= 2015 Davis Cup Americas Zone Group II =

International tennis competition

The Americas Zone is one of the three zones of regional Davis Cup competition in 2015.

In the Americas Zone there are three different groups in which teams compete against each other to advance to the next group.

== Participating nations ==
Seeds:

1. Venezuela
2. Chile
3. Mexico
4. El Salvador

Remaining nations:

- Bolivia
- Costa Rica
- Peru
- Puerto Rico

=== Draw ===
Play-offs
Bayamón, Puerto Rico (hard)
Costa Rica	0
Puerto Rico	5
Lima, Peru (clay)
Bolivia	2
Peru	3

First Round
Caracas, Venezuela (hard)
1	Venezuela	5
Costa Rica	0
Humacao, Puerto Rico (hard)
3	El Salvador	3
Puerto Rico	2
Mérida, Mexico (hard)
Bolivia	1
4	Mexico	3
Santiago, Chile (clay)
Peru	0
2	Chile	5

Second Round
Caracas, Venezuela (hard)
1	Venezuela	3
3	El Salvador	2
Talcahuano, Chile (indoor clay)
4	Mexico	0
2	Chile	5

Third Round
Santiago, Chile (clay)
1	Venezuela	0
2	Chile	5

- Costa Rica and Bolivia relegated to Group III in 2016.
- Chile promoted to Group I in 2016.

== First round ==
=== Venezuela vs. Costa Rica ===
Venezuela
5
Cancha Oscar E Payot, Caracas, Venezuela
6 – 8 March 2015
Hard

Costa Rica
0

			1	2	3	4	5
1	(Venezuela) (Costa Rica)	David Souto; Julián Saborío	6; 3	7^{7} 6^{4}	6; 3
2	(Venezuela) (Costa Rica)	Ricardo Rodríguez; Ignaci Roca	7; 5	3; 6	6; 1	6; 2
3	(Venezuela) (Costa Rica)	Luis David Martínez / Roberto Maytín; Pablo Núñez / Álvaro Daniel Riveros	6; 2	6; 1	6; 2
4	(Venezuela) (Costa Rica)	Ricardo Rodríguez; Pablo Núñez	6; 2	6; 0
5	(Venezuela) (Costa Rica)	Luis David Martínez; Ignaci Roca	6; 3	6; 1

=== Puerto Rico vs. El Salvador ===
Puerto Rico
2
Palmas del Mar Tennis Club, Humacao, Puerto Rico
6 – 8 March 2015
Hard

El Salvador
3

			1	2	3	4	5
1	(Puerto Rico) (El Salvador)	Gabriel Flores Ruiz; Marcelo Arévalo	2; 6	1; 6	0; 6
2	(Puerto Rico) (El Salvador)	Alex Llompart; Rafa Orantes	6; 2	6; 0	6; 2
3	(Puerto Rico) (El Salvador)	Alex Llompart / Gabriel Montilla; Marcelo Arévalo / Rafael Arévalo	2; 6	1; 6	2; 6
4	(Puerto Rico) (El Salvador)	Alex Llompart; Marcelo Arévalo	3; 6	2; 6	1; 6
5	(Puerto Rico) (El Salvador)	Christian Garay; Alberto Emmanuel Alvarado Larin	6; 2	6; 3

=== Mexico vs. Bolivia ===
Mexico
3
Cancha Estadio Lorenzo Molina Casares, Mérida, Mexico
6 – 8 March 2015
Hard

Bolivia
1

			1	2	3	4	5
1	(Mexico) (Bolivia)	Daniel Garza; Federico Zeballos	6; 2	6; 2	6; 0
2	(Mexico) (Bolivia)	Tigre Hank; Hugo Dellien	6^{2} 7^{7}	6; 2	4; 6	1; 6
3	(Mexico) (Bolivia)	Daniel Garza / Santiago González; Rodrigo Banzer / Federico Zeballos	4; 6	6; 3	6; 4	6; 2
4	(Mexico) (Bolivia)	Daniel Garza; Hugo Dellien	6; 3	6; 2	3; 6	6; 3
5	(Mexico) (Bolivia)	Tigre Hank; Federico Zeballos						not played

=== Chile vs. Peru ===
Chile
5
Club Palestino, Santiago, Chile
6 – 8 March 2015
Clay

Peru
0

			1	2	3	4	5
1	(Chile) (Peru)	Christian Garín; Duilio Beretta	4; 6	6^{3} 7^{7}	6; 1	7^{7} 6^{2}	10; 8
2	(Chile) (Peru)	Nicolás Jarry; Juan Pablo Varillas	6; 2	6; 2	3; 6	7^{7} 6^{3}
3	(Chile) (Peru)	Gonzalo Lama / Hans Podlipnik-Castillo; Juan Pablo Varillas / Sergio Galdós	6; 4	3; 6	6; 4	7; 5
4	(Chile) (Peru)	Nicolás Jarry; Duilio Vallebuona	7; 5	6; 2
5	(Chile) (Peru)	Hans Podlipnik-Castillo; Juan Pablo Varillas	6; 2	6; 2

== Second round ==
=== Venezuela vs. El Salvador ===
Venezuela
3
Cancha Oscar E Payot, Caracas, Venezuela
17 – 19 July 2015
Hard

El Salvador
2

			1	2	3	4	5
1	(Venezuela) (El Salvador)	David Souto; Marcelo Arévalo	2; 6	2; 6	3; 6
2	(Venezuela) (El Salvador)	Ricardo Rodríguez; Rafael Arévalo	6; 3	6; 2	6; 0
3	(Venezuela) (El Salvador)	Luis David Martínez / David Souto; Marcelo Arévalo / Rafael Arévalo	7; 5	6; 4	6; 4
4	(Venezuela) (El Salvador)	Ricardo Rodríguez; Marcelo Arévalo	2; 6	7^{7} 6^{3}	4; 6	3; 6
5	(Venezuela) (El Salvador)	David Souto; Rafael Arévalo	6; 0	6; 1				retired

=== Chile vs. Mexico ===
Chile
5
Coliseo La Tortuga, Talcahuano, Chile
17 – 19 July 2015
Clay (i)

Mexico
0

			1	2	3	4	5
1	(Chile) (Mexico)	Juan Carlos Sáez; Lucas Gómez	4; 6	6; 0	5; 7	7^{7} 6^{0}	6; 1
2	(Chile) (Mexico)	Christian Garin; Tigre Hank	6; 4	6; 4	6; 2
3	(Chile) (Mexico)	Nicolás Jarry / Hans Podlipnik; Daniel Garza / Gerardo López	6; 1	6; 4	6; 4
4	(Chile) (Mexico)	Juan Carlos Sáez; Tigre Hank	6; 4	6; 2
5	(Chile) (Mexico)	Christian Garin; Gerardo López	6; 2	6; 1

== Play-offs ==
=== Puerto Rico vs. Costa Rica ===
Puerto Rico
5
Centro de Tenis Honda, Bayamón, Puerto Rico
17 – 19 July 2015
Hard

Costa Rica
0

			1	2	3	4	5
1	(Puerto Rico) (Costa Rica)	Alex Llompart; Ignaci Roca	6; 1	7^{7} 6^{1}	6; 2
2	(Puerto Rico) (Costa Rica)	Alex Díaz; Pablo Núñez	6; 4	6^{6} 7^{8}	6; 1	6; 4
3	(Puerto Rico) (Costa Rica)	Eric Díaz / Alex Llompart; Daniel Gutiérrez / Julian Saborio	7^{7} 6^{4}	6; 3	6; 1
4	(Puerto Rico) (Costa Rica)	Christian Garay; Julian Saborio	7; 5	6; 1
5	(Puerto Rico) (Costa Rica)	Alex Díaz; Ignaci Roca	6; 3	7; 5

=== Peru vs. Bolivia ===
Peru
3
Club Terrezas de Miraflores, Lima, Peru
17 – 19 July 2015
Clay

Bolivia
2

			1	2	3	4	5
1	(Peru) (Bolivia)	Duilio Beretta; Federico Zeballos	4; 6	6^{3} 7^{7}	6; 2	6; 3	4; 6
2	(Peru) (Bolivia)	Juan Pablo Varillas Patino-Samudio; Hugo Dellien	7; 5	4; 6	3; 6	6^{3} 7^{7}
3	(Peru) (Bolivia)	Duilio Beretta / Jorge Brian Panta; Hugo Dellien / Federico Zeballos	6^{5} 7^{7}	1; 6	6; 4	7; 5	6; 4
4	(Peru) (Bolivia)	Duilio Beretta; Hugo Dellien	6; 4	6; 2	6^{2} 7^{7}	0; 6	6; 1
5	(Peru) (Bolivia)	Mauricio Echazú; Rodrigo Banzer	7; 5	4; 6	6^{5} 7^{7}	6; 3	6; 0

== Third round ==
=== Chile vs. Venezuela ===
Chile
5
Club Palestino, Santiago, Chile
18 – 20 September 2015
Clay

Venezuela
0

			1	2	3	4	5
1	(Chile) (Venezuela)	Gonzalo Lama; Ricardo Rodríguez	6; 4	6; 1	7; 5
2	(Chile) (Venezuela)	Hans Podlipnik; Jordi Muñoz Abreu	6; 4	6; 3	6; 3
3	(Chile) (Venezuela)	Christian Garin / Hans Podlipnik; Ricardo Rodríguez / Luis David Martínez	7^{7} 6^{0}	6; 4	7^{7} 6^{2}
4	(Chile) (Venezuela)	Juan Carlos Sáez; Miguel Ángel Este	6; 3	6; 2
5	(Chile) (Venezuela)	Gonzalo Lama; Jordi Muñoz Abreu	6; 1	6; 3
