= Chile Davis Cup team =

National sports team

Chile
- Captain: Nicolas Massu
- Nations Ranking: 16 ▼2 (21 September 2026)
- Colors: Red, Blue & White
- First year: 1928
- Years played: 78
- Ties played (W–L): 172 (91–81)
- Years in World Group: 15 (9–18)
- Davis Cup titles: 0
- Runners-up: 1
- Best finish: 1976 Davis Cup
- Most total wins: Luis Ayala (37–14)
- Most singles wins: Luis Ayala (27–6)
- Most doubles wins: Hans Gildemeister (13–6)
- Best doubles team: Fernando González and Nicolás Massú (9–4)
- Most ties played: Patricio Cornejo (32)
- Most years played: Patricio Cornejo (16)

The Chile men's national tennis team represents Chile in Davis Cup tennis tournament and is governed by Federación de tenis de Chile. The team played in the World Group on 2019 and reached the final one time in 1976, losing the cup against Italy in Santiago. Chile is currently #17 in the ITF Davis Cup rankings. The team is currently captained by former Chilean tennis player Nicolás Massú.

== History ==
Chile began playing at the Davis Cup in 1928, but would not win a tie until 1933, away at Uruguay, winning their first home tie in 1969, against Argentina. That was their only second home tie in their history.

The team's most successful performance at the Davis Cup was in 1976, losing 1–4 to the Italian team in the final held in Santiago, Chile. Since then, Chile have reached the quarterfinals in three occasions: in 1982, losing 1-4 against Australia, in 2006, losing to the USA 2-3, and in 2010, losing to the Czechs 1-4.

In the 2000s, thanks to Olympic gold winners Nicolás Massú and Fernando González, the Chilean team got promoted to the World Group for the first time in 20 years, and played there for every following season, excepting 2008. During this time, Chile went to play 6 World Group playoffs, winning their 4 home ties, against Japan, Pakistan, Australia and Austria, and losing an away tie to Israel. In 2011, Chile lost 1-4 against both the United States and Italy at home, and got relegated to the Americas Zone Group I. Later in 2012, once again they lost 1-4 away at Italy, without Fernando González, retired, and Nicolás Massú, inactive, for the first time in 9 years. Chile went to lose at Ecuador and Dominican Republic in 2013 and got relegated to the Americas Zone Group II for the first time in 23 years. Chile lost at Barbados 2-3 and won at home against Paraguay 5-0 to remain in the Group II for the 2015 season.

== Results and fixtures ==
The following are lists of match results and scheduled matches for the current year.

Win Loss Fixture

=== 2025 ===
Qualifiers
First round

Belgium
3
Sporthal Alverberg, Hasselt, Belgium
1–2 February 2025
Hard (indoors)

Chile
1

			1	2	3
1	(Belgium) (Chile)	Zizou Bergs; Tomás Barrios Vera	6; 4	6; 3
2	(Belgium) (Chile)	Alexander Blockx; Cristian Garín	6^{6} 7^{8}	1; 6
3	(Belgium) (Chile)	Sander Gillé / Joran Vliegen; Tomás Barrios Vera / Nicolás Jarry	6; 3	3; 6	6; 3
4	(Belgium) (Chile)	Zizou Bergs; Cristian Garín	6; 3	4; 6	7; 5
5	(Belgium) (Chile)	Alexander Blockx; Tomás Barrios Vera				not played

World Group I

Chile
4
Parque Deportivo Estadio Nacional
Santiago, Chile
13–14 September 2025
Clay

Luxembourg
0

			1	2	3
1	(Chile) (Luxembourg)	Cristian Garín; Aaron Gil Garcia	6; 2	6^{1} 7^{7}	6; 2
2	(Chile) (Luxembourg)	Tomás Barrios Vera; Alex Knaff	6; 1	6; 2
3	(Chile) (Luxembourg)	Tomás Barrios Vera / Matías Soto; Raphaël Calzi / Alex Knaff	6; 2	4; 6	6; 3
4	(Chile) (Luxembourg)	Daniel Antonio Núñez; Louis Van Herck	7^{7} 6^{2}	4; 6	10; 4
5	(Chile) (Luxembourg)	Tomás Barrios Vera; Aaron Gil Garcia				not played

=== 2026 ===
Qualifiers
First round

Chile
4
Estadio Nacional, Santiago, Chile
6–7 February 2026
Clay

Serbia
0

			1	2	3
1	(Chile) (Serbia)	Tomás Barrios Vera; Dušan Lajović	7; 5	7^{9} 6^{7}
2	(Chile) (Serbia)	Alejandro Tabilo; Ognjen Milić	6^{3} 7^{7}	6; 2	6; 4
3	(Chile) (Serbia)	Tomás Barrios Vera / Nicolás Jarry; Ivan Sabanov / Matej Sabanov	6; 4	6; 4
4	(Chile) (Serbia)	Matías Soto; Branko Đurić	6^{2} 7^{7}	7^{7} 6^{4}	10; 7
5	(Chile) (Serbia)	Tomás Barrios Vera; Ognjen Milić				not played

Qualifiers
Second round

Chile
0
Estadio Nacional, Santiago, Chile
19–20 September
Clay

Spain
4

			1	2	3
1	(Chile) (Spain)	Alejandro Tabilo; Daniel Mérida	7; 5	3; 6	3; 6
2	(Chile) (Spain)	Cristian Garín; Rafael Jódar	0; 6	2; 6
3	(Chile) (Spain)	Tomás Barrios Vera / Alejandro Tabilo; Pedro Martínez / Jaume Munar	0; 6	3; 6
4	(Chile) (Spain)	Matías Soto; Martín Landaluce	2; 6	3; 6
5	(Chile) (Spain)	Cristian Garín; Daniel Mérida				not played

== Players ==
=== Current team ===
Rankings as of 2024 Davis Cup Finals

Team representing Chile in 2024 Davis Cup Finals
Name	Born	First	Last		Ties	Win/Loss			Ranks		Apparel brand	Racket provider
Name	Born	First	Year	Tie	Ties	Sin	Dou	Tot	Sin	Dou	Apparel brand	Racket provider
Alejandro Tabilo	June 2, 1997	2019	2024	Slovakia	13	5–6	4–6	9–12	22	151	(Italy) Lotto	(Japan) Yonex
Nicolás Jarry	October 11, 1995	2017	2024	Slovakia	21	15–11	7–4	22–15	28	340	(United States) Wilson	(United States) Wilson
Cristian Garín	May 30, 1996	2012	2024	Slovakia	22	15–16	1–1	16–17	115	–	Non branded	(Austria) HEAD
Tomás Barrios	December 10, 1997	2017	2024	Slovakia	14	1–2	4–9	5–11	162	266	(Italy) Lotto	(Japan) Yonex
Matías Soto	April 27, 1999	2023	2024	Slovakia	2	0–0	0–2	0–2	311	128	(South Korea) Fila	(Japan) Yonex

Other active players called:

- Diego Fernández Flores #913 singles, #604 doubles (1–0 singles, 0–0 doubles)

== Historical results ==
=== 2010s ===
Year	Competition	Date	Location	Opponent	Score	Result
2010	World Group, 1st Round	6–8 March	Coquimbo (CHI)	Israel	4–1	Win
2010	World Group, Quarterfinals	9–11 July	Coquimbo (CHI)	Czech Republic	1–4	Loss
2011	World Group, 1st Round	4–6 March	Santiago (CHI)	United States	1–4	Loss
2011	World Group Play-off	7–9 July	Santiago (CHI)	Italy	1–4	Loss
2012	Americas Zone Group I, 2nd Round	6–8 April	Montevideo (URU)	Uruguay	3–1	Win
2012	World Group Play-off	14–16 September	Naples (ITA)	Italy	1–4	Loss
2013	Americas Zone Group I, 2nd Round	5–7 April	Manta (ECU)	Ecuador	2–3	Loss
2013	Americas Zone Group I, 2nd Round play-off	13–15 September	Santo Domingo Este (DOM)	Dominican Republic	1–4	Loss
2014	Americas Zone Group II, 1st Round	31 January–2 February	Bridgetown (BAR)	Barbados	2–3	Loss
2014	Americas Zone Group II Play-off	4–6 April	Santiago (CHI)	Paraguay	5–0	Win
2015	Americas Zone Group II, 1st Round	6–8 March	Santiago (CHI)	Peru	5–0	Win
2015	Americas Zone Group II, 2nd Round	17–19 July	Talcahuano (CHI)	Mexico	5–0	Win
2015	Americas Zone Group II, 3rd Round	18–20 September	Santiago (CHI)	Venezuela	5–0	Win
2016	Americas Zone Group I, 1st Round	4–6 March	Santiago (CHI)	Dominican Republic	5–0	Win
2016	Americas Zone Group I, 2nd Round	15–17 July	Iquique (CHI)	Colombia	3–1	Win
2016	World Group Play-off	16–18 September	Halifax (CAN)	Canada	0–5	Loss
2017	Americas Zone Group I, 1st Round	3–5 February	Santo Domingo Este (DOM)	Dominican Republic	5–0	Win
2017	Americas Zone Group I, 2nd Round	7–9 April	Medellín (COL)	Colombia	1–3	Loss
2018	Americas Zone Group I, 1st Round	2–3 February	Santiago (CHI)	Ecuador	3–1	Win
2018	Americas Zone Group I, 2nd Round	6–7 April	San Juan (ARG)	Argentina	2–3	Loss
2019	Qualifying round	1–2 February	Salzburg (AUT)	Austria	3–2	Win
2019	Finals, Group C	19 November	Madrid (ESP)	Argentina	0–3	Loss
2019	Finals, Group C	21 November	Madrid (ESP)	Germany	1–2	Loss

=== 2020s ===
Year	Competition	Date	Location	Opponent	Score	Result
2020–21	Qualifying round	6–7 March 2020	Stockholm (SWE)	Sweden	1–3	Loss
2020–21	World Group I	17–18 September 2021	Bratislava (SVK)	Slovakia	1–3	Loss
2022	World Group I play-offs	4–5 March 2022	Viña del Mar (CHI)	Slovenia	4–0	Win
2022	World Group I	17–18 September 2022	Lima (PER)	Peru	3–2	Win
2023	Qualifying round	4–5 February 2023	La Serena (CHI)	Kazakhstan	3–1	Win
2023	Finals, Group A	12 September 2023	Bologna (ITA)	Sweden	3–0	Win
2023	Finals, Group A	15 September 2023	Bologna (ITA)	Italy	0–3	Loss
2023	Finals, Group A	16 September 2023	Bologna (ITA)	Canada	1–2	Loss
2024	Qualifying round	3–4 February 2024	Santiago (CHI)	Peru	3–2	Win
2024	Finals, Group C	11 September 2024	Zhuhai (CHN)	United States	0–3	Loss
2024	Finals, Group C	12 September 2024	Zhuhai (CHN)	Germany	0–3	Loss
2024	Finals, Group C	15 September 2024	Zhuhai (CHN)	Slovakia	2–1	Win
2025	Qualifiers first round	1–2 February 2025	Hasselt (BEL)	Belgium	1–3	Loss
2025	World Group I	13–14 September 2025	Santiago (CHI)	Luxembourg	4–0	Win
2026	Qualifiers first round	6–7 February 2026	Santiago (CHI)	Serbia	4–0	Win
2026	Qualifiers second round	19–20 September 2026	Santiago (CHI)	Spain	0–4	Loss

== See also ==
- Chile Billie Jean King Cup team
- Chile Tennis Federation
