= 1976 Davis Cup =

1976 edition of the Davis Cup

Details
- Duration: 22 August 1975 – 19 December 1976
- Edition: 65th
- Teams: 53

Champion
- Winning nation: Italy

The 1976 Davis Cup was the 65th edition of the Davis Cup, the most important tournament between national teams in men's tennis. 58 teams would enter the competition, 32 in the Europe Zone, 14 in the Americas Zone, and 12 in the Eastern Zone. This year's tournament saw all teams in the Americas Zone competing in one single bracket, with the previous North & Central America and South America sub-zones, and subsequently the Americas Inter-Zonal final, being eliminated. This brought the Americas Zone in line with the outline of the other zones, with the previous year's Americas sub-zone champions progressing to the new Americas main draw semifinals.

Chile defeated South Africa in the Americas Zone final, Australia defeated New Zealand in the Eastern Zone final, and the Soviet Union and Italy were the winners of the two Europe Zones, defeating Hungary and Great Britain, respectively.

In the Inter-Zonal Zone, Italy defeated Australia in their semifinal; the second semifinal was scratched and Chile advanced to the Final as the Soviet Union refused to travel to Chile due to their opposition to the military dictatorship of Augusto Pinochet. In the final, held in the Estadio Nacional in Santiago, Chile, on 17–19 December, Italy defeated Chile to win their first title and become the seventh nation to win the Davis Cup.

== Americas Zone ==
=== Preliminary rounds ===
First Round
United States
bye
Venezuela
bye
Mexico City, Mexico (clay)
Mexico	5
Caribbean/West Indies	0
Montreal, Canada (indoor carpet)
Canada	5
Colombia	0
Brazil	w/o
Bolivia
Lima, Peru
Peru	3
Uruguay	2
bye
Ecuador
bye
Argentina

Qualifying Round
Tucson, AZ, United States (hard)
United States	5
Venezuela	0
Mexico City, Mexico (clay)
Mexico	3
Canada	2
Brasília, Brazil (clay)
Brazil	5
Peru	0
Guayaquil, Ecuador (clay)
Ecuador	0
Argentina	5

=== Main Draw ===
Quarterfinals; 19–28 December 1975
South Africa
bye
Mexico City, Mexico (clay)
United States	2
Mexico	3
Buenos Aires, Argentina (clay)
Brazil	0
Argentina	5
bye
Chile

Semifinals; 5–7 March
South Africa	w/o
Mexico
Santiago, Chile (clay)
Argentina	2
Chile	3

Final; 26–28 April
Santiago, Chile
South Africa	2
Chile	3

==== Final ====
Chile vs. South Africa

Chile
3
Santiago, Chile
26–28 April 1976

South Africa
2

			1	2	3	4	5
1	(Chile) (South Africa)	Patricio Cornejo; Bernard Mitton	4; 6	6; 3	5; 7	5; 7
2	(Chile) (South Africa)	Jaime Fillol; Raymond Moore	7; 5	8; 6	6; 3
3	(Chile) (South Africa)	Patricio Cornejo / Jaime Fillol; Byron Bertram / Frew McMillan	6; 3	10; 8	2; 6	4; 6	3; 6
4	(Chile) (South Africa)	Patricio Cornejo; Raymond Moore	5; 7	6; 2	10; 8	7; 5
5	(Chile) (South Africa)	Jaime Fillol; Bernard Mitton	7; 5	6; 3	4; 6	6; 2

== Eastern Zone ==
=== Preliminary rounds ===
First Round
Indonesia
bye
South Korea
bye
Sri Lanka
bye
Kuala Lumpur, Malaysia
Malaysia	0
Pakistan	5
Amritsar, India
India	5
Thailand	0
bye
Japan
bye
Philippines
bye
Chinese Taipei

Qualifying Round
Jakarta, Indonesia
Indonesia	3
South Korea	2
Colombo, Sri Lanka (clay)
Sri Lanka	0
Pakistan	4
Tokyo, Japan
India	3
Japan	2
Taipei, Taiwan (hard)
Philippines	4
Chinese Taipei	0

=== Main Draw ===
Quarterfinals; 28 November–21 December 1975
Australia
bye
Karachi, Pakistan
Indonesia	4
Pakistan	1
Manila, Philippines
India	4
Philippines	0
bye
New Zealand

Semifinals; 9–18 January
Hobart, Australia (grass)
Australia	5
Indonesia	0
Auckland, New Zealand (grass)
India	2
New Zealand	3

Final; 27 February–1 March
Brisbane, Australia (grass)
Australia	3
New Zealand	1

==== Final ====
Australia vs. New Zealand

Australia
3
Milton Courts, Brisbane, Australia
27 February–1 March 1976
Grass

New Zealand
1

			1	2	3	4	5
1	(Australia) (New Zealand)	Ross Case; Brian Fairlie	6; 3	8; 10	1; 6	6; 2	4; 6
2	(Australia) (New Zealand)	John Newcombe; Onny Parun	8; 6	6; 3	7; 5
3	(Australia) (New Zealand)	John Newcombe / Tony Roche; Brian Fairlie / Onny Parun	6; 1	3; 6	6; 3	7; 5
4	(Australia) (New Zealand)	John Newcombe; Brian Fairlie	8; 6	5; 7	11; 9	6; 3
5	(Australia) (New Zealand)	Ross Case; Onny Parun						not played

== Europe Zone ==
=== Zone A ===
==== Pre-qualifying round ====
Pre-qualifying round
Turkey
Israel	w/o

==== Preliminary rounds ====
First Round
Copenhagen, Denmark (indoor carpet)
Finland	1
Denmark	4
bye
West Germany
Monte Carlo, Monaco
Monaco	4
Israel	1
bye
Soviet Union
Brussels, Belgium
Belgium	4
Netherlands	1
bye
Hungary
Ireland	w/o
Rhodesia
bye
Egypt

Qualifying Round
Freiburg, West Germany (clay)
Denmark	0
West Germany	5
Tbilisi, Soviet Union
Monaco	0
Soviet Union	5
Brussels, Belgium
Belgium	0
Hungary	5
Cairo, Egypt
Ireland	1
Egypt	4

==== Main Draw ====
Quarterfinals; 14–16 May
Spain
bye
Bad Homburg, West Germany
West Germany	1
Soviet Union	4
Budapest, Hungary
Hungary	5
Egypt	0
bye
Czechoslovakia

Semifinals; 23–25 July
Donetsk, Soviet Union
Spain	1
Soviet Union	4
Budapest, Hungary (clay)
Hungary	3
Czechoslovakia	1

Final; 13–15 August
Tbilisi, Soviet Union
Soviet Union	4
Hungary	1

==== Final ====
Soviet Union vs. Hungary

Soviet Union
4
Tbilisi, Soviet Union
13–15 August 1976

Hungary
1

			1	2	3	4	5
1	(Soviet Union) (Hungary)	Alex Metreveli; János Benyik	6; 3	7; 5	6; 3
2	(Soviet Union) (Hungary)	Teimuraz Kakulia; Balázs Taróczy	3; 6	3; 6	4; 6
3	(Soviet Union) (Hungary)	Teimuraz Kakulia / Alex Metreveli; Péter Szőke / Balázs Taróczy	12; 10	6; 0	6; 4
4	(Soviet Union) (Hungary)	Alex Metreveli; Balázs Taróczy	7; 5	6; 1	9; 7
5	(Soviet Union) (Hungary)	Teimuraz Kakulia; János Benyik	6; 4	6; 8	3; 6	6; 3	6; 1

=== Zone B ===
==== Pre-qualifying rounds ====
First Round
Iran
bye
Nigeria	w/o
Algeria
bye
Luxembourg
bye
Portugal

Qualifying Round
Iran	w/o
Nigeria
Mondorf-les-Bains, Luxembourg (clay)
Luxembourg	0
Portugal	5

==== Preliminary rounds ====
First Round
Tehran, Iran
Iran	2
Switzerland	3
bye
Great Britain
Sofia, Bulgaria
Bulgaria	1
Austria	4
bye
Romania
Italy
bye
Warsaw, Poland (clay)
Poland	5
Norway	0
bye
Yugoslavia
Athens, Greece (clay)
Greece	4
Portugal	1

Qualifying Round
Zürich, Switzerland (clay)
Switzerland	1
Great Britain	4
Vienna, Austria
Austria	1
Romania	4
Florence, Italy (clay)
Italy	5
Poland	0
Zagreb, Yugoslavia
Yugoslavia	5
Greece	0

==== Main Draw ====
Quarterfinals; 20–23 May
France
bye
Eastbourne, United Kingdom (grass)
Great Britain	5
Romania	0
Bologna, Italy (clay)
Italy	5
Yugoslavia	0
bye
Sweden

Semifinals; 8–18 July
Eastbourne, United Kingdom (grass)
France	1
Great Britain	4
Rome, Italy (clay)
Italy	4
Sweden	0

Final; 5–7 August
Wimbledon, United Kingdom (grass)
Great Britain	1
Italy	4

==== Final ====
Great Britain vs. Italy

Great Britain
1
No. 1 Court, All England Club, Wimbledon, United Kingdom
5–7 August 1976
Grass

Italy
4

			1	2	3	4	5
1	(United Kingdom) (Italy)	Roger Taylor; Tonino Zugarelli	1; 6	5; 7	6; 3	1; 6
2	(United Kingdom) (Italy)	John Lloyd; Adriano Panatta	7; 5	3; 6	3; 6	6; 2	4; 6
3	(United Kingdom) (Italy)	David Lloyd / John Lloyd; Paolo Bertolucci / Adriano Panatta	6; 8	3; 6	6; 3	18; 16	6; 2
4	(United Kingdom) (Italy)	Roger Taylor; Adriano Panatta	6; 3	2; 6	4; 6	4; 6
5	(United Kingdom) (Italy)	John Lloyd; Tonino Zugarelli	6; 4	8; 6	1; 6	1; 6	1; 6

== Inter-Zonal Zone ==
=== Draw ===
Semifinals; 24–27 September
Rome, Italy (clay)
EUR-B	Italy	3
EAS	Australia	2
AME	Chile	w/o
EUR-A	Soviet Union

Final; 17–19 December
Santiago, Chile (clay)
EUR-B	Italy	4
AME	Chile	1

=== Semifinals ===
Italy vs. Australia

Italy
3
Foro Italico, Rome, Italy
24–27 September 1976
Clay

Australia
2

			1	2	3	4	5
1	(Italy) (Australia)	Corrado Barazzutti; John Newcombe	7; 5	6; 1	6; 4
2	(Italy) (Australia)	Adriano Panatta; John Alexander	5; 7	3; 6	4; 6
3	(Italy) (Australia)	Paolo Bertolucci / Adriano Panatta; John Newcombe / Tony Roche	6; 3	6; 4	6; 3
4	(Italy) (Australia)	Corrado Barazzutti; John Alexander	2; 6	2; 6	7; 5	6; 4	2; 6
5	(Italy) (Australia)	Adriano Panatta; John Newcombe	5; 7	8; 6	6; 4	6; 2

Chile vs. Soviet Union

The tie was scheduled to be completed by September 27, but the Soviet Union refused to travel to Chile due to their opposition to the military dictatorship of Augusto Pinochet: therefore, the tie was scratched and Chile advanced to the Final. The Soviet team were subsequently banned from entering the Davis Cup for two years.

=== Final ===
Chile vs. Italy

Chile
1
Estadio Nacional, Santiago, Chile
17–19 December 1976
Clay

Italy
4

			1	2	3	4	5
1	(Chile) (Italy)	Jaime Fillol; Corrado Barazzutti	5; 7	6; 4	5; 7	1; 6
2	(Chile) (Italy)	Patricio Cornejo; Adriano Panatta	3; 6	1; 6	3; 6
3	(Chile) (Italy)	Patricio Cornejo / Jaime Fillol; Paolo Bertolucci / Adriano Panatta	6; 3	2; 6	7; 9	3; 6
4	(Chile) (Italy)	Jaime Fillol; Adriano Panatta	6; 8	4; 6	6; 3	8; 10
5	(Chile) (Italy)	Belus Prajoux; Tonino Zugarelli	6; 4	6; 3	6; 2
