= 2018 Milex Open – Singles =

Singles
- 2018 Milex Open

Final
- Champion: (Chile) Christian Garín
- Runner-up: (Argentina) Federico Delbonis
- Score: 6–4, 5–7, 6–4

Events
Singles	Doubles
← 2017 ·	Milex Open	· 2019 →

Víctor Estrella Burgos was the defending champion but lost in the first round to Federico Delbonis.

Christian Garín won the title after defeating Delbonis 6–4, 5–7, 6–4 in the final.

== Seeds ==
1. (Uruguay) Pablo Cuevas (first round)
2. (Argentina) Federico Delbonis (final)
3. (Argentina) Guido Andreozzi (second round)
4. (Bolivia) Hugo Dellien (first round)
5. (Italy) Paolo Lorenzi (quarterfinals)
6. (Brazil) Thiago Monteiro (first round)
7. (Argentina) Juan Ignacio Londero (second round)
8. (Argentina) Facundo Bagnis (first round)

== Draw ==
=== Key ===
- Q = Qualifier
- WC = Wild card
- LL = Lucky loser
- Alt = Alternate
- ITF = ITF entry
- PR = Protected ranking
- SR = Special ranking
- SE = Special exempt
- JE = Junior exempt
- JR = Junior Accelerator Programme entrant
- CO = College Accelerator Programme entrant
- NG = Next Gen Accelerator Program entrant
- w/o = Walkover
- r = Retired
- d = Defaulted

=== Finals ===
Semifinals
(Argentina) Carlos Berlocq	7	6^{4}	1
(Chile) Christian Garín	5	7^{7}	6
(Serbia) Peđa Krstin	0	3
2	(Argentina) Federico Delbonis	6	6

Final
(Chile) Christian Garín	6	5	6
2	(Argentina) Federico Delbonis	4	7	4

=== Top half ===
First round
1	(Uruguay) P Cuevas	6^{5}	6	3
PR	(Colombia) S Giraldo	7^{7}	2	6
(Argentina) C Berlocq	6	6
Q	(Colombia) A Gómez	4	3
WC	(Dominican Republic) J Olivares	2	0
Q	(Argentina) F Coria	6	6
WC	(Dominican Republic) J Hernández-Fernández	7	1	7
6	(Brazil) T Monteiro	5	6	5
3	(Argentina) G Andreozzi	6^{2}	6	6
Q	(Uruguay) M Cuevas	7^{7}	2	3
(Croatia) N Serdarušić	7^{7}	6
Alt	(Brazil) T Bellucci	6^{5}	4
(Austria) S Ofner	2	0
(Chile) C Garín	6	6
(Ecuador) R Quiroz	1	3
7	(Argentina) JI Londero	6	6

Second round
PR	(Colombia) S Giraldo	6^{4}	6^{2}
(Argentina) C Berlocq	7^{7}	7^{7}
Q	(Argentina) F Coria	5	0
WC	(Dominican Republic) J Hernández-Fernández	7	6
3	(Argentina) G Andreozzi	6^{2}	4
(Croatia) N Serdarušić	7^{7}	6
(Chile) C Garín	6	6
7	(Argentina) JI Londero	3	1

Quarterfinals
(Argentina) C Berlocq	6	4	6
WC	(Dominican Republic) J Hernández-Fernández	1	6	2
(Croatia) N Serdarušić	2	2
(Chile) C Garín	6	6

Semifinals
(Argentina) C Berlocq	7	6^{4}	1
(Chile) C Garín	5	7^{7}	6

=== Bottom half ===
First round
8	(Argentina) F Bagnis	4	2
WC	(Ecuador) E Gómez	6	6
(Serbia) P Krstin	6	6
(Dominican Republic) R Cid Subervi	0	1
(El Salvador) M Arévalo	3	6^{7}
(Portugal) G Elias	6	7^{9}
PR	(Austria) J Melzer	7	6
4	(Bolivia) H Dellien	5	3
5	(Italy) P Lorenzi	3	6	6
Q	(Peru) JP Varillas	6	1	0
(Austria) G Melzer	6	2
Alt	(Argentina) P Cachin	2	0^{r}
(Spain) M Vilella Martínez	1	3
(Brazil) R Dutra Silva	6	6
WC	(Dominican Republic) V Estrella Burgos	5	3
2	(Argentina) F Delbonis	7	6

Second round
WC	(Ecuador) E Gómez	3	1
(Serbia) P Krstin	6	6
(Portugal) G Elias	7^{7}	6^{3}	6^{1}
PR	(Austria) J Melzer	6^{0}	7^{7}	7^{7}
5	(Italy) P Lorenzi	7^{9}	7^{7}
(Austria) G Melzer	6^{7}	6^{3}
(Brazil) R Dutra Silva	4	1
2	(Argentina) F Delbonis	6	6

Quarterfinals
(Serbia) P Krstin	6	3
PR	(Austria) J Melzer	1	2^{r}
5	(Italy) P Lorenzi	5	5
2	(Argentina) F Delbonis	7	7

Semifinals
(Serbia) P Krstin	0	3
2	(Argentina) F Delbonis	6	6
