= 2014 Davis Cup Americas Zone Group II =

International tennis competition

The Americas Zone is one of the three zones of regional Davis Cup competition in 2014.

In the Americas Zone there are three different groups in which teams compete against each other to advance to the next group.

== Participating nations ==
Seeds:

1. Chile
2. Mexico
3. Peru
4. El Salvador

Remaining nations:

- Barbados
- Bolivia
- Guatemala
- Paraguay

=== Draw ===
Play-offs
Santiago, Chile (clay)
1	Chile	5
Paraguay	0
Cochabamba, Bolivia (clay)
Bolivia	3
Guatemala	1

First round
Bridgetown, Barbados (hard)
1	Chile	2
Barbados	3
Asunción, Paraguay (clay)
4	El Salvador	3
Paraguay	2
Trinidad, Bolivia (clay)
Bolivia	2
3	Peru	3
Guatemala City, Guatemala (hard)
Guatemala	2
2	Mexico	3

Second round
Bridgetown, Barbados (hard)
Barbados	4
4	El Salvador	1
Puebla, Mexico (hard)
3	Peru	2
2	Mexico	3

Third round
Bridgetown, Barbados (hard)
Barbados	3
Mexico	2

- Paraguay and Guatemala relegated to Group III in 2015.
- Barbados promoted to Group I in 2015.

== First round ==
=== Barbados vs. Chile ===
Barbados
3
National Tennis Centre, Bridgetown, Barbados
31 January – 2 February 2014
Hard

Chile
2

			1	2	3	4	5
1	(Barbados) (Chile)	Haydn Lewis; Gonzalo Lama	4; 6	1; 6	6^{4} 7^{7}
2	(Barbados) (Chile)	Darian King; Cristian Garín	2; 6	7^{7} 6^{2}	7; 5	6; 3
3	(Barbados) (Chile)	Darian King / Haydn Lewis; Jorge Aguilar / Cristian Garín	6; 4	3; 6	7^{7} 6^{4}	6; 3
4	(Barbados) (Chile)	Darian King; Gonzalo Lama	6; 2	6; 4	6; 3
5	(Barbados) (Chile)	Russell Moseley; Jorge Aguilar	1; 6	2; 6

=== Paraguay vs. El Salvador ===
Paraguay
2
Club Internacional de Tenis – Estadio Víctor Pecci, Asunción, Paraguay
31 January – 2 February 2014
Clay

El Salvador
3

			1	2	3	4	5
1	(Paraguay) (El Salvador)	Juan Borba; Marcelo Arévalo	2; 6	2; 6	4; 6
2	(Paraguay) (El Salvador)	Diego Galeano; Rafael Arévalo	6^{2} 7^{7}	6; 1	6^{3} 7^{7}	6; 3	3; 6
3	(Paraguay) (El Salvador)	Diego Galeano / Juan Carlos Ramírez; Marcelo Arévalo / Rafael Arévalo	3; 6	4; 6	4; 6
4	(Paraguay) (El Salvador)	Juan Carlos Ramírez; Sebastián Quirós	6; 0	6; 0
5	(Paraguay) (El Salvador)	Juan Borba; Salvador Andrés Bolaños	6; 2	6; 0

=== Bolivia vs. Peru ===
Bolivia
2
Club De Tenis Trinidad, Trinidad, Bolivia
31 January – 2 February 2014
Clay

Peru
3

			1	2	3	4	5
1	(Bolivia) (Peru)	Federico Zeballos; Mauricio Echazú	6; 4	2; 6	2; 6	7^{7} 6^{3}	2; 6
2	(Bolivia) (Peru)	Hugo Dellien; Sergio Galdós	6; 3	6; 4	2; 6	6; 4
3	(Bolivia) (Peru)	Hugo Dellien / Federico Zeballos; Duilio Beretta / Sergio Galdós	7^{7} 6^{4}	7; 5	6; 4
4	(Bolivia) (Peru)	Hugo Dellien; Mauricio Echazú	6^{4} 7^{7}	2; 6	3; 6
5	(Bolivia) (Peru)	Federico Zeballos; Sergio Galdós	6; 1	3; 6	1; 6	6; 4	1; 6

=== Guatemala vs. Mexico ===
Guatemala
2
Federación Nacional De Tenis De Campo, Guatemala City, Guatemala
31 January – 2 February 2014
Hard

Mexico
3

			1	2	3	4	5
1	(Guatemala) (Mexico)	Luciano Ramazzini; Miguel Ángel Reyes-Varela	1; 6	1; 6	3; 6
2	(Guatemala) (Mexico)	Christopher Díaz Figueroa; Tigre Hank	6; 4	6; 4	6; 4
3	(Guatemala) (Mexico)	Stefan Emilio González / Sebastien Vidal; Miguel Gallardo Valles / Santiago González	4; 6	6^{4} 7^{7}	6^{5} 7^{7}
4	(Guatemala) (Mexico)	Christopher Díaz Figueroa; Miguel Ángel Reyes-Varela	7; 5	7^{11} 6^{9}	6; 1
5	(Guatemala) (Mexico)	Luciano Ramazzini; Miguel Gallardo Valles	1; 6	0; 6	1; 6

== Second round ==
=== Barbados vs. El Salvador ===
Barbados
4
National Tennis Centre, Bridgetown, Barbados
4–6 April 2014
Hard

El Salvador
1

			1	2	3	4	5
1	(Barbados) (El Salvador)	Darian King; Rafael Arévalo	6; 1	6; 3	6; 3
2	(Barbados) (El Salvador)	Haydn Lewis; Marcelo Arévalo	6^{3} 7^{7}	7; 5	4; 6	6^{1} 7^{7}
3	(Barbados) (El Salvador)	Darian King / Haydn Lewis; Marcelo Arévalo / Rafael Arévalo	2; 6	6; 4	7^{11} 6^{9}			retired
4	(Barbados) (El Salvador)	Darian King; Marcelo Arévalo	6; 0	1; 0				retired
5	(Barbados) (El Salvador)	Seanon Williams; Salvador Andres Bolanos	6; 2	6^{5} 7^{7}	7^{10} 6^{8}

=== Mexico vs. Peru ===
Mexico
3
Club Britania Zavaleta, Puebla, Mexico
4–6 April 2014
Hard

Peru
2

			1	2	3	4	5
1	(Mexico) (Peru)	Miguel Ángel Reyes-Varela; Mauricio Echazú	6; 3	4; 6	7^{7} 6^{2}	6; 4
2	(Mexico) (Peru)	César Ramírez; Duilio Beretta	6; 2	4; 6	6; 2	1; 6	1; 6
3	(Mexico) (Peru)	Santiago González / Miguel Ángel Reyes-Varela; Sergio Galdós / Rodrigo Sánchez	6; 2	6; 1	6; 1
4	(Mexico) (Peru)	Miguel Ángel Reyes-Varela; Duilio Beretta	6; 3	7^{7} 6^{2}	4; 6	6; 3
5	(Mexico) (Peru)	Miguel Gallardo Valles; Mauricio Echazú	3; 6	4; 6

== Play-offs ==
=== Chile vs. Paraguay ===
Chile
5
Club Palestino, Santiago, Chile
4–6 April 2014
Clay

Paraguay
0

			1	2	3	4	5
1	(Chile) (Paraguay)	Gonzalo Lama; Juan Borba	6; 3	6; 0	6; 1
2	(Chile) (Paraguay)	Cristian Garín; Gustavo Ramírez	4; 6	6; 3	6; 0	6; 3
3	(Chile) (Paraguay)	Jorge Aguilar / Paul Capdeville; Ramón Delgado / Gustavo Ramírez	6; 2	6; 4	6; 4
4	(Chile) (Paraguay)	Jorge Aguilar; Juan Carlos Ramírez	6; 4	6; 2
5	(Chile) (Paraguay)	Cristian Garín; Juan Borba	6; 2	6; 1

=== Bolivia vs. Guatemala ===
Bolivia
3
Country Club Cochabamba, Cochabamba, Bolivia
4–6 April 2014
Clay

Guatemala
1

			1	2	3	4	5
1	(Bolivia) (Guatemala)	Federico Zeballos; Christopher Díaz Figueroa	6^{8} 7^{10}	6^{4} 7^{7}	6^{4} 7^{7}
2	(Bolivia) (Guatemala)	Hugo Dellien; Andres Bucaro	6; 2	6; 3	7; 5
3	(Bolivia) (Guatemala)	Hugo Dellien / Federico Zeballos; Andres Bucaro / Christopher Díaz Figueroa	7^{7} 6^{3}	7; 5	6; 4
4	(Bolivia) (Guatemala)	Hugo Dellien; Christopher Díaz Figueroa	6; 3	3; 6	6; 2	4; 6	6; 2
5	(Bolivia) (Guatemala)	Federico Zeballos; Andres Bucaro						not played

== Third round ==
=== Barbados vs. Mexico ===
Barbados
3
National Tennis Centre, Bridgetown, Barbados
12–14 September 2014
Hard

Mexico
2

			1	2	3	4	5
1	(Barbados) (Mexico)	Haydn Lewis; Tigre Hank	5; 7	4; 6	3; 6
2	(Barbados) (Mexico)	Darian King; Miguel Ángel Reyes-Varela	6; 4	6; 4	6; 2
3	(Barbados) (Mexico)	Darian King / Haydn Lewis; Santiago González / Tigre Hank	4; 6	4; 6	6; 3	6; 4	4; 6
4	(Barbados) (Mexico)	Darian King; Tigre Hank	6; 2	6; 2	7; 5
5	(Barbados) (Mexico)	Haydn Lewis; Lucas Gómez	2; 6	6; 3	6; 1	6; 3
