= 2018 Milex Open – Doubles =

Doubles
- 2018 Milex Open

Final
- Champions: (India) Leander Paes; (Mexico) Miguel Ángel Reyes-Varela
- Runners-up: (Uruguay) Ariel Behar; (Ecuador) Roberto Quiroz
- Score: 4–6, 6–3, [10–5]

Events
Singles	Doubles
- Milex Open

Juan Ignacio Londero and Luis David Martínez were the defending champions but only Londero chose to defend his title, partnering Tomás Lipovšek Puches. Londero lost in the semifinals to Leander Paes and Miguel Ángel Reyes-Varela.

Paes and Reyes-Varela won the title after defeating Ariel Behar and Roberto Quiroz 4–6, 6–3, [10–5] in the final.

== Seeds ==
1. (Uruguay) Pablo Cuevas / (Spain) David Marrero (quarterfinals)
2. (India) Leander Paes / (Mexico) Miguel Ángel Reyes-Varela (champions)
3. (El Salvador) Marcelo Arévalo / (India) Jeevan Nedunchezhiyan (quarterfinals)
4. (Ecuador) Gonzalo Escobar / (Brazil) Fernando Romboli (quarterfinals)

== Draw ==
Key

- Q = Qualifier
- WC = Wild card
- LL = Lucky loser
- Alt = Alternate
- ITF = ITF entry
- PR = Protected ranking
- SR = Special ranking
- SE = Special exempt
- JE = Junior exempt
- JR = Junior Accelerator Programme entrant
- CO = College Accelerator Programme entrant
- NG = Next Gen Accelerator Program entrant
- w/o = Walkover
- r = Retired
- d = Defaulted

First round

Quarterfinals

Semifinals

Final

1
- (Uruguay) P Cuevas
- (Spain) D Marrero
6
6

- (Argentina) G Andreozzi
- (Argentina) G Durán
3
3

1
- (Uruguay) P Cuevas
- (Spain) D Marrero
3
7
[7]

WC
- (Dominican Republic) R Cid Subervi
- (Dominican Republic) J Hernández-Fernández
0
3

WC
- (Bolivia) H Dellien
- (Dominican Republic) V Estrella Burgos
6
5
[10]

WC
- (Bolivia) H Dellien
- (Dominican Republic) V Estrella Burgos
6
6

WC
- (Bolivia) H Dellien
- (Dominican Republic) V Estrella Burgos
3
6
[3]

3
- (El Salvador) M Arévalo
- (India) J Nedunchezhiyan
6
7^{7}

- (Uruguay) A Behar
- (Ecuador) R Quiroz
6
3
[10]

WC
- (Dominican Republic) J Olivares
- (Colombia) C Rodríguez
3
6^{2}

3
- (El Salvador) M Arévalo
- (India) J Nedunchezhiyan
7
4
[7]

- (Brazil) R Dutra Silva
- (Italy) P Lorenzi
2
6
[5]

- (Uruguay) A Behar
- (Ecuador) R Quiroz
5
6
[10]

- (Uruguay) A Behar
- (Ecuador) R Quiroz
6
4
[10]

- (Uruguay) A Behar
- (Ecuador) R Quiroz
6
3
[5]

- (Argentina) T Lipovšek Puches
- (Argentina) JI Londero
w/o

2
- (India) L Paes
- (Mexico) MÁ Reyes-Varela
4
6
[10]

- (Argentina) F Bagnis
- (Argentina) C Berlocq

- (Argentina) T Lipovšek Puches
- (Argentina) JI Londero
6^{5}
7^{8}
[11]

- (Peru) S Galdós
- (Brazil) T Monteiro
6^{4}
6^{2}

4
- (Ecuador) G Escobar
- (Brazil) F Romboli
7^{7}
6^{6}
[9]

4
- (Ecuador) G Escobar
- (Brazil) F Romboli
7^{7}
7^{7}

- (Argentina) T Lipovšek Puches
- (Argentina) JI Londero
4
6^{3}

- (Austria) G Melzer
- (Austria) J Melzer
6
6

2
- (India) L Paes
- (Mexico) MÁ Reyes-Varela
6
7^{7}

- (Germany) A Begemann
- (Slovakia) F Polášek
3
3

- (Austria) G Melzer
- (Austria) J Melzer
5
6^{7}

- (Portugal) G Elias
- (Serbia) P Krstin
3
0

2
- (India) L Paes
- (Mexico) MÁ Reyes-Varela
7
7^{9}

2
- (India) L Paes
- (Mexico) MÁ Reyes-Varela
6
6
