= 2018 Milex Open =

- Date: 8–13 October
- Edition: 4th
- Draw: 32S / 16D
- Surface: Green clay
- Location: Santo Domingo, Dominican Republic

Champions

Singles
- (Chile) Christian Garín

Doubles
- (India) Leander Paes / (Mexico) Miguel Ángel Reyes-Varela
← 2017 ·	Milex Open	· 2019 →

The 2018 Milex Open was a professional tennis tournament played on green clay courts. It was the fourth edition of the tournament which was part of the 2018 ATP Challenger Tour. It took place in Santo Domingo, Dominican Republic between 8 and 13 October 2018.

== Singles main-draw entrants ==
=== Seeds ===
Country	Player	Rank^{1}	Seed
URU	Pablo Cuevas	66	1
ARG	Federico Delbonis	91	2
ARG	Guido Andreozzi	99	3
BOL	Hugo Dellien	105	4
ITA	Paolo Lorenzi	113	5
BRA	Thiago Monteiro	115	6
ARG	Juan Ignacio Londero	118	7
ARG	Facundo Bagnis	139	8

- ^{1} Rankings were as of 1 October 2018.

=== Other entrants ===
The following players received wildcards into the singles main draw:

- (Dominican Republic) Víctor Estrella Burgos
- (Ecuador) Emilio Gómez
- (Dominican Republic) José Hernández-Fernández
- (Dominican Republic) José Olivares

The following players received entry into the singles main draw using protected rankings:

- (Colombia) Santiago Giraldo
- (Austria) Jürgen Melzer

The following players received entry into the singles main draw as alternates:

- (Brazil) Thomaz Bellucci
- (Argentina) Pedro Cachin

The following players received entry from the qualifying draw:

- (Argentina) Federico Coria
- (Uruguay) Martín Cuevas
- (Colombia) Alejandro Gómez
- (Peru) Juan Pablo Varillas

== Champions ==
=== Singles ===
- (Chile) Christian Garín def. (Argentina) Federico Delbonis 6–4, 5–7, 6–4.

=== Doubles ===
- (India) Leander Paes / (Mexico) Miguel Ángel Reyes-Varela def. (Uruguay) Ariel Behar / (Ecuador) Roberto Quiroz 4–6, 6–3, [10–5].
