= Cristian Garín =

Chilean tennis player (born 1996)

- Garín at the 2018 Wimbledon Championships
- ITF name: Cristian Garin
- Country (sports): Chile
- Residence: Santiago, Chile
- Born: 30 May 1996 (age 30) Arica, Chile
- Height: 1.85 m (6 ft 1 in)
- Turned pro: 2011
- Plays: Right-handed (two-handed backhand)
- Coach: Andrés Schneiter (2018–2020, 2022–2023); Franco Davín (2020–2021); Mariano Puerta (2021–2022); Pepe Vendrell (2022); Gonzalo Lama (2024–), Martin Rodriguez
- Prize money: US $7,023,730

Singles
- Career record: 138–135
- Career titles: 5
- Highest ranking: No. 17 (13 September 2021)
- Current ranking: No. 135 (31 August 2026)

Grand Slam singles results
- Australian Open: 3R (2022)
- French Open: 4R (2021)
- Wimbledon: QF (2022)
- US Open: 2R (2019, 2020, 2021, 2022)

Doubles
- Career record: 12–35
- Career titles: 0
- Highest ranking: No. 206 (10 May 2021)

Grand Slam doubles results
- Australian Open: 1R (2026)
- French Open: 1R (2019, 2020)
- Wimbledon: 1R (2019)
- US Open: 1R (2019)
- Last updated on: 31 August 2026.

Cristian Ignacio Garín Medone (Note: Born Christian Ignacio Garín Medone.) (Spanish pronunciation: [ˈkɾistjaŋ ɡaˈɾin]; (Note: In isolation, Cristian is pronounced [ˈkɾistjan].) born 30 May 1996) is a Chilean professional tennis player. He has a career-high ATP singles ranking of world No. 17 achieved on 13 September 2021 and a best doubles ranking of No. 206 reached on 10 May 2021. He is currently the No. 2 singles player from Chile. Garin has 5 ATP titles.

Garín became the youngest Chilean player to win an ATP Tour match, by defeating Dušan Lajović at 16 years and 8 months old in the first round of the 2013 VTR Open. He was the winner of the 2013 Junior French Open, beating Alexander Zverev in the final.

Garín has won five ATP tour titles, all on clay courts. In early 2019, he achieved his first consistent results in the ATP Tour, reaching three finals in five tournaments: he finished runner-up in the 2019 Brasil Open, won his first ATP title at the 2019 U.S. Men's Clay Court Championships, and won his second title at the 2019 BMW Open. Garín obtained his third title at the 2020 Córdoba Open. By winning his first ATP Tour 500 title at the 2020 Rio Open, Garín became the sixth-ever Chilean man to be ranked in the top 20.

== Junior career ==
In 2010, Garín won the U14 world championship with Bastián Malla and Sebastián Santibáñez, defeating Italy in the final. The next year, at 14 years old, Garín won his first ITF Junior title at the Pascuas Bowl, a Grade 5 tournament. In 2012 when Garín was 16 years old, he broke top ten in the ITF Junior Rankings after winning the Eddie Herr (G1) in singles and doubles and the Orange Bowl Doubles, partnering with Nicolás Jarry.

At the 2013 French Open, Garín reached his first Junior Grand Slam finals in both singles and doubles. He dropped only one set on his way to the singles final, meeting Alexander Zverev of Germany who he defeated in straight sets to win his first Junior Grand Slam title. In the doubles event, partnered by fellow Chilean Nicolás Jarry, they faced Kyle Edmund of Great Britain, and Portuguese Frederico Ferreira Silva, to whom they lost in two sets.

== Professional career ==
=== 2012: Pro and Davis Cup debuts ===
He entered in the ATP ranking in February, after defeating Felipe Mantilla in the F1 Chile. In March, he made his ATP Challenger debut, in the 2012 Cachantún Cup. He lost in three sets to Fernando Romboli. On 16 September, he became the youngest Chilean player to debut Davis Cup, before losing to Simone Bolelli. Garín recorded his best performance of the year in the F11 Chile in October, reaching the semifinals after defeating Juan Carlos Sáez, No. 435 in the ATP singles rankings.

=== 2013: First pro win ===
In February, he received a wildcard for the main draw of the 2013 VTR Open, ATP 250 tournament. In the first round, he defeated Dušan Lajović in two sets, gaining 20 points for the ranking. He lost in three sets to Jérémy Chardy in the second round, after winning the first set.

He also represented his country on the 2nd round of the 2013 Davis Cup Americas Zone Group I against Ecuador, playing two single matches.

=== 2014–2015: Top 300 ===
In his first year as a professional, he received a wildcard for 2014 Royal Guard Open, an ATP 250 tournament in his home country, Chile. He couldn't repeat previous year second round, losing in his first match against Jeremy Chardy in straight sets. The following week, he won a qualifier spot at main draw of 2014 Copa Claro, another ATP 250 event. After these stints in ATP Tour, he spent most of the year between Challengers and Futures, winning four of the latter. He ended the 2014 season as world No. 252.

In January 2015, he played for Chile in 2014 Davis Cup Americas Zone Group II, losing his singles match and doubles match. Chile lost against Barbados 3–2. Later, in march, he won two singles matches against the Paraguayan team. In 2015, Garín did not reach any main draws of professional tournaments, having as year best results semifinals of challenger tournaments. In January, he played for Chile in 2015 Davis Cup Americas Zone Group II, winning his singles match against Perú, series that Chile won 5–0. In July, he won two singles matches against Mexico, series that Chile also won 5–0. In September, Garín with Hans Podlipnik won the doubles match against Venezuela, series that Chile won 5–0 too, and achieved the promotion for Group I. Garín ended the 2015 season as world No. 321.

=== 2016: First Challenger title ===
Garín only played the 2016 Geneva Open in the professional tour, after winning in the qualifying draw. The rest of the season he took part of Challenger tournaments and Futures, winning four of the latter and achieving his first Challenger title in Lima, at the end of the season. Garín ended the year as world No. 211.

==== Davis Cup ====
In January, he played for Chile in 2016 Davis Cup Americas Zone Group I, and won a singles match against Dominican Republic when the series was already decided, Chile won the series 5–0. In September, he played in 2016 Davis Cup World Group play-offs, and lost two singles matches against Canada. Chile lost the series 5–0.

=== 2017: Grand Slam and top 200 debuts ===
Garín entered the top 200 in January, reaching world No. 187 the next month. Garín successfully made it through the qualifying draw of Wimbledon, at his first attempt. In the main draw, Garín lost in four sets against Jack Sock, 17th seed of the edition. Garín ended the year as world No. 311.

==== Davis Cup ====
In January, he played for Chile in 2017 Davis Cup Americas Zone Group I, and won a singles match against Dominican Republic, Chile won the series 5–0. In April, he won a singles match and lost another one against Colombia, Chile lost the series 3–1.

=== 2018: Three Challenger titles and top 100 ===
After not being able to defend the points of last year's good start, Garín fell to world No. 373 in mid-January. Cristian was able to revert his fall with good presentations in Challenger tournaments, reaching three semifinals (and one final) out of six presentations in three months. In May, he reached another final. In July, he was able to defend his participation in Wimbledon, making it through the qualifying draw again, and losing to Adrian Mannarino in four sets in the first round. In September, Garín reached his third final of the year.

As the Latin American swing of Challenger tournaments started in October, Garín won the Challenger of Campinas. The following week, he lifted the title at the Challenger of Santo Domingo. After a week of rest, Garín won another Challenger, Lima, for the second time of his career. With this last tournament, Garín entered the top 100, at world No. 89 on 29 October 2018. Garín ended his year with fifteen consecutive victories and three back-to-back titles at Challenger level. He finished the season ranked No. 85 in the singles rankings.

==== Davis Cup ====
In April, he played for Chile in 2018 Davis Cup Americas Zone Group I and lost two singles match against Argentina. Chile lost the series 3–2. However, 2018 was the seventh consecutive year for Garín representing his country at the Davis Cup, an impressive achievement considering he was only 21 years old at the time.

=== 2019: Two ATP titles, first Masters quarterfinals and top 40 ===
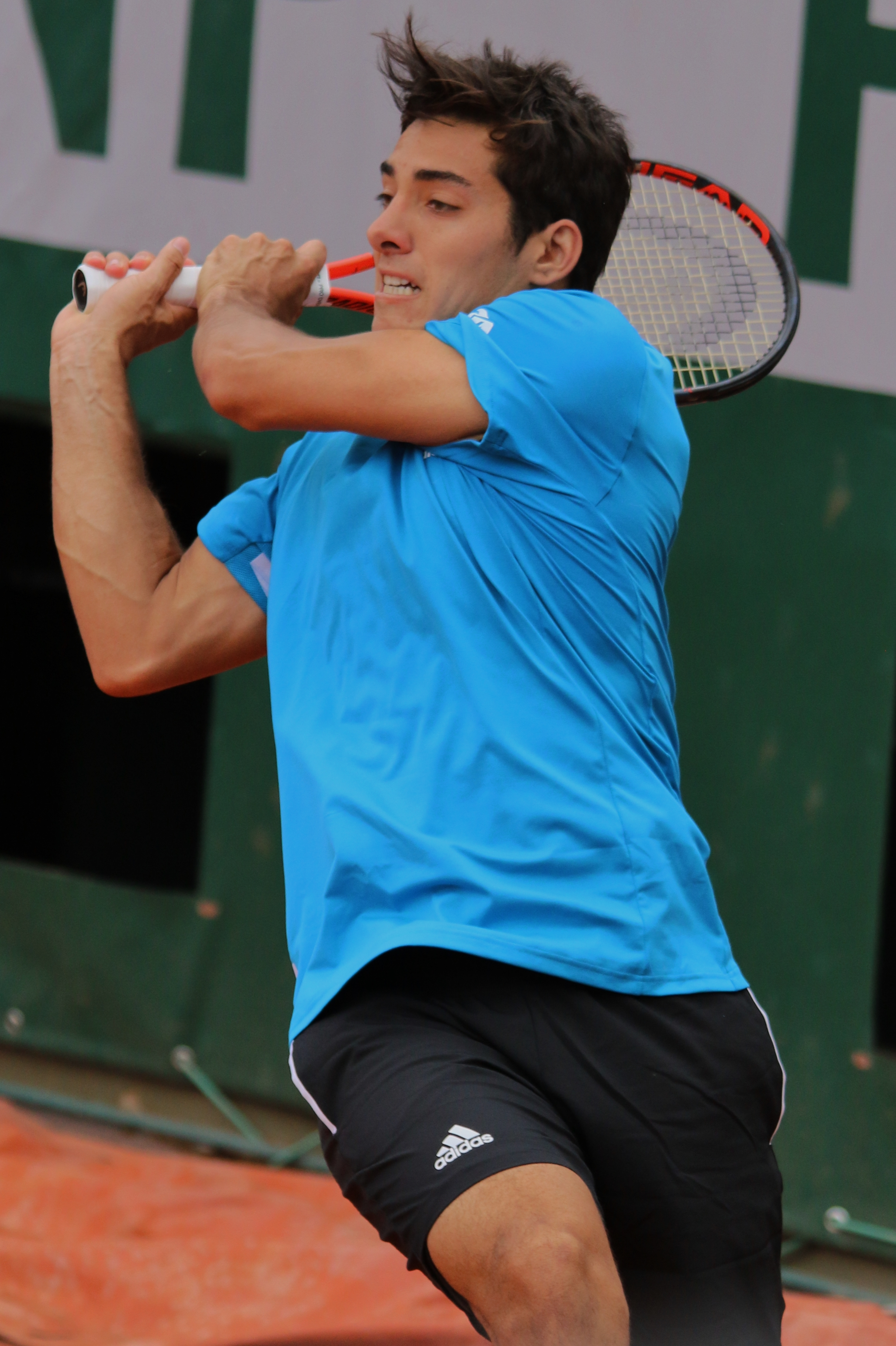
Garín at the 2019 French Open

Garín entered a Grand Slam main draw directly for the first time in 2019 Australian Open, but lost in straight sets to David Goffin. This was also his first participation in the first Grand Slam of the year. After Australia, Cristian took part in the rubber for 2019 Davis Cup for Chile against Austria. Garín lost to Dennis Novak, but won the decisive match against Jurij Rodionov, giving the Chilean team its first win in Europe over 50 years; this also put Chile on the 2019 Davis Cup Finals, where they could not make it past the group stage.

In the last week of February, Garín reached his first ATP final, at the 2019 Brasil Open, but lost the title to Guido Pella in straight sets. After losing in the qualifying round of the 2019 Miami Open, Garín started preparing for the upcoming clay-court season.

In the second week of April, he returned to the circuit with a great run at the 2019 U.S. Men's Clay Court Championships in Houston, Texas, where he ended up winning the tournament. On his way to the final, Garín defeated Pablo Cuevas, Jérémy Chardy, Henri Laaksonen and Sam Querrey, before facing the 20-year old Norwegian Casper Ruud in his second final of the season. Both players were aiming for their maiden ATP Tour title and the match went on to the third set, where Garín finally broke Ruud's serve and clinched a final win. This was the first title for a Chilean since 2009, when Fernando González won the title at the Chilean Open.

In late April Garín arrived to Europe, winning his first ATP match outside the Americas against Martin Kližan in Barcelona, where he went on to reach the third round after defeating Canadian rising star Denis Shapovalov. The following week, he went on to win his second title of the season in Munich, including stunning victories against clay-court specialists such as world No. 26 Diego Schwartzman, world No. 3 Alexander Zverev and world No. 19 Marco Cecchinato. In the final he defeated Budapest champion Matteo Berrettini in three sets, becoming the first Chilean to win an ATP tournament in Europe in more than a decade.

After losing in straight sets to Stan Wawrinka in the second round of the 2019 French Open, Garín won only two matches in the grass season, both at the 2019 Rosmalen Grass Court Championships where he made the quarterfinals. Highlights of Garín's second semester include reaching the round of 16 in the 2019 Rogers Cup (recording a first win against world No. 15 and former top-10 John Isner), reaching the quarter-finals in the 2019 Chengdu Open and his participation in the 2019 Rolex Paris Masters. In this last tournament, Garin recorded wins against Pablo Cuevas, world No. 17 John Isner and Jérémy Chardy. He lost in the quarterfinals against Grigor Dimitrov. However, it was the first time Garín reached such an advanced stage in a high category event (ATP Tour Masters 1000).

=== 2020: Two titles in one month and top 20 ===
Garín started his year representing Chile at the 2020 ATP Cup. As the No. 1 player of his country, he played against Gaël Monfils, Kevin Anderson and Novak Djokovic, losing all three matches as his team went home last place in their group. Cristian also won his first Australian Open match, defeating Stefano Travaglia before losing to Milos Raonic in the next round.

At the Golden Swing, Garín entered the Córdoba Open as the No. 3 seed. He won his third title after making comebacks in three of his four matches (despite losing in the first set), including the final against local favorite and world No. 14 Diego Schwartzman. After skipping the Argentina Open for medical reasons, he took part in the 2020 Rio Open. Garín entered as the No. 3 seed, behind world No. 22 Dušan Lajović and world No. 4 Dominic Thiem. After a difficult start to the tournament (with a very contested three set thriller against Andrej Martin), Garín went on to the final by winning against Federico Delbonis, Federico Coria and No. 5 seed Borna Ćorić. After winning the first set on a tiebreak, Garín came back from a 3–5 deficit in the second set of the final against Gianluca Mager to win the match; thus obtaining his first ATP 500 title. With the win, Garín appeared in the top 20 of the ATP Tour world ranking for the first time in his career (being only the sixth Chilean man in history to do so), as world No. 18 on 24 February 2020. Less than a week later, Garín would enter the 2020 Chile Open as a local and first seed. However, after receiving a bye in the first round and winning a very contested second-round match against Alejandro Davidovich Fokina, he was forced to retire (due to a back injury) after a set in his match against eventual champion Thiago Seyboth Wild. Even so, Garín would retain his world No. 18 ranking after the tournament.

Due to the suspension of the 2020 ATP Tour because of the COVID-19 pandemic, Garín (as the rest of professional tennis players) did not play in any professional tournaments until 7 June.

Garín returned to competitions on August at 2020 Western & Southern Open, which took part in New York; Garín lost in the first round to Aljaž Bedene. A week later, he reached second round of the 2020 US Open. After the American tournaments, Garín travelled to Europe for the clay-court tournaments. Despite a first round exit at the 2020 Italian Open (tennis), he bounced back with a semifinals appearance at the 2020 Hamburg European Open (getting wins over Kei Nishikori, Yannick Hanfmann and Alexander Bublik), losing in three tight sets to Stefanos Tsitsipas. He defeated Philipp Kohlschreiber and Marc Polmans before losing to Karen Khachanov at the third round of the 2020 French Open. After this, Garín participated in only one more professional tournament, the 2020 Erste Bank Open; getting a first round win over world No. 19 Stan Wawrinka before losing to Dominic Thiem.

=== 2021: Title on home soil, second Masters quarterfinal ===
Garín started his 2021 season at the Delray Beach Open. As the top seed, he lost in the first round to American qualifier Christian Harrison. He withdrew from the Australian Open due to suffering a fall in which he injured his left wrist. Also, he didn't travel to Melbourne due to the limitations in place at the tournament which wouldn't allow him to travel with his physio played a factor. This year's Australian Open is taking place amid strict COVID-19 rules which requires players to quarantine for 14 days upon arrival and limits the number of team members they can bring.

Garín returned to play in March competing at the Argentina Open. Seeded second, he was defeated in the second round by qualifier Sumit Nagal. As the top seed at the Chile Open, he won his fifth career ATP tour title by beating Facundo Bagnis in the final. Seeded 13th at the Miami Open, he fell in the second round to Marin Čilić.

Garín started his clay-court season at the Monte-Carlo Masters. He reached the third round where he lost to fourth seed, world No. 5, and eventual champion, Stefanos Tsitsipas. At the same tournament, in doubles, he partnered with Guido Pella to reach his first quarterfinal in doubles at a Masters 1000. They ended up losing to the fourth-seeded pair of Marcel Granollers/Horacio Zeballos. Seeded 13th at the Barcelona Open, he was eliminated in the second round by Kei Nishikori. Seeded second at the Estoril Open, he reached the quarterfinals where he lost to eventual finalist Cam Norrie. Seeded 16th at the Madrid Open, Garín upset second seed and world No. 3, Daniil Medvedev, in the third round to advance to his second Masters 1000 quarterfinals and his first on a clay court. He ended up losing to eighth seed, world No. 10, and eventual finalist, Matteo Berrettini. In Rome, he lost in the second round to 10th seed and world No. 11, Roberto Bautista Agut. Seeded 22nd at the French Open, Garín made his best Grand Slam run in his career by reaching the fourth round; he lost to world No. 2 Daniil Medvedev.

Seeded 17th at Wimbledon, Garín reached the fourth round for the first time in his career and second time in a row at a major in 2021. He ended up losing to world No. 1, five-time champion, and eventual champion, Novak Djokovic. He is the first Chilean to reach the fourth round of Wimbledon since Fernando González ran to the last eight in 2005.

After Wimbledon, Garín competed at the Swedish Open. Seeded second, he reached the quarterfinals where he lost to eventual finalist Federico Coria. Seeded fourth at the Swiss Open, he made it to the quarterfinals where he was defeated by eventual finalist, Hugo Gaston, despite having four match points in the third-set tiebreaker.

In August, Garín played at the National Bank Open in Toronto. Seeded 13th, he lost in the second round to eventual semifinalist John Isner. Seeded 16th at the Western & Southern Open in Cincinnati, he fell in the first round to American qualifier Tommy Paul. Despite this result, he reached the second round of the US Open. He reached a career-high ranking of World No. 17 on 13 September 2021.

=== 2022: Rome Masters and Wimbledon quarterfinals ===
Garín started his 2022 season by representing Chile at the ATP Cup. Chile was in Group A alongside Spain, Serbia, and Norway. He lost his first match to Roberto Bautista Agut of Spain. In his second match, he beat Dušan Lajović of Serbia via retirement. In his third match, he lost to Casper Ruud of Norway. In the end, Chile ended second in Group A. Seeded 16th at the Australian Open, he reached the third round where he was defeated by 17th seed and world No. 20 Gaël Monfils.

Seeded third at the Córdoba Open, Garín was eliminated in the second round by Sebastián Báez. Seeded fifth at the Rio Open, he was the defending champion from when the event was last held in 2020. He was beaten in the first round by Federico Coria. As the top seed and defending champion at the Chile Open, he fell in the second round to compatriot Alejandro Tabilo.

After his loss in Santiago, Garín admitted that he wasn't in a good place, and he hinted that he might decide to stop his career due to being plagued by a shoulder injury for quite some time and for his struggling form. He returned to action at the Miami Open. Seeded 27th, he was beaten in the second round by Pedro Martínez.

Garín started his clay-court season at the 2022 U.S. Men's Clay Court Championships in Houston. Seeded fifth, he was the defending champion from when the tournament was last held in 2019. He beat second seed, world No. 13, American Taylor Fritz, in the quarterfinals. He lost in three sets in his semifinal match to fourth seed and world No. 27 John Isner. Garín pulled out of the Monte-Carlo Masters for unknown reasons. Seeded fifth at the Serbia Open, he was defeated in the first round by Holger Rune. Seeded fifth at the BMW Open in Munich, he was eliminated in the first round by lucky loser Alejandro Tabilo. In Madrid, he was beaten in the second round by eighth seed and world No. 10, Félix Auger-Aliassime. At the Italian Open, Garín reached his third career Masters 1000 quarterfinals. He ended up losing to second seed, world No. 3, and 2017 champion, Alexander Zverev. Ranked No. 37 at the French Open, he defeated 30th seed and world No. 33 Tommy Paul and Ilya Ivashka in the second round. He lost in the third round to seventh seed Andrey Rublev, in a tight four-set match.

Garín started his grass-court season at the Halle Open. He lost in the first round to Sebastian Korda. In Eastbourne, he was defeated in the first round by sixth seed and defending champion, Alex de Minaur. Ranked No. 43 at Wimbledon, he defeated 29th seed Jenson Brooksby to reach the fourth round for the second consecutive year. He then stunned 19th seed and world No. 27 Alex de Minaur, in a tight five-set match to reach the first Grand Slam quarterfinal of his career. Garin was just the eighth Chilean male player to reach a Grand Slam quarterfinal, and the fourth to do so at Wimbledon after Luis Ayala, Ricardo Acuña and Fernando González. His run came to an end as he lost in the quarterfinals to eventual finalist Nick Kyrgios.

Seeded sixth at the Swiss Open, Garín suffered a first-round loss at the hands of qualifier Yannick Hanfmann. At the Generali Open Kitzbühel in Kitzbühel, Austria, he lost in the first round to Federico Coria.

Due to a wrist injury, Garín missed the National Bank Open and the Western & Southern Open. Ranked 82 at the US Open, he lost in four sets in the second round to 18th seed and world No. 20 Alex de Minaur.

In October, Garin played at Astana Open. He lost in the first round to fourth seed, world No. 7, and eventual champion Novak Djokovic. At the first edition of the Firenze Open, he was defeated in the first round by seventh seed Alexander Bublik. In Stockholm, he was beaten in the second round by seventh seed, world No. 27, and eventual champion Holger Rune. At the Vienna Open, he lost in the first round to sixth seed and world No. 12 Jannik Sinner. He finished the season ranked No. 85, his lowest ranking in 5 years.

=== 2023: 100th career and third top-5 wins, Masters fourth round ===
Garín started his 2023 season at the Open Nouvelle-Calédonie in Nouméa. As the top seed, he reached the semifinals where he lost to Raúl Brancaccio. At the Australian Open, he was defeated in the first round by 29th seed and eventual quarterfinalist Sebastian Korda.

After the Australian Open, Garín represented Chile in the Davis Cup tie against Kazakhstan. He lost his first match to Timofey Skatov. However, he won his second match over Alexander Bublik. In the end, Chile won the tie 3–1 over Kazakhstan to qualify for the Davis Cup Finals. At the Córdoba Open, he recorded his 101st ATP singles match win by defeating seventh seed Pedro Martinez, in the first round. He was eliminated from the tournament in the second round by João Sousa. In Rio, he lost in the first round to Pedro Martinez. At his home tournament in Chile, he defeated Dominic Thiem in straight sets in the first round. He lost in the second round to third seed and last year finalist, Sebastián Báez.

Getting past qualifying at the BNP Paribas Open, he defeated Daniel Elahi Galán in the first round. In the second round, he defeated 28th seed Yoshihito Nishioka. In the third round, he stunned third seed and world No. 4 Casper Ruud, for his third top-5 win to reach the fourth round for the first time at this tournament. He lost in the fourth round to 23rd seed and world No. 28 Alejandro Davidovich Fokina. Making it through the qualifying rounds at the Miami Open, he upset 27th seed Sebastián Báez, in the second round to reach back-to-back third rounds of a Masters 1000 and for the first time at this tournament. In the third round, he pushed second seed and world No. 3 Stefanos Tsitsipas, to three sets, but he ended up losing the match. As a result, he returned to the top 75 in the rankings on 3 April 2023.

Garín started his clay court season at the U.S. Men's Clay Court Championships in Houston. He reached the quarterfinals where he lost to eighth seed and eventual finalist, Tomás Martín Etcheverry. At the BMW Open in Munich, he beat sixth seed, Lorenzo Sonego, in the second round. He was defeated in the quarterfinals by top seed, world No. 7, defending champion, and eventual champion Holger Rune. In Madrid, he upset 27th seed Miomir Kecmanović, in the second round to reach another Masters 1000 third round. He lost his third-round match to eighth seed and world No. 10 Taylor Fritz. Previous year quarterfinalist at the Italian Open, he beat 16th seed and world No. 17 Tommy Paul, in the second round to reach his fourth consecutive Masters 1000 third round match. He retired during his third-round match against Laslo Djere because of back and abdominal issues. Due to him not defending his quarterfinal points from the previous year, his ranking fell from No. 79 down to No. 106. Shortly before the start of the French Open, on 25 May, Garín announced that he would be withdrawing due to a broken rib. Although he had reached the quarterfinals at the 2022 Wimbledon, Garín did not compete in the tournament as his ranking was too low for direct entry, and he did not participate in the qualifying draw.

Ranked No. 98, at the 2023 Rolex Shanghai Masters he reached the second round with a win over Aleksandar Kovacevic but lost to second seed Daniil Medvedev.

=== 2024–2026: Four ATP Challenger titles, back to top 100 ===
Garín started his 2024 season by competing at the Australian Open. He lost in the first round to Christopher O'Connell in five sets. Ranked No. 111, he qualified for the 2024 Wimbledon Championships having missed the previous edition due to injury.

Garín also qualified for the 2025 Wimbledon Championships as a lucky loser and recorded a first-round win against Grand Slam debutant Chris Rodesch. Garín won his fourth Challenger title of the season at the 2025 Uruguay Open in Montevideo and returned to the Top 100 climbing to World No. 80 in the rankings on 17 November 2025.

After a four-year absence, Garin qualified for the main draw of the 2026 Monte-Carlo Masters but lost to third seed Alexander Zverev in the second round, after leading 4–0 in the third set.

== Davis Cup controversy ==
In February 2025, during the Davis Cup tie between Belgium and Chile, Zizou Bergs struck Garín with his shoulder during an exuberant celebration. Bergs was not defaulted, but given a warning for unsportsmanlike conduct. As Garín refused to continue play, Ramos gave him three consecutive time violations, thus ending the match.

== Personal life ==
On 26 November 2022, Garín married Melanie Goldberg. The couple has since divorced.

== Performance timelines ==
Key
W	F	SF	QF	#R	RR	Q#	P#	DNQ	A	Z#	PO	G	S	B	NMS	NTI	P	NH

(W) winner; (F) finalist; (SF) semifinalist; (QF) quarterfinalist; (#R) rounds 4, 3, 2, 1; (RR) round-robin stage; (Q#) qualification round; (P#) preliminary round; (DNQ) did not qualify; (A) absent; (Z#) Davis/Fed Cup Zonal Group (with number indication) or (PO) play-off; (G) gold, (S) silver or (B) bronze Olympic/Paralympic medal; (NMS) not a Masters tournament; (NTI) not a Tier I tournament; (P) postponed; (NH) not held; (SR) strike rate (events won / competed); (W–L) win–loss record.
To avoid confusion and double counting, these charts are updated at the conclusion of a tournament or when the player's participation has ended.

=== Singles ===
Current through 2026 Mutua Madrid Open.

Tournament	2011	2012	2013	2014	2015	2016	2017	2018	2019	2020	2021	2022	2023	2024	2025	2026	SR	W–L	Win%
Grand Slam tournaments
Australian Open	A	A	A	A	A	A	A	A	1R	2R	A	3R	1R	1R	2R	1R	0 / 7	4–7	36%
French Open	A	A	A	A	Q1	A	Q1	Q1	2R	3R	4R	3R	A	Q1	Q2		0 / 4	8–4	67%
Wimbledon	A	A	A	A	A	A	1R	1R	1R	NH	4R	QF	A	1R	2R		0 / 7	8–7	53%
US Open	A	A	A	A	A	A	Q2	Q1	2R	2R	2R	2R	Q1	Q1	Q2		0 / 4	4–4	50%
Win–loss	0–0	0–0	0–0	0–0	0–0	0–0	0–1	0–1	2–4	4–3	7–3	9–4	0–1	0–2	2–2	0–1	0 / 22	24–22	52%
National representation
Davis Cup	A	PO	Z1	Z2	Z2	PO	Z1	Z1	RR	A	WG1	WG1	RR	RR	WG1		0 / 3	17–17	50%
ATP 1000 tournaments
Indian Wells Open	A	A	A	A	A	A	A	A	A	NH	3R	A	4R	A	Q2	A	0 / 2	4–2	67%
Miami Open	A	A	A	A	A	A	A	A	Q1	NH	2R	2R	3R	Q1	A	Q1	0 / 3	2–3	40%
Monte-Carlo Masters	A	A	A	A	A	A	A	A	A	NH	3R	A	A	A	A	2R	0 / 2	3–2	60%
Madrid Open	A	A	A	A	A	A	A	A	A	NH	QF	2R	3R	A	Q2	1R	0 / 4	6–4	60%
Italian Open	A	A	A	A	A	A	A	A	A	1R	2R	QF	3R	Q1	A		0 / 4	7–4	64%
Canadian Open	A	A	A	A	A	A	A	A	3R	NH	2R	A	1R	A	A		0 / 3	2–3	40%
Cincinnati Open	A	A	A	A	A	A	A	A	1R	1R	1R	A	A	A	Q1		0 / 3	0–3	–
Shanghai Masters	A	A	A	A	A	A	A	A	2R	NH			2R	A	A		0 / 2	2–2	50%
Paris Masters	A	A	A	A	A	A	A	A	QF	A	A	A	A	A	A		0 / 1	3–1	75%
Win–loss	0–0	0–0	0–0	0–0	0–0	0–0	0–0	0–0	6–4	0–2	7–7	4–3	10–6	0–0	0–0	1–2	0 / 24	28–24	54%
Career statistics
	2011	2012	2013	2014	2015	2016	2017	2018	2019	2020	2021	2022	2023	2024	2025	2026	Totals		
Tournaments	0	0	1	2	0	1	1	1	24	11	18	21	16	9	6	4	115		
Titles	0	0	0	0	0	0	0	0	2	2	1	0	0	0	0	0	5		
Finals	0	0	0	0	0	0	0	0	3	2	1	0	0	0	0	0	6		
Overall win–loss	0–0	0–1	2–4	2–3	3–0	1–3	2–2	0–3	32–24	18–12	21–18	18–23	21–18	9–10	6–7	2–5	5 / 116	137–133	51%
Win (%)	–	0%	33%	40%	100%	25%	50%	0%	57%	60%	54%	44%	54%	47%	46%	33%	51%		
Year-end ranking	n/a	923	388	252	321	211	311	84	33	22	17	85	82	152	80		$6,858,717		

=== Doubles ===
Tournament	2013	2014	2015	2016	2017	2018	2019	2020	2021	2022	2023	2024	W–L	Win%
Grand Slam tournaments
Australian Open	A	A	A	A	A	A	A	A	A	A	A	A	0–0	–
French Open	A	A	A	A	A	A	1R	1R	A	A	A	A	0–2	0%
Wimbledon	A	A	A	A	A	A	1R	NH	A	A	A	A	0–1	0%
US Open	A	A	A	A	A	A	1R	A	A	A	A	A	0–1	0%
Win–loss	0–0	0–0	0–0	0–0	0–0	0–0	0–3	0–1	0–0	0–0	0–0	0–0	0–4	0%
National representation
Davis Cup	A	Z2	Z2	A	A	A	A	A	A				1–1	50%
ATP 1000 tournaments
Indian Wells Open	A	A	A	A	A	A	A	NH	1R	A	A		0–1	0%
Miami Open	A	A	A	A	A	A	A	NH	A	A	A		0–0	–
Monte-Carlo Masters	A	A	A	A	A	A	A	NH	QF	A	A		2–1	67%
Madrid Open	A	A	A	A	A	A	A	NH	2R	A	A		1–0	100%
Italian Open	A	A	A	A	A	A	A	1R	1R	A	A		0–2	0%
Canadian Open	A	A	A	A	A	A	1R	NH	2R	A	A		1–2	33%
Cincinnati Open	A	A	A	A	A	A	2R	1R	1R	A	A		1–3	25%
Shanghai Masters	A	A	A	A	A	A	1R	NH		A	A		0–1	0%
Paris Masters	A	A	A	A	A	A	A	A	A	A	A		0–0	–
Win–loss	0–0	0–0	0–0	0–0	0–0	0–0	1–3	0–2	4–5	0–0	0–0	0–0	5–10	33%
Career statistics
	2013	2014	2015	2016	2017	2018	2019	2020	2021	2022	2023	2024	W–L	Win%
Tournaments	1	1	0	0	0	0	14	6	9	3	1	0	35	
Overall win–loss	0–1	1–2	1–0	0–0	0–0	0–0	3–13	2–6	5–8	0–3	0–1	0–0	12–34	26%
Win (%)	0%	33%	100%	–	–	–	19%	25%	38%	0%	0%	–	26%	
Year-end ranking		1214	540	360	576	429	521	501	345	286	235			

== ATP Tour finals ==
=== Singles: 6 (5 titles, 1 runner-up) ===
Legend Grand Slam (0–0) ATP 1000 (0–0) ATP 500 (1–0) ATP 250 (4–1)	Finals by surface Hard (0–0) Clay (5–1) Grass (0–0)	Finals by setting Outdoor (5–0) Indoor (0–1)

Result	W–L	Date	Tournament	Tier	Surface	Opponent	Score
Loss	0–1	Mar 2019	Brasil Open, Brazil	ATP 250	Clay (i)	(Argentina) Guido Pella	5–7, 3–6
Win	1–1	Apr 2019	U.S. Men's Clay Court Championships, US	ATP 250	Clay	(Norway) Casper Ruud	7–6^{(7–4)}, 4–6, 6–3
Win	2–1	May 2019	Bavarian Championships, Germany	ATP 250	Clay	(Italy) Matteo Berrettini	6–1, 3–6, 7–6^{(7–1)}
Win	3–1	Feb 2020	Córdoba Open, Argentina	ATP 250	Clay	(Argentina) Diego Schwartzman	2–6, 6–4, 6–0
Win	4–1	Feb 2020	Rio Open, Brazil	ATP 500	Clay	(Italy) Gianluca Mager	7–6^{(7–3)}, 7–5
Win	5–1	Mar 2021	Chile Open, Chile	ATP 250	Clay	(Argentina) Facundo Bagnis	6–4, 6–7^{(3–7)}, 7–5

== ATP Challenger Tour finals ==
=== Singles: 11 (8 titles, 3 runner-ups) ===
Finals by surface
Hard (0–1)
Clay (8–2)

Result	W–L	Date	Tournament	Tier	Surface	Opponent	Score
Win	1–0	Oct 2016	Lima Challenger, Peru	Challenger	Clay	(Argentina) Guido Andreozzi	3–6, 7–5, 7–6^{(7–3)}
Loss	1–1	Feb 2018	Morelos Open, Mexico	Challenger	Hard	(United States) Dennis Novikov	4–6, 3–6
Loss	1–2	May 2018	Lisboa Belém Open, Portugal	Challenger	Clay	(Spain) Tommy Robredo	6–3, 3–6, 2–6
Loss	1–3	Sep 2018	Città di Como Challenger, Italy	Challenger	Clay	(Italy) Salvatore Caruso	5–7, 4–6
Win	2–3	Oct 2018	São Paulo Challenger, Brazil	Challenger	Clay	(Argentina) Federico Delbonis	6–3, 6–4
Win	3–3	Oct 2018	Santo Domingo Milex Open, Dominican Republic	Challenger	Clay	(Argentina) Federico Delbonis	6–4, 5–7, 6–4
Win	4–3	Oct 2018	Lima Challenger, Peru (2)	Challenger	Clay	(Portugal) Pedro Sousa	6–4, 6–4
Win	5–3	May 2025	Open de Oeiras II, Portugal	Challenger	Clay	(United States) Mitchell Krueger	7–6^{(7–3)}, 4–6, 6–2
Win	6–3	Apr 2025	Danube Upper Austria Open, Austria	Challenger	Clay	(Chile) Tomás Barrios Vera	3–6, 6–1, 6–4
Win	7–3	Oct 2025	Antofagasta Challenger, Chile	Challenger	Clay	(Argentina) Facundo Díaz Acosta	2–6, 6–3, 6–3
Win	8–3	Nov 2025	Uruguay Open, Uruguay	Challenger	Clay	(Peru) Ignacio Buse	6–7^{(3–7)}, 6–2, 6–2

=== Doubles: 5 (1 title, 4 runner-ups) ===
Finals by surface
Hard (0–0)
Clay (1–4)

Result	W–L	Date	Tournament	Tier	Surface	Partner	Opponents	Score
Win	1–0	Apr 2014	Cachantún Cup, Chile	Challenger	Clay	(Chile) Nicolás Jarry	(Chile) Jorge Aguilar (Chile) Hans Podlipnik Castillo	walkover
Loss	1–1	Jun 2015	Aspria Tennis Cup, Italy	Challenger	Clay	(Chile) Juan Carlos Sáez	(Croatia) Nikola Mektić (Croatia) Antonio Šančić	3–6, 4–6
Loss	1–2	Sep 2015	Aberto Rio Grande do Sul, Brazil	Challenger	Clay	(Chile) Juan Carlos Sáez	(Portugal) Gastão Elias (Portugal) Frederico Ferreira Silva	2–6, 4–6
Loss	1–3	Aug 2016	Cortina Tennis International, Italy	Challenger	Clay	(Spain) Roberto Carballés Baena	(United States) James Cerretani (Austria) Philipp Oswald	3–6, 2–6
Loss	1–4	Nov 2016	Uruguay Open, Uruguay	Challenger	Clay	(Brazil) Fabiano de Paula	(Argentina) Andrés Molteni (Argentina) Diego Schwartzman	walkover

== ITF Tour finals ==
=== Singles: 10 (8 titles, 2 runner-ups) ===
Finals by surface
Hard (0–0)
Clay (8–2)

Result	W–L	Date	Tournament	Tier	Surface	Opponent	Score
Loss	0–1	May 2013	Chile F3, Santiago	Futures	Clay	(Australia) James Duckworth	1–6, 3–6
Win	1–1	May 2014	Brazil F4, Natal	Futures	Clay	(Brazil) Thales Turini	6–4, 4–6, 6–3
Loss	1–2	May 2014	US F14, Tampa	Futures	Clay	(United States) Bjorn Fratangelo	2–6, 3–6
Win	2–2	Jun 2014	Spain F12, Madrid	Futures	Clay	(Chile) Nicolás Jarry	3–6, 6–3, 6–1
Win	3–2	Nov 2014	Brazil F11, Porto Alegre	Futures	Clay	(Brazil) Caio Zampieri	6–2, 4–6, 6–4
Win	4–2	Dec 2014	Argentina F20, Mendoza	Futures	Clay	(Poland) Grzegorz Panfil	6–4, 5–7, 6–2
Win	5–2	Feb 2016	Spain F5, Cartagena	Futures	Clay	(Spain) Oriol Roca Batalla	6–4, 6–2
Win	6–2	May 2016	Tunisia F20, Hammamet	Futures	Clay	(Spain) Carlos Taberner	6–3, 7–6^{(7–1)}
Win	7–2	Jun 2016	Tunisia F21, Hammamet	Futures	Clay	(Serbia) Nikola Milojević	6–4, 2–6, 6–0
Win	8–2	Jul 2016	Italy F19, Naples	Futures	Clay	(Argentina) Juan Pablo Paz	6–2, 6–0

=== Doubles: 2 (1 title, 1 runner-up) ===
Result	W–L	Date	Tournament	Tier	Surface	Partner	Opponents	Score
Win	1–0	May 2013	ITF Chile, Santiago	Futures	Clay	(Chile) Nicolás Jarry Fillol	(Chile) Guillermo Rivera (Chile) Cristóbal Saavedra	6–2, 6–2
Loss	1–1	Dec 2014	Argentina F20, Mendoza	Futures	Clay	(Chile) Jorge Aguilar Mondaca	(Argentina) Mateo Nicolás Martínez (Argentina) Facundo Mena	6–7^{(4–7)}, 4–6

== Junior Grand Slam finals ==
=== Singles: 1 (title) ===
Result	Year	Tournament	Surface	Opponent	Score
Win	2013	French Open	Clay	(Germany) Alexander Zverev	6–4, 6–1

=== Doubles: 1 (runner-up) ===
Result	Year	Tournament	Surface	Partner	Opponents	Score
Loss	2013	French Open	Clay	(Chile) Nicolás Jarry	(United Kingdom) Kyle Edmund (Portugal) Frederico Ferreira Silva	3–6, 3–6

== Wins over top 10 players ==
- Garín has a 4–22 record against players who were, at the time the match was played, ranked in the top 10.

#	Player	Rk	Event	Surface	Rd	Score	CGR
2019
1.	(Germany) Alexander Zverev	3	Munich Open, Germany	Clay	QF	6–4, 5–7, 7–5	47
2021
2.	(Russia) Daniil Medvedev	3	Madrid Open, Spain	Clay	3R	6–4, 6–7^{(2–7)}, 6–1	25
2023
3.	(Norway) Casper Ruud	4	Indian Wells Masters, United States	Hard	3R	6–4, 7–6^{(7–2)}	97
2024
4.	(Germany) Alexander Zverev	5	Munich Open, Germany	Clay	QF	6–4, 6–4	106

== National representation ==
=== Davis Cup ===
==== Participations: 30 (15–15) ====
Group membership World Group (2–1) Qualifying Round (2–2) WG Play-off (0–3) Group I (4–7) Group II (6–2) Group III (0–0) Group IV (0–0)	Matches by surface Hard (4–8) Clay (10–6) Grass (0–0) Carpet (0–0)	Matches by type Singles (14–14) Doubles (1–1)

- ▲ ▼ indicates the outcome of the Davis Cup match followed by the score, date, place of event, the zonal classification and its phase, and the court surface.

Rubber outcome	No.	Rubber	Match type (partner if any)	Opponent nation	Opponent player(s)	Score
▼1–4; 14–16 September 2012; Tennis Club Napoli, Naples, Italy; Davis Cup World Group play-offs; clay (outdoor) surface
Defeat	1	V	Singles	Italy	Simone Bolelli	4–6, 3–6
▼2–3; 5–7 April 2013; Umiña Tenis Club, Manta, Ecuador; Davis Cup Group I semi-finals; hard (outdoor) surface
Defeat	2	I	Singles	Ecuador	Julio César Campozano	6–4, 2–6, 6–2, 2–6, 7–9
Defeat	3	V	Singles	Ecuador	Emilio Gómez	4–6, 6–4, 3–6, 6–7^{(1–7)}
▼1–4; 13–15 September 2013; Parque del Este, Santo Domingo, Dominican Republic; Davis Cup Group I play-offs; hard (outdoor) surface
Defeat	4	II	Singles	Dominican Republic	Víctor Estrella Burgos	5–7, 2–6, 4–6
Victory	5	V	Singles	Dominican Republic	Peter Bertran	7–5, 7–5
▼2–3; 31 January – 2 February 2014; National Tennis Centre, Bridgetown, Barbados; Davis Cup Group II quarter-finals; hard (outdoor) surface
Defeat	6	II	Singles	Barbados	Darian King	6–2, 6–7^{(2–7)}, 5–7, 3–6
Defeat	7	III	Doubles (with Jorge Aguilar)	Barbados	Darian King / Haydn Lewis	4–6, 6–3, 6–7^{(4–7)}, 3–6
▲5–0; 4–6 April 2014; Club Palestino, Santiago, Chile; Davis Cup Group II play-offs; clay (outdoor) surface
Victory	8	II	Singles	Paraguay	Gustavo Ramírez	4–6, 6–3, 6–0, 6–3
Victory	9	V	Singles	Paraguay	Juan Borba	6–2, 6–1
▲5–0; 6–8 March 2015; Club Palestino, Santiago, Chile; Davis Cup Group II quarter-finals; clay (outdoor) surface
Victory	10	I	Singles	(Peru) Perú	Duilio Beretta	4–6, 6–7^{(3–7)}, 6–1, 7–6^{(7–2)}, 10–8
▲5–0; 17–19 July 2015; Coliseo La Tortuga, Talcahuano, Chile; Davis Cup Group II semi-finals; clay (indoor) surface
Victory	11	II	Singles	(Mexico) México	Tigre Hank	6–4, 6–4, 6–2
Victory	12	V	Singles	(Mexico) México	Gerardo López Villaseñor	6–2, 6–1
▲5–0; 18–20 September 2015; Club Palestino, Santiago, Chile; Davis Cup Group II Finals; clay (outdoor) surface
Victory	13	III	Doubles (with Hans Podlipnik)	Venezuela	Ricardo Rodríguez / Luis David Martínez	7–6^{(7–0)}, 6–4, 7–6^{(7–2)}
▲5–0; 18–20 September 2016; Estadio Nacional, Santiago, Chile; Davis Cup Group I semi-finals; clay (outdoor) surface
Victory	14	IV	Singles	Dominican Republic	Manuel Castellanos	6–1, 6–2
▼0–5; 16–18 September 2016; Scotiabank Centre, Halifax, Canada; Davis Cup World Group play-offs; hard (indoor) surface
Defeat	15	I	Singles	Canada	Frank Dancevic	6–3, 6–7^{(5–7)}, 1–6, 4–6
Defeat	16	IV	Singles	Canada	Denis Shapovalov	6–7^{(5–7)}, 4–6
▲5–0; 3–5 February 2017; Parque del Este, Santo Domingo, Dominican Republic; Davis Cup Group I semi-finals; hard (outdoor) surface
Victory	17	II	Singles	Dominican Republic	Roberto Cid	5–7, 6–1, 6–2, 6–2
▼1–3; 7–9 April 2017; Country Club Ejecutivos, Medellín, Colombia; Davis Cup Group I Finals; clay (outdoor) surface
Victory	18	II	Singles	Colombia	Eduardo Struvay	6–3, 6–3, 6–2
Defeat	19	IV	Singles	Colombia	Santiago Giraldo	7–6^{(12–10)}, 3–6, 3–6, 7–6^{(9–7)}, 3–6
▼2–3; 6–7 April 2018; Estadio Aldo Cantoni, San Juan, Argentina; Davis Cup Group I Finals; clay (indoor) surface
Defeat	20	II	Singles	Argentina	Diego Schwartzman	6–7^{(2–7)}, 7–6^{(7–2)}, 2–6
Defeat	21	V	Singles	Argentina	Guido Pella	3–6, 6–7^{(3–7)}
▲3–2; 1–2 February 2019; Salzburgarena, Salzburg, Austria; Davis Cup Finals Qualifying Round; clay (indoor) surface
Defeat	22	II	Singles	Austria	Dennis Novak	4–6, 4–6
Victory	23	V	Singles	Austria	Jurij Rodionov	6–2, 6–1
▼0–3; 19 November 2019; Caja Mágica, Madrid, Spain; Davis Cup Finals; hard (indoor) surface
Defeat	24	II	Singles	Argentina	Diego Schwartzman	2–6, 2–6
▼1–2; 21 November 2019; Caja Mágica, Madrid, Spain; Davis Cup Finals; hard (indoor) surface
Victory	25	II	Singles	Germany	Jan-Lennard Struff	6–7^{(3–7)}, 7–6^{(9–7)}, 7–6^{(10–8)}
▼1–3; 17–18 September 2021; NTC Arena, Bratislava, Slovakia; Davis Cup World Group I; hard (indoor) surface
Victory	26	I	Singles	Slovakia	Alex Molčan	6–2, 6–4
Defeat	27	IV	Singles	Slovakia	Norbert Gombos	0–6, 1–6
▲3–1; 4–5 February 2023; Campus Trentino, La Serena, Chile; Davis Cup qualifying round; clay (outdoor) surface
Defeat	28	I	Singles	Kazakhstan	Timofey Skatov	1–6, 3–6
Victory	29	IV	Singles	Kazakhstan	Alexander Bublik	6–4, 3–6, 6–3
▲3–0; 12 September 2023; Unipol Arena, Bologna, Italy; Davis Cup Finals; hard (indoor) surface
Victory	30	I	Singles	Sweden	Leo Borg	7–6^{(8–6)}, 3–6, 7–5
