= 2017 Davis Cup Americas Zone Group I =

International tennis competition

The Americas Zone was one of the three zones of the regional Davis Cup competition in 2017.

In the Americas Zone there were three different tiers, called groups, in which teams competed against each other to advance to the upper tier. Winners in Group I advanced to the World Group play-offs, along with losing teams from the World Group first round. Teams who lost their respective ties competed in the relegation play-offs, with winning teams remaining in Group I, whereas teams who lost their play-offs were relegated to the Americas Zone Group II in 2018.

== Participating nations ==
Seeds: All seeds received a bye into the second round.

1. Brazil
2. Colombia

Remaining nations:

- Chile
- Dominican Republic
- Ecuador
- Peru

=== Draw ===
Second Round Play-offs
Santo Domingo, Dominican Republic (hard)
Peru	1
Dominican Republic	4

First Round Play-offs
bye
Peru
Dominican Republic
bye

First Round
1	Brazil
bye
Guayaquil, Ecuador (clay)
Peru	0
Ecuador	5
Santo Domingo Este, Dominican Republic (hard)
Dominican Republic	0
Chile	5
bye
2	Colombia

Second Round
Ambato, Ecuador (clay)
1	Brazil	5
Ecuador	0
Medellín, Colombia (clay)
Chile	1
2	Colombia	3

- Peru relegated to Group II in 2018.
- Brazil and Colombia advance to World Group Play-off.

== First round ==
=== Ecuador vs. Peru ===
Ecuador
5
Guayaquil Tennis Club, Guayaquil, Ecuador
3–5 February
Clay

Peru
0

			1	2	3	4	5
1	(Ecuador) (Peru)	Emilio Gómez; Juan Pablo Varillas	6; 3	6; 0	6^{5} 7^{7}	2; 6	6; 3
2	(Ecuador) (Peru)	Roberto Quiroz; Mauricio Echazú	5; 7	6; 4	6; 1	6; 3
3	(Ecuador) (Peru)	Emilio Gómez / Roberto Quiroz; Mauricio Echazú / Jorge Panta	6; 2	3; 6	7; 5	7^{7} 6^{5}
4	(Ecuador) (Peru)	Roberto Quiroz; Juan Pablo Varillas	6; 4	7^{8} 6^{6}
5	(Ecuador) (Peru)	Gonzalo Escobar; Alexander Merino	6; 3	6; 0

=== Dominican Republic vs. Chile ===
Dominican Republic
0
Centro De Tenis Parque Del Este, Santo Domingo Este, Dominican Republic
3–5 February
Hard

Chile
5

			1	2	3	4	5
1	(Dominican Republic) (Chile)	José Hernández; Nicolás Jarry	3; 6	5; 7	2; 6
2	(Dominican Republic) (Chile)	Roberto Cid Subervi; Christian Garín	7; 5	1; 6	2; 6	2; 6
3	(Dominican Republic) (Chile)	Roberto Cid Subervi / José Hernández; Nicolás Jarry / Hans Podlipnik-Castillo	2; 6	4; 6	3; 6
4	(Dominican Republic) (Chile)	José Olivares; Marcelo Tomás Barrios Vera	6^{8} 7^{10}	6^{2} 7^{7}
5	(Dominican Republic) (Chile)	Nick Hardt; Nicolás Jarry	3; 6	3; 6

== Second round ==
=== Ecuador vs. Brazil ===
Ecuador
0
Club Tungurahua, Ambato, Ecuador
7–9 April
Clay

Brazil
5

			1	2	3	4	5
1	(Ecuador) (Brazil)	Emilio Gómez; Thomaz Bellucci	2; 6	4; 6	7^{7} 6^{1}	6; 4	4; 6
2	(Ecuador) (Brazil)	Roberto Quiroz; Thiago Monteiro	7^{8} 6^{6}	6^{0} 7^{7}	3; 6	6^{7} 7^{9}
3	(Ecuador) (Brazil)	Gonzalo Escobar / Roberto Quiroz; Marcelo Melo / Bruno Soares	3; 6	4; 6	3; 6
4	(Ecuador) (Brazil)	Iván Endara; Thomaz Bellucci	6^{7} 7^{9}	4; 6
5	(Ecuador) (Brazil)	Gonzalo Escobar; Thiago Monteiro	7^{7} 6^{5}	4; 6	3; 6

=== Colombia vs. Chile ===
Colombia
3
Country Club Ejecutivos, Medellín, Colombia
7–9 April
Clay

Chile
1

			1	2	3	4	5
1	(Colombia) (Chile)	Santiago Giraldo; Nicolás Jarry	4; 6	6; 2	6; 2	7^{9} 6^{7}
2	(Colombia) (Chile)	Eduardo Struvay; Christian Garín	3; 6	3; 6	2; 6
3	(Colombia) (Chile)	Juan Sebastián Cabal / Robert Farah; Nicolás Jarry / Hans Podlipnik-Castillo	7^{7} 6^{3}	3; 6	6; 3	6; 1
4	(Colombia) (Chile)	Santiago Giraldo; Christian Garín	6^{10} 7^{12}	6; 3	6; 3	6^{7} 7^{9}	6; 3
5	(Colombia) (Chile)	Eduardo Struvay; Nicolás Jarry						not played

== 2nd round play-offs ==
=== Dominican Republic vs. Peru ===
Dominican Republic
4
Centro de Tenis Parque del Este, Santo Domingo, Dominican Republic
15–17 September 2017
Hard

Peru
1

			1	2	3	4	5
1	(Dominican Republic) (Peru)	Víctor Estrella Burgos; Nicolás Álvarez	6; 0	6; 3	6; 4
2	(Dominican Republic) (Peru)	José Hernández-Fernández; Mauricio Echazú	7^{7} 6^{3}	4; 6	6; 3	6; 3
3	(Dominican Republic) (Peru)	Roberto Cid Subervi / Víctor Estrella Burgos; Nicolás Álvarez / Sergio Galdós	3; 6	6; 4	6; 3	1; 6	6; 3
4	(Dominican Republic) (Peru)	José Olivares; Mauricio Echazú	4; 6	1; 2				retired
5	(Dominican Republic) (Peru)	José Hernández-Fernández; Nicolás Álvarez	6; 2	7^{7} 6^{3}
