= 2016 Davis Cup World Group play-offs =

Tennis competition

The 2016 Davis Cup World Group play-offs were held from 16 to 18 September. They were the main play-offs of the 2016 Davis Cup. The winners of the playoffs advanced to the 2017 Davis Cup World Group, and the losers were relegated to their respective Zonal Regions I.

== Teams ==
Bold indicates team had qualified for the 2017 Davis Cup World Group.

From World Group

- **Japan**
- Kazakhstan
- **Switzerland**
- Poland
- **Canada**
- **Germany**
- **Australia**
- **Belgium**

From Americas Group I

- Brazil
- Chile

From Asia/Oceania Group I

- India
- Uzbekistan

From Europe/Africa Group I

- **Spain**
- Ukraine
- **Russia**
- Slovakia

== Results summary ==
Date: 16–18 September

The eight losing teams in the World Group first round ties and eight winners of the Zonal Group I final round ties competed in the World Group play-offs for spots in the 2017 World Group. The draw took place on July 18 in London.

**Seeded teams**

1. Switzerland
2. Belgium
3. Australia
4. Canada
5. Kazakhstan
6. Spain
7. Germany
8. Japan

**Unseeded teams**

- Brazil
- Chile
- India
- Poland
- Russia
- Slovakia
- Ukraine
- Uzbekistan

Home team	Score	Visiting team	Location	Venue	Door	Surface
Uzbekistan	2–3	**Switzerland**	Tashkent	Olympic Tennis School	Outdoor	Clay
**Belgium**	4–0	Brazil	Ostend	Sleuyter Arena	Indoor	Hard
**Australia**	3–0	Slovakia	Sydney	NSW Tennis Centre	Outdoor	Grass
**Canada**	5–0	Chile	Halifax	Scotiabank Centre	Indoor	Hard
**Russia**	3–1	Kazakhstan	Moscow	National Tennis Center	Outdoor	Hard
India	0–5	**Spain**	New Delhi	R.K. Khanna Tennis Complex	Outdoor	Hard
**Germany**	3–2	Poland	Berlin	Rot-Weiss Tennis Club	Outdoor	Clay
**Japan**	5–0	Ukraine	Osaka	Utsubo Tennis Center	Outdoor	Hard

- Australia, Belgium, Canada, Germany, Japan and Switzerland will remain in the World Group in 2017.
- Spain and Russia are promoted to the World Group in 2017.
- Brazil, Chile, India, Slovakia, Ukraine and Uzbekistan will remain in Zonal Group I in 2017.
- Kazakhstan and Poland are relegated to Zonal Group I in 2017.

== Playoff results ==
=== Uzbekistan vs. Switzerland ===
Uzbekistan
2
Olympic Tennis School, Tashkent, Uzbekistan
16 – 18 September
Clay

Switzerland
3

			1	2	3	4	5
1	(Uzbekistan) (Switzerland)	**Denis Istomin**; Antoine Bellier	**6**; 3	**6**; 2	**6**; 4
2	(Uzbekistan) (Switzerland)	Sanjar Fayziev; **Henri Laaksonen**	2; **6**	2; **6**	2; **6**
3	(Uzbekistan) (Switzerland)	Farrukh Dustov / Denis Istomin; **Adrien Bossel / Henri Laaksonen**	4; **6**	2; **6**	6^{2} **7^{7}**
4	(Uzbekistan) (Switzerland)	**Denis Istomin**; Henri Laaksonen	6^{3} **7^{7}**	**7^{8}** 6^{6}	**7^{8}** 6^{6}	**7**; 5
5	(Uzbekistan) (Switzerland)	Jurabek Karimov; **Antoine Bellier**	4; **6**	2; **6**	**7^{8}** 6^{6}	3; **6**

=== Belgium vs. Brazil ===
Belgium
4
Sleuyter Arena, Ostend, Belgium
16 – 18 September
Hard (i)

Brazil
0

			1	2	3	4	5
1	(Belgium) (Brazil)	**David Goffin**; Thiago Monteiro	**6**; 2	**6**; 2	**6**; 0
2	(Belgium) (Brazil)	**Steve Darcis**; Thomaz Bellucci	6^{5} **7^{7}**	**6**; 1	**6**; 3	**6**; 3
3	(Belgium) (Brazil)	**Ruben Bemelmans / Joris De Loore**; Marcelo Melo / Bruno Soares	3; **6**	**7^{7}** 6^{5}	4; **6**	**6**; 4	**6**; 4
4	(Belgium) (Brazil)	**Joris De Loore**; Thomaz Bellucci	**6**; 3	6^{4} **7^{7}**	**6**; 2
5	(Belgium) (Brazil)	Steve Darcis; Thiago Monteiro						**not** **played**

=== Australia vs. Slovakia ===
Australia
3
Ken Rosewall Arena, Sydney, Australia
16 – 18 September
Grass

Slovakia
0

			1	2	3	4	5
1	(Australia) (Slovakia)	**Nick Kyrgios**; Andrej Martin	**6**; 3	**6**; 2	**6**; 4
2	(Australia) (Slovakia)	**Bernard Tomic**; Jozef Kovalík	**7^{7}** 6^{5}	**6**; 4	**6**; 4
3	(Australia) (Slovakia)	**Sam Groth / John Peers**; Andrej Martin / Igor Zelenay	**6**; 4	**6**; 2	6^{3} **7^{7}**	**7^{7}** 6^{2}
4	(Australia) (Slovakia)	Sam Groth; Jozef Kovalík						**not** **played**
5	(Australia) (Slovakia)	Bernard Tomic; Andrej Martin						**not** **played**

=== Canada vs. Chile ===
Canada
5
Scotiabank Centre, Halifax, Canada
16 – 18 September
Hard (i)

Chile
0

			1	2	3	4	5
1	(Canada) (Chile)	**Frank Dancevic**; Christian Garín	**6**; 3	6^{5} **7^{7}**	**6**; 1	**6**; 4
2	(Canada) (Chile)	**Vasek Pospisil**; Nicolás Jarry	**6**; 1	5; **7**	**7^{7}** 6^{2}	**6**; 3
3	(Canada) (Chile)	**Vasek Pospisil / Adil Shamasdin**; Nicolás Jarry / Hans Podlipnik	**6**; 3	**6**; 4	**7^{8}** 6^{6}
4	(Canada) (Chile)	**Denis Shapovalov**; Christian Garín	**7^{7}** 6^{5}	**6**; 4
5	(Canada) (Chile)	**Frank Dancevic**; Gonzalo Lama	**6**; 4	**6**; 4

=== Russia vs. Kazakhstan ===
Russia
3
National Tennis Center, Moscow, Russia
16 – 18 September
Hard

Kazakhstan
1

			1	2	3	4	5
1	(Russia) (Kazakhstan)	**Andrey Kuznetsov**; Aleksandr Nedovyesov	**6**; 3	**6**; 4	5; **7**	**7**; 5
2	(Russia) (Kazakhstan)	Evgeny Donskoy; **Mikhail Kukushkin**	**7^{9}** 6^{7}	2; **6**	**6**; 4	2; **6**	2; **6**
3	(Russia) (Kazakhstan)	**Konstantin Kravchuk / Andrey Rublev**; Andrey Golubev / Aleksandr Nedovyesov	**6**; 3	6^{3} **7^{7}**	**6**; 2	**7**; 5
4	(Russia) (Kazakhstan)	**Andrey Kuznetsov**; Mikhail Kukushkin	**6**; 1	**6**; 2	**6**; 2
5	(Russia) (Kazakhstan)	Evgeny Donskoy; Aleksandr Nedovyesov						**not** **played**

Friday games were moved to Saturday due to rain. The fifth set of the 2nd game was moved from Saturday to Sunday due to dark.

=== India vs. Spain ===
India
0
R.K. Khanna Tennis Complex, New Delhi, India
16 – 18 September
Hard

Spain
5

			1	2	3	4	5
1	(India) (Spain)	Ramkumar Ramanathan; **Feliciano López**	4; **6**	4; **6**	**6**; 3	1; **6**
2	(India) (Spain)	Saketh Myneni; **David Ferrer**	1; **6**	2; **6**	1; **6**
3	(India) (Spain)	Saketh Myneni / Leander Paes; **Marc López / Rafael Nadal**	**6**; 4	6^{2} **7^{7}**	4; **6**	4; **6**
4	(India) (Spain)	Sumit Nagal; **Marc López**	3; **6**	**6**; 1	3; **6**
5	(India) (Spain)	Ramkumar Ramanathan; **David Ferrer**	2; **6**	2; **6**

=== Germany vs. Poland ===
Germany
3
Rot-Weiss Tennis Club, Berlin, Germany
16 – 18 September
Clay

Poland
2

			1	2	3	4	5
1	(Germany) (Poland)	**Jan-Lennard Struff**; Kamil Majchrzak	6^{8} **7^{10}**	**6**; 3	5; **7**	**6**; 2	**6**; 1
2	(Germany) (Poland)	**Florian Mayer**; Hubert Hurkacz	1; **6**	**7^{8}** 6^{6}	**6**; 4	**7**; 5
3	(Germany) (Poland)	Daniel Brands / Daniel Masur; **Łukasz Kubot / Marcin Matkowski**	**7^{7}** 6^{5}	**6**; 3	3; **6**	4; **6**	2; **6**
4	(Germany) (Poland)	Florian Mayer; **Kamil Majchrzak**	2; **6**	**6**; 4	2; **6**	3; **6**
5	(Germany) (Poland)	**Jan-Lennard Struff**; Hubert Hurkacz	**7^{7}** 6^{4}	**6**; 4	**6**; 1

=== Japan vs. Ukraine ===
Japan
5
Utsubo Tennis Center, Osaka, Japan
16 – 18 September
Hard

Ukraine
0

			1	2	3	4	5
1	(Japan) (Ukraine)	**Taro Daniel**; Sergiy Stakhovsky	**7^{7}** 6^{4}	**7^{7}** 6^{1}	**6**; 1
2	(Japan) (Ukraine)	**Yoshihito Nishioka**; Illya Marchenko	**6**; 4	5; **7**	**6**; 4	**7**; 5
3	(Japan) (Ukraine)	**Kei Nishikori / Yūichi Sugita**; Artem Smirnov / Sergiy Stakhovsky	**6**; 3	**6**; 0	**6**; 3
4	(Japan) (Ukraine)	**Taro Daniel**; Artem Smirnov	3; **6**	**7**; 5	**6**; 1
5	(Japan) (Ukraine)	**Yoshihito Nishioka**; Danylo Kalenichenko	**6**; 2	**6**; 2
