= 2013 Davis Cup Americas Zone Group I =

International tennis competition

The Americas Zone is one of the three zones of regional Davis Cup competition in 2013.

In the Americas Zone there are three different groups in which teams compete against each other to advance to the next group.

== Participating nations ==
Seeds:

1. Chile
2. Colombia

Remaining Nations:

- Dominican Republic
- Ecuador
- Uruguay

=== Draw ===
Second round play-offs
Santo Domingo Este, Dominican Republic (hard)
1	Chile	1
Dominican Republic	4

First round play-offs
1	Chile
bye
Dominican Republic
bye

First round
1	Chile
bye
Ecuador
bye
Montevideo, Uruguay (clay)
Uruguay	3
Dominican Republic	1
bye
2	Colombia

Second round
Manta, Ecuador (hard)
1	Chile	2
Ecuador	3
Cúcuta, Colombia (hard)
Uruguay	0
2	Colombia	5

- Chile relegated to Group II in 2014.
- Ecuador and Colombia advance to World Group Play-off.

== First round ==
=== Uruguay vs. Dominican Republic ===
Uruguay
3
Carrasco Lawn Tennis Club, Montevideo, Uruguay
1–3 February 2013
Clay

Dominican Republic
1

			1	2	3	4	5
1	(Uruguay) (Dominican Republic)	Marcel Felder; Roberto Cid	6; 3	6; 3	6; 2
2	(Uruguay) (Dominican Republic)	Martín Cuevas; José Hernández	4; 6	1; 6	3; 6
3	(Uruguay) (Dominican Republic)	Ariel Behar / Marcel Felder; Henry Estrella / José Hernández	6; 2	6; 4	6; 3
4	(Uruguay) (Dominican Republic)	Marcel Felder; José Hernández	6; 3	3; 6	6; 3	5; 7	6; 2
5	(Uruguay) (Dominican Republic)	Martín Cuevas; Roberto Cid						not played

== Second round ==
=== Ecuador vs. Chile ===
Ecuador
3
Umiña Tenis Club, Manta, Ecuador
5–7 April 2013
Hard

Chile
2

			1	2	3	4	5
1	(Ecuador) (Chile)	Julio César Campozano; Christian Garín	4; 6	6; 2	2; 6	6; 2	9; 7
2	(Ecuador) (Chile)	Emilio Gómez; Paul Capdeville	5; 7	1; 6	5; 7
3	(Ecuador) (Chile)	Diego Hidalgo / Roberto Quiroz; Jorge Aguilar / Paul Capdeville	6; 4	6^{5} 7^{7}	3; 6	5; 7
4	(Ecuador) (Chile)	Julio César Campozano; Paul Capdeville	4; 6	7^{7} 6^{5}	6; 2	4; 1		retired
5	(Ecuador) (Chile)	Emilio Gómez; Christian Garín	6; 4	4; 6	6; 3	7^{7} 6^{1}

=== Colombia vs. Uruguay ===
Colombia
5
Complejo tenístico Fabiola Zuluaga, Cúcuta, Colombia
5–7 April 2013
Hard

Uruguay
0

			1	2	3	4	5
1	(Colombia) (Uruguay)	Santiago Giraldo; Marcel Felder	6; 2	3; 6	6; 1	6; 2
2	(Colombia) (Uruguay)	Alejandro Falla; Ariel Behar	6; 2	6; 0	6; 2
3	(Colombia) (Uruguay)	Juan Sebastián Cabal / Robert Farah; Ariel Behar / Marcel Felder	6; 4	3; 6	6; 3	5; 7	6; 4
4	(Colombia) (Uruguay)	Alejandro Falla; Rodrigo Senattore	6; 0	6; 1
5	(Colombia) (Uruguay)	Juan Sebastián Cabal; Santiago Maresca	6; 1	6; 0

== Second round play-off ==
=== Chile vs. Dominican Republic ===
Chile
1
Centro Nacional de Tenis Parque del Este, Santo Domingo Este, Dominican Republic
13–15 September 2013
Hard

Dominican Republic
4

			1	2	3	4	5
1	(Chile) (Dominican Republic)	Paul Capdeville; José Hernández	4; 6	6^{3} 7^{7}	5; 7
2	(Chile) (Dominican Republic)	Christian Garin; Víctor Estrella	5; 7	2; 6	4; 6
3	(Chile) (Dominican Republic)	Jorge Aguilar / Nicolás Jarry; Víctor Estrella / José Hernández	6^{10} 7^{12}	4; 6	4; 6
4	(Chile) (Dominican Republic)	Nicolás Jarry; Roberto Cid	4; 6	2; 2				retired
5	(Chile) (Dominican Republic)	Christian Garin; Peter Bertran	7; 5	7; 5
