= 2019 Davis Cup Finals =

- Date: 18–24 November 2019
- Draw: 18 teams
- Surface: Hard indoor
- Location: Madrid, Spain
- Venue: Caja Mágica

Champions
- Spain
- Davis Cup

The Finals, formerly known as World Group, was the highest level of Davis Cup competition in 2019. It was held on indoor hard courts at the Caja Mágica in Madrid, Spain from 18 until 24 November. The ties were contested in a best-of-three rubbers format and were played on one day. There were two singles followed by a doubles.

Croatia were the defending champions, but were eliminated during the round-robin stage.

Spain won the title, defeating Canada in the final, 2–0. It was the Spanish men's national tennis team's first Davis Cup title since 2011 and their sixth Davis Cup title overall. Rafael Nadal was named the Most Valuable Player of the tournament after winning all eight of his matches.

== Participating teams ==
18 nations took part in the Finals.

The qualification were as follows:

- 4 semifinalists of the previous edition
- 2 wild card teams, selected by the Organising Committee that did not have to participate in the Qualifying round
- 12 winners of the qualifying round, in February 2019

=== Overview ===
H = Host nation, TH = Title holder, WC = Wild card

Participating teams
| Argentina (WC) | Australia | Belgium | Canada | Chile | Colombia |
| Croatia (TH) | France | Germany | Great Britain (WC) | Italy | Japan |
| Kazakhstan | Netherlands | Russia | Serbia | Spain (H) | United States |

=== Seeds ===
The seedings were based on the Davis Cup Ranking of 4 February. The top six nations were seeded and drawn into position 1 across groups A-F, the nations ranked from 7 to 12 were drawn randomly into position 2, the remaining nations were drawn randomly into position 3.

1. France (Round robin)
2. Croatia (Round robin)
3. Argentina (Quarterfinals)
4. Belgium (Round robin)
5. Great Britain (Semifinals)
6. United States (Round robin)
7. Spain (Champion)
8. Serbia (Quarterfinals)
9. Australia (Quarterfinals)
10. Italy (Round robin)
11. Germany (Quarterfinals)
12. Kazakhstan (Round robin)
13. Canada (Final)
14. Japan (Round robin)
15. Colombia (Round robin)
16. Netherlands (Round robin)
17. Russia (Semifinals)
18. Chile (Round robin)

== Team nominations ==
Each nation had to submit a team of up to five players at least 20 days before the Monday of the week of the event. If a player became injured or ill severely enough to prevent his participation in the tournament before his team's first match, he would be replaced by another player.

== Format ==
The 18 teams are divided in six round robin groups of three teams each. The six group winners plus the two second-placed teams with the best records based on percentage of matches won (followed by percentage of sets won and then percentage of games won), will qualify for the quarterfinals.

| Day | Round | Number of teams |
|---|---|---|
| 18–21 November (Monday–Thursday) | Round robin | 18 (6 groups of 3 teams) |
| 21–22 November (Thursday–Friday) | Quarterfinals | 8 (6 group winners + 2 best second place) |
| 23 November (Saturday) | Semifinals | 4 (automatically qualified for 2020 Davis Cup Finals) |
| 24 November (Sunday) | Final | 2 |

== Group stage ==
| Qualified for the Knockout stage |

=== Overview ===
T = Ties, M = Matches, S = Sets

| Group | Winners | | | | Runners-up | | | | Third | | | |
| Group | Nation | T | M | S | Nation | T | M | S | Nation | T | M | S |
|---|---|---|---|---|---|---|---|---|---|---|---|---|
| A | Serbia | 2–0 | 5–1 | 10–2 | France | 1–1 | 3–3 | 6–7 | Japan | 0–2 | 1–5 | 3–10 |
| B | Spain | 2–0 | 5–1 | 11–2 | Russia | 1–1 | 4–2 | 8–6 | Croatia | 0–2 | 0–6 | 1–12 |
| C | Germany | 2–0 | 5–1 | 11–4 | Argentina | 1–1 | 3–3 | 8–6 | Chile | 0–2 | 1–5 | 2–11 |
| D | Australia | 2–0 | 5–1 | 10–3 | Belgium | 1–1 | 3–3 | 7–7 | Colombia | 0–2 | 1–5 | 4–11 |
| E | Great Britain | 2–0 | 4–2 | 10–5 | Kazakhstan | 1–1 | 3–3 | 7–7 | Netherlands | 0–2 | 2–4 | 5–10 |
| F | Canada | 2–0 | 4–2 | 9–5 | United States | 1–1 | 3–3 | 7–8 | Italy | 0–2 | 2–4 | 7–10 |

=== Group A ===
| Pos. | Country | Ties | Matches | Sets | Sets % | Games | Games % |
|---|---|---|---|---|---|---|---|
| 1 | Serbia | 2–0 | 5–1 | 10–2 | 83% | 72–50 | 59% |
| 2 | France | 1–1 | 3–3 | 6–7 | 46% | 67–66 | 50% |
| 3 | Japan | 0–2 | 1–5 | 3–10 | 23% | 53–76 | 41% |

==== France vs. Japan ====
France
2
Estadio Arantxa Sánchez Vicario
19 November 2019

Japan
1

| | | | 1 | 2 | 3 |
|---|---|---|---|---|---|
| 1 | (France) (Japan) | Jo-Wilfried Tsonga; Yasutaka Uchiyama | 6; 2 | 6; 1 |
| 2 | (France) (Japan) | Gaël Monfils; Yoshihito Nishioka | 5; 7 | 2; 6 |
| 3 | (France) (Japan) | Pierre-Hugues Herbert / Nicolas Mahut; Ben McLachlan / Yasutaka Uchiyama | 6^{4} 7^{7} | 6; 4 | 7; 5 |

==== Serbia vs. Japan ====
Serbia
3
Estadio Manolo Santana
20 November 2019

Japan
0

| | | | 1 | 2 | 3 |
|---|---|---|---|---|---|
| 1 | (Serbia) (Japan) | Filip Krajinović; Yūichi Sugita | 6; 2 | 6; 4 |
| 2 | (Serbia) (Japan) | Novak Djokovic; Yoshihito Nishioka | 6; 1 | 6; 2 |
| 3 | (Serbia) (Japan) | Janko Tipsarević / Viktor Troicki; Ben McLachlan / Yasutaka Uchiyama | 7^{7} 6^{5} | 7^{7} 6^{4} |

==== France vs. Serbia ====
France
1
Estadio Manolo Santana
21 November 2019

Serbia
2

| | | | 1 | 2 | 3 |
|---|---|---|---|---|---|
| 1 | (France) (Serbia) | Jo-Wilfried Tsonga; Filip Krajinović | 5; 7 | 6^{5} 7^{7} |
| 2 | (France) (Serbia) | Benoît Paire; Novak Djokovic | 3; 6 | 3; 6 |
| 3 | (France) (Serbia) | Pierre-Hugues Herbert / Nicolas Mahut; Janko Tipsarević / Viktor Troicki | 6; 4 | 6; 4 |

=== Group B ===
| Pos. | Country | Ties | Matches | Sets | Sets % | Games | Games % |
|---|---|---|---|---|---|---|---|
| 1 | Spain | 2–0 | 5–1 | 11–2 | 85% | 77–53 | 59% |
| 2 | Russia | 1–1 | 4–2 | 8–6 | 57% | 78–72 | 52% |
| 3 | Croatia | 0–2 | 0–6 | 1–12 | 8% | 49–79 | 38% |

==== Croatia vs. Russia ====
Croatia
0
Estadio Manolo Santana
18 November 2019

Russia
3

| | | | 1 | 2 | 3 |
|---|---|---|---|---|---|
| 1 | (Croatia) (Russia) | Borna Gojo; Andrey Rublev | 3; 6 | 3; 6 |
| 2 | (Croatia) (Russia) | Borna Ćorić; Karen Khachanov | 7^{7} 6^{4} | 4; 6 | 4; 6 |
| 3 | (Croatia) (Russia) | Ivan Dodig / Nikola Mektić; Karen Khachanov / Andrey Rublev | 6^{3} 7^{7} | 4; 6 |

==== Spain vs. Russia ====
Spain
2
Estadio Manolo Santana
19 November 2019

Russia
1

| | | | 1 | 2 | 3 |
|---|---|---|---|---|---|
| 1 | (Spain) (Russia) | Roberto Bautista Agut; Andrey Rublev | 6; 3 | 3; 6 | 6^{0} 7^{7} |
| 2 | (Spain) (Russia) | Rafael Nadal; Karen Khachanov | 6; 3 | 7^{9} 6^{7} |
| 3 | (Spain) (Russia) | Marcel Granollers / Feliciano López; Karen Khachanov / Andrey Rublev | 6; 4 | 7^{7} 6^{5} |

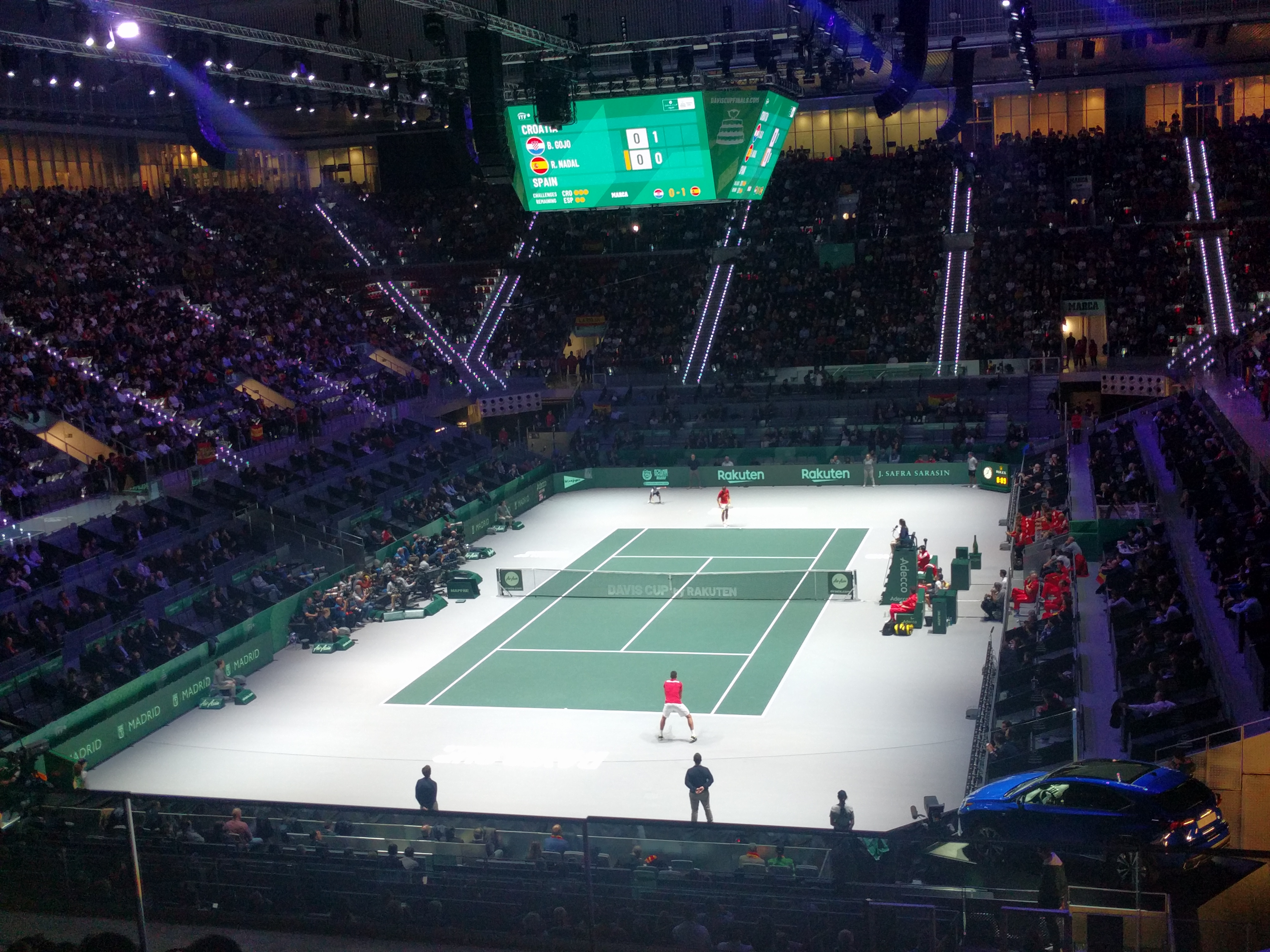
Spain vs Croatia at Caja Mágica.

==== Croatia vs. Spain ====
Croatia
0
Estadio Manolo Santana
20 November 2019

Spain
3

| | | | 1 | 2 | 3 |
|---|---|---|---|---|---|
| 1 | (Croatia) (Spain) | Nikola Mektić; Roberto Bautista Agut | 1; 6 | 3; 6 |
| 2 | (Croatia) (Spain) | Borna Gojo; Rafael Nadal | 4; 6 | 3; 6 |
| 3 | (Croatia) (Spain) | Ivan Dodig / Mate Pavić; Marcel Granollers / Rafael Nadal | 3; 6 | 4; 6 |

=== Group C ===
| Pos. | Country | Ties | Matches | Sets | Sets % | Games | Games % |
|---|---|---|---|---|---|---|---|
| 1 | Germany | 2–0 | 5–1 | 11–4 | 73% | 90–77 | 54% |
| 2 | Argentina | 1–1 | 3–3 | 8–6 | 57% | 78–65 | 55% |
| 3 | Chile | 0–2 | 1–5 | 2–11 | 15% | 55–81 | 40% |

==== Argentina vs. Chile ====
Argentina
3
Estadio Manolo Santana
19 November 2019

Chile
0

| | | | 1 | 2 | 3 |
|---|---|---|---|---|---|
| 1 | (Argentina) (Chile) | Guido Pella; Nicolás Jarry | 6; 4 | 6; 3 |
| 2 | (Argentina) (Chile) | Diego Schwartzman; Cristian Garín | 6; 2 | 6; 2 |
| 3 | (Argentina) (Chile) | Máximo González / Leonardo Mayer; Nicolás Jarry / Hans Podlipnik Castillo | 6; 3 | 7; 5 |

==== Argentina vs. Germany ====
Argentina
0
Estadio Arantxa Sánchez Vicario
20 November 2019

Germany
3

| | | | 1 | 2 | 3 |
|---|---|---|---|---|---|
| 1 | (Argentina) (Germany) | Guido Pella; Philipp Kohlschreiber | 6; 1 | 3; 6 | 4; 6 |
| 2 | (Argentina) (Germany) | Diego Schwartzman; Jan-Lennard Struff | 3; 6 | 6^{8} 7^{10} |
| 3 | (Argentina) (Germany) | Máximo González / Leonardo Mayer; Kevin Krawietz / Andreas Mies | 7^{7} 6^{4} | 6^{2} 7^{7} | 6^{18} 7^{20} |

==== Germany vs. Chile ====
Germany
2
Estadio Arantxa Sánchez Vicario
21 November 2019

Chile
1

| | | | 1 | 2 | 3 |
|---|---|---|---|---|---|
| 1 | (Germany) (Chile) | Philipp Kohlschreiber; Nicolás Jarry | 6; 4 | 6; 3 |
| 2 | (Germany) (Chile) | Jan-Lennard Struff; Cristian Garín | 7^{7} 6^{3} | 6^{7} 7^{9} | 6^{8} 7^{10} |
| 3 | (Germany) (Chile) | Kevin Krawietz / Andreas Mies; Marcelo Tomás Barrios Vera / Alejandro Tabilo | 7^{7} 6^{3} | 6; 3 |

=== Group D ===
| Pos. | Country | Ties | Matches | Sets | Sets % | Games | Games % |
|---|---|---|---|---|---|---|---|
| 1 | Australia | 2–0 | 5–1 | 10–3 | 77% | 67–56 | 54% |
| 2 | Belgium | 1–1 | 3–3 | 7–7 | 50% | 70–63 | 53% |
| 3 | Colombia | 0–2 | 1–5 | 4–11 | 27% | 66–84 | 44% |

==== Belgium vs. Colombia ====
Belgium
2
Estadio 3
18 November 2019

Colombia
1

| | | | 1 | 2 | 3 |
|---|---|---|---|---|---|
| 1 | (Belgium) (Colombia) | Steve Darcis; Santiago Giraldo | 6; 3 | 6; 2 |
| 2 | (Belgium) (Colombia) | David Goffin; Daniel Elahi Galán | 3; 6 | 6; 3 | 6; 3 |
| 3 | (Belgium) (Colombia) | Sander Gillé / Joran Vliegen; Juan Sebastián Cabal / Robert Farah | 7^{7} 6^{5} | 4; 6 | 6^{3} 7^{7} |

==== Australia vs. Colombia ====
Australia
3
Estadio 3
19 November 2019

Colombia
0

| | | | 1 | 2 | 3 |
|---|---|---|---|---|---|
| 1 | (Australia) (Colombia) | Nick Kyrgios; Alejandro González | 6; 4 | 6; 4 |
| 2 | (Australia) (Colombia) | Alex de Minaur; Daniel Elahi Galán | 6; 4 | 6; 3 |
| 3 | (Australia) (Colombia) | John Peers / Jordan Thompson; Juan Sebastián Cabal / Robert Farah | 6; 3 | 3; 6 | 7^{8} 6^{6} |

==== Belgium vs. Australia ====
Belgium
1
Estadio 3
20 November 2019

Australia
2

| | | | 1 | 2 | 3 |
|---|---|---|---|---|---|---|
| 1 | (Belgium) (Australia) | Steve Darcis; Nick Kyrgios | 2; 6 | 6^{9} 7^{11} |
| 2 | (Belgium) (Australia) | David Goffin; Alex de Minaur | 0; 6 | 6^{4} 7^{7} |
| 3 | (Belgium) (Australia) | Sander Gillé / Joran Vliegen; John Peers / Jordan Thompson | 0; 1 | | | retired |

Note: Gillé/Vliegen's retirement victory over Peers/Thompson counted as a 6–1, 6–0 win.

=== Group E ===
| Pos. | Country | Ties | Matches | Sets | Sets % | Games Щзмщ | Games % |
|---|---|---|---|---|---|---|---|
| 1 | Great Britain | 2–0 | 4–2 | 10–5 | 67% | 84–71 | 54% |
| 2 | Kazakhstan | 1–1 | 3–3 | 7–7 | 50% | 70–67 | 51% |
| 3 | Netherlands | 0–2 | 2–4 | 5–10 | 33% | 74–90 | 45% |

==== Kazakhstan vs. Netherlands ====
Kazakhstan
2
Estadio 3
19 November 2019

Netherlands
1

| | | | 1 | 2 | 3 |
|---|---|---|---|---|---|
| 1 | (Kazakhstan) (Netherlands) | Mikhail Kukushkin; Botic van de Zandschulp | 6; 2 | 6; 2 |
| 2 | (Kazakhstan) (Netherlands) | Alexander Bublik; Robin Haase | 5; 7 | 6; 3 | 6^{5} 7^{7} |
| 3 | (Kazakhstan) (Netherlands) | Mikhail Kukushkin / Alexander Bublik; Robin Haase / Jean-Julien Rojer | 6; 4 | 7^{7} 6^{2} |

==== Great Britain vs. Netherlands ====
Great Britain
2
Estadio 3
20 November 2019

Netherlands
1

| | | | 1 | 2 | 3 |
|---|---|---|---|---|---|
| 1 | (United Kingdom) (Netherlands) | Andy Murray; Tallon Griekspoor | 6^{7} 7^{9} | 6; 4 | 7^{7} 6^{5} |
| 2 | (United Kingdom) (Netherlands) | Dan Evans; Robin Haase | 6; 3 | 6^{5} 7^{7} | 4; 6 |
| 3 | (United Kingdom) (Netherlands) | Jamie Murray / Neal Skupski; Wesley Koolhof / Jean-Julien Rojer | 6; 4 | 7^{8} 6^{6} |

==== Great Britain vs. Kazakhstan ====
Great Britain
2
Estadio 3
21 November 2019

Kazakhstan
1

| | | | 1 | 2 | 3 |
|---|---|---|---|---|---|
| 1 | (United Kingdom) (Kazakhstan) | Kyle Edmund; Mikhail Kukushkin | 6; 3 | 6; 3 |
| 2 | (United Kingdom) (Kazakhstan) | Dan Evans; Alexander Bublik | 7; 5 | 4; 6 | 1; 6 |
| 3 | (United Kingdom) (Kazakhstan) | Jamie Murray / Neal Skupski; Alexander Bublik / Mikhail Kukushkin | 6; 1 | 6; 4 |

=== Group F ===
| Pos. | Country | Ties | Matches | Sets | Sets % | Games | Games % |
|---|---|---|---|---|---|---|---|
| 1 | Canada | 2–0 | 4–2 | 9–5 | 64% | 72–78 | 48% |
| 2 | United States | 1–1 | 3–3 | 7–8 | 47% | 84–77 | 52% |
| 3 | Italy | 0–2 | 2–4 | 7–10 | 41% | 95–96 | 50% |

==== Italy vs. Canada ====
Italy
1
Estadio Arantxa Sánchez Vicario
18 November 2019

Canada
2

| | | | 1 | 2 | 3 |
|---|---|---|---|---|---|
| 1 | (Italy) (Canada) | Fabio Fognini; Vasek Pospisil | 6^{5} 7^{7} | 5; 7 |
| 2 | (Italy) (Canada) | Matteo Berrettini; Denis Shapovalov | 6^{5} 7^{7} | 7^{7} 6^{3} | 6^{5} 7^{7} |
| 3 | (Italy) (Canada) | Matteo Berrettini / Fabio Fognini; Vasek Pospisil / Denis Shapovalov | 6; 2 | 3; 6 | 6; 3 |

==== United States vs. Canada ====
United States
1
Estadio Arantxa Sánchez Vicario
19 November 2019

Canada
2

| | | | 1 | 2 | 3 |
|---|---|---|---|---|---|---|
| 1 | (United States) (Canada) | Reilly Opelka; Vasek Pospisil | 6^{5} 7^{7} | 6^{7} 7^{9} |
| 2 | (United States) (Canada) | Taylor Fritz; Denis Shapovalov | 6^{6} 7^{8} | 3; 6 |
| 3 | (United States) (Canada) | Sam Querrey / Jack Sock; Vasek Pospisil / Denis Shapovalov | | | | w/o |

Note: Querrey/Sock's walkover victory over Pospisil/Shapovalov counted as a 6–0, 6–0 win.

==== United States vs. Italy ====
United States
2
Estadio Arantxa Sánchez Vicario
20 November 2019

Italy
1

| | | | 1 | 2 | 3 |
|---|---|---|---|---|---|
| 1 | (United States) (Italy) | Reilly Opelka; Fabio Fognini | 4; 6 | 7^{7} 6^{4} | 3; 6 |
| 2 | (United States) (Italy) | Taylor Fritz; Matteo Berrettini | 5; 7 | 7^{7} 6^{5} | 6; 2 |
| 3 | (United States) (Italy) | Sam Querrey / Jack Sock; Simone Bolelli / Fabio Fognini | 6^{4} 7^{7} | 7^{7} 6^{2} | 6; 4 |

== Knockout stage ==
=== Bracket ===
Quarterfinals
22 November
8 | Serbia | 1
17 | Russia | 2
21 November
9 | Australia | 1
13 | Canada | 2
22 November
5 | Great Britain | 2
11 | Germany | 0
22 November
3 | Argentina | 1
7 | Spain | 2

Semifinals
23 November
17 | Russia | 1
13 | Canada | 2
23 November
5 | Great Britain | 1
7 | Spain | 2

Final
24 November
13 | Canada | 0
7 | Spain | 2

=== Quarterfinals ===
==== Australia vs. Canada ====
Australia
1
Estadio Manolo Santana
21 November 2019

Canada
2

| | | | 1 | 2 | 3 |
|---|---|---|---|---|---|
| 1 | (Australia) (Canada) | John Millman; Vasek Pospisil | 6^{7} 7^{9} | 4; 6 |
| 2 | (Australia) (Canada) | Alex de Minaur; Denis Shapovalov | 3; 6 | 6; 3 | 7; 5 |
| 3 | (Australia) (Canada) | John Peers / Jordan Thompson; Vasek Pospisil / Denis Shapovalov | 4; 6 | 4; 6 |

==== Serbia vs. Russia ====
Serbia
1
Estadio Manolo Santana
22 November 2019

Russia
2

| | | | 1 | 2 | 3 |
|---|---|---|---|---|---|
| 1 | (Serbia) (Russia) | Filip Krajinović; Andrey Rublev | 1; 6 | 2; 6 |
| 2 | (Serbia) (Russia) | Novak Djokovic; Karen Khachanov | 6; 3 | 6; 3 |
| 3 | (Serbia) (Russia) | Novak Djokovic / Viktor Troicki; Karen Khachanov / Andrey Rublev | 4; 6 | 6; 4 | 6^{8} 7^{10} |

==== Great Britain vs. Germany ====
Great Britain
2
Estadio Arantxa Sánchez Vicario
22 November 2019

Germany
0

| | | | 1 | 2 | 3 |
|---|---|---|---|---|---|---|
| 1 | (United Kingdom) (Germany) | Kyle Edmund; Philipp Kohlschreiber | 6; 3 | 7; 5 |
| 2 | (United Kingdom) (Germany) | Dan Evans; Jan-Lennard Struff | 7^{8} 6^{6} | 3; 6 | 7^{7} 6^{2} |
| 3 | (United Kingdom) (Germany) | Jamie Murray / Neal Skupski; Kevin Krawietz / Andreas Mies | | | | not played |

==== Argentina vs. Spain ====
Argentina
1
Estadio Manolo Santana
22 November 2019

Spain
2

| | | | 1 | 2 | 3 |
|---|---|---|---|---|---|
| 1 | (Argentina) (Spain) | Guido Pella; Pablo Carreño Busta | 6^{3} 7^{7} | 7^{7} 6^{4} | 6; 1 |
| 2 | (Argentina) (Spain) | Diego Schwartzman; Rafael Nadal | 1; 6 | 2; 6 |
| 3 | (Argentina) (Spain) | Máximo González / Leonardo Mayer; Marcel Granollers / Rafael Nadal | 4; 6 | 6; 4 | 3; 6 |

=== Semifinals ===
==== Russia vs. Canada ====
Russia
1
Estadio Manolo Santana
23 November 2019

Canada
2

| | | | 1 | 2 | 3 |
|---|---|---|---|---|---|
| 1 | (Russia) (Canada) | Andrey Rublev; Vasek Pospisil | 6; 4 | 6; 4 |
| 2 | (Russia) (Canada) | Karen Khachanov; Denis Shapovalov | 4; 6 | 6; 4 | 4; 6 |
| 3 | (Russia) (Canada) | Karen Khachanov / Andrey Rublev; Vasek Pospisil / Denis Shapovalov | 3; 6 | 6; 3 | 6^{5} 7^{7} |

==== Great Britain vs. Spain ====
Great Britain
1
Estadio Manolo Santana
23 November 2019

Spain
2

| | | | 1 | 2 | 3 |
|---|---|---|---|---|---|
| 1 | (United Kingdom) (Spain) | Kyle Edmund; Feliciano López | 6; 3 | 7^{7} 6^{3} |
| 2 | (United Kingdom) (Spain) | Dan Evans; Rafael Nadal | 4; 6 | 0; 6 |
| 3 | (United Kingdom) (Spain) | Jamie Murray / Neal Skupski; Feliciano López / Rafael Nadal | 6^{3} 7^{7} | 6^{8} 7^{10} |

=== Final ===
==== Canada vs. Spain ====
Canada
0
Estadio Manolo Santana
24 November 2019

Spain
2

| | | | 1 | 2 | 3 |
|---|---|---|---|---|---|---|
| 1 | (Canada) (Spain) | Félix Auger-Aliassime; Roberto Bautista Agut | 6^{3} 7^{7} | 3; 6 |
| 2 | (Canada) (Spain) | Denis Shapovalov; Rafael Nadal | 3; 6 | 6^{7} 7^{9} |
| 3 | (Canada) (Spain) | Vasek Pospisil / Denis Shapovalov; Marcel Granollers / Feliciano López | | | | not played |
