= Coliseo La Tortuga =

Indoor sporting arena in Talcahuano, Chile

- La Tortuga de Talcahuano
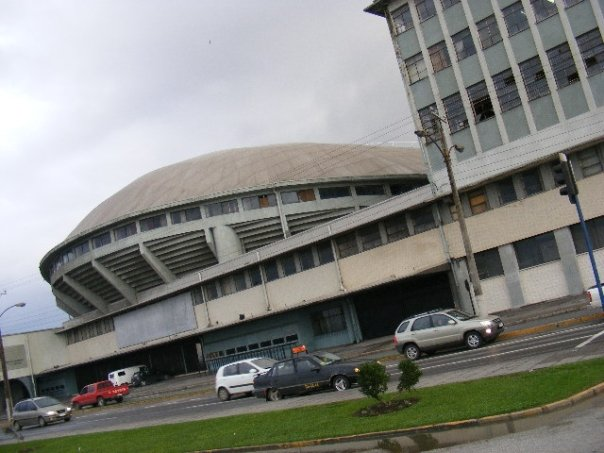
- Interactive map of Coliseo La Tortuga
- Location: Talcahuano, Chile
- Coordinates: 36°43′12″S 73°6′31″W
- Capacity: 5,000

Construction
- Groundbreaking: 1957
- Opened: 1980
- Renovated: 2015
- Architect: José Llambías

Coliseo La Tortuga is an indoor sporting arena located in Talcahuano, Chile. The capacity of the arena is 5,000 spectators and it is used mostly for basketball.

El Coliseo La Tortuga Monumental, known popularly as La Tortuga de Talcahuano, is a sports and entertainment centre, renowned for its distinctive roof, which is similar to a shell of a turtle. Located in the northern section of El Arenal, in the city of Talcahuano, it is located exactly at the intersection of Avenida Manuel Blanco Encalada and Arturo Prat street just in front of Paseo Ventana al Mar.

With its 13,850 m^{2} of floor area and capacity for 5 thousand spectators, it was until recent years the largest building of its kind in Chile.
