= 2022 Challenger Coquimbo II – Doubles =

Doubles
- 2022 Challenger Coquimbo II

Final
- Champions: (Italy) Franco Agamenone (Argentina) Hernán Casanova
- Runners-up: (Poland) Karol Drzewiecki (Switzerland) Jakub Paul
- Score: 6–3, 6–4

Events
Singles	Doubles
← 2022 ·	Challenger Coquimbo	· 2023 →

Guillermo Durán and Nicolás Mejía were the defending champions but chose not to defend their title.

Franco Agamenone and Hernán Casanova won the title after defeating Karol Drzewiecki and Jakub Paul 6–3, 6–4 in the final.

== Seeds ==
1. (Argentina) Román Andrés Burruchaga / (Argentina) Facundo Díaz Acosta (first round, withdrew)
2. (Argentina) Andrea Collarini / (Argentina) Renzo Olivo (first round, withdrew)
3. (Poland) Piotr Matuszewski / (Peru) Alexander Merino (quarterfinals)
4. (Poland) Karol Drzewiecki / (Switzerland) Jakub Paul (final)

== Draw ==
=== Key ===
- Q = Qualifier
- WC = Wild card
- LL = Lucky loser
- Alt = Alternate
- SE = Special exempt
- PR = Protected ranking
- ITF = ITF entry
- JE = Junior exempt
- w/o = Walkover
- r = Retired
- d = Defaulted
- SR = Special ranking

First round
1	(Argentina) RA Burruchaga (Argentina) F Díaz Acosta
(Chile) Miguel Fernando Pereira (Chile) M Soto	w/o
(Argentina) Thiago Cigarrán (Argentina) Fermín Tenti	5	5
(Switzerland) R Bertola (Switzerland) Mirko Martinez	7	7
4	(Poland) K Drzewiecki (Switzerland) J Paul	6	7^{7}
(Argentina) Juan Ignacio Galarza (Argentina) T Lipovšek Puches	3	6^{4}
(Argentina) JP Paz (Argentina) G Villanueva	6^{4}	5
(Italy) F Agamenone (Argentina) H Casanova	7^{7}	7
WC	(Chile) Christian Leyton (Chile) Raiman Leyton-Moya	1	4
3	(Poland) P Matuszewski (Peru) A Merino	6	6
(Brazil) D Dutra da Silva (Spain) José Francisco Vidal Azorín	3	6	[6]
(Uruguay) I Carou (Argentina) F Comesaña	6	2	[10]
WC	(Chile) Daniel Antonio Núñez (Chile) Sebastián Santibáñez	w/o
2	(Argentina) A Collarini (Argentina) R Olivo

Quarterfinals
(Chile) MF Pereira (Chile) M Soto	w/o
(Switzerland) R Bertola (Switzerland) M Martinez
4	(Poland) K Drzewiecki (Switzerland) J Paul	6	6
(India) S Nagal (Spain) D Rincón	4	3
(Italy) F Agamenone (Argentina) H Casanova	6	6
3	(Poland) P Matuszewski (Peru) A Merino	3	4
(Uruguay) I Carou (Argentina) F Comesaña	3	6	[10]
WC	(Chile) DA Núñez (Chile) S Santibáñez	6	3	[3]

Semifinals
(Chile) MF Pereira (Chile) M Soto	4	6	[5]
4	(Poland) K Drzewiecki (Switzerland) J Paul	6	3	[10]
(Italy) F Agamenone (Argentina) H Casanova	6	6
(Uruguay) I Carou (Argentina) F Comesaña	1	3

Final
4	(Poland) K Drzewiecki (Switzerland) J Paul	3	4
(Italy) F Agamenone (Argentina) H Casanova	6	6
