= 2022 Challenger Coquimbo II – Singles =

Singles
- 2022 Challenger Coquimbo II

Final
- Champion: (Argentina) Juan Manuel Cerúndolo
- Runner-up: (Argentina) Facundo Díaz Acosta
- Score: 6–3, 3–6, 6–4

Events
Singles	Doubles
← 2022 ·	Challenger Coquimbo	· 2023 →

Facundo Díaz Acosta was the defending champion but lost in the final to Juan Manuel Cerúndolo.

Cerúndolo won the title after defeating Díaz Acosta 6–3, 3–6, 6–4 in the final.

== Seeds ==
1. (Argentina) Federico Coria (quarterfinals)
2. (Argentina) Tomás Martín Etcheverry (quarterfinals)
3. (Germany) Daniel Altmaier (first round)
4. (Italy) Marco Cecchinato (quarterfinals)
5. (Argentina) Camilo Ugo Carabelli (second round)
6. (Kazakhstan) Timofey Skatov (semifinals)
7. (Argentina) Juan Manuel Cerúndolo (champion)
8. (Italy) Franco Agamenone (semifinals)

== Draw ==
=== Key ===
- Q = Qualifier
- WC = Wild card
- LL = Lucky loser
- Alt = Alternate
- SE = Special exempt
- PR = Protected ranking
- ITF = ITF entry
- JE = Junior exempt
- w/o = Walkover
- r = Retired
- d = Defaulted
- SR = Special ranking

=== Finals ===
Semifinals
6	(Kazakhstan) Timofey Skatov	2	1
(Argentina) Facundo Díaz Acosta	6	6
8	(Italy) Franco Agamenone	2	2
7	(Argentina) Juan Manuel Cerúndolo	6	6

Final
(Argentina) Facundo Díaz Acosta	3	6	4
7	(Argentina) Juan Manuel Cerúndolo	6	3	6

=== Top half ===
First round
1	(Argentina) F Coria	6	6
(Italy) A Giannessi	4	2
(Argentina) M Navone	3	6	6
(Argentina) JB Torres	6	2	2
(Argentina) N Kicker	6	6
(Argentina) F Comesaña	1	3
Q	(Spain) D Rincón	5	2
6	(Kazakhstan) T Skatov	7	6
4	(Italy) M Cecchinato	6	7
Alt	(Brazil) T Seyboth Wild	2	5
Alt	(Argentina) RA Burruchaga	4	5
Q	(Switzerland) R Bertola	6	7
(Argentina) H Casanova	7^{8}	6^{2}	1
(Argentina) F Díaz Acosta	6^{6}	7^{7}	6
(Argentina) GA Olivieri	4	1
5	(Argentina) C Ugo Carabelli	6	6

Second round
1	(Argentina) F Coria	5	6	6
(Argentina) M Navone	7	2	1
(Argentina) N Kicker	4	6	4
6	(Kazakhstan) T Skatov	6	1	6
4	(Italy) M Cecchinato	6	6
Q	(Switzerland) R Bertola	1	3
(Argentina) F Díaz Acosta	6	6
5	(Argentina) C Ugo Carabelli	3	1

Quarterfinals
1	(Argentina) F Coria	3	6	4
6	(Kazakhstan) T Skatov	6	3	6
4	(Italy) M Cecchinato	3	3
(Argentina) F Díaz Acosta	6	6

Semifinals
6	(Kazakhstan) T Skatov	2	1
(Argentina) F Díaz Acosta	6	6

=== Bottom half ===
First round
8	(Italy) F Agamenone	7	6
Q	(Argentina) Fermín Tenti	5	0
Q	(Switzerland) J Paul	6	6
WC	(Paraguay) D Vallejo	2	3
(Brazil) D Dutra da Silva	6	2	5
(Argentina) A Collarini	1	6	7
Q	(India) S Nagal	6	7^{9}
3	(Germany) D Altmaier	2	6^{7}
7	(Argentina) JM Cerúndolo	6	6
(Argentina) G Villanueva	4	3
WC	(Chile) M Soto	6	6
Alt	(Argentina) JP Paz	2	1
(Argentina) R Olivo	6	3	5
Q	(Spain) José Francisco Vidal Azorín	2	6	7
WC	(Chile) D Fernández Flores	3	1
2	(Argentina) TM Etcheverry	6	6

Second round
8	(Italy) F Agamenone	6	6
Q	(Switzerland) J Paul	4	3
(Argentina) A Collarini	6	6
Q	(India) S Nagal	2	1
7	(Argentina) JM Cerúndolo	6	6
WC	(Chile) M Soto	1	4
Q	(Spain) JF Vidal Azorín	3	1
2	(Argentina) TM Etcheverry	6	6

Quarterfinals
8	(Italy) F Agamenone	4	7	6
(Argentina) A Collarini	6	5	1
7	(Argentina) JM Cerúndolo	4	6	6
2	(Argentina) TM Etcheverry	6	3	4

Semifinals
8	(Italy) F Agamenone	2	2
7	(Argentina) JM Cerúndolo	6	6
