= 2015 Aberto de Tênis do Rio Grande do Sul – Doubles =

Doubles
- 2015 Aberto de Tênis do Rio Grande do Sul
- 2014 Champion: (Argentina) Guido Andreozzi (Argentina) Guillermo Durán

Events
Singles	Doubles
← 2014 ·	Aberto de Tênis do Rio Grande do Sul

Guido Andreozzi and Guillermo Durán are the defending champions, but only Guido Andreozzi is playing in this year's edition.

== Seeds ==
1. (Argentina) Guido Andreozzi / (Peru) Sergio Galdós (first round)
2. (Argentina) Nicolás Kicker / (Argentina) Renzo Olivo (quarterfinals)
3. (Chile) Hans Podlipnik / (Brazil) Caio Zampieri (first round)
4. (Bolivia) Hugo Dellien / (Dominican Republic) José Hernandez-Fernandez (quarterfinals)

== Draw ==
=== Key ===
- Q = Qualifier
- WC = Wild card
- LL = Lucky loser
- Alt = Alternate
- SE = Special exempt
- PR = Protected ranking
- ITF = ITF entry
- JE = Junior exempt
- w/o = Walkover
- r = Retired
- d = Defaulted
- SR = Special ranking

First round
1	(Argentina) G Andreozzi (Peru) S Galdós	5	5
(Argentina) F Argüello (Brazil) R Dutra Silva	7	7
PR	(Portugal) P Sousa (Portugal) L Tavares	5	1
(Brazil) R Hocevar (Brazil) Alexandre Tsuchiya	7	6
4	(Bolivia) H Dellien (Dominican Republic) J Hernandez	6	6
(Brazil) Wilson Leite (Brazil) B Sant'Anna	4	4
(Portugal) G Elias (Portugal) FF Silva	6	6
(Belgium) K Coppejans (France) A Michon	3	3
WC	(Brazil) F Ferreiro (Argentina) M González	7	2	[5]
(Sweden) C Lindell (Brazil) J Pereira	5	6	[10]
WC	(Brazil) O Luz (Brazil) M Zormann	7^{10}	7
3	(Chile) H Podlipnik Castillo (Brazil) C Zampieri	6^{8}	5
(Chile) C Garin (Chile) JC Sáez	6	6
(Brazil) E Dischinger (Argentina) A Velotti	2	1
WC	(Brazil) T Monteiro (Brazil) P Sakamoto	1	3
2	(Argentina) N Kicker (Argentina) R Olivo	6	6

Quarterfinals
(Argentina) F Argüello (Brazil) R Dutra Silva	6	6
(Brazil) R Hocevar (Brazil) A Tsuchiya	2	1
4	(Bolivia) H Dellien (Dominican Republic) J Hernandez	3	6	[2]
(Portugal) G Elias (Portugal) FF Silva	6	2	[10]
(Sweden) C Lindell (Brazil) J Pereira	4	6	[5]
WC	(Brazil) O Luz (Brazil) M Zormann	6	3	[10]
(Chile) C Garin (Chile) JC Sáez	7^{7}	6
2	(Argentina) N Kicker (Argentina) R Olivo	6^{3}	4

Semifinals
(Argentina) F Argüello (Brazil) R Dutra Silva
(Portugal) G Elias (Portugal) FF Silva	w/o
WC	(Brazil) O Luz (Brazil) M Zormann	6^{4}	1
(Chile) C Garin (Chile) JC Sáez	7^{7}	6

Final
(Portugal) G Elias (Portugal) FF Silva	6	6
(Chile) C Garin (Chile) JC Sáez	2	4
