= 2012 Aberto de Tênis do Rio Grande do Sul – Doubles =

Doubles
- 2012 Aberto de Tênis do Rio Grande do Sul

Final
- Champions: (Brazil) Marcelo Demoliner (Brazil) João Souza
- Runners-up: (Germany) Simon Greul (Italy) Alessandro Motti
- Score: 6–3, 3–6, [10–7]

Events
Singles	Doubles
← 2011 ·	Aberto de Tênis do Rio Grande do Sul	· 2013 →

Marcelo Demoliner and João Souza won the final 6–3, 3–6, [10–7] against Simon Greul and Alessandro Motti.

== Seeds ==
1. (Colombia) Juan Sebastián Cabal / (Spain) Rubén Ramírez Hidalgo (quarterfinals)
2. (Brazil) Marcelo Demoliner / (Brazil) João Souza (champions)
3. (Croatia) Nikola Mektić / (Croatia) Antonio Veić (quarterfinals)
4. (Brazil) André Ghem / (Brazil) Diego Matos (quarterfinals)

== Draw ==
=== Key ===
- Q = Qualifier
- WC = Wild card
- LL = Lucky loser
- Alt = Alternate
- SE = Special exempt
- PR = Protected ranking
- ITF = ITF entry
- JE = Junior exempt
- w/o = Walkover
- r = Retired
- d = Defaulted
- SR = Special ranking

=== Draw ===
First round
1	(Colombia) JS Cabal (Spain) R Ramírez Hidalgo	7^{7}	7
(Colombia) A González (United States) W Odesnik	6^{4}	5
(Germany) S Greul (Italy) A Motti	6	7
(Germany) J Reister (Romania) A Ungur	2	5
4	(Brazil) A Ghem (Brazil) Diego Matos	6	6
(Austria) A Haider-Maurer (Netherlands) T Schoorel	1	3
(Slovakia) P Červenák (Germany) A Satschko	4	7^{7}	[10]
(Serbia) B Pašanski (Croatia) F Škugor	6	6^{5}	[8]
(Brazil) G Clezar (Brazil) L Kirche	6	3	[14]
WC	(Brazil) E Dischinger (Brazil) Gabriel Friedrich	4	6	[12]
(Brazil) T Alves (Brazil) J Silva	6	3	[4]
3	(Croatia) N Mektić (Croatia) A Veić	2	6	[10]
WC	(Brazil) R-A Grilli (Colombia) C Salamanca	7^{8}	4	[6]
(Brazil) F de Paula (Brazil) R Hocevar	6^{6}	6	[10]
WC	(Brazil) T Monteiro (Brazil) F Neis	2	2
2	(Brazil) M Demoliner (Brazil) J Souza	6	6

Quarterfinals
1	(Colombia) JS Cabal (Spain) R Ramírez Hidalgo	4	5
(Germany) S Greul (Italy) A Motti	6	7
4	(Brazil) A Ghem (Brazil) Diego Matos	2	1
(Slovakia) P Červenák (Germany) A Satschko	6	6
(Brazil) G Clezar (Brazil) L Kirche	2	7^{7}	[11]
3	(Croatia) N Mektić (Croatia) A Veić	6	6^{2}	[9]
(Brazil) F de Paula (Brazil) R Hocevar	3	2
2	(Brazil) M Demoliner (Brazil) J Souza	6	6

Semifinals
(Germany) S Greul (Italy) A Motti	7	7
(Slovakia) P Červenák (Germany) A Satschko	5	2
(Brazil) G Clezar (Brazil) L Kirche	0^{r}
2	(Brazil) M Demoliner (Brazil) J Souza	2

Final
(Germany) S Greul (Italy) A Motti	3	6	[7]
2	(Brazil) M Demoliner (Brazil) J Souza	6	3	[10]
