= 2014 Aberto de Tênis do Rio Grande do Sul – Doubles =

Doubles
- 2014 Aberto de Tênis do Rio Grande do Sul

Final
- Champions: (Argentina) Guido Andreozzi (Argentina) Guillermo Durán
- Runners-up: (Argentina) Facundo Bagnis (Argentina) Diego Schwartzman
- Score: 6–3, 6–3

Events
Singles	Doubles
← 2013 ·	Aberto de Tênis do Rio Grande do Sul	· 2015 →

Guillermo Durán and Máximo González were the defending champions, but González chose to participate at Shenzhen instead. Durán partnered with Guido Andreozzi and won the title by defeating Facundo Bagnis and Diego Schwartzman 6–3, 6–3 in the final.

== Seeds ==
1. (Argentina) Facundo Bagnis / (Argentina) Diego Schwartzman (final)
2. (Argentina) Guido Andreozzi / (Argentina) Guillermo Durán (champions)
3. (Brazil) Fabiano de Paula / (Brazil) Fernando Romboli (first round)
4. (Brazil) Guilherme Clezar / (Brazil) Fabrício Neis (quarterfinals)

== Draw ==
Key

- Q = Qualifier
- WC = Wild card
- LL = Lucky loser
- Alt = Alternate
- ITF = ITF entry
- PR = Protected ranking
- SR = Special ranking
- SE = Special exempt
- JE = Junior exempt
- JR = Junior Accelerator Programme entrant
- CO = College Accelerator Programme entrant
- NG = Next Gen Accelerator Program entrant
- w/o = Walkover
- r = Retired
- d = Defaulted

=== Draw ===
First round
1	(Argentina) F Bagnis (Argentina) D Schwartzman	7^{7}	7^{7}
(Argentina) N Kicker (Brazil) T Turini	6^{3}	6^{1}
(Slovakia) I Klec (Slovakia) Adrian Sikora	2	6	[7]
WC	(Brazil) E Dischinger (Brazil) R Matos	6	3	[10]
4	(Brazil) G Clezar (Brazil) F Neis	7	6
(Brazil) D Dutra da Silva (Brazil) P Sakamoto	5	4
(Argentina) M Alund (Brazil) C Zampieri	6	7^{7}
(Portugal) G Elias (France) A Michon	4	6^{3}
(Argentina) A Collarini (Argentina) R Olivo	6	6^{6}	[10]
(Brazil) R Hocevar (Brazil) J Pereira	2	7^{8}	[7]
WC	(Brazil) J Menezes (Brazil) E Russi Assumpção	6	6
3	(Brazil) F de Paula (Brazil) F Romboli	3	4
(Germany) R Becker (Italy) F Gaio	6	6
(Brazil) Tiago Lopes (Brazil) Carlos Eduardo Severino	0	2
WC	(Brazil) João Walendowsky (Brazil) M Zormann	2	4
2	(Argentina) G Andreozzi (Argentina) G Durán	6	6

Quarterfinals
1	(Argentina) F Bagnis (Argentina) D Schwartzman	6	6
WC	(Brazil) E Dischinger (Brazil) R Matos	2	3
4	(Brazil) G Clezar (Brazil) F Neis	4	6	[8]
(Argentina) M Alund (Brazil) C Zampieri	6	4	[10]
(Argentina) A Collarini (Argentina) R Olivo	6	6
WC	(Brazil) J Menezes (Brazil) E Russi Assumpção	4	1
(Germany) R Becker (Italy) F Gaio	3	4
2	(Argentina) G Andreozzi (Argentina) G Durán	6	6

Semifinals
1	(Argentina) F Bagnis (Argentina) D Schwartzman	6	6
(Argentina) M Alund (Brazil) C Zampieri	3	1
(Argentina) A Collarini (Argentina) R Olivo	4	6^{2}
2	(Argentina) G Andreozzi (Argentina) G Durán	6	7^{7}

Final
1	(Argentina) F Bagnis (Argentina) D Schwartzman	3	3
2	(Argentina) G Andreozzi (Argentina) G Durán	6	6
