= 2013 Aberto de Tênis do Rio Grande do Sul – Singles =

Singles
- 2013 Aberto de Tênis do Rio Grande do Sul

Final
- Champion: (Argentina) Facundo Argüello
- Runner-up: (Argentina) Máximo González
- Score: 6–4, 6–1

Events
Singles	Doubles
← 2012 ·	Aberto de Tênis do Rio Grande do Sul	· 2014 →

Simon Greul was the defending champion, but chose not to compete.

Facundo Argüello won the title, defeating Máximo González in the final, 6–4, 6–1.

== Seeds ==
1. (Argentina) Guido Pella (second round)
2. (Slovenia) Blaž Kavčič (first round)
3. (Netherlands) Thiemo de Bakker (first round)
4. (Argentina) Martín Alund (second round)
5. (Brazil) Rogério Dutra da Silva (second round)
6. (Portugal) Gastão Elias (first round)
7. (Brazil) João Souza (second round)
8. (Chile) Paul Capdeville (second round)

== Draw ==
=== Key ===
- Q = Qualifier
- WC = Wild card
- LL = Lucky loser
- Alt = Alternate
- SE = Special exempt
- PR = Protected ranking
- ITF = ITF entry
- JE = Junior exempt
- w/o = Walkover
- r = Retired
- d = Defaulted
- SR = Special ranking

=== Finals ===
Semifinals
(Argentina) Máximo González	4	7	6
(Brazil) Guilherme Clezar	6	5	4
(Argentina) Facundo Argüello	7	6
(Portugal) Pedro Sousa	5	1

Final
(Argentina) Máximo González	4	1
(Argentina) Facundo Argüello	6	6

=== Top half ===
First round
1	(Argentina) G Pella	6	6
(Venezuela) D Souto	3	1
(Brazil) A Ghem	6	6
(Dominican Republic) V Estrella	2	1
WC	(Brazil) F Neis	6	3	5
(Argentina) M González	4	6	7
WC	(Brazil) M Demoliner	3	4
5	(Brazil) R Dutra da Silva	6	6
3	(Netherlands) T de Bakker	4	5
WC	(Brazil) T Monteiro	6	7
(Brazil) G Clezar	6	7^{8}
(Argentina) F Bagnis	2	6^{6}
(Brazil) R Hocevar	5	6	7^{7}
(Argentina) A Velotti	7	1	6^{2}
SE	(United States) B Fratangelo	1	6	3
8	(Chile) P Capdeville	6	4	6

Second round
1	(Argentina) G Pella	6	4	4
(Brazil) A Ghem	3	6	6
(Argentina) M González	6	6
5	(Brazil) R Dutra da Silva	3	2
WC	(Brazil) T Monteiro	6	3	2
(Brazil) G Clezar	1	6	6
(Brazil) R Hocevar	6	6
8	(Chile) P Capdeville	2	1

Quarterfinals
(Brazil) A Ghem	6	3	3
(Argentina) M González	2	6	6
(Brazil) G Clezar	6	6
(Brazil) R Hocevar	1	2

Semifinals
(Argentina) M González	4	7	6
(Brazil) G Clezar	6	5	4

=== Bottom half ===
First round
7	(Brazil) J Souza	6	7^{7}
(Ecuador) JC Campozano	1	6^{1}
Q	(Argentina) A Collarini	1	2
(Argentina) G Andreozzi	6	6
(Argentina) F Argüello	6	7
(Argentina) P Heras	2	5
WC	(Brazil) E Dischinger	1	6	5
4	(Argentina) M Alund	6	4	7
6	(Portugal) G Elias	3	4
Q	(Italy) G Quinzi	6	6
Q	(Spain) C Gómez-Herrera	2	3
(Brazil) L Kirche	6	3
Q	(Dominican Republic) J Hernández	1	6	6
PR	(Argentina) E Schwank	6	4	3
(Portugal) P Sousa	6	6
2	(Slovenia) B Kavčič	3	4

Second round
7	(Brazil) J Souza	2	2
(Argentina) G Andreozzi	6	6
(Argentina) F Argüello	4	6	6
4	(Argentina) M Alund	6	0	3
Q	(Italy) G Quinzi	6	6
(Brazil) L Kirche	2	2
Q	(Dominican Republic) J Hernández	2	0
(Portugal) P Sousa	6	6

Quarterfinals
(Argentina) G Andreozzi	4	3
(Argentina) F Argüello	6	6
Q	(Italy) G Quinzi	6	0	6^{1}
(Portugal) P Sousa	3	6	7^{7}

Semifinals
(Argentina) F Argüello	7	6
(Portugal) P Sousa	5	1
