= 2014 Aberto de Tênis do Rio Grande do Sul – Singles =

Singles
- 2014 Aberto de Tênis do Rio Grande do Sul

Final
- Champion: (Argentina) Carlos Berlocq
- Runner-up: (Argentina) Diego Schwartzman
- Score: 6–4, 4–6, 6–0

Events
Singles	Doubles
← 2013 ·	Aberto de Tênis do Rio Grande do Sul	· 2015 →

Facundo Argüello was the defending champion, but lost in the quarterfinals to Guido Andreozzi.

Carlos Berlocq won the title by defeating Diego Schwartzman 6–4, 4–6, 6–0 in the final.

== Seeds ==
1. (Argentina) Carlos Berlocq (champion)
2. (Argentina) Diego Schwartzman
3. (Argentina) Facundo Bagnis (second round)
4. (Argentina) Facundo Argüello (quarterfinals)
5. (Portugal) Gastão Elias (quarterfinals)
6. (Argentina) Guido Andreozzi (semifinals)
7. (France) Axel Michon (first round)
8. (Brazil) Guilherme Clezar (quarterfinals)

== Draw ==
=== Key ===
- Q = Qualifier
- WC = Wild card
- LL = Lucky loser
- Alt = Alternate
- SE = Special exempt
- PR = Protected ranking
- ITF = ITF entry
- JE = Junior exempt
- w/o = Walkover
- r = Retired
- d = Defaulted
- SR = Special ranking

=== Finals ===
Semifinals
1	(Argentina) Carlos Berlocq	6	6
(France) Gianni Mina	1	2
6	(Argentina) Guido Andreozzi	1	2
2	(Argentina) Diego Schwartzman	6	6

Final
1	(Argentina) Carlos Berlocq	6	4	6
2	(Argentina) Diego Schwartzman	4	6	0

=== Top half ===
First round
1	(Argentina) C Berlocq	6	6
(Argentina) A Collarini	4	1
(Barbados) D King	2	6	7
(Brazil) J Pereira	6	3	6^{4}
(Brazil) F de Paula	3	1
(Germany) R Becker	6	6
(Italy) F Gaio	4	1
5	(Portugal) G Elias	6	6
3	(Argentina) F Bagnis	6	6
Q	(Brazil) C Zampieri	1	3
(France) G Mina	6	6
(Brazil) Tiago Lopes	4	1
(Slovakia) Adrian Sikora	6	6
WC	(Brazil) F Neis	2	3
Q	(Brazil) D Dutra da Silva	4	1
8	(Brazil) G Clezar	6	6

Second round
1	(Argentina) C Berlocq	6	6
(Barbados) D King	3	2
(Germany) R Becker	3	2
5	(Portugal) G Elias	6	6
3	(Argentina) F Bagnis	7^{7}	3	3
(France) G Mina	6^{4}	6	6
(Slovakia) A Sikora	3	4
8	(Brazil) G Clezar	6	6

Quarterfinals
1	(Argentina) C Berlocq	6	3	6
5	(Portugal) G Elias	3	6	4
(France) G Mina	6	6
8	(Brazil) G Clezar	3	2

Semifinals
1	(Argentina) C Berlocq	6	6
(France) G Mina	1	2

=== Bottom half ===
First round
6	(Argentina) G Andreozzi	6	7^{7}
(Slovakia) I Klec	1	6^{4}
WC	(Brazil) M Zormann	6^{2}	2
(Chile) C Garin	7^{7}	6
Q	(Brazil) J Menezes	6	6
(Brazil) R Hocevar	4	3
(Brazil) A Ghem	4	3
4	(Argentina) F Argüello	6	6
7	(France) A Michon	6	6
WC	(Brazil) E Russi Assumpção	1	1
(Argentina) M Alund	6	6
(Brazil) T Turini	1	1
(Argentina) R Olivo	6	6
WC	(Brazil) R Matos	4	1
(Argentina) N Kicker	1	1
2	(Argentina) D Schwartzman	6	6

Second round
6	(Argentina) G Andreozzi	4	6	7^{7}
(Chile) C Garin	6	2	6^{2}
Q	(Brazil) J Menezes	5	6	1
4	(Argentina) F Argüello	7	3	6
7	(France) A Michon	2	0
(Argentina) M Alund	6	6
(Argentina) R Olivo	4	3
2	(Argentina) D Schwartzman	6	6

Quarterfinals
6	(Argentina) G Andreozzi	7	6
4	(Argentina) F Argüello	5	1
(Argentina) M Alund	1	7^{9}	1
2	(Argentina) D Schwartzman	6	6^{7}	6

Semifinals
6	(Argentina) G Andreozzi	1	2
2	(Argentina) D Schwartzman	6	6
