= 2016 Grand Prix Hassan II – Singles =

Singles
- 2016 Grand Prix Hassan II

Final
- Champion: (Argentina) Federico Delbonis
- Runner-up: (Croatia) Borna Ćorić
- Score: 6–2, 6–4

Events
Singles	Doubles
- Grand Prix Hassan II

Martin Kližan was the defending champion, but withdrew before the tournament began.

Federico Delbonis won the title, defeating Borna Ćorić in the final, 6–2, 6–4.

== Seeds ==
The top four seeds receive a bye into the second round.

1. (Spain) Guillermo García López (quarterfinals)
2. (Portugal) João Sousa (second round)
3. (Croatia) Borna Ćorić (final)
4. (Argentina) Federico Delbonis (champion)
5. (Russia) Teymuraz Gabashvili (first round)
6. (Spain) Albert Ramos Viñolas (first round)
7. (Spain) Pablo Carreño Busta (quarterfinals)
8. (Czech Republic) Jiří Veselý (semifinals)

== Draw ==
Key

- Q = Qualifier
- WC = Wild card
- LL = Lucky loser
- Alt = Alternate
- ITF = ITF entry
- PR = Protected ranking
- SR = Special ranking
- SE = Special exempt
- JE = Junior exempt
- JR = Junior Accelerator Programme entrant
- CO = College Accelerator Programme entrant
- NG = Next Gen Accelerator Program entrant
- w/o = Walkover
- r = Retired
- d = Defaulted

=== Finals ===
Semifinals
8	(Czech Republic) Jiří Veselý	6^{5}	6^{5}
3	(Croatia) Borna Ćorić	7^{7}	7^{7}
4	(Argentina) Federico Delbonis	6	6
(Spain) Albert Montañés	4	3

Final
3	(Croatia) Borna Ćorić	2	4
4	(Argentina) Federico Delbonis	6	6

=== Top half ===
First round
(Moldova) R Albot	4	3
(Spain) N Almagro	6	6
Q	(Croatia) N Mektić	7	6
WC	(Morocco) R El Amrani	5	3
(Spain) Í Cervantes	1	3
8	(Czech Republic) J Veselý	6	6
(Italy) S Bolelli	7	6
(Japan) T Daniel	5	4
Q	(Argentina) M González	6	6
(Spain) D Muñoz de la Nava	1	4
(France) P-H Mathieu	7	6
6	(Spain) A Ramos Viñolas	5	3

Second round
1	(Spain) G García López	1	6	6
(Spain) N Almagro	6	3	4
Q	(Croatia) N Mektić	7^{7}	3	6^{5}
8	(Czech Republic) J Veselý	6^{4}	6	7^{7}
3	(Croatia) B Ćorić	w/o
(Italy) S Bolelli
Q	(Argentina) M González	6^{4}	0
(France) P-H Mathieu	7^{7}	6

Quarterfinals
1	(Spain) G García López	4	6^{2}
8	(Czech Republic) J Veselý	6	7^{7}
3	(Croatia) B Ćorić	6^{6}	6	6
(France) P-H Mathieu	7^{8}	3	4

Semifinals
8	(Czech Republic) J Veselý	6^{5}	6^{5}
3	(Croatia) B Ćorić	7^{7}	7^{7}

=== Bottom half ===
First round
7	(Spain) P Carreño Busta	6	6
(Russia) E Donskoy	2	3
Q	(Italy) L Giustino	6^{1}	4
(Uzbekistan) D Istomin	7^{7}	6
WC	(Morocco) A Ahouda	5	6^{2}
(Netherlands) T de Bakker	7	7^{7}
5	(Russia) T Gabashvili	3	4
(Spain) D Gimeno Traver	6	6
Q	(Croatia) F Škugor	4	4
(Spain) A Montañés	6	6
(Argentina) F Bagnis	7^{7}	6
WC	(Morocco) L Ouahab	6^{2}	2

Second round
7	(Spain) P Carreño Busta	6	7^{7}
(Uzbekistan) D Istomin	3	6^{5}
(Netherlands) T de Bakker	4	4
4	(Argentina) F Delbonis	6	6
(Spain) D Gimeno Traver	4	4
(Spain) A Montañés	6	6
(Argentina) F Bagnis	6	6
2	(Portugal) J Sousa	2	4

Quarterfinals
7	(Spain) P Carreño Busta	5	2
4	(Argentina) F Delbonis	7	6
(Spain) A Montañés	6	7
(Argentina) F Bagnis	1	5

Semifinals
4	(Argentina) F Delbonis	6	6
(Spain) A Montañés	4	3

== Qualifying ==
=== Seeds ===
1. (France) Kenny de Schepper (first round)
2. (Sweden) Elias Ymer (qualifying competition)
3. (Argentina) Máximo González (qualified)
4. (Belgium) Kimmer Coppejans (first round)
5. (Russia) Andrey Rublev (qualifying competition)
6. (Croatia) Franko Škugor (qualified)
7. (France) Mathias Bourgue (qualifying competition)
8. (France) Tristan Lamasine (withdrew)

=== Qualifiers ===
1. (Croatia) Nikola Mektić
2. (Croatia) Franko Škugor
3. (Argentina) Máximo González
4. (Italy) Lorenzo Giustino

=== Qualifying draw ===
==== First qualifier ====
First round
1	(France) Kenny de Schepper	6	2	4
(Croatia) Nikola Mektić	2	6	6
(France) Maxime Chazal	6	6^{3}	6
Alt	(Argentina) Guillermo Durán	2	7^{7}	2

Qualifying competition
(Croatia) Nikola Mektić	7^{8}	6
(France) Maxime Chazal	6^{6}	3

==== Second qualifier ====
First round
2	(Sweden) Elias Ymer	6	6
(Russia) Ivan Nedelko	2	3
WC	(Morocco) Yassine Idmbarek	1	1
6	(Croatia) Franko Škugor	6	6

Qualifying competition
2	(Sweden) Elias Ymer	4	6	2
6	(Croatia) Franko Škugor	6	4	6

==== Third qualifier ====
First round
3	(Argentina) Máximo González	6	6
(Spain) Gerard Granollers	1	4
(France) Maxime Hamou	2	2
7	(France) Mathias Bourgue	6	6

Qualifying competition
3	(Argentina) Máximo González	6	6
7	(France) Mathias Bourgue	4	2

==== Fourth qualifier ====
First round
4	(Belgium) Kimmer Coppejans	7	4	3
(Italy) Lorenzo Giustino	5	6	6
WC	(Morocco) Taha Tifnouti	1	0
5	(Russia) Andrey Rublev	6	6

Qualifying competition
(Italy) Lorenzo Giustino	6	6
5	(Russia) Andrey Rublev	4	3
