= 2016 Grand Prix Hassan II =

- Date: 4–10 April
- Edition: 32nd
- Draw: 28S / 16D
- Prize money: €463,520
- Surface: Clay / outdoor
- Location: Marrakesh, Morocco

Champions

Singles
- (Argentina) Federico Delbonis

Doubles
- (Argentina) Guillermo Durán / (Argentina) Máximo González
- Grand Prix Hassan II

The 2016 Grand Prix Hassan II was a professional men's tennis tournament played on clay courts. It was the 32nd edition of the tournament and part of the 2016 ATP World Tour. It took place in Marrakesh, Morocco between 4 April and 10 April 2016. Fourth-seeded Federico Delbonis won the singles title.

== Finals ==
=== Singles ===
(Argentina) Federico Delbonis defeated (Croatia) Borna Ćorić, 6–2, 6–4

- It was Delbonis' only singles title of the year and the 2nd of his career.

=== Doubles ===
(Argentina) Guillermo Durán / (Argentina) Máximo González defeated (Croatia) Marin Draganja / (Pakistan) Aisam-ul-Haq Qureshi, 6–2, 3–6, [10–6]

== Singles main-draw entrants ==
=== Seeds ===
Country	Player	Rank^{1}	Seed
ESP	Guillermo García López	37	1
POR	João Sousa	38	2
CRO	Borna Ćorić	46	3
ARG	Federico Delbonis	48	4
RUS	Teymuraz Gabashvili	49	5
ESP	Albert Ramos Viñolas	50	6
ESP	Pablo Carreño Busta	53	7
CZE	Jiří Veselý	55	8

- ^{1} Rankings are as of March 21, 2016.

=== Other entrants ===
The following players received wildcards into the singles main draw:

- (Morocco) Amine Ahouda
- (Morocco) Reda El Amrani
- (Morocco) Lamine Ouahab

The following players received entry from the qualifying draw:

- (Italy) Lorenzo Giustino
- (Argentina) Máximo González
- (Croatia) Nikola Mektić
- (Croatia) Franko Škugor

=== Withdrawals ===
Before the tournament

- (Spain) Pablo Andújar →replaced by (Russia) Evgeny Donskoy
- (United Kingdom) Aljaž Bedene →replaced by (Japan) Taro Daniel
- (Latvia) Ernests Gulbis →replaced by (Argentina) Facundo Bagnis
- (Slovakia) Martin Kližan →replaced by (Spain) Daniel Gimeno Traver
- (Spain) Tommy Robredo →replaced by (Netherlands) Thiemo de Bakker

During the tournament

- (Italy) Simone Bolelli

== Doubles main-draw entrants ==
=== Seeds ===
Country	Player	Country	Player	Rank^{1}	Seed
GBR	Dominic Inglot	SWE	Robert Lindstedt	62	1
ESP	Marc López	ESP	David Marrero	62	2
CRO	Mate Pavić	NZL	Michael Venus	79	3
AUT	Oliver Marach	FRA	Fabrice Martin	91	4

- Rankings are as of March 21, 2016.

=== Other entrants ===
The following pairs received wildcards into the doubles main draw:

- (Morocco) Amine Ahouda / (Morocco) Yassine Idmbarek
- (Morocco) Reda El Amrani / (Morocco) Lamine Ouahab

=== Retirements ===
- (Morocco) Amine Ahouda
