= 2023 Uruguay Open =

- Date: 13–19 November
- Edition: 18th
- Surface: Clay
- Location: Montevideo, Uruguay
- Venue: Carrasco Lawn Tennis Club

Champions

Singles
- (Argentina) Facundo Díaz Acosta

Doubles
- (Argentina) Guido Andreozzi / (Argentina) Guillermo Durán
- Uruguay Open

The 2023 Uruguay Open was a professional tennis tournament played on red clay courts in Montevideo. It was the 18th edition of the tournament which was part of the 2023 ATP Challenger Tour. It took place at the Carrasco Lawn Tennis Club in Montevideo, Uruguay between 13 and 19 November 2023.

== Singles main-draw entrants ==
=== Seeds ===
Country	Player	Rank^{1}	Seed
ARG	Pedro Cachin	68	1
ARG	Federico Coria	88	2
CHI	Tomás Barrios Vera	105	3
ARG	Facundo Díaz Acosta	106	4
CHI	Alejandro Tabilo	109	5
BOL	Hugo Dellien	111	6
ARG	Thiago Agustín Tirante	119	7
ARG	Francisco Comesaña	122	8

- ^{1} Rankings are as of 6 November 2023.

=== Other entrants ===
The following players received wildcards into the singles main draw:

- (Uruguay) Joaquín Aguilar Cardozo
- (Uruguay) Ignacio Carou
- (Uruguay) Franco Roncadelli

The following players received entry from the qualifying draw:

- (Bolivia) Murkel Dellien
- (Ecuador) Álvaro Guillén Meza
- (Netherlands) Max Houkes
- (Brazil) Orlando Luz
- (Argentina) Santiago Rodríguez Taverna
- (Brazil) Pedro Sakamoto

The following player received entry as a lucky loser:

- (Argentina) Renzo Olivo

== Champions ==
=== Singles ===
- (Argentina) Facundo Díaz Acosta def. (Brazil) Thiago Monteiro 6–3, 4–3 ret.

=== Doubles ===
- (Argentina) Guido Andreozzi / (Argentina) Guillermo Durán def. (Bolivia) Boris Arias / (Bolivia) Federico Zeballos 2–6, 7–6^{(7–2)}, [10–8].
