= 2023 Uruguay Open – Doubles =

Doubles
- 2023 Uruguay Open

Final
- Champions: (Argentina) Guido Andreozzi (Argentina) Guillermo Durán
- Runners-up: (Bolivia) Boris Arias (Bolivia) Federico Zeballos
- Score: 2–6, 7–6^{(7–2)}, [10–8]

Events
Singles	Doubles
← 2022 ·	Uruguay Open	· 2024 →

Karol Drzewiecki and Piotr Matuszewski were the defending champions but chose not to defend their title.

Guido Andreozzi and Guillermo Durán won the title after defeating Boris Arias and Federico Zeballos 2–6, 7–6^{(7–2)}, [10–8] in the final.

== Seeds ==
1. (Argentina) Guido Andreozzi / (Argentina) Guillermo Durán (champions)
2. (Bolivia) Boris Arias / (Bolivia) Federico Zeballos (final)
3. (Brazil) Orlando Luz / (Mexico) Miguel Ángel Reyes-Varela (semifinals)
4. (Brazil) Fernando Romboli / (Brazil) Marcelo Zormann (semifinals)

== Draw ==
=== Key ===
- Q = Qualifier
- WC = Wild card
- LL = Lucky loser
- Alt = Alternate
- SE = Special exempt
- PR = Protected ranking
- ITF = ITF entry
- JE = Junior exempt
- w/o = Walkover
- r = Retired
- d = Defaulted
- SR = Special ranking

First round
1	(Argentina) G Andreozzi (Argentina) G Durán	w/o
(Italy) F Agamenone (Argentina) A Collarini
WC	(Argentina) P Cachin (Uruguay) M Cuevas
(Brazil) Gabriel Roveri Sidney (Australia) A Taylor	w/o
4	(Brazil) F Romboli (Brazil) M Zormann	w/o
(Portugal) G Elias (Brazil) F Meligeni Alves
(Switzerland) L Margaroli (Argentina) S Rodríguez Taverna	6^{3}	6	[9]
(Uruguay) I Carou (Argentina) C Ugo Carabelli	7^{7}	3	[11]
(Italy) Edoardo Lavagno (Monaco) V Vacherot
(Italy) A Giannessi (Spain) O Roca Batalla	w/o
(Argentina) R Olivo (New Zealand) R Statham	5	3
3	(Brazil) O Luz (Mexico) MÁ Reyes-Varela	7	6
WC	(Argentina) M Kestelboim (Uruguay) F Roncadelli	5	6	[10]
(Brazil) G Heide (Brazil) P Sakamoto	7	4	[7]
Alt	(Peru) I Buse (Paraguay) AD Vallejo	4	3
2	(Bolivia) B Arias (Bolivia) F Zeballos	6	6

Quarterfinals
1	(Argentina) G Andreozzi (Argentina) G Durán	6	6
(Brazil) G Roveri Sidney (Australia) A Taylor	3	4
4	(Brazil) F Romboli (Brazil) M Zormann	6^{7}	6	[10]
(Uruguay) I Carou (Argentina) C Ugo Carabelli	7^{9}	2	[6]
(Italy) A Giannessi (Spain) O Roca Batalla
3	(Brazil) O Luz (Mexico) MÁ Reyes-Varela	w/o
WC	(Argentina) M Kestelboim (Uruguay) F Roncadelli	4	7	[6]
2	(Bolivia) B Arias (Bolivia) F Zeballos	6	5	[10]

Semifinals
1	(Argentina) G Andreozzi (Argentina) G Durán	6	7^{8}
4	(Brazil) F Romboli (Brazil) M Zormann	4	6^{6}
3	(Brazil) O Luz (Mexico) MÁ Reyes-Varela	4	2
2	(Bolivia) B Arias (Bolivia) F Zeballos	6	6

Final
1	(Argentina) G Andreozzi (Argentina) G Durán	2	7^{7}	[10]
2	(Bolivia) B Arias (Bolivia) F Zeballos	6	6^{2}	[8]
