= 2014 Claro Open Cali – Doubles =

Doubles
- 2014 Claro Open Cali

Final
- Champions: (Argentina) Guido Andreozzi (Argentina) Guillermo Durán
- Runners-up: (Colombia) Alejandro González (Mexico) César Ramírez
- Score: 6–3, 6–4

Events
Singles	Doubles
- Claro Open Cali

This was the first edition of the event.

Guido Andreozzi and Guillermo Durán won the title, defeating Alejandro González and César Ramírez 6–3, 6–4 in the final.

== Seeds ==
1. (Colombia) Nicolás Barrientos / (Brazil) Marcelo Demoliner (first round)
2. (United States) Kevin King / (Colombia) Juan Carlos Spir (quarterfinals)
3. (Venezuela) Roberto Maytín / (Argentina) Andrés Molteni (first round)
4. (Argentina) Guido Pella / (Argentina) Horacio Zeballos (quarterfinals, withdrew)

== Draw ==
Key

- Q = Qualifier
- WC = Wild card
- LL = Lucky loser
- Alt = Alternate
- ITF = ITF entry
- PR = Protected ranking
- SR = Special ranking
- SE = Special exempt
- JE = Junior exempt
- JR = Junior Accelerator Programme entrant
- CO = College Accelerator Programme entrant
- NG = Next Gen Accelerator Program entrant
- w/o = Walkover
- r = Retired
- d = Defaulted

=== Draw ===
First round
1	(Colombia) N Barrientos (Brazil) M Demoliner	6^{4}	4
(Argentina) G Andreozzi (Argentina) G Durán	7^{7}	6
(Brazil) Wilson Leite (Brazil) J Souza	6	6
WC	(Ecuador) G Lapentti (Venezuela) LD Martinez	1	1
3	(Venezuela) R Maytín (Argentina) A Molteni	3	3
(Brazil) G Clezar (Argentina) A Collarini	6	6
WC	(Ecuador) E Gómez (Chile) N Jarry	6	7^{7}
(Croatia) T Androić (Croatia) N Mektić	4	6^{5}
(Colombia) A González (Mexico) C Ramírez	6	6
(Colombia) A Falla (Spain) D Muñoz de la Nava	4	3
(Argentina) M Alund (Argentina) F Bagnis	3	6	[4]
4	(Argentina) G Pella (Argentina) H Zeballos	6	3	[10]
(Italy) M Bortolotti (Italy) P Lorenzi	6	6
WC	(El Salvador) M Arévalo (Puerto Rico) A Llompart	4	2
(Peru) S Galdós (Colombia) E Struvay	5	7^{7}	[5]
2	(United States) K King (Colombia) JC Spir	7	6^{5}	[10]

Quarterfinals
(Argentina) G Andreozzi (Argentina) G Durán	6	6
(Brazil) W Leite (Brazil) J Souza	0	1
(Brazil) G Clezar (Argentina) A Collarini	6^{5}	4
WC	(Ecuador) E Gómez (Chile) N Jarry	7^{7}	6
(Colombia) A González (Mexico) C Ramírez	w/o
4	(Argentina) G Pella (Argentina) H Zeballos
(Italy) M Bortolotti (Italy) P Lorenzi	7^{7}	6
2	(United States) K King (Colombia) JC Spir	6^{5}	4

Semifinals
(Argentina) G Andreozzi (Argentina) G Durán	4	6	[11]
WC	(Ecuador) E Gómez (Chile) N Jarry	6	1	[9]
(Colombia) A González (Mexico) C Ramírez	6	6
(Italy) M Bortolotti (Italy) P Lorenzi	3	2

Final
(Argentina) G Andreozzi (Argentina) G Durán	6	6
(Colombia) A González (Mexico) C Ramírez	3	4
