= 2022 Challenger Coquimbo II =

- Date: 17–23 October 2022
- Edition: 2nd
- Surface: Clay
- Location: Coquimbo, Chile

Champions

Singles
- (Argentina) Juan Manuel Cerúndolo

Doubles
- (Italy) Franco Agamenone / (Argentina) Hernán Casanova
← 2022 ·	Challenger Coquimbo	· 2023 →

The 2022 Challenger Coquimbo II was a professional tennis tournament played on clay courts. It was part of the 2022 ATP Challenger Tour. It took place in Coquimbo, Chile between 17 and 23 October 2022.

== Singles main-draw entrants ==
=== Seeds ===
Country	Player	Rank^{1}	Seed
ARG	Federico Coria	72	1
ARG	Tomás Martín Etcheverry	89	2
GER	Daniel Altmaier	102	3
ITA	Marco Cecchinato	117	4
ARG	Camilo Ugo Carabelli	123	5
KAZ	Timofey Skatov	152	6
ARG	Juan Manuel Cerúndolo	155	7
ITA	Franco Agamenone	158	8

- Rankings are as of 10 October 2022.

=== Other entrants ===
The following players received wildcards into the singles main draw:

- (Chile) Diego Fernández Flores
- (Chile) Matías Soto
- (Paraguay) Daniel Vallejo

The following players received entry into the singles main draw as alternates:

- (Argentina) Román Andrés Burruchaga
- (Argentina) Juan Pablo Paz
- (Brazil) Thiago Seyboth Wild

The following players received entry from the qualifying draw:

- (Switzerland) Rémy Bertola
- (India) Sumit Nagal
- (Switzerland) Jakub Paul
- (Spain) Daniel Rincón
- (Argentina) Fermín Tenti
- (Spain) José Francisco Vidal Azorín

== Champions ==
=== Singles ===
- (Argentina) Juan Manuel Cerúndolo def. (Argentina) Facundo Díaz Acosta 6–3, 3–6, 6–4.

=== Doubles ===
- (Italy) Franco Agamenone / (Argentina) Hernán Casanova def. (Poland) Karol Drzewiecki / (Switzerland) Jakub Paul 6–3, 6–4.
