= 2014 Claro Open Cali =

- Date: 29 September – 4 October
- Edition: 1st
- Surface: Clay
- Location: Cali, Colombia

Champions

Singles
- (Italy) Paolo Lorenzi

Doubles
- (Argentina) Guido Andreozzi / (Argentina) Guillermo Durán
Claro Open Cali	· 2015 →

The 2014 Claro Open Cali was a professional tennis tournament played on clay courts. It was the first edition of the tournament which was part of the 2014 ATP Challenger Tour. It took place in Cali, Colombia between 29 September and 4 October 2014.

== Singles main-draw entrants ==
=== Seeds ===
Country	Player	Rank^{1}	Seed
COL	Alejandro Falla	73	1
ITA	Paolo Lorenzi	75	2
DOM	Víctor Estrella Burgos	81	3
ARG	Diego Sebastián Schwartzman	88	4
COL	Alejandro González	93	5
ARG	Horacio Zeballos	96	6
BRA	João Souza	101	7
ARG	Facundo Bagnis	122	8

- ^{1} Rankings are as of September 22, 2014.

=== Other entrants ===
The following players received wildcards into the singles main draw:

- (Colombia) Nicolás Barrientos
- (Colombia) Eduardo Struvay
- (United States) David Konstantinov
- (Dominican Republic) José Hernández

The following players received entry from the qualifying draw:

- (El Salvador) Marcelo Arévalo
- (Barbados) Darian King
- (Brazil) Wilson Leite
- (Brazil) Marcelo Demoliner

The following player received entry by a special exempt:

- (Argentina) Agustín Velotti

The following players received entry as an alternate:

- (Argentina) Andrés Molteni
- (Chile) Cristian Garín

== Champions ==
=== Singles ===
- (Italy) Paolo Lorenzi def. (Dominican Republic) Víctor Estrella Burgos, 4–6, 6–3, 6–3

=== Doubles ===
- (Argentina) Guido Andreozzi / (Argentina) Guillermo Durán def. (Colombia) Alejandro González / (Mexico) César Ramírez, 6–3, 6–4
