= 2022 Uruguay Open – Singles =

Singles
- 2022 Uruguay Open

Final
- Champion: (Argentina) Genaro Alberto Olivieri
- Runner-up: (Argentina) Tomás Martín Etcheverry
- Score: 6–7^{(3–7)}, 7–6^{(7–5)}, 6–3

Events
Singles	Doubles
← 2021 ·	Uruguay Open	· 2023 →

Hugo Dellien was the defending champion but chose not to defend his title.

Genaro Alberto Olivieri won the title after defeating Tomás Martín Etcheverry 6–7^{(3–7)}, 7–6^{(7–5)}, 6–3 in the final.

== Seeds ==
1. (Argentina) Federico Coria (withdrew)
2. (Argentina) Tomás Martín Etcheverry (final)
3. (Germany) Daniel Altmaier (semifinals)
4. (Argentina) Facundo Bagnis (quarterfinals)
5. (Italy) Marco Cecchinato (first round)
6. (Argentina) Camilo Ugo Carabelli (first round)
7. (Argentina) Juan Manuel Cerúndolo (second round, retired)
8. (Italy) Franco Agamenone (semifinals)

== Draw ==
=== Key ===
- Q = Qualifier
- WC = Wild card
- LL = Lucky loser
- Alt = Alternate
- SE = Special exempt
- PR = Protected ranking
- ITF = ITF entry
- JE = Junior exempt
- w/o = Walkover
- r = Retired
- d = Defaulted
- SR = Special ranking

=== Finals ===
Semifinals
Alt	(Argentina) Genaro Alberto Olivieri	2	6	6
8	(Italy) Franco Agamenone	6	4	4
3	(Germany) Daniel Altmaier	7^{7}	3	6^{6}
2	(Argentina) Tomás Martín Etcheverry	6^{5}	6	7^{8}

Final
Alt	(Argentina) Genaro Alberto Olivieri	6^{3}	7^{7}	6
2	(Argentina) Tomás Martín Etcheverry	7^{7}	6^{5}	3

=== Top half ===
First round
Q	(Brazil) E Ribeiro	7	0	2
(Portugal) G Elias	5	6	6
Q	(United Kingdom) J Choinski	5	5
Alt	(Argentina) GA Olivieri	7	7
Q	(Netherlands) M Houkes	7	6
WC	(Uruguay) F Roncadelli	5	2
(Argentina) M Trungelliti	6	6
5	(Italy) M Cecchinato	4	4
4	(Argentina) F Bagnis	7^{7}	6
Q	(Bolivia) F Zeballos	6^{5}	3
LL	(Argentina) G Villanueva	4	6^{9}
Q	(Argentina) JP Paz	6	7^{11}
(Argentina) F Comesaña	1	1
Q	(Tunisia) M Echargui	6	6
(Argentina) A Collarini	4	5
8	(Italy) F Agamenone	6	7

Second round
(Portugal) G Elias	5	3
Alt	(Argentina) GA Olivieri	7	6
Q	(Netherlands) M Houkes	6^{6}	2
(Argentina) M Trungelliti	7^{8}	6
4	(Argentina) F Bagnis	6^{5}	6	6
Q	(Argentina) JP Paz	7^{7}	1	0
Q	(Tunisia) M Echargui	5	3
8	(Italy) F Agamenone	7	6

Quarterfinals
Alt	(Argentina) GA Olivieri	6	6
(Argentina) M Trungelliti	1	4
4	(Argentina) F Bagnis	6	1	2
8	(Italy) F Agamenone	3	6	6

Semifinals
Alt	(Argentina) GA Olivieri	2	6	6
8	(Italy) F Agamenone	6	4	4

=== Bottom half ===
First round
6	(Argentina) C Ugo Carabelli	4	4
(Argentina) N Kicker	6	6
(Brazil) M Pucinelli de Almeida	7^{7}	6
(Argentina) S Rodríguez Taverna	6^{5}	3
(Brazil) F Meligeni Alves	6	6
PR	(India) S Nagal	4	3
(Argentina) JB Torres	2	2
3	(Germany) D Altmaier	6	6
7	(Argentina) JM Cerúndolo	7	6
WC	(Argentina) G Pella	5	3
(Argentina) H Casanova	3	1^{r}
(Argentina) F Díaz Acosta	6	4
WC	(Sweden) L Borg	5	1
(Argentina) M Navone	7	6
Alt	(Serbia) N Milojević	3	2
2	(Argentina) TM Etcheverry	6	6

Second round
(Argentina) N Kicker	4	6	6
(Brazil) M Pucinelli de Almeida	6	3	3
(Brazil) F Meligeni Alves	6^{5}	3
3	(Germany) D Altmaier	7^{7}	6
7	(Argentina) JM Cerúndolo	3	0^{r}
(Argentina) F Díaz Acosta	6	3
(Argentina) M Navone	4	1
2	(Argentina) TM Etcheverry	6	6

Quarterfinals
(Argentina) N Kicker	4	6	3
3	(Germany) D Altmaier	6	1	6
(Argentina) F Díaz Acosta	5	4
2	(Argentina) TM Etcheverry	7	6

Semifinals
3	(Germany) D Altmaier	7^{7}	3	6^{6}
2	(Argentina) TM Etcheverry	6^{5}	6	7^{8}
