= 2014 Aberto de Tênis do Rio Grande do Sul =

- Date: 22–28 September
- Edition: 3rd
- Surface: Clay
- Location: Porto Alegre, Brazil

Champions

Singles
- (Argentina) Carlos Berlocq

Doubles
- (Argentina) Guido Andreozzi / (Argentina) Guillermo Durán
← 2013 ·	Aberto de Tênis do Rio Grande do Sul	· 2015 →

The 2014 Aberto de Tênis do Rio Grande do Sul was a professional tennis tournament played on clay courts. It was the third edition of the tournament and was part of the 2014 ATP Challenger Tour. It took place in Porto Alegre, Brazil between 22 and 28 September 2014.

== Singles main-draw entrants ==
=== Seeds ===
Country	Player	Rank^{1}	Seed
ARG	Carlos Berlocq	67	1
ARG	Diego Sebastián Schwartzman	98	2
ARG	Facundo Bagnis	116	3
ARG	Facundo Argüello	117	4
POR	Gastão Elias	137	5
ARG	Guido Andreozzi	171	6
FRA	Axel Michon	181	7
BRA	Guilherme Clezar	191	8

- ^{1} Rankings are as of September 15, 2014.

=== Other entrants ===
The following players received wildcards into the singles main draw:

- (Brazil) Rafael Matos
- (Brazil) Fabrício Neis
- (Brazil) Eduardo Russi Assumpção
- (Brazil) Marcelo Zormann

The following players received entry from the qualifying draw:

- (Brazil) Daniel Dutra da Silva
- (Brazil) Tiago Lopes
- (Brazil) João Menezes
- (Brazil) Caio Zampieri

== Champions ==
=== Singles ===
- (Argentina) Carlos Berlocq def. (Argentina) Diego Schwartzman, 6–4, 4–6, 6–0

=== Doubles ===
- (Argentina) Guido Andreozzi / (Argentina) Guillermo Durán def. (Argentina) Facundo Bagnis / (Argentina) Diego Schwartzman, 6–3, 6–3
