= 2015 Aberto de Tênis do Rio Grande do Sul – Singles =

Singles
- 2015 Aberto de Tênis do Rio Grande do Sul

Final
- Champion: (Argentina) Guido Pella
- Runner-up: (Argentina) Diego Schwartzman
- Score: 6–3, 7–6^{(7–5)}

Events
Singles	Doubles
← 2014 ·	Aberto de Tênis do Rio Grande do Sul

Carlos Berlocq is the defending champion.

== Seeds ==
1. (Argentina) Diego Schwartzman (final)
2. (Argentina) Guido Pella (champion)
3. (Belgium) Kimmer Coppejans (second round)
4. (Argentina) Carlos Berlocq (semifinals)
5. (Argentina) Facundo Argüello (quarterfinals)
6. (Brazil) André Ghem (quarterfinals)
7. (Argentina) Facundo Bagnis (quarterfinals)
8. (Argentina) Máximo González (quarterfinals)

== Draw ==
=== Key ===
- Q = Qualifier
- WC = Wild card
- LL = Lucky loser
- Alt = Alternate
- SE = Special exempt
- PR = Protected ranking
- ITF = ITF entry
- JE = Junior exempt
- w/o = Walkover
- r = Retired
- d = Defaulted
- SR = Special ranking

=== Finals ===
Semifinals
1	(Argentina) Diego Schwartzman	3	6	7^{7}
4	(Argentina) Carlos Berlocq	6	3	6^{0}
(Brazil) Rogério Dutra Silva	1	7	1
2	(Argentina) Guido Pella	6	5	6

Final
1	(Argentina) Diego Schwartzman	3	6^{5}
2	(Argentina) Guido Pella	6	7^{7}

=== Top half ===
First round
1	(Argentina) D Schwartzman	6	6
WC	(Brazil) O Luz	4	2
(Sweden) C Lindell	7	6
Q	(Brazil) Alexandre Tsuchiya	5	2
(Argentina) R Olivo	4	7^{8}	6
Alt	(Brazil) CE Severino	6	6^{6}	3
(Brazil) J Pereira	3	7^{7}	4
8	(Argentina) M González	6	6^{3}	6
4	(Argentina) C Berlocq	3	7^{7}
(Argentina) G Andreozzi	6	6^{4}	r
WC	(Brazil) Thomas Ramos	0	0
(Portugal) FF Silva	6	6
(Chile) C Garin	4	2
Q	(Brazil) P Sakamoto	6	6
(Portugal) G Elias	6	5	4
7	(Argentina) F Bagnis	4	7	6

Second round
1	(Argentina) D Schwartzman	6	6
(Sweden) C Lindell	3	2
(Argentina) R Olivo	5	2
8	(Argentina) M González	7	6
4	(Argentina) C Berlocq	6	6^{4}	6
(Portugal) FF Silva	3	7^{7}	0
Q	(Brazil) P Sakamoto	3	4
7	(Argentina) F Bagnis	6	6

Quarterfinals
1	(Argentina) D Schwartzman	6	1	7
8	(Argentina) M González	1	6	5
4	(Argentina) C Berlocq	6	6
7	(Argentina) F Bagnis	4	3

Semifinals
1	(Argentina) D Schwartzman	3	6	7^{7}
4	(Argentina) C Berlocq	6	3	6^{0}

=== Bottom half ===
First round
5	(Argentina) F Argüello	6	6
WC	(Brazil) M Zormann	4	2
(France) A Michon	1	4
WC	(Brazil) T Monteiro	6	6
(Brazil) R Dutra Silva	6	6
Q	(Brazil) Oscar Jose Gutierrez	0	1
(Chile) JC Sáez	2	0
3	(Belgium) K Coppejans	6	6
6	(Brazil) A Ghem	6	6
(Brazil) C Zampieri	1	4
(Chile) H Podlipnik Castillo	6	4	4
(Dominican Republic) J Hernandez-Fernandez	2	6	6
(Argentina) N Kicker	6^{4}	2
(Bolivia) H Dellien	7^{7}	6
Q	(Argentina) A Velotti	3	4
2	(Argentina) G Pella	6	6

Second round
5	(Argentina) F Argüello	6	6
WC	(Brazil) T Monteiro	4	3
(Brazil) R Dutra Silva	6	6
3	(Belgium) K Coppejans	2	4
6	(Brazil) A Ghem	7^{7}	4	6
(Dominican Republic) J Hernandez-Fernandez	6^{1}	6	4
(Bolivia) H Dellien	1	4
2	(Argentina) G Pella	6	6

Quarterfinals
5	(Argentina) F Argüello	6	4	4
(Brazil) R Dutra Silva	2	6	6
6	(Brazil) A Ghem	4	5
2	(Argentina) G Pella	6	7

Semifinals
(Brazil) R Dutra Silva	1	7	1
2	(Argentina) G Pella	6	5	6
