= 2022 Challenger Coquimbo – Doubles =

Doubles
- 2022 Challenger Coquimbo

Final
- Champions: (Argentina) Guillermo Durán (Colombia) Nicolás Mejía
- Runners-up: (Ecuador) Diego Hidalgo (Colombia) Cristian Rodríguez
- Score: 6–4, 1–6, [10–7]

Events
Singles	Doubles
Challenger Coquimbo	· 2022 →

This was the first edition of the tournament.

Guillermo Durán and Nicolás Mejía won the title after defeating Diego Hidalgo and Cristian Rodríguez 6–4, 1–6, [10–7] in the final.

== Seeds ==
1. (Ecuador) Diego Hidalgo / (Colombia) Cristian Rodríguez (final)
2. (Brazil) Orlando Luz / (Venezuela) Luis David Martínez (first round)
3. (Argentina) Guillermo Durán / (Colombia) Nicolás Mejía (champions)
4. (Argentina) Hernán Casanova / (Argentina) Santiago Rodríguez Taverna (first round)

== Draw ==
=== Key ===
- Q = Qualifier
- WC = Wild card
- LL = Lucky loser
- Alt = Alternate
- SE = Special exempt
- PR = Protected ranking
- ITF = ITF entry
- JE = Junior exempt
- w/o = Walkover
- r = Retired
- d = Defaulted
- SR = Special ranking

First round
1	(Ecuador) D Hidalgo (Colombia) C Rodríguez	2	6	[10]
(Peru) N Álvarez (Argentina) F Comesaña	6	0	[6]
(Argentina) A Collarini (Argentina) Juan Ignacio Galarza	6	6
WC	(Chile) Guillermo Aracena (Chile) Sebastián Santibáñez	1	3
4	(Argentina) H Casanova (Argentina) S Rodríguez Taverna	7	0	[2]
(Bolivia) M Dellien (Peru) A Merino	5	6	[10]
(Bulgaria) A Andreev (Peru) J Panta	7	6^{6}	[11]
(Uruguay) I Carou (Argentina) GA Olivieri	5	7^{8}	[9]
(Argentina) AL Lingua Lavallén (Argentina) JB Torres	1	4
WC	(Argentina) Mateo Nicolás Martínez (Argentina) Juan Bautista Otegui	6	6
(Argentina) G Villanueva (Argentina) Matías Zukas	6	2	[3]
3	(Argentina) G Durán (Colombia) N Mejía	4	6	[10]
(Peru) A Huertas del Pino (Peru) C Huertas del Pino	5	6^{3}
(Argentina) RA Burruchaga (Argentina) F Díaz Acosta	7	7^{7}
(Argentina) MF Descotte (Slovenia) T Lipovšek Puches	6	6
2	(Brazil) O Luz (Venezuela) LD Martínez	3	2

Quarterfinals
1	(Ecuador) D Hidalgo (Colombia) C Rodríguez	6	6
(Argentina) A Collarini (Argentina) JI Galarza	1	1
(Bolivia) M Dellien (Peru) A Merino	6	6
(Bulgaria) A Andreev (Peru) J Panta	1	2
WC	(Argentina) MN Martínez (Argentina) JB Otegui	4	3
3	(Argentina) G Durán (Colombia) N Mejía	6	6
(Argentina) RA Burruchaga (Argentina) F Díaz Acosta	6	7
(Argentina) MF Descotte (Slovenia) T Lipovšek Puches	3	5

Semifinals
1	(Ecuador) D Hidalgo (Colombia) C Rodríguez	4	6	[10]
(Bolivia) M Dellien (Peru) A Merino	6	4	[3]
3	(Argentina) G Durán (Colombia) N Mejía	7^{7}	4	[10]
(Argentina) RA Burruchaga (Argentina) F Díaz Acosta	6^{1}	6	[4]

Final
1	(Ecuador) D Hidalgo (Colombia) C Rodríguez	4	6	[7]
3	(Argentina) G Durán (Colombia) N Mejía	6	1	[10]
