= 2013 Aberto de Tênis do Rio Grande do Sul =

Clay court tennis tournament in Brazil

- Date: 23–29 September
- Edition: 2nd
- Surface: Clay
- Location: Porto Alegre, Brazil

Champions

Singles
- (Argentina) Facundo Argüello

Doubles
- (Argentina) Guillermo Durán / (Argentina) Máximo González
← 2012 ·	Aberto de Tênis do Rio Grande do Sul	· 2014 →

The 2013 Aberto de Tênis do Rio Grande do Sul was a professional tennis tournament played on Clay. It was the Second edition of the tournament which was part of the 2013 ATP Challenger Tour. It took place in Porto Alegre, Brazil between 23 and 29 September 2013.

== Singles main draw entrants ==
=== Seeds ===
Country	Player	Rank^{1}	Seed
ARG	Guido Pella	100	1
SLO	Blaž Kavčič	105	2
NED	Thiemo de Bakker	109	3
ARG	Martín Alund	120	4
BRA	Rogério Dutra da Silva	127	5
POR	Gastão Elias	132	6
BRA	João Souza	140	7
CHI	Paul Capdeville	149	8

- ^{1} Rankings are as of September 16, 2013.

=== Other entrants ===
The following players received wildcards into the singles main draw:

- (Brazil) Marcelo Demoliner
- (Brazil) Eduardo Dischinger
- (Brazil) Thiago Monteiro
- (Brazil) Fabrício Neis

The following players used Protected Ranking to gain entry into the singles main draw:

- (Argentina) Eduardo Schwank

The following players used Special Exempt to gain entry into the singles main draw:

- (United States) Bjorn Fratangelo

The following players received entry from the qualifying draw:

- (Argentina) Andrea Collarini
- (Spain) Carlos Gómez-Herrera
- (Dominican Republic) José Hernández
- (Italy) Gianluigi Quinzi

== Champions ==
=== Singles ===
- (Argentina) Facundo Argüello def. (Argentina) Máximo González, 6–4, 6–1

=== Doubles ===
- (Argentina) Guillermo Durán / (Argentina) Máximo González def. (Dominican Republic) Víctor Estrella / (Brazil) João Souza, 3–6, 6–1, [10–5]
