= 2022 Challenger Coquimbo =

- Date: 9–14 May 2022
- Edition: 1st
- Surface: Clay
- Location: Coquimbo, Chile

Champions

Singles
- (Argentina) Facundo Díaz Acosta

Doubles
- (Argentina) Guillermo Durán / (Colombia) Nicolás Mejía
Challenger Coquimbo	· 2022 →

The 2022 Challenger Coquimbo was a professional tennis tournament played on clay courts. It was part of the 2022 ATP Challenger Tour. It took place in Coquimbo, Chile between 9 and 14 May 2022.

== Singles main-draw entrants ==
=== Seeds ===
Country	Player	Rank^{1}	Seed
CHI	Tomás Barrios Vera	145	1
ARG	Santiago Rodríguez Taverna	201	2
ARG	Andrea Collarini	227	3
ARG	Genaro Alberto Olivieri	241	4
CHI	Gonzalo Lama	259	5
BRA	Daniel Dutra da Silva	284	6
BRA	Orlando Luz	287	7
COL	Nicolás Mejía	291	8

- Rankings are as of 2 May 2022.

=== Other entrants ===
The following players received wildcards into the singles main draw:

- (Brazil) Pedro Boscardin Dias
- (Argentina) Santiago Rodríguez Taverna
- (Chile) Nicolás Villalón

The following players received entry into the singles main draw as alternates:

- (Argentina) Román Andrés Burruchaga
- (Argentina) Matías Franco Descotte

The following players received entry from the qualifying draw:

- (Bolivia) Murkel Dellien
- (Peru) Arklon Huertas del Pino
- (Peru) Conner Huertas del Pino
- (Brazil) Wilson Leite
- (Japan) Naoki Nakagawa
- (Brazil) João Lucas Reis da Silva

== Champions ==
=== Singles ===
- (Argentina) Facundo Díaz Acosta def. (Brazil) Pedro Boscardin Dias 7–5, 7–6^{(7–4)}.

=== Doubles ===
- (Argentina) Guillermo Durán / (Colombia) Nicolás Mejía def. (Ecuador) Diego Hidalgo / (Colombia) Cristian Rodríguez 6–4, 1–6, [10–7].
