= 2014 Claro Open Cali – Singles =

Singles
- 2014 Claro Open Cali

Final
- Champion: (Italy) Paolo Lorenzi
- Runner-up: (Dominican Republic) Víctor Estrella Burgos
- Score: 4–6, 6–3, 6–3

Events
| Singles | Doubles |
- Claro Open Cali

Paolo Lorenzi won the title, defeating Víctor Estrella Burgos 4–6, 6–3, 6–3 in the final.

== Seeds ==
1. (Colombia) Alejandro Falla (first round)
2. (Italy) Paolo Lorenzi (champion)
3. (Dominican Republic) Víctor Estrella Burgos (final)
4. (Argentina) Diego Sebastián Schwartzman (first round)
5. (Colombia) Alejandro González (quarterfinals)
6. (Argentina) Horacio Zeballos (second round)
7. (Brazil) João Souza (semifinals)
8. (Argentina) Facundo Bagnis (quarterfinals)

== Draw ==
Key

- Q = Qualifier
- WC = Wild card
- LL = Lucky loser
- Alt = Alternate
- ITF = ITF entry
- PR = Protected ranking
- SR = Special ranking
- SE = Special exempt
- JE = Junior exempt
- JR = Junior Accelerator Programme entrant
- CO = College Accelerator Programme entrant
- NG = Next Gen Accelerator Program entrant
- w/o = Walkover
- r = Retired
- d = Defaulted

=== Finals ===
Semifinals
(Argentina) Guido Andreozzi | 6 | 6^{3} | 0
3 | (Dominican Republic) Víctor Estrella Burgos | 3 | 7^{7} | 6
7 | (Brazil) João Souza | 6^{4} | 3
2 | (Italy) Paolo Lorenzi | 7^{7} | 6

Final
3 | (Dominican Republic) Víctor Estrella Burgos | 6 | 3 | 3
2 | (Italy) Paolo Lorenzi | 4 | 6 | 6

=== Top half ===
First round
1 | (Colombia) A Falla | 2 | 2
Q | (El Salvador) M Arévalo | 6 | 6
(Spain) D Muñoz de la Nava | 1 | 4
(Argentina) G Andreozzi | 6 | 6
(Ecuador) G Lapentti | 7^{7} | 4 | 1
WC | (Colombia) N Barrientos | 6^{2} | 6 | 6
WC | (Colombia) E Struvay | 6^{2} | 4
8 | (Argentina) F Bagnis | 7^{7} | 6
3 | (Dominican Republic) V Estrella Burgos | 6 | 6
WC | (United States) David Konstantinov | 3 | 4
Alt | (Argentina) A Molteni | 6 | 5 | 6^{7}
(Chile) G Lama | 3 | 7 | 7^{9}
(Croatia) T Androić | 2 | 1
(Chile) N Jarry | 6 | 6
WC | (Dominican Republic) J Hernández | 3 | 6^{5}
6 | (Argentina) H Zeballos | 6 | 7^{7}

Second round
Q | (El Salvador) M Arévalo | 3 | 4
(Argentina) G Andreozzi | 6 | 6
WC | (Colombia) N Barrientos | 0 | 5
8 | (Argentina) F Bagnis | 6 | 7
3 | (Dominican Republic) V Estrella Burgos | 6 | 5 | 6
(Chile) G Lama | 3 | 7 | 2
(Chile) N Jarry | 3 | 6 | 6
6 | (Argentina) H Zeballos | 6 | 3 | 4

Quarterfinals
(Argentina) G Andreozzi | 6 | 6
8 | (Argentina) F Bagnis | 3 | 2
3 | (Dominican Republic) V Estrella Burgos | 7^{8} | 6
(Chile) N Jarry | 6^{6} | 3

Semifinals
(Argentina) G Andreozzi | 6 | 6^{3} | 0
3 | (Dominican Republic) V Estrella Burgos | 3 | 7^{7} | 6

=== Bottom half ===
First round
7 | (Brazil) J Souza | 6 | 6
Alt | (Chile) C Garin | 3 | 3
Q | (Brazil) M Demoliner | 1 | 7 | 1
(Ecuador) E Gómez | 6 | 5 | 6
(Argentina) M Alund | 6 | 6
(Argentina) G Pella | 1 | 3
(Sweden) C Lindell | 6^{5} | 6 | 6
4 | (Argentina) D Schwartzman | 7^{7} | 4 | 4
5 | (Colombia) A González | 6^{5} | 6 | 6
Q | (Brazil) Wilson Leite | 7^{7} | 4 | 1
SE | (Argentina) A Velotti | 2 | 2
(Brazil) G Clezar | 6 | 6
(Argentina) A Collarini | 6 | 3 | 2^{r}
Q | (Barbados) D King | 2 | 6 | 5
(Croatia) N Mektić | 2 | 1
2 | (Italy) P Lorenzi | 6 | 6

Second round
7 | (Brazil) J Souza | 6 | 6
(Ecuador) E Gómez | 4 | 3
(Argentina) M Alund | 6^{2} | 6 | 3
(Sweden) C Lindell | 7^{7} | 4 | 6
5 | (Colombia) A González | 4 | 6 | 6
(Brazil) G Clezar | 6 | 3 | 1
Q | (Barbados) D King | 0 | 2
2 | (Italy) P Lorenzi | 6 | 6

Quarterfinals
7 | (Brazil) J Souza | 6 | 6
(Sweden) C Lindell | 2 | 2
5 | (Colombia) A González | 4 | 6^{5}
2 | (Italy) P Lorenzi | 6 | 7^{7}

Semifinals
7 | (Brazil) J Souza | 6^{4} | 3
2 | (Italy) P Lorenzi | 7^{7} | 6
