= 2023 Challenger Coquimbo – Doubles =

Doubles
- 2023 Challenger Coquimbo

Final
- Champions: (Argentina) Valerio Aboian (Bolivia) Murkel Dellien
- Runners-up: (Argentina) Tomás Farjat (Italy) Facundo Juárez
- Score: 7–6^{(7–4)}, 6–0

Events
Singles	Doubles
- Challenger Coquimbo

Franco Agamenone and Hernán Casanova were the defending champions but only Casanova chose to defend his title, partnering Santiago Rodríguez Taverna. Casanova withdrew before his first round match.

Valerio Aboian and Murkel Dellien won the title after defeating Tomás Farjat and Facundo Juárez 7–6^{(7–4)}, 6–0 in the final.

== Seeds ==
1. (Argentina) Hernán Casanova / (Argentina) Santiago Rodríguez Taverna (withdrew)
2. (Peru) Arklon Huertas del Pino / (Peru) Conner Huertas del Pino (semifinals)
3. (Argentina) Leonardo Aboian / (Argentina) Ignacio Monzón (first round, withdrew)
4. (Argentina) Román Andrés Burruchaga / (Argentina) Juan Bautista Torres (withdrew)

== Draw ==
Key

- Q = Qualifier
- WC = Wild card
- LL = Lucky loser
- Alt = Alternate
- ITF = ITF entry
- PR = Protected ranking
- SR = Special ranking
- SE = Special exempt
- JE = Junior exempt
- JR = Junior Accelerator Programme entrant
- CO = College Accelerator Programme entrant
- NG = Next Gen Accelerator Program entrant
- w/o = Walkover
- r = Retired
- d = Defaulted

First round
Alt	(Argentina) Thiago Cigarrán (Argentina) S de la Fuente	6	4	[8]
(Argentina) Tomás Farjat (Italy) Facundo Juárez	2	6	[10]
(Brazil) Wilson Leite (Brazil) J Pereira	6	2	[10]
(Peru) J Panta (Argentina) G Villanueva	4	6	[8]
WC	(Chile) Jaime Prohens Muñoz (Chile) Guillermo Rojas Pedrón	0	0
(Dominican Republic) N Hardt (Japan) N Nakagawa	6	6
(Brazil) M Alves (Brazil) G Heide	4	6^{4}
(Argentina) V Aboian (Bolivia) M Dellien	6	7^{7}
(Chile) G Lama (Brazil) JVC Loureiro	w/o
3	(Argentina) Leonardo Aboian (Argentina) Ignacio Monzón
(Brazil) P Boscardin Dias (Brazil) JL Reis da Silva	7	3	[10]
WC	(Chile) Ignacio Becerra (Chile) Daniel Antonio Núñez	5	6	[7]
(Brazil) D Dutra da Silva (Brazil) E Ribeiro	2	4
2	(Peru) A Huertas del Pino (Peru) C Huertas del Pino	6	6

Quarterfinals
(Argentina) T Farjat (Italy) F Juárez	3	7^{7}	[10]
(Brazil) W Leite (Brazil) J Pereira	6	6^{3}	[5]
(Uruguay) I Carou (Argentina) F Comesaña
(Dominican Republic) N Hardt (Japan) N Nakagawa	w/o
(Argentina) V Aboian (Bolivia) M Dellien	3	6	[10]
(Chile) G Lama (Brazil) JVC Loureiro	6	3	[3]
(Brazil) P Boscardin Dias (Brazil) JL Reis da Silva
2	(Peru) A Huertas del Pino (Peru) C Huertas del Pino	w/o

Semifinals
(Argentina) T Farjat (Italy) F Juárez	6	6
(Dominican Republic) N Hardt (Japan) N Nakagawa	4	3
(Argentina) V Aboian (Bolivia) M Dellien	5	6	[10]
2	(Peru) A Huertas del Pino (Peru) C Huertas del Pino	7	3	[7]

Final
(Argentina) T Farjat (Italy) F Juárez	6^{4}	0
(Argentina) V Aboian (Bolivia) M Dellien	7^{7}	6
