= 2022 Uruguay Open =

- Date: 7–13 November
- Edition: 17th
- Category: ATP Challenger 80
- Surface: Clay
- Location: Montevideo, Uruguay
- Venue: Carrasco Lawn Tennis Club

Champions

Singles
- (Argentina) Genaro Alberto Olivieri

Doubles
- (Poland) Karol Drzewiecki / (Poland) Piotr Matuszewski
- Uruguay Open

The 2022 Uruguay Open was a professional tennis tournament played on red clay courts in Montevideo. It was the 17th edition of the tournament which was part of the 2022 ATP Challenger Tour. It took place at the Carrasco Lawn Tennis Club in Montevideo, Uruguay between 7 and 13 November 2022.

== Singles main-draw entrants ==
=== Seeds ===
Country	Player	Rank^{1}	Seed
~~ARG~~	~~Federico Coria~~	~~71~~	~~1~~
ARG	Tomás Martín Etcheverry	83	2
GER	Daniel Altmaier	91	3
ARG	Facundo Bagnis	101	4
ITA	Marco Cecchinato	109	5
ARG	Camilo Ugo Carabelli	123	6
ARG	Juan Manuel Cerúndolo	151	7
ITA	Franco Agamenone	154	8

- ^{1} Rankings are as of 31 October 2022.

=== Other entrants ===
The following players received wildcards into the singles main draw:

- (Sweden) Leo Borg
- (Argentina) Guido Pella
- (Uruguay) Franco Roncadelli

The following player received entry into the singles main draw using a protected ranking:

- (India) Sumit Nagal

The following players received entry into the singles main draw as alternates:

- (Serbia) Nikola Milojević
- (Argentina) Genaro Alberto Olivieri

The following players received entry from the qualifying draw:

- (United Kingdom) Jan Choinski
- (Tunisia) Moez Echargui
- (Netherlands) Max Houkes
- (Argentina) Juan Pablo Paz
- (Brazil) Eduardo Ribeiro
- (Bolivia) Federico Zeballos

The following player received entry as a lucky loser:

- (Argentina) Gonzalo Villanueva

== Champions ==
=== Singles ===
- (Argentina) Genaro Alberto Olivieri def. (Argentina) Tomás Martín Etcheverry 6–7^{(3–7)}, 7–6^{(7–5)}, 6–3.

=== Doubles ===
- (Poland) Karol Drzewiecki / (Poland) Piotr Matuszewski def. (Argentina) Facundo Díaz Acosta / (Venezuela) Luis David Martínez 6–4, 6–4.
