= 2023 Challenger Coquimbo – Singles =

Singles
- 2023 Challenger Coquimbo

Final
- Champion: (Brazil) Matheus Pucinelli de Almeida
- Runner-up: (Brazil) João Lucas Reis da Silva
- Score: 7–6^{(7–1)}, 6–7^{(4–7)}, 6–4

Events
Singles	Doubles
- Challenger Coquimbo

Juan Manuel Cerúndolo was the defending champion but chose not to defend his title.

Matheus Pucinelli de Almeida won the title after defeating João Lucas Reis da Silva 7–6^{(7–1)}, 6–7^{(4–7)}, 6–4 in the final.

== Seeds ==
1. (Dominican Republic) Nick Hardt (quarterfinals)
2. (Brazil) Thiago Seyboth Wild (semifinals)
3. (Argentina) Santiago Rodríguez Taverna (quarterfinals)
4. (Argentina) Francisco Comesaña (second round)
5. (Argentina) Hernán Casanova (first round)
6. (Argentina) Juan Bautista Torres (first round)
7. (Argentina) Román Andrés Burruchaga (semifinals)
8. (Brazil) João Lucas Reis da Silva (final)

== Draw ==
Key

- Q = Qualifier
- WC = Wild card
- LL = Lucky loser
- Alt = Alternate
- ITF = ITF entry
- PR = Protected ranking
- SR = Special ranking
- SE = Special exempt
- JE = Junior exempt
- JR = Junior Accelerator Programme entrant
- CO = College Accelerator Programme entrant
- NG = Next Gen Accelerator Program entrant
- w/o = Walkover
- r = Retired
- d = Defaulted

=== Finals ===
Semifinals
8	(Brazil) João Lucas Reis da Silva	6	6
7	(Argentina) Román Andrés Burruchaga	2	4
(Brazil) Matheus Pucinelli de Almeida	7^{10}	7
2/WC	(Brazil) Thiago Seyboth Wild	6^{8}	5

Final
8	(Brazil) João Lucas Reis da Silva	6^{1}	7^{7}	4
(Brazil) Matheus Pucinelli de Almeida	7^{7}	6^{4}	6

=== Top half ===
First round
1	(Dominican Republic) N Hardt	6	6
(Argentina) L Midón	4	3
Q	(Argentina) S de la Fuente	2	3
(Brazil) J Pereira	6	6
(Japan) N Nakagawa	6	5	3
(Brazil) P Boscardin Dias	4	7	6
(Brazil) E Ribeiro	2	3
8	(Brazil) JL Reis da Silva	6	6
3	(Argentina) S Rodríguez Taverna	6	6
(Argentina) V Aboian	4	4
Q	(Peru) A Huertas del Pino	6	6
WC	(Chile) Nicolás Villalón	4	1
(Bolivia) M Dellien	6	6
(Argentina) G Villanueva	3	4
(Brazil) Wilson Leite	3	3
7	(Argentina) RA Burruchaga	6	6

Second round
1	(Dominican Republic) N Hardt	7	6
(Brazil) J Pereira	5	2
(Brazil) P Boscardin Dias	2	2
8	(Brazil) JL Reis da Silva	6	6
3	(Argentina) S Rodríguez Taverna	6	3	6
Q	(Peru) A Huertas del Pino	4	6	4
(Bolivia) M Dellien	2	2
7	(Argentina) RA Burruchaga	6	6

Quarterfinals
1	(Dominican Republic) N Hardt	3	7^{7}	1
8	(Brazil) JL Reis da Silva	6	6^{5}	6
3	(Argentina) S Rodríguez Taverna	5	1
7	(Argentina) RA Burruchaga	7	6

Semifinals
8	(Brazil) JL Reis da Silva	6	6
7	(Argentina) RA Burruchaga	2	4

=== Bottom half ===
First round
6	(Argentina) JB Torres	1	5
(Brazil) G Heide	6	7
(Italy) Facundo Juárez	6	6
(Peru) J Panta	0	2
(Chile) G Lama	1	2
(Brazil) M Pucinelli de Almeida	6	6
Alt	(Argentina) Leonardo Aboian	2	6	4
4	(Argentina) F Comesaña	6	4	6
5	(Argentina) H Casanova	3	1
Q	(Brazil) M Alves	6	6
Q	(Peru) C Huertas del Pino	6	6
WC	(Chile) Daniel Antonio Núñez	4	4
Q	(Argentina) A Barrena	6	7^{8}
Q	(Argentina) Ignacio Monzón	4	6^{6}
(Brazil) D Dutra da Silva	1	2
2/WC	(Brazil) T Seyboth Wild	6	6

Second round
(Brazil) G Heide	5	3
(Italy) F Juárez	7	6
(Brazil) M Pucinelli de Almeida	6	7^{7}
4	(Argentina) F Comesaña	2	6^{3}
Q	(Brazil) M Alves	6	3	6
Q	(Peru) C Huertas del Pino	1	6	3
Q	(Argentina) A Barrena	2	0
2/WC	(Brazil) T Seyboth Wild	6	6

Quarterfinals
(Italy) F Juárez	3	4
(Brazil) M Pucinelli de Almeida	6	6
Q	(Brazil) M Alves	1	2
2/WC	(Brazil) T Seyboth Wild	6	6

Semifinals
(Brazil) M Pucinelli de Almeida	7^{10}	7
2/WC	(Brazil) T Seyboth Wild	6^{8}	5
