= 2012 Aberto de Tênis do Rio Grande do Sul =

- Date: 22–28 October
- Edition: 1st
- Surface: Clay
- Location: Porto Alegre, Brazil

Champions

Singles
- (Germany) Simon Greul

Doubles
- (Brazil) Marcelo Demoliner / (Brazil) João Souza
Aberto de Tênis do Rio Grande do Sul	· 2013 →

The 2012 Aberto de Tênis do Rio Grande do Sul was a professional tennis tournament played on clay courts. It was the first edition of the tournament which was part of the 2012 ATP Challenger Tour. It took place in Porto Alegre, Brazil between 22 and 28 October 2012.

== Singles main draw entrants ==
=== Seeds ===
Country	Player	Rank^{1}	Seed
ESP	Rubén Ramírez Hidalgo	91	1
AUT	Andreas Haider-Maurer	98	2
POR	João Sousa	99	3
ROU	Adrian Ungur	118	4
ARG	Guido Pella	126	5
BRA	Thiago Alves	129	6
NED	Thiemo de Bakker	132	7
BRA	João Souza	133	8

- ^{1} Rankings are as of October 15, 2012.

=== Other entrants ===
The following players received wildcards into the singles main draw:

- (Brazil) Marcelo Demoliner
- (Brazil) Gabriel Friedrich
- (Brazil) Fabricio Neis
- (Brazil) José Pereira

The following players received entry from the qualifying draw:

- (Belgium) Arthur De Greef
- (Brazil) André Ghem
- (Colombia) Alejandro González
- (Chile) Hans Podlipnik

== Champions ==
=== Singles ===
- (Germany) Simon Greul def. (Portugal) Gastão Elias, 2–6, 7–6^{(7–5)}, 7–5

=== Doubles ===
- (Brazil) Marcelo Demoliner / (Brazil) João Souza def. (Germany) Simon Greul / (Italy) Alessandro Motti, 6–3, 3–6, [10–7]
