= 2012 Aberto de Tênis do Rio Grande do Sul – Singles =

Singles
- 2012 Aberto de Tênis do Rio Grande do Sul

Final
- Champion: (Germany) Simon Greul
- Runner-up: (Portugal) Gastão Elias
- Score: 2–6, 7–6^{(7–5)}, 7–5

Events
Singles	Doubles
- Aberto de Tênis do Rio Grande do Sul

Simon Greul defeated Gastão Elias 2–6, 7–6^{(7–5)}, 7–5 in the final to win the title.

== Seeds ==
1. (Spain) Rubén Ramírez Hidalgo (semifinals)
2. (Austria) Andreas Haider-Maurer (first round)
3. (Portugal) João Sousa (first round)
4. (Romania) Adrian Ungur (first round)
5. (Argentina) Guido Pella (second round)
6. (Brazil) Thiago Alves (quarterfinals)
7. (Netherlands) Thiemo de Bakker (second round)
8. (Brazil) João Souza (first round)

== Draw ==
Key

- Q = Qualifier
- WC = Wild card
- LL = Lucky loser
- Alt = Alternate
- ITF = ITF entry
- PR = Protected ranking
- SR = Special ranking
- SE = Special exempt
- JE = Junior exempt
- JR = Junior Accelerator Programme entrant
- CO = College Accelerator Programme entrant
- NG = Next Gen Accelerator Program entrant
- w/o = Walkover
- r = Retired
- d = Defaulted

=== Finals ===
Semifinals
1	(Spain) Rubén Ramírez Hidalgo	6	1	2
(Portugal) Gastão Elias	1	6	6
(Netherlands) Thomas Schoorel	5	6	4
(Germany) Simon Greul	7	2	6

Final
(Portugal) Gastão Elias	6	6^{5}	5
(Germany) Simon Greul	2	7^{7}	7

=== Top half ===
First round
1	(Spain) R Ramírez Hidalgo	6	6
(Brazil) R Hocevar	4	2
WC	(Brazil) Gabriel Friedrich	4	2
WC	(Brazil) M Demoliner	6	6
(Colombia) C Salamanca	6^{12}	3
Q	(Colombia) A González	7^{14}	6
(Croatia) N Mektić	3	5
6	(Brazil) T Alves	6	7
3	(Portugal) J Sousa	4	3
(United States) W Odesnik	6	6
PR	(Germany) J Reister	6	6
(Brazil) F de Paula	3	4
(Portugal) G Elias	6	6
Q	(Belgium) A De Greef	2	1
WC	(Brazil) F Neis	2	4
7	(Netherlands) T de Bakker	6	6

Second round
1	(Spain) R Ramírez Hidalgo	6	4	7
WC	(Brazil) M Demoliner	4	6	5
Q	(Colombia) A González	6^{6}	6^{6}
6	(Brazil) T Alves	7^{8}	7^{8}
(United States) W Odesnik	6	6
PR	(Germany) J Reister	4	4
(Portugal) G Elias	7^{8}	2	6
7	(Netherlands) T de Bakker	6^{6}	6	2

Quarterfinals
1	(Spain) R Ramírez Hidalgo	4	7	6
6	(Brazil) T Alves	6	5	4
(United States) W Odesnik	4	5
(Portugal) G Elias	6	7

Semifinals
1	(Spain) R Ramírez Hidalgo	6	1	2
(Portugal) G Elias	1	6	6

=== Bottom half ===
First round
8	(Brazil) J Souza	3	6	3
(Serbia) B Pašanski	6	3	6
(Brazil) L Kirche	7^{7}	6
Q	(Brazil) A Ghem	6^{3}	4
(Netherlands) T Schoorel	6	1	6
(Slovakia) P Červenák	4	6	4
(Brazil) G Clezar	6	6
4	(Romania) A Ungur	4	2
5	(Argentina) G Pella	6	6^{2}	7
(Portugal) P Sousa	2	7^{7}	5
(Germany) S Greul	6	6
(Croatia) A Veić	0	2
WC	(Brazil) J Pereira	6	5	4
Q	(Chile) H Podlipnik	4	7	6
(Brazil) J Silva	1	6	7^{7}
2	(Austria) A Haider-Maurer	6	3	6^{1}

Second round
(Serbia) B Pašanski	2	4
(Brazil) L Kirche	6	6
(Netherlands) T Schoorel	7^{7}	6
(Brazil) G Clezar	6^{3}	2
5	(Argentina) G Pella	5	1
(Germany) S Greul	7	6
Q	(Chile) H Podlipnik	7^{7}	2	4
(Brazil) J Silva	6^{4}	6	6

Quarterfinals
(Brazil) L Kirche	4	7	3
(Netherlands) T Schoorel	6	5	6
(Germany) S Greul	6	6
(Brazil) J Silva	2	3

Semifinals
(Netherlands) T Schoorel	5	6	4
(Germany) S Greul	7	2	6
