= 2016 Grand Prix Hassan II – Doubles =

Doubles
- 2016 Grand Prix Hassan II

Final
- Champions: (Argentina) Guillermo Durán (Argentina) Máximo González
- Runners-up: (Croatia) Marin Draganja (Pakistan) Aisam-ul-Haq Qureshi
- Score: 6–2, 3–6, [10–6]

Events
Singles	Doubles
- Grand Prix Hassan II

Rameez Junaid and Adil Shamasdin were the defending champions, but chose not to compete this year.
Guillermo Durán and Máximo González won the title, defeating Marin Draganja and Aisam-ul-Haq Qureshi in the final, 6–2, 3–6, [10–6].

== Seeds ==
1. (United Kingdom) Dominic Inglot / (Sweden) Robert Lindstedt (quarterfinals)
2. (Spain) Marc López / (Spain) David Marrero (quarterfinals)
3. (Croatia) Mate Pavić / (New Zealand) Michael Venus (semifinals)
4. (Austria) Oliver Marach / (France) Fabrice Martin (first round)

== Draw ==
Key

- Q = Qualifier
- WC = Wild card
- LL = Lucky loser
- Alt = Alternate
- ITF = ITF entry
- PR = Protected ranking
- SR = Special ranking
- SE = Special exempt
- JE = Junior exempt
- JR = Junior Accelerator Programme entrant
- CO = College Accelerator Programme entrant
- NG = Next Gen Accelerator Program entrant
- w/o = Walkover
- r = Retired
- d = Defaulted

=== Draw ===
First round
1	(United Kingdom) D Inglot (Sweden) R Lindstedt	6	6
WC	(Morocco) R El Amrani (Morocco) L Ouahab	2	4
(Croatia) M Draganja (Pakistan) A-u-H Qureshi	4	6	[10]
(Israel) J Erlich (United Kingdom) C Fleming	6	4	[6]
4	(Austria) O Marach (France) F Martin	4	2
(India) R Bopanna (Uzbekistan) D Istomin	6	6
(Spain) N Almagro (Spain) G García-López	7^{7}	3	[6]
(Spain) P Carreño Busta (Spain) Í Cervantes	6^{5}	6	[10]
(Netherlands) W Koolhof (Netherlands) M Middelkoop	7^{7}	6^{3}	[14]
(Spain) A Ramos-Viñolas (Czech Republic) J Veselý	6^{5}	7^{7}	[16]
(Argentina) F Bagnis (Argentina) F Delbonis	6^{7}	2
3	(Croatia) M Pavić (New Zealand) M Venus	7^{9}	6
(Argentina) G Durán (Argentina) M González	6	7^{9}
(Russia) T Gabashvili (United Kingdom) J Marray	4	6^{7}
WC	(Morocco) A Ahouda (Morocco) Y Idmbarek	0	0^{r}
2	(Spain) M López (Spain) D Marrero	6	0

Quarterfinals
1	(United Kingdom) D Inglot (Sweden) R Lindstedt	3	6^{2}
(Croatia) M Draganja (Pakistan) A-u-H Qureshi	6	7^{7}
(India) R Bopanna (Uzbekistan) D Istomin	6	7^{7}
(Spain) P Carreño Busta (Spain) Í Cervantes	3	6^{5}
(Spain) A Ramos-Viñolas (Czech Republic) J Veselý	4	3
3	(Croatia) M Pavić (New Zealand) M Venus	6	6
(Argentina) G Durán (Argentina) M González	6	6
2	(Spain) M López (Spain) D Marrero	4	4

Semifinals
(Croatia) M Draganja (Pakistan) A-u-H Qureshi	7^{7}	7^{7}
(India) R Bopanna (Uzbekistan) D Istomin	6^{5}	6^{5}
3	(Croatia) M Pavić (New Zealand) M Venus	7	4	[7]
(Argentina) G Durán (Argentina) M González	5	6	[10]

Final
(Croatia) M Draganja (Pakistan) A-u-H Qureshi	2	6	[6]
(Argentina) G Durán (Argentina) M González	6	3	[10]
