= 2015 Aberto de Tênis do Rio Grande do Sul =

- Date: 28 September – 4 October
- Edition: 4th
- Surface: Clay
- Location: Porto Alegre, Brazil

Champions

Singles
- (Argentina) Guido Pella

Doubles
- (Portugal) Gastão Elias (Portugal) Frederico Ferreira Silva
| ← 2014 · | Aberto de Tênis do Rio Grande do Sul |

The 2015 Aberto de Tênis do Rio Grande do Sul was a professional tennis tournament played on clay courts. It was the fourth edition of the tournament which was part of the 2015 ATP Challenger Tour. It took place in Porto Alegre, Brazil between 28 September and 4 October 2015.

== Singles main-draw entrants ==
=== Seeds ===
| Country | Player | Rank^{1} | Seed |
|---|---|---|---|
| ARG | Diego Schwartzman | 80 | 1 |
| ARG | Guido Pella | 95 | 2 |
| BEL | Kimmer Coppejans | 132 | 3 |
| ARG | Carlos Berlocq | 138 | 4 |
| POR | Facundo Argüello | 146 | 5 |
| BRA | André Ghem | 149 | 6 |
| ARG | Facundo Bagnis | 152 | 7 |
| ARG | Máximo González | 157 | 8 |

- ^{1} Rankings are as of September 21, 2015.

=== Other entrants ===
The following players received wildcards into the singles main draw:

- (Brazil) Marcelo Zormann
- (Brazil) Orlando Luz
- (Brazil) Thiago Monteiro
- (Brazil) Thomas Ramos

The following player received entry into the singles main draw as an alternate:

- (Brazil) Carlos Eduardo Severino

The following players received entry from the qualifying draw:

- (Argentina) Agustín Velotti
- (Brazil) Alexandre Tsuchiya
- (Brazil) Oscar Jose Gutierrez
- (Brazil) Pedro Sakamoto

== Champions ==
=== Singles ===
- (Argentina) Guido Pella def. (Argentina) Diego Schwartzman, 6–3, 7–6^{(7–5)}

=== Doubles ===
- (Portugal) Gastão Elias / (Portugal) Frederico Ferreira Silva def. (Chile) Cristian Garín / (Chile) Juan Carlos Sáez, 6–2, 6–4
