= 2022 Challenger Coquimbo – Singles =

Singles
- 2022 Challenger Coquimbo

Final
- Champion: (Argentina) Facundo Díaz Acosta
- Runner-up: (Brazil) Pedro Boscardin Dias
- Score: 7–5, 7–6^{(7–4)}

Events
Singles	Doubles
- Challenger Coquimbo

This was the first edition of the tournament.

Facundo Díaz Acosta won the title after defeating Pedro Boscardin Dias 7–5, 7–6^{(7–4)} in the final.

== Seeds ==
1. (Chile) Tomás Barrios Vera (quarterfinals)
2. (Argentina) Santiago Rodríguez Taverna (second round)
3. (Argentina) Andrea Collarini (quarterfinals)
4. (Argentina) Genaro Alberto Olivieri (second round)
5. (Chile) Gonzalo Lama (second round)
6. (Brazil) Daniel Dutra da Silva (first round)
7. (Brazil) Orlando Luz (first round)
8. (Colombia) Nicolás Mejía (first round)

== Draw ==
Key

- Q = Qualifier
- WC = Wild card
- LL = Lucky loser
- Alt = Alternate
- ITF = ITF entry
- PR = Protected ranking
- SR = Special ranking
- SE = Special exempt
- JE = Junior exempt
- JR = Junior Accelerator Programme entrant
- CO = College Accelerator Programme entrant
- NG = Next Gen Accelerator Program entrant
- w/o = Walkover
- r = Retired
- d = Defaulted

=== Finals ===
Semifinals
(Argentina) Facundo Díaz Acosta	6	6
(Argentina) Francisco Comesaña	1	4
(Argentina) Juan Bautista Torres	6^{3}	3
WC	(Brazil) Pedro Boscardin Dias	7^{7}	6

Final
(Argentina) Facundo Díaz Acosta	7	7^{7}
WC	(Brazil) Pedro Boscardin Dias	5	6^{4}

=== Top half ===
First round
1	(Chile) T Barrios Vera	6	2	7
Alt	(Argentina) RA Burruchaga	2	6	5
WC	(Chile) Nicolás Villalón	2	2
Q	(Peru) C Huertas del Pino	6	6
(Brazil) Gilbert Klier Júnior	2	2
(Argentina) F Díaz Acosta	6	6
(Argentina) H Casanova	6^{1}	6	6
8	(Colombia) N Mejía	7^{7}	1	4
4	(Argentina) GA Olivieri	6	6
Q	(Japan) N Nakagawa	2	3
Q	(Bolivia) M Dellien	3	3
(Argentina) F Comesaña	6	6
(Colombia) C Rodríguez	5	4
(Spain) P Martín Tiffon	7	6
(Argentina) G Villanueva	4	6	2
5	(Chile) G Lama	6	4	6

Second round
1	(Chile) T Barrios Vera	6	6
Q	(Peru) C Huertas del Pino	4	1
(Argentina) F Díaz Acosta	7^{7}	6
(Argentina) H Casanova	6^{1}	0
4	(Argentina) GA Olivieri	3	4
(Argentina) F Comesaña	6	6
(Spain) P Martín Tiffon	6	6
5	(Chile) G Lama	1	3

Quarterfinals
1	(Chile) T Barrios Vera	4	3
(Argentina) F Díaz Acosta	6	6
(Argentina) F Comesaña	7^{7}	6
(Spain) P Martín Tiffon	6^{3}	1

Semifinals
(Argentina) F Díaz Acosta	6	6
(Argentina) F Comesaña	1	4

=== Bottom half ===
First round
7	(Brazil) O Luz	3	6^{5}
(Argentina) JB Torres	6	7^{7}
(Ecuador) R Quiroz	4	4
Q	(Brazil) JL Reis da Silva	6	6
(Bulgaria) A Andreev	6	6
(Argentina) AL Lingua Lavallén	2	4
(Argentina) Matías Zukas	6^{5}	2
3	(Argentina) A Collarini	7^{7}	6
6	(Brazil) D Dutra da Silva	4	6^{4}
(Brazil) G Heide	6	7^{7}
WC	(Brazil) P Boscardin Dias	6	6
Q	(Brazil) Wilson Leite	3	0
(Peru) N Álvarez	5	2
Q	(Peru) A Huertas del Pino	7	6
Alt	(Argentina) MF Descotte	3	7^{7}	1
2/WC	(Argentina) S Rodríguez Taverna	6	6^{0}	6

Second round
(Argentina) JB Torres	6	4	6
Q	(Brazil) JL Reis da Silva	3	6	2
(Bulgaria) A Andreev	4	2
3	(Argentina) A Collarini	6	6
(Brazil) G Heide	6^{1}	4
WC	(Brazil) P Boscardin Dias	7^{7}	6
Q	(Peru) A Huertas del Pino	7^{7}	6
2/WC	(Argentina) S Rodríguez Taverna	6^{5}	4

Quarterfinals
(Argentina) JB Torres	0	6	6
3	(Argentina) A Collarini	6	4	0
WC	(Brazil) P Boscardin Dias	1	6	6
Q	(Peru) A Huertas del Pino	6	4	4

Semifinals
(Argentina) JB Torres	6^{3}	3
WC	(Brazil) P Boscardin Dias	7^{7}	6
