= 2022 Uruguay Open – Doubles =

Doubles
- 2022 Uruguay Open

Final
- Champions: (Poland) Karol Drzewiecki (Poland) Piotr Matuszewski
- Runners-up: (Argentina) Facundo Díaz Acosta (Venezuela) Luis David Martínez
- Score: 6–4, 6–4

Events
Singles	Doubles
- Uruguay Open

Rafael Matos and Felipe Meligeni Alves were the defending champions but only Meligeni Alves chose to defend his title, partnering Matheus Pucinelli de Almeida. They withdrew before their first round match.

Karol Drzewiecki and Piotr Matuszewski won the title after defeating Facundo Díaz Acosta and Luis David Martínez 6–4, 6–4 in the final.

== Seeds ==
1. (Argentina) Guido Andreozzi / (Argentina) Guillermo Durán (semifinals)
2. (Bolivia) Boris Arias / (Bolivia) Federico Zeballos (first round)
3. (Argentina) Facundo Díaz Acosta / (Venezuela) Luis David Martínez (final)
4. (Poland) Karol Drzewiecki / (Poland) Piotr Matuszewski (champions)

== Draw ==
Key

- Q = Qualifier
- WC = Wild card
- LL = Lucky loser
- Alt = Alternate
- ITF = ITF entry
- PR = Protected ranking
- SR = Special ranking
- SE = Special exempt
- JE = Junior exempt
- JR = Junior Accelerator Programme entrant
- CO = College Accelerator Programme entrant
- NG = Next Gen Accelerator Program entrant
- w/o = Walkover
- r = Retired
- d = Defaulted

First round
1	(Argentina) G Andreozzi (Argentina) G Durán	6	2
(Tunisia) M Echargui (Argentina) S Rodríguez Taverna	0	0^{r}
4	(Poland) K Drzewiecki (Poland) P Matuszewski	6	6
(Argentina) GA Olivieri (Argentina) Matías Zukas	2	2
WC	(Brazil) Wilson Leite (Uruguay) F Roncadelli	4	6	[9]
WC	(Uruguay) Federico Aguilar Cardozo (Uruguay) J Aguilar Cardozo	6	3	[11]
(Uruguay) I Carou (Argentina) F Comesaña	6	6
(United Kingdom) J Choinski (Netherlands) M Houkes	2	2
Alt	(Argentina) G Villanueva (Switzerland) D Wenger	6^{4}	6	[10]
PR	(Argentina) G Pella (Argentina) C Ugo Carabelli	7^{7}	4	[12]
(Argentina) Juan Ignacio Galarza (Argentina) T Lipovšek Puches	6	6
2	(Bolivia) B Arias (Bolivia) F Zeballos	3	4

Quarterfinals
1	(Argentina) G Andreozzi (Argentina) G Durán	6	6
(Portugal) J Domingues (Portugal) G Elias	4	1
4	(Poland) K Drzewiecki (Poland) P Matuszewski	6	6
WC	(Uruguay) F Aguilar Cardozo (Uruguay) J Aguilar Cardozo	1	3
(Uruguay) I Carou (Argentina) F Comesaña	4	3
3	(Argentina) F Díaz Acosta (Venezuela) LD Martínez	6	6
PR	(Argentina) G Pella (Argentina) C Ugo Carabelli	6	6
(Argentina) JI Galarza (Argentina) T Lipovšek Puches	2	2

Semifinals
1	(Argentina) G Andreozzi (Argentina) G Durán	4	6	[5]
4	(Poland) K Drzewiecki (Poland) P Matuszewski	6	0	[10]
3	(Argentina) F Díaz Acosta (Venezuela) LD Martínez	6	6
PR	(Argentina) G Pella (Argentina) C Ugo Carabelli	1	2

Final
4	(Poland) K Drzewiecki (Poland) P Matuszewski	6	6
3	(Argentina) F Díaz Acosta (Venezuela) LD Martínez	4	4
