= 2023 Uruguay Open – Singles =

Singles
- 2023 Uruguay Open

Final
- Champion: (Argentina) Facundo Díaz Acosta
- Runner-up: (Brazil) Thiago Monteiro
- Score: 6–3, 4–3 ret.

Events
Singles	Doubles
- Uruguay Open

Genaro Alberto Olivieri was the defending champion but chose not to defend his title.

Facundo Díaz Acosta won the title after Thiago Monteiro retired trailing 3–6, 3–4 in the final.

== Seeds ==
1. (Argentina) Pedro Cachin (first round)
2. (Argentina) Federico Coria (first round)
3. (Chile) Tomás Barrios Vera (quarterfinals)
4. (Argentina) Facundo Díaz Acosta (champion)
5. (Chile) Alejandro Tabilo (first round)
6. (Bolivia) Hugo Dellien (semifinals)
7. (Argentina) Thiago Agustín Tirante (first round)
8. (Argentina) Francisco Comesaña (first round, retired)

== Draw ==
Key

- Q = Qualifier
- WC = Wild card
- LL = Lucky loser
- Alt = Alternate
- ITF = ITF entry
- PR = Protected ranking
- SR = Special ranking
- SE = Special exempt
- JE = Junior exempt
- JR = Junior Accelerator Programme entrant
- CO = College Accelerator Programme entrant
- NG = Next Gen Accelerator Program entrant
- w/o = Walkover
- r = Retired
- d = Defaulted

=== Finals ===
Semifinals
(Brazil) Gustavo Heide	6	3	5
4	(Argentina) Facundo Díaz Acosta	4	6	7
6	(Bolivia) Hugo Dellien	6^{1}	6	3
(Brazil) Thiago Monteiro	7^{7}	1	6

Final
4	(Argentina) Facundo Díaz Acosta	6	4
(Brazil) Thiago Monteiro	3	3^{r}

=== Top half ===
First round
1	(Argentina) P Cachin	4	3
Q	(Netherlands) M Houkes	6	6
(Brazil) G Heide	6	7
WC	(Uruguay) I Carou	3	5
(Argentina) G Andreozzi	3	2
(Argentina) F Bagnis	6	6
(Italy) Edoardo Lavagno	6	0
8	(Argentina) F Comesaña	1	0^{r}
4	(Argentina) F Díaz Acosta	6	7
(Italy) A Giannessi	1	5
(Italy) F Agamenone	4	1
Q	(Brazil) P Sakamoto	6	6
Q	(Ecuador) Á Guillén Meza	7^{7}	6^{4}	6
(Italy) L Darderi	6^{4}	7^{7}	4
(Argentina) RA Burruchaga	6	1	6
7	(Argentina) TA Tirante	2	6	2

Second round
Q	(Netherlands) M Houkes	1	3
(Brazil) G Heide	6	6
(Argentina) F Bagnis	6	6
(Italy) E Lavagno	1	2
4	(Argentina) F Díaz Acosta	6	6
Q	(Brazil) P Sakamoto	1	2
Q	(Ecuador) Á Guillén Meza	6	4	3
(Argentina) RA Burruchaga	4	6	6

Quarterfinals
(Brazil) G Heide	7^{11}	3	6
(Argentina) F Bagnis	6^{9}	6	3
4	(Argentina) F Díaz Acosta	4	6	6
(Argentina) RA Burruchaga	6	4	3

Semifinals
(Brazil) G Heide	6	3	5
4	(Argentina) F Díaz Acosta	4	6	7

=== Bottom half ===
First round
6	(Bolivia) H Dellien	6	6
(Spain) O Roca Batalla	3	3
LL	(Argentina) R Olivo	6	3	6
Q	(Brazil) O Luz	4	6	4
WC	(Uruguay) F Roncadelli	7	3	2
(Argentina) A Collarini	5	6	6
WC	(Uruguay) J Aguilar Cardozo	4	1
3	(Chile) T Barrios Vera	6	6
5	(Chile) A Tabilo	3	4
Q	(Argentina) S Rodríguez Taverna	6	6
Q	(Bolivia) M Dellien	0	4
(Brazil) T Monteiro	6	6
(Brazil) F Meligeni Alves	6	4	4
(Sweden) E Ymer	3	6	6
(Argentina) C Ugo Carabelli	7^{7}	6
2	(Argentina) F Coria	6^{3}	0

Second round
6	(Bolivia) H Dellien	5	6	6
LL	(Argentina) R Olivo	7	3	4
(Argentina) A Collarini	3	2
3	(Chile) T Barrios Vera	6	6
Q	(Argentina) S Rodríguez Taverna	5	3
(Brazil) T Monteiro	7	6
(Sweden) E Ymer	2	7^{8}	1
(Argentina) C Ugo Carabelli	6	6^{6}	6

Quarterfinals
6	(Bolivia) H Dellien	6	0	6
3	(Chile) T Barrios Vera	4	6	4
(Brazil) T Monteiro	6	4	6
(Argentina) C Ugo Carabelli	1	6	4

Semifinals
6	(Bolivia) H Dellien	6^{1}	6	3
(Brazil) T Monteiro	7^{7}	1	6
