= 2013 Aberto de Tênis do Rio Grande do Sul – Doubles =

Doubles
- 2013 Aberto de Tênis do Rio Grande do Sul

Final
- Champions: (Argentina) Guillermo Durán (Argentina) Máximo González
- Runners-up: (Dominican Republic) Víctor Estrella (Brazil) João Souza
- Score: 3–6, 6–1, [10–5]

Events
Singles	Doubles
- Aberto de Tênis do Rio Grande do Sul

Marcelo Demoliner and João Souza were the defending champions but decided not to compete together.
Souza teamed up with Víctor Estrella, but lost in the final.
Demoliner teamed up with Thiemo de Bakker but lost in the semifinals.

Guillermo Durán and Máximo González won the title, defeating Estrella and Souza in the final, 3–6, 6–1, [10–5].

== Seeds ==
1. (Netherlands) Thiemo de Bakker / (Brazil) Marcelo Demoliner (semifinals)
2. (Argentina) Facundo Bagnis / (Argentina) Eduardo Schwank (semifinals)
3. (Moldova) Roman Borvanov / (New Zealand) Artem Sitak (first round)
4. (Dominican Republic) Víctor Estrella / (Brazil) João Souza (final)

== Draw ==
Key

- Q = Qualifier
- WC = Wild card
- LL = Lucky loser
- Alt = Alternate
- ITF = ITF entry
- PR = Protected ranking
- SR = Special ranking
- SE = Special exempt
- JE = Junior exempt
- JR = Junior Accelerator Programme entrant
- CO = College Accelerator Programme entrant
- NG = Next Gen Accelerator Program entrant
- w/o = Walkover
- r = Retired
- d = Defaulted

=== Draw ===
First round
1	(Netherlands) T de Bakker (Brazil) M Demoliner	6	6
(Brazil) R Dutra da Silva (Brazil) L Kirche	3	2
(Argentina) G Andreozzi (Argentina) A Collarini	4	0
(Guatemala) C Diaz-Figueroa (Venezuela) D Souto	6	6
3	(Moldova) R Borvanov (New Zealand) A Sitak	4	6	[9]
WC	(Brazil) E Dischinger (Brazil) R Matos	6	3	[11]
(Argentina) G Durán (Argentina) M González	6	6
WC	(Brazil) João Lucas Menezes (Brazil) Evaldo Neto	2	4
(Peru) S Galdós (Argentina) G Pella	0	6	[6]
(Brazil) F Neis (Portugal) P Sousa	6	4	[10]
WC	(Brazil) Gabriel Vellinho Hocevar (Brazil) R Hocevar	4	4
4	(Dominican Republic) V Estrella (Brazil) J Souza	6	6
(Brazil) G Clezar (Brazil) A Ghem	6	7^{7}
(Argentina) F Argüello (Argentina) P Heras	3	6^{1}
Alt	(Chile) Bastían Malla (Argentina) A Schneiter	5	2
2	(Argentina) F Bagnis (Argentina) E Schwank	7	6

Quarterfinals
1	(Netherlands) T de Bakker (Brazil) M Demoliner	6	6
(Guatemala) C Diaz-Figueroa (Venezuela) D Souto	1	3
WC	(Brazil) E Dischinger (Brazil) R Matos	3	6	[9]
(Argentina) G Durán (Argentina) M González	6	4	[11]
(Brazil) F Neis (Portugal) P Sousa	2	0
4	(Dominican Republic) V Estrella (Brazil) J Souza	6	6
(Brazil) G Clezar (Brazil) A Ghem
2	(Argentina) F Bagnis (Argentina) E Schwank	w/o

Semifinals
1	(Netherlands) T de Bakker (Brazil) M Demoliner	6^{5}	6	[9]
(Argentina) G Durán (Argentina) M González	7^{7}	3	[11]
4	(Dominican Republic) V Estrella (Brazil) J Souza	6	7^{7}
2	(Argentina) F Bagnis (Argentina) E Schwank	1	6^{3}

Final
(Argentina) G Durán (Argentina) M González	3	6	[10]
4	(Dominican Republic) V Estrella (Brazil) J Souza	6	1	[5]
