= 2023 Challenger Coquimbo =

- Date: 1–6 May 2023
- Edition: 3rd
- Surface: Clay
- Location: Coquimbo, Chile

Champions

Singles
- (Brazil) Matheus Pucinelli de Almeida

Doubles
- (Argentina) Valerio Aboian / (Bolivia) Murkel Dellien
- Challenger Coquimbo

The 2023 Challenger Coquimbo was a professional tennis tournament played on clay courts. It was part of the 2023 ATP Challenger Tour. It took place in Coquimbo, Chile between 1 and 6 May 2023.

== Singles main-draw entrants ==
=== Seeds ===
Country	Player	Rank^{1}	Seed
DOM	Nick Hardt	220	1
BRA	Thiago Seyboth Wild	226	2
ARG	Santiago Rodríguez Taverna	233	3
ARG	Francisco Comesaña	249	4
ARG	Hernán Casanova	251	5
ARG	Juan Bautista Torres	259	6
ARG	Román Andrés Burruchaga	262	7
BRA	João Lucas Reis da Silva	282	8

- Rankings are as of 24 April 2023.

=== Other entrants ===
The following players received wildcards into the singles main draw:

- (Chile) Daniel Antonio Núñez
- (Brazil) Thiago Seyboth Wild
- (Chile) Nicolás Villalón

The following player received entry into the singles main draw as an alternate:

- (Argentina) Leonardo Aboian

The following players received entry from the qualifying draw:

- (Brazil) Mateus Alves
- (Argentina) Alex Barrena
- (Argentina) Santiago de la Fuente
- (Peru) Arklon Huertas del Pino
- (Peru) Conner Huertas del Pino
- (Argentina) Ignacio Monzón

== Champions ==
=== Singles ===
- (Brazil) Matheus Pucinelli de Almeida def. (Brazil) João Lucas Reis da Silva 7–6^{(7–1)}, 6–7^{(4–7)}, 6–4.

=== Doubles ===
- (Argentina) Valerio Aboian / (Bolivia) Murkel Dellien def. (Argentina) Tomás Farjat / (Italy) Facundo Juárez 7–6^{(7–4)}, 6–0.
