= Claro Open Cali =

Defunct tennis tournament
- Location: Cali, Colombia
- Category: ATP Challenger Tour
- Surface: Red clay
- Draw: 32S/32Q/16D
- Prize money: $40,000
- Website: Website

The Claro Open Cali was a professional tennis tournament played on outdoor red clay courts. It was part of the Association of Tennis Professionals (ATP) Challenger Tour. It was held once in Cali, Colombia in September 2014.

== Past finals ==
=== Singles ===
Year	Champion	Runner-up	Score
2014	(Italy) Paolo Lorenzi	(Dominican Republic) Víctor Estrella Burgos	4–6, 6–3, 6–3

=== Doubles ===
Year	Champions	Runners-up	Score
2014	(Argentina) Guido Andreozzi (Argentina) Guillermo Durán	(Colombia) Alejandro González (Mexico) César Ramírez	6–3, 6–4
