= Challenger Coquimbo =

Tennis tournament in Chile

Defunct tennis tournament
- Event name: Challenger Dove Men+Care Coquimbo
- Location: Coquimbo, Chile
- Venue: Cedt La Serena Tennis Academy
- Category: ATP Challenger Tour
- Surface: Clay

The Challenger Dove Men+Care Coquimbo was a professional tennis tournament played on clay courts. It was part of the Association of Tennis Professionals (ATP) Challenger Tour. It was held in Coquimbo, Chile, in 2022 and in 2023 as part of the Legión Sudamericana.

== Past finals ==
=== Singles ===
Year	Champion	Runner-up	Score
2022 (1)	(Argentina) Facundo Díaz Acosta	(Brazil) Pedro Boscardin Dias	7–5, 7–6^{(7–4)}
2022 (2)	(Argentina) Juan Manuel Cerúndolo	(Argentina) Facundo Díaz Acosta	6–3, 3–6, 6–4
2023	(Brazil) Matheus Pucinelli de Almeida	(Brazil) João Lucas Reis da Silva	7–6^{(7–1)}, 6–7^{(4–7)}, 6–4

=== Doubles ===
Year	Champions	Runners-up	Score
2022 (1)	(Argentina) Guillermo Durán (Colombia) Nicolás Mejía	(Ecuador) Diego Hidalgo (Colombia) Cristian Rodríguez	6–4, 1–6, [10–7]
2022 (2)	(Italy) Franco Agamenone (Argentina) Hernán Casanova	(Poland) Karol Drzewiecki (Switzerland) Jakub Paul	6–3, 6–4
2023	(Argentina) Valerio Aboian (Bolivia) Murkel Dellien	(Argentina) Tomás Farjat (Italy) Facundo Juárez	7–6^{(7–4)}, 6–0
