= Aberto de Tênis do Rio Grande do Sul =

Defunct tennis tournament
- Location: Porto Alegre; Brazil
- Venue: Sociedade de Ginastica Porto Alegre
- Category: ATP Challenger Tour
- Surface: Clay
- Draw: 32S/16Q/16D
- Prize money: US$35,000+H
- Website: Website

The Aberto de Tênis do Rio Grande do Sul was a tennis tournament held in Porto Alegre, Brazil since 2012. The event has been part of the ATP Challenger Tour from 2012 until 2015 and was played on clay courts.

== Past finals ==
=== Singles ===
Year	Champion	Runner-up	Score
2015	(Argentina) Guido Pella	(Argentina) Diego Schwartzman	6–3, 7–6^{(7–5)}
2014	(Argentina) Carlos Berlocq	(Argentina) Diego Schwartzman	6–4, 4–6, 6–0
2013	(Argentina) Facundo Argüello	(Argentina) Máximo González	6–4, 6–1
2012	(Germany) Simon Greul	(Portugal) Gastão Elias	2–6, 7–6^{(7–5)}, 7–5

=== Doubles ===
Year	Champions	Runners-up	Score
2015	(Portugal) Gastão Elias (Portugal) Frederico Ferreira Silva	(Chile) Christian Garin (Chile) Juan Carlos Sáez	6–2, 6–4
2014	(Argentina) Guido Andreozzi (Argentina) Guillermo Durán	(Argentina) Facundo Bagnis (Argentina) Diego Schwartzman	6–3, 6–3
2013	(Argentina) Guillermo Durán (Argentina) Máximo González	(Dominican Republic) Víctor Estrella (Brazil) João Souza	3–6, 6–1, [10–5]
2012	(Brazil) Marcelo Demoliner (Brazil) João Souza	(Germany) Simon Greul (Italy) Alessandro Motti	6–3, 3–6, [10–7]
