= Guillermo Durán =

Argentine tennis player

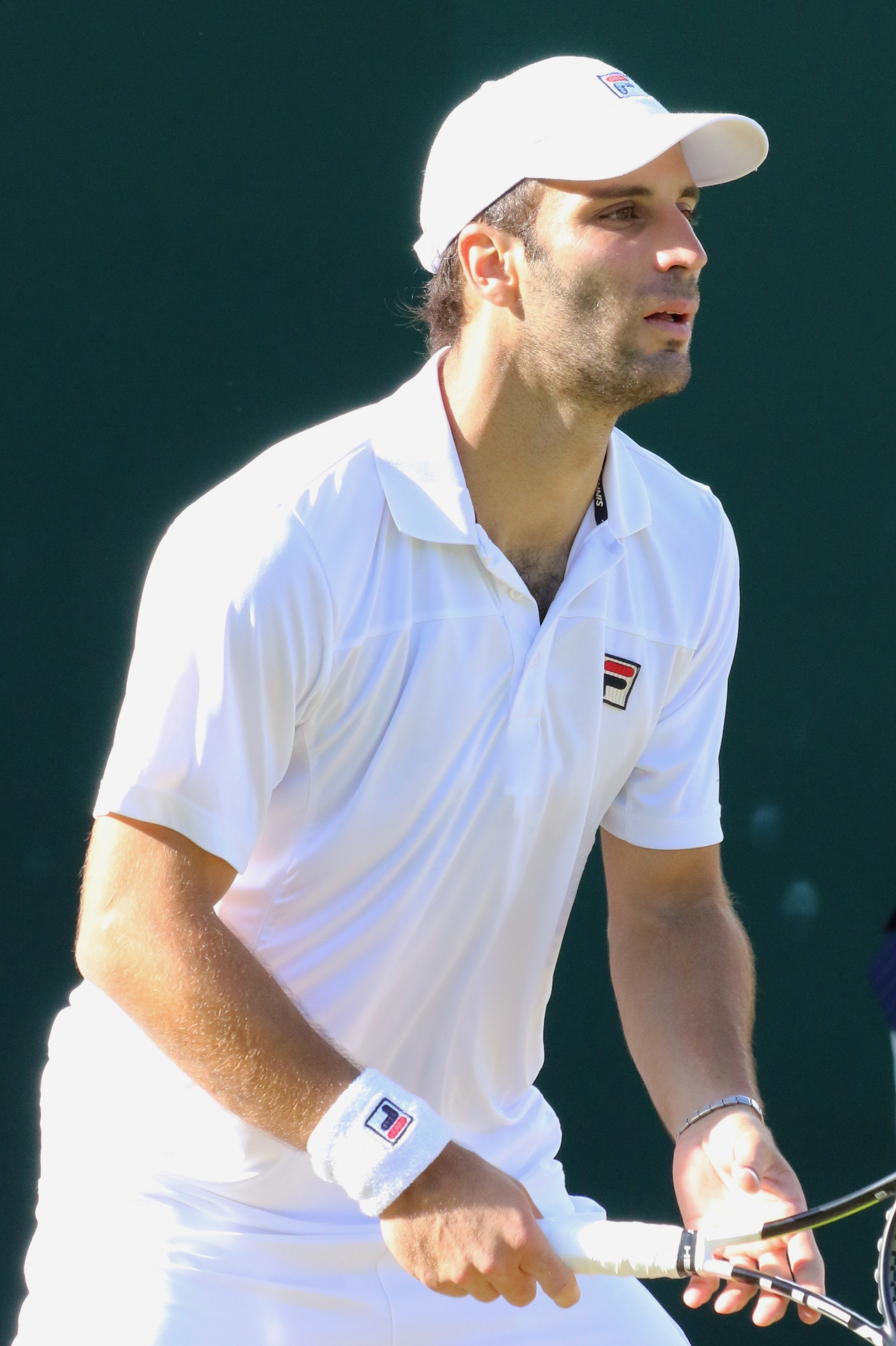
- Durán in 2016
- Country (sports): Argentina
- Residence: Tucumán, Argentina
- Born: 6 June 1988 (age 38) Tucumán, Argentina
- Height: 1.78 m (5 ft 10 in)
- Turned pro: 2009
- Retired: November 2025 (last match played)
- Plays: Right-handed (two-handed backhand)
- Coach: Francisco Yunis, Gastón Etlis
- Prize money: US $760,304

Singles
- Career record: 0–0
- Career titles: 0
- Highest ranking: No. 385 (2 April 2012)

Doubles
- Career record: 65–94
- Career titles: 4
- Highest ranking: No. 48 (23 May 2016)

Grand Slam doubles results
- Australian Open: 1R (2016, 2017, 2018, 2019, 2020, 2021, 2023)
- French Open: 3R (2019)
- Wimbledon: 2R (2015, 2016)
- US Open: 1R (2015, 2017, 2019, 2023)

Guillermo Durán (Spanish pronunciation: [ɡiˈʝeɾmo ðuˈɾan]; (Note: In isolation, Durán is pronounced [duˈɾan].) born 6 June 1988) is an Argentine inactive tennis player, who specializes in doubles. He competes mostly on the ATP Challenger Tour. His highest ATP doubles ranking of world No. 48 was achieved on 23 May 2016 and his highest ATP singles ranking of No. 385 was reached on 2 April 2012.

== ATP career finals ==
=== Doubles: 5 (4 titles, 1 runner-up) ===
Legend Grand Slam tournaments (0–0) ATP World Tour Finals (0–0) ATP World Tour Masters 1000 (0–0) ATP World Tour 500 Series (0–0) ATP World Tour 250 Series (4–1)	Titles by surface Hard (0–0) Clay (4–1) Grass (0–0)	Titles by setting Outdoor (4–1) Indoor (0–0)

Result	W–L	Date	Tournament	Tier	Surface	Partner	Opponents	Score
Win	1–0	Feb 2016	Ecuador Open, Ecuador	250 Series	Clay	(Spain) Pablo Carreño Busta	(Brazil) Thomaz Bellucci (Brazil) Marcelo Demoliner	7–5, 6–4
Win	2–0	Apr 2016	Grand Prix Hassan II, Morocco	250 Series	Clay	(Argentina) Máximo González	(Croatia) Marin Draganja (Pakistan) Aisam-ul-Haq Qureshi	6–2, 3–6, [10–6]
Win	3–0	Jul 2017	Croatia Open, Croatia	250 Series	Clay	(Argentina) Andrés Molteni	(Croatia) Marin Draganja (Croatia) Tomislav Draganja	6–3, 6–7^{(4–7)}, [10–6]
Win	4–0	Aug 2017	Austrian Open, Austria	250 Series	Clay	(Uruguay) Pablo Cuevas	(Chile) Hans Podlipnik-Castillo (Belarus) Andrei Vasilevski	6–4, 4–6, [12–10]
Loss	4–1	Feb 2020	Argentina Open, Argentina	250 Series	Clay	(Argentina) Juan Ignacio Londero	(Spain) Marcel Granollers (Argentina) Horacio Zeballos	4–6, 7–5, [16–18]

== Challenger and Futures finals ==
=== Singles: 10 (1–9) ===
Legend (singles) ATP Challenger Tour (0–0) ITF Futures Tour (1–9)	Titles by surface Hard (0–0) Clay (1–9) Grass (0–0) Carpet (0–0)

Result	W–L	Date	Tournament	Tier	Surface	Opponent	Score
Loss	0–1	May 2010	Argentina F4, Buenos Aires	Futures	Clay	(Argentina) Lionel Noviski	4–6, 4–6
Loss	0–2	Jun 2010	Argentina F8, Córdoba	Futures	Clay	(Argentina) Marco Trungelliti	3–6, 6–4, 2–6
Loss	0–3	Aug 2010	Argentina F16, Santiago del Estero	Futures	Clay	(Argentina) Pablo Galdón	0–6, 4–6
Loss	0–4	Jun 2011	Argentina F6, Posadas	Futures	Clay	(Argentina) Kevin Konfederak	4–6, 6–2, 5–7
Loss	0–5	Jul 2011	Argentina F9, Resistencia	Futures	Clay	(Argentina) Facundo Argüello	4–6, 2–6
Loss	0–6	Sep 2011	Argentina F17, La Rioja	Futures	Clay	(Argentina) Gastón-Arturo Grimolizzi	3–6, 6–7^{(7–9)}
Loss	0–7	Dec 2011	Brazil F42, Porto Alegre	Futures	Clay	(Argentina) Martín Alund	6–3, 3–6, 4–6
Loss	0–8	Nov 2012	Argentina F26, Rosario	Futures	Clay	(Argentina) Renzo Olivo	6–3, 2–6, 4–6
Win	1–8	Dec 2012	Argentina F28, Río Cuarto	Futures	Clay	(Argentina) Gabriel Alejandro Hidalgo	6–2, 7–5
Loss	1–9	Dec 2014	Argentina F19, Mendoza	Futures	Clay	(Poland) Grzegorz Panfil	5–7, 4–6

=== Doubles: 84 (51–33) ===
Legend (doubles) ATP Challenger Tour (40–24) ITF Futures Tour (11–9)	Titles by surface Hard (3–4) Clay (48–29) Grass (0–0) Carpet (0–0)

Result	W–L	Date	Tournament	Tier	Surface	Partner	Opponents	Score
Loss	0–1	Jun 2008	Brazil F9, Fortaleza	Futures	Hard	(Argentina) Cristhian Ignacio Benedetti	(Brazil) Diogo Cruz (Brazil) Eric Gomes	2–6, 2–6
Loss	0–2	Jul 2008	Peru F1, Arequipa	Futures	Clay	(Argentina) Cristhian Ignacio Benedetti	(Venezuela) Miguel Cicenia (France) Benjamin Dracos	4–6, 5–7
Loss	0–3	May 2009	Argentina F3, Arroyito	Futures	Clay	(Argentina) Germán Gaich	(Argentina) Andrés Molteni (Argentina) Guido Pella	2–6, 4–6
Loss	0–4	Jul 2009	Venezuela F4, Puerto Ordaz	Futures	Hard	(Argentina) Kevin Konfederak	(Venezuela) Luis David Martínez (Austria) Nikolaus Moser	1–6, 1–6
Loss	0–5	Oct 2009	Argentina F18, La Rioja	Futures	Clay	(Argentina) Valentin Florez	(Argentina) Diego Cristin (Argentina) Alejandro Fabbri	6–7^{(4–7)}, 6–7^{(9–11)}
Win	1–5	Jun 2010	Argentina F10, Posadas	Futures	Clay	(Argentina) Agustín Picco	(Argentina) Joaquín-Jesús Monteferrario (Argentina) Antonio Pastorino	4–6, 7–6^{(7–1)}, [10–5]
Win	2–5	Aug 2010	Argentina F15, Buenos Aires	Futures	Clay	(Argentina) Guillermo Bujniewicz	(Argentina) Franco Agamenone (Argentina) Facundo Argüello	6–4, 6–2
Win	3–5	Aug 2010	Argentina F16, Santiago del Estero	Futures	Clay	(Argentina) Guillermo Bujniewicz	(Argentina) Diego Cristin (Uruguay) Martín Cuevas	4–6, 6–2, [10–4]
Loss	3–6	Dec 2010	Chile F7, Talca	Futures	Clay	(Argentina) Kevin Konfederak	(Chile) Guillermo Hormazábal (Chile) Hans Podlipnik Castillo	5–7, 7–6^{(12–10)}, [5–10]
Loss	3–7	Apr 2011	Argentina F2, Villa María	Futures	Clay	(Argentina) Alejandro Kon	(Argentina) Diego Álvarez (Chile) Cristóbal Saavedra Corvalán	6–4, 5–7, [7–10]
Win	4–7	Jun 2011	Argentina F6, Posadas	Futures	Clay	(Argentina) Joaquín-Jesús Monteferrario	(Argentina) Federico Coria (Argentina) Renzo Olivo	6–4, 7–6^{(7–4)}
Win	5–7	Jun 2011	Argentina F7, Oberá	Futures	Clay	(Argentina) Patricio Heras	(Argentina) Juan Ignacio Londero (Argentina) Nicolás Pastor	6–1, 7–6^{(7–4)}
Loss	5–8	Sep 2011	Argentina F17, La Rioja	Futures	Clay	(Argentina) Juan-Manuel Romanazzi	(Argentina) Patricio Heras (Argentina) Gustavo Sterin	6–7^{(5–7)}, 3–6
Win	6–8	Dec 2011	Brazil F42, Porto Alegre	Futures	Clay	(Argentina) Renzo Olivo	(Argentina) Martín Alund (Argentina) Andrés Molteni	6–4, 6–2
Win	7–8	Mar 2012	Argentina F3, Mendoza	Futures	Clay	(Argentina) Diego Schwartzman	(Argentina) Martín Alund (Argentina) Francisco Bahamonde	6–2, 7–6^{(7–2)}
Win	8–8	Jul 2012	Argentina F18, Bell Ville	Futures	Clay	(Argentina) Renzo Olivo	(Uruguay) Martín Cuevas (Argentina) Juan Ignacio Londero	6–4, 7–5
Loss	8–9	Oct 2012	Villa Allende, Argentina	Challenger	Clay	(Uruguay) Ariel Behar	(Argentina) Facundo Bagnis (Argentina) Diego Junqueira	1–6, 2–6
Win	9–9	May 2013	Argentina F7, Bell Ville	Futures	Clay	(Argentina) Andrea Collarini	(Peru) Duilio Beretta (Peru) Sergio Galdós	6–3, 6–4
Loss	9–10	Jul 2013	Orbetello, Italy	Challenger	Clay	(Argentina) Renzo Olivo	(Italy) Marco Crugnola (Italy) Simone Vagnozzi	6–7^{(3–7)}, 7–6^{(7–5)}, [6–10]
Win	10–10	Aug 2013	Argentina F16, Santiago del Estero	Futures	Clay	(Argentina) Andrés Molteni	(Uruguay) Martín Cuevas (Peru) Sergio Galdós	6–7^{(4–7)}, 6–3, [13–11]
Win	11–10	Sep 2013	Porto Alegre, Brazil	Challenger	Clay	(Argentina) Máximo González	(Dominican Republic) Víctor Estrella Burgos (Brazil) João Souza	3–6, 6–1, [10–5]
Win	12–10	Oct 2013	San Juan, Argentina	Challenger	Clay	(Argentina) Máximo González	(Argentina) Martín Alund (Argentina) Facundo Bagnis	6–3, 6–0
Loss	12–11	Dec 2013	Brazil F20, Santa Maria	Futures	Clay	(Sweden) Christian Lindell	(Brazil) José Pereira (Brazil) Alexandre Tsuchiya	5–7, 3–6
Loss	12–12	Mar 2014	Panama City, Panama	Challenger	Clay	(Argentina) Martín Alund	(Czech Republic) František Čermák (Russia) Mikhail Elgin	6–4, 3–6, [8–10]
Loss	12–13	Apr 2014	Santos, Brazil	Challenger	Clay	(Argentina) Renzo Olivo	(Argentina) Máximo González (Argentina) Andrés Molteni	5–7, 4–6
Loss	12–14	Jun 2014	Blois, France	Challenger	Clay	(Argentina) Máximo González	(France) Tristan Lamasine (France) Laurent Lokoli	5–7, 0–6
Win	13–14	Jun 2014	Milan, Italy	Challenger	Clay	(Argentina) Máximo González	(United States) James Cerretani (Germany) Frank Moser	6–3, 6–3
Loss	13–15	Jun 2014	Padova, Italy	Challenger	Clay	(Argentina) Máximo González	(Venezuela) Roberto Maytín (Argentina) Andrés Molteni	2–6, 6–3, [8–10]
Win	14–15	Jul 2014	Todi, Italy	Challenger	Clay	(Argentina) Máximo González	(Italy) Riccardo Ghedin (Italy) Claudio Grassi	6–1, 3–6, [10–7]
Win	15–15	Sep 2014	Porto Alegre, Brazil	Challenger	Clay	(Argentina) Guido Andreozzi	(Argentina) Facundo Bagnis (Argentina) Diego Schwartzman	6–3, 6–3
Win	16–15	Oct 2014	Cali, Colombia	Challenger	Clay	(Argentina) Guido Andreozzi	(Colombia) Alejandro González (Mexico) César Ramírez	6–3, 6–4
Win	17–15	Dec 2014	Argentina F19, Mendoza	Futures	Clay	(Argentina) Mateo Nicolás Martínez	(Argentina) Patricio Heras (Argentina) Nicolás Kicker	6–3, 6–4
Win	18–15	Feb 2015	Bucaramanga, Colombia	Challenger	Clay	(Argentina) Andrés Molteni	(Colombia) Nicolás Barrientos (Colombia) Eduardo Struvay	7–5, 6–7^{(8–10)}, [10–0]
Win	19–15	Apr 2015	San Luis Potosí, Mexico	Challenger	Clay	(Argentina) Horacio Zeballos	(Peru) Sergio Galdós (Argentina) Guido Pella	7–6^{(7–4)}, 6–4
Loss	19–16	Apr 2015	León, Mexico	Challenger	Hard	(Argentina) Horacio Zeballos	(United States) Austin Krajicek (United States) Rajeev Ram	2–6, 5–7
Win	20–16	Apr 2015	Savannah, USA	Challenger	Clay	(Argentina) Horacio Zeballos	(United States) Dennis Novikov (Chile) Julio Peralta	6–4, 6–3
Win	21–16	Jun 2015	Fürth, Germany	Challenger	Clay	(Argentina) Horacio Zeballos	(Spain) Íñigo Cervantes Huegun (Argentina) Renzo Olivo	6–1, 6–3
Win	22–16	Jun 2015	Caltanissetta, Italy	Challenger	Clay	(Argentina) Guido Andreozzi	(Chinese Taipei) Lee Hsin-han (Italy) Alessandro Motti	6–3, 6–2
Win	23–16	Sep 2015	Genova, Italy	Challenger	Clay	(Argentina) Horacio Zeballos	(Italy) Andrea Arnaboldi (Italy) Alessandro Giannessi	7–5, 6–4
Loss	23–17	Oct 2015	Corrientes, Argentina	Challenger	Clay	(Argentina) Máximo González	(Chile) Julio Peralta (Argentina) Horacio Zeballos	2–6, 3–6
Win	24–17	Oct 2015	Santiago, Chile	Challenger	Clay	(Argentina) Máximo González	(Slovakia) Andrej Martin (Chile) Hans Podlipnik Castillo	7–6^{(7–2)}, 7–5
Win	25–17	Nov 2015	Guayaquil, Ecuador	Challenger	Clay	(Argentina) Andrés Molteni	(Portugal) Gastão Elias (Brazil) Fabrício Neis	6–3, 6–4
Loss	25–18	May 2016	Aix-en-Provence, France	Challenger	Clay	(Argentina) Máximo González	(Austria) Oliver Marach (Austria) Philipp Oswald	1–6, 6–4, [7–10]
Loss	25–19	May 2016	Bordeaux, France	Challenger	Clay	(Argentina) Máximo González	(Sweden) Johan Brunström (Sweden) Andreas Siljeström	1–6, 6–3, [4–10]
Loss	25–20	Mar 2017	Buenos Aires, Argentina	Challenger	Hard	(Argentina) Guido Andreozzi	(Argentina) Máximo González (Argentina) Andrés Molteni	1–6, 7–6^{(8–6)}, [5–10]
Win	26–20	Jun 2017	Prostějov, Czech Republic	Challenger	Clay	(Argentina) Andrés Molteni	(Czech Republic) Roman Jebavý (Chile) Hans Podlipnik Castillo	7–6^{(7–5)}, 6–7^{(5–7)}, [10–6]
Win	27–20	Oct 2017	Orléans, France	Challenger	Hard (i)	(Argentina) Andrés Molteni	(France) Jonathan Eysseric (France) Tristan Lamasine	6–3, 6–7^{(4–7)}, [13–11]
Loss	27–21	Mar 2018	Santiago, Chile	Challenger	Clay	(Argentina) Guido Andreozzi	(Monaco) Romain Arneodo (France) Jonathan Eysseric	6–7^{(4–7)}, 6–1, [10–12]
Loss	27–22	May 2018	Bordeaux, France	Challenger	Clay	(Argentina) Máximo González	(United States) Bradley Klahn (Canada) Peter Polansky	3–6, 6–3, [7–10]
Loss	27–23	Sep 2018	Szczecin, Poland	Challenger	Clay	(Argentina) Guido Andreozzi	(Poland) Karol Drzewiecki (Slovakia) Filip Polášek	3–6, 4–6
Win	28–23	Oct 2018	Campinas, Brazil	Challenger	Clay	(Bolivia) Hugo Dellien	(Argentina) Franco Agamenone (Brazil) Fernando Romboli	7–5, 6–4
Win	29–23	Oct 2018	Lima, Peru	Challenger	Clay	(Argentina) Guido Andreozzi	(Uruguay) Ariel Behar (Ecuador) Gonzalo Escobar	2–6, 7–6^{(7–5)}, [10–5]
Win	30–23	Nov 2018	Guayaquil, Ecuador	Challenger	Clay	(Ecuador) Roberto Quiroz	(Brazil) Thiago Monteiro (Brazil) Fabrício Neis	6–3, 6–2
Win	31–23	Nov 2018	Montevideo, Uruguay	Challenger	Clay	(Argentina) Guido Andreozzi	(Argentina) Facundo Bagnis (Argentina) Andrés Molteni	7–6^{(7–5)}, 6–4
Win	32–23	Nov 2018	Buenos Aires, Argentina	Challenger	Clay	(Argentina) Guido Andreozzi	(Brazil) Marcelo Demoliner (Argentina) Andrés Molteni	6–4, 4–6, [10–3]
Win	33–23	Jan 2019	Punta del Este, Uruguay	Challenger	Clay	(Argentina) Guido Andreozzi	(Belgium) Sander Gillé (Belgium) Joran Vliegen	6–2, 6–7^{(6–8)}, [10–8]
Win	34–23	Apr 2019	Alicante, Spain	Challenger	Clay	(Brazil) Thomaz Bellucci	(Spain) Gerard Granollers Pujol (Spain) Pedro Martínez	2–6, 7–5, [10–5]
Loss	34–24	Apr 2019	Tunis, Tunisia	Challenger	Clay	(Argentina) Facundo Argüello	(Belgium) Ruben Bemelmans (Germany) Tim Pütz	3–6, 1–6
Loss	34–25	Apr 2019	Francavilla, Italy	Challenger	Clay	(Spain) David Vega Hernández	(Ukraine) Denys Molchanov (Slovakia) Igor Zelenay	3–6, 1–6
Loss	34–26	May 2019	Lisbon, Portugal	Challenger	Clay	(Argentina) Guido Andreozzi	(Austria) Philipp Oswald (Slovakia) Filip Polášek	5–7, 2–6
Win	35–26	Jul 2019	Braunschweig, Germany	Challenger	Clay	(Italy) Simone Bolelli	(Croatia) Antonio Šančić (United States) Nathaniel Lammons	6–3, 6–2
Win	36–26	Apr 2021	Belgrade, Serbia	Challenger	Clay	(Argentina) Andrés Molteni	(Bosnia and Herzegovina) Tomislav Brkić (Serbia) Nikola Ćaćić	6–4, 6–4
Loss	36–27	May 2021	Rome, Italy	Challenger	Clay	(Argentina) Guido Andreozzi	(France) Sadio Doumbia (France) Fabien Reboul	5–7, 3–6
Win	37-27	Jul 2021	Porto, Portugal	Challenger	Hard	(Argentina) Guido Andreozzi	(Argentina) Renzo Olivo (Mexico) Miguel Ángel Reyes-Varela	6–7^{(5–7)}, 7–6^{(7–5)}, [11–9]
Win	38-27	Apr 2022	Tigre, Argentina	Challenger	Clay	(Brazil) Felipe Meligeni Alves	(Italy) Luciano Darderi (Argentina) Juan Bautista Torres	3–6, 6–4, [10–3]
Win	39-27	May 2022	Coquimbo, Chile	Challenger	Clay	(Colombia) Nicolás Mejía	(Ecuador) Diego Hidalgo (Colombia) Cristian Rodríguez	6–4, 1–6, [10–7]
Win	40-27	June 2022	Corrientes, Argentina	Challenger	Clay	(Argentina) Guido Andreozzi	(Peru) Nicolás Álvarez (Bolivia) Murkel Dellien	7-5, 6–2
Win	41-27	Jul 2022	Todi, Italy	Challenger	Clay	(Argentina) Guido Andreozzi	(Monaco) Romain Arneodo (France) Jonathan Eysseric	6–1, 2–6, [10–6]
Win	42-27	Sep 2022	Buenos Aires, Argentina	Challenger	Clay	(Argentina) Guido Andreozzi	(Argentina) Román Andrés Burruchaga (Argentina) Facundo Díaz Acosta	6–0, 7–5
Loss	42–28	Oct 2022	Campinas, Brazil	Challenger	Clay	(Argentina) Guido Andreozzi	(Bolivia) Boris Arias (Bolivia) Federico Zeballos	5–7, 2–6
Win	43–28	Oct 2022	Rio de Janeiro, Brazil	Challenger	Clay	(Argentina) Guido Andreozzi	(Poland) Karol Drzewiecki (Switzerland) Jakub Paul	6–3, 6–2
Loss	43–29	Oct 2022	Lima, Peru	Challenger	Clay	(Argentina) Guido Andreozzi	(Netherlands) Jesper de Jong (Netherlands) Max Houkes	6–7^{(6–8)}, 6–3, [10–12]
Win	44–29	Oct 2022	Guayaquil, Ecuador	Challenger	Clay	(Argentina) Guido Andreozzi	(Argentina) Facundo Díaz Acosta (Venezuela) Luis David Martínez	6–0, 6–4
Win	45–29	Nov 2022	São Leopoldo, Brazil	Challenger	Clay	(Argentina) Guido Andreozzi	(Brazil) Felipe Meligeni Alves (Brazil) João Lucas Reis da Silva	5–1 ret.
Win	46–29	Nov 2022	Temuco, Chile	Challenger	Hard	(Argentina) Guido Andreozzi	(Venezuela) Luis David Martínez (India) Jeevan Nedunchezhiyan	6–4, 6–2
Win	47–29	Jan 2023	Concepción, Chile	Challenger	Clay	(Argentina) Guido Andreozzi	(Italy) Luciano Darderi (Ukraine) Oleg Prihodko	7–6^{(7–1)}, 6–7^{(3–7)}, [10–7]
Loss	47–30	Apr 2023	Sarasota, United States	Challenger	Clay	(Argentina) Guido Andreozzi	(United Kingdom) Julian Cash (United Kingdom) Henry Patten	6–7^{(4–7)}, 4–6
Loss	47–31	Apr 2023	Ostrava, Czech Republic	Challenger	Clay	(Argentina) Guido Andreozzi	(United States) Robert Galloway (Mexico) Miguel Ángel Reyes-Varela	5–7, 6–7^{(5–7)}
Loss	47–32	Sep 2023	Bogotá, Colombia	Challenger	Clay	(Brazil) Orlando Luz	(Argentina) Renzo Olivo (Argentina) Thiago Agustín Tirante	6–7^{(6–8)}, 4–6
Win	48–32	Oct 2023	Campinas, Brazil	Challenger	Clay	(Argentina) Guido Andreozzi	(Ecuador) Diego Hidalgo (Colombia) Cristian Rodríguez	7–6^{(7–4)}, 6–3
Win	49–32	Nov 2023	Montevideo, Uruguay	Challenger	Clay	(Argentina) Guido Andreozzi	(Bolivia) Boris Arias (Bolivia) Federico Zeballos	2–6, 7–6^{(7–2)}, [10–8]
Loss	49–33	Jan 2024	Punta del Este, Uruguay	Challenger	Clay	(Argentina) Guido Andreozzi	(Bolivia) Murkel Dellien (Argentina) Federico Agustin Gomez	3–6, 2–6
Win	50–33	Jan 2024	Piracicaba, Brazil	Challenger	Clay	(Argentina) Guido Andreozzi	(Brazil) Daniel Dutra da Silva (Brazil) Pedro Sakamoto	6–2, 7–6^{(7–5)}
Win	51–33	Jul 2024	Amersfoort, Netherlands	Challenger	Clay	(Brazil) Marcelo Demoliner	(United Kingdom) Jay Clarke (United Kingdom) David Stevenson	7–6^{(7–2)}, 6–4
