= 2023 Challenger de Buenos Aires – Singles =

Singles
- 2023 Challenger de Buenos Aires

Final
- Champion: (Argentina) Mariano Navone
- Runner-up: (Argentina) Federico Coria
- Score: 2–6, 6–3, 6–4

Events
| Singles | Doubles |
| ← 2022 · | Challenger de Buenos Aires | · 2024 → |

Juan Manuel Cerúndolo was the defending champion but lost in the quarterfinals to Luciano Darderi.

Mariano Navone won the title after defeating Federico Coria 2–6, 6–3, 6–4 in the final.

== Seeds ==
1. (Argentina) Federico Coria (final)
2. (Argentina) Juan Manuel Cerúndolo (quarterfinals)
3. (Argentina) Facundo Díaz Acosta (semifinals)
4. (Chile) Tomás Barrios Vera (first round)
5. (Czech Republic) Vít Kopřiva (second round)
6. (Chile) Alejandro Tabilo (first round)
7. (Argentina) Francisco Comesaña (quarterfinals)
8. (United Kingdom) Jan Choinski (quarterfinals)

== Draw ==
=== Key ===
- Q = Qualifier
- WC = Wild card
- LL = Lucky loser
- Alt = Alternate
- SE = Special exempt
- PR = Protected ranking
- ITF = ITF entry
- JE = Junior exempt
- w/o = Walkover
- r = Retired
- d = Defaulted
- SR = Special ranking

=== Finals ===
Semifinals
1 | (Argentina) Federico Coria | 6 | 6
3 | (Argentina) Facundo Díaz Acosta | 4 | 4
(Argentina) Mariano Navone | 2 | 6 | 7
(Italy) Luciano Darderi | 6 | 4 | 5

Final
1 | (Argentina) Federico Coria | 6 | 3 | 4
(Argentina) Mariano Navone | 2 | 6 | 6

=== Top half ===
First round
1 | (Argentina) F Coria | 7^{7} | 2 | 6
WC | (Argentina) JP Ficovich | 6^{4} | 6 | 3
(Argentina) F Bagnis | 7^{7} | 5 | 6^{2}
Q | (Brazil) JL Reis da Silva | 6^{5} | 7 | 7^{7}
(Argentina) GA Olivieri | 7 | 4 | 6^{5}
(Bolivia) H Dellien | 5 | 6 | 7^{7}
(Brazil) T Monteiro | 3 | 6 | 3
8 | (United Kingdom) J Choinski | 6 | 1 | 6
3 | (Argentina) F Díaz Acosta | 6 | 6
WC | (Argentina) F Delbonis | 3 | 4
WC | (Argentina) RA Burruchaga | 0 | 4
Q | (Argentina) R Olivo | 6 | 6
(Austria) L Neumayer | 7^{7} | 4 | 2
(Slovakia) J Kovalík | 6^{5} | 6 | 6
Q | (Argentina) M Trungelliti | 4 | 3
7 | (Argentina) F Comesaña | 6 | 6

Second round
1 | (Argentina) F Coria | 6 | 6
Q | (Brazil) JL Reis da Silva | 1 | 3
(Bolivia) H Dellien | 4 | 0^{r}
8 | (United Kingdom) J Choinski | 6 | 0
3 | (Argentina) F Díaz Acosta | 6 | 6
Q | (Argentina) R Olivo | 3 | 4
(Slovakia) J Kovalík | 7^{7} | 3 | 4
7 | (Argentina) F Comesaña | 6^{3} | 6 | 6

Quarterfinals
1 | (Argentina) F Coria | 5 | 7^{7} | 6
8 | (United Kingdom) J Choinski | 7 | 6^{3} | 3
3 | (Argentina) F Díaz Acosta | 7^{7} | 4 | 7^{7}
7 | (Argentina) F Comesaña | 6^{5} | 6 | 6^{3}

Semifinals
1 | (Argentina) F Coria | 6 | 6
3 | (Argentina) F Díaz Acosta | 4 | 4

=== Bottom half ===
First round
6 | (Chile) A Tabilo | 4 | 6 | 5
(Italy) F Agamenone | 6 | 3 | 7
Q | (Argentina) G Villanueva | 2 | 6 | 6
Q | (Argentina) JB Torres | 6 | 2 | 3
Q | (Bolivia) M Dellien | 2 | 2
(Argentina) M Navone | 6 | 6
LL | (Portugal) G Elias | 4 | 6 | 7
4 | (Chile) T Barrios Vera | 6 | 2 | 5
5 | (Czech Republic) V Kopřiva | 7 | 7^{7}
(Czech Republic) D Svrčina | 5 | 6^{3}
(Brazil) F Meligeni Alves | 6 | 2 | 4
(Italy) L Darderi | 4 | 6 | 6
SE | (Italy) A Pellegrino | 7 | 6
Alt | (Argentina) G Andreozzi | 5 | 2
(Argentina) A Collarini | 3 | 3
2 | (Argentina) JM Cerúndolo | 6 | 6

Second round
(Italy) F Agamenone | 7^{7} | 6
Q | (Argentina) G Villanueva | 6^{2} | 2
(Argentina) M Navone | 3 | 6 | 7^{7}
LL | (Portugal) G Elias | 6 | 4 | 6^{3}
5 | (Czech Republic) V Kopřiva | 3 | 6 | 4
(Italy) L Darderi | 6 | 4 | 6
SE | (Italy) A Pellegrino | 2 | 6 | 4
2 | (Argentina) JM Cerúndolo | 6 | 4 | 6

Quarterfinals
(Italy) F Agamenone | 3 | 2
(Argentina) M Navone | 6 | 6
(Italy) L Darderi | 6 | 7
2 | (Argentina) JM Cerúndolo | 3 | 5

Semifinals
(Argentina) M Navone | 2 | 6 | 7
(Italy) L Darderi | 6 | 4 | 5
