= 2019 Challenger de Buenos Aires – Doubles =

Doubles
- 2019 Challenger de Buenos Aires

Final
- Champions: (Argentina) Guido Andreozzi (Argentina) Andrés Molteni
- Runners-up: (Bolivia) Hugo Dellien (Bolivia) Federico Zeballos
- Score: 6–7^{(3–7)}, 6–2, [10–1]

Events
Singles	Doubles
← 2018 ·	Challenger de Buenos Aires	· 2021 →

Guido Andreozzi and Guillermo Durán were the defending champions but only Andreozzi chose to defend his title, partnering Andrés Molteni. Andreozzi successfully defended his title.

Andreozzi and Molteni won the title after defeating Hugo Dellien and Federico Zeballos 6–7^{(3–7)}, 6–2, [10–1] in the final.

== Seeds ==
1. (Argentina) Guido Andreozzi / (Argentina) Andrés Molteni (champions)
2. (Mexico) Miguel Ángel Reyes-Varela / (Brazil) Fernando Romboli (semifinals)
3. (Venezuela) Luis David Martínez / (Brazil) Felipe Meligeni Alves (semifinals)
4. (Bolivia) Hugo Dellien / (Bolivia) Federico Zeballos (final)

== Draw ==
=== Key ===
- Q = Qualifier
- WC = Wild card
- LL = Lucky loser
- Alt = Alternate
- SE = Special exempt
- PR = Protected ranking
- ITF = ITF entry
- JE = Junior exempt
- w/o = Walkover
- r = Retired
- d = Defaulted
- SR = Special ranking

First round
1	(Argentina) G Andreozzi (Argentina) A Molteni	7^{7}	6
(Argentina) F Cerúndolo (Argentina) MF Descotte	6^{5}	3
(Argentina) F Coria (India) S Nagal	6	6
(Brazil) T Monteiro (Brazil) P Sakamoto	1	2
3	(Venezuela) LD Martínez (Brazil) F Meligeni Alves	7^{7}	5	[10]
(Peru) S Galdós (Peru) JP Varillas	6^{5}	7	[8]
WC	(Argentina) M Kestelboim (Argentina) Matías Zukas	6^{5}	6	[7]
WC	(Argentina) S Báez (Argentina) JM Cerúndolo	7^{7}	4	[10]
(Brazil) R Matos (Brazil) T Seyboth Wild	6	3	[8]
(Argentina) Maximiliano Estévez (Dominican Republic) J Hernández-Fernández	3	6	[10]
WC	(Argentina) JP Ficovich (Argentina) C Ugo Carabelli	4	7^{7}	[8]
4	(Bolivia) H Dellien (Bolivia) F Zeballos	6	6^{5}	[10]
(Brazil) O Luz (Brazil) J Menezes	4	7^{7}	[10]
(Uruguay) M Cuevas (Argentina) F Mena	6	6^{3}	[3]
(Argentina) F Bagnis (Argentina) R Olivo	6	3	[10]
2	(Mexico) MÁ Reyes-Varela (Brazil) F Romboli	3	6	[12]

Quarterfinals
1	(Argentina) G Andreozzi (Argentina) A Molteni	6	6
(Argentina) F Coria (India) S Nagal	2	3
3	(Venezuela) LD Martínez (Brazil) F Meligeni Alves	7	6^{5}	[10]
WC	(Argentina) S Báez (Argentina) JM Cerúndolo	5	7^{7}	[4]
(Argentina) M Estévez (Dominican Republic) J Hernández-Fernández	3	1
4	(Bolivia) H Dellien (Bolivia) F Zeballos	6	6
(Brazil) O Luz (Brazil) J Menezes	7^{8}	6^{6}	[5]
2	(Mexico) MÁ Reyes-Varela (Brazil) F Romboli	6^{6}	7^{8}	[10]

Semifinals
1	(Argentina) G Andreozzi (Argentina) A Molteni	6^{5}	6	[10]
3	(Venezuela) LD Martínez (Brazil) F Meligeni Alves	7^{7}	4	[7]
4	(Bolivia) H Dellien (Bolivia) F Zeballos	3	6	[10]
2	(Mexico) MÁ Reyes-Varela (Brazil) F Romboli	6	3	[8]

Final
1	(Argentina) G Andreozzi (Argentina) A Molteni	6^{3}	6	[10]
4	(Bolivia) H Dellien (Bolivia) F Zeballos	7^{7}	2	[1]
