= 2023 Challenger de Buenos Aires – Doubles =

Doubles
- 2023 Challenger de Buenos Aires

Final
- Champions: (Ecuador) Diego Hidalgo (Colombia) Cristian Rodríguez
- Runners-up: (Brazil) Fernando Romboli (Brazil) Marcelo Zormann
- Score: 6–3, 6–2

Events
Singles	Doubles
← 2022 ·	Challenger de Buenos Aires	· 2024 →

Guido Andreozzi and Guillermo Durán were the defending champions but lost in the semifinals to Fernando Romboli and Marcelo Zormann.

Diego Hidalgo and Cristian Rodríguez won the title after defeating Romboli and Zormann 6–3, 6–2 in the final.

== Seeds ==
1. (Argentina) Guido Andreozzi / (Argentina) Guillermo Durán (semifinals)
2. (Bolivia) Boris Arias / (Bolivia) Federico Zeballos (first round)
3. (Ecuador) Diego Hidalgo / (Colombia) Cristian Rodríguez (champions)
4. (Brazil) Fernando Romboli / (Brazil) Marcelo Zormann (final)

== Draw ==
=== Key ===
- Q = Qualifier
- WC = Wild card
- LL = Lucky loser
- Alt = Alternate
- ITF = ITF entry
- PR = Protected ranking
- SR = Special ranking
- SE = Special exempt
- JE = Junior exempt
- JR = Junior Accelerator Programme entrant
- CO = College Accelerator Programme entrant
- NG = Next Gen Accelerator Program entrant
- w/o = Walkover
- r = Retired
- d = Defaulted

First round
1	(Argentina) G Andreozzi (Argentina) G Durán	7^{7}	6
Alt	(Ecuador) Á Guillén Meza (Argentina) Ignacio Monzón	6^{5}	3
(Italy) R Bonadio (Slovakia) J Kovalík	4	2
(Argentina) A Collarini (Italy) A Pellegrino	6	6
4	(Brazil) F Romboli (Brazil) M Zormann	7^{11}	6
(Argentina) F Delbonis (Argentina) M Trungelliti	6^{9}	2
(Italy) L Darderi (Bolivia) M Dellien	2	4
(Czech Republic) V Kopřiva (Czech Republic) D Svrčina	6	6
(Brazil) P Boscardin Dias (Argentina) G Villanueva	2	7^{7}	[8]
(Switzerland) L Margaroli (Argentina) S Rodríguez Taverna	6	6^{4}	[10]
(Argentina) RA Burruchaga (Uruguay) I Carou	3	2
3	(Ecuador) D Hidalgo (Colombia) C Rodríguez	6	6
WC	(Argentina) A Barrena (Argentina) H Casanova	6	0	[5]
(Brazil) O Luz (Brazil) JL Reis da Silva	4	6	[10]
(Dominican Republic) N Hardt (Australia) A Taylor	3	6	[10]
2	(Bolivia) B Arias (Bolivia) F Zeballos	6	3	[3]

Quarterfinals
1	(Argentina) G Andreozzi (Argentina) G Durán	6	6
(Argentina) A Collarini (Italy) A Pellegrino	2	1
4	(Brazil) F Romboli (Brazil) M Zormann	6	6
(Czech Republic) V Kopřiva (Czech Republic) D Svrčina	2	3
(Switzerland) L Margaroli (Argentina) S Rodríguez Taverna	5	2
3	(Ecuador) D Hidalgo (Colombia) C Rodríguez	7	6
(Brazil) O Luz (Brazil) JL Reis da Silva	7^{8}	6
(Dominican Republic) N Hardt (Australia) A Taylor	6^{6}	3

Semifinals
1	(Argentina) G Andreozzi (Argentina) G Durán	2	1
4	(Brazil) F Romboli (Brazil) M Zormann	6	6
3	(Ecuador) D Hidalgo (Colombia) C Rodríguez	6^{4}	6	[10]
(Brazil) O Luz (Brazil) JL Reis da Silva	7^{7}	4	[3]

Final
4	(Brazil) F Romboli (Brazil) M Zormann	3	2
3	(Ecuador) D Hidalgo (Colombia) C Rodríguez	6	6
