= 2015 Copa Fila – Singles =

Singles
- 2015 Copa Fila

Final
- Champion: (United Kingdom) Kyle Edmund
- Runner-up: (Argentina) Carlos Berlocq
- Score: 6–0, 6–4

Events
Singles	Doubles
← 2013 ·	Copa Fila	· 2016 →

Kyle Edmund won the title, defeating Carlos Berlocq in the final 6–0, 6–4 .

== Seeds ==
1. (Argentina) Federico Delbonis (first round)
2. (Argentina) Guido Pella (first round)
3. (Argentina) Diego Schwartzman (first round)
4. (Bosnia and Herzegovina) Damir Džumhur (first round)
5. (United Kingdom) Kyle Edmund (champion)
6. (Brazil) Rogério Dutra da Silva (first round, retired)
7. (Argentina) Facundo Argüello (second round)
8. (Argentina) Carlos Berlocq (final)

== Draw ==
=== Key ===
- Q = Qualifier
- WC = Wild card
- LL = Lucky loser
- Alt = Alternate
- SE = Special exempt
- PR = Protected ranking
- ITF = ITF entry
- JE = Junior exempt
- w/o = Walkover
- r = Retired
- d = Defaulted
- SR = Special ranking

=== Finals ===
Semifinals
5	(United Kingdom) Kyle Edmund	7	6
(Argentina) Horacio Zeballos	5	0
8	(Argentina) Carlos Berlocq	6	4
Q	(Chile) Cristian Garín	2	0^{r}

Final
5	(United Kingdom) Kyle Edmund	6	6
8	(Argentina) Carlos Berlocq	0	4

=== Top half ===
First round
1	(Argentina) F Delbonis	3	7^{7}	3
(Portugal) G Elias	6	6^{4}	6
(Spain) R Carballés Baena	1	0^{r}
(Chile) H Podlipnik	6	3
(Argentina) R Olivo	7	6
WC	(Argentina) T Lipovšek	5	2
(Brazil) A Ghem	2	6	3
5	(United Kingdom) K Edmund	6	3	6
4	(Bosnia and Herzegovina) D Džumhur	4	4
(Argentina) H Zeballos	6	6
(Argentina) F Bagnis	3	7	6
Q	(Brazil) T Monteiro	6	5	1
(Brazil) G Clezar	6	6
Q	(Uruguay) M Cuevas	2	2
(Sweden) C Lindell	4	4
7	(Argentina) F Argüello	6	6

Second round
(Portugal) G Elias	2	3
(Chile) H Podlipnik	6	6
(Argentina) R Olivo	3	3
5	(United Kingdom) K Edmund	6	6
(Argentina) H Zeballos	2	6	7^{8}
(Argentina) F Bagnis	6	1	6^{6}
(Brazil) G Clezar	7^{7}	7^{7}
7	(Argentina) F Argüello	6^{3}	6^{5}

Quarterfinals
(Chile) H Podlipnik	3	4
5	(United Kingdom) K Edmund	6	6
(Argentina) H Zeballos	6	4	7^{7}
(Brazil) G Clezar	3	6	6^{1}

Semifinals
5	(United Kingdom) K Edmund	7	6
(Argentina) H Zeballos	5	0

=== Bottom half ===
First round
8	(Argentina) C Berlocq	7^{7}	6
(Argentina) M Trungelliti	6^{5}	0
(Argentina) N Kicker	6	0	6
(Argentina) P Cachin	3	6	3
WC	(Argentina) G Andreozzi	6	6
(Slovakia) A Martin	3	1
WC	(Argentina) JI Londero	4	7^{7}	6
3	(Argentina) D Schwartzman	6	6^{4}	4
6	(Brazil) R Dutra Silva	3	0^{r}
Q	(Chile) C Garín	6	0
(United Kingdom) J Ward	2	6	6
LL	(Bolivia) H Dellien	6	3	3
Q	(Argentina) A Collarini	4	6	6
WC	(Argentina) F Mena	6	3	1
(Argentina) M González	6	4	7
2	(Argentina) G Pella	4	6	5

Second round
8	(Argentina) C Berlocq	7^{7}	6
(Argentina) N Kicker	6^{3}	1
WC	(Argentina) G Andreozzi	2	6	6
WC	(Argentina) JI Londero	6	1	2
Q	(Chile) C Garín	6	6
(United Kingdom) J Ward	3	3
Q	(Argentina) A Collarini	7	2	5
(Argentina) M González	5	6	7

Quarterfinals
8	(Argentina) C Berlocq	6	6
WC	(Argentina) G Andreozzi	4	3
Q	(Chile) C Garín	6	6
(Argentina) M González	2	4

Semifinals
8	(Argentina) C Berlocq	6	4
Q	(Chile) C Garín	2	0^{r}
