= 2016 Copa Fila – Doubles =

Doubles
- 2016 Copa Fila

Final
- Champions: (Chile) Julio Peralta; (Argentina) Horacio Zeballos
- Runners-up: (Peru) Sergio Galdós; (Brazil) Fernando Romboli
- Score: 7–6^{(7–5)}, 7–6^{(7–1)}

Events
Singles	Doubles
← 2015 ·	Copa Fila	· 2017 →

Julio Peralta and Horacio Zeballos were the defending champions and successfully defended their title, defeating Sergio Galdós and Fernando Romboli 7–6^{(7–5)}, 7–6^{(7–1)} in the final.

== Seeds ==
1. (Chile) Julio Peralta / (Argentina) Horacio Zeballos (champions)
2. (Uruguay) Ariel Behar / (Brazil) Fabrício Neis (quarterfinals)
3. (Peru) Sergio Galdós / (Brazil) Fernando Romboli (final)
4. (Dominican Republic) José Hernández / (Argentina) Juan Ignacio Londero (first round)

== Draw ==
Key

- Q = Qualifier
- WC = Wild card
- LL = Lucky loser
- Alt = Alternate
- ITF = ITF entry
- PR = Protected ranking
- SR = Special ranking
- SE = Special exempt
- JE = Junior exempt
- JR = Junior Accelerator Programme entrant
- CO = College Accelerator Programme entrant
- NG = Next Gen Accelerator Program entrant
- w/o = Walkover
- r = Retired
- d = Defaulted

First round

Quarterfinals

Semifinals

Final

1
- (Chile) J Peralta
- (Argentina) H Zeballos
6
3
[10]

WC
- (Argentina) F Argüello
- (Argentina) M Peña López
3
6
[6]

1
- (Chile) J Peralta
- (Argentina) H Zeballos
5
6
[10]

- (Argentina) Maximiliano Estévez
- (Argentina) N Kicker
5
6
[9]

- (Argentina) M Kestelboim
- (Portugal) P Sousa
7
3
[4]

- (Argentina) M Kestelboim
- (Portugal) P Sousa
7
4
[11]

1
- (Chile) J Peralta
- (Argentina) H Zeballos
6^{4}
6
[10]

4
- (Dominican Republic) J Hernández
- (Argentina) JI Londero
3
3

(Brazil) T Monteiro
(Brazil) E Russi Assumpção
7^{7}
3
[3]

(Brazil) T Monteiro
(Brazil) E Russi Assumpção
6
6

(Brazil) T Monteiro
(Brazil) E Russi Assumpção
w/o

- (Argentina) A Collarini
- (Argentina) A Velotti
6
2
[11]

- (Argentina) A Collarini
- (Argentina) A Velotti

- (Argentina) F Coria
- (Argentina) T Lipovšek Puches
3
6
[9]

1
- (Chile) J Peralta
- (Argentina) H Zeballos
7^{7}
7^{7}

- (Argentina) G Durán
- (Argentina) JP Ficovich
3
3

3
- (Peru) S Galdós
- (Brazil) F Romboli
6^{5}
6^{1}

- (Spain) J Munar
- (Norway) C Ruud
6
6

- (Spain) J Munar
- (Norway) C Ruud
4
1

- (Argentina) Mateo Nicolás Martínez
- (Argentina) JP Paz
3
4

3
- (Peru) S Galdós
- (Brazil) F Romboli
6
6

3
- (Peru) S Galdós
- (Brazil) F Romboli
6
6

3
- (Peru) S Galdós
- (Brazil) F Romboli
6
7^{7}

WC
- (Argentina) F Mena
- (Argentina) C Ugo Carabelli
6
3
[12]

WC
- (Argentina) F Mena
- (Argentina) C Ugo Carabelli
4
6^{3}

- (Brazil) P Bernardi
- (Brazil) D Dutra da Silva
3
6
[10]

WC
- (Argentina) F Mena
- (Argentina) C Ugo Carabelli
6
6^{8}
[10]

WC
- (Argentina) Franco Emanuel Egea
- (Argentina) G Villanueva
0
2

2
- (Uruguay) A Behar
- (Brazil) F Neis
4
7^{10}
[8]

2
- (Uruguay) A Behar
- (Brazil) F Neis
6
6
