= 2016 Copa Fila – Singles =

Singles
- 2016 Copa Fila

Final
- Champion: (Argentina) Renzo Olivo
- Runner-up: (Argentina) Leonardo Mayer
- Score: 2–6, 7–6^{(7–3)}, 7–6^{(7–3)}

Events
Singles	Doubles
← 2015 ·	Copa Fila	· 2017 →

Kyle Edmund was the defending champion but chose not to defend his title.

Renzo Olivo won the title after defeating Leonardo Mayer 2–6, 7–6^{(7–3)}, 7–6^{(7–3)} in the final.

== Seeds ==
1. (Argentina) Horacio Zeballos (quarterfinals)
2. (Argentina) Facundo Bagnis (second round)
3. (Argentina) Carlos Berlocq (withdrew)
4. (Brazil) Thiago Monteiro (quarterfinals)
5. (Argentina) Renzo Olivo (champion)
6. (Brazil) Rogério Dutra Silva (semifinals)
7. (Argentina) Leonardo Mayer (final)
8. (Argentina) Guido Andreozzi (second round)

== Draw ==
=== Key ===
- Q = Qualifier
- WC = Wild card
- LL = Lucky loser
- Alt = Alternate
- SE = Special exempt
- PR = Protected ranking
- ITF = ITF entry
- JE = Junior exempt
- w/o = Walkover
- r = Retired
- d = Defaulted
- SR = Special ranking

=== Finals ===
Semifinals
6	(Brazil) Rogério Dutra Silva	3	6^{4}
7	(Argentina) Leonardo Mayer	6	7^{7}
5	(Argentina) Renzo Olivo	5	7	6
(Dominican Republic) José Hernández	7	5	2

Final
7	(Argentina) Leonardo Mayer	6	6^{3}	6^{3}
5	(Argentina) Renzo Olivo	2	7^{7}	7^{7}

=== Top half ===
First round
1	(Argentina) H Zeballos	6	6
WC	(Argentina) C Ugo Carabelli	1	3
(Argentina) A Velotti	5	7^{8}	6
(Argentina) F Coria	7	6^{6}	1
(Argentina) N Kicker	6	7^{7}
Q	(Brazil) B Sant'Anna	4	6^{4}
(Argentina) T Lipovšek Puches	1	3
6	(Brazil) R Dutra Silva	6	6
4	(Brazil) T Monteiro	7^{7}	2	7^{14}
(France) A Michon	6^{3}	6	6^{12}
(Argentina) Maximiliano Estévez	4	2
(Argentina) M González	6	6
WC	(Argentina) F Mena	4	6	6
Q	(Brazil) P Sakamoto	6	4	3
LL	(Argentina) Gabriel Alejandro Hidalgo	3	1
7	(Argentina) L Mayer	6	6

Second round
1	(Argentina) H Zeballos	7^{7}	3	6
(Argentina) A Velotti	6^{2}	6	3
(Argentina) N Kicker	1	7^{7}	3
6	(Brazil) R Dutra Silva	6	6^{2}	6
4	(Brazil) T Monteiro	4	6	6
(Argentina) M González	6	3	2
WC	(Argentina) F Mena	3	6	4
7	(Argentina) L Mayer	6	4	6

Quarterfinals
1	(Argentina) H Zeballos	3	6^{6}
6	(Brazil) R Dutra Silva	6	7^{8}
4	(Brazil) T Monteiro	2	3
7	(Argentina) L Mayer	6	6

Semifinals
6	(Brazil) R Dutra Silva	3	6^{4}
7	(Argentina) L Mayer	6	7^{7}

=== Bottom half ===
First round
5	(Argentina) R Olivo	1	6	6
(Argentina) JI Londero	6	4	4
(Norway) C Ruud	6	2	2
(Argentina) A Collarini	3	6	6
Q	(Brazil) M Zormann	1	4
(Portugal) P Sousa	6	6
(Argentina) JP Paz	6	4	6
LL	(Brazil) JP Sorgi	3	6	1
8	(Argentina) G Andreozzi	6	4	6
(Argentina) F Argüello	2	6	4
(Spain) J Munar	6	6
Q	(Brazil) D Dutra da Silva	4	3
WC	(Argentina) M Kestelboim	6	2	3
(Dominican Republic) J Hernández	2	6	6
(Austria) M Linzer	6^{1}	2
2	(Argentina) F Bagnis	7^{7}	6

Second round
5	(Argentina) R Olivo	6	6
(Argentina) A Collarini	2	1
(Portugal) P Sousa	7	7
(Argentina) JP Paz	5	5
8	(Argentina) G Andreozzi	3	6^{1}
(Spain) J Munar	6	7^{7}
(Dominican Republic) J Hernández	1	7^{7}	6
2	(Argentina) F Bagnis	6	6^{2}	4

Quarterfinals
5	(Argentina) R Olivo	6	6
(Portugal) P Sousa	2	3
(Spain) J Munar	7	5	2
(Dominican Republic) J Hernández	5	7	6

Semifinals
5	(Argentina) R Olivo	5	7	6
(Dominican Republic) J Hernández	7	5	2
