= 2015 Copa Fila – Doubles =

Doubles
- 2015 Copa Fila

Final
- Champions: (Chile) Julio Peralta (Argentina) Horacio Zeballos
- Runners-up: (Argentina) Guido Andreozzi (Argentina) Lukas Arnold Ker
- Score: 6–2, 7–5

Events
Singles	Doubles
← 2013 ·	Copa Fila	· 2016 →

Julio Peralta and Horacio Zeballos won the title, defeating Guido Andreozzi and Lukas Arnold Ker in the final 6–2, 7–5.

== Seeds ==
1. (Argentina) Guillermo Durán / (Argentina) Andrés Molteni (quarterfinals)
2. (Slovakia) Andrej Martin / (Chile) Hans Podlipnik (semifinals)
3. (Chile) Julio Peralta / (Argentina) Horacio Zeballos (champions)
4. (Brazil) Marcelo Demoliner / (Portugal) Gastão Elias (semifinals)

== Draw ==
=== Key ===
- Q = Qualifier
- WC = Wild card
- LL = Lucky loser
- Alt = Alternate
- SE = Special exempt
- PR = Protected ranking
- ITF = ITF entry
- JE = Junior exempt
- w/o = Walkover
- r = Retired
- d = Defaulted
- SR = Special ranking

=== Draw ===
First round
1	(Argentina) G Durán (Argentina) A Molteni	6	6
WC	(Argentina) Franco Capalbo (Argentina) Geronimo Espin Busleiman	4	4
WC	(Argentina) F Coria (Argentina) F Mena	1	4
WC	(Argentina) G Andreozzi (Argentina) L Aronald Ker	6	6
4	(Brazil) M Demoliner (Portugal) G Elias	3	6	[10]
(Peru) S Galdós (Argentina) JI Londero	6	3	[7]
(Argentina) F Argüello (Bolivia) H Dellien	6	6^{5}	[8]
(United Kingdom) A Ward (United Kingdom) J Ward	3	7^{7}	[10]
(Bosnia and Herzegovina) D Džumhur (Brazil) T Monteiro	3	1
(Brazil) A Ghem (Brazil) F Neis	6	6
Alt	(Argentina) H Casanova (Argentina) Eduardo Agustin Torre	3	4
3	(Chile) J Peralta (Argentina) H Zeballos	6	6
(Brazil) G Clezar (Uruguay) M Cuevas	4	6	[10]
(Argentina) P Cachin (Argentina) R Olivo	6	1	[4]
(Argentina) N Kicker (Sweden) C Lindell	3	5
2	(Slovakia) A Martin (Chile) H Podlipnik	6	7

Quarterfinals
1	(Argentina) G Durán (Argentina) A Molteni	5	1
WC	(Argentina) G Andreozzi (Argentina) L Aronald Ker	7	6
4	(Brazil) M Demoliner (Portugal) G Elias	w/o
(United Kingdom) A Ward (United Kingdom) J Ward
(Brazil) A Ghem (Brazil) F Neis	2	6	[8]
3	(Chile) J Peralta (Argentina) H Zeballos	6	4	[10]
(Brazil) G Clezar (Uruguay) M Cuevas	7^{9}	6
2	(Slovakia) A Martin (Chile) H Podlipnik	6^{7}	4

Semifinals
WC	(Argentina) G Andreozzi (Argentina) L Aronald Ker	6	7^{7}
4	(Brazil) M Demoliner (Portugal) G Elias	4	6^{5}
3	(Chile) J Peralta (Argentina) H Zeballos	2
(Brazil) G Clezar (Uruguay) M Cuevas	2^{r}

Final
WC	(Argentina) G Andreozzi (Argentina) L Aronald Ker	2	5
3	(Chile) J Peralta (Argentina) H Zeballos	6	7
