= 2021 Challenger de Buenos Aires – Singles =

Singles
- 2021 Challenger de Buenos Aires

Final
- Champion: (Argentina) Sebastián Báez
- Runner-up: (Brazil) Thiago Monteiro
- Score: 6–4, 6–0

Events
Singles	Doubles
← 2019 ·	Challenger de Buenos Aires	· 2022 →

Sumit Nagal was the defending champion but chose not to defend his title.

Sebastián Báez won the title after defeating Thiago Monteiro 6–4, 6–0 in the final.

== Seeds ==
1. (Brazil) Thiago Monteiro (final)
2. (Argentina) Juan Manuel Cerúndolo (semifinals)
3. (Argentina) Francisco Cerúndolo (semifinals)
4. (Peru) Juan Pablo Varillas (quarterfinals)
5. (Bolivia) Hugo Dellien (quarterfinals)
6. (Brazil) Thiago Seyboth Wild (first round)
7. (Argentina) Sebastián Báez (champion)
8. (Argentina) Tomás Martín Etcheverry (quarterfinals)

== Draw ==
=== Key ===
- Q = Qualifier
- WC = Wild card
- LL = Lucky loser
- Alt = Alternate
- SE = Special exempt
- PR = Protected ranking
- ITF = ITF entry
- JE = Junior exempt
- w/o = Walkover
- r = Retired
- d = Defaulted
- SR = Special ranking

=== Finals ===
Semifinals
1	(Brazil) Thiago Monteiro	6	2	6
3	(Argentina) Francisco Cerúndolo	1	6	3
7	(Argentina) Sebastián Báez	6	6
2	(Argentina) Juan Manuel Cerúndolo	1	2

Final
1	(Brazil) Thiago Monteiro	4	0
7	(Argentina) Sebastián Báez	6	6

=== Top half ===
First round
1	(Brazil) T Monteiro	7^{9}	3	6
(Argentina) H Casanova	6^{7}	6	2
(Argentina) N Kicker	6	2	6
(Peru) N Álvarez	3	6	3
(Argentina) TA Tirante	4	0
(Argentina) R Olivo	6	6
Q	(Argentina) Ignacio Monzón	0	3
8	(Argentina) TM Etcheverry	6	6
3	(Argentina) F Cerúndolo	4	6	6
(Argentina) C Ugo Carabelli	6	1	4
(Argentina) JP Ficovich	7^{7}	7^{8}
(Spain) N Sánchez Izquierdo	6^{1}	6^{6}
Q	(Uruguay) M Cuevas	2	6	6
Q	(Argentina) F Comesaña	6	3	2
WC	(Argentina) M Navone	3	6	6
6	(Brazil) T Seyboth Wild	6	1	2

Second round
1	(Brazil) T Monteiro	6	6
(Argentina) N Kicker	2	3
(Argentina) R Olivo	6	6^{1}	4
8	(Argentina) TM Etcheverry	3	7^{7}	6
3	(Argentina) F Cerúndolo	7	6
(Argentina) JP Ficovich	5	2
Q	(Uruguay) M Cuevas	7^{7}	7
WC	(Argentina) M Navone	6^{0}	5

Quarterfinals
1	(Brazil) T Monteiro	6	3	7
8	(Argentina) TM Etcheverry	4	6	5
3	(Argentina) F Cerúndolo	6	6
Q	(Uruguay) M Cuevas	1	1

Semifinals
1	(Brazil) T Monteiro	6	2	6
3	(Argentina) F Cerúndolo	1	6	3

=== Bottom half ===
First round
7	(Argentina) S Báez	3	6	6
(Argentina) P Cachin	6	2	3
Q	(Spain) C Gómez-Herrera	3	4
(Argentina) JI Londero	6	6
(Argentina) S Rodríguez Taverna	6	1
WC	(Argentina) RA Burruchaga	4	4^{r}
(Dominican Republic) N Hardt	3	6	2
4	(Peru) JP Varillas	6	3	6
5	(Bolivia) H Dellien	4	6	6
(Argentina) F Díaz Acosta	6	0	1
WC	(Argentina) JB Torres	2	4
(Brazil) F Meligeni Alves	6	6
(Argentina) GA Olivieri	2	6	5
(Argentina) A Collarini	6	4	7
(Argentina) G Andreozzi	4	2
2	(Argentina) JM Cerúndolo	6	6

Second round
7	(Argentina) S Báez	6	6
(Argentina) JI Londero	3	4
(Argentina) S Rodríguez Taverna	4	2
4	(Peru) JP Varillas	6	6
5	(Bolivia) H Dellien	3	7	7^{8}
(Brazil) F Meligeni Alves	6	5	6^{6}
(Argentina) A Collarini	4	6	4
2	(Argentina) JM Cerúndolo	6	3	6

Quarterfinals
7	(Argentina) S Báez	7	6
4	(Peru) JP Varillas	5	2
5	(Bolivia) H Dellien	6	5	6^{5}
2	(Argentina) JM Cerúndolo	2	7	7^{7}

Semifinals
7	(Argentina) S Báez	6	6
2	(Argentina) JM Cerúndolo	1	2
