= 2018 Challenger de Buenos Aires – Singles =

Singles
- 2018 Challenger de Buenos Aires

Final
- Champion: (Spain) Pablo Andújar
- Runner-up: (Argentina) Pedro Cachin
- Score: 6–3, 6–1

Events
Singles	Doubles
← 2017 ·	Challenger de Buenos Aires	· 2019 →

Nicolás Kicker was the defending champion but was suspended from tennis due to match-fixing.

Pablo Andújar won the title after defeating Pedro Cachin 6–3, 6–1 in the final.

== Seeds ==
1. (Argentina) Guido Andreozzi (first round)
2. (Spain) Pablo Andújar (champion)
3. (Brazil) Thiago Monteiro (first round)
4. (Portugal) Pedro Sousa (first round, retired)
5. (Bolivia) Hugo Dellien (second round)
6. (Argentina) Carlos Berlocq (first round)
7. (Italy) Gianluigi Quinzi (second round)
8. (Argentina) Facundo Bagnis (first round)

== Draw ==
=== Key ===
- Q = Qualifier
- WC = Wild card
- LL = Lucky loser
- Alt = Alternate
- SE = Special exempt
- PR = Protected ranking
- ITF = ITF entry
- JE = Junior exempt
- w/o = Walkover
- r = Retired
- d = Defaulted
- SR = Special ranking

=== Finals ===
Semifinals
(Bulgaria) Dimitar Kuzmanov	3	6^{6}
(Argentina) Pedro Cachin	6	7^{8}
Q	(Argentina) Federico Coria	6^{5}	5
2	(Spain) Pablo Andújar	7^{7}	7

Final
(Argentina) Pedro Cachin	3	1
2	(Spain) Pablo Andújar	6	6

=== Top half ===
First round
1	(Argentina) G Andreozzi	6^{5}	4
Q	(Chile) Bastián Malla	7^{7}	6
(Spain) D Gimeno Traver	7^{8}	5	6
(Italy) F Gaio	6^{6}	7	3
(Bulgaria) D Kuzmanov	5	6	6
Alt	(Argentina) A Collarini	7	1	1
(Brazil) T Bellucci	4	6	3
7	(Italy) G Quinzi	6	4	6
3	(Brazil) T Monteiro	0	3
(Argentina) P Cachin	6	6
Q	(Brazil) O Luz	6	3	6
WC	(Argentina) F Cerúndolo	3	6	4
(Argentina) F Argüello	6	6
WC	(Argentina) R Olivo	1	2
Q	(Argentina) G Villanueva	4	3
5	(Bolivia) H Dellien	6	6

Second round
Q	(Chile) B Malla	6	6
(Spain) D Gimeno Traver	2	4
(Bulgaria) D Kuzmanov	6	6
7	(Italy) G Quinzi	2	3
(Argentina) P Cachin	6	6
Q	(Brazil) O Luz	2	1
(Argentina) F Argüello	6	6
5	(Bolivia) H Dellien	4	4

Quarterfinals
Q	(Chile) B Malla	4	2
(Bulgaria) D Kuzmanov	6	6
(Argentina) P Cachin	6	4	6
(Argentina) F Argüello	1	6	4

Semifinals
(Bulgaria) D Kuzmanov	3	6^{6}
(Argentina) P Cachin	6	7^{8}

=== Bottom half ===
First round
8	(Argentina) F Bagnis	4	6	6^{5}
(Uruguay) M Cuevas	6	4	7^{7}
(Serbia) M Zekić	3	2
(Brazil) G Clezar	6	6
Q	(Argentina) F Coria	6	6
(Romania) D Dima	2	1
(Portugal) J Domingues	4
4	(Portugal) P Sousa	3^{r}
6	(Argentina) C Berlocq	5	6^{1}
(Spain) M Vilella Martínez	7	7^{7}
WC	(Argentina) JP Ficovich	6	3	6^{4}
(Serbia) P Krstin	3	6	7^{7}
(Belgium) A De Greef	6	6
(Portugal) G Elias	4	3
WC	(Argentina) F Mena	2	1
2	(Spain) P Andújar	6	6

Second round
(Uruguay) M Cuevas	4	1
(Brazil) G Clezar	6	6
Q	(Argentina) F Coria	2	6	7
(Portugal) J Domingues	6	3	5
(Spain) M Vilella Martínez	5^{r}
(Serbia) P Krstin	5
(Belgium) A De Greef	1	2
2	(Spain) P Andújar	6	6

Quarterfinals
(Brazil) G Clezar	6^{5}	5
Q	(Argentina) F Coria	7^{7}	7
(Serbia) P Krstin	5	4
2	(Spain) P Andújar	7	6

Semifinals
Q	(Argentina) F Coria	6^{5}	5
2	(Spain) P Andújar	7^{7}	7
