= 2019 Challenger de Buenos Aires =

- Date: 23–29 September
- Edition: 9th
- Surface: Clay
- Location: Buenos Aires, Argentina

Champions

Singles
- (India) Sumit Nagal

Doubles
- (Argentina) Guido Andreozzi / (Argentina) Andrés Molteni
← 2018 ·	Challenger de Buenos Aires	· 2021 →

The 2019 Challenger de Buenos Aires was a professional tennis tournament played on clay courts. It was the ninth edition of the tournament which was part of the 2019 ATP Challenger Tour. It took place in Buenos Aires, Argentina between 23 and 29 September 2019.

== Singles main-draw entrants ==
=== Seeds ===
Country	Player	Rank^{1}	Seed
ARG	Federico Delbonis	71	1
BOL	Hugo Dellien	83	2
ARG	Leonardo Mayer	99	3
BRA	Thiago Monteiro	103	4
ARG	Guido Andreozzi	113	5
ARG	Federico Coria	153	6
IND	Sumit Nagal	159	7
ARG	Facundo Bagnis	164	8
ARG	Facundo Mena	195	9
BRA	João Menezes	202	10
ARG	Andrea Collarini	219	11
DOM	José Hernández-Fernández	260	12
ARG	Francisco Cerúndolo	263	13
ARG	Renzo Olivo	267	14
ARG	Matías Franco Descotte	296	15
BRA	Thiago Seyboth Wild	334	16

- ^{1} Rankings are as of September 16, 2019.

=== Other entrants ===
The following players received wildcards into the singles main draw:

- (Argentina) Sebastián Báez
- (Argentina) Román Andrés Burruchaga
- (Argentina) Juan Manuel Cerúndolo
- (Argentina) Facundo Díaz Acosta
- (Argentina) Thiago Agustín Tirante

The following player received entry into the singles main draw as an alternate:

- (Brazil) Rafael Matos

The following players received entry from the qualifying draw:

- (Argentina) Tomás Farjat
- (Bolivia) Federico Zeballos

== Champions ==
=== Singles ===
- (India) Sumit Nagal def. (Argentina) Facundo Bagnis 6–4, 6–2.

=== Doubles ===
- (Argentina) Guido Andreozzi / (Argentina) Andrés Molteni def. (Bolivia) Hugo Dellien / (Bolivia) Federico Zeballos 6–7^{(3–7)}, 6–2, [10–1].
