= 2022 Challenger de Buenos Aires =

- Date: 26 September – 2 October
- Edition: 11th
- Surface: Clay
- Location: Buenos Aires, Argentina

Champions

Singles
- (Argentina) Juan Manuel Cerúndolo

Doubles
- (Argentina) Guido Andreozzi / (Argentina) Guillermo Durán
← 2021 ·	Challenger de Buenos Aires	· 2023 →

The 2022 Challenger de Buenos Aires was a professional tennis tournament played on clay courts. It was the eleventh edition of the tournament which was part of the 2022 ATP Challenger Tour. It took place in Buenos Aires, Argentina between 26 September and 2 October 2022.

== Singles main-draw entrants ==
=== Seeds ===
Country	Player	Rank^{1}	Seed
ARG	Federico Coria	71	1
GER	Daniel Altmaier	97	2
~~PER~~	~~Juan Pablo Varillas~~	~~102~~	~~3~~
ARG	Camilo Ugo Carabelli	119	4
ARG	Facundo Bagnis	120	5
BRA	Felipe Meligeni Alves	144	6
ARG	Santiago Rodríguez Taverna	159	7
GER	Yannick Hanfmann	170	8

- ^{1} Rankings are as of 19 September 2022.

=== Other entrants ===
The following players received wildcards into the singles main draw:

- (Argentina) Román Andrés Burruchaga
- (Argentina) Lautaro Midón
- (Argentina) Juan Bautista Otegui

The following player received entry into the singles main draw using a protected ranking:

- (India) Sumit Nagal

The following player received entry into the singles main draw as a special exempt:

- (Argentina) Mariano Navone

The following players received entry into the singles main draw as alternates:

- (Argentina) Facundo Díaz Acosta
- (Argentina) Gonzalo Villanueva

The following players received entry from the qualifying draw:

- (Peru) Nicolás Álvarez
- (Argentina) Hernán Casanova
- (Argentina) Facundo Juárez
- (Brazil) Wilson Leite
- (Argentina) Ignacio Monzón
- (Brazil) Thiago Seyboth Wild

The following player received entry as a lucky loser:

- (Spain) Carlos Sánchez Jover

== Champions ==
=== Singles ===
- (Argentina) Juan Manuel Cerúndolo def. (Argentina) Camilo Ugo Carabelli 6–4, 2–6, 7–5.

=== Doubles ===
- (Argentina) Guido Andreozzi / (Argentina) Guillermo Durán def. (Argentina) Román Andrés Burruchaga / (Argentina) Facundo Díaz Acosta 6–0, 7–5.
