= 2010 Copa Topper – Doubles =

Doubles
- 2010 Copa Topper

Final
- Champions: (Argentina) Carlos Berlocq (Argentina) Brian Dabul
- Runners-up: (Argentina) Andrés Molteni (Argentina) Guido Pella
- Score: 7–6(4), 6–3

Events
Singles	Doubles
← 2009 ·	Copa Topper	· 2011 →

Carlos Berlocq and Brian Dabul became the first champions of this tournament. They defeated Andrés Molteni and Guido Pella 7–6(4), 6–3 in the final.

== Seeds ==
1. (Argentina) Carlos Berlocq / (Argentina) Brian Dabul (champions)
2. (Argentina) Diego Junqueira / (Spain) Rubén Ramírez Hidalgo (first round)
3. (Serbia) Nikola Ćirić / (Montenegro) Goran Tošić (quarterfinals)
4. (Brazil) Rodrigo Guidolin / (Brazil) Júlio Silva (semifinals)

== Draw ==
=== Key ===
- Q = Qualifier
- WC = Wild card
- LL = Lucky loser
- Alt = Alternate
- SE = Special exempt
- PR = Protected ranking
- ITF = ITF entry
- JE = Junior exempt
- w/o = Walkover
- r = Retired
- d = Defaulted
- SR = Special ranking

=== Draw ===
First round
1	(Argentina) C Berlocq (Argentina) B Dabul	7	0	[10]
(Argentina) D Cristín (Argentina) S Prieto	5	6	[7]
(Spain) Ó Burrieza (Spain) J Martí	6	6
WC	(Argentina) L Noviski (Argentina) M Trungelliti	3	2
3	(Serbia) N Ćirić (Montenegro) G Tošić	6	6
WC	(United States) A Collarini (Argentina) A Velotti	3	4
(Chile) J Aguilar (Argentina) P Galdón	6	5	[10]
PR	(Argentina) J Gonzalia (Argentina) D Hartfield	3	7	[6]
(Argentina) F Argüello (Argentina) DS Schwartzman	5	4
(Argentina) A Fabbri (Brazil) R Grilli	7	6
(Argentina) D Álvarez (Brazil) E Ribeiro Neto	6^{2}	2
4	(Brazil) R Guidolin (Brazil) J Silva	7	6
(Argentina) M Alund (Argentina) G Durán	6	5	[10]
WC	(Argentina) F Bagnis (Argentina) F Mena	2	7	[6]
(Argentina) A Molteni (Argentina) G Pella	7	6
2	(Argentina) D Junqueira (Spain) R Ramírez Hidalgo	6^{4}	1

Quarterfinals
1	(Argentina) C Berlocq (Argentina) B Dabul	6	7
(Spain) Ó Burrieza (Spain) J Martí	2	6^{2}
3	(Serbia) N Ćirić (Montenegro) G Tošić	6^{2}	5
(Chile) J Aguilar (Argentina) P Galdón	7	7
(Argentina) A Fabbri (Brazil) R Grilli	7	3	[8]
4	(Brazil) R Guidolin (Brazil) J Silva	5	6	[10]
(Argentina) M Alund (Argentina) G Durán	4	3
(Argentina) A Molteni (Argentina) G Pella	6	6

Semifinals
1	(Argentina) C Berlocq (Argentina) B Dabul	6	6
(Chile) J Aguilar (Argentina) P Galdón	4	2
4	(Brazil) R Guidolin (Brazil) J Silva	4	1
(Argentina) A Molteni (Argentina) G Pella	6	6

Final
1	(Argentina) C Berlocq (Argentina) B Dabul	7	6
(Argentina) A Molteni (Argentina) G Pella	6^{4}	3
