= 2011 Copa Topper – Singles =

Singles
- 2011 Copa Topper

Final
- Champion: (Argentina) Carlos Berlocq
- Runner-up: (Portugal) Gastão Elias
- Score: 6–1, 7–6^{(7–3)}

Events
Singles	Doubles
← 2010 ·	Copa Topper	· 2012 →

Diego Junqueira is the defending champion, but lost in the quarterfinals.
Carlos Berlocq won the title, defeating Gastão Elias 6–1, 7–6^{(7–3)} in the final.

== Seeds ==
1. (Argentina) Carlos Berlocq (champion)
2. (Portugal) Rui Machado (second round)
3. (Brazil) Ricardo Mello (second round)
4. (Argentina) Diego Junqueira (quarterfinals)
5. (Argentina) Leonardo Mayer (first round)
6. (Portugal) Frederico Gil (quarterfinals)
7. (Brazil) João Souza (first round)
8. (Chile) Paul Capdeville (second round)

== Draw ==
=== Key ===
- Q = Qualifier
- WC = Wild card
- LL = Lucky loser
- Alt = Alternate
- SE = Special exempt
- PR = Protected ranking
- ITF = ITF entry
- JE = Junior exempt
- w/o = Walkover
- r = Retired
- d = Defaulted
- SR = Special ranking

=== Finals ===
Semifinals
1	(Argentina) Carlos Berlocq	6	6
(Argentina) Máximo González	3	1
(Portugal) Gastão Elias	6	2
(Brazil) Júlio Silva	0	2r

Final
1	(Argentina) Carlos Berlocq	6	7^{7}
(Portugal) Gastão Elias	1	6^{3}

=== Top half ===
First round
1	(Argentina) C Berlocq	4	6	7^{7}
(France) G Rufin	6	4	6^{2}
Q	(Uruguay) M Felder	7	5	6
WC	(Argentina) Nicolás Pastor	6^{2}	7	1
(Italy) A Giannessi	2	6^{5}
(Argentina) F Bagnis	6	7^{7}
(Serbia) N Ćirić	6	4	2
8	(Chile) P Capdeville	3	6	6
4	(Argentina) D Junqueira	6	2	6
Q	(Russia) A Kuznetsov	1	6	4
(Italy) A di Mauro	6^{3}	6	6
Q	(Argentina) Leandro Migani	7^{7}	3	4
WC	(Argentina) F Argüello	7	6
(Argentina) A Molteni	5	1
(Argentina) M González	6	3	6
7	(Brazil) J Souza	4	6	1

Second round
1	(Argentina) C Berlocq	6	6
Q	(Uruguay) M Felder	2	0
(Argentina) F Bagnis	6	7
8	(Chile) P Capdeville	0	5
4	(Argentina) D Junqueira	6	6
(Italy) A di Mauro	2	1
WC	(Argentina) F Argüello	2	5
(Argentina) M González	6	7

Quarterfinals
1	(Argentina) C Berlocq	6	7
(Argentina) F Bagnis	4	5
4	(Argentina) D Junqueira	3	3
(Argentina) M González	6	6

Semifinals
1	(Argentina) C Berlocq	6	6
(Argentina) M González	3	1

=== Bottom half ===
First round
6	(Portugal) F Gil	6	7
WC	(Argentina) Marco Trungelliti	4	5
WC	(Argentina) A Velotti	6	1	6
(Brazil) R Dutra da Silva	4	6	3
(Portugal) G Elias	6	4	6
(Czech Republic) J Pospíšil	3	6	4
(Argentina) E Schwank	2	3
3	(Brazil) R Mello	6	6
5	(Argentina) L Mayer	4	6	6^{2}
(United States) W Odesnik	6	2	7^{7}
(Italy) G Naso	7	6
(Spain) P Carreño-Busta	5	1
Q	(Argentina) Diego Schwartzman	6	1	0
(Brazil) J Silva	2	6	6
SE	(Argentina) JP Brzezicki	0	3
2	(Portugal) R Machado	6	6

Second round
6	(Portugal) F Gil	6	6
WC	(Argentina) A Velotti	4	4
(Portugal) G Elias	6	4	7^{7}
3	(Brazil) R Mello	3	6	6^{4}
(United States) W Odesnik	6	6
(Italy) G Naso	4	4
(Brazil) J Silva	6	6
2	(Portugal) R Machado	4	0

Quarterfinals
6	(Portugal) F Gil	6	5	5
(Portugal) G Elias	1	7	7
(United States) W Odesnik	6^{5}	4
(Brazil) J Silva	7^{7}	6

Semifinals
(Portugal) G Elias	6	2
(Brazil) J Silva	0	2r
