= 2025 Challenger de Buenos Aires – Doubles =

Doubles
- 2025 Challenger de Buenos Aires

Final
- Champions: (Argentina) Guillermo Durán (Argentina) Mariano Kestelboim
- Runners-up: (Brazil) Pedro Boscardin Dias (Brazil) João Lucas Reis da Silva
- Score: 7–6^{(7–3)}, 6–1

Events
Singles	Doubles
- Challenger de Buenos Aires

Murkel Dellien and Facundo Mena were the defending champions but only Dellien chose to defend his title, partnering Boris Arias. They lost in the first round to Guillermo Durán and Mariano Kestelboim.

Durán and Kestelboim won the title after defeating Pedro Boscardin Dias and João Lucas Reis da Silva 7–6^{(7–3)}, 6–1 in the final.

== Seeds ==
1. (Ecuador) Gonzalo Escobar / (Mexico) Miguel Ángel Reyes-Varela (first round)
2. (Chile) Matías Soto / (Argentina) Gonzalo Villanueva (withdrew)
3. (Colombia) Cristian Rodríguez / (Bolivia) Federico Zeballos (first round)
4. (Bolivia) Boris Arias / (Bolivia) Murkel Dellien (first round)

== Draw ==
Key

- Q = Qualifier
- WC = Wild card
- LL = Lucky loser
- Alt = Alternate
- ITF = ITF entry
- PR = Protected ranking
- SR = Special ranking
- SE = Special exempt
- JE = Junior exempt
- JR = Junior Accelerator Programme entrant
- CO = College Accelerator Programme entrant
- NG = Next Gen Accelerator Program entrant
- w/o = Walkover
- r = Retired
- d = Defaulted

=== Draw ===
First round
1	(Ecuador) G Escobar (Mexico) M Reyes-Varela	3	6^{4}
(Uruguay) I Carou (Argentina) S Rodríguez Taverna	6	7^{7}
(Argentina) A Barrena (Argentina) H Casanova	4	6	[10]
(Peru) A Huertas del Pino (Uruguay) F Roncadelli	6	4	[7]
4	(Bolivia) B Arias (Bolivia) M Dellien	4	6	[3]
(Argentina) G Durán (Argentina) M Kestelboim	6	3	[10]
(Argentina) FA Gómez (Argentina) N Kicker	6	6^{7}	[14]
WC	(Argentina) Valentín Basel (Argentina) F Ribero	2	7^{9}	[12]
(Brazil) P Boscardin Dias (Brazil) JL Reis da Silva	7^{7}	6
3	(Colombia) C Rodríguez (Bolivia) F Zeballos	6^{3}	4
(Italy) F Maestrelli (Brazil) Bruno Oliveira	w/o
(Brazil) D Dutra da Silva (Brazil) M Pucinelli de Almeida
(Argentina) S de la Fuente (Argentina) GA Olivieri	6^{4}	0
Alt	(Argentina) LE Ambrogi (Argentina) L Midón	7^{7}	6

Quarterfinals
(Uruguay) I Carou (Argentina) S Rodríguez Taverna	2	2
(Argentina) A Barrena (Argentina) H Casanova	6	6
(Argentina) G Durán (Argentina) M Kestelboim	6	5	[15]
(Argentina) FA Gómez (Argentina) N Kicker	3	7	[13]
WC	(Argentina) Dante Pagani (Argentina) Ian Vertberger	6^{3}	2
(Brazil) P Boscardin Dias (Brazil) JL Reis da Silva	7^{7}	6
(Italy) F Maestrelli (Brazil) B Oliveira	7^{7}	5	[10]
Alt	(Argentina) LE Ambrogi (Argentina) L Midón	6^{5}	7	[8]

Semifinals
(Argentina) A Barrena (Argentina) H Casanova
(Argentina) G Durán (Argentina) M Kestelboim	w/o
(Brazil) P Boscardin Dias (Brazil) JL Reis da Silva	6	6
(Italy) F Maestrelli (Brazil) B Oliveira	2	2

Final
(Argentina) G Durán (Argentina) M Kestelboim	7^{7}	6
(Brazil) P Boscardin Dias (Brazil) JL Reis da Silva	6^{3}	1
