= 2023 Challenger de Buenos Aires =

- Date: 9 – 15 October
- Edition: 12th
- Surface: Clay
- Location: Buenos Aires, Argentina

Champions

Singles
- (Argentina) Mariano Navone

Doubles
- (Ecuador) Diego Hidalgo / (Colombia) Cristian Rodríguez
← 2022 ·	Challenger de Buenos Aires	· 2024 →

The 2023 Challenger de Buenos Aires was a professional tennis tournament played on clay courts. It was the 12th edition of the tournament which was part of the 2023 ATP Challenger Tour. It took place in Buenos Aires, Argentina between 9 and 15 October 2023.

== Singles main-draw entrants ==
=== Seeds ===
Country	Player	Rank^{1}	Seed
ARG	Federico Coria	83	1
ARG	Juan Manuel Cerúndolo	102	2
ARG	Facundo Díaz Acosta	106	3
CHI	Tomás Barrios Vera	108	4
CZE	Vít Kopřiva	114	5
CHI	Alejandro Tabilo	120	6
ARG	Francisco Comesaña	126	7
GBR	Jan Choinski	127	8

- ^{1} Rankings are as of 25 September 2023.

=== Other entrants ===
The following players received wildcards into the singles main draw:

- (Argentina) Román Andrés Burruchaga
- (Argentina) Federico Delbonis
- (Argentina) Juan Pablo Ficovich

The following player received entry into the singles main draw as a special exempt:

- (Italy) Andrea Pellegrino

The following player received entry into the singles main draw as an alternate:

- (Argentina) Guido Andreozzi

The following players received entry from the qualifying draw:

- (Bolivia) Murkel Dellien
- (Argentina) Renzo Olivo
- (Brazil) João Lucas Reis da Silva
- (Argentina) Juan Bautista Torres
- (Argentina) Marco Trungelliti
- (Argentina) Gonzalo Villanueva

The following player received entry as a lucky loser:

- (Portugal) Gastão Elias

== Champions ==
=== Singles ===
- (Argentina) Mariano Navone def. (Argentina) Federico Coria 2–6, 6–3, 6–4.

=== Doubles ===
- (Ecuador) Diego Hidalgo / (Colombia) Cristian Rodríguez def. (Brazil) Fernando Romboli / (Brazil) Marcelo Zormann 6–3, 6–2.
