= 2011 Copa Topper – Doubles =

Doubles
- 2011 Copa Topper

Final
- Champions: (Argentina) Carlos Berlocq (Argentina) Eduardo Schwank
- Runners-up: (Uruguay) Marcel Felder (Czech Republic) Jaroslav Pospíšil
- Score: 6–7^{(1–7)}, 6–4, [10–7]

Events
Singles	Doubles
← 2010 ·	Copa Topper	· 2012 →

Diego Junqueira and Brian Dabul were the defending champions but decided not to participate.
Carlos Berlocq and Eduardo Schwank won the title, defeating Marcel Felder and Jaroslav Pospíšil 6–7^{(1–7)}, 6–4, [10–7] in the final.

== Seeds ==
1. (Argentina) Carlos Berlocq / (Argentina) Eduardo Schwank (champions)
2. (Brazil) Franco Ferreiro / (Portugal) Leonardo Tavares (first round)
3. (Uruguay) Marcel Felder / (Czech Republic) Jaroslav Pospíšil (final)
4. (Brazil) Rogério Dutra da Silva / (Brazil) Júlio Silva (first round)

== Draw ==
=== Key ===
- Q = Qualifier
- WC = Wild card
- LL = Lucky loser
- Alt = Alternate
- SE = Special exempt
- PR = Protected ranking
- ITF = ITF entry
- JE = Junior exempt
- w/o = Walkover
- r = Retired
- d = Defaulted
- SR = Special ranking

=== Draw ===
First round
1	(Argentina) C Berlocq (Argentina) E Schwank	6	4	[10]
(France) A Michon (France) G Rufin	2	6	[5]
(Argentina) JP Brzezicki (Argentina) A Molteni	6	6
(Spain) P Carreño-Busta (Italy) A Giannessi	3	3
4	(Brazil) R Dutra da Silva (Brazil) J Silva	3	4
Alt	(Serbia) N Ćirić (Montenegro) G Tošić	6	6
Alt	(Argentina) J-M Aranguren (Russia) A Kuznetsov	w/o
(Slovakia) P Červenák (United States) W Odesnik
WC	(Argentina) F Mena (Argentina) R Olivo	6	3	[10]
(Portugal) G Elias (Portugal) F Gil	4	6	[7]
(Italy) A di Mauro (Italy) G Naso	4	6	[3]
3	(Uruguay) M Felder (Czech Republic) J Pospíšil	6	4	[10]
WC	(Argentina) G Andreozzi (Argentina) A Velotti	6	7^{7}
WC	(Argentina) F Argüello (Argentina) D Schwartzman	4	6^{4}
(Argentina) F Bagnis (Argentina) Nicolás Pastor	6	7^{7}
2	(Brazil) F Ferreiro (Portugal) L Tavares	4	6^{4}

Quarterfinals
1	(Argentina) C Berlocq (Argentina) E Schwank	7^{7}	3	[10]
(Argentina) JP Brzezicki (Argentina) A Molteni	6^{2}	6	[6]
Alt	(Serbia) N Ćirić (Montenegro) G Tošić	3	6	[10]
Alt	(Argentina) J-M Aranguren (Russia) A Kuznetsov	6	4	[7]
WC	(Argentina) F Mena (Argentina) R Olivo	6^{6}	6	[8]
3	(Uruguay) M Felder (Czech Republic) J Pospíšil	7^{8}	4	[10]
WC	(Argentina) G Andreozzi (Argentina) A Velotti	3	6	[7]
(Argentina) F Bagnis (Argentina) N Pastor	6	2	[10]

Semifinals
1	(Argentina) C Berlocq (Argentina) E Schwank	7	3	[10]
Alt	(Serbia) N Ćirić (Montenegro) G Tošić	5	6	[6]
3	(Uruguay) M Felder (Czech Republic) J Pospíšil	6	6
(Argentina) F Bagnis (Argentina) N Pastor	1	4

Final
1	(Argentina) C Berlocq (Argentina) E Schwank	6^{1}	6	[10]
3	(Uruguay) M Felder (Czech Republic) J Pospíšil	7^{7}	4	[7]
