= 2012 Copa Topper – Singles =

Singles
- 2012 Copa Topper

Final
- Champion: (Argentina) Diego Schwartzman
- Runner-up: (France) Guillaume Rufin
- Score: 6–1, 7–5

Events
Singles	Doubles
← 2011 ·	Copa Topper	· 2013 →

Carlos Berlocq was the defending champion but decided not to participate.
Diego Schwartzman defeated Guillaume Rufin 6–1, 7–5 in the final to win the title.

== Seeds ==
1. (Argentina) Leonardo Mayer (quarterfinals)
2. (Slovenia) Blaž Kavčič (second round)
3. (Argentina) Martín Alund (quarterfinals)
4. (France) Guillaume Rufin (final)
5. (Argentina) Horacio Zeballos (second round)
6. (Brazil) Rogério Dutra da Silva (quarterfinals)
7. (Portugal) Frederico Gil (first round)
8. (Argentina) Guido Andreozzi (second round, retired)

== Draw ==
=== Key ===
- Q = Qualifier
- WC = Wild card
- LL = Lucky loser
- Alt = Alternate
- SE = Special exempt
- PR = Protected ranking
- ITF = ITF entry
- JE = Junior exempt
- w/o = Walkover
- r = Retired
- d = Defaulted
- SR = Special ranking

=== Finals ===
Semifinals
(Argentina) Marco Trungelliti	5	0
4	(France) Guillaume Rufin	7	6
(Argentina) Diego Schwartzman	6	6
(Argentina) Agustín Velotti	3	1

Final
4	(France) Guillaume Rufin	1	5
(Argentina) Diego Schwartzman	6	7

=== Top half ===
First round
1	(Argentina) L Mayer	7	7
(Argentina) P Galdón	5	5
WC	(Argentina) R Olivo	7^{7}	3	7^{7}
(Spain) I Navarro	6^{3}	6	6^{5}
Q	(Netherlands) A van der Duim	6	3	6^{6}
(Argentina) M Trungelliti	2	6	7^{8}
Q	(Argentina) JI Londero	3	2
5	(Argentina) H Zeballos	6	6
4	(France) G Rufin	6	6
LL	(Montenegro) G Tošić	3	2
(Argentina) M González	3	6	1
(Argentina) F Argüello	6	3	6
Q	(Argentina) JM Aranguren	6	6
WC	(Argentina) T Lipovšek Puches	2	4
Q	(Germany) S Stadler	7^{7}	3	2
6	(Brazil) R Dutra da Silva	6^{4}	6	6

Second round
1	(Argentina) L Mayer	6	6
WC	(Argentina) R Olivo	2	1
(Argentina) M Trungelliti	6	6
5	(Argentina) H Zeballos	4	4
4	(France) G Rufin	6	6
(Argentina) F Argüello	3	0
Q	(Argentina) JM Aranguren	5	6	1
6	(Brazil) R Dutra da Silva	7	4	6

Quarterfinals
1	(Argentina) L Mayer	4	6	4
(Argentina) M Trungelliti	6	2	6
4	(France) G Rufin	4	6	6
6	(Brazil) R Dutra da Silva	6	2	2

Semifinals
(Argentina) M Trungelliti	5	0
4	(France) G Rufin	7	6

=== Bottom half ===
First round
7	(Portugal) F Gil	1	6	2
(Argentina) D Schwartzman	6	4	6
(Chile) J Aguilar	4	6^{5}
(Ecuador) JC Campozano	6	7^{7}
(Argentina) D Junqueira	4	6	6
(Spain) J Martí	6	4	4
(France) S Robert	6	4	3
3	(Argentina) M Alund	2	6	6
8	(Argentina) G Andreozzi	6	6^{3}	6
(Argentina) S Decoud	3	7^{7}	3
(Argentina) A Velotti	6	5	6
(Netherlands) B Westerhof	2	7	4
WC	(Argentina) A Collarini	4	3
(Argentina) Leandro Migani	6	6
(Argentina) F Bagnis	2	1
2	(Slovenia) B Kavčič	6	6

Second round
(Argentina) D Schwartzman	6	6
(Ecuador) JC Campozano	1	4
(Argentina) D Junqueira	2	2
3	(Argentina) M Alund	6	6
8	(Argentina) G Andreozzi	3	7	2^{r}
(Argentina) A Velotti	6	5	2
Alt	(Argentina) Leandro Migani	6	6
2	(Slovenia) B Kavčič	3	4

Quarterfinals
(Argentina) D Schwartzman	6	5	6
3	(Argentina) M Alund	4	7	2
(Argentina) A Velotti	6	6^{3}	6
Alt	(Argentina) Leandro Migani	2	7^{7}	0

Semifinals
(Argentina) D Schwartzman	6	6
(Argentina) A Velotti	3	1
