= 2010 Copa Topper – Singles =

Singles
- 2010 Copa Topper

Final
- Champion: (Argentina) Diego Junqueira
- Runner-up: (Argentina) Juan Pablo Brzezicki
- Score: 6–2, 6–1

Events
Singles	Doubles
← 2009 ·	Copa Topper	· 2011 →

Diego Junqueira won in the final 6–2, 6–1, against Juan Pablo Brzezicki.

== Seeds ==
1. (Argentina) Carlos Berlocq (semifinals)
2. (Spain) Rubén Ramírez Hidalgo (first round)
3. (Argentina) Brian Dabul (quarterfinals)
4. (Argentina) Horacio Zeballos (second round)
5. (Argentina) ~~Máximo González~~ (withdrew)
6. (Argentina) Diego Junqueira (champion)
7. (Chile) Jorge Aguilar (first round)
8. (Brazil) Júlio Silva (quarterfinals)

== Draw ==
=== Key ===
- Q = Qualifier
- WC = Wild card
- LL = Lucky loser
- Alt = Alternate
- SE = Special exempt
- PR = Protected ranking
- ITF = ITF entry
- JE = Junior exempt
- w/o = Walkover
- r = Retired
- d = Defaulted
- SR = Special ranking

=== Finals ===
Semifinals
1	(Argentina) Carlos Berlocq	6^{4}	2
6	(Argentina) Diego Junqueira	7	6
(Argentina) Juan Pablo Brzezicki	6	6
(Argentina) Andrés Molteni	2	4

Final
6	(Argentina) Diego Junqueira	6	6
(Argentina) Juan Pablo Brzezicki	2	1

=== Top half ===
First round
1	(Argentina) C Berlocq	4	6	6
(Argentina) S Decoud	6	3	4
Q	(Argentina) A Fabbri	6	6
Q	(Argentina) M Estévez	3	3
Q	(Brazil) R Camilo	3	4
(Serbia) N Ćirić	6	6
WC	(Argentina) M Trungelliti	4	6	2
LL	(Argentina) G Durán	6	4	6
3	(Argentina) B Dabul	6	6
(Argentina) J Acasuso	3	0
WC	(Argentina) G Bujniewicz	3	5
(Argentina) G Pella	6	7
(Argentina) F Argüello	6	6
(Spain) J Martí	4	4
(Montenegro) G Tošić	1	1
6	(Argentina) D Junqueira	6	6

Second round
1	(Argentina) C Berlocq	6	6
Q	(Argentina) A Fabbri	2	2
(Serbia) N Ćirić	6	6
LL	(Argentina) G Durán	3	4
3	(Argentina) B Dabul	6	6
(Argentina) G Pella	1	0
(Argentina) F Argüello	6^{5}	r
6	(Argentina) D Junqueira	7

Quarterfinals
1	(Argentina) C Berlocq	3	6	6
(Serbia) N Ćirić	6	3	3
3	(Argentina) B Dabul	4	6	4
6	(Argentina) D Junqueira	6	2	6

Semifinals
1	(Argentina) C Berlocq	6^{4}	2
6	(Argentina) D Junqueira	7	6

=== Bottom half ===
First round
7	(Chile) J Aguilar	6	6^{2}	1
(Brazil) E Ribeiro Neto	4	7	6
(Argentina) M Alund	6	3	4
(Brazil) L Kirche	4	6	6
(Argentina) P Galdón	3	6	4
(Argentina) JP Brzezicki	6	2	6
WC	(Argentina) A Velotti	1	2
4	(Argentina) H Zeballos	6	6
8	(Brazil) J Silva	4	6	6
(Argentina) F Bagnis	6	1	2
LL	(Brazil) R Guidolin	3	6	6
WC	(Argentina) DS Schwartzman	6	2	3
Q	(Argentina) J Gonzalia	6^{2}	4
(Argentina) A Molteni	7	6
PR	(Argentina) D Hartfield	6	6
2	(Spain) R Ramírez Hidalgo	1	3

Second round
(Brazil) E Ribeiro Neto	6	6
(Brazil) L Kirche	4	3
(Argentina) JP Brzezicki	6	6
4	(Argentina) H Zeballos	2	1
8	(Brazil) J Silva	6	6^{4}	6
LL	(Brazil) R Guidolin	4	7	2
(Argentina) A Molteni	6	6
PR	(Argentina) D Hartfield	1	2

Quarterfinals
(Brazil) E Ribeiro Neto	5	3
(Argentina) JP Brzezicki	7	6
8	(Brazil) J Silva	2	7	3
(Argentina) A Molteni	6	6^{5}	6

Semifinals
(Argentina) JP Brzezicki	6	6
(Argentina) A Molteni	2	4
