= 2019 Challenger de Buenos Aires – Singles =

Singles
- 2019 Challenger de Buenos Aires

Final
- Champion: (India) Sumit Nagal
- Runner-up: (Argentina) Facundo Bagnis
- Score: 6–4, 6–2

Events
Singles	Doubles
← 2018 ·	Challenger de Buenos Aires	· 2021 →

Pablo Andújar was the defending champion but chose not to defend his title.

Sumit Nagal won the title after defeating Facundo Bagnis 6–4, 6–2 in the final.

== Seeds ==
All seeds receive a bye into the second round.

1. (Argentina) Federico Delbonis (second round)
2. (Bolivia) Hugo Dellien (second round)
3. (Argentina) Leonardo Mayer (semifinals)
4. (Brazil) Thiago Monteiro (semifinals)
5. (Argentina) Guido Andreozzi (third round)
6. (Argentina) Federico Coria (second round)
7. (India) Sumit Nagal (champion)
8. (Argentina) Facundo Bagnis (final)
9. (Argentina) Facundo Mena (second round)
10. (Brazil) João Menezes (second round)
11. (Argentina) Andrea Collarini (quarterfinals)
12. (Dominican Republic) José Hernández-Fernández (third round)
13. (Argentina) Francisco Cerúndolo (quarterfinals)
14. (Argentina) Renzo Olivo (second round)
15. (Argentina) Matías Franco Descotte (second round)
16. (Brazil) Thiago Seyboth Wild (third round)

== Draw ==
=== Key ===
- Q = Qualifier
- WC = Wild card
- LL = Lucky loser
- Alt = Alternate
- SE = Special exempt
- PR = Protected ranking
- ITF = ITF entry
- JE = Junior exempt
- w/o = Walkover
- r = Retired
- d = Defaulted
- SR = Special ranking

=== Finals ===
Quarterfinals
(Argentina) Agustín Velotti	3	6^{1}
8	(Argentina) Facundo Bagnis	6	7^{7}
3	(Argentina) Leonardo Mayer	6	6^{3}	7^{7}
(Argentina) Juan Pablo Ficovich	1	7^{7}	6^{5}
11	(Argentina) Andrea Collarini	6	1	5
4	(Brazil) Thiago Monteiro	3	6	7
7	(India) Sumit Nagal	6	4	6
13	(Argentina) Francisco Cerúndolo	3	6	4

Semifinals
8	(Argentina) Facundo Bagnis	6	3	6
3	(Argentina) Leonardo Mayer	2	6	3
4	(Brazil) Thiago Monteiro	0	1
7	(India) Sumit Nagal	6	6

Final
8	(Argentina) Facundo Bagnis	4	2
7	(India) Sumit Nagal	6	6

=== Top half ===
==== Section 1 ====
First round
(Argentina) Maximiliano Estévez	0	2
(Argentina) A Velotti	6	6
(Peru) N Álvarez	6	6
WC	(Argentina) JM Cerúndolo	3	0
(Portugal) G Elias	4	0^{r}
(Brazil) F Meligeni Alves	6	3
(Chile) Bastián Malla	6^{10}	4
(Uruguay) M Cuevas	7^{12}	6

Second round
1	(Argentina) F Delbonis	4	3
(Argentina) A Velotti	6	6
(Peru) N Álvarez	4	4
16	(Brazil) T Seyboth Wild	6	6
9	(Argentina) F Mena	6^{0}	2
(Brazil) F Meligeni Alves	7^{7}	6
(Uruguay) M Cuevas	4	2
8	(Argentina) F Bagnis	6	6

Third round
(Argentina) A Velotti	7^{8}	1	6
16	(Brazil) T Seyboth Wild	6^{6}	6	3
(Brazil) F Meligeni Alves	4	1
8	(Argentina) F Bagnis	6	6

Quarterfinals
(Argentina) A Velotti	3	6^{1}
8	(Argentina) F Bagnis	6	7^{7}

==== Section 2 ====
First round
Q	(Bolivia) F Zeballos	6	6
(Argentina) G Villanueva	4	1
(Argentina) M Kestelboim	3	7	5
WC	(Argentina) F Díaz Acosta	6	5	7
(Brazil) O Luz	2	6^{6}
(Argentina) JP Ficovich	6	7^{8}
(Argentina) Matías Zukas	6	6^{5}	2
(Argentina) C Ugo Carabelli	4	7^{7}	6

Second round
3	(Argentina) L Mayer	7	6
Q	(Bolivia) F Zeballos	5	1
WC	(Argentina) F Díaz Acosta	7	4	6
14	(Argentina) R Olivo	5	6	2
10	(Brazil) J Menezes	6	5	5
(Argentina) JP Ficovich	2	7	7
(Argentina) C Ugo Carabelli	6	6
6	(Argentina) F Coria	4	4

Third round
3	(Argentina) L Mayer	7^{10}	6
WC	(Argentina) F Díaz Acosta	6^{8}	3
(Argentina) JP Ficovich	7	6
(Argentina) C Ugo Carabelli	5	4

Quarterfinals
3	(Argentina) L Mayer	6	6^{3}	7^{7}
(Argentina) JP Ficovich	1	7^{7}	6^{5}

=== Bottom half ===
==== Section 3 ====
First round
(Argentina) GA Olivieri	6	6
(Brazil) Oscar José Gutierrez	4	4
(Brazil) Jordan Correia	2	0
(Spain) P Toledo Bagué	6	6
WC	(Argentina) RA Burruchaga	4	2
(Sweden) C Lindell	6	6
WC	(Argentina) TA Tirante	6	7
Alt	(Brazil) R Matos	4	5

Second round
5	(Argentina) G Andreozzi	7^{9}	2	6
(Argentina) GA Olivieri	6^{7}	6	3
(Spain) P Toledo Bagué	4	5
11	(Argentina) A Collarini	6	7
15	(Argentina) MF Descotte	4	4
(Sweden) C Lindell	6	6
WC	(Argentina) TA Tirante	1	2
4	(Brazil) T Monteiro	6	6

Third round
5	(Argentina) G Andreozzi	4	4
11	(Argentina) A Collarini	6	6
(Sweden) C Lindell	6^{6}	6^{4}
4	(Brazil) T Monteiro	7^{8}	7^{7}

Quarterfinals
11	(Argentina) A Collarini	6	1	5
4	(Brazil) T Monteiro	3	6	7

==== Section 4 ====
First round
WC	(Argentina) S Báez	7^{7}	2	6^{3}
(Brazil) P Sakamoto	6^{5}	6	7^{7}
(Brazil) G Clezar	1	3
(Argentina) H Casanova	6	6
(Argentina) TM Etcheverry	3	6^{11}
(France) M Hamou	6	7^{13}
(Peru) JP Varillas	6	6
Q	(Argentina) Tomás Farjat	2	3

Second round
7	(India) S Nagal	6^{2}	6	6
(Brazil) P Sakamoto	7^{7}	4	3
(Argentina) H Casanova	5	2
12	(Dominican Republic) J Hernández-Fernández	7	6
13	(Argentina) F Cerúndolo	6	6
(France) M Hamou	2	1
(Peru) JP Varillas	6	6
2	(Bolivia) H Dellien	4	2

Third round
7	(India) S Nagal	6	3	6
12	(Dominican Republic) J Hernández-Fernández	3	6	4
13	(Argentina) F Cerúndolo	7^{7}	6
(Peru) JP Varillas	6^{3}	3

Quarterfinals
7	(India) S Nagal	6	4	6
13	(Argentina) F Cerúndolo	3	6	4
