= 2012 Copa Topper – Doubles =

Doubles
- 2012 Copa Topper

Final
- Champions: (Argentina) Martín Alund; (Argentina) Horacio Zeballos
- Runners-up: (Argentina) Facundo Argüello; (Argentina) Agustín Velotti
- Score: 7–6^{(8–6)}, 6–2

Events
Singles	Doubles
← 2011 ·	Copa Topper	· 2013 →

Carlos Berlocq and Eduardo Schwank were the defending champions but decided not to participate.
Martín Alund and Horacio Zeballos and defeated Facundo Argüello and Agustín Velotti 7–6^{(8–6)}, 6–2 in the final.

== Seeds ==
1. (United States) Nicholas Monroe / (Germany) Simon Stadler (semifinals)
2. (Argentina) Martín Alund / (Argentina) Horacio Zeballos (champions)
3. (Argentina) Guido Andreozzi / (Uruguay) Marcel Felder (withdrew)
4. (Montenegro) Goran Tošić / (United States) Denis Zivkovic (quarterfinals)

== Draw ==
=== Key ===
- Q = Qualifier
- WC = Wild card
- LL = Lucky loser
- Alt = Alternate
- ITF = ITF entry
- PR = Protected ranking
- SR = Special ranking
- SE = Special exempt
- JE = Junior exempt
- JR = Junior Accelerator Programme entrant
- CO = College Accelerator Programme entrant
- NG = Next Gen Accelerator Program entrant
- w/o = Walkover
- r = Retired
- d = Defaulted

=== Draw ===
First round

Quarterfinals

Semifinals

Final

1
- (United States) N Monroe
- (Germany) S Stadler
6
6

WC
- (Argentina) G Durán
- (Argentina) D Junqueira
1
2

1
- (United States) N Monroe
- (Germany) S Stadler
6
6

WC
- (Argentina) L Arnold Ker
- (Argentina) F Mena
7
6

WC
- (Argentina) L Arnold Ker
- (Argentina) F Mena
2
4

- (Netherlands) A van der Duim
- (Netherlands) B Westerhof
5
1

1
- (United States) N Monroe
- (Germany) S Stadler
2
6
[7]

Alt
(Argentina) Luciano Doria
(Argentina) Juan Cruz Estevarena
2
2

- (Argentina) F Argüello
- (Argentina) A Velotti
6
2
[10]

- (Argentina) F Argüello
- (Argentina) A Velotti
6
6

- (Argentina) F Argüello
- (Argentina) A Velotti
6
6

- (France) S Robert
- (France) G Rufin
2
4

- (Chile) J Aguilar
- (Uruguay) A Behar
1
3

- (Chile) J Aguilar
- (Uruguay) A Behar
6
6

- (Argentina) F Argüello
- (Argentina) A Velotti
6^{6}
2

WC
(Argentina) JI Londero
(Argentina) Juan Vazquez-Valenzuela
4
6
[10]

2
- (Argentina) M Alund
- (Argentina) H Zeballos
7^{8}
6

- (Argentina) A Collarini
- (Argentina) R Olivo
6
2
[12]

- (Argentina) A Collarini
- (Argentina) R Olivo
7^{7}
6

- (Spain) J Martí
- (Spain) I Navarro
2
3

4
- (Montenegro) G Tošić
- (United States) D Zivkovic
6^{4}
1

4
- (Montenegro) G Tošić
- (United States) D Zivkovic
6
6

- (Argentina) A Collarini
- (Argentina) R Olivo
1
4

- (Argentina) F Bagnis
- (Argentina) D Schwartzman
7^{7}
6

2
- (Argentina) M Alund
- (Argentina) H Zeballos
6
6

Alt
- (Argentina) JM Aranguren
- (Argentina) T Lipovšek Puches
6^{5}
4

- (Argentina) F Bagnis
- (Argentina) D Schwartzman
2
2

- (Ecuador) JC Campozano
- (Portugal) F Gil
4
4

2
- (Argentina) M Alund
- (Argentina) H Zeballos
6
6

2
- (Argentina) M Alund
- (Argentina) H Zeballos
6
6
