= 2022 Challenger de Buenos Aires – Doubles =

Doubles
- 2022 Challenger de Buenos Aires

Final
- Champions: (Argentina) Guido Andreozzi (Argentina) Guillermo Durán
- Runners-up: (Argentina) Román Andrés Burruchaga (Argentina) Facundo Díaz Acosta
- Score: 6–0, 7–5

Events
Singles	Doubles
- Challenger de Buenos Aires

Luciano Darderi and Juan Bautista Torres were the defending champions but only Torres chose to defend his title, partnering Thiago Agustín Tirante. Torres lost in the semifinals to Román Andrés Burruchaga and Facundo Díaz Acosta.

Guido Andreozzi and Guillermo Durán won the title after defeating Burruchaga and Díaz Acosta 6–0, 7–5 in the final.

== Seeds ==
1. (Bolivia) Boris Arias / (Bolivia) Federico Zeballos (first round)
2. (Argentina) Guido Andreozzi / (Argentina) Guillermo Durán (champions)
3. (Argentina) Hernán Casanova / (Argentina) Santiago Rodríguez Taverna (first round)
4. (Argentina) Román Andrés Burruchaga / (Argentina) Facundo Díaz Acosta (final)

== Draw ==
Key

- Q = Qualifier
- WC = Wild card
- LL = Lucky loser
- Alt = Alternate
- ITF = ITF entry
- PR = Protected ranking
- SR = Special ranking
- SE = Special exempt
- JE = Junior exempt
- JR = Junior Accelerator Programme entrant
- CO = College Accelerator Programme entrant
- NG = Next Gen Accelerator Program entrant
- w/o = Walkover
- r = Retired
- d = Defaulted

First round
1	(Bolivia) B Arias (Bolivia) F Zeballos	6^{5}	1
WC	(Argentina) Leonardo Aboian (Argentina) S de la Fuente	7^{7}	6
(Argentina) TA Tirante (Argentina) JB Torres	4	6	[10]
(Kazakhstan) D Popko (Brazil) T Seyboth Wild	6	0	[3]
4	(Argentina) RA Burruchaga (Argentina) F Díaz Acosta	6	6
WC	(Argentina) Juan Ignacio Galarza (Argentina) T Lipovšek Puches	3	1
Alt	(Argentina) Juan Bautista Otegui (Argentina) G Villanueva	1	1
(Uruguay) I Carou (Argentina) C Ugo Carabelli	6	6
(Argentina) Facundo Juárez (Spain) P Martín Tiffon	6^{5}	3
(Peru) A Merino (Switzerland) J Paul	7^{7}	6
PR	(Brazil) D Dutra da Silva (Brazil) P Sakamoto	6^{1}	6	[10]
3	(Argentina) H Casanova (Argentina) S Rodríguez Taverna	7^{7}	1	[6]
(Argentina) Ignacio Monzón (Argentina) GA Olivieri	3	7^{8}	[7]
(Argentina) A Collarini (Argentina) JP Paz	6	6^{6}	[10]
(Argentina) MF Descotte (Argentina) M Navone	5	4
2	(Argentina) G Andreozzi (Argentina) G Durán	7	6

Quarterfinals
WC	(Argentina) L Aboian (Argentina) S de la Fuente	6^{2}	6^{4}
(Argentina) TA Tirante (Argentina) JB Torres	7^{7}	7^{7}
4	(Argentina) RA Burruchaga (Argentina) F Díaz Acosta	7^{7}	7^{7}
(Uruguay) I Carou (Argentina) C Ugo Carabelli	6^{1}	6^{5}
(Peru) A Merino (Switzerland) J Paul	6	6
PR	(Brazil) D Dutra da Silva (Brazil) P Sakamoto	2	3
(Argentina) A Collarini (Argentina) JP Paz	4	3
2	(Argentina) G Andreozzi (Argentina) G Durán	6	6

Semifinals
(Argentina) TA Tirante (Argentina) JB Torres	6^{4}	6	[5]
4	(Argentina) RA Burruchaga (Argentina) F Díaz Acosta	7^{7}	2	[10]
(Peru) A Merino (Switzerland) J Paul	3	3
2	(Argentina) G Andreozzi (Argentina) G Durán	6	6

Final
4	(Argentina) RA Burruchaga (Argentina) F Díaz Acosta	0	5
2	(Argentina) G Andreozzi (Argentina) G Durán	6	7
