= 2015 Copa Fila =

- Date: 9–15 November
- Edition: 5th
- Surface: Clay
- Location: Buenos Aires, Argentina

Champions

Singles
- (United Kingdom) Kyle Edmund

Doubles
- (Chile) Julio Peralta / (Argentina) Horacio Zeballos
← 2013 ·	Copa Fila	· 2016 →

The 2015 Copa Fila was a professional tennis tournament played on clay courts. It was the fifth edition of the tournament which was part of the 2015 ATP Challenger Tour. It took place in Buenos Aires, Argentina between 9 and 15 November 2015.

== Singles main-draw entrants ==
=== Seeds ===
Country	Player	Rank^{1}	Seed
ARG	Federico Delbonis	54	1
ARG	Guido Pella	75	2
ARG	Diego Schwartzman	77	3
BIH	Damir Džumhur	81	4
GBR	Kyle Edmund	107	5
BRA	Rogério Dutra da Silva	120	6
ARG	Facundo Argüello	124	7
ARG	Carlos Berlocq	126	8

- ^{1} Rankings are as of November 2, 2015.

=== Other entrants ===
The following players received wildcards into the singles main draw:

- (Argentina) Guido Andreozzi
- (Argentina) Juan Ignacio Londero
- (Argentina) Facundo Mena
- (Argentina) Tomás Lipovšek Puches

The following players received entry from the qualifying draw:

- (Argentina) Andrea Collarini
- (Uruguay) Martín Cuevas
- (Chile) Cristian Garín
- (Brazil) Thiago Monteiro

The following player received entry as a lucky loser:

- (Bolivia) Hugo Dellien

== Champions ==
=== Singles ===
- (United Kingdom) Kyle Edmund def. (Argentina) Carlos Berlocq 6–0, 6–4

=== Doubles ===
- (Chile) Julio Peralta / (Argentina) Horacio Zeballos def. (Argentina) Guido Andreozzi / (Argentina) Lukas Arnold Ker 6–2, 7–5
