= 2018 Challenger de Buenos Aires =

- Date: 12–18 November
- Edition: 8th
- Surface: Clay
- Location: Buenos Aires, Argentina

Champions

Singles
- (Spain) Pablo Andújar

Doubles
- (Argentina) Guido Andreozzi / (Argentina) Guillermo Durán
← 2017 ·	Challenger de Buenos Aires	· 2019 →

The 2018 Challenger de Buenos Aires was a professional tennis tournament played on clay courts. It was the eighth edition of the tournament which was part of the 2018 ATP Challenger Tour. It took place in Buenos Aires, Argentina between 12 and 18 November 2018.

== Singles main-draw entrants ==
=== Seeds ===
Country	Player	Rank^{1}	Seed
ARG	Guido Andreozzi	82	1
ESP	Pablo Andújar	101	2
BRA	Thiago Monteiro	112	3
POR	Pedro Sousa	114	4
BOL	Hugo Dellien	117	5
ARG	Carlos Berlocq	127	6
ITA	Gianluigi Quinzi	149	7
ARG	Facundo Bagnis	150	8

- ^{1} Rankings are as of November 5, 2018.

=== Other entrants ===
The following players received wildcards into the singles main draw:

- (Argentina) Francisco Cerúndolo
- (Argentina) Juan Pablo Ficovich
- (Argentina) Facundo Mena
- (Argentina) Renzo Olivo

The following player received entry into the singles main draw as an alternate:

- (Argentina) Andrea Collarini

The following players received entry from the qualifying draw:

- (Argentina) Federico Coria
- (Brazil) Orlando Luz
- (Chile) Bastián Malla
- (Argentina) Gonzalo Villanueva

== Champions ==
=== Singles ===
- (Spain) Pablo Andújar def. (Argentina) Pedro Cachin 6–3, 6–1.

=== Doubles ===
- (Argentina) Guido Andreozzi / (Argentina) Guillermo Durán def. (Brazil) Marcelo Demoliner / (Argentina) Andrés Molteni 6–4, 4–6, [10–3].
