= 2016 Copa Fila =

- Date: 10–16 October
- Edition: 6th
- Surface: Clay
- Location: Buenos Aires, Argentina

Champions

Singles
- (Argentina) Renzo Olivo

Doubles
- (Chile) Julio Peralta / (Argentina) Horacio Zeballos
← 2015 ·	Copa Fila	· 2017 →

The 2016 Copa Fila was a professional tennis tournament played on clay courts. It was the sixth edition of the tournament which was part of the 2016 ATP Challenger Tour. It took place in Buenos Aires, Argentina between 10 and 16 October 2016.

== Singles main-draw entrants ==
=== Seeds ===
Country	Player	Rank^{1}	Seed
ARG	Horacio Zeballos	72	1
ARG	Facundo Bagnis	74	2
ARG	Carlos Berlocq	75	3
BRA	Thiago Monteiro	90	4
ARG	Renzo Olivo	100	5
BRA	Rogério Dutra da Silva	104	6
ARG	Leonardo Mayer	128	7
ARG	Guido Andreozzi	129	8

- ^{1} Rankings are as of October 3, 2016.

=== Other entrants ===
The following players received wildcards into the singles main draw:

- (Argentina) Camilo Ugo Carabelli
- (Argentina) Mariano Kestelboim
- (Argentina) Facundo Mena

The following players received entry from the qualifying draw:

- (Brazil) Daniel Dutra da Silva
- (Brazil) Pedro Sakamoto
- (Brazil) Bruno Sant'Anna
- (Brazil) Marcelo Zormann

The following players entered as lucky losers:

- (Argentina) Gabriel Alejandro Hidalgo
- (Brazil) João Pedro Sorgi

== Champions ==
=== Singles ===
- (Argentina) Renzo Olivo def. (Argentina) Leonardo Mayer, 4–6, 7–6^{(7–3)}, 7–6^{(7–3)}.

=== Doubles ===
- (Chile) Julio Peralta / (Argentina) Horacio Zeballos def. (Peru) Sergio Galdós / (Brazil) Fernando Romboli, 7–6^{(7–5)}, 7–6^{(7–1)}.
