= 2013 Copa Topper =

Professional tennis tournament in Argentina

- Date: 21–27 October
- Edition: 4th
- Surface: Clay
- Location: Buenos Aires, Argentina

Champions

Singles
- (Uruguay) Pablo Cuevas

Doubles
- (Argentina) Máximo González / (Argentina) Diego Sebastián Schwartzman
← 2012 ·	Copa Topper	· 2015 →

The 2013 Copa Topper was a professional tennis tournament played on clay courts. It was the fourth edition of the tournament which was part of the 2013 ATP Challenger Tour. It took place in Buenos Aires, Argentina between 21 and 27 October 2013.

== Singles main draw entrants ==
=== Seeds ===
Country	Player	Rank^{1}	Seed
ARG	Guido Pella	93	1
ARG	Diego Sebastián Schwartzman	107	2
COL	Alejandro González	111	3
BRA	Thomaz Bellucci	119	4
POR	Gastão Elias	125	5
BRA	Rogério Dutra da Silva	127	6
ESP	Pere Riba	133	7
BRA	João Souza	134	8

- ^{1} Rankings are as of October 14, 2013.

=== Other entrants ===
The following players received wildcards into the singles main draw:

- (Argentina) Pedro Cachin
- (Uruguay) Pablo Cuevas
- (Argentina) Andrés Molteni
- (Argentina) Eduardo Schwank

The following players received entry from the qualifying draw:

- (Argentina) Andrea Collarini
- (Argentina) Federico Coria
- (Argentina) Gabriel Alejandro Hidalgo
- (Portugal) Pedro Sousa

== Champions ==
=== Singles ===
- (Uruguay) Pablo Cuevas def. (Argentina) Facundo Argüello 7–6^{(8–6)}, 2–6, 6–4

=== Doubles ===
- (Argentina) Máximo González / (Argentina) Diego Sebastián Schwartzman def. (Brazil) Rogério Dutra da Silva / (Brazil) André Ghem 6–3, 7–5
