= 2025 Challenger de Buenos Aires =

- Date: 22 – 28 September
- Edition: 14th
- Surface: Clay
- Location: Buenos Aires, Argentina

Champions

Singles
- (Argentina) Román Andrés Burruchaga

Doubles
- (Argentina) Guillermo Durán / (Argentina) Mariano Kestelboim
- Challenger de Buenos Aires

The 2025 YPF Buenos Aires Challenger was a professional tennis tournament played on clay courts. It was the 14th edition of the tournament which was part of the 2025 ATP Challenger Tour. It took place in Buenos Aires, Argentina between 22 and 28 September 2025.

== Singles main-draw entrants ==
=== Seeds ===
Country	Player	Rank^{1}	Seed
ARG	Thiago Agustín Tirante	94	1
USA	Emilio Nava	100	2
BOL	Hugo Dellien	124	3
CHI	Cristian Garín	126	4
ARG	Juan Pablo Ficovich	132	5
ARG	Román Andrés Burruchaga	146	6
ITA	Francesco Maestrelli	159	7
LBN	Hady Habib	172	8

- ^{1} Rankings are as of 15 September 2025.

=== Other entrants ===
The following players received wildcards into the singles main draw:

- (Argentina) Facundo Bagnis
- (Argentina) Guido Iván Justo
- (Argentina) Juan Bautista Torres

The following players received entry into the singles main draw as alternates:

- (Argentina) Nicolás Kicker
- (Brazil) Matheus Pucinelli de Almeida

The following players received entry from the qualifying draw:

- (Argentina) Luciano Emanuel Ambrogi
- (Argentina) Hernán Casanova
- (Brazil) Daniel Dutra da Silva
- (Argentina) Lorenzo Joaquín Rodríguez
- (Peru) Juan Pablo Varillas
- (Argentina) Gonzalo Villanueva

== Champions ==
=== Singles ===
- (Argentina) Román Andrés Burruchaga def. (Argentina) Alex Barrena 7–6^{(7–4)}, 6–3.

=== Doubles ===
- (Argentina) Guillermo Durán / (Argentina) Mariano Kestelboim def. (Brazil) Pedro Boscardin Dias / (Brazil) João Lucas Reis da Silva 7–6^{(7–3)}, 6–1.
