= 2013 Copa Topper – Singles =

Singles
- 2013 Copa Topper

Final
- Champion: (Uruguay) Pablo Cuevas
- Runner-up: (Argentina) Facundo Argüello
- Score: 7–6^{(8–6)}, 2–6, 6–4

Events
Singles	Doubles
← 2012 ·	Copa Topper	· 2014 →

Diego Sebastián Schwartzman was the defending champion, but lost to Martín Alund during the second round. Uruguayan wild card Pablo Cuevas won the title over Argentinian Facundo Argüello, 7–6^{(8–6)}, 2–6, 6–4.

== Seeds ==
1. (Argentina) Guido Pella (second round)
2. (Argentina) Diego Sebastián Schwartzman (first round)
3. (Colombia) Alejandro González (second round)
4. (Brazil) Thomaz Bellucci (first round)
5. (Portugal) Gastão Elias (first round)
6. (Brazil) Rogério Dutra da Silva (second round)
7. (Spain) Pere Riba (first round)
8. (Brazil) João Souza (first round)

== Draw ==
=== Key ===
- Q = Qualifier
- WC = Wild card
- LL = Lucky loser
- Alt = Alternate
- SE = Special exempt
- PR = Protected ranking
- ITF = ITF entry
- JE = Junior exempt
- w/o = Walkover
- r = Retired
- d = Defaulted
- SR = Special ranking

=== Finals ===
Semifinals
(Argentina) Guido Andreozzi	6^{0}	6	3
WC	(Uruguay) Pablo Cuevas	7^{7}	4	6
(Canada) Steven Diez	1	3
(Argentina) Facundo Argüello	6	6

Final
WC	(Uruguay) Pablo Cuevas	7^{8}	2	6
(Argentina) Facundo Argüello	6^{6}	6	4

=== Top half ===
First round
1	(Argentina) G Pella	4	7^{7}	6
(Argentina) M González	6	6^{4}	4
(Argentina) G Andreozzi	6	6
(Argentina) R Olivo	2	4
WC	(Argentina) E Schwank	6	6
Q	(Argentina) A Collarini	2	4
WC	(Argentina) A Molteni	5	6^{2}
6	(Brazil) R Dutra da Silva	7	7^{7}
4	(Brazil) T Bellucci	3	4
WC	(Uruguay) P Cuevas	6	6
Q	(Argentina) F Coria	7^{8}	6
(Argentina) F Bagnis	6^{6}	4
(Brazil) G Clezar	4	3
(Croatia) K Mesaroš	6	6
(Spain) R Ramírez Hidalgo	6	6^{2}	6
7	(Spain) P Riba	4	7^{7}	3

Second round
1	(Argentina) G Pella	5	5
(Argentina) G Andreozzi	7	7
WC	(Argentina) E Schwank	6	1	6
6	(Brazil) R Dutra da Silva	4	6	4
WC	(Uruguay) P Cuevas	6	6
Q	(Argentina) F Coria	1	3
(Croatia) K Mesaroš	2	4
(Spain) R Ramírez Hidalgo	6	6

Quarterfinals
(Argentina) G Andreozzi	7	7
WC	(Argentina) E Schwank	5	5
WC	(Uruguay) P Cuevas
(Spain) R Ramírez Hidalgo	w/o

Semifinals
(Argentina) G Andreozzi	6^{0}	6	3
WC	(Uruguay) P Cuevas	7^{7}	4	6

=== Bottom half ===
First round
5	(Portugal) G Elias	3	6	6^{3}
Q	(Argentina) Gabriel Alejandro Hidalgo	6	2	7^{7}
(Canada) S Diez	6	6
(Chile) P Capdeville	4	2
WC	(Argentina) P Cachin	6	2	5
(Croatia) A Veić	4	6	7
(Brazil) A Ghem	4	6	3
3	(Colombia) A González	6	4	6
8	(Brazil) J Souza	6^{5}	1
(Argentina) F Argüello	7^{7}	6
(Brazil) R Hocevar	3	2
Q	(Portugal) P Sousa	6	6
(Argentina) A Velotti	3	4
(Dominican Republic) V Estrella	6	6
(Argentina) M Alund	6	6
2	(Argentina) DS Schwartzman	3	2

Second round
Q	(Argentina) GA Hidalgo	6^{4}	1
(Canada) S Diez	7^{7}	6
(Croatia) A Veić	6	7
3	(Colombia) A González	2	5
(Argentina) F Argüello	6	4	6
Q	(Portugal) P Sousa	1	6	1
(Dominican Republic) V Estrella	2	3
(Argentina) M Alund	6	6

Quarterfinals
(Canada) S Diez	6	2
(Croatia) A Veić	4	1^{r}
(Argentina) F Argüello	6	7^{7}
(Argentina) M Alund	4	6^{5}

Semifinals
(Canada) S Diez	1	3
(Argentina) F Argüello	6	6
