= 2010 Copa Topper =

- Date: 22–28 November
- Edition: 1st
- Location: Buenos Aires, Argentina

Champions

Singles
- (Argentina) Diego Junqueira

Doubles
- (Argentina) Carlos Berlocq / (Argentina) Brian Dabul
Copa Topper	· 2011 →

The 2010 Copa Topper was a professional tennis tournament played on outdoor red clay courts. It was the first edition of the tournament which was part of the 2010 ATP Challenger Tour. It took place in Buenos Aires, Argentina between 22 and 28 November 2010.

== ATP entrants ==
=== Seeds ===
Country	Player	Rank^{1}	Seed
ARG	Carlos Berlocq	72	1
ESP	Rubén Ramírez Hidalgo	80	2
ARG	Brian Dabul	87	3
ARG	Horacio Zeballos	111	4
ARG	~~Máximo González~~	~~140~~	~~5~~
ARG	Diego Junqueira	181	6
CHI	Jorge Aguilar	193	7
BRA	Júlio Silva	194	8

- Rankings are as of November 15, 2010.

=== Other entrants ===
The following players received wildcards into the singles main draw:

- (Argentina) Guillermo Bujniewicz
- (Argentina) Diego Sebastián Schwartzman
- (Argentina) Marco Trungelliti
- (Argentina) Agustín Velotti

The following players received entry from the qualifying draw:

- (Brazil) Rafael Camilo
- (Argentina) Maximiliano Estévez
- (Argentina) Alejandro Fabbri
- (Argentina) Jonathan Gonzalia
- (Brazil) Rodrigo Guidolin (LL)

== Champions ==
=== Singles ===
(Argentina) Diego Junqueira def. (Argentina) Juan Pablo Brzezicki, 6–2, 6–1

=== Doubles ===
(Argentina) Carlos Berlocq / (Argentina) Brian Dabul def. (Argentina) Andrés Molteni / (Argentina) Guido Pella, 7–6(4), 6–3
