= 2013 Copa Topper – Doubles =

Doubles
- 2013 Copa Topper

Final
- Champions: (Argentina) Máximo González (Argentina) Diego Sebastián Schwartzman
- Runners-up: (Brazil) Rogério Dutra da Silva (Brazil) André Ghem
- Score: 6–3, 7–5

Events
Singles	Doubles
← 2012 ·	Copa Topper	· 2014 →

Martín Alund and Horacio Zeballos were the defending champions but Zeballos decided not to participate.
Alund teamed up with Facundo Bagnis but lost to eventual champions Máximo González and Diego Sebastián Schwartzman in the first round.

González and Schwartzman went on to win the title, defeating Rogério Dutra da Silva and André Ghem in the final, 6–3, 7–5.

== Seeds ==
1. (Brazil) Thomaz Bellucci / (Brazil) Marcelo Demoliner (first round)
2. (Argentina) Martín Alund / (Argentina) Facundo Bagnis (first round)
3. (Uruguay) Ariel Behar / (Argentina) Guillermo Durán (first round)
4. (Netherlands) Stephan Fransen / (Netherlands) Wesley Koolhof (first round)

== Draw ==
=== Key ===
- Q = Qualifier
- WC = Wild card
- LL = Lucky loser
- Alt = Alternate
- SE = Special exempt
- PR = Protected ranking
- ITF = ITF entry
- JE = Junior exempt
- w/o = Walkover
- r = Retired
- d = Defaulted
- SR = Special ranking

=== Draw ===
First round
1	(Brazil) T Bellucci (Brazil) M Demoliner	3	4
(Brazil) R Dutra da Silva (Brazil) A Ghem	6	6
(Peru) S Galdós (Argentina) G Pella	6^{3}	3
WC	(Argentina) A Collarini (Argentina) A Molteni	7^{7}	6
3	(Uruguay) A Behar (Argentina) G Durán	6^{3}	4
(Spain) R Ramírez Hidalgo (Spain) P Riba	7^{7}	6
WC	(Argentina) Francisco Bahamonde (Argentina) JP Paz	1	6^{6}
WC	(Argentina) P Cachin (Argentina) Juan Ignacio Galarza	6	7^{8}
(Argentina) G Andreozzi (Argentina) E Schwank	6	5	[5]
(Argentina) F Argüello (Argentina) R Olivo	2	7	[10]
(Chile) P Capdeville (Croatia) A Veić	6	4	[10]
4	(Netherlands) S Fransen (Netherlands) W Koolhof	4	6	[8]
(Brazil) G Clezar (Portugal) G Elias	6	6
(Dominican Republic) V Estrella Burgos (Brazil) J Souza	4	2
(Argentina) M González (Argentina) DS Schwartzman	6	6
2	(Argentina) M Alund (Argentina) F Bagnis	4	4

Quarterfinals
(Brazil) R Dutra da Silva (Brazil) A Ghem	6	6
WC	(Argentina) A Collarini (Argentina) A Molteni	3	4
(Spain) R Ramírez Hidalgo (Spain) P Riba	7	6
WC	(Argentina) P Cachin (Argentina) JI Galarza	5	0
(Argentina) F Argüello (Argentina) R Olivo	6	7
(Chile) P Capdeville (Croatia) A Veić	4	5
(Brazil) G Clezar (Portugal) G Elias	2	7	[6]
(Argentina) M González (Argentina) DS Schwartzman	6	5	[10]

Semifinals
(Brazil) R Dutra da Silva (Brazil) A Ghem
(Spain) R Ramírez Hidalgo (Spain) P Riba	w/o
(Argentina) F Argüello (Argentina) R Olivo	5	6	[8]
(Argentina) M González (Argentina) DS Schwartzman	7	3	[10]

Final
(Brazil) R Dutra da Silva (Brazil) A Ghem	3	5
(Argentina) M González (Argentina) DS Schwartzman	6	7
