= 2021 Challenger de Buenos Aires – Doubles =

Doubles
- 2021 Challenger de Buenos Aires

Final
- Champions: (Italy) Luciano Darderi (Argentina) Juan Bautista Torres
- Runners-up: (Argentina) Hernán Casanova (Argentina) Santiago Rodríguez Taverna
- Score: 7–6^{(7–5)}, 7–6^{(12–10)}

Events
Singles	Doubles
- Challenger de Buenos Aires

Guido Andreozzi and Andrés Molteni were the defending champions but only Andreozzi chose to defend his title, partnering Thiago Seyboth Wild. Andreozzi withdrew from the tournament before his quarterfinal match.

Luciano Darderi and Juan Bautista Torres won the title after defeating Hernán Casanova and Santiago Rodríguez Taverna 7–6^{(7–5)}, 7–6^{(12–10)} in the final.

== Seeds ==
1. (Brazil) Rafael Matos / (Brazil) Felipe Meligeni Alves (quarterfinals)
2. (Brazil) Fernando Romboli / (Bolivia) Federico Zeballos (first round)
3. (Argentina) Guillermo Durán / (Argentina) Thiago Agustín Tirante (quarterfinals)
4. (United States) Max Schnur / (United States) Reese Stalder (first round)

== Draw ==
Key

- Q = Qualifier
- WC = Wild card
- LL = Lucky loser
- Alt = Alternate
- ITF = ITF entry
- PR = Protected ranking
- SR = Special ranking
- SE = Special exempt
- JE = Junior exempt
- JR = Junior Accelerator Programme entrant
- CO = College Accelerator Programme entrant
- NG = Next Gen Accelerator Program entrant
- w/o = Walkover
- r = Retired
- d = Defaulted

First round
1	(Brazil) R Matos (Brazil) F Meligeni Alves	6	7
(Argentina) F Cerúndolo (Uruguay) M Cuevas	2	5
(Italy) L Darderi (Argentina) JB Torres	7^{9}	6
(Argentina) TM Etcheverry (Argentina) R Olivo	6^{7}	2
4	(United States) M Schnur (United States) R Stalder	6	2	[6]
WC	(Argentina) Leonardo Aboian (Argentina) V Aboian	3	6	[10]
WC	(Argentina) JM La Serna (Argentina) L Midón	4	1
(Argentina) G Andreozzi (Brazil) T Seyboth Wild	6	6
(Argentina) H Casanova (Argentina) S Rodríguez Taverna	6	7^{7}
(Argentina) A Collarini (Argentina) M Kestelboim	2	6^{3}
(Argentina) P Cachin (Spain) C Gómez-Herrera
3	(Argentina) G Durán (Argentina) TA Tirante	w/o
(Dominican Republic) N Hardt (Spain) N Sánchez Izquierdo	w/o
WC	(Argentina) F Comesaña (Argentina) M Navone
(Argentina) N Kicker (Argentina) C Ugo Carabelli	7	6
2	(Brazil) F Romboli (Bolivia) F Zeballos	5	0

Quarterfinals
1	(Brazil) R Matos (Brazil) F Meligeni Alves	6^{3}	6	[6]
(Italy) L Darderi (Argentina) JB Torres	7^{7}	2	[10]
WC	(Argentina) L Aboian (Argentina) V Aboian	w/o
(Argentina) G Andreozzi (Brazil) T Seyboth Wild
(Argentina) H Casanova (Argentina) S Rodríguez Taverna	6	6^{4}	[10]
3	(Argentina) G Durán (Argentina) TA Tirante	1	7^{7}	[8]
(Dominican Republic) N Hardt (Spain) N Sánchez Izquierdo	6	4	[6]
(Argentina) N Kicker (Argentina) C Ugo Carabelli	2	6	[10]

Semifinals
(Italy) L Darderi (Argentina) JB Torres	7^{7}	6
WC	(Argentina) L Aboian (Argentina) V Aboian	6^{3}	4
(Argentina) H Casanova (Argentina) S Rodríguez Taverna	6	6
(Argentina) N Kicker (Argentina) C Ugo Carabelli	3	2

Final
(Italy) L Darderi (Argentina) JB Torres	7^{7}	7^{12}
(Argentina) H Casanova (Argentina) S Rodríguez Taverna	6^{5}	6^{10}
