= 2017 Copa Fila – Doubles =

Doubles
- 2017 Copa Fila

Final
- Champions: (Uruguay) Ariel Behar; (Brazil) Fabiano de Paula
- Runners-up: (Argentina) Máximo González; (Brazil) Fabrício Neis
- Score: 7–6^{(7–3)}, 5–7, [10–8]

Events
Singles	Doubles
- Copa Fila

Julio Peralta and Horacio Zeballos were the defending champions but chose not to defend their title.

Ariel Behar and Fabiano de Paula won the title after defeating Máximo González and Fabrício Neis 7–6^{(7–3)}, 5–7, [10–8] in the final.

== Seeds ==
1. (Uruguay) Ariel Behar / (Brazil) Fabiano de Paula (champions)
2. (Argentina) Máximo González / (Brazil) Fabrício Neis (final)
3. (Peru) Sergio Galdós / (Brazil) Fernando Romboli (semifinals)
4. (Argentina) Federico Coria / (Argentina) Tomás Lipovšek Puches (semifinals)

== Draw ==
Key

- Q = Qualifier
- WC = Wild card
- LL = Lucky loser
- Alt = Alternate
- ITF = ITF entry
- PR = Protected ranking
- SR = Special ranking
- SE = Special exempt
- JE = Junior exempt
- JR = Junior Accelerator Programme entrant
- CO = College Accelerator Programme entrant
- NG = Next Gen Accelerator Program entrant
- w/o = Walkover
- r = Retired
- d = Defaulted

First round

Quarterfinals

Semifinals

Final

1
- (Uruguay) A Behar
- (Brazil) F de Paula
6
6^{4}
[10]

- (Slovakia) J Kovalík
- (Slovakia) A Martin
2
7^{7}
[4]

1
- (Uruguay) A Behar
- (Brazil) F de Paula
w/o

- (Argentina) JI Londero
- (Argentina) F Mena
6
3
[10]

- (Argentina) JI Londero
- (Argentina) F Mena

WC
- (Argentina) F Argüello
- (Argentina) G Villanueva
3
6
[4]

1
- (Uruguay) A Behar
- (Brazil) F de Paula
6
7^{7}

4
- (Argentina) F Coria
- (Argentina) T Lipovšek Puches
6
6

4
- (Argentina) F Coria
- (Argentina) T Lipovšek Puches
2
6^{5}

- (Austria) M Linzer
- (Brazil) JP Sorgi
3
4

4
- (Argentina) F Coria
- (Argentina) T Lipovšek Puches
7^{7}
7

- (Austria) G Melzer
- (Brazil) J Souza
6
6

- (Austria) G Melzer
- (Brazil) J Souza
6^{4}
5

WC
- (Argentina) H Casanova
- (Argentina) JP Paz
4
0

1
- (Uruguay) A Behar
- (Brazil) F de Paula
7^{7}
5
[10]

- (Spain) J Munar
- (Spain) M Vilella Martínez
7
6^{4}
[10]

2
- (Argentina) M González
- (Brazil) F Neis
6^{3}
7
[8]

(Argentina) F Agamenone
(Argentina) M Kestelboim
5
7^{7}
[8]

- (Spain) J Munar
- (Spain) M Vilella Martínez
2
5

WC
- (Argentina) GA Olivieri
- (Argentina) C Ugo Carabelli
6
3
[7]

3
- (Peru) S Galdós
- (Brazil) F Romboli
6
7

3
- (Peru) S Galdós
- (Brazil) F Romboli
4
6
[10]

3
- (Peru) S Galdós
- (Brazil) F Romboli
6^{2}
2

- (Austria) Lenny Hampel
- (France) M Janvier
6
3
[5]

2
- (Argentina) M González
- (Brazil) F Neis
7^{7}
6

- (Brazil) G Clezar
- (Slovenia) B Rola
4
6
[10]

- (Brazil) G Clezar
- (Slovenia) B Rola

- (Portugal) J Domingues
- (Portugal) G Oliveira
2
4

2
- (Argentina) M González
- (Brazil) F Neis
w/o

2
- (Argentina) M González
- (Brazil) F Neis
6
6
