= 2018 Challenger de Buenos Aires – Doubles =

Doubles
- 2018 Challenger de Buenos Aires

Final
- Champions: (Argentina) Guido Andreozzi; (Argentina) Guillermo Durán
- Runners-up: (Brazil) Marcelo Demoliner; (Argentina) Andrés Molteni
- Score: 6–4, 4–6, [10–3]

Events
Singles	Doubles
- Challenger de Buenos Aires

Ariel Behar and Fabiano de Paula were the defending champions but chose not to defend their title.

Guido Andreozzi and Guillermo Durán won the title after defeating Marcelo Demoliner and Andrés Molteni 6–4, 4–6, [10–3] in the final.

== Seeds ==
1. (Brazil) Marcelo Demoliner / (Argentina) Andrés Molteni (final)
2. (Argentina) Guido Andreozzi / (Argentina) Guillermo Durán (champions)
3. (Argentina) Tomás Lipovšek Puches / (Brazil) Fernando Romboli (semifinals)
4. (Peru) Sergio Galdós / (Bolivia) Federico Zeballos (semifinals)

== Draw ==
Key

- Q = Qualifier
- WC = Wild card
- LL = Lucky loser
- Alt = Alternate
- ITF = ITF entry
- PR = Protected ranking
- SR = Special ranking
- SE = Special exempt
- JE = Junior exempt
- JR = Junior Accelerator Programme entrant
- CO = College Accelerator Programme entrant
- NG = Next Gen Accelerator Program entrant
- w/o = Walkover
- r = Retired
- d = Defaulted

First round

Quarterfinals

Semifinals

Final

1
- (Brazil) M Demoliner
- (Argentina) A Molteni
6
4
[10]

WC
(Argentina) R Olivo
(Argentina) Matías Zukas
3
6
[6]

1
- (Brazil) M Demoliner
- (Argentina) A Molteni
6
6

PR
- (United States) U Blanch
- (Argentina) F Mena
5
6
[7]

- (Romania) D Dima
- (Ecuador) G Escobar
1
4

- (Romania) D Dima
- (Ecuador) G Escobar
7
3
[10]

1
- (Brazil) M Demoliner
- (Argentina) A Molteni
6
6

4
- (Peru) S Galdós
- (Bolivia) F Zeballos
6
6

4
- (Peru) S Galdós
- (Bolivia) F Zeballos
2
2

WC
- (Argentina) GA Olivieri
- (Argentina) C Ugo Carabelli
4
1

4
- (Peru) S Galdós
- (Bolivia) F Zeballos
w/o

- (Belgium) A De Greef
- (Bulgaria) D Kuzmanov
3
1

- (Uruguay) M Cuevas
- (Bolivia) H Dellien

- (Uruguay) M Cuevas
- (Bolivia) H Dellien
6
6

1
- (Brazil) M Demoliner
- (Argentina) A Molteni
4
6
[3]

(Argentina) H Casanova
(Argentina) Juan Ignacio Galarza
6
3
[10]

2
- (Argentina) G Andreozzi
- (Argentina) G Durán
6
4
[10]

- (Brazil) G Clezar
- (Portugal) J Domingues
4
6
[7]

(Argentina) H Casanova
(Argentina) JI Galarza
4
5

- (Argentina) A Collarini
- (Argentina) F Coria
3
6^{8}

3
- (Argentina) T Lipovšek Puches
- (Brazil) F Romboli
6
7

3
- (Argentina) T Lipovšek Puches
- (Brazil) F Romboli
6
7^{10}

3
- (Argentina) T Lipovšek Puches
- (Brazil) F Romboli
2
4

Alt
- (Brazil) O Luz
- (Brazil) F Meligeni Alves
6
3
[10]

2
- (Argentina) G Andreozzi
- (Argentina) G Durán
6
6

WC
- (Argentina) F Cerúndolo
- (Argentina) M Peña López
2
6
[8]

Alt
- (Brazil) O Luz
- (Brazil) F Meligeni Alves
5
6^{3}

- (Argentina) F Agamenone
- (Argentina) F Argüello
6^{4}
4

2
- (Argentina) G Andreozzi
- (Argentina) G Durán
7
7^{7}

2
- (Argentina) G Andreozzi
- (Argentina) G Durán
7^{7}
6
