= 2024 Challenger de Buenos Aires – Singles =

Singles
- 2024 Challenger de Buenos Aires

Final
- Champion: (Argentina) Francisco Comesaña
- Runner-up: (Argentina) Federico Coria
- Score: 1–6, 7–6^{(9–7)}, 6–4

Events
Singles	Doubles
- Challenger de Buenos Aires

Mariano Navone was the defending champion but chose not to defend his title.

Francisco Comesaña won the title after defeating Federico Coria 1–6, 7–6^{(9–7)}, 6–4 in the final.

== Seeds ==
1. (Argentina) Federico Coria (final)
2. (Argentina) Francisco Comesaña (champion)
3. (Bolivia) Hugo Dellien (semifinals)
4. (Argentina) Camilo Ugo Carabelli (quarterfinals)
5. (Netherlands) Jesper de Jong (quarterfinals)
6. (Argentina) Román Andrés Burruchaga (second round)
7. (Brazil) Gustavo Heide (quarterfinals)
8. (Argentina) Federico Agustín Gómez (first round)

== Draw ==
Key

- Q = Qualifier
- WC = Wild card
- LL = Lucky loser
- Alt = Alternate
- ITF = ITF entry
- PR = Protected ranking
- SR = Special ranking
- SE = Special exempt
- JE = Junior exempt
- JR = Junior Accelerator Programme entrant
- CO = College Accelerator Programme entrant
- NG = Next Gen Accelerator Program entrant
- w/o = Walkover
- r = Retired
- d = Defaulted

=== Finals ===
Semifinals
1	(Argentina) Federico Coria	7^{13}	7
WC	(Argentina) Juan Bautista Torres	6^{11}	5
3	(Bolivia) Hugo Dellien	4	6	2
2	(Argentina) Francisco Comesaña	6	3	6

Final
1	(Argentina) Federico Coria	6	6^{7}	4
2	(Argentina) Francisco Comesaña	1	7^{9}	6

=== Top half ===
First round
1	(Argentina) F Coria	5	6	6
(Ecuador) Á Guillén Meza	7	1	2
WC	(Argentina) GA Olivieri	6^{5}	4
Q	(Argentina) G Villanueva	7^{7}	6
(France) E Couacaud	6	6
WC	(Argentina) JI Londero	4	4
Q	(Peru) C Huertas del Pino	4	5
7	(Brazil) G Heide	6	7
4	(Argentina) C Ugo Carabelli	6	6
(Argentina) S Rodríguez Taverna	1	3
Q	(Argentina) V Aboian	5	4
(Bolivia) M Dellien	7	6
WC	(Argentina) JB Torres	6	6
(Argentina) JP Ficovich	2	4
(Argentina) JM Cerúndolo	6	6
8	(Argentina) FA Gómez	3	2

Second round
1	(Argentina) F Coria	6	6
Q	(Argentina) G Villanueva	4	3
(France) E Couacaud	4	6^{3}
7	(Brazil) G Heide	6	7^{7}
4	(Argentina) C Ugo Carabelli	6	6
(Bolivia) M Dellien	4	4
WC	(Argentina) JB Torres	6	6
(Argentina) JM Cerúndolo	3	4

Quarterfinals
1	(Argentina) F Coria	6	6
7	(Brazil) G Heide	4	4
4	(Argentina) C Ugo Carabelli	0	4
WC	(Argentina) JB Torres	6	6

Semifinals
1	(Argentina) F Coria	7^{13}	7
WC	(Argentina) JB Torres	6^{11}	5

=== Bottom half ===
First round
5	(Netherlands) J de Jong	6	6
(Argentina) F Mena	4	0
Q	(Argentina) Tomás Farjat	2	6	0
(Argentina) A Collarini	6	3	6
(Brazil) F Meligeni Alves	1	7^{7}	7^{8}
Q	(Argentina) LE Ambrogi	6	6^{5}	6^{6}
(Lebanon) H Habib	0	2
3	(Bolivia) H Dellien	6	6
6	(Argentina) RA Burruchaga	3	7^{9}	6
SE	(Paraguay) AD Vallejo	6	6^{7}	1
(Brazil) P Sakamoto	6^{4}	2
(Peru) JP Varillas	7^{7}	6
(Kazakhstan) D Popko	6	6^{4}	7^{7}
Q	(Argentina) N Kicker	2	7^{7}	6^{3}
Alt	(Peru) G Bueno	5	4
2	(Argentina) F Comesaña	7	6

Second round
5	(Netherlands) J de Jong	6	6
(Argentina) A Collarini	4	3
(Brazil) F Meligeni Alves	3	4
3	(Bolivia) H Dellien	6	6
6	(Argentina) RA Burruchaga	1	3
(Peru) JP Varillas	6	6
(Kazakhstan) D Popko	6^{4}	6^{7}
2	(Argentina) F Comesaña	7^{7}	7^{9}

Quarterfinals
5	(Netherlands) J de Jong	3	6	2
3	(Bolivia) H Dellien	6	1	6
(Peru) JP Varillas	4	7^{8}	5
2	(Argentina) F Comesaña	6	6^{6}	7

Semifinals
3	(Bolivia) H Dellien	4	6	2
2	(Argentina) F Comesaña	6	3	6
