= 2011 Copa Topper =

- Date: 7–13 November
- Edition: 8th
- Location: Buenos Aires, Argentina

Champions

Singles
- (Argentina) Carlos Berlocq

Doubles
- (Argentina) Carlos Berlocq / (Argentina) Eduardo Schwank
← 2010 ·	Copa Topper	· 2012 →

The 2011 Copa Topper was a professional tennis tournament played on clay courts. It was the eighth edition of the tournament which is part of the 2011 ATP Challenger Tour. It took place in Buenos Aires, Argentina between 7 and 13 November 2011.

== ATP entrants ==
=== Seeds ===
Country	Player	Rank^{1}	Seed
ARG	Carlos Berlocq	65	1
POR	Rui Machado	77	2
BRA	Ricardo Mello	84	3
ARG	Diego Junqueira	88	4
ARG	Leonardo Mayer	95	5
POR	Frederico Gil	96	6
BRA	João Souza	104	7
CHI	Paul Capdeville	111	8

- ^{1} Rankings are as of October 31, 2011.

=== Other entrants ===
The following players received wildcards into the singles main draw:

- (Argentina) Facundo Argüello
- (Argentina) Nicolás Pastor
- (Argentina) Marco Trungelliti
- (Argentina) Agustín Velotti

The following players received entry as a special exempt into the singles main draw:

- (Argentina) Juan Pablo Brzezicki

The following players received entry from the qualifying draw:

- (Uruguay) Marcel Felder
- (Russia) Andrey Kuznetsov
- (Argentina) Leandro Migani
- (Argentina) Diego Schwartzman

== Champions ==
=== Singles ===
(Argentina) Carlos Berlocq def. (Portugal) Gastão Elias, 6–1, 7–6^{(7–3)}

=== Doubles ===
(Argentina) Carlos Berlocq / (Argentina) Eduardo Schwank def. (Uruguay) Marcel Felder / (Czech Republic) Jaroslav Pospíšil, 6–7^{(1–7)}, 6–4, [10–7]
