= 2012 Copa Topper =

- Date: 22–28 October
- Edition: 3rd
- Surface: Clay
- Location: Buenos Aires, Argentina

Champions

Singles
- (Argentina) Diego Sebastián Schwartzman

Doubles
- (Argentina) Martín Alund / (Argentina) Horacio Zeballos
← 2011 ·	Copa Topper	· 2013 →

The 2012 Copa Topper was a professional tennis tournament played on clay courts. It was the third edition of the tournament which was part of the 2012 ATP Challenger Tour. It took place in Buenos Aires, Argentina between 22 and 28 October 2012.

== Singles main draw entrants ==
=== Seeds ===
Country	Player	Rank^{1}	Seed
ARG	Leonardo Mayer	78	1
SVN	Blaž Kavčič	106	2
ARG	Martín Alund	121	3
FRA	Guillaume Rufin	124	4
ARG	Horacio Zeballos	125	5
BRA	Rogério Dutra da Silva	131	6
POR	Frederico Gil	138	7
ARG	Guido Andreozzi	184	8

- ^{1} Rankings are as of October 15, 2012.

=== Other entrants ===
The following players received wildcards into the singles main draw:

- (Argentina) Andrea Collarini
- (Argentina) Tomás Lipovšek Puches
- (Argentina) Andrés Molteni
- (Argentina) Renzo Olivo

The following players received entry from the qualifying draw:

- (Argentina) Juan-Martín Aranguren
- (Argentina) Juan Ignacio Londero
- (Germany) Simon Stadler
- (Netherlands) Antal van der Duim

== Champions ==
=== Singles ===
- (Argentina) Diego Schwartzman def. (France) Guillaume Rufin, 6–1, 7–5

=== Doubles ===
- (Argentina) Martín Alund / (Argentina) Horacio Zeballos def. (Argentina) Facundo Argüello / (Argentina) Agustín Velotti, 7–6^{(8–6)}, 6–2
