= 2017 Copa Fila =

- Date: 9–15 October
- Edition: 7th
- Surface: Clay
- Location: Buenos Aires, Argentina

Champions

Singles
- (Argentina) Nicolás Kicker

Doubles
- (Uruguay) Ariel Behar / (Brazil) Fabiano de Paula
← 2016 ·	Copa Fila	· 2018 →

The 2017 Copa Fila was a professional tennis tournament played on clay courts. It was the seventh edition of the tournament which was part of the 2017 ATP Challenger Tour. It took place in Buenos Aires, Argentina between 9 and 15 October 2017.

== Singles main-draw entrants ==
=== Seeds ===
Country	Player	Rank^{1}	Seed
ARG	Horacio Zeballos	67	1
ARG	Federico Delbonis	69	2
ARG	Nicolás Kicker	99	3
AUT	Gerald Melzer	131	4
ARG	Renzo Olivo	135	5
ARG	Facundo Bagnis	140	6
POR	Gastão Elias	146	7
~~ARG~~	~~Guido Andreozzi~~	~~155~~	~~8~~
SVK	Jozef Kovalík	170	9

- ^{1} Rankings are as of October 2, 2017.

=== Other entrants ===
The following players received wildcards into the singles main draw:

- (Argentina) Sebastián Báez
- (Argentina) Hernán Casanova
- (Argentina) Juan Pablo Ficovich
- (Argentina) Nicolás Kicker

The following players received entry into the singles main draw as alternates:

- (Sweden) Christian Lindell
- (Argentina) Facundo Mena

The following players received entry from the qualifying draw:

- (Uruguay) Martín Cuevas
- (Spain) Marc Giner
- (Argentina) Juan Ignacio Londero
- (Spain) Mario Vilella Martínez

The following player received entry as a lucky loser:

- (Argentina) Juan Pablo Paz

== Champions ==
=== Singles ===
- (Argentina) Nicolás Kicker def. (Argentina) Horacio Zeballos 6–7^{(5–7)}, 6–0, 7–5.

=== Doubles ===
- (Uruguay) Ariel Behar / (Brazil) Fabiano de Paula def. (Argentina) Máximo González / (Brazil) Fabrício Neis 7–6^{(7–3)}, 5–7, [10–8].
