= 2017 Copa Fila – Singles =

Singles
- 2017 Copa Fila

Final
- Champion: (Argentina) Nicolás Kicker
- Runner-up: (Argentina) Horacio Zeballos
- Score: 6–7^{(5–7)}, 6–0, 7–5

Events
Singles	Doubles
- Copa Fila

Renzo Olivo was the defending champion but lost in the quarterfinals to Horacio Zeballos.

Nicolás Kicker won the title after defeating Zeballos 6–7^{(5–7)}, 6–0, 7–5 in the final.

== Seeds ==
1. (Argentina) Horacio Zeballos (final)
2. (Argentina) Federico Delbonis (quarterfinals)
3. (Argentina) Nicolás Kicker (champion)
4. (Austria) Gerald Melzer (semifinals)
5. (Argentina) Renzo Olivo (quarterfinals)
6. (Argentina) Facundo Bagnis (first round)
7. (Portugal) Gastão Elias (semifinals)
8. (Argentina) Guido Andreozzi (withdrew)
9. (Slovakia) Jozef Kovalík (first round)

== Draw ==
Key

- Q = Qualifier
- WC = Wild card
- LL = Lucky loser
- Alt = Alternate
- ITF = ITF entry
- PR = Protected ranking
- SR = Special ranking
- SE = Special exempt
- JE = Junior exempt
- JR = Junior Accelerator Programme entrant
- CO = College Accelerator Programme entrant
- NG = Next Gen Accelerator Program entrant
- w/o = Walkover
- r = Retired
- d = Defaulted

=== Finals ===
Semifinals
1	(Argentina) Horacio Zeballos	6	7^{7}
4	(Austria) Gerald Melzer	3	6^{5}
3/WC	(Argentina) Nicolás Kicker	6	6
7	(Portugal) Gastão Elias	4	2

Final
1	(Argentina) Horacio Zeballos	7^{7}	0	5
3/WC	(Argentina) Nicolás Kicker	6^{5}	6	7

=== Top half ===
First round
1	(Argentina) H Zeballos	6	6
LL	(Argentina) JP Paz	4	1
(Argentina) M González	6	6
(Brazil) J Souza	3	1
(Brazil) G Clezar	3	7^{7}	3
(Austria) M Linzer	6	6^{2}	6
(Slovakia) A Martin	5	1
5	(Argentina) R Olivo	7	6
4	(Austria) G Melzer	7	6
(Brazil) JP Sorgi	5	4
Q	(Uruguay) M Cuevas	0	4
(Slovenia) B Rola	6	6
WC	(Argentina) S Báez	4	2
(Argentina) A Collarini	6	6
(Portugal) J Domingues	7^{7}	6
6	(Argentina) F Bagnis	6^{1}	3

Second round
1	(Argentina) H Zeballos	6	7^{7}
(Argentina) M González	2	6^{1}
(Austria) M Linzer	2	2
5	(Argentina) R Olivo	6	6
4	(Austria) G Melzer	6	6
(Slovenia) B Rola	4	3
(Argentina) A Collarini	6	2	4
(Portugal) J Domingues	4	6	6

Quarterfinals
1	(Argentina) H Zeballos	6	6
5	(Argentina) R Olivo	2	1
4	(Austria) G Melzer	6	6
(Portugal) J Domingues	3	1

Semifinals
1	(Argentina) H Zeballos	6	7^{7}
4	(Austria) G Melzer	3	6^{5}

=== Bottom half ===
First round
9	(Slovakia) J Kovalík	6	3	4
(Argentina) F Coria	2	6	6
Alt	(Sweden) C Lindell	4	2
WC	(Argentina) JP Ficovich	6	6
WC	(Argentina) H Casanova	6^{4}	6^{1}
(Spain) J Munar	7^{7}	7^{7}
Q	(Spain) M Vilella Martínez	1	5
3/WC	(Argentina) N Kicker	6	7
7	(Portugal) G Elias	6	7^{7}
Q	(Spain) Marc Giner	3	6^{4}
(Argentina) F Argüello	6	6
Alt	(Argentina) F Mena	2	4
(Portugal) G Oliveira	3	5
(France) M Janvier	6	7
Q	(Argentina) JI Londero	2	2
2	(Argentina) F Delbonis	6	6

Second round
(Argentina) F Coria	6	6
WC	(Argentina) JP Ficovich	4	0
(Spain) J Munar	1	3
3/WC	(Argentina) N Kicker	6	6
7	(Portugal) G Elias	6	6
(Argentina) F Argüello	3	2
(France) M Janvier	5	5
2	(Argentina) F Delbonis	7	7

Quarterfinals
(Argentina) F Coria	7	3	4
3/WC	(Argentina) N Kicker	5	6	6
7	(Portugal) G Elias	7	6
2	(Argentina) F Delbonis	5	1

Semifinals
3/WC	(Argentina) N Kicker	6	6
7	(Portugal) G Elias	4	2
