= 2024 Challenger de Buenos Aires =

- Date: 30 September – 6 October
- Edition: 13th
- Surface: Clay
- Location: Buenos Aires, Argentina

Champions

Singles
- (Argentina) Francisco Comesaña

Doubles
- (Bolivia) Murkel Dellien / (Argentina) Facundo Mena
- Challenger de Buenos Aires

The 2024 YPF Buenos Aires Challenger was a professional tennis tournament played on clay courts. It was the 13th edition of the tournament which was part of the 2024 ATP Challenger Tour. It took place in Buenos Aires, Argentina between 30 September and 6 October 2024.

== Singles main-draw entrants ==
=== Seeds ===
| Country | Player | Rank^{1} | Seed |
|---|---|---|---|
| ARG | Federico Coria | 93 | 1 |
| ARG | Francisco Comesaña | 102 | 2 |
| BOL | Hugo Dellien | 107 | 3 |
| ARG | Camilo Ugo Carabelli | 112 | 4 |
| NED | Jesper de Jong | 128 | 5 |
| ARG | Román Andrés Burruchaga | 130 | 6 |
| BRA | Gustavo Heide | 156 | 7 |
| ARG | Federico Agustín Gómez | 158 | 8 |

- ^{1} Rankings are as of 23 September 2024.

=== Other entrants ===
The following players received wildcards into the singles main draw:

- (Argentina) Juan Ignacio Londero
- (Argentina) Genaro Alberto Olivieri
- (Argentina) Juan Bautista Torres

The following player received entry into the singles main draw as a special exempt:

- (Paraguay) Daniel Vallejo

The following players received entry from the qualifying draw:

- (Argentina) Valerio Aboian
- (Argentina) Luciano Emanuel Ambrogi
- (Argentina) Tomás Farjat
- (Peru) Conner Huertas del Pino
- (Argentina) Nicolás Kicker
- (Argentina) Gonzalo Villanueva

== Champions ==
=== Singles ===
- (Argentina) Francisco Comesaña def. (Argentina) Federico Coria 1–6, 7–6^{(9–7)}, 6–4.

=== Doubles ===
- (Bolivia) Murkel Dellien / (Argentina) Facundo Mena def. (Brazil) Felipe Meligeni Alves / (Brazil) Marcelo Zormann 1–6, 6–2, [12–10].
