= 2022 Challenger de Buenos Aires – Singles =

Singles
- 2022 Challenger de Buenos Aires

Final
- Champion: (Argentina) Juan Manuel Cerúndolo
- Runner-up: (Argentina) Camilo Ugo Carabelli
- Score: 6–4, 2–6, 7–5

Events
Singles	Doubles
- Challenger de Buenos Aires

Sebastián Báez was the defending champion but chose not to defend his title.

Juan Manuel Cerúndolo won the title after defeating Camilo Ugo Carabelli 6–4, 2–6, 7–5 in the final.

== Seeds ==
1. (Argentina) Federico Coria (first round)
2. (Germany) Daniel Altmaier (second round)
3. (Peru) Juan Pablo Varillas (withdrew)
4. (Argentina) Camilo Ugo Carabelli (final)
5. (Argentina) Facundo Bagnis (quarterfinals)
6. (Brazil) Felipe Meligeni Alves (first round)
7. (Argentina) Santiago Rodríguez Taverna (first round)
8. (Germany) Yannick Hanfmann (second round, withdrew)

== Draw ==
Key

- Q = Qualifier
- WC = Wild card
- LL = Lucky loser
- Alt = Alternate
- ITF = ITF entry
- PR = Protected ranking
- SR = Special ranking
- SE = Special exempt
- JE = Junior exempt
- JR = Junior Accelerator Programme entrant
- CO = College Accelerator Programme entrant
- NG = Next Gen Accelerator Program entrant
- w/o = Walkover
- r = Retired
- d = Defaulted

=== Finals ===
Semifinals
SE	(Argentina) Mariano Navone	3	5
(Argentina) Juan Manuel Cerúndolo	6	7
4	(Argentina) Camilo Ugo Carabelli	6	6
(Kazakhstan) Dmitry Popko	2	1

Final
(Argentina) Juan Manuel Cerúndolo	6	2	7
4	(Argentina) Camilo Ugo Carabelli	4	6	5

=== Top half ===
First round
1	(Argentina) F Coria	2	6^{4}
(Italy) L Darderi	6	7^{7}
PR	(India) S Nagal	7	6^{4}	5
Q	(Brazil) T Seyboth Wild	5	7^{7}	7
Alt	(Argentina) F Díaz Acosta	4	4
LL	(Spain) C Sánchez Jover	6	6
SE	(Argentina) M Navone	6	6
6	(Brazil) F Meligeni Alves	2	4
Q	(Argentina) H Casanova	6	5	6
(Argentina) A Collarini	4	7	3
Q	(Peru) N Álvarez	3	3
(Argentina) JM Cerúndolo	6	6
(Argentina) JB Torres	7^{7}	3	6
(Argentina) GA Olivieri	6^{1}	6	3
(Argentina) TA Tirante	1	4
5	(Argentina) F Bagnis	6	6

Second round
(Italy) L Darderi	5	3
Q	(Brazil) T Seyboth Wild	7	6
LL	(Spain) C Sánchez Jover	6	3	1
SE	(Argentina) M Navone	4	6	6
Q	(Argentina) H Casanova	2	2
(Argentina) JM Cerúndolo	6	6
(Argentina) JB Torres	1	4
5	(Argentina) F Bagnis	6	6

Quarterfinals
Q	(Brazil) T Seyboth Wild	3	1
SE	(Argentina) M Navone	6	6
(Argentina) JM Cerúndolo	6	6
5	(Argentina) F Bagnis	4	2

Semifinals
SE	(Argentina) M Navone	3	5
(Argentina) JM Cerúndolo	6	7

=== Bottom half ===
First round
8	(Germany) Y Hanfmann	6	6
Alt	(Argentina) G Villanueva	2	4
(Argentina) N Kicker	3	7	4
(Argentina) R Olivo	6	5	6
Q	(Argentina) Ignacio Monzón	7	4	6^{4}
WC	(Argentina) Juan Bautista Otegui	5	6	7^{7}
(Brazil) D Dutra da Silva	2	2
4	(Argentina) C Ugo Carabelli	6	6
7	(Argentina) S Rodríguez Taverna	6^{8}	6	5
(Kazakhstan) D Popko	7^{10}	0	7
Q	(Brazil) Wilson Leite	4	6	6
WC	(Argentina) L Midón	6	3	1
WC	(Argentina) RA Burruchaga	6	6
Q	(Argentina) Facundo Juárez	3	3
(Spain) P Martín Tiffon	4	3
2	(Germany) D Altmaier	6	6

Second round
8	(Germany) Y Hanfmann
(Argentina) R Olivo	w/o
WC	(Argentina) JB Otegui	2	6	4
4	(Argentina) C Ugo Carabelli	6	0	6
(Kazakhstan) D Popko	6	6
Q	(Brazil) W Leite	4	3
WC	(Argentina) RA Burruchaga	7^{8}	7
2	(Germany) D Altmaier	6^{6}	5

Quarterfinals
(Argentina) R Olivo	3	6	2
4	(Argentina) C Ugo Carabelli	6	4	6
(Kazakhstan) D Popko	7	0	6
WC	(Argentina) RA Burruchaga	5	6	2

Semifinals
4	(Argentina) C Ugo Carabelli	6	6
(Kazakhstan) D Popko	2	1
