= 2021 Challenger de Buenos Aires =

- Date: 18–24 October
- Edition: 10th
- Surface: Clay
- Location: Buenos Aires, Argentina

Champions

Singles
- (Argentina) Sebastián Báez

Doubles
- (Italy) Luciano Darderi / (Argentina) Juan Bautista Torres
- Challenger de Buenos Aires

The 2021 Dove Men+Care Legión Sudamericana Challenger de Buenos Aires was a professional tennis tournament played on clay courts. It was the tenth edition of the tournament which was part of the 2021 ATP Challenger Tour. It took place in Buenos Aires, Argentina between 18 and 24 October 2021.

== Singles main-draw entrants ==
=== Seeds ===
| Country | Player | Rank^{1} | Seed |
|---|---|---|---|
| BRA | Thiago Monteiro | 92 | 1 |
| ARG | Juan Manuel Cerúndolo | 103 | 2 |
| ARG | Francisco Cerúndolo | 110 | 3 |
| PER | Juan Pablo Varillas | 127 | 4 |
| BOL | Hugo Dellien | 128 | 5 |
| BRA | Thiago Seyboth Wild | 129 | 6 |
| ARG | Sebastián Báez | 140 | 7 |
| ARG | Tomás Martín Etcheverry | 144 | 8 |

- ^{1} Rankings are as of 4 October 2021.

=== Other entrants ===
The following players received wildcards into the singles main draw:

- (Argentina) Román Andrés Burruchaga
- (Argentina) Mariano Navone
- (Argentina) Juan Bautista Torres

The following players received entry from the qualifying draw:

- (Argentina) Francisco Comesaña
- (Uruguay) Martín Cuevas
- (Spain) Carlos Gómez-Herrera
- (Argentina) Ignacio Monzón

== Champions ==
=== Singles ===
- (Argentina) Sebastián Báez def. (Brazil) Thiago Monteiro 6–4, 6–0.

=== Doubles ===
- (Italy) Luciano Darderi / (Argentina) Juan Bautista Torres def. (Argentina) Hernán Casanova / (Argentina) Santiago Rodríguez Taverna 7–6^{(7–5)}, 7–6^{(12–10)}.
