= Challenger de Buenos Aires =

Tennis tournament in Argentina

- 2025 Challenger de Buenos Aires

ATP Challenger Tour
- Event name: YPF Buenos Aires Challenger
- Location: Buenos Aires, Argentina
- Venue: Racket Club de Palermo
- Category: ATP Challenger Tour
- Surface: Clay / Outdoors
- Draw: 32S/32Q/16D
- Prize money: $100,000 (2025), $82,000+H
- Website: bachallenger.com

The YPF Buenos Aires Challenger (formerly known as Dove Men+Care Challenger de Buenos Aires, Copa San Cristóbal Seguros presentada por FILA or Copa Fila, and Copa Topper for sponsorship reasons) is a tennis tournament held in Buenos Aires, Argentina, since 2010. The event is part of the ATP Challenger Tour and is played on outdoor red clay courts.

== Past finals ==
=== Singles ===
Year	Champion	Runner-up	Score
2026	(Argentina) Alex Barrena	(Argentina) Facundo Mena	6–4, 6–0
2025	(Argentina) Román Andrés Burruchaga	(Argentina) Alex Barrena	7–6^{(7–4)}, 6–3
2024	(Argentina) Francisco Comesaña	(Argentina) Federico Coria	1–6, 7–6^{(9–7)}, 6–4
2023	(Argentina) Mariano Navone	(Argentina) Federico Coria	2–6, 6–3, 6–4
2022	(Argentina) Juan Manuel Cerúndolo	(Argentina) Camilo Ugo Carabelli	6–4, 2–6, 7–5
2021	(Argentina) Sebastián Báez	(Brazil) Thiago Monteiro	6–4, 6–0
2020	Not held		
2019	(India) Sumit Nagal	(Argentina) Facundo Bagnis	6–4, 6–2
2018	(Spain) Pablo Andújar	(Argentina) Pedro Cachin	6–3, 6–1
2017	(Argentina) Nicolás Kicker	(Argentina) Horacio Zeballos	6–7^{(5–7)}, 6–0, 7–5
2016	(Argentina) Renzo Olivo	(Argentina) Leonardo Mayer	2–6, 7–6^{(7–3)}, 7–6^{(7–3)}
2015	(United Kingdom) Kyle Edmund	(Argentina) Carlos Berlocq	6–0, 6–4
2014	Not held		
2013	(Uruguay) Pablo Cuevas	(Argentina) Facundo Argüello	7-6^{(8-6)}, 2–6, 6–4
2012	(Argentina) Diego Schwartzman	(France) Guillaume Rufin	6–1, 7–5
2011	(Argentina) Carlos Berlocq	(Portugal) Gastão Elias	6–1, 7–6^{(7–3)}
2010	(Argentina) Diego Junqueira	(Argentina) Juan Pablo Brzezicki	6–2, 6–1

=== Doubles ===
Year	Champion	Runner-up	Score
2026	(Argentina) Mariano Kestelboim (Argentina) Santiago Rodríguez Taverna	(Bolivia) Murkel Dellien (Bolivia) Federico Zeballos	6–4, 4–6, [10–5]
2025	(Argentina) Guillermo Durán (Argentina) Mariano Kestelboim	(Brazil) Pedro Boscardin Dias (Brazil) João Lucas Reis da Silva	7–6^{(7–3)}, 6–1
2024	(Bolivia) Murkel Dellien (Argentina) Facundo Mena	(Brazil) Felipe Meligeni Alves (Brazil) Marcelo Zormann	1–6, 6–2, [12–10]
2023	(Ecuador) Diego Hidalgo (Colombia) Cristian Rodríguez	(Brazil) Fernando Romboli (Brazil) Marcelo Zormann	6–3, 6–2
2022	(Argentina) Guido Andreozzi (Argentina) Guillermo Durán	(Argentina) Román Andrés Burruchaga (Argentina) Facundo Díaz Acosta	6–0, 7–5
2021	(Italy) Luciano Darderi (Argentina) Juan Bautista Torres	(Argentina) Hernán Casanova (Argentina) Santiago Rodríguez Taverna	7–6^{(7–5)}, 7–6^{(12–10)}
2020	Not held		
2019	(Argentina) Guido Andreozzi (2) (Argentina) Andrés Molteni	(Bolivia) Hugo Dellien (Bolivia) Federico Zeballos	6–7^{(3–7)}, 6–2, [10–1]
2018	(Argentina) Guido Andreozzi (Argentina) Guillermo Durán	(Brazil) Marcelo Demoliner (Argentina) Andrés Molteni	6–4, 4–6, [10–3]
2017	(Uruguay) Ariel Behar (Brazil) Fabiano de Paula	(Argentina) Máximo González (Brazil) Fabrício Neis	7–6^{(7–3)}, 5–7, [10–8]
2016	(Chile) Julio Peralta (2) (Argentina) Horacio Zeballos (3)	(Peru) Sergio Galdós (Brazil) Fernando Romboli	7–6^{(7–5)}, 7–6^{(7–1)}
2015	(Chile) Julio Peralta (Argentina) Horacio Zeballos (2)	(Argentina) Guido Andreozzi (Argentina) Lucas Arnold Ker	6–2, 7–5
2014	Not held		
2013	(Argentina) Máximo González (Argentina) Diego Sebastián Schwartzman	(Brazil) Rogério Dutra da Silva (Brazil) André Ghem	6–3, 7–5
2012	(Argentina) Martín Alund (Argentina) Horacio Zeballos	(Argentina) Facundo Argüello (Argentina) Agustín Velotti	7–6^{(8–6)}, 6–2
2011	(Argentina) Carlos Berlocq (2) (Argentina) Eduardo Schwank	(Uruguay) Marcel Felder (Czech Republic) Jaroslav Pospíšil	6–7^{(1–7)}, 6–4, [10–7]
2010	(Argentina) Carlos Berlocq (Argentina) Brian Dabul	(Argentina) Andrés Molteni (Argentina) Guido Pella	7–6^{(7–4)}, 6–3
