= 2022 República Dominicana Open – Singles =

Singles
- 2022 República Dominicana Open

Final
- Champion: (Argentina) Pedro Cachin
- Runner-up: (Argentina) Marco Trungelliti
- Score: 6–4, 2–6, 6–3

Events
Singles	Doubles
← 2019 ·	República Dominicana Open	· 2023 →

Juan Pablo Varillas was the defending champion but lost in the first round to Thiago Agustín Tirante.

Pedro Cachin won the title after defeating Marco Trungelliti 6–4, 2–6, 6–3 in the final.

== Seeds ==
1. (Spain) Roberto Carballés Baena (quarterfinals)
2. (Argentina) Pedro Cachin (champion)
3. (Argentina) Tomás Martín Etcheverry (semifinals)
4. (Colombia) Daniel Elahi Galán (semifinals)
5. (Peru) Juan Pablo Varillas (first round)
6. (Argentina) Camilo Ugo Carabelli (second round)
7. (Argentina) Federico Delbonis (second round)
8. (Argentina) Facundo Mena (quarterfinals)

== Draw ==
=== Key ===
- Q = Qualifier
- WC = Wild card
- LL = Lucky loser
- Alt = Alternate
- SE = Special exempt
- PR = Protected ranking
- ITF = ITF entry
- JE = Junior exempt
- w/o = Walkover
- r = Retired
- d = Defaulted
- SR = Special ranking

=== Finals ===
Semifinals
(Argentina) Marco Trungelliti	7	6
4	(Colombia) Daniel Elahi Galán	5	3
3	(Argentina) Tomás Martín Etcheverry	6	6^{5}	4
2	(Argentina) Pedro Cachin	4	7^{7}	6

Final
(Argentina) Marco Trungelliti	4	6	3
2	(Argentina) Pedro Cachin	6	2	6

=== Top half ===
First round
1	(Spain) R Carballés Baena	6	7
Alt	(Argentina) G Villanueva	0	5
(Bosnia and Herzegovina) D Džumhur	6	7
WC	(Dominican Republic) P Bertran	4	5
(Argentina) F Comesaña	1	2
(Argentina) M Trungelliti	6	6
(Brazil) D Dutra da Silva	6	1	3
7	(Argentina) F Delbonis	3	6	6
4	(Colombia) DE Galán	6	6
Q	(Argentina) Facundo Juárez	3	2
(Germany) C-M Stebe	6	2	6
(Argentina) GA Olivieri	3	6	2
WC	(Dominican Republic) N Hardt	6	6
Alt	(Chile) G Lama	2	2
(Argentina) TA Tirante	3	6	7
5	(Peru) JP Varillas	6	4	5

Second round
1	(Spain) R Carballés Baena	6	4
(Bosnia and Herzegovina) D Džumhur	4	0^{r}
(Argentina) M Trungelliti	6	6
7	(Argentina) F Delbonis	2	3
4	(Colombia) DE Galán	2	6	7^{13}
(Germany) C-M Stebe	6	4	6^{11}
WC	(Dominican Republic) N Hardt	2	4
(Argentina) TA Tirante	6	6

Quarterfinals
1	(Spain) R Carballés Baena	2	5
(Argentina) M Trungelliti	6	7
4	(Colombia) DE Galán	6	7^{7}
(Argentina) TA Tirante	3	6^{4}

Semifinals
(Argentina) M Trungelliti	7	6
4	(Colombia) DE Galán	5	3

=== Bottom half ===
First round
6	(Argentina) C Ugo Carabelli	6	6
(Italy) R Bonadio	2	3
(Argentina) R Olivo	6	4	7
WC	(Peru) G Bueno	2	6	5
Q	(Argentina) RA Burruchaga	6	2	6
Q	(Colombia) N Mejía	2	6	4
Q	(Brazil) P Boscardin Dias	0^{r}
3	(Argentina) TM Etcheverry	0
8	(Argentina) F Mena	7^{8}	4
Q	(United States) P Kypson	6^{6}	1^{r}
LL	(Peru) N Álvarez	7	4	6
Q	(Colombia) N Barrientos	5	6	3
(Italy) A Giannessi	1	5
Alt	(Ecuador) R Quiroz	6	1^{r}
(Austria) G Melzer	4	1
2	(Argentina) P Cachin	6	6

Second round
6	(Argentina) C Ugo Carabelli	3	4
(Argentina) R Olivo	6	6
Q	(Argentina) RA Burruchaga	4	3
3	(Argentina) TM Etcheverry	6	6
8	(Argentina) F Mena	6	6
LL	(Peru) N Álvarez	4	2
(Italy) A Giannessi	1	2
2	(Argentina) P Cachin	6	6

Quarterfinals
(Argentina) R Olivo	4	3
3	(Argentina) TM Etcheverry	6	6
8	(Argentina) F Mena	3	2
2	(Argentina) P Cachin	6	6

Semifinals
3	(Argentina) TM Etcheverry	6	6^{5}	4
2	(Argentina) P Cachin	4	7^{7}	6
