= 2016 Milex Open – Doubles =

Doubles
- 2016 Milex Open

Final
- Champions: (Uruguay) Ariel Behar (Ecuador) Giovanni Lapentti
- Runners-up: (France) Jonathan Eysseric (Croatia) Franko Škugor
- Score: 7–5 , 6–4

Events
Singles	Doubles
← 2015 ·	Milex Open	· 2017 →

Roberto Maytín and Hans Podlipnik-Castillo are the defending champions, but Maytín has partnered with Miguel Ángel Reyes-Varela and Podlipnik-Castillo has chosen not to participate . Roberto Maytín and Miguel Ángel Reyes-Varela are defeated by Ariel Behar and Giovanni Lapentti in the quarterfinals .

Ariel Behar and Giovanni Lapentti went on to win the title, defeating Jonathan Eysseric and Franko Škugor in the final 7–5, 6–4 .

== Seeds ==
1. (Chile) Julio Peralta / (Argentina) Horacio Zeballos (first round)
2. (India) Purav Raja / (South Africa) Ruan Roelofse (first round)
3. (Venezuela) Roberto Maytín / (Mexico) Miguel Ángel Reyes-Varela (quarterfinals)
4. (El Salvador) Marcelo Arévalo / (Peru) Sergio Galdós (quarterfinals)

== Draw ==
Key

- Q = Qualifier
- WC = Wild card
- LL = Lucky loser
- Alt = Alternate
- ITF = ITF entry
- PR = Protected ranking
- SR = Special ranking
- SE = Special exempt
- JE = Junior exempt
- JR = Junior Accelerator Programme entrant
- CO = College Accelerator Programme entrant
- NG = Next Gen Accelerator Program entrant
- w/o = Walkover
- r = Retired
- d = Defaulted

First round
1	(Chile) J Peralta (Argentina) H Zeballos	4	4
(France) J Eysseric (Croatia) F Škugor	6	6
(Colombia) A González (Venezuela) LD Martínez	7	6
(Brazil) A Ghem (Argentina) N Kicker	5	3
4	(El Salvador) M Arévalo (Peru) S Galdós	6	6
WC	(Chile) N Jarry (Dominican Republic) J Olivares	4	2
(Argentina) G Andreozzi (Dominican Republic) J Hernández-Fernández	6	1	[7]
WC	(Guatemala) C Díaz-Figueroa (Argentina) Maximiliano Estévez	2	6	[10]
(Uruguay) A Behar (Ecuador) G Lapentti	6	7
PR	(Spain) R Ramírez Hidalgo (Spain) P Riba	2	5
WC	(Dominican Republic) N Hardt (Germany) P Torebko	3	2
3	(Venezuela) R Maytín (Mexico) MÁ Reyes-Varela	6	6
(Spain) R Carballés Baena (Spain) O Roca Batalla	6	6
(Slovakia) J Kovalík (Slovakia) A Martin	3	4
(United States) J Cerretani (Romania) V Hănescu	6	1	[10]
2	(India) P Raja (South Africa) R Roelofse	4	6	[4]

Quarterfinals
(France) J Eysseric (Croatia) F Škugor	7	4	[10]
(Colombia) A González (Venezuela) LD Martínez	5	6	[8]
4	(El Salvador) M Arévalo (Peru) S Galdós	2	6	[6]
WC	(Guatemala) C Díaz-Figueroa (Argentina) M Estévez	6	3	[10]
(Uruguay) A Behar (Ecuador) G Lapentti	7	6
3	(Venezuela) R Maytín (Mexico) MÁ Reyes-Varela	5	4
(Spain) R Carballés Baena (Spain) O Roca Batalla	4	4
(United States) J Cerretani (Romania) V Hănescu	6	6

Semifinals
(France) J Eysseric (Croatia) F Škugor	6	4	[10]
WC	(Guatemala) C Díaz-Figueroa (Argentina) M Estévez	2	6	[3]
(Uruguay) A Behar (Ecuador) G Lapentti	6^{4}	6	[10]
(United States) J Cerretani (Romania) V Hănescu	7^{7}	4	[7]

Final
(France) J Eysseric (Croatia) F Škugor	5	4
(Uruguay) A Behar (Ecuador) G Lapentti	7	6
