= 2016 Milex Open =

- Date: 7 February – 15 February
- Edition: 2nd
- Draw: 32S / 16D
- Prize money: $50,000+H
- Surface: Green clay
- Location: Santo Domingo, Dominican Republic

Champions

Singles
- (Argentina) Guido Andreozzi

Doubles
- (Uruguay) Ariel Behar / (Ecuador) Giovanni Lapentti
← 2015 ·	Milex Open	· 2017 →

The 2016 Milex Open was a professional tennis tournament played on green clay courts. It was the second edition of the tournament which was part of the 2016 ATP Challenger Tour. It took place in Santo Domingo, Dominican Republic between 8 February and 14 February 2016.

== Singles main draw entrants ==
=== Seeds ===
Country	Player	Rank^{1}	Seed
DOM	Víctor Estrella Burgos	58	1
ARG	Horacio Zeballos	118	2
AUT	Gerald Melzer	120	3
ESP	Roberto Carballés Baena	129	4
SVK	Andrej Martin	141	5
COL	Alejandro González	151	6
BRA	André Ghem	153	7
BRA	João Souza	154	8

- ^{1} Rankings were as of February 1, 2016.

=== Other entrants ===
The following players received wildcards into the singles main draw:

- (Ecuador) Emilio Gómez
- (Dominican Republic) Nick Hardt
- (Chile) Nicolás Jarry
- (Dominican Republic) José Olivares

The following players received entry into the singles main draw as alternates:

- (Croatia) Franko Škugor
- (Brazil) João Souza

The following players received entry from the qualifying draw:

- (Spain) Pere Riba
- (Barbados) Darian King
- (Chile) Gonzalo Lama
- (Ecuador) Roberto Quiroz

== Champions ==
=== Singles ===
- (Argentina) Guido Andreozzi def. (Argentina) Nicolás Kicker, 6–0, 6–4

=== Doubles ===
- (Uruguay) Ariel Behar / (Ecuador) Giovanni Lapentti def. (France) Jonathan Eysseric / (Croatia) Franko Škugor, 7–5, 6–4
