= 2024 RD Open – Singles =

Singles
- 2024 RD Open

Final
- Champion: (Bosnia and Herzegovina) Damir Džumhur
- Runner-up: (Ecuador) Andrés Andrade
- Score: 6–4, 6–4

Events
Singles	Doubles
← 2023 ·	RD Open	· 2025 →

Genaro Alberto Olivieri was the defending champion but chose not to defend his title.

Damir Džumhur won the title after defeating Andrés Andrade 6–4, 6–4 in the final.

== Seeds ==
1. (Argentina) Federico Coria (first round)
2. (Argentina) Camilo Ugo Carabelli (second round, withdrew)
3. (Bosnia and Herzegovina) Damir Džumhur (champion)
4. (Serbia) Laslo Djere (semifinals)
5. (Chinese Taipei) Tseng Chun-hsin (quarterfinals)
6. (Brazil) Felipe Meligeni Alves (quarterfinals)
7. (Bolivia) Murkel Dellien (second round)
8. (Dominican Republic) Nick Hardt (first round)

== Draw ==
=== Key ===
- Q = Qualifier
- WC = Wild card
- LL = Lucky loser
- Alt = Alternate
- ITF = ITF entry
- PR = Protected ranking
- SR = Special ranking
- SE = Special exempt
- JE = Junior exempt
- JR = Junior Accelerator Programme entrant
- CO = College Accelerator Programme entrant
- NG = Next Gen Accelerator Program entrant
- w/o = Walkover
- r = Retired
- d = Defaulted

=== Finals ===
Semifinals
LL	(Ecuador) Andrés Andrade	2	7^{7}	7^{7}
4	(Serbia) Laslo Djere	6	6^{5}	6^{5}
3	(Bosnia and Herzegovina) Damir Džumhur	6	6
(Argentina) Renzo Olivo	4	2

Final
LL	(Ecuador) Andrés Andrade	4	4
3	(Bosnia and Herzegovina) Damir Džumhur	6	6

=== Top half ===
First round
1	(Argentina) F Coria	4	1
LL	(Ecuador) A Andrade	6	6
(Brazil) P Sakamoto	3	6	2
Alt	(Bolivia) JC Prado Ángelo	6	4	6
(United Kingdom) J Clarke	6	6
Q	(New Zealand) K Pannu	3	1
(Australia) B Tomic	2	6	6
8	(Dominican Republic) N Hardt	6	4	3
4	(Serbia) L Djere	7^{7}	7^{7}
(France) M Janvier	6^{3}	6^{5}
(Peru) I Buse	6	6
Q	(United States) Christian Langmo	4	0
WC	(Mexico) R Pacheco Méndez	3	4
Q	(United States) R Seggerman	6	6
(Canada) A Galarneau	6^{5}	6	1
7	(Bolivia) M Dellien	7^{7}	3	6

Second round
LL	(Ecuador) A Andrade	6	6
Alt	(Bolivia) JC Prado Ángelo	4	4
(United Kingdom) J Clarke	6^{5}	3
(Australia) B Tomic	7^{7}	6
4	(Serbia) L Djere	4	6	6
(Peru) I Buse	6	3	2
Q	(United States) R Seggerman	4	7^{7}	7^{8}
7	(Bolivia) M Dellien	6	6^{2}	6^{6}

Quarterfinals
LL	(Ecuador) A Andrade	6	6
(Australia) B Tomic	2	2
4	(Serbia) L Djere	6	6
Q	(United States) R Seggerman	2	1

Semifinals
LL	(Ecuador) A Andrade	2	7^{7}	7^{7}
4	(Serbia) L Djere	6	6^{5}	6^{5}

=== Bottom half ===
First round
5	(Chinese Taipei) C-h Tseng	6	0
SE	(Brazil) M Alves	1	0^{r}
WC	(Dominican Republic) P Bertran	3	2
(Argentina) JP Ficovich	6	6
(Kazakhstan) D Popko	6	6
(United States) T-S Kwiatkowski	1	2
Q	(United States) C Kingsley	5	5
3	(Bosnia and Herzegovina) D Džumhur	7	7
6	(Brazil) F Meligeni Alves	6	6
(Colombia) N Mejía	4	3
Q	(Argentina) M Kestelboim	6	6
(Argentina) P Cachín	3	3
(Argentina) R Olivo	7	6
Q	(Canada) L Draxl	5	3
WC	(Dominican Republic) R Cid Subervi	6^{2}	5
2	(Argentina) C Ugo Carabelli	7^{7}	7

Second round
5	(Chinese Taipei) C-h Tseng	6	6
(Argentina) JP Ficovich	1	2
(Kazakhstan) D Popko	6	3	4
3	(Bosnia and Herzegovina) D Džumhur	1	6	6
6	(Brazil) F Meligeni Alves	6	6
Q	(Argentina) M Kestelboim	4	4
(Argentina) R Olivo	w/o
2	(Argentina) C Ugo Carabelli

Quarterfinals
5	(Chinese Taipei) C-h Tseng	4	6^{4}
3	(Bosnia and Herzegovina) D Džumhur	6	7^{7}
6	(Brazil) F Meligeni Alves	1	3
(Argentina) R Olivo	6	6

Semifinals
3	(Bosnia and Herzegovina) D Džumhur	6	6
(Argentina) R Olivo	4	2
