= 2022 República Dominicana Open =

- Date: 15–21 August
- Edition: 6th
- Draw: 32S / 16D
- Surface: Clay (green)
- Location: Santo Domingo, Dominican Republic

Champions

Singles
- (Argentina) Pedro Cachin

Doubles
- (Philippines) Ruben Gonzales / (United States) Reese Stalder
← 2019 ·	República Dominicana Open	· 2023 →

The 2022 República Dominicana Open was a professional tennis tournament played on green clay courts. It was the sixth edition of the tournament which was part of the 2022 ATP Challenger Tour. It took place in Santo Domingo, Dominican Republic between 15 and 21 August 2022.

== Singles main-draw entrants ==
=== Seeds ===
Country	Player	Rank^{1}	Seed
ESP	Roberto Carballés Baena	78	1
ARG	Pedro Cachin	87	2
ARG	Tomás Martín Etcheverry	94	3
COL	Daniel Elahi Galán	97	4
PER	Juan Pablo Varillas	100	5
ARG	Camilo Ugo Carabelli	121	6
ARG	Federico Delbonis	133	7
ARG	Facundo Mena	138	8

- ^{1} Rankings were as of 8 August 2022.

=== Other entrants ===
The following players received wildcards into the singles main draw:

- (Dominican Republic) Peter Bertran
- (Peru) Gonzalo Bueno
- (Dominican Republic) Nick Hardt

The following players received entry into the singles main draw as alternates:

- (Chile) Gonzalo Lama
- (Ecuador) Roberto Quiroz
- (Argentina) Gonzalo Villanueva

The following players received entry from the qualifying draw:

- (Colombia) Nicolás Barrientos
- (Brazil) Pedro Boscardin Dias
- (Argentina) Román Andrés Burruchaga
- (Argentina) Facundo Juárez
- (United States) Patrick Kypson
- (Colombia) Nicolás Mejía

The following player received entry as a lucky loser:

- (Peru) Nicolás Álvarez

== Champions ==
=== Singles ===
- (Argentina) Pedro Cachin def. (Argentina) Marco Trungelliti 6–4, 2–6, 6–3.

=== Doubles ===
- (Philippines) Ruben Gonzales / (United States) Reese Stalder def. (Colombia) Nicolás Barrientos / (Mexico) Miguel Ángel Reyes-Varela 7–6^{(7–5)}, 6–3.
