= 2017 Milex Open – Singles =

Singles
- 2017 Milex Open

Final
- Champion: (Dominican Republic) Víctor Estrella Burgos
- Runner-up: (Bosnia and Herzegovina) Damir Džumhur
- Score: 7–6^{(7–4)}, 6–4

Events
Singles	Doubles
← 2016 ·	Milex Open	· 2018 →

Guido Andreozzi was the defending champion but chose not to defend his title.

Víctor Estrella Burgos won the title after defeating Damir Džumhur 7–6^{(7–4)}, 6–4 in the final.

== Seeds ==
1. (Bosnia and Herzegovina) Damir Džumhur (final)
2. (Spain) Nicolás Almagro (second round)
3. (Argentina) Guido Pella (quarterfinals)
4. (Dominican Republic) Víctor Estrella Burgos (champion)
5. (Norway) Casper Ruud (quarterfinals)
6. (Colombia) Santiago Giraldo (second round, retired)
7. (Chile) Nicolás Jarry (semifinals)
8. (Portugal) Gastão Elias (semifinals)

== Draw ==
=== Key ===
- Q = Qualifier
- WC = Wild card
- LL = Lucky loser
- Alt = Alternate
- SE = Special exempt
- PR = Protected ranking
- ITF = ITF entry
- JE = Junior exempt
- w/o = Walkover
- r = Retired
- d = Defaulted
- SR = Special ranking

=== Finals ===
Semifinals
1	(Bosnia and Herzegovina) Damir Džumhur	6	7^{7}
7	(Chile) Nicolás Jarry	3	6^{1}
4	(Dominican Republic) Víctor Estrella Burgos	6	1	7^{7}
8	(Portugal) Gastão Elias	4	6	6^{5}

Final
1	(Bosnia and Herzegovina) Damir Džumhur	6^{4}	4
4	(Dominican Republic) Víctor Estrella Burgos	7^{7}	6

=== Top half ===
First round
1	(Bosnia and Herzegovina) D Džumhur	7^{7}	6
(Brazil) G Clezar	6^{5}	3
SE	(Argentina) F Argüello	3	0^{r}
Q	(Spain) Carlos Boluda-Purkiss	6	0
Alt	(United States) E King	7	7
(Argentina) A Collarini	5	5
WC	(Dominican Republic) N Hardt	1	0
6	(Colombia) S Giraldo	6	6
3	(Argentina) G Pella	7^{7}	6
(Argentina) M Trungelliti	6^{2}	1
(France) G Mina	4	6	6
(Brazil) C Zampieri	6	1	3
(Austria) M Linzer	6	4	7
(Colombia) DE Galán	3	6	5
WC	(United States) Charles Force	2	3
7	(Chile) N Jarry	6	6

Second round
1	(Bosnia and Herzegovina) D Džumhur	6	6
Q	(Spain) C Boluda-Purkiss	2	2
Alt	(United States) E King	6	4
6	(Colombia) S Giraldo	2	3^{r}
3	(Argentina) G Pella	6	6
(France) G Mina	1	3
(Austria) M Linzer	5	1
7	(Chile) N Jarry	7	6

Quarterfinals
1	(Bosnia and Herzegovina) D Džumhur	6	6
Alt	(United States) E King	1	0
3	(Argentina) G Pella	2	6^{5}
7	(Chile) N Jarry	6	7^{7}

Semifinals
1	(Bosnia and Herzegovina) D Džumhur	6	7^{7}
7	(Chile) N Jarry	3	6^{1}

=== Bottom half ===
First round
5	(Norway) C Ruud	6	6^{5}	6
WC	(Dominican Republic) R Cid Subervi	3	7^{7}	3
(Dominican Republic) J Hernández-Fernández	2	3
LL	(Japan) K Uchida	6	6
(France) C Hemery	6	6^{5}	2
(Brazil) JP Sorgi	1	7^{7}	6
(Netherlands) T Griekspoor	6	5	4
4	(Dominican Republic) V Estrella Burgos	3	7	6
8	(Portugal) G Elias	6	5
(New Zealand) J Statham	1	1^{r}
Q	(Argentina) JI Londero	6	6
WC	(Dominican Republic) J Olivares	4	2
Q	(Colombia) C Rodríguez	6	7
(Colombia) A Falla	1	5
Q	(Chile) Jorge Montero	5	4
2	(Spain) N Almagro	7	6

Second round
5	(Norway) C Ruud	6	6
LL	(Japan) K Uchida	4	2
(Brazil) JP Sorgi	5	3
4	(Dominican Republic) V Estrella Burgos	7	6
8	(Portugal) G Elias	6	6
Q	(Argentina) JI Londero	4	2
Q	(Colombia) C Rodríguez	6	6
2	(Spain) N Almagro	2	2

Quarterfinals
5	(Norway) C Ruud	3	3
4	(Dominican Republic) V Estrella Burgos	6	6
8	(Portugal) G Elias	3	6	6
Q	(Colombia) C Rodríguez	6	3	0

Semifinals
4	(Dominican Republic) V Estrella Burgos	6	1	7^{7}
8	(Portugal) G Elias	4	6	6^{5}
