= 2026 CIT Open – Singles =

Singles
- 2026 CIT Open

Final
- Champion: (Dominican Republic) Nick Hardt
- Runner-up: (Argentina) Juan Estévez
- Score: 7–6^{(7–0)}, 4–6, 6–2

Events
Singles	Doubles
- CIT Open

This was the first edition of the tournament.

Nick Hardt won the title after defeating Juan Estévez 7–6^{(7–0)}, 4–6, 6–2 in the final.

== Seeds ==
1. (Argentina) Guido Iván Justo (semifinals)
2. (Argentina) Juan Bautista Torres (first round)
3. (Argentina) Juan Manuel La Serna (quarterfinals)
4. (Brazil) Thiago Seyboth Wild (second round)
5. (Chile) Matías Soto (quarterfinals)
6. (Argentina) Nicolás Kicker (second round)
7. (Argentina) Santiago Rodríguez Taverna (second round)
8. (Argentina) Juan Estévez (final)

== Draw ==
Key

- Q = Qualifier
- WC = Wild card
- LL = Lucky loser
- Alt = Alternate
- ITF = ITF entry
- PR = Protected ranking
- SR = Special ranking
- SE = Special exempt
- JE = Junior exempt
- JR = Junior Accelerator Programme entrant
- CO = College Accelerator Programme entrant
- NG = Next Gen Accelerator Program entrant
- w/o = Walkover
- r = Retired
- d = Defaulted

=== Finals ===
Semifinals
1	(Argentina) Guido Iván Justo	2	6^{11}
(Dominican Republic) Nick Hardt	6	7^{13}
Q	(Peru) Conner Huertas del Pino	6	5	4
8	(Argentina) Juan Estévez	4	7	6

Final
(Dominican Republic) Nick Hardt	7^{7}	4	6
8	(Argentina) Juan Estévez	6^{0}	6	2

=== Top half ===
First round
1	(Argentina) GI Justo	6	6
(Mexico) A Hernández	0	1
(Argentina) Carlos María Zárate	6	1	5
(Colombia) JS Gómez	2	6	7
Q	(Colombia) Samuel Heredia	7^{8}	3	2
(Argentina) LE Ambrogi	6^{6}	6	6
Q	(Venezuela) Ignacio Parisca	1	1
7	(Argentina) S Rodríguez Taverna	6	6
4	(Brazil) T Seyboth Wild	6	6
WC	(Paraguay) Santino Núñez	2	2
(Brazil) Bruno Fernandez	6	3	3
(Dominican Republic) N Hardt	3	6	6
Alt	(Argentina) S de la Fuente	3	6	7^{8}
(Brazil) PA Saraiva dos Santos	6	3	6^{6}
SE	(Colombia) Johan Alexander Rodríguez	6^{4}	1
5	(Chile) M Soto	7^{7}	6

Second round
1	(Argentina) GI Justo	6	6
(Colombia) JS Gómez	1	1
(Argentina) LE Ambrogi	6	6
7	(Argentina) S Rodríguez Taverna	4	4
4	(Brazil) T Seyboth Wild	4	6	5
(Dominican Republic) N Hardt	6	3	7
Alt	(Argentina) S de la Fuente	2	6	5
5	(Chile) M Soto	6	2	7

Quarterfinals
1	(Argentina) GI Justo	6	6
(Argentina) LE Ambrogi	3	0
(Dominican Republic) N Hardt	3	6	6
5	(Chile) M Soto	6	1	0

Semifinals
1	(Argentina) GI Justo	2	6^{11}
(Dominican Republic) N Hardt	6	7^{13}

=== Bottom half ===
First round
6	(Argentina) N Kicker	7	6
WC	(Argentina) F Coria	5	3
Q	(Peru) C Huertas del Pino	6	6
Q	(Argentina) Máximo Zeitune	4	1
(Argentina) Lorenzo Joaquín Rodríguez	1	2
(Brazil) E Ribeiro	6	6
Q	(Argentina) Ignacio Monzón	3	4
3	(Argentina) JM La Serna	6	6
8	(Argentina) Juan Estévez	6	6
Alt	(Colombia) Samuel Alejandro Linde Palacios	1	2
WC	(Paraguay) Hernando José Escurra Isnardi	0	5
(Argentina) H Casanova	6	7
(Uruguay) J Aguilar Cardozo	6^{4}	6	6
Q	(Brazil) Gustavo Ribeiro de Almeida	7^{7}	2	3
(Argentina) G Villanueva	7	6^{10}	6
2	(Argentina) JB Torres	5	7^{12}	3

Second round
6	(Argentina) N Kicker	4	6^{0}
Q	(Peru) C Huertas del Pino	6	7^{7}
(Brazil) E Ribeiro	3	6^{5}
3	(Argentina) JM La Serna	6	7^{7}
8	(Argentina) J Estévez	6	6
(Argentina) H Casanova	3	1
(Uruguay) J Aguilar Cardozo	0	5
(Argentina) G Villanueva	6	7

Quarterfinals
Q	(Peru) C Huertas del Pino	6	7
3	(Argentina) JM La Serna	4	5
8	(Argentina) J Estévez	6	6
(Argentina) G Villanueva	2	3

Semifinals
Q	(Peru) C Huertas del Pino	6	5	4
8	(Argentina) J Estévez	4	7	6
