= 2017 Milex Open =

- Date: 14–19 August
- Edition: 3rd
- Draw: 32S / 16D
- Surface: Green clay
- Location: Santo Domingo, Dominican Republic

Champions

Singles
- (Dominican Republic) Víctor Estrella Burgos

Doubles
- (Argentina) Juan Ignacio Londero / (Venezuela) Luis David Martínez
← 2016 ·	Milex Open	· 2018 →

The 2017 Milex Open was a professional tennis tournament played on green clay courts. It was the third edition of the tournament which was part of the 2017 ATP Challenger Tour. It took place in Santo Domingo, Dominican Republic between 14 and 19 August 2017.

== Singles main-draw entrants ==
=== Seeds ===
Country	Player	Rank^{1}	Seed
BIH	Damir Džumhur	73	1
ESP	Nicolás Almagro	81	2
ARG	Guido Pella	92	3
DOM	Víctor Estrella Burgos	107	4
NOR	Casper Ruud	111	5
COL	Santiago Giraldo	118	6
CHI	Nicolás Jarry	138	7
POR	Gastão Elias	173	8

- ^{1} Rankings were as of 7 August 2017.

=== Other entrants ===
The following players received wildcards into the singles main draw:

- (Dominican Republic) Roberto Cid Subervi
- (United States) Charles Force
- (Dominican Republic) Nick Hardt
- (Dominican Republic) José Olivares

The following player received entry into the singles main draw as a special exempt:

- (Argentina) Facundo Argüello

The following player received entry into the singles main draw as an alternate:

- (United States) Evan King

The following players received entry from the qualifying draw:

- (Spain) Carlos Boluda-Purkiss
- (Argentina) Juan Ignacio Londero
- (Chile) Jorge Montero
- (Colombia) Cristian Rodríguez

The following player received entry as a lucky loser:

- (Japan) Kaichi Uchida

== Champions ==
=== Singles ===
- (Dominican Republic) Víctor Estrella Burgos def. (Bosnia and Herzegovina) Damir Džumhur 7–6^{(7–4)}, 6–4.

=== Doubles ===
- (Argentina) Juan Ignacio Londero / (Venezuela) Luis David Martínez def. (Colombia) Daniel Elahi Galán / (Colombia) Santiago Giraldo 6–4, 6–4.
