= 2022 República Dominicana Open – Doubles =

Doubles
- 2022 República Dominicana Open

Final
- Champions: (Philippines) Ruben Gonzales (United States) Reese Stalder
- Runners-up: (Colombia) Nicolás Barrientos (Mexico) Miguel Ángel Reyes-Varela
- Score: 7–6^{(7–5)}, 6–3

Events
Singles	Doubles
- República Dominicana Open

Ariel Behar and Gonzalo Escobar were the defending champions but chose not to defend their title.

Ruben Gonzales and Reese Stalder won the title after defeating Nicolás Barrientos and Miguel Ángel Reyes-Varela 7–6^{(7–5)}, 6–3 in the final.

== Seeds ==
1. (Colombia) Nicolás Barrientos / (Mexico) Miguel Ángel Reyes-Varela (final)
2. (United States) Evan King / (United States) Nicholas Monroe (first round)
3. (Venezuela) Luis David Martínez / (Colombia) Nicolás Mejía (first round)
4. (Ecuador) Roberto Quiroz / (Colombia) Cristian Rodríguez (withdrew)

== Draw ==
Key

- Q = Qualifier
- WC = Wild card
- LL = Lucky loser
- Alt = Alternate
- ITF = ITF entry
- PR = Protected ranking
- SR = Special ranking
- SE = Special exempt
- JE = Junior exempt
- JR = Junior Accelerator Programme entrant
- CO = College Accelerator Programme entrant
- NG = Next Gen Accelerator Program entrant
- w/o = Walkover
- r = Retired
- d = Defaulted

First round
1	(Colombia) N Barrientos (Mexico) MÁ Reyes-Varela	6	7
(Peru) S Galdós (Greece) Pe Tsitsipas	3	5
Alt	(Colombia) JS Gómez (Colombia) Alejandro Hoyos	1	2
(Argentina) P Cachin (Argentina) C Ugo Carabelli	6	6
WC	(Argentina) RA Burruchaga (Dominican Republic) N Hardt	6	5	[10]
(Argentina) Facundo Juárez (Argentina) F Mena	3	7	[7]
(India) P Raja (India) D Sharan	7^{7}	6^{4}	[6]
WC	(Dominican Republic) P Bertran (Dominican Republic) V Estrella Burgos	6^{4}	7^{7}	[10]
(Philippines) R Gonzales (United States) R Stalder	6	6
3	(Venezuela) LD Martínez (Colombia) N Mejía	4	3
(Argentina) TM Etcheverry (Argentina) GA Olivieri	4	6	[10]
(Argentina) R Olivo (Argentina) TA Tirante	6	3	[6]
(Brazil) D Dutra da Silva (Peru) A Merino	6	7^{7}
2	(United States) E King (United States) N Monroe	4	6^{3}

Quarterfinals
1	(Colombia) N Barrientos (Mexico) MÁ Reyes-Varela	w/o
(Argentina) P Cachin (Argentina) C Ugo Carabelli
(Italy) R Bonadio (Italy) A Giannessi
WC	(Argentina) RA Burruchaga (Dominican Republic) N Hardt	w/o
WC	(Dominican Republic) P Bertran (Dominican Republic) V Estrella Burgos	2	6^{2}
(Philippines) R Gonzales (United States) R Stalder	6	7^{7}
(Argentina) TM Etcheverry (Argentina) GA Olivieri
(Brazil) D Dutra da Silva (Peru) A Merino	w/o

Semifinals
1	(Colombia) N Barrientos (Mexico) MÁ Reyes-Varela	3
WC	(Argentina) RA Burruchaga (Dominican Republic) N Hardt	1^{r}
(Philippines) R Gonzales (United States) R Stalder	w/o
(Brazil) D Dutra da Silva (Peru) A Merino

Final
1	(Colombia) N Barrientos (Mexico) MÁ Reyes-Varela	6^{5}	3
(Philippines) R Gonzales (United States) R Stalder	7^{7}	6
