= 2019 Milex Open =

- Date: 7–13 October
- Edition: 5th
- Draw: 48S / 16D
- Surface: Clay (green)
- Location: Santo Domingo, Dominican Republic

Champions

Singles
- (Peru) Juan Pablo Varillas

Doubles
- (Uruguay) Ariel Behar / (Ecuador) Gonzalo Escobar
- Milex Open

The 2019 Milex Open was a professional tennis tournament played on green clay courts. It was the fifth edition of the tournament which was part of the 2019 ATP Challenger Tour. It took place in Santo Domingo, Dominican Republic between 7 and 13 October 2019.

== Singles main-draw entrants ==
=== Seeds ===
Country	Player	Rank^{1}	Seed
ARG	Federico Delbonis	74	1
BOL	Hugo Dellien	85	2
ARG	Leonardo Mayer	97	3
BRA	Thiago Monteiro	105	4
ARG	Guido Andreozzi	111	5
IND	Sumit Nagal	135	6
ARG	Facundo Bagnis	150	7
ARG	Federico Coria	154	8
ITA	Federico Gaio	155	9
ESP	Pedro Martínez	157	10
ITA	Alessandro Giannessi	166	11
ESP	Mario Vilella Martínez	182	12
ARG	Facundo Mena	198	13
SRB	Peđa Krstin	200	14
ARG	Andrea Collarini	204	15
COL	Daniel Elahi Galán	206	16

- ^{1} Rankings were as of 30 September 2019.

=== Other entrants ===
The following players received wildcards into the singles main draw:

- (Dominican Republic) Peter Bertran
- (Dominican Republic) Víctor Estrella Burgos
- (Spain) Carlos Gómez-Herrera
- (Dominican Republic) Nick Hardt
- (Dominican Republic) José Olivares

The following player received entry into the singles main draw as an alternate:

- (Colombia) Alejandro González

== Champions ==
=== Singles ===
- (Peru) Juan Pablo Varillas def. (Argentina) Federico Coria 6–3, 2–6, 6–2.

=== Doubles ===
- (Uruguay) Ariel Behar / (Ecuador) Gonzalo Escobar def. (Brazil) Orlando Luz / (Venezuela) Luis David Martínez 6–7^{(5–7)}, 6–4, [12–10].
