= 2019 Milex Open – Singles =

Singles
- 2019 Milex Open

Final
- Champion: (Peru) Juan Pablo Varillas
- Runner-up: (Argentina) Federico Coria
- Score: 6–3, 2–6, 6–2

Events
Singles	Doubles
- Milex Open

Cristian Garín was the defending champion but chose not to defend his title.

Juan Pablo Varillas won the title after defeating Federico Coria 6–3, 2–6, 6–2 in the final.

== Seeds ==
All seeds receive a bye into the second round.

1. (Argentina) Federico Delbonis (third round)
2. (Bolivia) Hugo Dellien (semifinals)
3. (Argentina) Leonardo Mayer (second round)
4. (Brazil) Thiago Monteiro (semifinals)
5. (Argentina) Guido Andreozzi (third round, retired)
6. (India) Sumit Nagal (second round, retired)
7. (Argentina) Facundo Bagnis (quarterfinals)
8. (Argentina) Federico Coria (final)
9. (Italy) Federico Gaio (third round)
10. (Spain) Pedro Martínez (second round)
11. (Italy) Alessandro Giannessi (quarterfinals)
12. (Spain) Mario Vilella Martínez (third round)
13. (Argentina) Facundo Mena (second round)
14. (Serbia) Peđa Krstin (second round)
15. (Argentina) Andrea Collarini (third round)
16. (Colombia) Daniel Elahi Galán (second round)

== Draw ==
Key

- Q = Qualifier
- WC = Wild card
- LL = Lucky loser
- Alt = Alternate
- ITF = ITF entry
- PR = Protected ranking
- SR = Special ranking
- SE = Special exempt
- JE = Junior exempt
- JR = Junior Accelerator Programme entrant
- CO = College Accelerator Programme entrant
- NG = Next Gen Accelerator Program entrant
- w/o = Walkover
- r = Retired
- d = Defaulted

=== Finals ===
Quarterfinals
(Peru) Juan Pablo Varillas	6	6
7	(Argentina) Facundo Bagnis	3	3
4	(Brazil) Thiago Monteiro	6	6
(Chile) Alejandro Tabilo	3	2
8	(Argentina) Federico Coria	6	6
(Brazil) Guilherme Clezar	2	3
11	(Italy) Alessandro Giannessi	3	1
2	(Bolivia) Hugo Dellien	6	6

Semifinals
(Peru) Juan Pablo Varillas	6	6
4	(Brazil) Thiago Monteiro	4	2
8	(Argentina) Federico Coria	6	6
2	(Bolivia) Hugo Dellien	3	1

Final
(Peru) Juan Pablo Varillas	6	2	6
8	(Argentina) Federico Coria	3	6	2

=== Top half ===
==== Section 1 ====
First round
(Italy) GM Moroni	6	6
(Ecuador) G Escobar	3	1
Alt	(Colombia) A González	2	5
(Peru) JP Varillas	6	7
WC	(Dominican Republic) N Hardt	2	6	1
(Argentina) R Olivo	6	3	6
(Argentina) P Cachin	6^{8}	3
(Ecuador) D Hidalgo	7^{10}	6

Second round
1	(Argentina) F Delbonis	3	7^{7}	7
(Italy) GM Moroni	6	6^{4}	5
(Peru) JP Varillas	6	6
16	(Colombia) DE Galán	2	3
9	(Italy) F Gaio	6	1
(Argentina) R Olivo	4	0^{r}
(Ecuador) D Hidalgo	3	2
7	(Argentina) F Bagnis	6	6

Third round
1	(Argentina) F Delbonis	6	3	4
(Peru) JP Varillas	3	6	6
9	(Italy) F Gaio	6^{4}	2
7	(Argentina) F Bagnis	7^{7}	6

Quarterfinals
(Peru) JP Varillas	6	6
7	(Argentina) F Bagnis	3	3

==== Section 2 ====
First round
WC	(Dominican Republic) V Estrella Burgos	7	7
(El Salvador) M Arévalo	5	5
(Brazil) Oscar José Gutierrez	4	6	4
(Portugal) G Elias	6	3	4^{r}
(Germany) Jeremy Jahn	6	4	0^{r}
(France) M Hamou	2	6	2
WC	(Spain) C Gómez-Herrera	4	4
(Chile) A Tabilo	6	6

Second round
4	(Brazil) T Monteiro	6	6
WC	(Dominican Republic) V Estrella Burgos	2	2
(Brazil) OJ Gutierrez	7	6
14	(Serbia) P Krstin	5	4
12	(Spain) M Vilella Martínez	6	6
(France) M Hamou	2	1
(Chile) A Tabilo	6^{5}	6	2
6	(India) S Nagal	7^{7}	0	0^{r}

Third round
4	(Brazil) T Monteiro	6	7
(Brazil) OJ Gutierrez	3	5
12	(Spain) M Vilella Martínez	6	0	3
(Chile) A Tabilo	3	6	6

Quarterfinals
4	(Brazil) T Monteiro	6	6
(Chile) A Tabilo	3	2

=== Bottom half ===
==== Section 3 ====
First round
(Dominican Republic) J Hernández-Fernández	6	6
(France) M Chazal	1	3
(Bolivia) F Zeballos	2	6	6
WC	(Dominican Republic) P Bertran	6	1	1
(Brazil) J Menezes	6	7^{7}
(Brazil) P Sakamoto	2	6^{3}
(Argentina) JP Ficovich	4	3
(Brazil) G Clezar	6	6

Second round
8	(Argentina) F Coria	6	6
(Dominican Republic) J Hernández-Fernández	4	1
(Bolivia) F Zeballos	1	7	6
10	(Spain) P Martínez	6	5	4
13	(Argentina) F Mena	2	6	0
(Brazil) J Menezes	6	4	6
(Brazil) G Clezar	6	1	7^{7}
3	(Argentina) L Mayer	3	6	6^{5}

Third round
8	(Argentina) F Coria	7^{7}	6
(Bolivia) F Zeballos	6^{2}	3
(Brazil) J Menezes	3	2
(Brazil) G Clezar	6	6

Quarterfinals
8	(Argentina) F Coria	6	6
(Brazil) G Clezar	2	3

==== Section 4 ====
First round
(Dominican Republic) R Cid Subervi	6	3	1
(Brazil) O Luz	2	6	6
WC	(Dominican Republic) J Olivares	3	4
(Brazil) T Seyboth Wild	6	6
(Peru) N Álvarez	6	6
(United States) Jordi Arconada	3	0
(Argentina) G Villanueva	4	6	6
(Argentina) A Molteni	6	4	2

Second round
5	(Argentina) G Andreozzi	6	6
(Brazil) O Luz	4	3
(Brazil) T Seyboth Wild	1	4
11	(Italy) A Giannessi	6	6
15	(Argentina) A Collarini	6^{4}	6	6
(Peru) N Álvarez	7^{7}	4	1
(Argentina) G Villanueva	2	3
2	(Bolivia) H Dellien	6	6

Third round
5	(Argentina) G Andreozzi	6	6^{r}
11	(Italy) A Giannessi	3	6
15	(Argentina) A Collarini	4	4
2	(Bolivia) H Dellien	6	6

Quarterfinals
11	(Italy) A Giannessi	3	1
2	(Bolivia) H Dellien	6	6
