= 2026 CIT Open – Doubles =

Doubles
- 2026 CIT Open

Final
- Champions: (Uruguay) Joaquín Aguilar Cardozo (Argentina) Santiago de la Fuente
- Runners-up: (Peru) Arklon Huertas del Pino (Peru) Conner Huertas del Pino
- Score: 7–6^{(7–4)}, 6–3

Events
Singles	Doubles
- CIT Open

This was the first edition of the tournament.

Joaquín Aguilar Cardozo and Santiago de la Fuente won the title after defeating Arklon and Conner Huertas del Pino 7–6^{(7–4)}, 6–3 in the final.

== Seeds ==
1. (Brazil) Eduardo Ribeiro / (Bolivia) Federico Zeballos (semifinals)
2. (Argentina) Valentín Basel / (Uruguay) Ignacio Carou (quarterfinals)
3. (Brazil) Bruno Oliveira / (Brazil) Paulo André Saraiva dos Santos (first round)
4. (Brazil) Luís Britto / (Argentina) Gonzalo Villanueva (first round)

== Draw ==
Key

- Q = Qualifier
- WC = Wild card
- LL = Lucky loser
- Alt = Alternate
- ITF = ITF entry
- PR = Protected ranking
- SR = Special ranking
- SE = Special exempt
- JE = Junior exempt
- JR = Junior Accelerator Programme entrant
- CO = College Accelerator Programme entrant
- NG = Next Gen Accelerator Program entrant
- w/o = Walkover
- r = Retired
- d = Defaulted

First round
1	(Brazil) E Ribeiro (Bolivia) F Zeballos	w/o
(Argentina) N Kicker (Argentina) Ignacio Monzón
(Argentina) H Casanova (Argentina) S Rodríguez Taverna	7	6
(Argentina) Thiago Cigarrán (Argentina) Lorenzo Joaquín Rodríguez	5	4
4	(Brazil) L Britto (Argentina) G Villanueva	5	5
(Peru) A Huertas del Pino (Peru) C Huertas del Pino	7	7
(Argentina) Juan Estévez (Argentina) GI Justo
Alt	(Colombia) C Rodríguez (Colombia) A Urrea	w/o
WC	(Brazil) Gustavo Ribeiro de Almeida (Paraguay) Hernando José Escurra Isnardi	6	7
WC	(Paraguay) Lucas Brítez Risso (Paraguay) Santino Núñez	2	5
(Brazil) JVC Loureiro (Brazil) Natan Rodrigues	7	4	[10]
3	(Brazil) Bruno Oliveira (Brazil) PA Saraiva dos Santos	5	6	[5]
Alt	(Uruguay) J Aguilar Cardozo (Argentina) S de la Fuente	6	6
(Argentina) Mateo del Pino (Argentina) JM La Serna	4	3
(Colombia) JS Gómez (Mexico) A Hernández	4	5
2	(Argentina) Valentín Basel (Uruguay) I Carou	6	7

Quarterfinals
1	(Brazil) E Ribeiro (Bolivia) F Zeballos	3	7	[10]
(Argentina) H Casanova (Argentina) S Rodríguez Taverna	6	5	[4]
(Peru) A Huertas del Pino (Peru) C Huertas del Pino	6	7
Alt	(Colombia) C Rodríguez (Colombia) A Urrea	4	5
WC	(Brazil) GR de Almeida (Paraguay) HJ Escurra Isnardi	6^{3}	6^{2}
(Brazil) JVC Loureiro (Brazil) N Rodrigues	7^{7}	7^{7}
Alt	(Uruguay) J Aguilar Cardozo (Argentina) S de la Fuente	6	6
2	(Argentina) V Basel (Uruguay) I Carou	4	4

Semifinals
1	(Brazil) E Ribeiro (Bolivia) F Zeballos	6^{5}	4
(Peru) A Huertas del Pino (Peru) C Huertas del Pino	7^{7}	6
(Brazil) JVC Loureiro (Brazil) N Rodrigues	6	5	[4]
Alt	(Uruguay) J Aguilar Cardozo (Argentina) S de la Fuente	3	7	[10]

Final
(Peru) A Huertas del Pino (Peru) C Huertas del Pino	6^{4}	3
Alt	(Uruguay) J Aguilar Cardozo (Argentina) S de la Fuente	7^{7}	6
