= 2024 RD Open =

- Date: 12–17 August
- Edition: 8th
- Surface: Clay (green)
- Location: Santo Domingo, Dominican Republic

Champions

Singles
- (Bosnia and Herzegovina) Damir Džumhur

Doubles
- (Ecuador) Diego Hidalgo / (Mexico) Miguel Ángel Reyes-Varela
← 2023 ·	RD Open	· 2025 →

The 2024 RD Open was a professional tennis tournament played on green clay courts. It was the eighth edition of the tournament which was part of the 2024 ATP Challenger Tour. It took place in Santo Domingo, Dominican Republic between 12 and 17 August 2024.

== Singles main-draw entrants ==
=== Seeds ===
Country	Player	Rank^{1}	Seed
ARG	Federico Coria	73	1
ARG	Camilo Ugo Carabelli	91	2
BIH	Damir Džumhur	101	3
SRB	Laslo Djere	108	4
TPE	Tseng Chun-hsin	122	5
BRA	Felipe Meligeni Alves	143	6
BOL	Murkel Dellien	170	7
DOM	Nick Hardt	183	8

- ^{1} Rankings were as of 5 August 2024.

=== Other entrants ===
The following players received wildcards into the singles main draw:

- (Dominican Republic) Peter Bertran
- (Dominican Republic) Roberto Cid Subervi
- (Mexico) Rodrigo Pacheco Méndez

The following player received entry into the singles main draw as a special exempt:

- (Brazil) Mateus Alves

The following player received entry into the singles main draw as an alternate:

- (Bolivia) Juan Carlos Prado Ángelo

The following players received entry from the qualifying draw:

- (Canada) Liam Draxl
- (Argentina) Mariano Kestelboim
- (United States) Cannon Kingsley
- (United States) Christian Langmo
- (New Zealand) Kiranpal Pannu
- (United States) Ryan Seggerman

The following player received entry as a lucky loser:

- (Ecuador) Andrés Andrade

== Champions ==
=== Singles ===
- (Bosnia and Herzegovina) Damir Džumhur def. (Ecuador) Andrés Andrade 6–4, 6–4.

=== Doubles ===
- (Ecuador) Diego Hidalgo / (Mexico) Miguel Ángel Reyes-Varela def. (India) Sriram Balaji / (Brazil) Fernando Romboli 6–7^{(2–7)}, 6–4, [18–16].
