= 2019 Milex Open – Doubles =

Doubles
- 2019 Milex Open

Final
- Champions: (Uruguay) Ariel Behar (Ecuador) Gonzalo Escobar
- Runners-up: (Brazil) Orlando Luz (Venezuela) Luis David Martínez
- Score: 6–7^{(5–7)}, 6–4, [12–10]

Events
Singles	Doubles
- Milex Open

Leander Paes and Miguel Ángel Reyes-Varela were the defending champions but only Reyes-Varela chose to defend his title, partnering Marcelo Arévalo. Reyes-Varela lost in the semifinals to Orlando Luz and Luis David Martínez.

Ariel Behar and Gonzalo Escobar won the title after defeating Luz and Martínez 6–7^{(5–7)}, 6–4, [12–10] in the final.

== Seeds ==
1. (El Salvador) Marcelo Arévalo / (Mexico) Miguel Ángel Reyes-Varela (semifinals)
2. (Argentina) Guido Andreozzi / (Argentina) Andrés Molteni (first round)
3. (Uruguay) Ariel Behar / (Ecuador) Gonzalo Escobar (champions)
4. (Brazil) Orlando Luz / (Venezuela) Luis David Martínez (final)

== Draw ==
Key

- Q = Qualifier
- WC = Wild card
- LL = Lucky loser
- Alt = Alternate
- ITF = ITF entry
- PR = Protected ranking
- SR = Special ranking
- SE = Special exempt
- JE = Junior exempt
- JR = Junior Accelerator Programme entrant
- CO = College Accelerator Programme entrant
- NG = Next Gen Accelerator Program entrant
- w/o = Walkover
- r = Retired
- d = Defaulted

First round
1	(El Salvador) M Arévalo (Mexico) MÁ Reyes-Varela	6	7^{7}
(Ecuador) D Hidalgo (Brazil) F Romboli	3	6^{4}
(Peru) S Galdós (Bolivia) F Zeballos	6	6
(Italy) F Gaio (Italy) A Giannessi	4	0
4	(Brazil) O Luz (Venezuela) LD Martínez	6	7
WC	(Peru) N Álvarez (Dominican Republic) R Cid Subervi	2	5
(Argentina) A Collarini (Argentina) F Coria	4	2
(Argentina) P Cachin (Spain) P Martínez	6	6
Alt	(Brazil) T Monteiro (Brazil) P Sakamoto	6	7
(Brazil) J Menezes (Chile) A Tabilo	4	5
(Serbia) P Krstin (India) S Nagal	2	4
3	(Uruguay) A Behar (Ecuador) G Escobar	6	6
WC	(Dominican Republic) V Estrella Burgos (Dominican Republic) N Hardt	1	6^{5}
(Argentina) F Bagnis (Argentina) F Mena	6	7^{7}
WC	(Spain) C Gómez-Herrera (Dominican Republic) J Hernández-Fernández	2	7	[10]
2	(Argentina) G Andreozzi (Argentina) A Molteni	6	5	[8]

Quarterfinals
1	(El Salvador) M Arévalo (Mexico) MÁ Reyes-Varela	6	6
(Peru) S Galdós (Bolivia) F Zeballos	4	4
4	(Brazil) O Luz (Venezuela) LD Martínez	6	6
(Argentina) P Cachin (Spain) P Martínez	1	4
Alt	(Brazil) T Monteiro (Brazil) P Sakamoto	4	4
3	(Uruguay) A Behar (Ecuador) G Escobar	6	6
(Argentina) F Bagnis (Argentina) F Mena	6	6
WC	(Spain) C Gómez-Herrera (Dominican Republic) J Hernández-Fernández	3	3

Semifinals
1	(El Salvador) M Arévalo (Mexico) MÁ Reyes-Varela	7	3	[8]
4	(Brazil) O Luz (Venezuela) LD Martínez	5	6	[10]
3	(Uruguay) A Behar (Ecuador) G Escobar	6	3	[10]
(Argentina) F Bagnis (Argentina) F Mena	4	6	[7]

Final
4	(Brazil) O Luz (Venezuela) LD Martínez	7^{7}	4	[10]
3	(Uruguay) A Behar (Ecuador) G Escobar	6^{5}	6	[12]
