= 2024 RD Open – Doubles =

Doubles
- 2024 RD Open

Final
- Champions: (Ecuador) Diego Hidalgo (Mexico) Miguel Ángel Reyes-Varela
- Runners-up: (India) Sriram Balaji (Brazil) Fernando Romboli
- Score: 6–7^{(2–7)}, 6–4, [18–16]

Events
Singles	Doubles
← 2023 ·	RD Open	· 2025 →

Pedro Boscardin Dias and Gustavo Heide were the defending champions but only Boscardin Dias chose to defend his title, partnering Mateus Alves. They withdrew from the tournament before their first round match.

Diego Hidalgo and Miguel Ángel Reyes-Varela won the title after defeating Sriram Balaji and Fernando Romboli 6–7^{(2–7)}, 6–4, [18–16] in the final.

== Seeds ==
1. (Colombia) Nicolás Barrientos / (Kazakhstan) Aleksandr Nedovyesov (first round)
2. (Ecuador) Diego Hidalgo / (Mexico) Miguel Ángel Reyes-Varela (champions)
3. (India) Sriram Balaji / (Brazil) Fernando Romboli (final)
4. (United States) Ryan Seggerman / (United States) Patrik Trhac (first round)

== Draw ==
=== Key ===
- Q = Qualifier
- WC = Wild card
- LL = Lucky loser
- Alt = Alternate
- SE = Special exempt
- PR = Protected ranking
- ITF = ITF entry
- JE = Junior exempt
- w/o = Walkover
- r = Retired
- d = Defaulted
- SR = Special ranking

=== Draw ===
First round
1	(Colombia) N Barrientos (Kazakhstan) A Nedovyesov	4	7^{10}	[8]
(Bolivia) M Dellien (Argentina) R Olivo	6	6^{8}	[10]
Alt	(Ecuador) A Andrade (Canada) L Draxl	w/o
WC	(Dominican Republic) R Cid Subervi (United States) T-S Kwiatkowski
3	(India) S Balaji (Brazil) F Romboli	w/o
(Kazakhstan) D Popko (Argentina) C Ugo Carabelli
(Argentina) JP Ficovich (Argentina) M Kestelboim	6	4	[8]
(Brazil) M Demoliner (Brazil) M Zormann	4	6	[10]
Alt	(France) M Janvier (Australia) A Taylor	4	1
(United States) T Hilderbrand (United States) A Lawson	6	6
WC	(Dominican Republic) P Bertran (United States) Tennyson Whiting	6	6^{2}	[10]
4	(United States) R Seggerman (United States) P Trhac	3	7^{7}	[7]
(Uruguay) I Carou (Argentina) F Mena	6	5	[9]
(Bolivia) B Arias (Bolivia) F Zeballos	4	7	[11]
(Venezuela) LD Martínez (Colombia) C Rodríguez	3	4
2	(Ecuador) D Hidalgo (Mexico) MÁ Reyes-Varela	6	6

Quarterfinals
(Bolivia) M Dellien (Argentina) R Olivo
Alt	(Ecuador) A Andrade (Canada) L Draxl	w/o
3	(India) S Balaji (Brazil) F Romboli	3	6	[10]
(Brazil) M Demoliner (Brazil) M Zormann	6	1	[8]
(United States) T Hilderbrand (United States) A Lawson	7	6
WC	(Dominican Republic) P Bertran (United States) T Whiting	5	2
(Bolivia) B Arias (Bolivia) F Zeballos	3	6^{3}
2	(Ecuador) D Hidalgo (Mexico) MÁ Reyes-Varela	6	7^{7}

Semifinals
Alt	(Ecuador) A Andrade (Canada) L Draxl
3	(India) S Balaji (Brazil) F Romboli	w/o
(United States) T Hilderbrand (United States) A Lawson	7^{11}	5	[6]
2	(Ecuador) D Hidalgo (Mexico) MÁ Reyes-Varela	6^{9}	7	[10]

Final
3	(India) S Balaji (Brazil) F Romboli	7^{7}	4	[16]
2	(Ecuador) D Hidalgo (Mexico) MÁ Reyes-Varela	6^{2}	6	[18]
