= 2023 RD Open =

- Date: 7–13 August
- Edition: 7th
- Surface: Clay (green)
- Location: Santo Domingo, Dominican Republic

Champions

Singles
- (Argentina) Genaro Alberto Olivieri

Doubles
- (Brazil) Pedro Boscardin Dias / (Brazil) Gustavo Heide
← 2022 ·	RD Open	· 2024 →

The 2023 RD Open was a professional tennis tournament played on green clay courts. It was the seventh edition of the tournament which was part of the 2023 ATP Challenger Tour. It took place in Santo Domingo, Dominican Republic between 7 and 13 August 2023.

== Singles main-draw entrants ==
=== Seeds ===
Country	Player	Rank^{1}	Seed
ARG	Federico Coria	103	1
CHI	Alejandro Tabilo	122	2
ARG	Thiago Agustín Tirante	136	3
ITA	Flavio Cobolli	142	4
BOL	Hugo Dellien	165	5
BRA	Felipe Meligeni Alves	177	6
ARG	Genaro Alberto Olivieri	190	7
ARG	Marco Trungelliti	219	8

- ^{1} Rankings were as of 31 July 2023.

=== Other entrants ===
The following players received wildcards into the singles main draw:

- (Dominican Republic) Peter Bertran
- (Dominican Republic) Roberto Cid Subervi
- (Chile) Gonzalo Lama

The following player received entry into the singles main draw using a protected ranking:

- (Brazil) Pedro Sakamoto

The following players received entry from the qualifying draw:

- (Brazil) Mateus Alves
- (Argentina) Ignacio Monzón
- (Peru) Jorge Panta
- (The Bahamas) Justin Roberts
- (United States) Kyle Seelig
- (United States) Joshua Sheehy

== Champions ==
=== Singles ===
- (Argentina) Genaro Alberto Olivieri def. (Argentina) Marco Trungelliti 7–5, 2–6, 6–4.

=== Doubles ===
- (Brazil) Pedro Boscardin Dias / (Brazil) Gustavo Heide def. (Ecuador) Diego Hidalgo / (Colombia) Cristian Rodríguez 6–4, 7–5.
