= Santo Domingo Open =

Santo Domingo Open may refer to:

- Santo Domingo Open (badminton)
- Santo Domingo Open (tennis)
