= 2017 Milex Open – Doubles =

Doubles
- 2017 Milex Open

Final
- Champions: (Argentina) Juan Ignacio Londero (Venezuela) Luis David Martínez
- Runners-up: (Colombia) Daniel Elahi Galán (Colombia) Santiago Giraldo
- Score: 6–4, 6–4

Events
Singles	Doubles
- Milex Open

Ariel Behar and Giovanni Lapentti were the defending champions but chose not to defend their title.

Juan Ignacio Londero and Luis David Martínez won the title after defeating Daniel Elahi Galán and Santiago Giraldo 6–4, 6–4 in the final.

== Seeds ==
1. (Peru) Sergio Galdós / (Spain) David Marrero (quarterfinals)
2. (Australia) Jarryd Chaplin / (United States) Evan King (semifinals)
3. (Mexico) Miguel Ángel Reyes-Varela / (Brazil) Caio Zampieri (first round)
4. (Spain) Nicolás Almagro / (Brazil) Eduardo Russi Assumpção (semifinals)

== Draw ==
Key

- Q = Qualifier
- WC = Wild card
- LL = Lucky loser
- Alt = Alternate
- ITF = ITF entry
- PR = Protected ranking
- SR = Special ranking
- SE = Special exempt
- JE = Junior exempt
- JR = Junior Accelerator Programme entrant
- CO = College Accelerator Programme entrant
- NG = Next Gen Accelerator Program entrant
- w/o = Walkover
- r = Retired
- d = Defaulted

First round
1	(Peru) S Galdós (Spain) D Marrero	7^{7}	4	[10]
(Brazil) JP Sorgi (New Zealand) J Statham	6^{1}	6	[4]
(Colombia) DE Galán (Colombia) S Giraldo	2	6	[10]
WC	(Dominican Republic) R Cid Subervi (Dominican Republic) N Hardt	6	3	[1]
3	(Mexico) MÁ Reyes-Varela (Brazil) C Zampieri	6	6^{4}	[8]
(Chile) Jorge Montero (Argentina) M Trungelliti	4	7^{7}	[10]
(Portugal) G Elias (Portugal) F Gil	6	6
(France) C Hemery (France) G Mina	2	3
(Argentina) A Collarini (Chile) N Jarry	7^{7}	7^{7}
(Argentina) F Argüello (Brazil) G Clezar	6^{2}	6^{5}
WC	(Dominican Republic) V Estrella Burgos (Dominican Republic) J Olivares	5	3
4	(Spain) N Almagro (Brazil) E Russi Assumpção	7	6
(Bosnia and Herzegovina) D Džumhur (Colombia) C Rodríguez	7^{7}	2^{r}
(Argentina) JI Londero (Venezuela) LD Martínez	6^{2}	5
WC	(Ecuador) E Gómez (Dominican Republic) J Hernández-Fernández	2	7^{8}	[5]
2	(Australia) Jarryd Chaplin (United States) E King	6	6^{6}	[10]

Quarterfinals
1	(Peru) S Galdós (Spain) D Marrero	5	6^{7}
(Colombia) DE Galán (Colombia) S Giraldo	7	7^{9}
(Chile) J Montero (Argentina) M Trungelliti	6	6^{4}	[10]
(Portugal) G Elias (Portugal) F Gil	4	7^{7}	[6]
(Argentina) A Collarini (Chile) N Jarry
4	(Spain) N Almagro (Brazil) E Russi Assumpção	w/o
(Argentina) JI Londero (Venezuela) LD Martínez	6	6
2	(Australia) J Chaplin (United States) E King	3	4

Semifinals
(Colombia) DE Galán (Colombia) S Giraldo	6	3	[10]
(Chile) J Montero (Argentina) M Trungelliti	3	6	[5]
4	(Spain) N Almagro (Brazil) E Russi Assumpção	1	0
(Argentina) JI Londero (Venezuela) LD Martínez	6	6

Final
(Colombia) DE Galán (Colombia) S Giraldo	4	4
(Argentina) JI Londero (Venezuela) LD Martínez	6	6
