= 2015 Milex Open – Singles =

Singles
- 2015 Milex Open

Final
- Champion: (Bosnia and Herzegovina) Damir Džumhur
- Runner-up: (Argentina) Renzo Olivo
- Score: 7–5, 3–1, ret.

Events
Singles	Doubles
- Milex Open

This was the first edition of the tournament.
Damir Džumhur won the title, defeating Renzo Olivo in the final by retirement, 7–5, 3–1.

== Seeds ==
1. (Dominican Republic) Víctor Estrella Burgos (withdrew due to right leg injury)
2. (Spain) Albert Montañés (first round)
3. (Argentina) Horacio Zeballos (second round)
4. (Portugal) Gastão Elias (semifinals)
5. (Bosnia and Herzegovina) Damir Džumhur (champion)
6. (Russia) Evgeny Donskoy (first round)
7. (Australia) Jason Kubler (first round)
8. (Austria) Gerald Melzer (quarterfinals)

== Draw ==
Key

- Q = Qualifier
- WC = Wild card
- LL = Lucky loser
- Alt = Alternate
- ITF = ITF entry
- PR = Protected ranking
- SR = Special ranking
- SE = Special exempt
- JE = Junior exempt
- JR = Junior Accelerator Programme entrant
- CO = College Accelerator Programme entrant
- NG = Next Gen Accelerator Program entrant
- w/o = Walkover
- r = Retired
- d = Defaulted

=== Finals ===
Semifinals
5	(Bosnia and Herzegovina) Damir Džumhur	6	6
(Chile) Christian Garin	1	3
4	(Portugal) Gastão Elias	7^{8}	5	1
(Argentina) Renzo Olivo	6^{6}	7	6

Final
5	(Bosnia and Herzegovina) Damir Džumhur	7	3
(Argentina) Renzo Olivo	5	1^{r}

=== Top half ===
First round
LL	(Argentina) Patricio Heras	7^{7}	6
(Dominican Republic) J Hernández	6^{3}	4
(Chile) N Jarry	6	6
(Spain) Í Cervantes	2	4
(Argentina) JI Londero	3	7	6^{6}
Q	(Austria) B Trinker	6	5	7^{8}
Q	(Monaco) B Balleret	0	4
5	(Bosnia and Herzegovina) D Džumhur	6	6
3/WC	(Argentina) H Zeballos	4	6	6
(Italy) T Fabbiano	6	4	4
(Chile) C Garin	7^{7}	6
(France) G Mina	6^{4}	3
(Chile) G Lama	6	6
(Chile) H Podlipnik-Castillo	3	2
Q	(United States) Connor Smith	2	2
8	(Austria) G Melzer	6	6

Second round
LL	(Argentina) P Heras	4	6^{3}
(Chile) N Jarry	6	7^{7}
Q	(Austria) B Trinker	1	3
5	(Bosnia and Herzegovina) D Džumhur	6	6
3/WC	(Argentina) H Zeballos	6	6^{3}	6^{5}
(Chile) C Garin	1	7^{7}	7^{7}
(Chile) G Lama	1	3
8	(Austria) G Melzer	6	6

Quarterfinals
(Chile) N Jarry	4	4
5	(Bosnia and Herzegovina) D Džumhur	6	6
(Chile) C Garin	6	2
8	(Austria) G Melzer	2	0^{r}

Semifinals
5	(Bosnia and Herzegovina) D Džumhur	6	6
(Chile) C Garin	1	3

=== Bottom half ===
First round
7	(Australia) J Kubler	5	2
WC	(Ecuador) E Gómez	7	6
(Bolivia) H Dellien	6	6
(Spain) J Samper-Montaña	2	1
(Netherlands) A van der Duim	6	2	7
(Spain) R Ramírez Hidalgo	4	6	5
WC	(Argentina) A Molteni	4	2
4	(Portugal) G Elias	6	6
6	(Russia) E Donskoy	2	6	1
(Spain) R Carballés Baena	6	4	6
(Belgium) Y Mertens	7	3	6
Q	(Ecuador) G Escobar	5	6	3
WC	(Dominican Republic) J Olivares	6	1	0
(Spain) D Muñoz de la Nava	2	6	6
(Argentina) R Olivo	1	7	6
2	(Spain) A Montañés	6	5	3

Second round
WC	(Ecuador) E Gómez	3	3
(Bolivia) H Dellien	6	6
(Netherlands) A van der Duim	2	6^{2}
4	(Portugal) G Elias	6	7^{7}
(Spain) R Carballés Baena	6	6
(Belgium) Y Mertens	3	1
(Spain) D Muñoz de la Nava	6	5	6^{4}
(Argentina) R Olivo	3	7	7^{7}

Quarterfinals
(Bolivia) H Dellien	6	6^{6}	2
4	(Portugal) G Elias	3	7^{8}	6
(Spain) R Carballés Baena	6	6^{3}	5
(Argentina) R Olivo	4	7^{7}	7

Semifinals
4	(Portugal) G Elias	7^{8}	5	1
(Argentina) R Olivo	6^{6}	7	6
