= 2015 Milex Open =

- Date: 7 February – 15 February
- Edition: 1st
- Draw: 32S / 16D
- Prize money: $50,000+H
- Surface: Green clay
- Location: Santo Domingo, Dominican Republic

Champions

Singles
- (Bosnia and Herzegovina) Damir Džumhur

Doubles
- (Venezuela) Roberto Maytín / (Chile) Hans Podlipnik Castillo
- Milex Open

The 2015 Milex Open was a professional tennis tournament played on green clay courts. It was the first edition of the tournament which was part of the 2015 ATP Challenger Tour. It took place in Santo Domingo, Dominican Republic between 7 February and 15 February 2015. The event was the first professional tennis tournament of the Challenger level to be held in the Dominican Republic.

== Singles main draw entrants ==
=== Seeds ===
Country	Player	Rank^{1}	Seed
DOM	Víctor Estrella Burgos	52	1
ESP	Albert Montañés	102	2
ARG	Horacio Zeballos	124	3
POR	Gastão Elias	126	4
BIH	Damir Džumhur	128	5
RUS	Evgeny Donskoy	129	6
AUS	Jason Kubler	138	7
AUT	Gerald Melzer	154	8

- ^{1} Rankings are as of February 2, 2015.

=== Other entrants ===
The following players received wildcards into the singles main draw:

- (Ecuador) Emilio Gómez
- (Argentina) Andrés Molteni
- (Dominican Republic) José Olivares
- (Argentina) Horacio Zeballos

The following players received entry from the qualifying draw:

- (Monaco) Benjamin Balleret
- (Ecuador) Gonzalo Escobar
- (United States) Connor Smith
- (Austria) Bastian Trinker

The following player received entry as a Lucky loser:

- (Argentina) Patricio Heras

=== Withdrawals ===
During the tournament

- (Dominican Republic) Víctor Estrella Burgos → replaced by Patricio Heras

== Champions ==
=== Singles ===
- (Bosnia and Herzegovina) Damir Džumhur def. (Argentina) Renzo Olivo, 7–5, 3–1, ret.

=== Doubles ===
- (Venezuela) Roberto Maytín / (Chile) Hans Podlipnik Castillo def. (Monaco) Romain Arneodo / (Monaco) Benjamin Balleret, 6–3, 2–6, [10–4]
