= 2026 CIT Open =

- Date: 15 – 20 June
- Edition: 1st
- Surface: Clay
- Location: Asunción, Paraguay

Champions

Singles
- (Dominican Republic) Nick Hardt

Doubles
- (Uruguay) Joaquín Aguilar Cardozo / (Argentina) Santiago de la Fuente
- CIT Open

The 2026 CIT Open was a professional tennis tournament played on clay courts. It was the first edition of the tournament which was part of the 2026 ATP Challenger Tour. It took place in Asunción, Paraguay from 15 to 20 June 2026.

== Singles main-draw entrants ==
=== Seeds ===
Country	Player	Rank^{1}	Seed
ARG	Guido Iván Justo	254	1
ARG	Juan Bautista Torres	282	2
ARG	Juan Manuel La Serna	290	3
BRA	Thiago Seyboth Wild	299	4
CHI	Matías Soto	316	5
ARG	Nicolás Kicker	361	6
ARG	Santiago Rodríguez Taverna	383	7
ARG	Juan Estévez	385	8

- ^{1} Rankings are as of 8 June 2026.

=== Other entrants ===
The following players received wildcards into the singles main draw:

- (Argentina) Federico Coria
- (Paraguay) Hernando José Escurra Isnardi
- (Paraguay) Santino Núñez

The following player received entry into the singles main draw as a special exempt:

- (Colombia) Johan Alexander Rodríguez

The following players received entry into the singles main draw as alternates:

- (Argentina) Santiago de la Fuente
- (Colombia) Samuel Alejandro Linde Palacios

The following players received entry from the qualifying draw:

- (Brazil) Gustavo Ribeiro de Almeida
- (Colombia) Samuel Heredia
- (Peru) Conner Huertas del Pino
- (Argentina) Ignacio Monzón
- (Venezuela) Ignacio Parisca
- (Argentina) Máximo Zeitune

== Champions ==
=== Singles ===
- (Dominican Republic) Nick Hardt def. (Argentina) Juan Estévez 7–6^{(7–0)}, 4–6, 6–2.

=== Doubles ===
- (Uruguay) Joaquín Aguilar Cardozo / (Argentina) Santiago de la Fuente def. (Peru) Arklon Huertas del Pino / (Peru) Conner Huertas del Pino 7–6^{(7–4)}, 6–3.
