= 2016 Milex Open – Singles =

Singles
- 2016 Milex Open

Final
- Champion: (Argentina) Guido Andreozzi
- Runner-up: (Argentina) Nicolás Kicker
- Score: 6–0 , 6–4

Events
| Singles | Doubles |
- Milex Open

Damir Džumhur was the defending champion, but chose to participate in the 2016 Memphis Open instead.

Guido Andreozzi won the title, defeating Nicolás Kicker 6–0, 6–4 in the final.

== Seeds ==
1. (Dominican Republic) Víctor Estrella Burgos (second round)
2. (Argentina) Horacio Zeballos (first round)
3. (Austria) Gerald Melzer (second round)
4. (Spain) Roberto Carballés Baena (quarterfinals)
5. (Slovakia) Andrej Martin (quarterfinals)
6. (Colombia) Alejandro González (first round)
7. (Brazil) André Ghem (first round)
8. (Brazil) João Souza (second round)

== Draw ==
Key

- Q = Qualifier
- WC = Wild card
- LL = Lucky loser
- Alt = Alternate
- ITF = ITF entry
- PR = Protected ranking
- SR = Special ranking
- SE = Special exempt
- JE = Junior exempt
- JR = Junior Accelerator Programme entrant
- CO = College Accelerator Programme entrant
- NG = Next Gen Accelerator Program entrant
- w/o = Walkover
- r = Retired
- d = Defaulted

=== Finals ===
Semifinals
(Slovakia) Jozef Kovalík | 5 | 4
(Argentina) Guido Andreozzi | 7 | 6
(France) Mathias Bourgue | 4 | 5
(Argentina) Nicolás Kicker | 6 | 7

Final
(Argentina) Guido Andreozzi | 6 | 6
(Argentina) Nicolás Kicker | 0 | 4

=== Top half ===
First round
1 | (Dominican Republic) V Estrella Burgos | 6 | 6
Q | (Chile) G Lama | 3 | 4
(Slovakia) J Kovalík | 7 | 7^{7}
Q | (Spain) P Riba | 5 | 6^{5}
(France) C Hemery | 6 | 6
(France) J Eysseric | 4 | 2
(Spain) O Roca Batalla | 4 | 4
5 | (Slovakia) A Martin | 6 | 6
3 | (Austria) G Melzer | 7^{7} | 6
WC | (Chile) N Jarry | 6^{3} | 3
(Argentina) G Andreozzi | 6 | 6
(Spain) J Samper-Montaña | 0 | 3
Q | (Ecuador) R Quiroz | 6 | 4 | 6
WC | (Ecuador) E Gómez | 1 | 6 | 3
(France) M Chazal | 6^{4} | 6 | 6
7 | (Brazil) A Ghem | 7^{7} | 4 | 4

Second round
1 | (Dominican Republic) V Estrella Burgos | 3 | 2
(Slovakia) J Kovalík | 6 | 6
(France) C Hemery | 4 | 6^{5}
5 | (Slovakia) A Martin | 6 | 7^{7}
3 | (Austria) G Melzer | 3 | 6 | 2
(Argentina) G Andreozzi | 6 | 4 | 6
Q | (Ecuador) R Quiroz | 3 | 5
(France) M Chazal | 6 | 7

Quarterfinals
(Slovakia) J Kovalík | 7^{8} | 6
5 | (Slovakia) A Martin | 6^{6} | 3
(Argentina) G Andreozzi | 6 | 6
(France) M Chazal | 1 | 1

Semifinals
(Slovakia) J Kovalík | 5 | 4
(Argentina) G Andreozzi | 7 | 6

=== Bottom half ===
First round
8/Alt | (Brazil) J Souza | 6 | 5 | 6
(Ecuador) G Lapentti | 4 | 7 | 4
(France) M Bourgue | 6 | 7
WC | (Dominican Republic) J Olivares | 3 | 5
(Italy) G Naso | 6 | 6
(Austria) B Trinker | 1 | 1
WC | (Dominican Republic) N Hardt | 1 | 0
4 | (Spain) R Carballés Baena | 6 | 6
6 | (Colombia) A González | 6^{3} | 6 | 3
(Dominican Republic) J Hernández-Fernández | 7^{7} | 4 | 6
(Argentina) N Kicker | 6 | 6
Q | (Barbados) D King | 2 | 1
Alt | (Croatia) F Škugor | 6 | 0 | 6
(Spain) R Ramírez Hidalgo | 4 | 6 | 3
(Italy) A Giannessi | 6 | 6
2 | (Argentina) H Zeballos | 1 | 3

Second round
8/Alt | (Brazil) J Souza | 1 | 6^{4}
(France) M Bourgue | 6 | 7^{7}
(Italy) G Naso | 6 | 3 | 6^{2}
4 | (Spain) R Carballés Baena | 4 | 6 | 7^{7}
(Dominican Republic) J Hernández-Fernández | 3 | 1
(Argentina) N Kicker | 6 | 6
Alt | (Croatia) F Škugor | 6^{0} | 6^{2}
(Italy) A Giannessi | 7^{7} | 7^{7}

Quarterfinals
(France) M Bourgue | 1 | 6 | 6
4 | (Spain) R Carballés Baena | 6 | 4 | 4
(Argentina) N Kicker | 6 | 3 | 6
(Italy) A Giannessi | 4 | 6 | 2

Semifinals
(France) M Bourgue | 4 | 5
(Argentina) N Kicker | 6 | 7
