= 2023 RD Open – Doubles =

Doubles
- 2023 RD Open

Final
- Champions: (Brazil) Pedro Boscardin Dias (Brazil) Gustavo Heide
- Runners-up: (Ecuador) Diego Hidalgo (Colombia) Cristian Rodríguez
- Score: 6–4, 7–5

Events
Singles	Doubles
- RD Open

Ruben Gonzales and Reese Stalder were the defending champions but chose not to defend their title.

Pedro Boscardin Dias and Gustavo Heide won the title after defeating Diego Hidalgo and Cristian Rodríguez 6–4, 7–5 in the final.

== Seeds ==
1. (Colombia) Nicolás Barrientos / (Sweden) André Göransson (first round)
2. (Venezuela) Luis David Martínez / (Australia) John-Patrick Smith (first round)
3. (Mexico) Hans Hach Verdugo / (Mexico) Miguel Ángel Reyes-Varela (first round)
4. (Ecuador) Diego Hidalgo / (Colombia) Cristian Rodríguez (final)

== Draw ==
Key

- Q = Qualifier
- WC = Wild card
- LL = Lucky loser
- Alt = Alternate
- ITF = ITF entry
- PR = Protected ranking
- SR = Special ranking
- SE = Special exempt
- JE = Junior exempt
- JR = Junior Accelerator Programme entrant
- CO = College Accelerator Programme entrant
- NG = Next Gen Accelerator Program entrant
- w/o = Walkover
- r = Retired
- d = Defaulted

First round
1	(Colombia) N Barrientos (Sweden) A Göransson	4	6	[7]
(Australia) A Harris (United States) C Harrison	6	4	[10]
(Peru) G Bueno (Argentina) JP Ficovich	5	4
(Brazil) P Boscardin Dias (Brazil) G Heide	7	6
3	(Mexico) H Hach Verdugo (Mexico) MÁ Reyes-Varela	6	1	[8]
WC	(Dominican Republic) R Cid Subervi (Dominican Republic) N Hardt	2	6	[10]
WC	(Dominican Republic) Jasel Alfredo Beltre Rosario (Dominican Republic) Alejandro José Gandini	4	3
(Uruguay) I Carou (Argentina) Ignacio Monzón	6	6
(Peru) C Huertas del Pino (Peru) J Panta	7^{7}	4	[10]
(Brazil) M Pucinelli de Almeida (Brazil) JL Reis da Silva	6^{5}	6	[8]
(Brazil) M Alves (Brazil) E Ribeiro	6	3	[4]
4	(Ecuador) D Hidalgo (Colombia) C Rodríguez	4	6	[10]
Alt	(Colombia) JS Gómez (Colombia) A Urrea	2	5
PR	(Brazil) P Sakamoto (Japan) K Uchida	6	7
(Dominican Republic) P Bertran (Portugal) G Oliveira	6	4	[10]
2	(Venezuela) LD Martínez (Australia) J-P Smith	4	6	[8]

Quarterfinals
(Australia) A Harris (United States) C Harrison	2	6	[8]
(Brazil) P Boscardin Dias (Brazil) G Heide	6	4	[10]
WC	(Dominican Republic) R Cid Subervi (Dominican Republic) N Hardt	6	6
(Uruguay) I Carou (Argentina) I Monzón	1	4
(Peru) C Huertas del Pino (Peru) J Panta	6	2	[5]
4	(Ecuador) D Hidalgo (Colombia) C Rodríguez	4	6	[10]
PR	(Brazil) P Sakamoto (Japan) K Uchida	6	4	[10]
(Dominican Republic) P Bertran (Portugal) G Oliveira	4	6	[4]

Semifinals
(Brazil) P Boscardin Dias (Brazil) G Heide	6	6
WC	(Dominican Republic) R Cid Subervi (Dominican Republic) N Hardt	2	4
4	(Ecuador) D Hidalgo (Colombia) C Rodríguez	6	6
PR	(Brazil) P Sakamoto (Japan) K Uchida	2	2

Final
(Brazil) P Boscardin Dias (Brazil) G Heide	6	7
4	(Ecuador) D Hidalgo (Colombia) C Rodríguez	4	5
