= 2023 RD Open – Singles =

Singles
- 2023 RD Open

Final
- Champion: (Argentina) Genaro Alberto Olivieri
- Runner-up: (Argentina) Marco Trungelliti
- Score: 7–5, 2–6, 6–4

Events
Singles	Doubles
- RD Open

Pedro Cachin was the defending champion but chose not to defend his title.

Genaro Alberto Olivieri won the title after defeating Marco Trungelliti 7–5, 2–6, 6–4 in the final.

== Seeds ==
1. (Argentina) Federico Coria (semifinals)
2. (Chile) Alejandro Tabilo (quarterfinals)
3. (Argentina) Thiago Agustín Tirante (second round)
4. (Italy) Flavio Cobolli (first round)
5. (Bolivia) Hugo Dellien (first round)
6. (Brazil) Felipe Meligeni Alves (quarterfinals, retired)
7. (Argentina) Genaro Alberto Olivieri (champion)
8. (Argentina) Marco Trungelliti (final)

== Draw ==
Key

- Q = Qualifier
- WC = Wild card
- LL = Lucky loser
- Alt = Alternate
- ITF = ITF entry
- PR = Protected ranking
- SR = Special ranking
- SE = Special exempt
- JE = Junior exempt
- JR = Junior Accelerator Programme entrant
- CO = College Accelerator Programme entrant
- NG = Next Gen Accelerator Program entrant
- w/o = Walkover
- r = Retired
- d = Defaulted

=== Finals ===
Semifinals
1	(Argentina) Federico Coria	4	6	5
7	(Argentina) Genaro Alberto Olivieri	6	3	7
(Argentina) Francisco Comesaña	5	3
8	(Argentina) Marco Trungelliti	7	6

Final
7	(Argentina) Genaro Alberto Olivieri	7	2	6
8	(Argentina) Marco Trungelliti	5	6	4

=== Top half ===
First round
1	(Argentina) F Coria	6	6
Q	(Peru) J Panta	0	3
(Argentina) JP Ficovich	6	0	6
PR	(Brazil) P Sakamoto	4	6	2
(Brazil) JL Reis da Silva	6	6
Q	(The Bahamas) J Roberts	4	4
(Australia) B Tomic	6	6
5	(Bolivia) H Dellien	3	2
4	(Italy) F Cobolli	4	1
(Bolivia) M Dellien	6	6
Q	(Brazil) M Alves	7	6
WC	(Dominican Republic) R Cid Subervi	5	3
Q	(Argentina) Ignacio Monzón	6	6^{3}	6
(Japan) K Uchida	4	7^{7}	4
(Brazil) M Pucinelli de Almeida	2	6	2
7	(Argentina) GA Olivieri	6	1	6

Second round
1	(Argentina) F Coria	6	1	6
(Argentina) JP Ficovich	4	6	4
(Brazil) JL Reis da Silva	7	4	4
(Australia) B Tomic	5	6	6
(Bolivia) M Dellien	4	6	6
Q	(Brazil) M Alves	6	3	4
Q	(Argentina) I Monzón	4	0
7	(Argentina) GA Olivieri	6	6

Quarterfinals
1	(Argentina) F Coria	6^{2}	6	6
(Australia) B Tomic	7^{7}	2	3
(Bolivia) M Dellien	3	3
7	(Argentina) GA Olivieri	6	6

Semifinals
1	(Argentina) F Coria	4	6	5
7	(Argentina) GA Olivieri	6	3	7

=== Bottom half ===
First round
6	(Brazil) F Meligeni Alves	6	7^{10}
(Brazil) E Ribeiro	4	6^{8}
WC	(Dominican Republic) P Bertran	6	5	6
(Dominican Republic) N Hardt	3	7	2
(Portugal) G Oliveira	4	0
(Argentina) F Comesaña	6	6
(Brazil) G Heide	6^{4}	4
3	(Argentina) TA Tirante	7^{7}	6
8	(Argentina) M Trungelliti	6	6
(Brazil) P Boscardin Dias	4	1
Q	(United States) J Sheehy	6^{6}	3
(Peru) G Bueno	7^{8}	6
(Spain) F Verdasco	1	6	3
WC	(Chile) G Lama	6	3	6
Q	(United States) Kyle Seelig	5	3
2	(Chile) A Tabilo	7	6

Second round
6	(Brazil) F Meligeni Alves	6	6
WC	(Dominican Republic) P Bertran	1	3
(Argentina) F Comesaña	6	6^{5}	7
3	(Argentina) TA Tirante	1	7^{7}	5
8	(Argentina) M Trungelliti	6	6
(Peru) G Bueno	3	4
WC	(Chile) G Lama	3	0
2	(Chile) A Tabilo	6	6

Quarterfinals
6	(Brazil) F Meligeni Alves	4	0^{r}
(Argentina) F Comesaña	6	0
8	(Argentina) M Trungelliti	6	6
2	(Chile) A Tabilo	4	2

Semifinals
(Argentina) F Comesaña	5	3
8	(Argentina) M Trungelliti	7	6
