= 2015 Milex Open – Doubles =

Doubles
- 2015 Milex Open

Final
- Champions: (Venezuela) Roberto Maytín (Chile) Hans Podlipnik-Castillo
- Runners-up: (Monaco) Romain Arneodo (Monaco) Benjamin Balleret
- Score: 6–3, 2–6, [10–4]

Events
| Singles | Doubles |
- Milex Open

This was the first edition of the tournament.
Roberto Maytín and Hans Podlipnik-Castillo won the title, defeating Romain Arneodo and Benjamin Balleret in the final, 6–3, 2–6, [10–4].

== Seeds ==
1. (Argentina) Guillermo Durán / (Argentina) Andrés Molteni (semifinals)
2. (Mexico) César Ramírez / (Mexico) Miguel Ángel Reyes-Varela (semifinals)
3. (United States) James Cerretani / (Peru) Sergio Galdós (first round)
4. (Monaco) Romain Arneodo / (Monaco) Benjamin Balleret (final)

== Draw ==
Key

- Q = Qualifier
- WC = Wild card
- LL = Lucky loser
- Alt = Alternate
- ITF = ITF entry
- PR = Protected ranking
- SR = Special ranking
- SE = Special exempt
- JE = Junior exempt
- JR = Junior Accelerator Programme entrant
- CO = College Accelerator Programme entrant
- NG = Next Gen Accelerator Program entrant
- w/o = Walkover
- r = Retired
- d = Defaulted

=== Draw ===
First round
1 | (Argentina) G Durán (Argentina) A Molteni | 6 | 3 | [10]
(Bosnia and Herzegovina) D Džumhur (Netherlands) A van der Duim | 2 | 6 | [7]
WC | (Dominican Republic) J Olivares (Venezuela) D Souto | 3 | 2
(Chile) N Jarry (Chile) G Lama | 6 | 6
4 | (Monaco) R Arneodo (Monaco) B Balleret | 6 | 6
(Austria) G Melzer (Belgium) Y Mertens | 4 | 2
(Spain) D Muñoz de la Nava (Spain) R Ramírez Hidalgo | 7^{7} | 7
(Bolivia) H Dellien (Argentina) JI Londero | 6^{5} | 5
(Venezuela) R Maytín (Chile) H Podlipnik-Castillo | 6 | 7
WC | (Ecuador) G Escobar (Australia) J Kubler | 2 | 5
WC | (South Africa) D O'Brien (Colombia) JC Spir | 4 | 6 | [13]
3 | (United States) J Cerretani (Peru) S Galdós | 6 | 3 | [11]
(Spain) I Cervantes Huegun (Spain) J Samper-Montaña | 6 | 3 | [5]
(Dominican Republic) J Hernández (Argentina) H Zeballos | 4 | 6 | [10]
(Spain) R Carballés Baena (Italy) T Fabbiano | 5 | 4
2 | (Mexico) C Ramírez (Mexico) MÁ Reyes-Varela | 7 | 6

Quarterfinals
1 | (Argentina) G Durán (Argentina) A Molteni | 7^{7} | 6
(Chile) N Jarry (Chile) G Lama | 6^{4} | 4
4 | (Monaco) R Arneodo (Monaco) B Balleret | 0 | 6 | [10]
(Spain) D Muñoz de la Nava (Spain) R Ramírez Hidalgo | 6 | 2 | [5]
(Venezuela) R Maytín (Chile) H Podlipnik-Castillo | 7^{11} | 4 | [10]
WC | (South Africa) D O'Brien (Colombia) JC Spir | 6^{9} | 6 | [8]
(Dominican Republic) J Hernández (Argentina) H Zeballos | 6^{3} | 2
2 | (Mexico) C Ramírez (Mexico) MÁ Reyes-Varela | 7^{7} | 6

Semifinals
1 | (Argentina) G Durán (Argentina) A Molteni | 7 | 3 | [8]
4 | (Monaco) R Arneodo (Monaco) B Balleret | 5 | 6 | [10]
(Venezuela) R Maytín (Chile) H Podlipnik-Castillo | 1 | 7 | [10]
2 | (Mexico) C Ramírez (Mexico) MÁ Reyes-Varela | 6 | 5 | [7]

Final
4 | (Monaco) R Arneodo (Monaco) B Balleret | 3 | 6 | 4
(Venezuela) R Maytín (Chile) H Podlipnik-Castillo | 6 | 2 | [10]
