= CIT Open =

- 2026 CIT Open

ATP Challenger Tour
- Location: Asunción, Paraguay
- Category: ATP Challenger Tour
- Surface: Clay

The CIT Open is a professional tennis tournament played on clay courts. It is currently part of the ATP Challenger Tour. It was first held in Asunción, Paraguay in 2026.

== Past finals ==
=== Singles ===
Year	Champion	Runner-up	Score
2026	(Dominican Republic) Nick Hardt	(Argentina) Juan Estévez	7–6^{(7–0)}, 4–6, 6–2

=== Doubles ===
Year	Champions	Runners-up	Score
2026	(Uruguay) Joaquín Aguilar Cardozo (Argentina) Santiago de la Fuente	(Peru) Arklon Huertas del Pino (Peru) Conner Huertas del Pino	7–6^{(7–4)}, 6–3
