= Joaquín Aguilar Cardozo =

Uruguayan tennis player (born 2005)

- Country (sports): Uruguay
- Born: 8 April 2005 (age 21) Paysandú, Uruguay
- Height: 1.68 m (5 ft 6 in)
- Plays: Right-handed (two-handed backhand)
- Prize money: US $70,926

Singles
- Career record: 2–4 (at ATP Tour level, Grand Slam level, and in Davis Cup)
- Career titles: 1 ITF
- Highest ranking: No. 288 (2 November 2026)
- Current ranking: No. 288 (2 November 2026)

Doubles
- Career record: 0–0 (at ATP Tour level, Grand Slam level, and in Davis Cup)
- Career titles: 1 Challenger, 8 ITF
- Highest ranking: No. 360 (19 October 2026)
- Current ranking: No. 378 (2 November 2026)
- Last updated on: 2 November 2026.

Joaquín Aguilar Cardozo is an Uruguayan tennis player, born on 8 April 2005 in Paysandú, Uruguay. Cardozo has a career high ATP singles ranking of No. 288 achieved on 2 November 2026 and a career high ATP doubles ranking of No. 360 achieved on 19 October 2026.

Aguilar Cardozo has won one ATP Challenger doubles title at the 2026 CIT Open.

Aguilar Cardozo represents Uruguay at the Davis Cup, where he has a win/loss record of 2–4.
