= Santiago de la Fuente =

Argentine tennis player (born 2002)

- Country (sports): Argentina
- Born: 6 February 2002 (age 24) Dolores, Argentina
- Height: 1.75 m (5 ft 9 in)
- Plays: Right-handed (two-handed backhand)
- Prize money: US $63,228

Singles
- Career record: 0–0 (at ATP Tour level, Grand Slam level, and in Davis Cup)
- Career titles: 2 ITF
- Highest ranking: No. 618 (10 November 2025)
- Current ranking: No. 712 (19 October 2026)

Doubles
- Career record: 0–0 (at ATP Tour level, Grand Slam level, and in Davis Cup)
- Career titles: 1 Challenger, 7 ITF
- Highest ranking: No. 304 (19 October 2026)
- Current ranking: No. 304 (19 October 2026)
- Last updated on: 19 October 2026.

Santiago de la Fuente (born 6 February 2002) is an Argentine tennis player. He has a career high ATP singles ranking of No. 618 achieved on 10 November 2025 and a career high ATP doubles ranking of No. 304 achieved on 19 October 2026.

De la Fuente has won one ATP Challenger doubles title at the 2026 CIT Open.
