= Pedro Cachin =

Argentine tennis player

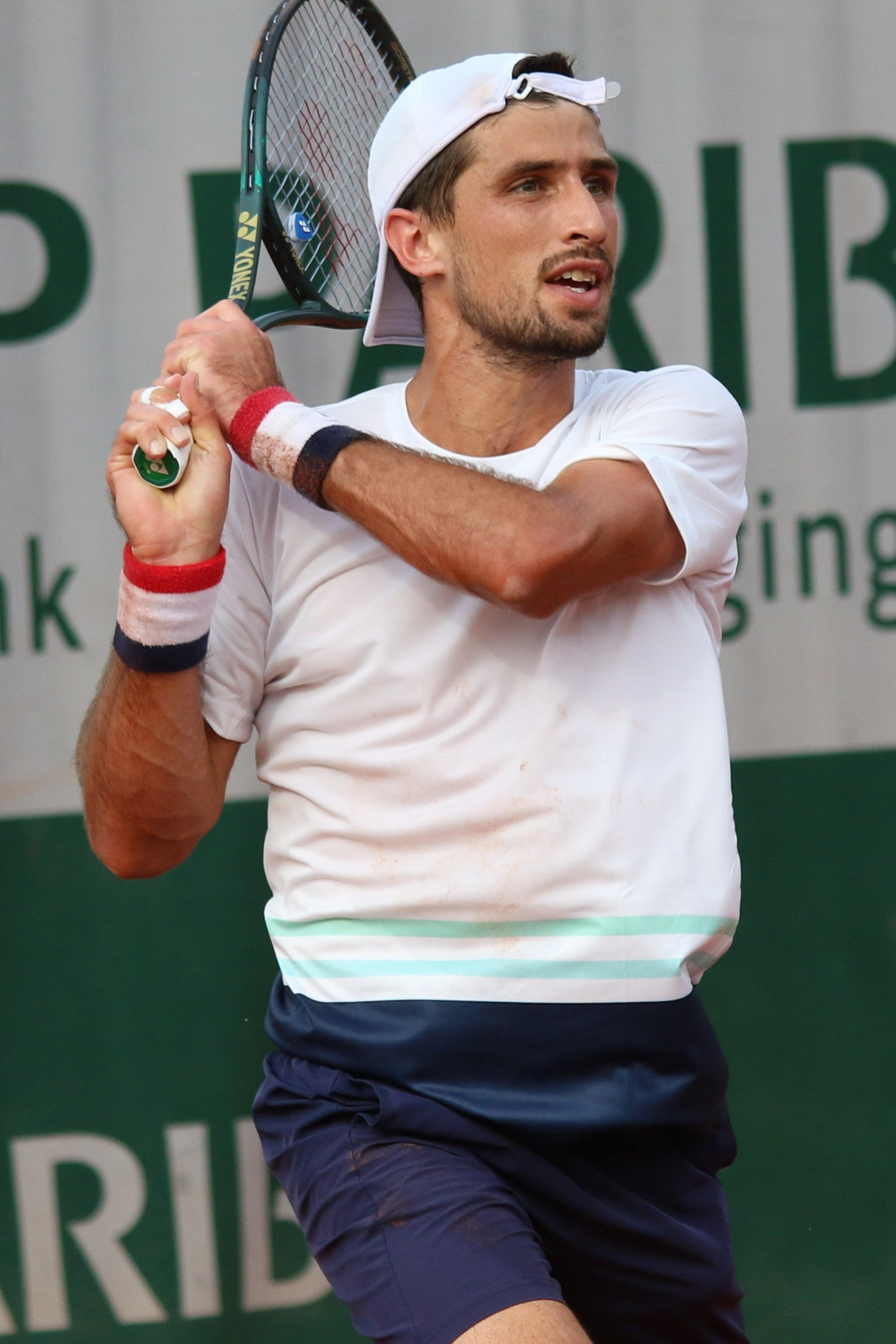
- Cachin at the 2022 French Open
- Country (sports): Argentina
- Residence: Córdoba, Argentina
- Born: 12 April 1995 (age 31) Bell Ville, Argentina
- Height: 1.85 m (6 ft 1 in)
- Turned pro: 2013
- Retired: 3 November 2025
- Plays: Right-handed (two handed-backhand)
- Coach: Dante Gennaro, Àlex Corretja
- Prize money: US $2,121,419

Singles
- Career record: 25–47
- Career titles: 1
- Highest ranking: No. 48 (7 August 2023)

Grand Slam singles results
- Australian Open: 1R (2023, 2024)
- French Open: 2R (2022, 2023)
- Wimbledon: 1R (2023)
- US Open: 3R (2022)

Doubles
- Career record: 5–23
- Career titles: 0
- Highest ranking: No. 219 (9 May 2022)

Grand Slam doubles results
- Australian Open: 1R (2023, 2024)
- French Open: 2R (2023)
- Wimbledon: 1R (2023)
- US Open: 1R (2023)

Pedro Cachin (pronounced [ˈpeðɾo kaˈtʃin]; born 12 April 1995), also known as Pedro Cachín, is an Argentine former professional tennis player. Cachin had a career-high ATP singles ranking of world No. 48, achieved on 7 August 2023 and a doubles ranking of No. 219, achieved on 9 May 2022. He won one ATP Tour singles title, at the 2023 Swiss Open Gstaad.

As a junior, he reached a career-high ranking of No. 8 on 9 December 2013.

== Professional career ==
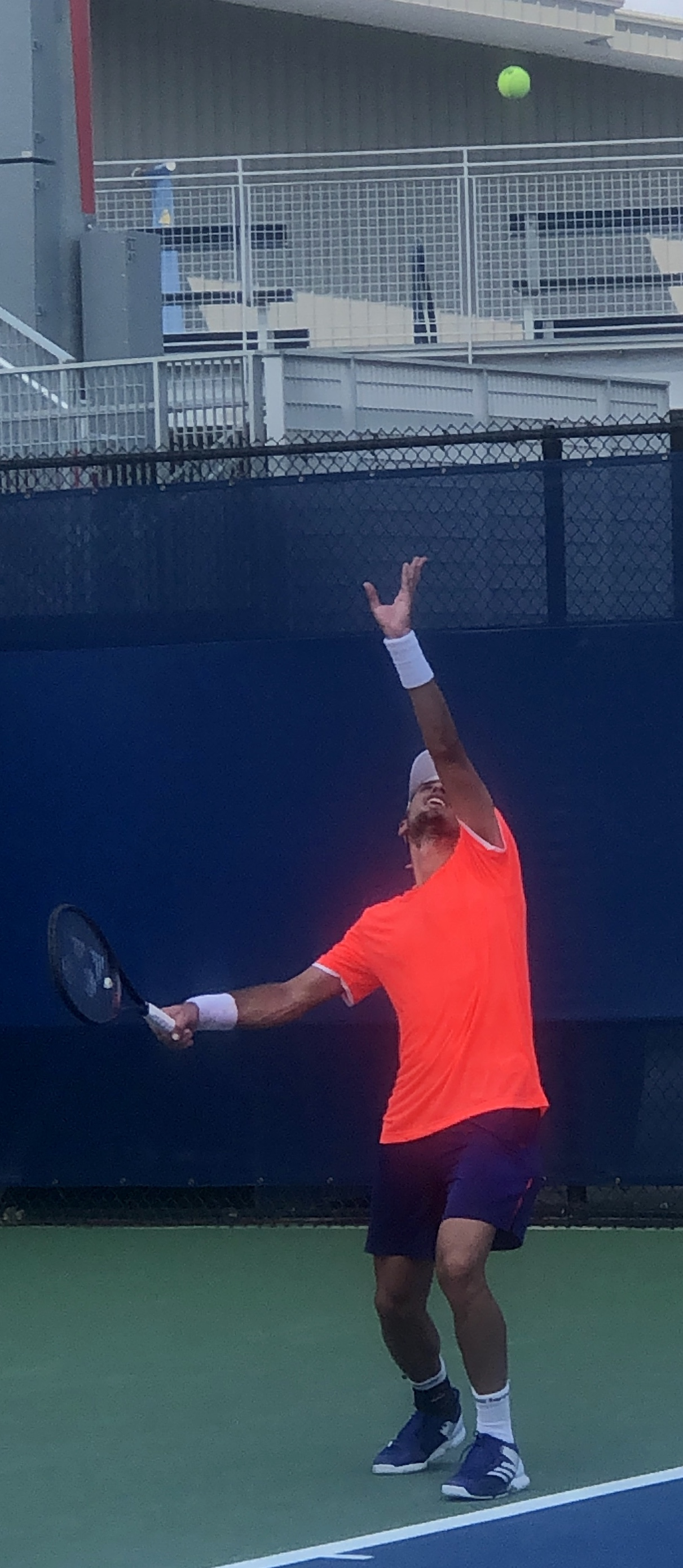
Cachin serving at the 2019 US Open

=== 2015–2019: ATP debut in doubles, first Challenger title ===
Cachin made his ATP main-draw debut as a wildcard in the doubles competition of the 2015 Argentina Open, partnering Facundo Argüello. They saved a match point and defeated the second-seeded pair of Máximo González and Horacio Zeballos before losing to Carlos Berlocq and Diego Schwartzman in the second round.

Cachin entered his first Grand Slam tournament at the 2015 Wimbledon Championships, but was eliminated by Jimmy Wang 4–6, 6–3, 7–5 in the first round of the qualifying competition.

In September 2015, ranked No. 248, Cachin won his maiden Challenger title at the Copa Sevilla, defeating top seed and world No. 54 Pablo Carreño Busta in the final.

By 2019, Cachin had increased his ranking enough to receive entry into Grand Slam qualifying competitions. Ranked No. 232, he participated in Roland Garros, where he was defeated by wildcard Elliot Benchetrit in the first round.

Cachin then participated in the qualifying competition at Wimbledon, losing in the first round to Tallon Griekspoor.

At the US Open qualifying competition, he lost to Blaž Kavčič in the first round.

=== 2020–2021: Second Challenger title, top 250 debut ===
In 2020, Cachin won the World Tennis Tour title in Paguera, Spain, beating Matthieu Perchicot in the final.

In 2021, Cachin won the 2021 Open de Oeiras II, beating Nuno Borges in the final for his second Challenger title.

He reached the top 250 at world No. 239 on 29 November 2021.

=== 2022: Major debut & first win, Four Challengers, US Open third round & top 60 ===
In January, Cachin reached the second round of qualifying at the Australian Open, defeating ninth seed Francisco Cerundolo before losing to Marco Trungelliti.

In March, Cachin recorded a win over former World No. 3 and 2020 US Open champion, World No. 50 Dominic Thiem at the Andalucía Challenger in Marbella en route to the final where he lost to Jaume Munar.

Cachin qualified for the 2022 French Open as lucky loser to make his Grand Slam singles main-draw debut. He defeated fellow qualifier Norbert Gombos in the first round before losing to Hugo Gaston in the second round. As a result, he made his top 150 debut in the singles rankings on 6 June 2022. He made his top 100 debut after winning his fifth Challenger title in Todi at World No. 98 on 11 July 2022. He moved to No. 66 on 22 August 2022, after his sixth Challenger title in the Dominican Republic.

At the US Open, Cachin received direct entry in to the main draw and defeated Aljaž Bedene in five sets in a fifth set with a super 10-point tiebreak, becoming the first player to win a match at the US Open under the new tiebreak rule. He then defeated wildcard Brandon Holt again in five sets with a super tiebreak after being two sets down to move onto the third round for the first time at a Major. As a result, he entered the top 60 in the singles rankings on 12 September 2022. In October, he faced Andy Murray in the round of 16 of the Gijón Open losing in the third set tiebreak. At the ATP 500 Erste Bank Open in Vienna, he entered the main draw as lucky loser.

Cachin finished the year ranked No. 54.

=== 2023: First ATP title, Masters debut, top 50 ===
Cachin made his Masters debut at Indian Wells defeating Nikoloz Basilashvili in his opening match, then losing to 12th seed Alexander Zverev in the second round.

At the Madrid Open, he reached the fourth round of a Masters tournament for the first time with wins over wildcard entrant Abdullah Shelbayh, 24th seed Francisco Cerúndolo and ninth seed Frances Tiafoe, before losing to lucky loser and eventual runner-up Jan-Lennard Struff.

In July, Cachin won his maiden ATP title in Gstaad, defeating Taro Daniel, top seed Roberto Bautista Agut, Jaume Munar and qualifier Hamad Medjedovic to reach the final, where he overcame Albert Ramos Viñolas in three sets. As a result, he moved up 41 places in the ATP rankings to a new career-high of world No. 49 on 24 July 2023.

Seeded third, he received a bye and then defeated Albert Ramos Viñolas to reach the quarterfinals at the Generali Open, where he lost to fifth seed Laslo Djere.

=== 2024–2025: Nadal match, retirement ===
Cachin endured a nine-month 15-match losing run, before defeating Sebastian Ofner at the Madrid Open in April 2024. He followed this with another win over 20th seed Frances Tiafoe to make it into the third round, at which point he lost to Rafael Nadal in three sets.

Having last played in the qualifying competition at a Challenger tournament in Lyon, France, in June 2025, Cachin announced his retirement from professional tennis on 3 November 2025.

== Performance timeline ==
Key
| W | F | SF | QF | #R | RR | Q# | DNQ | A | NH |

(W) winner; (F) finalist; (SF) semifinalist; (QF) quarterfinalist; (#R) rounds 4, 3, 2, 1; (RR) round-robin stage; (Q#) qualification round; (DNQ) did not qualify; (A) absent; (NH) not held; (SR) strike rate (events won / competed); (W–L) win–loss record.
To avoid confusion and double counting, these charts are updated at the conclusion of a tournament or when the player's participation has ended.

| Tournament | 2015 | 2016 | 2017 | 2018 | 2019 | 2020 | 2021 | 2022 | 2023 | 2024 | SR | W–L | Win % |
|---|---|---|---|---|---|---|---|---|---|---|---|---|---|
Grand Slam tournaments
| Australian Open | A | A | A | A | A | A | A | Q2 | 1R | 1R | 0 / 2 | 0–2 | 0% |
| French Open | A | A | A | A | Q1 | A | A | 2R | 2R | 1R | 0 / 3 | 2–3 | 40% |
| Wimbledon | Q1 | A | A | A | Q1 | NH | A | Q2 | 1R | Q1 | 0 / 1 | 0–1 | 0% |
| US Open | A | A | A | A | Q1 | A | A | 3R | 1R | Q1 | 0 / 2 | 2–2 | 50% |
| Win–loss | 0–0 | 0–0 | 0–0 | 0–0 | 0–0 | 0–0 | 0–0 | 3–2 | 1–4 | 0–2 | 0 / 8 | 4–8 | 33% |
Masters 1000 tournaments
| Indian Wells Masters | A | A | A | A | A | NH | A | A | 2R | 1R | 0 / 2 | 1–2 | 33% |
| Miami Open | A | A | A | A | A | NH | A | A | 1R | 1R | 0 / 2 | 0–2 | 0% |
| Madrid Open | A | A | A | Q1 | A | NH | A | A | 4R | 3R | 0 / 2 | 5–2 | 71% |
| Italian Open | A | A | A | A | A | A | A | A | 1R | 1R | 0 / 2 | 0–2 | 0% |
| Shanghai Masters | A | A | A | A | A | NH | | | 1R | A | 0 / 1 | 0–1 | 0% |
| Paris Masters | A | A | A | A | A | A | A | Q1 | Q1 | A | 0 / 0 | 0–0 | – |
| Year-end ranking | 233 | 491 | 265 | 268 | 363 | 370 | 245 | 57 | 70 | 286 | $2,121,419 | | |

== ATP Tour finals ==
=== Singles: 1 (title) ===
| Legend Grand Slam (0–0) ATP 1000 (0–0) ATP 500 (0–0) ATP 250 (1–0) | Finals by surface Hard (0–0) Clay (1–0) Grass (0–0) | Finals by setting Outdoor (1–0) Indoor (0–0) |

| Result | W–L | Date | Tournament | Tier | Surface | Opponent | Score |
|---|---|---|---|---|---|---|---|
| Win | 1–0 | Jul 2023 | Swiss Open Gstaad, Switzerland | ATP 250 | Clay | (Spain) Albert Ramos Viñolas | 3–6, 6–0, 7–5 |

== ATP Challenger and ITF Tour finals ==
=== Singles: 36 (15–21) ===
| Legend ATP Challenger Tour (6–5) ITF Futures/WTT (9–16) | Finals by surface Hard (0–0) Clay (15–21) |

| Result | W–L | Date | Tournament | Tier | Surface | Opponents | Score |
|---|---|---|---|---|---|---|---|
| Loss | 0–1 | Aug 2013 | Argentina F16, Santiago del Estero | Futures | Clay | (Argentina) Andrés Molteni | 1–6, 6–4, 0–6 |
| Loss | 0–2 | Sep 2013 | Argentina F20, Córdoba | Futures | Clay | (Argentina) Nicolás Kicker | 3–6, 2–6 |
| Loss | 0–3 | Feb 2014 | Argentina F3, Villa Allende | Futures | Clay | (Argentina) Gabriel Alejandro Hidalgo | 1–6, 7–6^{(7–1)}, 1–6 |
| Loss | 0–4 | Mar 2014 | Argentina F5, Rosario | Futures | Clay | (Argentina) Juan Pablo Paz | 3–6, 4–6 |
| Win | 1–4 | Jun 2014 | Italy F19, Siena | Futures | Clay | (France) Gleb Sakharov | 7–6^{(7–2)}, 7–5 |
| Win | 2–4 | Jul 2014 | Spain F19, Dénia | Futures | Clay | (Australia) Maverick Banes | 6–4, 3–6, 6–4 |
| Loss | 2–5 | Sep 2014 | Spain F28, Sevilla | Futures | Clay | (Germany) Daniel Masur | 5–7, 3–6 |
| Loss | 2–6 | Sep 2014 | Spain F29, Sabadell | Futures | Clay | (Spain) Roberto Carballés Baena | 4–6, 4–6 |
| Loss | 2–7 | Feb 2015 | Spain F2, Paguera | Futures | Clay | (Italy) Gianluca Naso | 4–6, 4–6 |
| Win | 1–0 | Sep 2015 | Copa Sevilla, Spain | Challenger | Clay | (Spain) Pablo Carreño Busta | 7–5, 6–3 |
| Loss | 2–8 | Jan 2017 | Spain F2, Manacor | Futures | Clay | (Spain) Ricardo Ojeda Lara | 4–6, 3–6 |
| Win | 3–8 | Mar 2017 | Spain F7, Jávea | Futures | Clay | (Spain) Bernabé Zapata Miralles | 6–3, 6–3 |
| Win | 4–8 | Apr 2017 | Spain F10, Madrid | Futures | Clay | (Russia) Ivan Gakhov | 6–3, 6–3 |
| Win | 5–8 | May 2017 | Spain F13, Valldoreix | Futures | Clay | (Brazil) Orlando Luz | 6–2, 6–1 |
| Loss | 5–9 | May 2017 | Spain F14, Vic | Futures | Clay | (Brazil) Rafael Matos | 6–4, 0–6, 0–1 ret. |
| Loss | 5–10 | Sep 2017 | Spain F29, Sevilla | Futures | Clay | (Spain) Daniel Muñoz de la Nava | 6–7^{(5–7)}, 2–6 |
| Loss | 5–11 | Apr 2018 | Portugal F7, Porto | Futures | Clay | (Hungary) Attila Balázs | 0–6, 4–6 |
| Loss | 5–12 | Apr 2018 | Spain F9, Madrid | Futures | Clay | (Spain) Mario Vilella Martínez | 4–6, 0–6 |
| Loss | 5–13 | Apr 2018 | Spain F10, Majadahonda | Futures | Clay | (Canada) Steven Diez | 3–6, 6–3, 5–7 |
| Win | 6–13 | Jul 2018 | Spain F18, Getxo | Futures | Clay | (Spain) Carlos Boluda-Purkiss | 6–3, 7–5 |
| Loss | 1–1 | Nov 2018 | Buenos Aires Challenger, Argentina | Challenger | Clay | (Spain) Pablo Andújar | 3–6, 1–6 |
| Win | 7–13 | Feb 2020 | M15 Paguera, Spain | WTT | Clay | (France) Matthieu Perchicot | 6–4, 6–2 |
| Loss | 7–14 | Feb 2020 | M25 Antalya, Turkey | WTT | Clay | (Croatia) Duje Ajduković | 6–3, 4–6, 6–7^{(2–7)} |
| Loss | 7–15 | Mar 2020 | M25 Murcia, Spain | WTT | Clay | (Spain) Pablo Llamas Ruiz | 4–6, 6–3, 3–6 |
| Win | 8–15 | Feb 2021 | M15 Antalya, Turkey | WTT | Clay | (Argentina) Matías Zukas | 6–1, 6–4 |
| Win | 9–15 | Mar 2021 | M25 La Nucia, Spain | WTT | Clay | (Ukraine) Georgii Kravchenko | 7–6^{(7–2)}, 6–0 |
| Win | 2–1 | Apr 2021 | Open de Oeiras II, Portugal | Challenger | Clay | (Portugal) Nuno Borges | 7–6^{(7–4)}, 7–6^{(7–3)} |
| Loss | 9–16 | May 2021 | M25 Vic, Spain | WTT | Clay | (Spain) Carlos Gimeno Valero | 6–1, 3–6, 4–6 |
| Loss | 2–2 | Mar 2022 | Andalucía Challenger, Spain | Challenger | Clay | (Spain) Jaume Munar | 2–6, 2–6 |
| Win | 3–2 | Apr 2022 | Open de Madrid, Spain | Challenger | Clay | (Argentina) Marco Trungelliti | 6–3, 6–7^{(3–7)}, 6–3 |
| Win | 4–2 | May 2022 | Prague Open, Czech Republic | Challenger | Clay | (Italy) Lorenzo Giustino | 6–3, 7–6^{(7–4)} |
| Loss | 4–3 | Jun 2022 | Open Sopra Steria de Lyon, France | Challenger | Clay | (France) Corentin Moutet | 4–6, 4–6 |
| Win | 5–3 | Jul 2022 | Internazionali Città di Todi, Italy | Challenger | Clay | (Argentina) Nicolás Kicker | 6–4, 6–4 |
| Loss | 5–4 | Jul 2022 | Internazionali Città di Verona, Italy | Challenger | Clay | (Italy) Francesco Maestrelli | 6–3, 3–6, 0–6 |
| Win | 6–4 | Aug 2022 | Rep. Dominicana Open, Dominican Republic | Challenger | Clay | (Argentina) Marco Trungelliti | 6–4, 2–6, 6–3 |
| Loss | 6–5 | Apr 2023 | Open de Madrid, Spain | Challenger | Clay | Alexander Shevchenko | 4–6, 3–6 |

=== Doubles: 13 (8 titles, 5 runner-ups) ===
| Legend ATP Challenger Tour (2–3) ITF Futures/WTT (6–2) | Finals by surface Hard (0–0) Clay (8–4) Carpet (0–1) |

| Result | W–L | Date | Tournament | Tier | Surface | Partner | Opponents | Score |
|---|---|---|---|---|---|---|---|---|
| Win | 1–0 | Nov 2013 | Chile F9 | Futures | Clay | (Chile) Guillermo Núñez | (Chile) Nicolás Jarry (Chile) Simón Navarro | 7–5, 6–3 |
| Win | 2–0 | Jun 2014 | Italy F19 | Futures | Clay | (Argentina) Pablo Galdón | (France) Gleb Sakharov (France) Alexandre Massa | 6–3, 7–6^{(7–4)} |
| Loss | 2–1 | Aug 2017 | Spain F26 | Futures | Clay | (Spain) Juan Lizariturry | (Spain) Marc Giner (Spain) Jaume Pla Malfeito | 4–6, 7–6^{(7–1)}, [7–10] |
| Win | 1–0 | Sep 2017 | Copa Sevilla, Spain | Challenger | Clay | (Spain) Íñigo Cervantes | (Russia) Ivan Gakhov (Spain) David Vega Hernández | 6–7^{(5–7)}, 6–3, [10–5] |
| Loss | 2–2 | Jan 2018 | Germany F2 | Futures | Carpet (i) | (Germany) Daniel Masur | (Germany) Kevin Krawietz (South Africa) Ruan Roelofse | 3–6, 3–6 |
| Win | 3–2 | Apr 2018 | Spain F9 | Futures | Clay | (Argentina) Patricio Heras | (Ecuador) Diego Hidalgo (Chile) Juan Carlos Sáez | 7–6^{(7–2)}, 3–6, [10–7] |
| Win | 4–2 | Sep 2020 | M25 Prague, Czech Republic | WTT | Clay | (Argentina) Sebastián Báez | (Austria) Lucas Miedler (Poland) Jan Zieliński | 7–6^{(7–4)}, 6–1 |
| Win | 5–2 | Jan 2021 | M15 Antalya, Turkey | WTT | Clay | (Argentina) Juan Manuel Cerúndolo | (Ukraine) Vladyslav Orlov (Kazakhstan) Denis Yevseyev | 7–5, 6–2 |
| Win | 6–2 | Feb 2021 | M15 Antalya, Turkey | WTT | Clay | (Argentina) Genaro Alberto Olivieri | (Colombia) Nicolás Mejía (Spain) Pedro Vives Marcos | 5–7, 6–1, [14–12] |
| Loss | 1–1 | Jun 2021 | Internazionali Città di Forlì, Italy | Challenger | Clay | (Argentina) Camilo Ugo Carabelli | (Peru) Sergio Galdós (Brazil) Orlando Luz | 5–7, 6–2, [8–10] |
| Win | 2–1 | Jul 2021 | Tampere Open, Finland | Challenger | Clay | (Argentina) Facundo Mena | (Brazil) Orlando Luz (Brazil) Felipe Meligeni Alves | 7–5, 6–3 |
| Loss | 2–2 | Mar 2022 | Challenger de Santiago, Chile | Challenger | Clay | (Argentina) Facundo Mena | (Ecuador) Diego Hidalgo (Colombia) Cristian Rodríguez | 4–6, 4–6 |
| Loss | 2–3 | Apr 2022 | Murcia Open, Spain | Challenger | Clay | (Uruguay) Martín Cuevas | (Spain) Íñigo Cervantes (Spain) Oriol Roca Batalla | 7–6^{(7–4)}, 6–7^{(4–7)}, [7–10] |

== Record against top 10 players ==
- Cachin's record against players who have been ranked in the top 10, with those who are active in **boldface**. Only ATP Tour main draw matches and Davis Cup matches are considered:

| Player | Record | Win % | Hard | Clay | Grass | Last match |
|---|---|---|---|---|---|---|
| **Number 1 ranked players** | | | | | | |
| (Serbia) **Novak Djokovic** | 0–1 | 0% | – | – | 0–1 | Lost (3–6, 3–6, 6–7^{(4–7)}) at 2023 Wimbledon |
| (United Kingdom) Andy Murray | 0–1 | 0% | 0–1 | – | – | Lost (6–2, 5–7, 6–7^{(3–7)}) at 2022 Gijón |
| (Spain) Rafael Nadal | 0–1 | 0% | – | 0–1 | – | Lost (1–6, 7–6^{(7–5)}, 3–6) at 2024 Madrid |
| Number 2 ranked players | | | | | | |
| (Germany) **Alexander Zverev** | 0–1 | 0% | 0–1 | – | – | Lost (3–6, 1–6) at 2023 Indian Wells |
| Number 3 ranked players | | | | | | |
| (Austria) Dominic Thiem | 1–0 | 100% | – | 1–0 | – | Won (6–3, 6–2, 6–7^{(1–7)}, 4–6, 6–2) at 2023 French Open |
| (Greece) **Stefanos Tsitsipas** | 0–1 | 0% | – | 0–1 | – | Lost (4–6, 2–6) at 2023 Barcelona |
| (Switzerland) **Stan Wawrinka** | 0–1 | 0% | – | 0–1 | – | Lost (7–6^{(7–4)}, 1–6, 2–6) at 2024 Buenos Aires |
| Number 6 ranked players | | | | | | |
| (France) **Gaël Monfils** | 1–0 | 100% | – | 1–0 | – | Won (2–6, 6–3, 6–4) at 2023 Lyon |
| Number 8 ranked players | | | | | | |
| (United Kingdom) **Cameron Norrie** | 1–1 | 50% | 0–1 | 1–0 | – | Lost (6–3, 2–6, 6–7^{(1–7)}) at 2022 Vienna |
| (Russia) **Karen Khachanov** | 0–1 | 0% | 0–1 | – | – | Lost (2–6, 4–6) at 2023 Adelaide 1 |
| Number 9 ranked players | | | | | | |
| (Spain) **Roberto Bautista Agut** | 1–0 | 100% | – | 1–0 | – | Won (7–6^{(7–4)}, 7–6^{(7–3)}) at 2023 Gstaad |
| Number 10 ranked players | | | | | | |
| (United States) **Frances Tiafoe** | 2–0 | 100% | – | 2–0 | – | Won (7–6^{(7–1)}, 3–6, 6–4) at 2024 Madrid |
| (Spain) **Pablo Carreño Busta** | 1–1 | 50% | 0–1 | 1–0 | – | Lost (6–7^{(4–7)}, 1–6, 6–7^{(3–7)}) at 2023 Australian Open |
| **Total** | **7–9** | **44%** | **0–5 (0%)** | **7–3 (70%)** | **0–1 (0%)** | *** Statistics correct as of 30 April 2024.** |
