= Santo Domingo Open (tennis) =

Tennis tournament in the Dominican Republic

- 2024 RD Open

Defunct tennis tournament
- Event name: Santo Domingo Open
- Location: Santo Domingo; Dominican Republic
- Venue: Santo Domingo Tennis Club (La Bocha)
- Category: ATP Challenger Tour 125
- Surface: Green clay
- Draw: 32S/32Q/16D
- Prize money: $125,000+H
- Website: rdopen.com

The RD Open was a professional tennis tournament played on outdoor green clay courts in the Dominican Republic (originally known as the Milex Open). It was part of the ATP Challenger Tour from 2015 until 2024. The tournament was held in the Santo Domingo Tennis Club (La Bocha) in Santo Domingo, Dominican Republic.

== Past finals ==
=== Singles ===
Year	Champion	Runner-up	Score
2024	(Bosnia and Herzegovina) Damir Džumhur	(Ecuador) Andrés Andrade	6–4, 6–4
2023	(Argentina) Genaro Alberto Olivieri	(Argentina) Marco Trungelliti	7–5, 2–6, 6–4
2022	(Argentina) Pedro Cachin	(Argentina) Marco Trungelliti	6–4, 2–6, 6–3
2021	Not held		
2020	Not held		
2019	(Peru) Juan Pablo Varillas	(Argentina) Federico Coria	6–3, 2–6, 6–2
2018	(Chile) Christian Garín	(Argentina) Federico Delbonis	6–4, 5–7, 6–4
2017	(Dominican Republic) Víctor Estrella Burgos	(Bosnia and Herzegovina) Damir Džumhur	7–6^{(7–4)}, 6–4
2016	(Argentina) Guido Andreozzi	(Argentina) Nicolás Kicker	6–0, 6–4
2015	(Bosnia and Herzegovina) Damir Džumhur	(Argentina) Renzo Olivo	7–5, 3–1, ret.

=== Doubles ===
Year	Champions	Runners-up	Score
2024	(Ecuador) Diego Hidalgo (Mexico) Miguel Ángel Reyes-Varela	(India) Sriram Balaji (Brazil) Fernando Romboli	6–7^{(2–7)}, 6–4, [18–16]
2023	(Brazil) Pedro Boscardin Dias (Brazil) Gustavo Heide	(Ecuador) Diego Hidalgo (Colombia) Cristian Rodríguez	6–4, 7–5
2022	(Philippines) Ruben Gonzales (United States) Reese Stalder	(Colombia) Nicolás Barrientos (Mexico) Miguel Ángel Reyes-Varela	7–6^{(7–5)}, 6–3
2021	Not held		
2020	Not held		
2019	(Uruguay) Ariel Behar (Ecuador) Gonzalo Escobar	(Brazil) Orlando Luz (Venezuela) Luis David Martínez	6–7^{(5–7)}, 6–4, [12–10]
2018	(India) Leander Paes (Mexico) Miguel Ángel Reyes-Varela	(Uruguay) Ariel Behar (Ecuador) Roberto Quiroz	4–6, 6–3, [10–5]
2017	(Argentina) Juan Ignacio Londero (Venezuela) Luis David Martínez	(Colombia) Daniel Elahi Galán (Colombia) Santiago Giraldo	6–4, 6–4
2016	(Uruguay) Ariel Behar (Ecuador) Giovanni Lapentti	(France) Jonathan Eysseric (Croatia) Franko Škugor	7–5, 6–4
2015	(Venezuela) Roberto Maytín (Chile) Hans Podlipnik Castillo	(Monaco) Romain Arneodo (Monaco) Benjamin Balleret	6–3, 2–6, [10–4]
