= Peter Bertran =

Dominican Republic tennis player (born 1996)

- Country (sports): Dominican Republic
- Born: 5 March 1996 (age 30) Santo Domingo, Dominican Republic
- Height: 1.83 m (6 ft 0 in)
- Plays: Right-handed (two-handed backhand)
- College: South Florida
- Coach: John Bertran, Carlos Oquet
- Prize money: US $91,949

Singles
- Career record: 3–4 (at ATP Tour level, Grand Slam level, and in Davis Cup)
- Career titles: 0
- Highest ranking: No. 461 (23 December 2024)
- Current ranking: No. 945 (19 October 2026)

Doubles
- Career record: 2–3 (at ATP Tour level, Grand Slam level, and in Davis Cup)
- Career titles: 0
- Highest ranking: No. 455 (14 August 2023)
- Current ranking: No. 1,689 (19 October 2026)
- Last updated on: 19 October 2026.

Peter Bertran (born 5 March 1996) is a professional tennis player from Dominican Republic. He has a career-high ATP singles ranking of No. 461, achieved on 23 December 2024 and a best doubles ranking of No. 455, achieved on 14 August 2023.

Bertran represents the Dominican Republic at the Davis Cup, where he has a W/L record of 1–1.

Bertran played college tennis at the University of South Florida from 2015 to 2018 after playing his freshman year at the University of Georgia.

== Junior career ==
As a junior, Bertran achieved a career high ranking of No. 97 in the world junior rankings by the International Tennis Federation.

In 2014, he reached the main draw of the 2014 French Open Junior Championships before losing to Karen Kachanov in the 1st round and reached the 2nd round of the qualifying draw in the Wimbledon Junior Championships.

== Challenger and World Tennis Tour Finals ==
=== Singles: 7 (5–2) ===
Legend (singles) ATP Challenger Tour (0–0) ITF World Tennis Tour (5–2)	Titles by surface Hard (5–2) Clay (0–0) Grass (0–0) Carpet (0–0)

Result	W–L	Date	Tournament	Tier	Surface	Opponent	Score
Win	1–0	Dec 2019	M15 Santo Domingo, Dominican Rep.	World Tennis Tour	Hard	(Dominican Republic) Nick Hardt	4–6, 6–1, 6–4
Win	2–0	Dec 2021	M15 Santo Domingo, Dominican Rep.	World Tennis Tour	Hard	(Italy) Marco Brugnerotto	6–3, 6–3
Win	3–0	May 2022	M15 Cancun, Mexico	World Tennis Tour	Hard	(United States) Joshua Sheehy	6–3, 6–1
Loss	3–1	Sep 2023	M15 Monastir, Tunisia	World Tennis Tour	Hard	(France) Fabien Salle	6–7^{(4–7)}, 1–6
Loss	3–2	Jun 2023	M15 Santo Domingo, Dominican Rep.	World Tennis Tour	Hard	(Canada) Taha Baadi	5–7, 4–6
Win	4–2	Jul 2024	M15 Huamantla, Mexico	World Tennis Tour	Hard	(Colombia) Juan Sebastian Gomez	6–4, 6–3
Win	5–2	Aug 2024	M15 Huamantla, Mexico	World Tennis Tour	Hard	(Brazil) Eduardo Ribeiro	6–3, 7–5
