= José Olivares =

Dominican Republic tennis player

- Country (sports): Dominican Republic
- Residence: Santo Domingo, Dominican Republic
- Born: 8 January 1997 (age 29) Santo Domingo, Dominican Republic
- Height: 1.63 m (5 ft 4 in)
- Plays: Right-handed (two-handed backhand)
- Coach: Jose Juan Lorenzo
- Prize money: $38,777

Singles
- Career record: 2–5 (at ATP Tour level, Grand Slam level, and in Davis Cup)
- Career titles: 1 ITF
- Highest ranking: No. 605 (28 October 2019)

Doubles
- Career record: 1–1 (at ATP Tour level, Grand Slam level, and in Davis Cup)
- Career titles: 1 ITF
- Highest ranking: No. 689 (20 November 2017)

José Olivares (Spanish pronunciation: [xoˈse oliˈβaɾes]; born 8 January 1997) is an inactive Dominican tennis player.

Olivares has a career high ATP singles ranking of No. 605 achieved on 28 October 2019 and a career high ATP doubles ranking of No. 689 achieved on 20 November 2017.

Olivares represents the Dominican Republic in the Davis Cup. He was first nominated to the team for the 2014 Davis Cup and has played in matches against Marcelo Tomás Barrios Vera, Hans Podlipnik-Castillo, and Juan Sebastián Cabal.
