= Nick Hardt =

Dominican Republic tennis player (born 2000)

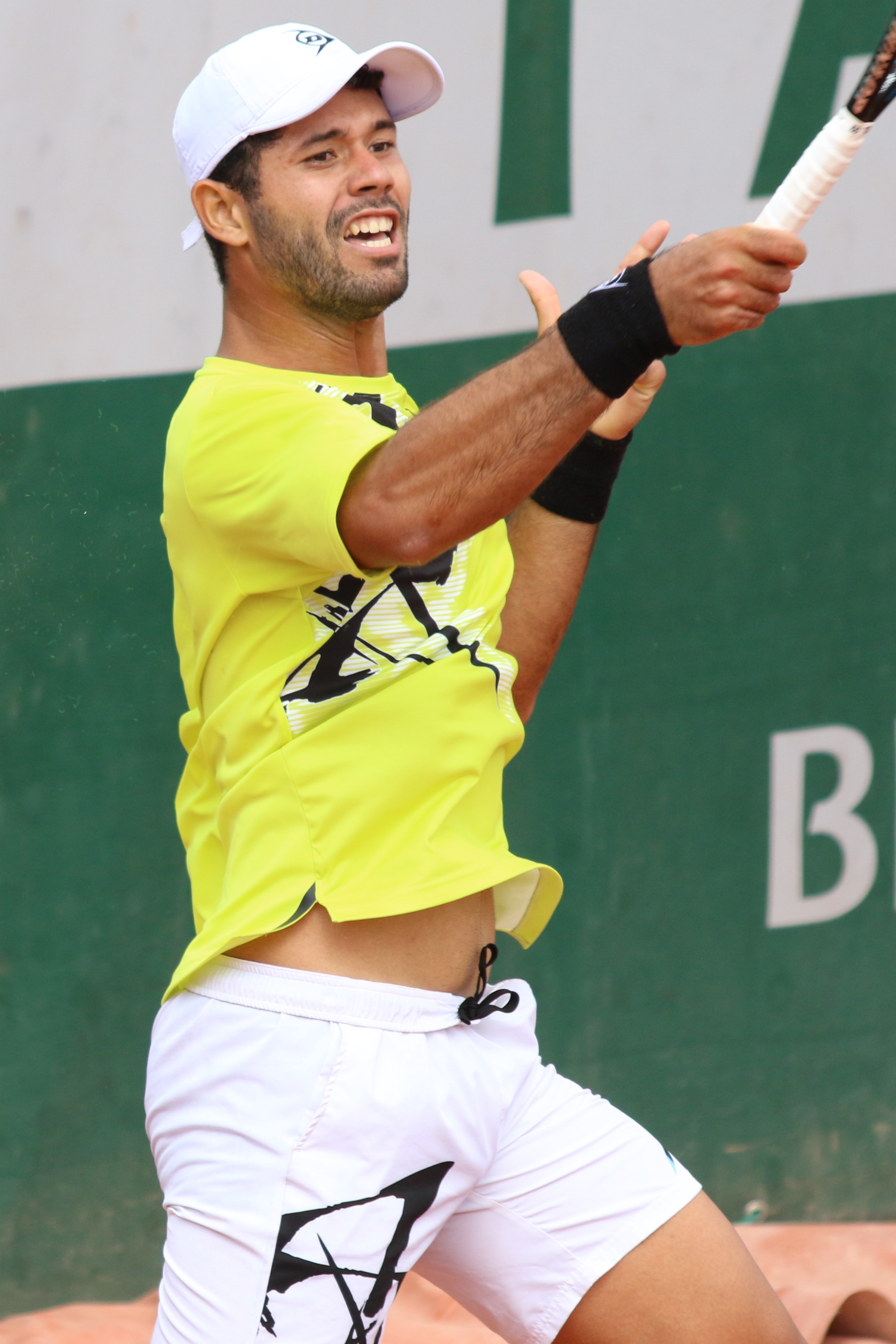
- Hardt at the 2023 French Open
- Country (sports): Dominican Republic
- Residence: Sosúa, Dominican Republic
- Born: 20 September 2000 (age 25) Santiago de los Caballeros, Dominican Republic
- Height: 1.83 m (6 ft 0 in)
- Plays: Right-handed (two handed-backhand)
- Prize money: US $410,643

Singles
- Career record: 5–6 (at ATP Tour level, Grand Slam level, and in Davis Cup)
- Career titles: 0
- Highest ranking: No. 177 (26 August 2024)
- Current ranking: No. 390 (8 June 2026)

Grand Slam singles results
- Australian Open: Q1 (2023, 2025)
- French Open: Q2 (2023)
- Wimbledon: Q2 (2024)
- US Open: Q1 (2024)

Doubles
- Career record: 3–6 (at ATP Tour level, Grand Slam level, and in Davis Cup)
- Career titles: 0
- Highest ranking: No. 282 (24 August 2023)
- Current ranking: No. 2,047 (8 June 2026)

Team competitions
- Davis Cup: 5–10
Medal record
Men's tennis
Representing the Dominican Republic
Pan American Games
Bronze medal – third place	2023 Santiago	Doubles
Central American and Caribbean Games
Gold medal – first place	2023 San Salvador	Singles
Gold medal – first place	2023 San Salvador	Nations Cup
Gold medal – first place	2026 Santo Domingo	Singles
Gold medal – first place	2026 Santo Domingo	Nations Cup
Bronze medal – third place	2023 San Salvador	Doubles
- Last updated on: 28 August 2026.

Nick Hardt (born 20 September 2000) is a Dominican professional tennis player. He has a career high ATP singles ranking of world No. 177 achieved on 26 August 2024 and a doubles ranking of No. 282 achieved on 24 August 2023. He is currently the No. 1 Dominican player.

Hardt represents the Dominican Republic in the Davis Cup.

Hardt won the 2023 Central American and Caribbean Games singles and nations cup golden medal and bronze in doubles with Roberto Cid. He also won golden medals at home during the 2026 Central American and Caribbean Games in singles and nations cup.

== Junior career ==
Hardt was ranked No. 16 in the world junior rankings by the ITF on 5 March 2018.

In 2016, he won the XXV Copa Merengue tournament in Santo Domingo, Dominican Republic, becoming the youngest Dominican to win the title at 15 years of age.

In 2017, he reached the quarterfinals of the Eddie Herr Junior Championships ITF tournament where he lost to eventual champion, Bulgarian Adrian Andreev.

In 2018, he reached the quarterfinals of the 2018 French Open Junior Championships and the third round in the 2018 U.S. Open Junior Championships. Hardt also reached the finals of the 2018 Porto Alegre Junior Championships losing to the No. 1 ranked junior in the world Sebastián Báez in the finals.

== Professional career ==
=== 2017: Davis Cup debut ===
Hardt was first nominated to the team for the 2017 Davis Cup and faced Chilean tennis player Nicolás Jarry in his first match.

=== 2022: Maiden Challenger final, top 205 debut ===
He reached his maiden Challenger final at the 2022 JC Ferrero Challenger Open. As a result, he moved more than 35 positions up to a new career-high in the top 250 on 10 October 2022. Two months later, he reached a career-high of No. 201 on 22 December 2022.

=== 2024: Maiden Challenger title, ATP debut and first win, top 200 ===
Ranked No. 301, he won his maiden Challenger title as an alternate at the Sánchez-Casal Mapfre Cup in Barcelona defeating wildcard and second seed Bernabe Zapata Miralles. He was only the second Challenger champion from the Dominican Republic. As a result, he raised 70 positions up in the rankings to return to the top 230.

Ranked No. 229, he qualified for the ATP 500 tournament at the Barcelona Open making his ATP debut, having entered the qualifying competition as an alternate. There, he earned his first ATP Tour win, defeating wildcard Martin Landaluce in three sets, becoming the first Dominican player to win an ATP tour-level match since Víctor Estrella Burgos in 2018 Quito. As a result of his win, he moved 25 positions up close to his career-high. He lost to 13th seed Tomás Martín Etcheverry in the second round.

On 20 May 2024, he made into the top 200 in the singles rankings after reaching the semifinals at the 2024 Internazionali di Tennis Francavilla al Mare Challenger in Italy.

== ATP Challenger and Futures/ITF World Tennis Tour finals ==
=== Singles: 25 (17–8) ===
Legend (singles) ATP Challenger Tour (2–1) Futures/ITF World Tennis Tour (15–7)	Finals by surface Hard (3–5) Clay (14–3) Grass (0–0) Carpet (0–0)

Result	W–L	Date	Tournament	Tier	Surface	Opponent	Score
Win	1–0	Dec 2018	Dominican Republic F3, Santo Domingo	Futures	Hard	(Chile) Alejandro Tabilo	7–5, 6–3
Win	2–0	Jul 2019	M15 Saarlouis, Germany	World Tennis Tour	Clay	(Italy) Fabrizio Ornago	6–0, 6–4
Loss	2–1	Dec 2019	M15 Santo Domingo, Dominican Republic	World Tennis Tour	Hard	(Dominican Republic) Peter Bertran	6–4, 1–6, 4–6
Win	3–1	Dec 2020	M15 Santo Domingo, Dominican Republic	World Tennis Tour	Hard	(United States) Oliver Crawford	6–4, 6–0
Win	4–1	May 2021	M15 Antalya, Turkey	World Tennis Tour	Clay	(Austria) Alexander Erler	6–0, 7–6^{(9–7)}
Win	5–1	May 2021	M15 Antalya, Turkey	World Tennis Tour	Clay	(United States) Nicolas Moreno de Alboran	2–6, 7–5, 6–1
Win	6–1	Jul 2021	M25 Belgrade, Serbia	World Tennis Tour	Clay	(Israel) Daniel Cukierman	3–6, 6–3, 6–3
Loss	6–2	Jul 2021	M25 Marburg, Germany	World Tennis Tour	Clay	(Germany) Louis Wessels	6–4, 5–7, 6–7^{(5–7)}
Win	7–2	Jul 2021	M25 Dénia, Spain	World Tennis Tour	Clay	(France) Calvin Hemery	7–6^{(7–3)}, 7–6^{(7–4)}
Loss	7–3	Feb 2022	M25 Santo Domingo, Domican Republic	World Tennis Tour	Hard	(Chinese Taipei) Wu Tung-lin	5–7, 3–6
Win	8–3	May 2022	M25 La Nucia, Spain	World Tennis Tour	Clay	(France) Laurent Lokoli	6–0, 6–4
Win	9–3	Jul 2022	M25 Dénia, Spain	World Tennis Tour	Clay	(Argentina) Mariano Navone	3–6, 6–3, 6–2
Loss	9–4	Aug 2022	M25 Wetzlar, Germany	World Tennis Tour	Clay	(Germany) Rudolf Molleker	6–7^{(3–7)}, 1–6
Loss	9–5	Oct 2022	Alicante, Spain	Challenger	Hard	(Slovakia) Lukáš Klein	3–6, 4–6
Win	10–5	Dec 2022	M15 Santo Domingo, Dominican Republic	World Tennis Tour	Hard	(Canada) Liam Draxl	6–4, 6–3
Win	11–5	Feb 2024	M25 Antalya, Turkey	World Tennis Tour	Clay	(France) Clement Tabur	6–1, 6–4
Loss	11–6	Feb 2024	M25 Antalya, Turkey	World Tennis Tour	Clay	(Spain) Daniel Mérida	6–1, 5–7, 3–6
Loss	11–7	Mar 2024	M25 Santo Domingo, Dominican Republic	World Tennis Tour	Hard	(United States) Thai-Son Kwiatkowski	4–6, 4–6
Win	12–7	Apr 2024	Barcelona, Spain	Challenger	Clay	(Spain) Bernabé Zapata Miralles	6–4, 3–6, 6–2
Win	13–7	Sep 2025	M25 Sabadell, Spain	World Tennis Tour	Clay	(Italy) Lorenzo Giustino	6–4, 3–6, 6–2
Loss	13–8	Feb 2026	M15 San José, Costa Rica	World Tennis Tour	Hard	(Jamaica) Blaise Bicknell	2–6, 4–6
Win	14–8	Apr 2026	M15 Orange Park, United States	World Tennis Tour	Clay	(Norway) Andreja Petrovic	1–6, 6–1, 6–4
Win	15–8	May 2026	M25 Pensacola, United States	World Tennis Tour	Clay	(United States) Ryan Colby	2–6, 6–1, 6–3
Win	16–8	Jun 2026	M25 Cuiabá, Brazil	World Tennis Tour	Clay	(Argentina) Carlos María Zárate	6–2, 6–2
Win	17–8	Jun 2026	Asunción, Paraguay	Challenger	Clay	(Argentina) Juan Estévez	7–6^{(7–0)}, 4–6, 6–2

=== Doubles: 8 (6–2) ===
Legend (doubles) ATP Challenger Tour (0–0) Futures/ITF World Tennis Tour (6–2)	Finals by surface Hard (4–2) Clay (2–0) Grass (0–0) Carpet (0–0)

Result	W–L	Date	Tournament	Tier	Surface	Partner	Opponents	Score
Loss	0–1	Dec 2017	Dominican Republic F3, Santo Domingo	Futures	Hard	(Dominican Republic) José Olivares	(Portugal) Bernardo Saraiva (Netherlands) Sem Verbeek	3–6, 4–6
Win	1–1	Aug 2019	M15 Brussels, Belgium	World Tennis Tour	Clay	(Germany) Luca Gelhardt	(Netherlands) Jesper de Jong (Netherlands) Alec Deckers	6–4, 6–4
Win	2–1	Aug 2019	M15 Eupen, Belgium	World Tennis Tour	Clay	(Belgium) Michael Geerts	(Argentina) Genaro Alberto Olivieri (Argentina) Gonzalo Villanueva	6–7^{(10–12)}, 6–2, [10–3]
Win	3–1	Dec 2019	M15 Santo Domingo, Dominican Republic	World Tennis Tour	Hard	(United States) Maksim Tikhomirov	(Brazil) Alex Blumenberg (Brazil) João Hinsching	6–2, 6–3
Loss	3–2	Sep 2020	M15 Sintra, Portugal	World Tennis Tour	Hard	(Russia) Savriyan Danilov	(Germany) Fabian Fallert (United States) Nicolas Moreno de Alboran	6–7^{(4–7)}, 4–6
Win	4–2	Dec 2020	M15 Santo Domingo, Dominican Republic	World Tennis Tour	Hard	(Japan) Shintaro Mochizuki	(Chile) Gonzalo Lama (Ecuador) Antonio Cayetano March	6–3, 6–3
Win	5–2	Dec 2020	M15 Santo Domingo, Dominican Republic	World Tennis Tour	Hard	(Japan) Shintaro Mochizuki	(United States) Nick Chappell (United States) Keegan Smith	4–6, 7–6^{(7–2)}, [10–5]
Win	6–2	Feb 2021	M15 Sharm El Sheikh, Egypt	World Tennis Tour	Hard	(United States) Nicolas Moreno de Alboran	(Belgium) Arnaud Bovy (United Kingdom) Aidan McHugh	6–3, 6–4

== Davis Cup ==
=== Participations: (7–10) ===
Group membership World Group (0–0) Qualifying Round (0–0) WG play-off (0–0) Group I (1–4) Group II (6–6) Group III (0–0) Group IV (0–0)	Matches by surface Hard (7–6) Clay (0–4) Grass (0–0) Carpet (0–0)	Matches by type Singles (4–4) Doubles (3–6)

- ▲ ▼ indicates the outcome of the Davis Cup match followed by the score, date, place of event, the zonal classification and its phase, and the court surface.

Rubber outcome	No.	Rubber	Match type (partner if any)	Opponent nation	Opponent player(s)	Score
▼0–5; 3–5 February 2017; Centro De Tenis Parque Del Este, Santo Domingo Este, Dominican Republic; Americas Zone Group I first round; hard surface
Defeat	1	V	Singles	Chile	Nicolás Jarry	3–6, 3–6
▼2–3; 2–3 February 2018; Club Deportivo Naco, Santo Domingo, Dominican Republic; Americas Zone Group I first round; hard surface
Defeat	2	III	Doubles (with José Olivares)	Brazil	Marcelo Demoliner / Marcelo Melo	3–6, 4–6
▲4–0; 6–7 April 2018; Centro De Tenis Parque Del Este, Santo Domingo Este, Dominican Republic; Americas Zone Group I second round; hard surface
Victory	3	III	Doubles (with José Olivares)	Barbados	Xavier Lawrence / Kaipo Marshall	6–3, 6–1
▼1–3; 14–15 September 2019; Carrasco Lawn Tennis Club, Montevideo, Uruguay; Americas Zone Group I first round; clay surface
Defeat	4	III	Doubles (with Víctor Estrella Burgos)	Uruguay	Martín Cuevas / Pablo Cuevas	4–6, 3–6
▼1–3; 6-7 March 2020; Club de Tenis Santa Cruz, Santa Cruz de la Sierra, Bolivia; World Group I Play-off first round; clay surface
Defeat	5	III	Doubles (with Roberto Cid Subervi)	Bolivia	Hugo Dellien / Federico Zeballos	3–6, 2–6
▼2–3; 17-18 September 2021; Cité Nationale Sportive El Menzah, Tunis, Tunisia; World Group II first round; hard surface
Victory	6	I	Singles	Tunisia	Malek Jaziri	4–6, 6–1, 6–5 ret.
Defeat	7	III	Doubles (with Roberto Cid Subervi)	Tunisia	Aziz Dougaz / Aziz Ouakaa	4–6, 6–7^{(3–7)}
Defeat	8	V	Singles	Tunisia	Aziz Dougaz	3–6, 4–6
▲3–0; 4-5 March 2022; Centro Nacional de Tenis, Santo Domingo, Dominican Republic; World Group II play-off; hard surface
Victory	9	I	Singles	Vietnam	Trịnh Linh Giang	6–1, 6–4
Victory	10	III	Doubles (with Peter Bertran)	Vietnam	Lê Quốc Khánh / Lý Hoàng Nam	6–7^{(7–9)}, 6–4, 6–1
▼2–3; 16-17 September 2022; National Tennis Centre, Jūrmala, Latvia; World Group II first round; hard (indoor) surface
Defeat	11	II	Singles	Latvia	Kārlis Ozoliņš	3–6, 4–6
Defeat	12	III	Doubles (with Víctor Estrella Burgos)	Latvia	Kārlis Ozoliņš / Robert Strombachs	3–6, 6–4, 3–6
Victory	13	IV	Singles (dead rubber)	Latvia	Daniels Tens	6–2, 6–2
▼0–4; 4-5 February 2023; Monte Carlo Country Club, Roquebrune-Cap-Martin, France; World Group II play-off; clay surface
Defeat	14	II	Singles	Monaco	Lucas Catarina	3–6, 4–6
Defeat	15	III	Doubles (with Roberto Cid Subervi)	Monaco	Romain Arneodo / Hugo Nys	6–7^{(1–7)}, 3–6
▲3–1; 6-7 February 2026; Centro Nacional de Tenis, Santo Domingo, Dominican Republic; World Group II play-off; hard surface
Victory	16	II	Singles	Latvia	Robert Strombachs	7–5, 6–7^{(2–7)}, 6–2
Victory	17	III	Doubles (with Peter Bertran)	Latvia	Kārlis Ozoliņš / Robert Strombachs	6–4, 7–6^{(7–2)}
