= 2013 ITF Men's Circuit (July–September) =

Men's tennis tournament in 2013

The 2013 ITF Men's Circuit was the 2013 edition of the entry level tour for men's professional tennis, and is the third tier tennis tour below the Association of Tennis Professionals, World Tour and Challenger Tour. It is organised by the International Tennis Federation (ITF) who additionally organizes the ITF Women's Circuit which is an entry level tour for women's professional tennis. Future tournaments are organized to offer either $10,000 or $15,000 in prize money and tournaments which offering hospitality to players competing in the main draw give additional ranking points which are valid under the ATP ranking system, and are to be organized by a national association or approved by the ITF Men's Circuit Committee.

== Point distribution ==
Tournament Category	W	F	SF	QF	R16	R32
Futures 15,000+H	35	20	10	4	1	0
Futures 15,000	27	15	8	3	1	0
Futures 10,000+H	27	15	8	3	1	0
Futures 10,000	18	10	6	2	1	0

== Key ==
$15,000 tournaments
$10,000 tournaments

== Month ==
=== July ===
Week of	Tournament	Winner	Runners-up	Semifinalists	Quarterfinalists
July 1	Austria F2 Futures; Seefeld, Austria; Clay $10,000	Patrick Ofner; 7–5, 3–6, 6–4	Federico Gaio	Mislav Hizak; Dominik Süč	Lukas Jastraunig; Dennis Novak; Filip Horanský; Yannick Maden
July 1	Austria F2 Futures; Seefeld, Austria; Clay $10,000	Lukas Jastraunig; Tristan-Samuel Weissborn; 7–6^{(7–5)}, 6–3	Michal Franěk; Jan Kunčík	Mislav Hizak; Dominik Süč	Lukas Jastraunig; Dennis Novak; Filip Horanský; Yannick Maden
July 1	Belgium F3 Futures; De Haan, Belgium; Clay $10,000	Dimitar Grabul; 7–5, 2–6, 6–4	Joris De Loore	Juan Carlos Sáez; Maverick Banes	Romain Bogaerts; Kimmer Coppejans; Kevin Griekspoor; Alexandre Folie
July 1	Belgium F3 Futures; De Haan, Belgium; Clay $10,000	Joris De Loore; Juan Carlos Sáez; 6–1, 6–4	Juan Matías González Carrasco; Nicolás Kicker	Juan Carlos Sáez; Maverick Banes	Romain Bogaerts; Kimmer Coppejans; Kevin Griekspoor; Alexandre Folie
July 1	Bulgaria F6 Futures; Haskovo, Bulgaria; Clay $10,000	Dino Marcan; 6–4, 6–0	Enzo Py	Tihomir Grozdanov; Mathias Bourgue	Grégoire Barrère; Yaraslav Shyla; Andrey Rublev; Pirmin Hänle
July 1	Bulgaria F6 Futures; Haskovo, Bulgaria; Clay $10,000	Julien Demois; Gleb Sakharov; 3–6, 6–3, [10–5]	Dinko Halachev; Petar Trendafilov	Tihomir Grozdanov; Mathias Bourgue	Grégoire Barrère; Yaraslav Shyla; Andrey Rublev; Pirmin Hänle
July 1	Canada F3 Futures; Kelowna, Canada; Hard $15,000	Philip Bester; 6–7^{(9–11)}, 7–6^{(8–6)}, 6–3	Brayden Schnur	Tyler Hochwalt; Nicolas Meister	Benjamin Mitchell; Milan Pokrajac; Filip Peliwo; Henry Choi
July 1	Canada F3 Futures; Kelowna, Canada; Hard $15,000	Roman Borvanov; Milan Pokrajac; 6–4, 7–5	Kyle McMorrow; Nicolas Meister	Tyler Hochwalt; Nicolas Meister	Benjamin Mitchell; Milan Pokrajac; Filip Peliwo; Henry Choi
July 1	Egypt F14 Futures; Sharm El Sheikh, Egypt; Clay $10,000	Mohamed Safwat; 6–2, 6–3	Omar Giacalone	Sherif Sabry; Ivan Nedelko	Yahor Yatsyk; Karim-Mohamed Maamoun; Markos Kalovelonis; Hicham Khaddari
July 1	Egypt F14 Futures; Sharm El Sheikh, Egypt; Clay $10,000	Markos Kalovelonis; Angelos Lenis; 6–4, 3–6, [10–6]	Karim Hossam; Karim-Mohamed Maamoun	Sherif Sabry; Ivan Nedelko	Yahor Yatsyk; Karim-Mohamed Maamoun; Markos Kalovelonis; Hicham Khaddari
July 1	France F11 Futures; Montauban, France; Clay $15,000+H	Pierre-Hugues Herbert; 6–2, 2–6, 6–3	Benjamin Balleret	Germain Gigounon; Sébastien Boltz	Calvin Hemery; Oliver Golding; Rémi Boutillier; Dante Gennaro
July 1	France F11 Futures; Montauban, France; Clay $15,000+H	Benjamin Balleret; Pierre-Hugues Herbert; 6–4, 7–6^{(10–8)}	Julien Obry; Adrien Puget	Germain Gigounon; Sébastien Boltz	Calvin Hemery; Oliver Golding; Rémi Boutillier; Dante Gennaro
July 1	Germany F8 Futures; Kassel, Germany; Clay $15,000+H	Kristijan Mesaroš; 6–3, 6–2	Bastian Knittel	Cristóbal Saavedra Corvalán; Miloslav Mečíř	Michael Lammer; Yannik Reuter; Maximilian Abel; Kevin Krawietz
July 1	Germany F8 Futures; Kassel, Germany; Clay $15,000+H	Kevin Krawietz; Kristijan Mesaroš; 6–4, 7–6^{(7–4)}	Marek Michalička; David Pultr	Cristóbal Saavedra Corvalán; Miloslav Mečíř	Michael Lammer; Yannik Reuter; Maximilian Abel; Kevin Krawietz
July 1	Great Britain F12 Futures; Manchester, Great Britain; Grass $10,000	Daniel Cox; 6–3, 6–2	Tom Farquharson	Brydan Klein; Richard Gabb	Marcus Willis; Robert Carter; Lewis Burton; Joe Salisbury
July 1	Great Britain F12 Futures; Manchester, Great Britain; Grass $10,000	Albano Olivetti; Neal Skupski; 7–6^{(7–4)}, 6–3	Zach Itzstein; Brydan Klein	Brydan Klein; Richard Gabb	Marcus Willis; Robert Carter; Lewis Burton; Joe Salisbury
July 1	Italy F15 Futures; Mantova, Italy; Clay $15,000+H	Riccardo Bellotti; 7–5, 6–0	Marin Bradarić	Yann Marti; Alessandro Bega	Piotr Gadomski; Walter Trusendi; Andrea Basso; Daniele Giorgini
July 1	Italy F15 Futures; Mantova, Italy; Clay $15,000+H	Adam Chadaj; Piotr Gadomski; 6–3, 1–6, [11–9]	Francesco Borgo; Marco Bortolotti	Yann Marti; Alessandro Bega	Piotr Gadomski; Walter Trusendi; Andrea Basso; Daniele Giorgini
July 1	Japan F8 Futures; Kashiwa, Japan; Hard $10,000	Hiroki Kondo; 6–3, 7–5	Takao Suzuki	Arata Onozawa; Yasutaka Uchiyama	José Statham; Toshihide Matsui; Yuuya Kibi; Cao Zhaoyi
July 1	Japan F8 Futures; Kashiwa, Japan; Hard $10,000	Hiroki Kondo; José Statham; 6–4, 6–2	Toshihide Matsui; Bumpei Sato	Arata Onozawa; Yasutaka Uchiyama	José Statham; Toshihide Matsui; Yuuya Kibi; Cao Zhaoyi
July 1	Netherlands F4 Futures; Middelburg, Netherlands; Clay $15,000	Thomas Schoorel; 6–3, 6–4	Niels Desein	Alexis Musialek; Wesley Koolhof	Torsten Wietoska; Matwé Middelkoop; Colin van Beem; Wilson Leite
July 1	Netherlands F4 Futures; Middelburg, Netherlands; Clay $15,000	Romano Frantzen; Thomas Schoorel; 6–4, 1–6, [10–8]	Stephan Fransen; Wesley Koolhof	Alexis Musialek; Wesley Koolhof	Torsten Wietoska; Matwé Middelkoop; Colin van Beem; Wilson Leite
July 1	Romania F6 Futures; Focșani, Romania; Clay $10,000	Michael Bois; 1–6, 7–5, 6–4	Teodor-Dacian Crăciun	Francesco Picco; Andras Szekely	Maxime Forcin; Yan Sabanin; Giulio Torroni; Claudio Fortuna
July 1	Romania F6 Futures; Focșani, Romania; Clay $10,000	Davide Melchiorre; Francesco Picco; 6–3, 7–5	Antonio Campo; Vasco Mensurado	Francesco Picco; Andras Szekely	Maxime Forcin; Yan Sabanin; Giulio Torroni; Claudio Fortuna
July 1	Spain F20 Futures; Bakio, Spain; Hard $10,000	Chen Ti; 6–3, 6–3	Carlos Boluda-Purkiss	Joshua Milton; João Domingues	Ricardo Ojeda Lara; Juan-Samuel Arauzo-Martínez; Oriol Roca Batalla; Roberto Ortega Olmedo
July 1	Spain F20 Futures; Bakio, Spain; Hard $10,000	João Domingues; André Gaspar Murta; 6–2, 6–2	Iván Arenas-Gualda; Juan Lizariturry	Joshua Milton; João Domingues	Ricardo Ojeda Lara; Juan-Samuel Arauzo-Martínez; Oriol Roca Batalla; Roberto Ortega Olmedo
July 1	Turkey F26 Futures; Kayseri, Turkey; Hard $10,000	Dzmitry Zhyrmont; 6–3, 6–1	David Sofaer	Ruan Roelofse; Chris Cooprider	Dean O'Brien; Henrique Cunha; Sam Barry; Mikhail Fufygin
July 1	Turkey F26 Futures; Kayseri, Turkey; Hard $10,000	Alexander Igoshin; Vitaliy Kachanovskiy; 6–4, 6–2	Chris Cooprider; David Porter	Ruan Roelofse; Chris Cooprider	Dean O'Brien; Henrique Cunha; Sam Barry; Mikhail Fufygin
July 1	USA F18 Futures; Pittsburgh, USA; Clay $10,000	Michael Shabaz; 5–7, 6–2, 6–4	Jason Tahir	Jeremy Efferding; Shane Vinsant	Connor Smith; Keith-Patrick Crowley; Devin McCarthy; Marcos Giron
July 1	USA F18 Futures; Pittsburgh, USA; Clay $10,000	Marcos Giron; Connor Smith; 6–3, 6–3	Christopher Mengel; Jason Tahir	Jeremy Efferding; Shane Vinsant	Connor Smith; Keith-Patrick Crowley; Devin McCarthy; Marcos Giron
July 8	Argentina F11 Futures; Corrientes, Argentina; Clay $10,000	Andrea Collarini; 6–1, 6–4	Facundo Mena	Juan Pablo Paz; Tomás Lipovšek Puches	Federico Coria; Gonzalo Villanueva; Mateo Nicolás Martínez; Patricio Heras
July 8	Argentina F11 Futures; Corrientes, Argentina; Clay $10,000	Iván Endara; Facundo Mena; 6–3, 6–3	Patricio Heras; Joaquin-Jesús Monteferrario	Juan Pablo Paz; Tomás Lipovšek Puches	Federico Coria; Gonzalo Villanueva; Mateo Nicolás Martínez; Patricio Heras
July 8	Austria F3 Futures; Telfs, Austria; Clay $10,000	Janez Semrajc; 7–5, 6–1	Marc Rath	Nicolas Reissig; Tristan-Samuel Weissborn	Gavin van Peperzeel; Peter Heller; Daniel Lustig; Federico Gaio
July 8	Austria F3 Futures; Telfs, Austria; Clay $10,000	Marc Rath; Bastian Trinker; 7–5, 7–6^{(11–9)}	Lukas Jastraunig; Tristan-Samuel Weissborn	Nicolas Reissig; Tristan-Samuel Weissborn	Gavin van Peperzeel; Peter Heller; Daniel Lustig; Federico Gaio
July 8	Belgium F4 Futures; Knokke, Belgium; Clay $10,000	Joris De Loore; 6–0, 6–2	Julien Cagnina	Niels Desein; Juan Carlos Sáez	Yannick Vandenbulcke; Alexandre Folie; Andrew Harris; Christopher Heyman
July 8	Belgium F4 Futures; Knokke, Belgium; Clay $10,000	Maxime Braeckman; Sander Gillé; 6–2, 5–7, [10–6]	Joris De Loore; Juan Carlos Sáez	Niels Desein; Juan Carlos Sáez	Yannick Vandenbulcke; Alexandre Folie; Andrew Harris; Christopher Heyman
July 8	Bulgaria F7 Futures; Plovdiv, Bulgaria; Clay $10,000	Theodoros Angelinos; 6–4, 4–6, 6–4	Gleb Sakharov	Gibril Diarra; Dino Marcan	Laslo Urrutia Fuentes; Julien Demois; Andrey Rublev; Valentin Dimov
July 8	Bulgaria F7 Futures; Plovdiv, Bulgaria; Clay $10,000	Alexandar Lazov; Laslo Urrutia Fuentes; 4–6, 6–3, [10–8]	Andrey Rublev; Yaraslav Shyla	Gibril Diarra; Dino Marcan	Laslo Urrutia Fuentes; Julien Demois; Andrey Rublev; Valentin Dimov
July 8	Canada F4 Futures; Saskatoon, Canada; Hard $15,000	Austin Krajicek; 7–5, 7–6^{(8–6)}	Tennys Sandgren	Matthew Barton; Benjamin Mitchell	Jonathon Cooper; Nicolas Meister; Filip Peliwo; Brayden Schnur
July 8	Canada F4 Futures; Saskatoon, Canada; Hard $15,000	Austin Krajicek; Tennys Sandgren; 6–4, 3–6, [10–6]	Roman Borvanov; Milan Pokrajac	Matthew Barton; Benjamin Mitchell	Jonathon Cooper; Nicolas Meister; Filip Peliwo; Brayden Schnur
July 8	Czech Republic F4 Futures; Prostějov, Czech Republic; Clay $15,000	Michal Konečný; 7–6^{(7–2)}, 6–4	Kamil Čapkovič	Adam Pavlásek; Alexis Musialek	Marek Semjan; Jan Šátral; Jan Kunčík; Václav Šafránek
July 8	Czech Republic F4 Futures; Prostějov, Czech Republic; Clay $15,000	Michal Konečný; Jaroslav Pospíšil; 6–2, 6–7^{(4–7)}, [10–7]	Jan Kunčík; Robert Rumler	Adam Pavlásek; Alexis Musialek	Marek Semjan; Jan Šátral; Jan Kunčík; Václav Šafránek
July 8	Egypt F15 Futures; Sharm El Sheikh, Egypt; Clay $10,000	Marin Bradarić; 6–1, 6–2	Stanislav Vovk	Issam Haitham Taweel; Luis David Martínez	Ivan Nedelko; Ismar Gorčić; Ramy Kamal Aita; Nerman Fatić
July 8	Egypt F15 Futures; Sharm El Sheikh, Egypt; Clay $10,000	Nerman Fatić; Ismar Gorčić; 6–3, 6–3	Luis David Martínez; Mark Vervoort	Issam Haitham Taweel; Luis David Martínez	Ivan Nedelko; Ismar Gorčić; Ramy Kamal Aita; Nerman Fatić
July 8	France F12 Futures; Bourg-en-Bresse, France; Clay $15,000+H	Yannik Reuter; 6–4, 6–0	Germain Gigounon	Julien Obry; Constant Lestienne	Grégoire Burquier; Benjamin Balleret; Alexander Lobkov; Adrien Puget
July 8	France F12 Futures; Bourg-en-Bresse, France; Clay $15,000+H	Germain Gigounon; Yannik Reuter; 6–4, 3–6, [10–4]	Ariel Behar; Carles Poch Gradin	Julien Obry; Constant Lestienne	Grégoire Burquier; Benjamin Balleret; Alexander Lobkov; Adrien Puget
July 8	Germany F9 Futures; Hanover, Germany; Clay $10,000	Stefan Seifert; 6–4, 7–6^{(7–5)}	Friedrich Klasen	Tim Nekic; Demian Raab	Pablo Galdón; George von Massow; Jaan-Frederik Brunken; Dominik Bartels
July 8	Germany F9 Futures; Hanover, Germany; Clay $10,000	Tom Schönenberg; Torsten Wietoska; 6–1, 6–3	Friedrich Klasen; Stefan Seifert	Tim Nekic; Demian Raab	Pablo Galdón; George von Massow; Jaan-Frederik Brunken; Dominik Bartels
July 8	Great Britain F13 Futures; Ilkley, Great Britain; Hard $10,000	Marcus Daniell; 6–3, 3–6, 6–3	Tom Farquharson	Jonny O'Mara; Antoine Benneteau	Joshua Ward-Hibbert; Marcus Willis; Daniel Cox; Richard Gabb
July 8	Great Britain F13 Futures; Ilkley, Great Britain; Hard $10,000	Marcus Daniell; Richard Gabb; 6–3, 4–6, [10–8]	George Coupland; Joe Salisbury	Jonny O'Mara; Antoine Benneteau	Joshua Ward-Hibbert; Marcus Willis; Daniel Cox; Richard Gabb
July 8	Italy F16 Futures; Sassuolo, Italy; Clay $15,000	Andrea Arnaboldi; 7–6^{(7–0)}, 4–6, 6–2	Walter Trusendi	José Checa Calvo; Enrico Burzi	Filippo Leonardi; Andrea Basso; Marco Crugnola; Alessandro Petrone
July 8	Italy F16 Futures; Sassuolo, Italy; Clay $15,000	Ryan Agar; Sebastian Bader; 6–3, 7–5	Jérôme Inzerillo; Luca Margaroli	José Checa Calvo; Enrico Burzi	Filippo Leonardi; Andrea Basso; Marco Crugnola; Alessandro Petrone
July 8	Romania F7 Futures; Pitești, Romania; Clay $10,000	Kristijan Mesaroš; 6–1, 6–1	Giulio Torroni	Axel Michon; Michael Linzer	Patrick Ciorcilă; Bogdan Ionuț Apostol; Marcel-Ioan Miron; Teodor-Dacian Crăciun
July 8	Romania F7 Futures; Pitești, Romania; Clay $10,000	Claudio Fortuna; Giulio Torroni; 6–3, 6–1	Alexandru-Daniel Carpen; Teodor-Dacian Crăciun	Axel Michon; Michael Linzer	Patrick Ciorcilă; Bogdan Ionuț Apostol; Marcel-Ioan Miron; Teodor-Dacian Crăciun
July 8	Serbia F4 Futures; Belgrade, Serbia; Clay $10,000	Maxime Chazal; 6–4, 6–3	Peđa Krstin	Attila Balázs; Nik Razboršek	Ivan Bjelica; Miki Janković; Marko Djokovic; Carlos Gómez-Herrera
July 8	Serbia F4 Futures; Belgrade, Serbia; Clay $10,000	Marko Djokovic; Matthew Short; 6–4, 6–4	Ivan Bjelica; Matej Sabanov	Attila Balázs; Nik Razboršek	Ivan Bjelica; Miki Janković; Marko Djokovic; Carlos Gómez-Herrera
July 8	Spain F21 Futures; Getxo, Spain; Clay $10,000	Juan Lizariturry; 6–2, 6–3	Andoni Vivanco-Guzmán	Eduard Esteve Lobato; Oriol Roca Batalla	Pol Toledo Bagué; Ivan Gakhov; Laurent Malouli; Edualdo Bonet-de Gispert
July 8	Spain F21 Futures; Getxo, Spain; Clay $10,000	Ivan Gakhov; Miguel Ángel López Jaén; 6–3, 3–6, [13–11]	Eduard Esteve Lobato; David Pérez Sanz	Eduard Esteve Lobato; Oriol Roca Batalla	Pol Toledo Bagué; Ivan Gakhov; Laurent Malouli; Edualdo Bonet-de Gispert
July 8	Turkey F27 Futures; Istanbul, Turkey; Hard $10,000	Henrique Cunha; 2–6, 6–2, 6–4	Enzo Couacaud	Sam Barry; Costin Pavăl	Romain Sichez; Jaime Pulgar-García; Chris Cooprider; Alex Llompart
July 8	Turkey F27 Futures; Istanbul, Turkey; Hard $10,000	Chris Cooprider; Henrique Cunha; 6–3, 6–1	Sefa Suluoğlu; Barkın Yalçınkale	Sam Barry; Costin Pavăl	Romain Sichez; Jaime Pulgar-García; Chris Cooprider; Alex Llompart
July 15	Argentina F12 Futures; Resistencia, Argentina; Clay $10,000	Patricio Heras; 7–6^{(7–2)}, 4–6, 6–3	Martín Cuevas	Tomás Lipovšek Puches; Gabriel Alejandro Hidalgo	Juan Pablo Paz; Federico Coria; Eduardo Agustín Torre; Joaquin-Jesús Monteferrario
July 15	Argentina F12 Futures; Resistencia, Argentina; Clay $10,000	Andrea Collarini; Mateo Nicolás Martínez; 7–6^{(7–2)}, 6–7^{(2–7)}, [10–4]	Gabriel Alejandro Hidalgo; Mauricio Pérez Mota	Tomás Lipovšek Puches; Gabriel Alejandro Hidalgo	Juan Pablo Paz; Federico Coria; Eduardo Agustín Torre; Joaquin-Jesús Monteferrario
July 15	Austria F4 Futures; Kramsach, Austria; Clay $10,000	Janez Semrajc; 7–5, 6–0	Dennis Novak	Alexander Ritschard; Nicolas Reissig	Maverick Banes; Gavin van Peperzeel; Christian Trubrig; Jordan Thompson
July 15	Austria F4 Futures; Kramsach, Austria; Clay $10,000	Lukas Jastraunig; Tristan-Samuel Weissborn; 2–6, 6–4, [10–5]	Or Ram-Harel; Igor Smilansky	Alexander Ritschard; Nicolas Reissig	Maverick Banes; Gavin van Peperzeel; Christian Trubrig; Jordan Thompson
July 15	Belgium F5 Futures; Middelkerke-Westende, Belgium; Clay $15,000+H	Kimmer Coppejans; 6–2, 6–2	Yannik Reuter	Niels Desein; Germain Gigounon	Joran Vliegen; Yannick Vandenbulcke; Matheson Klein; Mauricio Astorga
July 15	Belgium F5 Futures; Middelkerke-Westende, Belgium; Clay $15,000+H	Ruben Gonzales; Darren Walsh; 6–3, 3–6, [10–6]	Alexander Blom; Alban Meuffels	Niels Desein; Germain Gigounon	Joran Vliegen; Yannick Vandenbulcke; Matheson Klein; Mauricio Astorga
July 15	Denmark F1 Futures; Kolding, Denmark; Clay $10,000	Tak Khunn Wang; 3–6, 6–4, 7–6^{(7–4)}	Colin van Beem	Daniel Glancy; Isak Arvidsson	Joachim Bjerke; Maximilian Dinslaken; Mikael Torpegaard; Morgan Johansson
July 15	Denmark F1 Futures; Kolding, Denmark; Clay $10,000	Isak Arvidsson; Milos Sekulic; 6–2, 7–5	Filip Bergevi; Fred Simonsson	Daniel Glancy; Isak Arvidsson	Joachim Bjerke; Maximilian Dinslaken; Mikael Torpegaard; Morgan Johansson
July 15	Egypt F16 Futures; Sharm El Sheikh, Egypt; Clay $10,000	Vladyslav Manafov; 6–4, 6–4	Ramy Kamal Aita	Nerman Fatić; Markos Kalovelonis	Issam Haitham Taweel; Ismar Gorčić; Mazen Osama; Karim Hossam
July 15	Egypt F16 Futures; Sharm El Sheikh, Egypt; Clay $10,000	Nerman Fatić; Ismar Gorčić; 6–3, 6–4	Skander Mansouri; Hassan Ndayishimiye	Nerman Fatić; Markos Kalovelonis	Issam Haitham Taweel; Ismar Gorčić; Mazen Osama; Karim Hossam
July 15	Estonia F1 Futures; Tallinn, Estonia; Clay $15,000	Lucas Pouille; 6–2, 6–1	Ivan Nedelko	Vladimir Ivanov; Axel Michon	Jürgen Zopp; Henrik Sillanpää; Adria Mas Mascolo; Micke Kontinen
July 15	Estonia F1 Futures; Tallinn, Estonia; Clay $15,000	Markus Kerner; Miķelis Lībietis; 6–1, 7–5	Micke Kontinen; Wesley Koolhof	Vladimir Ivanov; Axel Michon	Jürgen Zopp; Henrik Sillanpää; Adria Mas Mascolo; Micke Kontinen
July 15	France F13 Futures; Saint-Gervais, France; Clay $15,000	Hugo Dellien; 6–4, 5–7, 6–3	Johan Sébastien Tatlot	Michael Bois; Yann Marti	Quentin Halys; Medy Chettar; Maxime Chazal; Simon Cauvard
July 15	France F13 Futures; Saint-Gervais, France; Clay $15,000	Hugo Dellien; Federico Zeballos; 6–4, 2–6, [11–9]	Kevin Botti; Simon Cauvard	Michael Bois; Yann Marti	Quentin Halys; Medy Chettar; Maxime Chazal; Simon Cauvard
July 15	Germany F10 Futures; Trier, Germany; Clay $10,000	Yannick Mertens; 6–4, 6–2	Petar Trendafilov	Tihomir Grozdanov; Kevin Kaczynski	Matthias Wunner; Caio Zampieri; Vincent Thierry Schneider; Ivo Mijic
July 15	Germany F10 Futures; Trier, Germany; Clay $10,000	David Škoch; Jan Zedník; 6–2, 7–6^{(7–4)}	Gustavo Gómez Buyatti; Kirill Nasonov	Tihomir Grozdanov; Kevin Kaczynski	Matthias Wunner; Caio Zampieri; Vincent Thierry Schneider; Ivo Mijic
July 15	Great Britain F14 Futures; Felixstowe, Great Britain; Hard $10,000	Marcus Willis; 6–2, 6–4	Neil Pauffley	Liam Broady; Stefano Napolitano	Antoine Benneteau; Daniel Cox; Richard Bloomfield; Marcus Daniell
July 15	Great Britain F14 Futures; Felixstowe, Great Britain; Hard $10,000	Marcus Daniell; Richard Gabb; 7–6^{(9–7)}, 6–4	Robin Goodman; Euan McIntosh	Liam Broady; Stefano Napolitano	Antoine Benneteau; Daniel Cox; Richard Bloomfield; Marcus Daniell
July 15	Italy F17 Futures; Modena, Italy; Clay $15,000	Marco Cecchinato; 6–3, 6–4	Dominic Thiem	Claudio Fortuna; Maxime Teixeira	Ivo Klec; Riccardo Sinicropi; Enrico Burzi; Daniele Giorgini
July 15	Italy F17 Futures; Modena, Italy; Clay $15,000	Omar Giacalone; Daniele Giorgini; 4–6, 7–6^{(7–5)}, [10–7]	Marco Cecchinato; Matteo Fago	Claudio Fortuna; Maxime Teixeira	Ivo Klec; Riccardo Sinicropi; Enrico Burzi; Daniele Giorgini
July 15	Serbia F5 Futures; Belgrade, Serbia; Clay $10,000	Attila Balázs; 6–4, 6–0	Cristóbal Saavedra Corvalán	Stepan Khotulev; Michael Linzer	Arsenije Zlatanović; Laslo Djere; Gleb Sakharov; Denis Bejtulahi
July 15	Serbia F5 Futures; Belgrade, Serbia; Clay $10,000	Djordje Djokovic; Matthew Short; 7–5, 6–3	Ivan Sabanov; Matej Sabanov	Stepan Khotulev; Michael Linzer	Arsenije Zlatanović; Laslo Djere; Gleb Sakharov; Denis Bejtulahi
July 15	Slovakia F1 Futures; Tatranská Lomnica, Slovakia; Clay $10,000	Błażej Koniusz; 6–3, 7–5	Martin Fafl	Samuel Bensoussan; Robin Staněk	Dominik Süč; Michal Pažický; Adrian Partl; Kamil Čapkovič
July 15	Slovakia F1 Futures; Tatranská Lomnica, Slovakia; Clay $10,000	Pirmin Hänle; Błażej Koniusz; 2–6, 6–3, [10–5]	Lukáš Maršoun; Dominik Süč	Samuel Bensoussan; Robin Staněk	Dominik Süč; Michal Pažický; Adrian Partl; Kamil Čapkovič
July 15	Spain F22 Futures; Gandia, Spain; Clay $10,000	Ricardo Rodríguez; 6–4, 6–3	Alexander Lobkov	David Vega Hernández; Marc Giner	David Estruch; Hasier Pastor; Juan Lizariturry; Ricardo Ojeda Lara
July 15	Spain F22 Futures; Gandia, Spain; Clay $10,000	João Domingues; André Gaspar Murta; 6–4, 6–4	Luis Fernando Ramírez; David Souto	David Vega Hernández; Marc Giner	David Estruch; Hasier Pastor; Juan Lizariturry; Ricardo Ojeda Lara
July 15	Turkey F28 Futures; Istanbul, Turkey; Hard $10,000	Enzo Couacaud; 6–4, 6–1	Bar Tzuf Botzer	Riccardo Ghedin; Laurent Malouli	Robert Coman; Aleksandre Metreveli; Matthieu Roy; Torsten Wietoska
July 15	Turkey F28 Futures; Istanbul, Turkey; Hard $10,000	Alex Llompart; Finn Tearney; 6–2, 2–6, [10–2]	Tuna Altuna; Costin Pavăl	Riccardo Ghedin; Laurent Malouli	Robert Coman; Aleksandre Metreveli; Matthieu Roy; Torsten Wietoska
July 15	USA F19 Futures; Joplin, USA; Hard $10,000	Darian King; 6–3, 7–6^{(7–3)}	Alexander Sarkissian	Alex Blumenberg; Daniel Garza	Sahak Bazrganian; Nick Chappell; Michael Shabaz; Jacob Coenraad de Klerk
July 15	USA F19 Futures; Joplin, USA; Hard $10,000	Daniel Garza; Roberto Maytín; 6–1, 6–2	Dekel Bar; Leon Frost	Alex Blumenberg; Daniel Garza	Sahak Bazrganian; Nick Chappell; Michael Shabaz; Jacob Coenraad de Klerk
July 22	Argentina F13 Futures; Misiones, Argentina; Clay $10,000	Andrea Collarini; 6–4, 4–6, 7–5	Patricio Heras	Federico Coria; Gabriel Alejandro Hidalgo	Facundo Mena; Mateo Facundo Cressa; Martín Cuevas; Tomás Buchhass
July 22	Argentina F13 Futures; Misiones, Argentina; Clay $10,000	Martín Cuevas; Mateo Nicolás Martínez; 4–6, 6–4, [10–8]	Patricio Heras; Joaquin-Jesús Monteferrario	Federico Coria; Gabriel Alejandro Hidalgo	Facundo Mena; Mateo Facundo Cressa; Martín Cuevas; Tomás Buchhass
July 22	Austria F5 Futures; Bad Waltersdorf, Austria; Clay $10,000	Jordan Thompson; 1–6, 6–4, 6–0	Patrick Ofner	Nikolaus Moser; Mario Haider-Maurer	Gibril Diarra; Maverick Banes; Nikola Ćaćić; Jakub Filipský
July 22	Austria F5 Futures; Bad Waltersdorf, Austria; Clay $10,000	Philip Lang; Richard Ruckelshausen; 7–6^{(7–5)}, 6–3	Patrick Ofner; Sebastian Ofner	Nikolaus Moser; Mario Haider-Maurer	Gibril Diarra; Maverick Banes; Nikola Ćaćić; Jakub Filipský
July 22	Belgium F6 Futures; Heist, Belgium; Clay $10,000	Kimmer Coppejans; 7–6^{(7–3)}, 4–6, 6–1	Julien Cagnina	Dimitar Grabul; Joris De Loore	Eduardo Peralta-Tello; Marcos Giraldi Requena; Yannick Vandenbulcke; Scott Griekspoor
July 22	Belgium F6 Futures; Heist, Belgium; Clay $10,000	Cedric De Zutter; Joran Vliegen; 7–5, 6–2	Bobbie de Goeijen; Scott Griekspoor	Dimitar Grabul; Joris De Loore	Eduardo Peralta-Tello; Marcos Giraldi Requena; Yannick Vandenbulcke; Scott Griekspoor
July 22	Brazil F1 Futures; São Paulo, Brazil; Clay $10,000	Ricardo Hocevar; 6–3, 7–6^{(7–4)}	Daniel Dutra da Silva	Tiago Lopes; Bruno Sant'Anna	João Pedro Sorgi; Eduardo Dischinger; Rafael Camilo; Alexandre Tsuchiya
July 22	Brazil F1 Futures; São Paulo, Brazil; Clay $10,000	Marcos Vinicius da Silva Dias; Rodrigo-Antonio Grilli; 6–1, 6–2	Daniel Dutra da Silva; Caio Silva	Tiago Lopes; Bruno Sant'Anna	João Pedro Sorgi; Eduardo Dischinger; Rafael Camilo; Alexandre Tsuchiya
July 22	Denmark F2 Futures; Aarhus, Denmark; Clay $10,000	Prajnesh Gunneswaran; 6–3, 4–6, 6–0	Colin van Beem	Fred Simonsson; Lloyd Glasspool	Tak Khunn Wang; George von Massow; Anders Arenfeldt Holm; Joachim Bjerke
July 22	Denmark F2 Futures; Aarhus, Denmark; Clay $10,000	Esben Hess-Olesen; Oystein Steiro; 6–0, 6–1	Isak Arvidsson; Milos Sekulic	Fred Simonsson; Lloyd Glasspool	Tak Khunn Wang; George von Massow; Anders Arenfeldt Holm; Joachim Bjerke
July 22	Egypt F17 Futures; Sharm El Sheikh, Egypt; Clay $10,000	Karim Hossam; 6–4, 6–4	Marc Abdelnour	Vladyslav Manafov; Issam Haitham Taweel	Vignesh Peranamallur; Mark Fynn; Antoine Richard; Luis David Martínez
July 22	Egypt F17 Futures; Sharm El Sheikh, Egypt; Clay $10,000	Dmytro Kovalyov; Denys Mylokostov; 7–6^{(7–3)}, 3–6, [10–3]	Vladyslav Manafov; Ilia Shatskiy	Vladyslav Manafov; Issam Haitham Taweel	Vignesh Peranamallur; Mark Fynn; Antoine Richard; Luis David Martínez
July 22	Estonia F2 Futures; Kuressaare, Estonia; Clay $10,000	Miķelis Lībietis; 6–7^{(2–7)}, 7–6^{(7–3)}, 7–6^{(9–7)}	Vladimir Ivanov	Wesley Koolhof; Mathias Bourgue	Giorgio Portaluri; Vladimir Polyakov; Alexander Zhurbin; Giammarco Micolani
July 22	Estonia F2 Futures; Kuressaare, Estonia; Clay $10,000	Giammarco Micolani; Giorgio Portaluri; 6–3, 6–3	Patrik Brydolf; Vladzimir Kruk	Wesley Koolhof; Mathias Bourgue	Giorgio Portaluri; Vladimir Polyakov; Alexander Zhurbin; Giammarco Micolani
July 22	Germany F11 Futures; Dortmund, Germany; Clay $10,000	Oscar Otte; 6–1, 6–4	Ivo Mijic	Andreas Mies; Ricardo Urzúa-Rivera	Marvin Netuschil; Kevin Kaczynski; Daniel Masur; Phillip-Arthur Karwasz
July 22	Germany F11 Futures; Dortmund, Germany; Clay $10,000	Andreas Mies; Oscar Otte; 7–5, 6–1	Mats Moraing; Tom Schönenberg	Andreas Mies; Ricardo Urzúa-Rivera	Marvin Netuschil; Kevin Kaczynski; Daniel Masur; Phillip-Arthur Karwasz
July 22	Ireland F1 Futures; Dublin, Ireland; Carpet $15,000	Daniel Cox; 6–3, 6–3	Albano Olivetti	Sam Barry; Tom Farquharson	Marcus Daniell; Maxime Tchoutakian; Daniel Glancy; Richard Gabb
July 22	Ireland F1 Futures; Dublin, Ireland; Carpet $15,000	John Morrissey; Colin O'Brien; 6–4, 6–7^{(1–7)}, [10–7]	Marcus Daniell; Richard Gabb	Sam Barry; Tom Farquharson	Marcus Daniell; Maxime Tchoutakian; Daniel Glancy; Richard Gabb
July 22	Italy F18 Futures; Fano, Italy; Clay $15,000+H	Roman Jebavý; 6–3, 4–6, 7–5	Claudio Fortuna	Lamine Ouahab; Salvatore Caruso	Marc Rath; Federico Gaio; Omar Giacalone; Stefano Travaglia
July 22	Italy F18 Futures; Fano, Italy; Clay $15,000+H	Francesco Borgo; Marco Bortolotti; 7–6^{(8–6)}, 7–5	Riccardo Bonadio; Pietro Rondoni	Lamine Ouahab; Salvatore Caruso	Marc Rath; Federico Gaio; Omar Giacalone; Stefano Travaglia
July 22	Serbia F6 Futures; Kikinda, Serbia; Clay $10,000	Laslo Djere; 6–2, 6–1	Teodor-Dacian Crăciun	Saša Stojisavljević; Ilija Vučić	Peđa Krstin; Marko Tepavac; Viktor Filipenkó; Miki Janković
July 22	Serbia F6 Futures; Kikinda, Serbia; Clay $10,000	Dinko Halachev; Gleb Sakharov; 6–2, 3–6, [12–10]	Alexandru-Daniel Carpen; Tudor Cristian Șulea	Saša Stojisavljević; Ilija Vučić	Peđa Krstin; Marko Tepavac; Viktor Filipenkó; Miki Janković
July 22	Slovakia F2 Futures; Michalovce, Slovakia; Clay $10,000	Kamil Čapkovič; 6–4, 3–6, 6–3	Juraj Masár	Jan Blecha; Danylo Kalenichenko	Adrian Partl; Matúš Mydla; Robert Januch; Filip Horanský
July 22	Slovakia F2 Futures; Michalovce, Slovakia; Clay $10,000	Lukáš Maršoun; Dominik Süč; 6–0, 7–6^{(7–3)}	Pirmin Hänle; Michal Pažický	Jan Blecha; Danylo Kalenichenko	Adrian Partl; Matúš Mydla; Robert Januch; Filip Horanský
July 22	Spain F23 Futures; Dénia, Spain; Clay $10,000	David Vega Hernández; 6–4, 6–3	Alexander Rumyantsev	Juan-Samuel Arauzo-Martínez; Juan Lizariturry	Ricardo Ojeda Lara; David Pérez Sanz; Miguel Ángel López Jaén; Ricardo Rodríguez
July 22	Spain F23 Futures; Dénia, Spain; Clay $10,000	Juan Lizariturry; David Vega Hernández; 6–3, 0–6, [10–8]	Ricardo Ojeda Lara; Oriol Roca Batalla	Juan-Samuel Arauzo-Martínez; Juan Lizariturry	Ricardo Ojeda Lara; David Pérez Sanz; Miguel Ángel López Jaén; Ricardo Rodríguez
July 22	Turkey F29 Futures; Istanbul, Turkey; Hard $10,000	Daniiar Duldaev; 1–6, 7–6^{(7–5)}, 6–4	Tuna Altuna	Rudy Coco; Costin Pavăl	Laurent Malouli; Alex Llompart; Torsten Wietoska; Matthieu Roy
July 22	Turkey F29 Futures; Istanbul, Turkey; Hard $10,000	Alex Llompart; Finn Tearney; 6–4, 6–1	Tuna Altuna; Barış Ergüden	Rudy Coco; Costin Pavăl	Laurent Malouli; Alex Llompart; Torsten Wietoska; Matthieu Roy
July 22	USA F20 Futures; Godfrey, USA; Hard $10,000	Michael Shabaz; 6–3, 7–5	Noah Rubin	Darian King; Evan King	Ronnie Schneider; Evan Song; Devin McCarthy; Jeremy Efferding
July 22	USA F20 Futures; Godfrey, USA; Hard $10,000	Evan King; Peter Kobelt; 7–5, 6–2	Marcos Giron; Devin McCarthy	Darian King; Evan King	Ronnie Schneider; Evan Song; Devin McCarthy; Jeremy Efferding
July 29	Belgium F7 Futures; Oostende, Belgium; Clay $10,000	Kimmer Coppejans; 6–7^{(6–8)}, 6–1, 6–2	Yannick Mertens	Niels Desein; Juan Carlos Sáez	Alexandre Folie; Julien Dubail; Romain Bogaerts; Marcos Giraldi Requena
July 29	Belgium F7 Futures; Oostende, Belgium; Clay $10,000	Kimmer Coppejans; Niels Desein; 6–2, 6–3	Sander Gillé; Roger Ordeig	Niels Desein; Juan Carlos Sáez	Alexandre Folie; Julien Dubail; Romain Bogaerts; Marcos Giraldi Requena
July 29	Brazil F3 Futures; Porto Velho, Brazil; Hard $15,000	José Pereira; 6–3, 6–1	Thales Turini	Pedro Sakamoto; Eduardo Dischinger	Caio Silva; Augusto Laranja; Gabriel Friedrich; Fabrício Neis
July 29	Brazil F3 Futures; Porto Velho, Brazil; Hard $15,000	José Pereira; Alexandre Tsuchiya; 7–6^{(7–5)}, 6–2	Fabrício Neis; Nicolas Santos	Pedro Sakamoto; Eduardo Dischinger	Caio Silva; Augusto Laranja; Gabriel Friedrich; Fabrício Neis
July 29	Denmark F3 Futures; Copenhagen, Denmark; Clay $10,000	Markus Eriksson; 6–4, 7–5	Martin Pedersen	Patrik Rosenholm; Florian Barth	Mikael Torpegaard; Jordan Thompson; Filip Bergevi; Maxime Chazal
July 29	Denmark F3 Futures; Copenhagen, Denmark; Clay $10,000	Isak Arvidsson; Milos Sekulic; 6–4, 1–6, [10–8]	Patrik Rosenholm; Davy Sum	Patrik Rosenholm; Florian Barth	Mikael Torpegaard; Jordan Thompson; Filip Bergevi; Maxime Chazal
July 29	Egypt F18 Futures; Sharm El Sheikh, Egypt; Clay $10,000	Cristóbal Saavedra Corvalán; 6–3, 6–0	Mazen Osama	Edoardo Eremin; Karim Hossam	Denys Mylokostov; Damiano Di Ienno; Lorenzo Papasidero; Vladyslav Manafov
July 29	Egypt F18 Futures; Sharm El Sheikh, Egypt; Clay $10,000	Dmytro Kovalyov; Denys Mylokostov; 7–5, 4–6, [10–4]	Matías Castro; Mark Fynn	Edoardo Eremin; Karim Hossam	Denys Mylokostov; Damiano Di Ienno; Lorenzo Papasidero; Vladyslav Manafov
July 29	Germany F12 Futures; Wetzlar, Germany; Clay $10,000	Bastian Knittel; 6–2, 3–6, 6–3	Julian Lenz	Ivo Mijic; Julien Demois	Nicolás Kicker; David Thurner; Tom Schönenberg; Constant Lestienne
July 29	Germany F12 Futures; Wetzlar, Germany; Clay $10,000	Wesley Koolhof; Rogier Wassen; 3–6, 6–0, [10–7]	Julian Lenz; Lars Pörschke	Ivo Mijic; Julien Demois	Nicolás Kicker; David Thurner; Tom Schönenberg; Constant Lestienne
July 29	Great Britain F15 Futures; Nottingham, Great Britain; Hard $15,000	Daniel Cox; 6–4, 3–6, 6–1	Ashley Hewitt	Daniel Smethurst; Richard Gabb	Hugo Nys; Neil Pauffley; Marcus Willis; Liam Broady
July 29	Great Britain F15 Futures; Nottingham, Great Britain; Hard $15,000	Liam Broady; Joshua Ward-Hibbert; 4–6, 6–3, [10–6]	Scott Clayton; Toby Martin	Daniel Smethurst; Richard Gabb	Hugo Nys; Neil Pauffley; Marcus Willis; Liam Broady
July 29	Italy F19 Futures; La Spezia, Italy; Clay $15,000	Alessandro Giannessi; 6–2, 6–3	Daniele Giorgini	Walter Trusendi; Alberto Brizzi	Matteo Trevisan; Stefano Travaglia; Gianluca Mager; Roberto Marcora
July 29	Italy F19 Futures; La Spezia, Italy; Clay $15,000	Daniele Giorgini; Walter Trusendi; 7–5, 6–2	Alessandro Bega; Riccardo Sinicropi	Walter Trusendi; Alberto Brizzi	Matteo Trevisan; Stefano Travaglia; Gianluca Mager; Roberto Marcora
July 29	Lithuania F1 Futures; Vilnius, Lithuania; Clay $10,000	Laurynas Grigelis; 6–1, 6–3	Giammarco Micolani	Hans Podlipnik Castillo; Miķelis Lībietis	Lukas Mugevičius; Alexander Zhurbin; Laurent Malouli; Vladimir Ivanov
July 29	Lithuania F1 Futures; Vilnius, Lithuania; Clay $10,000	Laurynas Grigelis; Giuseppe Menga; 7–5, 6–3	Ivan Anikanov; Yaraslav Shyla	Hans Podlipnik Castillo; Miķelis Lībietis	Lukas Mugevičius; Alexander Zhurbin; Laurent Malouli; Vladimir Ivanov
July 29	Poland F1 Futures; Ślęza, Poland; Hard $10,000	Stefan Seifert; 3–6, 7–6^{(8–6)}, 6–4	Piotr Gadomski	Denis Matsukevich; Roman Jebavý	Filip Brtnický; Petr Michnev; Robert Rumler; David Pel
July 29	Poland F1 Futures; Ślęza, Poland; Hard $10,000	Stefan Seifert; Torsten Wietoska; 6–4, 6–7^{(4–7)}, [10–6]	Jeroen Benard; David Pel	Denis Matsukevich; Roman Jebavý	Filip Brtnický; Petr Michnev; Robert Rumler; David Pel
July 29	Russia F9 Futures; Balashiha, Russia; Clay $15,000	Valery Rudnev; 6–3, 6–3	Victor Baluda	Vladimir Polyakov; Mikhail Biryukov	Aleksandr Vasilenko; Anton Galkin; Gleb Alekseenko; Alexey Nikiforov
July 29	Russia F9 Futures; Balashiha, Russia; Clay $15,000	Alexandre Krasnoroutskiy; Anton Manegin; 6–3, 6–4	Victor Baluda; Alexander Rumyantsev	Vladimir Polyakov; Mikhail Biryukov	Aleksandr Vasilenko; Anton Galkin; Gleb Alekseenko; Alexey Nikiforov
July 29	Serbia F7 Futures; Sombor, Serbia; Clay $10,000	Gergely Madarász; 6–3, 5–7, 7–5	Dejan Katić	Tomislav Jotovski; Marko Tepavac	Matej Sabanov; Gleb Sakharov; Duje Kekez; Denis Bejtulahi
July 29	Serbia F7 Futures; Sombor, Serbia; Clay $10,000	Ivan Sabanov; Matej Sabanov; 4–6, 7–5, [10–5]	Dinko Halachev; Gleb Sakharov	Tomislav Jotovski; Marko Tepavac	Matej Sabanov; Gleb Sakharov; Duje Kekez; Denis Bejtulahi
July 29	Slovakia F3 Futures; Piešťany, Slovakia; Clay $10,000	Jan Šátral; 6–1, 6–0	Marco Bortolotti	Toni Androić; Jan Blecha	Michal Pažický; Václav Šafránek; Juraj Masár; Kamil Čapkovič
July 29	Slovakia F3 Futures; Piešťany, Slovakia; Clay $10,000	Toni Androić; Marco Bortolotti; 6–3, 3–2 ret.	Patrik Fabian; Adrian Partl	Toni Androić; Jan Blecha	Michal Pažický; Václav Šafránek; Juraj Masár; Kamil Čapkovič
July 29	Spain F24 Futures; Xàtiva, Spain; Clay $10,000	Jordi Samper Montaña; 6–3, 6–4	David Souto	Oriol Roca Batalla; Marc Giner	David Vega Hernández; Ricardo Rodríguez; Stanislav Poplavskyy; Eduard Esteve Lobato
July 29	Spain F24 Futures; Xàtiva, Spain; Clay $10,000	Ivan Gakhov; Miguel Ángel López Jaén; 6–2, 7–6^{(7–1)}	Luis Fernando Ramírez; David Souto	Oriol Roca Batalla; Marc Giner	David Vega Hernández; Ricardo Rodríguez; Stanislav Poplavskyy; Eduard Esteve Lobato
July 29	Turkey F30 Futures; Istanbul, Turkey; Hard $10,000	Tuna Altuna; 7–6^{(7–2)}, 6–1	Claudio Grassi	Kittiphong Wachiramanowong; Marat Deviatiarov	Daniiar Duldaev; Lorenzo Frigerio; Costin Pavăl; Dane Propoggia
July 29	Turkey F30 Futures; Istanbul, Turkey; Hard $10,000	Brydan Klein; Dane Propoggia; 6–1, 6–4	Tuna Altuna; Barış Ergüden	Kittiphong Wachiramanowong; Marat Deviatiarov	Daniiar Duldaev; Lorenzo Frigerio; Costin Pavăl; Dane Propoggia
July 29	USA F21 Futures; Decatur, USA; Hard $10,000	Eric Quigley; 7–6^{(7–3)}, 6–4	Dimitar Kutrovsky	Oleg Dmitriev; Vijayant Malik	Cătălin-Ionuț Gârd; Dane Webb; Ruan Roelofse; Becker O'Shaughnessey
July 29	USA F21 Futures; Decatur, USA; Hard $10,000	Becker O'Shaughnessey; Daniil Proskura; 6–3, 6–1	Pavel Krainik; Alejandro Moreno Figueroa	Oleg Dmitriev; Vijayant Malik	Cătălin-Ionuț Gârd; Dane Webb; Ruan Roelofse; Becker O'Shaughnessey

=== August ===
Week of	Tournament	Winner	Runners-up	Semifinalists	Quarterfinalists
August 5	Austria F6 Futures; Wels, Austria; Clay $10,000	Dennis Novak; 6–2, 6–7^{(2–7)}, 7–6^{(7–1)}	Oliver Golding	Michael Linzer; Nicolas Reissig	Mario Haider-Maurer; Robin Kern; Maxi Pongratz; Jordan Thompson
August 5	Austria F6 Futures; Wels, Austria; Clay $10,000	Pascal Brunner; Dennis Novak; 6–1, 6–1	Patrick Ofner; Sebastian Stiefelmeyer	Michael Linzer; Nicolas Reissig	Mario Haider-Maurer; Robin Kern; Maxi Pongratz; Jordan Thompson
August 5	Belgium F8 Futures; Eupen, Belgium; Clay $10,000	Dimitar Grabul; 0–6, 6–1, 6–3	Constant Lestienne	Ivo Mijic; Julien Cagnina	Tom Schönenberg; Sander Gillé; Antoine Hoang; Alexey Vatutin
August 5	Belgium F8 Futures; Eupen, Belgium; Clay $10,000	Sander Gillé; Joran Vliegen; 6–3, 6–3	Gustavo Gómez Buyatti; Antoine Hoang	Ivo Mijic; Julien Cagnina	Tom Schönenberg; Sander Gillé; Antoine Hoang; Alexey Vatutin
August 5	Brazil F4 Futures; Manaus, Brazil; Clay $15,000+H	Pedro Sakamoto; 7–6^{(7–4)}, 7–5	Fernando Romboli	José Hernández; André Miele	Charles Costa; Fabrício Neis; Caio Silva; José Pereira
August 5	Brazil F4 Futures; Manaus, Brazil; Clay $15,000+H	José Hernández; José Pereira; 6–1, 6–1	Victor Maynard; Rafael Rondino	José Hernández; André Miele	Charles Costa; Fabrício Neis; Caio Silva; José Pereira
August 5	China F6 Futures; Zhangjiagang, China; Hard $15,000	Huang Liang-chi; 6–3, 6–2	Lim Yong-kyu	Toshihide Matsui; Shuichi Sekiguchi	Liu Siyu; Wang Chieh-fu; Na Jung-woong; Hung Jui-chen
August 5	China F6 Futures; Zhangjiagang, China; Hard $15,000	N. Sriram Balaji; Ranjeet Virali-Murugesan; 7–5, 7–6^{(7–4)}	Lim Yong-kyu; Toshihide Matsui	Toshihide Matsui; Shuichi Sekiguchi	Liu Siyu; Wang Chieh-fu; Na Jung-woong; Hung Jui-chen
August 5	Colombia F3 Futures; Medellín, Colombia; Clay $15,000	Víctor Estrella; 6–4, 0–6, 6–3	Mauricio Echazú	Eduardo Struvay; Felipe Escobar	Christopher Díaz Figueroa; Michael Quintero; Sebastián López; Patricio Heras
August 5	Colombia F3 Futures; Medellín, Colombia; Clay $15,000	Mauricio Echazú; Patricio Heras; 6–3, 1–6, [14–12]	Felipe Mantilla; Eduardo Struvay	Eduardo Struvay; Felipe Escobar	Christopher Díaz Figueroa; Michael Quintero; Sebastián López; Patricio Heras
August 5	Egypt F19 Futures; Sharm El Sheikh, Egypt; Clay $10,000	Alberto Brizzi; 6–0, 6–2	Alessandro Petrone	Edoardo Eremin; Mazen Osama	Sebastián Rivera; Lorenzo Papasidero; Ramy Kamal Aita; Ugo Nastasi
August 5	Egypt F19 Futures; Sharm El Sheikh, Egypt; Clay $10,000	Mauricio Álvarez-Guzmán; Cristóbal Saavedra Corvalán; 6–2, 6–2	Oleg Dovgan; Mikhail Korovin	Edoardo Eremin; Mazen Osama	Sebastián Rivera; Lorenzo Papasidero; Ramy Kamal Aita; Ugo Nastasi
August 5	Finland F1 Futures; Vierumäki, Finland; Clay $10,000	Tak Khunn Wang; 6–4, 6–3	Laurent Lokoli	Micke Kontinen; Vladimir Ivanov	Florian Barth; Maxime Chazal; Henrik Sillanpää; Kevin Griekspoor
August 5	Finland F1 Futures; Vierumäki, Finland; Clay $10,000	Micke Kontinen; Tak Khunn Wang; 6–2, 6–3	Vladimir Ivanov; Yan Sabanin	Micke Kontinen; Vladimir Ivanov	Florian Barth; Maxime Chazal; Henrik Sillanpää; Kevin Griekspoor
August 5	Germany F13 Futures; Friedberg, Germany; Clay $10,000	Steven Moneke; 2–6, 6–1, 6–4	Yannick Maden	Caio Zampieri; Kevin Krawietz	Bastian Trinker; Pablo Galdón; Dominik Schulz; Lukas Finzelberg
August 5	Germany F13 Futures; Friedberg, Germany; Clay $10,000	Moritz Dettinger; Yannick Maden; 7–6^{(9–7)}, 7–5	Daniel Baumann; Michael Feucht	Caio Zampieri; Kevin Krawietz	Bastian Trinker; Pablo Galdón; Dominik Schulz; Lukas Finzelberg
August 5	Great Britain F16 Futures; Chiswick, Great Britain; Hard $15,000	Boy Westerhof; 7–6^{(8–6)}, 6–2	Daniel Cox	Josh Goodall; Jules Marie	David Rice; Daniel Smethurst; Joshua Ward-Hibbert; Liam Broady
August 5	Great Britain F16 Futures; Chiswick, Great Britain; Hard $15,000	Liam Broady; Joshua Ward-Hibbert; 7–6^{(7–5)}, 2–6, [10–6]	David Rice; Sean Thornley	Josh Goodall; Jules Marie	David Rice; Daniel Smethurst; Joshua Ward-Hibbert; Liam Broady
August 5	Italy F20 Futures; Bolzano, Italy; Clay $15,000	Kyle Edmund; 6–3, 6–2	Gianluca Naso	Marc Rath; Antal van der Duim	Simone Vagnozzi; Marco Bortolotti; Alexis Musialek; Jordi Samper Montaña
August 5	Italy F20 Futures; Bolzano, Italy; Clay $15,000	Marc Rath; Antal van der Duim; 6–4, 7–5	Thomas Holzer; Patrick Prader	Marc Rath; Antal van der Duim	Simone Vagnozzi; Marco Bortolotti; Alexis Musialek; Jordi Samper Montaña
August 5	Latvia F1 Futures; Jūrmala, Latvia; Clay $10,000	Hans Podlipnik Castillo; 6–4, 6–4	Giammarco Micolani	Stanislav Vovk; Miķelis Lībietis	Louk Sorensen; Mārcis Garuts; Julius Tverijonas; Mark Vervoort
August 5	Latvia F1 Futures; Jūrmala, Latvia; Clay $10,000	Miķelis Lībietis; Oskars Vaskis; 6–7^{(3–7)}, 6–3, [12–10]	Kirill Dmitriev; Luca Margaroli	Stanislav Vovk; Miķelis Lībietis	Louk Sorensen; Mārcis Garuts; Julius Tverijonas; Mark Vervoort
August 5	Poland F2 Futures; Olsztyn, Poland; Clay $10,000	Adam Pavlásek; 6–2, 5–7, 7–6^{(7–5)}	Benjamin Balleret	Piotr Gadomski; Romain Arneodo	Piotr Łomacki; Arkadiusz Kocyła; Błażej Koniusz; Andriej Kapaś
August 5	Poland F2 Futures; Olsztyn, Poland; Clay $10,000	Benjamin Balleret; Piotr Gadomski; 6–2, 7–5	Aliaksandr Bury; Vladzimir Kruk	Piotr Gadomski; Romain Arneodo	Piotr Łomacki; Arkadiusz Kocyła; Błażej Koniusz; Andriej Kapaś
August 5	Russia F10 Futures; Lermontov, Russia; Clay $15,000	Alexander Rumyantsev; 7–6^{(7–2)}, 6–3	Michal Schmid	Valery Rudnev; Mikhail Biryukov	Kristijan Mesaroš; Ilia Shatskiy; Alexandr Kushakov; Vitaliy Kachanovskiy
August 5	Russia F10 Futures; Lermontov, Russia; Clay $15,000	Kristijan Mesaroš; Michal Schmid; 6–1, 7–6^{(7–4)}	Alexander Igoshin; Vitaliy Kachanovskiy	Valery Rudnev; Mikhail Biryukov	Kristijan Mesaroš; Ilia Shatskiy; Alexandr Kushakov; Vitaliy Kachanovskiy
August 5	Serbia F8 Futures; Novi Sad, Serbia; Clay $10,000	Carlos Gómez-Herrera; 6–0, 6–1	Cedrick Commin	Dimitar Kuzmanov; Matthew Short	Matteo Fago; Denis Bejtulahi; Gleb Sakharov; Ismar Gorčić
August 5	Serbia F8 Futures; Novi Sad, Serbia; Clay $10,000	Tomislav Brkić; Duje Kekez; 6–3, 7–6^{(7–1)}	Ismar Gorčić; Ilija Vučić	Dimitar Kuzmanov; Matthew Short	Matteo Fago; Denis Bejtulahi; Gleb Sakharov; Ismar Gorčić
August 5	Slovakia F4 Futures; Trnava, Slovakia; Clay $10,000	Kamil Čapkovič; 7–6^{(9–7)}, 7–5	Adrian Sikora	Miloslav Mečíř; Filip Horanský	Juraj Masár; Lubomír Majšajdr; Marek Michalička; Marek Semjan
August 5	Slovakia F4 Futures; Trnava, Slovakia; Clay $10,000	Lukáš Maršoun; Dominik Süč; 6–2, 6–0	Jan Kunčík; Marek Michalička	Miloslav Mečíř; Filip Horanský	Juraj Masár; Lubomír Majšajdr; Marek Michalička; Marek Semjan
August 5	Spain F25 Futures; Béjar, Spain; Hard $10,000	José Checa Calvo; 4–0 Ret.	Andrés Artuñedo	Ricardo Villacorta-Alonso; Andoni Vivanco-Guzmán	Gonçalo Pereira; David Pérez Sanz; Federico Zeballos; Adam Sanjurjo Hermida
August 5	Spain F25 Futures; Béjar, Spain; Hard $10,000	José Checa Calvo; Andoni Vivanco-Guzmán; 6–4, 6–2	Daniel Casablancas; David Jordà Sanchis	Ricardo Villacorta-Alonso; Andoni Vivanco-Guzmán	Gonçalo Pereira; David Pérez Sanz; Federico Zeballos; Adam Sanjurjo Hermida
August 5	Turkey F31 Futures; İzmir, Turkey; Hard $10,000	Marsel İlhan; 6–2, 6–4	Dane Propoggia	Brydan Klein; Tucker Vorster	Denis Yevseyev; David Pel; Andrew Whittington; Maximiliano Estévez
August 5	Turkey F31 Futures; İzmir, Turkey; Hard $10,000	Brydan Klein; Dane Propoggia; 5–7, 7–5, [10–4]	Dorian Descloix; Jaime Pulgar-García	Brydan Klein; Tucker Vorster	Denis Yevseyev; David Pel; Andrew Whittington; Maximiliano Estévez
August 5	USA F22 Futures; Edwardsville, USA; Hard $10,000	Jason Jung; 6–2, 7–6^{(7–5)}	Dimitar Kutrovsky	Jean-Yves Aubone; Evan King	Daniil Proskura; Oleg Dmitriev; Michael Shabaz; Eric Quigley
August 5	USA F22 Futures; Edwardsville, USA; Hard $10,000	Keith-Patrick Crowley; Ruan Roelofse; 6–3, 6–1	Patrick Davidson; Leon Frost	Jean-Yves Aubone; Evan King	Daniil Proskura; Oleg Dmitriev; Michael Shabaz; Eric Quigley
August 5	Venezuela F3 Futures; Caracas, Venezuela; Hard $10,000	David Souto; 7–6^{(8–6)}, 6–3	Mateo Nicolás Martínez	Dean O'Brien; Luis David Martínez	Alex Llompart; José de Armas; Guilherme Hadlich; Roberto Maytín
August 5	Venezuela F3 Futures; Caracas, Venezuela; Hard $10,000	Luis David Martínez; Roberto Maytín; 1–6, 6–2, [12–10]	Alex Llompart; Mateo Nicolás Martínez	Dean O'Brien; Luis David Martínez	Alex Llompart; José de Armas; Guilherme Hadlich; Roberto Maytín
August 12	Argentina F14 Futures; San Francisco, Argentina; Clay $10,000	Tomás Lipovšek Puches; 6–3, 6–2	Facundo Mena	Pedro Cachin; Joaquin-Jesús Monteferrario	Andrés Ceppo; Gabriel Alejandro Hidalgo; José María Paniagua; Juan Ignacio Ameal
August 12	Argentina F14 Futures; San Francisco, Argentina; Clay $10,000	Juan Ignacio Galarza; Tomás Lipovšek Puches; 4–6, 6–3, [10–8]	Gabriel Alejandro Hidalgo; Mauricio Pérez Mota	Pedro Cachin; Joaquin-Jesús Monteferrario	Andrés Ceppo; Gabriel Alejandro Hidalgo; José María Paniagua; Juan Ignacio Ameal
August 12	Austria F7 Futures; Innsbruck, Austria; Clay $10,000	Laurent Lokoli; 7–6^{(7–1)}, 6–3	Dennis Novak	Louk Sorensen; Bastian Trinker	Jan Kunčík; Francesco Picco; Andrea Basso; Marc Rath
August 12	Austria F7 Futures; Innsbruck, Austria; Clay $10,000	Tommaso Lago; Francesco Mendo; 6–3, 6–4	Jan Kunčík; Richard Ruckelshausen	Louk Sorensen; Bastian Trinker	Jan Kunčík; Francesco Picco; Andrea Basso; Marc Rath
August 12	Belarus F1 Futures; Minsk, Belarus; Hard $15,000	Egor Gerasimov; 7–6^{(7–2)}, 4–6, 6–4	Andrey Rublev	Stanislav Poplavskyy; Yaraslav Shyla	Jules Marie; Lukas Mugevičius; Pavel Filin; Bar Tzuf Botzer
August 12	Belarus F1 Futures; Minsk, Belarus; Hard $15,000	Yaraslav Shyla; Andrei Vasilevski; 6–4, 7–6^{(7–2)}	Jules Marie; Fabrice Martin	Stanislav Poplavskyy; Yaraslav Shyla	Jules Marie; Lukas Mugevičius; Pavel Filin; Bar Tzuf Botzer
August 12	Belgium F9 Futures; Koksijde, Belgium; Clay $10,000	Grégoire Barrère; 3–6, 7–5, 6–3	Joris De Loore	Louis Cant; Julien Dubail	Rémy Chala; Quentin Halys; Enzo Py; Sander Gillé
August 12	Belgium F9 Futures; Koksijde, Belgium; Clay $10,000	Antoine Hoang; Alexandre Sidorenko; 6–3, 7–6^{(7–5)}	Robin Cambier; Kevin Farin	Louis Cant; Julien Dubail	Rémy Chala; Quentin Halys; Enzo Py; Sander Gillé
August 12	Brazil F5 Futures; Natal, Brazil; Clay $10,000	Fernando Romboli; 7–6^{(7–4)}, 6–2	José Pereira	Alexandre Tsuchiya; André Miele	Fernando Albuquerque; Tiago Fernandes; João Pedro Sorgi; Fabrício Neis
August 12	Brazil F5 Futures; Natal, Brazil; Clay $10,000	André Miele; João Pedro Sorgi; 6–4, 6–2	Eduardo Dischinger; Bruno Sant'Anna	Alexandre Tsuchiya; André Miele	Fernando Albuquerque; Tiago Fernandes; João Pedro Sorgi; Fabrício Neis
August 12	Canada F5 Futures; Calgary, Canada; Hard $15,000	Brayden Schnur; 7–6^{(7–5)}, 3–6, 7–6^{(7–4)}	Philip Bester	Dennis Nevolo; Peter Polansky	Steven Diez; Filip Peliwo; Milan Pokrajac; Thanasi Kokkinakis
August 12	Canada F5 Futures; Calgary, Canada; Hard $15,000	Jean-Yves Aubone; Dennis Nevolo; 7–5, 6–3	Ante Pavić; Milan Pokrajac	Dennis Nevolo; Peter Polansky	Steven Diez; Filip Peliwo; Milan Pokrajac; Thanasi Kokkinakis
August 12	China F7 Futures; Tianjin, China; Hard $15,000	Huang Liang-chi; 6–1, 7–5	Shuichi Sekiguchi	Ouyang Bowen; Nam Ji-sung	Liu Siyu; Toshihide Matsui; N. Sriram Balaji; Lee Duck-hee
August 12	China F7 Futures; Tianjin, China; Hard $15,000	N. Sriram Balaji; Ranjeet Virali-Murugesan; 6–3, 6–2	Chung Hyeon; Nam Ji-sung	Ouyang Bowen; Nam Ji-sung	Liu Siyu; Toshihide Matsui; N. Sriram Balaji; Lee Duck-hee
August 12	Colombia F4 Futures; Bogotá, Colombia; Clay $15,000	Eduardo Struvay; 6–3, 6–7^{(7–9)}, 6–3	Patricio Heras	Kevin King; Felipe Mantilla	Carlos Salamanca; Juan Manuel Benítez Chavarriaga; Mauricio Echazú; Nicolás Barrientos
August 12	Colombia F4 Futures; Bogotá, Colombia; Clay $15,000	Kevin King; Juan Carlos Spir; 6–3, 6–3	Felipe Mantilla; Eduardo Struvay	Kevin King; Felipe Mantilla	Carlos Salamanca; Juan Manuel Benítez Chavarriaga; Mauricio Echazú; Nicolás Barrientos
August 12	Croatia F7 Futures; Čakovec, Croatia; Clay $10,000	Mike Urbanija; 6–2, 6–1	Marin Bradarić	Nik Razboršek; Tomislav Brkić	Toni Androić; Martin Rmus; Tom Kočevar-Dešman; Duje Kekez
August 12	Croatia F7 Futures; Čakovec, Croatia; Clay $10,000	Tomislav Brkić; Duje Kekez; 7–5, 6–1	Francesco Borgo; Andrea Patracchini	Nik Razboršek; Tomislav Brkić	Toni Androić; Martin Rmus; Tom Kočevar-Dešman; Duje Kekez
August 12	Ecuador F1 Futures; Guayaquil, Ecuador; Clay $10,000	Emilio Gómez; 7–5, 7–6^{(7–3)}	Gonzalo Escobar	Rodrigo Sánchez; Alex Blumenberg	Juan-Pablo Amado; David Fleming; Duilio Beretta; Iván Endara
August 12	Ecuador F1 Futures; Guayaquil, Ecuador; Clay $10,000	Duilio Beretta; Roberto Quiroz; 6–1, 6–3	Sebastián Exequiel Pini; Rodrigo Sánchez	Rodrigo Sánchez; Alex Blumenberg	Juan-Pablo Amado; David Fleming; Duilio Beretta; Iván Endara
August 12	Egypt F20 Futures; Sharm El Sheikh, Egypt; Clay $10,000	Alberto Brizzi; 7–5, 6–2	Cristóbal Saavedra Corvalán	Karim-Mohamed Maamoun; Mazen Osama	Ricardo Urzúa-Rivera; Issam Haitham Taweel; José Anton Salazar Martín; Ramy Kamal Aita
August 12	Egypt F20 Futures; Sharm El Sheikh, Egypt; Clay $10,000	Cristóbal Saavedra Corvalán; Ricardo Urzúa-Rivera; 6–4, 6–2	Mauricio Álvarez-Guzmán; Sebastián Rivera	Karim-Mohamed Maamoun; Mazen Osama	Ricardo Urzúa-Rivera; Issam Haitham Taweel; José Anton Salazar Martín; Ramy Kamal Aita
August 12	Finland F2 Futures; Kotka, Finland; Clay $10,000	Matteo Donati; 7–5, 2–6, 6–1	Micke Kontinen	Tak Khunn Wang; Lucas Renard	Henrik Sillanpää; Maxime Chazal; Ronald Slobodchikov; Vladimir Ivanov
August 12	Finland F2 Futures; Kotka, Finland; Clay $10,000	Vladimir Ivanov; Yan Sabanin; 6–2, 4–6, [10–6]	Herkko Pöllänen; Henrik Sillanpää	Tak Khunn Wang; Lucas Renard	Henrik Sillanpää; Maxime Chazal; Ronald Slobodchikov; Vladimir Ivanov
August 12	Germany F14 Futures; Karlsruhe, Germany; Clay $10,000	Steven Moneke; 6–2, 3–6, 6–3	Peter Torebko	Dennis Blömke; Daniel Lustig	Luis Patiño; Kevin Kaczynski; Oscar Otte; Jonas Lütjen
August 12	Germany F14 Futures; Karlsruhe, Germany; Clay $10,000	Steven Moneke; Laslo Urrutia Fuentes; 4–6, 7–5, [10–7]	Lukáš Maršoun; Dominik Süč	Dennis Blömke; Daniel Lustig	Luis Patiño; Kevin Kaczynski; Oscar Otte; Jonas Lütjen
August 12	Italy F21 Futures; Appiano, Italy; Clay $15,000+H	Nikoloz Basilashvili; 7–5, 3–6, 6–4	Matteo Trevisan	Patrick Prader; Niels Desein	Simone Vagnozzi; Juan Lizariturry; Jorge Aguilar; Theodoros Angelinos
August 12	Italy F21 Futures; Appiano, Italy; Clay $15,000+H	Jorge Aguilar; Juan Lizariturry; 4–6, 6–3, [10–7]	Daniele Giorgini; Matteo Volante	Patrick Prader; Niels Desein	Simone Vagnozzi; Juan Lizariturry; Jorge Aguilar; Theodoros Angelinos
August 12	Poland F3 Futures; Bydgoszcz, Poland; Clay $15,000	Rui Machado; 7–6^{(7–5)}, 6–1	Benjamin Balleret	Kyle Edmund; Marek Michalička	Paweł Ciaś; Piotr Gadomski; Prajnesh Gunneswaran; Kamil Majchrzak
August 12	Poland F3 Futures; Bydgoszcz, Poland; Clay $15,000	Andriej Kapaś; Grzegorz Panfil; 3–6, 6–4, [10–5]	Adam Chadaj; Marek Michalička	Kyle Edmund; Marek Michalička	Paweł Ciaś; Piotr Gadomski; Prajnesh Gunneswaran; Kamil Majchrzak
August 12	Romania F8 Futures; Iași, Romania; Clay $15,000	Kristijan Mesaroš; 6–2, 4–6, 6–3	Victor Crivoi	Vadim Alekseenko; Costin Pavăl	Bogdan Ionuț Apostol; Patrick Ciorcilă; Teodor-Dacian Crăciun; Robert Coman
August 12	Romania F8 Futures; Iași, Romania; Clay $15,000	Alexandru-Daniel Carpen; Maxim Dubarenco; 4–6, 6–3, [10–4]	Matteo Marfia; Luca Margaroli	Vadim Alekseenko; Costin Pavăl	Bogdan Ionuț Apostol; Patrick Ciorcilă; Teodor-Dacian Crăciun; Robert Coman
August 12	Serbia F9 Futures; Novi Sad, Serbia; Clay $10,000	Carlos Gómez-Herrera; 3–6, 6–1, 6–2	Dimitar Kuzmanov	Cedrick Commin; Ivan Bjelica	Peđa Krstin; Martin Vaïsse; Arsenije Zlatanović; Alexandar Lazov
August 12	Serbia F9 Futures; Novi Sad, Serbia; Clay $10,000	Patrik Fabian; Matteo Fago; 7–5, 6–3	Ivan Sabanov; Matej Sabanov	Cedrick Commin; Ivan Bjelica	Peđa Krstin; Martin Vaïsse; Arsenije Zlatanović; Alexandar Lazov
August 12	Spain F26 Futures; Vigo, Spain; Clay $10,000	Ricardo Rodríguez; 5–7, 6–1, 6–2	Marc Giner	David Pérez Sanz; David Vega Hernández	Oriol Roca Batalla; Mario Vilella Martínez; João Domingues; Miguel Ángel López Jaén
August 12	Spain F26 Futures; Vigo, Spain; Clay $10,000	David Pérez Sanz; Frederico Ferreira Silva; 6–2, 7–6^{(7–3)}	Juan-Samuel Arauzo-Martínez; Jean-Marc Werner	David Pérez Sanz; David Vega Hernández	Oriol Roca Batalla; Mario Vilella Martínez; João Domingues; Miguel Ángel López Jaén
August 12	Switzerland F4 Futures; Geneva, Switzerland; Clay $10,000	Jakub Lustyk; 6–3, 6–4	Yann Marti	Marco Bortolotti; Adam Pavlásek	Pascal Meis; Marcos Giraldi Requena; François-Arthur Vibert; Richard Becker
August 12	Switzerland F4 Futures; Geneva, Switzerland; Clay $10,000	Pruchya Isaro; Nuttanon Kadchapanan; 2–6, 6–4, [11–9]	Kevin Griekspoor; Scott Griekspoor	Marco Bortolotti; Adam Pavlásek	Pascal Meis; Marcos Giraldi Requena; François-Arthur Vibert; Richard Becker
August 12	Turkey F32 Futures; İzmir, Turkey; Hard $10,000	Borna Ćorić; 6–7^{(0–7)}, 7–6^{(7–1)}, 7–5	Enzo Couacaud	Denis Yevseyev; Maxime Tchoutakian	Brydan Klein; Ramkumar Ramanathan; Dane Propoggia; Tucker Vorster
August 12	Turkey F32 Futures; İzmir, Turkey; Hard $10,000	Maximiliano Estévez; Tucker Vorster; 6–4, 6–3	Sébastien Boltz; Denis Yevseyev	Denis Yevseyev; Maxime Tchoutakian	Brydan Klein; Ramkumar Ramanathan; Dane Propoggia; Tucker Vorster
August 12	Venezuela F4 Futures; Caracas, Venezuela; Hard $10,000	David Souto; 6–2, 4–6, 6–2	José Hernández	Piero Luisi; Luis David Martínez	Dean O'Brien; Thomas Adriano Tenreiro; José de Armas; Jorge Brian Panta
August 12	Venezuela F4 Futures; Caracas, Venezuela; Hard $10,000	Alex Llompart; Mateo Nicolás Martínez; 7–5, 7–5	José Hernández; Roberto Maytín	Piero Luisi; Luis David Martínez	Dean O'Brien; Thomas Adriano Tenreiro; José de Armas; Jorge Brian Panta
August 19	Argentina F15 Futures; San Juan, Argentina; Clay $10,000	Andrés Molteni; 6–4, 6–7^{(2–7)}, 6–1	Juan Ignacio Londero	Joaquin-Jesús Monteferrario; Gabriel Alejandro Hidalgo	Facundo Mena; Federico Coria; Juan Ignacio Galarza; Sergio Galdós
August 19	Argentina F15 Futures; San Juan, Argentina; Clay $10,000	Andrés Molteni; Guillermo Carry; 6–1, 6–4	Martín Cuevas; Sergio Galdós	Joaquin-Jesús Monteferrario; Gabriel Alejandro Hidalgo	Facundo Mena; Federico Coria; Juan Ignacio Galarza; Sergio Galdós
August 19	Austria F8 Futures; Pörtschach, Austria; Clay $10,000	Janez Semrajc; 6–3, 6–1	Patrick Ofner	Pascal Brunner; Kevin Krawietz	Gonçalo Oliveira; Laurent Lokoli; Tristan-Samuel Weissborn; Jaroslav Pospíšil
August 19	Austria F8 Futures; Pörtschach, Austria; Clay $10,000	Jaroslav Pospíšil; Sebastian Wagner; 6–2, 7–6^{(7–4)}	Lukas Jastraunig; Tristan-Samuel Weissborn	Pascal Brunner; Kevin Krawietz	Gonçalo Oliveira; Laurent Lokoli; Tristan-Samuel Weissborn; Jaroslav Pospíšil
August 19	Belarus F2 Futures; Minsk, Belarus; Hard $15,000	Egor Gerasimov; 6–3, 6–4	Stefan Seifert	Aliaksandr Bury; Siarhei Betau	Andrei Ciumac; Denis Matsukevich; Volodymyr Uzhylovskyi; Vladzimir Kruk
August 19	Belarus F2 Futures; Minsk, Belarus; Hard $15,000	James Cluskey; Fabrice Martin; 6–3, 6–4	Andrei Ciumac; Volodymyr Uzhylovskyi	Aliaksandr Bury; Siarhei Betau	Andrei Ciumac; Denis Matsukevich; Volodymyr Uzhylovskyi; Vladzimir Kruk
August 19	Belgium F10 Futures; Jupille-sur-Meuse, Belgium; Clay $10,000	Clément Geens; 6–4, 0–6, 6–4	Joris De Loore	Kimmer Coppejans; Yannick Vandenbulcke	Oscar Otte; Dimitar Grabul; Ashley Hewitt; Maxime Forcin
August 19	Belgium F10 Futures; Jupille-sur-Meuse, Belgium; Clay $10,000	Ashley Hewitt; Daniel Smethurst; 6–1, 6–2	Maxime Forcin; Romain Gaborieau	Kimmer Coppejans; Yannick Vandenbulcke	Oscar Otte; Dimitar Grabul; Ashley Hewitt; Maxime Forcin
August 19	Brazil F6 Futures; Campos do Jordão, Brazil; Hard $15,000	Ricardo Hocevar; 6–4, 3–6, 6–3	Tiago Lopes	Thales Turini; Pedro Sakamoto	Fabrício Neis; Christian Lindell; Bruno Sant'Anna; José Pereira
August 19	Brazil F6 Futures; Campos do Jordão, Brazil; Hard $15,000	André Miele; João Pedro Sorgi; 6–4, 6–4	José Pereira; Alexandre Tsuchiya	Thales Turini; Pedro Sakamoto	Fabrício Neis; Christian Lindell; Bruno Sant'Anna; José Pereira
August 19	Canada F6 Futures; Winnipeg, Canada; Hard $15,000	John-Patrick Smith; 3–6, 6–4, 6–3	Ante Pavić	Evan King; Cameron Norrie	Filip Peliwo; Alexander Sarkissian; Érik Chvojka; Haythem Abid
August 19	Canada F6 Futures; Winnipeg, Canada; Hard $15,000	Ante Pavić; Milan Pokrajac; 6–0, 4–6 [13–11]	Filip Peliwo; David Sofaer	Evan King; Cameron Norrie	Filip Peliwo; Alexander Sarkissian; Érik Chvojka; Haythem Abid
August 19	Chinese Taipei F1 Futures; Taipei, Chinese Taipei; Hard $15,000	Huang Liang-chi; 4–6, 7–5 Ret.	Yuki Bhambri	Chen Ti; Yu Cheng-yu	Jeong Suk-young; Sean Berman; Kim Woo-ram; Danai Udomchoke
August 19	Chinese Taipei F1 Futures; Taipei, Chinese Taipei; Hard $15,000	Chen Ti; Huang Liang-chi; 6–1, 6–1	Yuichi Ito; Hiroki Kondo	Chen Ti; Yu Cheng-yu	Jeong Suk-young; Sean Berman; Kim Woo-ram; Danai Udomchoke
August 19	Colombia F5 Futures; Manizales, Colombia; Clay $10,000	Chase Buchanan; 6–1, 3–6, 6–4	Devin McCarthy	Kevin King; Juan Carlos Spir	Patricio Heras; Christopher Díaz Figueroa; Bumpei Sato; Michael Quintero
August 19	Colombia F5 Futures; Manizales, Colombia; Clay $10,000	Kevin King; Juan Carlos Spir; 6–3, 7–5	Chase Buchanan; Devin McCarthy	Kevin King; Juan Carlos Spir	Patricio Heras; Christopher Díaz Figueroa; Bumpei Sato; Michael Quintero
August 19	Croatia F8 Futures; Vinkovci, Croatia; Clay $10,000	Toni Androić; 6–3, 6–4	Tomislav Brkić	Juraj Masár; Attila Balázs	Michal Konečný; Marin Bradarić; Duje Kekez; Michal Milko
August 19	Croatia F8 Futures; Vinkovci, Croatia; Clay $10,000	Toni Androić; Tomislav Draganja; 1–6, 7–6^{(9–7)}, [10–8]	Ivan Sabanov; Matej Sabanov	Juraj Masár; Attila Balázs	Michal Konečný; Marin Bradarić; Duje Kekez; Michal Milko
August 19	Ecuador F2 Futures; Guayaquil, Ecuador; Hard $10,000	Emilio Gómez; 6–2, 6–1	Benjamin Ugarte	Gonzalo Escobar; Alex Blumenberg	Duilio Beretta; Sebastián Exequiel Pini; Pedro Iamachkine; Rodrigo Sánchez
August 19	Ecuador F2 Futures; Guayaquil, Ecuador; Hard $10,000	Emilio Gómez; Roberto Quiroz; 6–1, 6–4	Nicolás Álvarez; Duilio Beretta	Gonzalo Escobar; Alex Blumenberg	Duilio Beretta; Sebastián Exequiel Pini; Pedro Iamachkine; Rodrigo Sánchez
August 19	Egypt F21 Futures; Sharm El Sheikh, Egypt; Clay $10,000	Mohamed Safwat; 6–4, 6–3	Karim-Mohamed Maamoun	Ricardo Urzúa-Rivera; Marc Abdelnour	Nizar Belmati; Cristian Rodríguez; Mazen Osama; Martín Ríos-Benítez
August 19	Egypt F21 Futures; Sharm El Sheikh, Egypt; Clay $10,000	Marc Abdelnour; Issam Haitham Taweel; 6–3, 6–4	Nizar Belmati; Younès Rachidi	Ricardo Urzúa-Rivera; Marc Abdelnour	Nizar Belmati; Cristian Rodríguez; Mazen Osama; Martín Ríos-Benítez
August 19	Finland F3 Futures; Nastola, Finland; Clay $10,000	Matteo Donati; 6–1, 6–3	Vladimir Ivanov	Tak Khunn Wang; André Gaspar Murta	Milos Sekulic; Micke Kontinen; Edoardo Eremin; Kevin Griekspoor
August 19	Finland F3 Futures; Nastola, Finland; Clay $10,000	Anton Pavlov; Aleksandr Vasilenko; 6–0, 6–4	Mika Julin; Verneri Tuomi	Tak Khunn Wang; André Gaspar Murta	Milos Sekulic; Micke Kontinen; Edoardo Eremin; Kevin Griekspoor
August 19	Gabon F1 Futures; Libreville, Gabon; Hard $15,000	James McGee; 6–4, 7–6^{(7–4)}	Jeevan Nedunchezhiyan	Élie Rousset; Sam Barry	Hassan Ndayishimiye; Alexis Klégou; Bar Tzuf Botzer; Vishnu Vardhan
August 19	Gabon F1 Futures; Libreville, Gabon; Hard $15,000	Jeevan Nedunchezhiyan; Vishnu Vardhan; 6–4, 7–6^{(7–4)}	Sam Barry; Élie Rousset	Élie Rousset; Sam Barry	Hassan Ndayishimiye; Alexis Klégou; Bar Tzuf Botzer; Vishnu Vardhan
August 19	Germany F15 Futures; Überlingen, Germany; Clay $10,000	Jeremy Jahn; 7–6^{(7–5)}, 1–6, 6–1	Bastian Trinker	Lukáš Maršoun; Jonas Lütjen	Roman Jebavý; Dennis Blömke; Peter Torebko; Lukas Finzelberg
August 19	Germany F15 Futures; Überlingen, Germany; Clay $10,000	Florian Fallert; Nils Langer; 4–6, 6–3 [10–6]	Lukáš Maršoun; Dominik Süč	Lukáš Maršoun; Jonas Lütjen	Roman Jebavý; Dennis Blömke; Peter Torebko; Lukas Finzelberg
August 19	Italy F22 Futures; Este, Italy; Clay $15,000+H	Dominic Thiem; 6–1, 6–4	Norbert Gombos	Jorge Aguilar; Taro Daniel	Enrique López Pérez; Nicola Ghedin; Alexander Ward; Simone Vagnozzi
August 19	Italy F22 Futures; Este, Italy; Clay $15,000+H	Mate Delić; Stefano Travaglia; 6–0, 6–1	Jorge Aguilar; Guillermo Hormazábal	Jorge Aguilar; Taro Daniel	Enrique López Pérez; Nicola Ghedin; Alexander Ward; Simone Vagnozzi
August 19	Netherlands F5 Futures; Enschede, Netherlands; Clay $15,000	Steve Darcis; 7–6^{(7–2)}, 6–1	Thomas Schoorel	Axel Michon; Nicolas Reissig	Wesley Koolhof; Miliaan Niesten; Justin Eleveld; Alexey Vatutin
August 19	Netherlands F5 Futures; Enschede, Netherlands; Clay $15,000	Stephan Fransen; Wesley Koolhof w/o	Colin Ebelthite; Sander Groen	Axel Michon; Nicolas Reissig	Wesley Koolhof; Miliaan Niesten; Justin Eleveld; Alexey Vatutin
August 19	Poland F4 Futures; Poznań, Poland; Clay $15,000	Kristijan Mesaroš; 6–4, 4–6, 6–1	Benjamin Balleret	Piotr Gadomski; Rui Machado	Germain Gigounon; Kyle Edmund; Andriej Kapaś; Marcin Gawron
August 19	Poland F4 Futures; Poznań, Poland; Clay $15,000	Romain Arneodo; Benjamin Balleret; 6–2, 6–4	Phillip Gresk; Kamil Majchrzak	Piotr Gadomski; Rui Machado	Germain Gigounon; Kyle Edmund; Andriej Kapaś; Marcin Gawron
August 19	Romania F9 Futures; Mediaș, Romania; Clay $10,000	Maxim Dubarenco; 7–5, 6–1	Claudio Fortuna	Dragoș Cristian Mirtea; Filippo Leonardi	Răzvan Sabău; Vasile Antonescu; Robert Coman; Giulio Torroni
August 19	Romania F9 Futures; Mediaș, Romania; Clay $10,000	Filippo Leonardi; Giulio Torroni; 1–6, 6–3 [10–5]	Alexandru-Daniel Carpen; Maxim Dubarenco	Dragoș Cristian Mirtea; Filippo Leonardi	Răzvan Sabău; Vasile Antonescu; Robert Coman; Giulio Torroni
August 19	Russia F11 Futures; Moscow, Russia; Clay $15,000	Anton Zaitcev; 4–6, 6–4, 6–2	Mikhail Biryukov	Alexander Rumyantsev; Victor Baluda	Alexander Zhurbin; Sergey Strelkov; Ivan Nedelko; Valery Rudnev
August 19	Russia F11 Futures; Moscow, Russia; Clay $15,000	Alexandre Krasnoroutskiy; Anton Manegin; 6–2, 1–6, [10–5]	Andrey Saveliev; Mikhail Vaks	Alexander Rumyantsev; Victor Baluda	Alexander Zhurbin; Sergey Strelkov; Ivan Nedelko; Valery Rudnev
August 19	Serbia F10 Futures; Novi Sad, Serbia; Clay $10,000	Peđa Krstin; 3–6, 6–4, 6–3	Martin Vaïsse	Dimitar Kuzmanov; Tihomir Grozdanov	Patrik Fabian; Ivan Bjelica; Nikola Ćaćić; Dino Marcan
August 19	Serbia F10 Futures; Novi Sad, Serbia; Clay $10,000	Boris Čonkić; Matteo Fago; 7–6^{(7–4)}, 6–2	Denis Bejtulahi; Nikola Ćaćić	Dimitar Kuzmanov; Tihomir Grozdanov	Patrik Fabian; Ivan Bjelica; Nikola Ćaćić; Dino Marcan
August 19	Spain F27 Futures; Ourense, Spain; Hard $10,000	Juan-Samuel Arauzo-Martínez; 6–4, 3–0 Ret.	Ricardo Villacorta-Alonso	David Vega Hernández; David Pérez Sanz	Andoni Vivanco-Guzmán; Iván Arenas-Gualda; Laurent Malouli; Roberto Ortega Olmedo
August 19	Spain F27 Futures; Ourense, Spain; Hard $10,000	Juan Sebastián Gómez; Gabriel Trujillo Soler; 2–6, 6–3, [10–7]	Oriol Roca Batalla; Andoni Vivanco-Guzmán	David Vega Hernández; David Pérez Sanz	Andoni Vivanco-Guzmán; Iván Arenas-Gualda; Laurent Malouli; Roberto Ortega Olmedo
August 19	Switzerland F5 Futures; Sion, Switzerland; Clay $10,000	Richard Becker; 6–7^{(5–7)}, 7–6^{(7–1)}, 6–2	Roberto Marcora	Claudio Grassi; Oliver Golding	Riccardo Sinicropi; Alexandros Jakupovic; Yann Marti; Alessandro Bega
August 19	Switzerland F5 Futures; Sion, Switzerland; Clay $10,000	Pruchya Isaro; Nuttanon Kadchapanan; 6–4, 7–5	Michael Bois; Quentin Robert	Claudio Grassi; Oliver Golding	Riccardo Sinicropi; Alexandros Jakupovic; Yann Marti; Alessandro Bega
August 19	Turkey F33 Futures; İzmir, Turkey; Hard $10,000	Borna Ćorić; 6–4, 6–4	Tucker Vorster	Barış Ergüden; Dane Propoggia	Brydan Klein; Stanislav Vovk; Ramkumar Ramanathan; Emilien Firmin
August 19	Turkey F33 Futures; İzmir, Turkey; Hard $10,000	Daniiar Duldaev; Mark Fynn; 4–6, 6–4, [10–6]	Melik Feler; Alexander Merino	Barış Ergüden; Dane Propoggia	Brydan Klein; Stanislav Vovk; Ramkumar Ramanathan; Emilien Firmin
August 19	Venezuela F5 Futures; Caracas, Venezuela; Hard $10,000	David Souto; 7–6^{(7–5)}, 6–4	Luis David Martínez	Dean O'Brien; Mateo Nicolás Martínez	Miquel Cicenia; Roberto Maytín; Luis Fernando Ramírez; Jesús Bandrés
August 19	Venezuela F5 Futures; Caracas, Venezuela; Hard $10,000	Luis David Martínez; Roberto Maytín; 2–6, 7–6^{(7–5)}, [10–3]	Jesús Bandrés; Luis Fernando Ramírez	Dean O'Brien; Mateo Nicolás Martínez	Miquel Cicenia; Roberto Maytín; Luis Fernando Ramírez; Jesús Bandrés
August 26	Argentina F16 Futures; Santiago del Estero, Argentina; Clay $10,000	Andrés Molteni; 6–1, 4–6, 6–0	Pedro Cachin	Guillermo Durán; Nicolás Kicker	Gastón Paz; Mateo Facundo Cressa; Federico Coria; Gabriel Hidalgo
August 26	Argentina F16 Futures; Santiago del Estero, Argentina; Clay $10,000	Andrés Molteni; Guillermo Durán; 6–7^{(4–7)}, 6–3, [13–11]	Martín Cuevas; Sergio Galdós	Guillermo Durán; Nicolás Kicker	Gastón Paz; Mateo Facundo Cressa; Federico Coria; Gabriel Hidalgo
August 26	Austria F9 Futures; Vogau, Austria; Clay $10,000	Adrian Sikora; 7–5, 6–4	Bastian Trinker	Patrick Ofner; Kamil Čapkovič	Jan Poskocil; Mario Haider-Maurer; Pascal Brunner; Lukas Jastraunig
August 26	Austria F9 Futures; Vogau, Austria; Clay $10,000	Pascal Brunner; Nikolaus Moser; 6–3, 6–2	Michal Pažický; Adrian Sikora	Patrick Ofner; Kamil Čapkovič	Jan Poskocil; Mario Haider-Maurer; Pascal Brunner; Lukas Jastraunig
August 26	Belgium F11 Futures; Damme, Belgium; Clay $15,000	Germain Gigounon; 6–1, 6–1	Ashley Hewitt	Yannick Vandenbulcke; Romain Barbosa	Joris De Loore; Julien Cagnina; Dimitar Grabul; Juan Matías González Carrasco
August 26	Belgium F11 Futures; Damme, Belgium; Clay $15,000	Mauricio Astorga; Eduardo Peralta-Tello; 6–2, 6–1	Luis Patiño; Or Ram-Harel	Yannick Vandenbulcke; Romain Barbosa	Joris De Loore; Julien Cagnina; Dimitar Grabul; Juan Matías González Carrasco
August 26	Chinese Taipei F2 Futures; Taipei City, Chinese Taipei; Clay $15,000	Yuki Bhambri; 7–5, 6–4	Kento Takeuchi	Chuang Ting-yu; Sean Berman	Kim Woo-ram; Hung Jui-chen; Yuichi Ito; Ho Chih-jen
August 26	Chinese Taipei F2 Futures; Taipei City, Chinese Taipei; Clay $15,000	Takuto Niki; Arata Onozawa; 6–4, 6–4	Chen I-ta; Hsieh Cheng-peng	Chuang Ting-yu; Sean Berman	Kim Woo-ram; Hung Jui-chen; Yuichi Ito; Ho Chih-jen
August 26	Croatia F9 Futures; Osijek, Croatia; Clay $10,000	Kristijan Mesaroš; 6–0, 6–7^{(4–7)}, 6–3	Nikola Mektić	Ivan Bjelica; Michal Konečný	Joško Topić; Matej Sabanov; Ismar Gorčić; Attila Balázs
August 26	Croatia F9 Futures; Osijek, Croatia; Clay $10,000	Mate Delić; Antonio Šančić; 7–6^{(7–5)}, 7–5	Tomislav Draganja; Anton Vidak	Ivan Bjelica; Michal Konečný	Joško Topić; Matej Sabanov; Ismar Gorčić; Attila Balázs
August 26	Ecuador F3 Futures; Quito, Ecuador; Clay $10,000	Chase Buchanan; 6–0, 6–4	Miguel Gallardo Valles	Iván Endara; Duilio Beretta	Christopher Racz; Sebastián Exequiel Pini; Mauricio Echazú; Karim Alejandro Mignani
August 26	Ecuador F3 Futures; Quito, Ecuador; Clay $10,000	Vicente Bronstein; Sebastián Exequiel Pini; 7–5, 6–3	Juan-Pablo Amado; Juan Manuel Matute	Iván Endara; Duilio Beretta	Christopher Racz; Sebastián Exequiel Pini; Mauricio Echazú; Karim Alejandro Mignani
August 26	Egypt F22 Futures; Sharm El Sheikh, Egypt; Clay $10,000	Mohamed Safwat; 6–2, 4–6, 6–3	Mazen Osama	Karim-Mohamed Maamoun; N. Sriram Balaji	Ricardo Urzúa-Rivera; Ranjeet Virali-Murugesan; Ivan Nedelko; Issam Haitham Taweel
August 26	Egypt F22 Futures; Sharm El Sheikh, Egypt; Clay $10,000	Sebastián Rivera; Ricardo Urzúa-Rivera; 6–4, 7–6^{(7–4)}	N. Sriram Balaji; Ranjeet Virali-Murugesan	Karim-Mohamed Maamoun; N. Sriram Balaji	Ricardo Urzúa-Rivera; Ranjeet Virali-Murugesan; Ivan Nedelko; Issam Haitham Taweel
August 26	Gabon F2 Futures; Libreville, Gabon; Clay $15,000	Arthur Surreaux; 4–6, 6–4, 7–5	Jeevan Nedunchezhiyan	Sam Barry; Élie Rousset	Bar Tzuf Botzer; Vishnu Vardhan; Rudy Coco; Matías Castro
August 26	Gabon F2 Futures; Libreville, Gabon; Clay $15,000	Sam Barry; Élie Rousset; 6–0, 6–0	Jeevan Nedunchezhiyan; Vishnu Vardhan	Sam Barry; Élie Rousset	Bar Tzuf Botzer; Vishnu Vardhan; Rudy Coco; Matías Castro
August 26	Germany F16 Futures; Kenn, Germany; Clay $10,000	Yannick Maden; 6–4, 4–6, 6–3	Constant Lestienne	Roman Jebavý; Sebastian Fanselow	David Thurner; Cristóbal Saavedra Corvalán; François-Arthur Vibert; Steven Moneke
August 26	Germany F16 Futures; Kenn, Germany; Clay $10,000	Sander Groen; Roman Jebavý; 6–1, retired	Jérôme Inzerillo; François-Arthur Vibert	Roman Jebavý; Sebastian Fanselow	David Thurner; Cristóbal Saavedra Corvalán; François-Arthur Vibert; Steven Moneke
August 26	Great Britain F17 Futures; Wrexham, Great Britain; Clay $10,000	Daniel Cox; 6–2, 6–3	Marcus Willis	Lewis Burton; Liam Broady	Joshua Ward-Hibbert; Sam Hutt; Adam Thornton-Brown; Richard Bloomfield
August 26	Great Britain F17 Futures; Wrexham, Great Britain; Clay $10,000	George Coupland; Marcus Willis; 7–6^{(8–6)}, 6–3	Liam Broady; Joshua Ward-Hibbert	Lewis Burton; Liam Broady	Joshua Ward-Hibbert; Sam Hutt; Adam Thornton-Brown; Richard Bloomfield
August 26	Italy F23 Futures; Piombino, Italy; Clay $15,000	Robin Kern; 3–6, 7–6^{(7–4)}, 6–2	Michael Lammer	Stefan Seifert; Claudio Grassi	Federico Gaio; Ruben Gonzales; Alessandro Bega; Riccardo Ghedin
August 26	Italy F23 Futures; Piombino, Italy; Clay $15,000	Riccardo Ghedin; Claudio Grassi; 6–4, 6–7^{(5–7)}, [10–7]	Antoine Benneteau; Luca Vanni	Stefan Seifert; Claudio Grassi	Federico Gaio; Ruben Gonzales; Alessandro Bega; Riccardo Ghedin
August 26	Netherlands F6 Futures; Rotterdam, Netherlands; Clay $15,000	Marc Rath; 6–4, 2–6, 6–3	Antal van der Duim	Boy Westerhof; Matwé Middelkoop	Maximilian Dinslaken; Alexey Vatutin; Philip De Vetter; Wesley Koolhof
August 26	Netherlands F6 Futures; Rotterdam, Netherlands; Clay $15,000	Antal van der Duim; Boy Westerhof; 6–7^{(4–7)}, 6–4, [11–9]	Stephan Fransen; Wesley Koolhof	Boy Westerhof; Matwé Middelkoop	Maximilian Dinslaken; Alexey Vatutin; Philip De Vetter; Wesley Koolhof
August 26	Poland F5 Futures; Bytom, Poland; Clay $15,000	Blaž Rola walkover	Filip Krajinović	Andriej Kapaś; Rui Machado	Błażej Koniusz; Grzegorz Panfil; Jānis Podžus; Robert Rumler
August 26	Poland F5 Futures; Bytom, Poland; Clay $15,000	Piotr Gadomski; Mateusz Kowalczyk; 6–3, 6–3	Andriej Kapaś; Grzegorz Panfil	Andriej Kapaś; Rui Machado	Błażej Koniusz; Grzegorz Panfil; Jānis Podžus; Robert Rumler
August 26	Romania F10 Futures; Brașov, Romania; Clay $10,000	Victor Crivoi; 6–4, 6–2	Filippo Leonardi	Hans Podlipnik Castillo; Claudio Fortuna	Antonio Campo; Patrick Ciorcilă; Maxim Dubarenco; Jozef Kovalík
August 26	Romania F10 Futures; Brașov, Romania; Clay $10,000	Alexandru-Daniel Carpen; Hans Podlipnik Castillo; 6–7^{(5–7)}, 6–2, [10–8]	Teodor-Dacian Crăciun; Petru-Alexandru Luncanu	Hans Podlipnik Castillo; Claudio Fortuna	Antonio Campo; Patrick Ciorcilă; Maxim Dubarenco; Jozef Kovalík
August 26	Russia F12 Futures; Moscow, Russia; Clay $15,000	Alexander Rumyantsev; 6–1, 7–5	Vadim Alekseenko	Mikhail Biryukov; Siarhei Betau	Victor Baluda; Anton Zaitcev; Evgeny Karlovskiy; Yan Sabanin
August 26	Russia F12 Futures; Moscow, Russia; Clay $15,000	Siarhei Betau; Aliaksandr Bury; 6–1, 7–6^{(7–2)}	Evgeny Karlovskiy; Igor Smilansky	Mikhail Biryukov; Siarhei Betau	Victor Baluda; Anton Zaitcev; Evgeny Karlovskiy; Yan Sabanin
August 26	Serbia F11 Futures; Zlatibor, Serbia; Clay $10,000	Laslo Djere; 7–6^{(7–0)}, 6–3	Peđa Krstin	Denis Bejtulahi; Tomislav Jotovski	Miljan Zekić; Duje Kekez; Miki Janković; Dino Marcan
August 26	Serbia F11 Futures; Zlatibor, Serbia; Clay $10,000	Duje Kekez; Ilija Vučić; 6–3, 6–4	Denis Bejtulahi; Nikola Ćaćić	Denis Bejtulahi; Tomislav Jotovski	Miljan Zekić; Duje Kekez; Miki Janković; Dino Marcan
August 26	Spain F28 Futures; Pozoblanco, Spain; Clay $15,000	Andrés Artuñedo; 6–7^{(6–8)}, 6–0, 6–1	David Pérez Sanz	Ricardo Rodríguez; Edualdo Bonet-de Gispert	José Checa Calvo; Jorge Hernando-Ruano; Ricardo Villacorta-Alonso; Juan Sebastián Gómez
August 26	Spain F28 Futures; Pozoblanco, Spain; Clay $15,000	James Cluskey; Maximilian Neuchrist; 6–3, 6–2	Iván Arenas-Gualda; José Checa Calvo	Ricardo Rodríguez; Edualdo Bonet-de Gispert	José Checa Calvo; Jorge Hernando-Ruano; Ricardo Villacorta-Alonso; Juan Sebastián Gómez
August 26	Switzerland F6 Futures; Lausanne, Switzerland; Clay $10,000	Alberto Brizzi; 6–3, 6–2	Yann Marti	Laurent Recouderc; Adam Pavlásek	Grégoire Burquier; Pascal Meis; Pruchya Isaro; Marcos Giraldi Requena
August 26	Switzerland F6 Futures; Lausanne, Switzerland; Clay $10,000	Pruchya Isaro; Nuttanon Kadchapanan; 6–3, 6–4	Stefan Fiacan; Marcos Giraldi Requena	Laurent Recouderc; Adam Pavlásek	Grégoire Burquier; Pascal Meis; Pruchya Isaro; Marcos Giraldi Requena
August 26	Turkey F34 Futures; Antalya, Turkey; Clay $10,000	Marsel İlhan; 6–4, 6–2	Maximiliano Estévez	Richard Gabb; Dekel Bar	Tobias Simon; Stanislav Vovk; Marcus Daniell; Andrei Plotniy
August 26	Turkey F34 Futures; Antalya, Turkey; Clay $10,000	Dekel Bar; Tobias Blomgren; 2–6, 6–4, [10–8]	Marcus Daniell; Richard Gabb	Richard Gabb; Dekel Bar	Tobias Simon; Stanislav Vovk; Marcus Daniell; Andrei Plotniy

=== September ===
Week of	Tournament	Winner	Runners-up	Semifinalists	Quarterfinalists
September 2	Canada F7 Futures; Toronto, Canada; Clay $15,000	Peter Polansky; 6–1, 6–1	Jason Jung	Michael Shabaz; Jean-Yves Aubone	Leon Frost; Eric Quigley; Brayden Schnur; Evan King
September 2	Canada F7 Futures; Toronto, Canada; Clay $15,000	Jean-Yves Aubone; Sekou Bangoura; 6–4, 6–4	Milan Pokrajac; Peter Polansky	Michael Shabaz; Jean-Yves Aubone	Leon Frost; Eric Quigley; Brayden Schnur; Evan King
September 2	France F14 Futures; Bagnères-de-Bigorre, France; Hard $15,000+H	Alexandre Penaud; 1–6, 6–4, 6–4	Hugo Nys	Vincent Millot; Paul Cayre	Maxime Authom; Maximilian Abel; Antoine Benneteau; Niels Desein
September 2	France F14 Futures; Bagnères-de-Bigorre, France; Hard $15,000+H	Antoine Benneteau; Hugo Nys; 6–3, 4–6, [10–2]	Riccardo Ghedin; Claudio Grassi	Vincent Millot; Paul Cayre	Maxime Authom; Maximilian Abel; Antoine Benneteau; Niels Desein
September 2	Georgia F1 Futures; Telavi, Georgia; Clay $15,000	Toni Androić; 6–2, 4–6, 7–5	Benjamin Balleret	Romain Arneodo; Błażej Koniusz	Arkadiusz Kocyła; Yuriy Kryvoy; Marat Deviatiarov; Peter Goldsteiner
September 2	Georgia F1 Futures; Telavi, Georgia; Clay $15,000	Romain Arneodo; Benjamin Balleret; 7–6^{(7–5)}, 6–0	Arkadiusz Kocyła; Błażej Koniusz	Romain Arneodo; Błażej Koniusz	Arkadiusz Kocyła; Yuriy Kryvoy; Marat Deviatiarov; Peter Goldsteiner
September 2	Russia F13 Futures; Taganrog, Russia; Clay $15,000	Mikhail Biryukov; 7–6^{(7–4)}, 7–6^{(7–4)}	Valery Rudnev	Alexander Rumyantsev; Vadim Alekseenko	Mikhail Vaks; Fedor Chervyakov; Ivan Anikanov; Sergey Strelkov
September 2	Russia F13 Futures; Taganrog, Russia; Clay $15,000	Aslan Karatsev; Mikhail Vaks; 3–6, 7–5, [10–5]	Ivan Anikanov; Vladzimir Kruk	Alexander Rumyantsev; Vadim Alekseenko	Mikhail Vaks; Fedor Chervyakov; Ivan Anikanov; Sergey Strelkov
September 2	Spain F29 Futures; Oviedo, Spain; Clay $15,000	José Checa Calvo; 6–4, 6–7^{(5–7)}, 6–2	Juan Lizariturry	Oriol Roca Batalla; Jean-Marc Werner	Albert Alcaraz Ivorra; David Pérez Sanz; Juan Sebastián Gómez; Ivan Gakhov
September 2	Spain F29 Futures; Oviedo, Spain; Clay $15,000	Juan Sebastián Gómez; Gabriel Trujillo Soler; 6–4, 6–3	José Checa Calvo; Andoni Vivanco-Guzmán	Oriol Roca Batalla; Jean-Marc Werner	Albert Alcaraz Ivorra; David Pérez Sanz; Juan Sebastián Gómez; Ivan Gakhov
September 2	Argentina F17 Futures; La Rioja, Argentina; Clay $10,000	Gabriel Alejandro Hidalgo; 3–6, 6–2, 7–5	Stefano Travaglia	Eduardo Agustín Torre; Guillermo Durán	Pedro Cachin; Daniel Dutra da Silva; Dante Gennaro; Matías Rodolfo Buchhass
September 2	Argentina F17 Futures; La Rioja, Argentina; Clay $10,000	Daniel Dutra da Silva; Christian Lindell; 6–2, 4–6, [10–7]	Eduardo Agustín Torre; Stefano Travaglia	Eduardo Agustín Torre; Guillermo Durán	Pedro Cachin; Daniel Dutra da Silva; Dante Gennaro; Matías Rodolfo Buchhass
September 2	Austria F10 Futures; St. Pölten, Austria; Clay $10,000	Nikolaus Moser; 6–1, 4–6, 6–1	Kevin Krawietz	Marko Daniš; Sebastian Fanselow	Václav Šafránek; Tristan-Samuel Weissborn; Lukáš Maršoun; Ryan Agar
September 2	Austria F10 Futures; St. Pölten, Austria; Clay $10,000	Danylo Kalenichenko; Adrian Partl; 6–3, 6–2	Ryan Agar; Sebastian Bader	Marko Daniš; Sebastian Fanselow	Václav Šafránek; Tristan-Samuel Weissborn; Lukáš Maršoun; Ryan Agar
September 2	Egypt F23 Futures; Sharm El Sheikh, Egypt; Clay $10,000	Ricardo Urzúa-Rivera; 6–4, 6–1	Cristian Rodríguez	N. Sriram Balaji; Karim-Mohamed Maamoun	Pol Toledo Bagué; Vladyslav Manafov; Ranjeet Virali-Murugesan; Issam Haitham Taweel
September 2	Egypt F23 Futures; Sharm El Sheikh, Egypt; Clay $10,000	Cristian Rodríguez; Ricardo Urzúa-Rivera; 7–5, 6–1	N. Sriram Balaji; Ranjeet Virali-Murugesan	N. Sriram Balaji; Karim-Mohamed Maamoun	Pol Toledo Bagué; Vladyslav Manafov; Ranjeet Virali-Murugesan; Issam Haitham Taweel
September 2	Great Britain F18 Futures; Sheffield, United Kingdom; Hard $10,000	Liam Broady; 6–2, 6–1	Robert Carter	Daniel Cox; Richard Bloomfield	James Marsalek; Myles Orton; George Coupland; Edward Corrie
September 2	Great Britain F18 Futures; Sheffield, United Kingdom; Hard $10,000	Lewis Burton; Marcus Willis; 6–1, 6–1	Richard Bloomfield; Daniel Cox	Daniel Cox; Richard Bloomfield	James Marsalek; Myles Orton; George Coupland; Edward Corrie
September 2	Italy F24 Futures; Trieste, Italy; Clay $10,000	Matteo Donati; 6–1, 6–2	Pietro Rondoni	Mike Urbanija; Gergely Madarász	Alessandro Bega; Marco Bortolotti; Pascal Meis; Nik Razboršek
September 2	Italy F24 Futures; Trieste, Italy; Clay $10,000	Francesco Borgo; Marco Bortolotti; 6–3, 6–7^{(6–8)}, [10–4]	Matteo Fago; Omar Giacalone	Mike Urbanija; Gergely Madarász	Alessandro Bega; Marco Bortolotti; Pascal Meis; Nik Razboršek
September 2	Turkey F35 Futures; Antalya-Belconti, Turkey; Hard $10,000	Marsel İlhan; 6–1, 3–1, retired	Maximiliano Estévez	Richard Gabb; Marcus Daniell	Dane Propoggia; Jules Marie; Dekel Bar; Aldin Šetkić
September 2	Turkey F35 Futures; Antalya-Belconti, Turkey; Hard $10,000	Marcus Daniell; Richard Gabb; 6–2, 7–5	Matteo Marfia; Francesco Vilardo	Richard Gabb; Marcus Daniell	Dane Propoggia; Jules Marie; Dekel Bar; Aldin Šetkić
September 9	Australia F6 Futures; Toowoomba, Australia; Hard $15,000	Adam Feeney; 7–6^{(8–6)}, 6–4	Andrew Whittington	Luke Saville; Gavin van Peperzeel	Alex Bolt; Finn Tearney; Jordan Thompson; Brendan Moore
September 9	Australia F6 Futures; Toowoomba, Australia; Hard $15,000	Alex Bolt; Andrew Whittington; 6–1, 3–6, [10–7]	Adam Feeney; Gavin van Peperzeel	Luke Saville; Gavin van Peperzeel	Alex Bolt; Finn Tearney; Jordan Thompson; Brendan Moore
September 9	Canada F8 Futures; Toronto, Canada; Hard $15,000	Peter Polansky; 6–2, 6–2	Sanam Singh	Vijayant Malik; Michael Shabaz	Philip Bester; Fritz Wolmarans; Jason Jung; Brayden Schnur
September 9	Canada F8 Futures; Toronto, Canada; Hard $15,000	Jason Jung; Evan King; 7–5, 6–2	Milan Pokrajac; Peter Polansky	Vijayant Malik; Michael Shabaz	Philip Bester; Fritz Wolmarans; Jason Jung; Brayden Schnur
September 9	France F15 Futures; Mulhouse, France; Hard (indoor) $15,000+H	Sandro Ehrat; 7–6^{(7–5)}, 6–3	Maxime Authom	Albano Olivetti; Rudy Coco	Moritz Baumann; Julien Obry; Enzo Couacaud; Thomas Grinberg
September 9	France F15 Futures; Mulhouse, France; Hard (indoor) $15,000+H	Ryan Agar; Sebastian Bader; 6–3, 3–6, [10–8]	Pruchya Isaro; Nuttanon Kadchapanan	Albano Olivetti; Rudy Coco	Moritz Baumann; Julien Obry; Enzo Couacaud; Thomas Grinberg
September 9	Georgia F2 Futures; Telavi, Georgia; Clay $15,000	Benjamin Balleret; 3–0, retired	Toni Androić	Błażej Koniusz; Romain Arneodo	Stepan Khotulev; Alexander Zhurbin; Gleb Sakharov; Henrik Sillanpää
September 9	Georgia F2 Futures; Telavi, Georgia; Clay $15,000	Romain Arneodo; Benjamin Balleret; 7–5, 6–2	Arkadiusz Kocyła; Błażej Koniusz	Błażej Koniusz; Romain Arneodo	Stepan Khotulev; Alexander Zhurbin; Gleb Sakharov; Henrik Sillanpää
September 9	Argentina F18 Futures; Neuquén, Argentina; Clay $10,000	Tomás Lipovšek Puches; 7–5, 6–7^{(3–7)}, 6–0	Martín Cuevas	Stefano Travaglia; Francisco Bahamonde	Mariano Kestelboim; Christian Lindell; Juan Ignacio Galarza; Nicolás Jara-Lozano
September 9	Argentina F18 Futures; Neuquén, Argentina; Clay $10,000	Facundo Mena; Stefano Travaglia; 6–7^{(5–7)}, 6–1, [10–8]	Juan Manuel Benítez Chavarriaga; Juan Pablo Ficovich	Stefano Travaglia; Francisco Bahamonde	Mariano Kestelboim; Christian Lindell; Juan Ignacio Galarza; Nicolás Jara-Lozano
September 9	Egypt F24 Futures; Sharm El Sheikh, Egypt; Clay $10,000	Pol Toledo Bagué; 6–3, 0–6, 6–4	Mazen Osama	Sebastián Rivera; Mathias Bourgue	Karim Hossam; Marc Abdelnour; Cristian Rodríguez; N. Sriram Balaji
September 9	Egypt F24 Futures; Sharm El Sheikh, Egypt; Clay $10,000	N. Sriram Balaji; Ranjeet Virali-Murugesan; 6–4, 7–6^{(12–10)}	Karim Hossam; Karim-Mohamed Maamoun	Sebastián Rivera; Mathias Bourgue	Karim Hossam; Marc Abdelnour; Cristian Rodríguez; N. Sriram Balaji
September 9	Great Britain F19 Futures; Roehampton, United Kingdom; Hard $10,000	Daniel Cox; 7–6^{(10–8)}, 2–2, retired	Josh Goodall	Marcus Willis; Edward Corrie	Jathan Malik; James Marsalek; Joshua Ward-Hibbert; Tyler Hochwalt
September 9	Great Britain F19 Futures; Roehampton, United Kingdom; Hard $10,000	Lewis Burton; Marcus Willis; 4–6, 6–4, [10–8]	Edward Corrie; Joshua Ward-Hibbert	Marcus Willis; Edward Corrie	Jathan Malik; James Marsalek; Joshua Ward-Hibbert; Tyler Hochwalt
September 9	Greece F10 Futures; Filippiada, Greece; Hard $10,000	Alessandro Bega; 4–6, 6–1, 6–4	Alexandros Jakupovic	Valentin Dimov; Markos Kalovelonis	Tobias Simon; Emanuele Molina; Dinko Halachev; Charalampos Kapogiannis
September 9	Greece F10 Futures; Filippiada, Greece; Hard $10,000	Alexandros Jakupovic; Markos Kalovelonis; 6–3, 6–3	Valentin Dimov; Dinko Halachev	Valentin Dimov; Markos Kalovelonis	Tobias Simon; Emanuele Molina; Dinko Halachev; Charalampos Kapogiannis
September 9	Italy F25 Futures; Pula, Italy; Clay $10,000	Walter Trusendi; 6–3, 6–7^{(5–7)}, 6–2	Marco Bortolotti	Riccardo Sinicropi; Francesco Picco	Pietro Rondoni; Jakub Lustyk; Edoardo Eremin; Matteo Donati
September 9	Italy F25 Futures; Pula, Italy; Clay $10,000	Pietro Rondoni; Riccardo Sinicropi; 6–3, 6–4	Nicola Ghedin; Andrea Patracchini	Riccardo Sinicropi; Francesco Picco	Pietro Rondoni; Jakub Lustyk; Edoardo Eremin; Matteo Donati
September 9	Serbia F12 Futures; Subotica, Serbia; Clay $10,000	Marek Michalička; 6–1, 6–1	Dominik Süč	Nik Razboršek; Franjo Raspudić	Dejan Katić; Denis Bejtulahi; Dimitar Grabul; Pietro Licciardi
September 9	Serbia F12 Futures; Subotica, Serbia; Clay $10,000	Adrian Partl; Dominik Süč; 7–6^{(7–5)}, 6–7^{(3–7)}, [10–1]	Péter Balla; Gergely Madarász	Nik Razboršek; Franjo Raspudić	Dejan Katić; Denis Bejtulahi; Dimitar Grabul; Pietro Licciardi
September 9	Spain F30 Futures; Madrid, Spain; Hard $10,000	Iván Arenas-Gualda; 6–2, 6–4	Jaime Pulgar-García	Oriol Roca Batalla; Yannick Jankovits	Sergio Magro Moreno; Federico Zeballos; Giammarco Micolani; David Vega Hernández
September 9	Spain F30 Futures; Madrid, Spain; Hard $10,000	Oriol Roca Batalla; Adam Sanjurjo Hermida; 7–6^{(7–3)}, 6–4	Alejandro Mendoza; Federico Zeballos	Oriol Roca Batalla; Yannick Jankovits	Sergio Magro Moreno; Federico Zeballos; Giammarco Micolani; David Vega Hernández
September 9	Sweden F4 Futures; Gothenburg, Sweden; Hard (indoor) $10,000	Tim Nekic; 2–6, 6–4, 6–4	Tobias Blomgren	Daniel Berta; Milos Sekulic	Hugo Nys; Elias Ymer; Pirmin Hänle; Robin Olin
September 9	Sweden F4 Futures; Gothenburg, Sweden; Hard (indoor) $10,000	Jesper Brunström; Hugo Nys; 6–3, 7–6^{(7–5)}	Pierre Bonfre; Viktor Stjern	Daniel Berta; Milos Sekulic	Hugo Nys; Elias Ymer; Pirmin Hänle; Robin Olin
September 9	Turkey F36 Futures; Antalya-Belconti, Turkey; Hard $10,000	Federico Gaio; 3–6, 7–6^{(7–2)}, 6–1	Richard Gabb	Bastian Trinker; Dimitri Bretting	Maximiliano Estévez; Laurynas Grigelis; Denys Mylokostov; Igor Karpov
September 9	Turkey F36 Futures; Antalya-Belconti, Turkey; Hard $10,000	Federico Gaio; Laurynas Grigelis; 1–6, 6–3, [10–8]	Dekel Bar; Richard Gabb	Bastian Trinker; Dimitri Bretting	Maximiliano Estévez; Laurynas Grigelis; Denys Mylokostov; Igor Karpov
September 9	USA F23 Futures; Claremont, United States; Hard $10,000	Marcos Giron; 6–0, 7–5	Dennis Novikov	Haythem Abid; Nicolas Meister	Damon Gooch; Sho Katayama; Ernesto Escobedo; Jeff Dadamo
September 9	USA F23 Futures; Claremont, United States; Hard $10,000	Carsten Ball; Daniel Garza; 6–3, 6–2	Matt Fawcett; Oscar Fabian Matthews	Haythem Abid; Nicolas Meister	Damon Gooch; Sho Katayama; Ernesto Escobedo; Jeff Dadamo
September 16	Australia F7 Futures; Cairns, Australia; Hard $15,000	Andrew Whittington; 6–4, 6–4	Alex Bolt	Maverick Banes; Jordan Thompson	Blake Mott; Adam Feeney; Darren K. Polkinghorne; Kento Takeuchi
September 16	Australia F7 Futures; Cairns, Australia; Hard $15,000	Alex Bolt; Andrew Whittington; 6–3, 6–2	Isaac Frost; Kento Takeuchi	Maverick Banes; Jordan Thompson	Blake Mott; Adam Feeney; Darren K. Polkinghorne; Kento Takeuchi
September 16	Brazil F8 Futures; Caxias do Sul, Brazil; Clay $15,000	Fabrício Neis; 6–2, 6–2	Pedro Sakamoto	Rafael Camilo; João Pedro Sorgi	Idio Escobar; Eduardo Dischinger; Gabriel Vellinho Hocevar; Charles Costa
September 16	Brazil F8 Futures; Caxias do Sul, Brazil; Clay $15,000	Fabrício Neis; João Pedro Sorgi; 6–3, 3–6, [10–6]	João Menezes; Evaldo Neto	Rafael Camilo; João Pedro Sorgi	Idio Escobar; Eduardo Dischinger; Gabriel Vellinho Hocevar; Charles Costa
September 16	Canada F9 Futures; Markham, Canada; Hard (indoor) $15,000+H	Filip Peliwo; Walkover	Philip Bester	Andrew Carter; Milan Pokrajac	Hugo Di Feo; George Jecminek; Fritz Wolmarans; Evan King
September 16	Canada F9 Futures; Markham, Canada; Hard (indoor) $15,000+H	Sekou Bangoura; Evan King; 6–3, 6–2	Hans Hach; Andrew Ochotta	Andrew Carter; Milan Pokrajac	Hugo Di Feo; George Jecminek; Fritz Wolmarans; Evan King
September 16	France F16 Futures; Plaisir, France; Hard (indoor) $10,000	Niels Desein; 6–4, 6–4	Maxime Authom	Alexey Vatutin; Quentin Halys	Julien Obry; Tak Khunn Wang; Michael Lammer; Erik Crepaldi
September 16	France F16 Futures; Plaisir, France; Hard (indoor) $10,000	Rémi Boutillier; Julien Obry; 3–6, 7–6^{(7–4)}, [16–14]	Colin O'Brien; Dean O'Brien	Alexey Vatutin; Quentin Halys	Julien Obry; Tak Khunn Wang; Michael Lammer; Erik Crepaldi
September 16	Argentina F19 Futures; Córdoba, Argentina; Clay $10,000	Nicolás Kicker; 2–6, 6–4, 6–3	Martín Cuevas	Gabriel Alejandro Hidalgo; Juan Ignacio Galarza	Franco Agamenone; Pedro Cachin; Joss Espasandin; Mauricio Pérez Mota
September 16	Argentina F19 Futures; Córdoba, Argentina; Clay $10,000	Nicolás Kicker; Mateo Nicolás Martínez; 2–6, 6–3, [14–12]	Tomás Buchhass; Mariano Urli	Gabriel Alejandro Hidalgo; Juan Ignacio Galarza	Franco Agamenone; Pedro Cachin; Joss Espasandin; Mauricio Pérez Mota
September 16	Egypt F25 Futures; Sharm El Sheikh, Egypt; Clay $10,000	Mathias Bourgue; 6–4, 6–2	Karim-Mohamed Maamoun	Mazen Osama; Ivan Nedelko	Issam Haitham Taweel; Prajnesh Gunneswaran; Pol Toledo Bagué; Dariusz Lipka
September 16	Egypt F25 Futures; Sharm El Sheikh, Egypt; Clay $10,000	Prajnesh Gunneswaran; Issam Haitham Taweel; 6–3, 6–2	Filippo Borella; Aleksandr Ivanovich Spirin	Mazen Osama; Ivan Nedelko	Issam Haitham Taweel; Prajnesh Gunneswaran; Pol Toledo Bagué; Dariusz Lipka
September 16	Greece F11 Futures; Thessaloniki, Greece; Clay $10,000	Theodoros Angelinos; 6–4, 6–4	François-Arthur Vibert	Marco Bortolotti; Sam Barry	Tobias Hinzmann; Jonas Merckx; Emanuele Molina; Peter Goldsteiner
September 16	Greece F11 Futures; Thessaloniki, Greece; Clay $10,000	Lorenzo Frigerio; Andrea Patracchini; 4–6, 6–3, [10–2]	Florian Barth; François-Arthur Vibert	Marco Bortolotti; Sam Barry	Tobias Hinzmann; Jonas Merckx; Emanuele Molina; Peter Goldsteiner
September 16	Italy F26 Futures; Pula, Italy; Clay $10,000	Walter Trusendi; 4–6, 6–3, 6–3	Francesco Picco	Matteo Donati; Riccardo Sinicropi	Jakub Lustyk; Florian Fallert; Omar Giacalone; Imran Aswat
September 16	Italy F26 Futures; Pula, Italy; Clay $10,000	Matteo Fago; Manuel Mazzella; 6–2, 7–5	Federico Ottolini; Riccardo Sinicropi	Matteo Donati; Riccardo Sinicropi	Jakub Lustyk; Florian Fallert; Omar Giacalone; Imran Aswat
September 16	Kuwait F1 Futures; Mishref, Kuwait; Hard $10,000	Mohammad Ghareeb; 6–4, 6–1	Saketh Myneni	Abdullah Maqdes; Sadio Doumbia	Thomas Statzberger; Matías Castro; Soichiro Moritani; Marcus Willis
September 16	Kuwait F1 Futures; Mishref, Kuwait; Hard $10,000	Lewis Burton; Marcus Willis; 6–4, 7–5	Patrick Davidson; Saketh Myneni	Abdullah Maqdes; Sadio Doumbia	Thomas Statzberger; Matías Castro; Soichiro Moritani; Marcus Willis
September 16	Serbia F13 Futures; Niš, Serbia; Clay $10,000	Julien Cagnina; 6–2, 6–3	Vasile Antonescu	Ivan Bjelica; Adrian Partl	Peđa Krstin; Saša Stojisavljević; Ismar Gorčić; Ciprian Alexandru Porumb
September 16	Serbia F13 Futures; Niš, Serbia; Clay $10,000	Marko Daniš; Adrian Partl; 6–2, 6–7^{(3–7)}, [12–10]	Ivan Bjelica; Ilija Vučić	Ivan Bjelica; Adrian Partl	Peđa Krstin; Saša Stojisavljević; Ismar Gorčić; Ciprian Alexandru Porumb
September 16	Spain F31 Futures; Getafe, Spain; Hard $10,000	Oriol Roca Batalla; 7–5, 6–3	David Vega Hernández	Ricardo Villacorta-Alonso; Jaime Pulgar-García	Roberto Ortega Olmedo; Yannick Jankovits; Federico Zeballos; David Pérez Sanz
September 16	Spain F31 Futures; Getafe, Spain; Hard $10,000	David Pérez Sanz; Jaime Pulgar-García; 5–7, 6–4, [10–8]	Roberto Ortega Olmedo; Oriol Roca Batalla	Ricardo Villacorta-Alonso; Jaime Pulgar-García	Roberto Ortega Olmedo; Yannick Jankovits; Federico Zeballos; David Pérez Sanz
September 16	Sweden F5 Futures; Danderyd-Stockholm, Sweden; Hard (indoor) $10,000	Micke Kontinen; 6–4, 1–6, 7–5	Markus Eriksson	Daniel Windahl; Érik Chvojka	Patrik Rosenholm; Constant Lestienne; Jonas Lütjen; Hugo Nys
September 16	Sweden F5 Futures; Danderyd-Stockholm, Sweden; Hard (indoor) $10,000	Isak Arvidsson; Micke Kontinen; 7–5, 6–2	Érik Chvojka; Lucas Renard	Daniel Windahl; Érik Chvojka	Patrik Rosenholm; Constant Lestienne; Jonas Lütjen; Hugo Nys
September 16	Turkey F37 Futures; Antalya-Belconti, Turkey; Hard $10,000	Laurynas Grigelis; 6–2, 6–3	Claudio Fortuna	Denis Yevseyev; Jared Donaldson	Maximiliano Estévez; Adam El Mihdawy; Bastian Trinker; Federico Gaio
September 16	Turkey F37 Futures; Antalya-Belconti, Turkey; Hard $10,000	Federico Gaio; Laurynas Grigelis; 6–3, 7-6^{(7–5)}	Alexandre Krasnoroutskiy; Anton Manegin	Denis Yevseyev; Jared Donaldson	Maximiliano Estévez; Adam El Mihdawy; Bastian Trinker; Federico Gaio
September 16	USA F24 Futures; Costa Mesa, United States; Hard $10,000	Haythem Abid; 6–1, 4–6, 7–5	Ernesto Escobedo	Jeff Dadamo; Marcos Giron	Nicolas Meister; Connor Farren; Alexander Sarkissian; Noah Rubin
September 16	USA F24 Futures; Costa Mesa, United States; Hard $10,000	Marcos Giron; Mackenzie McDonald; 6–3, 6–2	Keith-Patrick Crowley; Matt Fawcett	Jeff Dadamo; Marcos Giron	Nicolas Meister; Connor Farren; Alexander Sarkissian; Noah Rubin
September 23	Australia F8 Futures; Alice Springs, Australia; Hard $15,000+H	Jordan Thompson; 6–4, 6–1	Yuichi Ito	Luke Saville; Yusuke Watanuki	Brendan Moore; Gavin van Peperzeel; Adam Feeney; Omar Jasika
September 23	Australia F8 Futures; Alice Springs, Australia; Hard $15,000+H	Alex Bolt; Andrew Whittington; 6–3, 6–3	Adam Feeney; Gavin van Peperzeel	Luke Saville; Yusuke Watanuki	Brendan Moore; Gavin van Peperzeel; Adam Feeney; Omar Jasika
September 23	Brazil F9 Futures; Belém, Brazil; Hard $15,000+H	Bruno Sant'Anna; 6–4, 7–5	Fernando Romboli	Thales Turini; José Pereira	Fabiano de Paula; Marcos Vinicius da Silva Dias; Daniel Dutra da Silva; André Miele
September 23	Brazil F9 Futures; Belém, Brazil; Hard $15,000+H	José Pereira; Alexandre Tsuchiya; 7–6^{(7–5)}, 7–6^{(11–9)}	Rafael Camilo; Fernando Romboli	Thales Turini; José Pereira	Fabiano de Paula; Marcos Vinicius da Silva Dias; Daniel Dutra da Silva; André Miele
September 23	Burundi F1 Futures; Bujumbura, Burundi; Clay $15,000	Yannick Mertens; 6–2, 6–1	Lukas Jastraunig	Gerald Melzer; Jeevan Nedunchezhiyan	Gilles de Sousa; Alexandar Lazov; Lorenzo Papasidero; Mark Fynn
September 23	Burundi F1 Futures; Bujumbura, Burundi; Clay $15,000	Yannick Mertens; Jeevan Nedunchezhiyan; 6–3, 6–2	Mark Fynn; Hassan Ndayishimiye	Gerald Melzer; Jeevan Nedunchezhiyan	Gilles de Sousa; Alexandar Lazov; Lorenzo Papasidero; Mark Fynn
September 23	Morocco F4 Futures; Agadir, Morocco; Clay $15,000	Lamine Ouahab; 6–1, 7–6^{(7–2)}	Filip Krajinović	Blaž Rola; Hicham Khaddari	Steven Moneke; Laurent Recouderc; Nils Langer; Mehdi Jdi
September 23	Morocco F4 Futures; Agadir, Morocco; Clay $15,000	Steven Moneke; Hans Podlipnik Castillo; 6–3, 6–1	Rafael Mazón-Hernández; Alberto Santos Bravo	Blaž Rola; Hicham Khaddari	Steven Moneke; Laurent Recouderc; Nils Langer; Mehdi Jdi
September 23	Spain F32 Futures; Seville, Spain; Clay $15,000	Gerard Granollers; 6–1, 4–6, 6–1	Jean-Marc Werner	José Checa Calvo; Taro Daniel	Matthew Short; David Pérez Sanz; Oriol Roca Batalla; Matwé Middelkoop
September 23	Spain F32 Futures; Seville, Spain; Clay $15,000	Eduard Esteve Lobato; Oriol Roca Batalla; 6–2, 6–3	Matwé Middelkoop; Ramkumar Ramanathan	José Checa Calvo; Taro Daniel	Matthew Short; David Pérez Sanz; Oriol Roca Batalla; Matwé Middelkoop
September 23	Argentina F20 Futures; Córdoba, Argentina; Clay $10,000	Nicolás Kicker; 6–3, 6–2	Pedro Cachin	Rodrigo Senattore; Pablo Galdón	Gabriel Alejandro Hidalgo; Fabricio Burdisso; Tomás Lipovšek Puches; Joaquin-Jesús Monteferrario
September 23	Argentina F20 Futures; Córdoba, Argentina; Clay $10,000	Mateo Facundo Cressa; Matías-Omar Tello; 6–2, 7–5	Esteban Bruna; Alexander Kuerschner	Rodrigo Senattore; Pablo Galdón	Gabriel Alejandro Hidalgo; Fabricio Burdisso; Tomás Lipovšek Puches; Joaquin-Jesús Monteferrario
September 23	Bolivia F3 Futures; Cochabamba, Bolivia; Clay $10,000	Chase Buchanan; 6–2, 6–3	Hugo Dellien	Duilio Vallebuona; Federico Coria	Valentín Florez; Pedro Bernardi; José María Páez; Juan Manuel Matute
September 23	Bolivia F3 Futures; Cochabamba, Bolivia; Clay $10,000	Franco Feitt; José María Páez; 6–3, 6–3	Hugo Dellien; Murkel Alejandro Dellien Velasco	Duilio Vallebuona; Federico Coria	Valentín Florez; Pedro Bernardi; José María Páez; Juan Manuel Matute
September 23	Chile F4 Futures; La Serena, Chile; Clay $10,000	Guillermo Núñez; 6–4, 2–6, 6–2	Ricardo Urzúa-Rivera	Gonzalo Lama; Cristóbal Saavedra Corvalán	Jorge Montero; Wilson Leite; Devin McCarthy; Juan Carlos Sáez
September 23	Chile F4 Futures; La Serena, Chile; Clay $10,000	Juan Carlos Sáez; Ricardo Urzúa-Rivera; 7–5, 6–0	Guillermo Rivera Aránguiz; Cristóbal Saavedra Corvalán	Gonzalo Lama; Cristóbal Saavedra Corvalán	Jorge Montero; Wilson Leite; Devin McCarthy; Juan Carlos Sáez
September 23	Egypt F26 Futures; Sharm El Sheikh, Egypt; Clay $10,000	Enrique López Pérez; 6–0, 6–0	Prajnesh Gunneswaran	Karim-Mohamed Maamoun; Alexis Musialek	Gianmarco Cacace; Ivan Nedelko; Karim Hossam; Michal Schmid
September 23	Egypt F26 Futures; Sharm El Sheikh, Egypt; Clay $10,000	Romano Frantzen; Enrique López Pérez; 6–4, 4–6, [10–3]	Libor Salaba; Michal Schmid	Karim-Mohamed Maamoun; Alexis Musialek	Gianmarco Cacace; Ivan Nedelko; Karim Hossam; Michal Schmid
September 23	France F17 Futures; Forbach, France; Carpet (indoor) $10,000	Tim Pütz; 6–2, 6–2	Oscar Otte	Luca Vanni; Grégoire Jacq	Rudy Coco; Sébastien Boltz; Maximilian Dinslaken; Robin Staněk
September 23	France F17 Futures; Forbach, France; Carpet (indoor) $10,000	Andreas Mies; Oscar Otte; 6–7^{(7–9)}, 6–2, [10–7]	Tim Pütz; Lukas Storck	Luca Vanni; Grégoire Jacq	Rudy Coco; Sébastien Boltz; Maximilian Dinslaken; Robin Staněk
September 23	Greece F12 Futures; Marathon, Greece; Hard $10,000	Nikola Milojević; Walkover	Louk Sorensen	Sam Barry; Tiago Fernandes	Konstantinos Mikos; Alban Meuffels; Daniel Glancy; Kevin Griekspoor
September 23	Greece F12 Futures; Marathon, Greece; Hard $10,000	Kevin Griekspoor; Scott Griekspoor; 6–7^{(5–7)}, 6–3, [10–5]	Sam Barry; Tiago Fernandes	Sam Barry; Tiago Fernandes	Konstantinos Mikos; Alban Meuffels; Daniel Glancy; Kevin Griekspoor
September 23	Italy F27 Futures; Pula, Italy; Clay $10,000	Maxime Chazal; 7–5, 2–6, 6–4	Enrico Burzi	Gianluca Mager; Edoardo Eremin	Martin Vaïsse; Maxime Hamou; Nicola Ghedin; Walter Trusendi
September 23	Italy F27 Futures; Pula, Italy; Clay $10,000	Pietro Rondoni; Riccardo Sinicropi; 7–5, 7–5	Viktor Galović; Matteo Rigamonti	Gianluca Mager; Edoardo Eremin	Martin Vaïsse; Maxime Hamou; Nicola Ghedin; Walter Trusendi
September 23	Kuwait F2 Futures; Mishref, Kuwait; Hard $10,000	Ivo Klec; 3–6, 6–1, 6–4	Marcus Willis	Sadio Doumbia; Jordan Ubiergo	Wang Chuhan; Tristan-Samuel Weissborn; Thomas Statzberger; Tak Khunn Wang
September 23	Kuwait F2 Futures; Mishref, Kuwait; Hard $10,000	Ruan Roelofse; Tak Khunn Wang; 4–6, 6–3, [10–6]	Lewis Burton; Marcus Willis	Sadio Doumbia; Jordan Ubiergo	Wang Chuhan; Tristan-Samuel Weissborn; Thomas Statzberger; Tak Khunn Wang
September 23	Serbia F14 Futures; Sokobanja, Serbia; Clay $10,000	Nikola Mektić; 6–2, 5–2, retired	Marc Rath	Marko Tepavac; Dejan Katić	Denis Bejtulahi; Luka Ilić; Julien Cagnina; Ivo Mijic
September 23	Serbia F14 Futures; Sokobanja, Serbia; Clay $10,000	Philip Lang; Marc Rath; 6–4, 6–3	Luka Ilić; Strahinja Rakić	Marko Tepavac; Dejan Katić	Denis Bejtulahi; Luka Ilić; Julien Cagnina; Ivo Mijic
September 23	Sweden F6 Futures; Falun, Sweden; Hard (indoor) $10,000	Adrien Bossel; 6–2, 4–6, 6–1	Elias Ymer	Constant Lestienne; Markus Eriksson	Morgan Johansson; Érik Chvojka; Patrik Rosenholm; Joris De Loore
September 23	Sweden F6 Futures; Falun, Sweden; Hard (indoor) $10,000	Milos Sekulic; Fred Simonsson; 3–6, 6–3, [10–5]	Jesper Brunström; Henri Kontinen	Constant Lestienne; Markus Eriksson	Morgan Johansson; Érik Chvojka; Patrik Rosenholm; Joris De Loore
September 23	Turkey F38 Futures; Antalya-Kaya Belek, Turkey; Hard $10,000	Takanyi Garanganga; 6–4, 6–2	Michal Konečný	Adam El Mihdawy; Adam Pavlásek	Mikhail Biryukov; Laurynas Grigelis; Miliaan Niesten; Claudio Fortuna
September 23	Turkey F38 Futures; Antalya-Kaya Belek, Turkey; Hard $10,000	Rémi Boutillier; Antso Rakotondramanga; 6–2, 6–4	Ilie Babinciuc; Andrei Ciumac	Adam El Mihdawy; Adam Pavlásek	Mikhail Biryukov; Laurynas Grigelis; Miliaan Niesten; Claudio Fortuna
September 23	USA F25 Futures; Laguna Niguel, United States; Hard $10,000	Marcos Giron; 4–6, 6–1, 6–1	Jarmere Jenkins	Sahak Bazrganian; Noah Rubin	Daniel Nguyen; Connor Farren; César Ramírez; Damon Gooch
September 23	USA F25 Futures; Laguna Niguel, United States; Hard $10,000	Yoshihito Nishioka; Alan Núñez Aguilera; 6–4, 6–2	Keith-Patrick Crowley; Ashwin Vijayragavan	Sahak Bazrganian; Noah Rubin	Daniel Nguyen; Connor Farren; César Ramírez; Damon Gooch
September 30	Armenia F1 Futures; Yerevan, Armenia; Clay $15,000	Blaž Rola; 6–2, 6–4	Boy Westerhof	Antal van der Duim; Axel Michon	Benjamin Balleret; Mathias Bourgue; Richard Becker; Alexios Halebian
September 30	Armenia F1 Futures; Yerevan, Armenia; Clay $15,000	Michael Linzer; Yannik Reuter; 7–6^{(8–6)}, 6–3	Marat Deviatiarov; Vladyslav Manafov	Antal van der Duim; Axel Michon	Benjamin Balleret; Mathias Bourgue; Richard Becker; Alexios Halebian
September 30	Brazil F10 Futures; São José do Rio Preto, Brazil; Clay $15,000	João Pedro Sorgi; 6–3, 5–7, 7–6^{(7–4)}	José Pereira	Carlos Eduardo Severino; Gianluigi Quinzi	André Miele; Fernando Romboli; Thales Turini; Idio Escobar
September 30	Brazil F10 Futures; São José do Rio Preto, Brazil; Clay $15,000	José Pereira; Alexandre Tsuchiya; 6–1, 7–6^{(7–1)}	Eduardo Dischinger; Bruno Sant'Anna	Carlos Eduardo Severino; Gianluigi Quinzi	André Miele; Fernando Romboli; Thales Turini; Idio Escobar
September 30	France F18 Futures; Nevers, France; Hard (indoor) $15,000+H	Vincent Millot; 6–3, 6–1	Tristan Lamasine	David Guez; Sandro Ehrat	Calvin Hemery; Gleb Sakharov; Constantin Belot; Josselin Ouanna
September 30	France F18 Futures; Nevers, France; Hard (indoor) $15,000+H	David Rice; Sean Thornley; 6–3, 6–4	Mathieu Rodrigues; Gleb Sakharov	David Guez; Sandro Ehrat	Calvin Hemery; Gleb Sakharov; Constantin Belot; Josselin Ouanna
September 30	Hungary F1 Futures; Budapest, Hungary; Clay $15,000	Niels Desein; 5–7, 6–3, 6–2	Gerard Granollers	Simone Vagnozzi; Peter Torebko	Kevin Krawietz; Marek Michalička; Błażej Koniusz; Arthur De Greef
September 30	Hungary F1 Futures; Budapest, Hungary; Clay $15,000	Piotr Gadomski; Błażej Koniusz; 6–3, 6–3	Niels Desein; Peter Torebko	Simone Vagnozzi; Peter Torebko	Kevin Krawietz; Marek Michalička; Błażej Koniusz; Arthur De Greef
September 30	Morocco F5 Futures; Taroudannt, Morocco; Clay $15,000	Lamine Ouahab; 6–7^{(5–7)}, 6–4, 6–1	Filip Krajinović	Hans Podlipnik Castillo; Steven Moneke	Hicham Khaddari; Younès Rachidi; Nils Langer; Yassine Idmbarek
September 30	Morocco F5 Futures; Taroudannt, Morocco; Clay $15,000	Nils Langer; Steven Moneke; 6–2, 6–4	Lamine Ouahab; Younès Rachidi	Hans Podlipnik Castillo; Steven Moneke	Hicham Khaddari; Younès Rachidi; Nils Langer; Yassine Idmbarek
September 30	Rwanda F1 Futures; Kigali, Rwanda; Clay $15,000	Gerald Melzer; 6–1, 6–1	Lukas Jastraunig	Yannick Mertens; Alexandar Lazov	Mithun Murali; Lorenzo Papasidero; Mark Fynn; Jeevan Nedunchezhiyan
September 30	Rwanda F1 Futures; Kigali, Rwanda; Clay $15,000	Lukas Jastraunig; Gerald Melzer; 6–2, 6–4	Jannis Liniger; Mithun Murali	Yannick Mertens; Alexandar Lazov	Mithun Murali; Lorenzo Papasidero; Mark Fynn; Jeevan Nedunchezhiyan
September 30	Bolivia F4 Futures; La Paz, Bolivia; Clay $10,000	Hugo Dellien; 7–6^{(7–3)}, 2–6, 6–4	Chase Buchanan	Federico Coria; Ryusei Makiguchi	Jorge Brian Panta; Francisco Arrechea; Leandro Portmann; Federico Zeballos
September 30	Bolivia F4 Futures; La Paz, Bolivia; Clay $10,000	Valentín Florez; Leandro Portmann; 6–3, 6–1	Franco Feitt; José María Páez	Federico Coria; Ryusei Makiguchi	Jorge Brian Panta; Francisco Arrechea; Leandro Portmann; Federico Zeballos
September 30	Chile F5 Futures; Santiago, Chile; Clay $10,000	Gonzalo Lama; 6–2, 6–1	Facundo Mena	Cristóbal Saavedra Corvalán; Eduardo Agustín Torre	Rodrigo Sánchez; Víctor Núñez; Guillermo Rivera Aránguiz; Juan Carlos Sáez
September 30	Chile F5 Futures; Santiago, Chile; Clay $10,000	Jorge Aguilar; Víctor Núñez; 6–2, 6–7^{(2–7)}, [10–4]	Francisco Bahamonde; Facundo Mena	Cristóbal Saavedra Corvalán; Eduardo Agustín Torre	Rodrigo Sánchez; Víctor Núñez; Guillermo Rivera Aránguiz; Juan Carlos Sáez
September 30	Egypt F27 Futures; Sharm El Sheikh, Egypt; Clay $10,000	Karim Hossam; 7–6^{(7–4)}, 7–6^{(7–4)}	Enrique López Pérez	Sherif Sabry; Henrik Sillanpää	Jan Blecha; Stephan Hoiss; Ivan Nedelko; Alexis Musialek
September 30	Egypt F27 Futures; Sharm El Sheikh, Egypt; Clay $10,000	Romano Frantzen; Enrique López Pérez; 6–2, 6–1	Karim Hossam; Libor Salaba	Sherif Sabry; Henrik Sillanpää	Jan Blecha; Stephan Hoiss; Ivan Nedelko; Alexis Musialek
September 30	Germany F17 Futures; Hambach, Germany; Carpet (indoor) $10,000	Neil Pauffley; 5–7, 6–2, 6–0	Adrian Sikora	Tom Schönenberg; Matthias Wunner	Lennart Zynga; Erik Crepaldi; Andreas Mies; Hannes Wagner
September 30	Germany F17 Futures; Hambach, Germany; Carpet (indoor) $10,000	Andreas Mies; Oscar Otte; 7–5, 4–4, retired	Nikolaus Moser; Neil Pauffley	Tom Schönenberg; Matthias Wunner	Lennart Zynga; Erik Crepaldi; Andreas Mies; Hannes Wagner
September 30	Greece F13 Futures; Marathon, Greece; Hard $10,000	Yann Marti; 7–6^{(7–5)}, 6–4	Theodoros Angelinos	Richard Gabb; Kevin Griekspoor	Patrick Ciorcilă; Ryota Kishi; Nikola Milojević; Alexandros Jakupovic
September 30	Greece F13 Futures; Marathon, Greece; Hard $10,000	Riccardo Ghedin; Claudio Grassi; 6–3, 6–2	Boris Nicola Bakalov; Alban Meuffels	Richard Gabb; Kevin Griekspoor	Patrick Ciorcilă; Ryota Kishi; Nikola Milojević; Alexandros Jakupovic
September 30	Italy F28 Futures; Biella, Italy; Clay $10,000	Matteo Donati; 3–6, 7–6^{(7–3)}, 6–3	Grégoire Burquier	Filippo Baldi; Walter Trusendi	Nik Razboršek; Michael Bois; Roberto Marcora; Alberto Brizzi
September 30	Italy F28 Futures; Biella, Italy; Clay $10,000	Walter Trusendi; Matteo Volante; 4–6, 6–3, [12–10]	Francesco Borgo; Marco Bortolotti	Filippo Baldi; Walter Trusendi	Nik Razboršek; Michael Bois; Roberto Marcora; Alberto Brizzi
September 30	Kuwait F3 Futures; Mishref, Kuwait; Hard $10,000	Marcus Willis; 6–3, 6–2	Tak Khunn Wang	Ivo Klec; Tristan-Samuel Weissborn	Lewis Burton; Torsten Wietoska; Abdullah Maqdes; Matías Castro
September 30	Kuwait F3 Futures; Mishref, Kuwait; Hard $10,000	Lewis Burton; Marcus Willis; 6–2, 6–2	Thomas Statzberger; Tristan-Samuel Weissborn	Ivo Klec; Tristan-Samuel Weissborn	Lewis Burton; Torsten Wietoska; Abdullah Maqdes; Matías Castro
September 30	Mexico F13 Futures; Veracruz, Mexico; Hard $10,000	Naoki Nakagawa; 6–3, 6–4	Juan Carlos Spir	Miguel Gallardo Valles; César Ramírez	Felipe Escobar; Daniel Garza; Luis David Martínez; Dean O'Brien
September 30	Mexico F13 Futures; Veracruz, Mexico; Hard $10,000	Alex Llompart; César Ramírez; 6–4, 3–6, [10–5]	Dean O'Brien; Juan Carlos Spir	Miguel Gallardo Valles; César Ramírez	Felipe Escobar; Daniel Garza; Luis David Martínez; Dean O'Brien
September 30	Spain F33 Futures; Sabadell, Spain; Clay $10,000	José Checa Calvo; 3–6, 6–0, 6–2	Roberto Carballés Baena	Marc Giner; Juan Lizariturry	Jordi Samper Montaña; Frederico Ferreira Silva; Marcos Giraldi Requena; Oriol Roca Batalla
September 30	Spain F33 Futures; Sabadell, Spain; Clay $10,000	David Pérez Sanz; Ramkumar Ramanathan; 6–7^{(4–7)}, 6–3, [10–8]	Eduard Esteve Lobato; Oriol Roca Batalla	Marc Giner; Juan Lizariturry	Jordi Samper Montaña; Frederico Ferreira Silva; Marcos Giraldi Requena; Oriol Roca Batalla
September 30	Sweden F7 Futures; Jönköping, Sweden; Hard (indoor) $10,000	Jacob Adaktusson; 6–2, 7–6^{(11–9)}	Markus Eriksson	Patrik Rosenholm; Érik Chvojka	Pirmin Hänle; Stefan Borg; Lucas Renard; Isak Arvidsson
September 30	Sweden F7 Futures; Jönköping, Sweden; Hard (indoor) $10,000	Érik Chvojka; Patrik Rosenholm; 7–5, 6–1	Jesper Brunström; Milos Sekulic	Patrik Rosenholm; Érik Chvojka	Pirmin Hänle; Stefan Borg; Lucas Renard; Isak Arvidsson
September 30	Turkey F39 Futures; Antalya-Belconti, Turkey; Hard $10,000	Adam Pavlásek; 6–1, 6–4	Miliaan Niesten	Prajnesh Gunneswaran; Mate Pavić	Chen Ti; Dmitry Popko; Dennis Novak; Adam El Mihdawy
September 30	Turkey F39 Futures; Antalya-Belconti, Turkey; Hard $10,000	Adam El Mihdawy; Denis Yevseyev; 7–5, 6–3	Andrei Ciumac; Kirill Dmitriev	Prajnesh Gunneswaran; Mate Pavić	Chen Ti; Dmitry Popko; Dennis Novak; Adam El Mihdawy
