= Kuwait International Fair =

The Kuwait International Fair is a large fairground Founded in 1971 and located in Mishrif, Kuwait. The fairgrounds consists of six large air-conditioned exhibition halls, its largest spanning 7,000 square meters. The fairgrounds is a popular site for several exhibitions that occur in Kuwait, with over 45 occurring annually.
