= Mishref =

Residential area in Kuwait City

Mishref (Arabic: مشرف) is a residential area near Kuwait City, Kuwait, within the Hawalli Governorate, south of Bayan and west of Salwa. Mishref originally consisted of only five residential blocks. Block 6 was added at a later stage. All other blocks and extensions in the area known as West Mishref (also referred to as Mubarak Al-Abdullah) do not originally belong to Mishref.

Mishref is home to:

- Al Yarmouk Sporting Club
- Several embassies: that of Uzbekistan, Liberia, South Korea, Japan, Syria
- A United Nations (UN) Center

West Mishref is home to:

- Kuwait International Fair, a fairground with eight halls
- Embassies of: Nigeria, Lesotho, Malta, Chad, and Botswana
