= 2014 Lima Challenger – Doubles =

Doubles
- 2014 Lima Challenger

Final
- Champion: (Peru) Sergio Galdós (Argentina) Guido Pella
- Runner-up: (Brazil) Marcelo Demoliner (Venezuela) Roberto Maytín
- Score: 6–3, 6–1

Events
Singles	Doubles
← 2013 ·	Lima Challenger	· 2015 →

Andrés Molteni and Fernando Romboli were the defending champions, but both players chose not to participate.

Sergio Galdós and Guido Pella won the title, defeating Marcelo Demoliner and Roberto Maytín in the final, 6–3, 6–1.

== Seeds ==
1. (Brazil) Marcelo Demoliner / (Venezuela) Roberto Maytín (final)
2. (Argentina) Martín Alund / (Argentina) Guido Andreozzi (semifinals)
3. (Peru) Sergio Galdós / (Argentina) Guido Pella (champions)
4. (El Salvador) Marcelo Arévalo / (Mexico) Miguel Ángel Reyes-Varela (quarterfinals)

== Draw ==
=== Key ===
- Q = Qualifier
- WC = Wild card
- LL = Lucky loser
- Alt = Alternate
- SE = Special exempt
- PR = Protected ranking
- ITF = ITF entry
- JE = Junior exempt
- w/o = Walkover
- r = Retired
- d = Defaulted
- SR = Special ranking

First round
1	(Brazil) M Demoliner (Venezuela) R Maytín	3	6	[10]
(Croatia) T Androić (Serbia) N Čačić	6	1	[7]
(Peru) M Echazu (Chile) G Rivera-Aránguiz	6^{4}	6^{2}
(Chile) C Garin (Chile) JC Sáez	7^{7}	7^{7}
4	(El Salvador) M Arévalo (Mexico) MÁ Reyes-Varela	3	7^{7}	[10]
(Spain) R Carballés Baena (Chile) H Podlipnik-Castillo	6	6^{5}	[5]
(Spain) D Muñoz de la Nava (Spain) RR Hidalgo	6	6
WC	(Peru) Daniel Grana (Peru) Tori Alejandro	2	2
(Brazil) F de Paula (South Africa) D O'Brien	3	4
(Poland) K Majchrzak (Poland) G Panfil	6	6
(Dominican Republic) J Hernández (Argentina) JI Londero	5	2
3	(Peru) S Galdós (Argentina) G Pella	7	6
WC	(Peru) D Beretta (Peru) R Sánchez	6	6
WC	(Peru) JB Panta (Peru) D Vallebuona	1	4
(Argentina) Juan Ignacio Galarza (Argentina) P Heras	6	4	[8]
2	(Argentina) M Alund (Argentina) G Andreozzi	2	6	[10]

Quarterfinals
1	(Brazil) M Demoliner (Venezuela) R Maytín	6	6
(Chile) C Garin (Chile) JC Sáez	1	0
4	(El Salvador) M Arévalo (Mexico) MÁ Reyes-Varela	3	4
(Spain) D Muñoz de la Nava (Spain) RR Hidalgo	6	6
(Poland) K Majchrzak (Poland) G Panfil	6^{3}	6^{1}
3	(Peru) S Galdós (Argentina) G Pella	7^{7}	7^{7}
WC	(Peru) D Beretta (Peru) R Sánchez	5	2
2	(Argentina) M Alund (Argentina) G Andreozzi	7	6

Semifinals
1	(Brazil) M Demoliner (Venezuela) R Maytín	w/o
(Spain) D Muñoz de la Nava (Spain) RR Hidalgo
3	(Peru) S Galdós (Argentina) G Pella	4	6	[10]
2	(Argentina) M Alund (Argentina) G Andreozzi	6	4	[6]

Final
1	(Brazil) M Demoliner (Venezuela) R Maytín	3	1
3	(Peru) S Galdós (Argentina) G Pella	6	6
