= 2013 Lima Challenger – Singles =

Singles
- 2013 Lima Challenger

Final
- Champion: (Argentina) Horacio Zeballos
- Runner-up: (Argentina) Facundo Bagnis
- Score: 6–7^{(4–7)}, 6–3, 6–3

Events
| Singles | Doubles |
| ← 2012 · | Lima Challenger | · 2014 → |

Guido Andreozzi was the defending champion, but lost to compatriot Martín Alund in the quarterfinals.
Top seed Horacio Zeballos won the title defeating Facundo Bagnis 6–7^{(4–7)}, 6–3, 6–3.

== Seeds ==
1. (Argentina) Horacio Zeballos (champion)
2. (Argentina) Guido Pella (quarterfinals)
3. (Spain) Pere Riba (second round)
4. (Argentina) Martín Alund (semifinals)
5. (Argentina) Facundo Argüello (quarterfinals)
6. (Argentina) Facundo Bagnis (final)
7. (Argentina) Guido Andreozzi (quarterfinals)
8. (Brazil) Thomaz Bellucci (withdrew due to abdominal injury)
9. (Argentina) Renzo Olivo (first round)

== Draw ==
=== Key ===
- Q = Qualifier
- WC = Wild card
- LL = Lucky loser
- Alt = Alternate
- SE = Special exempt
- PR = Protected ranking
- ITF = ITF entry
- JE = Junior exempt
- w/o = Walkover
- r = Retired
- d = Defaulted
- SR = Special ranking

=== Finals ===
Semifinals
1 | (Argentina) Horacio Zeballos | 4 | 6 | 6
4 | (Argentina) Martín Alund | 6 | 3 | 4
(Brazil) Ricardo Hocevar | 2 | 4
6 | (Argentina) Facundo Bagnis | 6 | 6

Final
1 | (Argentina) Horacio Zeballos | 6^{4} | 6 | 6
6 | (Argentina) Facundo Bagnis | 7^{7} | 3 | 3

=== Top half ===
First round
1 | (Argentina) H Zeballos | 3 | 6 | 6
(Peru) D Beretta | 6 | 2 | 0
Q | (Chile) C Saavedra-Corvalán | 0 | 1
(Argentina) A Molteni | 6 | 6
(Chile) H Podlipnik-Castillo | 2 | 3
Q | (Argentina) P Cachin | 6 | 6
(Argentina) M Trungelliti | 5 | 4
5 | (Argentina) F Argüello | 7 | 6
4 | (Argentina) M Alund | 6 | 6
WC | (Peru) J Panta | 1 | 1
LL | (Chile) N Jarry | 6 | 6
(Brazil) M Demoliner | 1 | 1
(Chile) J Aguilar | 4 | 2
(Brazil) T Turini | 6 | 6
(Brazil) A Ghem | 4 | 1
7 | (Argentina) G Andreozzi | 6 | 6

Second round
1 | (Argentina) H Zeballos | 7 | 7
(Argentina) A Molteni | 5 | 5
Q | (Argentina) P Cachin | 2 | 6 | 4
5 | (Argentina) F Argüello | 6 | 3 | 6
4 | (Argentina) M Alund | 6 | 6
LL | (Chile) N Jarry | 3 | 3
(Brazil) T Turini | 3 | 1
7 | (Argentina) G Andreozzi | 6 | 6

Quarterfinals
1 | (Argentina) H Zeballos | 6 | 6
5 | (Argentina) F Argüello | 1 | 4
4 | (Argentina) M Alund | 6 | 6^{5} | 6
7 | (Argentina) G Andreozzi | 3 | 7^{7} | 1

Semifinals
1 | (Argentina) H Zeballos | 4 | 6 | 6
4 | (Argentina) M Alund | 6 | 3 | 4

=== Bottom half ===
First round
9 | (Argentina) R Olivo | 6 | 5 | 3
(Brazil) R Hocevar | 1 | 7 | 6
(Argentina) P Heras | 2 | 6 | 6
WC | (Peru) S Galdós | 6 | 2 | 2
(Chile) C Garin | 7 | 5 | 6
(Canada) S Diez | 5 | 7 | 2
(Brazil) F Romboli | 5 | 1
3 | (Spain) P Riba | 7 | 6
6 | (Argentina) F Bagnis | 6 | 7^{7}
LL | (Peru) D Vallebuona | 3 | 6^{5}
(Argentina) A Collarini | 6 | 6
WC | (Peru) JP Varillas | 2 | 3
WC | (Peru) R Sánchez | 6^{2} | 7^{7} | 6
Q | (Peru) Sergio Monges | 7^{7} | 6^{2} | 4
Q | (Peru) M Echazú | 6 | 4 | 2
2 | (Argentina) G Pella | 4 | 6 | 6

Second round
(Brazil) R Hocevar | 6 | 6
(Argentina) P Heras | 1 | 4
(Chile) C Garin | 1 | 6 | 3
3 | (Spain) P Riba | 6 | 1 | 0^{r}
6 | (Argentina) F Bagnis | 6 | 7
(Argentina) A Collarini | 2 | 5
WC | (Peru) R Sánchez | 2 | 2
2 | (Argentina) G Pella | 6 | 6

Quarterfinals
(Brazil) R Hocevar | 7^{9} | 1 | 6
(Chile) C Garin | 6^{7} | 6 | 1
6 | (Argentina) F Bagnis | 7^{7} | 6
2 | (Argentina) G Pella | 6^{4} | 3

Semifinals
(Brazil) R Hocevar | 2 | 4
6 | (Argentina) F Bagnis | 6 | 6
