= 2013 Lima Challenger – Doubles =

Doubles
- 2013 Lima Challenger

Final
- Champions: (Argentina) Andrés Molteni (Brazil) Fernando Romboli
- Runners-up: (Brazil) Marcelo Demoliner (Peru) Sergio Galdós
- Score: 6–4, 6–4

Events
| Singles | Doubles |
| ← 2012 · | Lima Challenger | · 2014 → |

Facundo Argüello and Agustín Velotti were the defending champions but decided not to participate.
Andrés Molteni and Fernando Romboli defeated Marcelo Demoliner and Sergio Galdós 6–4, 6–4 in the final.

== Seeds ==
1. (Brazil) Marcelo Demoliner / (Peru) Sergio Galdós (final)
2. (Argentina) Martín Alund / (Argentina) Facundo Bagnis (quarterfinals)
3. (Argentina) Guido Andreozzi / (Peru) Duilio Beretta (quarterfinals)
4. (Chile) Jorge Aguilar / (Chile) Cristóbal Saavedra-Corvalán (quarterfinals)

== Draw ==
=== Key ===
- Q = Qualifier
- WC = Wild card
- LL = Lucky loser
- Alt = Alternate
- SE = Special exempt
- PR = Protected ranking
- ITF = ITF entry
- JE = Junior exempt
- w/o = Walkover
- r = Retired
- d = Defaulted
- SR = Special ranking

=== Draw ===
First round
(Chile) C Garin (Chile) N Jarry | w/o
WC | (Peru) Renzo Lau (Peru) Á Raposo de Oliveira
4 | (Chile) J Aguilar (Chile) C Saavedra-Corvalán | 6 | 6
(Peru) J Panta (Peru) JP Varillas | 2 | 2
(Brazil) A Ghem (Brazil) R Hocevar | 2 | 1
(Uruguay) A Behar (Canada) S Diez | 6 | 6
(Argentina) P Cachin (Peru) R Sánchez | 4 | 5
(Argentina) A Collarini (Argentina) G Pella | 6 | 7
(Peru) Sergio Monges (Peru) D Vallebuona | 2 | 1
3 | (Argentina) G Andreozzi (Peru) D Beretta | 6 | 6
(Peru) M Echazú (Argentina) P Heras | 3 | 2
(Argentina) A Molteni (Brazil) F Romboli | 6 | 6

Quarterfinals
1 | (Brazil) M Demoliner (Peru) S Galdós | 6 | 7
(Chile) C Garin (Chile) N Jarry | 2 | 5
4 | (Chile) J Aguilar (Chile) C Saavedra-Corvalán | 6 | 4 | [11]
(Uruguay) A Behar (Canada) S Diez | 3 | 6 | [13]
(Argentina) A Collarini (Argentina) G Pella | 3 | 6 | [10]
3 | (Argentina) G Andreozzi (Peru) D Beretta | 6 | 4 | 1
(Argentina) A Molteni (Brazil) F Romboli | 7^{7} | 5 | [10]
2 | (Argentina) M Alund (Argentina) F Bagnis | 6^{5} | 7 | 2

Semifinals
1 | (Brazil) M Demoliner (Peru) S Galdós | 6 | 6
(Uruguay) A Behar (Canada) S Diez | 4 | 3
(Argentina) A Collarini (Argentina) G Pella | 1 | 4
(Argentina) A Molteni (Brazil) F Romboli | 6 | 6

Final
1 | (Brazil) M Demoliner (Peru) S Galdós | 4 | 4
(Argentina) A Molteni (Brazil) F Romboli | 6 | 6
