= 2016 Lima Challenger – Doubles =

Doubles
- 2016 Lima Challenger

Final
- Champions: (Peru) Sergio Galdós (Argentina) Leonardo Mayer
- Runners-up: (Uruguay) Ariel Behar (Chile) Gonzalo Lama
- Score: 6–2, 7–6^{(9–7)}

Events
Singles	Doubles
← 2015 ·	Lima Challenger	· 2017 →

Andrej Martin and Hans Podlipnik were the defending champions but only Podlipnik chose to defend his title, partnering Andrés Molteni. Podlipnik lost in the first round to Mauricio Echazú and Michael Linzer.

Sergio Galdós and Leonardo Mayer won the title after defeating Ariel Behar and Gonzalo Lama 6–2, 7–6^{(9–7)} in the final.

== Seeds ==
1. (Argentina) Andrés Molteni / (Chile) Hans Podlipnik (first round)
2. (Peru) Sergio Galdós / (Argentina) Leonardo Mayer (champions)
3. (Portugal) Gastão Elias / (Brazil) Fabrício Neis (first round)
4. (Brazil) Fernando Romboli / (Brazil) Caio Zampieri (first round)

== Draw ==
=== Key ===
- Q = Qualifier
- WC = Wild card
- LL = Lucky loser
- Alt = Alternate
- SE = Special exempt
- PR = Protected ranking
- ITF = ITF entry
- JE = Junior exempt
- w/o = Walkover
- r = Retired
- d = Defaulted
- SR = Special ranking

First round
1	(Argentina) A Molteni (Chile) H Podlipnik	5	6	[8]
WC	(Peru) M Echazú (Austria) M Linzer	7	3	[10]
(Brazil) P Bernardi (Chile) N Jarry	4	6^{5}
(Brazil) D Dutra da Silva (Brazil) R Dutra Silva	6	7^{7}
4	(Brazil) F Romboli (Brazil) C Zampieri	1	0
(Uruguay) M Felder (Portugal) P Sousa	6	6
(Venezuela) LD Martínez (Argentina) A Velotti	2	3
(Uruguay) A Behar (Chile) G Lama	6	6
WC	(Peru) J Panta (Peru) JP Varillas	6	6
(Brazil) A Ghem (Brazil) E Russi Assumpção	2	4
PR	(Brazil) G Clezar (Brazil) F de Paula	6	6
3	(Portugal) G Elias (Brazil) F Neis	4	2
(Chile) C Garin (Spain) J Munar	3	4
(Belgium) A De Greef (Argentina) N Kicker	6	6
WC	(Argentina) G Andreozzi (Peru) D Beretta	3	6^{6}
2	(Peru) S Galdós (Argentina) L Mayer	6	7^{8}

Quarterfinals
WC	(Peru) M Echazú (Austria) M Linzer	w/o
(Brazil) D Dutra da Silva (Brazil) R Dutra Silva
(Uruguay) M Felder (Portugal) P Sousa
(Uruguay) A Behar (Chile) G Lama	w/o
WC	(Peru) J Panta (Peru) JP Varillas	3	5
PR	(Brazil) G Clezar (Brazil) F de Paula	6	7
(Belgium) A De Greef (Argentina) N Kicker	6^{3}	3
2	(Peru) S Galdós (Argentina) L Mayer	7^{7}	6

Semifinals
WC	(Peru) M Echazú (Austria) M Linzer	1	2
(Uruguay) A Behar (Chile) G Lama	6	6
PR	(Brazil) G Clezar (Brazil) F de Paula	4	6^{7}
2	(Peru) S Galdós (Argentina) L Mayer	6	7^{9}

Final
(Uruguay) A Behar (Chile) G Lama	2	6^{7}
2	(Peru) S Galdós (Argentina) L Mayer	6	7^{9}
