= 2014 Lima Challenger – Singles =

Singles
- 2014 Lima Challenger

Final
- Champion: (Argentina) Guido Pella
- Runner-up: (Australia) Jason Kubler
- Score: 6–2, 6–4

Events
Singles	Doubles
← 2013 ·	Lima Challenger	· 2015 →

Horacio Zeballos was the defending champion, but chose not to participate.

Guido Pella won the title, defeating Jason Kubler in the final, 6–2, 6–4.

== Seeds ==
1. (Italy) Paolo Lorenzi (first round)
2. (Argentina) Facundo Bagnis (first round)
3. (Australia) Jason Kubler (final)
4. (Spain) Roberto Carballés Baena (quarterfinals)
5. (Argentina) Guido Andreozzi (first round)
6. (Chile) Hans Podlipnik-Castillo (quarterfinals)
7. (Argentina) Juan Ignacio Londero (quarterfinals)
8. (Argentina) Guido Pella (champion)

== Draw ==
=== Key ===
- Q = Qualifier
- WC = Wild card
- LL = Lucky loser
- Alt = Alternate
- SE = Special exempt
- PR = Protected ranking
- ITF = ITF entry
- JE = Junior exempt
- w/o = Walkover
- r = Retired
- d = Defaulted
- SR = Special ranking

=== Finals ===
Semifinals
(Dominican Republic) José Hernández	3	2
3	(Australia) Jason Kubler	6	6
8	(Argentina) Guido Pella	7	4	6
(Chile) Juan Carlos Sáez	5	6	3

Finals
3	(Australia) Jason Kubler	2	4
8	(Argentina) Guido Pella	6	6

=== Top half ===
First round
1	(Italy) P Lorenzi	3	6	0
(Dominican Republic) J Hernández	6	1	6
Q	(Argentina) Alan Kohen	3	4
(Spain) D Muñoz de la Nava	6	6
(Brazil) F de Paula	6	6
WC	(Peru) R Sánchez	4	4
(Chile) C Garin	6^{4}	6	6
5	(Argentina) G Andreozzi	7^{7}	4	0
3	(Australia) J Kubler	7^{7}	1	6
(Poland) K Majchrzak	6^{3}	6	4
(Poland) G Panfil	6	6
WC	(Peru) JP Varillas	2	2
(South Africa) D O'Brien	2	3
Q	(Chile) G Rivera-Aránguiz	6	6
(Peru) M Echazú	6	2	2
7	(Argentina) JI Londero	4	6	6

Second round
(Dominican Republic) J Hernández	6	5
(Spain) D Muñoz de la Nava	1	2^{r}
(Brazil) F de Paula	6	6
(Chile) C Garin	3	3
3	(Australia) J Kubler	6	6
(Poland) G Panfil	4	4
Q	(Chile) G Rivera-Aránguiz	3	1
7	(Argentina) JI Londero	6	6

Quarterfinals
(Dominican Republic) J Hernández	6	7^{10}
(Brazil) F de Paula	2	6^{8}
3	(Australia) J Kubler	6	6
7	(Argentina) JI Londero	3	1

Semifinals
(Dominican Republic) J Hernández	3	2
3	(Australia) J Kubler	6	6

=== Bottom half ===
First round
8	(Argentina) G Pella	7^{14}	6^{4}	6
(Spain) R Ramírez Hidalgo	6^{12}	7^{7}	4
Q	(Peru) Edmundo Ulloa	0	0
(Argentina) M Alund	6	6
Q	(Austria) M Linzer	6	6
(Serbia) N Čačić	0	1
WC	(Peru) JB Panta	0	2
4	(Spain) R Carballés Baena	6	6
6	(Chile) H Podlipnik-Castillo	6	6
(Peru) D Beretta	3	4
WC	(Peru) S Galdós	3	3
(Croatia) T Androić	6	6
(Chile) JC Sáez	6	6
(El Salvador) M Arévalo	3	2
(Argentina) P Heras	2	6	7
2	(Argentina) F Bagnis	6	4	5

Second round
8	(Argentina) G Pella	6	6
(Argentina) M Alund	3	1
Q	(Austria) M Linzer	3	2
4	(Spain) R Carballés Baena	6	6
6	(Chile) H Podlipnik-Castillo	6	6
(Croatia) T Androić	2	3
(Chile) JC Sáez	6	6
(Argentina) P Heras	3	4

Quarterfinals
8	(Argentina) G Pella	3	7^{7}	6
4	(Spain) R Carballés Baena	6	6^{3}	4
6	(Chile) H Podlipnik-Castillo	3	1
(Chile) JC Sáez	6	6

Semifinals
8	(Argentina) G Pella	7	4	6
(Chile) JC Sáez	5	6	3
