= 2012 Lima Challenger – Doubles =

Doubles
- 2012 Lima Challenger

Final
- Champions: (Argentina) Facundo Argüello (Argentina) Agustín Velotti
- Runners-up: (Italy) Claudio Grassi (Italy) Luca Vanni
- Score: 7–6^{(7–4)}, 7–6^{(7–5)}

Events
Singles	Doubles
← 2011 ·	Lima Challenger	· 2013 →

Martín Alund and Juan-Martín Aranguren were the champions in 2009 but decided not to participate.
Facundo Argüello and Agustín Velotti won the final against Claudio Grassi and Luca Vanni 7–6^{(7–4)}, 7–6^{(7–5)}.

== Seeds ==
1. (Argentina) Guido Andreozzi / (Brazil) Fernando Romboli (first round)
2. (Chile) Jorge Aguilar / (Argentina) Andrés Molteni (quarterfinals)
3. (Italy) Claudio Grassi / (Italy) Luca Vanni (final)
4. (Argentina) Guillermo Durán / (Brazil) André Miele (first round)

== Draw ==
=== Key ===
- Q = Qualifier
- WC = Wild card
- LL = Lucky loser
- Alt = Alternate
- SE = Special exempt
- PR = Protected ranking
- ITF = ITF entry
- JE = Junior exempt
- w/o = Walkover
- r = Retired
- d = Defaulted
- SR = Special ranking

=== Draw ===
First round
1	(Argentina) G Andreozzi (Brazil) F Romboli	6	6^{5}	[10]
(United States) A Collarini (Uruguay) M Cuevas	4	7^{7}	[12]
WC	(Peru) Jorge Herreros (Peru) R Sánchez	3	2
(Argentina) F Argüello (Argentina) A Velotti	6	6
4	(Argentina) G Durán (Brazil) A Miele	3	4
(Brazil) M Demoliner (Argentina) R Olivo	6	6
(Chile) G Rivera-Aránguiz (Chile) C Saavedra-Corvalán	6	6
(Ecuador) I Endara (Brazil) L Kirche	4	2
(Italy) T Fabbiano (France) É Prodon	6^{5}	6	[10]
(Colombia) N Barrientos (Argentina) F Mena	7^{7}	3	[2]
WC	(Peru) M Echazú (Ecuador) R Quiroz	6^{4}	2
3	(Italy) C Grassi (Italy) L Vanni	7^{7}	6
(Peru) D Beretta (Peru) S Galdós	4	6	[6]
(Argentina) G Pella (Argentina) D Schwartzman	6	4	[10]
WC	(Peru) N Álvarez (Peru) Petr Iamachkine	2	2
2	(Chile) J Aguilar (Argentina) A Molteni	6	6

Quarterfinals
(United States) A Collarini (Uruguay) M Cuevas	4	4
(Argentina) F Argüello (Argentina) A Velotti	6	6
(Brazil) M Demoliner (Argentina) R Olivo	1	2
(Chile) G Rivera-Aránguiz (Chile) C Saavedra-Corvalán	6	6
(Italy) T Fabbiano (France) É Prodon	2	6	[2]
3	(Italy) C Grassi (Italy) L Vanni	6	3	[10]
(Argentina) G Pella (Argentina) D Schwartzman	6	6
2	(Chile) J Aguilar (Argentina) A Molteni	3	0

Semifinals
(Argentina) F Argüello (Argentina) A Velotti	4	6	[10]
(Chile) G Rivera-Aránguiz (Chile) C Saavedra-Corvalán	6	3	[2]
3	(Italy) C Grassi (Italy) L Vanni	6	6
(Argentina) G Pella (Argentina) D Schwartzman	3	4

Final
(Argentina) F Argüello (Argentina) A Velotti	7^{7}	7^{7}
3	(Italy) C Grassi (Italy) L Vanni	6^{4}	6^{5}
