= 2009 Lima Challenger – Doubles =

Doubles
- 2009 Lima Challenger

Final
- Champions: (Argentina) Martín Alund (Argentina) Juan-Martín Aranguren
- Runners-up: (Chile) Cristóbal Saavedra-Corvalán (Chile) Guillermo Rivera-Aránguiz
- Score: 6–4, 6–4

Events
Singles	Doubles
← 2008 ·	Lima Challenger	· 2010 →

Luis Horna and Sebastián Prieto were the defending champions, but they didn't compete this year.
Martín Alund and Juan-Martín Aranguren defeated Cristóbal Saavedra-Corvalán and Guillermo Rivera-Aránguiz 6–4, 6–4 in the final match.

== Seeds ==
1. (Brazil) Rogério Dutra da Silva / (Brazil) Júlio Silva (first round, withdrew)
2. (Argentina) Diego Álvarez / (Argentina) Juan-Pablo Amado (semifinals)
3. (Brazil) Marcelo Demoliner / (Brazil) João Souza (first round, withdrew)
4. (Argentina) Martín Alund / (Argentina) Juan-Martín Aranguren (champions)

== Draw ==
=== Key ===
- Q = Qualifier
- WC = Wild card
- LL = Lucky loser
- Alt = Alternate
- SE = Special exempt
- PR = Protected ranking
- ITF = ITF entry
- JE = Junior exempt
- w/o = Walkover
- r = Retired
- d = Defaulted
- SR = Special ranking

=== Draw ===
First round
1	(Brazil) R Dutra da Silva (Brazil) J Silva	w/o
(Peru) Francisco Carbajal (Peru) M Echazú
(Argentina) A Fabbri (Argentina) Leandro Migani	3	4
(Argentina) A Molteni (Argentina) Guido Pella	6	6
3	(Brazil) M Demoliner (Brazil) J Souza	w/o
WC	(Peru) D Beretta (Peru) S Galdós
WC	(Peru) Moises Cárdenas (Peru) I Miranda	1	1
(Chile) C Saavedra-Corvalán (Chile) G Rivera-Aránguiz	6	6
(Argentina) B Dabul (Argentina) G Etlis	6	6
(Chile) J Aguilar (Chile) G Hormazábal	4	3
(Chile) R Pérez (Chile) H Podlipnik	1	4
4	(Argentina) M Alund (Argentina) J-M Aranguren	6	6
WC	(Peru) Sergio Monges (Peru) R Sánchez	4	4
(Argentina) R Álvarez (Argentina) E Schwank	6	6
(Argentina) C Berlocq (Argentina) D Cristín	3	4
2	(Argentina) D Álvarez (Argentina) Juan-Pablo Amado	6	6

Quarterfinals
(Peru) F Carbajal (Peru) M Echazú	1	6	[8]
(Argentina) A Molteni (Argentina) G Pella	6	4	[10]
WC	(Peru) D Beretta (Peru) S Galdos	w/o
(Chile) C Saavedra-Corvalán (Chile) G Rivera-Aránguiz
(Argentina) B Dabul (Argentina) G Etlis	6^{4}	2
4	(Argentina) M Alund (Argentina) J-M Aranguren	7	6
(Argentina) R Álvarez (Argentina) E Schwank	4	4
2	(Argentina) D Álvarez (Argentina) J-P Amado	6	6

Semifinals
(Argentina) A Molteni (Argentina) G Pella	4	6	[5]
(Chile) C Saavedra-Corvalán (Chile) G Rivera-Aránguiz	6	3	[10]
4	(Argentina) M Alund (Argentina) J-M Aranguren	6	7
2	(Argentina) D Álvarez (Argentina) J-P Amado	1	6^{2}

Finals
(Chile) C Saavedra-Corvalán (Chile) G Rivera-Aránguiz	2	6^{4}
4	(Argentina) M Alund (Argentina) J-M Aranguren	6	7
