= 2012 Lima Challenger – Singles =

Singles
- 2012 Lima Challenger

Final
- Champion: (Argentina) Guido Andreozzi
- Runner-up: (Argentina) Facundo Argüello
- Score: 6–3, 6–7^{(6–8)}, 6–2

Events
Singles	Doubles
← 2011 ·	Lima Challenger	· 2013 →

Eduardo Schwank won the last edition in 2009.
Guido Andreozzi won the final 6–3, 6–7^{(6–8)}, 6–2 against Facundo Argüello.

== Seeds ==
1. (France) Éric Prodon (quarterfinals)
2. (Argentina) Diego Junqueira (quarterfinals)
3. (Argentina) Guido Pella (semifinals)
4. (Argentina) Agustín Velotti (semifinals)
5. (Argentina) Facundo Argüello (final)
6. (Italy) Thomas Fabbiano (second round)
7. (Brazil) Fernando Romboli (first round)
8. (Chile) Guillermo Rivera-Aránguiz (first round)

== Draw ==
=== Key ===
- Q = Qualifier
- WC = Wild card
- LL = Lucky loser
- Alt = Alternate
- SE = Special exempt
- PR = Protected ranking
- ITF = ITF entry
- JE = Junior exempt
- w/o = Walkover
- r = Retired
- d = Defaulted
- SR = Special ranking

=== Finals ===
Semifinals
(Argentina) Guido Andreozzi	6	6
3	(Argentina) Guido Pella	4	3
4	(Argentina) Agustín Velotti	2	3
5	(Argentina) Facundo Argüello	6	6

Final
(Argentina) Guido Andreozzi	6	6^{6}	6
5	(Argentina) Facundo Argüello	3	7^{8}	2

=== Top half ===
First round
1	(France) É Prodon	6	1	6
(Italy) L Vanni	2	6	3
(Chile) J Aguilar	2	0
(Peru) D Beretta	6	6
WC	(Peru) Jorge Herreros	3	1
(Brazil) M Demoliner	6	6
(Argentina) G Andreozzi	3	6	7
7	(Brazil) F Romboli	6	3	5
3	(Argentina) G Pella	6	6
WC	(Peru) S Galdós	3	1
Q	(Argentina) F Mena	3	1
(Chile) C Saavedra-Corvalán	6	6
(Brazil) A Miele	0	0
(Argentina) A Molteni	6	6
(United States) A Collarini	6	6
8	(Chile) G Rivera-Aránguiz	1	1

Second round
1	(France) É Prodon	2	6	6
(Peru) D Beretta	6	2	2
(Brazil) M Demoliner	2	4
(Argentina) G Andreozzi	6	6
3	(Argentina) G Pella	6	6
(Chile) C Saavedra-Corvalán	0	0
(Argentina) A Molteni	6^{5}	7^{7}	7
(United States) A Collarini	7^{7}	6^{4}	5

Quarterfinals
1	(France) É Prodon	3	6	2
(Argentina) G Andreozzi	6	2	6
3	(Argentina) G Pella	7^{7}	6
(Argentina) A Molteni	6^{4}	3

Semifinals
(Argentina) G Andreozzi	6	6
3	(Argentina) G Pella	4	3

=== Bottom half ===
First round
6	(Italy) T Fabbiano	6	6
Q	(Israel) Harel Srugo	4	1
(Colombia) N Barrientos	1	4
(Argentina) D Schwartzman	6	6
Q	(Ecuador) R Quiroz	2	7	2
(Argentina) R Olivo	6	5	6
WC	(Peru) R Sánchez	2	2
4	(Argentina) A Velotti	6	6
5	(Argentina) F Argüello	6	6
(Ecuador) I Endara	2	4
(Argentina) G Durán	1	6	7
Q	(Brazil) Ricardo Siggia	6	4	5
(Brazil) L Kirche	6	6
WC	(Peru) M Echazú	3	3
(Italy) C Grassi	3	2
2	(Argentina) D Junqueira	6	6

Second round
6	(Italy) T Fabbiano	4	2
(Argentina) D Schwartzman	6	6
(Argentina) R Olivo	2	4
4	(Argentina) A Velotti	6	6
5	(Argentina) F Argüello	6	6
(Argentina) G Durán	4	3
(Brazil) L Kirche	4	4
2	(Argentina) D Junqueira	6	6

Quarterfinals
(Argentina) D Schwartzman	6	3	2
4	(Argentina) A Velotti	3	6	6
5	(Argentina) F Argüello	6	2	7
2	(Argentina) D Junqueira	1	6	5

Semifinals
4	(Argentina) A Velotti	2	3
5	(Argentina) F Argüello	6	6
