= 2016 Lima Challenger – Singles =

Singles
- 2016 Lima Challenger

Final
- Champion: (Chile) Christian Garin
- Runner-up: (Argentina) Guido Andreozzi
- Score: 3–6, 7–5, 7–6^{(7–3)}

Events
Singles	Doubles
← 2015 ·	Lima Challenger	· 2017 →

Gastão Elias was the defending champion but lost in the first round to André Ghem.

Christian Garín won the title after defeating Guido Andreozzi 3–6, 7–5, 7–6^{(7–3)} in the final.

== Seeds ==
1. (Portugal) Gastão Elias (first round)
2. (Argentina) Facundo Bagnis (quarterfinals)
3. (Argentina) Horacio Zeballos (first round, retired)
4. (Argentina) Carlos Berlocq (quarterfinals, withdrew)
5. (Argentina) Renzo Olivo (second round)
6. (Brazil) Thiago Monteiro (withdrew)
7. (Brazil) Rogério Dutra Silva (semifinals)
8. (Argentina) Leonardo Mayer (quarterfinals)

== Draw ==
=== Key ===
- Q = Qualifier
- WC = Wild card
- LL = Lucky loser
- Alt = Alternate
- SE = Special exempt
- PR = Protected ranking
- ITF = ITF entry
- JE = Junior exempt
- w/o = Walkover
- r = Retired
- d = Defaulted
- SR = Special ranking

=== Finals ===
Semifinals
7	(Brazil) Rogério Dutra Silva	6	4	4
(Argentina) Guido Andreozzi	3	6	6
(Chile) Christian Garín	6	6
(Brazil) Guilherme Clezar	1	3

Final
(Argentina) Guido Andreozzi	6	5	6^{3}
(Chile) Christian Garín	3	7	7^{7}

=== Top half ===
First round
1/WC	(Portugal) G Elias	2	4
(Brazil) A Ghem	6	6
(Argentina) M González	6	6
WC	(Chile) N Jarry	4	1
(Portugal) P Sousa	6	4	0^{r}
Q	(Argentina) A Collarini	4	6	0
(Argentina) N Kicker	2	7^{7}	3
7	(Brazil) R Dutra Silva	6	6^{3}	6
3	(Argentina) H Zeballos	2	3^{r}
(Argentina) G Andreozzi	6	4
(Norway) C Ruud	6	6
LL	(Argentina) JI Londero	2	1
(Belgium) A De Greef	7	6
(Brazil) C Zampieri	5	1
(Spain) J Samper-Montaña	3	4
8	(Argentina) L Mayer	6	6

Second round
(Brazil) A Ghem	2	3
(Argentina) M González	6	6
Q	(Argentina) A Collarini	2	2
7	(Brazil) R Dutra Silva	6	6
(Argentina) G Andreozzi	6	3	6
(Norway) C Ruud	2	6	2
(Belgium) A De Greef	3	4
8	(Argentina) L Mayer	6	6

Quarterfinals
(Argentina) M González	7^{7}	6^{6}	4
7	(Brazil) R Dutra Silva	6^{4}	7^{8}	6
(Argentina) G Andreozzi	6	6
8	(Argentina) L Mayer	1	4

Semifinals
7	(Brazil) R Dutra Silva	6	4	4
(Argentina) G Andreozzi	3	6	6

=== Bottom half ===
First round
LL	(Austria) M Linzer	7	6
(Poland) K Majchrzak	5	4
WC	(Peru) JP Varillas	3	4
(Chile) C Garín	6	6
Q	(Chile) H Podlipnik	6	6
(Chile) G Lama	2	2
Q	(Brazil) JP Sorgi	1	1
4	(Argentina) C Berlocq	6	6
5	(Argentina) R Olivo	6	3	6
WC	(Peru) N Álvarez	4	6	1
(Ecuador) E Gómez	4	6^{5}
(Brazil) G Clezar	6	7^{7}
(France) M Bourgue	6	6
Q	(Argentina) F Mena	2	3
(Argentina) A Velotti	2	4
2	(Argentina) F Bagnis	6	6

Second round
LL	(Austria) M Linzer	4	3
(Chile) C Garín	6	6
Q	(Chile) H Podlipnik	3	7^{8}	6^{4}
4	(Argentina) C Berlocq	6	6^{6}	7^{7}
5	(Argentina) R Olivo	5	6	4
(Brazil) G Clezar	7	4	6
(France) M Bourgue	6^{6}	1
2	(Argentina) F Bagnis	7^{8}	6

Quarterfinals
(Chile) C Garín	w/o
4	(Argentina) C Berlocq
(Brazil) G Clezar	7^{7}	7^{7}
2	(Argentina) F Bagnis	6^{0}	6^{5}

Semifinals
(Chile) C Garin	6	6
(Brazil) G Clezar	1	3
