= 2009 Lima Challenger – Singles =

Singles
- 2009 Lima Challenger

Final
- Champion: (Argentina) Eduardo Schwank
- Runner-up: (Chile) Jorge Aguilar
- Score: 7–5, 6–4

Events
Singles	Doubles
← 2008 ·	Lima Challenger	· 2010 →

Martín Vassallo Argüello was the defending champion; however, he chose to not defend this 2009 title.
1st seed Eduardo Schwank won in the final match 7–5, 6–4, against Jorge Aguilar.

== Seeds ==
1. (Argentina) Eduardo Schwank (champion)
2. (Brazil) Júlio Silva (first round)
3. (Brazil) João Souza (first round)
4. (Argentina) Gastón Gaudio (first round)
5. (Argentina) Brian Dabul (semifinals)
6. (Argentina) Diego Junqueira (quarterfinals)
7. (Argentina) Juan-Martín Aranguren (first round)
8. (Chile) Jorge Aguilar (semifinals)

== Draw ==
=== Key ===
- Q = Qualifier
- WC = Wild card
- LL = Lucky loser
- Alt = Alternate
- SE = Special exempt
- PR = Protected ranking
- ITF = ITF entry
- JE = Junior exempt
- w/o = Walkover
- r = Retired
- d = Defaulted
- SR = Special ranking

=== Finals ===
Semifinals
1	(Argentina) Eduardo Schwank	6	6
5	(Argentina) Brian Dabul	2	4
Q	(Chile) Cristóbal Saavedra-Corvalán	6	3	3
8	(Chile) Jorge Aguilar	2	6	6

Final
1	(Argentina) Eduardo Schwank	7	6
8	(Chile) Jorge Aguilar	5	4

=== Top half ===
First round
1	(Argentina) E Schwank	6	6
(Argentina) JP Amado	4	3
Q	(Argentina) D Cristín	6^{2}	6	6
Q	(Chile) H Podlipnik-Castillo	7	1	4
(Argentina) D Álvarez	6	6
(Argentina) L Migani	4	0
(Chile) G Hormazábal	7	3	6^{1}
6	(Argentina) D Junqueira	6^{5}	6	7
3	(Brazil) J Souza	3	0
(Argentina) M Puerta	6	6
WC	(Peru) I Miranda	7	6
WC	(Peru) S Galdós	6^{2}	3
(Brazil) R Dutra da Silva	1	5
(Argentina) A Molteni	6	7
(Argentina) A Dellatorre	2	0
5	(Argentina) B Dabul	6	6

Second round
1	(Argentina) E Schwank	6	6
Q	(Argentina) D Cristín	3	2
(Argentina) D Álvarez	6	0	3
6	(Argentina) D Junqueira	0	6	6
(Argentina) M Puerta	w/o
WC	(Peru) I Miranda
(Argentina) A Molteni	2	6^{6}
5	(Argentina) B Dabul	6	7

Quarterfinals
1	(Argentina) E Schwank	6	6
6	(Argentina) D Junqueira	4	0
WC	(Peru) I Miranda	2	4
5	(Argentina) B Dabul	6	6

Semifinals
1	(Argentina) E Schwank	6	6
5	(Argentina) B Dabul	2	4

=== Bottom half ===
First round
7	(Argentina) J-M Aranguren	2	4
(Argentina) M Alund	6	6
Q	(Chile) G Rivera-Aranguiz	6	6^{4}	7
(Argentina) A Fabbri	3	7	5
WC	(Peru) D Beretta	6	6
WC	(Peru) F Carbajal	2	1
Q	(Chile) C Saavedra-Corvalán	6	7
4	(Argentina) G Gaudio	2	5
8	(Chile) J Aguilar	2	6	6
(Serbia) F Krajinović	6	2	1
(Brazil) M Demoliner	6	6^{5}	6^{4}
(Peru) L Horna	3	7	7
(Argentina) C Berlocq	6	3	6
(Argentina) G Pella	3	6	3
(Argentina) M Zabaleta	6	6
2	(Brazil) J Silva	3	1

Second round
(Argentina) M Alund	6	6
Q	(Chile) G Rivera-Aránguiz	2	3
WC	(Peru) D Beretta	1	3
Q	(Chile) C Saavedra-Corvalán	6	6
8	(Chile) J Aguilar	3	6	6
(Peru) L Horna	6	2	3
(Argentina) C Berlocq	4
(Argentina) M Zabaleta	1	r

Quarterfinals
(Argentina) M Alund	6	4	2
Q	(Chile) C Saavedra-Corvalán	3	6	6
8	(Chile) J Aguilar	6	4	6
(Argentina) C Berlocq	4	6	4

Semifinals
Q	(Chile) C Saavedra-Corvalán	6	3	3
8	(Chile) J Aguilar	2	6	6
