= 2014 Lima Challenger =

- Date: 15 November – 23 November
- Edition: 8th
- Surface: Clay
- Location: Lima, Peru

Champions

Singles
- (Argentina) Guido Pella

Doubles
- (Peru) Sergio Galdós / (Argentina) Guido Pella
← 2013 ·	Lima Challenger	· 2015 →

The 2014 Lima Challenger was a professional tennis tournament played on clay courts. It was the eighth edition of the tournament which is part of the 2014 ATP Challenger Tour. It took place in Lima, Peru between November 15 and November 23, 2014.

== Singles main-draw entrants ==
=== Seeds ===
Country	Player	Rank^{1}	Seed
ITA	Paolo Lorenzi	69	1
ARG	Facundo Bagnis	115	2
AUS	Jason Kubler	153	3
ESP	Roberto Carballés Baena	178	4
ARG	Guido Andreozzi	187	5
CHI	Hans Podlipnik Castillo	204	6
ARG	Juan Ignacio Londero	208	7
ARG	Guido Pella	214	8

- ^{1} Rankings are as of November 10, 2014.

=== Other entrants ===
The following players received wildcards into the singles main draw:

- (Peru) Sergio Galdós
- (Peru) Jorge Brian Panta
- (Peru) Rodrigo Sánchez
- (Peru) Juan Pablo Varillas

The following players received entry from the qualifying draw:

- (Argentina) Alan Kohen
- (Austria) Michael Linzer
- (Chile) Guillermo Rivera Aránguiz
- (Peru) Edmundo Ulloa

== Champions ==
=== Singles ===
- (Argentina) Guido Pella def. (Australia) Jason Kubler, 6–2, 6–4

=== Doubles ===
- (Peru) Sergio Galdós / (Argentina) Guido Pella def. (Brazil) Marcelo Demoliner / (Venezuela) Roberto Maytín, 6–3, 6–1
