= 2013 Lima Challenger =

- Date: 11–17 November
- Edition: 7th
- Surface: Clay
- Location: Lima, Peru

Champions

Singles
- (Argentina) Horacio Zeballos

Doubles
- (Argentina) Andrés Molteni / (Brazil) Fernando Romboli
← 2012 ·	Lima Challenger	· 2014 →

The 2013 Lima Challenger was a professional tennis tournament played on clay courts. It was the seventh edition of the tournament which was part of the 2013 ATP Challenger Tour. It took place in Lima, Peru between 11 and 17 November 2013.

== Singles main-draw entrants ==
=== Seeds ===
Country	Player	Rank^{1}	Seed
ARG	Horacio Zeballos	58	1
ARG	Guido Pella	94	2
ESP	Pere Riba	127	3
ARG	Martín Alund	130	4
ARG	Facundo Argüello	135	5
ARG	Facundo Bagnis	140	6
ARG	Guido Andreozzi	143	7
BRA	Thomaz Bellucci	147	8

- ^{1} Rankings are as of November 4, 2013.

=== Other entrants ===
The following players received wildcards into the singles main draw:

- (Peru) Sergio Galdós
- (Peru) Jorge Panta
- (Peru) Rodrigo Sánchez
- (Peru) Juan Pablo Varillas

The following players received entry from the qualifying draw:

- (Argentina) Pedro Cachin
- (Peru) Mauricio Echazú
- (Peru) Sergio Monges
- (Chile) Cristóbal Saavedra-Corvalán

== Champions ==
=== Singles ===
- (Argentina) Horacio Zeballos def. (Argentina) Facundo Bagnis 6–7^{(4–7)}, 6–3, 6–3

=== Doubles ===
- (Argentina) Andrés Molteni / (Brazil) Fernando Romboli def. (Brazil) Marcelo Demoliner / (Peru) Sergio Galdós 6–4, 6–4
