= 2018 Lima Challenger – Singles =

Singles
- 2018 Lima Challenger

Final
- Champion: (Chile) Christian Garín
- Runner-up: (Portugal) Pedro Sousa
- Score: 6–4, 6–4

Events
Singles	Doubles
← 2017 ·	Lima Challenger	· 2019 →

Gerald Melzer was the defending champion but lost in the first round to Paolo Lorenzi.

Christian Garín won the title after defeating Pedro Sousa 6–4, 6–4 in the final.

== Seeds ==
1. (Uruguay) Pablo Cuevas (first round)
2. (Argentina) Federico Delbonis (quarterfinals, withdrew)
3. (Argentina) Guido Andreozzi (second round)
4. (Chile) Christian Garín (champion)
5. (Spain) Pablo Andújar (second round)
6. (Brazil) Thiago Monteiro (semifinals)
7. (Italy) Paolo Lorenzi (second round)
8. (Bolivia) Hugo Dellien (quarterfinals)

== Draw ==
=== Key ===
- Q = Qualifier
- WC = Wild card
- LL = Lucky loser
- Alt = Alternate
- SE = Special exempt
- PR = Protected ranking
- ITF = ITF entry
- JE = Junior exempt
- w/o = Walkover
- r = Retired
- d = Defaulted
- SR = Special ranking

=== Finals ===
Semifinals
(Portugal) Pedro Sousa	7^{8}	6
(Argentina) Facundo Argüello	6^{6}	3
4	(Chile) Christian Garín	3	6	6
6	(Brazil) Thiago Monteiro	6	4	4

Final
(Portugal) Pedro Sousa	4	4
4	(Chile) Christian Garín	6	6

=== Top half ===
First round
1	(Uruguay) P Cuevas	6^{6}	4
(Portugal) J Domingues	7^{8}	6
(Belgium) A De Greef	3	3
(Portugal) P Sousa	6	6
(Portugal) G Elias	1	6^{5}
(Argentina) JI Londero	6	7^{7}
(Dominican Republic) R Cid Subervi	3	3
5	(Spain) P Andújar	6	6
3	(Argentina) G Andreozzi	4	6	1
(Brazil) R Dutra Silva	6	1	0^{r}
(Brazil) T Bellucci	6	6^{5}	4
(Dominican Republic) J Hernández-Fernández	1	7^{7}	6
WC	(Peru) JP Varillas	4	1
(Argentina) F Argüello	6	6
(Austria) G Melzer	6^{2}	6^{3}
7	(Italy) P Lorenzi	7^{7}	7^{7}

Second round
(Portugal) J Domingues	3	6	4
(Portugal) P Sousa	6	3	6
(Argentina) JI Londero	6	6
5	(Spain) P Andújar	4	2
3	(Argentina) G Andreozzi	2	6^{4}
(Dominican Republic) J Hernández-Fernández	6	7^{7}
(Argentina) F Argüello	6	7^{13}
7	(Italy) P Lorenzi	4	6^{11}

Quarterfinals
(Portugal) P Sousa	6	6
(Argentina) JI Londero	0	3
(Dominican Republic) J Hernández-Fernández	1	2
(Argentina) F Argüello	6	6

Semifinals
(Portugal) P Sousa	7^{8}	6
(Argentina) F Argüello	6^{6}	3

=== Bottom half ===
First round
8	(Bolivia) H Dellien	6	7
Alt	(Serbia) M Zekić	4	5
(Argentina) F Bagnis	3	3
Q	(Argentina) A Collarini	6	6
(Brazil) G Clezar	6	6
WC	(Japan) Kento Tagashira	0	0
Q	(Argentina) R Olivo	6	1	2
4	(Chile) C Garín	4	6	6
6	(Brazil) T Monteiro	1	6	7
PR	(Colombia) S Giraldo	6	2	5
Q	(Colombia) C Rodríguez	4	6	3
Q	(Chile) MT Barrios Vera	6	3	6
WC	(Ecuador) E Gómez	6	6
WC	(Peru) N Álvarez	4	4
(Serbia) P Krstin	2	2
2	(Argentina) F Delbonis	6	6

Second round
8	(Bolivia) H Dellien	0	7^{7}	6
Q	(Argentina) A Collarini	6	6^{4}	3
(Brazil) G Clezar	3	3
4	(Chile) C Garín	6	6
6	(Brazil) T Monteiro	w/o
Q	(Chile) MT Barrios Vera
WC	(Ecuador) E Gómez	2	1
2	(Argentina) F Delbonis	6	6

Quarterfinals
8	(Bolivia) H Dellien	6	4	4
4	(Chile) C Garín	2	6	6
6	(Brazil) T Monteiro	w/o
2	(Argentina) F Delbonis

Semifinals
4	(Chile) C Garín	3	6	6
6	(Brazil) T Monteiro	6	4	4
