= 2015 Lima Challenger – Singles =

Singles
- 2015 Lima Challenger

Final
- Champion: (Portugal) Gastão Elias
- Runner-up: (Slovakia) Andrej Martin
- Score: 6–2, 7–6^{(7–4)}

Events
Singles	Doubles
← 2014 ·	Lima Challenger	· 2016 →

Gastão Elias won the title, beating Andrej Martin 6–2, 7–6^{(7–4)}

== Seeds ==
1. (Bosnia and Herzegovina) Damir Džumhur (first round)
2. (Argentina) Guido Pella (semifinals)
3. (Colombia) Alejandro González (quarterfinals)
4. (Belgium) Kimmer Coppejans (second round)
5. (Argentina) Facundo Argüello (first round)
6. (Argentina) Máximo González (second round)
7. (Argentina) Carlos Berlocq (quarterfinals, retired)
8. (Brazil) João Souza (first round)

== Draw ==
=== Key ===
- Q = Qualifier
- WC = Wild card
- LL = Lucky loser
- Alt = Alternate
- SE = Special exempt
- PR = Protected ranking
- ITF = ITF entry
- JE = Junior exempt
- w/o = Walkover
- r = Retired
- d = Defaulted
- SR = Special ranking

=== Finals ===
Semifinals
(Slovakia) Andrej Martin	2	7^{7}	7
(Dominican Republic) José Hernández	6	6^{4}	5
(Portugal) Gastão Elias	7	6
2	(Argentina) Guido Pella	5	2

Final
(Slovakia) Andrej Martin	2	6^{4}
(Portugal) Gastão Elias	6	7^{7}

=== Top half ===
First round
1	(Bosnia and Herzegovina) D Džumhur	2	4
(Chile) H Podlipnik	6	6
WC	(Peru) JP Varillas	1	3
(Slovakia) A Martin	6	6
WC	(Ecuador) E Gómez	7^{7}	6
WC	(Peru) N Álvarez	6^{3}	4
(Sweden) C Lindell	3	3
6	(Argentina) M González	6	6
3	(Colombia) A González	7	6
(Brazil) A Ghem	5	4
(Argentina) R Olivo	6	4	4
(Brazil) G Clezar	3	6	6
(France) M Bourgue	4	4
(Austria) D Novak	6	6
(Dominican Republic) J Hernández	7^{7}	7^{7}
8	(Brazil) J Souza	6^{3}	6^{3}

Second round
(Chile) H Podlipnik	7^{7}	4	4
(Slovakia) A Martin	6^{5}	6	6
WC	(Ecuador) E Gómez	1	6	7
6	(Argentina) M González	6	4	5
3	(Colombia) A González	6^{6}	6	0
(Brazil) G Clezar	7^{8}	3	0r
(Austria) D Novak	6	2	1
(Dominican Republic) J Hernández	3	6	6

Quarterfinals
(Slovakia) A Martin	6	6
WC	(Ecuador) E Gómez	2	1
3	(Colombia) A González	2	4
(Dominican Republic) J Hernández	6	6

Semifinals
(Slovakia) A Martin	2	7^{7}	7
(Dominican Republic) J Hernández	6	6^{4}	5

=== Bottom half ===
First round
5	(Argentina) F Argüello	6	4	4
(Portugal) G Elias	2	6	6
Q	(Chile) C Garin	4	2
Q	(Argentina) JI Londero	6	6
(Brazil) R Dutra Silva	6	6
(Italy) R Bellotti	2	4
WC	(Peru) M Echazú	1	4
4	(Belgium) K Coppejans	6	6
7	(Argentina) C Berlocq	6	6
(Argentina) M Trungelliti	3	1
(Argentina) H Zeballos	6	6
Q	(Austria) M Linzer	3	4
Q	(Bolivia) H Dellien	7	7^{7}
(Argentina) P Cachin	5	6^{2}
(Chile) JC Sáez	2	4
2	(Argentina) G Pella	6	6

Second round
(Portugal) G Elias	6	6
Q	(Argentina) JI Londero	3	1
(Brazil) R Dutra Silva	7	7
4	(Belgium) K Coppejans	5	5
7	(Argentina) C Berlocq	7^{7}	7^{7}
(Argentina) H Zeballos	6^{3}	6^{3}
Q	(Bolivia) H Dellien	5	6^{6}
2	(Argentina) G Pella	7	7^{8}

Quarterfinals
(Portugal) G Elias	7^{7}	6
(Brazil) R Dutra Silva	6^{3}	5
7	(Argentina) C Berlocq	3	1^{r}
2	(Argentina) G Pella	6	1

Semifinals
(Portugal) G Elias	7	6
2	(Argentina) G Pella	5	2
