= 2016 Lima Challenger =

- Date: 24 October – 30 October
- Edition: 10th
- Surface: Clay
- Location: Lima, Peru

Champions

Singles
- (Chile) Cristian Garín

Doubles
- (Peru) Sergio Galdós / (Argentina) Leonardo Mayer
← 2015 ·	Lima Challenger	· 2017 →

The 2016 Lima Challenger is a professional tennis tournament played on clay courts. It is the tenth edition of the tournament which is part of the 2016 ATP Challenger Tour. It takes place in Lima, Peru between October 24 and October 30, 2016.

== Singles main-draw entrants ==
=== Seeds ===
Country	Player	Rank^{1}	Seed
POR	Gastão Elias	61	1
ARG	Facundo Bagnis	66	2
ARG	Horacio Zeballos	72	3
ARG	Carlos Berlocq	83	4
ARG	Renzo Olivo	87	5
BRA	~~Thiago Monteiro~~	~~88~~	~~6~~
BRA	Rogério Dutra Silva	107	7
ARG	Leonardo Mayer	126	8

- ^{1} Rankings are as of October 17, 2016.

=== Other entrants ===
The following players received wildcards into the singles main draw:

- (Peru) Nicolás Álvarez
- (Portugal) Gastão Elias
- (Chile) Nicolás Jarry
- (Peru) Juan Pablo Varillas

The following players received entry from the qualifying draw:

- (Argentina) Andrea Collarini
- (Argentina) Facundo Mena
- (Chile) Hans Podlipnik
- (Brazil) João Pedro Sorgi

The following players entered as lucky losers:

- (Austria) Michael Linzer
- (Argentina) Juan Ignacio Londero

== Champions ==
=== Singles ===
- (Chile) Christian Garín def. (Argentina) Guido Andreozzi, 3–6, 7–5, 7–6^{(7–3)}.

=== Doubles ===
- (Peru) Sergio Galdós / (Argentina) Leonardo Mayer def. (Uruguay) Ariel Behar / (Chile) Gonzalo Lama, 6–2, 7–6^{(9–7)}.
