= 2012 Lima Challenger =

- Date: 2 – 8 July
- Edition: 6th
- Surface: Clay
- Location: Lima, Peru

Champions

Singles
- (Argentina) Guido Andreozzi

Doubles
- (Argentina) Facundo Argüello / (Argentina) Agustín Velotti
← 2009 ·	Lima Challenger	· 2013 →

The 2012 Lima Challenger was a professional tennis tournament played on clay courts. It was the sixth edition of the tournament which was part of the 2012 ATP Challenger Tour. It took place in Lima, Peru between 2 and 8 July 2012.

== Singles main draw entrants ==
=== Seeds ===
Country	Player	Rank^{1}	Seed
FRA	Éric Prodon	121	1
ARG	Diego Junqueira	178	2
ARG	Guido Pella	205	3
ARG	Agustín Velotti	230	4
ARG	Facundo Argüello	237	5
ITA	Thomas Fabbiano	249	6
BRA	Fernando Romboli	275	7
CHI	Guillermo Rivera Aránguiz	284	8

- ^{1} Rankings are as of June 25, 2012.

=== Other entrants ===
The following players received wildcards into the singles main draw:

- (Peru) Mauricio Echazú
- (Peru) Sergio Galdós
- (Peru) Jorge Herreros
- (Peru) Rodrigo Sánchez

The following players received entry from the qualifying draw:

- (Argentina) Facundo Mena
- (Ecuador) Roberto Quiroz
- (Brazil) Ricardo Siggia
- (Israel) Harel Srugo

== Champions ==
=== Singles ===
- (Argentina) Guido Andreozzi def. (Argentina) Facundo Argüello, 6–3, 6–7^{(6–8)}, 6–2

=== Doubles ===
- (Argentina) Facundo Argüello / (Argentina) Agustín Velotti def. (Italy) Claudio Grassi / (Italy) Luca Vanni, 7–6^{(7–4)}, 7–6^{(7–5)}
