= 2025 Lima Challenger II – Singles =

Singles
- 2025 Lima Challenger II

Final
- Champion: (Chile) Tomás Barrios Vera
- Runner-up: (Brazil) João Lucas Reis da Silva
- Score: 7–6^{(7–5)}, 7–6^{(7–3)}

Events
Singles	Doubles
← 2025 ·	Lima Challenger	· 2026 →

Juan Carlos Prado Ángelo was the defending champion but lost in the first round to Juan Bautista Torres.

Tomás Barrios Vera won the title after defeating João Lucas Reis da Silva 7–6^{(7–5)}, 7–6^{(7–3)} in the final.

The quarterfinal match between Torres and Barrios Vera, which lasted 4 hours and 24 minutes, became the longest three-set ATP Challenger Tour match in history, and broke a 14-year-old record (since 2011 Barranquilla).

== Seeds ==
1. (Argentina) Mariano Navone (first round)
2. (Spain) Carlos Taberner (first round)
3. (Chile) Cristian Garín (quarterfinals)
4. (Argentina) Román Andrés Burruchaga (quarterfinals)
5. (Peru) Ignacio Buse (second round)
6. (Chile) Tomás Barrios Vera (champion)
7. (Lithuania) Vilius Gaubas (first round)
8. (United States) Tristan Boyer (first round)

== Draw ==
Key

- Q = Qualifier
- WC = Wild card
- LL = Lucky loser
- Alt = Alternate
- ITF = ITF entry
- PR = Protected ranking
- SR = Special ranking
- SE = Special exempt
- JE = Junior exempt
- JR = Junior Accelerator Programme entrant
- CO = College Accelerator Programme entrant
- NG = Next Gen Accelerator Program entrant
- w/o = Walkover
- r = Retired
- d = Defaulted

=== Finals ===
Semifinals
6	(Chile) Tomás Barrios Vera	6	7
(Ecuador) Álvaro Guillén Meza	2	5
(Peru) Gonzalo Bueno	4	3
(Brazil) João Lucas Reis da Silva	6	6

Final
6	(Chile) Tomás Barrios Vera	7^{7}	7^{7}
(Brazil) João Lucas Reis da Silva	6^{5}	6^{3}

=== Top half ===
First round
1	(Argentina) M Navone	2	6^{5}
Q	(Bolivia) M Dellien	6	7^{7}
Q	(Argentina) JB Torres	7^{7}	6
(Bolivia) JC Prado Ángelo	6^{2}	3
(Lebanon) H Habib	7^{7}	7^{7}
(Paraguay) AD Vallejo	6^{2}	6^{5}
(Czech Republic) Z Kolář	5	3
6	(Chile) T Barrios Vera	7	6
4	(Argentina) RA Burruchaga	2	6	6
Alt	(Italy) M Cecchinato	6	0	3
(Argentina) FA Gómez	6^{5}	6	6^{3}
WC	(Peru) JP Varillas	7^{7}	3	7^{7}
Q	(Argentina) M Kestelboim	3	2
Q	(Argentina) N Kicker	6	6
(Ecuador) Á Guillén Meza	1	6	6
8	(United States) T Boyer	6	2	4

Second round
Q	(Bolivia) M Dellien	6	1	2
Q	(Argentina) JB Torres	4	6	6
(Lebanon) H Habib	5	6	4
6	(Chile) T Barrios Vera	7	3	6
4	(Argentina) RA Burruchaga	6	6
WC	(Peru) JP Varillas	2	3
Q	(Argentina) N Kicker	6	5	4
(Ecuador) Á Guillén Meza	4	7	6

Quarterfinals
Q	(Argentina) JB Torres	6^{2}	7^{8}	6^{10}
6	(Chile) T Barrios Vera	7^{7}	6^{6}	7^{12}
4	(Argentina) RA Burruchaga	7^{10}	2	5
(Ecuador) Á Guillén Meza	6^{8}	6	7

Semifinals
6	(Chile) T Barrios Vera	6	7
(Ecuador) Á Guillén Meza	2	5

=== Bottom half ===
First round
7	(Lithuania) V Gaubas	4	3
(Peru) G Bueno	6	6
Q	(Uruguay) F Roncadelli	4	4
(Argentina) A Barrena	6	6
Alt	I Gakhov	6	4	6
WC	(Peru) A Huertas del Pino	3	6	3
(Kazakhstan) T Skatov	1	2
3/WC	(Chile) C Garín	6	6
5	(Peru) I Buse	6^{2}	6	6
JR	(Colombia) Miguel Tobón	7^{7}	4	3
(Brazil) JL Reis da Silva	7^{7}	6
(Argentina) L Midón	6^{4}	3
Q	(Argentina) G Villanueva	6	6
(Mexico) R Pacheco Méndez	3	4
(Argentina) GA Olivieri	2	7	6
2	(Spain) C Taberner	6	5	4

Second round
(Peru) G Bueno	6	1	7^{9}
(Argentina) A Barrena	3	6	6^{7}
Alt	I Gakhov	3	3
3/WC	(Chile) C Garín	6	6
5	(Peru) I Buse	3	3
(Brazil) JL Reis da Silva	6	6
Q	(Argentina) G Villanueva	4	7	3
(Argentina) GA Olivieri	6	5	6

Quarterfinals
(Peru) G Bueno	7	2	6
3/WC	(Chile) C Garín	5	6	4
(Brazil) JL Reis da Silva	6	6
(Argentina) GA Olivieri	3	4

Semifinals
(Peru) G Bueno	4	3
(Brazil) JL Reis da Silva	6	6
