= 2018 Lima Challenger – Doubles =

Doubles
- 2018 Lima Challenger

Final
- Champions: (Argentina) Guido Andreozzi; (Argentina) Guillermo Durán
- Runners-up: (Uruguay) Ariel Behar; (Ecuador) Gonzalo Escobar
- Score: 2–6, 7–6^{(7–5)}, [10–5]

Events
Singles	Doubles
- Lima Challenger

Miguel Ángel Reyes-Varela and Blaž Rola were the defending champions but chose not to defend their title.

Guido Andreozzi and Guillermo Durán won the title after defeating Ariel Behar and Gonzalo Escobar 2–6, 7–6^{(7–5)}, [10–5] in the final.

== Seeds ==
1. (Argentina) Andrés Molteni / (Brazil) Fernando Romboli (quarterfinals)
2. (Uruguay) Martín Cuevas / (Uruguay) Pablo Cuevas (quarterfinals)
3. (Uruguay) Ariel Behar / (Ecuador) Gonzalo Escobar (final)
4. (Argentina) Guido Andreozzi / (Argentina) Guillermo Durán (champions)

== Draw ==
Key

- Q = Qualifier
- WC = Wild card
- LL = Lucky loser
- Alt = Alternate
- ITF = ITF entry
- PR = Protected ranking
- SR = Special ranking
- SE = Special exempt
- JE = Junior exempt
- JR = Junior Accelerator Programme entrant
- CO = College Accelerator Programme entrant
- NG = Next Gen Accelerator Program entrant
- w/o = Walkover
- r = Retired
- d = Defaulted

First round

Quarterfinals

Semifinals

Final

1
- (Argentina) A Molteni
- (Brazil) F Romboli
6
6

Alt
- (Brazil) P Sakamoto
- (Brazil) T Seyboth Wild
4
2

1
- (Argentina) A Molteni
- (Brazil) F Romboli
1
4

(Bolivia) F Zeballos
(Argentina) Matías Zukas
1
6
[13]

(Bolivia) F Zeballos
(Argentina) M Zukas
6
6

WC
- (Peru) M Echazú
- (United States) JA Ore
6
4
[11]

(Bolivia) F Zeballos
(Argentina) M Zukas
6
2
[7]

4
- (Argentina) G Andreozzi
- (Argentina) G Durán
6
6

4
- (Argentina) G Andreozzi
- (Argentina) G Durán
4
6
[10]

WC
- (Peru) N Álvarez
- (Peru) JP Varillas
2
1

4
- (Argentina) G Andreozzi
- (Argentina) G Durán
6
6

- (Dominican Republic) J Hernández-Fernández
- (Brazil) O Luz
4
2

- (Argentina) T Lipovšek Puches
- (Argentina) JI Londero
2
2

- (Argentina) T Lipovšek Puches
- (Argentina) JI Londero
6
6

4
- (Argentina) G Andreozzi
- (Argentina) G Durán
2
7^{7}
[10]

WC
- (Peru) A Huertas del Pino
- (Peru) C Huertas del Pino
4
0

3
- (Uruguay) A Behar
- (Ecuador) G Escobar
6
6^{5}
[5]

- (Argentina) F Agamenone
- (Argentina) F Argüello
6
6

- (Argentina) F Agamenone
- (Argentina) F Argüello
4
6
[5]

Alt
- (Argentina) A Collarini
- (Argentina) F Coria
6^{4}
0

3
- (Uruguay) A Behar
- (Ecuador) G Escobar
6
4
[10]

3
- (Uruguay) A Behar
- (Ecuador) G Escobar
7^{7}
6

3
- (Uruguay) A Behar
- (Ecuador) G Escobar
7^{7}
4
[10]

- (Serbia) P Krstin
- (Serbia) M Zekić
6^{1}
2

- (Portugal) P Sousa
- (Netherlands) M Vervoort
6^{3}
6
[7]

- (Portugal) P Sousa
- (Netherlands) M Vervoort
7^{7}
6

- (Portugal) P Sousa
- (Netherlands) M Vervoort
7
1
[12]

- (Argentina) F Bagnis
- (Peru) S Galdós
4
4

2
- (Uruguay) M Cuevas
- (Uruguay) P Cuevas
5
6
[10]

2
- (Uruguay) M Cuevas
- (Uruguay) P Cuevas
6
6
