= 2021 Lima Challenger – Singles =

Tennis tournament

Singles
- 2021 Lima Challenger

Final
- Champion: (Bolivia) Hugo Dellien
- Runner-up: (Argentina) Camilo Ugo Carabelli
- Score: 6–3, 7–5

Events
Singles	Doubles
← 2020 ·	Lima Challenger	· 2021 →

Daniel Elahi Galán was the defending champion, but chose not to defend his title.

Hugo Dellien won the title after defeating Camilo Ugo Carabelli 6–3, 7–5 in the final.

== Seeds ==
1. (Argentina) Francisco Cerúndolo (first round)
2. (Argentina) Juan Manuel Cerúndolo (quarterfinals, retired)
3. (Germany) Daniel Altmaier (second round)
4. (Peru) Juan Pablo Varillas (second round)
5. (Bolivia) Hugo Dellien (champion)
6. (Argentina) Renzo Olivo (quarterfinals)
7. (Argentina) Juan Pablo Ficovich (first round)
8. (Argentina) Camilo Ugo Carabelli (final)

== Draw ==
=== Key ===
- Q = Qualifier
- WC = Wild card
- LL = Lucky loser
- Alt = Alternate
- SE = Special exempt
- PR = Protected ranking
- ITF = ITF entry
- JE = Junior exempt
- w/o = Walkover
- r = Retired
- d = Defaulted
- SR = Special ranking

=== Finals ===
Semifinals
Q	(Switzerland) Johan Nikles	7^{7}	4	2
5	(Bolivia) Hugo Dellien	6^{5}	6	6
PR	(Austria) Gerald Melzer	1	5
8	(Argentina) Camilo Ugo Carabelli	6	7

Final
5	(Bolivia) Hugo Dellien	6	7
8	(Argentina) Camilo Ugo Carabelli	3	5

=== Top half ===
First round
1	(Argentina) F Cerúndolo	2	4
(Brazil) M Pucinelli de Almeida	6	6
Q	(Switzerland) J Nikles	6	6
(Spain) A Menéndez Maceiras	4	2
(Argentina) GA Olivieri	6	3	0^{r}
(Ecuador) R Quiroz	4	6	0
(Monaco) L Catarina	4	4
6	(Argentina) R Olivo	6	6
3	(Germany) D Altmaier	7^{7}	6^{3}	6
(Argentina) G Andreozzi	6^{5}	7^{7}	2
(Argentina) N Kicker	6	2	6
Q	(Spain) C Gómez-Herrera	4	6	4
Alt	(Peru) N Álvarez	3	7^{7}	3
(Argentina) F Mena	6	6^{5}	6
(Dominican Republic) N Hardt	3	2
5	(Bolivia) H Dellien	6	6

Second round
(Brazil) M Pucinelli de Almeida	6^{2}	4
Q	(Switzerland) J Nikles	7^{7}	6
(Ecuador) R Quiroz	5	4
6	(Argentina) R Olivo	7	6
3	(Germany) D Altmaier	6	2	4
(Argentina) N Kicker	2	6	6
(Argentina) F Mena	4	4
5	(Bolivia) H Dellien	6	6

Quarterfinals
Q	(Switzerland) J Nikles	6	6
6	(Argentina) R Olivo	3	1
(Argentina) N Kicker	5	2
5	(Bolivia) H Dellien	7	6

Semifinals
Q	(Switzerland) J Nikles	7^{7}	4	2
5	(Bolivia) H Dellien	6^{5}	6	6

=== Bottom half ===
First round
7	(Argentina) JP Ficovich	3	6^{2}
PR	(Austria) G Melzer	6	7^{7}
Alt	(Spain) O Roca Batalla	7	7^{7}
Q	(Colombia) N Barrientos	5	6^{2}
Q	(Peru) J Panta	2	1
(Spain) Eduard Esteve Lobato	6	6
(Brazil) P Sakamoto	1	0^{r}
4	(Peru) JP Varillas	6	0
8	(Argentina) C Ugo Carabelli	6	6
(Colombia) N Mejía	3	0
(Germany) J Lenz	6	6
WC	(Peru) C Huertas del Pino	3	3
(Argentina) TA Tirante	3	6	1
WC	(Chile) G Lama	6	3	6
WC	(Peru) G Bueno	1	3
2	(Argentina) JM Cerúndolo	6	6

Second round
PR	(Austria) G Melzer	6	7^{7}
Alt	(Spain) O Roca Batalla	4	6^{5}
(Spain) E Esteve Lobato	6	7^{7}
4	(Peru) JP Varillas	3	6^{3}
8	(Argentina) C Ugo Carabelli	7	6
(Germany) J Lenz	5	3
WC	(Chile) G Lama	1	6^{3}
2	(Argentina) JM Cerúndolo	6	7^{7}

Quarterfinals
PR	(Austria) G Melzer	6	3
(Spain) E Esteve Lobato	2	0^{r}
8	(Argentina) C Ugo Carabelli	3	6	2
2	(Argentina) JM Cerúndolo	6	4	0^{r}

Semifinals
PR	(Austria) G Melzer	1	5
8	(Argentina) C Ugo Carabelli	6	7
