= 2023 Lima Challenger II – Singles =

Singles
- 2023 Lima Challenger II

Final
- Champion: (Italy) Luciano Darderi
- Runner-up: (Argentina) Mariano Navone
- Score: 4–6, 6–3, 7–5

Events
| Singles | Doubles |
| ← 2023 · | Lima Challenger | · 2024 → |

Álvaro Guillén Meza was the defending champion but lost in the second round to Mariano Navone.

Luciano Darderi won the title after defeating Navone 4–6, 6–3, 7–5 in the final.

== Seeds ==
1. (Peru) Juan Pablo Varillas (quarterfinals)
2. (Argentina) Federico Coria (first round)
3. (Colombia) Daniel Elahi Galán (quarterfinals)
4. (Chile) Tomás Barrios Vera (first round)
5. (Argentina) Facundo Díaz Acosta (first round)
6. (Bolivia) Hugo Dellien (first round)
7. (Argentina) Juan Manuel Cerúndolo (first round)
8. (Argentina) Francisco Comesaña (semifinals)

== Draw ==
Key

- Q = Qualifier
- WC = Wild card
- LL = Lucky loser
- Alt = Alternate
- ITF = ITF entry
- PR = Protected ranking
- SR = Special ranking
- SE = Special exempt
- JE = Junior exempt
- JR = Junior Accelerator Programme entrant
- CO = College Accelerator Programme entrant
- NG = Next Gen Accelerator Program entrant
- w/o = Walkover
- r = Retired
- d = Defaulted

=== Finals ===
Semifinals
(Italy) Luciano Darderi | 7 | 4 | 6
(Chile) Alejandro Tabilo | 5 | 6 | 3
8 | (Argentina) Francisco Comesaña | 6 | 3 | 2
(Argentina) Mariano Navone | 3 | 6 | 6

Final
(Italy) Luciano Darderi | 4 | 6 | 7
(Argentina) Mariano Navone | 6 | 3 | 5

=== Top half ===
First round
1 | (Peru) JP Varillas | 7^{7} | 6^{8} | 6
(Brazil) F Meligeni Alves | 6^{4} | 7^{10} | 4
Q | (Monaco) V Vacherot | 3 | 0
Q | (Brazil) JL Reis da Silva | 6 | 6
(Italy) L Darderi | 6 | 3 | 7
Q | (Switzerland) K Feldbausch | 4 | 6 | 5
(Argentina) C Ugo Carabelli | 6 | 6
6 | (Bolivia) H Dellien | 4 | 1
4 | (Chile) T Barrios Vera | 4 | 6 | 3
(Italy) Edoardo Lavagno | 6 | 2 | 6
Q | (Brazil) M Pucinelli de Almeida | 1 | 2
(Argentina) RA Burruchaga | 6 | 6
(Chile) A Tabilo | 6 | 6
(Paraguay) AD Vallejo | 4 | 1
WC | (Peru) C Huertas del Pino | 6 | 6
5 | (Argentina) F Díaz Acosta | 2 | 2

Second round
1 | (Peru) JP Varillas | 6 | 6
Q | (Brazil) JL Reis da Silva | 2 | 0
(Italy) L Darderi | 6 | 6
(Argentina) C Ugo Carabelli | 4 | 2
(Italy) E Lavagno | 3 | 0
(Argentina) RA Burruchaga | 6 | 6
(Chile) A Tabilo | 6 | 6
WC | (Peru) C Huertas del Pino | 3 | 4

Quarterfinals
1 | (Peru) JP Varillas | 7^{8} | 3 | 0
(Italy) L Darderi | 6^{6} | 6 | 6
(Argentina) RA Burruchaga | 2 | 5
(Chile) A Tabilo | 6 | 7

Semifinals
(Italy) L Darderi | 7 | 4 | 6
(Chile) A Tabilo | 5 | 6 | 3

=== Bottom half ===
First round
8 | (Argentina) F Comesaña | 6 | 6
(Mexico) R Pacheco Méndez | 4 | 2
(Sweden) E Ymer | 3 | 6 | 6
(Italy) F Agamenone | 6 | 1 | 4
(Italy) A Giannessi | 1 | 6 | 6
(Spain) O Roca Batalla | 6 | 3 | 2
Q | (Brazil) M Alves | 6 | 1 | 6^{5}
3 | (Colombia) DE Galán | 3 | 6 | 7^{7}
7 | (Argentina) JM Cerúndolo | 3 | 3
(Argentina) G Andreozzi | 6 | 6
(United States) O Crawford | 5 | 0
WC | (Peru) A Huertas del Pino | 7 | 6
WC | (Peru) I Buse | 7^{7} | 3 | 4
Q | (Ecuador) A Guillén Meza | 6^{2} | 6 | 6
(Argentina) M Navone | 6 | 7^{7}
2 | (Argentina) F Coria | 4 | 6^{4}

Second round
8 | (Argentina) F Comesaña | 6 | 4 | 6
(Sweden) E Ymer | 4 | 6 | 4
(Italy) A Giannessi | 4 | 3
3 | (Colombia) DE Galán | 6 | 6
(Argentina) G Andreozzi | 6 | 5 | 6
WC | (Peru) A Huertas del Pino | 2 | 7 | 4
Q | (Ecuador) A Guillén Meza | 3 | 2
(Argentina) M Navone | 6 | 6

Quarterfinals
8 | (Argentina) F Comesaña | 6 | 6
3 | (Colombia) DE Galán | 4 | 4
(Argentina) G Andreozzi | 2 | 2^{r}
(Argentina) M Navone | 6 | 2

Semifinals
8 | (Argentina) F Comesaña | 6 | 3 | 2
(Argentina) M Navone | 3 | 6 | 6
