= 2021 Lima Challenger – Doubles =

Tennis trounament

Doubles
- 2021 Lima Challenger

Final
- Champions: (Germany) Julian Lenz (Austria) Gerald Melzer
- Runners-up: (Colombia) Nicolás Barrientos (Brazil) Fernando Romboli
- Score: 7–6^{(7–4)}, 7–6^{(7–3)}

Events
Singles	Doubles
← 2020 ·	Lima Challenger	· 2021 →

Íñigo Cervantes and Oriol Roca Batalla were the defending champions but chose not to defend his title.

Julian Lenz and Gerald Melzer won the title after defeating Nicolás Barrientos and Fernando Romboli 7–6^{(7–4)}, 7–6^{(7–3)} in the final.

== Seeds ==
1. (Mexico) Hans Hach Verdugo / (Mexico) Miguel Ángel Reyes-Varela (first round)
2. (Colombia) Nicolás Barrientos / (Brazil) Fernando Romboli (final)
3. (Peru) Sergio Galdós / (Argentina) Facundo Mena (first round)
4. (Argentina) Guido Andreozzi / (Argentina) Guillermo Durán (first round)

== Draw ==
=== Key ===
- Q = Qualifier
- WC = Wild card
- LL = Lucky loser
- Alt = Alternate
- SE = Special exempt
- PR = Protected ranking
- ITF = ITF entry
- JE = Junior exempt
- w/o = Walkover
- r = Retired
- d = Defaulted
- SR = Special ranking

First round
1	(Mexico) H Hach Verdugo (Mexico) MÁ Reyes-Varela	4	6	[7]
(United States) E King (United States) JA Ore	6	3	[10]
PR	(Germany) J Lenz (Austria) G Melzer	6	7
(Argentina) JP Ficovich (Argentina) N Kicker	2	5
4	(Argentina) G Andreozzi (Argentina) G Durán	1	5
(Argentina) F Cerúndolo (Argentina) C Ugo Carabelli	6	7
WC	(Peru) A Huertas del Pino (Peru) C Huertas del Pino	4	6	[7]
WC	(Peru) G Bueno (Peru) I Buse	6	3	[10]
WC	(Peru) A Merino (Peru) J Panta	3	2
(Spain) C Gómez-Herrera (Ecuador) R Quiroz	6	6
(Bolivia) H Dellien (Bolivia) F Zeballos	6	6
3	(Peru) S Galdós (Argentina) F Mena	2	2
(Argentina) JM Cerúndolo (Argentina) TA Tirante	7^{7}	6
(Ecuador) D Hidalgo (Colombia) C Rodríguez	6^{3}	3
(Bolivia) B Arias (Spain) A Menéndez Maceiras	4	2
2	(Colombia) N Barrientos (Brazil) F Romboli	6	6

Quarterfinals
(United States) E King (United States) JA Ore	6^{2}	6	[8]
PR	(Germany) J Lenz (Austria) G Melzer	7^{7}	3	[10]
(Argentina) F Cerúndolo (Argentina) C Ugo Carabelli	7	6
WC	(Peru) G Bueno (Peru) I Buse	5	1
(Spain) C Gómez-Herrera (Ecuador) R Quiroz	3	4
(Bolivia) H Dellien (Bolivia) F Zeballos	6	6
(Argentina) JM Cerúndolo (Argentina) TA Tirante	6	1	[5]
2	(Colombia) N Barrientos (Brazil) F Romboli	2	6	[10]

Semifinals
PR	(Germany) J Lenz (Austria) G Melzer	7^{7}	7
(Argentina) F Cerúndolo (Argentina) C Ugo Carabelli	6^{5}	5
(Bolivia) H Dellien (Bolivia) F Zeballos	2	0
2	(Colombia) N Barrientos (Brazil) F Romboli	6	6

Final
PR	(Germany) J Lenz (Austria) G Melzer	7^{7}	7^{7}
2	(Colombia) N Barrientos (Brazil) F Romboli	6^{4}	6^{3}
