= 2019 Lima Challenger – Doubles =

Doubles
- 2019 Lima Challenger

Final
- Champions: (Uruguay) Ariel Behar (Ecuador) Gonzalo Escobar
- Runners-up: (Venezuela) Luis David Martínez (Brazil) Felipe Meligeni Alves
- Score: 6–2, 2–6, [10–3]

Events
Singles	Doubles
- Lima Challenger

Guido Andreozzi and Guillermo Durán were the defending champions but chose not to defend their title.

Ariel Behar and Gonzalo Escobar won the title after defeating Luis David Martínez and Felipe Meligeni Alves 6–2, 2–6, [10–3] in the final.

== Seeds ==
1. (Mexico) Miguel Ángel Reyes-Varela / (Brazil) Fernando Romboli (semifinals)
2. (Uruguay) Ariel Behar / (Ecuador) Gonzalo Escobar (champions)
3. (Peru) Sergio Galdós / (Argentina) Leonardo Mayer (quarterfinals)
4. (Venezuela) Luis David Martínez / (Brazil) Felipe Meligeni Alves (final)

== Draw ==
Key

- Q = Qualifier
- WC = Wild card
- LL = Lucky loser
- Alt = Alternate
- ITF = ITF entry
- PR = Protected ranking
- SR = Special ranking
- SE = Special exempt
- JE = Junior exempt
- JR = Junior Accelerator Programme entrant
- CO = College Accelerator Programme entrant
- NG = Next Gen Accelerator Program entrant
- w/o = Walkover
- r = Retired
- d = Defaulted

First round
1	(Mexico) MÁ Reyes-Varela (Brazil) F Romboli	6^{1}	7^{7}	[10]
(Portugal) J Domingues (Italy) L Giustino	7^{7}	6^{1}	[5]
(Ecuador) D Hidalgo (Ecuador) R Quiroz	7^{7}	3	[12]
WC	(Peru) N Álvarez (Colombia) DE Galán	6^{2}	6	[14]
4	(Venezuela) LD Martínez (Brazil) F Meligeni Alves	4	7	[13]
PR	(Spain) Í Cervantes (Spain) O Roca Batalla	6	5	[11]
(Portugal) P Sousa (Netherlands) M Vervoort	3	2
(Argentina) F Bagnis (Argentina) F Mena	6	6
Alt	(Brazil) G Clezar (Brazil) P Sakamoto	7	5	[11]
(Brazil) O Luz (Brazil) R Matos	5	7	[9]
(Dominican Republic) J Hernández-Fernández (Spain) M Vilella Martínez	3	2
3	(Peru) S Galdós (Argentina) L Mayer	6	6
WC	(Peru) A Huertas del Pino (Peru) C Huertas del Pino	6	6
(Uruguay) M Cuevas (Argentina) JP Ficovich	2	4
(Brazil) J Menezes (Bolivia) F Zeballos	4	4
2	(Uruguay) A Behar (Ecuador) G Escobar	6	6

Quarterfinals
1	(Mexico) MÁ Reyes-Varela (Brazil) F Romboli	6	7^{7}
WC	(Peru) N Álvarez (Colombia) DE Galán	4	6^{4}
4	(Venezuela) LD Martínez (Brazil) F Meligeni Alves	4	6	[10]
(Argentina) F Bagnis (Argentina) F Mena	6	3	[3]
Alt	(Brazil) G Clezar (Brazil) P Sakamoto	6	6^{4}	[10]
3	(Peru) S Galdós (Argentina) L Mayer	2	7^{7}	[8]
WC	(Peru) A Huertas del Pino (Peru) C Huertas del Pino	4	4
2	(Uruguay) A Behar (Ecuador) G Escobar	6	6

Semifinals
1	(Mexico) MÁ Reyes-Varela (Brazil) F Romboli	6	1	[5]
4	(Venezuela) LD Martínez (Brazil) F Meligeni Alves	3	6	[10]
Alt	(Brazil) G Clezar (Brazil) P Sakamoto	3	1
2	(Uruguay) A Behar (Ecuador) G Escobar	6	6

Final
4	(Venezuela) LD Martínez (Brazil) F Meligeni Alves	2	6	[3]
2	(Uruguay) A Behar (Ecuador) G Escobar	6	2	[10]
