= 2025 Lima Challenger – Doubles =

Doubles
- 2025 Lima Challenger

Final
- Champions: (Bolivia) Boris Arias (Bolivia) Federico Zeballos
- Runners-up: (United States) Sekou Bangoura (Israel) Roy Stepanov
- Score: 6–2, 1–6, [12–10]

Events
Singles	Doubles
- Lima Challenger

Karol Drzewiecki and Piotr Matuszewski were the defending champions but chose not to defend their title.

Boris Arias and Federico Zeballos won the title after defeating Sekou Bangoura and Roy Stepanov 6–2, 1–6, [12–10] in the final.

== Seeds ==
1. (Argentina) Mariano Kestelboim / (Argentina) Gonzalo Villanueva (first round)
2. (Bolivia) Boris Arias / (Bolivia) Federico Zeballos (champions)
3. (Thailand) Pruchya Isaro / (Canada) Kelsey Stevenson (semifinals)
4. (Brazil) Luís Britto / (Uruguay) Ignacio Carou (semifinals)

== Draw ==
Key

- Q = Qualifier
- WC = Wild card
- LL = Lucky loser
- Alt = Alternate
- ITF = ITF entry
- PR = Protected ranking
- SR = Special ranking
- SE = Special exempt
- JE = Junior exempt
- JR = Junior Accelerator Programme entrant
- CO = College Accelerator Programme entrant
- NG = Next Gen Accelerator Program entrant
- w/o = Walkover
- r = Retired
- d = Defaulted

=== Draw ===
First round
1	(Argentina) M Kestelboim (Argentina) G Villanueva	3	6^{5}
PR	(Brazil) M Barreiros Reyes (Colombia) JS Gómez	6	7^{7}
(United States) S Bangoura (Israel) R Stepanov	6	6
WC	(Peru) Vicente Monge (Peru) Luis José Nakamine	0	3
4	(Brazil) L Britto (Uruguay) I Carou	6	6
(Argentina) S de la Fuente (Argentina) GA Olivieri	3	4
WC	(Peru) Christopher Li (Colombia) Miguel Tobón	6	6
(Dominican Republic) P Bertran (Canada) Alvin Nicholas Tudorica	4	4
(Germany) Lucas Gerch (Germany) John Sperle	w/o
(Colombia) N Mejía (Colombia) Johan Alexander Rodríguez
(Argentina) H Casanova (Uruguay) F Roncadelli	4	2
3	(Thailand) P Isaro (Canada) K Stevenson	6	6
(Brazil) Breno Braga (Brazil) Victor Braga	w/o
Alt	(Argentina) JM La Serna (Argentina) L Midón
(Brazil) P Boscardin Dias (Argentina) GI Justo
2	(Bolivia) B Arias (Bolivia) F Zeballos	w/o

Quarterfinals
PR	(Brazil) M Barreiros Reyes (Colombia) JS Gómez	5	3
(United States) S Bangoura (Israel) R Stepanov	7	6
4	(Brazil) L Britto (Uruguay) I Carou	6	6
WC	(Peru) C Li (Colombia) M Tobón	4	4
(Germany) L Gerch (Germany) J Sperle	4	4
3	(Thailand) P Isaro (Canada) K Stevenson	6	6
(Brazil) B Braga (Brazil) V Braga	2	2
2	(Bolivia) B Arias (Bolivia) F Zeballos	6	6

Semifinals
(United States) S Bangoura (Israel) R Stepanov	6	5	[12]
4	(Brazil) L Britto (Uruguay) I Carou	4	7	[10]
3	(Thailand) P Isaro (Canada) K Stevenson	2	3
2	(Bolivia) B Arias (Bolivia) F Zeballos	6	6

Final
(United States) S Bangoura (Israel) R Stepanov	2	6	[10]
2	(Bolivia) B Arias (Bolivia) F Zeballos	6	1	[12]
