= 2025 Lima Challenger II – Doubles =

Doubles
- 2025 Lima Challenger II

Final
- Champions: (Brazil) Marcelo Demoliner (Brazil) Orlando Luz
- Runners-up: (Colombia) Cristian Rodríguez (Bolivia) Federico Zeballos
- Score: 2–6, 7–6^{(7–3)}, [10–8]

Events
Singles	Doubles
- Lima Challenger

Boris Arias and Federico Zeballos were the defending champions but chose to defend their title with different partners. Arias partnered Johannes Ingildsen but lost in the semifinals to Marcelo Demoliner and Orlando Luz. Zeballos partnered Cristian Rodríguez but lost in the final to Demoliner and Luz.

Demoliner and Luz won the title after defeating Rodríguez and Zeballos 2–6, 7–6^{(7–3)}, [10–8] in the final.

== Seeds ==
1. (Brazil) Marcelo Demoliner / (Brazil) Orlando Luz (champions)
2. (Ecuador) Gonzalo Escobar / (Mexico) Miguel Ángel Reyes-Varela (first round)
3. (Poland) Karol Drzewiecki / (Poland) Piotr Matuszewski (first round)
4. (Argentina) Federico Agustín Gómez / (Venezuela) Luis David Martínez (first round)

== Draw ==
Key

- Q = Qualifier
- WC = Wild card
- LL = Lucky loser
- Alt = Alternate
- ITF = ITF entry
- PR = Protected ranking
- SR = Special ranking
- SE = Special exempt
- JE = Junior exempt
- JR = Junior Accelerator Programme entrant
- CO = College Accelerator Programme entrant
- NG = Next Gen Accelerator Program entrant
- w/o = Walkover
- r = Retired
- d = Defaulted

First round
1	(Brazil) M Demoliner (Brazil) O Luz	6	6
(Kazakhstan) T Skatov (Spain) C Taberner	3	1
(Peru) A Merino (Germany) C Negritu	6	6
(United States) B Kittay (Brazil) M Zormann	4	4
3	(Poland) K Drzewiecki (Poland) P Matuszewski	7	1	[6]
(Bolivia) B Arias (Denmark) J Ingildsen	5	6	[10]
(Bolivia) M Dellien (Argentina) G Villanueva	6	6
(Argentina) G Durán (Argentina) M Kestelboim	4	3
(Brazil) L Britto (Czech Republic) Z Kolář	1	3
WC	(Uruguay) I Carou (Peru) A Huertas del Pino	6	6
Alt	(Mexico) R Pacheco Méndez (Brazil) PA Saraiva dos Santos	6	6
4	(Argentina) FA Gómez (Venezuela) LD Martínez	4	4
(Chile) T Barrios Vera (Argentina) F Mena	6	6
WC	(Peru) Alessandro Rubini (Colombia) Miguel Tobón	1	2
(Colombia) C Rodríguez (Bolivia) F Zeballos	7^{8}	6
2	(Ecuador) G Escobar (Mexico) M Reyes-Varela	6^{6}	2

Quarterfinals
1	(Brazil) M Demoliner (Brazil) O Luz	6	5	[10]
(Peru) A Merino (Germany) C Negritu	4	7	[2]
(Bolivia) B Arias (Denmark) J Ingildsen	w/o
(Bolivia) M Dellien (Argentina) G Villanueva
WC	(Uruguay) I Carou (Peru) A Huertas del Pino	4	6	[10]
Alt	(Mexico) R Pacheco Méndez (Brazil) PA Saraiva dos Santos	6	2	[6]
(Chile) T Barrios Vera (Argentina) F Mena	6^{3}	6	[2]
(Colombia) C Rodríguez (Bolivia) F Zeballos	7^{7}	2	[10]

Semifinals
1	(Brazil) M Demoliner (Brazil) O Luz	3	6	[10]
(Bolivia) B Arias (Denmark) J Ingildsen	6	4	[7]
WC	(Uruguay) I Carou (Peru) A Huertas del Pino	2	2
(Colombia) C Rodríguez (Bolivia) F Zeballos	6	6

Final
1	(Brazil) M Demoliner (Brazil) O Luz	2	7^{7}	[10]
(Colombia) C Rodríguez (Bolivia) F Zeballos	6	6^{3}	[8]
