= 2015 Lima Challenger =

- Date: 26 October – 1 November
- Edition: 9th
- Surface: Clay
- Location: Lima, Peru

Champions

Singles
- (Portugal) Gastão Elias

Doubles
- (Slovakia) Andrej Martin / (Chile) Hans Podlipnik
← 2014 ·	Lima Challenger	· 2016 →

The 2015 Lima Challenger was a professional tennis tournament played on clay courts. It was the ninth edition of the tournament which was part of the 2015 ATP Challenger Tour. It took place in Lima, Peru between October 26 and November 1, 2015.

== Singles main-draw entrants ==
=== Seeds ===
Country	Player	Rank^{1}	Seed
BIH	Damir Džumhur	77	1
ARG	Guido Pella	80	2
COL	Alejandro González	114	3
BEL	Kimmer Coppejans	116	4
ARG	Facundo Argüello	120	5
ARG	Máximo González	138	6
ARG	Carlos Berlocq	139	7
BRA	João Souza	144	8

- ^{1} Rankings are as of October 19, 2015.

=== Other entrants ===
The following players received wildcards into the singles main draw:

- (Peru) Nicolás Álvarez
- (Peru) Mauricio Echazú
- (Ecuador) Emilio Gómez
- (Peru) Juan Pablo Varillas

The following players received entry from the qualifying draw:

- (Bolivia) Hugo Dellien
- (Chile) Cristian Garín
- (Austria) Michael Linzer
- (Argentina) Juan Ignacio Londero

== Champions ==
=== Singles ===
- (Portugal) Gastão Elias def. (Slovakia) Andrej Martin 6–2, 7–6^{(7–4)}

=== Doubles ===
- (Slovakia) Andrej Martin / (Chile) Hans Podlipnik def. (Brazil) Rogério Dutra Silva / (Brazil) João Souza 6–3, 6–4
