= 2023 Lima Challenger II – Doubles =

Doubles
- 2023 Lima Challenger II

Final
- Champions: (Brazil) Mateus Alves (Brazil) Eduardo Ribeiro
- Runners-up: (Colombia) Nicolás Barrientos (Brazil) Orlando Luz
- Score: 3–6, 7–5, [10–8]

Events
Singles	Doubles
← 2023 ·	Lima Challenger	· 2024 →

Gonzalo Bueno and Daniel Vallejo were the defending champions but only Vallejo chose to defend his title, partnering Ignacio Buse. Vallejo lost in the first round to Renzo Olivo and Elias Ymer.

Mateus Alves and Eduardo Ribeiro won the title after defeating Nicolás Barrientos and Orlando Luz 3–6, 7–5, [10–8] in the final.

== Seeds ==
1. (Argentina) Guido Andreozzi / (Argentina) Guillermo Durán (semifinals)
2. (Ecuador) Diego Hidalgo / (Colombia) Cristian Rodríguez (semifinals)
3. (Colombia) Nicolás Barrientos / (Brazil) Orlando Luz (final)
4. (Bolivia) Boris Arias / (Bolivia) Federico Zeballos (first round)

== Draw ==
=== Key ===
- Q = Qualifier
- WC = Wild card
- LL = Lucky loser
- Alt = Alternate
- SE = Special exempt
- PR = Protected ranking
- ITF = ITF entry
- JE = Junior exempt
- w/o = Walkover
- r = Retired
- d = Defaulted
- SR = Special ranking

First round
1	(Argentina) G Andreozzi (Argentina) G Durán	6	6
(Bolivia) M Dellien (Brazil) D Dutra da Silva	4	2
WC	(Peru) JP Varillas (Peru) Rodrigo Varillas	1	5
(Italy) Edoardo Lavagno (Monaco) V Vacherot	6	7
3	(Colombia) N Barrientos (Brazil) O Luz	6	3	[10]
(Brazil) F Romboli (Brazil) M Zormann	3	6	[7]
(Italy) A Giannessi (Spain) O Roca Batalla	3	3
(Peru) A Huertas del Pino (Peru) C Huertas del Pino	6	6
Alt	(Brazil) M Alves (Brazil) E Ribeiro	6	4	[10]
(Switzerland) L Margaroli (Argentina) S Rodríguez Taverna	2	6	[7]
(Uruguay) I Carou (Argentina) C Ugo Carabelli	1	7	[10]
4	(Bolivia) B Arias (Bolivia) F Zeballos	6	5	[3]
(Argentina) R Olivo (Sweden) E Ymer	4	6	[10]
WC	(Peru) I Buse (Paraguay) AD Vallejo	6	3	[4]
(Brazil) G Heide (Brazil) JL Reis da Silva	3	2
2	(Ecuador) D Hidalgo (Colombia) C Rodríguez	6	6

Quarterfinals
1	(Argentina) G Andreozzi (Argentina) G Durán	6	6
(Italy) E Lavagno (Monaco) V Vacherot	1	3
3	(Colombia) N Barrientos (Brazil) O Luz	7^{7}	6
(Peru) A Huertas del Pino (Peru) C Huertas del Pino	6^{4}	4
Alt	(Brazil) M Alves (Brazil) E Ribeiro	2	6	[12]
(Uruguay) I Carou (Argentina) C Ugo Carabelli	6	3	[10]
(Argentina) R Olivo (Sweden) E Ymer	3	0
2	(Ecuador) D Hidalgo (Colombia) C Rodríguez	6	6

Semifinals
1	(Argentina) G Andreozzi (Argentina) G Durán	3	6	[5]
3	(Colombia) N Barrientos (Brazil) O Luz	6	2	[10]
Alt	(Brazil) M Alves (Brazil) E Ribeiro	6	7^{7}
2	(Ecuador) D Hidalgo (Colombia) C Rodríguez	3	6^{4}

Final
3	(Colombia) N Barrientos (Brazil) O Luz	6	5	[8]
Alt	(Brazil) M Alves (Brazil) E Ribeiro	3	7	[10]
