= 2019 Lima Challenger – Singles =

Singles
- 2019 Lima Challenger

Final
- Champion: (Brazil) Thiago Monteiro
- Runner-up: (Argentina) Federico Coria
- Score: 6–2, 6–7^{(7–9)}, 6–4

Events
Singles	Doubles
← 2018 ·	Lima Challenger	· 2020 →

Cristian Garín was the defending champion but chose not to defend his title.

Thiago Monteiro won the title after defeating Federico Coria 6–2, 6–7^{(7–9)}, 6–4 in the final.

== Seeds ==
All seeds receive a bye into the second round.

1. (Italy) Marco Cecchinato (second round)
2. (Argentina) Leonardo Mayer (third round)
3. (Brazil) Thiago Monteiro (champion)
4. (Slovakia) Andrej Martin (second round)
5. (Portugal) Pedro Sousa (second round)
6. (India) Sumit Nagal (second round)
7. (Argentina) Federico Coria (final)
8. (Argentina) Facundo Bagnis (semifinals)
9. (Italy) Lorenzo Giustino (second round, retired)
10. (Peru) Juan Pablo Varillas (semifinals)
11. (Spain) Mario Vilella Martínez (third round)
12. (Portugal) João Domingues (second round)
13. (Germany) Yannick Hanfmann (third round)
14. (Argentina) Facundo Mena (second round)
15. (Brazil) João Menezes (quarterfinals)
16. (Argentina) Andrea Collarini (third round)

== Draw ==
=== Key ===
- Q = Qualifier
- WC = Wild card
- LL = Lucky loser
- Alt = Alternate
- SE = Special exempt
- PR = Protected ranking
- ITF = ITF entry
- JE = Junior exempt
- w/o = Walkover
- r = Retired
- d = Defaulted
- SR = Special ranking

=== Finals ===
Quarterfinals
(Brazil) Thiago Seyboth Wild	5	5
10	(Peru) Juan Pablo Varillas	7	7
3	(Brazil) Thiago Monteiro	7	6
(Argentina) Juan Pablo Ficovich	5	3
8	(Argentina) Facundo Bagnis	6	6
(Colombia) Daniel Elahi Galán	4	2
7	(Argentina) Federico Coria	6	3	6
15	(Brazil) João Menezes	4	6	3

Semifinals
10	(Peru) Juan Pablo Varillas	4	2
3	(Brazil) Thiago Monteiro	6	6
8	(Argentina) Facundo Bagnis	5	7	0
7	(Argentina) Federico Coria	7	5	6

Final
3	(Brazil) Thiago Monteiro	6	6^{7}	6
7	(Argentina) Federico Coria	2	7^{9}	4

=== Top half ===
==== Section 1 ====
First round
(Spain) O Roca Batalla	4	3
(Brazil) T Seyboth Wild	6	6
(France) M Chazal	3	4
(Ecuador) R Quiroz	6	6
(Brazil) G Clezar	6	6
WC	(Peru) J Panta	2	3
(Sweden) C Lindell	2	4
(Brazil) O Luz	6	6

Second round
1	(Italy) M Cecchinato	6^{4}	4
(Brazil) T Seyboth Wild	7^{7}	6
(Ecuador) R Quiroz	4	3
16	(Argentina) A Collarini	6	6
10	(Peru) JP Varillas	7	6
(Brazil) G Clezar	5	2
(Brazil) O Luz	6	6
6	(India) S Nagal	1	4

Third round
(Brazil) T Seyboth Wild	6	6^{6}	6
16	(Argentina) A Collarini	1	7^{8}	1
10	(Peru) JP Varillas	7^{7}	7^{7}
(Brazil) O Luz	6^{3}	6^{5}

Quarterfinals
(Brazil) T Seyboth Wild	5	5
10	(Peru) JP Varillas	7	7

==== Section 2 ====
First round
(Uruguay) M Cuevas	6	6
(Argentina) R Olivo	3	4
(Peru) N Álvarez	3	3
(Brazil) Oscar José Gutierrez	6	6
WC	(Peru) A Huertas del Pino	2	3
(Argentina) TM Etcheverry	6	6
(Argentina) JP Ficovich	7	6
(Argentina) A Velotti	5	3

Second round
3	(Brazil) T Monteiro	6	7^{7}
(Uruguay) M Cuevas	3	6^{4}
(Brazil) OJ Gutierrez	3	3
13	(Germany) Y Hanfmann	6	6
12	(Portugal) J Domingues	3	2
(Argentina) TM Etcheverry	6	6
(Argentina) JP Ficovich	6	6
5	(Portugal) P Sousa	4	2

Third round
3	(Brazil) T Monteiro	1	6	7
13	(Germany) Y Hanfmann	6	3	5
(Argentina) TM Etcheverry	2	4
(Argentina) JP Ficovich	6	6

Quarterfinals
3	(Brazil) T Monteiro	7	6
(Argentina) JP Ficovich	5	3

=== Bottom half ===
==== Section 3 ====
First round
WC	(Peru) Pedro Iamachkine	7	6^{4}	2
Q	(Colombia) A González	5	7^{7}	6
Q	(Brazil) R Matos	6	6
WC	(Peru) C Huertas del Pino	4	1
(Colombia) DE Galán	6	3	7^{9}
(Ecuador) D Hidalgo	3	6	6^{7}
Alt	(Argentina) C Ugo Carabelli	6	6
WC	(Peru) M Echazú	2	2

Second round
8	(Argentina) F Bagnis	6	6
Q	(Colombia) A González	3	3
Q	(Brazil) R Matos	6	5
9	(Italy) L Giustino	3	2^{r}
14	(Argentina) F Mena	1	4
(Colombia) DE Galán	6	6
Alt	(Argentina) C Ugo Carabelli	6	7^{7}
4	(Slovakia) A Martin	3	6^{5}

Third round
8	(Argentina) F Bagnis	6	6
Q	(Brazil) R Matos	3	2
(Colombia) DE Galán	6	7
Alt	(Argentina) C Ugo Carabelli	3	5

Quarterfinals
8	(Argentina) F Bagnis	6	6
(Colombia) DE Galán	4	2

==== Section 4 ====
First round
(Argentina) F Cerúndolo	6	6
(United States) U Blanch	2	2
(Dominican Republic) J Hernández-Fernández	5	7^{7}	0
(Brazil) P Sakamoto	7	6^{5}	6
(Serbia) P Krstin	6	6
(Argentina) G Villanueva	3	0
PR	(Spain) Í Cervantes	4	6	6
(Brazil) F Meligeni Alves	6	3	4

Second round
7	(Argentina) F Coria	7	6
(Argentina) F Cerúndolo	5	4
(Brazil) P Sakamoto	6	3	6^{3}
11	(Spain) M Vilella Martínez	4	6	7^{7}
15	(Brazil) J Menezes	4	6	3
(Serbia) P Krstin	6	1	0^{r}
PR	(Spain) Í Cervantes	2	3
2	(Argentina) L Mayer	6	6

Third round
7	(Argentina) F Coria	6	6
11	(Spain) M Vilella Martínez	2	1
15	(Brazil) J Menezes	6	1	6
2	(Argentina) L Mayer	4	6	4

Quarterfinals
7	(Argentina) F Coria	6	3	6
15	(Brazil) J Menezes	4	6	3
