= 2017 Lima Challenger – Doubles =

Doubles
- 2017 Lima Challenger

Final
- Champions: (Mexico) Miguel Ángel Reyes-Varela; (Slovenia) Blaž Rola
- Runners-up: (Portugal) Gonçalo Oliveira; (Poland) Grzegorz Panfil
- Score: 7–5, 6–3

Events
Singles	Doubles
- Lima Challenger

Sergio Galdós and Leonardo Mayer were the defending champions but only Galdós chose to defend his title, partnering Ariel Behar. Galdós lost in the semifinals to Gonçalo Oliveira and Grzegorz Panfil.

Miguel Ángel Reyes-Varela and Blaž Rola won the title after defeating Oliveira and Panfil 7–5, 6–3 in the final.

== Seeds ==
1. (Uruguay) Ariel Behar / (Peru) Sergio Galdós (semifinals)
2. (Argentina) Máximo González / (Brazil) Fabrício Neis (semifinals)
3. (Monaco) Romain Arneodo / (Italy) Marco Cecchinato (first round)
4. (Portugal) Gonçalo Oliveira / (Poland) Grzegorz Panfil (final)

== Draw ==
Key

- Q = Qualifier
- WC = Wild card
- LL = Lucky loser
- Alt = Alternate
- ITF = ITF entry
- PR = Protected ranking
- SR = Special ranking
- SE = Special exempt
- JE = Junior exempt
- JR = Junior Accelerator Programme entrant
- CO = College Accelerator Programme entrant
- NG = Next Gen Accelerator Program entrant
- w/o = Walkover
- r = Retired
- d = Defaulted

First round

Quarterfinals

Semifinals

Final

1
- (Uruguay) A Behar
- (Peru) S Galdós
6
6

WC
- (Peru) M Echazú
- (Austria) M Linzer
3
1

1
- (Uruguay) A Behar
- (Peru) S Galdós
3
6
[10]

- (Argentina) F Bagnis
- (Argentina) R Olivo
5
6
[10]

- (Argentina) F Bagnis
- (Argentina) R Olivo
6
3
[4]

- (Dominican Republic) V Estrella Burgos
- (Argentina) JI Londero
7
3
[7]

1
- (Uruguay) A Behar
- (Peru) S Galdós
2
7^{7}
[3]

4
- (Portugal) G Oliveira
- (Poland) G Panfil
6
3
[10]

4
- (Portugal) G Oliveira
- (Poland) G Panfil
6
6^{3}
[10]

- (Uruguay) M Cuevas
- (Argentina) N Kicker
4
6
[4]

4
- (Portugal) G Oliveira
- (Poland) G Panfil
7^{7}
6

WC
- (Peru) D Beretta
- (Peru) JP Varillas
6
6^{4}
[10]

- (Argentina) F Coria
- (Portugal) J Domingues
6^{5}
2

- (Argentina) F Coria
- (Portugal) J Domingues
3
7^{7}
[12]

4
- (Portugal) G Oliveira
- (Poland) G Panfil
5
3

- (Mexico) MÁ Reyes-Varela
- (Slovenia) B Rola
7
5
[11]

- (Mexico) MÁ Reyes-Varela
- (Slovenia) B Rola
7
6

- (Argentina) P Cachin
- (Spain) R Carballés Baena
5
7
[9]

- (Mexico) MÁ Reyes-Varela
- (Slovenia) B Rola
1
7
[10]

- (Argentina) F Agamenone
- (Argentina) T Lipovšek Puches
5
6
[10]

- (Argentina) F Agamenone
- (Argentina) T Lipovšek Puches
6
5
[8]

3
- (Monaco) R Arneodo
- (Italy) M Cecchinato
7
3
[8]

- (Mexico) MÁ Reyes-Varela
- (Slovenia) B Rola
6
6

- (Spain) Í Cervantes
- (Brazil) F de Paula
4
6
[10]

2
- (Argentina) M González
- (Brazil) F Neis
3
2

WC
- (Peru) N Álvarez
- (Dominican Republic) J Hernández-Fernández
6
2
[5]

- (Spain) Í Cervantes
- (Brazil) F de Paula
4
3

- (Spain) C Taberner
- (Spain) M Vilella Martínez
4
6^{7}

2
- (Argentina) M González
- (Brazil) F Neis
6
6

2
- (Argentina) M González
- (Brazil) F Neis
6
7^{9}
