= 2018 Lima Challenger =

- Date: 22 October – 27 October
- Edition: 12th
- Surface: Clay
- Location: Lima, Peru

Champions

Singles
- (Chile) Christian Garín

Doubles
- (Argentina) Guido Andreozzi / (Argentina) Guillermo Durán
- Lima Challenger

The 2018 Lima Challenger was a professional tennis tournament played on clay courts. It was the twelfth edition of the tournament, part of the 2018 ATP Challenger Tour. It took place in Lima, Peru between October 22 and October 27, 2018.

== Singles main-draw entrants ==
=== Seeds ===
Country	Player	Rank^{1}	Seed
URU	Pablo Cuevas	66	1
ARG	Federico Delbonis	74	2
ARG	Guido Andreozzi	92	3
CHI	Christian Garín	103	4
ESP	Pablo Andújar	106	5
BRA	Thiago Monteiro	114	6
ITA	Paolo Lorenzi	115	7
BOL	Hugo Dellien	116	8

- ^{1} Rankings are as of 15 October 2018.

=== Other entrants ===
The following players received wildcards into the singles main draw:

- (Peru) Nicolás Álvarez
- (Ecuador) Emilio Gómez
- (Japan) Kento Tagashira
- (Peru) Juan Pablo Varillas

The following player received entry into the singles main draw using a protected ranking:

- (Colombia) Santiago Giraldo

The following player received entry into the singles main draw as an alternate:

- (Serbia) Miljan Zekić

The following players received entry from the qualifying draw:

- (Chile) Marcelo Tomás Barrios Vera
- (Argentina) Andrea Collarini
- (Argentina) Renzo Olivo
- (Colombia) Cristian Rodríguez

== Champions ==
=== Singles ===
- (Chile) Christian Garín def. (Portugal) Pedro Sousa 6–4, 6–4.

=== Doubles ===
- (Argentina) Guido Andreozzi / (Argentina) Guillermo Durán def. (Uruguay) Ariel Behar / (Ecuador) Gonzalo Escobar 2–6, 7–6^{(7–5)}, [10–5].
