= 2015 Lima Challenger – Doubles =

Doubles
- 2015 Lima Challenger

Final
- Champions: (Slovakia) Andrej Martin (Chile) Hans Podlipnik
- Runners-up: (Brazil) Rogério Dutra Silva (Brazil) João Souza
- Score: 6–3, 6–4

Events
Singles	Doubles
- Lima Challenger

Andrej Martin and Hans Podlipnik won the title, beating Rogério Dutra Silva and João Souza 6–3, 6–4

== Seeds ==
1. (Argentina) Guillermo Durán / (Argentina) Andrés Molteni (quarterfinals)
2. (Slovakia) Andrej Martin / (Chile) Hans Podlipnik (champions)
3. (Chile) Julio Peralta / (Argentina) Horacio Zeballos (semifinals)
4. (Argentina) Guido Andreozzi / (Bolivia) Hugo Dellien (first round)

== Draw ==
Key

- Q = Qualifier
- WC = Wild card
- LL = Lucky loser
- Alt = Alternate
- ITF = ITF entry
- PR = Protected ranking
- SR = Special ranking
- SE = Special exempt
- JE = Junior exempt
- JR = Junior Accelerator Programme entrant
- CO = College Accelerator Programme entrant
- NG = Next Gen Accelerator Program entrant
- w/o = Walkover
- r = Retired
- d = Defaulted

=== Draw ===
First round
1	(Argentina) G Durán (Argentina) A Molteni	6	7
(Bosnia and Herzegovina) D Džumhur (Austria) M Linzer	0	5
(Dominican Republic) J Hernández (Sweden) C Lindell	6	6
(Portugal) G Elias (Brazil) A Ghem	4	4
4	(Argentina) G Andreozzi (Bolivia) H Dellien	3	2
(Peru) S Galdós (Argentina) M Trungelliti	6	6
(Italy) R Bellotti (Austria) D Novak	1	3
(Brazil) R Dutra Silva (Brazil) J Souza	6	6
WC	(Ecuador) G Escobar (Peru) JP Varillas	6	7
WC	(Argentina) Juan Ignacio Galarza (Peru) Juan Jose Rosas	2	5
(Argentina) F Argüello (Uruguay) M Cuevas	3	2
3	(Chile) J Peralta (Argentina) H Zeballos	6	6
(Brazil) G Clezar (Brazil) F Neis	4	6	[10]
(Argentina) P Cachin (Argentina) R Olivo	6	3	[8]
WC	(Peru) D Beretta (Peru) M Echazú	4	2
2	(Slovakia) A Martin (Chile) H Podlipnik	6	6

Quarterfinals
1	(Argentina) G Durán (Argentina) A Molteni	6^{6}	4
(Dominican Republic) J Hernández (Sweden) C Lindell	7^{8}	6
(Peru) S Galdós (Argentina) M Trungelliti	2	6^{3}
(Brazil) R Dutra Silva (Brazil) J Souza	6	7^{7}
WC	(Ecuador) G Escobar (Peru) JP Varillas	4	2
3	(Chile) J Peralta (Argentina) H Zeballos	6	6
(Brazil) G Clezar (Brazil) F Neis	2	6	[6]
2	(Slovakia) A Martin (Chile) H Podlipnik	6	3	[10]

Semifinals
(Dominican Republic) J Hernández (Sweden) C Lindell	3	1
(Brazil) R Dutra Silva (Brazil) J Souza	6	6
3	(Chile) J Peralta (Argentina) H Zeballos	5	2
2	(Slovakia) A Martin (Chile) H Podlipnik	7	6

Final
(Brazil) R Dutra Silva (Brazil) J Souza	3	4
2	(Slovakia) A Martin (Chile) H Podlipnik	6	6
