= 2023 Lima Challenger II =

- Date: 6–12 November
- Edition: 20th
- Surface: Clay
- Location: Lima, Peru

Champions

Singles
- (Italy) Luciano Darderi

Doubles
- (Brazil) Mateus Alves / (Brazil) Eduardo Ribeiro
- Lima Challenger

The 2023 DirecTV Open Lima, also known as the Lima Challenger II, was a professional tennis tournament played on clay courts. It was the 20th edition of the tournament which was part of the 2023 ATP Challenger Tour. It took place in Lima, Peru between 6 and 12 November 2023.

== Singles main-draw entrants ==
=== Seeds ===
Country	Player	Rank^{1}	Seed
PER	Juan Pablo Varillas	65	1
ARG	Federico Coria	78	2
COL	Daniel Elahi Galán	96	3
CHI	Tomás Barrios Vera	104	4
ARG	Facundo Díaz Acosta	107	5
BOL	Hugo Dellien	115	6
ARG	Juan Manuel Cerúndolo	116	7
ARG	Francisco Comesaña	123	8

- ^{1} Rankings are as of 30 October 2023.

=== Other entrants ===
The following players received wildcards into the singles main draw:

- (Peru) Ignacio Buse
- (Peru) Arklon Huertas del Pino
- (Peru) Conner Huertas del Pino

The following players received entry from the qualifying draw:

- (Brazil) Mateus Alves
- (Switzerland) Kilian Feldbausch
- (Ecuador) Álvaro Guillén Meza
- (Brazil) Matheus Pucinelli de Almeida
- (Brazil) João Lucas Reis da Silva
- (Monaco) Valentin Vacherot

== Champions ==
=== Singles ===
- (Italy) Luciano Darderi def. (Argentina) Mariano Navone 4–6, 6–3, 7–5.

=== Doubles ===
- (Brazil) Mateus Alves / (Brazil) Eduardo Ribeiro def. (Colombia) Nicolás Barrientos / (Brazil) Orlando Luz 3–6, 7–5, [10–8].
