= 2021 Lima Challenger =

Tennis tournament

- Date: 27 September – 3 October
- Edition: 15th
- Surface: Clay
- Location: Lima, Peru

Champions

Singles
- (Bolivia) Hugo Dellien

Doubles
- (Germany) Julian Lenz / (Austria) Gerald Melzer
← 2020 ·	Lima Challenger	· 2021 →

The 2021 Lima Challenger was a professional tennis tournament played on clay courts. It was the fifteenth edition of the tournament which was part of the 2021 ATP Challenger Tour. It took place in Lima, Peru between 27 September and 3 October 2021.

== Singles main-draw entrants ==
=== Seeds ===
Country	Player	Rank^{1}	Seed
ARG	Francisco Cerúndolo	103	1
ARG	Juan Manuel Cerúndolo	106	2
GER	Daniel Altmaier	112	3
PER	Juan Pablo Varillas	121	4
BOL	Hugo Dellien	141	5
ARG	Renzo Olivo	202	6
ARG	Juan Pablo Ficovich	236	7
ARG	Camilo Ugo Carabelli	244	8

- ^{1} Rankings are as of 20 September 2021.

=== Other entrants ===
The following players received wildcards into the singles main draw:

- (Peru) Gonzalo Bueno
- (Peru) Conner Huertas del Pino
- (Chile) Gonzalo Lama

The following player received entry into the singles main draw using a protected ranking:

- (Austria) Gerald Melzer

The following players received entry into the singles main draw as alternates:

- (Peru) Nicolás Álvarez
- (Spain) Oriol Roca Batalla

The following players received entry from the qualifying draw:

- (Colombia) Nicolás Barrientos
- (Spain) Carlos Gómez-Herrera
- (Switzerland) Johan Nikles
- (Peru) Jorge Panta

== Champions ==
=== Singles ===
- (Bolivia) Hugo Dellien def. (Argentina) Camilo Ugo Carabelli 6–3, 7–5.

=== Doubles ===
- (Germany) Julian Lenz / (Austria) Gerald Melzer def. (Colombia) Nicolás Barrientos / (Brazil) Fernando Romboli 7–6^{(7–4)}, 7–6^{(7–3)}.
