= 2025 Lima Challenger II =

- Date: 3 – 9 November
- Edition: 24th
- Surface: Clay
- Location: Lima, Peru

Champions

Singles
- (Chile) Tomás Barrios Vera

Doubles
- (Brazil) Marcelo Demoliner / (Brazil) Orlando Luz
- Lima Challenger

The 2025 IGMA Open was a professional tennis tournament played on clay courts. It was the 24th edition of the tournament which was part of the 2025 ATP Challenger Tour. It took place in Lima, Peru at the Club Terrazas Miraflores between 3 and 9 November 2025.

== Singles main-draw entrants ==
=== Seeds ===
Country	Player	Rank^{1}	Seed
ARG	Mariano Navone	86	1
ESP	Carlos Taberner	104	2
CHI	Cristian Garín	105	3
ARG	Román Andrés Burruchaga	106	4
PER	Ignacio Buse	110	5
CHI	Tomás Barrios Vera	117	6
LTU	Vilius Gaubas	130	7
USA	Tristan Boyer	152	8

- ^{1} Rankings are as of 27 October 2025.

=== Other entrants ===
The following players received wildcards into the singles main draw:

- (Chile) Cristian Garín
- (Peru) Arklon Huertas del Pino
- (Peru) Juan Pablo Varillas

The following player received entry into the singles main draw through the Junior Accelerator programme:

- (Colombia) Miguel Tobón

The following players received entry into the singles main draw as alternates:

- (Italy) Marco Cecchinato
- Ivan Gakhov

The following players received entry from the qualifying draw:

- (Bolivia) Murkel Dellien
- (Argentina) Mariano Kestelboim
- (Argentina) Nicolás Kicker
- (Uruguay) Franco Roncadelli
- (Argentina) Juan Bautista Torres
- (Argentina) Gonzalo Villanueva

== Champions ==
=== Singles ===
- (Chile) Tomás Barrios Vera def. (Brazil) João Lucas Reis da Silva 7–6^{(7–5)}, 7–6^{(7–3)}.

=== Doubles ===
- (Brazil) Marcelo Demoliner / (Brazil) Orlando Luz def. (Colombia) Cristian Rodríguez / (Bolivia) Federico Zeballos 2–6, 7–6^{(7–3)}, [10–8].
