= 2009 Lima Challenger =

- Date: 16 November – 22 November
- Edition: 5th
- Location: Lima, Peru

Champions

Singles
- (Argentina) Eduardo Schwank

Doubles
- (Argentina) Martín Alund / (Argentina) Juan-Martín Aranguren
- Lima Challenger

The 2009 Lima Challenger was a professional tennis tournament played on outdoor red clay courts. It was the sixth edition of the tournament which was part of the 2009 ATP Challenger Tour. It took place in Lima, Peru between 16 and 22 November 2009.

== ATP entrants ==
=== Seeds ===
Country	Player	Rank^{1}	Seed
ARG	Eduardo Schwank	146	1
BRA	Júlio Silva	147	2
BRA	João Souza	165	3
ARG	Gastón Gaudio	171	4
ARG	Brian Dabul	183	5
ARG	Diego Junqueira	192	6
ARG	Juan-Martín Aranguren	195	7
CHI	Jorge Aguilar	244	8

- Rankings are as of November 9, 2009.

=== Other entrants ===
The following players received wildcards into the singles main draw:

- (Peru) Duilio Beretta
- (Peru) Francisco Carbajal
- (Peru) Sergio Galdós
- (Peru) Iván Miranda

The following players received entry from the qualifying draw:

- (Argentina) Diego Cristín
- (Chile) Hans Podlipnik-Castillo
- (Chile) Guillermo Rivera Aránguiz
- (Chile) Cristóbal Saavedra-Corvalán

== Champions ==
=== Singles ===
(Argentina) Eduardo Schwank def. (Chile) Jorge Aguilar, 7–5, 6–4

=== Doubles ===
(Argentina) Martín Alund / (Argentina) Juan-Martín Aranguren def. (Chile) Cristóbal Saavedra-Corvalán / (Chile) Guillermo Rivera Aránguiz, 6–4, 6–4
