= 2025 Lima Challenger – Singles =

Singles
- 2025 Lima Challenger

Final
- Champion: (Bolivia) Juan Carlos Prado Ángelo
- Runner-up: (Peru) Gonzalo Bueno
- Score: 6–4, 7–5

Events
Singles	Doubles
- Lima Challenger

Vít Kopřiva was the defending champion but chose not to defend his title.

Juan Carlos Prado Ángelo won the title after defeating Gonzalo Bueno 6–4, 7–5 in the final.

== Seeds ==
1. (Colombia) Nicolás Mejía (quarterfinals)
2. (Brazil) João Lucas Reis da Silva (first round)
3. (Argentina) Lautaro Midón (second round)
4. (Brazil) Matheus Pucinelli de Almeida (quarterfinals)
5. (Argentina) Genaro Alberto Olivieri (quarterfinals)
6. (Argentina) Juan Bautista Torres (second round)
7. (Argentina) Renzo Olivo (first round)
8. (Peru) Gonzalo Bueno (final)

== Draw ==
Key

- Q = Qualifier
- WC = Wild card
- LL = Lucky loser
- Alt = Alternate
- ITF = ITF entry
- PR = Protected ranking
- SR = Special ranking
- SE = Special exempt
- JE = Junior exempt
- JR = Junior Accelerator Programme entrant
- CO = College Accelerator Programme entrant
- NG = Next Gen Accelerator Program entrant
- w/o = Walkover
- r = Retired
- d = Defaulted

=== Finals ===
Semifinals
(Bolivia) Juan Carlos Prado Ángelo	6	6
(Brazil) Pedro Boscardin Dias	4	1
8	(Peru) Gonzalo Bueno	7	7^{7}
Q	(United States) Dali Blanch	5	6^{3}

Final
(Bolivia) Juan Carlos Prado Ángelo	6	7
8	(Peru) Gonzalo Bueno	4	5

=== Top half ===
First round
1	(Colombia) N Mejía	7^{7}	7
(Argentina) N Kicker	6^{2}	5
(Canada) Alvin Nicholas Tudorica	6	4	3
Q	(Brazil) Pedro Rodrigues	4	6	6
WC	(Peru) Christopher Li	1	6	2
(Bolivia) JC Prado Ángelo	6	4	6
(Thailand) M Jones	7^{7}	6
7	(Argentina) R Olivo	6^{2}	4
3	(Argentina) L Midón	6	6
WC	(Peru) Nicolás Baena	0	4
(Uruguay) F Roncadelli	3	2
(Brazil) P Boscardin Dias	6	6
(Argentina) LE Ambrogi	5	0^{r}
(Argentina) A Barrena	7	2
Q	(United States) B Kuzuhara	6^{5}	3
6	(Argentina) JB Torres	7^{7}	6

Second round
1	(Colombia) N Mejía	7^{7}	6^{3}	6
Q	(Brazil) P Rodrigues	6^{5}	7^{7}	3
(Bolivia) JC Prado Ángelo	6	5	6
(Thailand) M Jones	3	7	3
3	(Argentina) L Midón	0	2
(Brazil) P Boscardin Dias	6	6
(Argentina) A Barrena	5	6	6
6	(Argentina) JB Torres	7	3	4

Quarterfinals
1	(Colombia) N Mejía	3	2
(Bolivia) JC Prado Ángelo	6	6
(Brazil) P Boscardin Dias	6	6
(Argentina) A Barrena	3	2

Semifinals
(Bolivia) JC Prado Ángelo	6	6
(Brazil) P Boscardin Dias	4	1

=== Bottom half ===
First round
8	(Peru) G Bueno	6	6
(Argentina) GI Justo	0	4
(Argentina) H Casanova	7	6
(Argentina) M Kestelboim	5	3
(Argentina) G Villanueva	6	6
Alt	(Mexico) A Hernández	1	1
Alt	(Dominican Republic) P Bertran	1	2
4	(Brazil) M Pucinelli de Almeida	6	6
5	(Argentina) GA Olivieri	6	3	6
WC	(Peru) C Huertas del Pino	3	6	3
Q	(Germany) John Sperle	4	5
PR	(Jamaica) B Bicknell	6	7
Q	(Colombia) Johan Alexander Rodríguez	2	6^{10}
Q	(United States) Dali Blanch	6	7^{12}
Q	(Colombia) Miguel Tobón	6	7
2	(Brazil) JL Reis da Silva	2	5

Second round
8	(Peru) G Bueno	6	2
(Argentina) H Casanova	2	0^{r}
(Argentina) G Villanueva	1	4
4	(Brazil) M Pucinelli de Almeida	6	6
5	(Argentina) GA Olivieri	6	6
PR	(Jamaica) B Bicknell	3	1
Q	(United States) Dal Blanch	7	6
Q	(Colombia) M Tobón	5	3

Quarterfinals
8	(Peru) G Bueno	6	6
4	(Brazil) M Pucinelli de Almeida	3	1
5	(Argentina) GA Olivieri	6^{6}	6^{4}
Q	(United States) Dal Blanch	7^{8}	7^{7}

Semifinals
8	(Peru) G Bueno	7	7^{7}
Q	(United States) Dal Blanch	5	6^{3}
