= 2025 Lima Challenger =

- Date: 23–28 June
- Edition: 23rd
- Surface: Clay
- Location: Lima, Peru

Champions

Singles
- (Bolivia) Juan Carlos Prado Ángelo

Doubles
- (Bolivia) Boris Arias / (Bolivia) Federico Zeballos
- Lima Challenger

The 2025 Lima Challenger was a professional tennis tournament played on clay courts. It was the 23rd edition of the tournament which was part of the 2025 ATP Challenger Tour. It took place in Lima, Peru between 23 and 28 June 2025.

== Singles main-draw entrants ==
=== Seeds ===
Country	Player	Rank^{1}	Seed
COL	Nicolás Mejía	245	1
BRA	João Lucas Reis da Silva	266	2
ARG	Lautaro Midón	285	3
BRA	Matheus Pucinelli de Almeida	286	4
ARG	Genaro Alberto Olivieri	390	5
ARG	Juan Bautista Torres	302	6
ARG	Renzo Olivo	306	7
PER	Gonzalo Bueno	310	8

- ^{1} Rankings are as of 16 June 2025.

=== Other entrants ===
The following players received wildcards into the singles main draw:

- (Peru) Nicolás Baena
- (Peru) Conner Huertas del Pino
- (Peru) Christopher Li

The following player received entry into the singles main draw using a protected ranking:

- (Jamaica) Blaise Bicknell

The following players received entry into the singles main draw as alternates:

- (Dominican Republic) Peter Bertran
- (Mexico) Alex Hernández

The following players received entry from the qualifying draw:

- (United States) Dali Blanch
- (United States) Bruno Kuzuhara
- (Brazil) Pedro Rodrigues
- (Colombia) Johan Alexander Rodríguez
- (Germany) John Sperle
- (Colombia) Miguel Tobón

== Champions ==
=== Singles ===
- (Bolivia) Juan Carlos Prado Ángelo def. (Peru) Gonzalo Bueno 6–4, 7–5.

=== Doubles ===
- (Bolivia) Boris Arias / (Bolivia) Federico Zeballos def. (United States) Sekou Bangoura / (Israel) Roy Stepanov 6–2, 1–6, [12–10].
