= 2017 Lima Challenger =

- Date: 23 October – 29 October
- Edition: 11th
- Surface: Clay
- Location: Lima, Peru

Champions

Singles
- (Austria) Gerald Melzer

Doubles
- (Mexico) Miguel Ángel Reyes-Varela / (Slovenia) Blaž Rola
- Lima Challenger

The 2017 Lima Challenger was a professional tennis tournament played on clay courts. It was the eleventh edition of the tournament which was part of the 2017 ATP Challenger Tour. It took place in Lima, Peru between October 23 and October 29, 2017.

== Singles main-draw entrants ==
=== Seeds ===
Country	Player	Rank^{1}	Seed
ARG	Federico Delbonis	69	1
DOM	Víctor Estrella Burgos	80	2
ARG	Nicolás Kicker	87	3
ESP	Roberto Carballés Baena	101	4
ITA	Marco Cecchinato	106	5
ARG	Carlos Berlocq	112	6
POR	Gastão Elias	116	7
NOR	Casper Ruud	134	8

- ^{1} Rankings are as of 16 October 2017.

=== Other entrants ===
The following players received wildcards into the singles main draw:

- (Peru) Nicolás Álvarez
- (Peru) Mauricio Echazú
- (Ecuador) Emilio Gómez
- (Peru) Juan Pablo Varillas

The following player received entry into the singles main draw using a protected ranking:

- (Spain) Daniel Muñoz de la Nava

The following players received entry from the qualifying draw:

- (Dominican Republic) José Hernández-Fernández
- (Bulgaria) Dimitar Kuzmanov
- (Ecuador) Roberto Quiroz
- (Slovenia) Blaž Rola

== Champions ==
=== Singles ===
- (Austria) Gerald Melzer def. (Slovakia) Jozef Kovalík 7–5, 7–6^{(7–4)}.

=== Doubles ===
- (Mexico) Miguel Ángel Reyes-Varela / (Slovenia) Blaž Rola def. (Portugal) Gonçalo Oliveira / (Poland) Grzegorz Panfil 7–5, 6–3.
