= 2017 Lima Challenger – Singles =

Singles
- 2017 Lima Challenger

Final
- Champion: (Austria) Gerald Melzer
- Runner-up: (Slovakia) Jozef Kovalík
- Score: 7–5, 7–6^{(7–4)}

Events
Singles	Doubles
- Lima Challenger

Christian Garín was the defending champion but lost in the second round to Gastão Elias.

Gerald Melzer won the title after defeating Jozef Kovalík 7–5, 7–6^{(7–4)} in the final.

== Seeds ==
1. (Argentina) Federico Delbonis (first round)
2. (Dominican Republic) Víctor Estrella Burgos (first round)
3. (Argentina) Nicolás Kicker (semifinals)
4. (Spain) Roberto Carballés Baena (second round)
5. (Italy) Marco Cecchinato (semifinals)
6. (Argentina) Carlos Berlocq (first round)
7. (Portugal) Gastão Elias (quarterfinals)
8. (Norway) Casper Ruud (first round)

== Draw ==
Key

- Q = Qualifier
- WC = Wild card
- LL = Lucky loser
- Alt = Alternate
- ITF = ITF entry
- PR = Protected ranking
- SR = Special ranking
- SE = Special exempt
- JE = Junior exempt
- JR = Junior Accelerator Programme entrant
- CO = College Accelerator Programme entrant
- NG = Next Gen Accelerator Program entrant
- w/o = Walkover
- r = Retired
- d = Defaulted

=== Finals ===
Semifinals
(Slovakia) Jozef Kovalík	6	6
5	(Italy) Marco Cecchinato	2	1
3	(Argentina) Nicolás Kicker	2	3
(Austria) Gerald Melzer	6	6

Final
(Slovakia) Jozef Kovalík	5	6^{4}
(Austria) Gerald Melzer	7	7^{7}

=== Top half ===
First round
1	(Argentina) F Delbonis	2	1
(Slovakia) A Martin	6	6
(Argentina) M González	5	2
PR	(Spain) D Muñoz de la Nava	7	6
(Spain) Í Cervantes	4	7^{7}	4
(Slovakia) J Kovalík	6	6^{4}	6
(Spain) R Ojeda Lara	6	2	6
6	(Argentina) C Berlocq	4	6	2
4	(Spain) R Carballés Baena	6	6
(Argentina) R Olivo	2	1
(El Salvador) M Arévalo	6^{2}	7	4
Q	(Bulgaria) D Kuzmanov	7^{7}	5	6
WC	(Ecuador) E Gómez	1	3
WC	(Peru) N Álvarez	6	6
WC	(Peru) JP Varillas	4	4
5	(Italy) M Cecchinato	6	6

Second round
(Slovakia) A Martin	6	6
PR	(Spain) D Muñoz de la Nava	4	2
(Slovakia) J Kovalík	6	6
(Spain) R Ojeda Lara	3	0
4	(Spain) R Carballés Baena	6^{6}	3
Q	(Bulgaria) D Kuzmanov	7^{8}	6
WC	(Peru) N Álvarez	3	2
5	(Italy) M Cecchinato	6	6

Quarterfinals
(Slovakia) A Martin	7	5	1^{r}
(Slovakia) J Kovalík	5	7	5
Q	(Bulgaria) D Kuzmanov	6^{3}	3
5	(Italy) M Cecchinato	7^{7}	6

Semifinals
(Slovakia) J Kovalík	6	6
5	(Italy) M Cecchinato	2	1

=== Bottom half ===
First round
7	(Portugal) G Elias	6	6
(Portugal) G Oliveira	1	3
(Chile) C Garín	6^{4}	6	6
Q	(Ecuador) R Quiroz	7^{7}	4	4
Q	(Slovenia) B Rola	7^{7}	6
(Brazil) G Clezar	6^{4}	0
(Portugal) J Domingues	0	1
3	(Argentina) N Kicker	6	6
8	(Norway) C Ruud	5	3
Q	(Dominican Republic) J Hernández-Fernández	7	6
(Spain) C Taberner	4	4
(Austria) G Melzer	6	6
(Spain) J Munar	6	6
WC	(Peru) M Echazú	1	4
(Argentina) F Bagnis	6	4	7
2	(Dominican Republic) V Estrella Burgos	2	6	5

Second round
7	(Portugal) G Elias	4	6	6
(Chile) C Garín	6	3	2
Q	(Slovenia) B Rola	4	7	2
3	(Argentina) N Kicker	6	5	6
Q	(Dominican Republic) J Hernández-Fernández	4	0
(Austria) G Melzer	6	6
(Spain) J Munar	1	7^{11}	4
(Argentina) F Bagnis	6	6^{9}	6

Quarterfinals
7	(Portugal) G Elias	5	1
3	(Argentina) N Kicker	7	6
(Austria) G Melzer	6	6
(Argentina) F Bagnis	3	4

Semifinals
3	(Argentina) N Kicker	2	3
(Austria) G Melzer	6	6
