= Duilio Vallebuona =

- Full name: Duilio Vallebuona Reyes
- Country (sports): Peru
- Born: 6 July 1992 (age 33) Lima, Peru
- Plays: Right-handed
- Prize money: $12,871

Singles
- Career record: 0–1
- Highest ranking: No. 971 (17 Mar 2014)

Doubles
- Career record: 0–1
- Highest ranking: No. 469 (2 Mar 2015)

Duilio Vallebuona Reyes (born 6 July 1992) is a Peruvian model, television personality and professional tennis player.

Vallebuona, winner of three ITF Futures doubles titles in 2014, made his Davis Cup debut for Peru in a 2015 tie against Chile in Santiago and was beaten in his singles rubber by Nicolás Jarry. He also featured in a 2016 tie versus Uruguay in Lima, which the Peruvians won.

Off the court, Vallebuona is a model and has appeared on Peruvian television as a reality contestant on Combate, a show featuring various physical and mental tests. He was Mister International Peru for 2018 and travelled to the Philippines to compete in the Mister International pageant. In 2024 it was announced that he would be on a new Willax program called Agricooltores, a program dedicated to agriculture and animal husbandry.

== ITF Futures finals ==
=== Doubles: 6 (3–3) ===
Result	W–L	Date	Tournament	Surface	Partner	Opponents	Score
Loss	0–1	Mar 2014	Peru F2, Lima	Clay	(Bolivia) Alejandro Mendoza	(Argentina) Federico Coria (Spain) Marc Giner	2–6, 6–3, [5–10]
Win	1–1	Apr 2014	Colombia F1, Pereira	Clay	(Bolivia) Federico Zeballos	(Colombia) Felipe Mantilla (Colombia) Eduardo Struvay	6–3, 7–6^{(5)}
Loss	1–2	Jul 2014	Mexico F8, Quintana Roo	Hard	(Mexico) Lucas Gómez	(Peru) Mauricio Echazú (Peru) Jorge Panta	1–6, 6–7^{(1)}
Loss	1–3	Jul 2014	Venezuela F2, Valencia	Hard	(Peru) Jorge Panta	(Argentina) Mateo Nicolas Martinez (Mexico) Luis Patiño	2–6, 4–6
Win	2–3	Sep 2014	Bolivia F1, Cochabamba	Clay	(Argentina) Franco Feitt	(Brazil) Augusto Laranja (Brazil) Alexandre Tsuchiya	6–2, 7–6^{(3)}
Win	3–3	Sep 2014	Bolivia F2, La Paz	Clay	(Argentina) Franco Feitt	(Guatemala) Christopher Díaz Figueroa (Mexico) Luis Patiño	7–5, 6–0

== See also ==
- List of Peru Davis Cup team representatives
