= Michael Linzer =

Austrian tennis player

- Country (sports): Austria
- Residence: Bad Erlach, Austria
- Born: 2 November 1989 (age 36) Oberpullendorf, Austria
- Height: 1.83 m (6 ft 0 in)
- Turned pro: 2006
- Plays: Right-handed (two-handed backhand)
- Prize money: US$159,549

Singles
- Career record: 0–2 (ATP Tour and Grand Slam main draws, and in Davis Cup)
- Career titles: 0
- Highest ranking: No. 236 (20 August 2012)

Grand Slam singles results
- Australian Open: Q1 (2016)

Doubles
- Career record: 0–0 (ATP Tour and Grand Slam main drawes, and in Davis Cup)
- Career titles: 0; 1 Challenger
- Highest ranking: No. 380 (30 July 2012)

Michael Linzer (German: [ˈlɪntsɐ]; born 2 November 1989) is an Austrian professional tennis player and competes mainly on the ATP Challenger Tour and ITF Futures, both in singles and doubles.

Linzer reached his highest ATP singles ranking, No. 236 on 20 August 2012, and his highest ATP doubles ranking, No. 380, on 30 July 2012. He made his ATP main draw debut at the 2016 Romanian Open.

== ATP career finals (1) ==
=== Doubles (1) ===
Legend
ATP Challengers (1)

Finals by surface
Hard (0–0)
Clay (1–0)
Grass (0–0)
Carpet (0–0)

Outcome	No.	Date	Tournament	Surface	Partnering	Opponents in the final	Score
Winners	1.	29 July 2012	Tampere, Finland	Clay	(Austria) Gerald Melzer	(Belgium) Niels Desein (Brazil) André Ghem	6–1, 7–6^{(7–3)}
