= Cristóbal Saavedra Corvalán =

Chilean tennis player

Cristóbal Saavedra
- Full name: Cristóbal Saavedra Corvalán
- Country (sports): Chile
- Residence: Santiago, Chile
- Born: August 1, 1990 (age 35) La Ligua, Chile
- Turned pro: 2007
- Retired: 2020
- Plays: Right-handed (two-handed backhand)
- Prize money: $136,667

Singles
- Career record: 0–2 (at ATP Tour level, Grand Slam level, and in Davis Cup)
- Career titles: 0
- Highest ranking: No. 284 (November 21, 2011)

Doubles
- Career record: 0–0
- Career titles: 0
- Highest ranking: No. 230 (October 24, 2011)
- Last updated on: 1 January 2019.

Cristóbal Saavedra Corvalán (Spanish pronunciation: [kɾisˈtoβal saˈβeðɾa koɾβaˈlan]; born August 1, 1990, in La Ligua, Chile) is a Chilean former tennis player.

== ATP Challenger & ITF Futures ==
=== Singles Titles (0) ===
Legend
ATP Challenger Series
ITF Futures Series (0)

=== Singles runner-up (2) ===
No.	Date	Tournament	Surface	Opponent	Score
1.	19 October 2009	Chile F2 Futures, Chile	Clay	(Italy) Antonio Comporto	2–6, 5–7
2.	26 November 2009	Chile F4 Futures, Chile	Clay	(Chile) Jorge Aguilar	7–6^{(12–10)}, 3–6, 3–6
