= Rodrigo Sánchez (tennis) =

Peruvian tennis player

- Country (sports): Peru
- Born: 19 September 1991 (age 33); Lima, Peru
- Plays: Right-handed (two-handed backhand)
- Prize money: $24,057

Singles
- Career record: 0–0 (at ATP Tour level, Grand Slam level, and in Davis Cup)
- Career titles: 0 ITF
- Highest ranking: No. 633 (18 August 2014)

Doubles
- Career record: 0–1 (at ATP Tour level, Grand Slam level, and in Davis Cup)
- Career titles: 6 ITF
- Highest ranking: No. 428 (13 October 2014)
- Last updated on: 21 October 2019.

Rodrigo Sánchez (born 19 September 1991) is a Peruvian tennis player.

Sánchez has a career high ATP singles ranking of 633 achieved on 18 August 2014. He also has a career high ATP doubles ranking of 428 achieved on 13 October 2014.

Sánchez represents Peru at the Davis Cup, where he has a W/L record of 0–1.
