= Lima Challenger =

- 2025 Lima Challenger

ATP Challenger Tour
- Event name: Igma Open
- Location: Lima, Peru
- Venue: Club Tennis Las Terrazas de Miraflores; Jockey Club del Perú
- Category: ATP Challenger Tour
- Surface: Clay (red)
- Prize money: $100,000 (2nd edition), $60,000+H (1st edition)
- Website: igmasports.com

Current champions (2025)
- Singles: (Chile) Tomás Barrios Vera
- Doubles: (Brazil) Marcelo Demoliner (Brazil) Orlando Luz

The Igma Open (previously the DirecTV Open Lima) is a professional tennis tournament played on outdoor red clay courts. It is currently part of the ATP Challenger Tour and is held annually in Lima, Peru, since 2000. As of 2024 (in its 13th edition since 2012), it is the fourth longest running active South American Challenger tournament, only behind Montevideo (20), Guayaquil (20), Santiago (18), and tied with Campinas (13).

== Past finals ==
=== Singles ===
Year	Champion	Runner-up	Score
2026	(Spain) Nikolás Sánchez Izquierdo	(Uruguay) Franco Roncadelli	7–6^{(7–4)}, 7–5
2025 (2)	(Chile) Tomás Barrios Vera	(Brazil) João Lucas Reis da Silva	7–6^{(7–5)}, 7–6^{(7–3)}
2025 (1)	(Bolivia) Juan Carlos Prado Ángelo	(Peru) Gonzalo Bueno	6–4, 7–5
2024 (2)	(Czech Republic) Vít Kopřiva	(Denmark) Elmer Møller	6–3, 7–6^{(7–3)}
2024 (1)	(Argentina) Juan Manuel Cerúndolo	(Brazil) Pedro Boscardin Dias	6–4, 6–3
2023 (2)	(Italy) Luciano Darderi	(Argentina) Mariano Navone	4–6, 6–3, 7–5
2023 (1)	(Ecuador) Álvaro Guillén Meza	(Jamaica) Blaise Bicknell	7–6^{(7–3)}, 6–1
2022 (2)	(Germany) Daniel Altmaier	(Argentina) Tomás Martín Etcheverry	6–1, 6–7^{(4–7)}, 6–4
2022 (1)	(Argentina) Camilo Ugo Carabelli	(Argentina) Thiago Agustín Tirante	6–2, 7–6^{(7–4)}
2021 (2)	(Chile) Nicolás Jarry	(Argentina) Juan Manuel Cerúndolo	6–2, 7–5
2021 (1)	(Bolivia) Hugo Dellien	(Argentina) Camilo Ugo Carabelli	6–3, 7–5
2020	(Colombia) Daniel Elahi Galán	(Argentina) Thiago Agustín Tirante	6–1, 3–6, 6–3
2019	(Brazil) Thiago Monteiro	(Argentina) Federico Coria	6–2, 6–7^{(7–9)}, 6–4
2018	(Chile) Christian Garín	(Portugal) Pedro Sousa	6–4, 6–4
2017	(Austria) Gerald Melzer	(Slovakia) Jozef Kovalík	7–5, 7–6^{(7–4)}
2016	(Chile) Christian Garín	(Argentina) Guido Andreozzi	3–6, 7–5, 7–6^{(7–3)}
2015	(Portugal) Gastão Elias	(Slovakia) Andrej Martin	6–2, 7–6^{(7–4)}
2014	(Argentina) Guido Pella	(Australia) Jason Kubler	6–2, 6–4
2013	(Argentina) Horacio Zeballos	(Argentina) Facundo Bagnis	6–7^{(4–7)}, 6–3, 6–3
2012	(Argentina) Guido Andreozzi	(Argentina) Facundo Argüello	6–3, 6–7^{(6–8)}, 6–2
2011	Not Held		
2010	Not Held		
2009	(Argentina) Eduardo Schwank	(Chile) Jorge Aguilar	7–5, 6–4
2008	(Argentina) Martín Vassallo Argüello	(Argentina) Sergio Roitman	6–2, 4–6, 6–4
2007	(Uruguay) Pablo Cuevas	(Brazil) Marcos Daniel	0–6, 6–4, 6–3
2006 - 2002	Not Held		
2001	(Argentina) Juan Ignacio Chela	(Brazil) Marcos Daniel	6–2, 1–0 ret.
2000	(Argentina) Guillermo Coria	(Costa Rica) Juan Antonio Marín	6–0, 7–6(7)

=== Doubles ===
Year	Champions	Runners-up	Score
2026	(Argentina) Facundo Bagnis (Argentina) Facundo Mena	(Poland) Karol Drzewiecki (Poland) Piotr Matuszewski	4–6, 6–4, [10–3]
2025 (2)	(Brazil) Marcelo Demoliner (Brazil) Orlando Luz	(Colombia) Cristian Rodríguez (Bolivia) Federico Zeballos	2–6, 7–6^{(7–3)}, [10–8]
2025 (1)	(Bolivia) Boris Arias (Bolivia) Federico Zeballos	(United States) Sekou Bangoura (Israel) Roy Stepanov	6–2, 1–6, [12–10]
2024 (2)	(Poland) Karol Drzewiecki (Poland) Piotr Matuszewski	(Brazil) Luís Britto (Brazil) Gustavo Heide	7–5, 6–4
2024 (1)	(Lebanon) Hady Habib (United States) Trey Hilderbrand	(Brazil) Pedro Boscardin Dias (Brazil) Pedro Sakamoto	7–5, 6–3
2023 (2)	(Brazil) Mateus Alves (Brazil) Eduardo Ribeiro	(Colombia) Nicolás Barrientos (Brazil) Orlando Luz	3–6, 7–5, [10–8]
2023 (1)	(Peru) Gonzalo Bueno (Paraguay) Daniel Vallejo	(Peru) Ignacio Buse (Peru) Jorge Panta	6–4, 6–2
2022 (2)	(Netherlands) Jesper de Jong (Netherlands) Max Houkes	(Argentina) Guido Andreozzi (Argentina) Guillermo Durán	7–6^{(8–6)}, 3–6, [12–10]
2022 (1)	(Uruguay) Ignacio Carou (Argentina) Facundo Mena	(Brazil) Orlando Luz (Argentina) Camilo Ugo Carabelli	6–2, 6–2
2021 (2)	(Peru) Sergio Galdós (Portugal) Gonçalo Oliveira	(Chile) Marcelo Tomás Barrios Vera (Chile) Alejandro Tabilo	6–2, 2–6, [10–5]
2021 (1)	(Germany) Julian Lenz (Austria) Gerald Melzer	(Colombia) Nicolás Barrientos (Brazil) Fernando Romboli	7–6^{(7–4)}, 7–6^{(7–3)}
2020	(Spain) Íñigo Cervantes (Spain) Oriol Roca Batalla	(United States) Collin Altamirano (Ukraine) Vitaliy Sachko	6–3, 6–4
2019	(Uruguay) Ariel Behar (Ecuador) Gonzalo Escobar	(Venezuela) Luis David Martínez (Brazil) Felipe Meligeni Alves	6–2, 2–6, [10–3]
2018	(Argentina) Guido Andreozzi (Argentina) Guillermo Durán	(Uruguay) Ariel Behar (Ecuador) Gonzalo Escobar	2–6, 7–6^{(7–5)}, [10–5]
2017	(Mexico) Miguel Ángel Reyes-Varela (Slovenia) Blaž Rola	(Portugal) Gonçalo Oliveira (Poland) Grzegorz Panfil	7–5, 6–3
2016	(Peru) Sergio Galdós (Argentina) Leonardo Mayer	(Uruguay) Ariel Behar (Chile) Gonzalo Lama	6–2, 7–6^{(9–7)}
2015	(Slovakia) Andrej Martin (Chile) Hans Podlipnik	(Brazil) Rogério Dutra Silva (Brazil) João Souza	6–3, 6–4
2014	(Peru) Sergio Galdós (Argentina) Guido Pella	(Brazil) Marcelo Demoliner (Venezuela) Roberto Maytín	6–3, 6–1
2013	(Argentina) Andrés Molteni (Brazil) Fernando Romboli	(Brazil) Marcelo Demoliner (Peru) Sergio Galdós	6–4, 6–4
2012	(Argentina) Facundo Argüello (Argentina) Agustín Velotti	(Italy) Claudio Grassi (Italy) Luca Vanni	7–6^{(7–4)}, 7–6^{(7–5)}
2011	Not Held		
2010	Not Held		
2009	(Argentina) Martín Alund (Argentina) Juan-Martín Aranguren	(Chile) Cristóbal Saavedra-Corvalán (Chile) Guillermo Rivera Aránguiz	6–4, 6–4
2008	(Peru) Luis Horna (Argentina) Sebastián Prieto	(Paraguay) Ramón Delgado (Brazil) Júlio Silva	6–4, 6–4
2007	(Uruguay) Pablo Cuevas (Argentina) Eduardo Schwank	(Uruguay) Martín Vilarrubí (Colombia) Michael Quintero	6–4, 6–2
2006 - 2002	Not Held		
2001	(Italy) Enzo Artoni (Brazil) Daniel Melo	(Argentina) José Acasuso (Argentina) Martín Vassallo Argüello	6–2, 1–6, 7–6(7)
2000	(Argentina) Gastón Etlis (Argentina) Martín Rodríguez	(Argentina) Juan Ignacio Chela (Peru) Luis Horna	6–2, 5–2, ret.
