= 2023 Challenger AAT – Singles =

Singles
- 2023 Challenger AAT

Final
- Champion: (Brazil) Thiago Seyboth Wild
- Runner-up: (Italy) Luciano Darderi
- Score: 6–3, 6–3

Events
Singles	Doubles
← 2022 ·	Challenger AAT	· 2024 →

Francisco Comesaña was the defending champion but lost in the second round to Andrea Collarini.

Thiago Seyboth Wild won the title after defeating Luciano Darderi 6–3, 6–3 in the final.

== Seeds ==
1. (Argentina) Andrea Collarini (semifinals)
2. (Argentina) Thiago Agustín Tirante (withdrew)
3. (Italy) Luciano Darderi (final)
4. (Argentina) Juan Pablo Ficovich (first round)
5. (Argentina) Genaro Alberto Olivieri (withdrew)
6. (Dominican Republic) Nick Hardt (second round)
7. (Argentina) Mariano Navone (semifinals)
8. (Brazil) Thiago Seyboth Wild (champion)

== Draw ==
=== Key ===
- Q = Qualifier
- WC = Wild card
- LL = Lucky loser
- Alt = Alternate
- ITF = ITF entry
- PR = Protected ranking
- SR = Special ranking
- SE = Special exempt
- JE = Junior exempt
- JR = Junior Accelerator Programme entrant
- CO = College Accelerator Programme entrant
- NG = Next Gen Accelerator Program entrant
- w/o = Walkover
- r = Retired
- d = Defaulted

=== Finals ===
Semifinals
1	(Argentina) Andrea Collarini	6	6^{5}	2
3	(Italy) Luciano Darderi	4	7^{7}	6
8	(Brazil) Thiago Seyboth Wild	6	6
7	(Argentina) Mariano Navone	2	3

Final
3	(Italy) Luciano Darderi	3	3
8	(Brazil) Thiago Seyboth Wild	6	6

=== Top half ===
First round
1	(Argentina) A Collarini	6	6
(Brazil) D Dutra da Silva	4	2
(Brazil) M Pucinelli de Almeida	4	2
(Argentina) F Comesaña	6	6
Alt	(Chile) G Lama	6^{6}	6^{2}
(Argentina) G Villanueva	7^{8}	7^{7}
WC	(Argentina) L Midón	4	4
6	(Dominican Republic) N Hardt	6	6
3	(Italy) L Darderi	6	6
(France) M Janvier	3	4
Alt	(Argentina) Juan Bautista Otegui	4	2
Q	(Peru) C Huertas del Pino	6	6
(Argentina) S Rodríguez Taverna	6	6
WC	(Argentina) A Barrena	0	4
Q	(Argentina) V Aboian	3	6	3
LL	(Brazil) J Pereira	6	1	0^{r}

Second round
1	(Argentina) A Collarini	6	6
(Argentina) F Comesaña	3	4
(Argentina) G Villanueva	7	1	7
6	(Dominican Republic) N Hardt	5	6	5
3	(Italy) L Darderi	6	6
Q	(Peru) C Huertas del Pino	2	0
(Argentina) S Rodríguez Taverna	6	6
Q	(Argentina) V Aboian	3	4

Quarterfinals
1	(Argentina) A Collarini	6	6
(Argentina) G Villanueva	2	1
3	(Italy) L Darderi	6	6
(Argentina) S Rodríguez Taverna	3	2

Semifinals
1	(Argentina) A Collarini	6	6^{5}	2
3	(Italy) L Darderi	4	7^{7}	6

=== Bottom half ===
First round
8	(Brazil) T Seyboth Wild	6	4	6
(Lebanon) B Hassan	2	6	3
LL	(Brazil) Wilson Leite	3	2
(Bolivia) M Dellien	6	6
Alt	(Brazil) P Boscardin Dias	1	3
(Argentina) H Casanova	6	6
(Brazil) JL Reis da Silva	6	7
4	(Argentina) JP Ficovich	2	5
7	(Argentina) M Navone	6	6
WC	(Argentina) AL Lingua Lavallén	3	2
(Argentina) JB Torres	6	6
Q	(Argentina) Matías Zukas	2	1
Q	(Argentina) Tomás Farjat	2	1
(Argentina) RA Burruchaga	6	6
Q	(Brazil) G Heide	6	6
Q	(Argentina) M Kestelboim	4	3

Second round
8	(Brazil) T Seyboth Wild	6	3	6
(Bolivia) M Dellien	1	6	1
(Argentina) H Casanova	6	6^{1}	6
(Brazil) JL Reis da Silva	1	7^{7}	4
7	(Argentina) M Navone	7	0	7
(Argentina) JB Torres	5	6	5
(Argentina) RA Burruchaga	6	6
Q	(Brazil) G Heide	1	2

Quarterfinals
8	(Brazil) T Seyboth Wild	6	6
(Argentina) H Casanova	3	2
7	(Argentina) M Navone	6	7^{7}
(Argentina) RA Burruchaga	3	6^{2}

Semifinals
8	(Brazil) T Seyboth Wild	6	6
7	(Argentina) M Navone	2	3
