= 2024 Challenger AAT II – Doubles =

Doubles
- 2024 Challenger AAT II

Final
- Champions: (Brazil) João Fonseca (Brazil) Pedro Sakamoto
- Runners-up: (Germany) Jakob Schnaitter (Germany) Mark Wallner
- Score: 6–2, 6–2

Events
| Singles | Doubles |
- Challenger AAT

Arklon and Conner Huertas del Pino were the defending champions but lost in the quarterfinals to Jakob Schnaitter and Mark Wallner.

João Fonseca and Pedro Sakamoto won the title after defeating Schnaitter and Wallner 6–2, 6–2 in the final.

== Seeds ==
1. (Bolivia) Boris Arias / (Bolivia) Federico Zeballos (semifinals)
2. (Brazil) Orlando Luz / (Brazil) Marcelo Zormann (first round)
3. (Peru) Arklon Huertas del Pino / (Peru) Conner Huertas del Pino (quarterfinals)
4. (Brazil) Mateus Alves / (Brazil) Gustavo Heide (first round)

== Draw ==
Key

- Q = Qualifier
- WC = Wild card
- LL = Lucky loser
- Alt = Alternate
- ITF = ITF entry
- PR = Protected ranking
- SR = Special ranking
- SE = Special exempt
- JE = Junior exempt
- JR = Junior Accelerator Programme entrant
- CO = College Accelerator Programme entrant
- NG = Next Gen Accelerator Program entrant
- w/o = Walkover
- r = Retired
- d = Defaulted

First round
1 | (Bolivia) B Arias (Bolivia) F Zeballos | 6^{3} | 6 | [10]
(Bolivia) M Dellien (Argentina) M Kestelboim | 7^{7} | 1 | [8]
(Italy) Edoardo Lavagno (Spain) N Sánchez Izquierdo | 5 | 4
(Canada) L Draxl (Switzerland) D Wenger | 7 | 6
3 | (Peru) A Huertas del Pino (Peru) C Huertas del Pino | 6 | 2 | [10]
WC | (Argentina) A Barrena (Argentina) MF Descotte | 1 | 6 | [7]
(Uruguay) I Carou (Argentina) H Casanova | 5 | 1
(Germany) J Schnaitter (Germany) M Wallner | 7 | 6
(Argentina) JP Paz (Argentina) G Villanueva | 6 | 3 | [5]
WC | (Argentina) Ignacio Monzón (Spain) C Sánchez Jover | 4 | 6 | [10]
(Ukraine) O Krutykh (Germany) Timo Stodder | 7^{7} | 2 | [10]
4 | (Brazil) M Alves (Brazil) G Heide | 6^{5} | 6 | [8]
(Brazil) Gilbert Klier Júnior (Brazil) JL Reis da Silva | 7^{7} | 6
(Argentina) FA Gómez (Argentina) JB Torres | 6^{1} | 2
Alt | (Brazil) J Fonseca (Brazil) P Sakamoto | 6 | 3 | [11]
2 | (Brazil) O Luz (Brazil) M Zormann | 3 | 6 | [9]

Quarterfinals
1 | (Bolivia) B Arias (Bolivia) F Zeballos | 6 | 7
(Canada) L Draxl (Switzerland) D Wenger | 4 | 5
3 | (Peru) A Huertas del Pino (Peru) C Huertas del Pino | 3 | 6 | [9]
(Germany) J Schnaitter (Germany) M Wallner | 6 | 3 | [11]
WC | (Argentina) I Monzón (Spain) C Sánchez Jover | 6 | 6^{3} | [14]
(Ukraine) O Krutykh (Germany) T Stodder | 4 | 7^{7} | [12]
(Brazil) G Klier Júnior (Brazil) JL Reis da Silva | 1 | 6^{4}
Alt | (Brazil) J Fonseca (Brazil) P Sakamoto | 6 | 7^{7}

Semifinals
1 | (Bolivia) B Arias (Bolivia) F Zeballos | 3 | 6^{6}
(Germany) J Schnaitter (Germany) M Wallner | 6 | 7^{8}
WC | (Argentina) I Monzón (Spain) C Sánchez Jover | 6 | 3 | [7]
Alt | (Brazil) J Fonseca (Brazil) P Sakamoto | 3 | 6 | [10]

Final
(Germany) J Schnaitter (Germany) M Wallner | 2 | 2
Alt | (Brazil) J Fonseca (Brazil) P Sakamoto | 6 | 6
