= 2022 Challenger Tenis Club Argentino – Doubles =

Doubles
- 2022 Challenger Tenis Club Argentino

Final
- Champions: (Peru) Arklon Huertas del Pino (Peru) Conner Huertas del Pino
- Runners-up: (Argentina) Matías Franco Descotte (Argentina) Alejo Lorenzo Lingua Lavallén
- Score: 7–5, 4–6, [11–9]

Events
Singles	Doubles
- Challenger Tenis Club Argentino

This was the first edition of the tournament. The tournament was originally scheduled to be played in Villa Allende but was relocated to Buenos Aires due to operational issues at the venue in Villa Allende.

Arklon and Conner Huertas del Pino won the title after defeating Matías Franco Descotte and Alejo Lorenzo Lingua Lavallén 7–5, 4–6, [11–9] in the final.

== Seeds ==
1. (Argentina) Guido Andreozzi / (Argentina) Guillermo Durán (quarterfinals, withdrew)
2. (Spain) Carlos Gómez-Herrera / (Tunisia) Malek Jaziri (quarterfinals, withdrew)
3. (Peru) Arklon Huertas del Pino / (Peru) Conner Huertas del Pino (champions)
4. (Argentina) Román Andrés Burruchaga / (Argentina) Francisco Comesaña (withdrew)

== Draw ==
Key

- Q = Qualifier
- WC = Wild card
- LL = Lucky loser
- Alt = Alternate
- ITF = ITF entry
- PR = Protected ranking
- SR = Special ranking
- SE = Special exempt
- JE = Junior exempt
- JR = Junior Accelerator Programme entrant
- CO = College Accelerator Programme entrant
- NG = Next Gen Accelerator Program entrant
- w/o = Walkover
- r = Retired
- d = Defaulted

First round
1	(Argentina) G Andreozzi (Argentina) G Durán	6	4	[10]
(Argentina) S de la Fuente (Argentina) Facundo Juárez	2	6	[2]
(Argentina) Leonardo Aboian (Argentina) V Aboian	5	4
(Uruguay) I Carou (Argentina) G Villanueva	7	6
3	(Peru) A Huertas del Pino (Peru) C Huertas del Pino	6	6
WC	(Argentina) Juan Cruz Estevarena (Argentina) Santiago Giamichelle	1	2
(Argentina) A Barrena (Argentina) Mateo Nicolás Martínez	6	6
(Argentina) Juan Ignacio Galarza (Argentina) M Navone	1	4
WC	(Argentina) Nicolás Eli (Argentina) Juan Bautista Otegui	0	3
(Peru) N Álvarez (Bolivia) M Dellien	6	6
(Argentina) MF Descotte (Argentina) AL Lingua Lavallén	6	6
(Argentina) Ignacio Monzón (Argentina) Fermín Tenti	4	1
(Argentina) Tomás Farjat (Peru) J Panta	4	6	[8]
2	(Spain) C Gómez-Herrera (Tunisia) M Jaziri	6	3	[10]

Quarterfinals
1	(Argentina) G Andreozzi (Argentina) G Durán
(Uruguay) I Carou (Argentina) G Villanueva	w/o
3	(Peru) A Huertas del Pino (Peru) C Huertas del Pino	w/o
(Argentina) A Barrena (Argentina) MN Martínez
(Peru) N Álvarez (Bolivia) M Dellien	w/o
(United Kingdom) Blu Baker (Colombia) N Mejía
(Argentina) MF Descotte (Argentina) AL Lingua Lavallén	w/o
2	(Spain) C Gómez-Herrera (Tunisia) M Jaziri

Semifinals
(Uruguay) I Carou (Argentina) G Villanueva
3	(Peru) A Huertas del Pino (Peru) C Huertas del Pino	w/o
(Peru) N Álvarez (Bolivia) M Dellien	4	6	[4]
(Argentina) MF Descotte (Argentina) AL Lingua Lavallén	6	1	[10]

Final
3	(Peru) A Huertas del Pino (Peru) C Huertas del Pino	7	4	[11]
(Argentina) MF Descotte (Argentina) AL Lingua Lavallén	5	6	[9]
