= 2024 Challenger AAT – Doubles =

Doubles
- 2024 Challenger AAT

Final
- Champions: (Peru) Arklon Huertas del Pino (Peru) Conner Huertas del Pino
- Runners-up: (Netherlands) Max Houkes (Austria) Lukas Neumayer
- Score: 6–3, 3–6, [10–6]

Events
Singles	Doubles
- Challenger AAT

Francisco Comesaña and Thiago Seyboth Wild were the defending champions but chose not to defend their title.

Arklon and Conner Huertas del Pino won the title after defeating Max Houkes and Lukas Neumayer 6–3, 3–6, [10–6] in the final.

== Seeds ==
1. (Bolivia) Boris Arias / (Bolivia) Federico Zeballos (first round)
2. (Brazil) Orlando Luz / (Brazil) Marcelo Zormann (quarterfinals)
3. (Peru) Arklon Huertas del Pino / (Peru) Conner Huertas del Pino (champions)
4. (Brazil) Mateus Alves / (Brazil) João Lucas Reis da Silva (first round)

== Draw ==
Key

- Q = Qualifier
- WC = Wild card
- LL = Lucky loser
- Alt = Alternate
- ITF = ITF entry
- PR = Protected ranking
- SR = Special ranking
- SE = Special exempt
- JE = Junior exempt
- JR = Junior Accelerator Programme entrant
- CO = College Accelerator Programme entrant
- NG = Next Gen Accelerator Program entrant
- w/o = Walkover
- r = Retired
- d = Defaulted

First round
1	(Bolivia) B Arias (Bolivia) F Zeballos	6	1	[1]
WC	(Argentina) LE Ambrogi (Argentina) L Midón	2	6	[10]
(Argentina) R Olivo (Spain) N Sánchez Izquierdo	6	0
(Ukraine) O Krutykh (Germany) Timo Stodder	3	0^{r}
4	(Brazil) M Alves (Brazil) JL Reis da Silva	4	7	[6]
(Bolivia) M Dellien (Argentina) M Kestelboim	6	5	[10]
Alt	(Argentina) Ignacio Monzón (Spain) C Sánchez Jover	4	7^{10}	[9]
(Netherlands) M Houkes (Austria) L Neumayer	6	6^{8}	[11]
(Argentina) JP Paz (Argentina) G Villanueva	7^{8}	6
WC	(Argentina) Leonardo Aboian (Argentina) V Aboian	6^{6}	3
(Italy) Edoardo Lavagno (Italy) Alexander Weis	2	6^{2}
3	(Peru) A Huertas del Pino (Peru) C Huertas del Pino	6	7^{7}
(Canada) L Draxl (Switzerland) D Wenger	3	4
(Germany) J Schnaitter (Germany) M Wallner	6	6
(Uruguay) I Carou (Argentina) H Casanova	6^{4}	6	[9]
2	(Brazil) O Luz (Brazil) M Zormann	7^{7}	3	[11]

Quarterfinals
WC	(Argentina) LE Ambrogi (Argentina) L Midón	6^{6}	3
(Argentina) R Olivo (Spain) N Sánchez Izquierdo	7^{8}	6
(Bolivia) M Dellien (Argentina) M Kestelboim	4	5
(Netherlands) M Houkes (Austria) L Neumayer	6	7
(Argentina) JP Paz (Argentina) G Villanueva	7^{7}	4	[7]
3	(Peru) A Huertas del Pino (Peru) C Huertas del Pino	6^{1}	6	[10]
(Germany) J Schnaitter (Germany) M Wallner	1	6	[10]
2	(Brazil) O Luz (Brazil) M Zormann	6	3	[8]

Semifinals
(Argentina) R Olivo (Spain) N Sánchez Izquierdo	4	2
(Netherlands) M Houkes (Austria) L Neumayer	6	6
3	(Peru) A Huertas del Pino (Peru) C Huertas del Pino	6	7
(Germany) J Schnaitter (Germany) M Wallner	4	5

Final
(Netherlands) M Houkes (Austria) L Neumayer	3	6	[6]
3	(Peru) A Huertas del Pino (Peru) C Huertas del Pino	6	3	[10]
