= 2023 Challenger AAT – Doubles =

Doubles
- 2023 Challenger AAT

Final
- Champions: (Argentina) Francisco Comesaña (Brazil) Thiago Seyboth Wild
- Runners-up: (Argentina) Hernán Casanova (Argentina) Santiago Rodríguez Taverna
- Score: 6–3, 6–7^{(5–7)}, [10–6]

Events
Singles	Doubles
- Challenger AAT

Arklon and Conner Huertas del Pino were the defending champions but lost in the semifinals to Francisco Comesaña and Thiago Seyboth Wild.

Comesaña and Seyboth Wild won the title after defeating Hernán Casanova and Santiago Rodríguez Taverna 6–3, 6–7^{(5–7)}, [10–6] in the final.

== Seeds ==
1. (Argentina) Hernán Casanova / (Argentina) Santiago Rodríguez Taverna (final)
2. (Peru) Arklon Huertas del Pino / (Peru) Conner Huertas del Pino (semifinals)
3. (Argentina) Leonardo Aboian / (Argentina) Ignacio Monzón (first round)
4. (Argentina) Francisco Comesaña / (Brazil) Thiago Seyboth Wild (champions)

== Draw ==
Key

- Q = Qualifier
- WC = Wild card
- LL = Lucky loser
- Alt = Alternate
- ITF = ITF entry
- PR = Protected ranking
- SR = Special ranking
- SE = Special exempt
- JE = Junior exempt
- JR = Junior Accelerator Programme entrant
- CO = College Accelerator Programme entrant
- NG = Next Gen Accelerator Program entrant
- w/o = Walkover
- r = Retired
- d = Defaulted

First round
1	(Argentina) H Casanova (Argentina) S Rodríguez Taverna	6	7
(Brazil) P Boscardin Dias (Brazil) G Heide	3	5
(Brazil) M Pucinelli de Almeida (Brazil) JL Reis da Silva	6	6
(Brazil) Wilson Leite (Argentina) G Villanueva	0	2
3	(Argentina) Leonardo Aboian (Argentina) Ignacio Monzón	3	4
(Brazil) D Dutra da Silva (Chile) G Lama	6	6
(France) M Janvier (Brazil) J Pereira	6	7^{9}
WC	(Italy) Facundo Juárez (Argentina) Juan Bautista Otegui	0	6^{7}
(Argentina) Juan Ignacio Galarza (Argentina) T Lipovšek Puches	2^{r}
(Uruguay) I Carou (Argentina) Matías Zukas	5
(Japan) N Nakagawa (Peru) J Panta	1	4
4	(Argentina) F Comesaña (Brazil) T Seyboth Wild	6	6
(Argentina) V Aboian (Bolivia) M Dellien	4	6	[10]
WC	(Argentina) A Barrena (Argentina) S de la Fuente	6	2	[6]
(Argentina) RA Burruchaga (Argentina) Tomás Farjat	6^{2}	3
2	(Peru) A Huertas del Pino (Peru) C Huertas del Pino	7^{7}	6

Quarterfinals
1	(Argentina) H Casanova (Argentina) S Rodríguez Taverna	6	6
(Brazil) M Pucinelli de Almeida (Brazil) JL Reis da Silva	4	0
(Brazil) D Dutra da Silva (Chile) G Lama	6	4	[10]
(France) M Janvier (Brazil) J Pereira	3	6	[8]
(Uruguay) I Carou (Argentina) M Zukas	3	5
4	(Argentina) F Comesaña (Brazil) T Seyboth Wild	6	7
(Argentina) V Aboian (Bolivia) M Dellien	2	3
2	(Peru) A Huertas del Pino (Peru) C Huertas del Pino	6	6

Semifinals
1	(Argentina) H Casanova (Argentina) S Rodríguez Taverna	5	7^{7}	[11]
(Brazil) D Dutra da Silva (Chile) G Lama	7	6^{4}	[9]
4	(Argentina) F Comesaña (Brazil) T Seyboth Wild	6	6
2	(Peru) A Huertas del Pino (Peru) C Huertas del Pino	2	4

Final
1	(Argentina) H Casanova (Argentina) S Rodríguez Taverna	3	7^{7}	[6]
4	(Argentina) F Comesaña (Brazil) T Seyboth Wild	6	6^{5}	[10]
