= 2022 Challenger Tenis Club Argentino – Singles =

Singles
- 2022 Challenger Tenis Club Argentino

Final
- Champion: (Argentina) Francisco Comesaña
- Runner-up: (Argentina) Mariano Navone
- Score: 6–4, 6–0

Events
| Singles | Doubles |
- Challenger Tenis Club Argentino

This was the first edition of the tournament. The tournament was originally scheduled to be played in Villa Allende but was relocated to Buenos Aires due to operational issues at the venue in Villa Allende.

Francisco Comesaña won the title after defeating Mariano Navone 6–4, 6–0 in the final.

== Seeds ==
1. (Argentina) Juan Pablo Ficovich (quarterfinals)
2. (Brazil) Felipe Meligeni Alves (semifinals)
3. (Argentina) Francisco Comesaña (champion)
4. (Argentina) Gonzalo Villanueva (quarterfinals)
5. (Ecuador) Roberto Quiroz (second round)
6. (Dominican Republic) Nick Hardt (second round)
7. (Tunisia) Malek Jaziri (semifinals)
8. (Colombia) Nicolás Mejía (first round)

== Draw ==
Key

- Q = Qualifier
- WC = Wild card
- LL = Lucky loser
- Alt = Alternate
- ITF = ITF entry
- PR = Protected ranking
- SR = Special ranking
- SE = Special exempt
- JE = Junior exempt
- JR = Junior Accelerator Programme entrant
- CO = College Accelerator Programme entrant
- NG = Next Gen Accelerator Program entrant
- w/o = Walkover
- r = Retired
- d = Defaulted

=== Finals ===
Semifinals
(Argentina) Mariano Navone | 7 | 6
7 | (Tunisia) Malek Jaziri | 5 | 0
3 | (Argentina) Francisco Comesaña | 6 | 6
2 | (Brazil) Felipe Meligeni Alves | 3 | 2

Final
(Argentina) Mariano Navone | 4 | 0
3 | (Argentina) Francisco Comesaña | 6 | 6

=== Top half ===
First round
1 | (Argentina) JP Ficovich | 6^{5} | 6 | 7^{7}
(Bolivia) M Dellien | 7^{7} | 4 | 6^{2}
(Argentina) Facundo Juárez | 6 | 6
Q | (Argentina) Tomás Farjat | 0 | 4
(Argentina) M Navone | 6 | 3 | 6
WC | (Argentina) V Aboian | 4 | 6 | 3
Q | (Argentina) Fermín Tenti | 1 | 1
6 | (Dominican Republic) N Hardt | 6 | 6
4 | (Argentina) G Villanueva | 6 | 1 | 6
Q | (Argentina) Leonardo Aboian | 4 | 6 | 1
Q | (Argentina) G Andreozzi | 6 | 7
(United States) E Zhu | 1 | 5
(Brazil) Wilson Leite | 6^{2} | 3
Q | (Argentina) Juan Ignacio Galarza | 7^{7} | 6
(Argentina) RA Burruchaga | 4 | 6 | 5
7 | (Tunisia) M Jaziri | 6 | 0 | 7

Second round
1 | (Argentina) JP Ficovich | 6 | 6
(Argentina) F Juárez | 1 | 1
(Argentina) M Navone | 6 | 4 | 6
6 | (Dominican Republic) N Hardt | 1 | 6 | 0
4 | (Argentina) G Villanueva | 7^{7} | 6
Q | (Argentina) G Andreozzi | 6^{3} | 2
Q | (Argentina) JI Galarza | 6^{8} | 6^{6}
7 | (Tunisia) M Jaziri | 7^{10} | 7^{8}

Quarterfinals
1 | (Argentina) JP Ficovich | 6 | 0 | 3
(Argentina) M Navone | 3 | 6 | 6
4 | (Argentina) G Villanueva | 2 | 6 | 3
7 | (Tunisia) M Jaziri | 6 | 1 | 6

Semifinals
(Argentina) M Navone | 7 | 6
7 | (Tunisia) M Jaziri | 5 | 0

=== Bottom half ===
First round
8 | (Colombia) N Mejía | 0 | 1
(Peru) A Huertas del Pino | 6 | 6
(Peru) C Huertas del Pino | 6 | 3 | 7
(Spain) C Gómez-Herrera | 1 | 6 | 5
Q | (Japan) N Nakagawa | 4 | 2
WC | (Argentina) Juan Bautista Otegui | 6 | 6
(Peru) N Álvarez | 2 | 7^{7} | 3
3 | (Argentina) F Comesaña | 6 | 6^{4} | 6
5 | (Ecuador) R Quiroz | 6 | 6
Alt | (Argentina) Ignacio Monzón | 1 | 4
WC | (Argentina) A Barrena | 3 | 6 | 4
(Brazil) JL Reis da Silva | 6 | 1 | 6
(Argentina) MF Descotte | 6 | 6
(France) Matthieu Perchicot | 3 | 1
(Argentina) AL Lingua Lavallén | 2 | 6^{6}
2 | (Brazil) F Meligeni Alves | 6 | 7^{8}

Second round
(Peru) A Huertas del Pino | 6 | 1 | 6
(Peru) C Huertas del Pino | 4 | 6 | 4
WC | (Argentina) JB Otegui | 5 | 2
3 | (Argentina) F Comesaña | 7 | 6
5 | (Ecuador) R Quiroz | 6 | 1 | 2
(Brazil) JL Reis da Silva | 4 | 6 | 6
(Argentina) MF Descotte | 3 | 2
2 | (Brazil) F Meligeni Alves | 6 | 6

Quarterfinals
(Peru) A Huertas del Pino | 2 | 1
3 | (Argentina) F Comesaña | 6 | 6
(Brazil) JL Reis da Silva | 4 | 2
2 | (Brazil) F Meligeni Alves | 6 | 6

Semifinals
3 | (Argentina) F Comesaña | 6 | 6
2 | (Brazil) F Meligeni Alves | 3 | 2
