= 2026 Challenger AAT – Doubles =

Doubles
- 2026 Challenger AAT

Final
- Champions: (Argentina) Mariano Kestelboim (Brazil) Marcelo Zormann
- Runners-up: (Romania) Alexandru Jecan (Romania) Bogdan Pavel
- Score: 6–3, 6–4

Events
Singles	Doubles
- Challenger AAT

João Fonseca and Pedro Sakamoto were the defending champions but only Sakamoto chose to defend his title, partnering Matheus Pucinelli de Almeida. They withdrew from the tournament before their first round match.

Mariano Kestelboim and Marcelo Zormann won the title after defeating Alexandru Jecan and Bogdan Pavel 6–3, 6–4 in the final.

== Seeds ==
1. (Romania) Alexandru Jecan / (Romania) Bogdan Pavel (final)
2. (Argentina) Mariano Kestelboim / (Brazil) Marcelo Zormann (champions)
3. (Canada) Juan Carlos Aguilar / (Bolivia) Federico Zeballos (quarterfinals)
4. (Brazil) Bruno Oliveira / (Argentina) Gonzalo Villanueva (quarterfinals)

== Draw ==
Key

- Q = Qualifier
- WC = Wild card
- LL = Lucky loser
- Alt = Alternate
- ITF = ITF entry
- PR = Protected ranking
- SR = Special ranking
- SE = Special exempt
- JE = Junior exempt
- JR = Junior Accelerator Programme entrant
- CO = College Accelerator Programme entrant
- NG = Next Gen Accelerator Program entrant
- w/o = Walkover
- r = Retired
- d = Defaulted

First round
1	(Romania) A Jecan (Romania) B Pavel	7^{7}	6
(Venezuela) B Pérez (United States) N Schachter	6^{2}	4
WC	(Argentina) Juan Estévez (Argentina) Lucio Ratti	3	6	[10]
(Uruguay) J Aguilar Cardozo (Argentina) LE Ambrogi	6	3	[8]
3	(Canada) JC Aguilar (Bolivia) F Zeballos	6	7^{7}
(Bolivia) B Arias (Argentina) GI Justo	3	6^{3}
Alt	(Argentina) V Aboian (Argentina) Tomás Farjat	4	6	[7]
(Brazil) M Alves (Brazil) P Boscardin Dias	6	2	[10]
(Brazil) D Dutra da Silva (Peru) A Huertas del Pino	7^{7}	6
WC	(Argentina) Dante Pagani (Argentina) Máximo Zeitune	6^{5}	2
(Uruguay) I Carou (Argentina) N Kicker	7	6^{3}	[7]
4	(Brazil) Bruno Oliveira (Argentina) G Villanueva	5	7^{7}	[10]
(Italy) F Agamenone (Spain) N Sánchez Izquierdo	5	7^{7}	[5]
Alt	(Romania) GA Boitan (Romania) Sebastian Gima	7	6^{3}	[10]
Alt	(Argentina) Thiago Cigarrán (Argentina) Lorenzo Joaquín Rodríguez	0	2
2	(Argentina) M Kestelboim (Brazil) M Zormann	6	6

Quarterfinals
1	(Romania) A Jecan (Romania) B Pavel	6	6
WC	(Argentina) J Estévez (Argentina) L Ratti	4	2
3	(Canada) JC Aguilar (Bolivia) F Zeballos	3	6	[8]
(Brazil) M Alves (Brazil) P Boscardin Dias	6	4	[10]
(Brazil) D Dutra da Silva (Peru) A Huertas del Pino	7	4	[13]
4	(Brazil) B Oliveira (Argentina) G Villanueva	5	6	[11]
Alt	(Romania) GA Boitan (Romania) S Gima	3	2
2	(Argentina) M Kestelboim (Brazil) M Zormann	6	6

Semifinals
1	(Romania) A Jecan (Romania) B Pavel	6	7
(Brazil) M Alves (Brazil) P Boscardin Dias	4	5
(Brazil) D Dutra da Silva (Peru) A Huertas del Pino	7^{7}	6^{7}	[9]
2	(Argentina) M Kestelboim (Brazil) M Zormann	6^{1}	7^{9}	[11]

Final
1	(Romania) A Jecan (Romania) B Pavel	3	4
2	(Argentina) M Kestelboim (Brazil) M Zormann	6	6
