= 2022 Challenger Tenis Club Argentino =

- Date: 20–26 June
- Edition: 1st
- Surface: Clay
- Location: Buenos Aires, Argentina

Champions

Singles
- (Argentina) Francisco Comesaña

Doubles
- (Peru) Arklon Huertas del Pino / (Peru) Conner Huertas del Pino
- Challenger Tenis Club Argentino

The 2022 Dove Men+Care Legión Sudamericana Challenger Tenis Club Argentino was a professional tennis tournament played on clay courts. It was the first edition of the tournament which was part of the 2022 ATP Challenger Tour. It took place in Buenos Aires, Argentina between 20 and 26 June 2022.

== Singles main-draw entrants ==
=== Seeds ===
Country	Player	Rank^{1}	Seed
ARG	Juan Pablo Ficovich	175	1
BRA	Felipe Meligeni Alves	214	2
ARG	Francisco Comesaña	285	3
ARG	Gonzalo Villanueva	294	4
ECU	Roberto Quiroz	308	5
DOM	Nick Hardt	314	6
TUN	Malek Jaziri	329	7
COL	Nicolás Mejía	341	8

- ^{1} Rankings are as of 13 June 2022.

=== Other entrants ===
The following players received wildcards into the singles main draw:

- (Argentina) Valerio Aboian
- (Argentina) Alex Barrena
- (Argentina) Juan Bautista Otegui

The following player received entry into the singles main draw as an alternate:

- (Argentina) Ignacio Monzón

The following players received entry from the qualifying draw:

- (Argentina) Leonardo Aboian
- (Argentina) Guido Andreozzi
- (Argentina) Tomás Farjat
- (Argentina) Juan Ignacio Galarza
- (Japan) Naoki Nakagawa
- (Argentina) Fermín Tenti

== Champions ==
=== Singles ===
- (Argentina) Francisco Comesaña def. (Argentina) Mariano Navone 6–4, 6–0.

=== Doubles ===
- (Peru) Arklon Huertas del Pino / (Peru) Conner Huertas del Pino def. (Argentina) Matías Franco Descotte / (Argentina) Alejo Lorenzo Lingua Lavallén 7–5, 4–6, [11–9].
