= 2024 Challenger AAT II – Singles =

Singles
- 2024 Challenger AAT II

Final
- Champion: (Argentina) Facundo Bagnis
- Runner-up: (Argentina) Mariano Navone
- Score: 7–5, 1–6, 7–5

Events
Singles	Doubles
- Challenger AAT

Gonzalo Bueno was the defending champion but lost in the first round to Mariano Navone.

Facundo Bagnis won the title after defeating Navone 7–5, 1–6, 7–5 in the final.

== Seeds ==
1. (Argentina) Mariano Navone (final)
2. (Argentina) Genaro Alberto Olivieri (first round)
3. (Argentina) Santiago Rodríguez Taverna (quarterfinals)
4. (Argentina) Andrea Collarini (quarterfinals)
5. (Slovakia) Jozef Kovalík (second round, retired)
6. (Austria) Lukas Neumayer (first round)
7. (Italy) Edoardo Lavagno (semifinals)
8. (Argentina) Facundo Bagnis (champion)

== Draw ==
Key

- Q = Qualifier
- WC = Wild card
- LL = Lucky loser
- Alt = Alternate
- ITF = ITF entry
- PR = Protected ranking
- SR = Special ranking
- SE = Special exempt
- JE = Junior exempt
- JR = Junior Accelerator Programme entrant
- CO = College Accelerator Programme entrant
- NG = Next Gen Accelerator Program entrant
- w/o = Walkover
- r = Retired
- d = Defaulted

=== Finals ===
Semifinals
1/WC	(Argentina) Mariano Navone	6	6
7	(Italy) Edoardo Lavagno	0	4
SE	(Kazakhstan) Dmitry Popko	4	5
8	(Argentina) Facundo Bagnis	6	7

Final
1/WC	(Argentina) Mariano Navone	5	6	5
8	(Argentina) Facundo Bagnis	7	1	7

=== Top half ===
First round
1/WC	(Argentina) M Navone	6	6
SE	(Peru) G Bueno	3	2
Q	(Argentina) G Villanueva	6^{5}	4
Q	(Switzerland) D Wenger	7^{7}	6
Alt	(Italy) G Mager	5	2
WC	(Argentina) N Kicker	7	6
(Bolivia) M Dellien	1	7	6
6	(Austria) L Neumayer	6	5	3
3	(Argentina) S Rodríguez Taverna	6^{5}	6	6
(Brazil) G Heide	7^{7}	4	4
Q	(United Kingdom) F Gill	6	6
(Ecuador) Á Guillén Meza	2	2
(Ukraine) O Krutykh	3	3
(Italy) Alexander Weis	6	6
(Brazil) J Fonseca	5	4
7	(Italy) Edoardo Lavagno	7	6

Second round
1/WC	(Argentina) M Navone	6	6
Q	(Switzerland) D Wenger	3	3
WC	(Argentina) N Kicker	2	3
(Bolivia) M Dellien	6	6
3	(Argentina) S Rodríguez Taverna	3	6	6
Q	(United Kingdom) F Gill	6	4	4
(Italy) A Weis	4	7	5
7	(Italy) E Lavagno	6	5	7

Quarterfinals
1/WC	(Argentina) M Navone	6	6
(Bolivia) M Dellien	2	1
3	(Argentina) S Rodríguez Taverna	6	3	2
7	(Italy) E Lavagno	4	6	6

Semifinals
1/WC	(Argentina) M Navone	6	6
7	(Italy) E Lavagno	0	4

=== Bottom half ===
First round
5	(Slovakia) J Kovalík	6	3	6
WC	(Argentina) JB Torres	2	6	2
SE	(Kazakhstan) D Popko	6	7^{9}
Q	(Spain) C Sánchez Jover	3	6^{7}
Q	(Brazil) O Luz	3	6	1
(Spain) N Sánchez Izquierdo	6	2	6
Q	(Argentina) H Casanova	0	4
4	(Argentina) A Collarini	6	6
8	(Argentina) F Bagnis	6	6
Alt	(Germany) Timo Stodder	2	3
(Argentina) JP Ficovich	4	3
(Argentina) R Olivo	6	6
(Canada) L Draxl	6^{5}	6	6
(Brazil) JL Reis da Silva	7^{7}	3	1
(United States) T Boyer	6	6
2	(Argentina) GA Olivieri	0	1

Second round
5	(Slovakia) J Kovalík	3	2^{r}
SE	(Kazakhstan) D Popko	6	5
(Spain) N Sánchez Izquierdo	6	2	3
4	(Argentina) A Collarini	3	6	6
8	(Argentina) F Bagnis	6^{4}	6	6
(Argentina) R Olivo	7^{7}	4	3
(Canada) L Draxl	6	6
(United States) T Boyer	4	4

Quarterfinals
SE	(Kazakhstan) D Popko	6	6
4	(Argentina) A Collarini	4	4
8	(Argentina) F Bagnis	6	6
(Canada) L Draxl	4	4

Semifinals
SE	(Kazakhstan) D Popko	4	5
8	(Argentina) F Bagnis	6	7
