= 2023 Challenger AAT =

- Date: 24–30 April
- Edition: 2nd
- Surface: Clay
- Location: Buenos Aires, Argentina

Champions

Singles
- (Brazil) Thiago Seyboth Wild

Doubles
- (Argentina) Francisco Comesaña / (Brazil) Thiago Seyboth Wild
- Challenger AAT

The 2023 Challenger AAT Legión Sudamericana was a professional tennis tournament played on clay courts. It was the second edition of the tournament which was part of the 2023 ATP Challenger Tour. It took place in Buenos Aires, Argentina between 24 and 30 April 2023.

== Singles main-draw entrants ==
=== Seeds ===
Country	Player	Rank^{1}	Seed
ARG	Andrea Collarini	181	1
~~ARG~~	~~Thiago Agustín Tirante~~	~~185~~	~~2~~
ITA	Luciano Darderi	188	3
ARG	Juan Pablo Ficovich	197	4
~~ARG~~	~~Genaro Alberto Olivieri~~	~~205~~	~~5~~
DOM	Nick Hardt	221	6
ARG	Mariano Navone	227	7
BRA	Thiago Seyboth Wild	231	8

- ^{1} Rankings are as of 17 April 2023.

=== Other entrants ===
The following players received wildcards into the singles main draw:

- (Argentina) Alex Barrena
- (Argentina) Alejo Lorenzo Lingua Lavallén
- (Argentina) Lautaro Midón

The following players received entry into the singles main draw as alternates:

- (Brazil) Pedro Boscardin Dias
- (Chile) Gonzalo Lama
- (Argentina) Juan Bautista Otegui

The following players received entry from the qualifying draw:

- (Argentina) Valerio Aboian
- (Argentina) Tomás Farjat
- (Brazil) Gustavo Heide
- (Peru) Conner Huertas del Pino
- (Argentina) Mariano Kestelboim
- (Argentina) Matías Zukas

The following players received entry as lucky losers:

- (Brazil) Wilson Leite
- (Brazil) José Pereira

== Champions ==
=== Singles ===
- (Brazil) Thiago Seyboth Wild def. (Italy) Luciano Darderi 6–3, 6–3.

=== Doubles ===
- (Argentina) Francisco Comesaña / (Brazil) Thiago Seyboth Wild def. (Argentina) Hernán Casanova / (Argentina) Santiago Rodríguez Taverna 6–3, 6–7^{(5–7)}, [10–6].
