= 2024 Challenger AAT =

- Date: 8–14 January
- Edition: 3rd
- Surface: Clay
- Location: Buenos Aires, Argentina

Champions

Singles
- (Peru) Gonzalo Bueno

Doubles
- (Peru) Arklon Huertas del Pino / (Peru) Conner Huertas del Pino
- Challenger AAT

The 2024 Challenger AAT de TCA I was a professional tennis tournament played on clay courts. It was the third edition of the tournament which was part of the 2024 ATP Challenger Tour. It took place in Buenos Aires, Argentina between 8 and 14 January 2024.

== Singles main-draw entrants ==
=== Seeds ===
Country	Player	Rank^{1}	Seed
AUT	Lukas Neumayer	236	1
ITA	Edoardo Lavagno	240	2
ARG	Juan Pablo Ficovich	254	3
USA	Tristan Boyer	268	4
ARG	Renzo Olivo	281	5
BOL	Murkel Dellien	284	6
ESP	Nikolás Sánchez Izquierdo	291	7
UKR	Oleksii Krutykh	295	8

- ^{1} Rankings are as of 1 January 2024.

=== Other entrants ===
The following players received wildcards into the singles main draw:

- (Argentina) Luciano Emanuel Ambrogi
- (Argentina) Alex Barrena
- (Argentina) Lautaro Midón

The following players received entry into the singles main draw as alternates:

- (United Kingdom) Felix Gill
- (Brazil) Orlando Luz
- (Spain) Carlos Taberner
- (Argentina) Juan Bautista Torres

The following players received entry from the qualifying draw:

- (Argentina) Valerio Aboian
- (Brazil) Mateus Alves
- (Peru) Gonzalo Bueno
- (Argentina) Matías Franco Descotte
- (Kazakhstan) Dmitry Popko
- (Argentina) Gonzalo Villanueva

== Champions ==
=== Singles ===
- (Peru) Gonzalo Bueno def. (Kazakhstan) Dmitry Popko 6–4, 2–6, 7–6^{(7–4)}.

=== Doubles ===
- (Peru) Arklon Huertas del Pino / (Peru) Conner Huertas del Pino def. (Netherlands) Max Houkes / (Austria) Lukas Neumayer 6–3, 3–6, [10–6].
