= 2024 Challenger AAT – Singles =

Singles
- 2024 Challenger AAT

Final
- Champion: (Peru) Gonzalo Bueno
- Runner-up: (Kazakhstan) Dmitry Popko
- Score: 6–4, 2–6, 7–6^{(7–4)}

Events
| Singles | Doubles |
- Challenger AAT

Thiago Seyboth Wild was the defending champion but chose not to defend his title.

Gonzalo Bueno won the title after defeating Dmitry Popko 6–4, 2–6, 7–6^{(7–4)} in the final. Bueno became only the third teenager from South America to win an ATP Challenger Tour title in the past decade after Juan Manuel Cerundolo (2021) and Thiago Seyboth Wild (2019).

== Seeds ==
1. (Austria) Lukas Neumayer (second round)
2. (Italy) Edoardo Lavagno (first round)
3. (Argentina) Juan Pablo Ficovich (first round)
4. (United States) Tristan Boyer (quarterfinals)
5. (Argentina) Renzo Olivo (second round)
6. (Bolivia) Murkel Dellien (second round)
7. (Spain) Nikolás Sánchez Izquierdo (first round)
8. (Ukraine) Oleksii Krutykh (second round)

== Draw ==
Key

- Q = Qualifier
- WC = Wild card
- LL = Lucky loser
- Alt = Alternate
- ITF = ITF entry
- PR = Protected ranking
- SR = Special ranking
- SE = Special exempt
- JE = Junior exempt
- JR = Junior Accelerator Programme entrant
- CO = College Accelerator Programme entrant
- NG = Next Gen Accelerator Program entrant
- w/o = Walkover
- r = Retired
- d = Defaulted

=== Finals ===
Semifinals
(Brazil) João Fonseca | 2 | 4
Q | (Kazakhstan) Dmitry Popko | 6 | 6
Q | (Peru) Gonzalo Bueno | 6 | 6
(Brazil) João Lucas Reis da Silva | 4 | 4

Final
Q | (Kazakhstan) Dmitry Popko | 4 | 6 | 6^{4}
Q | (Peru) Gonzalo Bueno | 6 | 2 | 7^{7}

=== Top half ===
First round
1 | (Austria) L Neumayer | 7^{8} | 6
(Spain) C Sánchez Jover | 6^{6} | 3
(Ecuador) Á Guillén Meza | 4 | 4
(Italy) G Mager | 6 | 6
Alt | (United Kingdom) F Gill | 6 | 1 | 2
(Brazil) J Fonseca | 2 | 6 | 6
(Canada) L Draxl | 6 | 2^{r}
6 | (Bolivia) M Dellien | 1 | 5
4 | (United States) T Boyer | 3 | 6 | 6
Alt | (Argentina) JB Torres | 6 | 2 | 1
(Argentina) H Casanova | 6 | 7^{7}
(Italy) Alexander Weis | 2 | 6^{1}
Q | (Kazakhstan) D Popko | 5 | 6 | 6
Alt | (Brazil) O Luz | 7 | 4 | 1
(Germany) Timo Stodder | 6 | 7^{7}
7 | (Spain) N Sánchez Izquierdo | 2 | 6^{5}

Second round
1 | (Austria) L Neumayer | 6 | 6^{7} | 4
(Italy) G Mager | 3 | 7^{9} | 6
(Brazil) J Fonseca | 7 | 6
6 | (Bolivia) M Dellien | 5 | 4
4 | (United States) T Boyer | 6 | 3 | 6
(Argentina) H Casanova | 3 | 6 | 3
Q | (Kazakhstan) D Popko | 7^{9} | 6
(Germany) T Stodder | 6^{7} | 4

Quarterfinals
(Italy) G Mager | 1 | 3
(Brazil) J Fonseca | 6 | 6
4 | (United States) T Boyer | 6^{6} | 3
Q | (Kazakhstan) D Popko | 7^{8} | 6

Semifinals
(Brazil) J Fonseca | 2 | 4
Q | (Kazakhstan) D Popko | 6 | 6

=== Bottom half ===
First round
5 | (Argentina) R Olivo | 6 | 6
WC | (Argentina) LE Ambrogi | 3 | 2
WC | (Argentina) A Barrena | 4 | 7 | 3
Q | (Peru) G Bueno | 6 | 5 | 6
WC | (Argentina) L Midón | 6^{6} | 1
(Netherlands) M Houkes | 7^{8} | 6
Q | (Argentina) MF Descotte | 6 | 3 | 6
3 | (Argentina) JP Ficovich | 4 | 6 | 1
8 | (Ukraine) O Krutykh | 4 | 7 | 7^{7}
Q | (Argentina) G Villanueva | 6 | 5 | 6^{2}
Q | (Brazil) M Alves | 6 | 6
Q | (Argentina) V Aboian | 1 | 2
(Brazil) P Sakamoto | 6 | 7^{7}
Alt | (Spain) C Taberner | 4 | 6^{0}
(Brazil) JL Reis da Silva | 4 | 6 | 7^{7}
2 | (Italy) Edoardo Lavagno | 6 | 3 | 6^{4}

Second round
5 | (Argentina) R Olivo | 5 | 2
Q | (Peru) G Bueno | 7 | 6
(Netherlands) M Houkes | 4 | 6 | 6
Q | (Argentina) MF Descotte | 6 | 3 | 3
8 | (Ukraine) O Krutykh | 6^{3} | 6 | 3
Q | (Brazil) M Alves | 7^{7} | 3 | 6
(Brazil) P Sakamoto | 5 | 0
(Brazil) JL Reis da Silva | 7 | 6

Quarterfinals
Q | (Peru) G Bueno | 6 | 6
(Netherlands) M Houkes | 1 | 4
Q | (Brazil) M Alves | 4 | 3
(Brazil) JL Reis da Silva | 6 | 6

Semifinals
Q | (Peru) G Bueno | 6 | 6
(Brazil) JL Reis da Silva | 4 | 4
