= Comesaña =

Comesaña is a Spanish surname of Galician origin. It is likely derived from the parish of the same name in Vigo, Pontevedra.

Notable people with the surname include:

- Francisco Comesaña (born 2000), Argentine tennis player
- Gloria Comesaña (1946–2024), Spanish philosopher
- Julio Comesaña (born 1948), Uruguayan football manager
- Katarina Comesaña (born 1992), American footballer
- Santi Comesaña (born 1996), Spanish footballer
- Kevin Vázquez Comesaña (born 1993), Spanish footballer
