= 2026 Challenger AAT – Singles =

Singles
- 2026 Challenger AAT

Final
- Champion: (Italy) Franco Agamenone
- Runner-up: (Argentina) Andrea Collarini
- Score: 3–6, 6–4, 6–2

Events
Singles	Doubles
- Challenger AAT

Facundo Bagnis was the defending champion but chose not to defend his title.

Franco Agamenone won the title after defeating Andrea Collarini 3–6, 6–4, 6–2 in the final.

== Seeds ==
1. (Argentina) Santiago Rodríguez Taverna (second round)
2. (Argentina) Lautaro Midón (quarterfinals)
3. (Argentina) Andrea Collarini (final)
4. (Bolivia) Murkel Dellien (semifinals)
5. (Peru) Juan Pablo Varillas (semifinals)
6. (Argentina) Nicolás Kicker (first round)
7. (Brazil) Pedro Boscardin Dias (quarterfinals)
8. (Brazil) Matheus Pucinelli de Almeida (second round)

== Draw ==
Key

- Q = Qualifier
- WC = Wild card
- LL = Lucky loser
- Alt = Alternate
- ITF = ITF entry
- PR = Protected ranking
- SR = Special ranking
- SE = Special exempt
- JE = Junior exempt
- JR = Junior Accelerator Programme entrant
- CO = College Accelerator Programme entrant
- NG = Next Gen Accelerator Program entrant
- w/o = Walkover
- r = Retired
- d = Defaulted

=== Finals ===
Semifinals
(Italy) Franco Agamenone	6	7
4	(Bolivia) Murkel Dellien	4	5
3	(Argentina) Andrea Collarini	1	6	6
5	(Peru) Juan Pablo Varillas	6	2	4

Final
(Italy) Franco Agamenone	3	6	6
3	(Argentina) Andrea Collarini	6	4	2

=== Top half ===
First round
1	(Argentina) S Rodríguez Taverna	5	7	1
(Romania) GA Boitan	7	5	0^{r}
(Argentina) JB Torres	3	6	4
(Argentina) JM La Serna	6	2	6
LL	(United States) B Kuzuhara	2	3
(Italy) F Agamenone	6	6
Alt	(Brazil) M Alves	6^{1}	5
8	(Brazil) M Pucinelli de Almeida	7^{7}	7
4	(Bolivia) M Dellien	6	2	6
Q	(Uruguay) J Aguilar Cardozo	3	6	4
WC	(Argentina) Alexis Gurmendi	6	2	2^{r}
WC	(Argentina) Máximo Zeitune	3	6	3
(Spain) N Sánchez Izquierdo	3	6	6
Alt	(Brazil) João Eduardo Schiessl	6	2	2
(Brazil) D Dutra da Silva	6	6
6	(Argentina) N Kicker	3	4

Second round
1	(Argentina) S Rodríguez Taverna	6^{3}	3
(Argentina) JM La Serna	7^{7}	6
(Italy) F Agamenone	6	6
8	(Brazil) M Pucinelli de Almeida	4	2
4	(Bolivia) M Dellien	6	3	6
WC	(Argentina) M Zeitune	0	6	1
(Spain) N Sánchez Izquierdo	6	3
(Brazil) D Dutra da Silva	2	1^{r}

Quarterfinals
(Argentina) JM La Serna	6^{5}	3
(Italy) F Agamenone	7^{7}	6
4	(Bolivia) M Dellien	6	5	6
(Spain) N Sánchez Izquierdo	3	7	3

Semifinals
(Italy) F Agamenone	6	7
4	(Bolivia) M Dellien	4	5

=== Bottom half ===
First round
7	(Brazil) P Boscardin Dias	7^{7}	7^{8}
Q	(Argentina) V Aboian	6^{4}	6^{6}
Q	(Argentina) Juan Estévez	7^{7}	6
(Argentina) GI Justo	6^{2}	2
WC	(Argentina) Dante Pagani	4	2
Q	(Argentina) Lucio Ratti	6	6
(Argentina) LE Ambrogi	4	1
3	(Argentina) A Collarini	6	6
5	(Peru) JP Varillas	6	6
(Argentina) G Villanueva	4	3
(Argentina) R Olivo	4	0^{r}
(Brazil) P Sakamoto	6	1
(Argentina) Lorenzo Joaquín Rodríguez	2	5
Q	(Romania) Ștefan Paloși	6	7
Q	(Brazil) Wilson Leite	2	6	2
2	(Argentina) L Midón	6	3	6

Second round
7	(Brazil) P Boscardin Dias	4	7^{7}	6
Q	(Argentina) J Estévez	6	6^{2}	4
Q	(Argentina) L Ratti	4	2
3	(Argentina) A Collarini	6	6
5	(Peru) JP Varillas	6	0
(Brazil) P Sakamoto	4	0^{r}
Q	(Romania) Ș Paloși	3	2
2	(Argentina) L Midón	6	6

Quarterfinals
7	(Brazil) P Boscardin Dias	4	2
3	(Argentina) A Collarini	6	6
5	(Peru) JP Varillas	6	4	6
2	(Argentina) L Midón	3	6	3

Semifinals
3	(Argentina) A Collarini	1	6	6
5	(Peru) JP Varillas	6	2	4
