= 2024 Challenger AAT II =

- Date: 15–21 January
- Edition: 4th
- Surface: Clay
- Location: Buenos Aires, Argentina

Champions

Singles
- (Argentina) Facundo Bagnis

Doubles
- (Brazil) João Fonseca / (Brazil) Pedro Sakamoto
- Challenger AAT

The 2024 Challenger AAT de TCA II was a professional tennis tournament played on clay courts. It was the fourth edition of the tournament which was part of the 2024 ATP Challenger Tour. It took place in Buenos Aires, Argentina between 15 and 21 January 2024.

== Singles main-draw entrants ==
=== Seeds ===
Country	Player	Rank^{1}	Seed
ARG	Mariano Navone	126	1
ARG	Genaro Alberto Olivieri	174	2
ARG	Santiago Rodríguez Taverna	207	3
ARG	Andrea Collarini	227	4
SVK	Jozef Kovalík	231	5
AUT	Lukas Neumayer	233	6
ITA	Edoardo Lavagno	236	7
ARG	Facundo Bagnis	240	8

- ^{1} Rankings are as of 8 January 2024.

=== Other entrants ===
The following players received wildcards into the singles main draw:

- (Argentina) Nicolás Kicker
- (Argentina) Mariano Navone
- (Argentina) Juan Bautista Torres

The following players received entry into the singles main draw as special exempts:

- (Peru) Gonzalo Bueno
- (Kazakhstan) Dmitry Popko

The following players received entry into the singles main draw as alternates:

- (Italy) Gianluca Mager
- (Germany) Timo Stodder

The following players received entry from the qualifying draw:

- (Argentina) Hernán Casanova
- (United Kingdom) Felix Gill
- (Brazil) Orlando Luz
- (Spain) Carlos Sánchez Jover
- (Argentina) Gonzalo Villanueva
- (Switzerland) Damien Wenger

== Champions ==
=== Singles ===
- (Argentina) Facundo Bagnis def. (Argentina) Mariano Navone 7–5, 1–6, 7–5.

=== Doubles ===
- (Brazil) João Fonseca / (Brazil) Pedro Sakamoto def. (Germany) Jakob Schnaitter / (Germany) Mark Wallner 6–2, 6–2.
