= 2026 Challenger AAT =

- Date: 12–17 January
- Edition: 5th
- Surface: Clay
- Location: Buenos Aires, Argentina

Champions

Singles
- (Italy) Franco Agamenone

Doubles
- (Argentina) Mariano Kestelboim / (Brazil) Marcelo Zormann
- Challenger AAT

The 2026 Challenger AAT de TCA was a professional tennis tournament played on clay courts. It was the fifth edition of the tournament which was part of the 2026 ATP Challenger Tour. It took place in Buenos Aires, Argentina between 12 and 17 January 2026.

== Singles main-draw entrants ==
=== Seeds ===
Country	Player	Rank^{1}	Seed
ARG	Santiago Rodríguez Taverna	224	1
ARG	Lautaro Midón	232	2
ARG	Andrea Collarini	242	3
BOL	Murkel Dellien	247	4
PER	Juan Pablo Varillas	253	5
ARG	Nicolás Kicker	257	6
BRA	Pedro Boscardin Dias	273	7
BRA	Matheus Pucinelli de Almeida	298	8

- ^{1} Rankings are as of 5 January 2026.

=== Other entrants ===
The following players received wildcards into the singles main draw:

- (Argentina) Alexis Gurmendi
- (Argentina) Dante Pagani
- (Argentina) Máximo Zeitune

The following players received entry into the singles main draw as alternates:

- (Brazil) Mateus Alves
- (Brazil) João Eduardo Schiessl

The following players received entry from the qualifying draw:

- (Argentina) Valerio Aboian
- (Uruguay) Joaquín Aguilar Cardozo
- (Argentina) Juan Estévez
- (Brazil) Wilson Leite
- (Romania) Ștefan Paloși
- (Argentina) Lucio Ratti

The following player received entry as a lucky loser:

- (United States) Bruno Kuzuhara

== Champions ==
=== Singles ===
- (Italy) Franco Agamenone def. (Argentina) Andrea Collarini 3–6, 6–4, 6–2.

=== Doubles ===
- (Argentina) Mariano Kestelboim / (Brazil) Marcelo Zormann def. (Romania) Alexandru Jecan / (Romania) Bogdan Pavel 6–3, 6–4.
