= Gloria Comesaña =

Spanish feminist philosopher (1946–2024)

- Born: Gloria Margarita Comesaña Santalices; 5 December 1946; Vigo, Spain
- Died: 18 March 2024 (aged 77); Maracaibo, Venezuela
- Education: University of Zulia; Paris I Panthéon-Sorbonne University
- Occupation: Feminist philosopher

Gloria Margarita Comesaña Santalices (5 December 1946 – 18 March 2024) was a Spanish feminist philosopher based in Venezuela. She was co-founder of the Maracaibo Feminist League and the Maracaibo Women's House, as well as co-founder of the Venezuelan University Network of Women's Studies (Reuevem) and in 1991, founding coordinator of the Free Women's Course at the University of Zulia.

== Biography ==
As a philosopher, Comesaña held a PhD in philosophy from the Paris I Panthéon-Sorbonne University, France. She specialized in women's studies, developed an extensive career both as a teacher and writer, and developed her own work, publishing numerous works on contemporary philosophy and feminist theory in national and international journals, as well as several books.

Her works include Mujer, Poder y Violencia, Filosofía, Feminismo y Cambio Social and La alteridad: estructura ontológica de las relaciones entre los sexos. She studied the currents of Sartrean existentialism, dialectical materialism, ecotheology and Hannah Arendt's work. Among the philosophers and thinkers she admired are Søren Kierkegaard, Martin Heidegger, Karl Jaspers, Gabriel Marcel and the theologian Rosemary Radford Ruether. In a philosophy magazine of the University of Zulia (LUZ), she denied that she had been a disciple of Simone de Beauvoir (one of the founders of feminist thought of the 20th century), an urban legend, although she attended a cycle of lectures by Beauvoir at the University of Paris I.

At LUZ, Comesaña taught in the doctoral programs in human sciences and architecture. She was a visiting professor at the Catholic University Cecilio Acosta and research advisor to the Faculty of Philosophy and Theology of said university.

Comesaña was co-founder of the Maracaibo Feminist League, along with Gladys Tinedo, Mary Pampolini, Fátima Borges, Beatriz Rincón, Consuelo Arconada, Alba Carosio, Trina Erebrie and Teresa Sosa, and of the Maracaibo Women's House. She was founder and coordinator of the Free Women's Course at the School of Philosophy of the University of Zulia and was co-founder of the Venezuelan University Network of Women's Studies (Reuevem). She was also producer of the radio program Todas a Una on university radio.

== Selected works ==
- Alineación y Libertad: la doctrina sartreana del otro
- Análisis de las figuras femeninas en el teatro sartrean
- Mujer, Poder y Violencia
- Filosofía, Feminismo y Cambio Social
- De métodos y filosofía feminista
- La alteridad: estructura ontológica de las relaciones entre los sexos
- El machismo, ideología nefasta
