= Mariano Navone =

Argentine tennis player (born 2001)

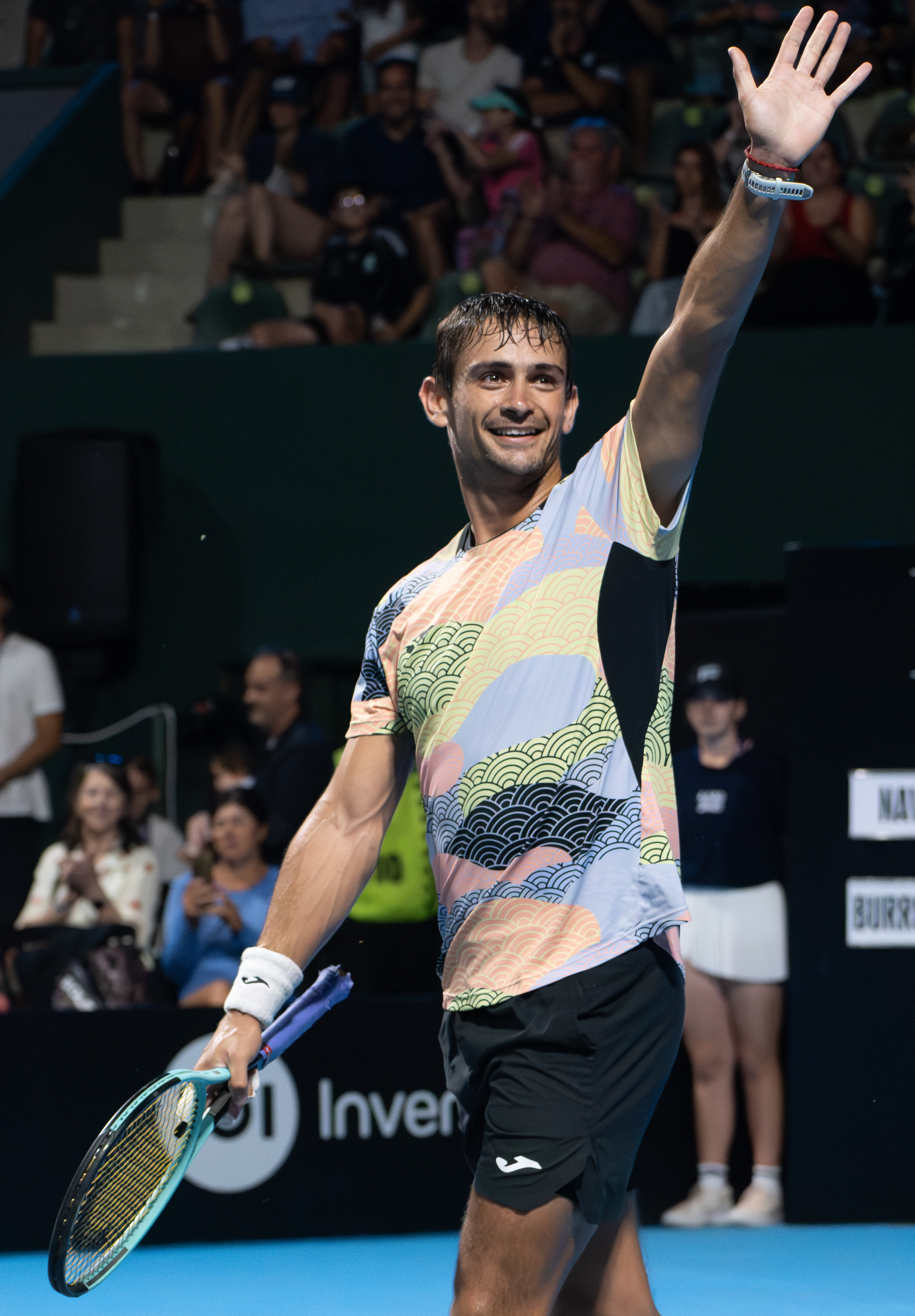
- Navone in 2025
- Country (sports): Argentina
- Born: 27 February 2001 (age 25) Nueve de Julio, Buenos Aires, Argentina
- Height: 1.78 m (5 ft 10 in)
- Plays: Right-handed (two-handed backhand)
- Coach: Andrés Dellatorre, Alberto Mancini, Dante Gennaro
- Prize money: US $4,025,092

Singles
- Career record: 57–67
- Career titles: 1
- Highest ranking: No. 29 (10 June 2024)
- Current ranking: No. 48 (9 November 2026)

Grand Slam singles results
- Australian Open: 1R (2025, 2026)
- French Open: 3R (2025)
- Wimbledon: 2R (2025)
- US Open: 3R (2026)

Other tournaments
- Olympic Games: 2R (2024)

Doubles
- Career record: 8–17
- Career titles: 0
- Highest ranking: No. 140 (16 June 2025)

Grand Slam doubles results
- Australian Open: 2R (2025)
- French Open: 1R (2024, 2026)
- Wimbledon: 1R (2024, 2026)
- US Open: 2R (2024)

Other doubles tournaments
- Olympic Games: 1R (2024)
- Last updated on: 31 August 2026.

Mariano Navone (born 27 February 2001) is an Argentine professional tennis player. He has a career-high ATP singles ranking of world No. 29 achieved on 10 June 2024 and a doubles ranking of No. 140, reached on 16 June 2025. He is currently the No. 3 singles player from Argentina.

Navone has won one ATP Tour singles title at the 2026 Țiriac Open.

== Early life and background ==
Navone was born in Nueve de Julio, Buenos Aires, to Luis Navone and Analía Vizzón. He is of Italian descent. He has two sisters, Lucía and Pilar. He began playing tennis at the age of three, and attended the Escuela de Tenis del Club Atletico Nueve de Julio.

== Professional career ==
=== 2023: Five Challenger titles, top 125 ===
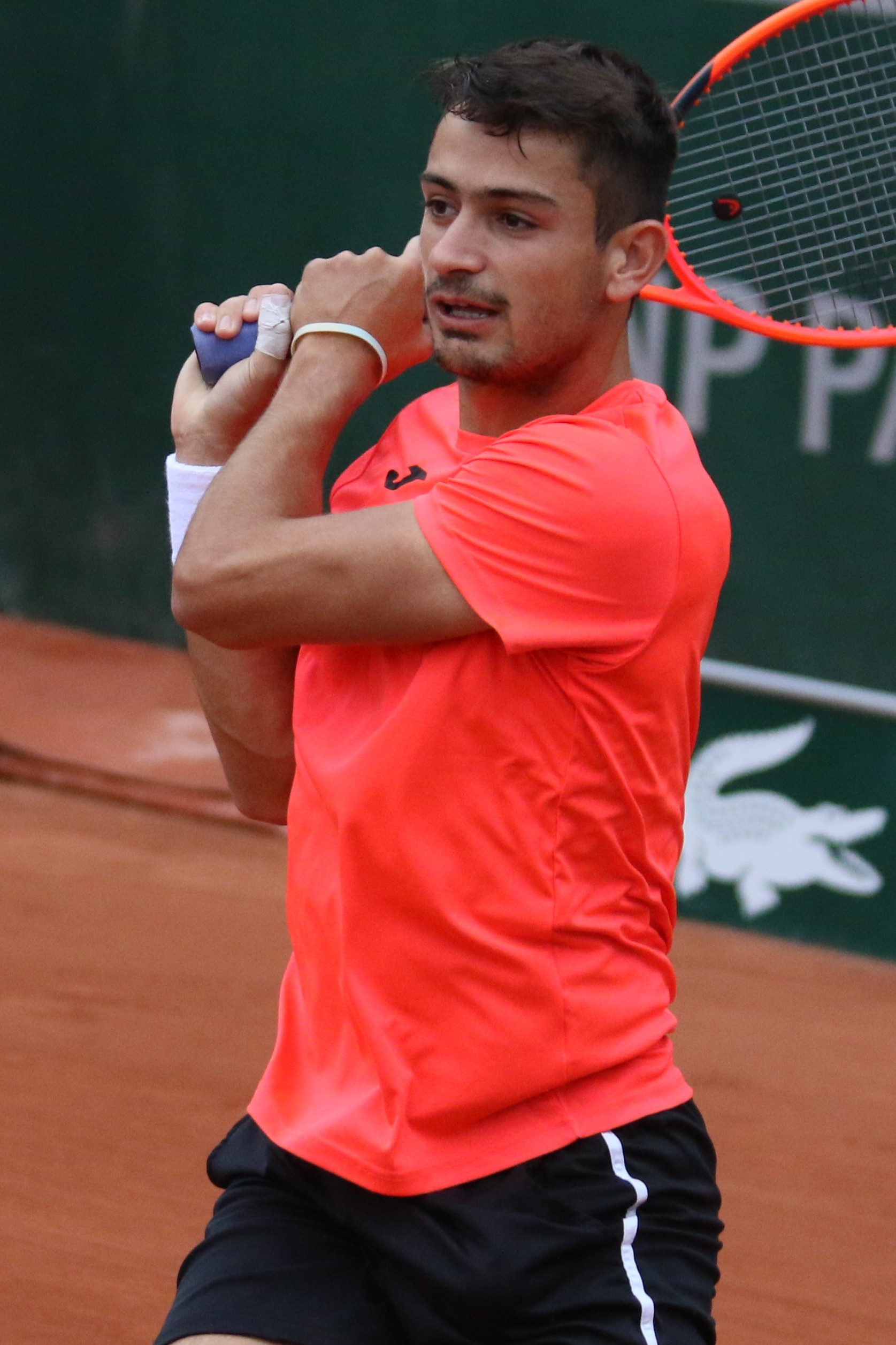
Navone at the 2023 French Open

Navone won five ATP Challenger singles titles, all during the 2023 season.

=== 2024: ATP, Major, Masters debuts & first wins, top 30 ===
He made his ATP Tour debut at the 2024 Córdoba Open as a wildcard. He also qualified for the next Latin American Golden swing tournament on home soil at the 2024 Argentina Open. Ranked No. 113, he qualified for his first ATP 500 tournament at the 2024 Rio Open and defeated compatriot Federico Coria for his first ATP win. He reached his first ATP semifinal defeating Yannick Hanfmann and wildcard João Fonseca. He reached his first final defeating defending champion and second seed Cameron Norrie, his first top-50 win. As a result, he reached the top 60, raising 50 positions up in the rankings. Navone became the first qualifier to reach an ATP 500 final since Jiří Veselý in Dubai in 2022. He lost to fifth seed Sebastián Báez in an all-Argentine final. He entered the next Golden swing tournament, the 2024 Chile Open with a special exempt (SE) status.

Seeded seventh at the 2024 Grand Prix Hassan II he reached the semifinals defeating wildcard Aziz Dougaz, Stan Wawrinka and Aleksandar Vukic before losing to eventual champion Matteo Berrettini. As a result, he reached a new career-high singles ranking of No. 51 on 8 April 2024. By reaching the second round at the 2024 Țiriac Open in Bucharest, with a win over Luciano Darderi as the fifth seed, he moved into the top 50 in the rankings. Next he defeated Thiago Seyboth Wild, top seed Francisco Cerúndolo and qualifier Grégoire Barrère to reach his second ATP career final. At the 2024 Mutua Madrid Open on his Masters debut, he reached the second round defeating Alexei Popyrin. He won the biggest title of his career thus far, at the 2024 Sardegna Open Challenger in Cagliari, Italy and moved into the top 35 in the rankings on 6 May 2024.

Navone entered the 2024 French Open seeded 31st, making history as the first player to make their first Grand Slam main draw as a seeded player.

=== 2025: French Open third round ===
At the Challenger 125 2025 Brawo Open Navone defeated compatriot and good friend Juan Manuel Cerúndolo lifting his first Challenger title since 2023.

=== 2026: First ATP title, back to top 50 ===
At the 2026 Țiriac Open, Navone defeated Daniel Mérida in the final to win his maiden ATP Tour title. He saved two match points en route, in the semifinals against Botic van de Zandschulp.

== Performance Timelines ==
Key
W	F	SF	QF	#R	RR	Q#	P#	DNQ	A	Z#	PO	G	S	B	NMS	NTI	P	NH

(W) winner; (F) finalist; (SF) semifinalist; (QF) quarterfinalist; (#R) rounds 4, 3, 2, 1; (RR) round-robin stage; (Q#) qualification round; (P#) preliminary round; (DNQ) did not qualify; (A) absent; (Z#) Davis/Fed Cup Zonal Group (with number indication) or (PO) play-off; (G) gold, (S) silver or (B) bronze Olympic/Paralympic medal; (NMS) not a Masters tournament; (NTI) not a Tier I tournament; (P) postponed; (NH) not held; (SR) strike rate (events won / competed); (W–L) win–loss record.
To avoid confusion and double counting, these charts are updated at the conclusion of a tournament or when the player's participation has ended.

=== Singles ===
Tournament	2023	2024	2025	2026	SR	W–L	Win %
Grand Slam tournaments
Australian Open	A	Q1	1R	1R	0 / 2	0–2	0%
French Open	Q1	2R	3R	2R	0 / 3	4–3	57%
Wimbledon	Q1	1R	2R	1R	0 / 3	1–3	25%
US Open	Q1	2R	1R	3R	0 / 2	3–3	50%
Win–loss	0–2	4–3	1–3	3–3	0 / 11	8–11	42%
National representation
Summer Olympics	NH	2R	NH		0 / 1	1–1	50%
Davis Cup	A	A	QF		0 / 1	1–1	50%
ATP 1000 tournaments
Indian Wells Open	A	A	2R	1R	0 / 2	1–2	33%
Miami Open	A	A	1R	2R	0 / 2	1–2	33%
Monte-Carlo Masters	A	A	1R	A	0 / 1	0–1	0%
Madrid Open	A	2R	2R	2R	0 / 3	3–3	50%
Italian Open	A	2R	2R	3R	0 / 3	3–3	50%
Canadian Open	A	1R	A	3R	0 / 2	2–2	50%
Cincinnati Open	A	1R	1R	2R	0 / 3	1–3	25%
Shanghai Masters	A	1R	1R	1R	0 / 3	0–3	0%
Paris Masters	A	1R	A	1R	0 / 2	0–2	0%
Win–loss	0–0	1–6	3–7	7–8	0 / 21	11–21	34%
Career statistics
	2023	2024	2025	2026	Total		
Tournaments	0	24	22	21	Career total: 67		
Titles	0	0	0	1	Career total: 1		
Finals	0	2	0	2	Career total: 4		
Hard win–loss	0–0	3–10	5–11	4–8	0 / 28	12–29	29%
Clay win–loss	0–0	15–11	12–11	17–10	1 / 33	44–32	58%
Grass win–loss	0–0	0–3	1–1	0–2	0 / 6	1–6	14%
Overall win–loss	0–0	18–24	18–23	21–20	57–67		
Win %	–	43%	44%	51%	46%		
Year-end ranking	125	47	72		$3,322,974		

== ATP Tour finals ==
=== Singles: 4 (1 title, 3 runner-ups) ===
Legend Grand Slam (–) ATP 1000 (–) ATP 500 (0–1) ATP 250 (1–2)	Finals by surface Hard (–) Clay (1–3) Grass (–)	Finals by setting Outdoor (1–3) Indoor (–)

Result	W–L	Date	Tournament	Tier	Surface	Opponent	Score
Loss	0–1	Feb 2024	Rio Open, Brazil	ATP 500	Clay	(Argentina) Sebastián Báez	2–6, 1–6
Loss	0–2	Apr 2024	Țiriac Open, Romania	ATP 250	Clay	(Hungary) Márton Fucsovics	4–6, 5–7
Win	1–2	Apr 2026	Țiriac Open, Romania	ATP 250	Clay	(Spain) Daniel Mérida	6–2, 4–6, 7–5
Loss	1–3	May 2026	Geneva Open, Switzerland	ATP 250	Clay	(United States) Learner Tien	6–3, 3–6, 5–7

== ATP Challenger Tour finals ==
Challenger

=== Singles: 14 (9 titles, 5 runner-ups) ===
Finals by surface
Hard (1–0)
Clay (8–5)

Result	W–L	Date	Tournament	Surface	Opponent	Score
Loss	0–1	Jun 2022	Corrientes Challenger, Argentina	Clay	(Argentina) Francisco Comesaña	0–6, 3–6
Loss	0–2	Jun 2022	Challenger Club Argentino, Argentina	Clay	(Argentina) Francisco Comesaña	4–6, 0–6
Loss	0–3	Sep 2022	Challenger de Villa María, Argentina	Clay	(Argentina) Nicolás Kicker	5–7, 3–6
Win	1–3	Jun 2023	Poznań Open, Poland	Clay	(Chile) Tomás Barrios Vera	7–5, 6–3
Win	2–3	Jul 2023	Challenger Santa Fe, Argentina	Clay	(Paraguay) Daniel Vallejo	6–2, 6–4
Win	3–3	Sep 2023	Santa Cruz Challenger, Bolivia	Clay	(Argentina) Francisco Comesaña	4–6, 7–5, 6–1
Win	4–3	Oct 2023	Buenos Aires Challenger, Argentina	Clay	(Argentina) Federico Coria	2–6, 6–3, 6–4
Win	5–3	Oct 2023	Challenger Santa Fe II, Argentina	Clay	(Italy) Andrea Pellegrino	3–6, 6–2, 6–3
Loss	5–4	Nov 2023	Lima Challenger II, Peru	Clay	(Italy) Luciano Darderi	6–4, 3–6, 5–7
Loss	5–5	Jan 2024	Challenger AAT II, Argentina	Clay	(Argentina) Facundo Bagnis	5–7, 6–1, 5–7
Win	6–5	May 2024	Sardegna Open, Italy	Clay	(Italy) Lorenzo Musetti	7–5, 6–1
Win	7–5	Jul 2025	Brawo Open, Germany	Clay	(Argentina) Juan Manuel Cerúndolo	6–3, 7–5
Win	8–5	Oct 2025	Los Inkas Open, Peru	Clay	(Italy) Marco Cecchinato	6–4, 5–7, 6–4
Win	9–5	Mar 2026	Copa Cap Cana, Dominican Republic	Hard	(Italy) Mattia Bellucci	7–5, 6–4

== ITF Tour finals ==
Futures/World Tennis

=== Singles: 2 (2 runner-ups) ===
Result	W–L	Date	Tournament	Surface	Opponent	Score
Loss	0–1	Sep 2021	M15 Ulcinj, Montenegro	Clay	(Chile) Bastián Malla	2–6, 2–6
Loss	0–2	Jul 2022	M25 Dénia, Spain	Clay	(Dominican Republic) Nick Hardt	6–3, 3–6, 2–6

=== Doubles: 5 (3 titles, 2 runner-ups) ===
Finals by surface
Hard (–)
Clay (3–2)

Result	W–L	Date	Tournament	Surface	Partner	Opponents	Score
Loss	0–1	Jun 2021	M15 Antalya, Turkey	Clay	(Chile) Miguel Fernando Perera	(Germany) Timo Stodder (United States) Toby Kodat	4–6, 4–6
Loss	0–2	Aug 2021	M15 Bratislava, Slovakia	Clay	(Italy) Francesco Vilardo	(Sweden) Simon Freund (United States) Vasil Kirkov	1–6, 0–6
Win	1–2	Sep 2021	M15 Žilina, Slovakia	Clay	(Italy) Francesco Vilardo	(Czech Republic) Jan Jermář (Czech Republic) Štěpán Pecák	4–6, 6–1, [10–7]
Win	2–2	Sep 2021	M15 Ulcinj, Montenegro	Clay	(Argentina) Alejo Lingua Lavallén	(Russia) Daniel Ibragimov (Russia) Egor Agafonov	6–3, 6–2
Win	3–2	Aug 2022	M25 Agadir, Morocco	Clay	(Spain) Álvaro López San Martín	(Germany) Nico Hornitschek (Germany) Jimmy Yang	3–6, 6–4, [10–5]

== Exhibition matches ==
=== Singles ===
Result	Date	Tournament	Surface	Opponent	Score
Win	Dec 2025	Road to Australia, Buenos Aires, Argentina	Hard	(Argentina) Román Andrés Burruchaga	7–5, 4–6, [10–7]

== Wins against top-10 players ==
- Navone has a 2–6 (25%) record against players who were, at the time the match was played, ranked in the top 10.

Season	2024	2025	2026	Total
Wins	0	0	2	2

#	Player	Rk	Event	Surface	Rd	Score	Rk	Ref
2026
1.	(Canada) Félix Auger-Aliassime	5	Italian Open, Italy	Clay	2R	7–6^{(7–4)}, 7–6^{(7–5)}	44	
2.	(Serbia) Novak Djokovic	5	US Open, United States	Hard	1R	7–6^{(7–5)}, 5–7, 4–6, 6–2, 6–1	49	

- Key: (Rk) first use, opponent rank; (Rd) round; (Rk) 2nd use, player rank; (Ref) reference; (F) final; (SF) semifinal; (QF) quarterfinal; (#R) rounds 4, 3, 2, 1; (RR) round-robin stage; (Q#) qualifying rounds or stages (3), 2, 1.

*As of 31 August 2026
