= Matías Franco Descotte =

Argentine tennis player

- Country (sports): Argentina
- Residence: Buenos Aires, Argentina
- Born: 29 August 1994 (age 31) Buenos Aires, Argentina
- Height: 1.91 m (6 ft 3 in)
- Plays: Right-handed (two-handed backhand)
- Prize money: $157,262

Singles
- Career record: 0–0
- Career titles: 0; 1 Challenger, 5 Futures
- Highest ranking: No. 285 (12 August 2019)

Doubles
- Career record: 0–0
- Career titles: 0; 1 Challenger, 8 Futures
- Highest ranking: No. 252 (29 July 2019)

Matías Franco Descotte (born 29 August 1994) is an Argentine tennis player.

Descotte has a career high ATP singles ranking of No. 285 achieved on 12 August 2019 and a career high doubles ranking of No. 252 achieved on 29 July 2019.

Descotte has won 1 ATP Challenger singles title at the 2019 Morelos Open.

== Challenger and Futures finals ==
=== Singles: 17 (8–9) ===
Legend (singles) ATP Challenger Tour (1–0) ITF Futures Tour (7–9)	Titles by surface Hard (5–8) Clay (3–1) Grass (0–0) Carpet (0–0)

Result	W–L	Date	Tournament	Tier	Surface	Opponent	Score
Loss	0–1	Apr 2017	Israel F3, Tel Aviv	Futures	Hard	(Israel) Edan Leshem	4–6, 1–6
Loss	0–2	Oct 2017	Israel F14, Kiryat Gat	Futures	Hard	(Belgium) Christopher Heyman	3–6, 7–6^{(7–5)}, 2–6
Loss	0–3	May 2018	Israel F5, Akko	Futures	Hard	(United States) Peter Kobelt	3–6, 2–6
Loss	0–4	May 2018	Israel F6, Sajur	Futures	Hard	(United States) Peter Kobelt	2–6, 6–4, 3–6
Win	1–4	Jun 2018	Zimbabwe F2, Harare	Futures	Hard	(United Kingdom) Isaac Stoute	6–2, 7–5
Win	2–4	Sep 2018	Bolivia F2, Santa Cruz	Futures	Clay	(Bolivia) Federico Zeballos	6–3, 1–6, 6–4
Loss	2–5	Oct 2018	Israel F13, Ashkelon	Futures	Hard	(Israel) Ben Patael	4–6, 2–6
Win	3–5	Nov 2018	Mozambique F1, Maputo	Futures	Hard	(Zimbabwe) Benjamin Lock	7–6^{(8–6)}, 6–2
Win	4–5	Nov 2018	Mozambique F2, Maputo	Futures	Hard	(Zimbabwe) Benjamin Lock	6–2, 6–3
Win	5–5	Feb 2019	Morelos, Mexico	Challenger	Hard	(Ecuador) Gonzalo Escobar	6–1, 6–4
Loss	5–6	Oct 2020	M15 Monastir, Tunisia	World Tennis Tour	Hard	(Lithuania) Laurynas Grigelis	3–6, 4–6
Loss	5–7	Jul 2021	M15 Monastir, Tunisia	World Tennis Tour	Hard	(Argentina) Santiago Rodríguez Taverna	4–6, 6–3, 5–7
Win	6–7	Oct 2021	M15 Cancún, Mexico	World Tennis Tour	Hard	(United States) Victor Lilov	7–5, 6–4
Win	7–7	Oct 2022	M15 Villa Carlos Paz, Argentina	World Tennis Tour	Clay	(Argentina) Lucio Ratti	6–3, 6–4
Loss	7–8	Nov 2022	M15 Córdoba, Argentina	World Tennis Tour	Clay	(Chile) Gonzalo Lama	2–6, 6–3, 6–7^{(3–7)}
Win	8–8	Nov 2022	M15 Luján, Argentina	World Tennis Tour	Clay	(Argentina) Lorenzo Joaquín Rodríguez	6–4, 2–6, 6–3
Loss	8–9	Mar 2023	M15 Naples, USA	World Tennis Tour	Clay	(Argentina) Federico Agustín Gómez	4–6, 0–6

=== Doubles: 22 (9–13) ===
Legend (doubles) ATP Challenger Tour (1–3) ITF Futures Tour (8–11)	Titles by surface Hard (6–6) Clay (3–8) Grass (0–0) Carpet (0–0)

Result	W–L	Date	Tournament	Tier	Surface	Partner	Opponents	Score
Loss	0–1	May 2014	Israel F6, Akko	Futures	Hard	(Brazil) Gustavo Guerses	(Republic of Ireland) Sam Barry (United States) Evan Song	2–6, 0–6
Win	1–1	Sep 2014	Argentina F16, Santiago del Estero	Futures	Clay	(Argentina) Gonzalo Villanueva	(Argentina) Juan Manuel Matute (Argentina) Mauricio Pérez Mota	4–6, 6–4, [10–1]
Loss	1–2	May 2015	Algeria F1, Oran	Futures	Clay	(Argentina) Matías Castro	(Turkey) Halit Berke Mangaloğlu (Spain) David Pérez Sanz	7–5, 2–6, [4–10]
Loss	1–3	Oct 2016	Ecuador F1, Quito	Futures	Clay	(United States) Raleigh Smith	(Brazil) Rafael Matos (Brazil) João Menezes	1–6, 4–6
Win	2–3	Apr 2017	Israel F3, Tel Aviv	Futures	Hard	(Chile) Juan Carlos Sáez	(Hungary) Gábor Borsos (Hungary) Viktor Filipenkó	6–4, 6–4
Win	3–3	Apr 2017	Israel F4, Ramat Gan	Futures	Hard	(France) Hugo Voljacques	(Israel) Ram Kapach (Israel) Yasha Zemel	6–3, 6–4
Loss	3–4	May 2017	Israel F7, Herzlia	Futures	Hard	(Israel) Dekel Bar	(Switzerland) Antoine Bellier (France) Albano Olivetti	6–7^{(1–7)}, 4–6
Loss	3–5	Aug 2017	Finland F1, Kaarina	Futures	Clay	(Sweden) Milos Sekulic	(Russia) Vladimir Polyakov (Russia) Alexander Vasilenko	4–6, 5–7
Loss	3–6	Aug 2017	Finland F2, Hyvinkää	Futures	Clay	(Estonia) Vladimir Ivanov	(Sweden) Daniel Appelgren (Sweden) Linus Frost	4–6, 3–6
Loss	3–7	Oct 2017	Israel F14, Kiryat Gat	Futures	Hard	(France) Hugo Voljacques	(United Kingdom) Richard Gabb (United Kingdom) Luke Johnson	4–6, 6–7^{(2–7)}
Win	4–7	Nov 2017	Chile F1, Curicó	Futures	Clay	(Chile) Alejandro Tabilo	(Argentina) Mariano Kestelboim (Argentina) Matías Zukas	6–2, 6–3
Loss	4–8	May 2018	Israel F5, Akko	Futures	Hard	(United States) Michael Zhu	(Germany) Johannes Härteis (France) Clément Larrière	4–6, 7–6^{(7–5)}, [6–10]
Win	5–8	May 2018	Israel F6, Sajur	Futures	Hard	(United States) Connor Farren	(Israel) Ram Kapach (Israel) Ori Maior	6–4, 6–3
Loss	5–9	Jun 2018	USA F14, Buffalo	Futures	Clay	(Argentina) Eduardo Agustín Torre	(Colombia) Alejandro Gómez (Mexico) Lucas Gómez	3–6, 4–6
Loss	5–10	Aug 2018	Segovia, Spain	Challenger	Hard	(Portugal) João Monteiro	(Spain) Andrés Artuñedo Martínavarro (Spain) David Pérez Sanz	7–6^{(7–3)}, 3–6, [6–10]
Win	6–10	Oct 2018	Israel F12, Herzlia	Futures	Hard	(Switzerland) Luca Castelnuovo	(Israel) Alon Elia (Lithuania) Julius Tverijonas	1–6, 6–2, [10–7]
Win	7–10	Oct 2018	Israel F14, Meitar	Futures	Hard	(Italy) Francesco Ferrari	(Switzerland) Luca Castelnuovo (France) Baptiste Crepatte	7–5, 7–6^{(8–6)}
Win	8–10	Jun 2019	Little Rock, USA	Challenger	Hard	(Brazil) Orlando Luz	(Philippines) Treat Huey (United States) Max Schnur	7–5, 1–6, [12–10]
Win	9–10	Sep 2019	M15 Buenos Aires	World Tennis Tour	Clay	(Chile) Bastian Malla	(Argentina) Maximiliano Estevez (Bolivia) Federico Zeballos	3–6, 6–4, [10–7]
Loss	9–11	Sep 2020	M15 Monastir	World Tennis Tour	Hard	(Argentina) Thiago Agustin Tirante	(Greece) Aristotelis Thanos (Greece) Petros Tsitsipas	3–6, 4–6
Loss	9–12	Jan 2022	Buenos Aires, Argentina	Challenger	Clay	(Argentina) Facundo Díaz Acosta	(Peru) Conner Huertas del Pino (Germany) Mats Rosenkranz	5-6 ret.
Loss	9–13	Jun 2022	Buenos Aires, Argentina	Challenger	Clay	(Argentina) Alejo Lorenzo Lingua Lavallén	(Peru) Arklon Huertas del Pino (Peru) Conner Huertas del Pino	5-7, 6–4, [9-11]
Loss	9–14	Aug 2022	M25 Guayaquil, Ecuador	World Tennis Tour	Clay	(Argentina) Leonardo Aboian	(Ecuador) Andrés Andrade (United States) Tristan McCormick	6–7^{(9)}, 6–7^{(2)}
