= João Fonseca (tennis) =

Brazilian tennis player (born 2006)

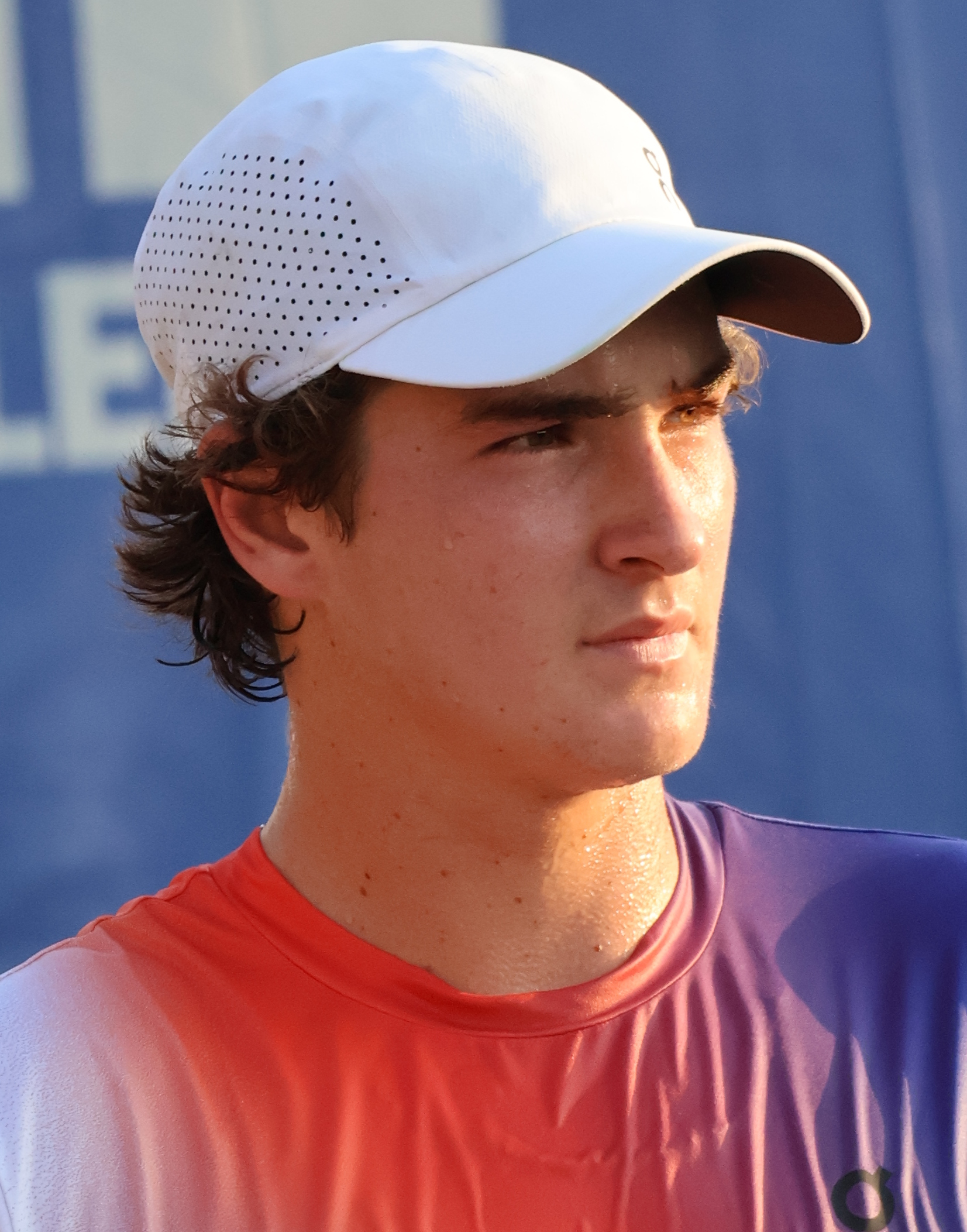
- Fonseca at the 2024 Cary Tennis Classic
- Full name: João Franca Guimarães Fonseca
- Country (sports): Brazil
- Residence: Rio de Janeiro, Brazil
- Born: 21 August 2006 (age 20) Rio de Janeiro, Brazil
- Height: 1.88 m (6 ft 2 in)
- Turned pro: 2024
- Plays: Right-handed (two-handed backhand)
- Coach: Franco Davín; Guilherme Teixeira
- Prize money: US $4,659,631

Singles
- Career record: 58–37 (at ATP Tour level, Grand Slam level, and in Davis Cup)
- Career titles: 2
- Highest ranking: No. 24 (3 November 2025)
- Current ranking: No. 46 (9 November 2026)

Grand Slam singles results
- Australian Open: 2R (2025)
- French Open: QF (2026)
- Wimbledon: 3R (2025, 2026)
- US Open: 2R (2025)

Doubles
- Career record: 7–6 (at ATP Tour level, Grand Slam level, and in Davis Cup)
- Career titles: 1
- Highest ranking: No. 102 (20 July 2026)
- Current ranking: No. 112 (16 November 2026)

Team competitions
- Davis Cup: 5–2
- Last updated on: 16 November 2026.

João Franca Guimarães Fonseca (Portuguese pronunciation: [ʒuˈɐ̃w fõˈsekɐ]; born 21 August 2006) is a Brazilian professional tennis player. He has a career-high ATP singles ranking of world No. 24 achieved on 3 November 2025 and a doubles ranking of No. 102, reached on 20 July 2026. He is the current No. 1 singles player from Brazil.

Fonseca has won two ATP Tour singles titles and one doubles title. He is also the 2024 NextGen Finals champion.

== Early life ==
Fonseca was born in Rio de Janeiro, Brazil, to parents Roberta and Christiano Fonseca. He started taking tennis lessons in his early childhood, at the Rio de Janeiro Country Club, a multi-sports club next to his home.

== Career ==
=== Juniors ===
Fonseca reached the final of the boys' doubles category at the 2023 Australian Open with Belgian Alexander Blockx. In March, he was a runner-up at Banana Bowl, a top junior-level event hosted in Criciúma, Brazil. Fonseca, as the fourth seed and home favourite, lost to second seed Yaroslav Demin in the final.

In July, Fonseca won the prestigious U18 grass tournament in Roehampton, England, prior to a run at the 2023 Wimbledon that saw him reach the quarterfinals in singles. He lost to eventual champion Henry Searle. He reached the semifinals in the doubles category, with Bolivian Juan Carlos Prado Ángelo.

Later that season, he won the boys' singles title at the 2023 US Open with a victory over American Learner Tien in the final. With that result, he became the third major junior champion in singles from Brazil, after Tiago Fernandes and Thiago Seyboth Wild.

Fonseca had good results on ITF Junior Circuit, maintaining a 92–27 singles win-loss record. At 17 years old, he was the first Brazilian to finish the season as world No. 1 in the junior rankings on 11 September 2023. He was named the 2023 junior champion by the ITF.

=== 2023: First professional matches, ATP Tour debut ===
Fonseca made his ATP debut at the 2023 Rio Open after receiving a wildcard for the singles main draw and also appeared in the doubles main draw, entering as lucky losers with Mateus Alves.

=== 2024: First ATP wins, NextGen Finals title ===
In January 2024, the 17-year-old Fonseca reached the semifinals of the Buenos Aires Challenger, his best performance in this type of tournament. Until then, Fonseca had reached the quarterfinals in two challengers, the first in 2022 in São Leopoldo and the most recent in 2023, in Florianópolis.

Ranked No. 655 that moment, Fonseca made a second appearance in the main draw at the 2024 Rio Open after receiving a wildcard in singles and also in doubles qualifying with Marcelo Zormann. He recorded his first ATP and first ATP 500 win over seventh seed Arthur Fils in straight sets, giving away only four games. Excluding the Davis Cup, he became the first South American to claim an opening set 6–0 against a top 50 ranked opponent before turning 18, since the ATP rankings were first published in 1973. He also became the first player born in 2006 to win an ATP Tour match. Next, he defeated Cristian Garin in straight sets to reach his first ATP quarterfinal. As a result, he moved 300 positions up, making him the youngest player in the top 350 in the rankings. He became the second youngest ATP 500 quarterfinalist since the series began in 2009 and the first since Alexander Zverev made the last eight in Hamburg in 2014.

Days after the end of his run in Rio, Fonseca was rewarded with a second consecutive ATP Tour tournament wildcard at the 2024 Chile Open. Later that week, he officially announced his decision to fully turn pro, forgoing his eligibility to play college tennis and ending his commitment to the University of Virginia.

In March, at the 2024 Paraguay Open, Fonseca defeated Argentine Román Burruchaga to reach his first ATP Challenger final and made his top 300 debut at world No. 288 on 1 April 2024 moving more than 50 positions up in the rankings. He lost to compatriot Gustavo Heide in the championship match.

Ranked No. 276, Fonseca received a wildcard for the 2024 Țiriac Open in Bucharest, Romania and reached the quarterfinals of an ATP Tour event for the second time, defeating sixth seed Lorenzo Sonego, his third ATP tour win, and fellow qualifier Radu Albot. He lost to fourth seed Alejandro Tabilo. As a result, he reached the top 250 in the rankings.

Fonseca received a wildcard for the main draw of the 2024 Madrid Open, making his debut at a Masters 1000 and defeated American Alex Michelsen, recording his first win at this level. Ranked No. 217, at the beginning of the grass season, he also received a wildcard for the main draw of the 2024 Halle Open. He reached the top 175 at world No. 166 on 5 August 2024, climbing close to 50 positions up, following lifting his maiden Challenger title at the 2024 Lexington Challenger, without losing a single set in the tournament. At 17 years old, he was the youngest Challenger champion of the 2024 season.

Fonseca qualified for the 2024 Next Generation ATP Finals on 29 November 2024. Although the lowest ranked player, he won the title.

=== 2025: Major debut & third round, ATP 500 title, Brazilian No. 1, top 25 ===
Fonseca lifted his second Challenger title at his very first tournament of the season, the 2025 Canberra Tennis International, defeating American Ethan Quinn in the final, recording his 10th consecutive win and reaching his new career high ranking at No. 113 on 6 January 2025.

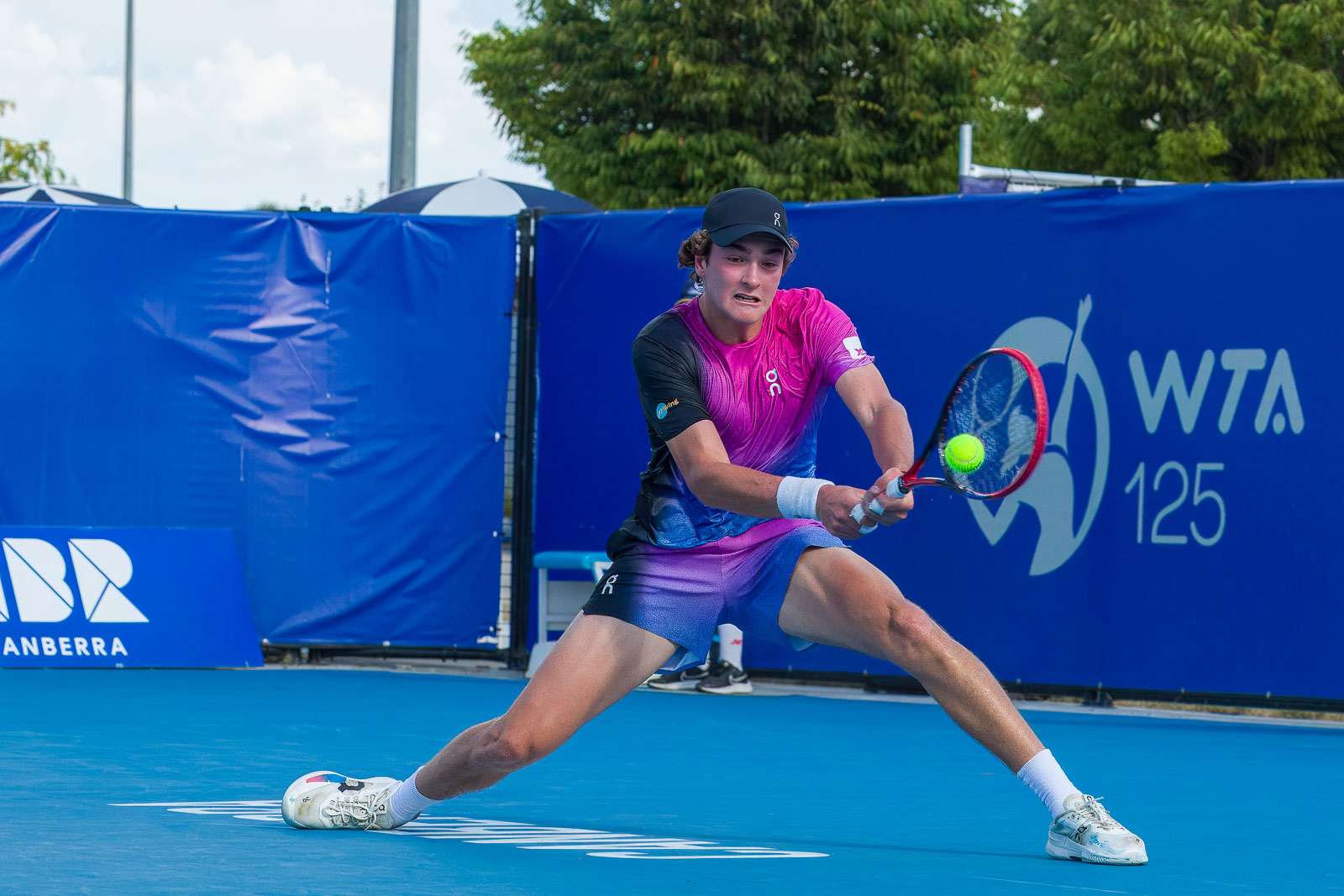
Fonseca playing at the 2025 Canberra Tennis International.

Fonseca qualified for the Australian Open to make his major debut. He defeated ninth seed Andrey Rublev in straight sets in his first major main draw match for his first top 10 victory, becoming the first teenager since Mario Ančić (against Roger Federer in 2002 Wimbledon Championships) to beat a top 10 player in the first round of a Grand Slam. Fonseca made his Top 100 debut on 27 January 2025, at No. 99. At 18 years 5 months and 6 days, he became the youngest Brazilian to ever do so, surpassing Cássio Motta.

Fonseca became the youngest Brazilian in the Open Era to reach an ATP semifinal, at the 2025 Argentina Open and the first man born in 2006 or later to reach a final. At 18 years 5 months and 26 days, Fonseca became also the tenth-youngest tour-level finalist since 2000, and the youngest South American finalist since former World No. 20 Argentine José Acasuso in 2001. With reaching the final he entered the top 75 in the rankings, becoming the Brazilian No. 1 singles player on 17 February 2025. He lifted his maiden tour-level title with a straight-sets win over Francisco Cerúndolo becoming the youngest Brazilian to win an ATP title in the Open Era. He was also the youngest South American champion and 10th-youngest titlist in ATP Tour era (since 1990).

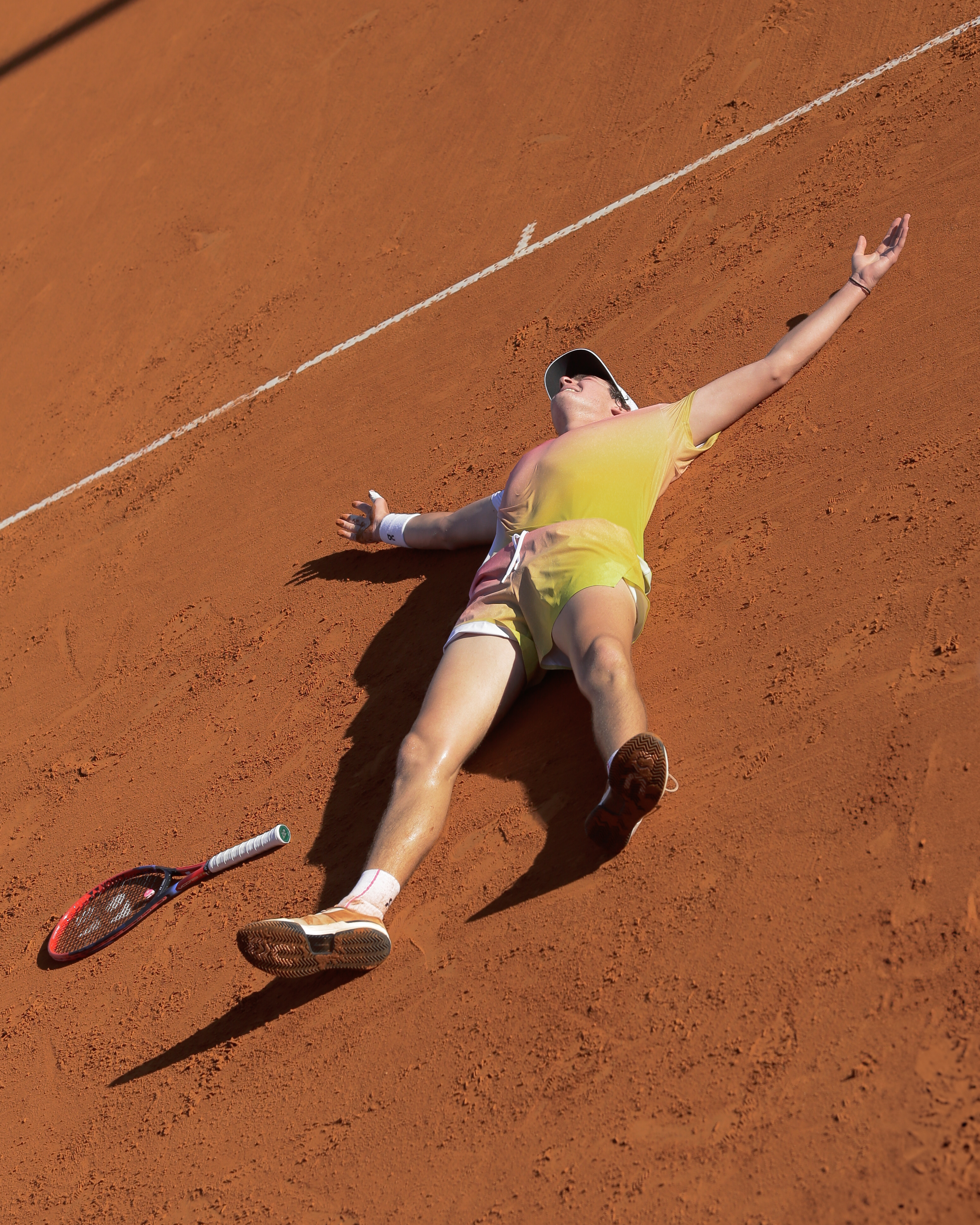
Fonseca celebrating his win in the 2025 Buenos Aires final

After that campaign, Fonseca came back to his hometown event at the 2025 Rio Open, where he played in the singles draw and lost to Alexandre Müller in the first round.

Fonseca received a wildcard to the Indian Wells Open, a prestigious Masters 1000-level event. The Brazilian won against Jacob Fearnley in three sets and lost in the second round to the 13th seed and eventual champion Jack Draper.

This early defeat led Fonseca to play the following week in the Arizona Tennis Classic in Phoenix, where he earned his second Challenger singles title – biggest of the series at 175 – for the season, with victories over fourth seed Jan-Lennard Struff, former Top-10 Kei Nishikori and Alexander Bublik in the final. It was also his fourth Challenger title overall. With this trophy, Fonseca became the first player to win ATP 250, Challenger 175 and Challenger 125 titles in the same season.

At the 2025 Wimbledon Championships, on his debut at the tournament, Fonseca became the first Brazilian man to reach the third round since Thomaz Bellucci in 2010, and the youngest man to reach the third round since Bernard Tomic in 2011. As a result, he reached the top 50 on 14 July 2025.

After reaching the third round of the Cincinnati Masters 1000, he reached No. 44 in the world, joining Flávio Saretta as one of the top 10 Brazilian men's tennis players in history. He also reached the second round of the US Open, where he was eliminated by No. 22 Tomáš Macháč, and rose to No. 42 in the rankings.

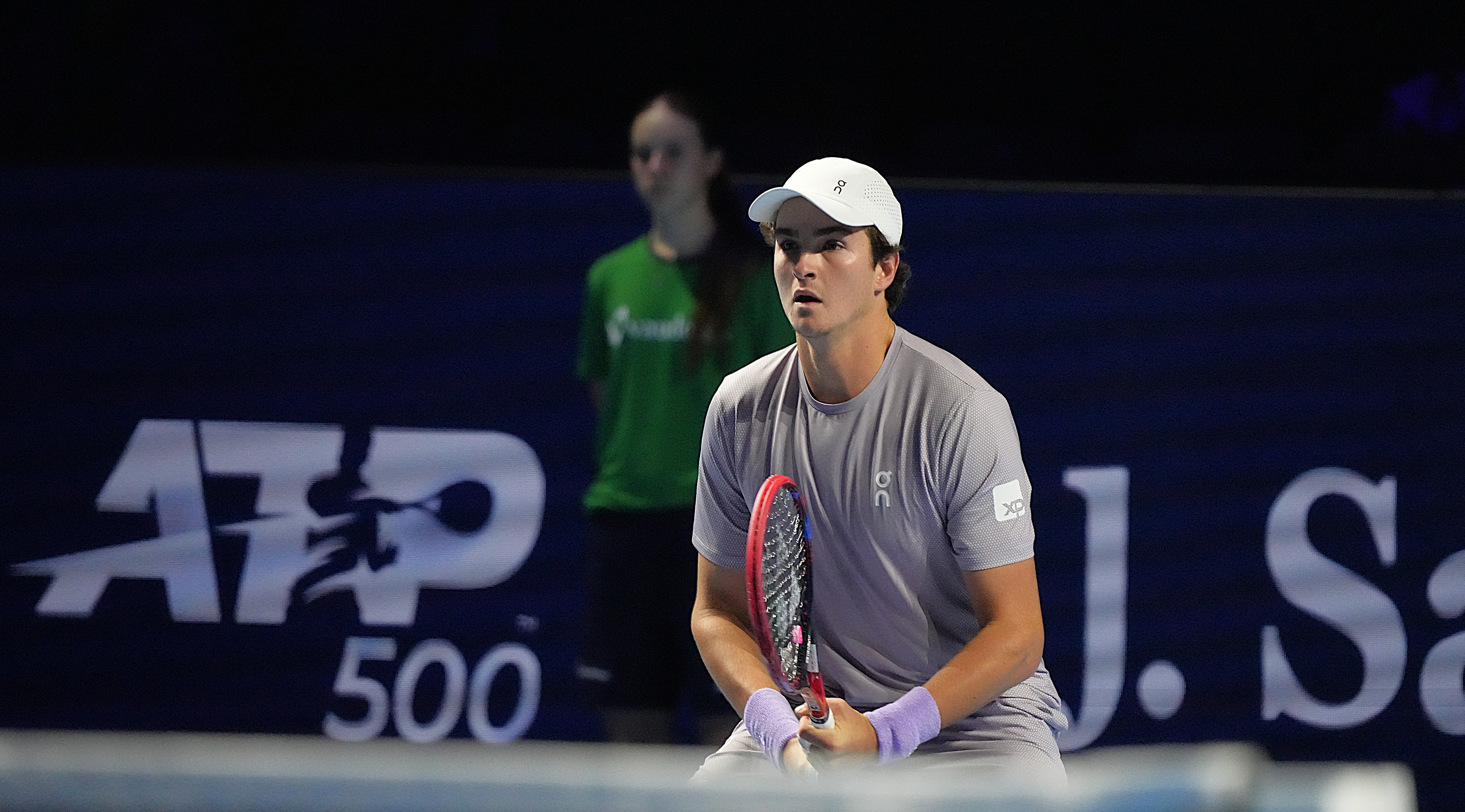
João Fonseca has won Swiss Indoors Basel 2025.

At the 2025 Swiss Indoors in Basel, he defeated defending champion Giovanni Mpetshi Perricard in the first round. After a walkover from Jakub Menšík, Fonseca then defeated world No. 23 and ninth seed Denis Shapovalov in the quarterfinals and world No. 42 Jaume Munar in the semifinals. Fonseca was crowned champion after his victory over No. 18 and eighth seed Alejandro Davidovich Fokina in the final. As a result of that title, Fonseca became the first Brazilian singles player to win an ATP 500 tournament since the tournament's designation was created in 2009 and also the second youngest player to lift a title at this level after Carlos Alcaraz. That new title boosted his singles ranking to a career-high of world No. 28 on 27 October 2025. It was the biggest title of Fonseca's career to date, and the most notable achievement in Brazilian tennis in men's singles since Kuerten's title at the 2001 Cincinnati Masters.

=== 2026: First ATP Tour doubles title, Masters 1000 quarterfinal, and major quarterfinal ===
In January 2026, Fonseca was scheduled to start the season by playing at the Brisbane International and face Reilly Opelka on the first round, but due to an injury on his back, he withdrew from that tournament. He would also play at the Adelaide International the following week, but still feeling that injury, he also decided not to play.

Later that month, he participated at the Australian Open as the 28th seed, but lost on the first round to Eliot Spizzirri in four sets.

Fonseca's next tournament of the season was at the Argentina Open in Buenos Aires, where he was the defending singles champion, but could not defend his title due to a loss on the first round to Alejandro Tabilo in three sets.

His next tournament was at the Rio Open, his hometown event, where Fonseca got his first win of the season by beating fellow countryman and qualifier Thiago Monteiro. He lost on the second round to Peruvian Ignacio Buse in three sets. Fonseca also received a wildcard to participate in the doubles event, partnering with compatriot Marcelo Melo. The Brazilian pair reached the final, facing German Constantin Frantzen and Dutch Robin Haase. That was the first time on Fonseca's career that he reached a doubles final on any ATP tournament. Fonseca and Melo ended up winning that final, securing his first ever doubles title on the ATP Tour. As a result, Fonseca also achieved his best doubles ranking at that moment, No. 160.

Fonseca arrived at the Indian Wells Open unseeded. Despite this disadvantage, he collected victories against 16th seed Karen Khachanov and 23rd seed Tommy Paul to reach the Round of 16, where he lost to world No. 2 Jannik Sinner in two tie-breaks.

In early April, Fonseca played in Monte Carlo, Monaco for the first time. At that tournament, he became the second player born in 2006 to reach the quarter-finals of a Masters, with victories over Gabriel Diallo, Arthur Rinderknech and Matteo Berrettini. He lost to third seed Alexander Zverev in three sets.

At the 2026 French Open, Fonseca became the first seeded Brazilian player to appear in the men’s singles draw since the 2011 edition, when Thomaz Bellucci was the last Brazilian man to achieve the feat. In the second round, he recovered from two sets down to defeat Dino Prižmić in a three-and-a-half-hour match, setting up a third-round encounter with 24-time major winner Novak Djokovic. Fonseca upset Djokovic in five sets for his second straight win down two sets to love, becoming the first Brazilian in history to win against Djokovic in singles. Djokovic's defeat was only the second time (after the 2010 French Open) that he lost at a major after leading two sets to love, and the first time since 2009 that Djokovic failed to reach the quarterfinals at the French Open. Fonseca became the first teenager to beat Djokovic at a major.

== Personal life ==
Fonseca's father is CEO and co-founder of IP Capital Partners, the first independent hedge fund in Brazil. His mother is a former volleyball player.

== Performance timeline ==
Key
W	F	SF	QF	#R	RR	Q#	P#	DNQ	A	Z#	PO	G	S	B	NMS	NTI	P	NH

(W) winner; (F) finalist; (SF) semifinalist; (QF) quarterfinalist; (#R) rounds 4, 3, 2, 1; (RR) round-robin stage; (Q#) qualification round; (P#) preliminary round; (DNQ) did not qualify; (A) absent; (Z#) Davis/Fed Cup Zonal Group (with number indication) or (PO) play-off; (G) gold, (S) silver or (B) bronze Olympic/Paralympic medal; (NMS) not a Masters tournament; (NTI) not a Tier I tournament; (P) postponed; (NH) not held; (SR) strike rate (events won / competed); (W–L) win–loss record.
To avoid confusion and double counting, these charts are updated at the conclusion of a tournament or when the player's participation has ended.

=== Singles ===
Current through the 2026 Cincinnati Open.

Tournament	2023	2024	2025	2026	SR	W–L	Win%
Grand Slam tournaments
Australian Open	A	A	2R	1R	0 / 2	1–2	33%
French Open	A	A	3R	QF	0 / 2	6–2	75%
Wimbledon	A	Q1	3R	3R	0 / 2	4–2	67%
US Open	A	Q3	2R	A	0 / 1	1–1	50%
Win–loss	0–0	0–0	6–4	6–3	0 / 7	12–7	63%
National representation
Davis Cup	A	RR	WG1	WG1	0 / 2	4–2	67%
ATP 1000 tournaments
Indian Wells Open	A	A	2R	4R	0 / 2	4–2	67%
Miami Open	A	A	3R	2R	0 / 2	3–2	60%
Monte-Carlo Masters	A	A	A	QF	0 / 1	3–1	75%
Madrid Open	A	2R	2R	3R (Note: Fonseca received a walkover in the second round of the 2026 Madrid Open against Marin Čilić, which does not officially count as a win.)	0 / 3	2–3	40%
Italian Open	A	A	1R	2R	0 / 2	0–2	0%
Canadian Open	A	A	1R	4R	0 / 2	2–2	50%
Cincinnati Open	A	A	3R	3R	0 / 2	3–1	75%
Shanghai Masters	A	A	A	A	0 / 0	0–0	–
Paris Masters	A	A	2R	A	0 / 1	1–1	50%
Win–loss	0–0	1–1	7–7	10–6	0 / 15	18–14	56%
Career statistics
	2023	2024	2025	2026	Career		
Tournaments	1	6	17	14	Career total: 38		
Titles	0	0	2	0	Career total: 2		
Finals	0	0	2	0	Career total: 2		
Overall win–loss	0–1	12–7	26–16	20–13	58–37		
Win %	0%	63%	62%	61%	61%		
Year-end ranking	730	145	24		$4,659,631		

== ATP Tour finals ==
=== Singles: 2 (2 titles) ===
Legend ATP 500 (1–0) ATP 250 (1–0)	Finals by surface Hard (1–0) Clay (1–0)	Finals by setting Outdoor (1–0) Indoor (1–0)

Result	W–L	Date	Tournament	Tier	Surface	Opponent	Score
Win	1–0	Feb 2025	Argentina Open, Argentina	ATP 250	Clay	(Argentina) Francisco Cerúndolo	6–4, 7–6^{(7–1)}
Win	2–0	Oct 2025	Swiss Indoors, Switzerland	ATP 500	Hard (i)	(Spain) Alejandro Davidovich Fokina	6–3, 6–4

=== Doubles: 2 (1 title, 1 runner-up) ===
Legend ATP 500 (1–1)	Finals by surface Clay (1–0) Grass (0–1)	Finals by setting Outdoor (1–1)

Result	W–L	Date	Tournament	Tier	Surface	Partner	Opponents	Score
Win	1–0	Feb 2026	Rio Open, Brazil	ATP 500	Clay	(Brazil) Marcelo Melo	(Germany) Constantin Frantzen (Netherlands) Robin Haase	4–6, 6–3, [10–8]
Loss	1–1	Jun 2026	Halle Open, Germany	ATP 500	Grass	(Germany) Daniel Altmaier	(France) Théo Arribagé (France) Albano Olivetti	6–7^{(2–7)}, 4–6

== Next Gen ATP finals ==
=== Singles: 1 (title) ===
Result	Date	Tournament	Surface	Opponent	Score
Win	Dec 2024	Next Gen ATP Finals, Saudi Arabia	Hard (i)	(United States) Learner Tien	2–4, 4–3^{(10–8)}, 4–0, 4–2

== ATP Challenger finals ==
=== Singles: 4 (3 titles, 1 runner-up) ===
Legend ATP Challenger (3–1)	Finals by surface Hard (3–0) Clay (0–1)

Result	W–L	Date	Tournament	Surface	Opponent	Score
Loss	0–1	Mar 2024	Paraguay Open, Paraguay	Clay	(Brazil) Gustavo Heide	5–7, 7–6^{(8–6)}, 1–6
Win	1–1	Jul 2024	Lexington Challenger, US	Hard	(Australia) Li Tu	6–1, 6–4
Win	2–1	Jan 2025	Canberra Tennis International, Australia	Hard	(United States) Ethan Quinn	6–4, 6–4
Win	3–1	Mar 2025	Arizona Tennis Classic, US	Hard	(Kazakhstan) Alexander Bublik	7–6^{(7–5)}, 7–6^{(7–0)}

=== Doubles: 1 (title) ===
Legend ATP Challenger (1–0)

Result	W–L	Date	Tournament	Surface	Partner	Opponents	Score
Win	1–0	Jan 2024	Challenger ATT II, Argentina	Clay	(Brazil) Pedro Sakamoto	(Germany) Jakob Schnaitter (Germany) Mark Wallner	6–2, 6–2

== ITF World Tennis Tour finals ==
=== Doubles: 1 (runner-up) ===
Legend ITF World Tennis (0–1)

Result	W–L	Date	Tournament	Surface	Partner	Opponents	Score
Loss	0–1	Jun 2023	M15 Saarlouis, Germany	Clay	(Switzerland) Dylan Dietrich	(Switzerland) Luca Staeheli (France) Robin Catry	1–6, 2–6

== National and international representation ==
=== Laver Cup ===
==== Laver Cup matches: 1 (1 victory) ====
Matches by type Singles (1–0) Doubles (–)	Matches by points scoring Day 1, 1 point (1–0) Day 2, 2 points (–) Day 3, 3 points (–)	Matches by venue Europe (–) Rest of the World (1–0)

- ▲ ▼ indicates the result of the Laver Cup match followed by the score, date, place of event and the court surface.

No.	Day (points)	Match type (partner if any)	Opponent team	Opponent player(s)	Result	Score
6–9; 19–21 September 2025; Chase Center, San Francisco, United States; hard indoor surface
1	Day 1 (1 point)	Singles	Team Europe	(Italy) Flavio Cobolli	Win	6–4, 6–3

==== Results: 1 (title) ====
Result	Date	Location	Surface	Team	Captains	Partners	Opponent team	Opp. captains	Opponents	Score
Win	Sep 2025	San Francisco, US	Hard (i)	Team World	Andre Agassi; Pat Rafter	Taylor Fritz; Alex de Minaur; Alex Michelsen; Francisco Cerúndolo; Reilly Opelka	Team Europe	Yannick Noah; Tim Henman	Carlos Alcaraz; Alexander Zverev; Holger Rune; Casper Ruud; Flavio Cobolli; Jakub Menšík	15–9

== Junior Grand Slam finals ==
=== Singles: 1 (title) ===
Result	Year	Tournament	Surface	Opponent	Score
Win	2023	US Open	Hard	(United States) Learner Tien	4–6, 6–4, 6–3

=== Doubles: 1 (runner-up) ===
Result	Year	Tournament	Surface	Partner	Opponents	Score
Loss	2023	Australian Open	Hard	(Belgium) Alexander Blockx	(United States) Learner Tien (United States) Cooper Williams	4–6, 4–6

== Wins over top 10 players ==
- Fonseca has a 2–6 record against players who were, at the time the match was played, ranked in the top 10.

Season	2025	2026	Total
Wins	1	1	2

#	Player	Rk	Event	Surface	Rd	Score	Rk	Ref
2025
1.	Andrey Rublev	9	Australian Open, Australia	Hard	1R	7–6^{(7–1)}, 6–3, 7–6^{(7–5)}	112	
2026
2.	(Serbia) Novak Djokovic	4	French Open, France	Clay	3R	4–6, 4–6, 6–3, 7–5, 7–5	30	

- Key: (Rk) first use, opponent rank; (Rd) round; (Rk) 2nd use, player rank; (Ref) reference; (F) final; (SF) semifinal; (QF) quarterfinal; (#R) rounds 4, 3, 2, 1; (RR) round-robin stage; (Q#) qualifying rounds or stages (3), 2, 1.

== Records ==
- These records were attained in the Open Era of tennis.

Tournament	Year	Record accomplished	Player/s tied
Grand Slam tournaments	2026	Defeated Novak Djokovic from two sets down	Jürgen Melzer

== Exhibition matches ==
=== Singles ===
Result	Date	Tournament	Surface	Opponent	Score
Win	Jun 2024	Giorgio Armani Tennis Classic, London, UK	Grass	(Australia) Alexei Popyrin	7–6^{(13–11)}, 6–3
Loss	Dec 2025	Miami Invitational, Miami, US	Hard (i)	(Spain) Carlos Alcaraz	5–7, 6–2, [8–10]
Win	Mar 2026	The MGM Slam, Las Vegas, US	Hard (i)	(France) Gaël Monfils	10–6*
Win	Mar 2026	The MGM Slam, Las Vegas, US	Hard (i)	(Kazakhstan) Alexander Bublik	10–3*
Win	Mar 2026	The MGM Slam, Las Vegas, US	Hard (i)	(United States) Reilly Opelka	[10–6, 7–10, 10–5]*

* non-standard tennis sets

=== Doubles ===
Result	Date	Tournament	Surface	Partner	Opponents	Score
Win	Aug 2025	Stars of the Open, US Open Fan Week, New York, US	Hard	(Argentina) Juan Martín del Potro	(United States) Andy Roddick (United States) Alex Michelsen	11–9*

=== Mixed doubles ===
Result	Date	Tournament	Surface	Partner	Opponents	Score
Loss	Dec 2025	Miami Invitational, Miami, US	Hard (i)	(United States) Amanda Anisimova	(Spain) Carlos Alcaraz (United States) Jessica Pegula	8–10*

== Awards ==
2023

- ITF Junior World Champion

2025

- Troféu ACEESP – Esportista Masculino do Ano
- Prêmio Brasil Olímpico – Atleta Masculino da Torcida (Fan's Choice)

== Notes ==
Awards and achievements
Preceded by (Belgium) Gilles-Arnaud Bailly	ITF Junior World Champion; 2023	Succeeded by (Norway) Nicolai Budkov Kjær
