= Francisco Comesaña =

Argentine tennis player (born 2000)

- Comesaña at 2026 Wimbledon Championships
- Country (sports): Argentina
- Residence: Buenos Aires, Argentina
- Born: 6 October 2000 (age 26) Mar del Plata, Argentina
- Height: 1.78 m (5 ft 10 in)
- Plays: Right-handed (two-handed backhand)
- Coach: Sebastián Gutiérrez
- Prize money: US $2,980,893

Singles
- Career record: 30–45
- Career titles: 0
- Highest ranking: No. 54 (18 August 2025)
- Current ranking: No. 136 (16 November 2026)

Grand Slam singles results
- Australian Open: 2R (2026)
- French Open: 3R (2026)
- Wimbledon: 3R (2024)
- US Open: 3R (2024)

Doubles
- Career record: 2–11
- Career titles: 0
- Highest ranking: No. 257 (8 May 2023)

Grand Slam doubles results
- Australian Open: 1R (2025, 2026)
- French Open: 1R (2025)
- Wimbledon: 1R (2025)
- Last updated on: 17 November 2026.

Francisco Comesaña (born 6 October 2000) is an Argentine professional tennis player. He has a career-high ATP singles ranking of world No. 54 achieved on 18 August 2025 and a doubles ranking of No. 257 reached on 8 May 2023.

== Early life ==
Francisco Comesaña was born in Mar del Plata, Buenos Aires, to father Agustín and mother Adela. As his surname suggests, his family is of Galician descent. He has one brother, Valentín. He began playing tennis around the age of six.

He began his career training at Edison Lawn Tennis in Mar de Plata, which is owned by the family of Horacio Zeballos. In 2021, he moved to Córdoba to train under coach Facundo Argüello. In 2023, he moved back to Buenos Aires to train under coach Sebastián Gutiérrez at the Club de Gimnasia y Esgrima de Buenos Aires.

== Career ==
=== 2022–2023: Maiden Challenger titles ===
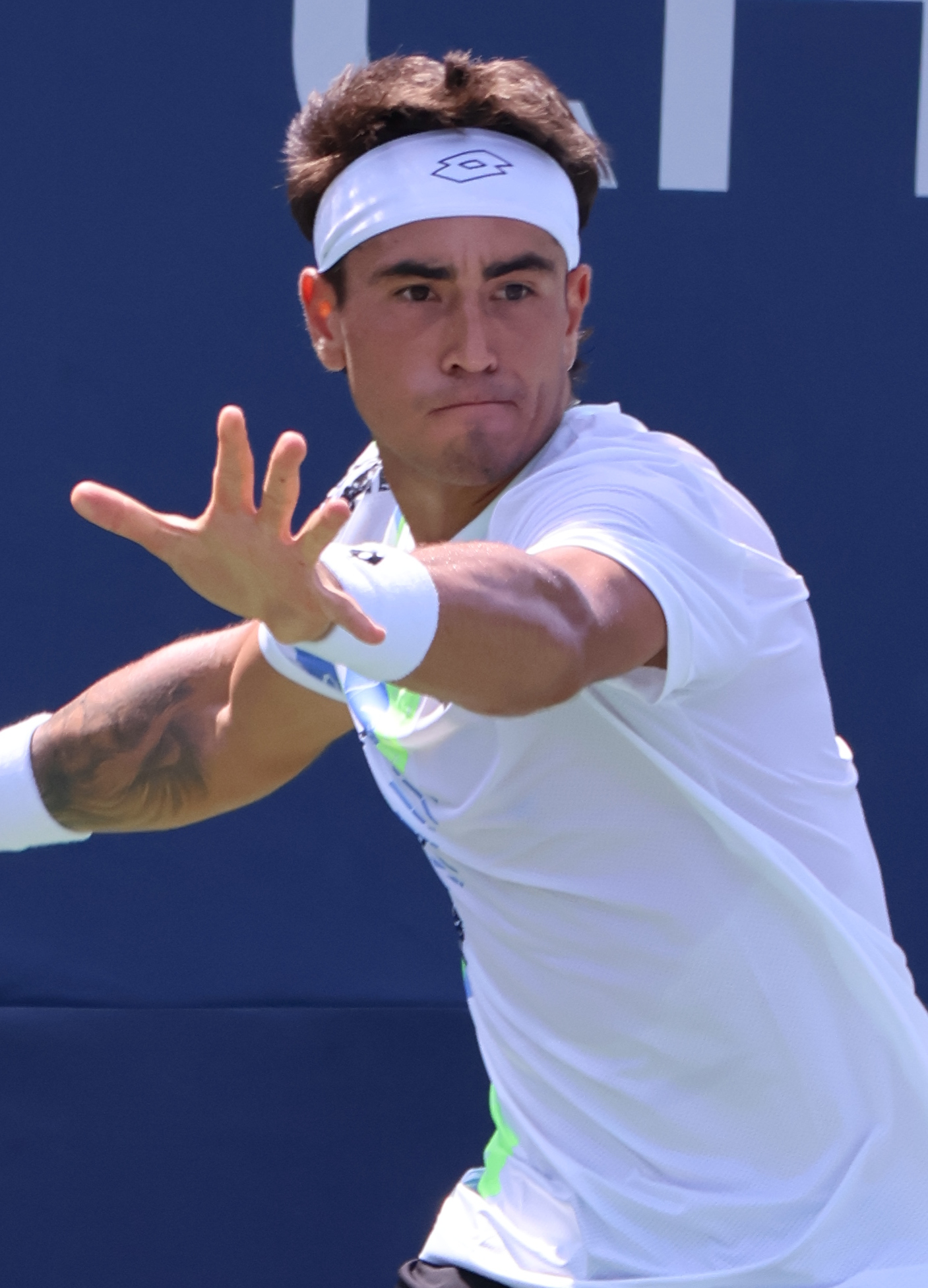
Comesaña at the 2023 US Open

In May 2022, Comesaña won his first ATP Challenger doubles title in Vicenza, partnering Luciano Darderi. The following month, he won back-to-back singles titles at the Corrientes Challenger and the Challenger Tenis Club Argentino, both in his home country and both against Mariano Navone in the final.

In May 2023, he reached the final of the Macedonian Open, but lost to Máté Valkusz. The following week, he won the Internazionali di Tennis Città di Vicenza, defeating Pablo Llamas Ruiz in the final. Later that year, he won his fourth Challenger title at the Svijany Open and reached the final of the Santa Cruz Challenger.

=== 2024: ATP debut, top 100, major third rounds ===
In February 2024, Comesaña made his ATP debut at the Córdoba Open as a wildcard, but lost to compatriot and lucky loser Thiago Agustín Tirante in the first round. He qualified for his first ATP 500 tournament at the Rio Open, but lost to fourth seed and compatriot Francisco Cerúndolo in the first round. He entered the Chile Open as a lucky loser, but lost to Juan Pablo Varillas in the first round. After winning the Challenger title at the Open de Oeiras, he reached the top 100 for the first time on 22 April 2024.

Ranked No. 122, Comesaña made his Grand Slam tournament debut at Wimbledon and upset sixth seed Andrey Rublev in the first round in only his second match on grass ever. This was his first win at the ATP level, his first win at a Major, and his first win over a top 10 player. He then defeated Adam Walton to reach the third round. He lost to 25th seed Lorenzo Musetti in four sets.

On his debut at the US Open, Comesaña reached again the third round of a Grand Slam, defeating Dominic Stricker in the first round, then upsetting 17th-seed Ugo Humbert in the second round. In October, he won his second Challenger title for the season at the 2024 Challenger de Buenos Aires on his 24th birthday.

=== 2025: Masters fourth round, win over world No. 2 ===
Ranked No. 86 at the ATP 500 2025 Rio Open, Comesaña recorded his first two ATP wins outside the Majors defeating wildcard Gustavo Heide and sixth seed Nicolás Jarry (after saving a match point) to reach his first ATP Tour quarterfinal. Both matches lasted over 3 hours, the second match featuring three tiebreaks. He then upset world No. 2 and top seed Alexander Zverev in the quarterfinal, his biggest win by ranking, after trailing 1–4 in the final set, to reach his first ATP tour-level semifinal. He lost to Alexandre Müller after playing for almost three hours, including crashing in the net in the second set, in his fourth three-setter of the week.

The Argentine made his Masters debut at the 2025 Miami Open as a qualifier but lost to 17 year-old debutant and wildcard Federico Cinà.

At the 2025 Cincinnati Open, Comesaña reached the fourth round of a Masters 1000 for the first time defeating 29th seed Luciano Darderi by retirement and Reilly Opelka.

=== 2026 Roland Garros - third round ===
In May 2026, he manages to reach the third round of Roland Garros - his best achievement in the major - after defeating seeded player Luciano Darderi. He loses to Matteo Berrettini at the fifth set in a tie break, in a match which lasted more than 5 hours.

== Performance timeline ==
Key
W	F	SF	QF	#R	RR	Q#	DNQ	A	NH

(W) winner; (F) finalist; (SF) semifinalist; (QF) quarterfinalist; (#R) rounds 4, 3, 2, 1; (RR) round-robin stage; (Q#) qualification round; (DNQ) did not qualify; (A) absent; (NH) not held; (SR) strike rate (events won / competed); (W–L) win–loss record.
To avoid confusion and double counting, these charts are updated at the conclusion of a tournament or when the player's participation has ended.

=== Singles ===
Current through the 2026 French Open.

Tournament	2022	2023	2024	2025	2026	SR	W–L	Win %
Grand Slam tournaments
Australian Open	A	A	Q2	1R	2R	0 / 2	1–2	33%
French Open	A	A	A	1R	3R	0 / 2	2–2	50%
Wimbledon	A	A	3R	1R	Q1	0 / 2	2–2	50%
US Open	Q1	Q3	3R	2R		0 / 1	3–2	67%
Win–loss	0–0	0–0	4–2	1–4	3–2	0 / 8	8–8	50%
ATP Masters 1000
Indian Wells Open	A	A	A	A	A	0 / 0	0–0	–
Miami Open	A	A	A	1R	A	0 / 1	0–1	0%
Monte-Carlo Masters	A	A	A	Q1	A	0 / 0	0–0	–
Madrid Open	A	A	Q2	3R	A	0 / 1	2–1	67%
Italian Open	A	A	A	2R	A	0 / 1	1–1	50%
Canadian Open	A	A	A	2R		0 / 1	1–1	50%
Cincinnati Open	A	A	A	4R		0 / 1	3–1	75%
Shanghai Masters	NH	A	A	2R		0 / 1	1–1	50%
Paris Masters	A	A	A	1R		0 / 1	0–1	0%
Win–loss	0–0	0–0	0–0	8–7	0–0	0 / 7	8–7	53%

== ATP Challenger Tour finals ==
=== Singles: 9 (7 titles, 2 runner-ups) ===
Legend ATP Challenger Tour (7–2)	Finals by surface Hard (1–0) Clay (6–2)

Result	W–L	Date	Tournament	Tier	Surface	Opponent	Score
Win	1–0	Jun 2022	Corrientes, Argentina	Challenger	Clay	(Argentina) Mariano Navone	6–0, 6–3
Win	2–0	Jun 2022	Buenos Aires, Argentina	Challenger	Clay	(Argentina) Mariano Navone	6–4, 6–0
Loss	2–1	May 2023	Skopje, North Macedonia	Challenger	Clay	(Hungary) Máté Valkusz	3–6, 4–6
Win	3–1	Jun 2023	Vicenza, Italy	Challenger	Clay	(Spain) Pablo Llamas Ruiz	3–6, 6–2, 6–2
Win	4–1	Jul 2023	Liberec, Czech Republic	Challenger	Clay	(United States) Toby Kodat	6–2, 6–4
Loss	4–2	Sep 2023	Santa Cruz de la Sierra, Bolivia	Challenger	Clay	(Argentina) Mariano Navone	6–4, 5–7, 1–6
Win	5–2	Apr 2024	Oeiras, Portugal	Challenger	Clay	(France) Ugo Blanchet	6–4, 3–6, 7–5
Win	6–2	Sep 2024	Buenos Aires, Argentina	Challenger	Clay	(Argentina) Federico Coria	1–6, 7–6^{(9–7)}, 6–4
Win	7–2	Nov 2024	São Paulo, Brazil	Challenger	Hard	(Argentina) Thiago Agustín Tirante	7–5, 4–6, 6–4

=== Doubles: 2 (2 titles) ===
Legend ATP Challenger Tour (2–0)

Result	W–L	Date	Tournament	Tier	Surface	Partner	Opponents	Score
Win	1–0	May 2022	Vicenza, Italy	Challenger	Clay	(Italy) Luciano Darderi	(Italy) Matteo Gigante (Italy) Francesco Passaro	6–3, 7–6^{(7–4)}
Win	2–0	Apr 2023	Buenos Aires, Argentina	Challenger	Clay	(Brazil) Thiago Seyboth Wild	(Argentina) Hernán Casanova (Argentina) Santiago Rodríguez Taverna	6–3, 6–7^{(5–7)}, [10–6]

== ITF World Tennis Tour finals ==
=== Singles: 9 (3 titles, 6 runner-ups) ===
Legend ITF WTT (3–6)	Finals by surface Hard (0–0) Clay (3–6)

Result	W–L	Date	Tournament	Tier	Surface	Opponent	Score
Loss	0–1	Jun 2021	M15 Antalya, Turkey	WTT	Clay	(Chile) Gonzalo Lama	4–6, 2–6
Loss	0–2	Jun 2021	M15 Antalya, Turkey	WTT	Clay	(Argentina) Facundo Juárez	7–6^{(7–2)}, 2–6, 3–6
Loss	0–3	Jul 2021	M15 Sofia, Bulgaria	WTT	Clay	(Sweden) Dragoș Nicolae Mădăraș	6–2, 4–6, 6–7^{(6–8)}
Loss	0–4	Jul 2021	M25 Kottingbrunn, Austria	WTT	Clay	(Hungary) Máté Valkusz	1–6, 2–6
Loss	0–5	Aug 2021	M15 Novi Sad, Serbia	WTT	Clay	(Austria) Filip Misolic	4–6, 3–6
Loss	0–6	Nov 2021	M15 Córdoba, Argentina	WTT	Clay	(Argentina) Juan Bautista Torres	2–6, 2–6
Win	1–6	Dec 2021	M25 Villa Allende, Argentina	WTT	Clay	(Argentina) Juan Pablo Paz	7–6^{(7–4)}, 7–6^{(7–5)}
Win	2–6	Feb 2022	M15 Punta Cana, Dominican Republic	WTT	Clay	(Dominican Republic) Roberto Cid Subervi	4–6, 7–5, 6–1
Win	3–6	Mar 2023	M25 Tucumán, Argentina	WTT	Clay	(Argentina) Santiago Rodríguez Taverna	7–5, 6–7^{(6–8)}, 6–3

== Wins over top 10 players ==
- Comesaña has a 2–5 (28.57%) record against players who were, at the time the match was played, ranked in the top 10.

Season	2024	2025	2026	Total
Wins	1	1	0	2

#	Player	Rank	Event	Surface	Rd	Score	FCR
2024
1.	Andrey Rublev	6	Wimbledon, United Kingdom	Grass	1R	6–4, 5–7, 6–2, 7–6^{(7–5)}	122
2025
2.	(Germany) Alexander Zverev	2	Rio Open, Brazil	Clay	QF	4–6, 6–3, 6–4	86

*As of 24 October 2025
