= Challenger Tenis Club Argentino =

Tennis tournament in Argentina

Challenger AAT de TCA

Tournament information
- Event name: Challenger AAT de Tenis Club Argentino
- Location: Buenos Aires, Argentina
- Venue: Tenis Club Argentino (TCA)
- Category: ATP Challenger Tour
- Surface: Clay
- Website: Website

The Challenger AAT de Tenis Club Argentino (TCA) is a professional tennis tournament played on clay courts. It is part of the Association of Tennis Professionals (ATP) Challenger Tour. It has been held in Buenos Aires, Argentina, since 2022. The tournament was originally scheduled to be held in Villa Allende but was moved to Buenos Aires at the Tenis Club Argentino, due to operational issues at the venue in Villa Allende.

== Past finals ==
=== Singles ===
Year	Champion	Runner-up	Score
2026	(Italy) Franco Agamenone	(Argentina) Andrea Collarini	3–6, 6–4, 6–2
2025	Not held		
2024 (2)	(Argentina) Facundo Bagnis	(Argentina) Mariano Navone	7–5, 1–6, 7–5
2024 (1)	(Peru) Gonzalo Bueno	(Kazakhstan) Dmitry Popko	6–4, 2–6, 7–6^{(7–4)}
2023	(Brazil) Thiago Seyboth Wild	(Italy) Luciano Darderi	6–3, 6–3
2022	(Argentina) Francisco Comesaña	(Argentina) Mariano Navone	6–4, 6–0

=== Doubles ===
Year	Champions	Runners-up	Score
2026	(Argentina) Mariano Kestelboim (Brazil) Marcelo Zormann	(Romania) Alexandru Jecan (Romania) Bogdan Pavel	6–3, 6–4
2025	Not held		
2024 (2)	(Brazil) João Fonseca (Brazil) Pedro Sakamoto	(Germany) Jakob Schnaitter (Germany) Mark Wallner	6–2, 6–2
2024 (1)	(Peru) Arklon Huertas del Pino (Peru) Conner Huertas del Pino	(Netherlands) Max Houkes (Austria) Lukas Neumayer	6–3, 3–6, [10–6]
2023	(Argentina) Francisco Comesaña (Brazil) Thiago Seyboth Wild	(Argentina) Hernán Casanova (Argentina) Santiago Rodríguez Taverna	6–3, 6–7^{(5–7)}, [10–6]
2022	(Peru) Arklon Huertas del Pino (Peru) Conner Huertas del Pino	(Argentina) Matías Franco Descotte (Argentina) Alejo Lorenzo Lingua Lavallén	7–5, 4–6, [11–9]
