= Conner Huertas del Pino =

Peruvian tennis player (born 1995)

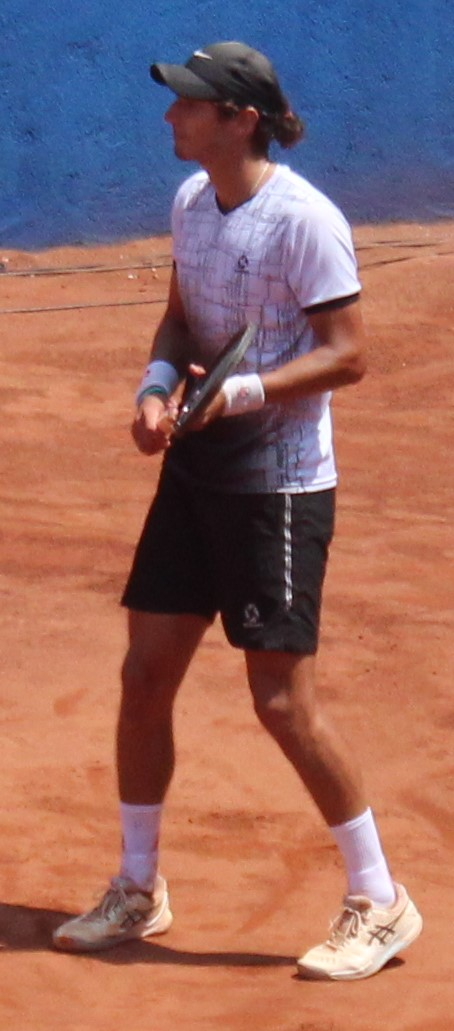
- Huertas del Pino at the 2023 Pan American Games
- Country (sports): Peru
- Residence: Lima, Peru
- Born: 20 December 1995 (age 30) Lima, Peru
- Height: 1.88 m (6 ft 2 in)
- Plays: Right-handed (two-handed backhand)
- College: Auburn
- Prize money: US $140,458

Singles
- Career record: 2–2 (at ATP Tour level, Grand Slam level, and in Davis Cup)
- Career titles: 0
- Highest ranking: No. 520 (1 August 2022)
- Current ranking: No. 642 (10 August 2026)

Doubles
- Career record: 2–2 (at ATP Tour level, Grand Slam level, and in Davis Cup)
- Career titles: 7 Challenger, 20 Futures
- Highest ranking: No. 174 (14 July 2025)
- Current ranking: No. 320 (10 August 2026)
- Last updated on: 21 August 2026.

Conner Huertas del Pino (born 20 December 1995) is a Peruvian tennis player. Huertas del Pino has a career high ATP singles ranking of No. 520 achieved on 1 August 2022 and a career high ATP doubles ranking of No. 174 achieved on 14 July 2025.

Huertas del Pino represents Peru at the Davis Cup, where he has a W/L record of 0–2.

== Personal life ==
Huertas del Pino is the younger brother of fellow tennis player Arklon Huertas del Pino.

In July 2025, he was given a provisional suspension after failing an anti-doping test at an ATP Challenger event in Colombia in May that year.

== ATP Challenger finals ==
=== Doubles ===
Result	W–L	Date	Tournament	Surface	Partner	Opponents	Score
Win	1–0	Jan 2022	Buenos Aires, Argentina	Clay	(Germany) Mats Rosenkranz	(Argentina) Matías Franco Descotte (Argentina) Facundo Díaz Acosta	5–6, ret.
Win	2–0	Jun 2022	Buenos Aires, Argentina	Clay	(Peru) Arklon Huertas del Pino	(Argentina) Matías Franco Descotte (Argentina) Alejo Lorenzo Lingua Lavallén	7–5, 4–6, [11–9]
Win	3–0	Nov 2023	Guayaquil, Ecuador	Clay	(Peru) Arklon Huertas del Pino	(Switzerland) Luca Margaroli (Argentina) Santiago Rodríguez Taverna	6–3, 6–1
Win	4–0	Jan 2024	Buenos Aires, Argentina	Clay	(Peru) Arklon Huertas del Pino	(Netherlands) Max Houkes (Austria) Lukas Neumayer	6–3, 3–6, [10–6]
Win	5–0	Sep 2024	Cali, Colombia	Clay	(Canada) Juan Carlos Aguilar	(Colombia) Juan Sebastián Gómez (Colombia) Johan Alexander Rodríguez	5–7, 6–3, [10–7]
Win	6–0	Apr 2025	San Miguel de Tucumán, Argentina	Clay	(Bolivia) Federico Zeballos	(Argentina) Luciano Emanuel Ambrogi (Argentina) Máximo Zeitune	1–6, 6–2, [10–8]
Loss	6–1	May 2025	Bogotá, Colombia	Clay	(Peru) Arklon Huertas del Pino	(Brazil) Luís Britto (Czech Republic) Zdeněk Kolář	4–6, 6–7^{(4–7)}
Win	7–1	May 2026	Córdoba, Argentina	Clay	(Peru) Arklon Huertas del Pino	(Argentina) Ignacio Monzón (Chile) Nicolás Villalón	6–3, 6–4
Loss	7–2	Jun 2026	Asunción, Paraguay	Clay	(Peru) Arklon Huertas del Pino	(Uruguay) Joaquín Aguilar Cardozo (Argentina) Santiago de la Fuente	6–7^{(4–7)}, 3–6
Loss	7–3	Jun 2026	Piracicaba, Brazil	Clay	(Peru) Arklon Huertas del Pino	(Brazil) Luís Felipe Miguel (Brazil) Paulo André Saraiva dos Santos	3–6, 6–7^{(0–7)}
