= Arklon Huertas del Pino =

Peruvian tennis player

- Country (sports): Peru
- Residence: Lima, Peru
- Born: 16 July 1994 (age 32) Lima, Peru
- Height: 1.83 m (6 ft 0 in)
- Plays: Right-handed (two-handed backhand)
- College: University of Indianapolis
- Coach: Luis Horna
- Prize money: US $140,204

Singles
- Career record: 1–0 (at ATP Tour level, Grand Slam level, and in Davis Cup)
- Career titles: 2 ITF
- Highest ranking: No. 453 (18 July 2022)
- Current ranking: No. 755 (2 October 2026)

Doubles
- Career record: 2–6 (at ATP Tour level, Grand Slam level, and in Davis Cup)
- Career titles: 2 Challenger, 24 ITF
- Highest ranking: No. 174 (15 January 2024)
- Current ranking: No. 248 (2 October 2026)
- Last updated on: 8 October 2026.

Arklon Huertas del Pino Cordova (born 16 July 1994) is a Peruvian tennis player. He has a career high ATP singles ranking of No. 453 achieved on 18 July 2022 and a career high ATP doubles ranking of No. 174 achieved on 15 January 2024.

Huertas del Pino represents Peru at the Davis Cup, where he has a W/L record of 0–2.

== Personal life ==
Huertas del Pino is the older brother of fellow tennis player Conner Huertas del Pino.

Huertas del Pino has previously been banned from competition for as long as two years due to cannabis use.
