= 2022 Lima Challenger =

- Date: 8–14 August
- Edition: 17th
- Surface: Clay
- Location: Lima, Peru

Champions

Singles
- (Argentina) Camilo Ugo Carabelli

Doubles
- (Uruguay) Ignacio Carou / (Argentina) Facundo Mena
← 2021 ·	Lima Challenger	· 2022 →

The 2022 DirectTV Open Lima Challenger was a professional tennis tournament played on clay courts. It was the 17th edition of the tournament which was part of the 2022 ATP Challenger Tour. It took place in Lima, Peru at the Jockey Club del Perú between 8 and 14 August 2022.

== Singles main-draw entrants ==
=== Seeds ===
Country	Player	Rank^{1}	Seed
ARG	Tomás Martín Etcheverry	88	1
PER	Juan Pablo Varillas	97	2
ARG	Camilo Ugo Carabelli	116	3
ARG	Juan Pablo Ficovich	128	4
ARG	Facundo Mena	134	5
ARG	Renzo Olivo	195	6
ARG	Thiago Agustín Tirante	196	7
POR	Gastão Elias	200	8

- ^{1} Rankings are as of 1 August 2022.

=== Other entrants ===
The following players received wildcards into the singles main draw:

- (Peru) Gianluca Ballotta
- (Peru) Gonzalo Bueno
- (Peru) Ignacio Buse

The following players received entry into the singles main draw as alternates:

- (Mexico) ~~Alex Hernández~~
- (Peru) Conner Huertas del Pino
- (United States) Patrick Kypson

The following players received entry from the qualifying draw:

- (Uruguay) Ignacio Carou
- (Argentina) Tomás Farjat
- (Colombia) Juan Sebastián Gómez
- (Argentina) Juan Bautista Otegui
- (Peru) Jorge Panta
- (Brazil) Eduardo Ribeiro

The following player received entry as a lucky loser:

- (Colombia) Alejandro Hoyos

== Champions ==
=== Singles ===
- (Argentina) Camilo Ugo Carabelli def. (Argentina) Thiago Agustín Tirante 6–2, 7–6^{(7–4)}.

=== Doubles ===
- (Uruguay) Ignacio Carou / (Argentina) Facundo Mena def. (Brazil) Orlando Luz / (Argentina) Camilo Ugo Carabelli 6–2, 6–2.
