= 2022 Lima Challenger – Singles =

Singles
- 2022 Lima Challenger

Final
- Champion: (Argentina) Camilo Ugo Carabelli
- Runner-up: (Argentina) Thiago Agustín Tirante
- Score: 6–2, 7–6^{(7–4)}

Events
Singles	Doubles
← 2021 ·	Lima Challenger	· 2022 →

Nicolás Jarry was the defending champion but chose not to defend his title.

Camilo Ugo Carabelli won the title after defeating Thiago Agustín Tirante 6–2, 7–6^{(7–4)} in the final.

== Seeds ==
1. (Argentina) Tomás Martín Etcheverry (semifinals)
2. (Peru) Juan Pablo Varillas (quarterfinals)
3. (Argentina) Camilo Ugo Carabelli (champion)
4. (Argentina) Juan Pablo Ficovich (first round)
5. (Argentina) Facundo Mena (quarterfinals)
6. (Argentina) Renzo Olivo (quarterfinals)
7. (Argentina) Thiago Agustín Tirante (final)
8. (Portugal) Gastão Elias (quarterfinals)

== Draw ==
=== Key ===
- Q = Qualifier
- WC = Wild card
- LL = Lucky loser
- Alt = Alternate
- SE = Special exempt
- PR = Protected ranking
- ITF = ITF entry
- JE = Junior exempt
- w/o = Walkover
- r = Retired
- d = Defaulted
- SR = Special ranking

=== Finals ===
Semifinals
1	(Argentina) Tomás Martín Etcheverry	3	6	5
3	(Argentina) Camilo Ugo Carabelli	6	3	7
WC	(Peru) Gonzalo Bueno	6^{5}	6	5
7	(Argentina) Thiago Agustín Tirante	7^{7}	4	7

Final
3	(Argentina) Camilo Ugo Carabelli	6	7^{7}
7	(Argentina) Thiago Agustín Tirante	2	6^{4}

=== Top half ===
First round
1	(Argentina) TM Etcheverry	6	6
Q	(Colombia) JS Gómez	2	3
(Ecuador) R Quiroz	3	6	6
(Brazil) O Luz	6	4	2
(Peru) N Álvarez	2	5
Q	(Peru) J Panta	6	7
(Brazil) D Dutra da Silva	6	3	6^{3}
6	(Argentina) R Olivo	3	6	7^{7}
3	(Argentina) C Ugo Carabelli	6	6
(Colombia) N Mejía	2	3
LL	(Colombia) Alejandro Hoyos	7^{7}	6
WC	(Peru) Gianluca Ballotta	6^{4}	4
(Peru) A Huertas del Pino	7^{7}	4	6
(Serbia) P Krstin	6^{4}	6	1
Q	(Argentina) Tomás Farjat	5	0
5	(Argentina) F Mena	7	6

Second round
1	(Argentina) TM Etcheverry	6	6
(Ecuador) R Quiroz	2	3
Q	(Peru) J Panta	1	4
6	(Argentina) R Olivo	6	6
3	(Argentina) C Ugo Carabelli	6	6
LL	(Colombia) A Hoyos	1	1
(Peru) A Huertas del Pino	3	2
5	(Argentina) F Mena	6	6

Quarterfinals
1	(Argentina) TM Etcheverry	7^{7}	6^{2}	7
6	(Argentina) R Olivo	6^{5}	7^{7}	5
3	(Argentina) C Ugo Carabelli	7^{7}	6
5	(Argentina) F Mena	6^{4}	1

Semifinals
1	(Argentina) TM Etcheverry	3	6	5
3	(Argentina) C Ugo Carabelli	6	3	7

=== Bottom half ===
First round
8	(Portugal) G Elias	7^{7}	3	7
(Argentina) Facundo Juárez	6^{2}	6	5
WC	(Peru) I Buse	6	6
Q	(Brazil) E Ribeiro	0	2
(Argentina) G Villanueva	2	3
(Argentina) RA Burruchaga	6	6
WC	(Peru) G Bueno	7	6
4	(Argentina) JP Ficovich	5	3
7	(Argentina) TA Tirante	6	6
Alt	(Peru) C Huertas del Pino	3	2
Alt	(United States) P Kypson	5	5
(United States) N Chappell	7	7
Q	(Uruguay) I Carou	3	7^{7}	1
Q	(Argentina) Juan Bautista Otegui	6	6^{4}	6
(Brazil) Pedro Boscardin Dias	3	2
2	(Peru) JP Varillas	6	6

Second round
8	(Portugal) G Elias	7^{7}	6
WC	(Peru) I Buse	6^{5}	1
(Argentina) RA Burruchaga	5	5
WC	(Peru) G Bueno	7	7
7	(Argentina) TA Tirante	6	6
(United States) N Chappell	4	0
Q	(Argentina) JB Otegui	1	2
2	(Peru) JP Varillas	6	6

Quarterfinals
8	(Portugal) G Elias	6	6^{2}	0
WC	(Peru) G Bueno	2	7^{7}	6
7	(Argentina) TA Tirante	6	6
2	(Peru) JP Varillas	4	3

Semifinals
WC	(Peru) G Bueno	6^{5}	6	5
7	(Argentina) TA Tirante	7^{7}	4	7
