= 2021 Lima Challenger II – Doubles =

Doubles
- 2021 Lima Challenger II

Final
- Champions: (Peru) Sergio Galdós (Portugal) Gonçalo Oliveira
- Runners-up: (Chile) Marcelo Tomás Barrios Vera (Chile) Alejandro Tabilo
- Score: 6–2, 2–6, [10–5]

Events
Singles	Doubles
- Lima Challenger

Julian Lenz and Gerald Melzer were the defending champions but chose not to defend their title.

Sergio Galdós and Gonçalo Oliveira won the title after defeating Marcelo Tomás Barrios Vera and Alejandro Tabilo 6–2, 2–6, [10–5] in the final.

== Seeds ==
1. (Brazil) Orlando Luz / (Venezuela) Luis David Martínez (first round)
2. (Peru) Sergio Galdós / (Portugal) Gonçalo Oliveira (champions)
3. (Brazil) Fernando Romboli / (Bolivia) Federico Zeballos (quarterfinals)
4. (Colombia) Nicolás Barrientos / (Colombia) Alejandro Gómez (semifinals)

== Draw ==
Key

- Q = Qualifier
- WC = Wild card
- LL = Lucky loser
- Alt = Alternate
- ITF = ITF entry
- PR = Protected ranking
- SR = Special ranking
- SE = Special exempt
- JE = Junior exempt
- JR = Junior Accelerator Programme entrant
- CO = College Accelerator Programme entrant
- NG = Next Gen Accelerator Program entrant
- w/o = Walkover
- r = Retired
- d = Defaulted

First round
1	(Brazil) O Luz (Venezuela) LD Martínez	4	7	[8]
(Argentina) H Casanova (Argentina) A Collarini	6	5	[10]
WC	(Peru) G Bueno (Peru) I Buse	6	0
WC	(Peru) A Huertas del Pino (Peru) C Huertas del Pino	2	0^{r}
3	(Brazil) F Romboli (Bolivia) F Zeballos	6	7
(Switzerland) L Castelnuovo (Canada) A Galarneau	2	5
(Chile) MT Barrios Vera (Chile) A Tabilo	5	7^{7}	[10]
(Ecuador) D Hidalgo (Colombia) C Rodríguez	7	6^{4}	[5]
WC	(Dominican Republic) P Bertran (Peru) J Panta	4	4
(Argentina) TM Etcheverry (Argentina) R Olivo	6	6
(Netherlands) J de Jong (Netherlands) B Stevens	6	6^{5}	[4]
4	(Colombia) N Barrientos (Colombia) A Gómez	3	7^{7}	[10]
(Bulgaria) A Lazarov (Czech Republic) J Pospíšil
(Czech Republic) V Kopřiva (Peru) A Merino	w/o
(Serbia) P Krstin (Bulgaria) D Kuzmanov
2	(Peru) S Galdós (Portugal) G Oliveira	w/o

Quarterfinals
(Argentina) H Casanova (Argentina) A Collarini	6	6
WC	(Peru) G Bueno (Peru) I Buse	3	1
3	(Brazil) F Romboli (Bolivia) F Zeballos	6	2	[9]
(Chile) MT Barrios Vera (Chile) A Tabilo	4	6	[11]
(Argentina) TM Etcheverry (Argentina) R Olivo	3	2
4	(Colombia) N Barrientos (Colombia) A Gómez	6	6
(Czech Republic) V Kopřiva (Peru) A Merino	1	6^{6}
2	(Peru) S Galdós (Portugal) G Oliveira	6	7^{8}

Semifinals
(Argentina) H Casanova (Argentina) A Collarini	7	2	[9]
(Chile) MT Barrios Vera (Chile) A Tabilo	5	6	[11]
4	(Colombia) N Barrientos (Colombia) A Gómez	6	5	[7]
2	(Peru) S Galdós (Portugal) G Oliveira	1	7	[10]

Final
(Chile) MT Barrios Vera (Chile) A Tabilo	2	6	[5]
2	(Peru) S Galdós (Portugal) G Oliveira	6	2	[10]
