= 2022 Lima Challenger – Doubles =

Doubles
- 2022 Lima Challenger

Final
- Champions: (Uruguay) Ignacio Carou (Argentina) Facundo Mena
- Runners-up: (Brazil) Orlando Luz (Argentina) Camilo Ugo Carabelli
- Score: 6–2, 6–2

Events
Singles	Doubles
- Lima Challenger

Sergio Galdós and Gonçalo Oliveira were the defending champions but only Galdós chose to defend his title, partnering Renzo Olivo. Galdós lost in the semifinals to Orlando Luz and Camilo Ugo Carabelli.

Ignacio Carou and Facundo Mena won the title after defeating Luz and Ugo Carabelli 6–2, 6–2 in the final.

== Seeds ==
1. (Colombia) Nicolás Mejía / (Ecuador) Roberto Quiroz (semifinals, withdrew)
2. (Peru) Sergio Galdós / (Argentina) Renzo Olivo (semifinals)
3. (Brazil) Orlando Luz / (Argentina) Camilo Ugo Carabelli (final)
4. (Peru) Arklon Huertas del Pino / (Peru) Conner Huertas del Pino (first round)

== Draw ==
Key

- Q = Qualifier
- WC = Wild card
- LL = Lucky loser
- Alt = Alternate
- ITF = ITF entry
- PR = Protected ranking
- SR = Special ranking
- SE = Special exempt
- JE = Junior exempt
- JR = Junior Accelerator Programme entrant
- CO = College Accelerator Programme entrant
- NG = Next Gen Accelerator Program entrant
- w/o = Walkover
- r = Retired
- d = Defaulted

First round
(Colombia) JS Gómez (Japan) Kosuke Ogura	6	6
(Argentina) Facundo Juárez (Brazil) Gabriel Roveri Sidney	4	4
4	(Peru) A Huertas del Pino (Peru) C Huertas del Pino	0	6^{3}
(Peru) G Bueno (Peru) I Buse	6	7^{7}
(Uruguay) I Carou (Argentina) F Mena	w/o
(Peru) N Álvarez (Brazil) D Dutra da Silva
(United Kingdom) Blu Baker (United States) N Chappell	6	2	[6]
(Peru) A Merino (Peru) J Panta	3	6	[10]
(Bolivia) A Mendoza (Colombia) A Urrea	2	3
Alt	(Argentina) Juan Bautista Otegui (Argentina) TA Tirante	6	6

Quarterfinals
1	(Colombia) N Mejía (Ecuador) R Quiroz	4	6	[10]
(Colombia) JS Gómez (Japan) K Ogura	6	4	[5]
(Peru) G Bueno (Peru) I Buse	6	4	[4]
(Uruguay) I Carou (Argentina) F Mena	2	6	[10]
(Peru) A Merino (Peru) J Panta	3	3
3	(Brazil) O Luz (Argentina) C Ugo Carabelli	6	6
Alt	(Argentina) JB Otegui (Argentina) TA Tirante	6^{4}	3
2	(Peru) S Galdós (Argentina) R Olivo	7^{7}	6

Semifinals
1	(Colombia) N Mejía (Ecuador) R Quiroz
(Uruguay) I Carou (Argentina) F Mena	w/o
3	(Brazil) O Luz (Argentina) C Ugo Carabelli	6	3	[10]
2	(Peru) S Galdós (Argentina) R Olivo	3	6	[7]

Final
(Uruguay) I Carou (Argentina) F Mena	6	6
3	(Brazil) O Luz (Argentina) C Ugo Carabelli	2	2
