= 2022 Lima Challenger II =

- Date: 24–30 October
- Edition: 18th
- Surface: Clay
- Location: Lima, Peru

Champions

Singles
- (Germany) Daniel Altmaier

Doubles
- (Netherlands) Jesper de Jong / (Netherlands) Max Houkes
← 2022 ·	Lima Challenger	· 2023 →

The 2022 DirecTV Open Lima Challenger II, was a professional tennis tournament played on clay courts. It was the 18th edition of the tournament which was part of the 2022 ATP Challenger Tour. It took place in Lima, Peru at the Tennis Club Las Terrazas Miraflores between 24 and 30 October 2022.

== Singles main-draw entrants ==
=== Seeds ===
Country	Player	Rank^{1}	Seed
ARG	Federico Coria	71	1
ARG	Tomás Martín Etcheverry	87	2
ITA	Marco Cecchinato	98	3
GER	Daniel Altmaier	103	4
PER	Juan Pablo Varillas	123	5
ARG	Camilo Ugo Carabelli	126	6
~~ARG~~	~~Juan Manuel Cerúndolo~~	~~156~~	~~7~~
KAZ	Timofey Skatov	158	8

- ^{1} Rankings are as of 17 October 2022.

=== Other entrants ===
The following players received wildcards into the singles main draw:

- (Peru) Nicolás Álvarez
- (Peru) Gonzalo Bueno
- (Peru) Ignacio Buse

The following player received entry into the singles main draw as a special exempt:

- (Brazil) João Lucas Reis da Silva

The following player received entry into the singles main draw as an alternate:

- (Argentina) Thiago Agustín Tirante

The following players received entry from the qualifying draw:

- (United Kingdom) Jan Choinski
- (Netherlands) Max Houkes
- (Serbia) Nikola Milojević
- (France) Giovanni Mpetshi Perricard
- (Argentina) Genaro Alberto Olivieri
- (Brazil) Thiago Seyboth Wild

The following players received entry as lucky losers:

- (Argentina) Román Andrés Burruchaga
- (Argentina) Mariano Navone
- (Serbia) Miljan Zekić

== Champions ==
=== Singles ===
- (Germany) Daniel Altmaier def. (Argentina) Tomás Martín Etcheverry 6–1, 6–7^{(4–7)}, 6–4.

=== Doubles ===
- (Netherlands) Jesper de Jong / (Netherlands) Max Houkes def. (Argentina) Guido Andreozzi / (Argentina) Guillermo Durán 7–6^{(8–6)}, 3–6, [12–10].
