= 2025 Copa Sevilla – Singles =

Singles
- 2025 Copa Sevilla

Final
- Champion: (Peru) Ignacio Buse
- Runner-up: (Argentina) Genaro Alberto Olivieri
- Score: 6–3, 3–6, 6–3

Events
Singles	Doubles
- Copa Sevilla

Roberto Carballés Baena was the defending champion but retired from his first round match against Genaro Alberto Olivieri.

Ignacio Buse won the title after defeating Olivieri 6–3, 3–6, 6–3 in the final.

== Seeds ==
1. (Spain) Roberto Carballés Baena (first round, retired)
2. (Spain) Carlos Taberner (quarterfinals)
3. (Portugal) Jaime Faria (second round)
4. (Serbia) Dušan Lajović (semifinals, retired)
5. (Chile) Tomás Barrios Vera (first round)
6. (Peru) Ignacio Buse (champion)
7. (Spain) Pablo Carreño Busta (quarterfinals)
8. (Lithuania) Vilius Gaubas (quarterfinals)

== Draw ==
Key

- Q = Qualifier
- WC = Wild card
- LL = Lucky loser
- Alt = Alternate
- ITF = ITF entry
- PR = Protected ranking
- SR = Special ranking
- SE = Special exempt
- JE = Junior exempt
- JR = Junior Accelerator Programme entrant
- CO = College Accelerator Programme entrant
- NG = Next Gen Accelerator Program entrant
- w/o = Walkover
- r = Retired
- d = Defaulted

=== Finals ===
Semifinals
(Argentina) Genaro Alberto Olivieri	7	3
4	(Serbia) Dušan Lajović	5	2^{r}
(Spain) Daniel Mérida	7^{7}	2	3
6	(Peru) Ignacio Buse	6^{4}	6	6

Final
(Argentina) Genaro Alberto Olivieri	3	6	3
6	(Peru) Ignacio Buse	6	3	6

=== Top half ===
First round
1	(Spain) R Carballés Baena	7	6^{4}	0^{r}
(Argentina) GA Olivieri	5	7^{7}	3
(Spain) P Martín Tiffon	3	2
(Portugal) H Rocha	6	6
Q	(Czech Republic) J Forejtek	6	6
Alt	(Italy) L Giustino	2	3
(Spain) A Ramos Viñolas	5	6	5
8	(Lithuania) V Gaubas	7	4	7
4	(Serbia) D Lajović	7^{7}	6^{2}	6
(Sweden) E Ymer	6^{4}	7^{7}	1
Q	(Latvia) R Strombachs	6	3	3
(Portugal) F Ferreira Silva	3	6	6
(Peru) G Bueno	0	2
WC	(Spain) J Barranco Cosano	6	6
Alt	(Spain) D Rincón	2	2
7	(Spain) P Carreño Busta	6	6

Second round
(Argentina) GA Olivieri	0	7	6
(Portugal) H Rocha	6	5	2
Q	(Czech Republic) J Forejtek	7^{7}	6^{5}	4
8	(Lithuania) V Gaubas	6^{3}	7^{7}	6
4	(Serbia) D Lajović	6	6
(Portugal) F Ferreira Silva	4	4
WC	(Spain) J Barranco Cosano	3	2
7	(Spain) P Carreño Busta	6	6

Quarterfinals
(Argentina) GA Olivieri	1	6	7
8	(Lithuania) V Gaubas	6	3	5
4	(Serbia) D Lajović	6	3	6
7	(Spain) P Carreño Busta	4	6	3

Semifinals
(Argentina) GA Olivieri	7	3
4	(Serbia) D Lajović	5	2^{r}

=== Bottom half ===
First round
5	(Chile) T Barrios Vera	1	3
Q	(Spain) D Jordà Sanchis	6	6
Q	(Spain) Carlos López Montagud	6	6
(Spain) C Sánchez Jover	1	3
(Spain) D Mérida	3	6	6
(Germany) C Negritu	6	3	2
(Spain) N Álvarez Varona	6	3	4
3	(Portugal) J Faria	3	6	6
6	(Peru) I Buse	7^{7}	6
WC	(Spain) B Zapata Miralles	6^{3}	3
(Argentina) F Díaz Acosta	4	0
WC	(Spain) P Llamas Ruiz	6	6
(Netherlands) G den Ouden	6	3	6
Q	(Czech Republic) D Kellovský	4	6	1
Q	(Spain) Àlex Martínez	2	6	3
2	(Spain) C Taberner	6	1	6

Second round
Q	(Spain) D Jordà Sanchis	4	6	6
Q	(Spain) C López Montagud	6	4	3
(Spain) D Mérida	4	7	6
3	(Portugal) J Faria	6	5	4
6	(Peru) I Buse	6	6
WC	(Spain) P Llamas Ruiz	3	1
(Netherlands) G den Ouden	3	1^{r}
2	(Spain) C Taberner	6	3

Quarterfinals
Q	(Spain) D Jordà Sanchis	4	4
(Spain) D Mérida	6	6
6	(Peru) I Buse	6	6
2	(Spain) C Taberner	3	2

Semifinals
(Spain) D Mérida	7^{7}	2	3
6	(Peru) I Buse	6^{4}	6	6
