= 2022 Lima Challenger II – Singles =

Singles
- 2022 Lima Challenger II

Final
- Champion: (Germany) Daniel Altmaier
- Runner-up: (Argentina) Tomás Martín Etcheverry
- Score: 6–1, 6–7^{(4–7)}, 6–4

Events
Singles	Doubles
← 2022 ·	Lima Challenger	· 2023 →

Camilo Ugo Carabelli was the defending champion but lost in the second round to Giovanni Mpetshi Perricard.

Daniel Altmaier won the title after defeating Tomás Martín Etcheverry 6–1, 6–7^{(4–7)}, 6–4 in the final.

== Seeds ==
1. (Argentina) Federico Coria (semifinals)
2. (Argentina) Tomás Martín Etcheverry (final)
3. (Italy) Marco Cecchinato (second round)
4. (Germany) Daniel Altmaier (champion)
5. (Peru) Juan Pablo Varillas (first round)
6. (Argentina) Camilo Ugo Carabelli (second round)
7. (Argentina) Juan Manuel Cerúndolo (withdrew)
8. (Kazakhstan) Timofey Skatov (second round)

== Draw ==
=== Key ===
- Q = Qualifier
- WC = Wild card
- LL = Lucky loser
- Alt = Alternate
- SE = Special exempt
- PR = Protected ranking
- ITF = ITF entry
- JE = Junior exempt
- w/o = Walkover
- r = Retired
- d = Defaulted
- SR = Special ranking

=== Finals ===
Semifinals
1	(Argentina) Federico Coria	3	3
4	(Germany) Daniel Altmaier	6	6
LL	(Argentina) Román Andrés Burruchaga	2	6	3
2	(Argentina) Tomás Martín Etcheverry	6	3	6

Final
4	(Germany) Daniel Altmaier	6	6^{4}	6
2	(Argentina) Tomás Martín Etcheverry	1	7^{7}	4

=== Top half ===
First round
1	(Argentina) F Coria	6	6
Q	(Netherlands) M Houkes	3	3
(Brazil) D Dutra da Silva	2	6	3
WC	(Peru) I Buse	6	1	6
Q	(France) G Mpetshi Perricard	4	6	6
(Argentina) R Olivo	6	3	2
LL	(Argentina) M Navone	2	3
6	(Argentina) C Ugo Carabelli	6	6
4	(Germany) D Altmaier	5	7	6
(Argentina) N Kicker	7	5	4
(Argentina) A Collarini	4	2
(Italy) F Agamenone	6	6
(Argentina) H Casanova	3	4
(Argentina) S Rodríguez Taverna	6	6
WC	(Peru) G Bueno	4	1
8	(Kazakhstan) T Skatov	6	6

Second round
1	(Argentina) F Coria	6	4	6
WC	(Peru) I Buse	4	6	2
Q	(France) G Mpetshi Perricard	7	7
6	(Argentina) C Ugo Carabelli	5	5
4	(Germany) D Altmaier	7	3	6
(Italy) F Agamenone	5	6	3
(Argentina) S Rodríguez Taverna	6	6
8	(Kazakhstan) T Skatov	2	2

Quarterfinals
1	(Argentina) F Coria	7^{7}	7^{7}
Q	(France) G Mpetshi Perricard	6^{4}	6^{5}
4	(Germany) D Altmaier	3	7	6
(Argentina) S Rodríguez Taverna	6	5	2

Semifinals
1	(Argentina) F Coria	3	3
4	(Germany) D Altmaier	6	6

=== Bottom half ===
First round
LL	(Argentina) RA Burruchaga	6^{6}	7^{7}	6
SE	(Brazil) JL Reis da Silva	7^{8}	6^{2}	3
LL	(Serbia) M Zekić	4	4
Alt	(Argentina) TA Tirante	6	6
Q	(Serbia) N Milojević	6	5	6
WC	(Peru) N Álvarez	3	7	1
(Netherlands) J de Jong	3	6^{6}
3	(Italy) M Cecchinato	6	7^{8}
5	(Peru) JP Varillas	3	4
(Austria) G Melzer	6	6
(Brazil) F Meligeni Alves	6	6
(Argentina) F Comesaña	2	0
Q	(Brazil) T Seyboth Wild	1	6^{1}
Q	(Argentina) GA Olivieri	6	7^{7}
Q	(United Kingdom) J Choinski	4	2
2	(Argentina) TM Etcheverry	6	6

Second round
LL	(Argentina) RA Burruchaga	3	6	6
Alt	(Argentina) TA Tirante	6	2	4
Q	(Serbia) N Milojević	2	6	6
3	(Italy) M Cecchinato	6	4	4
(Austria) G Melzer	3	1
(Brazil) F Meligeni Alves	6	6
Q	(Argentina) GA Olivieri	3	6	1
2	(Argentina) TM Etcheverry	6	4	6

Quarterfinals
LL	(Argentina) RA Burruchaga	7^{7}	2	6
Q	(Serbia) N Milojević	6^{3}	6	4
(Brazil) F Meligeni Alves	5	2
2	(Argentina) TM Etcheverry	7	6

Semifinals
LL	(Argentina) RA Burruchaga	2	6	3
2	(Argentina) TM Etcheverry	6	3	6
