= 2022 Lima Challenger II – Doubles =

Doubles
- 2022 Lima Challenger II

Final
- Champions: (Netherlands) Jesper de Jong (Netherlands) Max Houkes
- Runners-up: (Argentina) Guido Andreozzi (Argentina) Guillermo Durán
- Score: 7–6^{(8–6)}, 3–6, [12–10]

Events
| Singles | Doubles |
- Lima Challenger

Ignacio Carou and Facundo Mena were the defending champions but chose not to defend their title.

Jesper de Jong and Max Houkes won the title after defeating Guido Andreozzi and Guillermo Durán 7–6^{(8–6)}, 3–6, [12–10] in the final.

== Seeds ==
1. (India) Sriram Balaji / (India) Jeevan Nedunchezhiyan (semifinals)
2. (Argentina) Guido Andreozzi / (Argentina) Guillermo Durán (final)
3. (Argentina) Facundo Díaz Acosta / (Venezuela) Luis David Martínez (withdrew)
4. (Bolivia) Boris Arias / (Bolivia) Federico Zeballos (quarterfinals)
5. (Argentina) Hernán Casanova / (Argentina) Santiago Rodríguez Taverna (first round)

== Draw ==
Key

- Q = Qualifier
- WC = Wild card
- LL = Lucky loser
- Alt = Alternate
- ITF = ITF entry
- PR = Protected ranking
- SR = Special ranking
- SE = Special exempt
- JE = Junior exempt
- JR = Junior Accelerator Programme entrant
- CO = College Accelerator Programme entrant
- NG = Next Gen Accelerator Program entrant
- w/o = Walkover
- r = Retired
- d = Defaulted

First round
1 | (India) S Balaji (India) J Nedunchezhiyan | 7 | 4 | [11]
(United Kingdom) J Choinski (Poland) K Drzewiecki | 5 | 6 | [9]
(Argentina) Juan Ignaco Galarza (Argentina) C Ugo Carabelli
(Serbia) N Milojević (Serbia) M Zekić | w/o
5 | (Argentina) H Casanova (Argentina) S Rodríguez Taverna | 3 | 4
(Netherlands) J de Jong (Netherlands) M Houkes | 6 | 6
(Poland) P Matuszewski (Peru) A Merino | 4 | 1
(Argentina) RA Burruchaga (Argentina) F Comesaña | 6 | 6
WC | (Peru) D Beretta (Peru) S Galdós | 2 | 6^{2}
WC | (Peru) G Bueno (Peru) I Buse | 6 | 7^{7}
(Peru) A Huertas del Pino (Peru) J Panta | 4 | 7^{9} | [5]
(Brazil) D Dutra da Silva (Brazil) T Seyboth Wild | 6 | 6^{7} | [10]
(Argentina) F Coria (Argentina) T Lipovšek Puches | 2 | 3
2 | (Argentina) G Andreozzi (Argentina) G Durán | 6 | 6

Quarterfinals
1 | (India) S Balaji (India) J Nedunchezhiyan | 6 | 6
(Serbia) N Milojević (Serbia) M Zekić | 4 | 2
(Netherlands) J de Jong (Netherlands) M Houkes | 7^{12} | 6
(Argentina) RA Burruchaga (Argentina) F Comesaña | 6^{10} | 3
WC | (Peru) G Bueno (Peru) I Buse | 6 | 7^{7}
4 | (Bolivia) B Arias (Bolivia) F Zeballos | 4 | 6^{2}
(Brazil) D Dutra da Silva (Brazil) T Seyboth Wild | 2 | 3
2 | (Argentina) G Andreozzi (Argentina) G Durán | 6 | 6

Semifinals
1 | (India) S Balaji (India) J Nedunchezhiyan | 2 | 6 | [13]
(Netherlands) J de Jong (Netherlands) M Houkes | 6 | 4 | [15]
WC | (Peru) G Bueno (Peru) I Buse | 3 | 5
2 | (Argentina) G Andreozzi (Argentina) G Durán | 6 | 7

Final
(Netherlands) J de Jong (Netherlands) M Houkes | 7^{8} | 3 | [12]
2 | (Argentina) G Andreozzi (Argentina) G Durán | 6^{6} | 6 | [10]
