= 2023 Lima Challenger – Singles =

Singles
- 2023 Lima Challenger

Final
- Champion: (Ecuador) Álvaro Guillén Meza
- Runner-up: (Jamaica) Blaise Bicknell
- Score: 7–6(7–3), 6–1

Events
Singles	Doubles
- Lima Challenger

Daniel Altmaier was the defending champion but chose not to defend his title.

Álvaro Guillén Meza won the title by defeating Blaise Bicknell 7–6(7–3), 6–1 in the final.

== Seeds ==
1. (Argentina) Juan Pablo Ficovich (second round)
2. (Argentina) Renzo Olivo (semifinals)
3. (Brazil) João Lucas Reis da Silva (second round)
4. (Bolivia) Murkel Dellien (semifinals)
5. (Brazil) Gustavo Heide (second round)
6. (Chile) Gonzalo Lama (quarterfinals)
7. (Brazil) Daniel Dutra da Silva (first round)
8. (Peru) Gonzalo Bueno (quarterfinals)

== Draw ==
Key

- Q = Qualifier
- WC = Wild card
- LL = Lucky loser
- Alt = Alternate
- ITF = ITF entry
- PR = Protected ranking
- SR = Special ranking
- SE = Special exempt
- JE = Junior exempt
- JR = Junior Accelerator Programme entrant
- CO = College Accelerator Programme entrant
- NG = Next Gen Accelerator Program entrant
- w/o = Walkover
- r = Retired
- d = Defaulted

=== Finals ===
Semifinals
(Jamaica) Blaise Bicknell	3	7^{8}	6
4	(Bolivia) Murkel Dellien	6	6^{6}	3
(Ecuador) Álvaro Guillén Meza	7	7
2	(Argentina) Renzo Olivo	5	5

Final
(Jamaica) Blaise Bicknell	6^{3}	1
(Ecuador) Álvaro Guillén Meza	7^{7}	6

=== Top half ===
First round
1	(Argentina) JP Ficovich	6	7^{7}
(Argentina) Tomás Farjat	1	6^{1}
(Jamaica) B Bicknell	6	6
Q	(United States) V Lilov	2	4
(Paraguay) AD Vallejo	6	6
(Brazil) P Boscardin Dias	2	4
Q	(Peru) I Buse	3	6	6
7	(Brazil) D Dutra da Silva	6	3	2
4	(Bolivia) M Dellien	6	2	6
(Brazil) M Alves	1	6	0
Q	(Argentina) GI Justo	4	6^{5}
Q	(Brazil) P Sakamoto	6	7^{7}
(Argentina) Juan Bautista Otegui	6	6
Q	(Argentina) MF Descotte	3	4
(Peru) J Panta	7^{7}	4	5
6	(Chile) G Lama	6^{4}	6	7

Second round
1	(Argentina) JP Ficovich	5	6	3
(Jamaica) B Bicknell	7	4	6
(Paraguay) AD Vallejo	5	6^{4}
Q	(Peru) I Buse	7	7^{7}
4	(Bolivia) M Dellien	5	6	6
Q	(Brazil) P Sakamoto	7	0	0
(Argentina) JB Otegui	6^{8}	4
6	(Chile) G Lama	7^{10}	6

Quarterfinals
(Jamaica) B Bicknell	3	7^{7}	6
Q	(Peru) I Buse	6	6^{2}	4
4	(Bolivia) M Dellien	6	7^{8}
6	(Chile) G Lama	2	6^{6}

Semifinals
(Jamaica) B Bicknell	3	7^{8}	6
4	(Bolivia) M Dellien	6	6^{6}	3

=== Bottom half ===
First round
5	(Brazil) G Heide	6	6^{3}	6
(Argentina) Ignacio Monzón	0	7^{7}	1
(Ecuador) Á Guillén Meza	6	6
(Argentina) V Aboian	1	2
WC	(Peru) A Huertas del Pino	6	1	6
(United States) B Kuzuhara	4	6	3
(Brazil) Wilson Leite	1	3
3	(Brazil) JL Reis da Silva	6	6
8	(Peru) G Bueno	6	6
WC	(United States) Milledge Cossu	2	3
(Ecuador) A Andrade	6	6
(Argentina) Leonardo Aboian	3	4
(Argentina) G Villanueva	6	1	7
Q	(Bolivia) JC Prado Ángelo	3	6	5
WC	(Peru) C Huertas del Pino	6	5	5
2	(Argentina) R Olivo	3	7	7

Second round
5	(Brazil) G Heide	2	6	6^{4}
(Ecuador) Á Guillén Meza	6	2	7^{7}
WC	(Peru) A Huertas del Pino	7	2	6
3	(Brazil) JL Reis da Silva	5	6	2
8	(Peru) G Bueno	6	6
(Ecuador) A Andrade	3	2
(Argentina) G Villanueva	6	3	4
2	(Argentina) R Olivo	0	6	6

Quarterfinals
(Ecuador) Á Guillén Meza	6	5	6
WC	(Peru) A Huertas del Pino	2	7	4
8	(Peru) G Bueno	6	3	3
2	(Argentina) R Olivo	4	6	6

Semifinals
(Ecuador) Á Guillén Meza	7	7
2	(Argentina) R Olivo	5	5
