= 2025 Copa Sevilla – Doubles =

Doubles
- 2025 Copa Sevilla

Final
- Champions: (Czech Republic) Jonáš Forejtek (Czech Republic) Dominik Kellovský
- Runners-up: (Spain) Mario Mansilla Díez (Spain) Bruno Pujol Navarro
- Score: 2–6, 6–3, [10–5]

Events
Singles	Doubles
- Copa Sevilla

Petr Nouza and Patrik Rikl were the defending champions but chose not to defend their title.

Jonáš Forejtek and Dominik Kellovský won the title after defeating Mario Mansilla Díez and Bruno Pujol Navarro 2–6, 6–3, [10–5] in the final.

== Seeds ==
1. (France) Théo Arribagé / (India) Arjun Kadhe (first round)
2. (Peru) Alexander Merino / (Germany) Christoph Negritu (quarterfinals)
3. Ivan Liutarevich / (Spain) David Vega Hernández (quarterfinals)
4. (Bolivia) Boris Arias / (Bolivia) Federico Zeballos (first round)

== Draw ==
Key

- Q = Qualifier
- WC = Wild card
- LL = Lucky loser
- Alt = Alternate
- ITF = ITF entry
- PR = Protected ranking
- SR = Special ranking
- SE = Special exempt
- JE = Junior exempt
- JR = Junior Accelerator Programme entrant
- CO = College Accelerator Programme entrant
- NG = Next Gen Accelerator Program entrant
- w/o = Walkover
- r = Retired
- d = Defaulted

=== Draw ===
First round
1	(France) T Arribagé (India) A Kadhe	6^{4}	6	[8]
(Poland) S Kielan (Poland) F Pieczonka	7^{7}	0	[10]
Alt	(Czech Republic) J Forejtek (Czech Republic) D Kellovský	6	6
(Spain) S Martos Gornés (Germany) T Rühl	3	3
4	(Bolivia) B Arias (Bolivia) F Zeballos	4	6^{4}
WC	(Spain) J Barranco Cosano (Spain) B Winter López	6	7^{7}
(Spain) Í Cervantes (Spain) D Rincón	6	6
(Portugal) F Ferreira Silva (Portugal) H Rocha	4	3
WC	(Spain) P Llamas Ruiz (Spain) Germán López Andújar	w/o
(Spain) C Sánchez Jover (Spain) C Taberner
(Spain) A Barroso Campos (Spain) I Montes de la Torre	4	6	[9]
3	I Liutarevich (Spain) D Vega Hernández	6	3	[11]
(Spain) M Mansilla Díez (Spain) B Pujol Navarro	6	6
(Spain) N Álvarez Varona (Spain) Iván Marrero Curbelo	4	0
(Serbia) I Sabanov (Serbia) M Sabanov	6	3	[9]
2	(Peru) A Merino (Germany) C Negritu	4	6	[11]

Quarterfinals
(Poland) S Kielan (Poland) F Pieczonka	6^{1}	5
Alt	(Czech Republic) J Forejtek (Czech Republic) D Kellovský	7^{7}	7
WC	(Spain) J Barranco Cosano (Spain) B Winter López	7^{7}	2	[7]
(Spain) Í Cervantes (Spain) D Rincón	6^{4}	6	[10]
WC	(Spain) P Llamas Ruiz (Spain) G López Andújar	2	6	[10]
3	I Liutarevich (Spain) D Vega Hernández	6	4	[6]
(Spain) M Mansilla Díez (Spain) B Pujol Navarro	7^{10}	6
2	(Peru) A Merino (Germany) C Negritu	6^{8}	2

Semifinals
Alt	(Czech Republic) J Forejtek (Czech Republic) D Kellovský	6	7^{7}
(Spain) Í Cervantes (Spain) D Rincón	3	6^{3}
WC	(Spain) P Llamas Ruiz (Spain) G López Andújar	5	4
(Spain) M Mansilla Díez (Spain) B Pujol Navarro	7	6

Final
Alt	(Czech Republic) J Forejtek (Czech Republic) D Kellovský	2	6	[10]
(Spain) M Mansilla Díez (Spain) B Pujol Navarro	6	3	[5]
