= 2026 Winston-Salem Open =

- Date: August 23–29
- Edition: 57th
- Category: ATP Tour 250 Series
- Draw: 48S / 16D
- Surface: Hard / outdoor
- Location: Winston-Salem, North Carolina, United States
- Venue: Wake Forest University

Champions

Singles
- (Peru) Ignacio Buse

Doubles
- (Czech Republic) Petr Nouza / (Austria) Neil Oberleitner
- Winston-Salem Open

The 2026 Winston-Salem Open was a men's tennis tournament played on outdoor hard courts. It was the 57th edition of the Winston-Salem Open (as successor to previous tournaments in New Haven and Long Island), and an ATP 250 tournament on the 2026 ATP Tour. It took place at Wake Forest University in Winston-Salem, North Carolina, United States, from August 23 to August 29, 2026.

== Champions ==
=== Singles ===
- (Peru) Ignacio Buse def. (United Kingdom) Arthur Fery, 6–3, 6–2

=== Doubles ===
- (Czech Republic) Petr Nouza / (Austria) Neil Oberleitner def. (United States) Austin Krajicek / (Croatia) Nikola Mektić, 7–5, 6–4

== Singles main draw entrants ==
=== Seeds ===
Country	Player	Rank^{†}	Seed
	Daniil Medvedev	7	1
ITA	Luciano Darderi	20	2
PER	Ignacio Buse	36	3
GBR	Arthur Fery	37	4
BEL	Raphaël Collignon	38	5
ARG	Mariano Navone	44	6
GRE	Stefanos Tsitsipas	49	7
ARG	Juan Manuel Cerúndolo	51	8
FRA	Adrian Mannarino	52	9
ARG	Sebastián Báez	53	10
FRA	Luca Van Assche	54	11
FRA	Quentin Halys	57	12
NED	Botic van de Zandschulp	59	13
CZE	Tomáš Macháč	62	14
HUN	Fábián Marozsán	63	15
GER	Daniel Altmaier	65	16

^{†} Rankings are as of August 10, 2026.

=== Other entrants ===
The following players received wildcards into the singles main draw:

- (United States) Darwin Blanch
- (United States) Martin Damm
- (Australia) Cruz Hewitt
- (Spain) Martín Landaluce

The following player received entry as a late entry:

- Daniil Medvedev

The following player received entry as an emergency substitute:

- (Greece) Stefanos Tsitsipas

The following player received entry as an alternate:

- (China) Wu Yibing

The following players received entry from the qualifying draw:

- (France) Felix Balshaw
- (Netherlands) Mees Röttgering
- (Jordan) Abdullah Shelbayh
- (United States) Quinn Vandecasteele

The following players received entry as lucky losers:

- (United States) Sebastian Gorzny
- (France) Hugo Grenier
- (France) Pierre-Hugues Herbert
- (India) Dhakshineswar Suresh

=== Withdrawals ===
- (France) Térence Atmane → replaced by (France) Hugo Grenier (LL)
- (Argentina) Román Andrés Burruchaga → replaced by (Netherlands) Jesper de Jong
- (Portugal) Jaime Faria → replaced by (Japan) Sho Shimabukuro
- (Germany) Yannick Hanfmann → replaced by (United Kingdom) Jan Choinski
- (Czech Republic) Vít Kopřiva → replaced by (France) Pierre-Hugues Herbert (LL)
- (Serbia) Hamad Medjedovic → replaced by (United States) Marcos Giron
- (Slovakia) Alex Molčan → replaced by (Australia) James Duckworth
- (France) Corentin Moutet → replaced by (Italy) Mattia Bellucci
- (Spain) Jaume Munar → replaced by (Croatia) Dino Prižmić
- (Croatia) Dino Prižmić → replaced by (United States) Sebastian Gorzny (LL)
- (United States) Ethan Quinn → replaced by (France) Giovanni Mpetshi Perricard
- (France) Arthur Rinderknech → replaced by (Australia) Rinky Hijikata
- (France) Valentin Royer → replaced by (India) Dhakshineswar Suresh (LL)
- (China) Shang Juncheng → replaced by (Argentina) Francisco Comesaña
- (Canada) Denis Shapovalov → replaced by Roman Safiullin
- (Chile) Alejandro Tabilo → replaced by (Greece) Stefanos Tsitsipas
- (Argentina) Thiago Agustín Tirante → replaced by (France) Benjamin Bonzi
- (Argentina) Camilo Ugo Carabelli → replaced by (China) Wu Yibing

== Doubles main draw entrants ==
=== Seeds ===
Country	Player	Country	Player	Rank^{†}	Seed
FRA	Théo Arribagé	FRA	Manuel Guinard	34	1
FRA	Sadio Doumbia	FRA	Fabien Reboul	47	2
AUT	Lucas Miedler	AUS	Marc Polmans	51	3
USA	Austin Krajicek	CRO	Nikola Mektić	57	4

^{†} Rankings are as of August 10, 2026.

=== Other entrants ===
The following pairs received wildcards into the doubles draw:

- (United States) Nathaniel Lammons / (United States) Jackson Withrow
- (Brazil) Marcelo Melo / (Australia) John-Patrick Smith
