= 2023 Lima Challenger – Doubles =

Doubles
- 2023 Lima Challenger

Final
- Champions: (Peru) Gonzalo Bueno (Paraguay) Daniel Vallejo
- Runners-up: (Peru) Ignacio Buse (Peru) Jorge Panta
- Score: 6–4, 6–2

Events
| Singles | Doubles |
| ← 2022 · | Lima Challenger | · 2023 → |

Jesper de Jong and Max Houkes were the defending champions but chose not to defend their title.

Gonzalo Bueno and Daniel Vallejo won the title after defeating Ignacio Buse and Jorge Panta 6–4, 6–2 in the final.

== Seeds ==
1. (Peru) Arklon Huertas del Pino / (Peru) Conner Huertas del Pino (quarterfinals)
2. (Brazil) Pedro Boscardin Dias / (Brazil) João Lucas Reis da Silva (quarterfinals)
3. (Uruguay) Ignacio Carou / (Argentina) Ignacio Monzón (quarterfinals)
4. (Brazil) Daniel Dutra da Silva / (Brazil) Pedro Sakamoto (quarterfinals)

== Draw ==
=== Key ===
- Q = Qualifier
- WC = Wild card
- LL = Lucky loser
- Alt = Alternate
- ITF = ITF entry
- PR = Protected ranking
- SR = Special ranking
- SE = Special exempt
- JE = Junior exempt
- JR = Junior Accelerator Programme entrant
- CO = College Accelerator Programme entrant
- NG = Next Gen Accelerator Program entrant
- w/o = Walkover
- r = Retired
- d = Defaulted

First round
1 | (Peru) A Huertas del Pino (Peru) C Huertas del Pino | 6 | 6
(Argentina) Juan Bautista Otegui (Argentina) G Villanueva | 1 | 1
(Argentina) Leonardo Aboian (Argentina) Tomás Farjat | 1 | 2
(Peru) G Bueno (Paraguay) AD Vallejo | 6 | 6
PR | (Colombia) JS Gómez (Colombia) A Urrea | 6 | 6
WC | (United States) Milledge Cossu (The Bahamas) J Roberts | 3 | 2
(Peru) I Buse (Peru) J Panta | 2 | 6 | [10]
(Ecuador) A Andrade (Dominican Republic) R Cid Subervi | 6 | 3 | [7]
WC | (Peru) Alberto Odiseo Alvarado Berrospi (Peru) Gianluca Ballotta | 2 | 3
4 | (Brazil) D Dutra da Silva (Brazil) P Sakamoto | 6 | 6
(Argentina) MF Descotte (Chile) M Soto | 3 | 7 | [7]
(United States) T Hilderbrand (United States) N Schachter | 6 | 5 | [10]
(Argentina) V Aboian (Brazil) M Alves | 2 | 4
2 | (Brazil) P Boscardin Dias (Brazil) JL Reis da Silva | 6 | 6

Quarterfinals
1 | (Peru) A Huertas del Pino (Peru) C Huertas del Pino | 6 | 4 | [12]
(Peru) G Bueno (Paraguay) AD Vallejo | 0 | 6 | [14]
3 | (Uruguay) I Carou (Argentina) Ignacio Monzón | 4 | 4
PR | (Colombia) JS Gómez (Colombia) A Urrea | 6 | 6
(Peru) I Buse (Peru) J Panta | 6 | 6
4 | (Brazil) D Dutra da Silva (Brazil) P Sakamoto | 3 | 3
(United States) T Hilderbrand (United States) N Schachter | 4 | 7^{7} | [11]
2 | (Brazil) P Boscardin Dias (Brazil) JL Reis da Silva | 6 | 6^{1} | [9]

Semifinals
(Peru) G Bueno (Paraguay) AD Vallejo | 2 | 7^{7} | [12]
PR | (Colombia) JS Gómez (Colombia) A Urrea | 6 | 6^{5} | [10]
(Peru) I Buse (Peru) J Panta | 3 | 6 | [11]
(United States) T Hilderbrand (United States) N Schachter | 6 | 2 | [9]

Final
(Peru) G Bueno (Paraguay) AD Vallejo | 6 | 6
(Peru) I Buse (Peru) J Panta | 4 | 2
