= 2025 Uruguay Open – Singles =

Singles
- 2025 Uruguay Open

Final
- Champion: (Chile) Cristian Garín
- Runner-up: (Peru) Ignacio Buse
- Score: 6–7^{(3–7)}, 6–2, 6–2

Events
Singles	Doubles
- Uruguay Open

Tristan Boyer was the defending champion but lost in the first round to Alex Barrena.

Cristian Garín won the title after defeating Ignacio Buse 6–7^{(3–7)}, 6–2, 6–2 in the final.

== Seeds ==
1. (Argentina) Sebastián Báez (first round)
2. (Argentina) Mariano Navone (quarterfinals)
3. (United States) Emilio Nava (second round)
4. (Spain) Carlos Taberner (quarterfinals)
5. (Chile) Cristian Garín (champion)
6. (Argentina) Román Andrés Burruchaga (semifinals)
7. (Peru) Ignacio Buse (final)
8. (Chile) Tomás Barrios Vera (semifinals)

== Draw ==
Key

- Q = Qualifier
- WC = Wild card
- LL = Lucky loser
- Alt = Alternate
- ITF = ITF entry
- PR = Protected ranking
- SR = Special ranking
- SE = Special exempt
- JE = Junior exempt
- JR = Junior Accelerator Programme entrant
- CO = College Accelerator Programme entrant
- NG = Next Gen Accelerator Program entrant
- w/o = Walkover
- r = Retired
- d = Defaulted

=== Finals ===
Semifinals
5	(Chile) Cristian Garín	4	6	6
8	(Chile) Tomás Barrios Vera	6	4	1
7	(Peru) Ignacio Buse	6	7
6	(Argentina) Román Andrés Burruchaga	2	5

Final
5	(Chile) Cristian Garín	6^{3}	6	6
7	(Peru) Ignacio Buse	7^{7}	2	2

=== Top half ===
First round
1/WC	(Argentina) S Báez	6^{3}	4
(Ecuador) Á Guillén Meza	7^{7}	6
Q	(Argentina) GI Justo	6	2	3
(Paraguay) AD Vallejo	4	6	6
(Argentina) A Barrena	6^{1}	7	6
(United States) T Boyer	7^{7}	5	1
Q	(Argentina) A Collarini	3	5
5	(Chile) C Garín	6	7
4	(Spain) C Taberner	6	6
(Peru) G Bueno	0	2
(Czech Republic) Z Kolář	6	6
Q	(Uruguay) J Aguilar Cardozo	1	1
WC	(Uruguay) F Roncadelli	6	6
(Argentina) GA Olivieri	2	4
NG	(Bolivia) JC Prado Ángelo	4	1
8	(Chile) T Barrios Vera	6	6

Second round
(Ecuador) Á Guillén Meza	6	3	4
(Paraguay) AD Vallejo	2	6	6
(Argentina) A Barrena	2	4
5	(Chile) C Garín	6	6
4	(Spain) C Taberner	7^{7}	6
(Czech Republic) Z Kolář	6^{2}	3
WC	(Uruguay) F Roncadelli	3	3
8	(Chile) T Barrios Vera	6	6

Quarterfinals
(Paraguay) AD Vallejo	6	2	3
5	(Chile) C Garín	2	6	6
4	(Spain) C Taberner	2	6	6^{4}
8	(Chile) T Barrios Vera	6	2	7^{7}

Semifinals
5	(Chile) C Garín	4	6	6
8	(Chile) T Barrios Vera	6	4	1

=== Bottom half ===
First round
7	(Peru) I Buse	6	6
(Kazakhstan) T Skatov	3	1
Q	(Spain) D Jordà Sanchis	3	6	4
(Lithuania) V Gaubas	6	3	6
PR	(Brazil) G Heide	6	6
(Mexico) R Pacheco Méndez	3	4
Q	(Brazil) D Dutra da Silva	2	4
3	(United States) E Nava	6	6
6	(Argentina) RA Burruchaga	7^{8}	5	6
(Argentina) FA Gómez	6^{6}	7	4
(Brazil) JL Reis da Silva	6	1	2
Q	(Argentina) F Mena	3	6	6
WC	(Italy) M Cecchinato	6	7
(Argentina) F Díaz Acosta	4	5
Alt	(Argentina) S Rodríguez Taverna	3	2
2	(Argentina) M Navone	6	6

Second round
7	(Peru) I Buse	6	2	7^{7}
(Lithuania) V Gaubas	2	6	6^{3}
PR	(Brazil) G Heide	4	7	6
3	(United States) E Nava	6	5	4
6	(Argentina) RA Burruchaga	7	6
Q	(Argentina) F Mena	5	4
WC	(Italy) M Cecchinato	6	0	4
2	(Argentina) M Navone	3	6	6

Quarterfinals
7	(Peru) I Buse	6	6
PR	(Brazil) G Heide	1	4
6	(Argentina) RA Burruchaga	6	6
2	(Argentina) M Navone	4	4

Semifinals
7	(Peru) I Buse	6	7
6	(Argentina) RA Burruchaga	2	5
