= 2026 Winston-Salem Open – Doubles =

Doubles
- 2026 Winston-Salem Open

Final
- Champions: (Czech Republic) Petr Nouza (Austria) Neil Oberleitner
- Runners-up: (United States) Austin Krajicek (Croatia) Nikola Mektić
- Score: 7–5, 6–4

Events
Singles	Doubles
- Winston-Salem Open

Petr Nouza and Neil Oberleitner defeated Austin Krajicek and Nikola Mektić in the final, 7–5, 6–4 to win the doubles tennis title at the 2026 Winston-Salem Open.

Rafael Matos and Marcelo Melo were the reigning champions, but Matos did not participate this year. Melo partnered John-Patrick Smith, but lost in the first round to Robert Galloway and André Göransson.

== Seeds ==
1. (France) Théo Arribagé / (France) Manuel Guinard (semifinals)
2. (France) Sadio Doumbia / (France) Fabien Reboul (first round)
3. (Austria) Lucas Miedler / (Australia) Marc Polmans (semifinals)
4. (United States) Austin Krajicek / (Croatia) Nikola Mektić (final)

== Draw ==
Key

- Q = Qualifier
- WC = Wild card
- LL = Lucky loser
- Alt = Alternate
- ITF = ITF entry
- PR = Protected ranking
- SR = Special ranking
- SE = Special exempt
- JE = Junior exempt
- JR = Junior Accelerator Programme entrant
- CO = College Accelerator Programme entrant
- NG = Next Gen Accelerator Program entrant
- w/o = Walkover
- r = Retired
- d = Defaulted

=== Draw ===
First round
1	(France) T Arribagé (France) M Guinard	4	6	[10]
(United States) R Cash (Austria) A Erler	6	3	[8]
(Germany) J Schnaitter (Germany) M Wallner	6^{6}	6	[10]
WC	(United States) N Lammons (United States) J Withrow	7^{8}	3	[8]
4	(United States) A Krajicek (Croatia) N Mektić	7^{7}	7
(Portugal) F Cabral (United States) JJ Tracy	6^{0}	5
(United States) R Galloway (Sweden) A Göransson	6	6^{7}	[10]
WC	(Brazil) M Melo (Australia) J-P Smith	4	7^{9}	[7]
(Germany) C Frantzen (Netherlands) R Haase	6	6
(France) Q Halys (France) P-H Herbert	4	2
(United Kingdom) L Johnson (Poland) J Zieliński	6	3	[7]
3	(Austria) L Miedler (Australia) M Polmans	4	6	[10]
(India) Y Bhambri (New Zealand) M Venus	6	6^{4}	[6]
(Czech Republic) P Nouza (Austria) N Oberleitner	3	7^{7}	[10]
(United States) R Ram (United Kingdom) J Salisbury	6	7^{11}
2	(France) S Doumbia (France) F Reboul	4	6^{9}

Quarterfinals
1	(France) T Arribagé (France) M Guinard	7^{12}	6
(Germany) J Schnaitter (Germany) M Wallner	6^{10}	2
4	(United States) A Krajicek (Croatia) N Mektić	6	2	[10]
(United States) R Galloway (Sweden) A Göransson	3	6	[4]
(Germany) C Frantzen (Netherlands) R Haase	3	6	[7]
3	(Austria) L Miedler (Australia) M Polmans	6	4	[10]
(Czech Republic) P Nouza (Austria) N Oberleitner	6	7^{7}
(United States) R Ram (United Kingdom) J Salisbury	2	6^{4}

Semifinals
1	(France) T Arribagé (France) M Guinard	6	3	[4]
4	(United States) A Krajicek (Croatia) N Mektić	4	6	[10]
3	(Austria) L Miedler (Australia) M Polmans	4	2
(Czech Republic) P Nouza (Austria) N Oberleitner	6	6

Final
4	(United States) A Krajicek (Croatia) N Mektić	5	4
(Czech Republic) P Nouza (Austria) N Oberleitner	7	6
