= 2025 Copa Sevilla =

- Date: 1–6 September
- Edition: 27th
- Surface: Clay
- Location: Seville, Spain

Champions

Singles
- (Peru) Ignacio Buse

Doubles
- (Czech Republic) Jonáš Forejtek / (Czech Republic) Dominik Kellovský
- Copa Sevilla

The 2025 Copa Sevilla was a professional tennis tournament played on clay courts. It was the 27th edition of the tournament which was part of the 2025 ATP Challenger Tour. It took place in Seville, Spain between 1 and 6 September 2025.

== Singles main-draw entrants ==
=== Seeds ===
Country	Player	Rank^{1}	Seed
ESP	Roberto Carballés Baena	87	1
ESP	Carlos Taberner	99	2
POR	Jaime Faria	117	3
SRB	Dušan Lajović	128	4
CHI	Tomás Barrios Vera	134	5
PER	Ignacio Buse	135	6
ESP	Pablo Carreño Busta	137	7
LTU	Vilius Gaubas	160	8

- ^{1} Rankings are as of 25 August 2025.

=== Other entrants ===
The following players received wildcards into the singles main draw:

- (Spain) Javier Barranco Cosano
- (Spain) Pablo Llamas Ruiz
- (Spain) Bernabé Zapata Miralles

The following players received entry into the singles main draw as alternates:

- (Italy) Lorenzo Giustino
- (Spain) Daniel Rincón

The following players received entry from the qualifying draw:

- (Czech Republic) Jonáš Forejtek
- (Spain) David Jordà Sanchis
- (Czech Republic) Dominik Kellovský
- (Spain) Carlos López Montagud
- (Spain) Àlex Martínez
- (Latvia) Robert Strombachs

== Champions ==
=== Singles ===
- (Peru) Ignacio Buse def. (Argentina) Genaro Alberto Olivieri 6–3, 3–6, 6–3.

=== Doubles ===
- (Czech Republic) Jonáš Forejtek / (Czech Republic) Dominik Kellovský def. (Spain) Mario Mansilla Díez / (Spain) Bruno Pujol Navarro 2–6, 6–3, [10–5].
