= 2025 Uruguay Open =

- Date: 10–16 November
- Edition: 20th
- Surface: Clay
- Location: Montevideo, Uruguay
- Venue: Carrasco Lawn Tennis Club

Champions

Singles
- (Chile) Cristian Garín

Doubles
- (Argentina) Facundo Mena / (Mexico) Rodrigo Pacheco Méndez
- Uruguay Open

The 2025 Uruguay Open was a professional tennis tournament played on red clay courts in Montevideo. It was the 20th edition of the tournament which was part of the 2025 ATP Challenger Tour. It took place at the Carrasco Lawn Tennis Club in Montevideo, Uruguay between 10 and 16 November 2025.

== Singles main-draw entrants ==
=== Seeds ===
Country	Player	Rank^{1}	Seed
ARG	Sebastián Báez	45	1
ARG	Mariano Navone	74	2
USA	Emilio Nava	90	3
ESP	Carlos Taberner	103	4
CHI	Cristian Garín	104	5
ARG	Román Andrés Burruchaga	105	6
PER	Ignacio Buse	109	7
CHI	Tomás Barrios Vera	122	8

- ^{1} Rankings are as of 3 November 2025.

=== Other entrants ===
The following players received wildcards into the singles main draw:

- (Argentina) Sebastián Báez
- (Italy) Marco Cecchinato
- (Uruguay) Franco Roncadelli

The following player received entry into the singles main draw using a protected ranking:

- (Brazil) Gustavo Heide

The following player received entry into the singles main draw through the Next Gen Accelerator programme:

- (Bolivia) Juan Carlos Prado Ángelo

The following player received entry into the singles main draw as an alternate:

- (Argentina) Santiago Rodríguez Taverna

The following players received entry from the qualifying draw:

- (Uruguay) Joaquín Aguilar Cardozo
- (Argentina) Andrea Collarini
- (Brazil) Daniel Dutra da Silva
- (Spain) David Jordà Sanchis
- (Argentina) Guido Iván Justo
- (Argentina) Facundo Mena

== Champions ==
=== Singles ===
- (Chile) Cristian Garín def. (Peru) Ignacio Buse 6–7^{(3–7)}, 6–2, 6–2.

=== Doubles ===
- (Argentina) Facundo Mena / (Mexico) Rodrigo Pacheco Méndez def. (Ecuador) Gonzalo Escobar / (Mexico) Miguel Ángel Reyes-Varela 3–6, 6–3, [11–9].
