= 2025 Uruguay Open – Doubles =

Doubles
- 2025 Uruguay Open

Final
- Champions: (Argentina) Facundo Mena (Mexico) Rodrigo Pacheco Méndez
- Runners-up: (Ecuador) Gonzalo Escobar (Mexico) Miguel Ángel Reyes-Varela
- Score: 3–6, 6–3, [11–9]

Events
Singles	Doubles
- Uruguay Open

Guido Andreozzi and Orlando Luz were the defending champions but only Andreozzi chose to defend his title, partnering Benjamin Kittay. They lost in the quarterfinals to Gonzalo Escobar and Miguel Ángel Reyes-Varela.

Facundo Mena and Rodrigo Pacheco Méndez won the title after defeating Escobar and Reyes-Varela 3–6, 6–3, [11–9] in the final.

== Seeds ==
1. (Ecuador) Gonzalo Escobar / (Mexico) Miguel Ángel Reyes-Varela (final)
2. (Colombia) Nicolás Barrientos / (Brazil) Marcelo Demoliner (quarterfinals)
3. (Poland) Karol Drzewiecki / (Poland) Piotr Matuszewski (quarterfinals)
4. (Argentina) Federico Agustín Gómez / (Venezuela) Luis David Martínez (first round)

== Draw ==
Key

- Q = Qualifier
- WC = Wild card
- LL = Lucky loser
- Alt = Alternate
- ITF = ITF entry
- PR = Protected ranking
- SR = Special ranking
- SE = Special exempt
- JE = Junior exempt
- JR = Junior Accelerator Programme entrant
- CO = College Accelerator Programme entrant
- NG = Next Gen Accelerator Program entrant
- w/o = Walkover
- r = Retired
- d = Defaulted

First round
1	(Ecuador) G Escobar (Mexico) M Reyes-Varela	3	6	[10]
(Argentina) A Collarini (Czech Republic) Z Kolář	6	1	[6]
(Bolivia) B Arias (Denmark) J Ingildsen	4	3
(Argentina) G Andreozzi (United States) B Kittay	6	6
4	(Argentina) FA Gómez (Venezuela) LD Martínez	3	4
(Brazil) D Dutra da Silva (Argentina) G Villanueva	6	6
WC	(Uruguay) I Carou (Uruguay) F Roncadelli	4	4
(Peru) A Merino (Germany) C Negritu	6	6
(Colombia) C Rodríguez (Bolivia) F Zeballos	6	7
Alt	(Argentina) S de la Fuente (Argentina) GA Olivieri	3	5
Alt	(Brazil) G Heide (Brazil) Bruno Oliveira	4	4
3	(Poland) K Drzewiecki (Poland) P Matuszewski	6	6
WC	(Uruguay) Federico Aguilar Cardozo (Uruguay) J Aguilar Cardozo	6^{6}	6	[3]
(Argentina) F Mena (Mexico) R Pacheco Méndez	7^{8}	3	[10]
(Argentina) G Durán (Argentina) M Kestelboim	1	6^{8}
2	(Colombia) N Barrientos (Brazil) M Demoliner	6	7^{10}

Quarterfinals
1	(Ecuador) G Escobar (Mexico) M Reyes-Varela	6	6
(Argentina) G Andreozzi (United States) B Kittay	4	4
(Brazil) D Dutra da Silva (Argentina) G Villanueva	0	6^{5}
(Peru) A Merino (Germany) C Negritu	6	7^{7}
(Colombia) C Rodríguez (Bolivia) F Zeballos	6^{6}	6	[10]
3	(Poland) K Drzewiecki (Poland) P Matuszewski	7^{8}	3	[8]
(Argentina) F Mena (Mexico) R Pacheco Méndez	6	6
2	(Colombia) N Barrientos (Brazil) M Demoliner	4	4

Semifinals
1	(Ecuador) G Escobar (Mexico) M Reyes-Varela	6	6
(Peru) A Merino (Germany) C Negritu	4	2
(Colombia) C Rodríguez (Bolivia) F Zeballos	7^{7}	6^{1}	[11]
(Argentina) F Mena (Mexico) R Pacheco Méndez	6^{5}	7^{7}	[13]

Final
1	(Ecuador) G Escobar (Mexico) M Reyes-Varela	6	3	[9]
(Argentina) F Mena (Mexico) R Pacheco Méndez	3	6	[11]
