= 2026 Winston-Salem Open – Singles =

Singles
- 2026 Winston-Salem Open

Final
- Champion: (Peru) Ignacio Buse
- Runner-up: (United Kingdom) Arthur Fery
- Score: 6–3, 6–2

Details
- Draw: 48 (4Q / 4WC)
- Seeds: 16

Events
Singles	Doubles
- Winston-Salem Open

Ignacio Buse defeated Arthur Fery in the final, 6–3, 6–2 to win the singles tennis title at the 2026 Winston-Salem Open. It was his second ATP Tour title, and first on hard courts. Buse was the youngest champion in tournament history, and the second Peruvian man to win a tour-level singles title on hardcourt, after Jaime Yzaga in 1993.

Márton Fucsovics was the reigning champion, but withdrew due to a shoulder injury.

== Seeds ==
All seeds received a bye into the second round.

1. Daniil Medvedev (second round)
2. (Italy) Luciano Darderi (third round)
3. (Peru) Ignacio Buse (champion)
4. (United Kingdom) Arthur Fery (final)
5. (Belgium) Raphaël Collignon (second round)
6. (Argentina) Mariano Navone (second round)
7. (Greece) Stefanos Tsitsipas (third round)
8. (Argentina) Juan Manuel Cerúndolo (quarterfinals)
9. (France) Adrian Mannarino (second round)
10. (Argentina) Sebastián Báez (third round, retired)
11. (France) Luca Van Assche (second round)
12. (France) Quentin Halys (second round)
13. (Netherlands) Botic van de Zandschulp (quarterfinals)
14. (Czech Republic) Tomáš Macháč (second round)
15. (Hungary) Fábián Marozsán (quarterfinals)
16. (Germany) Daniel Altmaier (third round)

Click on the seed number of a player to go to their draw section.

== Draw ==
Key

- Q = Qualifier
- WC = Wild card
- LL = Lucky loser
- Alt = Alternate
- ITF = ITF entry
- PR = Protected ranking
- SR = Special ranking
- SE = Special exempt
- JE = Junior exempt
- JR = Junior Accelerator Programme entrant
- CO = College Accelerator Programme entrant
- NG = Next Gen Accelerator Program entrant
- w/o = Walkover
- r = Retired
- d = Defaulted

=== Finals ===
Quarterfinals
15	(Hungary) Fábián Marozsán	7^{7}	2	4
(Australia) James Duckworth	6^{4}	6	6
4	(United Kingdom) Arthur Fery	3	7	6
(United States) Aleksandar Kovacevic	6	5	3
8	(Argentina) Juan Manuel Cerúndolo	6^{4}	6	2
3	(Peru) Ignacio Buse	7^{7}	4	6
(France) Benjamin Bonzi	7^{7}	6
13	(Netherlands) Botic van de Zandschulp	6^{5}	4

Semifinals
(Australia) James Duckworth	4	2^{r}
4	(United Kingdom) Arthur Fery	6	1
3	(Peru) Ignacio Buse	6	4	6
(France) Benjamin Bonzi	2	6	1

Final
4	(United Kingdom) Arthur Fery	3	2
3	(Peru) Ignacio Buse	6	6

=== Top half ===
==== Section 1 ====
First round
WC	(United States) M Damm	6	7^{7}
Q	(Jordan) A Shelbayh	4	6^{2}
(Japan) S Shimabukuro	4	3
(Serbia) M Kecmanović	6	6
(Italy) L Sonego	7^{7}	4	6
LL	(France) P-H Herbert	6^{4}	6	3
Q	(United States) Q Vandecasteele	2	1
(Australia) J Duckworth	6	6

Second round
1	D Medvedev	5	3
WC	(United States) M Damm	7	6
(Serbia) M Kecmanović	3	4
15	(Hungary) F Marozsán	6	6
9	(France) A Mannarino	1	6^{5}
(Italy) L Sonego	6	7^{7}
(Australia) J Duckworth	6	7^{7}
6	(Argentina) M Navone	3	6^{5}

Third round
WC	(United States) M Damm	6	3	3
15	(Hungary) F Marozsán	2	6	6
(Italy) L Sonego	5	3
(Australia) J Duckworth	7	6

Quarterfinals
15	(Hungary) F Marozsán	7^{7}	2	4
(Australia) J Duckworth	6^{4}	6	6

==== Section 2 ====
First round
LL	(United States) S Gorzny	6	6^{3}	4
WC	(Australia) C Hewitt	1	7^{7}	6
(United Kingdom) J Choinski	5	6	4
Q	(Netherlands) M Röttgering	7	2	6
Q	(France) F Balshaw	4	6^{4}
(United States) A Kovacevic	6	7^{7}
(France) G Mpetshi Perricard	3	2
(United States) J Brooksby	6	6

Second round
4	(United Kingdom) A Fery	6	7
WC	(Australia) C Hewitt	1	5
Q	(Netherlands) M Röttgering	6	7^{7}
14	(Czech Republic) T Macháč	2	6^{1}
11	(France) L Van Assche	1	6^{6}
(United States) A Kovacevic	6	7^{8}
(United States) J Brooksby	4	6^{6}
7	(Greece) S Tsitsipas	6	7^{8}

Third round
4	(United Kingdom) A Fery	6	6
Q	(Netherlands) M Röttgering	3	3
(United States) A Kovacevic	6	7^{7}
7	(Greece) S Tsitsipas	3	6^{1}

Quarterfinals
4	(United Kingdom) A Fery	3	7	6
(United States) A Kovacevic	6	5	3

=== Bottom half ===
==== Section 3 ====
First round
LL	(India) D Suresh	6	7
(United States) M Giron	3	5
R Safiullin	6^{6}	6	3
LL	(France) H Grenier	7^{8}	4	6
(Argentina) F Comesaña	6	6
Alt	(China) Y Wu	3	4
(Australia) A Walton	6	6
(Netherlands) J de Jong	2	4

Second round
8	(Argentina) JM Cerúndolo	7^{12}	6
LL	(India) D Suresh	6^{10}	3
LL	(France) H Grenier	5	6^{2}
10	(Argentina) S Báez	7	7^{7}
16	(Germany) D Altmaier	6	7^{8}
(Argentina) F Comesaña	1	6^{6}
(Australia) A Walton	2	7	3
3	(Peru) I Buse	6	5	6

Third round
8	(Argentina) JM Cerúndolo	6	4
10	(Argentina) S Báez	2	0^{r}
16	(Germany) D Altmaier	6^{5}	5
3	(Peru) I Buse	7^{7}	7

Quarterfinals
8	(Argentina) JM Cerúndolo	6^{4}	6	2
3	(Peru) I Buse	7^{7}	4	6

==== Section 4 ====
First round
(Australia) R Hijikata	6	7^{7}
WC	(United States) Dar Blanch	4	6^{2}
(Poland) K Majchrzak	4	6^{7}
(France) B Bonzi	6	7^{9}
(Spain) P Carreño Busta	4	0^{r}
(Paraguay) AD Vallejo	6	3
WC	(Spain) M Landaluce	4	7^{7}	1
(Italy) M Bellucci	6	6^{3}	6

Second round
5	(Belgium) R Collignon	6	6^{7}	6^{5}
(Australia) R Hijikata	3	7^{9}	7^{7}
(France) B Bonzi	2	7^{7}	6
12	(France) Q Halys	6	6^{5}	3
13	(Netherlands) B van de Zandschulp	6	6
(Paraguay) AD Vallejo	2	0
(Italy) M Bellucci	6	4	2
2	(Italy) L Darderi	2	6	6

Third round
(Australia) R Hijikata	1	1
(France) B Bonzi	6	6
13	(Netherlands) B van de Zandschulp	6	6
2	(Italy) L Darderi	1	0

Quarterfinals
(France) B Bonzi	7^{7}	6
13	(Netherlands) B van de Zandschulp	6^{5}	4

== Qualifying ==
=== Seeds ===
1. (Jordan) Abdullah Shelbayh (qualified)
2. (France) Felix Balshaw (qualified)
3. (France) Hugo Grenier (qualifying competition, lucky loser)
4. (France) Pierre-Hugues Herbert (qualifying competition, lucky loser)
5. (Australia) Marc Polmans (first round)
6. (India) Dhakshineswar Suresh (qualifying competition, lucky loser)
7. (Netherlands) Mees Röttgering (qualified)
8. (United States) Quinn Vandecasteele (qualified)

=== Qualifiers ===
1. (Jordan) Abdullah Shelbayh
2. (France) Felix Balshaw
3. (Netherlands) Mees Röttgering
4. (United States) Quinn Vandecasteele

=== Lucky losers ===
1. (France) Hugo Grenier
2. (India) Dhakshineswar Suresh
3. (United States) Sebastian Gorzny
4. (France) Pierre-Hugues Herbert

=== Draw ===
==== First qualifier ====
First round
1	(Jordan) Abdullah Shelbayh	2	7^{7}	6
Alt	(United States) Ryan Seggerman	6	6^{4}	3
Alt	(Spain) Roger Pascual Ferrà	6	3	4
6	(India) Dhakshineswar Suresh	3	6	6

Qualifying competition
1	(Jordan) Abdullah Shelbayh	6	3	6
6	(India) Dhakshineswar Suresh	3	6	3

==== Second qualifier ====
First round
2	(France) Felix Balshaw	7	6
WC	(United Kingdom) Luca Pow	5	3
WC	(United States) Sebastian Gorzny	6	1	6
5	(Australia) Marc Polmans	2	6	2

Qualifying competition
2	(France) Felix Balshaw	4	6	6
WC	(United States) Sebastian Gorzny	6	4	3

==== Third qualifier ====
First round
3	(France) Hugo Grenier	6	6
Alt	(Austria) Neil Oberleitner	4	1
Alt	(United States) Hunter Heck	1	0
7	(Netherlands) Mees Röttgering	6	6

Qualifying competition
3	(France) Hugo Grenier	4	1
7	(Netherlands) Mees Röttgering	6	6

==== Fourth qualifier ====
First round
4	(France) Pierre-Hugues Herbert	6	4	6
Alt	(Japan) Kenta Miyoshi	2	6	2
(Australia) Li Tu	3	2
8	(United States) Quinn Vandecasteele	6	6

Qualifying competition
4	(France) Pierre-Hugues Herbert	6	6^{4}	5
8	(United States) Quinn Vandecasteele	3	7^{7}	7
