= 2021 Lima Challenger II – Singles =

Singles
- 2021 Lima Challenger II

Final
- Champion: (Chile) Nicolás Jarry
- Runner-up: (Argentina) Juan Manuel Cerúndolo
- Score: 6–2, 7–5

Events
Singles	Doubles
- Lima Challenger

Hugo Dellien was the defending champion but lost in the quarterfinals to Juan Manuel Cerúndolo.

Nicolás Jarry won the title after defeating Cerúndolo 6–2, 7–5 in the final.

== Seeds ==
1. (Brazil) Thiago Monteiro (withdrew)
2. (Argentina) Juan Manuel Cerúndolo (final)
3. (Colombia) Daniel Elahi Galán (first round)
4. (Argentina) Francisco Cerúndolo (withdrew)
5. (Argentina) Sebastián Báez (withdrew)
6. (Brazil) Thiago Seyboth Wild (second round)
7. (Bolivia) Hugo Dellien (quarterfinals)
8. (Peru) Juan Pablo Varillas (semifinals)
9. (Argentina) Tomás Martín Etcheverry (quarterfinals)
10. (Chile) Marcelo Tomás Barrios Vera (quarterfinals)

== Draw ==
Key

- Q = Qualifier
- WC = Wild card
- LL = Lucky loser
- Alt = Alternate
- ITF = ITF entry
- PR = Protected ranking
- SR = Special ranking
- SE = Special exempt
- JE = Junior exempt
- JR = Junior Accelerator Programme entrant
- CO = College Accelerator Programme entrant
- NG = Next Gen Accelerator Program entrant
- w/o = Walkover
- r = Retired
- d = Defaulted

=== Finals ===
Semifinals
(Czech Republic) Vít Kopřiva	3	3
(Chile) Nicolás Jarry	6	6
8	(Peru) Juan Pablo Varillas	5	6	3
2	(Argentina) Juan Manuel Cerúndolo	7	1	6

Final
(Chile) Nicolás Jarry	6	7
2	(Argentina) Juan Manuel Cerúndolo	2	5

=== Top half ===
First round
10	(Chile) MT Barrios Vera	6	6
Q	(Argentina) H Casanova	4	2
(Bulgaria) D Kuzmanov	5	1
Q	(Argentina) G Villanueva	7	6
(Czech Republic) V Kopřiva	6	4	6
(Argentina) R Olivo	1	6	3
Alt	(Colombia) N Mejía	2	4
6	(Brazil) T Seyboth Wild	6	6
3	(Colombia) DE Galán	3	5
LL	(Colombia) C Rodríguez	6	7
WC	(Peru) A Huertas del Pino	5	0
(Chile) N Jarry	7	6
PR	(Austria) G Melzer	6	6
LL	(France) Jean Thirouin	3	1
(Chile) A Tabilo	6	6
Q	(Bulgaria) A Lazarov	1	4

Second round
10	(Chile) MT Barrios Vera	7	6
Q	(Argentina) G Villanueva	5	1
(Czech Republic) V Kopřiva	6	6
6	(Brazil) T Seyboth Wild	4	3
LL	(Colombia) C Rodríguez	3	6^{3}
(Chile) N Jarry	6	7^{7}
PR	(Austria) G Melzer	3	3
(Chile) A Tabilo	6	6

Quarterfinals
10	(Chile) MT Barrios Vera	4	6	0
(Czech Republic) V Kopřiva	6	1	6
(Chile) N Jarry	7^{8}	6
(Chile) A Tabilo	6^{6}	2

Semifinals
(Czech Republic) V Kopřiva	3	3
(Chile) N Jarry	6	6

=== Bottom half ===
First round
8	(Peru) JP Varillas	6	6
Alt	(Serbia) P Krstin	3	1
(Argentina) A Collarini	6	6
Q	(Czech Republic) J Pospíšil	1	4
(Netherlands) J de Jong	2	7^{7}	7^{7}
Alt	(Ecuador) R Quiroz	6	6^{4}	6^{5}
(Argentina) JP Ficovich	5	6	4
9	(Argentina) TM Etcheverry	7	2	6
7	(Bolivia) H Dellien	0	6	6
Alt	(Portugal) G Oliveira	6	2	2
(Argentina) N Kicker	4	7^{7}	6
WC	(Peru) N Álvarez	6	6^{4}	2
WC	(Peru) C Huertas del Pino	3	4
LL	(Canada) A Galarneau	6	6
Alt	(Brazil) O Luz	6	1	4
2	(Argentina) JM Cerúndolo	4	6	6

Second round
8	(Peru) JP Varillas	6	6
(Argentina) A Collarini	2	1
(Netherlands) J de Jong	5	4
9	(Argentina) TM Etcheverry	7	6
7	(Bolivia) H Dellien	6	6
(Argentina) N Kicker	2	0
LL	(Canada) A Galarneau	5	4
2	(Argentina) JM Cerúndolo	7	6

Quarterfinals
8	(Peru) JP Varillas	6	6
9	(Argentina) TM Etcheverry	4	4
7	(Bolivia) H Dellien	6^{4}	7^{7}	4
2	(Argentina) JM Cerúndolo	7^{7}	6^{5}	6

Semifinals
8	(Peru) JP Varillas	5	6	3
2	(Argentina) JM Cerúndolo	7	1	6
