= 2023 Lima Challenger =

- Date: 21–26 August
- Edition: 19th
- Surface: Clay
- Location: Lima, Peru

Champions

Singles
- (Ecuador) Álvaro Guillén Meza

Doubles
- (Peru) Gonzalo Bueno / (Paraguay) Daniel Vallejo
- Lima Challenger

The 2023 Lima Challenger was a professional tennis tournament played on clay courts. It was the 19th edition of the tournament which was part of the 2023 ATP Challenger Tour. It took place in Lima, Peru between 21 and 26 August 2023.

== Singles main-draw entrants ==
=== Seeds ===
Country	Player	Rank^{1}	Seed
ARG	Juan Pablo Ficovich	272	1
ARG	Renzo Olivo	280	2
BRA	João Lucas Reis da Silva	287	3
BOL	Murkel Dellien	288	4
BRA	Gustavo Heide	343	5
CHI	Gonzalo Lama	372	6
BRA	Daniel Dutra da Silva	402	7
PER	Gonzalo Bueno	445	8

- ^{1} Rankings are as of 14 August 2023.

=== Other entrants ===
The following players received wildcards into the singles main draw:

- (United States) Milledge Cossu
- (Peru) Arklon Huertas del Pino
- (Peru) Conner Huertas del Pino

The following players received entry from the qualifying draw:

- (Peru) Ignacio Buse
- (Argentina) Matías Franco Descotte
- (Argentina) Guido Iván Justo
- (United States) Victor Lilov
- (Bolivia) Juan Carlos Prado Ángelo
- (Brazil) Pedro Sakamoto

== Champions ==
=== Singles ===
- (Ecuador) Álvaro Guillén Meza def. (Jamaica) Blaise Bicknell 7–6^{(7–3)}, 6–1.

=== Doubles ===
- (Peru) Gonzalo Bueno / (Paraguay) Daniel Vallejo def. (Peru) Ignacio Buse / (Peru) Jorge Panta 6–4, 6–2.
