= 2021 Lima Challenger II =

- Date: 25–31 October
- Edition: 16th
- Surface: Clay
- Location: Lima, Peru

Champions

Singles
- (Chile) Nicolás Jarry

Doubles
- (Peru) Sergio Galdós / (Portugal) Gonçalo Oliveira
- Lima Challenger

The 2021 Lima Challenger II was a professional tennis tournament played on clay courts. It was the sixteenth edition of the tournament which was part of the 2021 ATP Challenger Tour. It took place in Lima, Peru between 25 and 31 October 2021.

== Singles main-draw entrants ==
=== Seeds ===
| Country | Player | Rank^{1} | Seed |
|---|---|---|---|
| ~~BRA~~ | ~~Thiago Monteiro~~ | ~~92~~ | ~~1~~ |
| ARG | Juan Manuel Cerúndolo | 102 | 2 |
| COL | Daniel Elahi Galán | 107 | 3 |
| ~~ARG~~ | ~~Francisco Cerúndolo~~ | ~~116~~ | ~~4~~ |
| ~~ARG~~ | ~~Sebastián Báez~~ | ~~124~~ | ~~5~~ |
| BRA | Thiago Seyboth Wild | 126 | 6 |
| BOL | Hugo Dellien | 128 | 7 |
| PER | Juan Pablo Varillas | 129 | 8 |
| ARG | Tomás Martín Etcheverry | 138 | 9 |
| CHI | Marcelo Tomás Barrios Vera | 145 | 10 |

- ^{1} Rankings are as of 18 October 2021.

=== Other entrants ===
The following players received wildcards into the singles main draw:

- (Peru) Nicolás Álvarez
- (Peru) Arklon Huertas del Pino
- (Peru) Conner Huertas del Pino

The following player received entry into the singles main draw using a protected ranking:

- (Austria) Gerald Melzer

The following players received entry into the singles main draw as alternates:

- (Serbia) Peđa Krstin
- (Brazil) Orlando Luz
- (Colombia) Nicolás Mejía
- (Portugal) Gonçalo Oliveira
- (Ecuador) Roberto Quiroz

The following players received entry from the qualifying draw:

- (Argentina) Hernán Casanova
- (Bulgaria) Alexandar Lazarov
- (Czech Republic) Jaroslav Pospíšil
- (Argentina) Gonzalo Villanueva

The following players received entry as lucky losers:

- (Canada) Alexis Galarneau
- (Colombia) Cristian Rodríguez
- (France) Jean Thirouin

== Champions ==
=== Singles ===
- (Chile) Nicolás Jarry def. (Argentina) Juan Manuel Cerúndolo 6–2, 7–5.

=== Doubles ===
- (Peru) Sergio Galdós / (Portugal) Gonçalo Oliveira def. (Chile) Marcelo Tomás Barrios Vera / (Chile) Alejandro Tabilo 6–2, 2–6, [10–5].
