= Jonáš Forejtek =

Czech tennis player (born 2001)

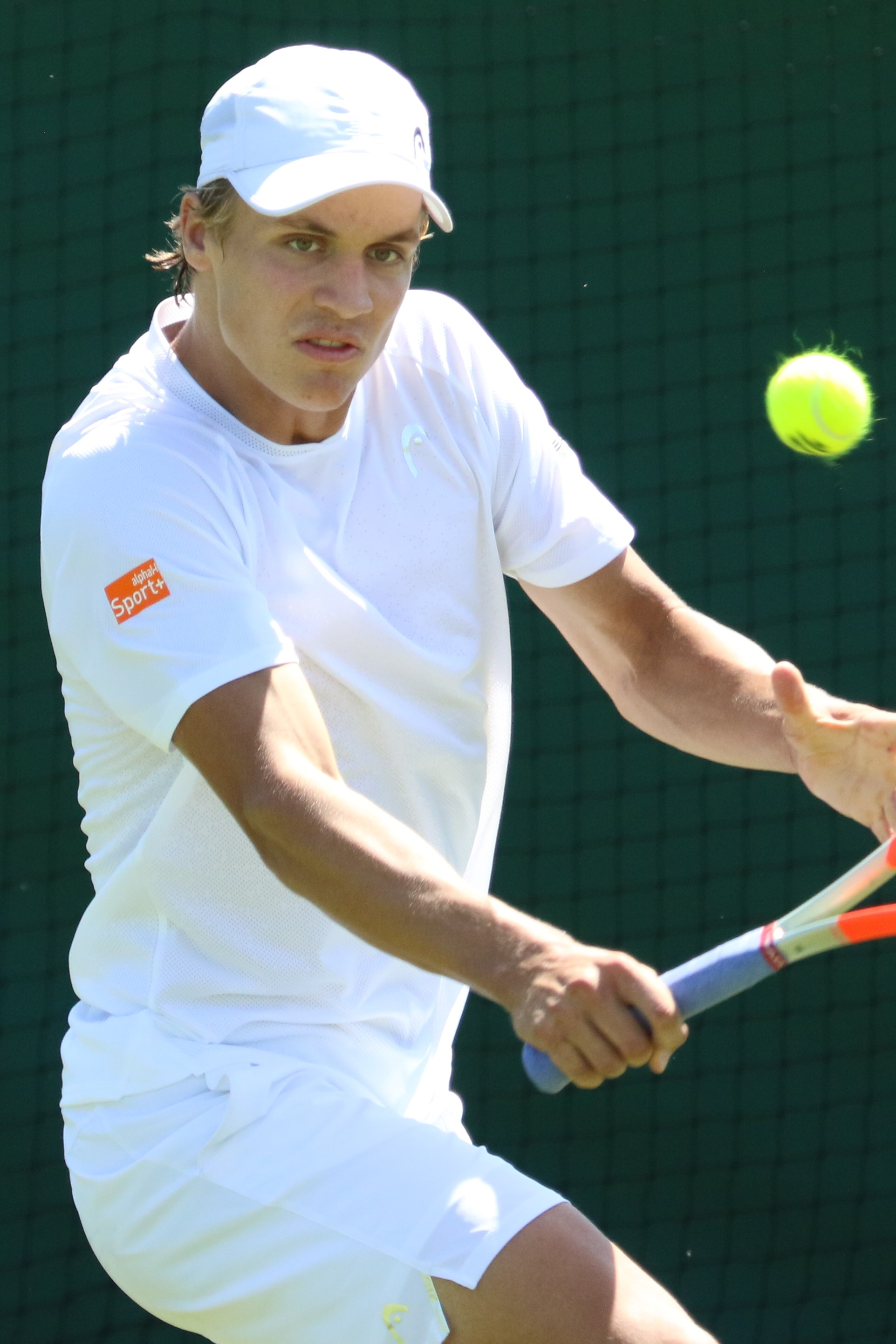
- Forejtek at the 2022 Wimbledon Championships
- Country (sports): Czech Republic
- Born: 10 March 2001 (age 25) Plzeň, Czech Republic
- Plays: Right-handed (two-handed backhand)
- Coach: Sláva Doseděl
- Prize money: US $280,276

Singles
- Career record: 3–1
- Career titles: 0
- Highest ranking: No. 217 (1 August 2022)
- Current ranking: No. 288 (16 November 2026)

Grand Slam singles results
- Wimbledon: Q1 (2022)
- US Open: Q1 (2022)

Doubles
- Career record: 0–1
- Career titles: 0; 5 Challenger
- Highest ranking: No. 300 (27 October 2025)
- Current ranking: No. 625 (16 November 2026)

Team competitions
- Davis Cup: 2–0
- Last updated on: 16 November 2026.

Jonáš Forejtek (born 10 March 2001) is a professional tennis player from the Czech Republic. Forejtek has a career high ATP singles ranking of World No. 217, achieved on 1 August 2022 and a career high ATP doubles ranking of No. 300, achieved on 27 October 2025. He won the 2019 Junior singles US Open. He reached the ITF world No. 1 Junior combined ranking on 9 September 2019.

Forejtek has reached ten career singles finals, with a record of 5 wins and 5 losses all on the ITF Futures Tour. Additionally, he has reached ten career doubles finals, with a record of 8 wins and 2 losses which includes a 5–1 record in ATP Challenger Tour finals.

== Career ==
=== 2019: Junior No. 1, First Challenger title in doubles ===
In 2019, Forejtek reached three junior Grand Slam finals, one in singles and two in doubles, winning them all. At the 2019 Australian Forejtek and compatriot partner Dalibor Svrčina won the boys' doubles title beating Americans Emilio Nava and Cannon Kingsley 7–6^{(7–5)}, 6–4 in the finals. At the 2019 Wimbledon Championships he partnered with another compatriot Jiří Lehečka capturing his second boys' grand slam doubles title, defeating Govind Nanda and Liam Draxl 7–5, 6–4 in the championship match. At the 2019 Junior US Open, he defeated Emilio Nava 6–7^{(4–7)}, 6–0, 6–2 in the final to win the boys’ singles championship. Forejtek was the World No. 1 male junior player according to the ITF combined singles and doubles junior rankings, achieved on 9 September 2019.

As wildcard entrants, Forejtek and fellow Czech Michael Vrbenský won the doubles title at the 2019 Svijany Open challenger tournament in Liberec, Czech Republic. Impressively, they defeated third seeds in the quarterfinals (or second round), the top seeds in the semifinals and then claimed the title by bettering the second seeds Nikola Ćaćić and Antonio Šančić in the final.

=== 2020–22: ATP and top 250 debuts in singles ===
Forejtek made his ATP debut at 2020 Sofia Open receiving a wildcard entry into the singles main draw. He proceeded to claim an upset victory over former world No. 3 Marin Čilić in the first round, losing just 5 games in a little over an hour. He was then defeated by another former top 10 player Richard Gasquet.

In May 2022, Forejtek made his top 250 debut at No. 226, following a semifinal showing as a qualifier at the 2022 Heilbronner Neckarcup Challenger in Germany.

=== 2024–26: Challenger 125 title and top 300 in doubles ===
Forejtek won his biggest ATP Challenger Tour 125 doubles title at the 2025 Copa Sevilla with Dominik Kellovský.

== Performance timeline ==
Key
W	F	SF	QF	#R	RR	Q#	P#	DNQ	A	Z#	PO	G	S	B	NMS	NTI	P	NH

(W) winner; (F) finalist; (SF) semifinalist; (QF) quarterfinalist; (#R) rounds 4, 3, 2, 1; (RR) round-robin stage; (Q#) qualification round; (P#) preliminary round; (DNQ) did not qualify; (A) absent; (Z#) Davis/Fed Cup Zonal Group (with number indication) or (PO) play-off; (G) gold, (S) silver or (B) bronze Olympic/Paralympic medal; (NMS) not a Masters tournament; (NTI) not a Tier I tournament; (P) postponed; (NH) not held; (SR) strike rate (events won / competed); (W–L) win–loss record.
To avoid confusion and double counting, these charts are updated at the conclusion of a tournament or when the player's participation has ended.

=== Singles ===
Current through the 2022 ATP Tour

Tournament	2019	2020	2021	2022	SR	W–L
Grand Slam tournaments
Australian Open	A	A	A		0 / 0	0–0
French Open	A	A	A		0 / 0	0–0
Wimbledon	A	NH	A	Q1	0 / 0	0–0
US Open	A	A	A	Q1	0 / 0	0–0
Win–loss	0–0	0–0	0–0	0–0	0 / 0	0-0
National representation
Olympic Games	Not Held		A	NH	0 / 0	0–0
Davis Cup	Z1	RR		A	0 / 1	2–0
Career statistics
	2019	2020	2021	2022	Career	
Tournaments	0	1	0		1	
Titles–Finals	0–0	0–0	0–0		0–0	
Overall win–loss	2–0	1–1	0–0		3–1	
Year-end ranking	536	362	304	261	75%	

== ATP Challenger Tour finals ==
=== Singles: 2 (2 runner-ups) ===
Legend ATP Challenger (0–2)

Result	W–L	Date	Tournament	Surface	Opponent	Score
Loss	0–1	Sep 2026	Plovdiv Challenger IV, Bulgaria	Clay	(Spain) Max Alcalá Gurri	4–6, 2–6
Loss	0–2	Oct 2026	Internazionali di Sicilia, Italy	Clay	(Italy) Francesco Passaro	3–6, 7–6^{(7–2)}, 6–7^{(4–7)}

=== Doubles: 8 (5 titles, 3 runner-ups) ===
Legend ATP Challenger (5–3)	Finals by surface Hard (1–1) Clay (4–2)

Result	W–L	Date	Tournament	Surface	Partner	Opponents	Score
Win	1–0	Aug 2019	Svijany Open, Czech Republic	Clay	(Czech Republic) Michael Vrbenský	(Serbia) Nikola Ćaćić (Croatia) Antonio Šančić	6–4, 6–3
Win	2–0	Aug 2021	Prague Open, Czech Republic	Clay	(Czech Republic) Michael Vrbenský	(Russia) Evgeny Karlovskiy (Russia) Evgenii Tiurnev	6-1, 6–4
Loss	2–1	Jan 2022	Città di Forlì III, Italy	Hard (i)	(Netherlands) Jelle Sels	(Romania) Victor Vlad Cornea (Germany) Fabian Fallert	4–6, 7–6^{(8–6)}, [7–10]
Win	3–1	Jul 2024	Svijany Open, Czech Republic (2)	Clay	(Czech Republic) Michael Vrbenský	(Slovakia) Miloš Karol (Slovakia) Tomáš Lánik	7–5, 6–7^{(5–7)}, [10–4]
Win	4–1	Jan 2025	Nottingham Challenger, UK	Hard (i)	(Czech Republic) Michael Vrbenský	(Czech Republic) Jiří Barnát (Czech Republic) Filip Duda	7–6^{(7–5)}, 7–6^{(7–5)}
Win	5–1	Sep 2025	Copa Sevilla, Spain	Clay	(Czech Republic) Dominik Kellovský	(Spain) Mario Mansilla Díez (Spain) Bruno Pujol Navarro	2–6, 6–3, [10–5]
Loss	5–2	Mar 2026	Zadar Open, Croatia	Clay	(Italy) Simone Agostini	(Ecuador) Gonzalo Escobar (Croatia) Nino Serdarušić	1–6, 2–6
Loss	5–3	Oct 2026	Internazionali di Sicilia, Italy	Clay	(Germany) Max Wiskandt	(Ukraine) Oleksandr Ovcharenko (Germany) Kai Wehnelt	5–7, 2–6

== ITF Tour finals ==
=== Singles: 11 (5 titles, 6 runner-ups) ===
Legend ITF Futures/World Tennis (5–6)	Finals by surface Hard (0–2) Clay (5–3) Carpet (0–1)

Result	W–L	Date	Tournament	Surface	Opponent	Score
Loss	0–1	Nov 2018	Czech Republic F9, Valašské Meziříčí	Hard	(Poland) Karol Drzewiecki	3–6, 4–6
Loss	0–2	Apr 2019	M15 Antalya, Turkey	Clay	(Australia) Christopher O'Connell	6–2, 4–6, 1–6
Win	1–2	Aug 2019	M25 Vogau, Austria	Clay	(Argentina) Camilo Ugo Carabelli	7–6^{(9–7)}, 4–6, 6–4
Loss	1–3	Jan 2020	M25 Nüssloch, Germany	Carpet (i)	(Belgium) Ruben Bemelmans	7–6^{(7–4)}, 6–7^{(3–7)}, 2–6
Win	2–3	Feb 2020	M15 Antalya, Turkey	Clay	(Spain) Nikolás Sánchez Izquierdo	6–4, 6–3
Win	3–3	Sep 2023	M15 Buschhausen, Germany	Clay	(Germany) Louis Wessels	6–4, 6–3
Loss	3–4	Sep 2023	M25 Pardubice, Czech Republic	Clay	(Germany) Louis Wessels	4–6, 6–4, 3–6
Loss	3–5	Jan 2024	M25 Esch-sur-Alzette, Luxembourg	Hard	(United Kingdom) Jacob Fearnley	4–6, 4–6
Win	4–5	May 2025	M15 Kursumlijska Banja, Serbia	Clay	(Serbia) Branko Đurić	6–2, 6–2
Win	5–5	Jul 2025	M25 Kassel, Germany	Clay	(Spain) Carlos Sánchez Jover	6–2, 6–3
Loss	5–6	Jul 2025	M25 Ollersbach, Austria	Clay	(Ukraine) Viacheslav Bielinskyi	6–7^{(6–8)}, 6–7^{(3–7)}

=== Doubles: 5 (4 titles, 1 runner-up) ===
Legend ITF Futures/World Tennis (4–1)	Finals by surface Clay (4–0) Carpet (0–1)

Result	W–L	Date	Tournament	Surface	Partner	Opponents	Score
Loss	0–1	Oct 2018	Czech Republic F7, Liberec	Carpet (i)	(Czech Republic) Jan Mertl	(Czech Republic) Marek Gengel (Czech Republic) Petr Nouza	6–2, 3–6, [3–10]
Win	1–1	Aug 2019	M25 Vogau, Austria	Clay	(Czech Republic) Jan Mertl	(Czech Republic) Vít Kopřiva (Czech Republic) Jaroslav Pospíšil	6–4, 7–5
Win	2–1	Sep 2019	M25+H Říčany, Czech Republic	Clay	(Czech Republic) Michael Vrbenský	(Netherlands) Niels Lootsma (Czech Republic) Petr Nouza	7–6^{(7–4)}, 7–6^{(7–5)}
Win	3–1	Mar 2020	M25 Antalya, Turkey	Clay	(Czech Republic) Michael Vrbenský	(Hungary) Fábián Marozsán (Hungary) Péter Nagy	6–3, 6–4
Win	4–1	May 2025	M15 Kuršumlijska Banja, Serbia	Clay	(France) Sean Cuenin	(Bulgaria) Dinko Dinev (Bulgaria) Dian Nedev	6–2, 6–2

== Junior Grand Slam finals ==
=== Singles: 1 (title) ===
Result	Year	Tournament	Surface	Opponent	Score
Win	2019	US Open	Hard	(United States) Emilio Nava	6–7^{(4–7)}, 6–0, 6–2

=== Doubles: 2 (2 titles) ===
Result	Year	Tournament	Surface	Partner	Opponents	Score
Win	2019	Australian Open	Hard	(Czech Republic) Dalibor Svrčina	(United States) Cannon Kingsley (United States) Emilio Nava	7–6^{(7–5)}, 6–4
Win	2019	Wimbledon	Grass	(Czech Republic) Jiří Lehečka	(Canada) Liam Draxl (United States) Govind Nanda	7–5, 6–4

Awards
Preceded by Barbora Seemanová	Czech Junior Athlete of the Year; 2019	Succeeded by František Doubek
