= Dominik Kellovský =

Czech tennis player (born 1996)

- Country (sports): Czech Republic
- Born: 24 July 1996 (age 29) Havířov, Czech Republic
- Height: 1.83 m (6 ft 0 in)
- Plays: Right-handed (one-handed backhand)
- Prize money: $113,895

Singles
- Career record: 0–0 (at ATP Tour level, Grand Slam level, and in Davis Cup)
- Career titles: 1 ITF
- Highest ranking: No. 468 (5 December 2016)
- Current ranking: No. 565 (8 December 2025)

Doubles
- Career record: 0–0 (at ATP Tour level, Grand Slam level, and in Davis Cup)
- Career titles: 1 Challenger, 18 ITF
- Highest ranking: No. 328 (8 September 2025)
- Current ranking: No. 365 (8 December 2025)
- Last updated on: 6 September 2025.

Dominik Kellovský (born 24 July 1996) is a Czech tennis player. Kellovský has a career high ATP singles ranking of world No. 468 achieved on 5 December 2016. He also has a career high ATP doubles ranking of No. 328 achieved on 8 September 2025.

== Career ==
Kellovský has won his biggest ATP Challenger doubles title at the 2025 Copa Sevilla with Jonas Forejtek.
