= Jorge Panta =

Peruvian tennis player (born 1995)

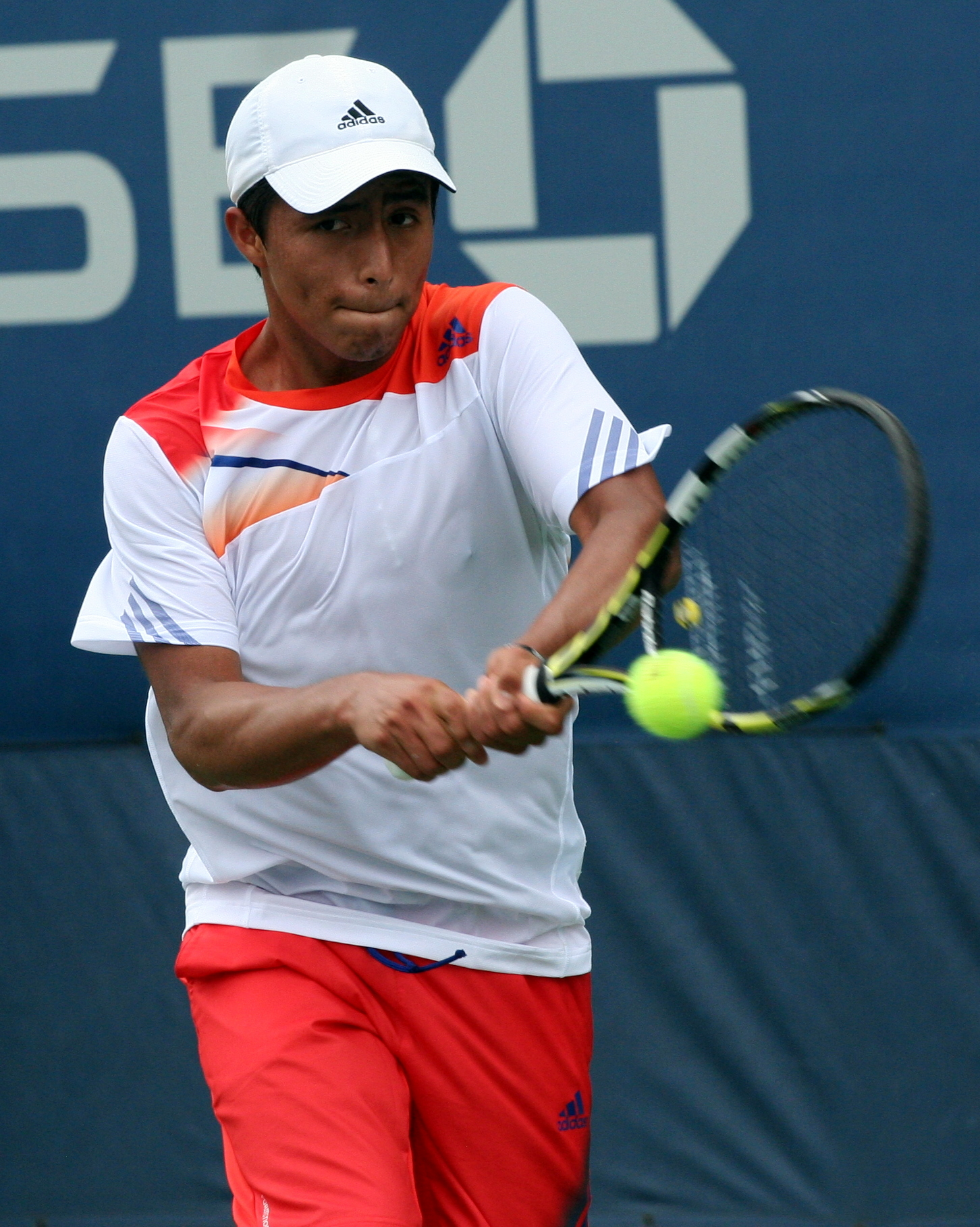
- Panta at the 2013 US Open
- Full name: Jorge Brian Panta Herreros
- Country (sports): Peru
- Residence: Lima, Peru
- Born: 22 July 1995 (age 30) Piura, Peru
- Plays: Right-handed (two handed-backhand)
- Coach: Jorge Luis Panta Yarleque
- Prize money: $107,458

Singles
- Career record: 3–2 (at ATP Tour level, Grand Slam level, and in Davis Cup)
- Career titles: 0; 0 Challenger, 1 Futures
- Highest ranking: No. 447 (24 October 2022)

Doubles
- Career record: 2–4 (at ATP Tour level, Grand Slam level, and in Davis Cup)
- Career titles: 0; 0 Challenger, 12 Futures
- Highest ranking: No. 291 (24 April 2023)

Team competitions
- Davis Cup: 2–2
Medal record
Representing Peru
Men's tennis
South American Games
Silver medal – second place	2018 Cochabamba	Men's doubles

Jorge Brian Panta Herreros (born 22 July 1995) is a Peruvian tennis player.

Panta has a career high ATP singles ranking of No. 447 achieved on 24 October 2022 and a career high ATP doubles ranking of No. 291 achieved on 24 April 2023. Panta has won 5 ITF doubles titles. He also had reached a career high ranking of 9 on the juniors circuit, where he was a semifinalist at the 2012 US Open boys' doubles event.

Panta has represented Peru at the Davis Cup where he has a W/L record of 2–2.

== ATP Challenger and ITF Futures finals ==
=== Singles: 11 (3–8) ===
Legend ATP Challenger (0–0) ITF Futures (3–8)	Finals by surface Hard (2–5) Clay (1–3) Grass (0–0) Carpet (0–0)

Result	W–L	Date	Tournament	Tier	Surface	Opponent	Score
Loss	0–1	Apr 2014	Peru F3, Lima	Futures	Clay	(Portugal) Rui Machado	1–6, 2–6
Loss	0–2	Jul 2014	Venezuela F3, Maracaibo	Futures	Hard	(Ecuador) Roberto Quiroz	3–6, 4–6
Win	1–2	Sep 2019	M15 Cancún, Mexico	World Tennis Tour	Hard	(Peru) Mauricio Echazú	2–6, 6–2, 6–3
Loss	1–3	Oct 2019	M15 Santa Tecla, El Salvador	World Tennis Tour	Hard	(Venezuela) Ricardo Rodriguez	6–3, 3–6, 4–6
Loss	1–4	Oct 2019	M15 Cancún, Mexico	World Tennis Tour	Hard	(United States) Alec Adamson	6–4, 3–6, 2–6
Loss	1–5	Dec 2019	M15 Cancún, Mexico	World Tennis Tour	Hard	(United States) Nick Chappell	3–6, 3–6
Loss	1–6	Nov 2021	M15 Cochabamba, Bolivia	World Tennis Tour	Hard	(Argentina) Tomas Farjat	4–6, 6–7^{(5–7)}
Loss	1–7	Dec 2021	M15 Santo Domingo, Dominican Republic	World Tennis Tour	Hard	(Denmark) Johannes Ingildsen	4–6, 3–6
Win	2–7	Aug 2022	M15 Cancún, Mexico	World Tennis Tour	Hard	(Australia) Adam Walton	1–6, 6–3, 6–4
Win	3–7	Oct 2022	M15 Manizales, Colombia	World Tennis Tour	Clay	(Brazil) Gustavo Heide	6–1, 3–6, 7–6^{(7–3)}
Loss	3–8	Nov 2022	M15 Lima, Peru	World Tennis Tour	Clay	(United States) Victor Lilov	6–2, 3–6, 1–6

=== Doubles: 38 (17–21) ===
Legend ATP Challenger (0–1) ITF Futures (17–20)	Finals by surface Hard (8–9) Clay (9–12) Grass (0–0) Carpet (0–0)

Result	W–L	Date	Tournament	Tier	Surface	Partner	Opponents	Score
Loss	0–1	May 2014	Mexico F4, Morelia	Futures	Hard	(Peru) Mauricio Echazú	(Mexico) Cesar Remirez (Mexico) Miguel Ángel Reyes-Varela	6–7^{(3–7)}, 3–6
Win	1–1	Jul 2014	Mexico F8, Quintana Roo	Futures	Hard	(Peru) Mauricio Echazú	(Peru) Duilio Vallebuona (Mexico) Lucas Gomez	6–1, 7–6^{(7–1)}
Loss	1–2	Jul 2014	Venezuela F2, Valencia	Futures	Hard	(Peru) Duilio Vallebuona	(Argentina) Mateo Nicolas Martinez (Mexico) Luis Patiño	2–6, 4–6
Win	2–2	Aug 2014	Peru F4, Arequipa	Futures	Clay	(Peru) Juan Pablo Varillas	(Japan) Ryusei Makiguchi (United States) Devin McCarthy	6–3, 3–6, [10–6]
Loss	2–3	Oct 2014	Peru F7, Lima	Futures	Clay	(Argentina) Eduardo Agustin Torre	(Monaco) Romain Arneodo (Monaco) Benjamin Balleret	6–4, 3–6, [1–10]
Win	3–3	May 2015	Mexico F3, Mexico City	Futures	Hard	(Peru) Mauricio Echazú	(Mexico) Alberto Rojas-Maldonado (Mexico) Mauricio Astorga	6–4, 6–3
Loss	3–4	Sep 2015	Bolivia F2, La Paz	Futures	Clay	(Peru) Mauricio Echazú	(Guatemala) Christopher Díaz Figueroa (Argentina) Franco Feitt	6–2, 4–6, [8–10]
Loss	3–5	Sep 2015	Bolivia F3, Cochabamba	Futures	Clay	(Peru) Mauricio Echazú	(Bolivia) Federico Zeballos (Mexico) Manuel Sánchez	3–6, 2–6
Loss	3–6	Nov 2015	Venezuela F2, Maracay	Futures	Hard	(Peru) Mauricio Echazú	(Argentina) Agustín Velotti (Venezuela) Luis David Martinez	3–6, 4–6
Win	4–6	Nov 2015	Peru F4, Lima	Futures	Clay	(Ecuador) Iván Endara	(Chile) Guillermo Rivera Aránguiz (Chile) Cristóbal Saavedra Corvalán	6–3, 7–6^{(7–5)}
Win	5–6	Nov 2015	Peru F5, Lima	Futures	Clay	(Ecuador) Iván Endara	(Argentina) Andrea Collarini (Argentina) Juan Ignacio Galarza	walkover
Win	6–6	Oct 2016	Ecuador F2, Quito	Futures	Clay	(Bolivia) Alejandro Mendoza	(Peru) Mauricio Echazú (Bolivia) Federico Zeballos	walkover
Win	7–6	Nov 2016	Bolivia F1, La Paz	Futures	Clay	(Peru) Mauricio Echazú	(Bolivia) Hugo Dellien (Bolivia) Federico Zeballos	6–2, 7–6^{(7–3)}
Loss	7–7	Nov 2016	Bolivia F2, Cochabamba	Futures	Clay	(Peru) Mauricio Echazú	(Argentina) Franco Agamenone (Argentina) Matias Zukas	6–7^{(3–7)}, 3–6
Win	8–7	Dec 2017	Peru F2, Lima	Futures	Clay	(United States) Junior Alexander Ore	(Bolivia) Boris Arias (Bolivia) Federico Zeballos	6–1, 7–5
Win	9–7	May 2018	Mexico F2, Mexico City	Futures	Hard	(United States) Junior Alexander Ore	(United States) Harrison Adams (United States) Miles Seemann	6–3, 6–7^{(1–7)}, [10–6]
Win	10–7	Oct 2018	Peru F3, Lima	Futures	Clay	(United States) Junior Alexander Ore	(Argentina) Manuel Pena Lopez (Argentina) Genaro Alberto Olivieri	6–3, 6–3
Loss	10–8	Nov 2018	Chile F1, Viña del Mar	Futures	Clay	(Peru) Mauricio Echazú	(Argentina) Mateo Nicolas Martinez (Chile) Juan Carlos Sáez	3–6, 6–7^{(0–7)}
Win	11–8	Mar 2019	M15 Cancún, Mexico	World Tennis Tour	Hard	(Mexico) Gerardo Lopez Villasenor	(Brazil) João Lucas Reis da Silva (Brazil) Fernando Yamacita	7–6^{(11–9)}, 4–6, [10–8]
Loss	11–9	Apr 2019	M15 Cancún, Mexico	World Tennis Tour	Hard	(Ecuador) Iván Endara	(Republic of Ireland) Julian Bradley (United States) Henry Craig	3–6, 3–6
Loss	11–10	Sep 2019	M15 Cancún, Mexico	World Tennis Tour	Hard	(Colombia) Juan Sebastián Gómez	(Republic of Ireland) Julian Bradley (United Kingdom) Jack Findel-hawkins	6–7^{(2–7)}, 5–7
Loss	11–11	Sep 2019	M15 Cancún, Mexico	World Tennis Tour	Hard	(Colombia) Juan Sebastián Gómez	(Republic of Ireland) Julian Bradley (United Kingdom) Jack Findel-hawkins	3–6, 2–6
Win	12–11	Sep 2019	M15 Cancún, Mexico	World Tennis Tour	Hard	(Colombia) Juan Sebastián Gómez	(Colombia) Cristian Rodríguez (Colombia) Felipe Mantilla	2–6, 6–4, [11–9]
Loss	12–12	Dec 2019	M15 Cancún, Mexico	World Tennis Tour	Hard	(Bolivia) Juan Carlos Manuel Aguilar	(United States) Reese Stalder (United States) Tanner K Smith	7–6^{(7–3)}, 1–6, [9–11]
Loss	12–13	Feb 2020	M25 Lima, Peru	World Tennis Tour	Clay	(Argentina) Nicolas Alberto Arreche	(Chile) Marcelo Tomas Barrios Vera (Spain) Carlos Gómez-Herrera	5–7, 2–6
Loss	12–14	Feb 2020	M25 Lima, Peru	World Tennis Tour	Clay	(Peru) Nicolas Alvarez	(Peru) Conner Huertas del Pino (Peru) Sergio Galdós	4–6, 6–4, [5–10]
Loss	12–15	Jun 2021	M25 Santo Domingo, Dominican Republic	World Tennis Tour	Hard	(Peru) Conner Huertas del Pino	(Ecuador) Diego Hidalgo (Brazil) Igor Marcondes	5–7, 7–6^{(12–10)}, [6–10]
Win	13–15	Jun 2021	M25 Santo Domingo, Dominican Republic	World Tennis Tour	Hard	(Peru) Conner Huertas del Pino	(Ecuador) Diego Hidalgo (Brazil) Igor Marcondes	7–6^{(9–7)}, 2–6, [10–7]
Loss	13–16	Aug 2021	M25 Guayaquil, Ecuador	World Tennis Tour	Clay	(Peru) Conner Huertas del Pino	(Ecuador) Diego Hidalgo (Colombia) Cristian Rodríguez	3–6, 7–6^{(9–7)}, [6–10]
Win	14–16	Oct 2021	M25 Lima, Peru	World Tennis Tour	Clay	(Bolivia) Murkel Dellien	(Ecuador) Cayetano March (Spain) Pol Martín Tiffon	7–6^{(7–4)}, 7–6^{(7–3)}
Loss	14–17	Oct 2021	M15 Cancún, Mexico	World Tennis Tour	Hard	(Dominican Republic) Peter Bertran	(United States) Mbwendwa Mbithi (Canada) Joshua Peck	5–7, 6–7^{(4–7)}
Loss	14–18	Nov 2021	M15 Cochabamba, Bolivia	World Tennis Tour	Clay	(United States) Dali Blanch	(Bolivia) Boris Arias (Venezuela) Brandon Perez	6–3, 1–6, [5–10]
Win	15–18	Feb 2022	M15 Cancún, Mexico	World Tennis Tour	Hard	(Peru) Arklon Huertas del Pino	(United States) Ryan Dickerson (Italy) Francesco Ferrari	4–6, 6–3, [10–5]
Loss	15–19	Feb 2022	M15 Punta Cana, Dominican Republic	World Tennis Tour	Clay	(Peru) Conner Huertas del Pino	(Austria) David Pichler (Ukraine) Oleg Prihodko	0–6, 2–6
Loss	15–20	Jun 2022	M15 Quito, Ecuador	World Tennis Tour	Clay	(Bolivia) Alejandro Mendoza	(Bolivia) Murkel Dellien (Peru) Arklon Huertas del Pino	3–6, 5–7
Win	16–20	Aug 2022	M15 Cancún, Mexico	World Tennis Tour	Hard	(Peru) Ignacio Buse	(Italy) Marco Brugnerotto (Moldova) Alexander Cozbinov	6–2, 7–6^{(7–5)}
Win	17–20	Nov 2022	M15 Lima, Peru	World Tennis Tour	Clay	(Peru) Conner Huertas del Pino	(Chile) Miguel Fernando Pereira (Uruguay) Ignacio Carou	walkover
Loss	17–21	Aug 2023	Lima, Peru	Challenger	Clay	(Peru) Ignacio Buse	(Peru) Gonzalo Bueno (Paraguay) Daniel Vallejo	4–6, 2–6
