= Ignacio Buse =

Peruvian tennis player (born 2004)

- Buse at the 2026 Cincinnati Open
- Full name: Ignacio Buse Acurio
- Country (sports): Peru
- Residence: Barcelona, Spain; Miami, Florida, US; Lima, Peru
- Born: 25 March 2004 (age 22) Lima, Peru
- Height: 1.83 m (6 ft 0 in)
- Plays: Right-handed (two-handed backhand)
- Coach: Juan Lizariturry
- Prize money: US $2,139,562

Singles
- Career record: 32–26 (at ATP Tour level, Grand Slam level, and in Davis Cup)
- Career titles: 2
- Highest ranking: No. 30 (31 August 2026)
- Current ranking: No. 32 (9 November 2026)

Grand Slam singles results
- Australian Open: Q1 (2025)
- French Open: 1R (2026)
- Wimbledon: 2R (2026)
- US Open: 2R (2026)

Doubles
- Career record: 6–13 (at ATP Tour level, Grand Slam level, and in Davis Cup)
- Career titles: 0
- Highest ranking: No. 414 (19 October 2026)
- Current ranking: No. 414 (19 October 2026)

Grand Slam doubles results
- French Open: 1R (2026)
- Wimbledon: 2R (2026)
- Last updated on: 19 October 2026.

Ignacio Buse Acurio (born 25 March 2004) is a Peruvian professional tennis player. He has a career-high ATP singles ranking of world No. 30 achieved on 31 August 2026 and a best doubles ranking of No. 414 achieved on 19 October 2026. He is the current No. 1 singles player from Peru.

Buse has won two ATP Tour titles in singles. He represents Peru at the Davis Cup, where he has a W/L record of 1–0.

== Early life ==
Buse was born in Lima to father Hans and mother Betty (née Acurio). His father is a tennis coach and former player. His paternal grandfather, Eduardo, and great-uncle, Enrique, were also tennis players, after whom Estadio Hermanos Buse in Lima was named. He is also the nephew of world-renowned chef Gaston Acurio.

Buse is of German descent through his great-grandfather. He began playing tennis at the Country Club de Villa in Lima. He later moved to Barcelona to train at the TEC Academy under Albert Costa.

== Career ==
=== 2022: Juniors ===
Buse was a runner-up in the boys' doubles category at the 2022 French Open, with compatriot Gonzalo Bueno. He had good results on the ITF junior circuit, maintaining a 77–38 singles win-loss record and reached an ITF junior combined ranking of world No. 9 on 3 January 2022.

=== 2023: First Challenger doubles final ===
In August, Buse reached his first Challenger doubles final in Lima partnering with Jorge Panta.

=== 2024: First Challenger singles final, top 250 ===
In February, Buse received a wildcard for the qualifying competition at the 2024 Chile Open. In August, he reached his first Challenger singles final in Como, losing to Gabriel Debru in the final.

=== 2025: Major, ATP and Top 125 debuts ===
In February, Buse made his ATP Tour debut at the 2025 Chile Open, where he received a main draw wildcard, where he lost in the first round to eventual champion Laslo Djere.

In April, Buse reached the semifinals at the Aix Provence Open as a qualifier, with wins over second seed Luciano Darderi, his first top 50 win, and Reilly Opelka. As a result, Buse rose close to 40 positions up, reaching the top 175 in the singles rankings on 5 May 2025.

In June, Buse won his maiden Challenger title at the 2025 Neckarcup 2.0, defeating Guy den Ouden in the final. As a result he reached a career high singles ranking of world No. 152 on 9 June 2025. Buse entered his second ATP Tour tournament as a qualifier, at the Swiss Open and defeated fifth seed Laslo Djere, recording his first ATP win. He reached his first ATP Tour semifinal by defeating Kamil Majchrzak in the second round, and Román Andrés Burruchaga in the quarterfinals. As a result Buse reached a new career-high in the top 150 on 21 July 2025. He lost to Juan Manuel Cerúndolo in the semifinal.

In August, Buse made his Grand Slam debut as a qualifier at the US Open. He lost to sixth seed Ben Shelton in the first round. In September, Buse won his second Challenger title at the Copa Sevilla, defeating Genaro Olivieri in the final. At the 2025 Uruguay Open in Montevideo, Buse reached his third Challenger final of the season. As a result climbed to a career-high in the top 105 in the singles rankings on 17 November 2025.

=== 2026: First ATP title, Masters debut & first wins, top 30 ===
Buse reached the top 100 on 5 January 2026. Ranked No. 91 at the ATP 500 2026 Rio Open, Buse reached a semifinal at the ATP 500-level for the first time and only his second time at the tour-level, with wins over Brazilian Igor Marcondes, third seed and another local favorite João Fonseca and Matteo Berrettini.

In March, Buse made his Masters 1000 debut at the Miami Open as a qualifier, but lost in the first round to Damir Džumhur.

In May at the ATP 500 2026 Hamburg Open, as a qualifier, Buse reached again an ATP semifinal defeating fourth seed and defending champion Flavio Cobolli, Jakub Mensik and Ugo Humbert. He defeated lucky loser Aleksandar Kovacevic to reach his first ATP Tour final, becoming the fourth Peruvian singles finalist at an ATP event in the Open Era (since 1969), and the first Peruvian to reach this stage since Luis Horna at 2007 Viña del Mar. Buse defeated Tommy Paul in the final to become the first Peruvian titlist since Horna in 2007 and the first to win an ATP 500 title since Jaime Yzaga in 1993. He was the third qualifier to win an ATP 500 crown in series history (since 2009), after Nikoloz Basilashvili won Hamburg in 2018 and Daniil Medvedev in Tokyo that same year.

As a result he reached the top 35 in the singles rankings, following the tournament, on 25 May 2026.

== Personal life ==
Buse is pursuing an online degree in business.

== Performance timeline ==
Key
W	F	SF	QF	#R	RR	Q#	DNQ	A	NH

(W) winner; (F) finalist; (SF) semifinalist; (QF) quarterfinalist; (#R) rounds 4, 3, 2, 1; (RR) round-robin stage; (Q#) qualification round; (DNQ) did not qualify; (A) absent; (NH) not held; (SR) strike rate (events won / competed); (W–L) win–loss record.

=== Singles ===
Tournament	2025	2026	SR	W–L	Win %
Grand Slam tournaments
Australian Open	Q1	A	0 / 0	0–0	–
French Open	Q1	1R	0 / 1	0–1	0%
Wimbledon	Q1	2R	0 / 1	1–1	50%
US Open	1R	2R	0 / 2	1–2	0%
Win–loss	0–1	2–3	0 / 4	2–4	33%
ATP Masters 1000
Indian Wells Masters	A	Q2	0 / 0	0–0	–
Miami Open	A	1R	0 / 1	0–1	0%
Monte Carlo Masters	A	Q1	0 / 0	0–0	–
Madrid Open	A	2R	0 / 1	1–1	50%
Italian Open	A	2R	0 / 1	1–1	50%
Canadian Open	A	2R	0 / 1	0–1	0%
Cincinnati Masters	A	2R	0 / 1	0–1	0%
Shanghai Masters	A	2R	0 / 1	0–1	0%
Paris Masters	A	3R	0 / 1	2–1	–
Win–loss	0–0	4–7	0 / 7	4–7	36%
Career statistics
Tournaments	4	13	Career total: 17		
Titles	0	1	Career total: 1		
Finals	0	1	Career total: 1		
Overall Win–Loss	6–4	14–12	1 / 17	20–16	56%
Year-end ranking	105		$1,278,808		

== ATP Tour Finals ==
=== Singles: 2 (2 titles) ===
Legend ATP 500 (1–0) ATP 250 (1–0)	Finals by surface Hard (1–0) Clay (1–0)	Finals by setting Outdoor (2–0)

Result	W–L	Date	Tournament	Tier	Surface	Opponent	Score
Win	1–0	May 2026	Hamburg Open, Germany	ATP 500	Clay	(United States) Tommy Paul	7–6^{(8–6)}, 4–6, 6–3
Win	2–0	Aug 2026	Winston-Salem Open, US	ATP 250	Hard	(United Kingdom) Arthur Fery	6–3, 6–2

== ATP Challenger Tour finals ==
Challenger

=== Singles: 4 (2 titles, 2 runner-ups) ===
Finals by surface
Hard (–)
Clay (2–2)

Result	W–L	Date	Tournament	Surface	Opponent	Score
Loss	0–1	Aug 2024	Città di Como Challenger, Italy	Clay	(France) Gabriel Debru	1–6, 6–2, 3–6
Win	1–1	Jun 2025	Neckarcup 2.0, Germany	Clay	(Netherlands) Guy den Ouden	7–5, 7–5
Win	2–1	Sep 2025	Copa Sevilla, Spain	Clay	(Argentina) Genaro Olivieri	6–3, 3–6, 6–3
Loss	2–2	Nov 2025	Uruguay Open, Uruguay	Clay	(Chile) Cristian Garín	7–6^{(7–3)}, 2–6, 2–6

=== Doubles: 1 (runner-up) ===
Result	W–L	Date	Tournament	Surface	Partner	Opponents	Score
Loss	0–1	Aug 2023	Lima Challenger, Peru	Clay	(Peru) Jorge Panta	(Peru) Gonzalo Bueno (Paraguay) Daniel Vallejo	4–6, 2–6

== ITF World Tennis Tour finals ==
World Tennis

=== Singles: 5 (3 titles, 2 runner-ups) ===
Finals by surface
Hard (–)
Clay (3–2)

Result	W–L	Date	Tournament	Surface	Opponent	Score
Loss	0–1	Nov 2022	M15 Lima, Peru	Clay	(Peru) Gonzalo Bueno	4–6, 1–6
Win	1–1	Oct 2023	M25 Mendoza, Argentina	Clay	(Argentina) Luciano Emanuel Ambrogi	7–6^{(7–4)}, 6–3
Win	2–1	Oct 2023	M25 Zapopan, Mexico	Clay	(United States) Victor Lilov	6–3, 7–6^{(7–1)}
Loss	2–2	Mar 2024	M25 Tarragona, Spain	Clay	(Germany) Marko Topo	3–6, 6–2, 2–6
Win	3–2	May 2024	M25 Vic, Spain	Clay	(Spain) Albert Pedrico Kravtsov	6–3, 6–2

=== Doubles: 2 (1 title, 1 runner-up) ===
Result	W–L	Date	Tournament	Surface	Partner	Opponents	Score
Win	1–0	Aug 2022	M15 Cancún, Mexico	Hard	(Peru) Jorge Panta	(Italy) Marco Brugnerotto (Moldova) Alexander Cozbinov	6–2, 7–6^{(7–5)}
Loss	1–1	Oct 2023	M25 Mendoza, Argentina	Clay	(Bolivia) Juan Carlos Prado Ángelo	(Peru) Arklon Huertas del Pino (Peru) Conner Huertas del Pino	4–6, 4–6

== Wins over top 10 players ==
- Buse has a 1–1 (50%) record against players who were, at the time the match was played, ranked in the top 10.

Season	2026	Total
Wins	1	1

#	Player	Rk	Event	Surface	Rd	Score	Rk	Ref
2026
1.	Daniil Medvedev	5	Paris Masters, France	Hard (i)	2R	6–4, 6–4	33	

- Key: (Rk) first use, opponent rank; (Rd) round; (Rk) 2nd use, player rank; (Ref) reference; (F) final; (SF) semifinal; (QF) quarterfinal; (#R) rounds 4, 3, 2, 1; (RR) round-robin stage; (Q#) qualifying rounds or stages (3), 2, 1.

* Statistics correct as of 4 November 2026.

== Junior Grand Slam finals ==
=== Doubles: 1 (runner-up) ===
Result	Year	Tournament	Surface	Partner	Opponents	Score
Loss	2022	French Open	Clay	(Peru) Gonzalo Bueno	(Croatia) Mili Poljičak (Lithuania) Edas Butvilas	4–6, 0–6
