= Gonzalo Bueno (tennis) =

Peruvian tennis player (born 2004)

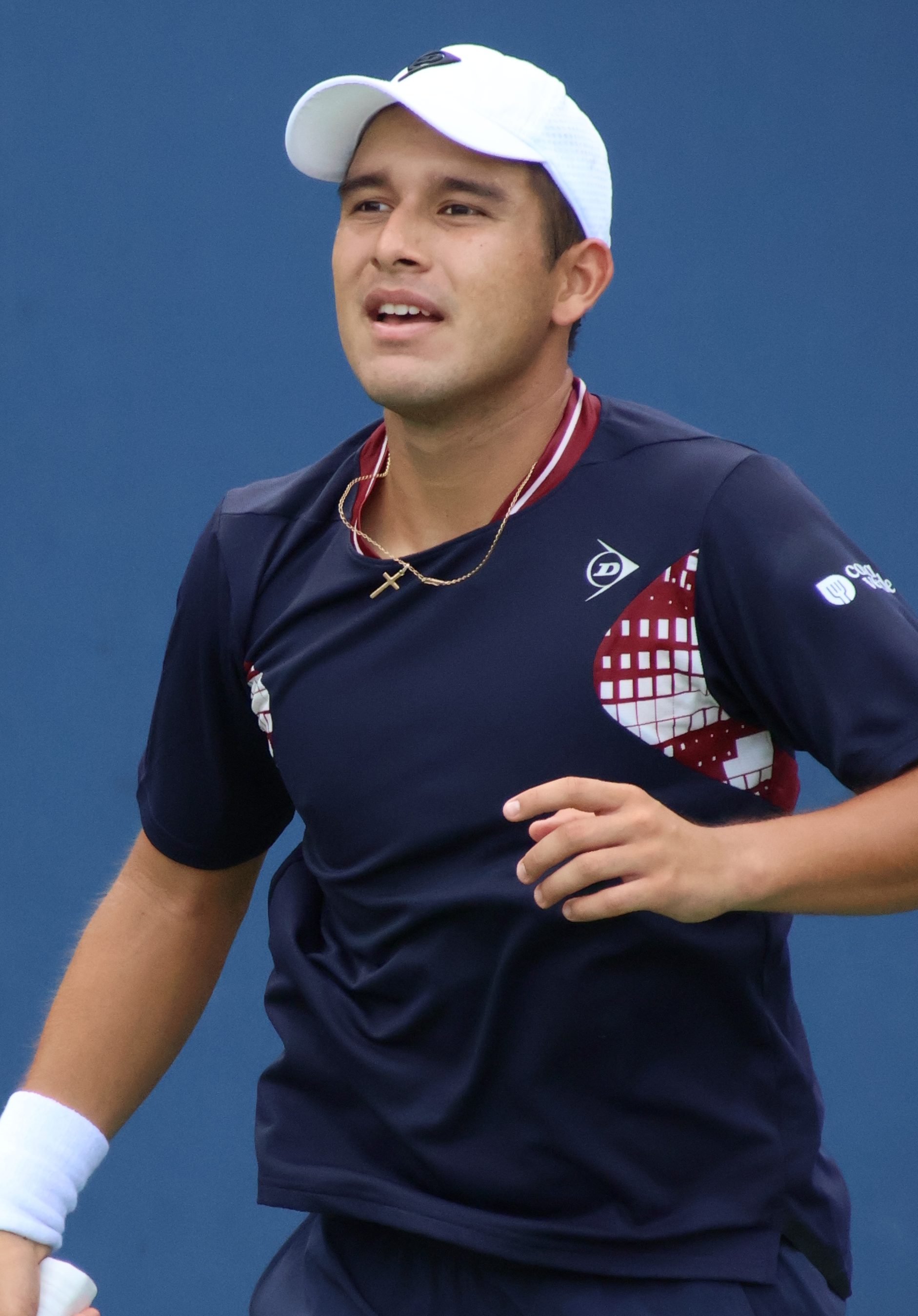
- Bueno at the 2026 US Open
- Country (sports): Peru
- Born: 3 April 2004 (age 22) Trujillo, Peru
- Height: 1.73 m (5 ft 8 in)
- Plays: Right-handed (two-handed backhand)
- Coach: Luis Horna, Francisco Cabello, Patricio Reynoso
- Prize money: US $394,733

Singles
- Career record: 4–5 (at ATP Tour level, Grand Slam level, and in Davis Cup)
- Career titles: 0
- Highest ranking: No. 160 (27 July 2026)
- Current ranking: No. 160 (27 July 2026)

Grand Slam singles results
- Australian Open: Q2 (2026)
- French Open: Q3 (2026)
- Wimbledon: Q1 (2026)
- US Open: Q1 (2026)

Doubles
- Career record: 0–1 (at ATP Tour level, Grand Slam level, and in Davis Cup)
- Career titles: 0
- Highest ranking: No. 406 (29 July 2024)
- Current ranking: No. 1,499 (27 July 2026)
- Last updated on: 27 July 2026.

Gonzalo Bueno (born 3 April 2004) is a Peruvian professional tennis player. He has a career-high ATP singles ranking of No. 160 achieved on 27 July 2026 and a doubles ranking of No. 406, reached on 29 July 2024. He is currently the No. 2 singles player from Peru.

Bueno has won four titles on ATP Challenger Tour, three in singles and one in doubles. He represents Peru at the Davis Cup, where he has a W/L record of 1–0.

== Professional career ==
=== Juniors ===
Bueno won gold in both boys' singles and doubles at the 2021 Junior Pan American Games. He was a runner-up in the boys' doubles category at the 2022 French Open, with compatriot Ignacio Buse. The Peruvian also had good results on the ITF junior circuit, maintaining a 87–37 singles win-loss record and reached an ITF junior combined ranking of world No. 5 on 11 April 2022.

=== 2022: Maiden professional title ===
In July 2022, Bueno won his first professional title at M15 Gubbio, Italy, a Futures-level event. This trophy was in the doubles category, with Ecuadorian Álvaro Guillén Meza.

Later that year, Bueno earned his first Futures title in singles, at M15 Lima, a home tournament. He defeated countryman and friend Ignacio Buse in the final.

=== 2023-2024: Challenger titles, top 300 ===
In August 2023, Bueno won his first ATP Challenger title at Lima Challenger, in the doubles category. He and Paraguayan Daniel Vallejo defeated Buse and Jorge Panta in straight sets.

In January 2024, Bueno earned his first Challenger-level title in singles, at the AAT Challenger, Argentina. He defeated Kazakhstani Dmitry Popko in the final. The Peruvian got a second trophy at Challenger Concepción, Chile, in April.

=== 2025: Third Challenger title, top 215 ===
In August, Bueno won his third Challenger title in singles at the Svijany Open, Czech Republic.

=== 2026: First major qualifying ===
In January 2026, Bueno entered the qualifying competition of the Australian Open. It was his first experience at a major, but he lost in the second round to French Pierre-Hugues Herbert.

== Performance timeline ==
Key
W	F	SF	QF	#R	RR	Q#	DNQ	A	NH

(W) winner; (F) finalist; (SF) semifinalist; (QF) quarterfinalist; (#R) rounds 4, 3, 2, 1; (RR) round-robin stage; (Q#) qualification round; (DNQ) did not qualify; (A) absent; (NH) not held; (SR) strike rate (events won / competed); (W–L) win–loss record.
To avoid confusion and double counting, these charts are updated at the conclusion of a tournament or when the player's participation has ended.

=== Singles ===
Current through the 2026 Wimbledon Championships.

Tournament	2026	SR	W–L	Win %
Grand Slam tournaments
Australian Open	Q2	0 / 0	0–0	–
French Open	Q3	0 / 0	0–0	–
Wimbledon	Q1	0 / 0	0–0	–
US Open		0 / 0	0–0	–
Win–loss	0–0	0 / 0	0–0	–
ATP Masters 1000
Indian Wells Masters	A	0 / 0	0–0	–
Miami Open	A	0 / 0	0–0	–
Monte Carlo Masters	A	0 / 0	0–0	–
Madrid Open	A	0 / 0	0-0	–
Italian Open	A	0 / 0	0–0	–
Canadian Open		0 / 0	0–0	–
Cincinnati Masters		0 / 0	0–0	–
Shanghai Masters		0 / 0	0–0	–
Paris Masters		0 / 0	0–0	–
Win–loss	0–0	0 / 0	0–0	–

== ATP Challenger Tour finals ==
=== Singles: 7 (3 titles, 4 runner-ups) ===
Legend ATP Challenger Tour (3–4)	Finals by surface Hard (–) Clay (3–4)

Result	W–L	Date	Tournament	Tier	Surface	Opponent	Score
Win	1–0	Jan 2024	Challenger AAT, Argentina	Challenger	Clay	(Kazakhstan) Dmitry Popko	6–4, 2–6, 7–6^{(7–4)}
Win	2–0	Apr 2024	Challenger Concepción, Chile	Challenger	Clay	(Argentina) Juan Pablo Ficovich	6–4, 6–0
Loss	2–1	Sep 2024	Cali Open, Colombia	Challenger	Clay	(Argentina) Juan Pablo Ficovich	1–6, 4–6
Loss	2–2	Jun 2025	Lima Challenger, Peru	Challenger	Clay	(Bolivia) Juan Carlos Prado Ángelo	4–6, 5–7
Win	3–2	Jul 2025	Svijany Open, Czech Republic	Challenger	Clay	(Argentina) Genaro Olivieri	6–2, 2–0 ret.
Loss	3–3	Apr 2026	Internacional de Campinas, Brazil	Challenger	Clay	(Brazil) Gustavo Heide	2–6, 5–7
Loss	3–4	Aug 2026	Svijany Open, Czech Republic	Challenger	Clay	(Czech Republic) Jan Kumstát	3–6, 1–6

=== Doubles: 2 (1 title, 1 runner-up) ===
Legend ATP Challenger Tour (1–1)

Result	W–L	Date	Tournament	Tier	Surface	Partner	Opponents	Score
Win	1–0	Aug 2023	Lima Challenger, Peru	Challenger	Clay	(Paraguay) Daniel Vallejo	(Peru) Jorge Panta (Peru) Ignacio Buse	6–4, 6–2
Loss	1–1	Mar 2024	Paraguay Open, Paraguay	Challenger	Clay	(Ecuador) Álvaro Guillén Meza	(Bolivia) Boris Arias (Bolivia) Federico Zeballos	2–6, 2–6

== ITF World Tennis Tour finals ==
=== Singles: 4 (3 titles, 1 runner-up) ===
Legend ITF WTT (3–1)	Finals by surface Hard (–) Clay (3–1)

Result	W–L	Date	Tournament	Tier	Surface	Opponent	Score
Win	1–0	Nov 2022	M15 Lima, Peru	WTT	Clay	(Peru) Ignacio Buse	6–4, 6–1
Win	2–0	Apr 2023	M15 Santo Domingo de los Tsáchilas, Ecuador	WTT	Clay	(Ecuador) Andrés Andrade	6–2, 6–1
Win	3–0	Apr 2023	M15 Santo Domingo de los Tsáchilas, Ecuador	WTT	Clay	(Argentina) Ignacio Monzón	6–4, 6–2
Loss	3–1	Feb 2024	M25 Punta del Este, Uruguay	WTT	Clay	(Bolivia) Murkel Dellien	4–6, 6–3, 5–7

=== Doubles: 5 (1 title, 4 runner-ups) ===
Legend ITF WTT (1–4)	Finals by surface Hard (–) Clay (1–4)

Result	W–L	Date	Tournament	Tier	Surface	Partner	Opponents	Score
Loss	0–1	Jul 2022	M15 Aprilia, Italy	WTT	Clay	(Ecuador) Álvaro Guillén Meza	(Argentina) Franco Emanuel Egea (Argentina) Gabriel Alejandro Hidalgo	2–6, 3–6
Win	1–1	Jul 2022	M15 Gubbio, Italy	WTT	Clay	(Ecuador) Álvaro Guillén Meza	(Italy) Gabriele Piraino (Italy) Francesco Forti	walkover
Loss	1–2	Nov 2022	M15 Santa Cruz, Bolivia	WTT	Clay	(Argentina) Federico Agustín Gómez	(Argentina) Ignacio Monzón (Peru) Conner Huertas del Pino	5–7, 7–6^{(7–4)}, [10–12]
Loss	1–3	Mar 2023	M15 Naples, USA	WTT	Clay	(Ecuador) Álvaro Guillén Meza	(Argentina) Ignacio Monzón (Argentina) Federico Agustín Gómez	3–6, 2–6
Loss	1–4	Jun 2023	M25 Risskov/Aarhus, Denmark	WTT	Clay	(Sweden) Jack Karlsson Wistrand	(Denmark) August Holmgren (Denmark) Christian Sigsgaard	4–6, 3–6

== Junior Grand Slam finals ==
=== Doubles: 1 (runner-up) ===
Result	Year	Tournament	Surface	Partner	Opponents	Score
Loss	2022	French Open	Clay	(Peru) Ignacio Buse	(Croatia) Mili Poljičak (Lithuania) Edas Butvilas	4–6, 0–6
