= 2024 Novak Djokovic tennis season =

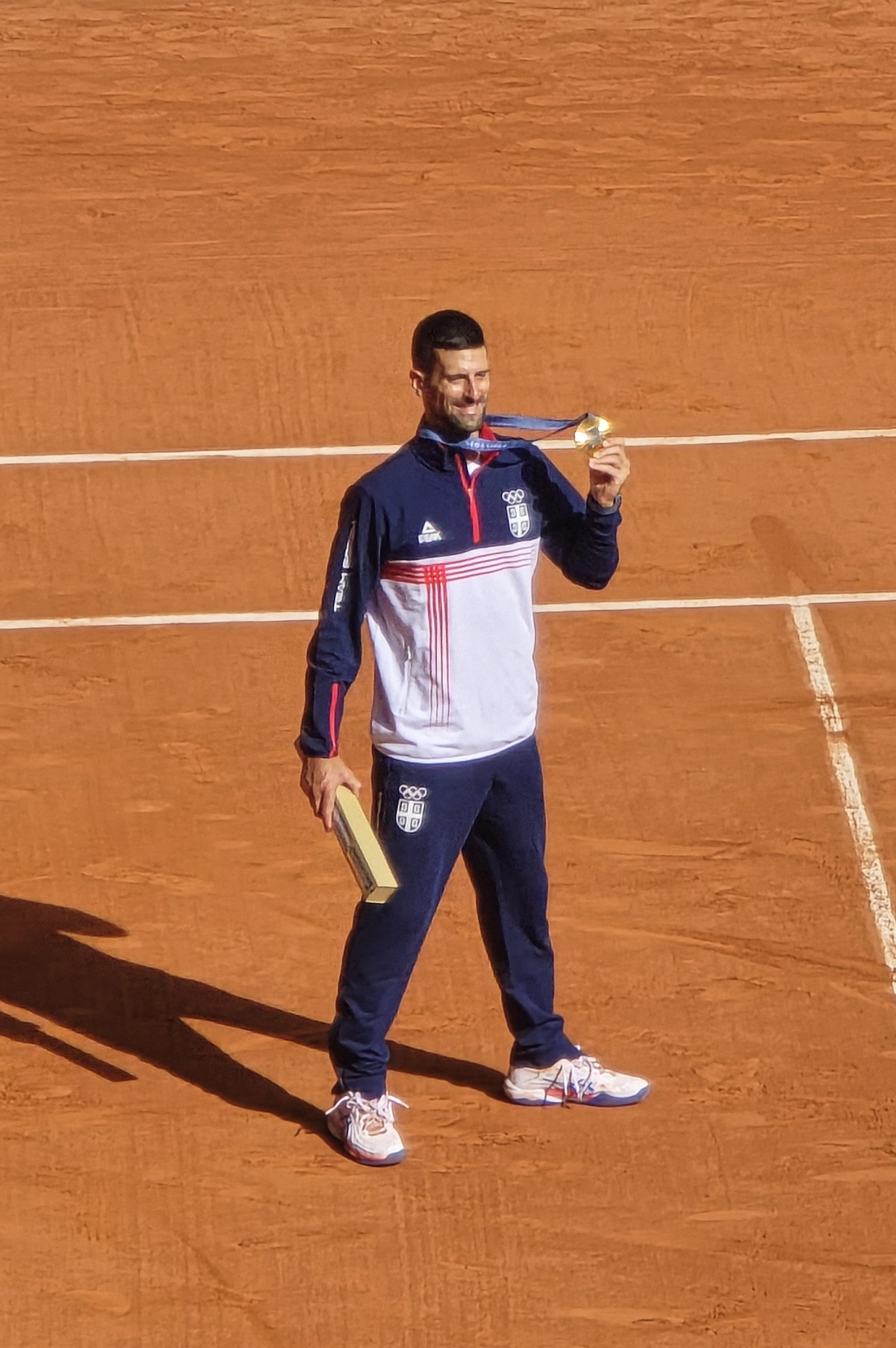
- Djokovic at the 2024 Summer Olympics
- Full name: Novak Djokovic
- Country: Serbia
- Calendar prize money: $4,421,915

Singles
- Season record: 37–9 (80.4%)
- Calendar titles: 1
- Year-end ranking: No. 7
- Ranking change from previous year: ▼6

Grand Slam & significant results
- Australian Open: SF
- French Open: QF
- Wimbledon: F
- US Open: 3R
- Other tournaments
- Tour Finals: A
- Olympic Games: W

Doubles
- Season record: 1–0
- Ranking change from previous year: Steady

Mixed doubles
- Season record: 1–0

Davis Cup
- Davis Cup: WG1

Injuries
- Injuries: right-knee injury

The 2024 Novak Djokovic tennis season, officially began on 31 December 2023, with the start of the 2024 United Cup, and ended 13 October 2024 after Djokovic was defeated by Sinner in the finals of the Shanghai Masters.

During this season, Djokovic:

- Became the oldest world No. 1 of all time (37 years, 18 days).
- Became the third player to accomplish the Career Golden Slam, the second to accomplish the Career Super Slam & the first to complete the career sweep of the Big Titles (Note: Winning all of the Big Titles over the course of a player's career.)
- Became the third player in the Open Era to win 1,100 tour-level matches, after Jimmy Connors and Roger Federer.
- Became the first player in history to reach the semifinals at 4 different Olympics.
- Became the oldest Olympic gold medalist in men's singles & reached the Olympics final for the first time in his career, surpassing his bronze medal win in 2008.
- Became first player to have 90 wins at each grand slam in open Era.
- Extended his record of 13 Olympic singles victories (previously tied with Federer) to 19.
- Extended his men's Open Era record of 405 weeks as world No. 1 to 428.
- Extended his men's Open Era record of 71 big titles to 72.
- Extended his record of 36 Grand Slam men's singles finals to 37.
- Extended his record of 47 Grand Slam men's singles semifinals to 49.
- Extended his record of 31 Grand slam first place seedings to 33.
- Extended his record of 76 Masters 1000 semifinals (previously tied with Nadal) to 78.
- Extended his record of 58 Masters 1000 finals to 59.
- Extended his Open Era record of 257 wins over top 10 ranked men's singles players to 259.
- Surpassed Roger Federer's record of 58 Grand Slam men's singles quarterfinals to 60.
- Surpassed Roger Federer's record of 369 career Grand Slam matches wins to 377.
- Surpassed Rafael Nadal and Roger Federer's record of most seasons with at least one major final made to 16.
- Equalled Nadal's record of 17 consecutive seasons of least one ATP Masters 1000 semifinal reached per season.
- Maintained his Open Era men's singles record of the highest career winning percentage (minimum 500 wins) at 83.51% (1124–222).

== Yearly summary ==
=== Early hard court season ===
==== United Cup ====
Djokovic represented Team Serbia in the United Cup. Serbia was drawn into Group E along with Team China and Team Czech Republic. Serbia registered a 2–1 win against China, with Djokovic winning against Zhizhen Zhang in his singles match, and in his doubles match, alongside teammate Olga Danilovic, against Zhang and Qinwen Zheng. Serbia then went on to defeat Czech Republic 2–1 as well, with Djokovic winning his singles match against Jiri Lehecka in three sets. Serbia topped Group E and reached the quarter finals.

But after the match against Lehecka, Djokovic raised injury concerns, claiming that he was struggling with an injury in his wrist. In the quarter final against hosts Team Australia, Djokovic lost to Alex De Minaur in straight sets, and struggled with his wrist again. Serbia lost to Australia 3-0 eventually, hence getting knocked out of the United Cup.

==== Australian Open ====
Djokovic reached the semi finals and lost to Jannik Sinner in four sets. It was his first ever loss in an Australian open semifinal or final (previously he was 10–0 in semifinals and 20–0 in semifinals and finals combined).

==== Indian Wells Open ====
Djokovic received a first round bye into the Indian Wells Open and defeated Aleksandar Vukic in three sets to open up his Indian Wells campaign. He was then defeated by lucky loser Luca Nardi ranked #123 in the world at the time, in three sets in the third round. This marked the lowest ranked opponent to ever beat Djokovic in any Masters 1000 tournament or Grand Slam event in his career.

=== Clay court season ===
==== Monte-Carlo Masters ====
Djokovic was upset in the semifinal 4–6, 6–1, 4–6 by Casper Ruud.

==== Italian Open ====
Djokovic was upset in the third round by Alejandro Tabilo, who won the match 6–2, 6–3 for his first ever win against Djokovic.

==== Geneva Open ====
Djokovic was upset in the semifinal 4–6, 6–0, 1–6 by Tomáš Macháč.

==== French Open ====
Djokovic withdrew from the French Open due to concerns over the meniscus injury in his right knee before the quarterfinal match against Casper Ruud.

=== Grass court season ===
==== Wimbledon ====
In the final, Djokovic faced Carlos Alcaraz. Djokovic was defeated by Carlos Alcaraz in straight sets 2–6, 2–6, 6–7^{(4–7)} to win his second Wimbledon.

=== Olympic Games ===
==== Paris 2024 Summer Olympics ====
Djokovic entered the 2024 Paris Olympics, defeating Matthew Ebden, Rafael Nadal, Dominik Koepfer, Stefanos Tsitsipas and Lorenzo Musetti to reach his first Olympic gold medal match. Djokovic then defeated Carlos Alcaraz in straight sets 7–6^{(7–3)}, 7–6^{(7–2)} to win the Olympic gold medal, in a two-hour fifty minute match characterized by no breaks of serve. With the win, he became the oldest Olympic champion in men's singles as well as the only player to complete a career sweep of the Big Titles, having achieved both the Career Super Slam and Career Golden Slam as part of this accomplishment. He did not lose a single set during the tournament.

=== Outdoor hard court season ===
==== US Open ====
After his second-round victory, Novak Djokovic reached his 90th win at this tournament over the course of his career, becoming the only tennis player to have 90 or more career wins at each of the four Grand Slam events. In the third round, he lost to Alexei Popyrin in four sets 4–6, 4–6, 6–2, 4–6 to end the season without a major title for only the second time since 2011 and the first since 2017.

=== Indoor hard court season ===
==== Shanghai Masters ====
In the final, Djokovic faced Jannik Sinner. Djokovic was defeated by Jannik Sinner in straight sets 6–7^{(4–7)}, 3–6.

==== ATP Finals ====
Djokovic also withdrew from the ATP Finals this year, citing an ongoing injury.

== All matches ==
This table chronicles all the matches of Novak Djokovic in 2024.

Key
W	F	SF	QF	#R	RR	Q#	P#	DNQ	A	Z#	PO	G	S	B	NMS	NTI	P	NH

(W) winner; (F) finalist; (SF) semifinalist; (QF) quarterfinalist; (#R) rounds 4, 3, 2, 1; (RR) round-robin stage; (Q#) qualification round; (P#) preliminary round; (DNQ) did not qualify; (A) absent; (Z#) Davis/Fed Cup Zonal Group (with number indication) or (PO) play-off; (G) gold, (S) silver or (B) bronze Olympic/Paralympic medal; (NMS) not a Masters tournament; (NTI) not a Tier I tournament; (P) postponed; (NH) not held; (SR) strike rate (events won / competed); (W–L) win–loss record.
To avoid confusion and double counting, these charts are updated at the conclusion of a tournament or when the player's participation has ended.

=== Singles matches ===
Tournament	Match	Round	Opponent (seed or key)	Rank	Result	Score
United Cup; Perth, Australia Hard; 29 December 2023 – 7 January 2024
United Cup; Perth, Australia Hard; 29 December 2023 – 7 January 2024	1 / 1301	RR	(China) Zhang Zhizhen	58	Win	6–3, 6–2
United Cup; Perth, Australia Hard; 29 December 2023 – 7 January 2024	2 / 1302	RR	(Czech Republic) Jiří Lehečka	31	Win	6–1, 6–7^{(2–7)}, 6–1
United Cup; Perth, Australia Hard; 29 December 2023 – 7 January 2024	3 / 1303	QF	(Australia) Alex de Minaur	12	Loss	4–6, 4–6
Australian Open; Melbourne, Australia; Grand Slam tournament Hard, outdoor 14 – 28 January 2024
Australian Open; Melbourne, Australia; Grand Slam tournament Hard, outdoor 14 – 28 January 2024	4 / 1304	1R	(Croatia) Dino Prižmić (Q)	187	Win	6–2, 6–7^{(5–7)}, 6–3, 6–4
Australian Open; Melbourne, Australia; Grand Slam tournament Hard, outdoor 14 – 28 January 2024	5 / 1305	2R	(Australia) Alexei Popyrin	43	Win	6–3, 4–6, 7–6^{(7–4)}, 6–3
Australian Open; Melbourne, Australia; Grand Slam tournament Hard, outdoor 14 – 28 January 2024	6 / 1306	3R	(Argentina) Tomás Martín Etcheverry (30)	32	Win	6–3, 6–3, 7–6^{(7–2)}
Australian Open; Melbourne, Australia; Grand Slam tournament Hard, outdoor 14 – 28 January 2024	7 / 1307	4R	(France) Adrian Mannarino (20)	19	Win	6–0, 6–0, 6–3
Australian Open; Melbourne, Australia; Grand Slam tournament Hard, outdoor 14 – 28 January 2024	8 / 1308	QF	(United States) Taylor Fritz (12)	12	Win	7–6^{(7–3)}, 4–6, 6–2, 6–3
Australian Open; Melbourne, Australia; Grand Slam tournament Hard, outdoor 14 – 28 January 2024	9 / 1309	SF	(Italy) Jannik Sinner (4)	4	Loss	1–6, 2–6, 7–6^{(8–6)}, 3–6
Indian Wells Open; Indian Wells, United States; ATP 1000; Hard, outdoor 6 – 17 March 2024
Indian Wells Open; Indian Wells, United States; ATP 1000; Hard, outdoor 6 – 17 March 2024	–	1R	Bye			
Indian Wells Open; Indian Wells, United States; ATP 1000; Hard, outdoor 6 – 17 March 2024	10 / 1310	2R	(Australia) Aleksandar Vukic	69	Win	6–2, 5–7, 6–3
Indian Wells Open; Indian Wells, United States; ATP 1000; Hard, outdoor 6 – 17 March 2024	11 / 1311	3R	(Italy) Luca Nardi (LL)	123	Loss	4–6, 6–3, 3–6
Miami Open; Miami Gardens, United States; ATP 1000; Hard, outdoor 20 – 31 March 2024
Miami Open; Miami Gardens, United States; ATP 1000; Hard, outdoor 20 – 31 March 2024	Withdrew					
Monte-Carlo Masters; Roquebrune-Cap-Martin, France; ATP 1000; Clay, outdoor 7 – 14 April 2024
Monte-Carlo Masters; Roquebrune-Cap-Martin, France; ATP 1000; Clay, outdoor 7 – 14 April 2024	–	1R	Bye			
Monte-Carlo Masters; Roquebrune-Cap-Martin, France; ATP 1000; Clay, outdoor 7 – 14 April 2024	12 / 1312	2R	Roman Safiullin (Note: Russian and Belarus players are not allowed to compete under the name or flag of their country following the Russian invasion of Ukraine.)	41	Win	6–1, 6–2
Monte-Carlo Masters; Roquebrune-Cap-Martin, France; ATP 1000; Clay, outdoor 7 – 14 April 2024	13 / 1313	3R	(Italy) Lorenzo Musetti	24	Win	7–5, 6–3
Monte-Carlo Masters; Roquebrune-Cap-Martin, France; ATP 1000; Clay, outdoor 7 – 14 April 2024	14 / 1314	QF	(Australia) Alex de Minaur (11)	11	Win	7–5, 6–4
Monte-Carlo Masters; Roquebrune-Cap-Martin, France; ATP 1000; Clay, outdoor 7 – 14 April 2024	15 / 1315	SF	(Norway) Casper Ruud (8)	10	Loss	4–6, 6–1, 4–6
Italian Open; Rome, Italy; ATP 1000; Clay, outdoor 8 – 19 May 2024
Italian Open; Rome, Italy; ATP 1000; Clay, outdoor 8 – 19 May 2024	–	1R	Bye			
Italian Open; Rome, Italy; ATP 1000; Clay, outdoor 8 – 19 May 2024	16 / 1316	2R	(France) Corentin Moutet (LL)	83	Win	6–3, 6–1
Italian Open; Rome, Italy; ATP 1000; Clay, outdoor 8 – 19 May 2024	17 / 1317	3R	(Chile) Alejandro Tabilo (29)	32	Loss	2–6, 3–6
Geneva Open; Geneva, Switzerland; ATP 250; Clay, outdoor 18 – 25 May 2024
Geneva Open; Geneva, Switzerland; ATP 250; Clay, outdoor 18 – 25 May 2024	–	1R	Bye			
Geneva Open; Geneva, Switzerland; ATP 250; Clay, outdoor 18 – 25 May 2024	18 / 1318	2R	(Germany) Yannick Hanfmann	85	Win	6–3, 6–3
Geneva Open; Geneva, Switzerland; ATP 250; Clay, outdoor 18 – 25 May 2024	19 / 1319	QF	(Netherlands) Tallon Griekspoor (6)	27	Win	7–5, 6–1
Geneva Open; Geneva, Switzerland; ATP 250; Clay, outdoor 18 – 25 May 2024	20 / 1320	SF	(Czech Republic) Tomáš Macháč	44	Loss	4–6, 6–0, 1–6
French Open; Paris, France; Grand Slam tournament Clay, outdoor 26 May – 9 June 2024
French Open; Paris, France; Grand Slam tournament Clay, outdoor 26 May – 9 June 2024	21 / 1321	1R	(France) Pierre-Hugues Herbert (WC)	142	Win	6–4, 7–6^{(7–3)}, 6–4
French Open; Paris, France; Grand Slam tournament Clay, outdoor 26 May – 9 June 2024	22 / 1322	2R	(Spain) Roberto Carballés Baena	63	Win	6–4, 6–1, 6–2
French Open; Paris, France; Grand Slam tournament Clay, outdoor 26 May – 9 June 2024	23 / 1323	3R	(Italy) Lorenzo Musetti (30)	30	Win	7–5, 6–7^{(6–8)}, 2–6, 6–3, 6–0
French Open; Paris, France; Grand Slam tournament Clay, outdoor 26 May – 9 June 2024	24 / 1324	4R	(Argentina) Francisco Cerúndolo (23)	27	Win	6–1, 5–7, 3–6, 7–5, 6–3
French Open; Paris, France; Grand Slam tournament Clay, outdoor 26 May – 9 June 2024	–	QF	(Norway) Casper Ruud (7)	7	Withdrew	N/A
Wimbledon; London, United Kingdom; Grand Slam tournament Grass, outdoor 1 – 14 July 2024
Wimbledon; London, United Kingdom; Grand Slam tournament Grass, outdoor 1 – 14 July 2024	25 / 1325	1R	(Czech Republic) Vít Kopřiva (Q)	123	Win	6–1, 6–2, 6–2
Wimbledon; London, United Kingdom; Grand Slam tournament Grass, outdoor 1 – 14 July 2024	26 / 1326	2R	(United Kingdom) Jacob Fearnley (WC)	277	Win	6–3, 6–4, 5–7, 7–5
Wimbledon; London, United Kingdom; Grand Slam tournament Grass, outdoor 1 – 14 July 2024	27 / 1327	3R	(Australia) Alexei Popyrin	47	Win	4–6, 6–3, 6–4, 7–6^{(7–3)}
Wimbledon; London, United Kingdom; Grand Slam tournament Grass, outdoor 1 – 14 July 2024	28 / 1328	4R	(Denmark) Holger Rune (15)	15	Win	6–3, 6–4, 6–2
Wimbledon; London, United Kingdom; Grand Slam tournament Grass, outdoor 1 – 14 July 2024	–	QF	(Australia) Alex de Minaur (9)	9	Walkover	N/A
Wimbledon; London, United Kingdom; Grand Slam tournament Grass, outdoor 1 – 14 July 2024	29 / 1329	SF	(Italy) Lorenzo Musetti (25)	25	Win	6–4, 7–6^{(7–2)}, 6–4
Wimbledon; London, United Kingdom; Grand Slam tournament Grass, outdoor 1 – 14 July 2024	30 / 1330	F	(Spain) Carlos Alcaraz (3)	3	Loss (1)	2–6, 2–6, 6–7^{(4–7)}
Summer Olympics; Paris, France; Olympics; Clay, outdoor 27 July – 4 August 2024
Summer Olympics; Paris, France; Olympics; Clay, outdoor 27 July – 4 August 2024	31 / 1331	1R	(Australia) Matthew Ebden (Alt)	–	Win	6–0, 6–1
Summer Olympics; Paris, France; Olympics; Clay, outdoor 27 July – 4 August 2024	32 / 1332	2R	(Spain) Rafael Nadal (PR)	161	Win	6–1, 6–4
Summer Olympics; Paris, France; Olympics; Clay, outdoor 27 July – 4 August 2024	33 / 1333	3R	(Germany) Dominik Koepfer	70	Win	7–5, 6–3
Summer Olympics; Paris, France; Olympics; Clay, outdoor 27 July – 4 August 2024	34 / 1334	QF	(Greece) Stefanos Tsitsipas (8)	11	Win	6–3, 7–6^{(7–3)}
Summer Olympics; Paris, France; Olympics; Clay, outdoor 27 July – 4 August 2024	35 / 1335	SF	(Italy) Lorenzo Musetti (11)	16	Win	6–4, 6–2
Summer Olympics; Paris, France; Olympics; Clay, outdoor 27 July – 4 August 2024	36 / 1336	F	(Spain) Carlos Alcaraz (2)	3	Win (1)	7–6^{(7–3)}, 7–6^{(7–2)}
Canadian Open; Montreal, Canada; ATP 1000; Hard, outdoor 6 – 12 August 2024
Canadian Open; Montreal, Canada; ATP 1000; Hard, outdoor 6 – 12 August 2024	Withdrew					
Cincinnati Open; Cincinnati, United States; ATP 1000; Hard, outdoor 12 – 19 August 2024
Cincinnati Open; Cincinnati, United States; ATP 1000; Hard, outdoor 12 – 19 August 2024	Withdrew					
US Open; New York City, United States; Grand Slam tournament Hard, outdoor 26 August – 8 September 2024
US Open; New York City, United States; Grand Slam tournament Hard, outdoor 26 August – 8 September 2024	37 / 1337	1R	(Moldova) Radu Albot (Q)	138	Win	6–2, 6–2, 6–4
US Open; New York City, United States; Grand Slam tournament Hard, outdoor 26 August – 8 September 2024	38 / 1338	2R	(Serbia) Laslo Djere	109	Win	6–4, 6–4, 2–0 Ret.
US Open; New York City, United States; Grand Slam tournament Hard, outdoor 26 August – 8 September 2024	39 / 1339	3R	(Australia) Alexei Popyrin (28)	28	Loss	4–6, 4–6, 6–2, 4–6
Davis Cup World Group; Belgrade, Serbia; Davis Cup; Hard, indoor 14 – 15 September 2024
Davis Cup World Group; Belgrade, Serbia; Davis Cup; Hard, indoor 14 – 15 September 2024	40 / 1340	RR	(Greece) Ioannis Xilas	770	Win	6–0, 6–1
Shanghai Masters; Shanghai, China; ATP 1000; Hard, outdoor 2 – 13 October 2024
Shanghai Masters; Shanghai, China; ATP 1000; Hard, outdoor 2 – 13 October 2024	–	1R	Bye			
Shanghai Masters; Shanghai, China; ATP 1000; Hard, outdoor 2 – 13 October 2024	41 / 1341	2R	(United States) Alex Michelsen	43	Win	7–6^{(7–3)}, 7–6^{(11–9)}
Shanghai Masters; Shanghai, China; ATP 1000; Hard, outdoor 2 – 13 October 2024	42 / 1342	3R	(Italy) Flavio Cobolli (28)	30	Win	6–1, 6–2
Shanghai Masters; Shanghai, China; ATP 1000; Hard, outdoor 2 – 13 October 2024	43 / 1343	4R	Roman Safiullin	61	Win	6–3, 6–2
Shanghai Masters; Shanghai, China; ATP 1000; Hard, outdoor 2 – 13 October 2024	44 / 1344	QF	(Czech Republic) Jakub Menšík	65	Win	6–7^{(4–7)}, 6–1, 6–4
Shanghai Masters; Shanghai, China; ATP 1000; Hard, outdoor 2 – 13 October 2024	45 / 1345	SF	(United States) Taylor Fritz (7)	7	Win	6–4, 7–6^{(8–6)}
Shanghai Masters; Shanghai, China; ATP 1000; Hard, outdoor 2 – 13 October 2024	46 / 1346	F	(Italy) Jannik Sinner (1)	1	Loss (2)	6–7^{(4–7)}, 3–6
Paris Masters; Paris, France; ATP 1000; Hard, indoor 28 October – 3 November 2024
Paris Masters; Paris, France; ATP 1000; Hard, indoor 28 October – 3 November 2024	Withdrew					
ATP Finals; Turin, Italy; ATP Finals; Hard, indoor 10 – 17 November 2024
ATP Finals; Turin, Italy; ATP Finals; Hard, indoor 10 – 17 November 2024	Withdrew					

=== Doubles matches ===
Tournament	Match	Round	Opponent (seed or key)	Rank	Result	Score
Davis Cup World Group; Belgrade, Serbia; Davis Cup; Hard, indoor 14 – 15 September 2024; Partner: (Serbia) Hamad Medjedovic
Davis Cup World Group; Belgrade, Serbia; Davis Cup; Hard, indoor 14 – 15 September 2024; Partner: (Serbia) Hamad Medjedovic	1 / 144	RR	(Greece) Aristotelis Thanos / (Greece) Petros Tsitsipas	1263 / 77	Win	6–3, 3–6, 6–3

=== Mixed doubles matches ===
Tournament	Match	Round	Opponent (seed or key)	Rank	Result	Score
United Cup; Perth, Australia Hard; 29 December 2023 – 7 January 2024; Partner: (Serbia) Olga Danilović
United Cup; Perth, Australia Hard; 29 December 2023 – 7 January 2024; Partner: (Serbia) Olga Danilović	1 / 4	RR	(China) Zheng Qinwen / (China) Zhang Zhizhen	– / 627	Win	6–4, 1–6, [10–6]

== Exhibition matches ==
=== Singles ===
Tournament	Match	Round	Opponent (seed or key)	Rank	Result	Score
Riyadh Season Tennis Cup; Riyadh, Saudi Arabia Hard, outdoor 27 December 2023
Riyadh Season Tennis Cup; Riyadh, Saudi Arabia Hard, outdoor 27 December 2023	1	PO	(Spain) Carlos Alcaraz	2	Loss	6–4, 4–6, 4–6
Australian Open Opening Week; Melbourne, Australia Hard, outdoor 11 January 2024
Australian Open Opening Week; Melbourne, Australia Hard, outdoor 11 January 2024	2	PO	(Greece) Stefanos Tsitsipas	7	Win	6–3
Giorgio Armani Tennis Classic; London, United Kingdom Grass, outdoor 28 June 2024
Giorgio Armani Tennis Classic; London, United Kingdom Grass, outdoor 28 June 2024	3	PO	Daniil Medvedev	5	Win	6–3, 6–4
Grigor Dimitrov Foundation; Sofia, Bulgaria Hard, indoor 17 September 2024
Grigor Dimitrov Foundation; Sofia, Bulgaria Hard, indoor 17 September 2024	4	PO	(Bulgaria) Grigor Dimitrov	10	Loss	4–6, 6–2, [6–10]
6 Kings Slam; Riyadh, Saudi Arabia Hard, outdoor 16 – 19 October 2024
6 Kings Slam; Riyadh, Saudi Arabia Hard, outdoor 16 – 19 October 2024	5	SF	(Italy) Jannik Sinner	1	Loss	2–6, 7–6^{(7–0)}, 4–6
6 Kings Slam; Riyadh, Saudi Arabia Hard, outdoor 16 – 19 October 2024	6	3rd Place	(Spain) Rafael Nadal	153	Win	6–2, 7–6^{(7–5)}
El Último Desafío; Buenos Aires, Argentina Hard, outdoor 1 December 2024
El Último Desafío; Buenos Aires, Argentina Hard, outdoor 1 December 2024	7	PO	(Argentina) Juan Martín del Potro	–	Loss	4–6, 5–7

=== Doubles ===
Tournament	Match	Round	Opponent (seed or key)	Rank	Result	Score
The Fan Week Exhibition; New York City, United States Hard; 21 August 2024; Partner: (United States) John McEnroe
The Fan Week Exhibition; New York City, United States Hard; 21 August 2024; Partner: (United States) John McEnroe	1	PO	(Spain) Carlos Alcaraz / (United States) Andre Agassi	– / –	Win	[10–8]

=== Mixed Doubles ===
Tournament	Match	Round	Opponent (seed or key)	Rank	Result	Score
El Último Desafío; Buenos Aires, Argentina Hard; 1 December 2024; Partner: (Argentina) Gisela Dulko
El Último Desafío; Buenos Aires, Argentina Hard; 1 December 2024; Partner: (Argentina) Gisela Dulko	1	PO	(Argentina) Gabriela Sabatini / (Argentina) Juan Martín del Potro	– / –	Loss	1–2

== Schedule ==
Per Novak Djokovic, this is his current 2024 schedule (subject to change).

=== Singles schedule ===
Date	Tournament	Location	Tier	Surface	Prev. result	Prev. points	New points	Result
1 January 2024– 7 January 2024	United Cup	Perth/Sydney (AUS)	United Cup	Hard	N/A	0	60	Quarterfinals ( Serbia lost to Australia, 0–3)
8 January 2024– 14 January 2024	Adelaide International	Adelaide (AUS)	250 Series	Hard	W	250	0	Withdrew
14 January 2024– 28 January 2024	Australian Open	Melbourne (AUS)	Grand Slam	Hard	W	2000	800	Semifinals (lost to Jannik Sinner, 1–6, 2–6, 7–6^{(8–6)}, 3–6)
26 February 2024– 2 March 2024	Dubai Tennis Championships	Dubai (UAE)	500 Series	Hard	SF	180	0	Withdrew
6 March 2024– 17 March 2024	Indian Wells Open	Indian Wells (USA)	Masters 1000	Hard	N/A	0	50	Third round (lost to Luca Nardi, 4–6, 6–3, 3–6)
N/A	Srpska Open	Banja Luka (BIH)	250 Series	Clay	QF	45	0	Not Held
7 April 2024– 14 April 2024	Monte-Carlo Masters	Roquebrune-Cap-Martin (FRA)	Masters 1000	Clay	3R	90	400	Semifinals (lost to Casper Ruud, 4–6, 6–1, 4–6)
8 May 2024– 19 May 2024	Italian Open	Rome (ITA)	Masters 1000	Clay	QF	180	50	Third round (lost to Alejandro Tabilo, 2–6, 3–6)
20 May 2024– 26 May 2024	Geneva Open	Geneva (SUI)	250 Series	Clay	N/A	0	100	Semifinals (lost to Tomáš Macháč, 4–6, 6–0, 1–6)
26 May 2024– 9 June 2024	French Open	Paris (FRA)	Grand Slam	Clay	W	2000	400	Quarterfinals (withdrew to Casper Ruud, due to a right knee injury)
1 July 2024– 14 July 2024	Wimbledon	London (UK)	Grand Slam	Grass	F	1200	1300	Final (lost to Carlos Alcaraz, 2–6, 2–6, 6–7^{(4–7)})
26 July 2024– 11 August 2024	Summer Olympics	Paris (FRA)	Olympic Games	Clay	NH	N/A	N/A	Champion (defeated Carlos Alcaraz, 7–6^{(7–3)}, 7–6^{(7–2)})
6 August 2024– 12 August 2024	Canadian Open	Montreal (CAN)	Masters 1000	Hard	A	0	0	Withdrew
12 August 2024– 19 August 2024	Cincinnati Open	Cincinnati (USA)	Masters 1000	Hard	W	1000	0	Withdrew
26 August 2024– 8 September 2024	US Open	New York (USA)	Grand Slam	Hard	W	2000	100	Third round (lost to Alexei Popyrin, 4–6, 4–6, 6–2, 4–6)
14 September 2024– 15 September 2024	Davis Cup World Group	Belgrade (SRB)	Davis Cup	Hard (i)	N/A	N/A	N/A	Progressed to Qualifiers second Round
2 October 2024– 13 October 2024	Shanghai Masters	Shanghai (CHN)	Masters 1000	Hard	N/A	0	650	Final (lost to Jannik Sinner, 6–7^{(4–7)}, 3–6)
28 October 2024– 3 November 2024	Paris Masters	Paris (FRA)	Masters 1000	Hard (i)	W	1000	0	Withdrew
10 November 2024– 17 November 2024	ATP Finals	Turin (ITA)	Tour Finals	Hard (i)	W	1300	0	Withdrew
Total year-end points						11245	3910	▼7335 difference

== Yearly records ==
=== Head-to-head matchups ===
Novak Djokovic has a 37–9 (80.43%) ATP match win–loss record in the 2024 season. His record against players who were part of the ATP rankings Top Ten at the time of their meetings is 2–4 (33.33%). Bold indicates player was ranked top 10 at the time of at least one meeting. The following list is ordered by number of wins:

- (Italy) Lorenzo Musetti 4–0
- Roman Safiullin 2–0
- (Australia) Alexei Popyrin 2–1
- (United States) **Taylor Fritz** 2–0
- (Moldova) Radu Albot 1–0
- (Spain) Roberto Carballés Baena 1–0
- (Argentina) Francisco Cerúndolo 1–0
- (Italy) Flavio Cobolli 1–0
- (Serbia) Laslo Djere 1–0
- (Australia) Matthew Ebden 1–0
- (Argentina) Tomás Martín Etcheverry 1–0
- (United Kingdom) Jacob Fearnley 1–0
- (Netherlands) Tallon Griekspoor 1–0
- (Germany) Yannick Hanfmann 1–0
- (France) Pierre-Hugues Herbert 1–0
- (Germany) Dominik Koepfer 1–0
- (Czech Republic) Vít Kopřiva 1–0
- (Czech Republic) Jiří Lehečka 1–0
- (France) Adrian Mannarino 1–0
- (Czech Republic) Jakub Menšík 1–0
- (United States) Alex Michelsen 1–0
- (France) Corentin Moutet 1–0
- (Spain) Rafael Nadal 1–0
- (Croatia) Dino Prižmić 1–0
- (Denmark) Holger Rune 1–0
- (Greece) Stefanos Tsitsipas 1–0
- (Australia) Aleksandar Vukic 1–0
- (Greece) Ioannis Xilas 1–0
- (China) Zhang Zhizhen 1–0
- (Spain) **Carlos Alcaraz** 1–1
- (Australia) Alex de Minaur 1–1
- (Czech Republic) Tomáš Macháč 0–1
- (Italy) Luca Nardi 0–1
- (Norway) **Casper Ruud** 0–1
- (Chile) Alejandro Tabilo 0–1
- (Italy) **Jannik Sinner** 0–2

* Statistics correct as of 13 October 2024.

=== Top 10 record (2–4) ===
Category Grand Slam (0–2) Olympic Games (1–0) ATP Finals (0–0) Masters 1000 (1–2) 500 Series (0–0) 250 Series (0–0)	Wins by surface Hard (1–2) Clay (1–1) Grass (0–1)	Wins by setting Outdoor (2–4) Indoor (0–0)

Result	W–L	Player	Rk	Event	Surface	Rd	Score	Rk	Ref
Loss	0–1	(Italy) Jannik Sinner	4	Australian Open, Australia	Hard	SF	1–6, 2–6, 7–6^{(8–6)}, 3–6	**1**	
Loss	0–2	(Norway) Casper Ruud	10	Monte-Carlo Masters, France	Clay	SF	4–6, 6–1, 4–6	**1**	
Loss	0–3	(Spain) Carlos Alcaraz	3	Wimbledon, United Kingdom	Grass	F	2–6, 2–6, 6–7^{(4–7)}	2	
Win	1–3	(Spain) Carlos Alcaraz	3	Summer Olympics, France	Clay	F	7–6^{(7–3)}, 7–6^{(7–2)}	2	
Win	2–3	(United States) Taylor Fritz	7	Shanghai Masters, China	Hard	SF	6–4, 7–6^{(8–6)}	4	
Loss	2–4	(Italy) Jannik Sinner	**1**	Shanghai Masters, China	Hard	F	6–7^{(4–7)}, 3–6	4	

- Key: (Rk) first use, opponent rank; (Rd) round; (Rk) 2nd use, player rank; (Ref) reference; (F) final; (SF) semifinal; (QF) quarterfinal; (#R) rounds 4, 3, 2, 1; (RR) round-robin stage; (Q#) qualifying rounds or stages (3), 2, 1.

=== Finals ===
==== Singles: 3 (1 title, 2 runner-up) ====
Category Grand Slam (0–1) ATP Finals (0–0) ATP Masters 1000 (0–1) Olympics (1–0) ATP 500 Series (0–0) ATP 250 Series (0–0)	Titles by surface Hard (0–1) Clay (1–0) Grass (0–1)	Titles by setting Outdoor (1–2) Indoor (0–0)

Result	W–L	Date	Tournament	Tier	Surface	Opponent	Score
Loss	0–1	Jul 2024	Wimbledon, Great Britain	Grand Slam	Grass	(Spain) Carlos Alcaraz	2–6, 2–6, 6–7^{(4–7)}
Win	1–1	Aug 2024	Summer Olympics, France	Olympics	Clay	(Spain) Carlos Alcaraz	7–6^{(7–3)}, 7–6^{(7–2)}
Loss	1–2	Oct 2024	Shanghai Masters, China	Masters 1000	Hard	(Italy) Jannik Sinner	6–7^{(4–7)}, 3–6

== Earnings ==
Singles
Event	Prize money	Year-to-date
United Cup	$293,850	$293,850
Australian Open	A$990,000	$955,665
Indian Wells Open	$59,100	$1,014,765
Monte-Carlo Masters	€274,425	$1,312,104
Italian Open	€51,665	$1,367,706
Geneva Open	€30,220	$1,400,552
French Open	€415,000	$1,851,615
Wimbledon Championships	£1,400,000	$3,621,915
US Open	$215,000	$3,836,915
Shanghai Masters	$585,000	$4,421,915
		$4,421,915
Total
		$4,421,915

Figures in United States dollars (USD) unless noted.

- source：2024 Singles Activity
- source：2024 Doubles Activity

== See also ==
- 2024 ATP Tour
- 2024 Daniil Medvedev tennis season
- 2024 Carlos Alcaraz tennis season
- 2024 Jannik Sinner tennis season
