= 2019 Swedish Open – Men's doubles =

Men's doubles
- 2019 Swedish Open

Final
- Champions: (Belgium) Sander Gillé (Belgium) Joran Vliegen
- Runners-up: (Argentina) Federico Delbonis (Argentina) Horacio Zeballos
- Score: 6–7^{(5–7)}, 7–5, [10–5]

Events
Singles	men	women
Doubles	men	women
← 2018 ·	Swedish Open	· 2021 →

Julio Peralta and Horacio Zeballos were the defending champions, but Peralta chose not to participate this year. Zeballos played alongside Federico Delbonis, but lost to Sander Gillé and Joran Vliegen in the final, 7–6^{(7–5)}, 5–7, [5–10].

== Seeds ==
1. (Czech Republic) Roman Jebavý / (Netherlands) Matwé Middelkoop (semifinals)
2. (Brazil) Marcelo Demoliner / (Chile) Nicolás Jarry (quarterfinals)
3. (Argentina) Federico Delbonis / (Argentina) Horacio Zeballos (final)
4. (Chinese Taipei) Hsieh Cheng-peng / (Indonesia) Christopher Rungkat (first round)

== Draw ==
=== Key ===
- Q = Qualifier
- WC = Wild card
- LL = Lucky loser
- Alt = Alternate
- ITF = ITF entry
- PR = Protected ranking
- SR = Special ranking
- SE = Special exempt
- JE = Junior exempt
- JR = Junior Accelerator Programme entrant
- CO = College Accelerator Programme entrant
- NG = Next Gen Accelerator Program entrant
- w/o = Walkover
- r = Retired
- d = Defaulted

=== Draw ===
First round
1	(Czech Republic) R Jebavý (Netherlands) M Middelkoop	6	6
(Bolivia) H Dellien (Argentina) JI Londero	3	3
(Spain) R Carballés Baena (Spain) J Munar	7	6
(United States) J Cerretani (Brazil) F Romboli	5	2
4	(Chinese Taipei) C-p Hsieh (Indonesia) C Rungkat	1	4
PR	(Philippines) T Huey (Denmark) F Nielsen	6	6
(Belgium) S Gillé (Belgium) J Vliegen	6^{5}	7^{7}	[10]
(Netherlands) S Arends (Netherlands) D Pel	7^{7}	6^{2}	[5]
WC	(Sweden) M Eriksson (Sweden) A Göransson	5	7	[10]
WC	(Sweden) E Ymer (Sweden) M Ymer	7	5	[6]
(Chile) C Garín (Spain) D Vega Hernández	5	6^{3}
3	(Argentina) F Delbonis (Argentina) H Zeballos	7^{7}	7^{7}
(Spain) P Carreño Busta (Portugal) J Sousa	7^{7}	6
(Monaco) R Arneodo (Bosnia and Herzegovina) D Džumhur	6^{4}	2
(Uruguay) P Cuevas (Argentina) G Durán	4	6	[7]
2	(Brazil) M Demoliner (Chile) N Jarry	6	4	[10]

Quarterfinals
1	(Czech Republic) R Jebavý (Netherlands) M Middelkoop	6	6
(Spain) R Carballés Baena (Spain) J Munar	3	4
PR	(Philippines) T Huey (Denmark) F Nielsen	2	3
(Belgium) S Gillé (Belgium) J Vliegen	6	6
WC	(Sweden) M Eriksson (Sweden) A Göransson	1	1
3	(Argentina) F Delbonis (Argentina) H Zeballos	6	6
(Spain) P Carreño Busta (Portugal) J Sousa	7	7
2	(Brazil) M Demoliner (Chile) N Jarry	5	5

Semifinals
1	(Czech Republic) R Jebavý (Netherlands) M Middelkoop	6	4	[5]
(Belgium) S Gillé (Belgium) J Vliegen	4	6	[10]
3	(Argentina) F Delbonis (Argentina) H Zeballos	3	6	[10]
(Spain) P Carreño Busta (Portugal) J Sousa	6	1	[5]

Final
(Belgium) S Gillé (Belgium) J Vliegen	6^{5}	7	[10]
3	(Argentina) F Delbonis (Argentina) H Zeballos	7^{7}	5	[5]
