= 2023 Chile Open – Singles =

Singles
- 2023 Chile Open

Final
- Champion: (Chile) Nicolás Jarry
- Runner-up: (Argentina) Tomás Martín Etcheverry
- Score: 6–7^{(5–7)}, 7–6^{(7–5)}, 6–2

Details
- Draw: 28 (4 Q / 3 WC )
- Seeds: 8

Events
Singles	Doubles
- Chile Open

Nicolás Jarry defeated Tomás Martín Etcheverry in the final, 6–7^{(5–7)}, 7–6^{(7–5)}, 6–2 to win the singles tennis title at the 2023 Chile Open. This was Jarry's first ATP title since 2019.

Pedro Martínez was the defending champion, but lost in the first round to Yannick Hanfmann.

== Seeds ==
The top four seeds received a bye into the second round.

1. (Italy) Lorenzo Musetti (second round)
2. (Argentina) Francisco Cerúndolo (second round)
3. (Argentina) Sebastián Báez (semifinals)
4. (Argentina) Diego Schwartzman (second round)
5. (Spain) Albert Ramos Viñolas (first round)
6. (Serbia) Laslo Đere (quarterfinals)
7. (Argentina) Pedro Cachin (first round)
8. (Spain) Bernabé Zapata Miralles (withdrew)

== Draw ==
Key

- Q = Qualifier
- WC = Wild card
- LL = Lucky loser
- Alt = Alternate
- ITF = ITF entry
- PR = Protected ranking
- SR = Special ranking
- SE = Special exempt
- JE = Junior exempt
- JR = Junior Accelerator Programme entrant
- CO = College Accelerator Programme entrant
- NG = Next Gen Accelerator Program entrant
- w/o = Walkover
- r = Retired
- d = Defaulted

=== Finals ===
Semifinals
(Spain) Jaume Munar	6	6^{4}	1
SE	(Chile) Nicolás Jarry	1	7^{7}	6
3	(Argentina) Sebastián Báez	5	3
(Argentina) Tomás Martín Etcheverry	7	6

Final
SE	(Chile) Nicolás Jarry	6^{5}	7^{7}	6
(Argentina) Tomás Martín Etcheverry	7^{7}	6^{5}	2

=== Top half ===
First round
WC	(Chile) A Tabilo	0	7^{7}	6^{5}
(Spain) J Munar	6	6^{4}	7^{7}
(Argentina) F Bagnis	2	6	6^{3}
(Italy) M Cecchinato	6	3	7^{7}
(Brazil) T Monteiro	7	4	7
5	(Spain) A Ramos Viñolas	5	6	5
SE	(Chile) N Jarry	7^{7}	6
(Peru) JP Varillas	6^{1}	4
(Spain) P Martínez	2	0
Q	(Germany) Y Hanfmann	6	6
(Spain) R Carballés Baena	6	0
LL	(Spain) C Taberner	1	0^{r}

Second round
1	(Italy) L Musetti	4	4
(Spain) J Munar	6	6
(Italy) M Cecchinato	6	3	2
(Brazil) T Monteiro	3	6	6
4	(Argentina) D Schwartzman	4	6	6^{2}
SE	(Chile) N Jarry	6	4	7^{7}
Q	(Germany) Y Hanfmann	7^{8}	6
(Spain) R Carballés Baena	6^{6}	2

Quarterfinals
(Spain) J Munar	6	3	6
(Brazil) T Monteiro	3	6	2
SE	(Chile) N Jarry	3	6	6
Q	(Germany) Y Hanfmann	6	3	4

Semifinals
(Spain) J Munar	6	6^{4}	1
SE	(Chile) N Jarry	1	7^{7}	6

=== Bottom half ===
First round
6	(Serbia) L Đere	6	6
(Portugal) J Sousa	3	2
Q	(Italy) R Bonadio	6	7^{7}
(Colombia) DE Galán	3	6^{5}
WC	(Austria) D Thiem	2	6^{2}
WC	(Chile) C Garín	6	7^{7}
7	(Argentina) P Cachin	4	6	3
Q	(Argentina) JM Cerúndolo	6	3	6
Q	(Argentina) C Ugo Carabelli	1	3
(Serbia) D Lajović	6	6
(Italy) F Fognini	1	6^{1}
(Argentina) TM Etcheverry	6	7^{7}

Second round
6	(Serbia) L Đere	7	7
Q	(Italy) R Bonadio	5	5
WC	(Chile) C Garín	4	3
3	(Argentina) S Báez	6	6
Q	(Argentina) JM Cerúndolo	2	6	6^{2}
(Serbia) D Lajović	6	2	7^{7}
(Argentina) TM Etcheverry	6	3	6
2	(Argentina) F Cerúndolo	3	6	3

Quarterfinals
6	(Serbia) L Đere	6^{4}	4
3	(Argentina) S Báez	7^{7}	6
(Serbia) D Lajović	1	2
(Argentina) TM Etcheverry	6	6

Semifinals
3	(Argentina) S Báez	5	3
(Argentina) TM Etcheverry	7	6

== Qualifying ==
=== Seeds ===
1. (France) Hugo Gaston (first round)
2. (Argentina) Juan Manuel Cerúndolo (qualified)
3. (Argentina) Camilo Ugo Carabelli (qualified)
4. (Germany) Yannick Hanfmann (qualified)
5. (Slovakia) Jozef Kovalík (first round)
6. (Brazil) Felipe Meligeni Alves (first round)
7. (Italy) Franco Agamenone (first round)
8. (Italy) Riccardo Bonadio (qualified)

=== Qualifiers ===
1. (Italy) Riccardo Bonadio
2. (Argentina) Juan Manuel Cerúndolo
3. (Argentina) Camilo Ugo Carabelli
4. (Germany) Yannick Hanfmann

=== Lucky loser ===
1. (Spain) Carlos Taberner

=== Qualifying draw ===
==== First qualifier ====
First round
1	(France) Hugo Gaston	6^{10}	5
(Argentina) Renzo Olivo	7^{12}	7
WC	(Chile) Gonzalo Lama	3	0^{r}
8/Alt	(Italy) Riccardo Bonadio	6	2

Qualifying competition
(Argentina) Renzo Olivo	4	2
8/Alt	(Italy) Riccardo Bonadio	6	6

==== Second qualifier ====
First round
2	(Argentina) Juan Manuel Cerúndolo	1	6	7
Alt	(Chile) Tomás Barrios Vera	6	3	5
(Argentina) Federico Delbonis	6	6
6	(Brazil) Felipe Meligeni Alves	4	2

Qualifying competition
2	(Argentina) Juan Manuel Cerúndolo	6	6
(Argentina) Federico Delbonis	4	4

==== Third qualifier ====
First round
3	(Argentina) Camilo Ugo Carabelli	6	6
Alt	(Argentina) Facundo Díaz Acosta	4	4
WC	(Brazil) Thiago Seyboth Wild	6	4	6
7	(Italy) Franco Agamenone	3	6	4

Qualifying competition
3	(Argentina) Camilo Ugo Carabelli	1	6	6
WC	(Brazil) Thiago Seyboth Wild	6	1	1

==== Fourth qualifier ====
First round
4	(Germany) Yannick Hanfmann	6	6
(Italy) Andrea Pellegrino	1	1
(Spain) Carlos Taberner	7	3	6
5	(Slovakia) Jozef Kovalík	5	6	4

Qualifying competition
4	(Germany) Yannick Hanfmann	6	6
(Spain) Carlos Taberner	4	1
