= 2019 Swedish Open – Women's doubles =

Women's doubles
- 2019 Swedish Open

Final
- Champions: (Japan) Misaki Doi (Russia) Natalia Vikhlyantseva
- Runners-up: (Chile) Alexa Guarachi (Montenegro) Danka Kovinić
- Score: 7–5, 6–7^{(4–7)}, [10–7]

Events
Singles	men	women
Doubles	men	women
- Swedish Open

Quirine Lemoine and Arantxa Rus were the defending champions from the last time the tournament was held in 2017, but Lemoine chose not to participate this year. Rus played alongside Akgul Amanmuradova, but the pair lost in the first round to Elena Bogdan and Rosalie van der Hoek.

Misaki Doi and Natalia Vikhlyantseva won the title, defeating Alexa Guarachi and Danka Kovinić in the final, 7–5, 6–7^{(4–7)}, [10–7].

== Seeds ==
1. (Spain) Lara Arruabarrena / (Sweden) Johanna Larsson (first round)
2. (Chile) Alexa Guarachi / (Montenegro) Danka Kovinić (final)
3. (Germany) Mona Barthel / (Switzerland) Xenia Knoll (quarterfinals)
4. (Sweden) Cornelia Lister / (Czech Republic) Renata Voráčová (semifinals)

== Draw ==
Key

- Q = Qualifier
- WC = Wild card
- LL = Lucky loser
- Alt = Alternate
- ITF = ITF entry
- PR = Protected ranking
- SR = Special ranking
- SE = Special exempt
- JE = Junior exempt
- JR = Junior Accelerator Programme entrant
- CO = College Accelerator Programme entrant
- NG = Next Gen Accelerator Program entrant
- w/o = Walkover
- r = Retired
- d = Defaulted

=== Draw ===
First round
1	(Spain) L Arruabarrena (Sweden) J Larsson	4	6	[7]
(Australia) A Bai (France) E Lechemia	6	3	[10]
(New Zealand) E Routliffe (Japan) E Shibahara	6	3	[8]
(Japan) M Doi (Russia) N Vikhlyantseva	0	6	[10]
4	(Sweden) C Lister (Czech Republic) R Voráčová	4	6	[10]
(Venezuela) A Gámiz (Argentina) P Ormaechea	6	4	[6]
(Russia) N Dzalamidze (Poland) P Kania	5	6	[7]
(Indonesia) B Gumulya (Indonesia) J Rompies	7	2	[10]
(Uzbekistan) A Amanmuradova (Netherlands) A Rus	4	3
(Romania) E Bogdan (Netherlands) R van der Hoek	6	6
WC	(Sweden) C Hennemann (Sweden) F Östlund	3	1
3	(Germany) M Barthel (Switzerland) X Knoll	6	6
(France) F Ferro (Hungary) D Gálfi	0	4
(Italy) G Marchetti (Brazil) L Pigossi	6	6
(Russia) A Fomina (Croatia) T Mrdeža	2	2
2	(Chile) A Guarachi (Montenegro) D Kovinić	6	6

Quarterfinals
(Australia) A Bai (France) E Lechemia	6	6^{4}	[9]
(Japan) M Doi (Russia) N Vikhlyantseva	4	7^{7}	[11]
4	(Sweden) C Lister (Czech Republic) R Voráčová	4	6	[11]
(Indonesia) B Gumulya (Indonesia) J Rompies	6	3	[9]
(Romania) E Bogdan (Netherlands) R van der Hoek	7	3	[10]
3	(Germany) M Barthel (Switzerland) X Knoll	5	6	[8]
(Italy) G Marchetti (Brazil) L Pigossi	3	7	[7]
2	(Chile) A Guarachi (Montenegro) D Kovinić	6	5	[10]

Semifinals
(Japan) M Doi (Russia) N Vikhlyantseva	7^{7}	6
4	(Sweden) C Lister (Czech Republic) R Voráčová	6^{2}	0
(Romania) E Bogdan (Netherlands) R van der Hoek	4	1
2	(Chile) A Guarachi (Montenegro) D Kovinić	6	6

Final
(Japan) M Doi (Russia) N Vikhlyantseva	7	6^{4}	[10]
2	(Chile) A Guarachi (Montenegro) D Kovinić	5	7^{7}	[7]
