= 2024 Geneva Open – Singles =

Singles
- 2024 Geneva Open

Final
- Champion: (Norway) Casper Ruud
- Runner-up: (Czech Republic) Tomáš Macháč
- Score: 7–5, 6–3

Details
- Draw: 28 (4 Q / 3 WC )
- Seeds: 8

Events
Singles	Doubles
← 2023 ·	Geneva Open	· 2025 →

Casper Ruud defeated Tomáš Macháč in the final, 7–5, 6–3 to win the singles title at the 2024 Geneva Open. It was his third title at the tournament in four years. Ruud saved a match point en route to his 12th ATP Tour singles title, in the semifinals against Flavio Cobolli.

Nicolás Jarry was the reigning champion, but withdrew before the tournament began.

With his win over Yannick Hanfmann in the second round, Novak Djokovic became the third player in the Open Era to win 1,100 tour-level matches, after Jimmy Connors and Roger Federer.

== Seeds ==
The top four seeds receive a bye into the second round.

1. (Serbia) Novak Djokovic (semifinals)
2. (Norway) Casper Ruud (champion)
3. (United States) Taylor Fritz (second round)
4. (United States) Ben Shelton (second round)
5. (Argentina) Sebastián Báez (quarterfinals)
6. (Netherlands) Tallon Griekspoor (quarterfinals)
7. (Hungary) Fábián Marozsán (first round)
8. (United Kingdom) Jack Draper (first round)

== Draw ==
=== Key ===
- Q = Qualifier
- WC = Wild card
- LL = Lucky loser
- Alt = Alternate
- ITF = ITF entry
- PR = Protected ranking
- SR = Special ranking
- SE = Special exempt
- JE = Junior exempt
- JR = Junior Accelerator Programme entrant
- CO = College Accelerator Programme entrant
- NG = Next Gen Accelerator Program entrant
- w/o = Walkover
- r = Retired
- d = Defaulted

=== Finals ===
Semifinals
1/WC	(Serbia) Novak Djokovic	4	6	1
(Czech Republic) Tomáš Macháč	6	0	6
(Italy) Flavio Cobolli	6	1	6^{4}
2	(Norway) Casper Ruud	1	6	7^{7}

Final
(Czech Republic) Tomáš Macháč	5	3
2	(Norway) Casper Ruud	7	6

=== Top half ===
First round
(Germany) Y Hanfmann	7	6
WC	(United Kingdom) A Murray	5	2
(Argentina) F Coria	5	0
WC	(Canada) D Shapovalov	7	6
(United States) C Eubanks	4	6	3
6	(Netherlands) T Griekspoor	6	1	6
Q	(United States) A Kovacevic	6	3	4
(United States) A Michelsen	3	6	6
Q	(Belgium) D Goffin	2	1
Q	(United States) N Moreno de Alboran	6	6
(Czech Republic) T Macháč	7^{8}	6
8	(United Kingdom) J Draper	6^{6}	1

Second round
1/WC	(Serbia) N Djokovic	6	6
(Germany) Y Hanfmann	3	3
WC	(Canada) D Shapovalov	7^{9}	6^{4}	3
6	(Netherlands) T Griekspoor	6^{7}	7^{7}	6
3	(United States) T Fritz	4	6	5
(United States) A Michelsen	6	4	7
Q	(United States) N Moreno de Alboran	6	5	0
(Czech Republic) T Macháč	4	7	6

Quarterfinals
1/WC	(Serbia) N Djokovic	7	6
6	(Netherlands) T Griekspoor	5	1
(United States) A Michelsen	3	6^{2}
(Czech Republic) T Macháč	6	7^{7}

Semifinals
1/WC	(Serbia) N Djokovic	4	6	1
(Czech Republic) T Macháč	6	0	6

=== Bottom half ===
First round
7	(Hungary) F Marozsán	4	6^{4}
(Kazakhstan) A Shevchenko	6	7^{7}
(Finland) E Ruusuvuori	6	6
(United States) M Giron	3	3
A Karatsev	5	1
(Italy) F Cobolli	7	6
5	(Argentina) S Báez	7^{9}	6
(India) S Nagal	6^{7}	3
(Germany) D Altmaier	6^{2}	4
(Spain) R Carballés Baena	7^{7}	6
(Australia) R Hijikata	6	4	3
Q	(Austria) S Ofner	4	6	6

Second round
(Kazakhstan) A Shevchenko	w/o
(Finland) E Ruusuvuori
(Italy) F Cobolli	4	7^{7}	6
4	(United States) B Shelton	6	6^{1}	2
5	(Argentina) S Báez	6	6
(Spain) R Carballés Baena	3	0
Q	(Austria) S Ofner	6	2	2
2	(Norway) C Ruud	4	6	6

Quarterfinals
(Kazakhstan) A Shevchenko	4	4
(Italy) F Cobolli	6	6
5	(Argentina) S Báez	3	6	4
2	(Norway) C Ruud	6	3	6

Semifinals
(Italy) F Cobolli	6	1	6^{4}
2	(Norway) C Ruud	1	6	7^{7}

== Qualifying ==
=== Seeds ===
1. (Austria) Sebastian Ofner (qualified)
2. (United States) Aleksandar Kovacevic (qualified)
3. (Belgium) David Goffin (qualified)
4. (United States) Nicolas Moreno de Alboran (qualified)
5. (Argentina) Juan Pablo Ficovich (qualifying competition)
6. (Netherlands) Gijs Brouwer (qualifying competition)
7. (Jordan) Abdullah Shelbayh (qualifying competition)
8. (United States) Ethan Quinn (first round)

=== Qualifiers ===
1. (Austria) Sebastian Ofner
2. (United States) Aleksandar Kovacevic
3. (Belgium) David Goffin
4. (United States) Nicolas Moreno de Alboran

=== Qualifying draw ===
==== First qualifier ====
First round
1	(Austria) Sebastian Ofner	6	6
WC	(Germany) Hendrik Jebens	4	3
Ivan Gakhov	6^{4}	7^{7}	6
8	(United States) Ethan Quinn	7^{7}	6^{4}	4

Qualifying competition
1	(Austria) Sebastian Ofner	7	6
Ivan Gakhov	5	2

==== Second qualifier ====
First round
2	(United States) Aleksandar Kovacevic	7^{7}	6^{6}	6
(United States) Mitchell Krueger	6^{3}	7^{8}	1
Alt	(Switzerland) Damien Wenger	2	4
7	(Jordan) Abdullah Shelbayh	6	6

Qualifying competition
2	(United States) Aleksandar Kovacevic	6	3	6
7	(Jordan) Abdullah Shelbayh	3	6	3

==== Third qualifier ====
First round
3	(Belgium) David Goffin	6	6
(Italy) Gianluca Mager	3	1
Alt	(Switzerland) Antoine Bellier	3	4
6	(Netherlands) Gijs Brouwer	6	6

Qualifying competition
3	(Belgium) David Goffin	6	6
6	(Netherlands) Gijs Brouwer	1	0

==== Fourth qualifier ====
First round
4	(United States) Nicolas Moreno de Alboran	4	6	7^{7}
Alt	(United States) Thai-Son Kwiatkowski	6	3	6^{4}
WC	(Switzerland) Jakub Paul	3	7^{7}	3
5	(Argentina) Juan Pablo Ficovich	6	6^{5}	6

Qualifying competition
4	(United States) Nicolas Moreno de Alboran	6	7^{8}
5	(Argentina) Juan Pablo Ficovich	4	6^{6}
