= 2024 Geneva Open =

ATP tennis tournament

- Date: 18–25 May
- Edition: 21st
- Category: ATP Tour 250
- Draw: 28S /16Q /16D
- Prize money: €562,815
- Surface: Clay
- Location: Geneva, Switzerland
- Venue: Tennis Club de Genève

Champions

Singles
- (Norway) Casper Ruud

Doubles
- (El Salvador) Marcelo Arévalo / (Croatia) Mate Pavić
- Geneva Open

The 2024 Gonet Geneva Open was an ATP 250 tennis tournament played on outdoor clay courts. It was the 21st edition of the Geneva Open and part of the ATP Tour 250 series of the 2024 ATP Tour. It took place at the Tennis Club de Genève in Geneva, Switzerland, from 18 to 25 May 2024.

== Champions ==
=== Singles ===
- (Norway) Casper Ruud def. (Czech Republic) Tomáš Macháč, 7–5, 6–3

=== Doubles ===
- (El Salvador) Marcelo Arévalo / (Croatia) Mate Pavić def. (United Kingdom) Lloyd Glasspool / (Netherlands) Jean-Julien Rojer, 7–6^{(7–2)}, 7–5

== Points and prize money ==
=== Point distribution ===
Event	W	F	SF	QF	Round of 16	Round of 32	Q	Q2	Q1
Singles	250	165	100	50	25	0	13	7	0
Doubles	250	150	90	45	0	—N/a	—N/a	—N/a	—N/a

=== Prize money ===
Event	W	F	SF	QF	Round of 16	Round of 32	Q2	Q1
Singles	€88,125	€51,400	€30,220	€17,510	€10,165	€6,215	€3,105	€1,695
Doubles*	€30,610	€16,380	€9,600	€5,370	€3,160	—N/a	—N/a	—N/a

_{*per team}

== Singles main draw entrants ==
=== Seeds ===
Country	Player	Rank^{1}	Seed
SRB	Novak Djokovic	1	1
NOR	Casper Ruud	6	2
USA	Taylor Fritz	13	3
USA	Ben Shelton	14	4
ARG	Sebastián Báez	19	5
NED	Tallon Griekspoor	26	6
HUN	Fábián Marozsán	36	7
GBR	Jack Draper	40	8

- Rankings are as of 6 May 2024.

=== Other entrants ===
The following players received wildcards into the singles main draw:

- (Serbia) Novak Djokovic
- (United Kingdom) Andy Murray
- (Canada) Denis Shapovalov

The following players received entry from the qualifying draw:

- (Belgium) David Goffin
- (United States) Aleksandar Kovacevic
- (United States) Nicolas Moreno de Alboran
- (Austria) Sebastian Ofner

=== Withdrawals ===
- (Argentina) Facundo Díaz Acosta → replaced by (Germany) Daniel Altmaier
- (Chile) Nicolás Jarry → replaced by (India) Sumit Nagal
- (Czech Republic) Jiří Lehečka → replaced by (Germany) Yannick Hanfmann
- (Japan) Kei Nishikori → replaced by (Italy) Flavio Cobolli
- (United States) Tommy Paul → replaced by (Australia) Rinky Hijikata
- (Germany) Jan-Lennard Struff → replaced by (Spain) Roberto Carballés Baena
- (Australia) Jordan Thompson → replaced by (Kazakhstan) Alexander Shevchenko

== Doubles main draw entrants ==
=== Seeds ===
Country	Player	Country	Player	Rank^{1}	Seed
MON	Hugo Nys	POL	Jan Zieliński	33	1
GBR	Jamie Murray	NZL	Michael Venus	45	2
ESA	Marcelo Arévalo	CRO	Mate Pavić	51	3
GER	Andreas Mies	GBR	Neal Skupski	54	4

- Rankings are as of 6 May 2024.

=== Other entrants ===
The following pairs received wildcards into the doubles main draw:

- (Switzerland) Antoine Bellier / (Switzerland) Jakub Paul
- (Switzerland) Luca Margaroli / (Switzerland) Damien Wenger

The following pair received entry as alternates:

- (Czech Republic) Tomáš Macháč / (Czech Republic) Petr Nouza

=== Withdrawals ===
- (India) Sriram Balaji / (France) Nicolas Mahut → replaced by (Czech Republic) Tomáš Macháč / (Czech Republic) Petr Nouza
