= 2019 Swedish Open – Women's singles =

Women's singles
- 2019 Swedish Open

Final
- Champion: (Japan) Misaki Doi
- Runner-up: (Montenegro) Danka Kovinić
- Score: 6–4, 6–4

Events
Singles	men	women
Doubles	men	women
- Swedish Open

Kateřina Siniaková was the defending champion from the last time the tournament was held in 2017, but chose not to participate this year.

Misaki Doi won the title, defeating Danka Kovinić in the final, 6–4, 6–4.

== Seeds ==
1. (Romania) Sorana Cîrstea (first round)
2. (Switzerland) Jil Teichmann (first round)
3. (Spain) Aliona Bolsova (second round)
4. (Germany) Mona Barthel (quarterfinals)
5. (France) Fiona Ferro (quarterfinals)
6. (Russia) Natalia Vikhlyantseva (quarterfinals)
7. (Kazakhstan) Elena Rybakina (second round)
8. (Serbia) Aleksandra Krunić (semifinals)

== Draw ==
Key

- Q = Qualifier
- WC = Wild card
- LL = Lucky loser
- Alt = Alternate
- ITF = ITF entry
- PR = Protected ranking
- SR = Special ranking
- SE = Special exempt
- JE = Junior exempt
- JR = Junior Accelerator Programme entrant
- CO = College Accelerator Programme entrant
- NG = Next Gen Accelerator Program entrant
- w/o = Walkover
- r = Retired
- d = Defaulted

=== Finals ===
Semifinals
8	(Serbia) Aleksandra Krunić	1	5
(Japan) Misaki Doi	6	7
(Montenegro) Danka Kovinić	2	6	6
(Poland) Katarzyna Kawa	6	4	1

Final
(Japan) Misaki Doi	6	6
(Montenegro) Danka Kovinić	4	4

=== Top half ===
First round
1	(Romania) S Cîrstea	0	6^{2}
(Sweden) J Larsson	6	7^{7}
(United States) A Kiick	4	1
(Netherlands) A Rus	6	6
(Turkey) B Eraydın	6	6
(Belgium) K Zimmermann	1	3
WC	(Sweden) C Hennemann	3	1
8	(Serbia) A Krunić	6	6
4	(Germany) M Barthel	3	7	6
(Venezuela) A Gámiz	6	5	3
(Croatia) T Mrdeža	6	2	6
(Spain) L Arruabarrena	2	6	3
(Australia) A Bai	1	1
(Japan) M Doi	6	6
(Denmark) C Tauson	4	6^{5}
7	(Kazakhstan) E Rybakina	6	7^{7}

Second round
(Sweden) J Larsson	6	6
(Netherlands) A Rus	1	0
(Turkey) B Eraydın	2	1
8	(Serbia) A Krunić	6	6
4	(Germany) M Barthel	6	6
(Croatia) T Mrdeža	3	0
(Japan) M Doi	4	6	6
7	(Kazakhstan) E Rybakina	6	4	4

Quarterfinals
(Sweden) J Larsson	4	7^{7}	4
8	(Serbia) A Krunić	6	6^{5}	6
4	(Germany) M Barthel	2	6	2
(Japan) M Doi	6	3	6

Semifinals
8	(Serbia) A Krunić	1	5
(Japan) M Doi	6	7

=== Bottom half ===
First round
6	(Russia) N Vikhlyantseva	6	6
(Italy) S Errani	0	3
(Georgia (country)) E Gorgodze	6	6
WC	(Sweden) C Lister	3	2
(Hungary) D Gálfi	3	7	1
(Montenegro) D Kovinić	6	5	6
(Argentina) P Ormaechea	3	0
3	(Spain) A Bolsova	6	6
5	(France) F Ferro	6	2	6
WC	(Sweden) S Celik	0	6	4
WC	(Sweden) M Björklund	6^{7}	7^{7}	7^{7}
(Germany) A Zaja	7^{9}	6^{0}	6^{3}
(Slovakia) J Čepelová	7	6^{7}	2
(Poland) K Kawa	5	7^{9}	6
(Ukraine) A Kalinina	6	6
2	(Switzerland) J Teichmann	4	1

Second round
6	(Russia) N Vikhlyantseva	6	6
(Georgia (country)) E Gorgodze	3	0
(Montenegro) D Kovinić	6	6
3	(Spain) A Bolsova	4	2
5	(France) F Ferro	6	5	6
WC	(Sweden) M Björklund	2	7	3
(Poland) K Kawa	2	6	6
(Ukraine) A Kalinina	6	3	3

Quarterfinals
6	(Russia) N Vikhlyantseva	2	2
(Montenegro) D Kovinić	6	6
5	(France) F Ferro	0	2
(Poland) K Kawa	6	6

Semifinals
(Montenegro) D Kovinić	2	6	6
(Poland) K Kawa	6	4	1
