= 2017 Quito Challenger – Singles =

Singles
- 2017 Quito Challenger

Final
- Champion: (Chile) Nicolás Jarry
- Runner-up: (Austria) Gerald Melzer
- Score: 6–3, 6–2

Events
Singles	Doubles
- Quito Challenger

Horacio Zeballos was the defending champion but chose not to defend his title.

Nicolás Jarry won the title after defeating Gerald Melzer 6–3, 6–2 in the final.

== Seeds ==
1. (Dominican Republic) Víctor Estrella Burgos (semifinals)
2. (Argentina) Renzo Olivo (first round)
3. (Chile) Nicolás Jarry (champion)
4. (Austria) Sebastian Ofner (first round)
5. (Austria) Gerald Melzer (final)
6. (Slovakia) Andrej Martin (quarterfinals)
7. (Brazil) Guilherme Clezar (quarterfinals)
8. (India) Prajnesh Gunneswaran (first round)

== Draw ==
Key

- Q = Qualifier
- WC = Wild card
- LL = Lucky loser
- Alt = Alternate
- ITF = ITF entry
- PR = Protected ranking
- SR = Special ranking
- SE = Special exempt
- JE = Junior exempt
- JR = Junior Accelerator Programme entrant
- CO = College Accelerator Programme entrant
- NG = Next Gen Accelerator Program entrant
- w/o = Walkover
- r = Retired
- d = Defaulted

=== Finals ===
Semifinals
1	(Dominican Republic) Víctor Estrella Burgos	6	6^{4}	3
3	(Chile) Nicolás Jarry	4	7^{7}	6
5	(Austria) Gerald Melzer	7^{7}	6
(Argentina) Facundo Mena	6^{4}	4

Final
3	(Chile) Nicolás Jarry	6	6
5	(Austria) Gerald Melzer	3	2

=== Top half ===
First round
1	(Dominican Republic) V Estrella Burgos	6	3	6
(New Zealand) J Statham	4	6	3
(Brazil) B Sant'Anna	1	1
(Ecuador) G Escobar	6	6
Alt	(Colombia) C Rodríguez	6^{5}	3
WC	(Ecuador) E Gómez	7^{7}	6
Q	(Mexico) M Sánchez	2	2
6	(Slovakia) A Martin	6	6
3	(Chile) N Jarry	6	6
(Argentina) JP Paz	4	3
(Brazil) JP Sorgi	6	3	6
(Argentina) JP Ficovich	3	6	3
(Ecuador) R Quiroz	4	6	6
WC	(Ecuador) D Hidalgo	6	4	4
Q	(Colombia) C Salamanca	7^{7}	6^{2}	0^{r}
7	(Brazil) G Clezar	6^{5}	7^{7}	3

Second round
1	(Dominican Republic) V Estrella Burgos	7^{7}	6
(Ecuador) G Escobar	6^{5}	3
WC	(Ecuador) E Gómez	3	5
6	(Slovakia) A Martin	6	7
3	(Chile) N Jarry	6	6
(Brazil) JP Sorgi	4	4
(Ecuador) R Quiroz	3	7^{7}	2
7	(Brazil) G Clezar	6	6^{3}	6

Quarterfinals
1	(Dominican Republic) V Estrella Burgos	7^{8}	7
6	(Slovakia) A Martin	6^{6}	5
3	(Chile) N Jarry	4	7^{7}	6
7	(Brazil) G Clezar	6	6^{4}	4

Semifinals
1	(Dominican Republic) V Estrella Burgos	6	6^{4}	3
3	(Chile) N Jarry	4	7^{7}	6

=== Bottom half ===
First round
5	(Austria) G Melzer	6	6
Q	(Peru) JP Varillas	4	2
(Austria) M Linzer	7^{7}	4	6
(Argentina) A Velotti	6^{2}	6	3
(Sweden) C Lindell	5	0^{r}
(France) M Hamou	7	0
(Colombia) DE Galán	6	5	6
4	(Austria) S Ofner	4	7	4
8	(India) P Gunneswaran	3	7	4
(El Salvador) M Arévalo	6	5	6
(Argentina) F Mena	6	6
(Argentina) JI Londero	4	2
Q	(Brazil) P Sakamoto	7^{9}	3	4
WC	(Chile) G Lama	6^{7}	6	6
(Italy) R Bellotti	7^{8}	4	6
2/WC	(Argentina) R Olivo	6^{6}	6	4

Second round
5	(Austria) G Melzer	7^{13}	6
(Austria) M Linzer	6^{11}	3
(France) M Hamou	7^{7}	4	7
(Colombia) DE Galán	6^{4}	6	5
(El Salvador) M Arévalo	6^{3}	3
(Argentina) F Mena	7^{7}	6
WC	(Chile) G Lama	6	5
(Italy) R Bellotti	1	4^{r}

Quarterfinals
5	(Austria) G Melzer	6	6
(France) M Hamou	2	4
(Argentina) F Mena	3	6	7^{7}
WC	(Chile) G Lama	6	2	6^{2}

Semifinals
5	(Austria) G Melzer	7^{7}	6
(Argentina) F Mena	6^{4}	4
