= 2019 Swedish Open =

- Date: 15–21 July (men); 8–13 July (women)
- Edition: 72nd (men); 10th (women)
- Surface: Clay
- Venue: Båstad tennis stadium

Champions

Men's singles
- (Chile) Nicolás Jarry

Women's singles
- (Japan) Misaki Doi

Men's doubles
- (Belgium) Sander Gillé / (Belgium) Joran Vliegen

Women's doubles
- (Japan) Misaki Doi / (Russia) Natalia Vikhlyantseva
← 2018 ·	Swedish Open	· 2021 →

The 2019 Swedish Open was a tennis tournament played on outdoor clay courts as part of the ATP Tour 250 Series of the 2019 ATP Tour and as part of the WTA 125K Series. It took place in Båstad, Sweden, from 15 through 21 July 2019 for the men's tournament, and from 8 through 13 July 2019 for the women's tournament. It was the 72nd edition of the event for the men and the 10th edition for the women.

== Points and prize money ==
=== Point distribution ===
Event	W	F	SF	QF	Round of 16	Round of 32	Q	Q2	Q1
Men's singles	250	150	90	45	20	0	12	6	0
Men's doubles	250	150	90	45	0	—	—	—	—
Women's singles	160	95	57	29	15	1	—	—	—
Women's doubles	160	95	57	29	1	—	—	—	—

=== Prize money ===
Event	W	F	SF	QF	Round of 16	Round of 32^{1}	Q2	Q1
Men's singles	€85,945	€45,265	€24,520	€13,970	€8,230	€4,875	€2,195	€1,100
Men's doubles *	€26,110	€13,730	€7,440	€4,260	€2,490	—	—	—
Women's singles	$20,000	$11,400	$6,500	$4,000	$2,325	$1,175	—	—
Women's doubles *	$5,500	$2,700	$1,400	$750	$450	—	—	—

_{^{1} Qualifiers prize money is also the Round of 32 prize money}
_{* per team}

== ATP singles main-draw entrants ==
=== Seeds ===
Country	Player	Rank^{1}	Seed
CHI	Cristian Garín	34	1
ESP	Fernando Verdasco	37	2
URU	Pablo Cuevas	45	3
FRA	Richard Gasquet	47	4
CHI	Nicolás Jarry	53	5
ARG	Juan Ignacio Londero	60	6
NOR	Casper Ruud	62	7
POR	João Sousa	69	8

- ^{1} Rankings are as of July 1, 2019

=== Other entrants ===
The following players received wildcards into the singles main draw:

- (Spain) Alejandro Davidovich Fokina
- (Sweden) Elias Ymer
- (Sweden) Mikael Ymer

The following players received entry using a protected ranking into the main draw:

- (Belgium) Steve Darcis
- (Slovakia) Jozef Kovalík

The following players received entry from the qualifying draw:

- (Argentina) Facundo Argüello
- (Spain) Pablo Carreño Busta
- (France) Constant Lestienne
- (Spain) Bernabé Zapata Miralles

=== Withdrawals ===
Before the tournament

- (Italy) Matteo Berrettini → replaced by (Brazil) Thiago Monteiro
- (Italy) Lorenzo Sonego → replaced by (Austria) Dennis Novak

=== Retirements ===
- (Latvia) Ernests Gulbis

== ATP doubles main-draw entrants ==
=== Seeds ===
Country	Player	Country	Player	Rank^{1}	Seed
CZE	Roman Jebavý	NED	Matwé Middelkoop	96	1
BRA	Marcelo Demoliner	CHI	Nicolás Jarry	111	2
ARG	Federico Delbonis	ARG	Horacio Zeballos	132	3
TPE	Hsieh Cheng-peng	INA	Christopher Rungkat	132	4

- Rankings are as of July 1, 2019

=== Other entrants ===
The following pairs received wildcards into the doubles main draw:

- (Sweden) Markus Eriksson / (Sweden) André Göransson
- (Sweden) Elias Ymer / (Sweden) Mikael Ymer

== WTA singles main-draw entrants ==
=== Seeds ===
Country	Player	Rank^{1}	Seed
ROU	Sorana Cîrstea	77	1
SUI	Jil Teichmann	89	2
ESP	Aliona Bolsova	92	3
GER	Mona Barthel	96	4
FRA	Fiona Ferro	100	5
RUS	Natalia Vikhlyantseva	105	6
KAZ	Elena Rybakina	109	7
SRB	Aleksandra Krunić	113	8

- ^{1} Rankings are as of July 1, 2019

=== Other entrants ===
The following players received wildcards into the singles main draw:

- (Sweden) Mirjam Björklund
- (Sweden) Susanne Celik
- (Sweden) Caijsa Hennemann
- (Sweden) Cornelia Lister

=== Withdrawals ===
- (Spain) Paula Badosa → replaced by (Belgium) Kimberley Zimmermann
- (Romania) Ana Bogdan → replaced by (Poland) Katarzyna Kawa
- (Czech Republic) Marie Bouzková → replaced by (Sweden) Johanna Larsson
- (Brazil) Beatriz Haddad Maia → replaced by (Georgia (country)) Ekaterine Gorgodze
- (Slovenia) Polona Hercog → replaced by (Croatia) Tereza Mrdeža
- (Serbia) Ivana Jorović → replaced by (Montenegro) Danka Kovinić
- (Slovenia) Kaja Juvan → replaced by (Slovakia) Jana Čepelová
- (Czech Republic) Barbora Krejčíková → replaced by (Hungary) Dalma Gálfi
- (Czech Republic) Kristýna Plíšková → replaced by (Venezuela) Andrea Gámiz
- (Russia) Anastasia Potapova → replaced by (Turkey) Başak Eraydın
- (Slovakia) Anna Karolína Schmiedlová → replaced by (Ukraine) Anhelina Kalinina
- (Germany) Laura Siegemund → replaced by (Germany) Anna Zaja
- (China) Zhang Shuai → replaced by (Argentina) Paula Ormaechea
- (Slovenia) Tamara Zidanšek → replaced by (Italy) Sara Errani

== WTA doubles main-draw entrants ==
=== Seeds ===
Country	Player	Country	Player	Rank^{1}	Seed
ESP	Lara Arruabarrena	SWE	Johanna Larsson	87	1
CHI	Alexa Guarachi	MNE	Danka Kovinić	163	2
GER	Mona Barthel	SUI	Xenia Knoll	171	3
SWE	Cornelia Lister	CZE	Renata Voráčová	173	4

- ^{1} Rankings are as of July 1, 2019

=== Other entrants ===
The following pair received a wildcard into the doubles main draw:

- (Sweden) Caijsa Hennemann / (Sweden) Fanny Östlund

== Champions ==
=== Men's singles ===
- (Chile) Nicolás Jarry def. (Argentina) Juan Ignacio Londero, 7–6^{(9–7)}, 6–4

=== Women's singles ===
- (Japan) Misaki Doi def. (Montenegro) Danka Kovinić, 6–4, 6–4

=== Men's doubles ===
- (Belgium) Sander Gillé / (Belgium) Joran Vliegen def. (Argentina) Federico Delbonis / (Argentina) Horacio Zeballos, 6–7^{(5–7)}, 7–5, [10–5]

=== Women's doubles ===
- (Japan) Misaki Doi / (Russia) Natalia Vikhlyantseva def. (Chile) Alexa Guarachi / (Montenegro) Danka Kovinić, 7–5, 6–7^{(4–7)}, [10–7]
