= 2023 Chile Open – Doubles =

Doubles
- 2023 Chile Open

Final
- Champions: (Italy) Andrea Pellegrino (Italy) Andrea Vavassori
- Runners-up: (Brazil) Thiago Seyboth Wild (Chile) Matías Soto
- Score: 6–4, 3–6, [12–10]

Events
Singles	Doubles
← 2022 ·	Chile Open	· 2024 →

Andrea Pellegrino and Andrea Vavassori defeated Thiago Seyboth Wild and Matías Soto in the final, 6–4, 3–6, [12–10] to win the doubles tennis title at the 2023 Chile Open.

Rafael Matos and Felipe Meligeni Alves were the reigning champions, but chose not to participate this year.

== Seeds ==
1. (Argentina) Máximo González / (Argentina) Andrés Molteni (quarterfinals)
2. (Kazakhstan) Andrey Golubev / (Kazakhstan) Aleksandr Nedovyesov (first round)
3. (Colombia) Nicolás Barrientos / (Uruguay) Ariel Behar (quarterfinals)
4. (Portugal) Francisco Cabral / (Serbia) Nikola Ćaćić (quarterfinals)

== Draw ==
=== Key ===
- Q = Qualifier
- WC = Wild card
- LL = Lucky loser
- Alt = Alternate
- SE = Special exempt
- PR = Protected ranking
- ITF = ITF entry
- JE = Junior exempt
- w/o = Walkover
- r = Retired
- d = Defaulted
- SR = Special ranking

=== Draw ===
First round
1	(Argentina) M González (Argentina) A Molteni	6	6
(Argentina) JM Cerúndolo (Argentina) C Ugo Carabelli	1	1
(Argentina) F Bagnis (Peru) JP Varillas	3	3
WC	(Chile) T Barrios Vera (Chile) A Tabilo	6	6
3	(Colombia) N Barrientos (Uruguay) A Behar	6	6
(Spain) S Martos Gornés (Spain) C Taberner	3	4
(United States) A Lawson (New Zealand) A Sitak	6^{4}	3
(Italy) A Pellegrino (Italy) A Vavassori	7^{7}	6
(Argentina) P Cachin (Argentina) TM Etcheverry	4	3
(Spain) P Martínez (Spain) J Munar	6	6
(Ecuador) D Hidalgo (Colombia) C Rodríguez	4	4
4	(Portugal) F Cabral (Serbia) N Ćaćić	6	6
(Venezuela) LD Martínez (Brazil) F Romboli	7^{7}	4	[5]
WC	(Brazil) T Seyboth Wild (Chile) M Soto	6^{3}	6	[10]
(India) S Balaji (India) J Nedunchezhiyan	7	4	[11]
2	(Kazakhstan) A Golubev (Kazakhstan) A Nedovyesov	5	6	[9]

Quarterfinals
1	(Argentina) M González (Argentina) A Molteni	1	6	[7]
WC	(Chile) T Barrios Vera (Chile) A Tabilo	6	3	[10]
3	(Colombia) N Barrientos (Uruguay) A Behar	6^{12}	3
(Italy) A Pellegrino (Italy) A Vavassori	7^{14}	6
(Spain) P Martínez (Spain) J Munar	6	6
4	(Portugal) F Cabral (Serbia) N Ćaćić	4	4
WC	(Brazil) T Seyboth Wild (Chile) M Soto	3	6	[10]
(India) S Balaji (India) J Nedunchezhiyan	6	1	[4]

Semifinals
WC	(Chile) T Barrios Vera (Chile) A Tabilo
(Italy) A Pellegrino (Italy) A Vavassori	w/o
(Spain) P Martínez (Spain) J Munar	1	7^{7}	[8]
WC	(Brazil) T Seyboth Wild (Chile) M Soto	6	6^{5}	[10]

Final
(Italy) A Pellegrino (Italy) A Vavassori	6	3	[12]
WC	(Brazil) T Seyboth Wild (Chile) M Soto	4	6	[10]
