= 2017 Quito Challenger – Doubles =

Doubles
- 2017 Quito Challenger

Final
- Champions: (El Salvador) Marcelo Arévalo (Mexico) Miguel Ángel Reyes-Varela
- Runners-up: (Chile) Nicolás Jarry (Ecuador) Roberto Quiroz
- Score: 4–6, 6–4, [10–7]

Events
Singles	Doubles
- Quito Challenger

Marcelo Demoliner and João Souza were the defending champions but chose not to defend their title.

Marcelo Arévalo and Miguel Ángel Reyes-Varela won the title after defeating Nicolás Jarry and Roberto Quiroz 4–6, 6–4, [10–7] in the final.

== Seeds ==
1. (Uruguay) Marcel Felder / (Brazil) Fabrício Neis (first round)
2. (Chile) Nicolás Jarry / (Ecuador) Roberto Quiroz (final)
3. (Ecuador) Gonzalo Escobar / (Mexico) Hans Hach Verdugo (first round)
4. (Argentina) Juan Ignacio Londero / (Venezuela) Luis David Martínez (first round)

== Draw ==
Key

- Q = Qualifier
- WC = Wild card
- LL = Lucky loser
- Alt = Alternate
- ITF = ITF entry
- PR = Protected ranking
- SR = Special ranking
- SE = Special exempt
- JE = Junior exempt
- JR = Junior Accelerator Programme entrant
- CO = College Accelerator Programme entrant
- NG = Next Gen Accelerator Program entrant
- w/o = Walkover
- r = Retired
- d = Defaulted

First round
1	(Uruguay) M Felder (Brazil) F Neis	1	4
WC	(Colombia) Felipe Mantilla (Colombia) C Rodríguez	6	6
(Italy) R Bellotti (Austria) S Ofner	4	6^{3}
WC	(Dominican Republic) V Estrella Burgos (Colombia) C Salamanca	6	7^{7}
4	(Argentina) JI Londero (Venezuela) LD Martínez	6	2	[6]
(El Salvador) M Arévalo (Mexico) MÁ Reyes-Varela	2	6	[10]
WC	(Ecuador) D Hidalgo (Bolivia) F Zeballos	6	3	[10]
(Peru) M Echazú (Austria) M Linzer	4	6	[2]
(Peru) S Galdós (Venezuela) R Maytín	6	7
(Brazil) B Sant'Anna (Brazil) JP Sorgi	4	5
(Brazil) F de Paula (Sweden) C Lindell	6	7^{7}
3	(Ecuador) G Escobar (Mexico) H Hach Verdugo	4	6^{5}
(Brazil) P Bernardi (Brazil) G Clezar	4	2
(Argentina) F Mena (Argentina) A Velotti	6	6
(Colombia) DE Galán (New Zealand) J Statham	6^{4}	1
2	(Chile) N Jarry (Ecuador) R Quiroz	7^{7}	6

Quarterfinals
WC	(Colombia) F Mantilla (Colombia) C Rodríguez	3	7^{7}	[5]
WC	(Dominican Republic) V Estrella Burgos (Colombia) C Salamanca	6	6^{4}	[10]
(El Salvador) M Arévalo (Mexico) MÁ Reyes-Varela	6	6^{5}	[10]
WC	(Ecuador) D Hidalgo (Bolivia) F Zeballos	4	7^{7}	[8]
(Peru) S Galdós (Venezuela) R Maytín	3	6	[6]
(Brazil) F de Paula (Sweden) C Lindell	6	4	[10]
(Argentina) F Mena (Argentina) A Velotti	3	5
2	(Chile) N Jarry (Ecuador) R Quiroz	6	7

Semifinals
WC	(Dominican Republic) V Estrella Burgos (Colombia) C Salamanca	1	3
(El Salvador) M Arévalo (Mexico) MÁ Reyes-Varela	6	6
(Brazil) F de Paula (Sweden) C Lindell	3	4
2	(Chile) N Jarry (Ecuador) R Quiroz	6	6

Final
(El Salvador) M Arévalo (Mexico) MÁ Reyes-Varela	4	6	[10]
2	(Chile) N Jarry (Ecuador) R Quiroz	6	4	[7]
