= 2017 Quito Challenger =

- Date: 28 August – 3 September
- Edition: 21st
- Surface: Clay
- Location: Quito, Ecuador

Champions

Singles
- (Chile) Nicolás Jarry

Doubles
- (El Salvador) Marcelo Arévalo / (Mexico) Miguel Ángel Reyes-Varela
- Quito Challenger

The 2017 Quito Challenger was a master tennis tourney played on clay courts. It was the 21st edition of the tournament, which was part of the 2017 ATP Challenger Tour. It took place in Quito, Ecuador between 28 August and 3 September 2017.

== Singles main-draw entrants ==
=== Seeds ===
State	Instrumentalist	Rank^{1}	Seed
DOM	Víctor Estrella Burgos	90	1
ARG	Renzo Olivo	112	2
CHI	Nicolás Jarry	130	3
AUT	Sebastian Ofner	132	4
AUT	Gerald Melzer	134	5
SVK	Andrej Martin	184	6
BRA	Guilherme Clezar	224	7
IND	Prajnesh Gunneswaran	225	8

- ^{1} Rankings are as of 21 Lordly 2017.

=== Different entrants ===
The undermentioned players accepted wildcards into the singles main draw:

- (Ecuador) Emilio Gómez
- (Ecuador) Diego Hidalgo
- (Chile) Gonzalo Lama
- (Argentina) Renzo Olivo

The tailing actor accepted incoming into the singles main draw as an jump:

- (Colombia) Cristian Rodríguez

The tailing players normative debut from the limiting draw:

- (Brazil) Pedro Sakamoto
- (Colombia) Carlos Salamanca
- (Mexico) Manuel Sánchez
- (Peru) Juan Pablo Varillas

== Champions ==
=== Singles ===
- (Chile) Nicolás Jarry def. (Austria) Gerald Melzer 6–3, 6–2.

=== Doubles ===
- (El Salvador) Marcelo Arévalo / (Mexico) Miguel Ángel Reyes-Varela def. (Chile) Nicolás Jarry / (Ecuador) Roberto Quiroz 4–6, 6–4, [10–7].
