= 2023 Chile Open =

- Date: 27 February – 5 March
- Edition: 25th
- Category: ATP Tour 250 series
- Draw: 28S / 16D
- Prize money: $642,735
- Surface: Clay / outdoor
- Location: Santiago, Chile
- Venue: Estadio San Carlos de Apoquindo

Champions

Singles
- (Chile) Nicolás Jarry

Doubles
- (Italy) Andrea Pellegrino / (Italy) Andrea Vavassori
← 2022 ·	Chile Open	· 2024 →

The 2023 Chile Open (also known as the Movistar Chile Open for sponsorship reasons) was a men's tennis tournament played on outdoor clay courts. It was the 25th edition of the Chile Open, and part of the ATP 250 of the 2023 ATP Tour. It took place in Santiago, Chile from 27 February through 5 March 2023.

== Finals ==
=== Singles ===
- (Chile) Nicolás Jarry def. (Argentina) Tomás Martín Etcheverry, 6–7^{(5–7)}, 7–6^{(7–5)}, 6–2

=== Doubles ===
- (Italy) Andrea Pellegrino / (Italy) Andrea Vavassori def. (Brazil) Thiago Seyboth Wild / (Chile) Matías Soto, 6–4, 3–6, [12–10]

== Point and prize money ==
=== Point distribution ===
Event	W	F	SF	QF	Round of 16	Round of 32	Q	Q2	Q1
Singles	250	150	90	45	20	0	12	6	0
Doubles	250	150	90	45	0	—	—	—	—

=== Prize money ===
Event	W	F	SF	QF	Round of 16	Round of 32	Q2	Q1
Singles	$97,760	$57,025	$33,525	$19,425	$11,280	$6,895	$3,445	$1,880
Doubles*	$33,960	$18,170	$10,660	$5,950	$3,510	—	—	—
Doubles prize money per team

== Singles main draw entrants ==
=== Seeds ===
Country	Player	Rank^{1}	Seed
ITA	Lorenzo Musetti	18	1
ARG	Francisco Cerúndolo	32	2
ARG	Sebastián Báez	35	3
ARG	Diego Schwartzman	38	4
ESP	Albert Ramos Viñolas	47	5
SRB	Laslo Đere	57	6
ARG	Pedro Cachin	59	7
~~ESP~~	~~Bernabé Zapata Miralles~~	~~63~~	~~8~~

- Rankings are as of February 20, 2023.

=== Other entrants ===
The following players received wildcards into the singles main draw:

- (Chile) Cristian Garín
- (Chile) Alejandro Tabilo
- (Austria) Dominic Thiem

The following player received entry as a special exempt:

- (Chile) Nicolás Jarry

The following players received entry from the qualifying draw:

- (Italy) Riccardo Bonadio
- (Argentina) Juan Manuel Cerúndolo
- (Germany) Yannick Hanfmann
- (Argentina) Camilo Ugo Carabelli

The following player received entry as a lucky loser:

- (Spain) Carlos Taberner

=== Withdrawals ===
- (Argentina) Federico Coria → replaced by (Peru) Juan Pablo Varillas
- (Spain) Bernabé Zapata Miralles → replaced by (Spain) Carlos Taberner

== Doubles main draw entrants ==
=== Seeds ===
Country	Player	Country	Player	Rank^{1}	Seed
ARG	Máximo González	ARG	Andrés Molteni	81	1
KAZ	Andrey Golubev	KAZ	Aleksandr Nedovyesov	112	2
COL	Nicolás Barrientos	URU	Ariel Behar	112	3
POR	Francisco Cabral	SRB	Nikola Ćaćić	130	4

- Rankings are as of February 20, 2023.

=== Other entrants ===
The following pairs received wildcards into the doubles main draw:

- (Chile) Tomás Barrios Vera / (Chile) Alejandro Tabilo
- (Brazil) Thiago Seyboth Wild / (Chile) Matías Soto

=== Withdrawals ===
- (Italy) Marco Bortolotti / (Spain) Sergio Martos Gornés → replaced by (Spain) Sergio Martos Gornés / (Spain) Carlos Taberner
- (Brazil) Marcelo Demoliner / (Italy) Andrea Vavassori → replaced by (Italy) Andrea Pellegrino / (Italy) Andrea Vavassori
- (Brazil) Thiago Monteiro / (Brazil) Fernando Romboli → replaced by (Venezuela) Luis David Martínez / (Brazil) Fernando Romboli
