= 2024 Geneva Open – Doubles =

Doubles
- 2024 Geneva Open

Final
- Champions: (El Salvador) Marcelo Arévalo (Croatia) Mate Pavić
- Runners-up: (United Kingdom) Lloyd Glasspool (Netherlands) Jean-Julien Rojer
- Score: 7–6^{(7–2)}, 7–5

Events
| Singles | Doubles |
- Geneva Open

Marcelo Arévalo and Mate Pavić defeated Lloyd Glasspool and Jean-Julien Rojer in the final, 7–6^{(7–2)}, 7–5 to win the doubles tennis title at the 2024 Geneva Open.

Jamie Murray and Michael Venus were the defending champions, but lost in the quarterfinals to Glasspool and Rojer.

== Seeds ==
1. (Monaco) Hugo Nys / (Poland) Jan Zieliński (semifinals)
2. (United Kingdom) Jamie Murray / (New Zealand) Michael Venus (quarterfinals)
3. (El Salvador) Marcelo Arévalo / (Croatia) Mate Pavić (champions)
4. (Germany) Andreas Mies / (United Kingdom) Neal Skupski (quarterfinals)

== Draw ==
Key

- Q = Qualifier
- WC = Wild card
- LL = Lucky loser
- Alt = Alternate
- ITF = ITF entry
- PR = Protected ranking
- SR = Special ranking
- SE = Special exempt
- JE = Junior exempt
- JR = Junior Accelerator Programme entrant
- CO = College Accelerator Programme entrant
- NG = Next Gen Accelerator Program entrant
- w/o = Walkover
- r = Retired
- d = Defaulted

=== Draw ===
First round
1 | (Monaco) H Nys (Poland) J Zieliński | 4 | 7 | [10]
Alt | (Czech Republic) T Macháč (Czech Republic) P Nouza | 6 | 5 | [7]
(United States) N Lammons (United States) J Withrow | 4 | 6 | [3]
(Ecuador) G Escobar (Kazakhstan) A Nedovyesov | 6 | 3 | [10]
3 | (El Salvador) M Arévalo (Croatia) M Pavić | 6 | 6
(Brazil) R Matos (Brazil) M Melo | 2 | 3
(United Kingdom) J Cash (United States) R Galloway | 6 | 6
(Austria) A Erler (Austria) L Miedler | 3 | 1
WC | (Switzerland) A Bellier (Switzerland) J Paul | 1 | 6^{6}
(Germany) C Frantzen (Germany) H Jebens | 6 | 7^{8}
(Uruguay) A Behar (Czech Republic) A Pavlásek | 4 | 6^{4}
4 | (Germany) A Mies (United Kingdom) N Skupski | 6 | 7^{7}
WC | (Switzerland) L Margaroli (Switzerland) D Wenger | 1 | 6^{6}
(United Kingdom) L Glasspool (Netherlands) J-J Rojer | 6 | 7^{8}
(Monaco) R Arneodo (Austria) S Weissborn | 3 | 6 | [8]
2 | (United Kingdom) J Murray (New Zealand) M Venus | 6 | 3 | [10]

Quarterfinals
1 | (Monaco) H Nys (Poland) J Zieliński | 7^{10} | 1 | [14]
(Ecuador) G Escobar (Kazakhstan) A Nedovyesov | 6^{8} | 6 | [12]
3 | (El Salvador) M Arévalo (Croatia) M Pavić | 6 | 6^{6} | [10]
(United Kingdom) J Cash (United States) R Galloway | 4 | 7^{8} | [6]
(Germany) C Frantzen (Germany) H Jebens | 7^{7} | 6
4 | (Germany) A Mies (United Kingdom) N Skupski | 6^{4} | 3
(United Kingdom) L Glasspool (Netherlands) J-J Rojer | 5 | 6 | [10]
2 | (United Kingdom) J Murray (New Zealand) M Venus | 7 | 3 | [5]

Semifinals
1 | (Monaco) H Nys (Poland) J Zieliński | 4 | 4
3 | (El Salvador) M Arévalo (Croatia) M Pavić | 6 | 6
(Germany) C Frantzen (Germany) H Jebens | 6 | 3 | [8]
(United Kingdom) L Glasspool (Netherlands) J-J Rojer | 4 | 6 | [10]

Final
3 | (El Salvador) M Arévalo (Croatia) M Pavić | 7^{7} | 7
(United Kingdom) L Glasspool (Netherlands) J-J Rojer | 6^{2} | 5
