= 2019 Swedish Open – Men's singles =

Men's singles
- 2019 Swedish Open

Final
- Champion: (Chile) Nicolás Jarry
- Runner-up: (Argentina) Juan Ignacio Londero
- Score: 7–6^{(9–7)}, 6–4

Events
Singles	men	women
Doubles	men	women
← 2018 ·	Swedish Open	· 2021 →

Fabio Fognini was the defending champion, but he chose to compete in Umag instead.

Nicolás Jarry won his first ATP Tour singles title, defeating Juan Ignacio Londero in the final, 7–6^{(9–7)}, 6–4.

== Seeds ==
The top four seeds receive a bye into the second round.

1. (Chile) Cristian Garín (second round)
2. (Spain) Fernando Verdasco (second round)
3. (Uruguay) Pablo Cuevas (second round)
4. (France) Richard Gasquet (quarterfinals)
5. (Chile) Nicolás Jarry (champion)
6. (Argentina) Juan Ignacio Londero (final)
7. (Norway) Casper Ruud (first round)
8. (Portugal) João Sousa (quarterfinals)

Note: Pablo Carreño Busta, who entered late and played in the qualifying tournament, would have been seeded fifth if he had entered the tournament prior to the initial entry cutoff date of 3 June 2019.

== Draw ==
=== Key ===
- Q = Qualifier
- WC = Wild card
- LL = Lucky loser
- Alt = Alternate
- SE = Special exempt
- PR = Protected ranking
- ITF = ITF entry
- JE = Junior exempt
- w/o = Walkover
- r = Retired
- d = Defaulted
- SR = Special ranking

=== Finals ===
Semifinals
5	(Chile) Nicolás Jarry	6	6
(Argentina) Federico Delbonis	3	2
6	(Argentina) Juan Ignacio Londero	6	6
(Spain) Albert Ramos Viñolas	3	4

Final
5	(Chile) Nicolás Jarry	7^{9}	6
6	(Argentina) Juan Ignacio Londero	6^{7}	4

=== Top half ===
First round
(France) J Chardy	6	4	7
Q	(Spain) P Carreño Busta	4	6	5
WC	(Spain) A Davidovich Fokina	6	5	0
WC	(Sweden) M Ymer	4	7	6
(Switzerland) H Laaksonen	6^{1}	5
5	(Chile) N Jarry	7^{7}	7
(Argentina) F Delbonis	7	3	6
Q	(Spain) B Zapata Miralles	5	6	2
(Brazil) T Monteiro	3	6	5
WC	(Sweden) E Ymer	6	2	7
PR	(Slovakia) J Kovalík	6^{3}	4
8	(Portugal) J Sousa	7^{7}	6

Second round
1	(Chile) C Garín	4	4
(France) J Chardy	6	6
WC	(Sweden) M Ymer	5	3
5	(Chile) N Jarry	7	6
3	(Uruguay) P Cuevas	4	4
(Argentina) F Delbonis	6	6
WC	(Sweden) E Ymer	6	4	2
8	(Portugal) J Sousa	4	6	6

Quarterfinals
(France) J Chardy	1	4
5	(Chile) N Jarry	6	6
(Argentina) F Delbonis	6	7
8	(Portugal) J Sousa	2	5

Semifinals
5	(Chile) N Jarry	6	6
(Argentina) F Delbonis	3	2

=== Bottom half ===
First round
6	(Argentina) JI Londero	6	6
Q	(Argentina) F Argüello	3	2
(Bolivia) H Dellien	6	2
(Latvia) E Gulbis	2	1^{r}
(Austria) D Novak	6	7
PR	(Belgium) S Darcis	2	5
7	(Norway) C Ruud	4	2
(Bosnia and Herzegovina) D Džumhur	6	6
(Spain) J Munar	4	6	3
(Spain) R Carballés Baena	6	3	6
Q	(France) C Lestienne	1	5
(Spain) A Ramos Viñolas	6	7

Second round
6	(Argentina) JI Londero	4	7	6
(Bolivia) H Dellien	6	5	3
(Austria) D Novak	6	3	4
4	(France) R Gasquet	4	6	6
(Bosnia and Herzegovina) D Džumhur	1	6^{4}
(Spain) R Carballés Baena	6	7^{7}
(Spain) A Ramos Viñolas	6	6
2	(Spain) F Verdasco	2	4

Quarterfinals
6	(Argentina) JI Londero	7^{7}	4	6
4	(France) R Gasquet	6^{5}	6	3
(Spain) R Carballés Baena	6	1	1
(Spain) A Ramos Viñolas	4	6	6

Semifinals
6	(Argentina) JI Londero	6	6
(Spain) A Ramos Viñolas	3	4

== Qualifying ==
=== Seeds ===
1. (Spain) Pablo Carreño Busta (qualified)
2. (Portugal) João Domingues (first round)
3. (Argentina) Facundo Argüello (qualified)
4. (Slovakia) Filip Horanský (first round)
5. (France) Constant Lestienne (qualified)
6. (Russia) Alexey Vatutin (qualifying competition)
7. (Canada) Steven Diez (qualifying competition)
8. (Ecuador) Roberto Quiroz (qualifying competition)

=== Qualifiers ===
1. (Spain) Pablo Carreño Busta
2. (France) Constant Lestienne
3. (Argentina) Facundo Argüello
4. (Spain) Bernabé Zapata Miralles

=== Qualifying draw ===
==== First qualifier ====
First round
1	(Spain) Pablo Carreño Busta	3	6	6
WC	(Sweden) Carl Söderlund	6	4	3
(Belgium) Yannick Mertens	1	2
8/Alt	(Ecuador) Roberto Quiroz	6	6

Qualifying competition
1	(Spain) Pablo Carreño Busta	7^{7}	7^{7}
8/Alt	(Ecuador) Roberto Quiroz	6^{1}	6^{5}

==== Second qualifier ====
First round
2	(Portugal) João Domingues	6^{4}	6	2
(Lithuania) Laurynas Grigelis	7^{7}	2	6
WC	(Sweden) John Hallquist Lithen	0	6^{1}
5	(France) Constant Lestienne	6	7^{7}

Qualifying competition
(Lithuania) Laurynas Grigelis	6	2	1
5	(France) Constant Lestienne	1	6	6

==== Third qualifier ====
First round
3	(Argentina) Facundo Argüello	7^{7}	6
Alt	(Sweden) Markus Eriksson	6^{4}	1
(Switzerland) Marc-Andrea Hüsler	5	3
7	(Canada) Steven Diez	7	6

Qualifying competition
3	(Argentina) Facundo Argüello	6	3	6
7	(Canada) Steven Diez	4	6	3

==== Fourth qualifier ====
First round
4	(Slovakia) Filip Horanský	3	4
(Spain) Bernabé Zapata Miralles	6	6
(Italy) Julian Ocleppo	2	2
6	(Russia) Alexey Vatutin	6	6

Qualifying competition
(Spain) Bernabé Zapata Miralles	6	6
6	(Russia) Alexey Vatutin	2	1
