= Nicolas Jarry =

Chilean tennis player (born 1995)

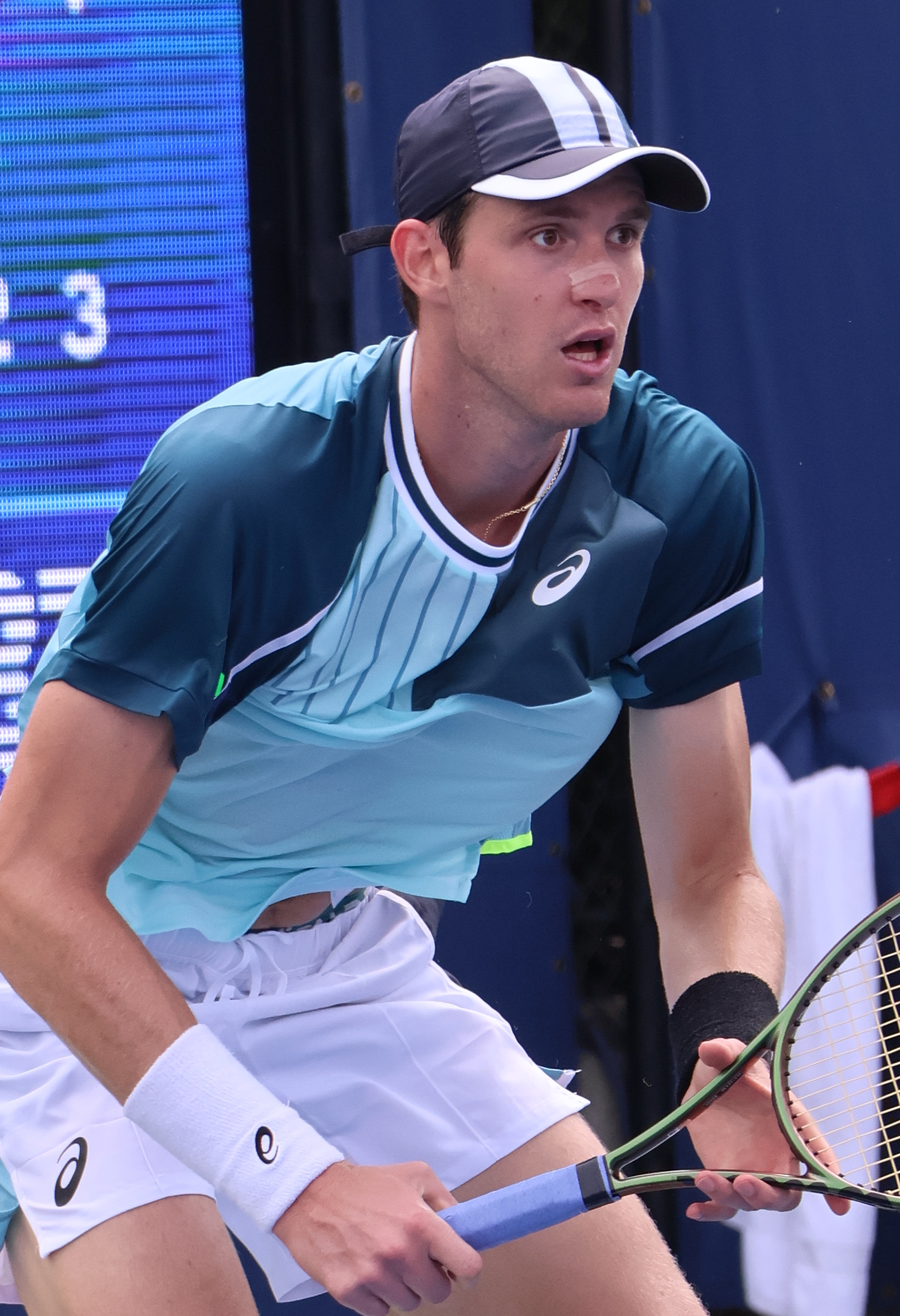
- Jarry at the 2023 US Open
- Country (sports): Chile
- Residence: Lo Barnechea, Santiago, Chile
- Born: 11 October 1995 (age 31) Santiago, Chile
- Height: 2.01 m (6 ft 7 in)
- Turned pro: 2014
- Plays: Right-handed (two-handed backhand)
- Coach: Juan Ignacio Chela, Cesar Fabregas (2024–)
- Prize money: US$ 7,511,368

Singles
- Career record: 123–129
- Career titles: 3
- Highest ranking: No. 16 (20 May 2024)
- Current ranking: No. 854 (19 October 2026)

Grand Slam singles results
- Australian Open: 2R (2023)
- French Open: 4R (2023)
- Wimbledon: 4R (2025)
- US Open: 3R (2023)

Other tournaments
- Olympic Games: 1R (2024)

Doubles
- Career record: 47–47
- Career titles: 2
- Highest ranking: No. 40 (18 March 2019)
- Current ranking: No. 575 (17 November 2025)

Grand Slam doubles results
- Australian Open: 3R (2019)
- French Open: QF (2018)
- Wimbledon: 3R (2018)
- US Open: QF (2018)

Other doubles tournaments
- Olympic Games: 2R (2024)
Medal record
Representing Chile
Men's tennis
Pan American Games
Gold medal – first place	2015 Toronto	Men's doubles
Gold medal – first place	2019 Lima	Mixed doubles
Bolivarian Games
Gold medal – first place	2013 Trujillo	Men's Nations Cup
South American Games
Silver medal – second place	2014 Santiago	Mixed doubles
- Last updated on: 17 November 2025.

Nicolas Jarry Fillol (Spanish pronunciation: [nikoˈlas ˈʝari]; (Note: In isolation, Jarry is pronounced [ˈɟʝari].) born 11 October 1995) is a Chilean professional tennis player. He has a career-high ATP singles ranking of world No. 16, achieved on 20 May 2024, and a doubles ranking of No. 40, attained on 18 March 2019. He is currently the No. 9 singles player from Chile.

Jarry has won three ATP Tour titles in singles, at Båstad 2019, Santiago 2023 and Geneva 2023, and also reached a Masters 1000 final at the 2024 Italian Open. He has also won two ATP doubles titles.

== Personal life ==
Jarry is the grandson of Jaime Fillol, a former ATP player who won seven titles, and the great-nephew of Álvaro Fillol. His uncle, Jaime Fillol Jr., also played professionally, and his aunt, Catalina Fillol, is the tournament director of the Chile Open in Santiago, Chile. Another uncle, Martín Rodríguez, represented Argentina on the professional tour. His cousin, Martín Sáenz, is a track and field athlete who specializes in the 110 metre hurdles.

In 2020, Jarry married economist Laura Urruticoechea, with whom he has two sons: Juan (b. 2022) and Santiago (b. 2023).

Jarry has experienced respiratory issues throughout his career, including a deviated septum, inflamed turbinates, and allergies, causing him to often wear nasal strips during matches.

== Career ==
=== Junior and early career ===
Jarry reached the final of the 2013 French Open in boys' doubles, partnering with Cristian Garín. The pair were later defeated by Kyle Edmund and Frederico Ferreira Silva. Jarry ended the year at No. 18 in the junior rankings.

Jarry was called for the Chile Davis Cup team for the first time in September 2013 in the rubber against Dominican Republic. Chile lost and was relegated to the Group II of the Americas Zone.

=== 2015–16: Professional and top 200 debuts, constant injuries ===
In February 2015, Jarry played his first match at an ATP Tour tournament after qualifying in the 2015 Ecuador Open Quito. He won his first match against local Gonzalo Escobar, but in the second round, he lost to Dušan Lajović. The points he earned in this tournament helped him reach a top 200 position in the ATP ranking, although he lost position throughout the year due to constant injuries.

At the end of 2016, Jarry won three ITF Futures in his home country (two of them in consecutive weeks), ending the year as No. 330.

=== 2017: Three Challenger titles, major & top 100 debuts ===
Jarry started his 2017 with a final at the Morelos Open and another one in Santiago. After these two lost finals, he was able to enter the qualifying competition for the 2017 French Open, where he won all the matches and entered the main tournament. In his first match in a major, he lost in four sets to Karen Khachanov. Jarry repeated the success in the qualifying competition for 2017 Wimbledon Championships, reaching the main draw and losing to Gilles Simon in straight sets. In the second half of the year, he won three Challenger tournaments: at Medellín, Quito, and Santiago.

Jarry ended the year as No. 100.

=== 2018: First ATP Tour finals & top 40, maiden doubles title ===
Jarry entered a Grand Slam main draw directly for the first time in 2018 Australian Open but lost in straight sets to Leonardo Mayer. After Australia, Nicolas played for Chile in Davis Cup competition, winning his two singles matches against Ecuador and partnering with Hans Podlipnik for a victory in doubles, resulting in a 3–1 win for Chile.

The following week, Nicolas participated in 2018 Ecuador Open Quito, where he reached the quarterfinals of an ATP Tour tournament for the first time. Jarry repeated his partnership with Podlipnik in the doubles tournament, and they won the championship, a maiden career title for both.

Two weeks after Quito, Jarry surpassed his best results at the 2018 Rio Open, reaching his first semifinal of an ATP tournament but losing against eventual champion Diego Schwartzman. The next tournament, he reached his first ATP final at the 2018 Brasil Open. He lost in the final to Fabio Fognini. This effort took him to career-best ranking of world No. 61.

After reaching the quarterfinals at the 2018 Estoril Open and losing in the first round of the 2018 French Open, Jarry won his first match in a Grand Slam tournament at Wimbledon, defeating 28th seed Filip Krajinović in four sets. He lost to Mackenzie McDonald in five sets in the second round. A few weeks later at the 2018 German Open quarterfinals, Jarry had the best win of his career up to that moment, toppling top seed Dominic Thiem, in straight sets before losing in the semifinals.

In the following months, Jarry had good runs in small tournaments, reaching the semifinals in 2018 German Open and in 2018 Generali Open Kitzbühel, and the quarterfinals in 2018 Winston-Salem Open. With these results, Jarry jumped to the No. 42 in the rankings. In his first US Open, he reached the second round in singles and the quarterfinals in doubles. After the US Open, the only notable result for Jarry was reaching the third round of 2018 Shanghai Masters, where he defeated Marin Čilić in three sets in the second round, having the best win of his career yet. He lost to Kyle Edmund in the following round. With the points from this achievement, weeks later, he would get to world No. 39. Prior to that, he served as the alternate for Team World at the 2018 Laver Cup in Chicago.

=== 2019: First ATP Tour singles title ===
Jarry lost in four sets to Leonardo Mayer in their second consecutive first round match at Australian Open. He won his two singles points against Jurij Rodionov and Dennis Novak in the series of Chile against Austria for 2019 Davis Cup, with another win from Cristian Garín, the Chilean team earned their spot at the 2019 Davis Cup Finals, at the end of the year.

In the third round of the Barcelona Open, Jarry defeated second seed and then ATP No. 3 Alexander Zverev in three sets, marking a new best win of his career. Jarry lost in the following round to Daniil Medvedev. One month later, he and Zverev would clash again in the final of the 2019 Geneva Open, extending again the match until the tiebreak of the third set, but Zverev emerged victorious 6–3, 3–6, 7–6^{(10–8)}. The following week, Jarry lost in the first round of the 2019 French Open in four sets to eighth seed Juan Martín del Potro.

After a regular grass-court season which featured the quarterfinals in the Rosmalen Open and wins over Stefanos Tsitsipas and Pablo Cuevas, Jarry went back to clay in July. At the Swedish Open, he lifted his first ATP Tour title, after defeating Henri Laaksonen, Mikael Ymer, Jérémy Chardy, Federico Delbonis and Juan Ignacio Londero without losing a single set, completing the best week of his career so far and reaching a new career-high ranking of World No. 38 on 22 July 2019.

=== 2020–21: Provisional suspension and return, two Challengers titles ===
During the Davis Cup Finals in late 2019, Jarry tested positive for Ligandrol and Stanozolol. He was suspended from competition as of 14 January 2020 but subsequently cleared as the ITF ruled that Jarry "bore no significant fault or negligence for his violation." The ban expired on 15 November 2020, with Jarry entering the 2020 Lima Challenger via wildcards in singles and doubles.

In 2021, Jarry played many ATP and Challenger tournaments in South America via wildcards. He defeated Jaume Munar at Córdoba, losing to Benoît Paire on second round. The following week, Jarry lost to Frances Tiafoe at the home city tournament Santiago after defending six match points.

In April 2021, he won a Challenger at Salinas and reached the final on another one in the same city. Three months later, he reached another final at Lüdenscheid, Germany. In October, Jarry won his second Challenger of the year at Lima. He defeated Juan Manuel Cerúndolo 6–2, 7–5 in the final. This title moved Jarry to World No. 162 on 1 November 2021.

=== 2022: Return to Majors, back to top 150 ===
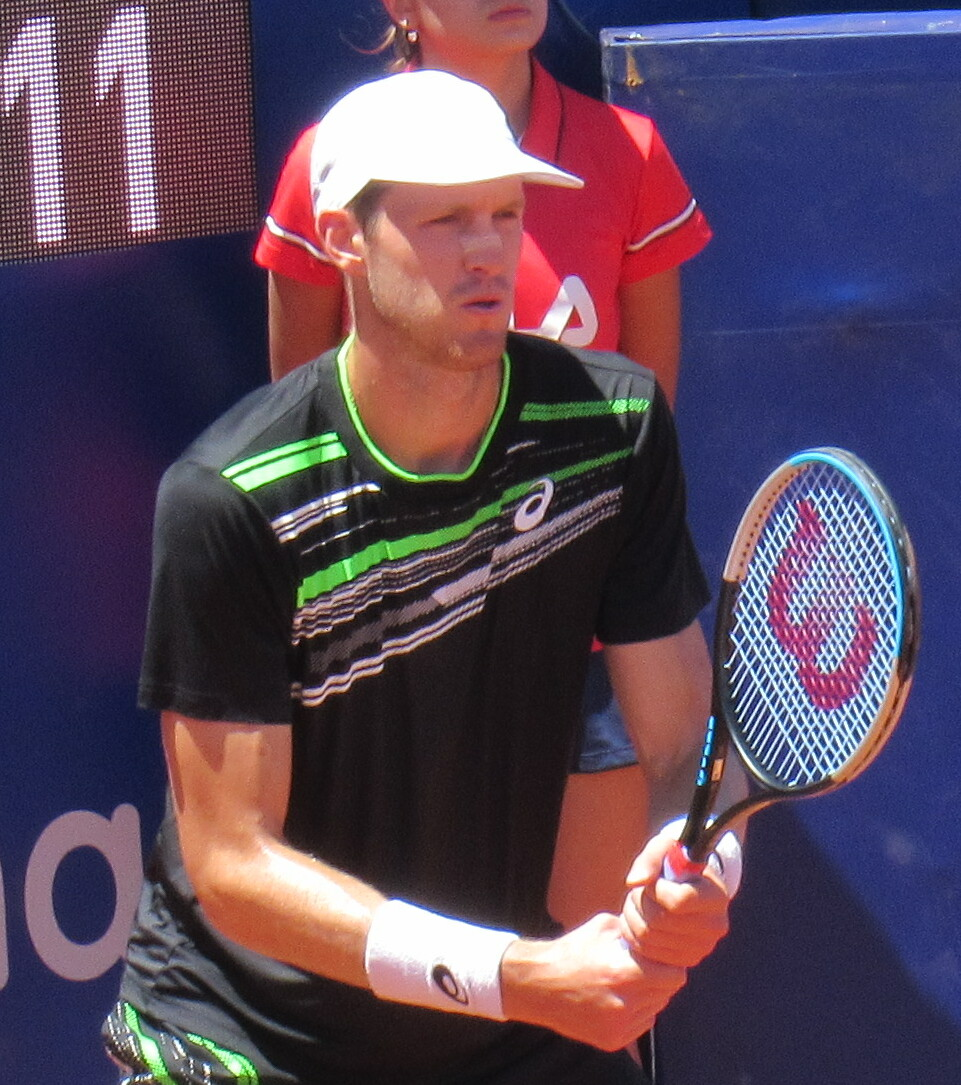
Jarry at the 2022 Córdoba Open, in Argentina.

Jarry started the year by making the main draw of Córdoba and Buenos Aires coming from the qualifying draw, but in both instances, he lost in the first round. He also received a wild card in his home tournament, Santiago, but he also lost in the first round.

In May, he participated in the Roland Garros qualifying rounds but lost in the third round to Juan Pablo Varillas in three sets. At the 2022 Swiss Open Gstaad, he reached the quarterfinals as a qualifier, where he lost to Albert Ramos Viñolas in a tight three sets match. As a result, he reached world No. 104 on 1 August 2022, his highest ranking since the 2020 suspension.

After a two-year absence, he qualified for the US Open but lost in the first round to 13th seed Matteo Berrettini. He qualified for the main draw of the Seoul and reached the second round, losing to world No. 2, Casper Ruud, in three sets. He finished 2022 ranked No. 141.

=== 2023: Two titles, return to Masters & first quarterfinal, top 20, Latin American No. 1 ===
After three years of absence, Jarry qualified for the 2023 Australian Open. He won his first match at this major and in more than four years at any major, defeating 26th seed Miomir Kecmanović.

Ranked No. 139 at the 2023 Rio Open, he recorded his biggest win of the season thus far, defeating world No. 18, Lorenzo Musetti, in the first round. Next, he defeated Pedro Martínez to return to the quarterfinals at this tournament in five years (since 2018), this time as a qualifier. As a result, he moved close to 40 positions up the rankings, a couple of positions shy of the top 100. Next, he defeated 6th seed Sebastián Báez to reach his first ATP semifinal in more than three years (since Båstad in July 2019). He moved another 15 positions, for a total of 52 positions to No. 87 in the rankings on 27 February 2023 becoming the Chilean No. 1 player. He lost to top seed and world No. 2 Carlos Alcaraz in three sets. The following week, he received a special exempt (SE) (having reached the semifinals the week before) to play in his home tournament, the 2023 Chile Open in Santiago. His good form continued as he defeated Peruvian Juan Pablo Varillas in the first round. Next, he defeated fourth seed Diego Schwartzman to make the quarterfinals. He reached back-to-back semifinals defeating Yannick Hanfmann. He reached his first final since 2019, defeating third seed Jaume Munar. As a result, he returned to the top 70 in the rankings. In the final, he defeated first time ATP finalist Tomás Martín Etcheverry in three sets to win his second title, this time on home soil. As a result, he returned to the top 60 at world No. 52 on 6 March 2023, 100 spots higher than he started the season.

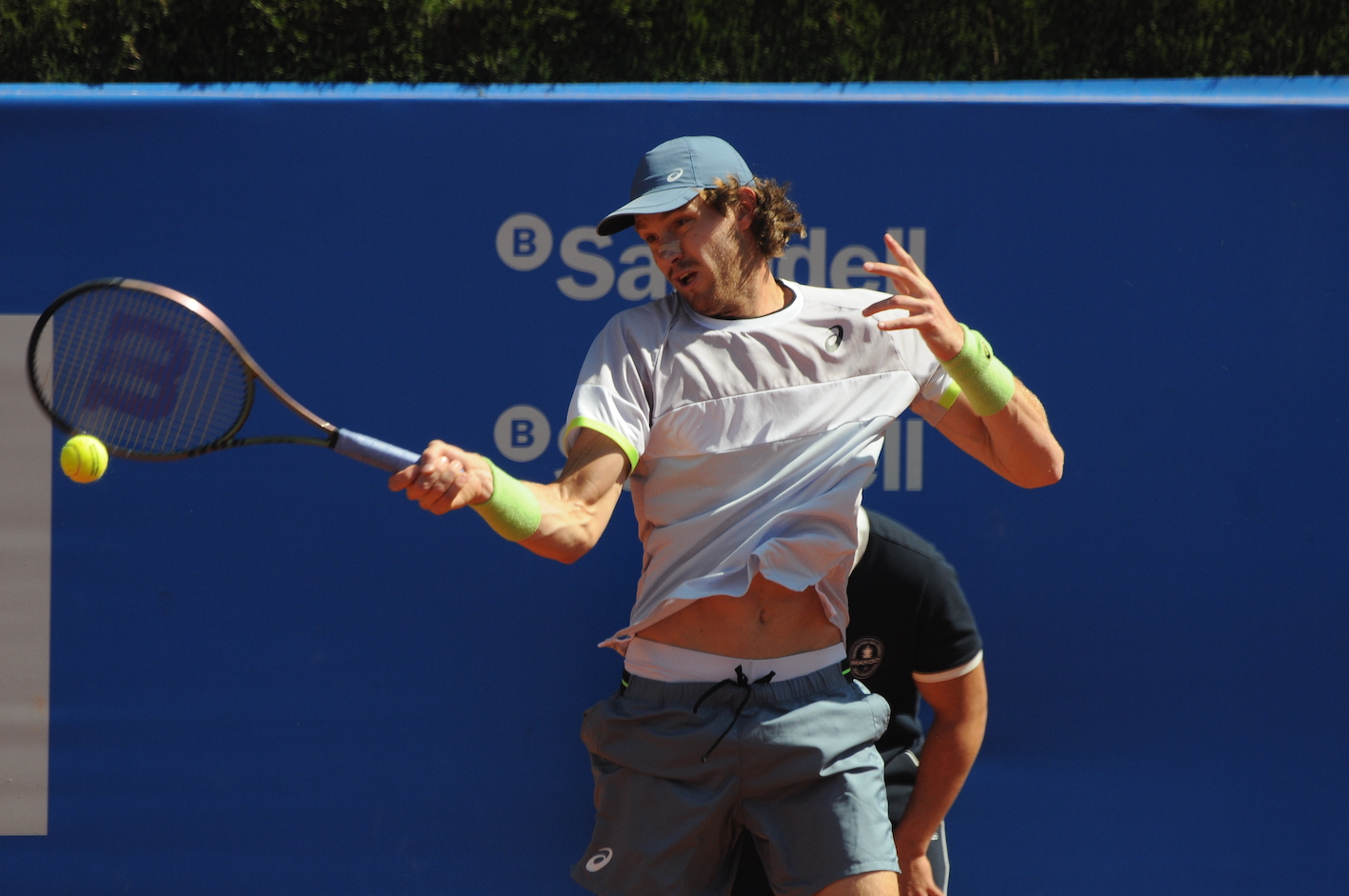
Jarry at the 2023 Barcelona Open

On his debut at the Monte-Carlo Masters, he defeated 15th seed Borna Ćorić in the first round for his second top-20 win of the season and first Masters win in five years. Next, he defeated Alexei Popyrin to reach the third round of a Masters only for the second time in his career. He made his debut in Madrid. He lost in the first round in Rome. At the 2023 Geneva Open, he reached the quarterfinals after a win over Dušan Lajović and a walkover from sixth seed Tallon Griekspoor. He then reached his third semifinal of the season by defeating top seed Casper Ruud for his first top-5 win of the season, his fifth top-10 win overall and first since 2019. He defeated third seed Alexander Zverev in a rematch of the 2019 final in the semifinals to reach the second final of his season, where he defeated fourth seed Grigor Dimitrov to win his second title of 2023. As a result, he reached a career-high ranking of world No. 35 on 29 May 2023. At the French Open, Jarry made his deepest run at a Grand Slam, after defeating Hugo Dellien and 16th seed Tommy Paul. He defeated Marcos Giron in four sets in the third round to reach the fourth round. He lost to fourth seed Casper Ruud. As a result, Jarry entered the top 30 for the first time in his career on 12 June 2023.

He continued his good form on grass at the 2023 Halle Open, where he reached the quarterfinals, defeating Corentin Moutet and upsetting second seed and world No. 5 Stefanos Tsitsipas, his sixth career victory against a Top 10 opponent. At the 2023 Wimbledon Championships, he reached the third round for the first time at this major, defeating Marco Cecchinato and Jason Kubler.

Jarry's next tournament was Los Cabos, where he defeated wildcard Rodrigo Pacheco Méndez and Gijs Brouwer to reach his fifth quarterfinal of 2023. He lost to Stefanos Tsitsipas in three sets in the quarterfinals. In Toronto, Jarry lost to Ugo Humbert in three sets, in the first round.

In Cincinnati, he defeated Roman Safiullin but withdrew from his second-round match against Alexei Popyrin due to the birth of his second son. At the US Open, as the 23rd seed, Jarry continued his streak of major third rounds, beating Luca Van Assche and Alex Michelsen, before losing to 13th seed Alex de Minaur, in straight sets.

In Beijing, Jarry once again upset fourth seed Stefanos Tsitsipas in straight sets for the third top 10 win of his season. He reached the quarterfinals with a win over qualifier Matteo Arnaldi. At the 2023 Rolex Shanghai Masters, he reached the quarterfinals for the first time at a Masters level defeating Lorenzo Sonego and wildcard Diego Schwartzman. As a result, he moved one position ahead of Argentine Francisco Cerúndolo at a new career-high of world No. 21, becoming the Latin American No. 1 player on 16 October, and to the top 20 a week later, becoming the seventh Chilean player to reach that milestone.

=== 2024: 100th career win, a win over world No. 2, first Masters final, and flag bearer at Olympics ===
At the 2024 Argentina Open, he reached the quarterfinals defeating Stan Wawrinka for his 100th career win, one of only eight Chilean men in the Open Era to hit that number—a list which also includes his grandfather Jaime Fillol. Next he reached the semifinals after sixth seed Tomás Martín Etcheverry retired with an injury. He reached his sixth final by defeating the top seed and world No. 2, Carlos Alcaraz, in straight sets, his eighth top-10 win.

At the 2024 Miami Open he reached his second Masters quarterfinal with wins over Jack Draper, Thiago Seyboth Wild, and world No. 8 and seventh seed, Casper Ruud, in straight sets.

At the 2024 Italian Open, he reached his third Masters quarterfinal with wins over three unseeded players Matteo Arnaldi, wildcard Stefano Napolitano and qualifier Alexandre Muller. He reached his first Masters 1000 semifinal in his career defeating sixth seed and world No. 8, Stefanos Tsitsipas, in three sets, his tenth career top 10 win, and fifth on clay. It was also the first time multiple Chilean players (with Alejandro Tabilo) reached the semifinals at the same Masters 1000 and the first time at an ATP tour event since Fernando González and Nicolas Massu in Vina del Mar in 2006. He reached his first Masters final with a win over 14th seed Tommy Paul in three sets, becoming the first Chilean to reach a Masters final since González in 2007 also in Rome. He lost the final to Alexander Zverev in two sets. With this result, Jarry reached a new career-high ranking of world No. 16.

On 8 July 2024, the Chilean Olympic Committee chose him and rower Antonia Abraham as the flag bearers for the París 2024 Olympic Games.

=== 2025: Wimbledon fourth round, back to top 100 ===
At the 2025 Wimbledon Championships, ranked No. 143, Jarry qualified for the main draw after wins over Pavel Kotov, Jozef Kovalík, and Lukáš Klein. In the main draw, he surprised eight seed Holger Rune over an upset in the first round. Following wins over teenage stars Learner Tien and João Fonseca, he then reached the fourth round at the tournament for the first time and lost to eventual quarterfinalist Cameron Norrie. As a result, he returned to the top 100 in the singles rankings on 14 July 2025.

== Performance timelines ==
Key
W	F	SF	QF	#R	RR	Q#	P#	DNQ	A	Z#	PO	G	S	B	NMS	NTI	P	NH

(W) winner; (F) finalist; (SF) semifinalist; (QF) quarterfinalist; (#R) rounds 4, 3, 2, 1; (RR) round-robin stage; (Q#) qualification round; (P#) preliminary round; (DNQ) did not qualify; (A) absent; (Z#) Davis/Fed Cup Zonal Group (with number indication) or (PO) play-off; (G) gold, (S) silver or (B) bronze Olympic/Paralympic medal; (NMS) not a Masters tournament; (NTI) not a Tier I tournament; (P) postponed; (NH) not held; (SR) strike rate (events won / competed); (W–L) win–loss record.
To avoid confusion and double counting, these charts are updated at the conclusion of a tournament or when the player's participation has ended.

=== Singles ===
Tournament	2013	2014	2015	2016	2017	2018	2019	2020	2021	2022	2023	2024	2025	2026	SR	W–L	Win%
Grand Slam tournaments
Australian Open	A	A	Q1	A	A	1R	1R	A	A	A	2R	1R	1R	Q1	0 / 5	1–5	17%
French Open	A	A	Q1	A	1R	1R	1R	A	A	Q3	4R	1R	1R	A	0 / 6	3–6	33%
Wimbledon	A	A	Q1	A	1R	2R	1R	NH	A	A	3R	1R	4R	A	0 / 6	6–6	50%
US Open	A	A	Q1	A	Q2	2R	1R	A	A	1R	3R	1R	1R		0 / 6	3–6	33%
Win–loss	0–0	0–0	0–0	0–0	0–2	2–4	0–4	0–0	0–0	0–1	8–4	0–4	3–4	0–0	0 / 23	13–23	36%
National representation
Summer Olympics	NH			A	NH				A	NH		1R	NH		0 / 1	0–1	0%
Davis Cup	Z1	A	Z2	PO	Z1	Z1	GS	A	WG1	WG1	GS	RR	A		0 / 1	14–10	58%
ATP Tour Masters 1000
Indian Wells Open	A	A	A	A	A	A	2R	NH	A	A	A	2R	A	Q1	0 / 2	1–2	33%
Miami Open	A	A	A	1R	A	2R	1R	NH	A	A	A	QF	A	Q1	0 / 4	4–4	50%
Monte-Carlo Masters	A	A	A	A	A	A	A	NH	A	A	3R	1R	1R		0 / 3	2–3	40%
Madrid Open	A	A	A	A	A	A	Q1	NH	A	A	1R	2R	2R		0 / 3	1–3	25%
Italian Open	A	A	A	A	A	1R	Q2	A	A	A	1R	F	2R		0 / 4	6–4	60%
Canadian Open	A	A	A	A	A	A	A	NH	A	A	1R	1R	A		0 / 2	0–2	0%
Cincinnati Open	A	A	A	A	A	A	A	A	A	A	2R (Note: Withdrawal of tournament, doesn't count as a lost match.)	1R	1R		0 / 3	1–2	33%
Shanghai Masters	A	A	A	A	Q1	3R	Q1	NH			QF	2R	A		0 / 3	5–3	63%
Paris Masters	A	A	A	A	A	Q1	A	A	A	A	2R	2R	A		0 / 2	2–2	50%
Win–loss	0–0	0–0	0–0	0–1	0–0	3–3	1–2	0–0	0–0	0–0	7–6	9–9	2–4	0–0	0 / 26	22–25	47%
Career statistics
	2013	2014	2015	2016	2017	2018	2019	2020	2021	2022	2023	2024	2025	2026	Career		
Tournaments	0	0	2	2	2	21	20	0	2	8	23	23	14		117		
Titles / Finals	0 / 0	0 / 0	0 / 0	0 / 0	0 / 0	0 / 1	1 / 2	0 / 0	0 / 0	0 / 0	2 / 2	0 / 2	0 / 0		3 / 7		
Overall W–L	0–1	0–0	3–2	0–4	2–3	27–22	19–21	0–3	1–3	5–9	38–19	19–24	9–14		123–125		
Year-end ranking	830	222	372	330	111	43	77	—	160	141	19	35	121		49.6%		

=== Doubles ===
Tournament	2013	2014	2015	2016	2017	2018	2019	2020	2021	2022	2023	SR	W–L
Grand Slam tournaments
Australian Open	A	A	A	A	A	A	3R	A	A	A	A	0 / 1	2–1
French Open	A	A	A	A	A	QF	A	A	A	A	2R	0 / 2	4–2
Wimbledon	A	A	A	A	A	3R	1R	NH	A	A	A	0 / 2	2–2
US Open	A	A	A	A	A	QF	1R	A	A	A	A	0 / 2	3–2
Win–loss	0–0	0–0	0–0	0–0	0–0	8–3	2–3	0–0	0–0	0–0	1–1	0 / 7	11–7
ATP Tour Masters 1000
Miami Open	A	A	A	A	A	A	2R	NH	A	A	A	0 / 1	1–1
Win–loss	0–0	0–0	0–0	0–0	0–0	0–0	1–1	0–0	0–0	0–0	0–0	0 / 1	1–1
National representation
Davis Cup	Z1	A	Z2	PO	Z1	Z1	GS	A	A			0 / 0	5–4
Career statistics
Titles / Finals	0 / 0	0 / 0	0 / 0	0 / 0	0 / 0	1 / 1	1 / 1	0 / 0	0 / 0	0 / 0	0 / 0	2 / 2	
Overall win–loss	0–2	1–1	1–1	1–1	1–1	18–10	12–12	2–1	1–1	1–1	2–3	40–34	
Year-end ranking	698	162	583	212	180	50	69	–	309	321		54.05%	

== Significant finals ==
=== ATP 1000 tournaments ===
==== Singles: 1 (runner-up) ====
Result	Year	Tournament	Surface	Opponent	Score
Loss	2024	Italian Open	Clay	(Germany) Alexander Zverev	4–6, 5–7

== ATP Tour finals ==
=== Singles: 7 (3 titles, 4 runner-ups) ===
Legend Grand Slam ATP 1000 (0–1) ATP 500 (0–0) ATP 250 (3–3)	Finals by surface Hard (0–0) Clay (3–4) Grass (0–0)	Finals by setting Outdoor (3–3) Indoor (0–1)

Result	W–L	Date	Tournament	Tier	Surface	Opponent	Score
Loss	0–1	Mar 2018	Brasil Open, Brazil	ATP 250	Clay (i)	(Italy) Fabio Fognini	6–1, 1–6, 4–6
Loss	0–2	May 2019	Geneva Open, Switzerland	ATP 250	Clay	(Germany) Alexander Zverev	3–6, 6–3, 6–7^{(8–10)}
Win	1–2	Jul 2019	Swedish Open, Sweden	ATP 250	Clay	(Argentina) Juan Ignacio Londero	7–6^{(9–7)}, 6–4
Win	2–2	Mar 2023	Chile Open, Chile	ATP 250	Clay	(Argentina) Tomás Martín Etcheverry	6–7^{(5–7)}, 7–6^{(7–5)}, 6–2
Win	3–2	May 2023	Geneva Open, Switzerland	ATP 250	Clay	(Bulgaria) Grigor Dimitrov	7–6^{(7–1)}, 6–1
Loss	3–3	Feb 2024	Argentina Open, Argentina	ATP 250	Clay	(Argentina) Facundo Díaz Acosta	3–6, 4–6
Loss	3–4	May 2024	Italian Open, Italy	ATP 1000	Clay	(Germany) Alexander Zverev	4–6, 5–7

=== Doubles: 2 (2 titles) ===
Legend Grand Slam ATP 1000 ATP 500 (1–0) ATP 250 (1–0)	Finals by surface Hard (0–0) Clay (2–0) Grass (0–0)	Finals by setting Outdoor (2–0) Indoor (0–0)

Result	W–L	Date	Tournament	Tier	Surface	Partner	Opponents	Score
Win	1–0	Feb 2018	Quito Open, Ecuador	ATP 250	Clay	(Chile) Hans Podlipnik	(United States) Austin Krajicek (United States) Jackson Withrow	7–6^{(8–6)}, 6–3
Win	2–0	Feb 2019	Rio Open, Brazil	ATP 500	Clay	(Argentina) Máximo González	(Brazil) Thomaz Bellucci (Brazil) Rogério Dutra Silva	6–7^{(3–7)}, 6–3, [10–7]

== ATP Challenger Tour finals ==
Up===Singles: 10 (5 titles, 5 runner-ups)===

Legend ATP Challenger Tour (5–5)	Finals by surface Hard (1–2) Clay (4–3)

Result	W–L	Date	Tournament	Tier	Surface	Opponent	Score
Loss	0–1	Sep 2014	Quito Challenger, Ecuador	Challenger	Clay	(Argentina) Horacio Zeballos	4–6, 6–7^{(8–10)}
Loss	0–2	Feb 2017	Morelos Open, Mexico	Challenger	Hard	(Kazakhstan) Alexander Bublik	6–7^{(5–7)}, 4–6
Loss	0–3	Mar 2017	Cachantún Cup, Chile	Challenger	Clay	(Brazil) Rogério Dutra Silva	5–7, 3–6
Win	1–3	Jul 2017	Medellín Open, Colombia	Challenger	Clay	(Brazil) João Souza	6–1, 3–6, 7–6^{(7–0)}
Win	2–3	Sep 2017	Quito Challenger, Ecuador	Challenger	Clay	(Austria) Gerald Melzer	6–3, 6–2
Win	3–3	Nov 2017	Santiago Challenger, Chile	Challenger	Clay	(El Salvador) Marcelo Arévalo	6–1, 7–5
Win	4–3	Apr 2021	Salinas Challenger, Ecuador	Challenger	Hard	(Colombia) Nicolás Mejía	7–6^{(9–7)}, 6–1
Loss	4–4	May 2021	Salinas Challenger II, Ecuador	Challenger	Hard	(Ecuador) Emilio Gómez	6–4, 6–7^{(6–8)}, 4–6
Loss	4–5	Aug 2021	Platzmann-Sauerland Open, Germany	Challenger	Clay	(Germany) Daniel Altmaier	6–7^{(1–7)}, 6–4, 3–6
Win	5–5	Oct 2021	Lima Challenger II, Peru	Challenger	Clay	(Argentina) Juan Manuel Cerúndolo	6–2, 7–5

=== Doubles: 11 (8 titles, 3 runner-ups) ===
Legend ATP Challenger Tour (8–3)	Finals by surface Hard (0–0) Clay (8–3)

Result	W–L	Date	Tournament	Tier	Surface	Partner	Opponents	Score
Win	1–0	Apr 2014	Cachantún Cup, Chile	Challenger	Clay	(Chile) Cristian Garín	(Chile) Jorge Aguilar (Chile) Hans Podlipnik Castillo	walkover
Win	2–0	Oct 2014	Copa de Córdoba, Argentina	Challenger	Clay	(Brazil) Marcelo Demoliner	(Bolivia) Hugo Dellien (Argentina) Juan Ignacio Londero	6–3, 7–5
Loss	2–1	Nov 2014	Uruguay Open, Uruguay	Challenger	Clay	(Chile) Gonzalo Lama	(Uruguay) Pablo Cuevas (Uruguay) Martín Cuevas	2–6, 4–6
Win	3–1	Jul 2016	Cali Open, Colombia	Challenger	Clay	(Chile) Hans Podlipnik Castillo	(Italy) Erik Crepaldi (Brazil) Daniel Dutra da Silva	6–1, 7–6^{(8–6)}
Win	4–1	Mar 2017	Cachantún Cup, Chile (2)	Challenger	Clay	(Chile) Tomás Barrios Vera	(Argentina) Máximo González (Argentina) Andrés Molteni	6–4, 6–3
Loss	4–2	Jul 2017	Medellín Open, Colombia	Challenger	Clay	(Ecuador) Roberto Quiroz	(Barbados) Darian King (Mexico) Miguel Ángel Reyes-Varela	4–6, 4–6
Win	5–2	Aug 2017	Abierto de Floridablanca, Colombia	Challenger	Clay	(Peru) Sergio Galdós	(United States) Sekou Bangoura (United States) Evan King	6–3, 5–7, [10–1]
Loss	5–3	Sep 2017	Quito Challenger, Ecuador	Challenger	Clay	(Ecuador) Roberto Quiroz	(El Salvador) Marcelo Arévalo (Mexico) Miguel Ángel Reyes-Varela	6–4, 4–6, [7–10]
Win	6–3	Oct 2021	Santiago Challenger II, Chile	Challenger	Clay	(Ecuador) Diego Hidalgo	(United States) Evan King (United States) Max Schnur	6–3, 5–7, [10–6]
Win	7–3	Oct 2021	Open Bogotá, Colombia	Challenger	Clay	(Ecuador) Roberto Quiroz	(Colombia) Nicolas Barrientos (Colombia) Alejandro Gómez	6–7^{(4–7)}, 7–5, [10–4]
Win	8–3	Apr 2022	Mexico City Open, Mexico	Challenger	Clay	(Brazil) Matheus Pucinelli de Almeida	(France) Jonathan Eysseric (New Zealand) Artem Sitak	6–2, 6–3

== ITF Tour finals ==
=== Singles: 11 (6 titles, 5 runner-ups) ===
Legend ITF Futures (6–5)	Finals by surface Hard (0–0) Clay (6–5)

Result	W–L	Date	Tournament	Tier	Surface	Opponent	Score
Loss	0–1	Jan 2014	Argentina F1, Villa Carlos Paz	Futures	Clay	(Argentina) Andrea Collarini	6–3, 0–6, 2–6
Loss	0–2	Mar 2014	Chile F1, Santiago	Futures	Clay	(Chile) Gonzalo Lama	1–6, 2–6
Win	1–2	May 2014	USA F13, Orange Park	Futures	Clay	(United States) Mitchell Krueger	6–1, 7–6^{(8–6)}
Loss	1–3	Jun 2014	Spain F12, Madrid	Futures	Clay	(Chile) Cristian Garín	6–3, 3–6, 1–6
Loss	1–4	Jun 2014	Serbia F3, Šabac	Futures	Clay	(Serbia) Peđa Krstin	7–5, 4–6, 6–7^{(5–7)}
Win	2–4	Jul 2014	Germany F6, Saarlouis	Futures	Clay	(Germany) Mats Moraing	6–4, 4–6, 6–4
Loss	2–5	Aug 2016	Romania F13, Mediaș	Futures	Clay	(Netherlands) Miliaan Niesten	7–6^{(7–3)}, 2–6, 6–7^{(4–7)}
Win	3–5	Aug 2016	Romania F14, Galați	Futures	Clay	(Argentina) Gabriel Alejandro Hidalgo	6–3, 6–1
Win	4–5	Dec 2016	Chile F5, Talca	Futures	Clay	(Chile) Bastian Malla	6–1, 7–6^{(7–3)}
Win	5–5	Dec 2016	Chile F7, Talca	Futures	Clay	(Chile) Cristóbal Saavedra Corvalán	2–6, 6–1, 6–4
Win	6–5	Dec 2016	Chile F8, Santiago	Futures	Clay	(Chile) Bastian Malla	6–3, 6–3

=== Doubles: 12 (7 titles, 5 runner-ups) ===
Legend ITF Futures (7–5)	Finals by surface Hard (0–1) Clay (7–4)

Result	W–L	Date	Tournament	Tier	Surface	Partner	Opponents	Score
Win	1–0	Oct 2012	Chile F10	Futures	Clay	(Chile) Gonzalo Lama	(Argentina) Gabriel Alejandro Hidalgo (Argentina) Mauricio Pérez Mota	5–7, 6–3, 10–4
Win	2–0	Apr 2013	Chile F3	Futures	Clay	(Chile) Cristian Garín	(Chile) Guillermo Rivera Aránguiz (Chile) Cristóbal Saavedra Corvalán	6–2, 6–2
Loss	2–1	Nov 2013	Chile F9	Futures	Clay	(Chile) Simón Navarro	(Argentina) Pedro Cachín (Chile) Guillermo Núñez	5–7, 3–6
Loss	2–2	Mar 2014	Chile F9	Futures	Clay	(Chile) Guillermo Núñez	(Chile) Guillermo Rivera Aránguiz (Chile) Cristóbal Saavedra Corvalán	4–6, 6–4, 6–10
Win	3–2	May 2014	USA F14	Futures	Clay	(Brazil) Tiago Lopes	(United States) Bjorn Fratangelo (United States) Mitchell Krueger	7–5, 6–1
Loss	3–3	Jul 2014	Germany F7	Futures	Clay	(Chile) Simón Navarro	(Poland) Andriej Kapaś (Poland) Błażej Koniusz	4–6, 2–6
Loss	3–4	Aug 2014	Brazil F7	Futures	Clay	(Chile) Jorge Aguilar	(Brazil) Rafael Matos (Brazil) Fabrício Neis	7–5, 1–6, 6–10
Win	4–4	Aug 2014	Colombia F4	Futures	Clay	(Brazil) Fabiano de Paula	(United States) Dean O'Brien (Colombia) Juan Carlos Spir	2–6, 6–2, 11–9
Win	5–4	Feb 2016	USA F6	Futures	Clay	(Chile) Juan Carlos Sáez	(Hungary) Péter Nagy (United States) Will Spencer	6–1, 6–2
Win	6–4	Aug 2016	Romania F13	Futures	Clay	(Chile) Simón Navarro	(Romania) Victor-Mugurel Anagnastopol (Romania) Victor Vlad Cornea	6–3, 6–4
Loss	6–5	Sep 2016	Canada F9	Futures	Hard (i)	(Ecuador) Iván Endara	(Canada) Filip Peliwo (Canada) Brayden Schnur	3–6, 3–6
Win	7–5	Dec 2016	Chile F8	Futures	Clay	(Chile) Guillermo Núñez	(Chile) Carlos Cuevas (Argentina) Juan Pablo Paz	6–3, 7–5

== Junior Grand Slam finals ==
=== Doubles: 1 (runner-up) ===
Result	Year	Tournament	Surface	Partner	Opponents	Score
Loss	2013	French Open	Clay	(Chile) Cristian Garín	(United Kingdom) Kyle Edmund (Portugal) Frederico Ferreira Silva	3–6, 3–6

== Wins against Top 10 players ==
- Jarry has a 10–12 record against players who were, at the time the match was played, ranked in the top 10.

Season	2014	2015	2016	2017	2018	2019	2020	2021	2022	2023	2024	2025	Total
Wins	0	0	0	0	2	2	0	0	0	3	3	1	11

#	Opponent	Rk	Event	Surface	Rd	Score	Rk	Ref
2018
1.	(Austria) Dominic Thiem	8	German Open, Germany	Clay	QF	7–6^{(7–5)}, 7–6^{(9–7)}	69	
2.	(Croatia) Marin Čilić	6	Shanghai Masters, China	Hard	2R	2–6, 7–6^{(8–6)}, 7–5	48	
2019
3.	(Germany) Alexander Zverev	3	Barcelona Open, Spain	Clay	2R	3–6, 7–5, 7–6^{(7–5)}	81	
4.	(Greece) Stefanos Tsitsipas	6	Rosmalen Championships, Netherlands	Grass	2R	6–4, 3–6, 6–4	60	
2023
5.	(Norway) Casper Ruud	4	Geneva Open, Switzerland	Clay	QF	3–6, 7–6^{(7–2)}, 7–5	54	
6.	(Greece) Stefanos Tsitsipas	5	Halle Open, Germany	Grass	2R	7–6^{(9–7)}, 7–5	28	
7.	(Greece) Stefanos Tsitsipas	5	China Open, China	Hard	1R	6–4, 6–4	23	
2024
8.	(Spain) Carlos Alcaraz	2	Argentina Open, Argentina	Clay	SF	7–6^{(7–2)}, 6–3	21	
9.	(Norway) Casper Ruud	8	Miami Open, United States	Hard	4R	7–6^{(7–3)}, 6–3	23	
10.	(Greece) Stefanos Tsitsipas	8	Italian Open, Italy	Clay	QF	3–6, 7–5, 6–4	24	
2025
11.	(Denmark) Holger Rune	8	Wimbledon, United Kingdom	Grass	1R	4–6, 4–6, 7–5, 6–3, 6–4	143	

- Key: (Rk) first use, opponent rank; (Rd) round; (Rk) 2nd use, player rank; (Ref) reference; (F) final; (SF) semifinal; (QF) quarterfinal; (#R) rounds 4, 3, 2, 1; (RR) round-robin stage; (Q#) qualifying rounds or stages (3), 2, 1.

== Notes ==
Olympic Games
Preceded by Dominique Ohaco; Henrik Von Appen	Flagbearer for Chile; París 2024; With: Antonia Abraham	Succeeded by Incumbent
