= 2025 Chile Open =

- Date: 24 February – 2 March
- Edition: 27th
- Category: ATP Tour 250 series
- Draw: 28S / 16D
- Surface: Clay / outdoor
- Location: Santiago, Chile
- Venue: Estadio San Carlos de Apoquindo

Champions

Singles
- (Serbia) Laslo Djere

Doubles
- (Colombia) Nicolás Barrientos / (India) Rithvik Choudary Bollipalli
← 2024 ·	Chile Open	· 2026 →

The 2025 Chile Open (known as the Movistar Chile Open for sponsorship reasons) was a men's tennis tournament played on outdoor clay courts. It was the 27th edition of the Chile Open, and part of the ATP 250 tournaments of the 2025 ATP Tour. It took place in Santiago, Chile from 24 February through 2 March 2025.

== Champions ==
=== Singles ===
- (Serbia) Laslo Djere def. (Argentina) Sebastián Báez, 6–4, 3–6, 7–5

=== Doubles ===
- (Colombia) Nicolás Barrientos / (India) Rithvik Choudary Bollipalli def. (Argentina) Máximo González / (Argentina) Andrés Molteni, 6–3, 6–2

== Singles main draw entrants ==
=== Seeds ===
Country	Player	Rank^{1}	Seed
ARG	Francisco Cerúndolo	26	1
CHI	Alejandro Tabilo	28	2
ARG	Sebastián Báez	31	3
ESP	Pedro Martínez	37	4
ARG	Tomás Martín Etcheverry	43	5
ARG	Mariano Navone	46	6
CHI	Nicolás Jarry	47	7
ITA	Luciano Darderi	61	8

- Rankings are as of 17 February 2025.

=== Other entrants ===
The following players received wildcards into the singles main draw:

- (Chile) Tomás Barrios Vera
- (Peru) Ignacio Buse
- (Chile) Cristian Garín

The following players received entry from the qualifying draw:

- (Argentina) Juan Manuel Cerúndolo
- (Argentina) Juan Pablo Ficovich
- (Brazil) Gustavo Heide
- (Brazil) Felipe Meligeni Alves

=== Withdrawals ===
- (Italy) Fabio Fognini → replaced by (Argentina) Camilo Ugo Carabelli
- (Spain) Jaume Munar → replaced by (Argentina) Federico Coria
- (Italy) Francesco Passaro → replaced by (Germany) Yannick Hanfmann

== Doubles main draw entrants ==
=== Seeds ===
Country	Player	Country	Player	Rank^{1}	Seed
ARG	Máximo González	ARG	Andrés Molteni	60	1
~~BRA~~	~~Rafael Matos~~	~~BRA~~	~~Marcelo Melo~~	~~71~~	~~2~~
ARG	Guido Andreozzi	FRA	Théo Arribagé	110	3
POR	Francisco Cabral	NED	Jean-Julien Rojer	120	4

- Rankings are as of 17 February 2025.

=== Other entrants ===
The following pairs received wildcards into the doubles main draw:

- (Chile) Tomás Barrios Vera / (Peru) Ignacio Buse
- (Brazil) Fernando Romboli / (Chile) Matías Soto

The following pair received entry as alternates:

- (Argentina) Román Andrés Burruchaga / (Argentina) Thiago Agustín Tirante

=== Withdrawals ===
- (United States) Robert Cash / (United States) JJ Tracy → replaced by (Brazil) Marcelo Demoliner / (Brazil) Marcelo Zormann
- (Spain) Pedro Martínez / (Spain) Jaume Munar → replaced by (Spain) Íñigo Cervantes / (Spain) Pedro Martínez
- (Brazil) Rafael Matos / (Brazil) Marcelo Melo → replaced by (Argentina) Román Andrés Burruchaga / (Argentina) Thiago Agustín Tirante
- (Italy) Francesco Passaro / (Kazakhstan) Alexander Shevchenko → replaced by (Portugal) Jaime Faria / (Kazakhstan) Alexander Shevchenko
