= 2005 Movistar Open – Singles =

Singles
- 2005 Movistar Open

Final
- Champion: (Argentina) Gastón Gaudio
- Runner-up: (Chile) Fernando González
- Score: 6–3, 6–4

Details
- Draw: 32
- Seeds: 8

Events
Singles	Doubles
← 2004 ·	Movistar Open	· 2006 →

Fernando González was the defending champion.

Gastón Gaudio won the title, defeating González 6–3, 6–4 in the final.

== Seeds ==
1. (Argentina) Gastón Gaudio (champion)
2. (Chile) Fernando González (final)
3. (Italy) Filippo Volandri (semifinals)
4. (Spain) David Ferrer (semifinals)
5. (Argentina) Mariano Zabaleta (quarterfinals)
6. (Argentina) José Acasuso (quarterfinals)
7. (Argentina) Agustín Calleri (quarterfinals)
8. (Italy) Potito Starace (first round)

== Draw ==
=== Key ===
- Q = Qualifier
- WC = Wild card
- LL = Lucky loser
- Alt = Alternate
- ITF = ITF entry
- PR = Protected ranking
- SR = Special ranking
- SE = Special exempt
- JE = Junior exempt
- JR = Junior Accelerator Programme entrant
- CO = College Accelerator Programme entrant
- NG = Next Gen Accelerator Program entrant
- w/o = Walkover
- r = Retired
- d = Defaulted

=== Finals ===
Semifinals
WC/1	(Argentina) Gastón Gaudio	6	4	6
4	(Spain) David Ferrer	3	6	2
3	(Italy) Filippo Volandri	4	7	2
2	(Chile) Fernando González	6	5	6

Final
WC/1	(Argentina) Gastón Gaudio	6	6
2	(Chile) Fernando González	3	4

=== Top half ===
First round
WC/1	(Argentina) G Gaudio	7^{8}	6
(Czech Republic) J Vaněk	6^{6}	2
(Spain) A Montañés	7	4	4
(Spain) D Sánchez	5	6	6
WC	(Chile) F Parada	4	6	3
(Brazil) F Saretta	6	4	6
(France) O Patience	1	6	6^{6}
6	(Argentina) J Acasuso	6	3	7^{8}
4	(Spain) D Ferrer	6	6
Q	(Spain) A Portas	4	4
(Argentina) J Mónaco	3	7^{8}	5
(Argentina) M Puerta	6	6^{6}	7
Q	(Italy) F Luzzi	7^{8}	6
(Serbia and Montenegro) J Tipsarević	6^{6}	0
(Spain) Á Calatrava	3	2
7	(Argentina) A Calleri	6	6

Second round
WC/1	(Argentina) G Gaudio	6	6
(Spain) D Sánchez	4	2
(Brazil) F Saretta	2	6^{2}
6	(Argentina) J Acasuso	6	7^{7}
4	(Spain) D Ferrer	6	6
(Argentina) M Puerta	2	0
Q	(Italy) F Luzzi	3	6	3
7	(Argentina) A Calleri	6	3	6

Quarterfinals
WC/1	(Argentina) G Gaudio	6	3	6
6	(Argentina) J Acasuso	2	6	1
4	(Spain) D Ferrer	6	6
7	(Argentina) A Calleri	1	3

Semifinals
WC/1	(Argentina) G Gaudio	6	4	6
4	(Spain) D Ferrer	3	6	2

=== Bottom half ===
First round
8	(Italy) P Starace	1	2
(Spain) R R Hidalgo	6	6
(Spain) F Mantilla	6	3
(Chile) A García	4	2^{r}
(France) P-H Mathieu	6	7^{7}
(Spain) Ó Hernández	2	6^{3}
(Spain) G García López	1	3
3	(Italy) F Volandri	6	6
5	(Argentina) M Zabaleta	6	6
(Ecuador) N Lapentti	1	2
Q	(Chile) P Harboe	3	6	2
(Spain) S Ventura	6	4	6
WC	(Spain) À Corretja	5	2
(Spain) N Almagro	7	6
Q	(Australia) P Luczak	3	7	4
2	(Chile) F González	6	5	6

Second round
(Spain) R R Hidalgo	6	6
(Spain) F Mantilla	4	3
(France) P-H Mathieu	4	4
3	(Italy) F Volandri	6	6
5	(Argentina) M Zabaleta	6	6
(Spain) S Ventura	4	3
(Spain) N Almagro	6^{4}	5
2	(Chile) F González	7^{7}	7

Quarterfinals
(Spain) R R Hidalgo	4	2
3	(Italy) F Volandri	6	6
5	(Argentina) M Zabaleta	6	6^{4}	6^{2}
2	(Chile) F González	4	7^{7}	7^{7}

Semifinals
3	(Italy) F Volandri	4	7	2
2	(Chile) F González	6	5	6
