= 2005 Movistar Open – Doubles =

Doubles
- 2005 Movistar Open

Final
- Champions: (Spain) David Ferrer (Spain) Santiago Ventura
- Runners-up: (Argentina) Gastón Etlis (Argentina) Martín Rodríguez
- Score: 6–3, 6–4

Events
Singles	Doubles
← 2004 ·	Movistar Open	· 2006 →

Juan Ignacio Chela and Gastón Gaudio were the defending champions, but did not participate this year.

David Ferrer and Santiago Ventura won the title, defeating Gastón Etlis and Martín Rodríguez 6–3, 6–4 in the final.

== Seeds ==
1. (Argentina) Gastón Etlis / (Argentina) Martín Rodríguez (final)
2. (Czech Republic) František Čermák / (Czech Republic) Leoš Friedl (first round)
3. (Argentina) Lucas Arnold / (Argentina) Mariano Hood (first round)
4. (Poland) Mariusz Fyrstenberg / (Poland) Marcin Matkowski (quarterfinals)

== Draw ==
Key

- Q = Qualifier
- WC = Wild card
- LL = Lucky loser
- Alt = Alternate
- ITF = ITF entry
- PR = Protected ranking
- SR = Special ranking
- SE = Special exempt
- JE = Junior exempt
- JR = Junior Accelerator Programme entrant
- CO = College Accelerator Programme entrant
- NG = Next Gen Accelerator Program entrant
- w/o = Walkover
- r = Retired
- d = Defaulted

=== Draw ===
First round
1	(Argentina) G Etlis (Argentina) M Rodríguez	7	6
(Argentina) S Prieto (Brazil) F Saretta	5	0
(Argentina) J Acasuso (Spain) Á López Morón	6	6
(Argentina) J Mónaco (Spain) D Sánchez	4	4
3	(Argentina) L Arnold (Argentina) M Hood	2	5
WC	(Chile) H Gamonal (Chile) A García	6	7
WC	(Chile) P Capdeville (Chile) J-I Cerda	6	7^{9}
(Spain) Ó Hernández (Italy) P Starace	2	6^{7}
(Spain) D Ferrer (Spain) S Ventura	6	6
(Australia) S Huss (Sweden) J Landsberg	0	4
(Argentina) A Calleri (Argentina) M García	6	4	3
4	(Poland) M Fyrstenberg (Poland) M Matkowski	4	6	6
(Italy) E Artoni (Argentina) I González King	6	6
(Czech Republic) O Fukárek (Czech Republic) D Škoch	1	4
(Spain) Á Calatrava (Italy) F Volandri	7^{7}	6
2	(Czech Republic) F Čermák (Czech Republic) L Friedl	6^{2}	4

Quarterfinals
1	(Argentina) G Etlis (Argentina) M Rodríguez	6	7
(Argentina) J Acasuso (Spain) Á López Morón	4	5
WC	(Chile) H Gamonal (Chile) A García	6	1	6^{11}
WC	(Chile) P Capdeville (Chile) J-I Cerda	2	6	7^{13}
(Spain) D Ferrer (Spain) S Ventura	5	7^{9}	6
4	(Poland) M Fyrstenberg (Poland) M Matkowski	7	6^{7}	2
(Italy) E Artoni (Argentina) I González King	7	6^{5}	6
(Spain) Á Calatrava (Italy) F Volandri	5	7^{7}	1

Semifinals
1	(Argentina) G Etlis (Argentina) M Rodríguez	7^{7}	6
WC	(Chile) P Capdeville (Chile) J-I Cerda	6^{3}	2
(Spain) D Ferrer (Spain) S Ventura	6	2	7^{7}
(Italy) E Artoni (Argentina) I González King	1	6	6^{0}

Final
1	(Argentina) G Etlis (Argentina) M Rodríguez	3	4
(Spain) D Ferrer (Spain) S Ventura	6	6
