= 2004 BellSouth Open =

- Date: 9–15 February
- Edition: 11th
- Category: International Series
- Draw: 32S / 16D
- Prize money: $308,000
- Surface: Clay / outdoor
- Location: Viña del Mar, Chile

Champions

Singles
- (Chile) Fernando González

Doubles
- (Argentina) Juan Ignacio Chela / (Argentina) Gastón Gaudio
← 2003 ·	Chile Open	· 2005 →

The 2004 BellSouth Open was a men's tennis tournament played on outdoor clay courts in Viña del Mar, Chile and was part of the International Series of the 2004 ATP Tour. It was the eleventh edition of the tournament and ran from February 9 through February 15, 2004. Fifth-seeded Fernando González won the singles title.

== Finals ==
=== Singles ===
(Chile) Fernando González defeated (Brazil) Gustavo Kuerten 7–5, 6–4

- It was González's 1st singles title of the year and the 4th of his career.

=== Doubles ===
(Argentina) Juan Ignacio Chela / (Argentina) Gastón Gaudio defeated (Ecuador) Nicolás Lapentti / (Argentina) Martín Rodríguez 7–6^{(7–2)}, 7–6^{(7–3)}

- It was Chela's 1st title of the year and the 3rd of his career. It was Gaudio's 1st title of the year and the 3rd of his career.
