= 2003 BellSouth Open – Doubles =

Doubles
- 2003 BellSouth Open

Final
- Champions: (Argentina) Agustín Calleri (Argentina) Mariano Hood
- Runners-up: (Czech Republic) František Čermák (Czech Republic) Leoš Friedl
- Score: 6–3, 1–6, 6–4

Events
Singles	Doubles
← 2002 ·	BellSouth Open	· 2004 →

Gastón Etlis and Martín Rodríguez were the defending champions but lost in the first round to Agustín Calleri and Mariano Hood.

Calleri and Hood won in the final 6–3, 1–6, 6–4 against František Čermák and Leoš Friedl.

== Seeds ==
1. (Argentina) Gastón Etlis / (Argentina) Martín Rodríguez (first round)
2. (Czech Republic) František Čermák / (Czech Republic) Leoš Friedl (final)
3. (Sweden) Simon Aspelin / (Australia) Andrew Kratzmann (first round)
4. (Argentina) Lucas Arnold / (Argentina) Luis Lobo (first round)

== Draw ==
=== Key ===
- Q = Qualifier
- WC = Wild card
- LL = Lucky loser
- Alt = Alternate
- SE = Special exempt
- PR = Protected ranking
- ITF = ITF entry
- JE = Junior exempt
- w/o = Walkover
- r = Retired
- d = Defaulted
- SR = Special ranking

First round
1	(Argentina) G Etlis (Argentina) M Rodríguez	6^{5}	7	6^{5}
(Argentina) A Calleri (Argentina) M Hood	7^{7}	5	7^{7}
(Chile) N Massú (Chile) M Ríos	w/o
(Spain) A Martín (Spain) D Sánchez
4	(Argentina) L Arnold (Argentina) L Lobo	1	2
(United States) D Bowen (Australia) A Fisher	6	6
(Argentina) J Acasuso (Argentina) A Schneiter	6	6
WC	(Chile) P Harboe (Argentina) D Moyano	3	2
WC	(Chile) H Gamonal (Chile) A García	0	4
(Italy) E Artoni (Spain) A Portas	6	6
(Argentina) G Gaudio (Argentina) S Prieto	7	3	6
3	(Sweden) S Aspelin (Australia) A Kratzmann	5	6	3
(United States) B Coupe (Australia) S Huss	2	6	1
(Spain) D Ferrer (Spain) F Vicente	6	4	6
(Argentina) M García (Argentina) S Roitman	2	6	6^{3}
2	(Czech Republic) F Čermák (Czech Republic) L Friedl	6	3	7^{7}

Quarterfinals
(Argentina) A Calleri (Argentina) M Hood	w/o
(Chile) N Massú (Chile) M Ríos
(United States) D Bowen (Australia) A Fisher	6	7^{7}
(Argentina) J Acasuso (Argentina) A Schneiter	2	6^{4}
(Italy) E Artoni (Spain) A Portas	w/o
(Argentina) G Gaudio (Argentina) S Prieto
(Spain) D Ferrer (Spain) F Vicente	3	4
2	(Czech Republic) F Čermák (Czech Republic) L Friedl	6	6

Semifinals
(Argentina) A Calleri (Argentina) M Hood	4	7^{7}	6
(United States) D Bowen (Australia) A Fisher	6	6^{1}	3
(Italy) E Artoni (Spain) A Portas	6	4	3
2	(Czech Republic) F Čermák (Czech Republic) L Friedl	4	6	6

Final
(Argentina) A Calleri (Argentina) M Hood	6	1	6
2	(Czech Republic) F Čermák (Czech Republic) L Friedl	3	6	4
