= BellSouth Open =

BellSouth Open may refer to:

- Heineken Open (tennis), a men's tennis tournament sponsored by BellSouth in 1996 and 1997
- Chile Open (tennis), a men's tennis tournament sponsored by BellSouth from 2002 to 2005
