= 2004 BellSouth Open – Doubles =

Doubles
- 2004 BellSouth Open

Final
- Champions: (Argentina) Juan Ignacio Chela (Argentina) Gastón Gaudio
- Runners-up: (Ecuador) Nicolás Lapentti (Argentina) Martín Rodríguez
- Score: 7–6^{(7–2)}, 7–6^{(7–3)}

Events
Singles	Doubles
← 2003 ·	BellSouth Open	· 2005 →

Agustín Calleri and Mariano Hood were the defending champions but only Hood competed that year with Lucas Arnold.

Arnold and Hood lost in the quarterfinals to Mariusz Fyrstenberg and Marcin Matkowski.

Juan Ignacio Chela and Gastón Gaudio won in the final 7–6^{(7–2)}, 7–6^{(7–3)} against Nicolás Lapentti and Martín Rodríguez.

== Seeds ==
1. (Argentina) Lucas Arnold / (Argentina) Mariano Hood (quarterfinals)
2. (Czech Republic) František Čermák / (Czech Republic) Leoš Friedl (semifinals)
3. (Argentina) Martín García / (Argentina) Sebastián Prieto (quarterfinals)
4. (United States) Devin Bowen / (Australia) Ashley Fisher (first round)

== Draw ==
=== Key ===
- Q = Qualifier
- WC = Wild card
- LL = Lucky loser
- Alt = Alternate
- SE = Special exempt
- PR = Protected ranking
- ITF = ITF entry
- JE = Junior exempt
- w/o = Walkover
- r = Retired
- d = Defaulted
- SR = Special ranking

First round
1	(Argentina) L Arnold (Argentina) M Hood	2
(Spain) G Blanco (Spain) A Montañés	0^{r}
(Spain) D Ferrer (Spain) R Ramírez Hidalgo	1	4
(Poland) M Fyrstenberg (Poland) M Matkowski	6	6
3	(Argentina) M García (Argentina) S Prieto	6	6
WC	(Chile) P Capdeville (Chile) P Harboe	3	4
(Ecuador) N Lapentti (Argentina) M Rodríguez	7	7^{7}
(Brazil) G Kuerten (Israel) H Levy	5	6^{3}
WC	(Chile) H Gamonal (Chile) A García	6	3	1
(Argentina) J I Chela (Argentina) G Gaudio	1	6	6
(Spain) Ó Hernández (Peru) L Horna	6	5	7^{7}
4	(United States) D Bowen (Australia) A Fisher	2	7	6^{4}
(Spain) Á López Morón (Spain) A Portas	6	6
(Spain) D Sánchez (Brazil) F Saretta	3	3
(Argentina) M Vassallo Argüello (Italy) F Volandri	2	3
2	(Czech Republic) F Čermák (Czech Republic) L Friedl	6	6

Quarterfinals
1	(Argentina) L Arnold (Argentina) M Hood	7^{7}	2	2
(Poland) M Fyrstenberg (Poland) M Matkowski	6^{5}	6	6
3	(Argentina) M García (Argentina) S Prieto	7^{8}	3	1
(Ecuador) N Lapentti (Argentina) M Rodríguez	6^{6}	6	6
(Argentina) J I Chela (Argentina) G Gaudio	w/o
(Spain) Ó Hernández (Peru) L Horna
(Spain) Á López Morón (Spain) A Portas	3	2
2	(Czech Republic) F Čermák (Czech Republic) L Friedl	6	6

Semifinals
(Poland) M Fyrstenberg (Poland) M Matkowski	4	2
(Ecuador) N Lapentti (Argentina) M Rodríguez	6	6
(Argentina) J I Chela (Argentina) G Gaudio	6	1	6
2	(Czech Republic) F Čermák (Czech Republic) L Friedl	1	6	3

Final
(Ecuador) N Lapentti (Argentina) M Rodríguez	6^{2}	6^{3}
(Argentina) J I Chela (Argentina) G Gaudio	7^{7}	7^{7}
