= 2021 Chile Open =

- Date: 8–14 March
- Edition: 23rd
- Category: ATP Tour 250 series
- Draw: 28S / 16D
- Prize money: $393,935
- Surface: Clay / outdoor
- Location: Santiago, Chile

Champions

Singles
- (Chile) Cristian Garín

Doubles
- (Italy) Simone Bolelli / (Argentina) Máximo González
- Chile Open

The 2021 Chile Open (also known as the Chile Dove Men+Care Open for sponsorship reasons) was a men's tennis tournament played on outdoor clay courts. It was the 23rd edition of the Chile Open, and part of the ATP 250 of the 2021 ATP Tour. It took place in Santiago, Chile from 8 through 14 March 2021. First-seeded Cristian Garín won the singles title.

== Finals ==
=== Singles ===
- (Chile) Cristian Garín defeated (Argentina) Facundo Bagnis, 6–4, 6–7^{(3–7)}, 7–5

=== Doubles ===
- (Italy) Simone Bolelli / (Argentina) Máximo González defeated (Argentina) Federico Delbonis / (Spain) Jaume Munar, 7–6^{(7–4)}, 6–4

== Singles main draw entrants ==
=== Seeds ===
Country	Player	Rank^{1}	Seed
CHI	Cristian Garín	22	1
FRA	Benoît Paire	29	2
ESP	Pablo Andújar	57	3
SRB	Laslo Đere	60	4
USA	Frances Tiafoe	62	5
ITA	Salvatore Caruso	79	6
ARG	Federico Coria	85	7
ARG	Federico Delbonis	86	8

- Rankings are as of March 1, 2021.

=== Other entrants ===
The following players received wildcards into the singles main draw:

- (Argentina) Juan Manuel Cerúndolo
- (Chile) Nicolás Jarry
- (Chile) Gonzalo Lama

The following player received special exemption into the singles main draw:

- (Argentina) Francisco Cerúndolo

The following players received entry from the qualifying draw:

- (Argentina) Sebastián Báez
- (Denmark) Holger Rune
- (Chile) Alejandro Tabilo
- (Peru) Juan Pablo Varillas

=== Withdrawals ===
- (Italy) Fabio Fognini → replaced by (Spain) Jaume Munar
- (Serbia) Miomir Kecmanović → replaced by (Slovakia) Andrej Martin
- (Germany) Dominik Koepfer → replaced by (Colombia) Daniel Elahi Galán
- (Argentina) Juan Ignacio Londero → replaced by (Argentina) Facundo Bagnis
- (Spain) Pedro Martínez → replaced by (Germany) Daniel Altmaier
- (Brazil) Thiago Monteiro → replaced by (Slovakia) Jozef Kovalík
- (Argentina) Guido Pella → replaced by (Portugal) Pedro Sousa

== Doubles main draw entrants ==
=== Seeds ===
Country	Player	Country	Player	Rank^{1}	Seed
RSA	Raven Klaasen	JPN	Ben McLachlan	69	1
USA	Austin Krajicek	CRO	Franko Škugor	74	2
BRA	Marcelo Demoliner	MEX	Santiago González	93	3
ITA	Simone Bolelli	ARG	Máximo González	117	4

- ^{1} Rankings are as of March 1, 2021

=== Other entrants ===
The following pairs received wildcards into the doubles main draw:

- (Chile) Marcelo Tomás Barrios Vera / (Chile) Alejandro Tabilo
- (Chile) Nicolás Jarry / (Argentina) Leonardo Mayer

=== Withdrawals ===
Before the tournament

- (Argentina) Federico Delbonis / (Argentina) Juan Ignacio Londero → replaced by (Argentina) Federico Delbonis / (Spain) Jaume Munar
