= 2022 Chile Open – Doubles =

Doubles
- 2022 Chile Open

Final
- Champions: (Brazil) Rafael Matos (Brazil) Felipe Meligeni Alves
- Runners-up: (Sweden) André Göransson (United States) Nathaniel Lammons
- Score: 7–6^{(10–8)}, 7–6^{(7–3)}

Events
Singles	Doubles
← 2021 ·	Chile Open	· 2023 →

Simone Bolelli and Máximo González were the defending champions but Bolelli chose not to participate. González was scheduled to partner Nicolás Jarry, but Jarry withdrew with a right elbow injury before their first round match.

Rafael Matos and Felipe Meligeni Alves won the title, defeating André Göransson and Nathaniel Lammons in the final, 7–6^{(10–8)}, 7–6^{(7–3)}.

== Seeds ==
1. (Brazil) Rafael Matos / (Brazil) Felipe Meligeni Alves (champions)
2. (Spain) Pedro Martínez / (Italy) Andrea Vavassori (first round)
3. (Sweden) André Göransson / (United States) Nathaniel Lammons (final)
4. (United States) Nicholas Monroe / (United States) Jackson Withrow (first round)

== Draw ==
=== Key ===
- Q = Qualifier
- WC = Wild card
- LL = Lucky loser
- Alt = Alternate
- SE = Special exempt
- PR = Protected ranking
- ITF = ITF entry
- JE = Junior exempt
- w/o = Walkover
- r = Retired
- d = Defaulted
- SR = Special ranking

=== Draw ===
First round
1	(Brazil) R Matos (Brazil) F Meligeni Alves	6^{5}	6	[10]
Alt	(Peru) S Galdós (Peru) JP Varillas	7^{7}	4	[7]
(Serbia) M Kecmanović (Venezuela) LD Martínez	3	4
(Brazil) O Luz (Brazil) T Monteiro	6	6
4	(United States) N Monroe (United States) J Withrow	3	6	[7]
(Argentina) F Delbonis (Argentina) G Durán	6	3	[10]
WC	(Chile) G Lama (Chile) A Tabilo	4	6	[7]
Alt	(Czech Republic) Z Kolář (Serbia) N Milojević	6	1	[10]
(France) S Doumbia (France) F Reboul	6	7
WC	(Argentina) TM Etcheverry (Argentina) JI Londero	3	5
(Spain) A Ramos Viñolas (Spain) B Zapata Miralles	2	5
3	(Sweden) A Göransson (United States) N Lammons	6	7
Alt	(Germany) Y Hanfmann (Brazil) F Romboli	2	4
(Serbia) I Sabanov (Serbia) M Sabanov	6	6
(Argentina) F Bagnis (Spain) J Munar	4	7^{7}	[10]
2	(Spain) P Martínez (Italy) A Vavassori	6	6^{3}	[5]

Quarterfinals
1	(Brazil) R Matos (Brazil) F Meligeni Alves	7^{7}	7
(Brazil) O Luz (Brazil) T Monteiro	6^{2}	5
(Argentina) F Delbonis (Argentina) G Durán	6	7^{7}
Alt	(Czech Republic) Z Kolář (Serbia) N Milojević	3	6^{4}
(France) S Doumbia (France) F Reboul	4	7^{7}	[9]
3	(Sweden) A Göransson (United States) N Lammons	6	6^{4}	[11]
(Serbia) I Sabanov (Serbia) M Sabanov	3	1
(Argentina) F Bagnis (Spain) J Munar	6	6

Semifinals
1	(Brazil) R Matos (Brazil) F Meligeni Alves	w/o
(Argentina) F Delbonis (Argentina) G Durán
3	(Sweden) A Göransson (United States) N Lammons	w/o
(Argentina) F Bagnis (Spain) J Munar

Final
1	(Brazil) R Matos (Brazil) F Meligeni Alves	7^{10}	7^{7}
3	(Sweden) A Göransson (United States) N Lammons	6^{8}	6^{3}
