= 2022 Chile Open =

- Date: 21–27 February
- Edition: 24th
- Category: ATP Tour 250 series
- Draw: 28S / 16D
- Prize money: $546,340
- Surface: Clay / outdoor
- Location: Santiago, Chile

Champions

Singles
- (Spain) Pedro Martínez

Doubles
- (Brazil) Rafael Matos / (Brazil) Felipe Meligeni Alves
- Chile Open

The 2022 Chile Open (also known as the Chile Dove Men+Care Open for sponsorship reasons) was a men's tennis tournament played on outdoor clay courts. It was the 24th edition of the Chile Open, and part of the ATP 250 of the 2022 ATP Tour. It took place in Santiago, Chile from 21 through 27 February 2022. Fourth-seeded Pedro Martínez won the singles title.

== Finals ==
=== Singles ===
- (Spain) Pedro Martínez defeated (Argentina) Sebastián Báez, 4–6, 6–4, 6–4

=== Doubles ===
- (Brazil) Rafael Matos / (Brazil) Felipe Meligeni Alves defeated (Sweden) André Göransson / (United States) Nathaniel Lammons, 7–6^{(10–8)}, 7–6^{(7–3)}.

== Point and prize money ==
=== Point distribution ===
| Event | W | F | SF | QF | Round of 16 | Round of 32 | Q | Q2 | Q1 |
| Singles | 250 | 150 | 90 | 45 | 20 | 0 | 12 | 6 | 0 |
| Doubles | 250 | 150 | 90 | 45 | 0 | —N/a | —N/a | —N/a | —N/a |

=== Prize money ===
| Event | W | F | SF | QF | Round of 16 | Round of 32 | Q2 | Q1 |
| Singles | $51,045 | $35,735 | $23,660 | $15,780 | $10,210 | $5,570 | $2,785 | $1,390 |
| Doubles* | $18,100 | $13,000 | $8,340 | $5,570 | $3,250 | —N/a | —N/a | —N/a |

_{*per team}

== Singles main draw entrants ==
=== Seeds ===
| Country | Player | Rank^{1} | Seed |
|---|---|---|---|
| CHI | Cristian Garín | 19 | 1 |
| ESP | Albert Ramos Viñolas | 33 | 2 |
| ARG | Federico Delbonis | 37 | 3 |
| ESP | Pedro Martínez | 62 | 4 |
| ARG | Federico Coria | 63 | 5 |
| SRB | Miomir Kecmanović | 70 | 6 |
| ARG | Sebastián Báez | 72 | 7 |
| ARG | Facundo Bagnis | 77 | 8 |

- Rankings are as of February 14, 2022.

=== Other entrants ===
The following players received wildcards into the singles main draw:

- (Chile) Nicolás Jarry
- (Brazil) Thiago Seyboth Wild
- (Chile) Alejandro Tabilo

The following players received entry using a protected ranking into the singles main draw:

- (Germany) Yannick Hanfmann

The following players received entry from the qualifying draw:

- (Chile) Gonzalo Lama
- (Argentina) Juan Ignacio Londero
- (Argentina) Renzo Olivo
- (Brazil) Matheus Pucinelli de Almeida

The following player received entry as a lucky loser:

- (Argentina) Nicolás Kicker

=== Withdrawals ===
- (Spain) Roberto Carballés Baena → replaced by (Argentina) Nicolás Kicker
- (Norway) Casper Ruud → replaced by (Spain) Bernabé Zapata Miralles
- (Austria) Dominic Thiem → replaced by (Colombia) Daniel Elahi Galán

== Doubles main draw entrants ==
=== Seeds ===
| Country | Player | Country | Player | Rank^{1} | Seed |
|---|---|---|---|---|---|
| BRA | Rafael Matos | BRA | Felipe Meligeni Alves | 143 | 1 |
| ESP | Pedro Martínez | ITA | Andrea Vavassori | 145 | 2 |
| SWE | André Göransson | USA | Nathaniel Lammons | 157 | 3 |
| USA | Nicholas Monroe | USA | Jackson Withrow | 188 | 4 |

- Rankings are as of February 14, 2022.

=== Other entrants ===
The following pairs received wildcards into the doubles main draw:

- (Argentina) Tomás Martín Etcheverry / (Argentina) Juan Ignacio Londero
- (Chile) Gonzalo Lama / (Chile) Alejandro Tabilo

The following pairs received entry as alternates:

- (Peru) Sergio Galdós / (Peru) Juan Pablo Varillas
- (Germany) Yannick Hanfmann / (Brazil) Fernando Romboli
- (Czech Republic) Zdeněk Kolář / (Serbia) Nikola Milojević

=== Withdrawals ===
Before the tournament

- (Spain) Roberto Carballés Baena / (Argentina) Federico Coria → replaced by (Peru) Sergio Galdos / (Peru) Juan Pablo Varillas
- (Italy) Marco Cecchinato / (Spain) Carlos Taberner → replaced by (Czech Republic) Zdeněk Kolář / (Serbia) Nikola Milojević
- (Brazil) Marcelo Demoliner / (Venezuela) Luis David Martínez → replaced by (Serbia) Miomir Kecmanović / (Venezuela) Luis David Martínez
- (Argentina) Máximo González / (Chile) Nicolás Jarry → replaced by (Germany) Yannick Hanfmann / (Brazil) Fernando Romboli

During the tournament

- (Argentina) Facundo Bagnis / (Spain) Jaume Munar
- (Argentina) Federico Delbonis / (Argentina) Guillermo Durán
