= 2024 Chile Open – Doubles =

Doubles
- 2024 Chile Open

Final
- Champions: (Chile) Tomás Barrios Vera (Chile) Alejandro Tabilo
- Runners-up: (Brazil) Orlando Luz (Chile) Matías Soto
- Score: 6–2, 6–4

Events
Singles	Doubles
← 2023 ·	Chile Open	· 2025 →

Tomás Barrios Vera and Alejandro Tabilo defeated Orlando Luz and Matías Soto in the final, 6–2, 6–4 to win the doubles tennis title at the 2024 Chile Open. It was both players' first ATP doubles title.

Andrea Pellegrino and Andrea Vavassori were the defending champions, but lost in the quarterfinals to Barrios Vera and Tabilo.

== Seeds ==
1. (Brazil) Marcelo Melo / (Netherlands) Matwé Middelkoop (semifinals)
2. (Italy) Andrea Pellegrino / (Italy) Andrea Vavassori (quarterfinals)
3. (Colombia) Nicolás Barrientos / (Brazil) Rafael Matos (semifinals)
4. (United States) Evan King / (United States) Reese Stalder (quarterfinals)

== Draw ==
=== Key ===
- Q = Qualifier
- WC = Wild card
- LL = Lucky loser
- Alt = Alternate
- ITF = ITF entry
- PR = Protected ranking
- SR = Special ranking
- SE = Special exempt
- JE = Junior exempt
- JR = Junior Accelerator Programme entrant
- CO = College Accelerator Programme entrant
- NG = Next Gen Accelerator Program entrant
- w/o = Walkover
- r = Retired
- d = Defaulted

=== Draw ===
First round
1	(Brazil) M Melo (Netherlands) M Middelkoop	6	6
(Argentina) P Cachín (Spain) J Munar	3	1
(Brazil) M Demoliner (Argentina) G Durán	4	6^{3}
(Bolivia) B Arias (Bolivia) F Zeballos	6	7^{7}
4	(United States) E King (United States) R Stalder	6	3	[10]
(India) A Chandrasekar (India) VS Prashanth	4	6	[7]
WC	(Brazil) O Luz (Chile) M Soto	6	6
WC	(Peru) I Buse (Peru) A Huertas del Pino	3	4
(Romania) VV Cornea (Austria) P Oswald	3	2
(Ecuador) D Hidalgo (Colombia) C Rodríguez	6	6
Alt	(Brazil) F Romboli (Brazil) M Zormann	4	6^{6}
3	(Colombia) N Barrientos (Brazil) R Matos	6	7^{8}
(France) T Arribagé (France) L Sanchez	7^{7}	4	[5]
(Chile) T Barrios Vera (Chile) A Tabilo	6^{4}	6	[10]
(Spain) R Carballes Baena (Spain) B Zapata Miralles	5	4
2	(Italy) A Pellegrino (Italy) A Vavassori	7	6

Quarterfinals
1	(Brazil) M Melo (Netherlands) M Middelkoop	6	6
(Bolivia) B Arias (Bolivia) F Zeballos	3	4
4	(United States) E King (United States) R Stalder	5	4
WC	(Brazil) O Luz (Chile) M Soto	7	6
(Ecuador) D Hidalgo (Colombia) C Rodríguez	6^{4}	6	[9]
3	(Colombia) N Barrientos (Brazil) R Matos	7^{7}	4	[11]
(Chile) T Barrios Vera (Chile) A Tabilo	7	4	[10]
2	(Italy) A Pellegrino (Italy) A Vavassori	5	6	[7]

Semifinals
1	(Brazil) M Melo (Netherlands) M Middelkoop	6^{2}	2
WC	(Brazil) O Luz (Chile) M Soto	7^{7}	6
3	(Colombia) N Barrientos (Brazil) R Matos	6	4	[6]
(Chile) T Barrios Vera (Chile) A Tabilo	2	6	[10]

Final
WC	(Brazil) O Luz (Chile) M Soto	2	4
(Chile) T Barrios Vera (Chile) A Tabilo	6	6
