= 2004 BellSouth Open – Singles =

Singles
- 2004 BellSouth Open

Final
- Champion: (Chile) Fernando González
- Runner-up: (Brazil) Gustavo Kuerten
- Score: 7–5, 6–4

Details
- Draw: 32
- Seeds: 8

Events
Singles	Doubles
← 2003 ·	BellSouth Open	· 2005 →

David Sánchez was the defending champion but lost in the semifinals to Gustavo Kuerten.

Fernando González won in the final 7–5, 6–4 against Kuerten.

== Seeds ==
1. (Chile) Nicolás Massú (quarterfinals)
2. (Brazil) Gustavo Kuerten (final)
3. (Argentina) Mariano Zabaleta (quarterfinals)
4. (Argentina) Gastón Gaudio (quarterfinals)
5. (Chile) Fernando González (champion)
6. (Argentina) Juan Ignacio Chela (first round)
7. (Italy) Filippo Volandri (quarterfinals)
8. (Brazil) Flávio Saretta (semifinals)

== Draw ==
=== Key ===
- Q = Qualifier
- WC = Wild card
- LL = Lucky loser
- Alt = Alternate
- SE = Special exempt
- PR = Protected ranking
- ITF = ITF entry
- JE = Junior exempt
- w/o = Walkover
- r = Retired
- d = Defaulted
- SR = Special ranking

=== Finals ===
Semifinals
5	(Chile) Fernando González	6	6
8	(Brazil) Flávio Saretta	2	3
(Spain) David Sánchez	6^{6}	4
2	(Brazil) Gustavo Kuerten	7^{8}	6

Final
5	(Chile) Fernando González	7	6
2	(Brazil) Gustavo Kuerten	5	4

=== Top half ===
First round
1	(Chile) N Massú	6	6
(Spain) F Verdasco	1	2
Q	(Czech Republic) F Čermák	3	3
(Israel) H Levy	6	6
WC	(Chile) A García	6	6
Q	(Chile) P Capdeville	4	4
(Spain) A Montañés	1	5
5	(Chile) F González	6	7
3	(Argentina) M Zabaleta	6	6
(Spain) D Ferrer	4	0
(Spain) R Ramírez Hidalgo	6	3	6
(Germany) T Behrend	1	6	3
(Peru) L Horna	6	7
WC	(Chile) G Hormazábal	4	5
WC	(Chile) H Gamonal	2	1
8	(Brazil) F Saretta	6	6

Second round
1	(Chile) N Massú	6	6
(Israel) H Levy	2	4
WC	(Chile) A García	5	1
5	(Chile) F González	7	6
3	(Argentina) M Zabaleta	6	4	6
(Spain) R Ramírez Hidalgo	3	6	1
(Peru) L Horna	1	0^{r}
8	(Brazil) F Saretta	6	1

Quarterfinals
1	(Chile) N Massú	6^{4}	3
5	(Chile) F González	7^{7}	6
3	(Argentina) M Zabaleta	3	4
8	(Brazil) F Saretta	6	6

Semifinals
5	(Chile) F González	6	6
8	(Brazil) F Saretta	2	3

=== Bottom half ===
First round
6	(Argentina) J I Chela	4	2
(Spain) D Sánchez	6	6
(Peru) I Miranda	6	6
(Argentina) M Vassallo Argüello	4	3
(Ecuador) N Lapentti	6^{5}	4
(Argentina) J Acasuso	7^{7}	6
(France) R Gasquet	6	3	2
4	(Argentina) G Gaudio	3	6	6
7	(Italy) F Volandri	6	6
(Spain) A Portas	0	4
(Spain) G Blanco	6	6
Q	(Costa Rica) J A Marín	4	3
Q	(Argentina) F Squillari	6	6
(Spain) Ó Hernández	4	1
(Monaco) J-R Lisnard	3	3
2	(Brazil) G Kuerten	6	6

Second round
(Spain) D Sánchez	6	6
(Peru) I Miranda	1	4
(Argentina) J Acasuso	3	3
4	(Argentina) G Gaudio	6	6
7	(Italy) F Volandri	6	6
(Spain) G Blanco	2	0
Q	(Argentina) F Squillari	1	6^{2}
2	(Brazil) G Kuerten	6	7^{7}

Quarterfinals
(Spain) D Sánchez	7	3	6
4	(Argentina) G Gaudio	5	6	2
7	(Italy) F Volandri	1	6	6^{4}
2	(Brazil) G Kuerten	6	2	7^{7}

Semifinals
(Spain) D Sánchez	6^{6}	4
2	(Brazil) G Kuerten	7^{8}	6
