= 2024 Chile Open =

- Date: 26 February – 3 March
- Edition: 26th
- Category: ATP Tour 250 series
- Draw: 28S / 16D
- Prize money: $661,585
- Surface: Clay / outdoor
- Location: Santiago, Chile
- Venue: Estadio San Carlos de Apoquindo

Champions

Singles
- (Argentina) Sebastián Báez

Doubles
- (Chile) Tomás Barrios Vera / (Chile) Alejandro Tabilo
- Chile Open

The 2024 Chile Open (known as the Movistar Chile Open for sponsorship reasons) was a men's tennis tournament played on outdoor clay courts. It was the 26th edition of the Chile Open, and part of the ATP 250 tournaments of the 2024 ATP Tour. It took place in Santiago, Chile from 26 February through 3 March 2024.

== Champions ==
=== Singles ===
- (Argentina) Sebastián Báez def. (Chile) Alejandro Tabilo, 3–6, 6–0, 6–4

=== Doubles ===
- (Chile) Tomás Barrios Vera / (Chile) Alejandro Tabilo def. (Brazil) Orlando Luz / (Chile) Matías Soto 6–2, 6–4

== Singles main draw entrants ==
=== Seeds ===
Country	Player	Rank^{1}	Seed
CHI	Nicolás Jarry	19	1
ARG	Sebastián Báez	30	2
FRA	Arthur Fils	36	3
CHI	Alejandro Tabilo	52	4
GER	Yannick Hanfmann	56	5
ARG	Facundo Díaz Acosta	59	6
ESP	Roberto Carballés Baena	66	7
ESP	Jaume Munar	73	8

- Rankings are as of 19 February 2024.

=== Other entrants ===
The following players received wildcards into the singles main draw:

- (Italy) Luciano Darderi
- (Brazil) João Fonseca
- (Italy) Francesco Passaro

The following player received entry as a special exempt:

- ~~(Argentina) Mariano Navone~~

The following players received entry from the qualifying draw:

- (Argentina) Román Andrés Burruchaga
- (Argentina) Juan Manuel Cerúndolo
- (Slovakia) Alex Molčan
- (France) Corentin Moutet

The following players received entry as lucky losers:

- (Argentina) Facundo Bagnis
- (Argentina) Francisco Comesaña

=== Withdrawals ===
- (Argentina) Tomás Martín Etcheverry → replaced by (Chile) Tomás Barrios Vera
- (Colombia) Daniel Elahi Galán → replaced by (Argentina) Facundo Bagnis
- (Argentina) Mariano Navone → replaced by (Argentina) Francisco Comesaña

== Doubles main draw entrants ==
=== Seeds ===
Country	Player	Country	Player	Rank^{1}	Seed
BRA	Marcelo Melo	NED	Matwé Middelkoop	95	1
ITA	Andrea Pellegrino	ITA	Andrea Vavassori	107	2
COL	Nicolás Barrientos	BRA	Rafael Matos	121	3
USA	Evan King	USA	Reese Stalder	141	4

- Rankings are as of 19 February 2024.

=== Other entrants ===
The following pairs received wildcards into the doubles main draw:

- (Peru) Ignacio Buse / (Peru) Arklon Huertas del Pino
- (Brazil) Orlando Luz / (Chile) Matías Soto

The following pair received entry as alternates:

- (Brazil) Fernando Romboli / (Brazil) Marcelo Zormann

=== Withdrawals ===
- (Italy) Luciano Darderi / (Argentina) Tomás Martín Etcheverry → replaced by (Italy) Luciano Darderi / (Spain) Pedro Martínez → replaced by (Brazil) Fernando Romboli / (Brazil) Marcelo Zormann
