= 1977 Chilean International =

- Date: 14–20 November
- Edition: 2nd
- Category: Grand Prix (1 Star)
- Draw: 32S / 16D
- Prize money: $50,000
- Surface: Clay / outdoor
- Location: Santiago, Chile

Champions

Singles
- (India) Guillermo Vilas

Doubles
- (Chile) Jaime Fillol / (Chile) Patricio Cornejo
- Chilean Open

The 1977 Chilean International was a men's tennis tournament played on outdoor clay courts in Santiago, Chile. It was the second edition of the tournament and was held from 14 November through 20 November 1977. The tournament was part of the 1 Star tier of the Grand Prix tennis circuit. First-seeded Guillermo Vilas won the singles title.

== Finals ==
=== Singles ===
(Argentina) Guillermo Vilas defeated (Chile) Jaime Fillol 6–0, 2–6, 6–4

- It was Vilas' 14th singles title of the year and the 33rd of his career.

=== Doubles ===
(Chile) Jaime Fillol / (Chile) Patricio Cornejo defeated (United States) Henry Bunis / (Australia) Paul McNamee 5–7, 6–1, 6–1
