= 1981 Santiago International Championships =

- Date: 21–27 November
- Edition: 6th
- Category: Grand Prix
- Draw: 32S / 16D
- Prize money: $50,000
- Surface: Clay / outdoor
- Location: Santiago, Chile

Champions

Singles
- (Chile) Hans Gildemeister

Doubles
- (Chile) Hans Gildemeister / (Ecuador) Andrés Gómez
- Chilean Open

The 1981 Santiago International Championships was a men's tennis tournament played on outdoor clay courts in Santiago, Chile that was part of the Grand Prix tennis circuit. It was the sixth and last edition of the tournament and was held from 21 November through 27 November 1981. Second-seeded Hans Gildemeister won the singles title, his second at the event after 1979.

== Finals ==
=== Singles ===
(Chile) Hans Gildemeister defeated (Ecuador) Andrés Gómez 6–4, 7–5

- It was Gildemeister's 1st singles title of the year and the 3rd of his career.

=== Doubles ===
(Chile) Hans Gildemeister / (Ecuador) Andrés Gómez defeated (Argentina) Ricardo Cano / (Chile) Belus Prajoux 6–2, 7–6
