= 2003 BellSouth Open – Singles =

Singles
- 2003 BellSouth Open

Final
- Champion: (Spain) David Sánchez
- Runner-up: (Chile) Marcelo Ríos
- Score: 1–6, 6–3, 6–3

Details
- Draw: 32
- Seeds: 8

Events
Singles	Doubles
← 2002 ·	BellSouth Open	· 2004 →

Fernando González was the defending champion but did not compete that year.

David Sánchez won in the final 1–6, 6–3, 6–3 against Marcelo Ríos.

== Seeds ==
1. (Argentina) Gastón Gaudio (semifinals)
2. (Ecuador) ~~Nicolás Lapentti~~ (withdrew because of a back injury)
3. (Chile) Marcelo Ríos (final)
4. (Argentina) José Acasuso (second round)
5. (Argentina) Agustín Calleri (quarterfinals)
6. (Spain) Fernando Vicente (second round)
7. (Spain) Félix Mantilla (quarterfinals)
8. (Spain) David Ferrer (second round)

== Draw ==
=== Key ===
- Q = Qualifier
- WC = Wild card
- LL = Lucky loser
- Alt = Alternate
- SE = Special exempt
- PR = Protected ranking
- ITF = ITF entry
- JE = Junior exempt
- w/o = Walkover
- r = Retired
- d = Defaulted
- SR = Special ranking

=== Finals ===
Semifinals
1	(Argentina) Gastón Gaudio	3	2
3	(Chile) Marcelo Ríos	6	6
(Spain) David Sánchez	7^{7}	3	6
(Spain) Albert Montañés	6^{4}	6	1

Final
3	(Chile) Marcelo Ríos	6	3	3
(Spain) David Sánchez	1	6	6

=== Top half ===
First round
1	(Argentina) G Gaudio	6	2	6
(Chile) N Massú	0	6	1
WC	(Chile) H Gamonal	7	5	6
(Spain) J Díaz	5	7	3
Q	(Brazil) M Daniel	7	6
(Brazil) F Meligeni	5	4
(Spain) A Martín	5	4
7	(Spain) F Mantilla	7	6
3	(Chile) M Ríos	6	6
WC	(Chile) A García	3	2
(Spain) A Portas	7	1	7
Q	(Czech Republic) F Čermák	5	6	5
(Argentina) M Puerta	6	6
(Brazil) F Saretta	3	0
(United States) C Mamiit	6	3	4
5	(Argentina) A Calleri	0	6	6

Second round
1	(Argentina) G Gaudio	6	6
WC	(Chile) H Gamonal	3	4
Q	(Brazil) M Daniel	2	3
7	(Spain) F Mantilla	6	6
3	(Chile) M Ríos	6	7^{7}
(Spain) A Portas	4	6^{3}
(Argentina) M Puerta	6	2	2
5	(Argentina) A Calleri	3	6	6

Quarterfinals
1	(Argentina) G Gaudio	6	3	6
7	(Spain) F Mantilla	2	6	3
3	(Chile) M Ríos	6	7^{7}
5	(Argentina) A Calleri	4	6^{2}

Semifinals
1	(Argentina) G Gaudio	3	2
3	(Chile) M Ríos	6	6

=== Bottom half ===
First round
8	(Spain) D Ferrer	6	6
(United States) A Kim	2	3
(Italy) A Gaudenzi	4	6	6
(Austria) M Hipfl	6	3	0
Q	(Argentina) S Prieto	4	5
(Spain) D Sánchez	6	7
(Peru) L Horna	4	3
4	(Argentina) J Acasuso	6	6
6	(Spain) F Vicente	3	6	6
Q	(Spain) Ó Serrano	6	2	4
WC	(Chile) J Peralta	5	4
(Spain) A Montañés	7	6
(Hungary) A Sávolt	6^{8}	3
(Czech Republic) J Vaněk	7^{10}	6
(Argentina) F Squillari	7	4	6
LL	(Spain) R Ramírez Hidalgo	5	6	2

Second round
8	(Spain) D Ferrer	7	4	0
(Italy) A Gaudenzi	5	6	6
(Spain) D Sánchez	4	6	6
4	(Argentina) J Acasuso	6	0	1
6	(Spain) F Vicente	7^{7}	1	2
(Spain) A Montañés	6^{3}	6	6
(Czech Republic) J Vaněk	7^{7}	7^{7}
(Argentina) F Squillari	6^{2}	6^{5}

Quarterfinals
(Italy) A Gaudenzi	7^{7}	1	3
(Spain) D Sánchez	6^{2}	6	6
(Spain) A Montañés	6	6
(Czech Republic) J Vaněk	0	4

Semifinals
(Spain) D Sánchez	7^{7}	3	6
(Spain) A Montañés	6^{4}	6	1
