= 2026 Chile Open – Singles =

Singles
- 2026 Chile Open

Final
- Champion: (Italy) Luciano Darderi
- Runner-up: (Germany) Yannick Hanfmann
- Score: 7–6^{(8–6)}, 7–5

Details
- Draw: 28 (4 Q / 3 WC )
- Seeds: 8

Events
Singles	Doubles
- Chile Open

Luciano Darderi defeated Yannick Hanfmann in the final, 7–6^{(8–6)}, 7–5 to win the singles tennis title at the 2026 Chile Open. It was his fifth ATP Tour title. Hanfmann was contesting his first ATP Tour final since 2020.

Laslo Djere was the reigning champion, but withdrew before the start of the tournament.

Emilio Nava was the first American to reach an ATP Tour singles quarterfinal on South American clay since Rajeev Ram at the 2017 Quito Open. Hanfmann was the first German man to reach an ATP Tour semifinal on South American clay since Tommy Haas at the 2014 Brasil Open.

== Seeds ==
The top four seeds received a bye into the second round.

1. (Argentina) Francisco Cerúndolo (semifinals)
2. (Italy) Luciano Darderi (champion)
3. (Argentina) Sebastián Báez (semifinals)
4. (Argentina) Camilo Ugo Carabelli (second round)
5. (Argentina) Tomás Martín Etcheverry (withdrew)
6. (Italy) Matteo Berrettini (first round)
7. (Argentina) Francisco Comesaña (second round)
8. (Chile) Alejandro Tabilo (quarterfinals)

== Draw ==
Key

- Q = Qualifier
- WC = Wild card
- LL = Lucky loser
- Alt = Alternate
- ITF = ITF entry
- PR = Protected ranking
- SR = Special ranking
- SE = Special exempt
- JE = Junior exempt
- JR = Junior Accelerator Programme entrant
- CO = College Accelerator Programme entrant
- NG = Next Gen Accelerator Program entrant
- w/o = Walkover
- r = Retired
- d = Defaulted

=== Finals ===
Semifinals
1	(Argentina) Francisco Cerúndolo	3	4
(Germany) Yannick Hanfmann	6	6
3	(Argentina) Sebastián Báez	4	3
2	(Italy) Luciano Darderi	6	6

Final
(Germany) Yannick Hanfmann	6^{6}	5
2	(Italy) Luciano Darderi	7^{8}	7

=== Top half ===
First round
(Denmark) E Møller	7^{7}	0	6
(Argentina) RA Burruchaga	6^{4}	6	4
WC	(Italy) F Passaro	3	3^{r}
Q	(Paraguay) AD Vallejo	6	3
(United States) E Nava	6	6
6	(Italy) M Berrettini	3	4
(Serbia) D Lajović	0	3
(Germany) Y Hanfmann	6	6
WC	(Chile) N Jarry	3	7	2
Q	(Croatia) D Prižmić	6	5	6
WC	(Chile) M Soto	2	3
LL	(Lithuania) V Gaubas	6	6

Second round
1	(Argentina) F Cerúndolo	6	6
(Denmark) E Møller	2	2
Q	(Paraguay) AD Vallejo	5	3
(United States) E Nava	7	6
4	(Argentina) C Ugo Carabelli	4	3
(Germany) Y Hanfmann	6	6
Q	(Croatia) D Prižmić	7	5	3
LL	(Lithuania) V Gaubas	5	7	6

Quarterfinals
1	(Argentina) F Cerúndolo	6	6
(United States) E Nava	1	1
(Germany) Y Hanfmann	3	6	6
LL	(Lithuania) V Gaubas	6	2	2

Semifinals
1	(Argentina) F Cerúndolo	3	4
(Germany) Y Hanfmann	6	6

=== Bottom half ===
First round
8	(Chile) A Tabilo	7	6
(Chile) T Barrios Vera	5	3
(Argentina) TA Tirante	2	7^{7}	7^{7}
(Peru) I Buse	6	6^{0}	6^{2}
(Argentina) JM Cerúndolo	6	3	3
(Chile) C Garín	3	6	6
7	(Argentina) F Comesaña	6	2	7^{7}
(Spain) P Martínez	4	6	6^{4}
Q	(Italy) A Pellegrino	6	2	6
Q	(Argentina) A Barrena	2	6	1
(Argentina) M Navone	3	6	3
(Czech Republic) V Kopřiva	6	0	1^{r}

Second round
8	(Chile) A Tabilo	4	6	6
(Argentina) TA Tirante	6	3	3
(Chile) C Garín	6^{2}	6	5
3	(Argentina) S Báez	7^{7}	1	7
7	(Argentina) F Comesaña	6^{3}	7^{7}	3
Q	(Italy) A Pellegrino	7^{7}	6^{2}	6
(Argentina) M Navone	3	6	4
2	(Italy) L Darderi	6	3	6

Quarterfinals
8	(Chile) A Tabilo	6^{2}	1
3	(Argentina) S Báez	7^{7}	6
Q	(Italy) A Pellegrino	3	6	2
2	(Italy) L Darderi	6	3	6

Semifinals
3	(Argentina) S Báez	4	3
2	(Italy) L Darderi	6	6

== Qualifying ==
=== Seeds ===
1. (Paraguay) Daniel Vallejo (qualified)
2. (Croatia) Dino Prižmić (qualified)
3. (Lithuania) Vilius Gaubas (qualifying competition, lucky loser)
4. (Italy) Andrea Pellegrino (qualified)
5. (Bolivia) Hugo Dellien (qualifying competition)
6. (Portugal) Henrique Rocha (qualifying competition)
7. (Argentina) Alex Barrena (qualified)
8. (Colombia) Daniel Elahi Galán (qualifying competition)

=== Qualifiers ===
1. (Paraguay) Daniel Vallejo
2. (Croatia) Dino Prižmić
3. (Argentina) Alex Barrena
4. (Italy) Andrea Pellegrino

=== Lucky loser ===
1. (Lithuania) Vilius Gaubas

=== Qualifying draw ===
==== First qualifier ====
First round
1	(Paraguay) Daniel Vallejo	6^{3}	6	6
(Brazil) Thiago Monteiro	7^{7}	4	2
Alt	(Brazil) Orlando Luz	3	2
6	(Portugal) Henrique Rocha	6	6

Qualifying competition
1	(Paraguay) Daniel Vallejo	6	6
6	(Portugal) Henrique Rocha	4	2

==== Second qualifier ====
First round
2	(Croatia) Dino Prižmić	6	7
(Brazil) Gustavo Heide	2	5
WC	(Chile) Benjamín Torrealba	1	1
5	(Bolivia) Hugo Dellien	6	6

Qualifying competition
2	(Croatia) Dino Prižmić	6	3	6
5	(Bolivia) Hugo Dellien	3	6	2

==== Third qualifier ====
First round
3	(Lithuania) Vilius Gaubas	6	6
(Brazil) João Lucas Reis da Silva	2	3
Alt	(Chile) Daniel Antonio Núñez	0	3
7	(Argentina) Alex Barrena	6	6

Qualifying competition
3	(Lithuania) Vilius Gaubas	3	1
7	(Argentina) Alex Barrena	6	6

==== Fourth qualifier ====
First round
4	(Italy) Andrea Pellegrino	6	6
WC	(Chile) Nicolás Villalón	3	4
Alt	(Argentina) Facundo Mena	6^{5}	6^{4}
8	(Colombia) Daniel Elahi Galán	7^{7}	7^{7}

Qualifying competition
4	(Italy) Andrea Pellegrino	6^{2}	7^{9}	6
8	(Colombia) Daniel Elahi Galán	7^{7}	6^{7}	4
