= 2003 BellSouth Open =

- Date: 10–16 February
- Edition: 10th
- Category: International Series
- Draw: 32S / 16D
- Prize money: $320,000
- Surface: Clay / outdoor
- Location: Viña del Mar, Chile

Champions

Singles
- (Spain) David Sánchez

Doubles
- (Argentina) Agustín Calleri / (Argentina) Mariano Hood
- Chile Open

The 2003 BellSouth Open was a men's tennis tournament played on outdoor clay courts in Viña del Mar in Chile and was part of the International Series of the 2003 ATP Tour. It was the tenth edition of the tournament and ran from 10 February through 16 February 2003. Unseeded David Sánchez won the singles title.

== Finals ==
=== Singles ===
(Spain) David Sánchez defeated (Chile) Marcelo Ríos 1–6, 6–3, 6–3

- It was Sánchez's 1st singles title of his career.

=== Doubles ===
(Argentina) Agustín Calleri / (Argentina) Mariano Hood defeated (Czech Republic) František Čermák / (Czech Republic) Leoš Friedl 6–3, 1–6, 6–4

- It was Calleri's 1st title of the year and the 1st of his career. It was Hood's 1st title of the year and the 5th of his career.
