= Matt Klinger =

Canadian former professional tennis player (born 1979)

- Full name: Matt Richard Klinger
- Country (sports): Canada
- Born: 17 July 1979 (age 45); Toronto, Ontario, Canada
- Plays: 6 ft 5 in
- Prize money: $17,487

Singles
- Career record: 1–0 (Davis Cup)
- Highest ranking: No. 595 (1 Dec 2003)

Doubles
- Highest ranking: No. 529 (11 Oct 2004)

Matt Richard Klinger (born 17 July 1979) is a Canadian former professional tennis player.

Born in Toronto, Ontario, Klinger is the son of a world ranked men's high jumper who fled communist Poland.

Klinger featured mostly on the ITF Circuit during his time on tour but made the final qualifying round of the 2003 Canada Masters in Montreal. He featured in a 2003 Davis Cup tie against Peru in Calgary, serving 27 aces to beat Willy Lock in straight sets. Before competing professionally he played collegiate tennis for Arizona State University.

== ITF Futures finals ==
=== Singles: 1 (0–1) ===
Result	W–L	Date	Tournament	Surface	Opponent	Score
Loss	0–1	Aug 2002	Mexico F12, Tuxtla Gutiérrez	Hard	(Mexico) Víctor Romero	4–6, 6–7^{(5)}

=== Doubles: 5 (1–4) ===
Result	W–L	Date	Tournament	Surface	Partner	Opponents	Score
Loss	0–1	Jun 2002	Jamaica F8, New Kingston	Hard	(Australia) Matthew Yeates	(Argentina) Nicolas Boeker (United States) Travis Parrott	4–6, 6–1, 2–6
Loss	0–2	Jun 2002	Jamaica F9, Montego Bay	Hard	(Australia) Matthew Yeates	(Germany) Konstantin Harle-Zettler (Republic of Ireland) Kevin Sorensen	6–7^{(5)}, 3–6
Loss	0–3	Jun 2004	Mexico F7, Monterrey	Hard	(Australia) Chris Letcher	(Chile) Juan-Ignacio Cerda (Brazil) Rodrigo-Antonio Grilli	7–6^{(6)}, 3–6, 4–6
Win	1–3	Jul 2004	Canada F5, Ontario	Hard	(Australia) Daniel Wendler	(United States) David Martin (United States) Todd Widom	w/o
Loss	1–4	Sep 2004	Ecuador F1, Guayaquil	Clay	(United Kingdom) Matthew Hanlin	(United States) Levar Harper-Griffith (Netherlands Antilles) Jean-Julien Rojer	w/o

== See also ==
- List of Canada Davis Cup team representatives
