= Golden Swing tournaments =

Tennis tournament series in South America

The Golden Swing tournaments are a series of four tennis tournaments that are part of the Association of Tennis Professionals (ATP) tour, held every February in Latin America. The four tournaments have been termed the ‘Golden Swing’ in honour of Chilean Olympic gold medalists Nicolas Massú and Fernando González.

The series began in 2001, linking four tournaments in Latin America: Viña del Mar (Chile), Buenos Aires (Argentina), Costa do Sauípe (Brazil) and Acapulco (Mexico).

Since the series started in 2001, no player has won more than two titles in one year.

== Tournaments ==
In 2010, the Chile Open was moved from Viña del Mar to Santiago. However, the tournament returned to Viña del Mar only two years later. In 2015, the tournament was bought by investors in Colombia, and moved to Quito, Ecuador. The Ecuador Open's last event was 2018, after which it ceased due to lack of funding, and moved to Córdoba, Argentina.

In 2012, the Brasil Open was moved from Costa do Sauípe to São Paulo and transitioned from outdoors to indoors.

Starting in 2014, the Mexican Open switched from clay to hard courts, serving as a lead-up to the first ATP Masters 1000 event of the season in Indian Wells, United States. The same year, Brazilian investors purchased the ATP 500 level tournament from Memphis which was played on indoor hard courts. They moved it to Rio de Janeiro as the new anchor tournament of the Golden Swing.

In 2019, the Brasil Open was scrapped, and replaced with the Chile Open, with a new edition in 2020. Six years passed between editions of an ATP tournament in Chile. In 2024, the Cordoba Open was scrapped, reducing the tournaments in South America to 3.

=== Tournaments as of 2026 ===
Tournament	Country	Location	Current Venue	Court surface	Category
Argentina Open	Argentina	Buenos Aires	Buenos Aires Lawn Tennis Club	Clay (1970–1989, 1993–1995, 2001–present)	ATP Tour 250
Rio Open	Brazil	Rio de Janeiro	Jockey Club Brasileiro	Clay (2014–present)	ATP Tour 500
Chile Open	Chile	Viña del Mar (2001–09, 2012–2014); Santiago (1993–1998, 2010–11, 2020–present)	Estadio San Carlos de Apoquindo	Clay (1993–1998, 2000–2014, 2020–present)	ATP Tour 250

=== Former Golden Swing tournaments ===
The Ecuador Open and Brasil Open have been disbanded while the Mexican Open has rebranded itself as a hard court lead-up tournament to the Indian Wells and Miami Masters.

Tournament	Country	Location	Last/Current Venue	Court surface	Category
Córdoba Open	Argentina	Córdoba	Polo Deportivo Kempes	Clay (2019–2024)	ATP Tour 250
Ecuador Open	Ecuador	Quito (2015–2018)	Club Jacarandá	Clay (2015–2018)	ATP Tour 250
Mexican Open	Mexico	Acapulco (2001–present); Mexico City (1993–1998, 2000)	Fairmont Acapulco Princess	Clay (1993–1998, 2000–2013); Hard (2014–present)	ATP Tour 500
Brasil Open	Brazil	Costa do Sauípe (2001–11); São Paulo (2012–2019)	Complexo Desportivo Constâncio Vaz Guimarães	Hard (2001–03); Clay (2004–11); Indoor clay (2012–2019)	ATP World Tour 250

== Champions by year ==
Win number out of total wins are shown in parentheses for players with more than one Golden Swing title since the series started in 2001. Purple shading indicates the tournament was played on hard courts.

2001–2024
Year	Viña del Mar / Santiago	Buenos Aires	Costa do Sauípe / São Paulo	Acapulco
2001	(Argentina) Guillermo Coria (1/2)	(Brazil) Gustavo Kuerten (1/3)	(Czech Republic) Jan Vacek	(Brazil) Gustavo Kuerten (2/3)
2002	(Chile) Fernando González (1/4)	(Chile) Nicolás Massú (1/2)	(Brazil) Gustavo Kuerten	(Spain) Carlos Moyà (1/4)
2003	(Spain) David Sánchez	(Spain) Carlos Moyà (2/4)	(Netherlands) Sjeng Schalken	(Argentina) Agustín Calleri
2004	(Chile) Fernando González (2/4)	(Argentina) Guillermo Coria (2/2)	(Brazil) Gustavo Kuerten (3/3)	(Spain) Carlos Moyà (3/4)
2005	(Argentina) Gastón Gaudio (1/2)	(Argentina) Gastón Gaudio (2/2)	(Spain) Rafael Nadal (1/6)	(Spain) Rafael Nadal (2/6)
2006	(Argentina) José Acasuso	(Spain) Carlos Moyà (4/4)	(Chile) Nicolás Massú (2/2)	(Peru) Luis Horna (1/2)
2007	(Peru) Luis Horna (2/2)	(Argentina) Juan Mónaco (1/2)	(Argentina) Guillermo Cañas	(Argentina) Juan Ignacio Chela
2008	(Chile) Fernando González (3/4)	(Argentina) David Nalbandian	(Spain) Nicolás Almagro (1/6)	(Spain) Nicolás Almagro (2/6)
2009	(Chile) Fernando González (4/4)	(Spain) Tommy Robredo (1/3)	(Spain) Tommy Robredo (2/3)	(Spain) Nicolás Almagro (3/6)
2010	(Brazil) Thomaz Bellucci	(Spain) Juan Carlos Ferrero (1/2)	(Spain) Juan Carlos Ferrero (2/2)	(Spain) David Ferrer (1/7)
2011	(Spain) Tommy Robredo (3/3)	(Spain) Nicolás Almagro (4/6)	(Spain) Nicolás Almagro (5/6)	(Spain) David Ferrer (2/7)
2012	(Argentina) Juan Mónaco (2/2)	(Spain) David Ferrer (3/7)	(Spain) Nicolás Almagro (6/6)	(Spain) David Ferrer (4/7)
2013	(Argentina) Horacio Zeballos	(Spain) David Ferrer (5/7)	(Spain) Rafael Nadal (3/6)	(Spain) Rafael Nadal (4/6)
	Viña del Mar	Buenos Aires	Rio de Janeiro	São Paulo
2014	(Italy) Fabio Fognini (1/2)	(Spain) David Ferrer (6/7)	(Spain) Rafael Nadal (5/6)	(Argentina) Federico Delbonis
	Quito	Buenos Aires	Rio de Janeiro	São Paulo
2015	(Dominican Republic) Víctor Estrella Burgos (1/3)	(Spain) Rafael Nadal (6/6)	(Spain) David Ferrer (7/7)	(Uruguay) Pablo Cuevas (1/4)
2016	(Dominican Republic) Víctor Estrella Burgos (2/3)	(Austria) Dominic Thiem (1/3)	(Uruguay) Pablo Cuevas (2/4)	(Uruguay) Pablo Cuevas (3/4)
2017	(Dominican Republic) Víctor Estrella Burgos (3/3)	(Ukraine) Alexandr Dolgopolov	(Austria) Dominic Thiem (2/3)	(Uruguay) Pablo Cuevas (4/4)
2018	(Spain) Roberto Carballés Baena	(Austria) Dominic Thiem (3/3)	(Argentina) Diego Schwartzman (1/2)	(Italy) Fabio Fognini (2/2)
	Córdoba	Buenos Aires	Rio de Janeiro	São Paulo
2019	(Argentina) Juan Ignacio Londero	(Italy) Marco Cecchinato	(Serbia) Laslo Djere (1/2)	(Argentina) Guido Pella
	Córdoba	Buenos Aires	Rio de Janeiro	Santiago
2020	(Chile) Cristian Garín (1/3)	(Norway) Casper Ruud (1/2)	(Chile) Cristian Garín (2/3)	(Brazil) Thiago Seyboth Wild
2021	(Argentina) Juan Manuel Cerúndolo	(Argentina) Diego Schwartzman (2/2)	Not held	(Chile) Cristian Garín (3/3)
2022	(Spain) Albert Ramos Viñolas	(Norway) Casper Ruud (2/2)	(Spain) Carlos Alcaraz (1/2)	(Spain) Pedro Martínez
2023	(Argentina) Sebastián Báez (1/4)	(Spain) Carlos Alcaraz (2/2)	(United Kingdom) Cameron Norrie	(Chile) Nicolás Jarry
2024	(Italy) Luciano Darderi (1/2)	(Argentina) Facundo Díaz Acosta	(Argentina) Sebastián Báez (2/4)	(Argentina) Sebastián Báez (3/4)

2025–present
Year	(Argentina) Buenos Aires	(Brazil) Rio de Janeiro	(Chile) Santiago
2025	(Brazil) João Fonseca	(Argentina) Sebastián Báez (4/4)	(Serbia) Laslo Djere (2/2)
2026	(Argentina) Francisco Cerúndolo	(Argentina) Tomás Martín Etcheverry	(Italy) Luciano Darderi (2/2)

== Multiple winners ==
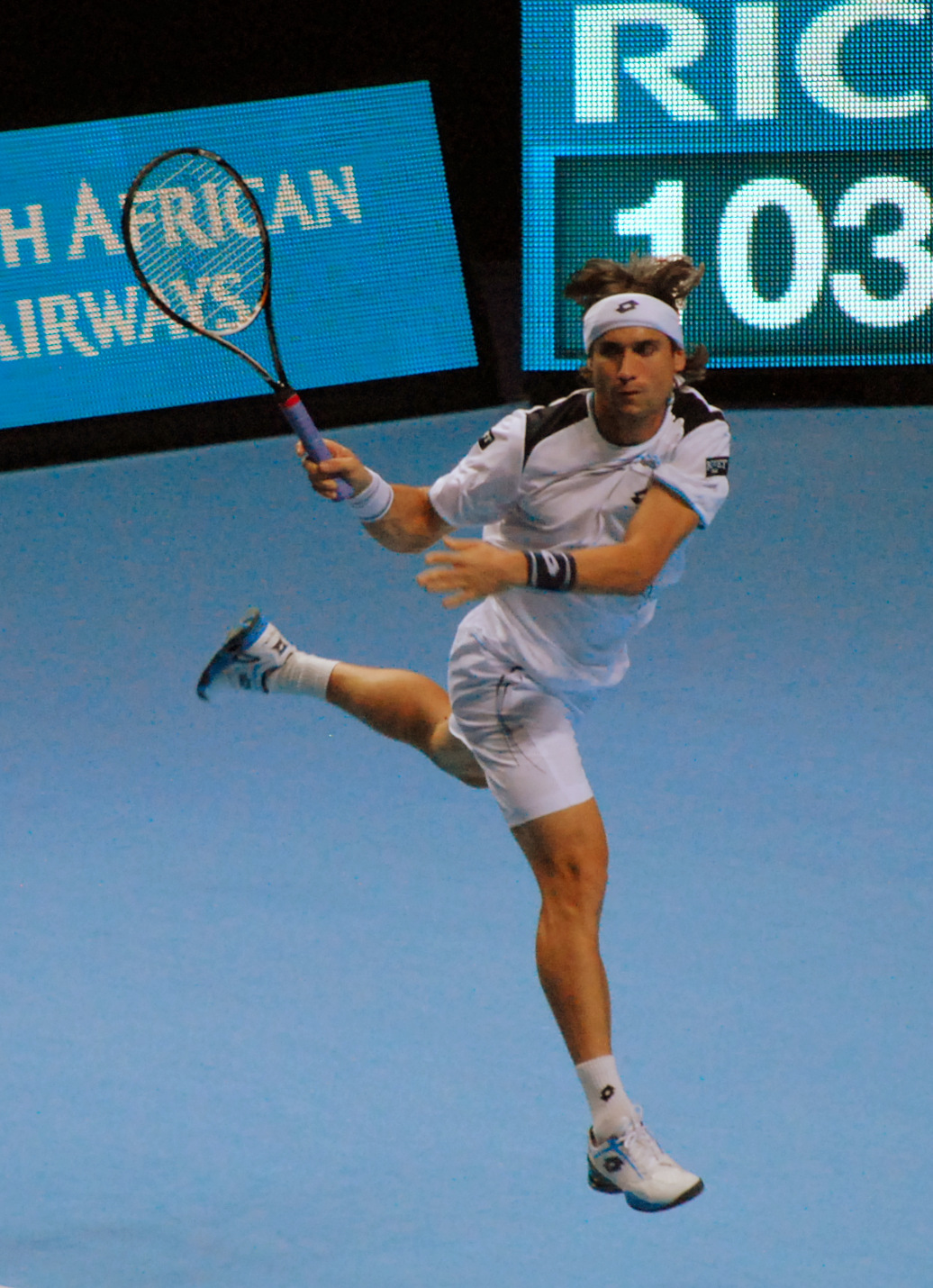
David Ferrer won 7 Golden Swing tournaments, more than any other player.

Rank	Country	Player	Winning span	(Chile) (Ecuador) (Argentina)	(Argentina)	(Mexico) (Brazil)	(Brazil) (Chile)	Total
1	Spain	David Ferrer	2010–2015	0	3	4	0	7
2	Spain	Nicolás Almagro	2007–2012	0	1	2	3	6
2	Spain	Rafael Nadal	2005–2015	0	1	3	2	6
4	Spain	Carlos Moyà	2002–2006	0	2	2	0	4
4	Chile	Fernando González	2002–2009	4	0	0	0	4
4	Uruguay	Pablo Cuevas	2015–2017	0	0	1	3	4
4	Argentina	Sebastián Báez	2023–2025	1	0	2	1	4
8	Dominican Republic	Victor Estrella Burgos	2015–2017	3	0	0	0	3
8	Chile	Cristian Garín	2020–2021	1	0	1	1	3
8	Brazil	Gustavo Kuerten	2001–2004	0	1	1	1	3
8	Spain	Tommy Robredo	2009–2011	1	1	0	1	3
8	Austria	Dominic Thiem	2016–2018	0	2	1	0	3
13	Spain	Carlos Alcaraz	2022–2023	0	1	1	0	2
13	Argentina	Guillermo Coria	2001–2004	1	1	0	0	2
13	Spain	Juan Carlos Ferrero	2010	0	1	0	1	2
13	Italy	Fabio Fognini	2014–2018	1	0	0	1	2
13	Argentina	Gastón Gaudio	2005	1	1	0	0	2
13	Peru	Luis Horna	2006–2007	1	0	1	0	2
13	Chile	Nicolas Massú	2002–2006	0	1	0	1	2
13	Argentina	Juan Mónaco	2007–2012	1	1	0	0	2
13	Argentina	Diego Schwartzman	2018–2021	0	1	1	0	2
13	Norway	Casper Ruud	2020–2022	0	2	0	0	2
13	Serbia	Laslo Djere	2019–2025	0	0	1	1	2
13	Italy	Luciano Darderi	2024–2026	1	0	0	1	2
