= 1980 Santiago International Championships =

- Date: 24–30 November
- Edition: 5th
- Category: Grand Prix
- Draw: 32S / 16D
- Prize money: $50,000
- Surface: Clay / outdoor
- Location: Santiago, Chile

Champions

Singles
- (Paraguay) Víctor Pecci

Doubles
- (Ecuador) Ricardo Ycaza / (Chile) Belus Prajoux
- Chilean Open

The 1980 Santiago International Championships was a men's tennis tournament played on outdoor clay courts in Santiago, Chile that was part of the Grand Prix tennis circuit. It was the fifth edition of the tournament and was held from 24 November through 30 November 1980. Third-seeded Víctor Pecci won the singles title.

== Finals ==
=== Singles ===
(Paraguay) Víctor Pecci defeated (France) Christophe Freyss 4–6, 6–4, 6–3

- It was Pecci's 1st singles title of the year and the 7th of his career.

=== Doubles ===
(Ecuador) Ricardo Ycaza / (Chile) Belus Prajoux defeated (Brazil) Carlos Kirmayr / (Brazil) João Soares 4–6, 7–6, 6–4
