= 2021 Chile Open – Singles =

Singles
- 2021 Chile Open

Final
- Champion: (Chile) Cristian Garín
- Runner-up: (Argentina) Facundo Bagnis
- Score: 6–4, 6–7^{(3–7)}, 7–5

Details
- Draw: 28
- Seeds: 8

Events
Singles	Doubles
- Chile Open

Cristian Garín defeated Facundo Bagnis in the final, 6–4, 6–7^{(3–7)}, 7–5 to capture the men's singles tennis title at the 2021 Chile Open.

Thiago Seyboth Wild was the defending champion, but chose not to defend his title.

== Seeds ==
The top four seeds received a bye into the second round.

1. (Chile) Cristian Garín (champion)
2. (France) Benoît Paire (second round)
3. (Spain) Pablo Andújar (second round)
4. (Serbia) Laslo Đere (quarterfinals)
5. (United States) Frances Tiafoe (second round)
6. (Italy) Salvatore Caruso (first round)
7. (Argentina) Federico Coria (second round)
8. (Argentina) Federico Delbonis (semifinals)

== Draw ==
Key

- Q = Qualifier
- WC = Wild card
- LL = Lucky loser
- Alt = Alternate
- ITF = ITF entry
- PR = Protected ranking
- SR = Special ranking
- SE = Special exempt
- JE = Junior exempt
- JR = Junior Accelerator Programme entrant
- CO = College Accelerator Programme entrant
- NG = Next Gen Accelerator Program entrant
- w/o = Walkover
- r = Retired
- d = Defaulted

=== Finals ===
Semifinals
1	(Chile) Cristian Garín	6	6
(Colombia) Daniel Elahi Galán	4	3
(Argentina) Facundo Bagnis	7	6
8	(Argentina) Federico Delbonis	5	3

Final
1	(Chile) Cristian Garín	6	6^{3}	7
(Argentina) Facundo Bagnis	4	7^{7}	5

=== Top half ===
First round
(Slovakia) J Kovalík	1	6	4
Q	(Chile) A Tabilo	6	0	6
(Portugal) J Sousa	4	1
Q	(Peru) JP Varillas	6	6
(Italy) G Mager	6	6^{4}	6^{4}
7	(Argentina) F Coria	4	7^{7}	7^{7}
(Colombia) DE Galán	7^{7}	3	7
(Germany) D Altmaier	6^{2}	6	5
WC	(Chile) G Lama	5	2
WC	(Argentina) JM Cerúndolo	7	6
(Spain) R Carballés Baena	6	7^{7}
6	(Italy) S Caruso	4	6^{5}

Second round
1	(Chile) C Garín	6	6
Q	(Chile) A Tabilo	2	2
Q	(Peru) JP Varillas	6	7^{7}
7	(Argentina) F Coria	4	6^{2}
3	(Spain) P Andújar	1	6^{7}
(Colombia) DE Galán	6	7^{9}
WC	(Argentina) JM Cerúndolo	2	0
(Spain) R Carballés Baena	6	6

Quarterfinals
1	(Chile) C Garín	6	6
Q	(Peru) JP Varillas	4	4
(Colombia) DE Galán	7^{10}	6
(Spain) R Carballés Baena	6^{8}	3

Semifinals
1	(Chile) C Garín	6	6
(Colombia) DE Galán	4	3

=== Bottom half ===
First round
5	(United States) F Tiafoe	7^{9}	6^{7}	7^{9}
WC	(Chile) N Jarry	6^{7}	7^{9}	6^{7}
(Argentina) F Bagnis	6^{4}	6	6
(Italy) M Cecchinato	7^{7}	2	3
(Portugal) P Sousa	6	6
(Argentina) L Mayer	2	4
8	(Argentina) F Delbonis	6	6^{5}	6
(Spain) J Munar	4	7^{7}	4
SE	(Argentina) F Cerúndolo	1	2
(Slovakia) A Martin	6	6
Q	(Denmark) H Rune	6	6
Q	(Argentina) S Báez	3	2

Second round
5	(United States) F Tiafoe	6^{3}	6^{2}
(Argentina) F Bagnis	7^{7}	7^{7}
(Portugal) P Sousa	7	5	3
4	(Serbia) L Đere	5	7	6
8	(Argentina) F Delbonis	6	6
(Slovakia) A Martin	0	3
Q	(Denmark) H Rune	6	6
2	(France) B Paire	2	3

Quarterfinals
(Argentina) F Bagnis	4	6	6
4	(Serbia) L Đere	6	3	3
8	(Argentina) F Delbonis	6	6
Q	(Denmark) H Rune	3	3

Semifinals
(Argentina) F Bagnis	7	6
8	(Argentina) F Delbonis	5	3

== Qualifying ==
=== Seeds ===
1. (Chile) Alejandro Tabilo (qualified)
2. (Peru) Juan Pablo Varillas (qualified)
3. (Ecuador) Emilio Gómez (second round)
4. (Portugal) João Domingues (first round)
5. (Spain) Mario Vilella Martínez (second round)
6. (Brazil) João Menezes (second round)
7. (Argentina) Andrea Collarini (first round)
8. (Argentina) Tomás Martín Etcheverry (second round)

=== Qualifiers ===
1. (Chile) Alejandro Tabilo
2. (Peru) Juan Pablo Varillas
3. (Denmark) Holger Rune
4. (Argentina) Sebastián Báez

=== Qualifying draw ===
==== First qualifier ====
First round
1	(Chile) Alejandro Tabilo	6	6
(Peru) Nicolás Álvarez	4	3
Alt	(Brazil) Rafael Matos	3	1
(Brazil) Pedro Sakamoto	6	6
Alt	(Argentina) Agustín Velotti	6	6
WC	(Chile) Daniel Antonio Núñez	4	3
(Chile) Marcelo Tomás Barrios Vera	4	6	4
8	(Argentina) Tomás Martín Etcheverry	6	2	6

Second round
1	(Chile) Alejandro Tabilo	7^{7}	6
(Brazil) Pedro Sakamoto	6^{0}	4
Alt	(Argentina) Agustín Velotti	7	4	6
8	(Argentina) Tomás Martín Etcheverry	5	6	3

Qualifying competition
1	(Chile) Alejandro Tabilo	7^{7}	6
Alt	(Argentina) Agustín Velotti	6^{1}	1

==== Second qualifier ====
First round
2	(Peru) Juan Pablo Varillas	4	7	7^{7}
(Sweden) Christian Lindell	6	5	6^{3}
(Argentina) Camilo Ugo Carabelli	6	2	2
(France) Geoffrey Blancaneaux	3	6	6
(Brazil) Guilherme Clezar	4	2
(Brazil) Felipe Meligeni Alves	6	6
(Slovakia) Lukáš Klein	4	2
5	(Spain) Mario Vilella Martínez	6	6

Second round
2	(Peru) Juan Pablo Varillas	6	6
(France) Geoffrey Blancaneaux	2	2
(Brazil) Felipe Meligeni Alves	3	7^{7}	7^{7}
5	(Spain) Mario Vilella Martínez	6	6^{5}	6^{3}

Qualifying competition
2	(Peru) Juan Pablo Varillas	6	6
(Brazil) Felipe Meligeni Alves	4	1

==== Third qualifier ====
First round
3	(Ecuador) Emilio Gómez	6	6
(Argentina) Facundo Mena	2	3
WC	(Denmark) Holger Rune	7^{7}	2	6
(Portugal) Gonçalo Oliveira	6^{3}	6	2
(Spain) Carlos Gómez-Herrera	6	4	4
(Argentina) Renzo Olivo	2	6	6
(Argentina) Hernán Casanova	4	6	6
7	(Argentina) Andrea Collarini	6	3	2

Second round
3	(Ecuador) Emilio Gómez	3	6	1
WC	(Denmark) Holger Rune	6	4	6
(Argentina) Renzo Olivo	6^{4}	6	6
(Argentina) Hernán Casanova	7^{7}	2	3

Qualifying competition
WC	(Denmark) Holger Rune	4	6	6
(Argentina) Renzo Olivo	6	3	4

==== Fourth qualifier ====
First round
4	(Portugal) João Domingues	4	2
WC	(Argentina) Nicolás Kicker	6	6
(Morocco) Elliot Benchetrit	2	2
(Brazil) Thomaz Bellucci	6	6
(Argentina) Sebastián Báez	6	6^{5}	6
(Brazil) Orlando Luz	2	7^{7}	2
WC	(Chile) Michel Vernier	2	3
6	(Brazil) João Menezes	6	6

Second round
WC	(Argentina) Nicolás Kicker	6	6
(Brazil) Thomaz Bellucci	0	4
(Argentina) Sebastián Báez	7^{8}	2	6
6	(Brazil) João Menezes	6^{6}	6	2

Qualifying competition
WC	(Argentina) Nicolás Kicker	6	4	1
(Argentina) Sebastián Báez	3	6	6
