= 1979 Santiago International Classic =

Tennis tournament

- Date: 26 November – 2 December
- Edition: 4th
- Category: Grand Prix
- Draw: 32S / 16D
- Prize money: $50,000
- Surface: Clay / outdoor
- Location: Santiago, Chile

Champions

Singles
- (Chile) Hans Gildemeister

Doubles
- (Spain) José Higueras / (Colombia) Jairo Velasco, Sr. (Chile) Álvaro Fillol / (Chile) Jaime Fillol
- Chilean Open

The 1979 Santiago International Classic was a men's tennis tournament played on outdoor clay courts in Santiago, Chile that was part of the Grand Prix tennis circuit. It was the fourth edition of the tournament and was held from 26 November through 2 December 1979. Second-seeded Hans Gildemeister won the singles title.

== Finals ==
=== Singles ===
(Chile) Hans Gildemeister defeated (Spain) José Higueras 7–5, 5–7, 6–4

- It was Gildemeister's second and last singles title of the year and the second of his career.

=== Doubles ===
(Spain) José Higueras / (Colombia) Jairo Velasco, Sr. vs. (Chile) Álvaro Fillol / (Chile) Jaime Fillol tied at 2–2 in third set
