= 2026 Chile Open – Doubles =

Doubles
- 2026 Chile Open

Final
- Champions: (Brazil) Orlando Luz (Brazil) Rafael Matos
- Runners-up: (Uruguay) Ariel Behar (Australia) Matthew Romios
- Score: 6–4, 6–3

Events
Singles	Doubles
- Chile Open

Orlando Luz and Rafael Matos defeated Ariel Behar and Matthew Romios in the final, 6–4, 6–3 to win the doubles tennis title at the 2026 Chile Open.

Nicolás Barrientos and Rithvik Choudary Bollipalli were the reigning champions, but Bollipalli did not participate this year. Barrientos partnered Emilio Nava, but lost in the first round to Sander Gillé and Sem Verbeek.

== Seeds ==
1. (Argentina) Máximo González / (Argentina) Andrés Molteni (first round)
2. (Brazil) Orlando Luz / (Brazil) Rafael Matos (champions)
3. (Brazil) Marcelo Demoliner / (Brazil) Fernando Romboli (first round)
4. (Belgium) Sander Gillé / (Netherlands) Sem Verbeek (quarterfinals)

== Draw ==
Key

- Q = Qualifier
- WC = Wild card
- LL = Lucky loser
- Alt = Alternate
- ITF = ITF entry
- PR = Protected ranking
- SR = Special ranking
- SE = Special exempt
- JE = Junior exempt
- JR = Junior Accelerator Programme entrant
- CO = College Accelerator Programme entrant
- NG = Next Gen Accelerator Program entrant
- w/o = Walkover
- r = Retired
- d = Defaulted

=== Draw ===
First round
1	(Argentina) M González (Argentina) A Molteni	7^{8}	3	[5]
Alt	(Germany) J Schnaitter (Germany) M Wallner	6^{6}	6	[10]
PR	(India) A Kadhe (Japan) T Yuzuki	7^{8}	6^{8}	[6]
(Uruguay) A Behar (Australia) M Romios	6^{6}	7^{10}	[10]
3	(Brazil) M Demoliner (Brazil) F Romboli	1	3
(New Zealand) F Reynolds (New Zealand) J Watt	6	6
Alt	(Chile) M Soto (Bolivia) F Zeballos	6	3	[10]
Alt	(Portugal) J Faria (Portugal) H Rocha	3	6	[12]
(United States) M Kiger (United States) R Stalder	6	6^{2}	[5]
(Ecuador) D Hidalgo (United States) P Trhac	3	7^{7}	[10]
(Colombia) N Barrientos (United States) E Nava	6^{4}	6	[6]
4	(Belgium) S Gillé (Netherlands) S Verbeek	7^{7}	4	[10]
WC	(Chile) N Jarry (Chile) D Jarry Fillol	5	6^{10}
(Ecuador) G Escobar (Netherlands) J-J Rojer	7	7^{12}
Alt	(Colombia) DE Galán (Denmark) E Møller	4	4
2	(Brazil) O Luz (Brazil) R Matos	6	6

Quarterfinals
Alt	(Germany) J Schnaitter (Germany) M Wallner	4	6^{5}
(Uruguay) A Behar (Australia) M Romios	6	7^{7}
(New Zealand) F Reynolds (New Zealand) J Watt	6	6^{5}	[10]
Alt	(Portugal) J Faria (Portugal) H Rocha	4	7^{7}	[7]
(Ecuador) D Hidalgo (United States) P Trhac	6	7^{7}
4	(Belgium) S Gillé (Netherlands) S Verbeek	3	6^{3}
(Ecuador) G Escobar (Netherlands) J-J Rojer	6^{7}	6^{8}
2	(Brazil) O Luz (Brazil) R Matos	7^{9}	7^{10}

Semifinals
(Uruguay) A Behar (Australia) M Romios	7^{7}	6
(New Zealand) F Reynolds (New Zealand) J Watt	6^{3}	3
(Ecuador) D Hidalgo (United States) P Trhac	6^{4}	3
2	(Brazil) O Luz (Brazil) R Matos	7^{7}	6

Final
(Uruguay) A Behar (Australia) M Romios	4	3
2	(Brazil) O Luz (Brazil) R Matos	6	6
