= 2024 Chile Open – Singles =

Singles
- 2024 Chile Open

Final
- Champion: (Argentina) Sebastián Báez
- Runner-up: (Chile) Alejandro Tabilo
- Score: 3–6, 6–0, 6–4

Details
- Draw: 28 (4 Q / 3 WC )
- Seeds: 8

Events
Singles	Doubles
- Chile Open

Sebastián Báez defeated Alejandro Tabilo in the final, 3–6, 6–0, 6–4 to win the singles tennis title at the 2024 Chile Open. It was his sixth career ATP Tour title and his second title in as many weeks, having won the Rio Open the week before.

Nicolás Jarry was the defending champion, but lost in the quarterfinals to Corentin Moutet.

== Seeds ==
The top four seeds received a bye into the second round.

1. (Chile) Nicolás Jarry (quarterfinals)
2. (Argentina) Sebastián Báez (champion)
3. (France) Arthur Fils (quarterfinals)
4. (Chile) Alejandro Tabilo (final)
5. (Germany) Yannick Hanfmann (first round)
6. (Argentina) Facundo Díaz Acosta (second round)
7. (Spain) Roberto Carballés Baena (first round)
8. (Spain) Jaume Munar (quarterfinals)

== Draw ==
Key

- Q = Qualifier
- WC = Wild card
- LL = Lucky loser
- Alt = Alternate
- ITF = ITF entry
- PR = Protected ranking
- SR = Special ranking
- SE = Special exempt
- JE = Junior exempt
- JR = Junior Accelerator Programme entrant
- CO = College Accelerator Programme entrant
- NG = Next Gen Accelerator Program entrant
- w/o = Walkover
- r = Retired
- d = Defaulted

=== Finals ===
Semifinals
Q	(France) Corentin Moutet	6	4	5
4	(Chile) Alejandro Tabilo	4	6	7
(Spain) Pedro Martínez	4	2
2	(Argentina) Sebastián Báez	6	6

Final
4	(Chile) Alejandro Tabilo	6	0	4
2	(Argentina) Sebastián Báez	3	6	6

=== Top half ===
First round
Q	(Slovakia) A Molčan	1	6^{1}
(Argentina) F Coria	6	7^{7}
(Argentina) TA Tirante	7	7^{7}
WC	(Brazil) J Fonseca	5	6^{3}
Q	(France) C Moutet	6	5	6
7	(Spain) R Carballés Baena	3	7	2
(Chile) C Garín	6^{3}	5
(Chile) T Barrios Vera	7^{7}	7
LL	(Argentina) F Bagnis	6^{4}	7^{8}	6^{5}
WC	(Italy) L Darderi	7^{7}	6^{6}	7^{7}
Q	(Argentina) JM Cerúndolo	3	6	7
5	(Germany) Y Hanfmann	6	3	5

Second round
1	(Chile) N Jarry	7^{7}	6
(Argentina) F Coria	6^{4}	2
(Argentina) TA Tirante	3	7^{7}	2
Q	(France) C Moutet	6	6^{5}	6
4	(Chile) A Tabilo	6	7
(Chile) T Barrios Vera	2	5
WC	(Italy) L Darderi	6	3	6
Q	(Argentina) JM Cerúndolo	3	6	3

Quarterfinals
1	(Chile) N Jarry	6^{5}	6^{3}
Q	(France) C Moutet	7^{7}	7^{7}
4	(Chile) A Tabilo	6	7
WC	(Italy) L Darderi	0	5

Semifinals
Q	(France) C Moutet	6	4	5
4	(Chile) A Tabilo	4	6	7

=== Bottom half ===
First round
6	(Argentina) F Díaz Acosta	5	6	7^{7}
(Argentina) P Cachín	7	3	6^{2}
WC	(Italy) F Passaro	4	1
(Spain) P Martínez	6	6
(Brazil) T Seyboth Wild	6	6
Q	(Argentina) RA Burruchaga	4	4
8	(Spain) J Munar	6	6
(Spain) B Zapata Miralles	4	1
(Spain) A Ramos Viñolas	6	6
(Bolivia) H Dellien	3	2
LL	(Argentina) F Comesaña	2	6	1
(Peru) JP Varillas	6	3	6

Second round
6	(Argentina) F Díaz Acosta	6^{4}	7^{7}	1
(Spain) P Martínez	7^{7}	6^{5}	6
(Brazil) T Seyboth Wild	3	3
3	(France) A Fils	6	6
8	(Spain) J Munar	6	6
(Spain) A Ramos Viñolas	3	1
(Peru) JP Varillas	6	4	2
2	(Argentina) S Báez	4	6	6

Quarterfinals
(Spain) P Martínez	6	6^{5}	6
3	(France) A Fils	3	7^{7}	2
8	(Spain) J Munar	4	4
2	(Argentina) S Báez	6	6

Semifinals
(Spain) P Martínez	4	2
2	(Argentina) S Báez	6	6

== Qualifying ==
=== Seeds ===
1. (Argentina) Francisco Comesaña (qualifying competition, lucky loser)
2. (Slovakia) Alex Molčan (qualified)
3. (Argentina) Camilo Ugo Carabelli (first round)
4. (Bolivia) Hugo Dellien (moved to main draw)
5. (Italy) Andrea Vavassori (first round)
6. (Argentina) Facundo Bagnis (qualifying competition, lucky loser)
7. (France) Corentin Moutet (qualified)
8. (Italy) Andrea Pellegrino (first round)

=== Qualifiers ===
1. (Argentina) Román Andrés Burruchaga
2. (Slovakia) Alex Molčan
3. (Argentina) Juan Manuel Cerúndolo
4. (France) Corentin Moutet

=== Lucky losers ===
1. (Argentina) Francisco Comesaña
2. (Argentina) Facundo Bagnis

=== Qualifying draw ===
==== First qualifier ====
First round
1	(Argentina) Francisco Comesaña	6	5	7^{7}
WC	(Peru) Ignacio Buse	1	7	6^{2}
(Argentina) Román Andrés Burruchaga	6	4	6
8	(Italy) Andrea Pellegrino	3	6	1

Qualifying competition
1	(Argentina) Francisco Comesaña	3	1
(Argentina) Román Andrés Burruchaga	6	6

==== Second qualifier ====
First round
2	(Slovakia) Alex Molčan	6	7^{7}
(Italy) Marco Cecchinato	2	6^{4}
Alt	(Italy) Edoardo Lavagno	3	7^{7}	3
6/Alt	(Argentina) Facundo Bagnis	6	6^{3}	6

Qualifying competition
2	(Slovakia) Alex Molčan	6	6
6/Alt	(Argentina) Facundo Bagnis	4	4

==== Third qualifier ====
First round
3	(Argentina) Camilo Ugo Carabelli	1	6^{4}
(Argentina) Juan Manuel Cerúndolo	6	7^{7}
WC	(Chile) Matías Soto	7^{12}	7^{8}
5	(Italy) Andrea Vavassori	6^{10}	6^{6}

Qualifying competition
(Argentina) Juan Manuel Cerúndolo	6	6
WC	(Chile) Matías Soto	4	4

==== Fourth qualifier ====
First round
Alt	(Bolivia) Murkel Dellien	6	6
Alt	(Argentina) Juan Pablo Ficovich	3	2
(Argentina) Genaro Alberto Olivieri	4	7	0
7	(France) Corentin Moutet	6	5	6

Qualifying competition
Alt	(Bolivia) Murkel Dellien	4	2
7	(France) Corentin Moutet	6	6
