= 1978 Chilean International Championships =

- Date: 27 November – 3 December
- Edition: 3rd
- Category: Grand Prix
- Draw: 32S / 16D
- Prize money: $75,000
- Surface: Clay / outdoor
- Location: Santiago, Chile

Champions

Singles
- (Argentina) José Luis Clerc

Doubles
- (Chile) Hans Gildemeister / (Paraguay) Víctor Pecci
- Chilean Open

The 1978 Chilean International Championships was a men's tennis tournament played on outdoor clay courts in Santiago, Chile that was part of the Grand Prix tennis circuit. It was the third edition of the tournament and was held from 27 November through 3 December 1978. Third-seeded José Luis Clerc won the singles title.

== Finals ==
=== Singles ===
(Argentina) José Luis Clerc defeated (Chile) Víctor Pecci 3–6, 6–3, 6–1

- It was Clerc's 3rd singles title of the year and of his career.

=== Doubles ===
(Chile) Hans Gildemeister / (Paraguay) Víctor Pecci defeated (Chile) Álvaro Fillol / (Chile) Jaime Fillol 6–4, 6–3
