= 2022 Chile Open – Singles =

Singles
- 2022 Chile Open

Final
- Champion: (Spain) Pedro Martínez
- Runner-up: (Argentina) Sebastián Báez
- Score: 4–6, 6–4, 6–4

Details
- Draw: 28 (4 Q / 3 WC )
- Seeds: 8

Events
Singles	Doubles
- Chile Open

Pedro Martínez defeated Sebastián Báez in the final, 4–6, 6–4, 6–4 to win the singles title at the 2022 Chile Open. It was his first ATP Tour title.

Cristian Garín was the defending champion, but lost in the second round to Alejandro Tabilo.

== Seeds ==
The top four seeds received a bye into the second round.

1. (Chile) Cristian Garín (second round)
2. (Spain) Albert Ramos Viñolas (semifinals)
3. (Argentina) Federico Delbonis (second round)
4. (Spain) Pedro Martínez (champion)
5. (Argentina) Federico Coria (first round)
6. (Serbia) Miomir Kecmanović (quarterfinals)
7. (Argentina) Sebastián Báez (final)
8. (Argentina) Facundo Bagnis (quarterfinals)

== Draw ==
Key

- Q = Qualifier
- WC = Wild card
- LL = Lucky loser
- Alt = Alternate
- ITF = ITF entry
- PR = Protected ranking
- SR = Special ranking
- SE = Special exempt
- JE = Junior exempt
- JR = Junior Accelerator Programme entrant
- CO = College Accelerator Programme entrant
- NG = Next Gen Accelerator Program entrant
- w/o = Walkover
- r = Retired
- d = Defaulted

=== Finals ===
Semifinals
WC	(Chile) Alejandro Tabilo	7	4	4
4	(Spain) Pedro Martínez	5	6	6
7	(Argentina) Sebastián Báez	6	4	6
2	(Spain) Albert Ramos Viñolas	4	6	2

Final
4	(Spain) Pedro Martínez	4	6	6
7	(Argentina) Sebastián Báez	6	4	4

=== Top half ===
First round
Q	(Argentina) R Olivo	1	3
WC	(Chile) A Tabilo	6	6
(Denmark) H Rune	4	4
Q	(Brazil) M Pucinelli de Almeida	6	6
(Italy) M Cecchinato	5	1
6	(Serbia) M Kecmanović	7	6
(Colombia) DE Galán	1	3
(Spain) J Munar	6	6
LL	(Argentina) N Kicker	4	6	4
WC	(Brazil) T Seyboth Wild	6	3	6
PR	(Germany) Y Hanfmann	3	6	6
5	(Argentina) F Coria	6	2	4

Second round
1	(Chile) C Garín	3	3
WC	(Chile) A Tabilo	6	6
Q	(Brazil) M Pucinelli de Almeida	2	0
6	(Serbia) M Kecmanović	6	6
4	(Spain) P Martínez	6	5	7
(Spain) J Munar	4	7	5
WC	(Brazil) T Seyboth Wild	1	3
PR	(Germany) Y Hanfmann	6	6

Quarterfinals
WC	(Chile) A Tabilo	6	6
6	(Serbia) M Kecmanović	1	4
4	(Spain) P Martínez	6	6
PR	(Germany) Y Hanfmann	2	2

Semifinals
WC	(Chile) A Tabilo	7	4	4
4	(Spain) P Martínez	5	6	6

=== Bottom half ===
First round
7	(Argentina) S Báez	6	6
(Peru) JP Varillas	4	4
(Argentina) TM Etcheverry	6	4	5
Q	(Argentina) JI Londero	4	6	7
WC	(Chile) N Jarry	6^{9}	4
(Brazil) T Monteiro	7^{11}	6
8	(Argentina) F Bagnis	6	6
(Spain) B Zapata Miralles	3	0
(Bolivia) H Dellien	6	6
Q	(Chile) G Lama	3	4
(Spain) C Taberner	6	7
(Argentina) JM Cerúndolo	2	5

Second round
7	(Argentina) S Báez	6	6
Q	(Argentina) JI Londero	3	3
(Brazil) T Monteiro	3	6	6
3	(Argentina) F Delbonis	6	4	1
8	(Argentina) F Bagnis	6	6
(Bolivia) H Dellien	2	2
(Spain) C Taberner	2	6^{4}
2	(Spain) A Ramos Viñolas	6	7^{7}

Quarterfinals
7	(Argentina) S Báez	7	3	6
(Brazil) T Monteiro	5	6	4
8	(Argentina) F Bagnis	5	2
2	(Spain) A Ramos Viñolas	7	6

Semifinals
7	(Argentina) S Báez	6	4	6
2	(Spain) A Ramos Viñolas	4	6	2

== Qualifying ==
=== Seeds ===
1. (Serbia) Nikola Milojević (qualifying competition)
2. (Argentina) Juan Ignacio Londero (qualified)
3. (Czech Republic) Zdeněk Kolář (first round)
4. (Argentina) Camilo Ugo Carabelli (first round)
5. (Argentina) Renzo Olivo (qualified)
6. (Italy) Alessandro Giannessi (first round)
7. (Argentina) Facundo Mena (first round)
8. (Argentina) Nicolás Kicker (qualifying competition, lucky loser)

=== Qualifiers ===
1. (Brazil) Matheus Pucinelli de Almeida
2. (Argentina) Juan Ignacio Londero
3. (Argentina) Renzo Olivo
4. (Chile) Gonzalo Lama

=== Lucky loser ===
1. (Argentina) Nicolás Kicker

=== Qualifying draw ===
==== First qualifier ====
First round
1	(Serbia) Nikola Milojević	7^{7}	6
(Argentina) Santiago Rodríguez Taverna	6^{5}	3
(Brazil) Matheus Pucinelli de Almeida	6	6
7	(Argentina) Facundo Mena	3	4

Qualifying competition
1	(Serbia) Nikola Milojević	3	7^{7}	4
(Brazil) Matheus Pucinelli de Almeida	6	6^{3}	6

==== Second qualifier ====
First round
2	(Argentina) Juan Ignacio Londero	6	6
(Argentina) Andrea Collarini	2	3
(Brazil) Felipe Meligeni Alves	6	6
6	(Italy) Alessandro Giannessi	2	4

Qualifying competition
2	(Argentina) Juan Ignacio Londero	6	6
(Brazil) Felipe Meligeni Alves	4	4

==== Third qualifier ====
First round
3	(Czech Republic) Zdeněk Kolář	3	2
Alt	(Argentina) Hernán Casanova	6	6
WC	(Chile) Daniel Antonio Núñez	2	4
5	(Argentina) Renzo Olivo	6	6

Qualifying competition
Alt	(Argentina) Hernán Casanova	2	2
5	(Argentina) Renzo Olivo	6	6

==== Fourth qualifier ====
First round
4	(Argentina) Camilo Ugo Carabelli	7^{7}	6^{6}	1
(Chile) Gonzalo Lama	6^{3}	7^{8}	6
WC	(Chile) Benjamín Torres	0	2
8	(Argentina) Nicolás Kicker	6	6

Qualifying competition
(Chile) Gonzalo Lama	6	4	6
8	(Argentina) Nicolás Kicker	2	6	4
