= 2025 Chile Open – Singles =

Singles
- 2025 Chile Open

Final
- Champion: (Serbia) Laslo Djere
- Runner-up: (Argentina) Sebastián Báez
- Score: 6–4, 3–6, 7–5

Details
- Draw: 28 (4 Q / 3 WC )
- Seeds: 8

Events
Singles	Doubles
- Chile Open

Laslo Djere defeated defending champion Sebastián Báez in the final, 6–4, 3–6, 7–5 to win the singles tennis title at the 2025 Chile Open. It was his third ATP Tour singles title and first since 2020.

== Seeds ==
The top four seeds received a bye into the second round.

1. (Argentina) Francisco Cerúndolo (semifinals)
2. (Chile) Alejandro Tabilo (second round)
3. (Argentina) Sebastián Báez (final)
4. (Spain) Pedro Martínez (second round)
5. (Argentina) Tomás Martín Etcheverry (quarterfinals)
6. (Argentina) Mariano Navone (second round)
7. (Chile) Nicolás Jarry (first round)
8. (Italy) Luciano Darderi (first round)

== Draw ==
Key

- Q = Qualifier
- WC = Wild card
- LL = Lucky loser
- Alt = Alternate
- ITF = ITF entry
- PR = Protected ranking
- SR = Special ranking
- SE = Special exempt
- JE = Junior exempt
- JR = Junior Accelerator Programme entrant
- CO = College Accelerator Programme entrant
- NG = Next Gen Accelerator Program entrant
- w/o = Walkover
- r = Retired
- d = Defaulted

=== Finals ===
Semifinals
1	(Argentina) Francisco Cerúndolo	1	6	3
(Serbia) Laslo Djere	6	4	6
3	(Argentina) Sebastián Báez	6	3	6
(Argentina) Camilo Ugo Carabelli	1	6	2

Final
(Serbia) Laslo Djere	6	3	7
3	(Argentina) Sebastián Báez	4	6	5

=== Top half ===
First round
(Germany) Y Hanfmann	7	6
(Argentina) F Díaz Acosta	5	3
WC	(Chile) C Garín	2	6	6
Q	(Argentina) JP Ficovich	6	4	4
(France) H Gaston	2	3
5	(Argentina) TM Etcheverry	6	6
WC	(Peru) I Buse	3	4
(Serbia) L Djere	6	6
Q	(Brazil) G Heide	7	6
(Brazil) T Seyboth Wild	5	2
(Portugal) J Faria	6	6
8	(Italy) L Darderi	3	4

Second round
1	(Argentina) F Cerúndolo	6	4	7^{7}
(Germany) Y Hanfmann	2	6	6^{5}
WC	(Chile) C Garín	2	4
5	(Argentina) TM Etcheverry	6	6
4	(Spain) P Martínez	1	4
(Serbia) L Djere	6	6
Q	(Brazil) G Heide	7^{7}	6^{5}	4
(Portugal) J Faria	6^{2}	7^{7}	6

Quarterfinals
1	(Argentina) F Cerúndolo	4	6	7
5	(Argentina) TM Etcheverry	6	3	5
(Serbia) L Djere	7^{7}	4	6
(Portugal) J Faria	6^{5}	6	4

Semifinals
1	(Argentina) F Cerúndolo	1	6	3
(Serbia) L Djere	6	4	6

=== Bottom half ===
First round
6	(Argentina) M Navone	6	6
(Kazakhstan) A Shevchenko	2	2
(France) C Moutet	2	6	2
(Bosnia and Herzegovina) D Džumhur	6	3	6
Q	(Brazil) F Meligeni Alves	6^{3}	6^{4}
(Argentina) F Comesaña	7^{7}	7^{7}
7	(Chile) N Jarry	7	3	6^{9}
(Argentina) C Ugo Carabelli	5	6	7^{11}
Q	(Argentina) JM Cerúndolo	3	6	6^{2}
(Brazil) T Monteiro	6	3	7^{7}
(Argentina) F Coria	6	6
WC	(Chile) T Barrios Vera	1	0

Second round
6	(Argentina) M Navone	4	6	3
(Bosnia and Herzegovina) D Džumhur	6	3	6
(Argentina) F Comesaña	3	7	6^{5}
3	(Argentina) S Báez	6	5	7^{7}
(Argentina) C Ugo Carabelli	4	7^{7}	6
(Brazil) T Monteiro	6	6^{2}	3
(Argentina) F Coria	7^{13}	4	6
2	(Chile) A Tabilo	6^{11}	6	3

Quarterfinals
(Bosnia and Herzegovina) D Džumhur	4	4
3	(Argentina) S Báez	6	6
(Argentina) C Ugo Carabelli	6	6
(Argentina) F Coria	4	3

Semifinals
3	(Argentina) S Báez	6	3	6
(Argentina) C Ugo Carabelli	1	6	2

== Qualifying ==
=== Seeds ===
1. (Argentina) Juan Manuel Cerúndolo (qualified)
2. (Argentina) Thiago Agustín Tirante (qualifying competition)
3. (Argentina) Román Andrés Burruchaga (qualifying competition)
4. (Brazil) Felipe Meligeni Alves (qualified)
5. (Brazil) Gustavo Heide (qualified)
6. (Argentina) Juan Pablo Ficovich (qualified)
7. (Argentina) Facundo Mena (withdrew)
8. (Peru) Juan Pablo Varillas (qualifying competition)

=== Qualifiers ===
1. (Argentina) Juan Manuel Cerúndolo
2. (Brazil) Gustavo Heide
3. (Argentina) Juan Pablo Ficovich
4. (Brazil) Felipe Meligeni Alves

=== Qualifying draw ===
==== First qualifier ====
First round
1	(Argentina) Juan Manuel Cerúndolo	6	6
(Chile) Matías Soto	3	2
Alt	(United States) Ryan Seggerman	3	6^{5}
Alt	(Brazil) Orlando Luz	6	7^{7}

Qualifying competition
1	(Argentina) Juan Manuel Cerúndolo	6	6
Alt	(Brazil) Orlando Luz	3	2

==== Second qualifier ====
First round
2	(Argentina) Thiago Agustín Tirante	6	6
Alt	(Spain) Pol Martín Tiffon	1	4
Alt	(Argentina) Genaro Alberto Olivieri	2	2
5	(Brazil) Gustavo Heide	6	6

Qualifying competition
2	(Argentina) Thiago Agustín Tirante	7^{7}	2	5
5	(Brazil) Gustavo Heide	6^{4}	6	7

==== Third qualifier ====
First round
3	(Argentina) Román Andrés Burruchaga	6	5	6
WC	(Switzerland) Kilian Feldbausch	2	7	4
(Paraguay) Daniel Vallejo	2	3
6	(Argentina) Juan Pablo Ficovich	6	6

Qualifying competition
3	(Argentina) Román Andrés Burruchaga	4	7^{7}	2
6	(Argentina) Juan Pablo Ficovich	6	6^{3}	6

==== Fourth qualifier ====
First round
4	(Brazil) Felipe Meligeni Alves	7	6
WC	(Chile) Bastián Malla	5	2
(United States) Emilio Nava	3	4
8	(Peru) Juan Pablo Varillas	6	6

Qualifying competition
4	(Brazil) Felipe Meligeni Alves	6	6
8	(Peru) Juan Pablo Varillas	4	2
