= Juan Ignacio Cerda =

Chilean tennis player

- Country (sports): Chile
- Born: 25 September 1978 (age 46)
- Plays: Right-handed
- Prize money: $20,393

Singles
- Highest ranking: No. 620 (1 Nov 2004)

Doubles
- Career record: 2–3
- Highest ranking: No. 185 (7 Mar 2005)

Juan Ignacio Cerda (born 25 September 1978) is a Chilean former professional tennis player.

Following a collegiate career for the University of San Diego, Cerda competed on the professional tour and reached a best singles ranking of 620 in the world. His best performances were in doubles, peaking at 185 in the rankings. He was a doubles semi-finalist at an ATP Tour tournament in Viña del Mar in 2005 and won seven ITF Futures titles.

== ITF Futures titles ==
=== Doubles: (7) ===
No.	Date	Tournament	Surface	Partner	Opponents	Score
1.	Apr 2003	Chile F2, Viña del Mar	Clay	(Chile) Phillip Harboe	(Uruguay) Marcel Felder (Argentina) Matias O'Neille	6–2, 6–7^{(4)}, 6–4
2.	Sep 2003	Jamaica F8, Montego Bay	Hard	(Sweden) Jacob Adaktusson	(United States) Andrew Carlson (United States) Trevor Spracklin	6–4, 6–3
3,	Oct 2003	Chile F6, Santiago	Clay	(Chile) Phillip Harboe	(Chile) Paul Capdeville (Argentina) Juan-Felipe Yanez	7–5, 2–6, 6–3
4.	Mar 2004	Portugal F2, Albufeira	Hard	(Netherlands) Jasper Smit	(Portugal) Fred Gil (Portugal) Leonardo Tavares	6–4, 6–4
5.	Jun 2004	Mexico F7, Monterrey	Hard	(Brazil) Rodrigo-Antonio Grilli	(Canada) Matt Klinger (Australia) Chris Letcher	6–7^{(6)}, 6–3, 6–4
6.	Nov 2004	Iran F3, Kish Island	Clay	(Netherlands) Jasper Smit	(Italy) Manuel Jorquera (Algeria) Lamine Ouahab	w/o
7.	Nov 2004	Iran F4, Kish Island	Clay	(Netherlands) Jasper Smit	(Germany) Benedikt Dorsch (Austria) Marko Neunteibl	7–6^{(3)}, 4–6, 6–3
