= 2021 Chile Open – Doubles =

Doubles
- 2021 Chile Open

Final
- Champions: (Italy) Simone Bolelli (Argentina) Máximo González
- Runners-up: (Argentina) Federico Delbonis (Spain) Jaume Munar
- Score: 7–6^{(7–4)}, 6–4

Events
| Singles | Doubles |
- Chile Open

Roberto Carballés Baena and Alejandro Davidovich Fokina were the defending champions, but Davidovich Fokina chose to participate in Marseille instead. Carballés Baena partnered Federico Coria but lost in the first round to Raven Klaasen and Ben McLachlan.

Simone Bolelli and Máximo González won the title, defeating Federico Delbonis and Jaume Munar in the final, 7–6^{(7–4)}, 6–4.

== Seeds ==
1. (South Africa) Raven Klaasen / (Japan) Ben McLachlan (semifinals)
2. (United States) Austin Krajicek / (Croatia) Franko Škugor (first round)
3. (Brazil) Marcelo Demoliner / (Mexico) Santiago González (quarterfinals)
4. (Italy) Simone Bolelli / (Argentina) Máximo González (champions)

== Draw ==
Key

- Q = Qualifier
- WC = Wild card
- LL = Lucky loser
- Alt = Alternate
- ITF = ITF entry
- PR = Protected ranking
- SR = Special ranking
- SE = Special exempt
- JE = Junior exempt
- JR = Junior Accelerator Programme entrant
- CO = College Accelerator Programme entrant
- NG = Next Gen Accelerator Program entrant
- w/o = Walkover
- r = Retired
- d = Defaulted

=== Draw ===
First round
1 | (South Africa) R Klaasen (Japan) B McLachlan | 6 | 6
(Spain) R Carballés Baena (Argentina) F Coria | 3 | 2
(Argentina) G Durán (Argentina) A Molteni | 6 | 3 | [8]
WC | (Chile) N Jarry (Argentina) L Mayer | 3 | 6 | [10]
4 | (Italy) S Bolelli (Argentina) M González | 7^{9} | 6
(Bosnia and Herzegovina) T Brkić (Serbia) N Ćaćić | 6^{7} | 3
(Monaco) R Arneodo (France) B Paire | 6 | 6
(United States) N Monroe (New Zealand) A Sitak | 4 | 3
(Argentina) F Delbonis (Spain) J Munar | 6 | 6
(Portugal) J Sousa (Portugal) P Sousa | 3 | 4
(Uruguay) A Behar (Ecuador) G Escobar | 3 | 4
3 | (Brazil) M Demoliner (Mexico) S González | 6 | 6
(Austria) O Marach (Venezuela) LD Martínez | 6^{4} | 1
(Sweden) A Göransson (Portugal) G Oliveira | 7^{7} | 6
WC | (Chile) MT Barrios Vera (Chile) A Tabilo | 6 | 6
2 | (United States) A Krajicek (Croatia) F Škugor | 3 | 4

Quarterfinals
1 | (South Africa) R Klaasen (Japan) B McLachlan | 2 | 7 | [10]
WC | (Chile) N Jarry (Argentina) L Mayer | 6 | 5 | [8]
4 | (Italy) S Bolelli (Argentina) M González | 6 | 7^{7}
(Monaco) R Arneodo (France) B Paire | 2 | 6^{3}
(Argentina) F Delbonis (Spain) J Munar | 7^{7} | 7^{7}
3 | (Brazil) M Demoliner (Mexico) S González | 6^{4} | 6^{4}
(Sweden) A Göransson (Portugal) G Oliveira | 6 | 4 | [10]
WC | (Chile) MT Barrios Vera (Chile) A Tabilo | 4 | 6 | [7]

Semifinals
1 | (South Africa) R Klaasen (Japan) B McLachlan | 4 | 4
4 | (Italy) S Bolelli (Argentina) M González | 6 | 6
(Argentina) F Delbonis (Spain) J Munar | 7 | 6
(Sweden) A Göransson (Portugal) G Oliveira | 5 | 4

Final
4 | (Italy) S Bolelli (Argentina) M González | 7^{7} | 6
(Argentina) F Delbonis (Spain) J Munar | 6^{4} | 4
