= 2026 Chile Open =

- Date: 23 February – 1 March
- Edition: 28th
- Category: ATP Tour 250 series
- Draw: 28S / 16D
- Surface: Clay / outdoor
- Location: Santiago, Chile
- Venue: Estadio San Carlos de Apoquindo

Champions

Singles
- (Italy) Luciano Darderi

Doubles
- (Brazil) Orlando Luz / (Brazil) Rafael Matos
- Chile Open

The 2026 Chile Open (known as the BCI Seguros Chile Open for sponsorship reasons) was a men's tennis tournament played on outdoor clay courts. It was the 27th edition of the Chile Open, and part of the ATP 250 tournaments on the 2026 ATP Tour. It took place in Santiago, Chile from 23 February through 1 March 2026.

== Champions ==
=== Singles ===
- (Italy) Luciano Darderi def. (Germany) Yannick Hanfmann, 7–6^{(8–6)}, 7–5

=== Doubles ===
- (Brazil) Orlando Luz / (Brazil) Rafael Matos def. (Uruguay) Ariel Behar / (Australia) Matthew Romios, 6–4, 6–3

== Singles main draw entrants ==
=== Seeds ===
Country	Player	Rank^{1}	Seed
ARG	Francisco Cerúndolo	19	1
ITA	Luciano Darderi	21	2
ARG	Sebastián Báez	32	3
ARG	Camilo Ugo Carabelli	46	4
~~ARG~~	~~Tomás Martín Etcheverry~~	~~51~~	~~5~~
ITA	Matteo Berrettini	57	6
ARG	Francisco Comesaña	63	7
CHI	Alejandro Tabilo	68	8

- Rankings are as of 9 February 2026.

=== Other entrants ===
The following players received wildcards into the singles main draw:

- (Chile) Nicolás Jarry
- (Italy) Francesco Passaro
- (Chile) Matías Soto

The following players received entry from the qualifying draw:

- (Argentina) Alex Barrena
- (Italy) Andrea Pellegrino
- (Croatia) Dino Prižmić
- (Paraguay) Daniel Vallejo

The following player received entry as a lucky loser:

- (Lithuania) Vilius Gaubas

=== Withdrawals ===
- (Serbia) Laslo Djere → replaced by (Argentina) Thiago Agustín Tirante
- (Argentina) Tomás Martín Etcheverry → replaced by (Lithuania) Vilius Gaubas (LL)
- (France) Alexandre Müller → replaced by (Germany) Yannick Hanfmann
- (Italy) Lorenzo Sonego → replaced by (Czech Republic) Vít Kopřiva
- (Spain) Carlos Taberner → replaced by (Argentina) Román Andrés Burruchaga

== Doubles main draw entrants ==
=== Seeds ===
Country	Player	Country	Player	Rank^{1}	Seed
ARG	Máximo González	ARG	Andrés Molteni	55	1
BRA	Orlando Luz	BRA	Rafael Matos	75	2
BRA	Marcelo Demoliner	BRA	Fernando Romboli	126	3
BEL	Sander Gillé	NED	Sem Verbeek	127	4

- Rankings are as of 16 February 2026.

=== Other entrants ===
The following pairs received wildcards into the doubles main draw:

- ~~(Chile) Tomás Barrios Vera / (Peru) Ignacio Buse~~
- (Chile) Nicolás Jarry / (Chile) Diego Jarry Fillol

The following pairs received entry into the doubles main draw as alternates:

- (Portugal) Jaime Faria / (Portugal) Henrique Rocha
- (Colombia) Daniel Elahi Galán / (Denmark) Elmer Møller
- (Germany) Jakob Schnaitter / (Germany) Mark Wallner
- (Chile) Matías Soto / (Bolivia) Federico Zeballos

=== Withdrawals ===
- (Chile) Tomás Barrios Vera / (Peru) Ignacio Buse → replaced by (Portugal) Jaime Faria / (Portugal) Henrique Rocha
- (Argentina) Román Andrés Burruchaga / (Argentina) Thiago Agustín Tirante → replaced by (Chile) Matías Soto / (Bolivia) Federico Zeballos
- (Italy) Luciano Darderi / (Chile) Alejandro Tabilo → replaced by (Germany) Jakob Schnaitter / (Germany) Mark Wallner
- (Germany) Yannick Hanfmann / (Czech Republic) Vít Kopřiva → replaced by (Colombia) Daniel Elahi Galán / (Denmark) Elmer Møller
