= 2025 Chile Open – Doubles =

Doubles
- 2025 Chile Open

Final
- Champions: (Colombia) Nicolás Barrientos (India) Rithvik Choudary Bollipalli
- Runners-up: (Argentina) Máximo González (Argentina) Andrés Molteni
- Score: 6–3, 6–2

Events
Singles	Doubles
- Chile Open

Nicolás Barrientos and Rithvik Choudary Bollipalli defeated Máximo González and Andrés Molteni in the final, 6–3, 6–2 to win the doubles title at the 2025 Chile Open. It was the second ATP Tour doubles title for both players.

Tomás Barrios Vera and Alejandro Tabilo were the reigning champions, but Tabilo did not participate this year. Barrios Vera partnered Ignacio Buse, but lost to González and Molteni in the quarterfinals.

== Seeds ==
1. (Argentina) Máximo González / (Argentina) Andrés Molteni (final)
2. (Brazil) Rafael Matos / (Brazil) Marcelo Melo (withdrew)
3. (Argentina) Guido Andreozzi / (France) Théo Arribagé (semifinals)
4. (Portugal) Francisco Cabral / (Netherlands) Jean-Julien Rojer (quarterfinals)

== Draw ==
Key

- Q = Qualifier
- WC = Wild card
- LL = Lucky loser
- Alt = Alternate
- ITF = ITF entry
- PR = Protected ranking
- SR = Special ranking
- SE = Special exempt
- JE = Junior exempt
- JR = Junior Accelerator Programme entrant
- CO = College Accelerator Programme entrant
- NG = Next Gen Accelerator Program entrant
- w/o = Walkover
- r = Retired
- d = Defaulted

=== Draw ===
First round
1	(Argentina) M González (Argentina) A Molteni	7^{13}	7^{12}
(Germany) J Schnaitter (Germany) M Wallner	6^{11}	6^{10}
WC	(Chile) T Barrios Vera (Peru) I Buse	7	7^{7}
(Spain) Í Cervantes (Spain) P Martínez	5	6^{4}
4	(Portugal) F Cabral (Netherlands) J-J Rojer	7	6^{9}	[10]
WC	(Brazil) F Romboli (Chile) M Soto	5	7^{11}	[8]
(United States) R Seggerman (Australia) J-P Smith	6	6
(Ecuador) G Escobar (Ecuador) D Hidalgo	2	4
(Portugal) J Faria (Kazakhstan) A Shevchenko	3	6	[3]
(France) G Jacq (Brazil) O Luz	6	3	[10]
(Italy) L Darderi (Argentina) TM Etcheverry	6^{6}	6	[6]
3	(Argentina) G Andreozzi (France) T Arribagé	7^{8}	4	[10]
(Colombia) N Barrientos (India) RC Bollipalli	7^{7}	7^{9}
(Poland) K Drzewiecki (Poland) P Matuszewski	6^{5}	6^{7}
(Brazil) M Demoliner (Brazil) M Zormann	7^{10}	7^{7}
Alt	(Argentina) RA Burruchaga (Argentina) TA Tirante	6^{8}	6^{2}

Quarterfinals
1	(Argentina) M González (Argentina) A Molteni	2	6	[10]
WC	(Chile) T Barrios Vera (Peru) I Buse	6	4	[5]
4	(Portugal) F Cabral (Netherlands) J-J Rojer	6^{3}	6^{5}
(United States) R Seggerman (Australia) J-P Smith	7^{7}	7^{7}
(France) G Jacq (Brazil) O Luz	6^{2}	3
3	(Argentina) G Andreozzi (France) T Arribagé	7^{7}	6
(Colombia) N Barrientos (India) RC Bollipalli	3	7^{7}	[10]
(Brazil) M Demoliner (Brazil) M Zormann	6	6^{2}	[8]

Semifinals
1	(Argentina) M González (Argentina) A Molteni	6	6
(United States) R Seggerman (Australia) J-P Smith	4	3
3	(Argentina) G Andreozzi (France) T Arribagé	6	6^{7}	[5]
(Colombia) N Barrientos (India) RC Bollipalli	4	7^{9}	[10]

Final
1	(Argentina) M González (Argentina) A Molteni	3	2
(Colombia) N Barrientos (India) RC Bollipalli	6	6
