= 2005 Movistar Open =

- Date: 31 January – 6 February
- Edition: 12th
- Category: International Series
- Draw: 32S / 16D
- Prize money: $355,000
- Surface: Clay / outdoor
- Location: Viña del Mar, Chile

Champions

Singles
- (Argentina) Gastón Gaudio

Doubles
- (Spain) David Ferrer / (Spain) Santiago Ventura
← 2004 ·	Chile Open	· 2006 →

The 2005 Movistar Open was an ATP men's tennis tournament held on outdoor clay courts in Viña del Mar, Chile that was part of the International Series of the 2005 ATP Tour. It was the 12th edition of the tournament and was held from 31 January to 6 February 2005. First-seeded Gastón Gaudio won the singles title.

== Finals ==
=== Singles ===
(Argentina) Gastón Gaudio defeated (Chile) Fernando González 6–3, 6–4

- It was Gaudio's 1st title of the year and the 6th of his career.

=== Doubles ===
(Spain) David Ferrer / (Spain) Santiago Ventura defeated (Argentina) Gastón Etlis / (Argentina) Martín Rodríguez 6–3, 6–4

- It was Ferrer's 1st title of the year and the 2nd of his career. It was Ventura's 1st title of the year and the 2nd of his career.
