= Phillip Harboe =

Chilean tennis player

- Country (sports): Chile
- Born: 20 July 1982 (age 42)
- Plays: Right-handed
- Prize money: $45,737

Singles
- Career record: 0–1 (ATP Tour)
- Highest ranking: No. 312 (19 May 2003)

Doubles
- Career record: 0–3 (ATP Tour)
- Highest ranking: No. 382 (9 June 2003)

Phillip Harboe (born 20 July 1982) is a Chilean former professional tennis player.

Harboe had a career high singles ranking of 312, with his only ATP Tour main draw appearance coming at the 2005 Chile Open. Following qualifying wins over Iván Navarro, Juan Pablo Brzezicki and Jan Frode Andersen, Harboe lost his first round match in three sets to Santiago Ventura. He featured in three further Chile Open main draws in doubles.

== ITF Futures titles ==
=== Singles: (1) ===
No.	Date	Tournament	Surface	Opponent	Score
1.	Oct 2003	Chile F6, Santiago	Clay	(Argentina) Edgardo Massa	7–5, 7–5

=== Doubles: (3) ===
No.	Date	Tournament	Surface	Partner	Opponents	Score
1.	Sep 2002	Mexico F14, Mazatlán	Hard	(Chile) Hermes Gamonal	(Cuba) Sandor Martínez (Cuba) Lázaro Navarro	6–4, 7–6^{(5)}
2.	Apr 2003	Chile F2, Viña del Mar	Clay	(Chile) Juan Ignacio Cerda	(Uruguay) Marcel Felder (Argentina) Matias O'Neille	6–2, 6–7^{(4)}, 6–4
3.	Oct 2003	Chile F6, Santiago	Clay	(Chile) Juan Ignacio Cerda	(Chile) Paul Capdeville (Argentina) Juan-Felipe Yanez	7–5, 2–6, 6–3
