= Chile Open (tennis) =

Tennis tournament in Santiago, Chile

Coordinates: 32.993°S 71.545°W

ATP Tour
- Event name: Chile International Championships (1930-69, 78); Chile International Open Championships (1970-73); Chile International Open (1974-75); Chilean International Open (1976-81)
- Founded: 1930; 96 years ago
- Location: Santiago de Chile (1930–1981; 1993–2000; 2011; 2020–current); Viña del Mar (1981–1983; 2001–2009; 2012–2014); Colina (2010) Chile
- Venue: Club Deportivo Universidad Católica (2020–current)
- Category: ILTF South America Circuit (1930–1972); ILTF independent (1973–1975); Grand Prix (1976–1983); ATP World Series (1993–1998); ATP International Series (2000–2008); ATP World Tour 250 series (2009–2014); ATP Tour 250 (2020–current)
- Surface: Clay / outdoor
- Draw: 28S/32Q/16D
- Prize money: US$700,045 (2026)
- Website: chileopen.cl

Current champions (2026)
- Singles: (Italy) Luciano Darderi
- Doubles: (Brazil) Orlando Luz (Brazil) Rafael Matos

The BCI Seguros Chile Open (sponsored by BCI Seguros) is a professional men's tennis tournament played on outdoor red clay courts in Santiago, Chile. It is currently part of the ATP 250 tour-level events and part of the four-tournament Golden Swing.

The tournament was originally founded in 1930 as the Chile International Championships, a combined men's and women's tennis event. In its history it was held alternately in Viña del Mar city and in 2010, Colina.

== History ==
In the pre-open era, the Chile International Championships (sometimes called the Chilean Nationals, but always open to international competitors) was part of a South American tournament circuit towards the end of the year.

From 1976 until 1981 this event was known as the Chilean International Open and was an ILTF Grand Prix Circuit affiliated men's tennis tournament. In 1992, Brazil suspended its three ATP tournaments. When the ATP resolved to keep these tournaments in Latin America, brothers Jaime and Álvaro Fillol decided to buy the organizing rights to hold one of these events in Chile. The first edition was held in Santiago in November 1993. In 1999, it was not held, due to the ATP's decision to reschedule the event to February 2000. In 2001, the tournament was moved to Viña del Mar. The event moved back to Santiago in 2010, eventually returning to Viña del Mar in 2012.

For the 2007 edition, the tournament switched to a 24-player round robin format. After problems with this format were discovered in other tournaments, the ATP decided to revert all round-robin events to the old play-off format. Thus, from the year 2008, the tournament was back to its old 32-player draw scheme.

After many sponsorship renewing attempts, the tournament was folded mid-year after the 2014 edition and the tournament moved to Ecuador.

On 15 October 2019, Brasil Open organisers announced the date the tournament will return to Santiago for Chile Open comeback in 2020. On 19 November 2019, despite Chilean protests, ATP confirmed the event once again.

== Finals ==
=== Men's singles ===
(incomplete roll)

Year	Champions	Runners-up	Score
Santiago (1930–1981)
1935	(Argentina) Adriano Zappa	(Argentina) Lucilo del Castillo	2–6, 6–2, 8–6, 6–1
1939	(Ecuador) Pancho Segura	(Argentina) Heraldo Weiss	8–6, 6–3, 6–1
1940	(Ecuador) Pancho Segura	(Chile) Salvador Deik	4–6, 6–4, 6–0
1950	(Chile) Ricardo Balbiers	(United States) Tony Vincent	7–5, 6–3
1951	(United States) Budge Patty	(Peru) Jorge Morales	6–1, 6–4, 6–2
1952	(Egypt) Jaroslav Drobný	(United States) Bernard Bartzen	4–6, 6–4, 6–8, 6–2, 6–2
1953	(Egypt) Jaroslav Drobný	(Argentina) Enrique Morea	3–6, 6–3, 6–4, 6–3
1955	(Chile) Luis Ayala	(Sweden) Sven Davidson	6–4, 3–6, 7–5, 6–4
1956	(Chile) Luis Ayala	(Australia) Mervyn Rose	6–2, 6–4, 3–6, 4–6, 9–7
1957	(Chile) Luis Ayala	(United Kingdom) Mike Davies	6–4, 6–4, 6–1
1958	(Chile) Luis Ayala	(United Kingdom) Billy Knight	6–1, 6–3, 6–4
1959	(Chile) Luis Ayala	(Spain) Manuel Santana	7–5, 6–1, 4–6, 6–4
1960	(Chile) Luis Ayala	(Brazil) Ronald Barnes	6–3, 7–5, 6–1
1961	(France) Pierre Darmon	(United States) Whitney Reed	6–2, 6–1, 6–4
1962	(West Germany) Dieter Ecklebe	(Venezuela) Isaías Pimentel	7–5, 6–0, 6–4
1963	(Australia) Alan Lane	(Italy) Nicola Pietrangeli	4–6, 6–4, 6–4
1964	(Chile) Patricio Rodríguez	(Argentina) Roberto Aubone	6–0, 4–6, 6–2, 8–6
1966	(Chile) Patricio Rodríguez	(Chile) Jaime Pinto Bravo	6–4, 3–6, 6–2, 6–4
1967	(Chile) Patricio Cornejo	(Chile) Patricio Rodríguez	3–6, 6–4, 6–4, 6–4
↓ Open era ↓
1968	(Chile) Patricio Cornejo	(Czechoslovakia) Jan Kodeš	8–10, 6–1, 6–4, 6–1
1969	(Czechoslovakia) Jan Kodeš	(Czechoslovakia) Milan Holeček	4–6, 6–3, 1–6, 6–1, 6–1
1970	(Spain) Manuel Orantes	(United States) Frank Froehling III	6–3, 6–2, 6–4
1971	(Chile) Jaime Pinto Bravo	(Chile) Jaime Fillol Sr.	6–4, 6–4, 6–7, 6–4
1973	(United States) Dick Stockton	(Chile) Patricio Cornejo	6–2, 7–5
1976	(Spain) José Higueras	(Brazil) Carlos Kirmayr	5–7, 6–4, 6–4
1977	(Argentina) Guillermo Vilas	(Chile) Jaime Fillol	6–0, 2–6, 6–4
1978	(Argentina) José Luis Clerc	(Paraguay) Víctor Pecci	3–6, 6–3, 6–1
1979	(Chile) Hans Gildemeister	(Spain) José Higueras	7–5, 5–7, 6–4
1980	(Paraguay) Víctor Pecci	(France) Christophe Freyss	4–6, 6–4, 6–3
1981	(Chile) Hans Gildemeister	(Ecuador) Andrés Gómez	6–4, 7–5
Viña del Mar (1981–1983)
1981	(Paraguay) Víctor Pecci	(Spain) José Higueras	6–4, 6–0
1982	(Chile) Pedro Rebolledo	(Mexico) Raúl Ramírez	6–4, 3–6, 7–6
1983	(Paraguay) Víctor Pecci	(Chile) Jaime Fillol	2–6, 7–5, 6–4
Santiago (1993–2000)
1993	(Argentina) Javier Frana	(Spain) Emilio Sánchez Vicario	7–5, 3–6, 6–3
1994	(Spain) Alberto Berasategui	(Spain) Francisco Clavet	6–3, 6–4
1995	(Czech Republic) Sláva Doseděl	(Chile) Marcelo Ríos	7–6^{(7–3)}, 6–3
1996	(Argentina) Hernán Gumy	(Chile) Marcelo Ríos	6–4, 7–5
1997	(Spain) Julián Alonso	(Chile) Marcelo Ríos	6–2, 6–1
1998	(Spain) Francisco Clavet	(Morocco) Younes El Aynaoui	6–2, 6–4
2000	(Brazil) Gustavo Kuerten	(Argentina) Mariano Puerta	7–6^{(7–3)}, 6–3
Viña del Mar (2001–2009)
2001	(Argentina) Guillermo Coria	(Argentina) Gastón Gaudio	4–6, 6–2, 7–5
2002	(Chile) Fernando González	(Ecuador) Nicolás Lapentti	6–3, 6–7^{(5–7)}, 7–6^{(7–4)}
2003	(Spain) David Sánchez Muñoz	(Chile) Marcelo Ríos	1–6, 6–3, 6–3
2004	(Chile) Fernando González	(Brazil) Gustavo Kuerten	6–4, 6–4
2005	(Argentina) Gastón Gaudio	(Chile) Fernando González	6–3, 6–4
2006	(Argentina) José Acasuso	(Chile) Nicolás Massú	6–4, 6–3
2007	(Peru) Luis Horna	(Chile) Nicolás Massú	7–5, 6–3
2008	(Chile) Fernando González	(Argentina) Juan Mónaco	w/o
2009	(Chile) Fernando González	(Argentina) José Acasuso	6–1, 6–3
Santiago (2010–2011)
2010	(Brazil) Thomaz Bellucci	(Argentina) Juan Mónaco	6–2, 0–6, 6–4
2011	(Spain) Tommy Robredo	(Colombia) Santiago Giraldo	6–2, 2–6, 7–6^{(7–5)}
Viña del Mar (2012–2014)
2012	(Argentina) Juan Mónaco	(Argentina) Carlos Berlocq	6–3, 6–7, 6–1
2013	(Argentina) Horacio Zeballos	(Spain) Rafael Nadal	6–7^{(2–7)}, 7–6^{(8–6)}, 6–4
2014	(Italy) Fabio Fognini	(Argentina) Leonardo Mayer	6–2, 6–4
Santiago (2020–present)
2020	(Brazil) Thiago Seyboth Wild	(Norway) Casper Ruud	7–5, 4–6, 6–3
2021	(Chile) Cristian Garín	(Argentina) Facundo Bagnis	6–4, 6–7^{(3–7)}, 7–5
2022	(Spain) Pedro Martínez	(Argentina) Sebastián Báez	4–6, 6–4, 6–4
2023	(Chile) Nicolás Jarry	(Argentina) Tomás Martín Etcheverry	6–7^{(5–7)}, 7–6^{(7–5)}, 6–2
2024	(Argentina) Sebastián Báez	(Chile) Alejandro Tabilo	3–6, 6–0, 6–4
2025	(Serbia) Laslo Djere	(Argentina) Sebastián Báez	6–4, 3–6, 7–5
2026	(Italy) Luciano Darderi	(Germany) Yannick Hanfmann	7–6^{(8–6)}, 7–5

=== Doubles ===
Year	Champions	Runners-up	Score
Santiago (1976–1981)
1976	(Chile) Patricio Cornejo (Chile) Hans Gildemeister	(Argentina) Lito Álvarez (Chile) Belus Prajoux	6–3, 7–6
1977	(Chile) Patricio Cornejo (Chile) Jaime Fillol	(United States) Henry Bunis (Australia) Paul McNamee	5–7, 6–1, 6–1
1978	(Chile) Hans Gildemeister (Paraguay) Víctor Pecci	(Chile) Álvaro Fillol (Chile) Jaime Fillol	6–4, 6–3
1979	(Spain) José Higueras / (Colombia) Jairo Velasco vs. (Chile) Álvaro Fillol / (Chile) Jaime Fillol		Suspended
1980	(Chile) Belus Prajoux (Ecuador) Ricardo Ycaza	(Brazil) Carlos Kirmayr (Brazil) João Soares	4–6, 7–6, 6–4
1981	(Chile) Hans Gildemeister (Ecuador) Andrés Gómez	(Argentina) Ricardo Cano (Chile) Belus Prajoux	6–2, 7–6
Viña del Mar (1981–1983)
1981	(Australia) David Carter (Australia) Paul Kronk	(Ecuador) Andrés Gómez (Chile) Belus Prajoux	6–1, 6–2
1982	(Spain) Manuel Orantes (Mexico) Raúl Ramírez	(Argentina) Guillermo Aubone (Spain) Ángel Giménez	Default
1983	(Chile) Hans Gildemeister (Chile) Belus Prajoux	(Brazil) Júlio Góes (Brazil) Ney Keller	6–3, 6–1
Santiago (1993–2000)
1993	(United States) Mike Bauer (Czech Republic) David Rikl	(Sweden) Christer Allgardh (United States) Brian Devening	7–6, 6–4
1994	(Czech Republic) Karel Nováček (Sweden) Mats Wilander	(Spain) Tomás Carbonell (Spain) Francisco Roig	4–6, 7–6, 7–6
1995	(Czech Republic) Jiří Novák (Czech Republic) David Rikl	(United States) Shelby Cannon (United States) Francisco Montana	6–4, 4–6, 6–1
1996	(Brazil) Gustavo Kuerten (Brazil) Fernando Meligeni	(Spain) Albert Portas (Romania) Dinu Pescariu	6–4, 6–2
1997	(Netherlands) Jan Hendrik Davids (Australia) Andrew Kratzmann	(Spain) Julián Alonso (Ecuador) Nicolás Lapentti	7–6, 5–7, 6–4
1998	(Argentina) Mariano Hood (Argentina) Sebastián Prieto	(Italy) Massimo Bertolini (United States) Devin Bowen	7–6, 6–7, 7–6
2000	(Brazil) Gustavo Kuerten (Brazil) Antônio Prieto	(South Africa) Lan Bale (South Africa) Piet Norval	6–2, 6–4
Viña del Mar (2001–2009)
2001	(Argentina) Lucas Arnold (Spain) Tomás Carbonell	(Argentina) Mariano Hood (Argentina) Sebastián Prieto	6–4, 2–6, 6–3
2002	(Argentina) Gastón Etlis (Argentina) Martín Rodríguez	(Argentina) Lucas Arnold (Argentina) Luis Lobo	6–3, 6–4
2003	(Argentina) Agustín Calleri (Argentina) Mariano Hood	(Czech Republic) František Čermák (Czech Republic) Leoš Friedl	6–3, 1–6, 6–4
2004	(Argentina) Juan Ignacio Chela (Argentina) Gastón Gaudio	(Ecuador) Nicolás Lapentti (Argentina) Martín Rodríguez	7–6^{(7–2)}, 7–6^{(7–3)}
2005	(Spain) David Ferrer (Spain) Santiago Ventura	(Argentina) Gastón Etlis (Argentina) Martín Rodríguez	6–3, 6–4
2006	(Argentina) José Acasuso (Argentina) Sebastián Prieto	(Czech Republic) František Čermák (Czech Republic) Leoš Friedl	7–6^{(7–2)}, 6–4
2007	(Chile) Paul Capdeville (Spain) Óscar Hernández	(Spain) Albert Montañés (Spain) Rubén Ramírez Hidalgo	4–6, 6–4, [10–6]
2008	(Argentina) José Acasuso (Argentina) Sebastián Prieto	(Argentina) Máximo González (Argentina) Juan Mónaco	6–1, 3–0, ret.
2009	(Uruguay) Pablo Cuevas (Argentina) Brian Dabul	(Czech Republic) František Čermák (Slovakia) Michal Mertiňák	6–3, 6–3
Santiago (2010–2011)
2010	(Poland) Łukasz Kubot (Austria) Oliver Marach	(Italy) Potito Starace (Argentina) Horacio Zeballos	6–4, 6–0
2011	(Brazil) Marcelo Melo (Brazil) Bruno Soares	(Poland) Łukasz Kubot (Austria) Oliver Marach	6–3, 7–6^{(7–3)}
Viña del Mar (2012–2014)
2012	(Portugal) Frederico Gil (Spain) Daniel Gimeno	(Spain) Pablo Andújar (Argentina) Carlos Berlocq	1–6, 7–5, [12–10]
2013	(Italy) Paolo Lorenzi (Italy) Potito Starace	(Spain) Rafael Nadal (Argentina) Juan Mónaco	6–2, 6–4
2014	(Austria) Oliver Marach (Romania) Florin Mergea	(Colombia) Juan Sebastián Cabal (Colombia) Robert Farah	6–3, 6–4
Santiago (2020–present)
2020	(Spain) Roberto Carballés (Spain) Alejandro Davidovich	(El Salvador) Marcelo Arévalo (United Kingdom) Jonny O'Mara	7–6^{(7–3)}, 6–1
2021	(Italy) Simone Bolelli (Argentina) Máximo González	(Argentina) Federico Delbonis (Spain) Jaume Munar	7–6^{(7–4)}, 6–4
2022	(Brazil) Rafael Matos (Brazil) Felipe Meligeni Alves	(Sweden) André Göransson (United States) Nathaniel Lammons	7–6^{(10–8)}, 7–6^{(7–3)}
2023	(Italy) Andrea Pellegrino (Italy) Andrea Vavassori	(Brazil) Thiago Seyboth Wild (Chile) Matías Soto	6–4, 3–6, [12–10]
2024	(Chile) Alejandro Tabilo (Chile) Tomás Barrios Vera	(Chile) Matías Soto (Brazil) Orlando Luz	6–2, 6–4
2025	(Colombia) Nicolás Barrientos (India) Rithvik Choudary Bollipalli	(Argentina) Máximo González (Argentina) Andrés Molteni	6–3, 6–2
2026	(Brazil) Orlando Luz (Brazil) Rafael Matos	(Uruguay) Ariel Behar (Australia) Matthew Romios	6–4, 6–3

== See also ==
- Golden Swing
- List of tennis tournaments
- Category:National and multi-national tennis tournaments
