= 2005 Stuttgart Open – Singles =

Singles
- 2005 Mercedes Cup

Final
- Champion: (Spain) Rafael Nadal
- Runner-up: (Argentina) Gastón Gaudio
- Score: 6–3, 6–3, 6–4

Details
- Draw: 48
- Seeds: 16

Events
Singles	Doubles
- Stuttgart Open

First-seeded Rafael Nadal defeated Gastón Gaudio in the final, 6–3, 6–3, 6–4 to win the singles tennis title at the 2005 Stuttgart Open.

Guillermo Cañas was the reigning champion, but did not participate this year.

== Seeds ==
1. (Spain) Rafael Nadal (champion)
2. (Russia) Nikolay Davydenko (semifinals, retired due to sickness)
3. (Argentina) Gastón Gaudio (final)
4. (Spain) Tommy Robredo (third round)
5. (Spain) David Ferrer (second round)
6. (Czech Republic) Jiří Novák (third round)
7. (Russia) Mikhail Youzhny (second round)
8. (Italy) Filippo Volandri (second round)
9. (Belgium) Olivier Rochus (second round)
10. (Austria) Jürgen Melzer (second round)
11. (Czech Republic) Tomáš Berdych (quarterfinals)
12. (Romania) Andrei Pavel (second round)
13. (Argentina) José Acasuso (second round)
14. (Russia) Igor Andreev (second round)
15. (Spain) Alberto Martín (second round)
16. (France) Paul-Henri Mathieu (third round)

== Draws ==
=== Key ===
- Q - Qualifier
- WC - Wild Card
- r - Retired
- LL - Lucky loser
- w/o - Walkover

=== Finals ===
Quarterfinals
1	(Spain) Rafael Nadal	6	6
(Czech Republic) Tomáš Zíb	2	1
(Italy) Andreas Seppi	2	3
(Finland) Jarkko Nieminen	6	6
(Argentina) Mariano Zabaleta	4	6	2
3	(Argentina) Gastón Gaudio	6	1	6
11	(Czech Republic) Tomáš Berdych	4	2
2	(Russia) Nikolay Davydenko	6	6

Semifinals
1	(Spain) Rafael Nadal	6	7
(Finland) Jarkko Nieminen	2	5
3	(Argentina) Gastón Gaudio	6	2
2	(Russia) Nikolay Davydenko	3	1^{r}

Final
1	(Spain) Rafael Nadal	6	6	6
3	(Argentina) Gastón Gaudio	3	3	4

=== Top half ===
==== Section 1 ====
First round
(Brazil) G Kuerten	4	1
Q	(United States) H Armando	6	6
(Spain) N Almagro	6^{4}	0
(Spain) F Verdasco	7^{7}	6
Q	(Germany) S Greul	6	6^{7}	2
(Czech Republic) T Zíb	4	7^{9}	6
WC	(Germany) T Summerer	1	4
(Argentina) J Mónaco	6	6

Second round
1	(Spain) R Nadal	6	6
Q	(United States) H Armando	1	2
(Spain) F Verdasco	6	5	7^{7}
14	(Russia) I Andreev	4	7	6^{5}
12	(Romania) A Pavel	7	3	1
(Czech Republic) T Zíb	5	6	6
(Argentina) J Mónaco	6	6
5	(Spain) D Ferrer	4	2

Third round
1	(Spain) R Nadal	6	6
(Spain) F Verdasco	3	2
(Czech Republic) T Zíb	6	7^{7}
(Argentina) J Mónaco	4	6^{4}

Quarterfinals
1	(Spain) R Nadal	6	6
(Czech Republic) T Zíb	2	1

==== Section 2 ====
First round
(France) G Monfils	2	3
(Italy) P Starace	6	6
(Germany) F Mayer	6^{3}	3
(Italy) A Seppi	7^{7}	6
(Finland) J Nieminen	6^{5}	6	6
(Germany) L Burgsmüller	7^{7}	0	1
Q	(Argentina) C Berlocq	2	2
(Romania) R Sabău	6	6

Second round
4	(Spain) T Robredo	6^{4}	6	6
(Italy) P Starace	7^{7}	3	2
(Italy) A Seppi	6	6
15	(Spain) A Martín	4	4
10	(Austria) J Melzer	4	7^{7}	4
(Finland) J Nieminen	6	6^{4}	6
(Romania) R Sabău	6	4	0
6	(Czech Republic) J Novák	4	6	6

Third round
4	(Spain) T Robredo	5	6	1
(Italy) A Seppi	7	2	6
(Finland) J Nieminen	2	6	7^{10}
6	(Czech Republic) J Novák	6	2	6^{8}

Quarterfinals
(Italy) A Seppi	2	3
(Finland) J Nieminen	6	6

=== Bottom half ===
==== Section 3 ====
First round
(France) G Simon	6^{3}	6	6
(Spain) A Montañés	7^{7}	1	1
(Argentina) M Zabaleta	6	6
WC	(Germany) A Thron	2	3
(Spain) A Costa	6	6
Q	(Spain) G Blanco	4	4
(Italy) A di Mauro	4	3
WC	(Germany) A Beck	6	6

Second round
8	(Italy) F Volandri	3	6	4
(France) G Simon	6	2	6
(Argentina) M Zabaleta	4	6	6
9	(Belgium) O Rochus	6	2	3
16	(France) P-H Mathieu	6	6
(Spain) A Costa	3	4
WC	(Germany) A Beck	3	3
3	(Argentina) G Gaudio	6	6

Third round
(France) G Simon	6^{3}	1
(Argentina) M Zabaleta	7^{7}	6
16	(France) P-H Mathieu	2	7^{7}	0
3	(Argentina) G Gaudio	6	6^{3}	6

Quarterfinals
(Argentina) M Zabaleta	4	6	2
3	(Argentina) G Gaudio	6	1	6

==== Section 4 ====
First round
(Germany) R Schüttler	7^{7}	6
Q	(Spain) F Vicente	6^{3}	4
Q	(Argentina) JP Brzezicki	6	3	3
(Germany) P Kohlschreiber	3	6	6
WC	(Germany) A Waske	7	6
(France) J Haehnel	5	2
(Spain) R Ramírez Hidalgo	6	6
(Austria) S Koubek	4	3

Second round
7	(Russia) M Youzhny	5	3
(Germany) R Schüttler	7	6
(Germany) P Kohlschreiber	6^{4}	6	3
11	(Czech Republic) T Berdych	7^{7}	1	6
13	(Argentina) J Acasuso	5	4
WC	(Germany) A Waske	7	6
(Spain) R Ramírez Hidalgo	4	1
2	(Russia) N Davydenko	6	6

Third round
(Germany) R Schüttler	6^{4}	1
11	(Czech Republic) T Berdych	7^{7}	6
WC	(Germany) A Waske	6^{3}	3
2	(Russia) N Davydenko	7^{7}	6

Quarterfinals
11	(Czech Republic) T Berdych	4	2
2	(Russia) N Davydenko	6	6
