= 2006 Movistar Open – Singles =

Singles
- 2006 Movistar Open

Final
- Champion: (Argentina) José Acasuso
- Runner-up: (Chile) Nicolás Massú
- Score: 6–4, 6–3

Details
- Draw: 32
- Seeds: 8

Events
Singles	Doubles
- Movistar Open

Gastón Gaudio was the defending champion, but lost to Rubén Ramírez Hidalgo in the second round this year.

José Acasuso won the title, defeating Nicolás Massú 6–4, 6–3 in the final.

This was the first ATP tournament in which future Grand Slam champion Juan Martín del Potro entered.

== Seeds ==
1. (Argentina) Gastón Gaudio (second round)
2. (Chile) Fernando González (semifinals)
3. (Argentina) José Acasuso (champion)
4. (Argentina) Agustín Calleri (first round)
5. (Chile) Nicolás Massú (final)
6. (Spain) Albert Montañés (quarterfinals)
7. (Argentina) Carlos Berlocq (first round)
8. (Serbia and Montenegro) Boris Pašanski (quarterfinals)

== Draw ==
Key

- Q = Qualifier
- WC = Wild card
- LL = Lucky loser
- Alt = Alternate
- ITF = ITF entry
- PR = Protected ranking
- SR = Special ranking
- SE = Special exempt
- JE = Junior exempt
- JR = Junior Accelerator Programme entrant
- CO = College Accelerator Programme entrant
- NG = Next Gen Accelerator Program entrant
- w/o = Walkover
- r = Retired
- d = Defaulted

=== Finals ===
Semifinals
(Spain) Rubén Ramírez Hidalgo	2	4
3	(Argentina) José Acasuso	6	6
5	(Chile) Nicolás Massú	3	7^{7}	6
2	(Chile) Fernando González	6	6^{3}	4

Final
3	(Argentina) José Acasuso	6	6
2	(Chile) Nicolás Massú	4	3

=== Top half ===
First round
1	(Argentina) G Gaudio	6	6
WC	(Chile) F Parada	1	4
(Spain) N Almagro	6	3	1
(Spain) R R Hidalgo	0	6	6
(Chile) P Capdeville	3	6	3
(Spain) S Ventura	6	0	6
(Argentina) J Mónaco	4	2
6	(Spain) Montañés	6	6
3	(Argentina) J Acasuso	6	6
(Spain) I Navarro	3	2
Q	(Argentina) G Marcaccio	7^{8}	0	6
(Peru) L Horna	6^{6}	6	3
WC	(Chile) J Aguilar	6	6
WC	(Chile) G Hormazábal	4	2
Q	(Czech Republic) L Friedl	6^{5}	6	6
7	(Argentina) C Berlocq	7^{7}	3	1

Second round
1	(Argentina) G Gaudio	7^{8}	1	4
(Spain) R R Hidalgo	6^{6}	6	6
(Spain) S Ventura	6	4	3
6	(Spain) Montañés	4	6	6
3	(Argentina) J Acasuso	6	6
Q	(Argentina) G Marcaccio	1	1
WC	(Chile) J Aguilar	6^{4}	3
Q	(Czech Republic) L Friedl	7^{7}	6

Quarterfinals
(Spain) R R Hidalgo	6	2	6
6	(Spain) Montañés	2	6	2
3	(Argentina) J Acasuso	3	6	7
Q	(Czech Republic) L Friedl	6	1	5

Semifinals
(Spain) R R Hidalgo	2	4
3	(Argentina) J Acasuso	6	6

=== Bottom half ===
First round
5	(Chile) N Massú	6	6
(Brazil) M Daniel	3	3
Q	(United States) H Armando	2	3
(Costa Rica) J A Marín	6	6
Q	(Spain) C Cuadrado	7	6
(Germany) T Behrend	5	0
LL	(Spain) D Gimeno Traver	1	6	6
4	(Argentina) A Calleri	6	3	3
8	(Serbia and Montenegro) B Pašanski	1	7	6
(Brazil) F Saretta	6	5	3
(Italy) A di Mauro	6^{6}	6	6
(Chile) A García	7^{8}	1	4
(Argentina) J M del Potro	6	6
(Spain) A Portas	2	2
(Greece) V Mazarakis	1	2
2	(Chile) F González	6	6

Second round
5	(Chile) N Massú	6	6
(Costa Rica) J A Marín	3	4
Q	(Spain) C Cuadrado	6	6
LL	(Spain) D Gimeno Traver	3	3
8	(Serbia and Montenegro) B Pašanski	6^{2}	7^{7}	6
(Italy) A di Mauro	7^{7}	6^{4}	0
(Argentina) J M del Potro	3	6^{4}
2	(Chile) F González	6	7^{7}

Quarterfinals
5	(Chile) N Massú	4	7^{7}	6
Q	(Spain) C Cuadrado	6	6^{4}	3
8	(Serbia and Montenegro) B Pašanski	4	3
2	(Chile) F González	6	6

Semifinals
5	(Chile) N Massú	3	7^{7}	6
2	(Chile) F González	6	6^{3}	4
