= 2009 Movistar Open =

- Date: 2–8 February
- Edition: 16th
- Category: World Tour 250
- Draw: 28S / 16D
- Prize money: $445,000
- Surface: Clay / outdoor
- Location: Viña del Mar, Chile

Champions

Singles
- (Chile) Fernando González

Doubles
- (Uruguay) Pablo Cuevas / (Argentina) Brian Dabul
← 2008 ·	Chile Open	· 2010 →

The 2009 Movistar Open was a men's tennis tournament played on outdoor clay courts. It was the 16th edition of the Movistar Open, and part of the ATP World Tour 250 series of the 2009 ATP World Tour. It took place in Viña del Mar, Chile from 2 February through 8 February 2009.

The singles line up was led by world no. 15 and defending champion Fernando González, Tommy Robredo and Albert Montañés. Other top seeds are José Acasuso, Juan Mónaco, Eduardo Schwank, Agustín Calleri and Óscar Hernández. Fernando González won the single title, his fourth at the event after 2002, 2004, and 2008.

== Finals ==
=== Singles ===
(Chile) Fernando González defeated (Argentina) José Acasuso, 6–1, 6–3

- It was González' first title of the year and 11th (and last) of his career.

=== Doubles ===
(Uruguay) Pablo Cuevas / (Argentina) Brian Dabul defeated (Czech Republic) František Čermák / (Slovakia) Michal Mertiňák 6–3, 6–3
