= 2003 MercedesCup – Singles =

Singles
- 2003 MercedesCup

Final
- Champion: (Argentina) Guillermo Coria
- Runner-up: (Spain) Tommy Robredo
- Score: 6–2, 6–2, 6–1

Details
- Draw: 48
- Seeds: 16

Events
| Singles | Doubles |
- Stuttgart Open

Mikhail Youzhny was the defending champion but lost in the quarterfinals to Guillermo Coria.

Second-seeded Coria won in the final 6–2, 6–2, 6–1 against Tommy Robredo.

== Seeds ==
A champion seed is indicated in bold text while text in italics indicates the round in which that seed was eliminated. All sixteen seeds received a bye to the second round.

1. (Spain) Carlos Moyá (second round)
2. (Argentina) **Guillermo Coria (champion)**
3. (Germany) Rainer Schüttler (quarterfinals)
4. (France) Sébastien Grosjean (second round)
5. (Czech Republic) Jiří Novák (third round)
6. (Chile) Fernando González (semifinals)
7. (Spain) Félix Mantilla (second round)
8. (Spain) Albert Costa (second round)
9. (Spain) Tommy Robredo (final)
10. (Morocco) Younes El Aynaoui (third round)
11. (Finland) Jarkko Nieminen (third round)
12. (Russia) Mikhail Youzhny (quarterfinals)
13. (Belarus) Max Mirnyi (third round)
14. (Russia) Nikolay Davydenko (third round)
15. (Spain) Àlex Corretja (third round)
16. (Croatia) Ivan Ljubičić (second round)

== Draw ==
Key

- Q = Qualifier
- WC = Wild card
- LL = Lucky loser
- Alt = Alternate
- ITF = ITF entry
- PR = Protected ranking
- SR = Special ranking
- SE = Special exempt
- JE = Junior exempt
- JR = Junior Accelerator Programme entrant
- CO = College Accelerator Programme entrant
- NG = Next Gen Accelerator Program entrant
- w/o = Walkover
- r = Retired
- d = Defaulted

=== Finals ===
Semifinals
6 | (Chile) Fernando González | 2 | 1^{r}
9 | (Spain) **Tommy Robredo** | **6** | 4
(Spain) Feliciano López | 4 | 0
2 | (Argentina) **Guillermo Coria** | **6** | **6**

Final
9 | (Spain) Tommy Robredo | 2 | 2 | 1
2 | (Argentina) **Guillermo Coria** | **6** | **6** | **6**

=== Top half ===
==== Section 1 ====
First round
(France) J Boutter | **6** | 2 | 1
(Germany) **T Behrend** | 3 | **6** | **6**
Q | (Italy) P Starace | 3 | 5
Q | (Spain) **M López** | **6** | **7**
(Spain) **A Martín** | **7^{7}** | **6**
(Paraguay) R Delgado | 6^{1} | 3
(Spain) **R Nadal** | **7** | **6**
WC | (Germany) P Petzschner | 5 | 1

Second round
1 | (Spain) C Moyá | 6^{5} | 6^{2}
(Germany) **T Behrend** | **7^{7}** | **7^{7}**
Q | (Spain) M López | 4 | 3
13 | (Belarus) **M Mirnyi** | **6** | **6**
11 | (Finland) **J Nieminen** | **6** | 4 | **6**
(Spain) A Martín | 2 | **6** | 4
(Spain) R Nadal | 2 | **6** | 2
6 | (Chile) **F González** | **6** | 3 | **6**

Third round
(Germany) **T Behrend** | **6** | **6**
13 | (Belarus) M Mirnyi | 4 | 4
11 | (Finland) J Nieminen | 6^{2} | **7^{7}** | 3
6 | (Chile) **F González** | **7^{7}** | 6^{5} | **6**

Quarterfinals
(Germany) T Behrend | 5 | 3
6 | (Chile) **F González** | **7** | **6**

==== Section 2 ====
First round
(Italy) **F Volandri** | **6** | 3
(Spain) D Sánchez | 0 | 0^{r}
Q | (Italy) R Furlan | 4 | 1
(France) **O Mutis** | **6** | **6**
(Germany) **L Burgsmüller** | **6** | **7**
(Sweden) M Norman | 4 | 5
Q | (Czech Republic) **J Vaněk** | 4 | **6** | **6**
WC | (Germany) S Greul | **6** | 1 | 3

Second round
4 | (France) S Grosjean | 2 | 1
(Italy) **F Volandri** | **6** | **6**
(France) O Mutis | 0 | 6^{3}
14 | (Russia) **N Davydenko** | **6** | **7^{7}**
9 | (Spain) **T Robredo** | 6^{7} | **6** | **7**
(Germany) L Burgsmüller | **7^{9}** | 3 | 5
Q | (Czech Republic) **J Vaněk** | **7^{7}** | **6**
8 | (Spain) A Costa | 6^{4} | 3

Third round
(Italy) **F Volandri** | **6** | 3 | **6**
14 | (Russia) N Davydenko | 3 | **6** | 1
9 | (Spain) **T Robredo** | **6** | 6^{6} | **6**
Q | (Czech Republic) J Vaněk | 2 | **7^{8}** | 3

Quarterfinals
(Italy) F Volandri | 4 | 2
9 | (Spain) **T Robredo** | **6** | **6**

=== Bottom half ===
==== Section 3 ====
First round
(Brazil) R Mello | 1 | 4
(Spain) **F López** | **6** | **6**
WC | (Germany) A Popp | 3 | 2
Q | (Argentina) **G Etlis** | **6** | **6**
(Switzerland) M Kratochvil | **6** | 2 | 3
(Belgium) **O Rochus** | 3 | **6** | **6**
WC | (Germany) **M Abel** | 2 | **6** | **7^{7}**
(France) A Dupuis | **6** | 3 | 6^{5}

Second round
7 | (Spain) F Mantilla | **6** | 3 | 6^{7}
(Spain) **F López** | 1 | **6** | **7^{9}**
Q | (Argentina) G Etlis | 6^{4} | 4
10 | (Morocco) **Y El Aynaoui** | **7^{7}** | **6**
15 | (Spain) **À Corretja** | 4 | **6** | **7**
(Belgium) O Rochus | **6** | 1 | 5
WC | (Germany) M Abel | 2 | 4
3 | (Germany) **R Schüttler** | **6** | **6**

Third round
(Spain) **F López** | 3 | **6** | **6**
10 | (Morocco) Y El Aynaoui | **6** | 4 | 3
15 | (Spain) À Corretja | 4 | 4
3 | (Germany) **R Schüttler** | **6** | **6**

Quarterfinals
(Spain) **F López** | **6** | **6**
3 | (Germany) R Schüttler | 2 | 4

==== Section 4 ====
First round
(Brazil) F Saretta | 4 | 2
(Armenia) **S Sargsian** | **6** | **6**
(Ecuador) **N Lapentti** | **6** | **6**
(Austria) S Koubek | 4 | 2
(Spain) **D Ferrer** | **7^{7}** | **6**
(Argentina) M Zabaleta | 6^{3} | 4
(France) **P-H Mathieu** | **6** | **6**
Q | (Czech Republic) T Zíb | 1 | 2

Second round
5 | (Czech Republic) **J Novák** | **6** | **6**
(Armenia) S Sargsian | 4 | 4
(Ecuador) N Lapentti | 3 | **6** | 3
12 | (Russia) **M Youzhny** | **6** | 2 | **6**
16 | (Croatia) I Ljubičić | 6^{3} | 1
(Spain) **D Ferrer** | **7^{7}** | **6**
(France) P-H Mathieu | 5 | 3
2 | (Argentina) **G Coria** | **7** | **6**

Third round
5 | (Czech Republic) J Novák | 6^{1} | 4
12 | (Russia) **M Youzhny** | **7^{7}** | **6**
(Spain) D Ferrer | 1 | 1
2 | (Argentina) **G Coria** | **6** | **6**

Quarterfinals
12 | (Russia) M Youzhny | 0 | 0
2 | (Argentina) **G Coria** | **6** | **6**
