= 2006 Movistar Open – Doubles =

Doubles
- 2006 Movistar Open

Final
- Champions: (Argentina) José Acasuso (Argentina) Sebastián Prieto
- Runners-up: (Czech Republic) František Čermák (Czech Republic) Leoš Friedl
- Score: 7–6^{(7–2)}, 6–4

Events
Singles	Doubles
← 2005 ·	Movistar Open	· 2007 →

David Ferrer and Santiago Ventura were the defending champions, but Ferrer did not participate this year. Ventura partnered with Flávio Saretta, losing in the first round.

José Acasuso and Sebastián Prieto won the title, defeating František Čermák and Leoš Friedl 7–6^{(7–2)}, 6–4 in the final.

== Seeds ==
1. (Czech Republic) František Čermák / (Czech Republic) Leoš Friedl (final)
2. (Argentina) José Acasuso / (Argentina) Sebastián Prieto (champions)
3. (Argentina) Martín García / (Peru) Luis Horna (semifinals)
4. (Argentina) Agustín Calleri / (Argentina) Gastón Etlis (semifinals)

== Draw ==
=== Key ===
- Q = Qualifier
- WC = Wild card
- LL = Lucky loser
- Alt = Alternate
- SE = Special exempt
- PR = Protected ranking
- ITF = ITF entry
- JE = Junior exempt
- w/o = Walkover
- r = Retired
- d = Defaulted
- SR = Special ranking

=== Draw ===
First round
1	(Czech Republic) F Čermák (Czech Republic) L Friedl	6	6
(Serbia and Montenegro) B Pašanski (Spain) R Ramírez Hidalgo	4	4
(Spain) N Almagro (Spain) D Gimeno-Traver	3	1
(Spain) A Montañés (Spain) A Portas	6	6
3	(Argentina) M García (Peru) L Horna	6	6
(Argentina) C Berlocq (Italy) T Tenconi	3	4
Alt	(Argentina) G Marcaccio (Serbia and Montenegro) D Vemić	6	0	[4]
(Germany) T Behrend (Brazil) M Daniel	4	6	[10]
WC	(Chile) J Aguilar (Chile) F Parada	6	2
(Argentina) JM del Potro (Argentina) J Mónaco	4	1^{r}
(Chile) P Capdeville (Chile) A García	2	5
4	(Argentina) A Calleri (Argentina) G Etlis	6	7
(Greece) V Mazarakis (Spain) I Navarro-Pastor	6	4	[11]
WC	(Spain) C Cuadrado (Chile) P Harboe	3	6	[9]
(Brazil) F Saretta (Spain) S Ventura	4	3
2	(Argentina) J Acasuso (Argentina) S Prieto	6	6

Quarterfinals
1	(Czech Republic) F Čermák (Czech Republic) L Friedl	6	6
(Spain) A Montañés (Spain) A Portas	1	0
3	(Argentina) M García (Peru) L Horna	7	6
(Germany) T Behrend (Brazil) M Daniel	5	1
WC	(Chile) J Aguilar (Chile) F Parada	3	4
4	(Argentina) A Calleri (Argentina) G Etlis	6	6
(Greece) V Mazarakis (Spain) I Navarro-Pastor	2	2
2	(Argentina) J Acasuso (Argentina) S Prieto	6	6

Semifinals
1	(Czech Republic) F Čermák (Czech Republic) L Friedl	5	6	[10]
3	(Argentina) M García (Peru) L Horna	7	4	[7]
4	(Argentina) A Calleri (Argentina) G Etlis	2	4
2	(Argentina) J Acasuso (Argentina) S Prieto	6	6

Final
1	(Czech Republic) F Čermák (Czech Republic) L Friedl	6^{2}	4
2	(Argentina) J Acasuso (Argentina) S Prieto	7^{7}	6
