= 2008 Movistar Open – Singles =

Singles
- 2008 Movistar Open

Final
- Champion: (Chile) Fernando González
- Runner-up: (Argentina) Juan Mónaco
- Score: walkover

Details
- Draw: 32
- Seeds: 8

Events
Singles	Doubles
- Movistar Open

Luis Horna was the defending champion, but lost in the second round to Carlos Berlocq.

Fernando González won with a walkover, after Juan Mónaco withdrew from the final due to a left ankle injury.

== Seeds ==
1. (Chile) Fernando González (champion)
2. (Argentina) Juan Ignacio Chela (first round)
3. (Argentina) Juan Mónaco (final, withdrew due to a left ankle injury)
4. (Spain) Fernando Verdasco (second round)
5. (Argentina) Agustín Calleri (first round)
6. (Spain) Óscar Hernández (first round)
7. (Argentina) José Acasuso (quarterfinals)
8. (Chile) Nicolás Massú (first round)

== Draw ==
Key

- Q = Qualifier
- WC = Wild card
- LL = Lucky loser
- Alt = Alternate
- ITF = ITF entry
- PR = Protected ranking
- SR = Special ranking
- SE = Special exempt
- JE = Junior exempt
- JR = Junior Accelerator Programme entrant
- CO = College Accelerator Programme entrant
- NG = Next Gen Accelerator Program entrant
- w/o = Walkover
- r = Retired
- d = Defaulted

=== Finals ===
Semifinals
1	(Chile) Fernando González	6^{4}	7^{8}	6
(Uruguay) Pablo Cuevas	7^{7}	6^{6}	2
3	(Argentina) Juan Mónaco	6	6
(Spain) Santiago Ventura	2	4

Final
1	(Chile) Fernando González	w/o
3	(Argentina) Juan Mónaco

=== Top half ===
First round
1	(Chile) F González	7	6
(Chile) P Capdeville	5	3
(Argentina) M Zabaleta	3	5
(Argentina) D Hartfield	6	7
(France) N Devilder	5	2
(Argentina) C Berlocq	7	6
(Peru) L Horna	6	6
5	(Argentina) A Calleri	4	4
4	(Spain) F Verdasco	6	6
WC	(Chile) H Podlipnik	4	3
(Argentina) G Coria	4	6	3
(Uruguay) P Cuevas	6	4	6
Q	(Argentina) E Schwank	4	6	1
Q	(Spain) D Gimeno Traver	6	1	6
(Australia) P Luczak	2	4
7	(Argentina) J Acasuso	6	6

Second round
1	(Chile) F González	6	6
(Argentina) D Hartfield	3	4
(Argentina) C Berlocq	7^{7}	3	7^{7}
(Peru) L Horna	6^{3}	6	6^{3}
4	(Spain) F Verdasco	5	3
(Uruguay) P Cuevas	7	6
Q	(Spain) D Gimeno Traver	2	2
7	(Argentina) J Acasuso	6	6

Quarterfinals
1	(Chile) F González	7	6
(Argentina) C Berlocq	5	0
(Uruguay) P Cuevas	6	6
7	(Argentina) J Acasuso	3	3

Semifinals
1	(Chile) F González	6^{4}	7^{8}	6
(Uruguay) P Cuevas	7^{7}	6^{6}	2

=== Bottom half ===
First round
6	(Spain) Ó Hernández	6^{4}	1
(Argentina) JP Brzezcki	7^{7}	6
(Serbia) B Pašanski	6^{4}	2
Q	(Spain) M Granollers Pujol	7^{7}	6
(Argentina) M Vassallo Argüello	6	6
(France) O Patience	4	1
(Ecuador) N Lapentti	6	3	4
3	(Argentina) J Mónaco	2	6	6
8	(Chile) N Massú	7^{7}	6^{4}	3
(Argentina) S Roitman	6^{3}	7^{7}	6
WC	(Argentina) G Gaudio	3	0
(Spain) S Ventura	6	6
WC	(Chile) A García	7^{7}	6^{3}	4
Q	(Spain) D Marrero	6^{2}	7^{7}	6
(Italy) F Fognini	7^{7}	6
2	(Argentina) JI Chela	6^{0}	2

Second round
(Argentina) JP Brzezicki	6	6
Q	(Spain) M Granollers Pujol	2	2
(Argentina) M Vassallo Argüello	3	6	5
3	(Argentina) J Mónaco	6	4	7
(Argentina) S Roitman	6	3	6^{4}
(Spain) S Ventura	4	6	7^{7}
Q	(Spain) D Marrero	4	7^{7}	3
(Italy) F Fognini	6	6^{5}	6

Quarterfinals
(Argentina) JP Brzezicki	2	3
3	(Argentina) J Mónaco	6	6
(Spain) S Ventura	6	6
(Italy) F Fognini	3	3

Semifinals
3	(Argentina) J Mónaco	6	6
(Spain) S Ventura	2	4

== Qualifying ==
=== Seeds ===
1. (Spain) Marcel Granollers Pujol (qualified)
2. (Spain) Rubén Ramírez Hidalgo (qualifying competition)
3. (Spain) Daniel Gimeno Traver (qualified)
4. (Argentina) Eduardo Schwank (qualified)
5. (Brazil) Thomaz Bellucci (qualifying competition)
6. (Spain) Daniel Muñoz de la Nava (second round)
7. (United Kingdom) Jamie Baker (second round)
8. (Spain) Gabriel Trujillo Soler (second round)

=== Qualifiers ===
1. (Spain) Marcel Granollers Pujol
2. (Spain) David Marrero
3. (Spain) Daniel Gimeno Traver
4. (Argentina) Eduardo Schwank

=== Qualifying draw ===
==== First qualifier ====
First round
1	(Spain) Marcel Granollers Pujol	6	6
(United Kingdom) Jamie Murray	4	2
WC	(Chile) Víctor Morales	3	2
(Chile) Julio Peralta	6	6
(Brazil) André Sá	4	4
(Peru) Iván Miranda	6	6
(Greece) Vasilis Mazarakis	7^{7}	4	3
6	(Spain) Daniel Muñoz de la Nava	6^{0}	6	6

Second round
1	(Spain) Marcel Granollers Pujol	6^{7}	2
(Chile) Julio Peralta	7^{9}	3^{r}
(Peru) Iván Miranda	6	7
6	(Spain) Daniel Muñoz de la Nava	4	5

Qualifying competition
1	(Spain) Marcel Granollers Pujol	6	6
(Peru) Iván Miranda	2	3

==== Second qualifier ====
First round
2	(Spain) Rubén Ramírez Hidalgo	6	6
(United States) Hugo Armando	2	2
(Italy) Francesco Aldi	6	6
(Italy) Gianluca Naso	3	1
(Argentina) Martín Alund	3	4
(Spain) David Marrero	6	6
(Chile) Jorge Aguilar	3	5
8	(Spain) Gabriel Trujillo Soler	6	7

Second round
2	(Spain) Rubén Ramírez Hidalgo	6	6
(Italy) Francesco Aldi	2	3
(Spain) David Marrero	6	1	6
8	(Spain) Gabriel Trujillo Soler	4	6	4

Qualifying competition
2	(Spain) Rubén Ramírez Hidalgo	6	3	5
(Spain) David Marrero	3	6	7

==== Third qualifier ====
First round
3	(Spain) Daniel Gimeno Traver	6	6
WC	(Chile) Luis Ignacio Morales	1	0
(Italy) Simone Vagnozzi	4	6	6
(Argentina) Diego Junqueira	6	2	4
(Spain) Miguel Pérez Puigdomenech	3	3
(Argentina) Horacio Zeballos	6	6
(Chile) Borja Malo	4	3
7	(United Kingdom) Jamie Baker	6	6

Second round
3	(Spain) Daniel Gimeno Traver	6	6
(Italy) Simone Vagnozzi	2	0
(Argentina) Horacio Zeballos	6	6
7	(United Kingdom) Jamie Baker	1	3

Qualifying competition
3	(Spain) Daniel Gimeno Traver	0	6	6
(Argentina) Horacio Zeballos	6	3	1

==== Fourth qualifier ====
First round
4	(Argentina) Eduardo Schwank	6	6
(Sweden) Pablo Figueroa	2	1
(Chile) Guillermo Hormazábal	6	6
(Argentina) Gustavo Marcaccio	3	3
WC	(Chile) Guillermo Rivera Aránguiz	6	7
WC	(Chile) Ricardo Urzúa-Rivera	4	5
(Spain) José Antonio Sánchez de Luna	3	1
5	(Brazil) Thomaz Bellucci	6	6

Second round
4	(Argentina) Eduardo Schwank	6	6
(Chile) Guillermo Hormazábal	1	1
WC	(Chile) Guillermo Rivera Aránguiz	1	5
5	(Brazil) Thomaz Bellucci	6	7

Qualifying competition
4	(Argentina) Eduardo Schwank	6	7^{7}
5	(Brazil) Thomaz Bellucci	3	6^{2}
