= 2010 Movistar Open – Singles =

Singles
- 2010 Movistar Open

Final
- Champion: (Brazil) Thomaz Bellucci
- Runner-up: (Argentina) Juan Mónaco
- Score: 6–2, 0–6, 6–4

Details
- Draw: 32
- Seeds: 8

Events
Singles	Doubles
- Movistar Open

Fernando González was the defending champion, but he lost to Thomaz Bellucci 3–6, 6–4, 6–3 in the semifinals.
Bellucci won in the final 6–2, 0–6, 6–4 against Juan Mónaco.

== Seeds ==
1. (Chile) Fernando González (semifinals)
2. (Argentina) Juan Mónaco (final)
3. (Brazil) Thomaz Bellucci (champion)
4. (Uruguay) Pablo Cuevas (first round)
5. (Argentina) Horacio Zeballos (first round)
6. (Argentina) José Acasuso (second round, retired because of a left knee injury)
7. (Germany) Simon Greul (first round)
8. (Italy) Potito Starace (first round)

== Draw ==
Key

- Q = Qualifier
- WC = Wild card
- LL = Lucky loser
- Alt = Alternate
- ITF = ITF entry
- PR = Protected ranking
- SR = Special ranking
- SE = Special exempt
- JE = Junior exempt
- JR = Junior Accelerator Programme entrant
- CO = College Accelerator Programme entrant
- NG = Next Gen Accelerator Program entrant
- w/o = Walkover
- r = Retired
- d = Defaulted

=== Finals ===
Semifinals
1	(Chile) Fernando González	6	4	3
3	(Brazil) Thomaz Bellucci	3	6	6
Q	(Brazil) João Souza	1	4
2	(Argentina) Juan Mónaco	6	6

Final
3	(Brazil) Thomaz Bellucci	6	0	6
2	(Argentina) Juan Mónaco	2	6	4

=== Top half ===
First round
1	(Chile) F González	6	6
(Spain) Ó Hernández	2	1
(Romania) V Crivoi	4	2
Q	(Spain) R Ramírez Hidalgo	6	6
(Argentina) M Vassallo Argüello	6	3	r
(Spain) M Granollers	4	6
(Poland) Ł Kubot	3	7	6
5	(Argentina) H Zeballos	6	5	3
3	(Brazil) T Bellucci	3	6	6
(Ecuador) N Lapentti	6	1	1
(Chile) P Capdeville	4	6	6
WC	(Chile) C Saavedra-Corvalán	6	2	1
(Argentina) E Schwank	4	7^{7}	6
(Italy) P Lorenzi	6	6^{3}	3
WC	(Chile) H Podlipnik Castillo	1	1
6	(Argentina) J Acasuso	6	6

Second round
1	(Chile) F González	6	6
Q	(Spain) R Ramírez Hidalgo	4	3
(Spain) M Granollers	6	6
(Poland) Ł Kubot	4	2
3	(Brazil) T Bellucci	5	6	7
(Chile) P Capdeville	7	4	5
(Argentina) E Schwank	6^{3}	6
6	(Argentina) J Acasuso	7^{7}	2	r

Quarterfinals
1	(Chile) F González	7^{10}	7^{11}
(Spain) M Granollers	6^{8}	6^{9}
3	(Brazil) T Bellucci	6	6
(Argentina) E Schwank	4	4

Semifinals
1	(Chile) F González	6	4	3
3	(Brazil) T Bellucci	3	6	6

=== Bottom half ===
First round
7	(Germany) S Greul	6	4	6^{5}
Q	(Brazil) J Souza	3	6	7^{7}
(Spain) S Ventura	3	5
(Spain) P Riba	6	7
(Brazil) M Daniel	7^{7}	5	4
(Spain) A Martín	6^{5}	7	6
(Brazil) R Mello	7^{7}	6
4	(Uruguay) P Cuevas	6^{5}	3
8	(Italy) P Starace	6^{3}	4
(Australia) P Luczak	7^{7}	6
Q	(Spain) D Marrero	7^{7}	2	7^{7}
Q	(Argentina) J-M Aranguren	6^{4}	6	6^{2}
WC	(Chile) J Aguilar	5	2
(Argentina) JI Chela	7	6
(Chile) N Massú	3	4
2	(Argentina) J Mónaco	6	6

Second round
Q	(Brazil) J Souza	6	6
(Spain) P Riba	4	4
(Spain) A Martín	6	6
(Brazil) R Mello	3	4
(Australia) P Luczak	6	7^{7}
Q	(Spain) D Marrero	3	6^{4}
(Argentina) JI Chela	3	5
2	(Argentina) J Mónaco	6	7

Quarterfinals
Q	(Brazil) J Souza	6	6
(Spain) A Martín	2	4
(Australia) P Luczak	4	6	3
2	(Argentina) J Mónaco	6	3	6

Semifinals
Q	(Brazil) J Souza	1	4
2	(Argentina) J Mónaco	6	6

== Qualifying ==
=== Seeds ===
1. (Argentina) Brian Dabul (second round)
2. (Italy) Flavio Cipolla (second round)
3. (Spain) Rubén Ramírez Hidalgo (qualified)
4. (Spain) David Marrero (qualified)
5. (Brazil) Júlio Silva (first round)
6. (Spain) Pablo Andújar (second round)
7. (Argentina) Gastón Gaudio (second round)
8. (Romania) Adrian Ungur (qualifying competition)

=== Qualifiers ===
1. (Argentina) Juan-Martín Aranguren
2. (Brazil) João Souza
3. (Spain) Rubén Ramírez Hidalgo
4. (Spain) David Marrero

=== Qualifying draw ===
==== First qualifier ====
First round
1	(Argentina) Brian Dabul	6	6
WC	(North Macedonia) Tomislav Jotovski	0	1
(Serbia) Boris Pašanski	1	7	6
(Brazil) Ricardo Hocevar	6	5	3
(Argentina) Federico Delbonis	6^{3}	7	1
(Argentina) Juan-Martín Aranguren	7^{7}	5	6
WC	(Chile) Matías Sborowitz	0	1
7	(Argentina) Gastón Gaudio	6	6

Second round
1	(Argentina) Brian Dabul	1	2
(Serbia) Boris Pašanski	6	6
(Argentina) Juan-Martín Aranguren	3	6	6
7	(Argentina) Gastón Gaudio	6	3	1

Qualifying competition
(Serbia) Boris Pašanski	3	1
(Argentina) Juan-Martín Aranguren	6	6

==== Second qualifier ====
First round
2	(Italy) Flavio Cipolla	7	6
(Brazil) Fernando Romboli	5	0
(Brazil) João Souza	6^{1}	6	6
(Argentina) Diego Junqueira	7^{7}	3	4
(Argentina) Carlos Berlocq	5	2
(Chile) Adrián García	7	6
(Chile) Guillermo Rivera Aránguiz	1	6^{4}
6	(Spain) Pablo Andújar	6	7^{7}

Second round
2	(Italy) Flavio Cipolla	6^{1}	1
(Brazil) João Souza	7^{7}	6
(Chile) Adrián García	6	2	6
6	(Spain) Pablo Andújar	4	6	3

Qualifying competition
(Brazil) João Souza	7^{7}	7
(Chile) Adrián García	6^{2}	5

==== Third qualifier ====
First round
3	(Spain) Rubén Ramírez Hidalgo	6	6
(Chile) Rodrigo Pérez	4	0
(Brazil) Caio Zampieri	6	1	4
(Argentina) Facundo Bagnis	4	6	6
(Chile) Alex Theiler	1	3
(France) Nicolas Devilder	6	6
(Chile) Guillermo Hormazábal	6	1	2
8	(Romania) Adrian Ungur	4	6	6

Second round
3	(Spain) Rubén Ramírez Hidalgo	6	6
(Argentina) Facundo Bagnis	2	3
(France) Nicolas Devilder	4	1
8	(Romania) Adrian Ungur	6	6

Qualifying competition
3	(Spain) Rubén Ramírez Hidalgo	6	6
8	(Romania) Adrian Ungur	2	2

==== Fourth qualifier ====
First round
4	(Spain) David Marrero	6	6
WC	(Chile) Gonzalo Urruticoechea	0	1
WC	(Chile) Víctor Núñez Leal	3	1
(Italy) Filippo Volandri	6	6
(Uruguay) Marcel Felder	6	3	2
(Brazil) Rogério Dutra Silva	4	6	6
(Argentina) Guido Pella	3	7^{7}	6
5	(Brazil) Júlio Silva	6	6^{5}	4

Second round
4	(Spain) David Marrero	6	7
(Italy) Filippo Volandri	4	5
(Brazil) Rogério Dutra Silva	5	4
(Argentina) Guido Pella	7	6

Qualifying competition
4	(Spain) David Marrero	6^{3}	7	6
(Argentina) Guido Pella	7^{7}	5	2
