= 2005 French Open – Boys' doubles =

Boys' doubles
- 2005 French Open

Final
- Champion: (Argentina) Emiliano Massa (Argentina) Leonardo Mayer
- Runner-up: (Ukraine) Sergei Bubka (France) Jérémy Chardy
- Score: 2–6, 6–3, 6–4

Events
Singles	men	women		boys	girls
Doubles	men	women	mixed	boys	girls
WC Singles	men	women	quad
WC Doubles	men	women	quad
Legends	−45	45+	women
← 2004 ·	French Open	· 2006 →

Emiliano Massa and Leonardo Mayer won the title, defeating Sergei Bubka and Jérémy Chardy in the final, 2–6, 6–3, 6–4.

== Seeds ==
1. (Czech Republic) Dušan Lojda / (United States) Donald Young (first round)
2. (Austria) Andreas Haider-Maurer / (Croatia) Petar Jelenić (quarterfinals)
3. (South Korea) Kim Sun-yong / (Germany) Aljoscha Thron (semifinals)
4. (Italy) Andrea Arnaboldi / (Belgium) Niels Desein (first round)
5. (Brazil) Raony Carvalho / (The Bahamas) Ryan Sweeting (quarterfinals)
6. (United States) Timothy Neilly / (United States) Tim Smyczek (second round)
7. (Australia) Carsten Ball / (United States) Sam Querrey (second round)
8. (Ukraine) Sergei Bubka / (France) Jérémy Chardy (final)

== Draw ==
=== Key ===
- Q = Qualifier
- WC = Wild card
- LL = Lucky loser
- Alt = Alternate
- ITF = ITF entry
- PR = Protected ranking
- SR = Special ranking
- SE = Special exempt
- JE = Junior exempt
- JR = Junior Accelerator Programme entrant
- CO = College Accelerator Programme entrant
- NG = Next Gen Accelerator Program entrant
- w/o = Walkover
- r = Retired
- d = Defaulted

=== Finals ===
Semifinals
(Argentina) Emiliano Massa (Argentina) Leonardo Mayer	7^{7}	6
3	(South Korea) Kim Sun-yong (Germany) Aljoscha Thron	6^{3}	3
(Russia) Pavel Chekhov (Russia) Valery Rudnev	4	6	1
8	(Ukraine) Sergei Bubka (France) Jérémy Chardy	6	3	6

Final
(Argentina) Emiliano Massa (Argentina) Leonardo Mayer	2	6	6
8	(Ukraine) Sergei Bubka (France) Jérémy Chardy	6	3	4

=== Top half ===
First round
1	(Czech Republic) Dušan Lojda (United States) Donald Young	4	2
(Switzerland) Robin Roshardt (Switzerland) Alexander Sadecky	6	6
(Argentina) Emiliano Massa (Argentina) Leonardo Mayer	6	6
(Denmark) Martin Pedersen (Germany) Jochen Schoettler	1	3
WC	(France) Kevin Botti (France) Jérôme Inzerillo	3	7	7
(India) Jeevan Nedunchezhiyan (India) Sanam Singh	6	5	5
(United States) Matt Bruch (United States) Marcus Fugate	3	2
5	(Brazil) Raony Carvalho (The Bahamas) Ryan Sweeting	6	6
3	(South Korea) Kim Sun-yong (Germany) Aljoscha Thron	6	6
WC	(France) Jonathan Dasnières de Veigy (France) Boris Obama	1	2
(Russia) Evgeny Kirillov (Russia) Alexandre Krasnoroutskiy	6	4	3
(United States) Jesse Levine (United States) Michael Shabaz	4	6	6
(Australia) Andrew Coelho (Australia) Todd Ley	4	6	4
(Netherlands) Thiemo de Bakker (Netherlands) Antal van der Duim	6	4	6
(Croatia) Marin Čilić (Kuwait) Abdullah Maqdes	3	7	2
6	(United States) Timothy Neilly (United States) Tim Smyczek	6	5	6

Second round
(Switzerland) R Roshardt (Switzerland) A Sadecky	6^{3}	6	6
(Argentina) E Massa (Argentina) L Mayer	7^{7}	4	8
WC	(France) K Botti (France) J Inzerillo	2	4
5	(Brazil) R Carvalho (The Bahamas) R Sweeting	6	6
3	(South Korea) S-y Kim (Germany) A Thron	6	6
(United States) J Levine (United States) M Shabaz	3	3
(Netherlands) T de Bakker (Netherlands) A van der Duim	6	6
6	(United States) T Neilly (United States) T Smyczek	2	1

Quarterfinals
(Argentina) E Massa (Argentina) L Mayer	6	6
5	(Brazil) R Carvalho (The Bahamas) R Sweeting	2	2
3	(South Korea) S-y Kim (Germany) A Thron	6	6
(Netherlands) T de Bakker (Netherlands) A van der Duim	3	4

Semifinals
(Argentina) E Massa (Argentina) L Mayer	7^{7}	6
3	(South Korea) S-y Kim (Germany) A Thron	6^{3}	3

=== Bottom half ===
First round
7	(Australia) Carsten Ball (United States) Sam Querrey	6	3	6
WC	(France) Jonathan Dahan (France) Yannick Thivant	3	6	1
(Argentina) Juan Martín del Potro (Venezuela) David Navarrete	5	6^{6}
(Russia) Pavel Chekhov (Russia) Valery Rudnev	7	7^{8}
(United States) Kellen Damico (United States) Jamie Hunt	6	5	1
(United Kingdom) Andrew Kennaugh (United Kingdom) Andy Murray	4	7	6
(Ukraine) Alexandr Dolgopolov (Belarus) Serguei Tarasevitch	7^{7}	6^{2}	7
4	(Italy) Andrea Arnaboldi (Belgium) Niels Desein	6^{1}	7^{7}	5
8	(Ukraine) Sergei Bubka (France) Jérémy Chardy	6	6
(Slovakia) Pavol Červenák (Slovakia) Lukáš Lacko	4	2
(Hong Kong) Martin Sayer (India) Vivek Shokeen	3	4
(Canada) Philip Bester (Canada) Peter Polansky	6	6
WC	(France) Adrian Mannarino (France) Alexandre Sidorenko	1	5
(United States) Alex Clayton (Venezuela) Piero Luisi	6	7
(Brazil) Luis-Henrique Grangeiro (Brazil) André Miele	6	2	8
2	(Austria) Andreas Haider-Maurer (Croatia) Petar Jelenić	2	6	10

Second round
7	(Australia) C Ball (United States) S Querrey	6^{4}	3
(Russia) P Chekhov (Russia) V Rudnev	7^{7}	6
(United Kingdom) A Kennaugh (United Kingdom) A Murray	6	6
(Ukraine) A Dolgopolov (Belarus) S Tarasevitch	3	4
8	(Ukraine) S Bubka (France) J Chardy	5	6	13
(Canada) P Bester (Canada) P Polansky	7	4	11
(United States) A Clayton (Venezuela) P Luisi	4	3
2	(Austria) A Haider-Maurer (Croatia) P Jelenić	6	6

Quarterfinals
(Russia) P Chekhov (Russia) V Rudnev	6	1	8
(United Kingdom) A Kennaugh (United Kingdom) A Murray	4	6	6
8	(Ukraine) S Bubka (France) J Chardy	6	6
2	(Austria) A Haider-Maurer (Croatia) P Jelenić	3	2

Semifinals
(Russia) P Chekhov (Russia) V Rudnev	4	6	1
8	(Ukraine) S Bubka (France) J Chardy	6	3	6

== Sources ==
- Draw
