= 2007 Movistar Open – Singles =

Singles
- 2007 Movistar Open

Final
- Champion: (Peru) Luis Horna
- Runner-up: (Chile) Nicolás Massú
- Score: 7–5, 6–3

Details
- Draw: 24 (2WC/3Q/1LL)
- Seeds: 8

Events
Singles	Doubles
- Chile Open

José Acasuso was the defending champion, but chose not to participate this year.

Luis Horna won the title, defeating Nicolás Massú in the final, 7–5, 6–3.

== Seeds ==
1. (Chile) Fernando González (quarterfinals)
2. (Argentina) Gastón Gaudio (round robin, withdrew because of a left thigh injury)
3. (Chile) Nicolás Massú (final)
4. (Spain) Rubén Ramírez Hidalgo (round robin)
5. (Peru) Luis Horna (champion)
6. (Argentina) Sergio Roitman (quarterfinals, retired because of an abductor injury)
7. (Spain) Albert Montañés (semifinals)
8. (Argentina) Martín Vassallo Argüello (semifinals)

== Draw ==
Key

- Q = Qualifier
- WC = Wild card
- LL = Lucky loser
- Alt = Alternate
- ITF = ITF entry
- PR = Protected ranking
- SR = Special ranking
- SE = Special exempt
- JE = Junior exempt
- JR = Junior Accelerator Programme entrant
- CO = College Accelerator Programme entrant
- NG = Next Gen Accelerator Program entrant
- w/o = Walkover
- r = Retired
- d = Defaulted

=== Finals ===
Quarterfinals
1	(Chile) Fernando González	3	6	4
7	(Spain) Albert Montañés	6	3	6
3	(Chile) Nicolás Massú	0	7^{7}	0
6	(Argentina) Sergio Roitman	6	6^{3}	0^{r}
5	(Peru) Luis Horna	6	6
(Russia) Igor Andreev	3	3
8	(Argentina) Martín Vassallo Argüello	3	6	7
(Argentina) Carlos Berlocq	6	3	5

Semifinals
7	(Spain) Albert Montañés	1	3
3	(Chile) Nicolás Massú	6	6
5	(Peru) Luis Horna	7	6
8	(Argentina) Martín Vassallo Argüello	5	4

Final
3	(Chile) Nicolás Massú	5	3
5	(Peru) Luis Horna	7	6

=== Round robin ===
	Group 1	(Chile) González	(Brazil) Alves	(France) Patience	RR W–L	Set W–L	Game W–L	Standings
1	(Chile) Fernando González		6–2, 6–2	5–7, 6–0, 6–4	2–0	4–1 (80.0%)	29–15 (65.9%)	1
	(Brazil) Thiago Alves	2–6, 2–6		2–6, 4–6	0–2	0–4 (0.0%)	10–24 (29.4%)	3
	(France) Olivier Patience	7–5, 0–6, 4–6	6–2, 6–4		1–1	3–2 (60.0%)	23–23 (50.0%)	2

	Group 2	(Spain) Montañés	(Spain) Hernández	(Brazil) Kuerten	RR W–L	Set W–L	Game W–L	Standings
7	(Spain) Albert Montañés		6–3, 7–5	6–1, 6–4	2–0	4–0 (100%)	25–13 (65.8%)	1
Q	(Spain) Óscar Hernández	3–6, 5–7		7–6^{(7–2)}, 7–6^{(7–3)}	1–1	2–2 (50.0%)	22–25 (46.8%)	2
WC	(Brazil) Gustavo Kuerten	1–6, 4–6	6–7^{(2–7)}, 6–7^{(3–7)}		0–2	0–4 (0.0%)	17–26 (39.5%)	3

	Group 3	(Chile) Massú	(Chile) Capdeville	(Spain) Fraile	RR W–L	Set W–L	Game W–L	Standings
3	(Chile) Nicolás Massú		6–4, 6–3	6–3, 6–2	2–0	4–0 (100%)	24–12 (66.7%)	1
WC	(Chile) Paul Capdeville	4–6, 3–6		7–6^{(7–3)}, 6–1	1–1	2–2 (50.0%)	20–19 (51.3%)	2
	(Spain) Gorka Fraile	3–6, 2–6	6–7^{(3–7)}, 1–6		0–2	0–4 (0.0%)	12–25 (32.4%)	3

	Group 4	(Argentina) Roitman	(Argentina) Guzmán	(Argentina) Zabaleta	RR W–L	Set W–L	Game W–L	Standings
6	(Argentina) Sergio Roitman		4–6, 6–4, 6–3	6–4, 6–4	2–0	4–1 (80.0%)	28–21 (57.1%)	1
Q	(Argentina) Juan Pablo Guzmán	6–4, 4–6, 3–6		3–6, 4–6	0–2	1–4 (20.0%)	20–28 (41.7%)	3
	(Argentina) Mariano Zabaleta	4–6, 4–6	6–3, 6–4		1–1	2–2 (50.0%)	20–19 (53.6%)	2

	Group 5	(Peru) Horna	(Brazil) Mello	(Italy) di Mauro	RR W–L	Set W–L	Game W–L	Standings
5	(Peru) Luis Horna		6–3, 6–1	6–1, 6–2	2–0	4–0 (100%)	24–7 (77.4%)	1
	(Brazil) Ricardo Mello	3–6, 1–6		6–0, 6–4	1–1	2–2 (50.0%)	16–16 (50.0%)	2
	(Italy) Alessio di Mauro	1–6, 2–6	0–6, 4–6		0–2	0–4 (0.0%)	7–24 (22.6%)	3

	Group 6	(Spain) Ramírez Hidalgo	(Argentina) Hartfield	(Russia) Andreev	RR W–L	Set W–L	Game W–L	Standings
4	(Spain) Rubén Ramírez Hidalgo		6–4, 6–1	6–7^{(3–7)}, 1–6	1–1	2–2 (50.0%)	19–18 (51.4%)	2
	(Argentina) Diego Hartfield	4–6, 1–6		3–6, 6–3, 4–6	0–2	1–4 (20.0%)	18–27 (40.0%)	3
	(Russia) Igor Andreev	7–6^{(7–3)}, 6–1	6–3, 3–6, 6–4		2–0	4–1 (80.0%)	28–20 (58.3%)	1

	Group 7	(Argentina) Vassallo Argüello	(Spain) Portas	(Serbia) Pašanski	RR W–L	Set W–L	Game W–L	Standings
8	(Argentina) Martín Vassallo Argüello		6–1, 6–1	7–6^{(7–2)}, 6–4	2–0	4–0 (100%)	25–12 (67.6%)	1
Q	(Spain) Albert Portas	1–6, 1–6		6–3, 6–3	1–1	2–2 (50.0%)	14–18 (43.8%)	2
	(Serbia) Boris Pašanski	6–7^{(2–7)}, 4–6	3–6, 3–6		0–2	0–4 (0.0%)	16–25 (39.0%)	3

	Group 8	(Argentina) Gaudio (Argentina) Junqueira	(Argentina) Berlocq	(Spain) Navarro Pastor	RR W–L	Set W–L	Game W–L	Standings
2 LL	(Argentina) Gastón Gaudio (Argentina) Diego Junqueira		2–6, 2–6 (w/ Gaudio)	3–6, 6–7^{(5–7)} (w/ Junqueira)	0–1; 0–1	0–2 (0.0%); 0–2 (0.0%)	4–12 (25.0%); 9–13 (40.9%)	X 3
	(Argentina) Carlos Berlocq	6–2, 6–2 (w/ Gaudio)		7–6^{(7–4)}, 6–2	2–0	4–0 (100%)	25–12 (67.6%)	1
	(Spain) Iván Navarro Pastor	6–3, 7–6^{(7–5)} (w/ Junqueira)	6–7^{(4–7)}, 2–6		1–1	2–2 (50.0%)	21–22 (48.8%)	2

== Qualifying ==
=== Seeds ===
1. (Spain) Albert Portas (qualified)
2. (Spain) Óscar Hernández (qualified)
3. (Brazil) Flávio Saretta (first round)
4. (Argentina) Juan Pablo Guzmán (qualified)
5. (Brazil) André Sá (first round)
6. (Argentina) Diego Junqueira (qualifying competition, lucky loser)

=== Qualifiers ===
1. (Spain) Albert Portas
2. (Spain) Óscar Hernández
3. (Argentina) Juan Pablo Guzmán

=== Lucky loser ===
1. (Argentina) Diego Junqueira

=== Qualifying draw ===
==== First qualifier ====
First round
1	(Spain) Albert Portas	6	6
WC	(Chile) Jorge Aguilar	4	1
(Brazil) André Ghem	4	6	6
5	(Brazil) André Sá	6	3	3

Qualifying competition
1	(Spain) Albert Portas	6	3	6
(Brazil) André Ghem	2	6	1

==== Second qualifier ====
First round
2	(Spain) Óscar Hernández	6	6
(Italy) Simone Vagnozzi	4	4
Alt	(Austria) Rainer Eitzinger	2	7^{7}	1
6	(Argentina) Diego Junqueira	6	6^{5}	6

Qualifying competition
2	(Spain) Óscar Hernández	6	6
6	(Argentina) Diego Junqueira	3	2

==== Third qualifier ====
First round
3	(Brazil) Flávio Saretta	4	6	5
(Spain) Marc López	6	1	7
(Costa Rica) Juan Antonio Marín	3	2
4	(Argentina) Juan Pablo Guzmán	6	6

Qualifying competition
(Spain) Marc López	6	0^{r}
4	(Argentina) Juan Pablo Guzmán	2	0
