= 2007 Movistar Open – Doubles =

Tennis tournament

Doubles
- 2007 Movistar Open

Final
- Champions: (Chile) Paul Capdeville (Spain) Óscar Hernández
- Runners-up: (Spain) Albert Montañés (Spain) Rubén Ramírez-Hidalgo
- Score: 4–6, 6–4, [10–6]

Events
Singles	Doubles
← 2006 ·	Movistar Open	· 2008 →

José Acasuso and Sebastián Prieto were the defending champions, but Acasuso did not participate this year. Prieto partnered Martín García, losing in the first round.

Paul Capdeville and Óscar Hernández won the title, defeating Albert Montañés and Rubén Ramírez-Hidalgo 4–6, 6–4, [10–6] in the final.

== Seeds ==
1. (Argentina) Martín García / (Argentina) Sebastián Prieto (first round)
2. (Peru) Luis Horna / (Argentina) Sergio Roitman (first round)
3. (Brazil) Marcelo Melo / (Brazil) André Sá (semifinals)
4. (Uruguay) Pablo Cuevas / (Chile) Adrián García (first round, García withdrew because of a back injury)

== Draw ==
=== Key ===
- Q = Qualifier
- WC = Wild card
- LL = Lucky loser
- Alt = Alternate
- SE = Special exempt
- PR = Protected ranking
- ITF = ITF entry
- JE = Junior exempt
- w/o = Walkover
- r = Retired
- d = Defaulted
- SR = Special ranking

=== Draw ===
First round
1	(Argentina) M García (Argentina) S Prieto	4	7	[9]
(Spain) A Montañés (Spain) R Ramírez-Hidalgo	6	5	[11]
Alt	(Brazil) A Ghem (Costa Rica) JI Marín	6^{3}	6	[10]
WC	(Chile) G Hormazábal (Chile) H Podlipink	7^{7}	4	[8]
4	(Uruguay) P Cuevas (Chile) A García
(Argentina) C Berlocq (Argentina) M Vassallo Argüello	w/o
(Brazil) R Mello (Serbia) B Pašanski	6^{4}	1
(Spain) G Fraile (Spain) I Navarro Pastor	7^{7}	6
(Argentina) D Junqueira (France) O Patience	7^{7}	2	[7]
(Spain) A Portas (Italy) A di Mauro	6^{4}	6	[10]
WC	(Brazil) G Kuerten (Brazil) F Saretta	2	3
3	(Brazil) M Melo (Brazil) A Sá	6	6
(Argentina) M González (Argentina) D Hartfield	6^{2}	4
(Chile) P Capdeville (Spain) Ó Hernández	7^{7}	6
(Argentina) JP Guzmán (Argentina) M Zabaleta	6	7^{7}
2	(Peru) L Horna (Argentina) S Roitman	4	6^{1}

Quarterfinals
(Spain) A Montañés (Spain) R Ramírez-Hidalgo	6	6
(Brazil) A Ghem (Costa Rica) JI Marín	2	3
(Argentina) C Berlocq (Argentina) M Vassallo Argüello	7	6
(Spain) G Fraile (Spain) I Navarro Pastor	5	2
(Spain) A Portas (Italy) A di Mauro	2	6	[6]
3	(Brazil) M Melo (Brazil) A Sá	6	2	[10]
(Chile) P Capdeville (Spain) Ó Hernández	6	6
(Argentina) JP Guzmán (Argentina) M Zabaleta	3	2

Semifinals
(Spain) A Montañés (Spain) R Ramírez-Hidalgo	4	6	[10]
(Argentina) C Berlocq (Argentina) M Vassallo Argüello	6	4	[8]
3	(Brazil) M Melo (Brazil) A Sá	6	5	[9]
(Chile) P Capdeville (Spain) Ó Hernández	1	7	[11]

Final
(Spain) A Montañés (Spain) R Ramírez-Hidalgo	6	4	[6]
(Chile) P Capdeville (Spain) Ó Hernández	4	6	[10]
