= 2009 Movistar Open – Doubles =

Doubles
- 2009 Movistar Open

Final
- Champions: (Uruguay) Pablo Cuevas (Argentina) Brian Dabul
- Runners-up: (Czech Republic) František Čermák (Slovakia) Michal Mertiňák
- Score: 6–3, 6–3

Events
Singles	Doubles
← 2008 ·	Movistar Open	· 2010 →

José Acasuso and Sebastián Prieto were the defending champions, but lost in the first round to Lucas Arnold Ker and Juan Mónaco.

Pablo Cuevas and Brian Dabul won in the final, 6–3, 6–3, over František Čermák and Michal Mertiňák.

== Seeds ==
1. (Czech Republic) František Čermák / (Slovakia) Michal Mertiňák (final)
2. (Argentina) Lucas Arnold Ker / (Argentina) Juan Mónaco (quarterfinals)
3. (Uruguay) Pablo Cuevas / (Argentina) Brian Dabul (champions)
4. (Spain) Alberto Martín / (Spain) Tommy Robredo (semifinals)

== Draw ==
=== Key ===
- Q = Qualifier
- WC = Wild card
- LL = Lucky loser
- Alt = Alternate
- SE = Special exempt
- PR = Protected ranking
- ITF = ITF entry
- JE = Junior exempt
- w/o = Walkover
- r = Retired
- d = Defaulted
- SR = Special ranking

=== Draw ===
First round
1	(Czech Republic) F Čermák (Slovakia) M Mertiňák	6	6
(France) N Devilder (Austria) O Marach	3	2
(Argentina) A Calleri (Italy) P Starace	6	3	[10]
(Argentina) M González (Ecuador) N Lapentti	3	6	[7]
4	(Spain) A Martín (Spain) T Robredo	7^{7}	7^{7}
(Sweden) J Brunström (Netherlands Antilles) J-J Rojer	6^{1}	6^{2}
(Spain) P Andújar (Spain) D Gimeno-Traver	7^{7}	7
WC	(Chile) F González (Chile) H Podlipnik-Castillo	6^{2}	5
(Argentina) D Junqueira (Argentina) E Schwank	6	5	[4]
WC	(Chile) P Capdeville (Chile) A García	4	7	[10]
(Brazil) T Bellucci (Argentina) M Vassallo Argüello	3	6	[6]
3	(Uruguay) P Cuevas (Argentina) B Dabul	6	3	[10]
(Spain) Ó Hernández (Spain) A Montañés	6	6
(Argentina) JP Guzmán (Spain) D Munoz-de la Nava	3	3
(Argentina) J Acasuso (Argentina) S Prieto	1	6^{7}
2	(Argentina) L Arnold Ker (Argentina) J Mónaco	6	7^{9}

Quarterfinals
1	(Czech Republic) F Čermák (Slovakia) M Mertiňák	6	6
(Argentina) A Calleri (Italy) P Starace	3	2
4	(Spain) A Martín (Spain) T Robredo	6	7^{7}
(Spain) P Andújar (Spain) D Gimeno-Traver	4	6^{4}
WC	(Chile) P Capdeville (Chile) A García	2	3
3	(Uruguay) P Cuevas (Argentina) B Dabul	6	6
(Spain) Ó Hernández (Spain) A Montañés	7	7^{7}
2	(Argentina) L Arnold Ker (Argentina) J Mónaco	5	6^{2}

Semifinals
1	(Czech Republic) F Čermák (Slovakia) M Mertiňák	6	7^{7}
4	(Spain) A Martín (Spain) T Robredo	2	6^{5}
3	(Uruguay) P Cuevas (Argentina) B Dabul	7	6
(Spain) Ó Hernández (Spain) A Montañés	5	3

Final
1	(Czech Republic) F Čermák (Slovakia) M Mertiňák	3	3
3	(Uruguay) P Cuevas (Argentina) B Dabul	6	6
