= 2010 Movistar Open – Doubles =

Doubles
- 2010 Movistar Open

Final
- Champion: (Poland) Łukasz Kubot (Austria) Oliver Marach
- Runner-up: (Italy) Potito Starace (Argentina) Horacio Zeballos
- Score: 6–4, 6–0

Events
Singles	Doubles
← 2009 ·	Movistar Open	· 2011 →

Pablo Cuevas and Brian Dabul were the defending champions. Both are present, but chose not compete together this year.

Cuevas partnered up with Marcel Granollers, but they lost in the first round 2–6, 2–6, against Potito Starace and Horacio Zeballos. Dabul partnered up with Paolo Lorenzi, but they lost in the first round 1–6, 4–6, against Santiago González and Nicolás Massú.

The champions of this edition were Łukasz Kubot and Oliver Marach, who defeated in the final Potito Starace and Horacio Zeballos 6–4, 6–0.

== Seeds ==
1. (Poland) Łukasz Kubot / (Austria) Oliver Marach (champions)
2. (Brazil) Marcelo Melo / (Brazil) Bruno Soares (quarterfinals)
3. (Uruguay) Pablo Cuevas / (Spain) Marcel Granollers (first round)
4. (Brazil) André Sá / (Romania) Horia Tecău (first round)

== Draw ==
=== Key ===
- Q = Qualifier
- WC = Wild card
- LL = Lucky loser
- Alt = Alternate
- SE = Special exempt
- PR = Protected ranking
- ITF = ITF entry
- JE = Junior exempt
- w/o = Walkover
- r = Retired
- d = Defaulted
- SR = Special ranking

=== Draw ===
First round
1	(Poland) Ł Kubot (Austria) O Marach	6	7^{9}
(Argentina) JI Chela (Spain) S Ventura	3	6^{7}
(Argentina) B Dabul (Italy) P Lorenzi	1	4
WC	(Mexico) S González (Chile) N Massú	6	6
4	(Brazil) A Sá (Romania) H Tecău	1	2
(Argentina) J Acasuso (Argentina) S Prieto	6	6
(Czech Republic) L Friedl (Czech Republic) D Škoch	6	7^{7}
(Brazil) T Bellucci (Brazil) M Daniel	4	6^{4}
(Germany) S Greul (Australia) P Luczak	7^{7}	6
(Spain) R Ramírez Hidalgo (Argentina) E Schwank	6^{3}	4
(Italy) P Starace (Argentina) H Zeballos	6	6
3	(Uruguay) P Cuevas (Spain) M Granollers	2	2
(Argentina) L Arnold Ker (Argentina) J Mónaco	6	6
(Spain) Ó Hernández (Ecuador) N Lapentti	3	2
WC	(Chile) J Aguilar (Chile) H Podlipnik-Castillo	1	6^{4}
2	(Brazil) M Melo (Brazil) B Soares	6	7^{7}

Quarterfinals
1	(Poland) Ł Kubot (Austria) O Marach	4	6	[10]
WC	(Mexico) S González (Chile) N Massú	6	3	[6]
(Argentina) J Acasuso (Argentina) S Prieto
(Czech Republic) L Friedl (Czech Republic) D Škoch	w/o
(Germany) S Greul (Australia) P Luczak	5	4
(Italy) P Starace (Argentina) H Zeballos	7	6
(Argentina) L Arnold Ker (Argentina) J Mónaco	6	6
2	(Brazil) M Melo (Brazil) B Soares	4	3

Semifinals
1	(Poland) Ł Kubot (Austria) O Marach	5	6	[10]
(Czech Republic) L Friedl (Czech Republic) D Škoch	7	2	[8]
(Italy) P Starace (Argentina) H Zeballos	6	4	[10]
(Argentina) L Arnold Ker (Argentina) J Mónaco	4	6	[5]

Finals
1	(Poland) Ł Kubot (Austria) O Marach	6	6
(Italy) P Starace (Argentina) H Zeballos	4	0
