= 2010 Movistar Open =

- Date: 1–7 February
- Edition: 17th
- Category: World Tour 250
- Draw: 32S / 16D
- Prize money: USD398,250
- Surface: Clay (red)
- Location: Colina, Chile
- Venue: Club Piedra Roja, Chicureo

Champions

Singles
- (Brazil) Thomaz Bellucci

Doubles
- (Poland) Łukasz Kubot / (Austria) Oliver Marach
- Chile Open

The 2010 Movistar Open was a men's tennis tournament played on outdoor clay courts. It was the 16th edition of the Chile Open, and was part of the ATP World Tour 250 series of the 2010 ATP World Tour. It took place in Chicureo at the Santiago's commune of Colina from 1 February through 7 February 2010. Third-seeded Thomaz Bellucci won the singles title.

== ATP entrants ==
=== Seeds ===
| Country | Player | Rank^{1} | Seed |
|---|---|---|---|
| CHI | Fernando González | 11 | 1 |
| ARG | Juan Mónaco | 33 | 2 |
| BRA | Thomaz Bellucci | 35 | 3 |
| URU | Pablo Cuevas | 48 | 4 |
| ARG | Horacio Zeballos | 50 | 5 |
| ARG | José Acasuso | 51 | 6 |
| GER | Simon Greul | 61 | 7 |
| ITA | Potito Starace | 63 | 8 |

- Rankings are as of January 18, 2010

=== Other entrants ===
The following players received wildcards into the singles main draw:

- (Chile) Jorge Aguilar
- (Chile) Hans Podlipnik-Castillo
- (Chile) Cristóbal Saavedra-Corvalán

The following players received entry from the qualifying draw:

- (Argentina) Juan-Martín Aranguren
- (Spain) David Marrero
- (Spain) Rubén Ramírez Hidalgo
- (Brazil) João Souza

== Finals ==
=== Singles ===
(Brazil) Thomaz Bellucci defeated (Argentina) Juan Mónaco, 6–2, 0–6, 6–4

- It was Bellucci's first title of the year and second of his career.

=== Doubles ===
(Poland) Łukasz Kubot/ (Austria) Oliver Marach defeated (Italy) Potito Starace / (Argentina) Horacio Zeballos, 6–4, 6–0.
