= 2008 Movistar Open – Doubles =

Doubles
- 2008 Movistar Open

Final
- Champions: (Argentina) José Acasuso (Argentina) Sebastián Prieto
- Runners-up: (Argentina) Máximo González (Argentina) Juan Mónaco
- Score: 6–1, 3–0 retired

Events
Singles	Doubles
← 2007 ·	Movistar Open	· 2009 →

Paul Capdeville and Óscar Hernández were the defending champions. They were both present but did not compete together.
Capdeville partnered with Lucas Arnold Ker, but lost in the first round to José Acasuso and Sebastián Prieto.
Hernandez partnered with Sergio Roitman, but lost in the first round to Juan Pablo Brzezicki and Ross Hutchins.

José Acasuso and Sebastián Prieto won in the final 6–1, 3–0, after Máximo González and Juan Mónaco retired due to a left ankle injury for Monaco.

== Seeds ==
1. (Brazil) Marcelo Melo / (Brazil) André Sá (first round)
2. (Uruguay) Pablo Cuevas / (Argentina) Martín García (first round)
3. (Spain) Marcel Granollers-Pujol / (Spain) Santiago Ventura (first round)
4. (Argentina) José Acasuso / (Argentina) Sebastián Prieto (champions)

== Draw ==
=== Key ===
- Q = Qualifier
- WC = Wild card
- LL = Lucky loser
- Alt = Alternate
- SE = Special exempt
- PR = Protected ranking
- ITF = ITF entry
- JE = Junior exempt
- w/o = Walkover
- r = Retired
- d = Defaulted
- SR = Special ranking

=== Draw ===
First round
1	(Brazil) M Melo (Brazil) A Sá	6^{2}	3
WC	(Chile) A García (Spain) R Ramírez Hidalgo	7^{7}	6
(Argentina) C Berlocq (Argentina) M Vassallo Argüello	3	7^{7}	[11]
(Argentina) JI Chela (Chile) F González	6	6^{5}	[9]
3	(Spain) M Granollers-Pujol (Spain) S Ventura	6^{5}	3
(Argentina) A Calleri (Peru) L Horna	7^{7}	6
(Argentina) M González (Argentina) J Mónaco	6	4	[10]
(United States) H Armando (Argentina) H Zeballos	2	6	[7]
(Spain) Ó Hernández (Argentina) S Roitman	6^{6}	7^{7}	[2]
(Argentina) JP Brzezicki (United Kingdom) R Hutchins	7^{8}	6^{2}	[10]
WC	(Argentina) L Arnold Ker (Chile) P Capdeville	2	1
4	(Argentina) J Acasuso (Argentina) S Prieto	6	6
(Australia) P Luczak (Serbia) B Pašanski	3	6	[2]
(Italy) F Fognini (Argentina) D Hartfield	6	4	[10]
(Ecuador) N Lapentti (United Kingdom) J Murray	6	6^{4}	[11]
2	(Uruguay) P Cuevas (Argentina) M García	3	7^{7}	[9]

Quarterfinals
WC	(Chile) A García (Spain) R Ramírez Hidalgo	6	6
(Argentina) C Berlocq (Argentina) M Vassallo Argüello	1	3
(Argentina) A Calleri (Peru) L Horna
(Argentina) M González (Argentina) J Mónaco	w/o
(Argentina) JP Brzezicki (United Kingdom) R Hutchins	7	3	[5]
4	(Argentina) J Acasuso (Argentina) S Prieto	5	6	[10]
(Italy) F Fognini (Argentina) D Hartfield	6	3	[9]
(Ecuador) N Lapentti (United Kingdom) J Murray	4	6	[11]

Semifinals
WC	(Chile) A García (Spain) R Ramírez Hidalgo	3	4
(Argentina) M González (Argentina) J Mónaco	6	6
4	(Argentina) J Acasuso (Argentina) S Prieto	6	7^{7}
(Ecuador) N Lapentti (United Kingdom) J Murray	4	6^{5}

Final
(Argentina) M González (Argentina) J Mónaco	1	0^{r}
4	(Argentina) J Acasuso (Argentina) S Prieto	6	3
