= 2004 Mercedes Cup – Singles =

Singles
- 2004 Mercedes Cup

Final
- Champion: (Argentina) Guillermo Cañas
- Runner-up: (Argentina) Gastón Gaudio
- Score: 5–7, 6–2, 6–0, 1–6, 6–3

Details
- Draw: 48
- Seeds: 16

Events
Singles	Doubles
- Stuttgart Open

Guillermo Coria was the defending champion, but did not participate.

Unseeded Guillermo Cañas won the title, defeating Gastón Gaudio 5–7, 6–2, 6–0, 1–6, 6–3 in the final.

== Seeds ==
All seeds receive a bye into the second round.

1. (Germany) Rainer Schüttler (second round)
2. (Argentina) Gastón Gaudio (final)
3. (Argentina) Juan Ignacio Chela (third round)
4. (Romania) Andrei Pavel (third round)
5. (Czech Republic) Jiří Novák (quarterfinals)
6. (Spain) Tommy Robredo (second round)
7. (Spain) Feliciano López (second round)
8. (Argentina) Mariano Zabaleta (third round)
9. (Germany) Florian Mayer (second round)
10. (Russia) Mikhail Youzhny (third round)
11. (Spain) David Ferrer (semifinals)
12. (Spain) Albert Costa (quarterfinals)
13. (Croatia) Ivo Karlović (third round)
14. (Spain) Rafael Nadal (quarterfinals)
15. (Russia) Nikolay Davydenko (semifinals)
16. (Czech Republic) Tomáš Berdych (third round)

== Draw ==
Key

- Q = Qualifier
- WC = Wild card
- LL = Lucky loser
- Alt = Alternate
- ITF = ITF entry
- PR = Protected ranking
- SR = Special ranking
- SE = Special exempt
- JE = Junior exempt
- JR = Junior Accelerator Programme entrant
- CO = College Accelerator Programme entrant
- NG = Next Gen Accelerator Program entrant
- w/o = Walkover
- r = Retired
- d = Defaulted

=== Finals ===
Quarterfinals
(Czech Republic) Radek Štěpánek	4	4
(Argentina) Guillermo Cañas	6	6
15	(Russia) Nikolay Davydenko	6	6
12	(Spain) Albert Costa	3	4
11	(Spain) David Ferrer	6	6^{3}	7
14	(Spain) Rafael Nadal	3	7^{7}	5
5	(Czech Republic) Jiří Novák	4	3
2	(Argentina) Gastón Gaudio	6	6

Semifinals
(Argentina) Guillermo Cañas	3	6	6
15	(Russia) Nikolay Davydenko	6	1	2
11	(Spain) David Ferrer	3	7	4
2	(Argentina) Gastón Gaudio	6	5	6

Final
(Argentina) Guillermo Cañas	5	6	6	1	6
2	(Argentina) Gastón Gaudio	7	2	0	6	3

=== Top half ===
==== Section 1 ====
First round
(Argentina) JP Guzmán	6^{4}	3
(Czech Republic) R Štěpánek	7^{7}	6
Q	(Argentina) F Squillari	6	7^{7}
(Spain) N Almagro	3	6^{1}
(Belgium) D Norman	0	5
(Argentina) G Cañas	6	7
(Austria) S Koubek	6	7^{7}
(France) O Patience	2	6^{5}

Second round
1	(Germany) R Schüttler	7^{8}	3	2
(Czech Republic) R Štěpánek	6^{6}	6	6
Q	(Argentina) F Squillari	3	6^{0}
13	(Croatia) I Karlović	6	7^{7}
9	(Germany) F Mayer	7^{7}	6^{5}	4
(Argentina) G Cañas	6^{3}	7^{7}	6
(Austria) S Koubek	6	6
7	(Spain) F López	3	4

Third round
(Czech Republic) R Štěpánek	6	7
13	(Croatia) I Karlović	2	5
(Argentina) G Cañas	6	6
(Austria) S Koubek	4	2

Quarterfinals
(Czech Republic) R Štěpánek	4	4
(Argentina) G Cañas	6	6

==== Section 2 ====
First round
(Romania) V Hănescu	6^{3}	1^{r}
(Czech Republic) B Ulihrach	7^{7}	4
WC	(Germany) A Beck	7^{7}	6
(Austria) A Peya	6^{2}	1
(Spain) F Mantilla	6^{1}	6	6
Q	(France) J Haehnel	7^{7}	2	2
(Spain) M López	6	6^{5}	6
WC	(Germany) D Elsner	1	7^{7}	3

Second round
4	(Romania) A Pavel	6	6
(Czech Republic) B Ulihrach	1	1
WC	(Germany) A Beck	3	3
15	(Russia) N Davydenko	6	6
12	(Spain) A Costa	7	6
(Spain) F Mantilla	5	4
(Spain) M López	6^{2}	2
8	(Argentina) M Zabaleta	7^{7}	6

Third round
4	(Romania) A Pavel	5	6	4
15	(Russia) N Davydenko	7	1	6
12	(Spain) A Costa	7	7^{7}
8	(Argentina) M Zabaleta	5	6^{4}

Quarterfinals
15	(Russia) N Davydenko	6	6
12	(Spain) A Costa	3	4

=== Bottom half ===
==== Section 3 ====
First round
Q	(France) R Gasquet	6	6
LL	(France) É Roger-Vasselin	2	4
(France) A Di Pasquale	6	6
(Spain) G Blanco	3	1
Q	(Germany) P Kohlschreiber	3	6	2
(Argentina) M Vassallo Argüello	6	3	6
Q	(Norway) JF Andersen	6	6
(Germany) L Burgsmüller	4	2

Second round
6	(Spain) T Robredo	1	4
Q	(France) R Gasquet	6	6
(France) A Di Pasquale	4	6	1
11	(Spain) D Ferrer	6	1	6
14	(Spain) R Nadal	7^{7}	6
(Argentina) M Vassallo Argüello	6^{4}	4
Q	(Norway) JF Andersen	3	1
3	(Argentina) JI Chela	6	6

Third round
Q	(France) R Gasquet	4	2
11	(Spain) D Ferrer	6	6
14	(Spain) R Nadal	6	6
3	(Argentina) JI Chela	2	3

Quarterfinals
11	(Spain) D Ferrer	6	6^{3}	7
14	(Spain) R Nadal	3	7^{7}	5

==== Section 4 ====
First round
(France) T Ascione	6	7^{10}
(Czech Republic) T Zíb	3	6^{8}
WC	(Germany) A Waske	2	6	1
(Germany) A Popp	6	1	6
LL	(Germany) B Phau	6	6
(Switzerland) I Heuberger	3	2
Q	(United States) H Armando	6	6
WC	(Germany) S Rieschick	1	4

Second round
5	(Czech Republic) J Novák	6	6
(France) T Ascione	2	4
(Germany) A Popp	3	6^{7}
10	(Russia) M Youzhny	6	7^{9}
16	(Czech Republic) T Berdych	6	6
LL	(Germany) B Phau	2	3
Q	(United States) H Armando	6	2	6^{5}
2	(Argentina) G Gaudio	3	6	7^{7}

Third round
5	(Czech Republic) J Novák	7^{7}	4	6
10	(Russia) M Youzhny	6^{4}	6	1
16	(Czech Republic) T Berdych	2	4
2	(Argentina) G Gaudio	6	6

Quarterfinals
5	(Czech Republic) J Novák	4	3
2	(Argentina) G Gaudio	6	6
