= 2004 Mercedes Cup =

German tennis tournament

- Date: 12–18 July
- Edition: 56th
- Category: International Series Gold
- Draw: 48S / 16D
- Prize money: $590,000
- Surface: Clay / outdoor
- Location: Stuttgart, Germany
- Venue: Tennis Club Weissenhof

Champions

Singles
- (Argentina) Guillermo Cañas

Doubles
- (Czech Republic) Jiří Novák / (Czech Republic) Radek Štěpánek
- Stuttgart Open

The 2004 Mercedes Cup was a men's tennis tournament played on outdoor clay courts at the Tennis Club Weissenhof in Stuttgart, Germany and was part of the International Series Gold of the 2004 ATP Tour. The tournament ran from 12 July until 18 July 2004. Unseeded Guillermo Cañas won the singles title.

== Finals ==
=== Singles ===
(Argentina) Guillermo Cañas defeated (Argentina) Gastón Gaudio 5–7, 6–2, 6–0, 1–6, 6–3

- It was Cañas' 1st title of the year and the 4th of his career.

=== Doubles ===
(Czech Republic) Jiří Novák / (Czech Republic) Radek Štěpánek defeated (Sweden) Simon Aspelin / (Australia) Todd Perry 6–2, 6–4

- It was Novák's 1st title of the year and the 16th of his career. It was Štěpánek's 2nd title of the year and the 8th of his career.
