= 2003 MercedesCup – Doubles =

Doubles
- 2003 MercedesCup
- 2002 Champion: (Australia) Joshua Eagle (Czech Republic) David Rikl

Final
- Champion: (Czech Republic) Tomáš Cibulec (Czech Republic) Pavel Vízner
- Runner-up: (Russia) Yevgeny Kafelnikov (Zimbabwe) Kevin Ullyett
- Score: 3–6, 6–3, 6–4

Details
- Draw: 16
- Seeds: 4

Events
Singles	Doubles
← 2002 ·	Stuttgart Open	· 2004 →

Joshua Eagle and David Rikl were the defending champions but did not compete that year.

Tomáš Cibulec and Pavel Vízner won in the final 3–6, 6–3, 6–4 against Yevgeny Kafelnikov and Kevin Ullyett.

== Seeds ==
Champion seeds are indicated in bold text while text in italics indicates the round in which those seeds were eliminated.

1. (Belarus) Max Mirnyi / (United States) Jared Palmer (semifinals)
2. (Czech Republic) Martin Damm / (Czech Republic) Cyril Suk (semifinals)
3. (Russia) Yevgeny Kafelnikov / (Zimbabwe) Kevin Ullyett (final)
4. (Argentina) Gastón Etlis / (Argentina) Martín Rodríguez (first round)

== Draw ==
=== Key ===
- Q = Qualifier
- WC = Wild card
- LL = Lucky loser
- Alt = Alternate
- SE = Special exempt
- PR = Protected ranking
- ITF = ITF entry
- JE = Junior exempt
- w/o = Walkover
- r = Retired
- d = Defaulted
- SR = Special ranking

First round
1	(Belarus) **M Mirnyi** (United States) **J Palmer**	**7**	**6**
(Ecuador) N Lapentti (Argentina) M Zabaleta	5	1
(South Africa) R Koenig (South Africa) M Wakefield	2	2
(Germany) **T Behrend** (Argentina) **G Coria**	**6**	**6**
3	(Russia) **Y Kafelnikov** (Zimbabwe) **K Ullyett**	**6**	4	**6**
WC	(Germany) A Beck (Spain) R Nadal	3	**6**	3
(Czech Republic) **J Novák** (Czech Republic) **P Pála**	**7**	4	**6**
(Australia) T Perry (Japan) T Shimada	5	**6**	4
(Finland) **J Nieminen** (Belgium) **O Rochus**	6^{2}	**6**	**6**
WC	(Germany) K Braasch (Germany) L Burgsmüller	**7^{7}**	4	3
(Czech Republic) **T Cibulec** (Czech Republic) **P Vízner**	6^{6}	**6**	**6**
4	(Argentina) G Etlis (Argentina) M Rodríguez	**7^{8}**	4	3
(Spain) **À Corretja** (Spain) **A Costa**	**7**	**6**
(Germany) R Schüttler (Russia) M Youzhny	5	4
(Czech Republic) F Čermák (Czech Republic) L Friedl	**6**	4	1
2	(Czech Republic) **M Damm** (Czech Republic) **C Suk**	4	**6**	**6**

Quarterfinals
1	(Belarus) **M Mirnyi** (United States) **J Palmer**	**6**	**6**
(Germany) T Behrend (Argentina) G Coria	1	4
3	(Russia) **Y Kafelnikov** (Zimbabwe) **K Ullyett**	**6**	**6**
(Czech Republic) J Novák (Czech Republic) P Pála	2	3
(Finland) J Nieminen (Belgium) O Rochus	**6**	4	3
(Czech Republic) **T Cibulec** (Czech Republic) **P Vízner**	2	**6**	**6**
(Spain) À Corretja (Spain) A Costa	6^{3}	**6**	3
2	(Czech Republic) **M Damm** (Czech Republic) **C Suk**	**7^{7}**	4	**6**

Semifinals
1	(Belarus) M Mirnyi (United States) J Palmer	4	6^{6}
3	(Russia) **Y Kafelnikov** (Zimbabwe) **K Ullyett**	**6**	**7^{8}**
(Czech Republic) **T Cibulec** (Czech Republic) **P Vízner**	**6**	**6**
2	(Czech Republic) M Damm (Czech Republic) C Suk	0	2

Final
3	(Russia) Yevgeny Kafelnikov (Zimbabwe) Kevin Ullyett	**6**	3	4
(Czech Republic) **Tomáš Cibulec** (Czech Republic) **Pavel Vízner**	3	**6**	**6**
