= 2005 Mercedes Cup – Doubles =

Doubles
- 2005 Mercedes Cup

Final
- Champions: (Argentina) José Acasuso (Argentina) Sebastián Prieto
- Runners-up: (Argentina) Mariano Hood (Spain) Tommy Robredo
- Score: 7–6^{(7–4)}, 6–3

Details
- Draw: 16
- Seeds: 4

Events
Singles	Doubles
← 2004 ·	Stuttgart Open	· 2006 →

Jiří Novák and Radek Štěpánek were the defending champions, but Štěpánek did not compete this year. Novák teamed up with Petr Pála and lost in the first round to František Čermák and Leoš Friedl.

José Acasuso and Sebastián Prieto won the title by defeating Mariano Hood and Tommy Robredo 7–6^{(7–4)}, 6–3 in the final.

== Seeds ==
1. (India) Mahesh Bhupathi / (Czech Republic) Martin Damm (quarterfinals)
2. (Czech Republic) František Čermák / (Czech Republic) Leoš Friedl (quarterfinals, withdrew due to a thumb injury on Čermák)
3. (Czech Republic) Cyril Suk / (Czech Republic) Pavel Vízner (quarterfinals)
4. (Austria) Julian Knowle / (Austria) Jürgen Melzer (quarterfinals)

== Draw ==
=== Key ===
- Q = Qualifier
- WC = Wild card
- LL = Lucky loser
- Alt = Alternate
- SE = Special exempt
- PR = Protected ranking
- ITF = ITF entry
- JE = Junior exempt
- w/o = Walkover
- r = Retired
- d = Defaulted
- SR = Special ranking

=== Draw ===
First round
1	(India) M Bhupathi (Czech Republic) M Damm	1	6	7^{10}
WC	(Germany) L Burgsmüller (Germany) F Mayer	6	1	6^{8}
(Czech Republic) T Berdych (Czech Republic) J Levinský	4	7	6^{4}
WC	(Germany) A Beck (Germany) S Rieschick	6	5	7^{7}
4	(Austria) J Knowle (Austria) J Melzer	2	6	6
(Switzerland) Y Allegro (Belgium) O Rochus	6	0	3
(Italy) M Bertolini (Italy) U Vico	5	2
(Argentina) J Acasuso (Argentina) S Prieto	7	6
(Germany) R Schüttler (Russia) M Youhzny	3	4
(Spain) R Nadal (Spain) F Verdasco	6	6
(Russia) I Andreev (Spain) A Martín	6	4	3
3	(Czech Republic) C Suk (Czech Republic) P Vízner	3	6	6
(Argentina) M Hood (Spain) T Robredo	6^{2}	7^{8}	6
(Germany) P Kohlschreiber (Germany) A Waske	7^{7}	6^{6}	4
(Czech Republic) J Novák (Czech Republic) P Pála	7	0	6^{5}
2	(Czech Republic) F Čermák (Czech Republic) L Friedl	5	6	7^{7}

Quarterfinals
1	(India) M Bhupathi (Czech Republic) M Damm	4	0
WC	(Germany) A Beck (Germany) S Rieschick	6	6
4	(Austria) J Knowle (Austria) J Melzer	6^{6}	5
(Argentina) J Acasuso (Argentina) S Prieto	7^{8}	7
(Spain) R Nadal (Spain) F Verdasco	7	7^{7}
3	(Czech Republic) C Suk (Czech Republic) P Vízner	5	6^{5}
(Argentina) M Hood (Spain) T Robredo	w/o
2	(Czech Republic) F Čermák (Czech Republic) L Friedl

Semifinals
WC	(Germany) A Beck (Germany) S Rieschick	3	3
(Argentina) J Acasuso (Argentina) S Prieto	6	6
(Spain) R Nadal (Spain) F Verdasco	2	3
(Argentina) M Hood (Spain) T Robredo	6	6

Final
(Argentina) J Acasuso (Argentina) S Prieto	7^{7}	6
(Argentina) M Hood (Spain) T Robredo	6^{4}	3
