= 2004 Mercedes Cup – Doubles =

Doubles
- 2004 Mercedes Cup

Final
- Champions: (Czech Republic) Jiří Novák (Czech Republic) Radek Štěpánek
- Runners-up: (Sweden) Simon Aspelin (Australia) Todd Perry
- Score: 6–2, 6–4

Details
- Draw: 16
- Seeds: 4

Events
Singles	Doubles
← 2003 ·	Stuttgart Open	· 2005 →

Tomáš Cibulec and Pavel Vízner were the defending champions, but competed this year with different partners. Cibulec teamed up with Petr Pála and lost in the first round to Guillermo Cañas and Feliciano López, while Vízner teamed up with Jared Palmer and lost in the first round to Simon Aspelin and Todd Perry.

Jiří Novák and Radek Štěpánek won the title by defeating Simon Aspelin and Todd Perry 6–2, 6–4 in the final.

== Seeds ==
1. (Czech Republic) Martin Damm / (Czech Republic) Cyril Suk (quarterfinals)
2. (United States) Jared Palmer / (Czech Republic) Pavel Vízner (first round)
3. (Czech Republic) František Čermák / (Czech Republic) Leoš Friedl (first round)
4. (India) Leander Paes / (Czech Republic) David Rikl (first round, retired due to a back injury on Rikl)

== Draw ==
=== Key ===
- Q = Qualifier
- WC = Wild card
- LL = Lucky loser
- Alt = Alternate
- SE = Special exempt
- PR = Protected ranking
- ITF = ITF entry
- JE = Junior exempt
- w/o = Walkover
- r = Retired
- d = Defaulted
- SR = Special ranking

=== Draw ===
First round
1	(Czech Republic) M Damm (Czech Republic) C Suk	7^{7}	5	6
WC	(Germany) L Burgsmüller (Germany) F Mayer	6^{5}	7	1
WC	(Germany) K Braasch (Germany) M Zverev	2	0
(Argentina) L Arnold Ker (Argentina) M García	6	6
3	(Czech Republic) F Čermák (Czech Republic) L Friedl	6^{2}	3
(Czech Republic) J Novák (Czech Republic) R Štěpánek	7^{7}	6
(Argentina) G Cañas (Spain) F López	7^{8}	7
(Czech Republic) T Cibulec (Czech Republic) P Pála	6^{6}	5
(Austria) J Knowle (Romania) A Pavel	0	r
(Spain) R Nadal (Spain) T Robredo	3
(Germany) R Schüttler (Russia) M Youzhny	5
4	(India) L Paes (Czech Republic) D Rikl	3	r
(Switzerland) Y Allegro (Germany) M Kohlmann	7^{7}	4	3
(Argentina) M Hood (Argentina) S Prieto	6^{3}	6	6
(Sweden) S Aspelin (Australia) T Perry	6	3	7^{7}
2	(United States) J Palmer (Czech Republic) P Vízner	3	6	6^{4}

Quarterfinals
1	(Czech Republic) M Damm (Czech Republic) C Suk	6	2	2
(Argentina) L Arnold Ker (Argentina) M García	3	6	6
(Czech Republic) J Novák (Czech Republic) R Štěpánek	6	6
(Argentina) G Cañas (Spain) F López	3	3
(Spain) R Nadal (Spain) T Robredo	3	4
(Germany) R Schüttler (Russia) M Youzhny	6	6
(Argentina) M Hood (Argentina) S Prieto	5	6	2
(Sweden) S Aspelin (Australia) T Perry	7	4	6

Semifinals
(Argentina) L Arnold Ker (Argentina) M García	2	3
(Czech Republic) J Novák (Czech Republic) R Štěpánek	6	6
(Germany) R Schüttler (Russia) M Youzhny	4	2
(Sweden) S Aspelin (Australia) T Perry	6	6

Final
(Czech Republic) J Novák (Czech Republic) R Štěpánek	6	6
(Sweden) S Aspelin (Australia) T Perry	2	4
