= 2007 Movistar Open =

- Date: 29 January – 4 February
- Edition: 15th
- Category: ATP International Series
- Draw: 24S (RR) / 16D
- Prize money: US$448,000
- Surface: Clay / outdoor
- Location: Viña del Mar, Chile

Champions

Singles
- (Peru) Luis Horna

Doubles
- (Chile) Paul Capdeville / (Spain) Óscar Hernández
| ← 2006 · | Chile Open | · 2008 → |

The 2007 Movistar Open was a professional men's tennis event on the 2007 ATP Tour in Viña del Mar, Chile, held from 29 January to 4 February 2007. It was the 15th edition of the tournament and was part of the ATP International Series of the 2007 ATP Tour. This was the second tournament of the season (alongside Adelaide, Delray Beach, Buenos Aires and Las Vegas) that implemented a 24-player round robin tournament for the singles competition, as part of the round-robin trials proposed during this season. Fifth-seeded Luis Horna won the singles title.

== Singles main-draw entrants ==
=== Seeds ===
| Country | Player | Rank^{1} | Seed |
|---|---|---|---|
| CHI | Fernando González | 9 | 1 |
| ARG | Gastón Gaudio | 34 | 2 |
| CHI | Nicolás Massú | 43 | 3 |
| ESP | Rubén Ramírez Hidalgo | 55 | 4 |
| PER | Luis Horna | 62 | 5 |
| ARG | Sergio Roitman | 78 | 6 |
| ESP | Albert Montañés | 83 | 7 |
| ARG | Martín Vassallo Argüello | 85 | 8 |

- Rankings are as of January 22, 2007.

=== Other entrants ===
The following players received wildcards into the main draw:

- (Chile) Paul Capdeville
- (Brazil) Gustavo Kuerten

The following players received entry from the qualifying draw:

- (Argentina) Juan Pablo Guzmán
- (Spain) Óscar Hernández
- (Spain) Albert Portas

The following player received entry as a lucky loser:

- (Argentina) Diego Junqueira

=== Withdrawals ===
During the tournament

- (Argentina) Gastón Gaudio (left thigh) → replaced by Diego Junqueira

=== Retirements ===
- (Argentina) Sergio Roitman (adductor)

== Doubles main-draw entrants ==
=== Seeds ===
| Country | Player | Country | Player | Rank^{1} | Seed |
|---|---|---|---|---|---|
| ARG | Martín García | ARG | Sebastián Prieto | 71 | 1 |
| PER | Luis Horna | ARG | Sergio Roitman | 133 | 2 |
| BRA | Marcelo Melo | BRA | André Sá | 178 | 3 |
| URU | Pablo Cuevas | CHI | Adrián García | 278 | 4 |

- ^{1} Rankings are as of January 22, 2007.

=== Other entrants ===
The following pairs received wildcards into the main draw:

- (Chile) Guillermo Hormazábal / (Chile) Hans Podlipnik
- (Brazil) Gustavo Kuerten / (Brazil) Flávio Saretta

The following pair received entry as alternates:

- (Brazil) André Ghem / (Costa Rica) Juan Antonio Marín

=== Withdrawals ===
Before the tournament

- (Chile) Adrián García (back)
- (Spain) Marc López (ankle) → replaced by André Ghem and/or Juan Antonio Marín

== Finals ==
=== Singles ===
(Peru) Luis Horna defeated (Chile) Nicolás Massú 7–5, 6–3

- It was Horna's only title of the year and the 2nd of his career.

=== Doubles ===
(Chile) Paul Capdeville / (Spain) Óscar Hernández defeated (Spain) Álbert Montañés / (Spain) Rubén Ramírez Hidalgo 4–6, 6–4, [10–6]

- It was the only title in both players' careers.
