= 2009 Movistar Open – Singles =

Singles
- 2009 Movistar Open

Final
- Champion: (Chile) Fernando González
- Runner-up: (Argentina) José Acasuso
- Score: 6–1, 6–3

Details
- Draw: 28
- Seeds: 8

Events
Singles	Doubles
- Movistar Open

Fernando González was the defending champion. He defeated José Acasuso in the final 6–1, 6–3.

== Seeds ==
1. (Chile) Fernando González (champion)
2. (Spain) Tommy Robredo (semifinals)
3. (Spain) Albert Montañés (second round)
4. (Argentina) José Acasuso (final)
5. (Argentina) Juan Mónaco (quarterfinals)
6. (Argentina) Eduardo Schwank (first round)
7. (Argentina) Agustín Calleri (second round)
8. (Spain) Óscar Hernández (first round)

== Draw ==
Key

- Q = Qualifier
- WC = Wild card
- LL = Lucky loser
- Alt = Alternate
- ITF = ITF entry
- PR = Protected ranking
- SR = Special ranking
- SE = Special exempt
- JE = Junior exempt
- JR = Junior Accelerator Programme entrant
- CO = College Accelerator Programme entrant
- NG = Next Gen Accelerator Program entrant
- w/o = Walkover
- r = Retired
- d = Defaulted

=== Finals ===
Semifinals
1	(Chile) Fernando González	6	6
Q	(Uruguay) Pablo Cuevas	3	2
4	(Argentina) José Acasuso	5	6	6
2	(Spain) Tommy Robredo	7	2	4

Final
1	(Chile) Fernando González	6	6
4	(Argentina) José Acasuso	1	3

=== Top half ===
First round
Q	(Argentina) M González	6	6
Q	(Serbia) B Pašanski	3	2
(Brazil) M Daniel	4	4
(Italy) P Starace	6	6
(France) N Devilder	2	4
5	(Argentina) J Mónaco	6	6
Q	(Uruguay) P Cuevas	6	3	7
(Ecuador) N Lapentti	3	6	5
(Spain) D Gimeno Traver	6	6^{2}	6
(Spain) A Martín	3	7^{7}	6^{r}
WC	(Chile) P Capdeville	6	6
6/WC	(Argentina) E Schwank	3	4

Second round
1	(Chile) F González	7	7^{9}
Q	(Argentina) M González	5	6^{7}
(Italy) P Starace	3	3
5	(Argentina) J Mónaco	6	6
3	(Spain) A Montañés	6^{2}	4
Q	(Uruguay) P Cuevas	7^{7}	6
(Spain) D Gimeno Traver	4	3
WC	(Chile) P Capdeville	6	6

Quarterfinals
1	(Chile) F González	6	6
5	(Argentina) J Mónaco	0	2
Q	(Uruguay) P Cuevas	7	7
WC	(Chile) P Capdeville	5	5

Semifinals
1	(Chile) F González	6	6
Q	(Uruguay) P Cuevas	3	2

=== Bottom half ===
First round
7	(Argentina) A Calleri	7^{7}	6
(Chile) N Massú	6^{4}	1
(Italy) F Fognini	3	5
LL	(Argentina) S Decoud	6	7
(Brazil) T Bellucci	6	6
Q	(Argentina) JP Brzezicki	2	3
8	(Spain) Ó Hernández	3	6^{1}
(Argentina) M Vassallo Argüello	6	7^{7}
(Spain) P Andújar	0	6	1
WC	(Argentina) JI Chela	6	3	6
(Argentina) D Junqueira	2	7^{7}	1
(Argentina) B Dabul	6	6^{2}	6

Second round
7	(Argentina) A Calleri	6^{3}	5
LL	(Argentina) S Decoud	7^{7}	7
(Brazil) T Bellucci	6^{3}	3
4	(Argentina) J Acasuso	7^{7}	6
(Argentina) M Vassallo Argüello	4	6^{4}
WC	(Argentina) JI Chela	6	7^{7}
(Argentina) B Dabul	3	6^{5}
2	(Spain) T Robredo	6	7^{7}

Quarterfinals
LL	(Argentina) S Decoud	4	2
4	(Argentina) J Acasuso	6	6
WC	(Argentina) JI Chela	6	3	4
2	(Spain) T Robredo	0	6	6

Semifinals
4	(Argentina) J Acasuso	5	6	6
2	(Spain) T Robredo	7	2	4

== Qualifying ==
=== Seeds ===
All seeds received a bye into the second round.

1. (Argentina) Máximo González (qualified)
2. (Uruguay) Pablo Cuevas (qualified)
3. (Argentina) Diego Hartfield (second round)
4. (Serbia) Boris Pašanski (qualified)
5. (Argentina) Juan Pablo Brzezicki (qualified)
6. (Argentina) Sebastián Decoud (qualifying competition, Lucky loser)
7. (Spain) Daniel Muñoz de la Nava (qualifying competition)
8. (Spain) David Marrero (qualifying competition)

=== Qualifiers ===
1. (Argentina) Máximo González
2. (Uruguay) Pablo Cuevas
3. (Argentina) Juan Pablo Brzezicki
4. (Serbia) Boris Pašanski

=== Lucky loser ===
1. (Argentina) Sebastián Decoud

=== Qualifying draw ===
==== First qualifier ====
First round
(Argentina) Emiliano García Blanksman	2	2
(Chile) Ricardo Urzúa Rivera	6	6
(Chile) Hans Podlipnik	4	6^{7}
(Czech Republic) František Čermák	6	7^{9}

Second round
1	(Argentina) Máximo González	6	6
(Chile) Ricardo Urzúa Rivera	2	1
7	(Spain) Daniel Muñoz de la Nava	6	6
(Czech Republic) František Čermák	0	3

Qualifying competition
1	(Argentina) Máximo González	7	6^{4}	6
7	(Spain) Daniel Muñoz de la Nava	5	7^{7}	3

==== Second qualifier ====
First round
(Chile) Víctor Núñez	1	3
(Chile) Francisco Olivares	6	6
(Chile) David Vélez Lepe	4	4
(Italy) Alessio di Mauro	6	6

Second round
2	(Uruguay) Pablo Cuevas	6	6
(Chile) Francisco Olivares	1	1
8	(Spain) David Marrero	6	6
(Italy) Alessio di Mauro	2	4

Qualifying competition
2	(Uruguay) Pablo Cuevas	3	6	6
8	(Spain) David Marrero	6	4	3

==== Third qualifier ====
First round
(Argentina) Mariano Zabaleta	7	3	6
(Chile) Adrián García	5	6	2
(Chile) Ignacio Lehyt	4	6^{3}
(Chile) Ángel Torres	6	7^{7}

Second round
3	(Argentina) Diego Hartfield	6	4	6^{4}
(Argentina) Mariano Zabaleta	0	6	7^{7}
5	(Argentina) Juan Pablo Brzezicki	6	6
(Chile) Ángel Torres	2	0

Qualifying competition
(Argentina) Mariano Zabaleta	3	0
5	(Argentina) Juan Pablo Brzezicki	6	6

==== Fourth qualifier ====
First round
(Spain) Miguel Pérez Puigdomenech	6	6
(Chile) Víctor Morales	4	2
(Slovakia) Michal Mertiňák	7	6^{3}	6^{3}
(Italy) Gianluca Naso	5	7^{7}	7^{7}

Second round
4	(Serbia) Boris Pašanski	6	6
(Spain) Miguel Pérez Puigdomenech	1	0
6	(Argentina) Sebastián Decoud	2	7^{7}	6
(Italy) Gianluca Naso	6	6^{5}	4

Qualifying competition
4	(Serbia) Boris Pašanski	6	6
6	(Argentina) Sebastián Decoud	4	4
