= 2008 Movistar Open =

- Date: January 28–February 3
- Edition: 16th
- Category: International Series
- Draw: 32S / 16D
- Prize money: $437,000
- Surface: Clay / Outdoor
- Location: Viña del Mar, Chile
- Venue: Centro de Tenis Las Salinas

Champions

Singles
- (Chile) Fernando González

Doubles
- (Argentina) José Acasuso / (Argentina) Sebastián Prieto
← 2007 ·	Chile Open	· 2009 →

The 2008 Movistar Open was a men's tennis tournament played on outdoor clay courts. It was the 16th edition of the Movistar Open, and was part of the International Series of the 2008 ATP Tour. It took place at the Centro de Tenis Las Salinas in Viña del Mar, Chile, from January 28 through February 3, 2008.

The field was headlined by 2007 Madrid Masters quarterfinalist, 2002 and 2004 Viña del Mar champion Fernando González, 2007 U.S. Open quarterfinalist and 2004 Viña del Mar doubles titlist Juan Ignacio Chela, and Auckland semifinalist Juan Mónaco. Other seeded players were 2007 St. Petersburg finalist Fernando Verdasco, Doha and Sydney quarterfinalist Agustín Calleri, Óscar Hernández, José Acasuso and Nicolás Massú.

== Notable stories ==
=== Gonzalez's walkover win ===
Fernando González won the title by default after Juan Mónaco was forced to withdraw from the tournament, after retiring during the doubles final, where he played alongside Máximo González, due to a left ankle injury. Gonzalez was announced as the champion after his semifinal win over Pablo Cuevas, in which he saved two match points.

== Finals ==
=== Singles ===
(Chile) Fernando González defeated (Argentina) Juan Mónaco, walkover

- It was Fernando González's 1st title of the year, and his 9th overall. It was his 3rd win at the event.

=== Doubles ===
(Argentina) José Acasuso / (Argentina) Sebastián Prieto defeated (Argentina) Máximo González / (Argentina) Juan Mónaco, 6–1, 3–0 retired
