= Maximilian Abel =

German tennis player (born 1982)

- Country (sports): Germany
- Born: 28 February 1982 (age 44) Frankfurt, West Germany
- Turned pro: 1999
- Retired: 2014
- Plays: Right-handed
- Prize money: $130,828

Singles
- Career record: 2–7
- Career titles: 0
- Highest ranking: No. 183 (21 July 2003)

Grand Slam singles results
- US Open: 1R (2003)

Doubles
- Highest ranking: No. 470 (10 February 2003)

Maximilian Abel (born 28 February 1982) is a retired professional tennis player from Germany. In 2008, Abel received a two-year suspension by the International Tennis Federation, for testing positive for cocaine.

== Junior career ==
Abel was runner-up to Andy Roddick at the 1999 Orange Bowl, in the 18 and under category. En route to the final he had wins over Feliciano López and Mardy Fish.

== Professional career ==
Abel reached the final of the Campos do Jordão Challenger tournament in 2002, which he lost to Ricardo Mello.

He lost to Bohdan Ulihrach in four sets at the 2003 US Open, which would be his only Grand Slam main draw appearance.

In 2003 he advanced to the second round of the Dubai Tennis Championships, where he lost to Roger Federer, and the MercedesCup, where he defeated Antony Dupuis before being eliminated by Rainer Schüttler.

== Controversy ==
In April 2008, Abel received a two-year suspension by the International Tennis Federation, for testing positive for a metabolite of cocaine. The sample had come from the 2007 Open de Moselle, where Abel participated in the qualifying rounds.

Abel was arrested in 2008 and in March 2009 was sentenced to three years in prison, convicted of credit card fraud. In September 2012, Abel made his comeback at a Challenger tournament in Istanbul. In February 2014, a conditional discharge of one year was the sentence after having been convicted of the same type of crime like in 2009. After another conviction of multiple fraud and theft related to his problem gambling, he was sentenced to prison until March 2018. In June 2017 this sentence was extended by another two years and ten months. Shortly before July 2022, Abel was sentenced to another 4 years and 10 months plus one year and 11 months in prison for credit card fraud.
