= Aljoscha Thron =

German tennis player

- Country (sports): Germany
- Born: 15 June 1987 (age 37)
- Plays: Right-handed
- Prize money: $14,213

Singles
- Career record: 0–2
- Highest ranking: No. 608 (17 July 2006)

Doubles
- Career record: 1–1
- Highest ranking: No. 676 (6 March 2006)

Aljoscha Thron (born 15 June 1987) is a German former professional tennis player.

Thron won a Junior Davis Cup title with Germany in 2003, as a teammate of Mischa Zverev and Matthias Bachinger. He was a boys' doubles semi-finalist at the 2005 French Open, partnering Kim Sun-yong.

On the ATP Tour, Thron made singles main draws at the 2005 Stuttgart Open and 2005 Ho Chi Minh City Open.

Thron, a qualified medical doctor, is the agent/manager of WTA Tour player Angelique Kerber and since 2020 has been the tournament director of the Bad Homburg Open.
