= 2003 MercedesCup =

- Date: 14–20 July
- Edition: 55th
- Category: International Series Gold
- Draw: 48S / 16D
- Prize money: $665,000
- Surface: Clay / outdoor
- Location: Stuttgart, Germany
- Venue: Tennis Club Weissenhof

Champions

Singles
- (Argentina) Guillermo Coria

Doubles
- (Czech Republic) Tomáš Cibulec / (Czech Republic) Pavel Vízner
- Stuttgart Open

The 2003 MercedesCup was a men's tennis tournament played on outdoor clay courts at the Tennis Club Weissenhof in Stuttgart, Germany and was part of the International Series Gold of the 2003 ATP Tour. The tournament was held from 14 July until 20 July 2003. Second-seeded Guillermo Coria won the singles.

== Finals ==
=== Singles ===
(Argentina) Guillermo Coria defeated (Spain) Tommy Robredo 6–2, 6–2, 6–1

- It was Coria's 2nd title of the year and the 3rd of his career.

=== Doubles ===
(Czech Republic) Tomáš Cibulec / (Czech Republic) Pavel Vízner defeated (Russia) Yevgeny Kafelnikov / (Zimbabwe) Kevin Ullyett 3–6, 6–3, 6–4

- It was Cibulec's 2nd title of the year and the 3rd of his career. It was Vízner's 2nd title of the year and the 5th of his career.
