= Carlos Cuadrado =

Spanish tennis player (born 1983)

- Country (sports): Spain
- Residence: Melbourne, Australia
- Born: 1 June 1983 (age 42) Barcelona, Spain
- Height: 1.80 m (5 ft 11 in)
- Retired: 2006
- Plays: Right-handed
- Coach: Carlos Martinez
- Prize money: $83,404

Singles
- Career record: 4–4
- Career titles: 0; 0 Challenger, 1 Futures
- Highest ranking: No. 222 (10 April 2006)

Grand Slam singles results
- Australian Open: Q2 (2002)
- French Open: Q1 (2006)
- Wimbledon: Q2 (2006)

Doubles
- Career record: 0–2
- Career titles: 0; 0 Challenger, 0 Futures
- Highest ranking: No. 506 (28 January 2002)
- Last updated on: 16 May 2021.

Carlos Cuadrado (born 1 June 1983) is a former Spanish professional tennis player. He won the French Open juniors singles in 2001.

== Career ==
His best performance at a professional tournament was at Viña del Mar in 2006, when he progressed to the quarterfinals. After progressing through qualifying, he defeated Tomas Behrend and Daniel Gimeno-Traver before losing against Chilean Nicolás Massú 6–4, 6–7, 3–6. After defeating Dmitry Tursunov in the ATP 500 Barcelona he fell to Paul-Henri Mathieu. In a Challenger tournament in Tarragona, he retired against Albert Portas due to a hip injury. His career ended in the same year as he retired at the age of 22.

On the ATP Challenger Circuit, he achieved moderate success, reaching four semi-finals, all on clay courts; Vigo (2005, l. Ivan Navarro), Geneva (2005, l. Werner Eschauer), Monza (2006, l. Flavio Cipolla) and Turin (2006, l. Marcel Granollers).

== Coaching ==
After his retirement, Cuadrado coached Svetlana Kuznetsova.

== ATP Challenger and ITF Futures finals ==
=== Singles: 4 (1–3) ===
Legend ATP Challenger (0–0) ITF Futures (1–3)	Finals by surface Hard (0–0) Clay (1–3) Grass (0–0) Carpet (0–0)

Result	W–L	Date	Tournament	Tier	Surface	Opponent	Score
Loss	0–1	Aug 2000	Germany F11, Berlin	Futures	Clay	(Sweden) Johan Settergren	3–6, 1–6
Win	1–1	Jul 2001	Germany F7, Zell	Futures	Clay	(Sweden) Daniel Andersson	6–1, 6–1
Loss	1–2	Dec 2001	Spain F16, Gran Canaria	Futures	Clay	(Spain) Ivan Navarro	1–6, 4–6
Loss	1–3	Sep 2004	Spain F21, Oviedo	Futures	Clay	(Spain) Marc Fornell-Mestres	5–7, 6–4, 4–6

=== Doubles: 1 (0–1) ===
Legend ATP Challenger (0–0) ITF Futures (0–1)	Finals by surface Hard (0–0) Clay (0–1) Grass (0–0) Carpet (0–0)

Result	W–L	Date	Tournament	Tier	Surface	Partner	Opponents	Score
Loss	0–1	Jul 2001	Germany F7, Zell	Futures	Clay	(Spain) Gorka Fraile	(Australia) Stephen Huss (Australia) Lee Pearson	3–6, 1–6

== Junior Grand Slam finals ==
=== Singles: 1 (1 title) ===
Result	Year	Championship	Surface	Opponent	Score
Win	2001	French Open	Clay	(Argentina) Brian Dabul	6–1, 6–0
