= 2006 Movistar Open =

- Date: January 30 – February 6
- Edition: 13th
- Category: International Series
- Draw: 32S / 16D
- Prize money: $355,000
- Surface: Clay / outdoor
- Location: Viña del Mar, Chile

Champions

Singles
- (Argentina) José Acasuso

Doubles
- (Argentina) José Acasuso / (Argentina) Sebastián Prieto
| ← 2005 · | Chile Open | · 2007 → |

The 2006 Movistar Open was an ATP men's tennis tournament held on outdoor clay courts in Viña del Mar, Chile that was part of the International Series of the 2006 ATP Tour. It was the 12th edition of the tournament and was held from 30 January to 6 February 2005. Third-seeded José Acasuso won the singles title.

== Finals ==
=== Singles ===
(Argentina) José Acasuso defeated (Chile) Nicolás Massú 6–4, 6–3

- It was Acasuso's 1st singles title of the year and the 3rd and last of his career.

=== Doubles ===
(Argentina) José Acasuso / (Argentina) Sebastián Prieto defeated (Czech Republic) František Čermák / (Czech Republic) Leoš Friedl 7–6^{(7–2)}, 6–4

- It was Acasuso's 1st title of the year and the 6th of his career. It was Prieto's only title of the year and the 7th of his career.
