= 2005 Mercedes Cup =

- Date: 18–24 July
- Edition: 28th
- Category: International Series Gold
- Prize money: €590.000
- Surface: Clay / outdoor
- Location: Stuttgart, Germany
- Venue: Tennis Club Weissenhof

Champions

Singles
- (Spain) Rafael Nadal

Doubles
- (Argentina) José Acasuso / (Argentina) Sebastián Prieto
- Stuttgart Open

The 2005 Mercedes Cup was a men's tennis tournament played on outdoor clay courts. It was the 28th edition of the Mercedes Cup, and was part of the ATP International Series Gold of the 2005 ATP Tour. It was held at the Tennis Club Weissenhof in Stuttgart, Germany, from 18 July until 24 July 2005. First-seeded Rafael Nadal won the singles title.

== Finals ==
=== Singles ===
(Spain) Rafael Nadal defeated (Argentina) Gastón Gaudio, 6–3, 6–3, 6–4

- It was Nadal's 8th singles title of the year and 9th of his career.

=== Doubles ===
(Argentina) José Acasuso / (Argentina) Sebastián Prieto defeated (Argentina) Mariano Hood / (Spain) Tommy Robredo 7–6^{(7–4)}, 6–3
