= José Acasuso =

Argentine tennis player (born 1982)

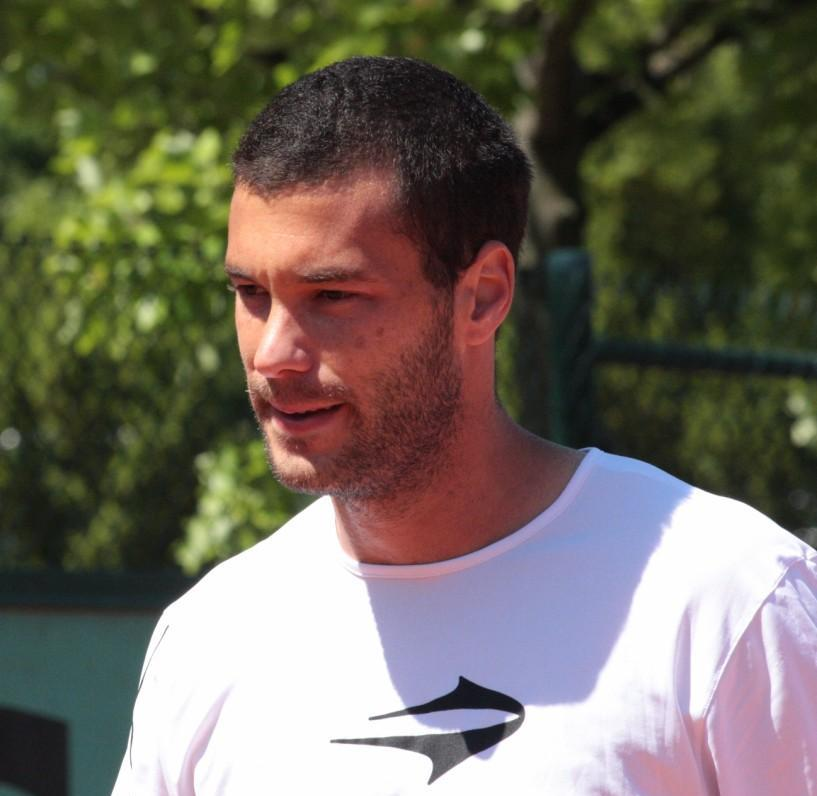
- Country (sports): Argentina
- Residence: Buenos Aires, Argentina
- Born: 20 October 1982 (age 44) Posadas, Misiones, Argentina
- Height: 1.90 m (6 ft 3 in)
- Turned pro: 1999
- Retired: 2012
- Plays: Right-handed (one-handed backhand)
- Prize money: $3,642,422

Singles
- Career record: 193–183 (51.3%)
- Career titles: 3
- Highest ranking: No. 20 (14 August 2006)

Grand Slam singles results
- Australian Open: 2R (2002, 2003)
- French Open: 4R (2005)
- Wimbledon: 1R (2001, 2002, 2003, 2004, 2005, 2009)
- US Open: 3R (2009)

Doubles
- Career record: 95–89 (51.6%)
- Career titles: 5
- Highest ranking: No. 27 (6 February 2006)

Grand Slam doubles results
- Australian Open: 3R (2006)
- French Open: QF (2009)
- Wimbledon: 1R (2003, 2005, 2009)
- US Open: 2R (2005)
- Last updated on: 8 December 2021.

José Javier "Chucho" Acasuso (Spanish pronunciation: [xoˈse xaˈβjeɾ ˈtʃutʃo akaˈsuso]; born 20 October 1982) is a tennis coach and a former professional player from Argentina. Like many of his fellow countrymen, he favoured clay. He was known for his strong serve and his hard groundstrokes off both sides.

He won three ATP Tour singles titles. In doubles, Acasuso together with Sebastián Prieto, won four titles: in 2005 in Stuttgart and also in Bucharest, and in 2006 and 2008 in Viña Del Mar. He also won a doubles title partnering Flávio Saretta at the Croatia Open Umag in 2004.

== Early years ==
Acasuso began playing tennis at the age of two, when his father took his brother and sister to his grandfather's tennis club. Reportedly, he got the nickname of "Chucho" from the fact that, when he was a child, he used to say his name was "José Acachucho." Acasuso played both basketball and tennis up until the age of 12, and then gave up basketball for tennis.

== Career ==
Acasuso turned professional in 2000, playing futures and challenger events. In 2001, at the age of 18 years and four months, he made an immediate impact in his first ATP tournament in Buenos Aires, where he defeated former No. 10 player Félix Mantilla in the last round of the qualifying to make the main draw, and then defeated compatriots Franco Squillari in the quarterfinals and Gastón Gaudio in the semifinals. However, he lost in his first ATP final to then-number-1 player Gustavo Kuerten 6–1, 6–3. Later in the year, he won his first ATP Challenger Tour event in Bermuda and finished the year ranked at No. 86 in the world, an improvement of 89 places from the previous year.

In 2002, he was on the Argentine team that won the World Team Cup in Düsseldorf. He won his first ATP title in Sopot, defeating Franco Squillari in three sets. He was also a finalist in Bucharest, losing to David Ferrer, and in Palermo to the Chilean Fernando González. He ended the year ranked 41st in the world. After the previous two successful years, Acasuso's results began to decline and he ended up spending more time out due to injuries. He did not win a title in 2003.

In 2004, however, he reached the final of Sopot again, this time losing to Rafael Nadal. Acasuso then went on to win his second career title in Bucharest by beating Russian Igor Andreev in two sets.

Acasuso reached the fourth round of the 2005 French Open, his best ever result in any of the Grand Slam events. He defeated number-2-seeded Andy Roddick in five sets, coming back from 2 sets to love down and a break of serve to win. He then lost to fellow Argentine Mariano Puerta for the second time in the year. He also improved his results away from his favoured clay surface by making the quarter-finals on hard courts in Cincinnati and on carpet in Basel.

In 2006, Acasuso won his third ATP title in Viña del Mar over Nicolás Massú and also made his debut for Argentina in the Davis Cup against Sweden in the singles. He then played against Croatia in the doubles with David Nalbandian. They won their match and the tie to play against Australia in the semi-finals.

After reaching his first Tennis Masters Series semi-final in Hamburg, where Acasuso defeated Simon Greul, Ivan Ljubičić, Sébastien Grosjean, and Fernando Verdasco, before losing to Radek Štěpánek in straight sets, he was ranked inside the top 30 for the first time in his career. Acasuso lost in the final of Stuttgart to David Ferrer in five sets, after having a 5–1 lead in the fourth set and served for the match twice.

In the 2006 Davis Cup tie between Argentina and Australia, Acasuso ended the run of 11 consecutive wins that Lleyton Hewitt was on of winning in 5 set matches, when he defeated him in a five-set match that was completed over two days. Of the win Acasuso said "I've beaten higher-ranked players in the past but to win at home in a Davis Cup semi-final with 14,000 people watching me here makes it one of the most important wins of my career". Acasuso was a late substitute for Juan Ignacio Chela in the deciding fifth rubber of the 2006 Davis Cup Final against Marat Safin of Russia. Safin won in four sets, lifting the Davis Cup for Russia.

In the 2008 Davis Cup final, Acasuso was once again a late substitute in what turned out to be the tie-deciding fourth rubber. He replaced an injured Juan Martín del Potro and was defeated by Fernando Verdasco of Spain in a five-set match.

Acasuso made the final of the 2009 Viña del Mar event, where he lost to Chilean Fernando González in straight sets. His most notable match in 2009 was his second round match at the French Open against the eventual champion Roger Federer in which he lost in four sets. In this match he missed four set points in the first set and three set points in the third set while leading that set by 5–1.

On 24 February 2012, Acasuso officially announced his retirement from professional tennis.

== Personal info ==
Like Carlos Moyá, Acasuso is a natural left-hander, but plays tennis right-handed. Acasuso was previously coached by Horacio de la Peña, Daniel Orsanic and later worked with Gabriel Markus.

Acasuso began coaching Guido Pella in 2018.

His clothes sponsor was Topper and his racquet sponsor Head.

== ATP career finals ==
=== Singles: 11 (3 titles, 8 runner-ups) ===
Legend Grand Slam Tournaments (0–0) ATP World Tour Finals (0–0) ATP Masters Series (0–0) ATP Championship Series (0–1) ATP World Series (3–7)	Finals by surface Hard (0–0) Clay (3–8) Grass (0–0) Carpet (0–0)	Finals by setting Outdoors (3–8) Indoors (0–0)

Result	W–L	Date	Tournament	Tier	Surface	Opponent	Score
Loss	0–1	Feb 2001	Buenos Aires, Argentina	World Series	Clay	(Brazil) Gustavo Kuerten	1–6, 3–6
Win	1–1	Jul 2002	Sopot, Poland	World Series	Clay	(Argentina) Franco Squillari	2–6, 6–1, 6–3
Loss	1–2	Sep 2002	Bucharest, Romania	World Series	Clay	(Spain) David Ferrer	3–6, 3–6
Loss	1–3	Sep 2002	Palermo, Italy	World Series	Clay	(Chile) Fernando González	7–5, 3–6, 1–6
Loss	1–4	Aug 2004	Sopot, Poland	World Series	Clay	(Spain) Rafael Nadal	3–6, 4–6
Win	2–4	Sep 2004	Bucharest, Romania	World Series	Clay	(Russia) Igor Andreev	6–3, 6–0
Win	3–4	Jan 2006	Viña del Mar, Chile	World Series	Clay	(Chile) Nicolás Massú	6–4, 6–3
Loss	3–5	Jul 2006	Stuttgart, Germany	Championship Series	Clay	(Spain) David Ferrer	4–6, 6–3, 7–6^{(7–3)}, 5–7, 4–6
Loss	3–6	Aug 2007	Sopot, Poland	World Series	Clay	(Spain) Tommy Robredo	5–7, 0–6
Loss	3–7	Feb 2008	Buenos Aires, Argentina	World Series	Clay	(Argentina) David Nalbandian	6–3, 6–7^{(5–7)}, 4–6
Loss	3–8	Feb 2009	Viña del Mar, Chile	250 Series	Clay	(Chile) Fernando González	1–6, 3–6

=== Doubles: 11 (5 titles, 6 runner-ups) ===
Legend Grand Slam Tournaments (0–0) ATP World Tour Finals (0–0) ATP Masters Series (0–0) ATP Championship Series (1–0) ATP World Series (4–6)	Finals by surface Hard (0–1) Clay (5–5) Grass (0–0) Carpet (0–0)	Finals by setting Outdoors (5–6) Indoors (0–0)

Result	W–L	Date	Tournament	Tier	Surface	Partner	Opponents	Score
Loss	0–1	Jul 2004	Amersfoort, Netherlands	International Series	Clay	(Peru) Luis Horna	(Czech Republic) Jaroslav Levinský (Czech Republic) David Škoch	0–6, 6–2, 5–7
Win	1–1	Jul 2004	Umag, Croatia	International Series	Clay	(Brazil) Flávio Saretta	(Czech Republic) Jaroslav Levinský (Czech Republic) David Škoch	4–6, 6–2, 6–4
Loss	1–2	Sep 2004	Bucharest, Romania	International Series	Clay	(Spain) Óscar Hernández	(Argentina) Lucas Arnold Ker (Argentina) Mariano Hood	6–7^{(5–7)}, 1–6
Loss	1–3	Feb 2005	Buenos Aires, Argentina	International Series	Clay	(Argentina) Sebastián Prieto	(Czech Republic) František Čermák (Czech Republic) Leoš Friedl	2–6, 5–7
Loss	1–4	Feb 2005	Bahia, Brazil	International Series	Clay	(Argentina) Ignacio González King	(Czech Republic) František Čermák (Czech Republic) Leoš Friedl	4–6, 4–6
Loss	1–5	Jul 2005	Båstad, Sweden	International Series	Clay	(Argentina) Sebastián Prieto	(Sweden) Jonas Björkman (Sweden) Joachim Johansson	2–6, 3–6
Win	2–5	Jul 2005	Stuttgart, Germany	Championship Series	Clay	(Argentina) Sebastián Prieto	(Argentina) Mariano Hood (Spain) Tommy Robredo	7–6^{(7–4)}, 6–3
Win	3–5	Sep 2005	Bucharest, Romania	International Series	Clay	(Argentina) Sebastián Prieto	(Romania) Victor Hănescu (Romania) Andrei Pavel	6–3, 4–6, 6–3
Loss	3–6	Oct 2005	Metz, France	International Series	Hard	(Argentina) Sebastián Prieto	(France) Michaël Llodra (France) Fabrice Santoro	2–5, 5–3, 4–5^{(4–7)}
Win	4–6	Jan 2006	Viña del Mar, Chile	International Series	Clay	(Argentina) Sebastián Prieto	(Czech Republic) František Čermák (Czech Republic) Leoš Friedl	7–6^{(7–2)}, 6–4
Win	5–6	Feb 2008	Viña del Mar, Chile	International Series	Clay	(Argentina) Sebastián Prieto	(Argentina) Máximo González (Argentina) Juan Mónaco	6–1, 3–0, ret.

== ATP Challenger and ITF Futures Finals ==
=== Singles: 13 (6–7) ===
Legend ATP Challenger (4–5) ITF Futures (2–2)	Finals by surface Hard (0–1) Clay (6–6) Grass (0–0) Carpet (0–0)

Result	W–L	Date	Tournament	Tier	Surface	Opponent	Score
Win	1–0	Nov 1999	Argentina F4, Rosario	Futures	Clay	(Argentina) Rodrigo Cerdera	1–6, 6–2, 7–5
Loss	1–1	May 2000	Argentina F4, Mendoza	Futures	Clay	(Argentina) Sergio Roitman	6–1, 6–7^{(2–7)}, 2–6
Win	2–1	May 2000	Argentina F5, Rosario	Futures	Clay	(Argentina) Diego Hipperdinger	6–0, 6–4
Loss	2–2	Oct 2000	Brazil F2, Florianópolis	Futures	Clay	(Argentina) Diego Veronelli	2–6, 4–6
Loss	2–3	Nov 2000	Montevideo, Uruguay	Challenger	Clay	(Argentina) Guillermo Coria	3–6, 7–6^{(11–9)}, 2–6
Win	3–3	Apr 2001	Paget, Bermuda	Challenger	Clay	(Spain) David Sánchez	7–6^{(7–4)}, 6–1
Loss	3–4	Jun 2002	Biella, Italy	Challenger	Clay	(Slovakia) Dominik Hrbatý	4–6, 7–6^{(7–4)}, 4–6
Loss	3–5	Jun 2002	Braunschweig, Germany	Challenger	Clay	(Spain) David Sánchez	1–5 ret.
Win	4–5	Aug 2002	San Marino, San Marino	Challenger	Clay	(Spain) Albert Portas	3–6, 6–3, 6–2
Loss	4–6	Jun 2003	Biella, Italy	Challenger	Clay	(Italy) Filippo Volandri	6–2, 6–7^{(4–7)}, 4–6
Loss	4–7	Oct 2007	Andrezieux, France	Challenger	Hard	(France) Thierry Ascione	6–7^{(6–8)}, 6–2, 2–6
Win	5–7	May 2010	Tunis, Tunisia	Challenger	Clay	(Germany) Daniel Brands	6–3, 6–4
Win	6–7	Apr 2011	Blumenau, Brazil	Challenger	Clay	(Brazil) Marcelo Demoliner	6–2, 6–2

=== Doubles: 5 (1–4) ===
Legend ATP Challenger (1–2) ITF Futures (0–2)	Finals by surface Hard (0–1) Clay (1–3) Grass (0–0) Carpet (0–0)

Result	W–L	Date	Tournament	Tier	Surface	Partner	Opponents	Score
Loss	0–1	Jul 1999	Uruguay F1, Montevideo	Futures	Clay	(Argentina) Walter Grinovero	(Brazil) Pedro Braga (Brazil) Leonardo Silva	1–6, 3–6
Loss	0–2	Mar 2000	Argentina F1, Mendoza	Futures	Clay	(Argentina) Leonardo Olguín	(Argentina) Enzo Artoni (Argentina) Andrés Schneiter	1–6, 3–6
Loss	0–3	Oct 2001	Lima, Peru	Challenger	Clay	(Argentina) Martín Vassallo Argüello	(Argentina) Enzo Artoni (Brazil) Daniel Melo	2–6, 6–1, 6–7^{(7–9)}
Win	1–3	Sep 2002	Szczecin, Poland	Challenger	Clay	(Argentina) Andrés Schneiter	(Czech Republic) David Škoch (Czech Republic) Leoš Friedl	6–4, 7–5
Loss	1–4	Oct 2007	Andrézieux, France	Challenger	Hard	(Argentina) Diego Hartfield	(Argentina) Sebastián Prieto (Argentina) Martín García	3–6, 1–6

== Team competition finals: 2 (2 runner-up) ==
Result	No.	Date	Tournament	Surface	Partner	Opponents	Score
Runner-up	1.	December 1–3, 2006	Davis Cup, Moscow, Russia	Carpet (i)	(Argentina) David Nalbandian (Argentina) Agustín Calleri (Argentina) Juan Ignacio Chela	(Russia) Marat Safin (Russia) Nikolay Davydenko (Russia) Mikhail Youzhny (Russia) Dmitry Tursunov	2–3
Runner-up	2.	November 21–23, 2008	Davis Cup, Mar del Plata, Argentina	Hard (i)	(Argentina) David Nalbandian (Argentina) Juan Martín del Potro (Argentina) Agustín Calleri	(Spain) David Ferrer (Spain) Fernando Verdasco (Spain) Feliciano López (Spain) Marcel Granollers	1–3

== Performance timelines ==
Key
W	F	SF	QF	#R	RR	Q#	DNQ	A	NH

(W) winner; (F) finalist; (SF) semifinalist; (QF) quarterfinalist; (#R) rounds 4, 3, 2, 1; (RR) round-robin stage; (Q#) qualification round; (DNQ) did not qualify; (A) absent; (NH) not held; (SR) strike rate (events won / competed); (W–L) win–loss record.

=== Singles ===
Tournament	2000	2001	2002	2003	2004	2005	2006	2007	2008	2009	2010	2011	SR	W–L	Win%
Grand Slam tournaments
Australian Open	A	A	2R	2R	1R	1R	1R	1R	1R	A	1R	A	0 / 8	2–8	20%
French Open	Q3	2R	1R	1R	A	4R	2R	1R	2R	2R	Q3	Q1	0 / 8	7–8	47%
Wimbledon	A	1R	1R	1R	1R	1R	A	A	A	1R	A	A	0 / 6	0–6	0%
US Open	A	1R	1R	1R	1R	2R	1R	2R	2R	3R	A	A	0 / 9	5–9	36%
Win–loss	0–0	1–3	1–4	1–4	0–3	4–4	1–3	1–3	2–3	3–3	0–1	0–0	0 / 31	14–31	31%
ATP World Tour Masters 1000
Indian Wells	A	A	Q1	1R	A	1R	2R	3R	1R	1R	A	A	0 / 6	3–6	33%
Miami	A	A	1R	2R	Q1	2R	2R	2R	4R	1R	A	A	0 / 7	6–7	46%
Monte Carlo	A	A	Q1	1R	A	Q2	2R	1R	1R	1R	A	A	0 / 5	1–5	17%
Rome	A	A	1R	A	A	A	2R	3R	2R	1R	A	A	0 / 5	4–5	44%
Madrid	NH		2R	A	Q1	3R	1R	A	Q2	1R	A	A	0 / 4	2–4	33%
Canada	A	A	A	2R	A	1R	QF	A	3R	A	A	A	0 / 4	6–4	60%
Cincinnati	A	A	A	1R	A	QF	1R	A	2R	2R	A	A	0 / 5	5–5	50%
Shanghai	Not Masters Series									1R	A	A	0 / 1	0–1	0%
Paris	A	A	Q1	A	A	A	1R	Q2	A	A	A	A	0 / 1	0–1	0%
Hamburg	A	A	A	A	A	A	SF	3R	2R	NMS			0 / 3	7–3	70%
Win–loss	0–0	0–0	0–3	2–5	0–0	6–5	11–9	6–5	8–7	1–7	0–0	0–0	0 / 41	34–41	45%
Career statistics
Tournaments played	0	12	19	19	17	26	22	19	24	21	3	1	Total: 183		
Titles–Finals	0–0	0–1	1–3	0–0	1–2	0–0	1–2	0–1	0–1	0–1	0–0	0–0	3 / 14	3–11	21%
Year-end ranking	-	86	41	101	67	40	27	65	48	51	253	255	Prize Money: $3,642.442		

=== Doubles ===
Tournament	2003	2004	2005	2006	2007	2008	2009	2010	SR	W–L	Win%
Grand Slam tournaments
Australian Open	1R	A	1R	3R	1R	1R	A	1R	0 / 6	2–6	25%
French Open	1R	A	A	2R	A	2R	QF	A	0 / 4	5–4	56%
Wimbledon	1R	A	1R	A	A	A	1R	A	0 / 3	0–3	0%
US Open	1R	1R	2R	1R	1R	1R	1R	A	0 / 7	1–7	13%
Win–loss	0–4	0–1	1–3	3–3	0–2	1–3	3–3	0–1	0 / 20	8–20	29%
ATP Tour Masters 1000
Indian Wells	A	A	A	1R	A	A	A	A	0 / 1	0–1	0%
Miami	A	A	2R	1R	A	1R	1R	A	0 / 4	1–4	20%
Monte Carlo	A	A	A	SF	2R	1R	A	A	0 / 3	4–3	57%
Rome	A	A	A	1R	1R	1R	A	A	0 / 3	0–3	0%
Hamburg	A	A	A	1R	A	A	NMS		0 / 1	0–1	0%
Canada	A	A	A	1R	A	A	A	A	0 / 1	0–1	0%
Cincinnati	A	A	A	1R	A	A	A	A	0 / 1	1–1	50%
Paris	A	A	A	A	A	2R	A	A	0 / 1	1–1	50%
Win–loss	0–0	0–0	1–1	4–7	1–2	1–4	0–1	0–0	0 / 15	7–15	32%
