= 2012 VTR Open =

- Date: January 28 – February 5
- Edition: 19th
- Category: ATP World Tour 250 series
- Draw: 28S / 16D
- Prize money: $398,250
- Surface: Clay / outdoor
- Location: Viña del Mar, Chile

Champions

Singles
- (Argentina) Juan Mónaco

Doubles
- (Portugal) Frederico Gil / (Spain) Daniel Gimeno-Traver
← 2011 ·	Chile Open	· 2013 →

The 2012 VTR Open was a men's tennis tournament play on outdoor clay courts. It was the 19th edition of the VTR Open, and was part of the ATP World Tour 250 series of the 2012 ATP World Tour. It took place in Viña del Mar, Chile from January 28 through February 5, 2012. After two editions hosted in Santiago, the event returned to Viña del Mar.

== Singles main draw entrants ==
=== Seeds ===
Country	Player	Rank^{1}	Seed
ARG	Juan Mónaco	27	1
ARG	Juan Ignacio Chela	29	2
BRA	Thomaz Bellucci	37	3
ESP	Pablo Andújar	45	4
ESP	Albert Montañés	50	5
COL	Santiago Giraldo	56	6
ARG	Carlos Berlocq	61	7
ITA	Filippo Volandri	72	8

- Rankings are as of January 16, 2012

=== Other entrants ===
The following players received wildcards into the singles main draw:

- (Chile) Paul Capdeville
- (Chile) Fernando González
- (Chile) Nicolás Massú

The following players received entry from the qualifying draw:

- (Argentina) Federico del Bonis
- (Brazil) Rogério Dutra da Silva
- (Argentina) Diego Junqueira
- (Spain) Rubén Ramírez Hidalgo

=== Withdrawals ===
- (Spain) Tommy Robredo (leg injury)

== Doubles main draw entrants ==
=== Seeds ===
Country	Player	Country	Player	Rank^{1}	Seed
BRA	André Sá	BRA	Bruno Soares	77	1
COL	Juan Sebastián Cabal	COL	Robert Farah	103	2
ESP	David Marrero	ESP	Pere Riba	164	3
ESP	Pablo Andújar	ARG	Carlos Berlocq	173	4

- Rankings are as of January 16, 2012

=== Other entrants ===
The following pairs received wildcards into the doubles main draw:

- (Brazil) Thomaz Bellucci / (Brazil) Marcelo Melo
- (Chile) Paul Capdeville / (Chile) Nicolás Massú
- (Chile) Gonzalo Lama / (Chile) Matias Sborowitz

== Finals ==
=== Singles ===
(Argentina) Juan Mónaco defeated (Argentina) Carlos Berlocq, 6–3, 6–7^{(1–7)}, 6–1

- It was Monaco's 1st title of the year and 4th of his career, and first since 2007.

=== Doubles ===
(Portugal) Frederico Gil / (Spain) Daniel Gimeno-Traver defeated (Spain) Pablo Andújar / (Argentina) Carlos Berlocq, 1–6, 7–5, [12–10]
