= 2014 Portugal Open – Men's doubles =

Men's doubles
- 2014 Portugal Open

Final
- Champion: (Mexico) Santiago González (United States) Scott Lipsky
- Runner-up: (Uruguay) Pablo Cuevas (Spain) David Marrero
- Score: 6–3, 3–6, [10–8]

Events
Singles	men	women
Doubles	men	women
← 2013 ·	Portugal Open	· 2015 →

Santiago González and Scott Lipsky were the defending champions and successfully defended their title by defeating Pablo Cuevas and David Marrero in the final, 6–3, 3–6, [10–8].

== Seeds ==
1. (Uruguay) Pablo Cuevas / (Spain) David Marrero (final)
2. (Poland) Mariusz Fyrstenberg / (Poland) Marcin Matkowski (first round)
3. (Mexico) Santiago González / (United States) Scott Lipsky (champions)
4. (Czech Republic) František Čermák / (Russia) Mikhail Elgin (quarterfinals)

== Draw ==
=== Key ===
- Q = Qualifier
- WC = Wild card
- LL = Lucky loser
- Alt = Alternate
- SE = Special exempt
- PR = Protected ranking
- ITF = ITF entry
- JE = Junior exempt
- w/o = Walkover
- r = Retired
- d = Defaulted
- SR = Special ranking

=== Draw ===
First round
1	(Uruguay) P Cuevas (Spain) D Marrero	6	6
(Romania) F Mergea (Brazil) A Sá	3	4
(India) P Raja (India) D Sharan	w/o
(Colombia) S Giraldo (Colombia) A González
4	(Czech Republic) F Čermák (Russia) M Elgin	7^{7}	6
WC	(Portugal) R Machado (Portugal) FF Silva	6^{2}	2
(Israel) J Erlich (Australia) P Hanley	2	2
(Australia) M Ebden (Russia) D Tursunov	6	6
(Russia) T Gabashvili (Kazakhstan) O Nedovyesov	6	6
(Kazakhstan) A Golubev (Kazakhstan) M Kukushkin	4	4
(Argentina) C Berlocq (Spain) P Carreño	3	3
3	(Mexico) S González (United States) S Lipsky	6	6
WC	(Portugal) G Elias (Portugal) J Sousa	1	7^{7}	[10]
(United States) N Monroe (Germany) S Stadler	6	6^{3}	[3]
(Spain) G García-López (Austria) P Oswald	7^{7}	6
2	(Poland) M Fyrstenberg (Poland) M Matkowski	6^{0}	3

Quarterfinals
1	(Uruguay) P Cuevas (Spain) D Marrero	6	6
(India) P Raja (India) D Sharan	2	2
4	(Czech Republic) F Čermák (Russia) M Elgin	7^{8}	4	[10]
(Australia) M Ebden (Russia) D Tursunov	6^{6}	6	[12]
(Russia) T Gabashvili (Kazakhstan) O Nedovyesov	3	3
3	(Mexico) S González (United States) S Lipsky	6	6
WC	(Portugal) G Elias (Portugal) J Sousa	6	6
(Spain) G García-López (Austria) P Oswald	3	1

Semifinals
1	(Uruguay) P Cuevas (Spain) D Marrero	6	6
(Australia) M Ebden (Russia) D Tursunov	4	4
3	(Mexico) S González (United States) S Lipsky	6	6
WC	(Portugal) G Elias (Portugal) J Sousa	3	3

Final
1	(Uruguay) P Cuevas (Spain) D Marrero	3	6	[8]
3	(Mexico) S González (United States) S Lipsky	6	3	[10]
