= 2011 Movistar Open – Doubles =

Doubles
- 2011 Movistar Open

Final
- Champions: (Brazil) Marcelo Melo (Brazil) Bruno Soares
- Runners-up: (Poland) Łukasz Kubot (Austria) Oliver Marach
- Score: 6–3, 7–6(3)

Events
Singles	Doubles
← 2010 ·	Movistar Open	· 2012 →

Łukasz Kubot and Oliver Marach were the defending champions. They reached the final, but lost to Marcelo Melo and Bruno Soares, 6–3, 7–6(3).

== Seeds ==
1. (Poland) Łukasz Kubot / (Austria) Oliver Marach (final)
2. (Argentina) Eduardo Schwank / (Argentina) Horacio Zeballos (semifinals)
3. (Brazil) Marcelo Melo / (Brazil) Bruno Soares (champions)
4. (Argentina) Juan Ignacio Chela / (Mexico) Santiago González (semifinals)

== Draw ==
=== Key ===
- Q = Qualifier
- WC = Wild card
- LL = Lucky loser
- Alt = Alternate
- SE = Special exempt
- PR = Protected ranking
- ITF = ITF entry
- JE = Junior exempt
- w/o = Walkover
- r = Retired
- d = Defaulted
- SR = Special ranking

=== Draw ===
First round
1	(Poland) Ł Kubot (Austria) O Marach	6	5	[11]
Alt	(Spain) A Ramos-Viñolas (Portugal) L Tavares	3	7	[9]
WC	(Chile) N Massú (Brazil) J Souza	7	7
(Italy) F Fognini (Italy) F Volandri	6^{3}	6^{7}
4	(Argentina) JI Chela (Mexico) S González	6	6
WC	(Chile) J Aguilar (Chile) P Capdeville	3	4
(Spain) D Marrero (Spain) R Ramírez Hidalgo	6	4	[10]
(Brazil) F Ferreiro (Brazil) R Mello	3	6	[6]
(Brazil) T Bellucci (Argentina) L Mayer	6	6
(United States) B Battistone (Sweden) A Siljeström	3	4
(Argentina) C Berlocq (Portugal) R Machado	1	4
3	(Brazil) M Melo (Brazil) B Soares	6	6
(Colombia) S Giraldo (Spain) D Muñoz-De La Nava	3	6^{3}
(Czech Republic) F Čermák (Czech Republic) L Friedl	6	7
(Spain) P Andújar (Italy) P Starace	3	4
2	(Argentina) E Schwank (Argentina) H Zeballos	6	6

Quarterfinals
1	(Poland) Ł Kubot (Austria) O Marach	w/o
WC	(Chile) N Massú (Brazil) J Souza
4	(Argentina) JI Chela (Mexico) S González	7	6
(Spain) D Marrero (Spain) R Ramírez Hidalgo	6^{3}	2
(Brazil) T Bellucci (Argentina) L Mayer
3	(Brazil) M Melo (Brazil) B Soares	w/o
(Czech Republic) F Čermák (Czech Republic) L Friedl	3	3
2	(Argentina) E Schwank (Argentina) H Zeballos	6	6

Semifinals
1	(Poland) Ł Kubot (Austria) O Marach	7	7
4	(Argentina) JI Chela (Mexico) S González	6^{5}	6^{6}
3	(Brazil) M Melo (Brazil) B Soares	6	7
2	(Argentina) E Schwank (Argentina) H Zeballos	4	5

Final
1	(Poland) Ł Kubot (Austria) O Marach	3	6^{3}
3	(Brazil) M Melo (Brazil) B Soares	6	7
