= 2011 Movistar Open – Singles =

Singles
- 2011 Movistar Open

Final
- Champion: (Spain) Tommy Robredo
- Runner-up: (Colombia) Santiago Giraldo
- Score: 6–2, 2–6, 7–6^{(7–5)}

Details
- Draw: 32
- Seeds: 8

Events
Singles	Doubles
- Movistar Open

Thomaz Bellucci was the defending champion, but lost to Fabio Fognini in the quarterfinals.
Tommy Robredo won the title, defeating Santiago Giraldo 6–2, 2–6, 7–6^{(7–5)}, in the final.

== Seeds ==
1. (Argentina) David Nalbandian (second round)
2. (Argentina) Juan Mónaco (first round)
3. (Brazil) Thomaz Bellucci (quarterfinals)
4. (Argentina) Juan Ignacio Chela (quarterfinals)
5. (Italy) Potito Starace (semifinals)
6. (Spain) Tommy Robredo (champion)
7. (Italy) Fabio Fognini (semifinals)
8. (Colombia) Santiago Giraldo (final)

== Draw ==
Key

- Q = Qualifier
- WC = Wild card
- LL = Lucky loser
- Alt = Alternate
- ITF = ITF entry
- PR = Protected ranking
- SR = Special ranking
- SE = Special exempt
- JE = Junior exempt
- JR = Junior Accelerator Programme entrant
- CO = College Accelerator Programme entrant
- NG = Next Gen Accelerator Program entrant
- w/o = Walkover
- r = Retired
- d = Defaulted

=== Finals ===
Semifinals
5	(Italy) Potito Starace	6	6^{2}	1
8	(Colombia) Santiago Giraldo	4	7	6
7	(Italy) Fabio Fognini	6	2	3
6	(Spain) Tommy Robredo	4	6	6

Final
8	(Colombia) Santiago Giraldo	2	6	6^{5}
6	(Spain) Tommy Robredo	6	2	7

=== Top half ===
First round
1	(Argentina) D Nalbandian	6	2	6
(Argentina) C Berlocq	2	6	2
Q	(Brazil) R Hocevar	6^{2}	4
(Argentina) H Zeballos	7	6
(Australia) P Luczak	4	4
(Spain) P Andújar	6	6
WC	(Chile) P Capdeville	6	3	4
5	(Italy) P Starace	3	6	6
4	(Argentina) JI Chela	6	7
Q	(Chile) J Aguilar	3	5
Q	(Brazil) C Zampieri	7	7
WC	(Chile) N Massú	6^{7}	5
(Argentina) E Schwank	3	6^{4}
(Russia) I Andreev	6	7
Q	(Argentina) F Bagnis	6	3	2
8	(Colombia) S Giraldo	2	6	6

Second round
1	(Argentina) D Nalbandian	2	5
(Argentina) H Zeballos	6	7
(Spain) P Andújar	4	1
5	(Italy) P Starace	6	6
4	(Argentina) JI Chela	6	6
Q	(Brazil) C Zampieri	2	3
(Russia) I Andreev	6^{7}	6	2
8	(Colombia) S Giraldo	7	4	6

Quarterfinals
(Argentina) H Zeballos	7	3	6^{2}
5	(Italy) P Starace	6^{9}	6	7
4	(Argentina) JI Chela	4	3
8	(Colombia) S Giraldo	6	6

Semifinals
5	(Italy) P Starace	6	6^{2}	1
8	(Colombia) S Giraldo	4	7	6

=== Bottom half ===
First round
7	(Italy) F Fognini	7	6
(Poland) Ł Kubot	6^{6}	2
(Argentina) L Mayer	4	4
(Spain) A Ramos Viñolas	6	6
(Portugal) R Machado	6	6
WC	(Chile) F Ríos	2	0
(Italy) F Volandri	2	2
3	(Brazil) T Bellucci	6	6
6	(Spain) T Robredo	2	6	6
(Portugal) F Gil	6	3	4
(Spain) R Ramírez Hidalgo	4	7	6^{6}
(Brazil) R Mello	6	6^{5}	7
(Brazil) J Souza	6	7
(Uruguay) P Cuevas	4	5
(Argentina) M González	6	3	6
2	(Argentina) J Mónaco	4	6	4

Second round
7	(Italy) F Fognini	3	7	6
(Spain) A Ramos Viñolas	6	5	4
(Portugal) R Machado	5	6	1
3	(Brazil) T Bellucci	7	1	6
6	(Spain) T Robredo	6	7
(Brazil) R Mello	0	6^{7}
(Brazil) J Souza	6	3	1
(Argentina) M González	4	6	6

Quarterfinals
7	(Italy) F Fognini	1	6	7
3	(Brazil) T Bellucci	6	2	6^{0}
6	(Spain) T Robredo	6	6
(Argentina) M González	3	1

Semifinals
7	(Italy) F Fognini	6	2	3
6	(Spain) T Robredo	4	6	6

== Qualifying ==
=== Seeds ===
1. (Spain) Daniel Muñoz de la Nava (second round)
2. (Brazil) Rogério Dutra Silva (first round)
3. (Argentina) Juan Pablo Brzezicki (qualifying competition)
4. (Spain) Iván Navarro (qualifying competition)
5. (Chile) Jorge Aguilar (qualified)
6. (Portugal) Leonardo Tavares (second round)
7. (Brazil) Ricardo Hocevar (qualified)
8. (Argentina) Facundo Bagnis (qualified)

=== Qualifiers ===
1. (Chile) Jorge Aguilar
2. (Brazil) Ricardo Hocevar
3. (Argentina) Facundo Bagnis
4. (Brazil) Caio Zampieri

=== Draw ===
==== First qualifier ====
First round
1	(Spain) Daniel Muñoz de la Nava	6	6
(Chile) Rodrigo Pérez	4	2
(Chile) Javier Muñoz	4	1
(Chile) Guillermo Rivera Aránguiz	6	6
(Brazil) Rafael Camilo	3	2
(Argentina) Martín Vassallo Argüello	6	6
(Chile) Nicolás Gustavo Kauer	5	2
5	(Chile) Jorge Aguilar	7	6

Second round
1	(Spain) Daniel Muñoz de la Nava	2	5
(Chile) Guillermo Rivera Aránguiz	6	7
(Argentina) Martín Vassallo Argüello	4	4
5	(Chile) Jorge Aguilar	6	6

Qualifying competition
(Chile) Guillermo Rivera Aránguiz	6	6^{2}	4
5	(Chile) Jorge Aguilar	4	7^{7}	6

==== Second qualifier ====
First round
2	(Brazil) Rogério Dutra Silva	3	6	4
(Sweden) Christian Lindell	6	4	6
(Chile) Alex Theiler	6^{5}	2
(Chile) Guillermo Hormazábal	7^{7}	6
(Chile) Víctor Núñez	2	2
(Chile) Ricardo Urzúa	6	6
WC	(Chile) Gonzalo Urruticoechea	1	2
7	(Brazil) Ricardo Hocevar	6	6

Second round
(Sweden) Christian Lindell	6^{7}	1
(Chile) Guillermo Hormazábal	7^{9}	6
(Chile) Ricardo Urzúa	6^{5}	6^{4}
7	(Brazil) Ricardo Hocevar	7^{7}	7^{7}

Qualifying competition
(Chile) Guillermo Hormazábal	0	2
7	(Brazil) Ricardo Hocevar	6	6

==== Third qualifier ====
First round
3	(Argentina) Juan Pablo Brzezicki	7^{8}	5	6
(Chile) Juan Carlos Sáez	6^{6}	7	1
(Ecuador) Juan Sebastián Vivanco	6	6
(North Macedonia) Tomislav Jotovski	1	3
(Czech Republic) František Čermák	3	7	7^{8}
WC	(Chile) Michel Vernier	6	5	6^{6}
(Chile) Cristóbal Saavedra	6^{6}	4
8	(Argentina) Facundo Bagnis	7^{8}	6

Second round
3	(Argentina) Juan Pablo Brzezicki	6	6
(Ecuador) Juan Sebastián Vivanco	1	3
(Czech Republic) František Čermák	7^{7}	0^{r}
8	(Argentina) Facundo Bagnis	6^{5}	0

Qualifying competition
3	(Argentina) Juan Pablo Brzezicki	5	4
8	(Argentina) Facundo Bagnis	7	6

==== Fourth qualifier ====
First round
4	(Spain) Iván Navarro	6	6^{5}	7^{9}
(Mexico) Santiago González	3	7^{7}	7^{7}
WC	(Chile) Gonzalo Lama	6	6
WC	(Chile) Osvaldo Aguirre	0	0
(Brazil) Caio Zampieri	6	6
(Spain) David Marrero	1	4
(Chile) Víctor Morales	2	0
6	(Portugal) Leonardo Tavares	6	6

Second round
4	(Spain) Iván Navarro	6	6
WC	(Chile) Gonzalo Lama	2	3
(Brazil) Caio Zampieri	6	2	6
6	(Portugal) Leonardo Tavares	1	6	4

Qualifying competition
4	(Spain) Iván Navarro	3	4
(Brazil) Caio Zampieri	6	6
