= 2014 Portugal Open =

- Date: 26 April – 4 May
- Edition: 25th (ATP); 18th (WTA)
- Draw: 28S / 16D; 32S / 16D
- Prize money: €426,605 $250,000
- Surface: Clay / outdoor
- Location: Oeiras, Portugal
- Venue: Estádio Nacional

Champions

Men's singles
- (Argentina) Carlos Berlocq

Women's singles
- (Spain) Carla Suárez Navarro

Men's doubles
- (Mexico) Santiago González / (United States) Scott Lipsky

Women's doubles
- (Zimbabwe) Cara Black / (India) Sania Mirza
← 2013 ·	Portugal Open	· 2015 →

The 2014 Portugal Open was a tennis tournament played on outdoor clay courts. It was the 25th edition of the Portugal Open for the men and the 18th for the women, and was part of the ATP World Tour 250 series of the 2014 ATP World Tour, and of the International-level tournaments of the 2014 WTA Tour. Both the men's and the women's events took place at the Estádio Nacional in Oeiras, Portugal, from April 26 through May 4, 2014.

== Points and prize money ==
=== Point distribution ===
Event	W	F	SF	QF	Round of 16	Round of 32	Q	Q3	Q2	Q1
Men's singles	250	150	90	45	20	0	12	6	0	0
Men's doubles	250	150	90	45	0	—	—	—	—	—
Women's singles	280	180	110	60	30	1	18	14	10	1
Women's doubles	280	180	110	60	1	—	—	—	—	—

=== Prize money ===
Event	W	F	SF	QF	Round of 16	Round of 32	Q3	Q2	Q1
Men's singles	€77,315	€40,720	€22,060	€12,565	€7,405	€4,385	€710	€340	—
Men's doubles *	€23,500	€12,350	€6,690	€3,830	€2,240	—	—	—	—
Women's singles	€34,677	€17,258	€9,113	€4,758	€2,669	€1,552	€810	€599	€427
Women's doubles *	€9,919	€5,161	€2,770	€1,468	€774	—	—	—	—

_{* per team}

== ATP singles main draw entrants ==
=== Seeds ===
Country	Player	Rank^{1}	Seed
CZE	Tomáš Berdych	6	1
CAN	Milos Raonic	9	2
ESP	Marcel Granollers	31	3
ESP	Guillermo García-López	32	4
RUS	Dmitry Tursunov	34	5
POR	João Sousa	40	6
RUS	Teymuraz Gabashvili	55	7
KAZ	Mikhail Kukushkin	57	8

- Rankings are as of April 21, 2014.

=== Other entrants ===
The following players received wildcards into the singles main draw:

- (Czech Republic) Tomáš Berdych
- (Portugal) Gastão Elias
- (Portugal) Rui Machado

The following players received entry from the qualifying draw:

- (Moldova) Radu Albot
- (Japan) Taro Daniel
- (Spain) Daniel Gimeno-Traver
- (Argentina) Leonardo Mayer

The following player received entry as lucky loser:

- (Spain) Roberto Carballés Baena

=== Withdrawals ===
Before the tournament

- (Spain) Pablo Andújar
- (Colombia) Santiago Giraldo
- (United States) Bradley Klahn
- (France) Benoît Paire (knee injury)
- (France) Édouard Roger-Vasselin
- (Switzerland) Stanislas Wawrinka

== ATP doubles main draw entrants ==
=== Seeds ===
Country	Player	Country	Player	Rank^{1}	Seed
URU	Pablo Cuevas	ESP	David Marrero	63	1
POL	Mariusz Fyrstenberg	POL	Marcin Matkowski	66	2
MEX	Santiago González	USA	Scott Lipsky	76	3
CZE	František Čermák	RUS	Mikhail Elgin	116	4

- Rankings are as of April 21, 2014.

=== Other entrants ===
The following pairs received wildcards into the doubles main draw:

- (Portugal) Gastão Elias / (Portugal) João Sousa
- (Portugal) Rui Machado / (Portugal) Frederico Ferreira Silva

=== Withdrawals ===
Before the tournament

- (Colombia) Santiago Giraldo
- (Spain) Marc López (left leg injury)

== WTA singles main draw entrants ==
=== Seeds ===
Country	Player	Rank^{1}	Seed
ESP	Carla Suárez Navarro	16	1
CAN	Eugenie Bouchard	18	2
AUS	Samantha Stosur	19	3
ITA	Roberta Vinci	20	4
EST	Kaia Kanepi	23	5
CZE	Lucie Šafářová	26	6
RUS	Svetlana Kuznetsova	29	7
RUS	Elena Vesnina	33	8

- Rankings are as of April 21, 2014.

=== Other entrants ===
The following players received wildcards into the singles main draw:

- (Canada) Eugenie Bouchard
- (Tunisia) Ons Jabeur
- (Portugal) Maria João Koehler

The following players received entry from the qualifying draw:

- (Switzerland) Timea Bacsinszky
- (Romania) Irina-Camelia Begu
- (Russia) Alla Kudryavtseva
- (France) Kristina Mladenovic

=== Withdrawals ===
Before the tournament

- (Romania) Sorana Cîrstea → replaced by Urszula Radwańska
- (France) Alizé Cornet (adductor strain) → replaced by Yanina Wickmayer
- (Slovakia) Daniela Hantuchová → replaced by Polona Hercog
- (Czech Republic) Klára Koukalová → replaced by Yaroslava Shvedova
- (Russia) Maria Kirilenko → replaced by Karin Knapp
- (United States) Varvara Lepchenko → replaced by Monica Puig
- (Russia) Anastasia Pavlyuchenkova → replaced by Alexandra Cadanțu
- (United States) Alison Riske → replaced by Stefanie Vögele
- (Italy) Francesca Schiavone → replaced by Barbora Záhlavová-Strýcová

== WTA doubles main draw entrants ==
=== Seeds ===
Country	Player	Country	Player	Rank^{1}	Seed
ZIM	Cara Black	IND	Sania Mirza	11	1
ESP	Anabel Medina Garrigues	ESP	Arantxa Parra Santonja	66	2
USA	Liezel Huber	USA	Lisa Raymond	78	3
SVK	Janette Husárová	CZE	Barbora Záhlavová-Strýcová	81	4

- Rankings are as of April 21, 2014.

=== Other entrants ===
The following pairs received wildcards into the doubles main draw:

- (Portugal) Maria João Koehler / (Spain) María Teresa Torró Flor
- (Russia) Ekaterina Lopes / (Portugal) Bárbara Luz

=== Withdrawals ===
During the tournament

- (Spain) María Teresa Torró Flor (left harmstring injury)

== Finals ==
=== Men's singles ===
- (Argentina) Carlos Berlocq defeated (Czech Republic) Tomáš Berdych, 0–6, 7–5, 6–1

=== Women's singles ===
- (Spain) Carla Suárez Navarro defeated (Russia) Svetlana Kuznetsova, 6–4, 3–6, 6–4

=== Men's doubles ===
- (Mexico) Santiago González / (United States) Scott Lipsky defeated (Uruguay) Pablo Cuevas / (Spain) David Marrero, 6–3, 3–6, [10–8]

=== Women's doubles ===
- (Zimbabwe) Cara Black / (India) Sania Mirza defeated (Czech Republic) Eva Hrdinová / (Russia) Valeria Solovyeva, 6–4, 6–3
