= 2012 VTR Open – Doubles =

Doubles
- 2012 VTR Open

Final
- Champions: (Portugal) Frederico Gil (Spain) Daniel Gimeno-Traver
- Runners-up: (Spain) Pablo Andújar (Argentina) Carlos Berlocq
- Score: 1–6, 7–5, [12–10]

Events
Singles	Doubles
← 2011 ·	VTR Open	· 2013 →

Marcelo Melo and Bruno Soares are the defending doubles champions. However this year they didn't participate together. Melo participated with Thomaz Bellucci, while Soares formed a team with André Sá. Melo and Bellucci lost in the quarterfinals to Pablo Andújar and Carlos Berlocq. Soares and lost in the quarterfinals to Santiago Giraldo and Máximo González. Frederico Gil and Daniel Gimeno-Traver took the title after defeating Andújar and Berlocq 1–6, 7–5, [12–10] in the final.

== Seeds ==
1. (Brazil) André Sá / (Brazil) Bruno Soares (quarterfinals)
2. (Colombia) Juan Sebastián Cabal / (Colombia) Robert Farah (quarterfinals)
3. (Spain) David Marrero / (Spain) Pere Riba (quarterfinals)
4. (Spain) Pablo Andújar / (Argentina) Carlos Berlocq (final)

== Draw ==
=== Key ===
- Q = Qualifier
- WC = Wild card
- LL = Lucky loser
- Alt = Alternate
- SE = Special exempt
- PR = Protected ranking
- ITF = ITF entry
- JE = Junior exempt
- w/o = Walkover
- r = Retired
- d = Defaulted
- SR = Special ranking

=== Draw ===
First round
1	(Brazil) A Sá (Brazil) B Soares	5	6	[10]
(Russia) I Andreev (France) J Chardy	7	3	[8]
(Colombia) S Giraldo (Argentina) M González	7^{9}	6
(Brazil) R Dutra da Silva (Argentina) D Junqueira	6^{7}	2
3	(Spain) D Marrero (Spain) P Riba	6	6
WC	(Chile) G Lama (Chile) M Sborowitz	1	2
(Portugal) F Gil (Spain) D Gimeno-Traver	6	7^{7}
(Argentina) L Mayer (Spain) R Ramírez Hidalgo	2	6^{1}
(Spain) A Montañés (Spain) I Navarro	4	2
WC	(Brazil) T Bellucci (Brazil) M Melo	6	6
(France) É Prodon (Romania) A Ungur	2	6	[7]
4	(Spain) P Andújar (Argentina) C Berlocq	6	3	[10]
(Brazil) J Souza (Argentina) H Zeballos	7	4	[10]
WC	(Chile) P Capdeville (Chile) N Massú	5	6	[5]
(Italy) P Lorenzi (Italy) F Volandri	2	7	[6]
2	(Colombia) JS Cabal (Colombia) R Farah	6	5	[10]

Quarterfinals
1	(Brazil) A Sá (Brazil) B Soares	4	4
(Colombia) S Giraldo (Argentina) M González	6	6
3	(Spain) D Marrero (Spain) P Riba	7	4	[6]
(Portugal) F Gil (Spain) D Gimeno-Traver	6^{5}	6	[10]
WC	(Brazil) T Bellucci (Brazil) M Melo	4	6^{7}
4	(Spain) P Andújar (Argentina) C Berlocq	6	7^{9}
(Brazil) J Souza (Argentina) H Zeballos	7^{8}	2	[10]
2	(Colombia) JS Cabal (Colombia) R Farah	6^{6}	6	[7]

Semifinals
(Colombia) S Giraldo (Argentina) M González	6^{4}	6	[3]
(Portugal) F Gil (Spain) D Gimeno-Traver	7^{7}	3	[10]
4	(Spain) P Andújar (Argentina) C Berlocq	3	6	[10]
(Brazil) J Souza (Argentina) H Zeballos	6	4	[6]

Final
(Portugal) F Gil (Spain) D Gimeno-Traver	1	7	[12]
4	(Spain) P Andújar (Argentina) C Berlocq	6	5	[10]
