= 2012 VTR Open – Singles =

Singles
- 2012 VTR Open

Final
- Champion: (Argentina) Juan Mónaco
- Runner-up: (Argentina) Carlos Berlocq
- Score: 6–3, 6–7^{(1–7)}, 6–1

Details
- Draw: 28
- Seeds: 8

Events
Singles	Doubles
- VTR Open

Tommy Robredo was the defending champion but withdrew due to leg injury.

Two points scored during the match

First-seeded Juan Mónaco beat seventh-seeded Carlos Berlocq 6–3, 6–7^{(1–7)}, 6–1 to take the 2012 title.

== Seeds ==
The top four seeds received a bye into the second round.

1. (Argentina) Juan Mónaco (champion)
2. (Argentina) Juan Ignacio Chela (semifinals)
3. (Brazil) Thomaz Bellucci (second round)
4. (Spain) Pablo Andújar (second round)
5. (Spain) Albert Montañés (quarterfinals)
6. (Colombia) Santiago Giraldo (first round)
7. (Argentina) Carlos Berlocq (final)
8. (Italy) Filippo Volandri (first round)

== Draw ==
Key

- Q = Qualifier
- WC = Wild card
- LL = Lucky loser
- Alt = Alternate
- ITF = ITF entry
- PR = Protected ranking
- SR = Special ranking
- SE = Special exempt
- JE = Junior exempt
- JR = Junior Accelerator Programme entrant
- CO = College Accelerator Programme entrant
- NG = Next Gen Accelerator Program entrant
- w/o = Walkover
- r = Retired
- d = Defaulted

=== Finals ===
Semifinals
1	(Argentina) Juan Mónaco	6	6
(France) Jérémy Chardy	1	4
7	(Argentina) Carlos Berlocq	6	4	6
2	(Argentina) Juan Ignacio Chela	3	6	0

Final
1	(Argentina) Juan Mónaco	6	6^{1}	6
7	(Argentina) Carlos Berlocq	3	7^{7}	1

=== Top half ===
First round
WC	(Chile) P Capdeville	6	3	4
(Russia) I Andreev	3	6	6
Q	(Brazil) R Dutra da Silva	0	7^{7}	6
(Argentina) M González	6	6^{3}	3
Q	(Spain) R Ramírez Hidalgo	2	4
5	(Spain) A Montañés	6	6
(Portugal) F Gil	6	5	6
(Italy) P Lorenzi	3	7	1
(France) J Chardy	6	6
(France) É Prodon	4	3
(Argentina) L Mayer	7^{7}	6
6	(Colombia) S Giraldo	6^{5}	1

Second round
1	(Argentina) J Mónaco	6	6
(Russia) I Andreev	2	1
Q	(Brazil) R Dutra da Silva	5	2
5	(Spain) A Montañés	7	6
4	(Spain) P Andújar	2	1
(Portugal) F Gil	6	6
(France) J Chardy	7	6
(Argentina) L Mayer	5	2

Quarterfinals
1	(Argentina) J Mónaco	3	6	6
5	(Spain) A Montañés	6	1	1
(Portugal) F Gil	2	6^{5}
(France) J Chardy	6	7^{7}

Semifinals
1	(Argentina) J Mónaco	6	6
(France) J Chardy	1	4

=== Bottom half ===
First round
7	(Argentina) C Berlocq	7	6
(Spain) D Gimeno Traver	5	0
(Brazil) R Mello	4	2
Q	(Argentina) D Junqueira	6	6
WC	(Chile) N Massú	0	3
Q	(Argentina) F Delbonis	6	6
8	(Italy) F Volandri	6	5	6^{5}
(Brazil) J Souza	1	7	7^{7}
WC	(Chile) F González	6	6
(Spain) P Riba	4	4
(Argentina) H Zeballos	6	7
(Romania) A Ungur	0	5

Second round
7	(Argentina) C Berlocq	6	6
Q	(Argentina) D Junqueira	1	0
Q	(Argentina) F Delbonis	6	7
3	(Brazil) T Bellucci	2	5
(Brazil) J Souza	6	7^{8}
WC	(Chile) F González	3	6^{6}
(Argentina) H Zeballos	4	6^{2}
2	(Argentina) JI Chela	6	7^{7}

Quarterfinals
7	(Argentina) C Berlocq	6	6
Q	(Argentina) F Delbonis	3	4
(Brazil) J Souza	7	6^{6}	1
2	(Argentina) JI Chela	5	7^{8}	6

Semifinals
7	(Argentina) C Berlocq	6	4	6
2	(Argentina) JI Chela	3	6	0

== Qualifying ==
=== Seeds ===
1. (Brazil) Rogério Dutra da Silva (qualified)
2. (Argentina) Diego Junqueira (qualified)
3. (Spain) Rubén Ramírez Hidalgo (qualified)
4. (Italy) Alessandro Giannessi (first round)
5. (Argentina) Eduardo Schwank (qualifying competition)
6. (Argentina) Facundo Bagnis (first round)
7. (Portugal) Gastão Elias (first round)
8. (Argentina) Federico Delbonis (qualified)

=== Qualifiers ===
1. (Brazil) Rogério Dutra da Silva
2. (Argentina) Diego Junqueira
3. (Spain) Rubén Ramírez Hidalgo
4. (Argentina) Federico Delbonis

== Qualifying draw ==
=== First qualifier ===
First round
1	(Brazil) Rogério Dutra da Silva	6	6^{8}	6
(Argentina) Diego Sebastián Schwartzman	0	7^{10}	4
(Argentina) Pablo Galdón	5	6	6
WC	(Chile) Gonzalo Lama	7	4	4
(Argentina) Nicolás Pastor	2	2
(Argentina) Andrés Molteni	6	6
(Spain) Iván Navarro	6	4	6
7	(Portugal) Gastão Elias	3	6	3

Second round
1	(Brazil) Rogério Dutra da Silva	6	6
(Argentina) Pablo Galdón	2	2
(Argentina) Andrés Molteni	3	4
(Spain) Iván Navarro	6	6

Qualifying competition
1	(Brazil) Rogério Dutra da Silva	6	6
(Spain) Iván Navarro	2	4

=== Second qualifier ===
First round
2	(Argentina) Diego Junqueira	7^{7}	6
(Argentina) Guido Pella	6^{5}	4
(Italy) Federico Gaio	6	4	2
(Colombia) Robert Farah	4	6	6
WC	(Chile) Matías Sborowitz	0	7^{7}	2
(Chile) Cristóbal Saavedra Corvalán	6	6^{4}	6
(Argentina) Guillermo Durán	3	1
5	(Argentina) Eduardo Schwank	6	6

Second round
2	(Argentina) Diego Junqueira	6	6
(Colombia) Robert Farah	4	3
(Chile) Cristóbal Saavedra Corvalán	4	1
5	(Argentina) Eduardo Schwank	6	6

Qualifying competition
2	(Argentina) Diego Junqueira	6	7^{7}
5	(Argentina) Eduardo Schwank	4	6^{4}

=== Third qualifier ===
First round
3	(Spain) Rubén Ramírez Hidalgo	6	6
WC	(Chile) Nicolas Gustavo Kauer	0	1
(Argentina) Guido Andreozzi	6^{4}	2
(Argentina) Martín Alund	7^{7}	6
(Chile) Jorge Aguilar	6	3	5
(Argentina) Marco Trungelliti	2	6	7
(Argentina) Juan Pablo Brzezicki	6	6
6	(Argentina) Facundo Bagnis	1	4

Second round
3	(Spain) Rubén Ramírez Hidalgo	7^{7}	3	6
(Argentina) Martín Alund	6^{4}	6	3
(Argentina) Marco Trungelliti	6^{6}	1
(Argentina) Juan Pablo Brzezicki	7^{8}	6

Qualifying competition
3	(Spain) Rubén Ramírez Hidalgo	6	6
(Argentina) Juan Pablo Brzezicki	4	0

=== Fourth qualifier ===
First round
4	(Italy) Alessandro Giannessi	6	3	6^{2}
(Chile) Guillermo Hormazábal	4	6	7^{7}
(Argentina) Facundo Argüello	6	6
WC	(Chile) Juan Carlos Sáez	3	4
(Colombia) Juan Sebastián Cabal	7	7^{7}
(Chile) Guillermo Rivera Aránguiz	5	6^{5}
(Spain) Javier Muñoz	1	0
8	(Argentina) Federico Delbonis	6	6

Second round
(Chile) Guillermo Hormazábal	6^{5}	4
(Argentina) Facundo Argüello	7^{7}	6
(Colombia) Juan Sebastián Cabal	1	7^{7}	6^{3}
8	(Argentina) Federico Delbonis	6	6^{5}	7^{7}

Qualifying competition
(Argentina) Facundo Argüello	2	2
8	(Argentina) Federico Delbonis	6	6
