= 2014 Portugal Open – Men's singles =

Men's singles
- 2014 Portugal Open

Final
- Champion: (Argentina) Carlos Berlocq
- Runner-up: (Czech Republic) Tomáš Berdych
- Score: 0–6, 7–5, 6–1

Events
Singles	men	women
Doubles	men	women
← 2013 ·	Portugal Open	· 2015 →

Stanislas Wawrinka was the defending champion, but withdrew before the event started.
Carlos Berlocq won the title, defeating Tomáš Berdych in the final, 0–6, 7–5, 6–1.

== Seeds ==
The top four seeds receive a bye into the second round.

1. (Czech Republic) Tomáš Berdych (final)
2. (Canada) Milos Raonic (quarterfinals)
3. (Spain) Marcel Granollers (quarterfinals)
4. (Spain) Guillermo García López (second round)
5. (Russia) Dmitry Tursunov (first round)
6. (Portugal) João Sousa (first round)
7. (Russia) Teymuraz Gabashvili (first round)
8. (Kazakhstan) Mikhail Kukushkin (first round)

== Draw ==
=== Key ===
- Q = Qualifier
- WC = Wild card
- LL = Lucky loser
- Alt = Alternate
- SE = Special exempt
- PR = Protected ranking
- ITF = ITF entry
- JE = Junior exempt
- w/o = Walkover
- r = Retired
- d = Defaulted
- SR = Special ranking

=== Finals ===
Semifinals
1/WC	(Czech Republic) Tomáš Berdych	6	6
(Romania) Victor Hănescu	2	2
Q	(Spain) Daniel Gimeno Traver	6^{6}	2
(Argentina) Carlos Berlocq	7^{8}	6

Final
1/WC	(Czech Republic) Tomáš Berdych	6	5	1
(Argentina) Carlos Berlocq	0	7	6

=== Top half ===
First round
(India) S Devvarman	6	6
(Australia) M Ebden	2	3
(France) A Mannarino	3	6	4
(Kazakhstan) A Golubev	6	3	6
Q	(Argentina) L Mayer	3	6	6
6	(Portugal) J Sousa	6	1	2
(Italy) F Volandri	4	3
WC	(Portugal) G Elias	6	6
(Romania) V Hănescu	3	6	6
Q	(Moldova) R Albot	6	4	4
(Spain) P Carreño Busta	6	7^{7}
8	(Kazakhstan) M Kukushkin	1	6^{3}

Second round
1/WC	(Czech Republic) T Berdych	6	6
(India) S Devvarman	3	2
(Kazakhstan) A Golubev	1	6^{3}
Q	(Argentina) L Mayer	6	7^{7}
4	(Spain) G García López	4	6	2
WC	(Portugal) G Elias	6	3	6
(Romania) V Hănescu	6	4	6
(Spain) P Carreño Busta	3	6	3

Quarterfinals
1/WC	(Czech Republic) T Berdych	3	6	6
Q	(Argentina) L Mayer	6	4	4
WC	(Portugal) G Elias	1	5
(Romania) V Hănescu	6	7

Semifinals
1/WC	(Czech Republic) T Berdych	6	6
(Romania) V Hănescu	2	2

=== Bottom half ===
First round
5	(Russia) D Tursunov	0	0
WC	(Portugal) R Machado	6	6
(Colombia) A González	4	1
Q	(Spain) D Gimeno Traver	6	6
(Spain) A Montañés	7^{7}	6
LL	(Spain) R Carballés Baena	6^{4}	3
7	(Russia) T Gabashvili	3	5
(Poland) Ł Kubot	6	7
(Argentina) C Berlocq	6	6
Q	(Japan) T Daniel	3	2
(Kazakhstan) A Nedovyesov	6	3	4
PR	(Uruguay) P Cuevas	4	6	6

Second round
WC	(Portugal) R Machado	3	6^{2}
Q	(Spain) D Gimeno Traver	6	7^{7}
(Spain) A Montañés	6	6^{5}	2
3	(Spain) M Granollers	3	7^{7}	6
(Poland) Ł Kubot	4	3
(Argentina) C Berlocq	6	6
PR	(Uruguay) P Cuevas	3	2
2	(Canada) M Raonic	6	6

Quarterfinals
Q	(Spain) D Gimeno Traver	6	6
3	(Spain) M Granollers	1	2
(Argentina) C Berlocq	7	6
2	(Canada) M Raonic	5	4

Semifinals
Q	(Spain) D Gimeno Traver	6^{6}	2
(Argentina) C Berlocq	7^{8}	6

== Qualifying ==
=== Seeds ===
1. (Argentina) Leonardo Mayer (qualified)
2. (Spain) Daniel Gimeno Traver (qualified)
3. (Moldova) Radu Albot (qualified)
4. (Japan) Taro Daniel (qualified)
5. (Spain) Roberto Carballés Baena (qualifying competition, lucky loser)
6. (Belgium) Niels Desein (qualifying competition)
7. (Spain) Jordi Samper Montaña (qualifying competition)
8. (Romania) Victor Crivoi (qualifying competition)

=== Qualifiers ===
1. (Argentina) Leonardo Mayer
2. (Spain) Daniel Gimeno Traver
3. (Moldova) Radu Albot
4. (Japan) Taro Daniel

=== Lucky losers ===
1. (Spain) Roberto Carballés Baena

=== Qualifying draw ===
==== First qualifier ====
First round
1	(Argentina) Leonardo Mayer	7^{7}	7^{7}
(Austria) Philipp Oswald	6^{5}	6^{2}
WC	(Portugal) Duarte Vale	6^{7}	6	6
WC	(Portugal) Felipe Cunha e Silva	7^{9}	4	3
(Russia) Karen Khachanov	6	6
(Portugal) José-Ricardo Nunes	1	3
(Portugal) João Domingues	6	2	0
5	(Spain) Roberto Carballés Baena	2	6	6

Second round
1	(Argentina) Leonardo Mayer	6	6
WC	(Portugal) Duarte Vale	3	1
(Russia) Karen Khachanov	1	2
5	(Spain) Roberto Carballés Baena	6	6

Qualifying competition
1	(Argentina) Leonardo Mayer	1	6	6
5	(Spain) Roberto Carballés Baena	6	3	1

==== Second qualifier ====
First round
2	(Spain) Daniel Gimeno Traver	6	6
(Italy) Alessandro Petrone	1	1
(Russia) Mikhail Elgin	2	7^{7}	6^{4}
(Portugal) André Gaspar Murta	6	6^{5}	7^{7}
(Portugal) Gonçalo Falcão	5	6	0
WC	(Portugal) Gonçalo Pereira	7	3	6
(Germany) Steven Moneke	4	3
6	(Belgium) Niels Desein	6	6

Second round
2	(Spain) Daniel Gimeno Traver	6	6
(Portugal) André Gaspar Murta	4	0
WC	(Portugal) Gonçalo Pereira	2	0
6	(Belgium) Niels Desein	6	6

Qualifying competition
2	(Spain) Daniel Gimeno Traver	6	6
6	(Belgium) Niels Desein	0	3

==== Third qualifier ====
First round
3	(Moldova) Radu Albot	4	6	6
WC	(Portugal) Eduardo Lameiras	6	2	2
(Portugal) Frederico Gil	6	6^{7}	6
(Spain) Daniel Muñoz de la Nava	4	7^{9}	4
(Portugal) Frederico Ferreira Silva	3	3
(Spain) David Vega Hernández	6	6
(Russia) Alexander Zhurbin	3	2
8	(Romania) Victor Crivoi	6	6

Second round
3	(Moldova) Radu Albot	6	3	7^{7}
(Portugal) Frederico Gil	1	6	6^{4}
(Spain) David Vega Hernández	4	6^{4}
8	(Romania) Victor Crivoi	6	7^{7}

Qualifying competition
3	(Moldova) Radu Albot	6	6
8	(Romania) Victor Crivoi	1	3

==== Fourth qualifier ====
First round
4	(Japan) Taro Daniel	6	6
(Portugal) Romain Barbosa	3	2
(Portugal) Henrique Sousa	0	2
(Serbia) Peđa Krstin	6	6
(Spain) Oriol Roca Batalla	6	3	6
(Spain) Pol Toledo Bagué	4	6	3
(Portugal) Vasco Mensurado	5	0
7	(Spain) Jordi Samper Montaña	7	6

Second round
4	(Japan) Taro Daniel	7^{7}	6
(Serbia) Peđa Krstin	6^{3}	3
(Spain) Oriol Roca Batalla	2	2
7	(Spain) Jordi Samper Montaña	6	6

Qualifying competition
4	(Japan) Taro Daniel	6	6
7	(Spain) Jordi Samper Montaña	4	2
