= 2016 Advantage Cars Prague Open =

Tennis tournament in the Czech Republic

- Date: 25–31 July
- Edition: 23rd (men); 12th (women)
- Category: ATP Challenger Tour; ITF Women's Circuit
- Prize money: €42,500 (men) $75,000 (women)
- Surface: Clay
- Location: Prague, Czech Republic
- Venue: I. Czech Lawn Tennis Club

Champions

Men's singles
- (Colombia) Santiago Giraldo

Women's singles
- (Germany) Antonia Lottner

Men's doubles
- (Austria) Julian Knowle / (Slovakia) Igor Zelenay

Women's doubles
- (Netherlands) Demi Schuurs / (Czech Republic) Renata Voráčová
- Advantage Cars Prague Open

The 2016 Advantage Cars Prague Open, also known as Advantage Cars Prague Open by Zenova for sponsorship reasons, was a professional tennis tournament played on outdoor clay courts. It was the 23rd edition, for men, and 12th edition, for women, of the tournament and part of the 2016 ATP Challenger Tour and the 2016 ITF Women's Circuit, offering totals of €42,500, for men, and $50,000, for women, in prize money. It took place in Prague, Czech Republic, on 25–31 July 2016.

== Men's singles main draw entrants ==
=== Seeds ===
Country	Player	Rank^{1}	Seed
SVK	Martin Kližan	28	1
MDA	Radu Albot	89	2
GEO	Nikoloz Basilashvili	123	3
SVK	Jozef Kovalík	126	4
ESP	Daniel Gimeno-Traver	131	5
COL	Santiago Giraldo	150	6
SUI	Henri Laaksonen	165	7
ARG	Facundo Argüello	173	8

- ^{1} Rankings as of 18 July 2016.

=== Other entrants ===
The following player received a wildcard into the singles main draw:

- (Slovakia) Martin Kližan
- (Czech Republic) Václav Šafránek
- (Czech Republic) David Šimůnek
- (Czech Republic) Lukáš Vejvara

The following players received entry from the qualifying draw:

- (Poland) Hubert Hurkacz
- (Ukraine) Vadym Ursu
- (Czech Republic) Matěj Vocel
- (Slovakia) Igor Zelenay

== Women's singles main draw entrants ==
=== Seeds ===
Country	Player	Rank^{1}	Seed
GER	Mona Barthel	79	1
CZE	Denisa Allertová	83	2
ITA	Karin Knapp	85	3
GER	Carina Witthöft	94	4
UKR	Kateryna Kozlova	96	5
RUS	Evgeniya Rodina	104	6
RUS	Elizaveta Kulichkova	115	7
ESP	Sílvia Soler Espinosa	127	8

- ^{1} Rankings as of 18 July 2016.

=== Other entrants ===
The following player received a wildcard into the singles main draw:

- (Czech Republic) Simona Heinová
- (Czech Republic) Andrea Hlaváčková
- (Czech Republic) Karolína Muchová
- (Poland) Katarzyna Piter

The following players received entry from the qualifying draw:

- (Russia) Ekaterina Alexandrova
- (Russia) Anastasiya Komardina
- (Germany) Antonia Lottner
- (Slovakia) Rebecca Šramková

The following player received entry by a lucky loser spot:

- (Italy) Martina Di Giuseppe

== Champions ==
=== Men's singles ===
- (Colombia) Santiago Giraldo def. (Belarus) Uladzimir Ignatik, 6–4, 3–6, 7–6^{(7–2)}

=== Women's singles ===
- (Germany) Antonia Lottner def. (Germany) Carina Witthöft, 7–6^{(8–6)}, 1–6, 7–5

=== Men's doubles ===
- (Austria) Julian Knowle / (Slovakia) Igor Zelenay def. (Argentina) Facundo Argüello / (Chile) Julio Peralta, 6–4, 7–5

=== Women's doubles ===
- (Netherlands) Demi Schuurs / (Czech Republic) Renata Voráčová def. (Spain) Sílvia Soler Espinosa / (Spain) Sara Sorribes Tormo, 7–5, 3–6, [10–4]
