= 2014 Portugal Open – Women's doubles =

Women's doubles
- 2014 Portugal Open

Final
- Champions: (Zimbabwe) Cara Black (India) Sania Mirza
- Runners-up: (Czech Republic) Eva Hrdinová (Russia) Valeria Solovyeva
- Score: 6–4, 6–3

Events
| Singles | men | women |
| Doubles | men | women |
| ← 2013 · | Portugal Open |

Chan Hao-ching and Kristina Mladenovic were the defending champions, but they decided not to participate.
Cara Black and Sania Mirza won the title, defeating Eva Hrdinová and Valeria Solovyeva in the final, 6–4, 6–3.

== Seeds ==
1. (Zimbabwe) Cara Black / (India) Sania Mirza (champions)
2. (Spain) Anabel Medina Garrigues / (Spain) Arantxa Parra Santonja (quarterfinals)
3. (United States) Liezel Huber / (United States) Lisa Raymond (semifinals)
4. (Slovakia) Janette Husárová / (Czech Republic) Barbora Záhlavová-Strýcová (first round)

== Draw ==
=== Key ===
- Q = Qualifier
- WC = Wild card
- LL = Lucky loser
- Alt = Alternate
- SE = Special exempt
- PR = Protected ranking
- ITF = ITF entry
- JE = Junior exempt
- w/o = Walkover
- r = Retired
- d = Defaulted
- SR = Special ranking

=== Draw ===
First round
1 | (Zimbabwe) C Black (India) S Mirza | 4 | 6 | [10]
(Romania) I-C Begu (Argentina) M Irigoyen | 6 | 2 | [5]
(Portugal) MJ Koehler (Spain) MT Torró Flor
(Spain) S Soler Espinosa (China) S Zhang | w/o
3 | (United States) L Huber (United States) L Raymond | 6 | 6
WC | (Russia) E Lopes (Portugal) B Luz | 1 | 2
(Germany) K Barrois (Canada) S Fichman | 6 | 6
(Ukraine) I Buryachok (Russia) V Diatchenko | 4 | 3
(Canada) G Dabrowski (Poland) A Rosolska | 2 | 7^{7} | [6]
(Czech Republic) E Hrdinová (Russia) V Solovyeva | 6 | 6^{3} | [10]
(Austria) S Klemenschits (Slovenia) A Klepač | 3 | 6 | [10]
4 | (Slovakia) J Husárová (Czech Republic) B Záhlavová-Strýcová | 6 | 4 | [8]
(Poland) K Jans-Ignacik (Ukraine) M Zanevska | 7 | 6
(Belarus) O Govortsova (Georgia (country)) O Kalashnikova | 5 | 2
(Croatia) D Jurak (United States) M Moulton-Levy | 4 | 1
2 | (Spain) A Medina Garrigues (Spain) A Parra Santonja | 6 | 6

Quarterfinals
1 | (Zimbabwe) C Black (India) S Mirza | 6 | 6
(Spain) S Soler Espinosa (China) S Zhang | 3 | 4
3 | (United States) L Huber (United States) L Raymond | 6 | 6
(Germany) K Barrois (Canada) S Fichman | 4 | 3
(Czech Republic) E Hrdinová (Russia) V Solovyeva | 6 | 5 | [10]
(Austria) S Klemenschits (Slovenia) A Klepač | 4 | 7 | [3]
(Poland) K Jans-Ignacik (Ukraine) M Zanevska | 6 | 6
2 | (Spain) A Medina Garrigues (Spain) A Parra Santonja | 2 | 2

Semifinals
1 | (Zimbabwe) C Black (India) S Mirza | 6 | 6
3 | (United States) L Huber (United States) L Raymond | 4 | 3
(Czech Republic) E Hrdinová (Russia) V Solovyeva | 6 | 7
(Poland) K Jans-Ignacik (Ukraine) M Zanevska | 4 | 5

Final
1 | (Zimbabwe) C Black (India) S Mirza | 6 | 6
(Czech Republic) E Hrdinová (Russia) V Solovyeva | 4 | 3
