= 2016 Advantage Cars Prague Open – Men's doubles =

Men's doubles
- 2016 Advantage Cars Prague Open

Final
- Champion: (Austria) Julian Knowle (Slovakia) Igor Zelenay
- Runner-up: (Argentina) Facundo Argüello (Chile) Julio Peralta
- Score: 6–4, 7–5

Events
Singles	men	women
Doubles	men	women
- Advantage Cars Prague Open

The men's doubles of the 2016 Advantage Cars Prague Open tournament was played on clay in Prague, Czech Republic.

Wesley Koolhof and Matwé Middelkoop were the defending champions but chose not to defend their title.

Julian Knowle and Igor Zelenay won the title after defeating Facundo Argüello and Julio Peralta 6–4, 7–5 in the final.

== Seeds ==
1. (Austria) Julian Knowle / (Slovakia) Igor Zelenay (champions)
2. (Argentina) Facundo Argüello / (Chile) Julio Peralta (final)
3. (Poland) Tomasz Bednarek / (United States) Max Schnur (semifinals)
4. (Austria) Maximilian Neuchrist / (Austria) Tristan-Samuel Weissborn (quarterfinals)

== Draw ==
Key

- Q = Qualifier
- WC = Wild card
- LL = Lucky loser
- Alt = Alternate
- ITF = ITF entry
- PR = Protected ranking
- SR = Special ranking
- SE = Special exempt
- JE = Junior exempt
- JR = Junior Accelerator Programme entrant
- CO = College Accelerator Programme entrant
- NG = Next Gen Accelerator Program entrant
- w/o = Walkover
- r = Retired
- d = Defaulted

First round
1	(Austria) J Knowle (Slovakia) I Zelenay	6	6
(Czech Republic) R Jebavý (Czech Republic) J Šátral	4	0
WC	(Czech Republic) David Šimůnek (Czech Republic) T Zíb	4	6	[9]
(Croatia) T Draganja (Sweden) M Sekulic	6	3	[11]
3	(Poland) T Bednarek (United States) M Schnur	6	6
(Austria) D Novak (Portugal) FF Silva	2	2
(Sweden) I Arvidsson (Sweden) F Simonsson	7^{7}	2	[7]
(Sweden) Daniel Appelgren (Sweden) P Rosenholm	6^{2}	6	[10]
(Czech Republic) J Mertl (Slovenia) B Rola	0	4
(Czech Republic) M Michalička (Czech Republic) Libor Salaba	6	6
(Czech Republic) L Dlouhý (Germany) F Moser	1	3
4	(Austria) M Neuchrist (Austria) T-S Weissborn	6	6
WC	(Czech Republic) J Hernych (Czech Republic) Lukáš Vejvara	6	2	[10]
WC	(Brazil) A Ghem (Netherlands) S Groen	3	6	[6]
(Czech Republic) Z Kolář (Czech Republic) M Vocel	4	2
2	(Argentina) F Argüello (Chile) J Peralta	6	6

Quarterfinals
1	(Austria) J Knowle (Slovakia) I Zelenay	6	6
(Croatia) T Draganja (Sweden) M Sekulic	3	3
3	(Poland) T Bednarek (United States) M Schnur	4	6	[10]
(Sweden) D Appelgren (Sweden) P Rosenholm	6	2	[6]
(Czech Republic) M Michalička (Czech Republic) L Salaba	0	6	[10]
4	(Austria) M Neuchrist (Austria) T-S Weissborn	6	3	[6]
WC	(Czech Republic) J Hernych (Czech Republic) L Vejvara	0	1
2	(Argentina) F Argüello (Chile) J Peralta	6	6

Semifinals
1	(Austria) J Knowle (Slovakia) I Zelenay	6	6
3	(Poland) T Bednarek (United States) M Schnur	4	3
(Czech Republic) M Michalička (Czech Republic) L Salaba	4	0
2	(Argentina) F Argüello (Chile) J Peralta	6	6

Final
1	(Austria) J Knowle (Slovakia) I Zelenay	6	7
2	(Argentina) F Argüello (Chile) J Peralta	4	5
