= 2016 Advantage Cars Prague Open – Women's doubles =

Women's doubles
- 2016 Advantage Cars Prague Open

Final
- Champions: (Netherlands) Demi Schuurs (Czech Republic) Renata Voráčová
- Runners-up: (Spain) Sílvia Soler Espinosa (Spain) Sara Sorribes Tormo
- Score: 7–5, 3–6, [10–4]

Events
Singles	men	women
Doubles	men	women
- Advantage Cars Prague Open

The women's doubles of the 2016 Advantage Cars Prague Open tournament was played on clay in Prague, Czech Republic.

Kateřina Kramperová and Bernarda Pera were the defending champions, but Pera chose not to participate. Kramperová partnered Amandine Hesse, but they lost in the first round.

Demi Schuurs and Renata Voráčová won the title, defeating Sílvia Soler Espinosa and Sara Sorribes Tormo in the final, 7–5, 3–6, [10–4].

== Seeds ==
1. (Czech Republic) Andrea Hlaváčková / (Czech Republic) Lucie Hradecká (withdrew)
2. (Netherlands) Demi Schuurs / (Czech Republic) Renata Voráčová (champions)
3. (Czech Republic) Lenka Kunčíková / (Czech Republic) Karolína Stuchlá (quarterfinals)
4. (Sweden) Rebecca Peterson / (United Kingdom) Anna Smith (quarterfinals)

== Draw ==
Key

- Q = Qualifier
- WC = Wild card
- LL = Lucky loser
- Alt = Alternate
- ITF = ITF entry
- PR = Protected ranking
- SR = Special ranking
- SE = Special exempt
- JE = Junior exempt
- JR = Junior Accelerator Programme entrant
- CO = College Accelerator Programme entrant
- NG = Next Gen Accelerator Program entrant
- w/o = Walkover
- r = Retired
- d = Defaulted

First round
Alt	(Spain) S Soler Espinosa (Spain) S Sorribes Tormo	6	3	[10]
(Czech Republic) B Krejčíková (Germany) A Lottner	4	6	[1]
(Ukraine) O Ianchuk (Russia) A Komardina	4	7^{7}	[11]
(Netherlands) C Burger (Czech Republic) K Vaňková	6	6^{5}	[9]
3	(Czech Republic) L Kunčíková (Czech Republic) K Stuchlá	7	6
WC	(Russia) A Pribylova (Turkey) D Yurtkuran	5	4
(Germany) N Geuer (Slovakia) C Škamlová	6	6
(France) A Hesse (Czech Republic) K Kramperová	3	2
(Argentina) T Búa (Austria) S Klemenschits	2	3
(Czech Republic) D Allertová (Poland) K Piter	6	6
(Russia) E Rodina (Germany) C Witthöft	5	4
4	(Sweden) R Peterson (United Kingdom) A Smith	7	6
(Bosnia and Herzegovina) E Burgić Bucko (Spain) G García Pérez	6	6
WC	(Czech Republic) J Malečková (Czech Republic) M Přádová	3	4
WC	(Czech Republic) D Šumová (Czech Republic) V Žovincová	6	2	[5]
2	(Netherlands) D Schuurs (Czech Republic) R Voráčová	3	6	[10]

Quarterfinals
Alt	(Spain) S Soler Espinosa (Spain) S Sorribes Tormo	6	6
(Ukraine) O Ianchuk (Russia) A Komardina	2	3
3	(Czech Republic) L Kunčíková (Czech Republic) K Stuchlá	2	6	[1]
(Germany) N Geuer (Slovakia) C Škamlová	6	2	[10]
(Czech Republic) D Allertová (Poland) K Piter	6	4	[12]
4	(Sweden) R Peterson (United Kingdom) A Smith	4	6	[10]
(Bosnia and Herzegovina) E Burgić Bucko (Spain) G García Pérez	1	2
2	(Netherlands) D Schuurs (Czech Republic) R Voráčová	6	6

Semifinals
Alt	(Spain) S Soler Espinosa (Spain) S Sorribes Tormo	6	6
(Germany) N Geuer (Slovakia) C Škamlová	1	3
(Czech Republic) D Allertová (Poland) K Piter	1	4
2	(Netherlands) D Schuurs (Czech Republic) R Voráčová	6	6

Final
Alt	(Spain) S Soler Espinosa (Spain) S Sorribes Tormo	5	6	[4]
2	(Netherlands) D Schuurs (Czech Republic) R Voráčová	7	3	[10]
