= 2016 Advantage Cars Prague Open – Women's singles =

Women's singles
- 2016 Advantage Cars Prague Open

Final
- Champion: (Germany) Antonia Lottner
- Runner-up: (Germany) Carina Witthöft
- Score: 7–6^{(8–6)}, 1–6, 7–5

Events
Singles	men	women
Doubles	men	women
- Advantage Cars Prague Open

The women's singles of the 2016 Advantage Cars Prague Open tournament was played on clay in Prague, Czech Republic.

María Teresa Torró Flor was the defending champion, but lost in the first round to Denisa Allertová.

Antonia Lottner won the title, defeating Carina Witthöft in the final, 7–6^{(8–6)}, 1–6, 7–5.

== Seeds ==
1. (Germany) Mona Barthel (quarterfinals, retired)
2. (Czech Republic) Denisa Allertová (second round)
3. (Italy) Karin Knapp (second round, retired)
4. (Germany) Carina Witthöft (final)
5. (Ukraine) Kateryna Kozlova (quarterfinals)
6. (Russia) Evgeniya Rodina (quarterfinals)
7. (Russia) Elizaveta Kulichkova (quarterfinals)
8. (Spain) Sílvia Soler Espinosa (second round)

== Main draw ==
Key

- Q = Qualifier
- WC = Wild card
- LL = Lucky loser
- Alt = Alternate
- ITF = ITF entry
- PR = Protected ranking
- SR = Special ranking
- SE = Special exempt
- JE = Junior exempt
- JR = Junior Accelerator Programme entrant
- CO = College Accelerator Programme entrant
- NG = Next Gen Accelerator Program entrant
- w/o = Walkover
- r = Retired
- d = Defaulted

=== Finals ===
Semifinals
Q	(Germany) Antonia Lottner	6	3	6
(Sweden) Rebecca Peterson	3	6	2
4	(Germany) Carina Witthöft	5	6	6
Q	(Slovakia) Rebecca Šramková	7	1	3

Final
Q	(Germany) Antonia Lottner	7^{8}	1	7
4	(Germany) Carina Witthöft	6^{6}	6	5

=== Top half ===
First round
1	(Germany) M Barthel	6	6
Q	(Russia) A Komardina	1	4
(Czech Republic) B Krejčíková	2	6	5
(Austria) B Haas	6	3	7
(Spain) S Sorribes Tormo	4	3
Q	(Germany) A Lottner	6	6
(Belarus) A Sabalenka	7^{7}	1	3
8	(Spain) S Soler Espinosa	6^{5}	6	6
3	(Italy) K Knapp	6	4	6
(Netherlands) C Burger	4	6	1
(Sweden) R Peterson	6	6
(Czech Republic) P Cetkovská	4	2
(Spain) L Domínguez Lino	6^{2}	4
(Russia) P Leykina	7^{7}	6
(Czech Republic) J Malečková	6	3	2
7	(Russia) E Kulichkova	4	6	6

Second round
1	(Germany) M Barthel	6	5	7^{7}
(Austria) B Haas	3	7	6^{4}
Q	(Germany) A Lottner	6	6
8	(Spain) S Soler Espinosa	1	1
3	(Italy) K Knapp	3	0^{r}
(Sweden) R Peterson	6	1
(Russia) P Leykina	2	4
7	(Russia) E Kulichkova	6	6

Quarterfinals
1	(Germany) M Barthel	2	0^{r}
Q	(Germany) A Lottner	6	0
(Sweden) R Peterson	4	6	6
7	(Russia) E Kulichkova	6	4	0

Semifinals
Q	(Germany) A Lottner	6	3	6
(Sweden) R Peterson	3	6	2

=== Bottom half ===
First round
5	(Ukraine) K Kozlova	6	6
WC	(Czech Republic) K Muchová	2	4
Q	(Russia) E Alexandrova	6	6
(Tunisia) O Jabeur	2	1
WC	(Poland) K Piter	2	6	6
WC	(Czech Republic) A Hlaváčková	6	4	1
WC	(Czech Republic) S Heinová	1	1
4	(Germany) C Witthöft	6	6
6	(Russia) E Rodina	6	6
(France) V Razzano	1	3
(Czech Republic) T Martincová	1	5
(France) A Hesse	6	7
LL	(Italy) M Di Giuseppe	7^{7}	3	2
Q	(Slovakia) R Šramková	6^{3}	6	6
(Spain) MT Torró Flor	2	3
2	(Czech Republic) D Allertová	6	6

Second round
5	(Ukraine) K Kozlova	4	7^{7}	6
Q	(Russia) E Alexandrova	6	6^{5}	4
WC	(Poland) K Piter	6	4	4
4	(Germany) C Witthöft	3	6	6
6	(Russia) E Rodina	7	7^{8}
(France) A Hesse	5	6^{6}
Q	(Slovakia) R Šramková	6^{7}	6	6
2	(Czech Republic) D Allertová	7^{9}	1	3

Quarterfinals
5	(Ukraine) K Kozlova	4	4
4	(Germany) C Witthöft	6	6
6	(Russia) E Rodina	0	6^{4}
Q	(Slovakia) R Šramková	6	7^{7}

Semifinals
4	(Germany) C Witthöft	5	6	6
Q	(Slovakia) R Šramková	7	1	3
