= 2014 Portugal Open – Women's singles =

Women's singles
- 2014 Portugal Open

Final
- Champion: (Spain) Carla Suárez Navarro
- Runner-up: (Russia) Svetlana Kuznetsova
- Score: 6–4, 3–6, 6–4

Events
| Singles | men | women |
| Doubles | men | women |
- Portugal Open

Anastasia Pavlyuchenkova was the defending champion, but withdrew before the event started.

Carla Suárez Navarro won the title, defeating Svetlana Kuznetsova in the final, 6–4, 3–6, 6–4.

== Seeds ==
1. (Spain) Carla Suárez Navarro (champion)
2. (Canada) Eugenie Bouchard (quarterfinals)
3. (Australia) Samantha Stosur (first round)
4. (Italy) Roberta Vinci (quarterfinals)

5. (Estonia) Kaia Kanepi (second round)
6. (Czech Republic) Lucie Šafářová (second round)
7. (Russia) Svetlana Kuznetsova (final)
8. (Russia) Elena Vesnina (semifinals)

== Draw ==
Key

- Q = Qualifier
- WC = Wild card
- LL = Lucky loser
- Alt = Alternate
- ITF = ITF entry
- PR = Protected ranking
- SR = Special ranking
- SE = Special exempt
- JE = Junior exempt
- JR = Junior Accelerator Programme entrant
- CO = College Accelerator Programme entrant
- NG = Next Gen Accelerator Program entrant
- w/o = Walkover
- r = Retired
- d = Defaulted

=== Finals ===
Semifinals
1 | (Spain) Carla Suárez Navarro | 7^{7} | 6
Q | (Romania) Irina-Camelia Begu | 6^{3} | 1
8 | (Russia) Elena Vesnina | 3 | 1
7 | (Russia) Svetlana Kuznetsova | 6 | 6

Final
1 | (Spain) Carla Suárez Navarro | 6 | 3 | 6
7 | (Russia) Svetlana Kuznetsova | 4 | 6 | 4

=== Top half ===
First round
1 | (Spain) C Suárez Navarro | 6 | 6
Q | (Russia) A Kudryavtseva | 1 | 2
(Czech Republic) B Záhlavová-Strýcová | 4 | 6 | 6
SE | (Switzerland) R Oprandi | 6 | 1 | 4
(Switzerland) S Vögele | 6 | 2 | 4
(Slovenia) P Hercog | 2 | 6 | 6
(Slovakia) M Rybáriková | 6 | 0 | 0
6 | (Czech Republic) L Šafářová | 4 | 6 | 6
3 | (Australia) S Stosur | 4 | 0
Q | (Switzerland) T Bacsinszky | 6 | 6
WC | (Portugal) MJ Koehler | 3 | 1
WC | (Tunisia) O Jabeur | 6 | 6
(Japan) K Nara | 1 | 6^{5}
Q | (Romania) I-C Begu | 6 | 7^{7}
(Austria) Y Meusburger | 2 | 1
5 | (Estonia) K Kanepi | 6 | 6

Second round
1 | (Spain) C Suárez Navarro | 6 | 6
(Czech Republic) B Záhlavová-Strýcová | 0 | 0
(Slovenia) P Hercog | 6 | 4 | 6
6 | (Czech Republic) L Šafářová | 3 | 6 | 2
Q | (Switzerland) T Bacsinszky | 7 | 6
WC | (Tunisia) O Jabeur | 5 | 0
Q | (Romania) I-C Begu | 6 | 7
5 | (Estonia) K Kanepi | 4 | 5

Quarterfinals
1 | (Spain) C Suárez Navarro | 6 | 6
(Slovenia) P Hercog | 1 | 3
Q | (Switzerland) T Bacsinszky | 3 | 6^{6}
Q | (Romania) I-C Begu | 6 | 7^{8}

Semifinals
1 | (Spain) C Suárez Navarro | 7^{7} | 6
Q | (Romania) I-C Begu | 6^{3} | 1

=== Bottom half ===
First round
8 | (Russia) E Vesnina | 6 | 6
Q | (France) K Mladenovic | 4 | 1
(Serbia) B Jovanovski | 6 | 4 | 6
(Puerto Rico) M Puig | 4 | 6 | 4
(Belgium) Y Wickmayer | 6 | 7
(Poland) U Radwańska | 4 | 5
(Romania) A Cadanțu | 2 | 6 | 1
4 | (Italy) R Vinci | 6 | 4 | 6
7 | (Russia) S Kuznetsova | 6 | 6
(China) S Zhang | 4 | 0
(Spain) MT Torró Flor | 6 | 6
(China) S Peng | 1 | 4
(Kazakhstan) Y Shvedova | 6 | 6
(Italy) K Knapp | 2 | 4
PR | (Russia) A Kleybanova | 4 | 1
2/WC | (Canada) E Bouchard | 6 | 6

Second round
8 | (Russia) E Vesnina | 5 | 7 | 7^{9}
(Serbia) B Jovanovski | 7 | 5 | 6^{7}
(Belgium) Y Wickmayer | 0 | 2
4 | (Italy) R Vinci | 6 | 6
7 | (Russia) S Kuznetsova | 5 | 6 | 6
(Spain) MT Torró Flor | 7 | 4 | 1
(Kazakhstan) Y Shvedova | 4 | 2
2/WC | (Canada) E Bouchard | 6 | 6

Quarterfinals
8 | (Russia) E Vesnina | 7^{7} | 4 | 7
4 | (Italy) R Vinci | 6^{5} | 6 | 5
7 | (Russia) S Kuznetsova | 6 | 6
2/WC | (Canada) E Bouchard | 4 | 1

Semifinals
8 | (Russia) E Vesnina | 3 | 1
7 | (Russia) S Kuznetsova | 6 | 6

== Qualifying ==
=== Seeds ===
1. (Germany) Dinah Pfizenmaier (second round)
2. (Germany) Mona Barthel (second round)
3. (France) Kristina Mladenovic (qualified)
4. (Canada) Sharon Fichman (first round)
5. (Belarus) Olga Govortsova (first round)
6. (Spain) Sílvia Soler Espinosa (qualifying competition)
7. (Spain) Estrella Cabeza Candela (second round)
8. (Romania) Irina-Camelia Begu (qualified)

=== Qualifiers ===
1. (Russia) Alla Kudryavtseva
2. (Romania) Irina-Camelia Begu
3. (France) Kristina Mladenovic
4. (Switzerland) Timea Bacsinszky

=== Draw ===
==== First qualifier ====
First round
1 | (Germany) Dinah Pfizenmaier | 6 | 6
WC | (Portugal) Rita Vilaça | 0 | 3
(Russia) Alla Kudryavtseva | 7^{7} | 6
(Spain) Arantxa Parra Santonja | 6^{4} | 2
(Italy) Gioia Barbieri | 2 | 7 | 6
(Argentina) María Irigoyen | 6 | 5 | 0
(Spain) Anabel Medina Garrigues | 3 | 6 | 6
5 | (Belarus) Olga Govortsova | 6 | 3 | 2

Second round
1 | (Germany) Dinah Pfizenmaier | 6 | 1 | 3
(Russia) Alla Kudryavtseva | 2 | 6 | 6
(Italy) Gioia Barbieri | 2 | 7 | 5
(Spain) Anabel Medina Garrigues | 6 | 5 | 7

Qualifying competition
(Russia) Alla Kudryavtseva | 6 | 3 | 6
(Spain) Anabel Medina Garrigues | 4 | 6 | 0

==== Second qualifier ====
First round
2 | (Germany) Mona Barthel | 6 | 6
(Russia) Valeria Solovyeva | 1 | 1
(Netherlands) Kiki Bertens | 6 | 6
(France) Claire Feuerstein | 2 | 2
(Georgia (country)) Oksana Kalashnikova | 6 | 6
WC | (Portugal) Maria Palhoto | 0 | 2
WC | (Portugal) Claudia Gaspar | 0 | 0
8 | (Romania) Irina-Camelia Begu | 6 | 6

Second round
2 | (Germany) Mona Barthel | 3 | 3
(Netherlands) Kiki Bertens | 6 | 6
(Georgia (country)) Oksana Kalashnikova | 3 | 1
8 | (Romania) Irina-Camelia Begu | 6 | 6

Qualifying competition
(Netherlands) Kiki Bertens | 6 | 4 | 2
8 | (Romania) Irina-Camelia Begu | 0 | 6 | 6

==== Third qualifier ====
First round
3 | (France) Kristina Mladenovic | 6 | 6
(Poland) Alicja Rosolska | 4 | 4
(Canada) Gabriela Dabrowski | 6 | 1 | 3
(Germany) Kristina Barrois | 0 | 6 | 6
WC | (Portugal) Ines Murta | 2 | 0
(Italy) Nastassja Burnett | 6 | 6
(Russia) Valeria Savinykh | 1 | 0
6 | (Spain) Sílvia Soler Espinosa | 6 | 6

Second round
3 | (France) Kristina Mladenovic | 7^{9} | 2 | 6
(Germany) Kristina Barrois | 6^{7} | 6 | 0
(Italy) Nastassja Burnett | 6 | 0 | 2
6 | (Spain) Sílvia Soler Espinosa | 2 | 6 | 6

Qualifying competition
3 | (France) Kristina Mladenovic | 6 | 7
6 | (Spain) Sílvia Soler Espinosa | 2 | 5

==== Fourth qualifier ====
First round
4 | (Canada) Sharon Fichman | 4 | 7 | 6^{8}
(Switzerland) Timea Bacsinszky | 6 | 5 | 7^{10}
WC | (Portugal) Bárbara Luz | 1 | 1
(Colombia) Mariana Duque-Marino | 6 | 6
(France) Alizé Lim | 6 | 6
(Ukraine) Valeriya Strakhova | 3 | 0
(Russia) Ekaterina Lopes | 6 | 3 | 3
7 | (Spain) Estrella Cabeza Candela | 0 | 6 | 6

Second round
(Switzerland) Timea Bacsinszky | 6 | 6
(Colombia) Mariana Duque-Marino | 2 | 2
(France) Alizé Lim | 7 | 6
7 | (Spain) Estrella Cabeza Candela | 5 | 3

Qualifying competition
(Switzerland) Timea Bacsinszky | 6 | 6
(France) Alizé Lim | 2 | 4
