= 2016 Advantage Cars Prague Open – Men's singles =

Men's singles
- 2016 Advantage Cars Prague Open

Final
- Champion: (Colombia) Santiago Giraldo
- Runner-up: (Belarus) Uladzimir Ignatik
- Score: 6–4, 3–6, 7–6^{(7–2)}

Events
Singles	men	women
Doubles	men	women
- Advantage Cars Prague Open

The men's singles of the 2016 Advantage Cars Prague Open tournament was played on clay in Prague, Czech Republic.

Rogério Dutra Silva was the defending champion but chose not to defend his title.

Santiago Giraldo won the title after defeating Uladzimir Ignatik 6–4, 3–6, 7–6^{(7–2)} in the final.

== Seeds ==
1. (Slovakia) Martin Kližan (quarterfinals)
2. (Moldova) Radu Albot (semifinals)
3. (Georgia (country)) Nikoloz Basilashvili (quarterfinals)
4. (Slovakia) Jozef Kovalík (second round)
5. (Spain) Daniel Gimeno-Traver (second round)
6. (Colombia) Santiago Giraldo (champion)
7. (Switzerland) Henri Laaksonen (quarterfinals)
8. (Argentina) Facundo Argüello (first round)

== Draw ==
Key

- Q = Qualifier
- WC = Wild card
- LL = Lucky loser
- Alt = Alternate
- ITF = ITF entry
- PR = Protected ranking
- SR = Special ranking
- SE = Special exempt
- JE = Junior exempt
- JR = Junior Accelerator Programme entrant
- CO = College Accelerator Programme entrant
- NG = Next Gen Accelerator Program entrant
- w/o = Walkover
- r = Retired
- d = Defaulted

=== Finals ===
Semifinals
6	(Colombia) Santiago Giraldo	6	6
(Czech Republic) Zdeněk Kolář	4	4
(Belarus) Uladzimir Ignatik	6	6
2	(Moldova) Radu Albot	1	2

Final
6	(Colombia) Santiago Giraldo	6	3	7^{7}
(Belarus) Uladzimir Ignatik	4	6	6^{2}

=== Top half ===
First round
1/WC	(Slovakia) M Kližan	6	6
(Turkey) M İlhan	3	4
Q	(Ukraine) Vadym Ursu	7^{7}	3	4
(Kazakhstan) A Nedovyesov	6^{4}	6	6
Q	(Poland) H Hurkacz	4	6	6
(Czech Republic) J Šátral	6	3	2
(Czech Republic) J Mertl	5	6^{2}
6	(Colombia) S Giraldo	7	7^{7}
3	(Georgia (country)) N Basilashvili	7^{7}	7
(Spain) J Samper-Montaña	6^{3}	5
(Brazil) A Ghem	4	6	6
(France) A Michon	6	1	2
(Russia) I Nedelko	6^{6}	2
(Czech Republic) Z Kolář	7^{8}	6
WC	(Czech Republic) Lukáš Vejvara	4	1
5	(Spain) D Gimeno-Traver	6	6

Second round
1/WC	(Slovakia) M Kližan	6	6
(Kazakhstan) A Nedovyesov	4	2
Q	(Poland) H Hurkacz	3	1
6	(Colombia) S Giraldo	6	6
3	(Georgia (country)) N Basilashvili	6	6
(Brazil) A Ghem	3	4
(Czech Republic) Z Kolář	6	6
5	(Spain) D Gimeno-Traver	0	3

Quarterfinals
1/WC	(Slovakia) M Kližan	1	5
6	(Colombia) S Giraldo	6	7
3	(Georgia (country)) N Basilashvili	3	6	6^{7}
(Czech Republic) Z Kolář	6	2	7^{9}

Semifinals
6	(Colombia) S Giraldo	6	6
(Czech Republic) Z Kolář	4	4

=== Bottom half ===
First round
8	(Argentina) F Argüello	2	6^{3}
(Italy) L Giustino	6	7^{7}
(Belarus) U Ignatik	6	6
Q	(Slovakia) I Zelenay	3	2
(Slovenia) B Rola	6	6
(Austria) D Novak	4	3
(Portugal) FF Silva	4	6^{4}
4	(Slovakia) J Kovalík	6	7^{7}
7	(Switzerland) H Laaksonen	6	6
(Czech Republic) M Michalička	4	2
(Slovakia) N Gombos	4	3
(Czech Republic) J Hernych	6	6
WC	(Czech Republic) David Šimůnek	3	3
WC	(Czech Republic) V Šafránek	6	6
Q	(Czech Republic) M Vocel	4	3
2	(Moldova) R Albot	6	6

Second round
(Italy) L Giustino	7^{7}	3	6^{3}
(Belarus) U Ignatik	6^{4}	6	7^{7}
(Slovenia) B Rola	4	6	6
4	(Slovakia) J Kovalík	6	3	4
7	(Switzerland) H Laaksonen	6	6
(Czech Republic) J Hernych	4	2
WC	(Czech Republic) V Šafránek	4	6^{5}
2	(Moldova) R Albot	6	7^{7}

Quarterfinals
(Belarus) U Ignatik	6	7^{7}
(Slovenia) B Rola	4	6^{3}
7	(Switzerland) H Laaksonen	3	2
2	(Moldova) R Albot	6	6

Semifinals
(Belarus) U Ignatik	6	6
2	(Moldova) R Albot	1	2
