= Felipe Ríos =

Chilean tennis player

- Country (sports): Chile
- Born: 4 March 1992 (age 33); Viña del Mar, Chile
- Plays: Right-handed (two-handed backhand)
- Prize money: $14,571

Singles
- Career record: 0–1
- Career titles: 0 ITF
- Highest ranking: No. 738 (6 May 2013)

Doubles
- Career record: 0–0
- Career titles: 1 ITF
- Highest ranking: No. 733 (29 April 2013)
- Last updated on: 20 February 2017.

Felipe Ríos (born 4 March 1992) is a Chilean tennis player.

Ríos has a career high ATP singles ranking of 738 achieved on 6 May 2013. He also has a career high ATP doubles ranking of 733 achieved on 29 April 2013.

Ríos made his ATP main draw debut at the 2011 Movistar Open, by receiving a wildcard in the singles draw facing Rui Machado.
