= 2011 Movistar Open =

- Date: January 30 – February 6
- Edition: 18th
- Category: World Tour 250
- Draw: 32S / 16D
- Prize money: USD398,250
- Surface: Clay / outdoor
- Location: Santiago, Chile
- Venue: Estadio San Carlos de Apoquindo

Champions

Singles
- (Spain) Tommy Robredo

Doubles
- (Brazil) Marcelo Melo / (Brazil) Bruno Soares
- Chile Open

The 2011 Movistar Open was a men's tennis tournament played on clay courts. It was the 16th edition of the Movistar Open, and was part of the ATP World Tour 250 series of the 2011 ATP World Tour. It took place at the Estadio San Carlos de Apoquindo in Santiago, Chile from January 30 through February 6, 2011.

== ATP entrants ==
=== Seeds ===
Country	Player	Rank^{1}	Seed
ARG	David Nalbandian	21	1
ARG	Juan Mónaco	28	2
BRA	Thomaz Bellucci	30	3
ARG	Juan Ignacio Chela	39	4
ITA	Potito Starace	48	5
ESP	Tommy Robredo	52	6
ITA	Fabio Fognini	58	7
COL	Santiago Giraldo	59	8

- Rankings are as of January 17, 2011

=== Other entrants ===
The following players received wildcards into the singles main draw:

- (Chile) Paul Capdeville
- (Chile) Nicolás Massú
- (Chile) Felipe Rios

The following players received entry from the qualifying draw:

- (Chile) Jorge Aguilar
- (Argentina) Facundo Bagnis
- (Brazil) Ricardo Hocevar
- (Brazil) Caio Zampieri

== Finals ==
=== Singles ===
(Spain) Tommy Robredo defeated (Colombia) Santiago Giraldo, 6–2, 2–6, 7–6^{(7–5)}

- It was Robredo's 1st title of the year and 10th of his career.

=== Doubles ===
(Brazil) Marcelo Melo / (Brazil) Bruno Soares defeated (Poland) Łukasz Kubot / (Austria) Oliver Marach, 6–3, 7–6^{(7–3)}
