= Carlos Berlocq =

Argentine tennis player

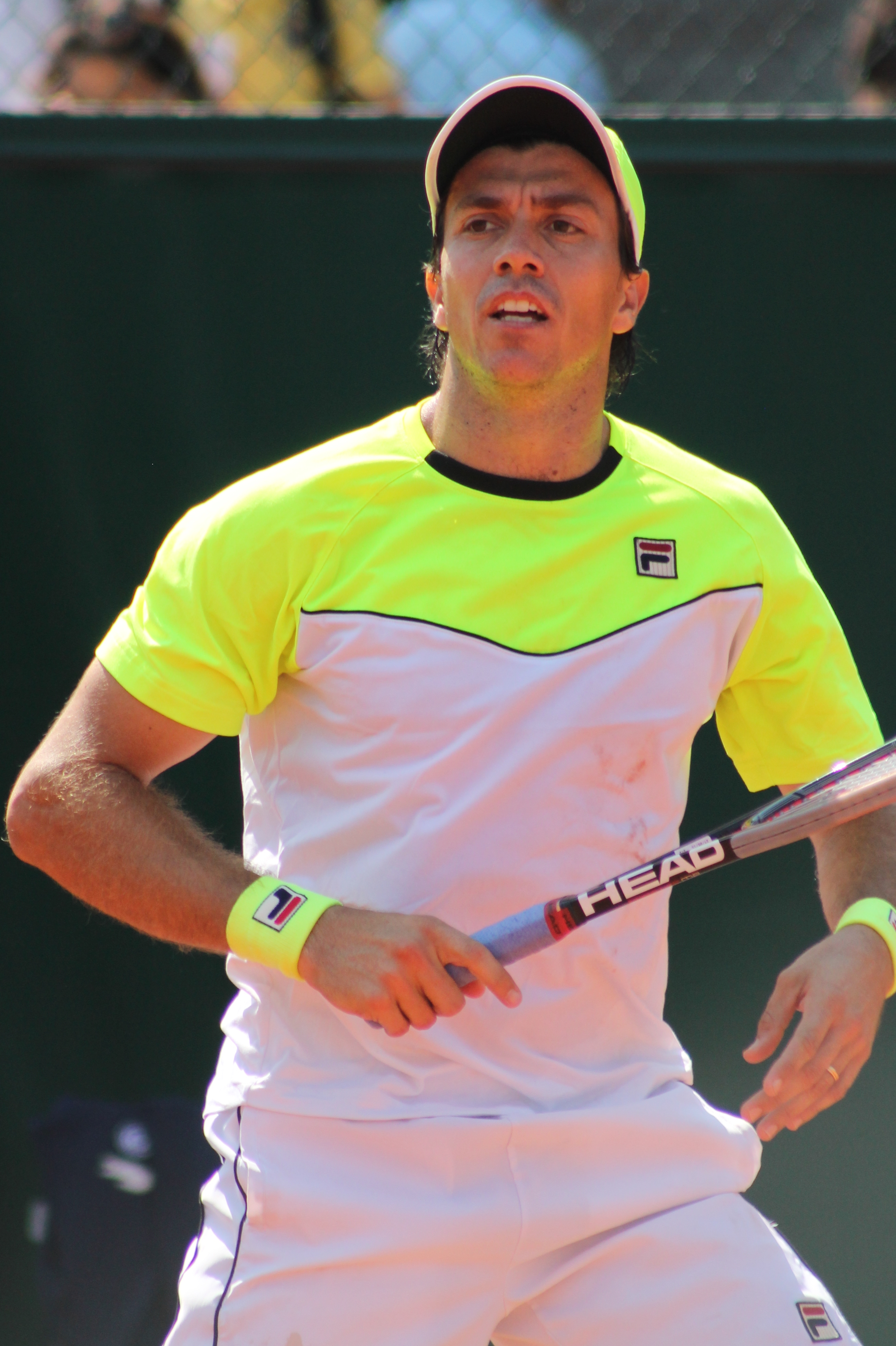
- Berlocq at the 2015 French Open
- Country (sports): Argentina
- Residence: Buenos Aires, Argentina
- Born: February 3, 1983 (age 42) Chascomús, Argentina
- Height: 1.83 m (6 ft 0 in)
- Turned pro: 2001
- Retired: December 2019
- Plays: Right-handed (one-handed backhand)
- Prize money: $4,253,764

Singles
- Career record: 134–193
- Career titles: 2
- Highest ranking: No. 37 (March 19, 2012)

Grand Slam singles results
- Australian Open: 2R (2012, 2013, 2017)
- French Open: 2R (2007, 2011, 2014, 2015, 2016)
- Wimbledon: 1R (2006, 2007, 2008, 2011, 2012, 2013, 2014, 2017)
- US Open: 2R (2011, 2013)

Other tournaments
- Olympic Games: 1R (2012)

Doubles
- Career record: 83–120
- Career titles: 2
- Highest ranking: No. 50 (June 6, 2011)

Grand Slam doubles results
- Australian Open: 2R (2011, 2012)
- French Open: 3R (2007)
- Wimbledon: 2R (2008)
- US Open: QF (2014)

Team competitions
- Davis Cup: W (2016)

Carlos Alberto Berlocq (Spanish pronunciation: [kaɾlos alˈβeɾto βeɾˈlok]; (Note: In isolation, Berlocq is pronounced [beɾˈlok].) born February 3, 1983) is an Argentine former professional tennis player and coach nicknamed Charly, Panther and Warlocq. Berlocq's career-high singles ranking was World No. 37, achieved in March 2012. His favourite surface was clay.

== Career ==
Berlocq started playing tennis at the age of four and had success on the ATP Futures and Challenger circuits. In 2004, he made six consecutive finals on the Futures circuit and won half of them, two each in Argentina, France and Slovenia. He also made his first Challenger final in Manta, Ecuador, losing to Giovanni Lapentti before winning another Futures title in Argentina.

At the end of 2005, Berlocq finished inside the top 100 for the first time on the back of strong form on the Challenger Tour, where he went 44–20 in singles and won two titles in Turin (defeating Alessio di Mauro) and in Cordenons (defeating Jérôme Haehnel). Berlocq also qualified for his first ATP main event in Stuttgart, losing to Răzvan Sabău. He also played doubles in Bucharest with Mariano Puerta.

Berlocq struggled to adapt his level from the Futures and Challengers to the ATP main level events and achieved only limited success on the ATP Tour. However, his first win was significant. At the ATP Masters Series event in Miami, Berlocq defeated the much-hyped American junior and wildcard entrant Donald Young 6–0, 6–0. Neither player had won a match on the ATP Tour and this win was achieved on a hardcourt, not Berlocq's favoured surface. After defeating Young, Berlocq played another American, James Blake, losing this match 0–6, 0–6 and therefore creating an unusual achievement of winning his first ATP-level match 6–0, 6–0 and then losing by the same scoreline in the next round.

Berlocq won two consecutive matches for the first time on the ATP Tour to make the quarterfinals in Sopot after defeating Philipp Kohlschreiber and Lukáš Dlouhý.

On May 29, 2007, Berlocq upset the No. 30 seed Julien Benneteau in four sets 6–7^{(5–7)}, 7–5, 6–2, 6–3 at the 2007 French Open. Berlocq won his first ever grass court match in 's-Hertogenbosch against former World No. 1 Juan Carlos Ferrero in three sets.

=== 2011 ===
At the French Open, he defeated Australian Bernard Tomic 7–5, 6–4, 6–2 in the first round.

Berlocq was taken out by World No. 1 Novak Djokovic in three sets 6–0, 6–0, 6–2 in the second round of the 2011 US Open.

=== 2012 ===
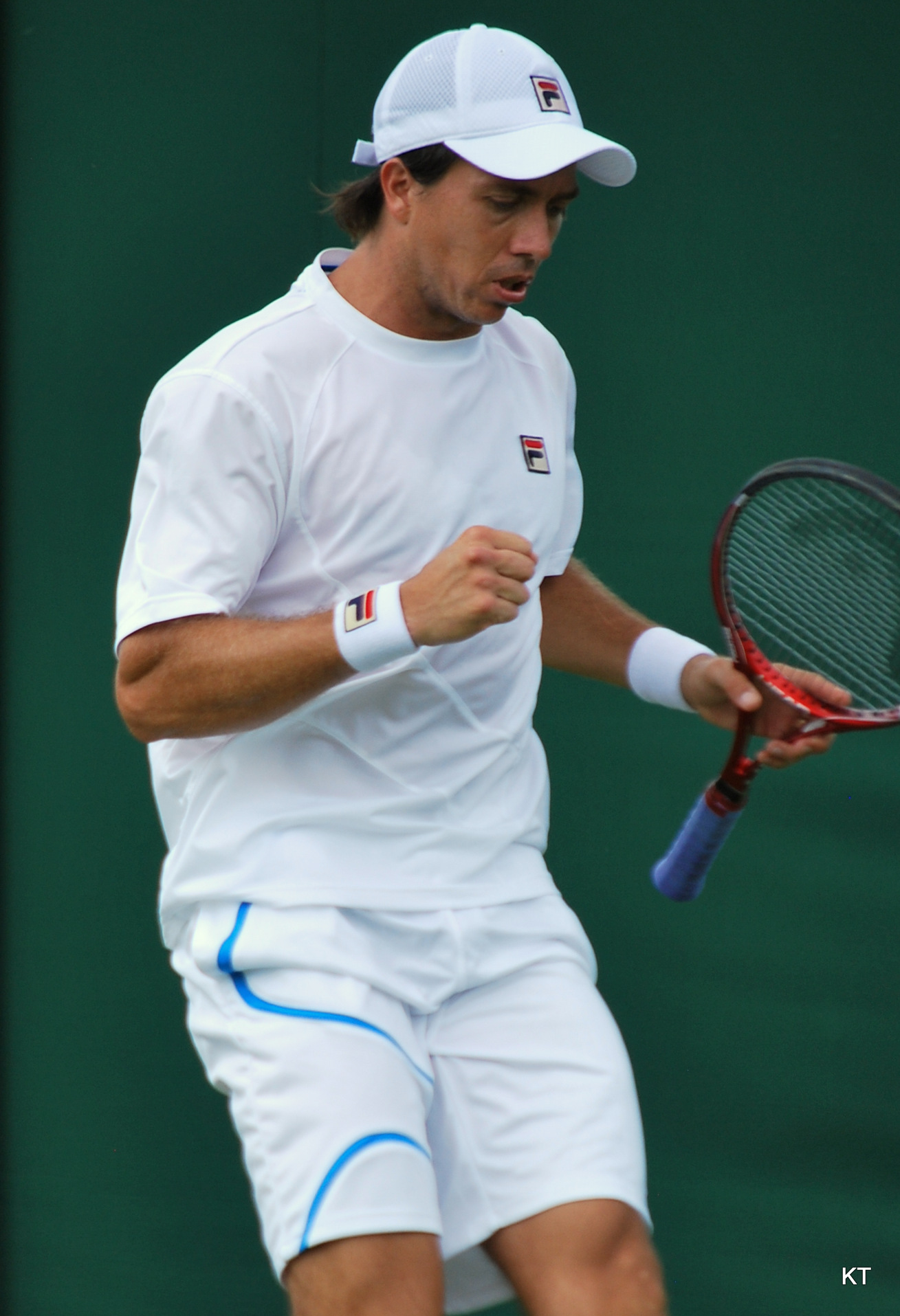
Berlocq at the 2012 Wimbledon Championships

Berlocq started the year in Auckland, losing in the second round to Fernando Verdasco. He made it to the second round of the 2012 Australian Open, where he was defeated by Ivo Karlović.

His best result of the year was in Viña del Mar, where he defeated World No. 25 Juan Ignacio Chela in the semifinals to set up a final appearance against Juan Mónaco, which he lost. He made the quarterfinals in São Paulo, Buenos Aires and Acapulco, losing to World No. 11 Nicolás Almagro, David Nalbandian and Santiago Giraldo respectively. He also made the quarterfinals in Houston, exiting against World No. 15 Feliciano López. He did not have much success at the Masters 1000 events or Grand Slams, exiting in the first or second round of each. In Umag, he fell to World No. 19 Alexandr Dolgopolov in the quarterfinals.

He represented Argentina at the 2012 Summer Olympics, but lost in the first round to Alex Bogomolov of Russia.

At the US Open, he was defeated in the first round by Bernard Tomic in four sets.

=== 2013 ===
He beat Maxime Authom 1–6, 7–6^{(7–5)}, 7–6^{(7–4)}, 6–2 in the first round of the Australian Open before losing to Kei Nishikori 6–7^{(4–7)}, 4–6, 1–6. He lost his first round match at the French Open against 19th seed John Isner in straight sets. Berlocq won his first career title at the Swedish Open, defeating Fernando Verdasco in the final. He lost in the second round of the US Open in straight sets to Roger Federer after winning his first round match against Santiago Giraldo in five sets.

=== 2014 ===
In April, Berlocq won the Portugal Open after defeating Tomáš Berdych in the final.

== ATP career finals ==
=== Singles: 3 (2 titles, 1 runner-up) ===
Legend Grand Slam tournaments (0–0) ATP World Tour Finals (0–0) ATP World Tour Masters 1000 (0–0) ATP World Tour 500 Series (0–0) ATP World Tour 250 Series (2–1)	Titles by surface Hard (0–0) Clay (2–1) Grass (0–0)	Titles by setting Outdoor (2–1) Indoor (0–0)

Result	W–L	Date	Tournament	Tier	Surface	Opponent	Score
Loss	0–1	Feb 2012	Chile Open, Chile	250 Series	Clay	(Argentina) Juan Mónaco	3–6, 7–6^{(7–1)}, 1–6
Win	1–1	Jul 2013	Swedish Open, Sweden	250 Series	Clay	(Spain) Fernando Verdasco	7–5, 6–1
Win	2–1	May 2014	Portugal Open, Portugal	250 Series	Clay	(Czech Republic) Tomáš Berdych	0–6, 7–5, 6–1

=== Doubles: 7 (2 titles, 5 runner-ups) ===
Legend Grand Slam tournaments (0–0) ATP World Tour Finals (0–0) ATP World Tour Masters 1000 (0–0) ATP World Tour 500 Series (0–1) ATP World Tour 250 Series (2–4)	Titles by surface Hard (0–2) Clay (2–3) Grass (0–0)	Titles by setting Outdoor (2–4) Indoor (0–1)

Result	W–L	Date	Tournament	Tier	Surface	Partner	Opponents	Score
Loss	0–1	Jul 2008	Croatia Open, Croatia	International	Clay	(Italy) Fabio Fognini	(Slovakia) Michal Mertiňák (Czech Republic) Petr Pála	6–2, 3–6, [5–10]
Win	1–1	Jul 2010	Stuttgart Open, Germany	250 Series	Clay	(Argentina) Eduardo Schwank	(Germany) Christopher Kas (Germany) Philipp Petzschner	7–6^{(7–5)}, 7–6^{(8–6)}
Loss	1–2	Oct 2011	Kremlin Cup, Russia	250 Series	Hard (i)	(Spain) David Marrero	(Czech Republic) František Čermák (Slovakia) Filip Polášek	3–6, 1–6
Loss	1–3	Feb 2012	Chile Open, Chile	250 Series	Clay	(Spain) Pablo Andújar	(Portugal) Fred Gil (Spain) Daniel Gimeno Traver	6–1, 5–7, [10–12]
Loss	1–4	Oct 2012	China Open, China	500 Series	Hard	(Uzbekistan) Denis Istomin	(United States) Bob Bryan (United States) Mike Bryan	3–6, 2–6
Loss	1–5	Jul 2013	Swedish Open, Sweden	250 Series	Clay	(Spain) Albert Ramos Viñolas	(United States) Nicholas Monroe (Germany) Simon Stadler	2–6, 6–3, [3–10]
Win	2–5	Aug 2015	Austrian Open, Austria	250 Series	Clay	(Spain) Nicolás Almagro	(Netherlands) Robin Haase (Finland) Henri Kontinen	5–7, 6–3, [11–9]

== Challenger finals ==
=== Titles ===
No.	Date	Tournament	Surface	Opponent	Score
1.	2005	Turin	Clay	(Italy) Alessio di Mauro	7–5, 6–1
2.	2005	Cordenons	Clay	(France) Jérôme Haehnel	7–6, 6–4
3.	2005	Buenos Aires	Clay	(Argentina) Diego Hartfield	7–5, 3–6, 6–4
4.	2006	Naples	Clay	(Uruguay) Pablo Cuevas	6–3, 7–5
5.	2007	Barletta	Clay	(Austria) Werner Eschauer	3–6, 7–6, 2–0 ret.
6.	2007	Turin	Clay	(Serbia) Boris Pašanski	6–4, 6–2
7.	2010	Reggio Emilia	Clay	(Spain) Pablo Andújar	6–0, 7–6^{(7–1)}
8.	2010	San Benedetto	Clay	(Spain) Daniel Gimeno-Traver	6–3, 4–6, 6–4
9.	2010	Todi	Clay	(Spain) Marcel Granollers	6–4, 6–3
10.	2011	Turin	Clay	(Spain) Albert Ramos	6–4, 6–3
11.	2011	Todi	Clay	(Italy) Filippo Volandri	6–3, 6–1
12.	2011	Palermo	Clay	(Romania) Adrian Ungur	6–1, 6–1
13.	2011	Buenos Aires	Clay	(Portugal) Gastão Elias	6–1, 7–6^{(7–3)}
14.	2011	Montevideo	Clay	(Argentina) Máximo González	6–2, 7–5
15.	2014	Porto Alegre	Clay	(Argentina) Diego Schwartzman	6–4, 4–6, 6–0
16.	2015	São Paulo	Clay	(Belgium) Kimmer Coppejans	6–3, 6–1
17.	2016	Blois	Clay	(Belgium) Steve Darcis	6–2, 6–0
18.	2017	Rio de Janeiro	Clay	(Spain) Jaume Munar	6–4, 2–6, 3–0 ret.
19.	2018	Panamá	Clay	(Slovenia) Blaž Rola	6–2, 6–0

=== Doubles: 13 (6–7) ===
Outcome	No.	Date	Tournament	Surface	Partner	Opponents	Score
Runners-up	12.	11 September 2010	Rijeka, Croatia	Clay	(Spain) Rubén Ramírez Hidalgo	(Canada) Adil Shamasdin (Croatia) Lovro Zovko	6–1, 6–7^{(9–11)}, [5–10]
Winner	13.	13 November 2011	Buenos Aires, Argentina	Clay	(Argentina) Eduardo Schwank	(Uruguay) Marcel Felder (Czech Republic) Jaroslav Pospíšil	6–7^{(1–7)}, 6–4, [10–7]

== Performance timelines ==
Key
W	F	SF	QF	#R	RR	Q#	DNQ	A	NH

(W) winner; (F) finalist; (SF) semifinalist; (QF) quarterfinalist; (#R) rounds 4, 3, 2, 1; (RR) round-robin stage; (Q#) qualification round; (DNQ) did not qualify; (A) absent; (NH) not held; (SR) strike rate (events won / competed); (W–L) win–loss record.

=== Singles ===
Tournament	2006	2007	2008	2009	2010	2011	2012	2013	2014	2015	2016	2017	2018	W–L
Grand Slam tournaments
Australian Open	1R	A	1R	A	A	1R	2R	2R	1R	1R	A	2R	A	3–8
French Open	1R	2R	1R	A	Q3	2R	1R	1R	2R	2R	2R	1R	Q2	5–10
Wimbledon	1R	1R	1R	A	A	1R	1R	1R	1R	A	A	1R	A	0–8
US Open	A	1R	A	A	1R	2R	1R	2R	1R	A	1R	1R	1R	2–9
Win–loss	0–3	1–3	0–3	0–0	0–1	2–4	1–4	2–4	1–4	1–2	1–2	1–4	0–1	10–35
Career statistics
Titles–Finals	0–0	0–0	0–0	0–0	0–0	0–0	0–1	1–1	1–1	0–0	0–0	0–0	0–0	2–3
Year-end ranking	132	85	157	255	66	60	66	41	72	111	95	112		

=== Doubles ===
Tournament	2006	2007	2008	2011	2012	2013	2014	2015	2016	2017	2018	W–L
Grand Slam tournaments
Australian Open	1R	A	1R	2R	2R	1R	1R	2R	A	A	A	3–7
French Open	A	3R	1R	2R	2R	1R	1R	3R	A	1R	A	6–8
Wimbledon	A	A	2R	1R	1R	A	1R	A	A	1R	A	1–5
US Open	A	A	A	1R	2R	1R	QF	A	1R	1R	A	4–6
Win–loss	0–1	2–1	1–3	2–4	3–4	0–3	3–4	3–2	0–1	0–3	0–0	14–25

== Wins over top 10 players ==
Seasons	2014	2015	2016	2017	Total
Wins	3	0	0	0	3

#	Player	Rank	Event	Surface	Rd	Score
2014
1.	(Canada) Milos Raonic	No. 9	Estoril Open, Estoril, Portugal	Clay	QF	7–5, 6–4
2.	(Czech Republic) Tomas Berdych	No. 6	Estoril Open, Estoril, Portugal	Clay	F	0–6, 7–5, 6–1
3.	(Spain) David Ferrer	No. 7	Swedish Open, Bastad, Sweden	Clay	QF	6–3, 6–3
