= Santiago Giraldo =

Colombian tennis player

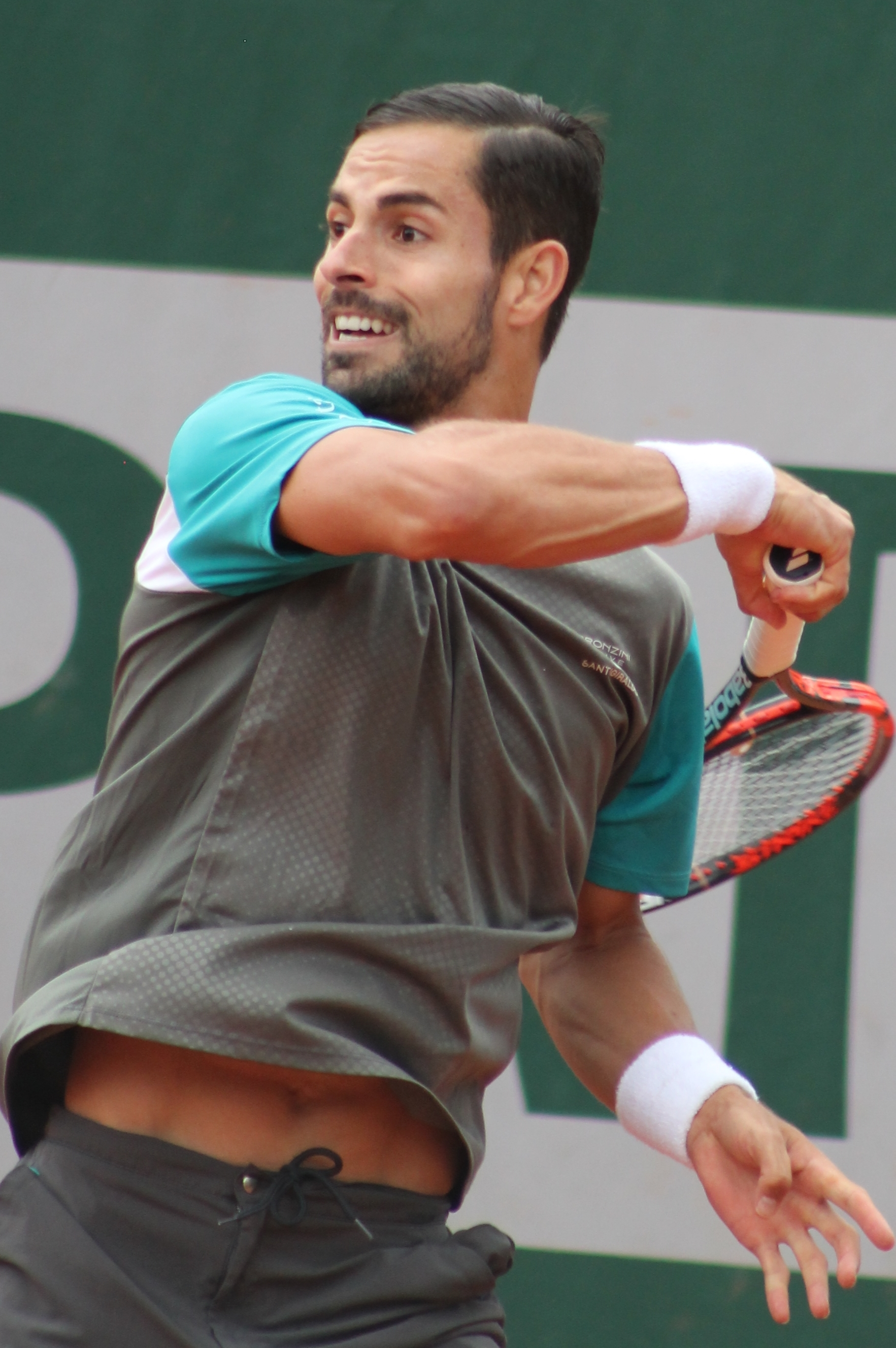
- Giraldo at the 2015 French Open
- Country (sports): Colombia
- Residence: Pereira, Colombia
- Born: 27 November 1987 (age 38) Pereira, Colombia
- Height: 1.88 m (6 ft 2 in)
- Turned pro: 2006
- Retired: 2020
- Plays: Right-handed (two-handed backhand)
- Coach: David Sánchez; Felipe Berón; Pepe Imaz
- Prize money: $4,541,251
- Official website: Official website

Singles
- Career record: 168–205 (ATP Tour and Grand Slam level, and in Davis Cup)
- Career titles: 0
- Highest ranking: No. 28 (29 September 2014)

Grand Slam singles results
- Australian Open: 2R (2010, 2011, 2012, 2015, 2016)
- French Open: 3R (2012)
- Wimbledon: 3R (2014, 2015)
- US Open: 2R (2017)

Doubles
- Career record: 27–74 (ATP Tour and Grand Slam level, and in Davis Cup)
- Career titles: 0
- Highest ranking: No. 77 (8 June 2015)

Grand Slam doubles results
- Australian Open: 2R (2015)
- French Open: 2R (2015)
- Wimbledon: 1R (2010, 2011, 2013, 2014, 2015)
- US Open: 2R (2014, 2015)

Santiago Giraldo Salazar (Latin American Spanish: [sanˈtjaɣo xiˈɾaldo salaˈsaɾ], born 27 November 1987) is a Colombian former professional tennis player. He is the highest-ranked Columbian tennis singles player in ATP rankings history, with a career-high in singles of world No. 28. His best result is reaching the final of the 2014 Barcelona Open Banc Sabadell. He also reached a career-high ranking of No. 77 in doubles. He represented Colombia in the Davis Cup competition.

== Career ==
Throughout his career he has beaten several ex-number-one players such as Lleyton Hewitt, Juan Carlos Ferrero, and Andy Murray as well as some top-ten players such as Jo-Wilfried Tsonga, Kei Nishikori, Marin Čilić, Milos Raonic, Dominic Thiem, Gilles Simon, Jürgen Melzer, Rainer Schüttler, Tommy Robredo, Janko Tipsarević, and Nicolás Lapentti. He has beaten golden-generation players from Argentina such as Gastón Gaudio, Guillermo Cañas, Mariano Puerta, Juan Martín del Potro, and David Nalbandian.

=== 2003-2009: ATP, Major and Masters debuts ===
In October 2003, at age 15, Giraldo became the youngest player in his country to be ranked by the ATP, getting his first point with the ITF Futures tournament in Medellín. In 2005, he won his first professional tournament in Medellín, and a 15,000 dollar prize, in the ITF Futures category. In 2006, age 18, he won the Challenger de Bogotá title and reached the Challenger de Medellín final.

In March 2007, Giraldo won the Challenger de Bogotá title, beating the Brazilian Flávio Saretta, and won the Challenger de Quite against Giovanni Lapentti. He reached two finals in the same Challenger category. Although he lost to the Spanish Fernando Vicente in the Challenger de San Luis Potosí, he was close to the Top-100, reaching world No. 115, and also entered the Roland Garros' main draw as a "lucky loser". In October of the same year, he reached the Challenger de Bogotá final, losing to Marcos Daniel. His only ATP triumph in 2007 was beating the Venezuelan Yohny Romero in the Davis Cup, helping Colombia win the series, 3–1, against Venezuela. During 2008, Giraldo had a 19–17 record in Challenger tournaments, he made it to the Challenger final in Fürth, Germany, and to the Cali Challenger semifinals. He qualified for his first Masters 1000 main draws in Indian Wells, where he recorded his first 1000-level win, and in Miami. For the second consecutive year, he made Roland Garros' main draw, losing in the first round to Florent Serra.

Giraldo opened 2009 by winning the Challenger de Salinas title, defeating Michael Rusell in the final, and, in March, had his sole triumph at the ATP level in the Davis Cup match versus Uruguay. Giraldo then qualified for the Masters 1000's main draw in Indian Wells but lost in the first round to Nicolás Lapentti. One month later, Giraldo won the Challenger de San Luis Potosí's title against the Italian Paolo Lorenzi. For the third consecutive year, Giraldo entered the Roland Garros' main draw, losing to Denis Istomin in five sets in the first round. In the final stretch of the season, Giraldo won 19 out of 26 matches, reaching the Open Cali and Quito semifinals and winning the Sacramento title (defeating Canadian Jesse Levine in the finals) but losing again to Nicolás Lapentti in Guayaquil's final. He finished his best year thus far with three Challenger titles and a 38–14 record.

=== 2010-2016: ATP finals ===
At the 2010 Australian Open, Giraldo defeated seed No. 16 Tommy Robredo (6–4, 6–2, 6–2) in the first round. However, he lost in the second round to Łukasz Kubot (4–6, 6–3, 3–6, 1–6). At the 2010 Internazionali BNL d'Italia in Rome, a Masters 1000 event, he produced a heavy ground game to crush 12th seed Juan Carlos Ferrero (6–0, 6–3) in the first round, followed by a 6–3, 6–2 win over Michaël Llodra in the second round. However his run was ended at the hands of World No. 10 and 7th seed Jo-Wilfried Tsonga (3–6, 4–6) in the third round.

At the 2011 Heineken Open in Auckland, New Zealand, Giraldo made it to the semifinals. At the 2011 Australian Open, he reached the second round where he lost to Marin Čilić (3–6, 6–7, 1–6). He reached his first ATP final at the 2011 Movistar Open in Santiago, Chile, where he lost to Tommy Robredo (2–6, 6–2, 6–7) despite serving for the championship at 5–2. At the 2011 US Open, Giraldo drew World No. 3 Roger Federer in the first round, to whom he lost in straight sets.

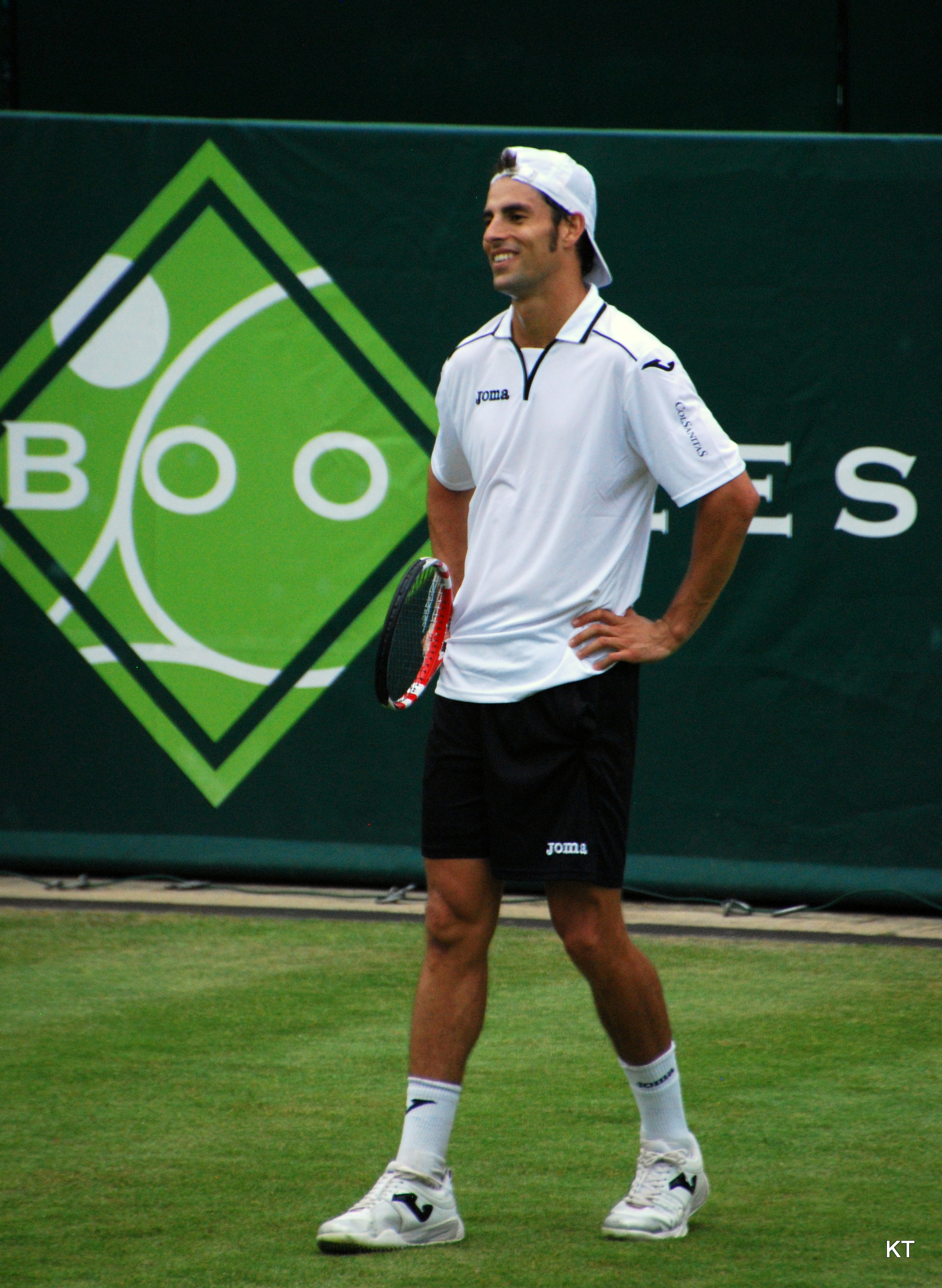
Santiago Giraldo 2013

At the 2012 French Open Giraldo reached the third round for the first time at a Grand Slam event. The following year at the 2013 French Open he lost in the first round to Grega Žemlja in straight sets.

At the 2014 Heineken Open, Giraldo defeated Spaniard Albert Montañés in straight sets but his event participation ended in the second round, losing in a 3-setter against Guillermo García López. He defeated Marcel Granollers and Guillermo García López at the 2014 Royal Guard Open in Viña Del Mar, Chile to reach the semifinals, where he was defeated by Leonardo Mayer. He upset Tommy Robredo at the 2014 U.S. Men's Clay Court Championships and reached the semifinals, where he lost to Fernando Verdasco.

At the 2014 Barcelona Open Banc Sabadell, he reached his second ATP final, and the first one in an ATP World Tour 500 series tournament. On the way, he defeated 3rd-seeded Fabio Fognini, 10th-seeded Philipp Kohlschreiber and 6th-seeded Nicolás Almagro. He lost the tournament against Kei Nishikori in straight sets. In May, in the second round of the 2014 Mutua Madrid Open Giraldo beat 11th-seeded Frenchman Jo-Wilfried Tsonga in straight sets. Then he achieved his first win against a top-10 player, defeating the World No. 8 and two-time Grand Slam champion Andy Murray in straight sets to advance to the quarterfinals, but lost to Roberto Bautista Agut.

At 2014 Wimbledon, Giraldo defeated Marcel Granollers in the second round and lost to Roger Federer in the third round. At the Citi Open in Washington D.C. he was defeated by Vasek Pospisil in the quarterfinals. At the US Open he was beaten by Teymuraz Gabashvili in the first round. He reached the semifinals at Shenzhen, where he lost to Tommy Robredo. At the 2015 Wimbledon Championships he reached the third round for the second time at the event.

In 2016, Giraldo lost to 32nd-seed João Sousa in the second round of the 2016 Australian Open. Giraldo lost in the first round of the 2016 French Open. Giraldo lost in the first round of 2016 Wimbledon Championships to Gilles Müller, in a match that went to 5 sets, Muller eventually prevailing, 15–13, in the last set.

On the ATP Challenger Tour, Giraldo won the 2016 Advantage Cars Prague Open, which included an impressive win in the quarterfinals against world No. 26 Martin Kližan. Giraldo entered the new 2016 Los Cabos Open and defeated Amir Weintraub in straight sets, then faced 4th seed Sam Querrey, whom he defeated in straight sets. He lost to wildcard Pablo Carreño Busta in the quarterfinals.

=== 2020: Retirement ===
Giraldo retired on 6 October 2020.

== Playing style ==
Giraldo has a powerful forehand stroke—with a big backswing and a forward swing that contacts the ball with extreme speed, flattening it out—that he uses to move his opponents around and end points quickly. His forehand has been likened to that of Fernando González, his coach. Giraldo also uses this technique to hit balls out wide at an acute angle, which is a signature shot of his. His forehand is known to reach speeds of up to 110 miles per hour (180 km/h). While his backhand is generally his weaker shot in terms of pace, he uses an identical technique, which makes his backhand flat and low. He is known for his flair in shot-making with both his forehand and backhand, often hitting balls with extreme pace or angles. His best shot is the running forehand.

Giraldo has a powerful return of serve. Unlike traditional good returners such as Andy Murray, Novak Djokovic, and Andre Agassi, who use anticipation and footwork to take serves early and efficiently, Giraldo stands further behind the baseline—especially on second serves—winds up a huge backswing, and takes the ball later, injecting a sudden increase in pace. He is also adept at controlling serves, such that he can hit them at acute angles with speed to finish off the point early. Giraldo's serve is not one of his strengths, but he possesses a decent flat and strong first serve and a top-spin second serve. His first serve can reach up to 120 miles per hour (190 km/h).

Giraldo's weaknesses include inconsistency and lack of agility. Because of his shot-making and hyper-aggressive style of play, he is more than prone to making unforced errors on his groundstroke rallies, more often than on his returns of serve. Because he often goes for hard, flat shots, he hits the ball into the net more often than other players. His playing style relies on dictating points and winning quickly, so he is affected by quick counter-punchers who can move him around and return his shots consistently, such as David Ferrer, Andy Murray, Novak Djokovic, and Rafael Nadal. Giraldo occasionally exhibits clumsy footwork as well, and sometimes is simply not fast enough to retrieve directed or drop shots.

== Personal life ==
In 2014, Giraldo had a relationship with Romanian tennis player Sorana Cîrstea, which ended in the summer of 2017.

== ATP career finals ==
=== Singles: 2 (2 runner-ups) ===
Legend Grand Slam Tournaments (0–0) ATP World Tour Finals(0–0) ATP World Tour Masters 1000 (0–0) ATP World Tour 500 Series (0–1) ATP World Tour 250 Series (0–1)	Titles by surface Hard (0–0) Clay (0–2) Grass (0–0) Carpet (0–0)

Result	W–L	Date	Tournament	Surface	Opponent	Score
Loss	0–1	Feb 2011	Movistar Open, Chile	Clay	(Spain) Tommy Robredo	2–6, 6–2, 6–7^{(5–7)}
Loss	0–2	Apr 2014	Barcelona Open, Spain	Clay	(Japan) Kei Nishikori	2–6, 2–6

=== Doubles: 1 (1 runner-up) ===
Legend Grand Slam Tournaments (0–0) ATP World Tour Finals (0–0) ATP World Tour Masters 1000 (0–0) ATP World Tour 500 Series (0–0) ATP World Tour 250 Series (0–1)	Finals by surface Hard (0–0) Clay (0–1) Grass (0–0) Carpet (0–0)

Result	W–L	Date	Tournament	Surface	Partner	Opponents	Score
Loss	0–1	Jul 2012	Swiss Open, Switzerland	Clay	(Colombia) Robert Farah	(Spain) Marcel Granollers (Spain) Marc López	4–6, 6–7^{(9–11)}

== ATP Challenger and ITF Futures finals ==
=== Singles: 18 (13–5) ===
Legend ATP Challenger (10–5) ITF Futures (3–0)	Finals by surface Hard (3–1) Clay (10–4) Grass (0–0)

Result	W–L	Date	Tournament	Tier	Surface	Opponent	Score
Win	1–0	Oct 2005	Medellín, Colombia	Futures	Clay	(Argentina) Luciano Vitullo	2–6, 6–4, 7–5
Win	2–0	May 2006	Cali, Colombia	Futures	Clay	(Colombia) Carlos Salamanca	6–4, 6–2
Win	3–0	Jun 2006	Sorocaba, Brazil	Futures	Clay	(Brazil) Eduardo Portal	7–6^{(8–6)}, 6–2
Win	4–0	Jul 2006	Bogotá, Colombia	Challenger	Clay	(Mexico) Bruno Echagaray	6–3, 1–6, 6–2
Win	5–0	Mar 2007	Bogotá, Colombia	Challenger	Clay	(Brazil) Flávio Saretta	7–6^{(7–4)}, 6–2
Win	6–0	Oct 2007	Quito, Ecuador	Challenger	Clay	(Ecuador) Giovanni Lapentti	7–6^{(7–4)}, 6–4
Loss	6–1	Jun 2008	Fürth, Germany	Challenger	Clay	(Austria) Daniel Köllerer	6–1, 6–3
Win	7–1	Jan 2009	Salinas, Ecuador	Challenger	Hard	(United States) Michael Russell	6–3, 6–2
Win	8–1	Apr 2009	San Luis Potosí, Mexico	Challenger	Clay	(Italy) Paolo Lorenzi	6–2, 6–7^{(3–7)}, 6–2
Win	9–1	Oct 2009	Sacramento, USA	Challenger	Hard	(United States) Jesse Levine	7–6^{(7–4)}, 6–1
Loss	9–2	Nov 2009	Guayaquil, Ecuador	Challenger	Clay	(Ecuador) Nicolás Lapentti	6–2, 2–6, 7–6^{(7–4)}
Win	10–2	Apr 2010	Pereira, Colombia	Challenger	Clay	(Italy) Paolo Lorenzi	6–3, 6–3
Loss	10–3	Jul 2012	Bogotá, Colombia	Challenger	Clay	(Colombia) Alejandro Falla	7–5, 6–3
Win	11–3	Mar 2013	Pereira, Colombia	Challenger	Clay	(Chile) Paul Capdeville	6–2, 6–4
Loss	11–3	Jul 2013	Todi, Italy	Challenger	Clay	(Spain) Pere Riba	7–6 ^{(7–5)}, 2–6, 7–6 ^{(8–6)}
Win	12–4	Jul 2016	Prague, Czech Republic	Challenger	Clay	(Belarus) Uladzimir Ignatik	6–4, 3–6, 7–6 ^{(7–2)}
Win	13–4	Oct 2016	Fairfield, USA	Challenger	Hard	(France) Quentin Halys	4–6, 6–4, 6–2
Loss	13–5	Oct 2016	Las Vegas, USA	Challenger	Hard	(Australia) Sam Groth	6–7 ^{(4–7)}, 6–4, 7–5

=== Doubles: 7 (3–4) ===
Legend ATP Challenger (2–4) ITF Futures (1–0)	Finals by surface Hard (0–0) Clay (3–4) Grass (0–0)

Result	W–L	Date	Tournament	Tier	Surface	Partner	Opponents	Score
Win	1–0	Jun 2006	Brazil F4, Piracicaba	Futures	Clay	(Colombia) Carlos Salamanca	(Brazil) Lucas Engel (Brazil) Marcelo Melo	6–2, 7–6^{(7–5)}
Loss	1–1	Jul 2006	Cuenca, Ecuador	Challenger	Clay	(Colombia) Carlos Salamanca	(Germany) Frank Moser (Germany) Alexander Satschko	6–3, 3–6, [6–10]
Loss	1–2	Jul 2008	Poznań, Poland	Challenger	Clay	(Spain) Alberto Martín	(Sweden) Johan Brunström (Netherlands Antilles) Jean-Julien Rojer	6–4, 0–6, [6–10]
Win	2–2	Nov 2008	Guayaquil, Ecuador	Challenger	Clay	(Argentina) Sebastián Decoud	(Brazil) Thiago Alves (Brazil) Ricardo Hocevar	6–4, 6–4
Loss	2–3	Jul 2009	Turin, Italy	Challenger	Clay	(Spain) Pere Riba	(Italy) Daniele Bracciali (Italy) Potito Starace	3–6, 4–6
Win	3–3	Jul 2013	Todi, Italy	Challenger	Clay	(Colombia) Cristian Rodríguez	(Italy) Andrea Arnaboldi (Italy) Gianluca Naso	4–6, 7–6^{(7–2)}, [10–3]
Loss	3–4	Aug 2017	Santo Domingo, Dominican Republic	Challenger	Clay	(Colombia) Daniel Elahi Galán	(Argentina) Juan Ignacio Londero (Venezuela) Luis David Martinez	4–6, 4–6

== Performance timelines ==
Key
W	F	SF	QF	#R	RR	Q#	P#	DNQ	A	Z#	PO	G	S	B	NMS	NTI	P	NH

(W) winner; (F) finalist; (SF) semifinalist; (QF) quarterfinalist; (#R) rounds 4, 3, 2, 1; (RR) round-robin stage; (Q#) qualification round; (P#) preliminary round; (DNQ) did not qualify; (A) absent; (Z#) Davis/Fed Cup Zonal Group (with number indication) or (PO) play-off; (G) gold, (S) silver or (B) bronze Olympic/Paralympic medal; (NMS) not a Masters tournament; (NTI) not a Tier I tournament; (P) postponed; (NH) not held; (SR) strike rate (events won / competed); (W–L) win–loss record.

=== Singles ===
Tournament	2006	2007	2008	2009	2010	2011	2012	2013	2014	2015	2016	2017	2018	2019	2020	W–L
Grand Slam tournaments
Australian Open	A	Q1	A	A	2R	2R	2R	1R	1R	2R	2R	1R	A	A	A	5–8
French Open	A	1R	1R	1R	1R	1R	3R	1R	1R	2R	1R	1R	2R	Q3	A	4–12
Wimbledon	A	Q2	A	Q1	1R	1R	1R	2R	3R	3R	1R	Q1	Q1	Q1	NH	4–7
US Open	A	Q1	Q1	Q2	1R	1R	1R	1R	1R	1R	Q3	2R	Q2	1R	A	1–8
Win–Los	0–0	0–1	0–1	0–1	1–4	1–4	3–4	1–4	2–4	3–4	1–3	1–3	1–1	0–1	0–0	14–35
National representation
Summer Olympics	Not Held		A	Not Held			2R	Not Held			A	NH				1–1
Davis Cup Singles	Z2	Z1	Z1	Z1	PO	Z1	Z1	PO	PO	PO	Z1	PO	PO	RR	QR	27–19
ATP World Tour Masters 1000
Indian Wells Masters	A	A	2R	1R	A	2R	3R	1R	2R	2R	1R	1R	A	A	NH	5–9
Miami Masters	A	A	1R	Q1	2R	1R	2R	2R	1R	3R	2R	Q1	Q1	A	NH	5–8
Monte-Carlo Masters	A	A	A	A	A	1R	A	A	A	A	Q2	A	A	A	NH	0–1
Madrid Masters	A	A	A	A	2R	2R	1R	2R	QF	1R	1R	Q2	A	A	NH	6–7
Rome Masters	A	A	A	A	3R	1R	1R	1R	1R	1R	Q1	Q1	A	A	A	2–6
Canada Masters	A	Q1	A	Q1	1R	A	A	A	1R	A	A	A	A	A	NH	0–2
Cincinnati Masters	A	A	A	Q1	1R	A	1R	A	1R	Q2	A	A	A	A	A	0–3
Shanghai Masters	NMS			A	Q2	3R	A	1R	1R	A	A	A	A	A	NH	2–3
Paris Masters	A	A	A	A	2R	1R	A	2R	2R	A	A	A	A	A	A	3–4
Win–loss	0–0	0–0	1–2	0–1	5–6	4–7	3–5	3–6	5–8	1–4	1–3	0–1	0–0	0–0	0–0	23–43
Career statistics
Titles–Finals	0–0	0–0	0–0	0–0	0–0	0–1	0–0	0–0	0–1	0–0	0–0	0–0	0–0	0–0	0–0	0–2
Year-end ranking	175	141	163	107	64	55	57	69	32	70	91	227	253	274	318	

=== Doubles ===
This table is current through Australian Open 2016.

Tournament	2010	2011	2012	2013	2014	2015	2016	W–L
Grand Slam tournaments
Australian Open	1R	1R	1R	1R	1R	2R	1R	1–7
French Open	1R	1R	1R	A	1R	2R	A	1–5
Wimbledon	1R	1R	A	1R	1R	1R	A	0–5
US Open	1R	1R	A	A	2R	2R	A	2–4
Win–loss	0–4	0–4	0–2	0–2	1–4	3–4	0–1	4–21
Olympic Games
Summer Olympics	Not Held		1R	Not Held			A	0–1

== Wins over top 10 players ==
#	Player	Rank	Event	Surface	Rd	Score
2014
1.	(United Kingdom) Andy Murray	8	Madrid, Spain	Clay	3R	6–3, 6–2
2015
2.	(Croatia) Marin Čilić	10	Geneva, Switzerland	Clay	QF	7–5, 6–3
