= 2016 Ecuador Open Quito – Doubles =

Doubles
- 2016 Ecuador Open Quito

Final
- Champions: (Spain) Pablo Carreño Busta (Argentina) Guillermo Durán
- Runners-up: (Brazil) Thomaz Bellucci (Brazil) Marcelo Demoliner
- Score: 7–5, 6–4

Details
- Draw: 16
- Seeds: 4

Events
Singles	Doubles
← 2015 ·	Ecuador Open Quito	· 2017 →

Gero Kretschmer and Alexander Satschko were the defending champions, but lost in the quarterfinals to Thomaz Bellucci and Marcelo Demoliner.

Pablo Carreño Busta and Guillermo Durán won the title, defeating Bellucci and Demoliner in the final, 7–5, 6–4.

== Seeds ==
1. (Mexico) Santiago González / (Brazil) André Sá (first round)
2. (India) Purav Raja / (United States) Rajeev Ram (first round)
3. (United States) Austin Krajicek / (United States) Nicholas Monroe (semifinals)
4. (Germany) Gero Kretschmer / (Germany) Alexander Satschko (quarterfinals)

== Draw ==
=== Key ===
- Q = Qualifier
- WC = Wild card
- LL = Lucky loser
- Alt = Alternate
- SE = Special exempt
- PR = Protected ranking
- ITF = ITF entry
- JE = Junior exempt
- w/o = Walkover
- r = Retired
- d = Defaulted
- SR = Special ranking

First round
1	(Mexico) S González (Brazil) A Sá	1	3
(Chile) J Peralta (Argentina) H Zeballos	6	6
(Slovakia) A Martin (Chile) H Podlipnik-Castillo	3	6	[10]
(Argentina) A Molteni (Argentina) G Pella	6	2	[8]
4	(Germany) G Kretschmer (Germany) A Satschko	6	6
Alt	(Serbia) D Lajović (Croatia) F Škugor	2	2
(Brazil) T Bellucci (Brazil) M Demoliner	5	6	[10]
(Spain) I Cervantes (Italy) P Lorenzi	7	3	[6]
PR	(Spain) M Granollers (Spain) P Riba	5	3
PR	(Venezuela) R Maytín (Mexico) MÁ Reyes-Varela	7	6
(Colombia) A Falla (Spain) A Ramos-Viñolas
3	(United States) A Krajicek (United States) N Monroe	w/o
WC	(Ecuador) E Gómez (Ecuador) R Quiroz	4	4
(Dominican Republic) V Estrella Burgos (Brazil) J Souza	6	6
(Spain) P Carreño Busta (Argentina) G Durán	7^{8}	6
2	(India) P Raja (United States) R Ram	6^{6}	2

Quarterfinals
(Chile) J Peralta (Argentina) H Zeballos	4	4
(Slovakia) A Martin (Chile) H Podlipnik-Castillo	6	6
4	(Germany) G Kretschmer (Germany) A Satschko	6	1	[4]
(Brazil) T Bellucci (Brazil) M Demoliner	4	6	[10]
PR	(Venezuela) R Maytín (Mexico) MÁ Reyes-Varela	3	3
3	(United States) A Krajicek (United States) N Monroe	6	6
(Dominican Republic) V Estrella Burgos (Brazil) J Souza	7	6^{3}	[7]
(Spain) P Carreño Busta (Argentina) G Durán	6^{4}	7	[10]

Semifinals
(Slovakia) A Martin (Chile) H Podlipnik-Castillo	3	6	[4]
(Brazil) T Bellucci (Brazil) M Demoliner	6	3	[10]
3	(United States) A Krajicek (United States) N Monroe	6^{5}	4
(Spain) P Carreño Busta (Argentina) G Durán	7^{7}	6

Final
(Brazil) T Bellucci (Brazil) M Demoliner	5	4
(Spain) P Carreño Busta (Argentina) G Durán	7	6
