= 2016 Ecuador Open Quito =

- Date: 1–7 February
- Edition: 2nd
- Category: ATP World Tour 250
- Draw: 28S / 16D
- Prize money: $520,070
- Surface: Clay / outdoor
- Location: Quito, Ecuador

Champions

Singles
- (Dominican Republic) Víctor Estrella Burgos

Doubles
- (Spain) Pablo Carreño Busta / (Argentina) Guillermo Durán
- Ecuador Open (tennis)

The 2016 Ecuador Open Quito was an ATP tennis tournament played on outdoor clay courts. It was the 2nd edition of the Ecuador Open Quito as part of the ATP World Tour 250 series of the 2016 ATP World Tour. It took place in Quito, Ecuador from February 1 through February 7, 2016.

== Finals ==
=== Singles ===
(Dominican Republic) Víctor Estrella Burgos defeated (Brazil) Thomaz Bellucci 4–6, 7–6^{(7–5)}, 6–2

- It was Estrella Burgos' only singles title of the year and the 2nd of his career.

=== Doubles ===
(Spain) Pablo Carreño Busta / (Argentina) Guillermo Durán defeated (Brazil) Thomaz Bellucci / (Brazil) Marcelo Demoliner 7–5, 6–4

== Points and prize money ==
=== Point distribution ===
Event	W	F	SF	QF	Round of 16	Round of 32	Q	Q2	Q1
Singles	250	150	90	45	20	0	12	6	0
Doubles	250	150	90	45	0	—N/a	—N/a	—N/a	—N/a

=== Prize money ===
Event	W	F	SF	QF	Round of 16	Round of 32	Q2	Q1
Singles	$82,450	$43,430	$23,525	$13,400	$7,900	$4,680	$2,105	$1,055
Doubles	$25,070	$13,170	$7,140	$4,080	$2,390	—N/a	—N/a	—N/a
Doubles prize money per team

== Singles main-draw entrants ==
=== Seeds ===
Country	Player	Rank^{1}	Seed
AUS	Bernard Tomic	17	1
ESP	Feliciano López	19	2
BRA	Thomaz Bellucci	37	3
ESP	Fernando Verdasco	45	4
DOM	Víctor Estrella Burgos	55	5
ITA	Paolo Lorenzi	57	6
ESP	Albert Ramos Viñolas	61	7
ESP	Pablo Carreño Busta	68	8

- Rankings were as of January 18, 2016.

=== Other entrants ===
The following players received wildcards into the singles main draw:

- (Ecuador) Gonzalo Escobar
- (Colombia) Alejandro González
- (Ecuador) Giovanni Lapentti

The following player received entry using a protected ranking:

- (Spain) Pere Riba

The following players received entry from the qualifying draw:

- (Slovakia) Jozef Kovalík
- (Slovakia) Andrej Martin
- (Argentina) Renzo Olivo
- (Brazil) João Souza

=== Withdrawals ===
Before the tournament

- (Italy) Marco Cecchinato →replaced by (Colombia) Alejandro Falla
- (Austria) Andreas Haider-Maurer →replaced by (Argentina) Horacio Zeballos
- (Croatia) Ivo Karlović →replaced by (Brazil) Rogério Dutra Silva

=== Retirements ===
- (Spain) Feliciano López (fatigue)

== Doubles main-draw entrants ==
=== Seeds ===
Country	Player	Country	Player	Rank^{1}	Seed
MEX	Santiago González	BRA	André Sá	100	1
IND	Purav Raja	USA	Rajeev Ram	139	2
USA	Austin Krajicek	USA	Nicholas Monroe	142	3
GER	Gero Kretschmer	GER	Alexander Satschko	164	4

- Rankings were as of January 18, 2016.

=== Other entrants ===
The following pairs received wildcards into the doubles main draw:

- (Ecuador) Emilio Gómez / (Ecuador) Roberto Quiroz
- (Ecuador) Giovanni Lapentti / (Spain) Fernando Verdasco

The following pairs received entry as alternates:

- (Serbia) Dušan Lajović / (Croatia) Franko Škugor

=== Withdrawals ===
Before the tournament

- (Spain) Fernando Verdasco (neck injury)

During the tournament

- (Spain) Albert Ramos Viñolas (stomach illness)
