= 2017 Ecuador Open Quito – Singles =

Singles
- 2017 Ecuador Open Quito

Final
- Champion: (Dominican Republic) Víctor Estrella Burgos
- Runner-up: (Italy) Paolo Lorenzi
- Score: 6–7^{(2–7)}, 7–5, 7–6^{(8–6)}

Details
- Draw: 28 (4 Q / 3 WC )
- Seeds: 8

Events
| Singles | Doubles |
| ← 2016 · | Ecuador Open Quito | · 2018 → |

Víctor Estrella Burgos was the two-time defending champion and successfully defended his title, defeating Paolo Lorenzi in the final, 6–7^{(2–7)}, 7–5, 7–6^{(8–6)}.

== Seeds ==
The top four seeds receive a bye into the second round.

1. (Croatia) Ivo Karlović (second round)
2. (Spain) Albert Ramos Viñolas (semifinals)
3. (Italy) Paolo Lorenzi (final)
4. (Brazil) Thomaz Bellucci (semifinals)
5. (Ukraine) Alexandr Dolgopolov (first round)
6. (Argentina) Horacio Zeballos (first round)
7. (Brazil) Thiago Monteiro (first round)
8. (Argentina) Renzo Olivo (quarterfinals)

== Draw ==
=== Key ===
- Q = Qualifier
- WC = Wild card
- LL = Lucky loser
- Alt = Alternate
- SE = Special exempt
- PR = Protected ranking
- ITF = ITF entry
- JE = Junior exempt
- w/o = Walkover
- r = Retired
- d = Defaulted
- SR = Special ranking

=== Finals ===
Semifinals
(Dominican Republic) Víctor Estrella Burgos | 7^{7} | 7^{7}
4 | (Brazil) Thomaz Bellucci | 6^{4} | 6^{3}
3 | (Italy) Paolo Lorenzi | 6 | 6
2 | (Spain) Albert Ramos Viñolas | 1 | 4

Final
(Dominican Republic) Víctor Estrella Burgos | 6^{2} | 7 | 7^{8}
3 | (Italy) Paolo Lorenzi | 7^{7} | 5 | 6^{6}

=== Top half ===
First round
(Slovakia) A Martin | 6 | 2 | 4
(Dominican Republic) V Estrella Burgos | 3 | 6 | 6
(Brazil) J Souza | 7 | 4 | 5
Q | (Italy) F Gaio | 5 | 6 | 7
(Austria) G Melzer | 6^{4} | 6 | 7^{7}
6 | (Argentina) H Zeballos | 7^{7} | 3 | 6^{4}
(Spain) D Gimeno Traver | 1^{r}
WC | (Serbia) J Tipsarević | 4
(Germany) B Becker | 4 | 4
(Colombia) S Giraldo | 6 | 6
WC | (Ecuador) E Gómez | 7 | 2 | 6^{5}
8 | (Argentina) R Olivo | 5 | 6 | 7^{7}

Second round
1 | (Croatia) I Karlović | 7^{9} | 6^{5} | 6^{8}
(Dominican Republic) V Estrella Burgos | 6^{7} | 7^{7} | 7^{10}
Q | (Italy) F Gaio | 6^{4} | 6 | 7^{7}
(Austria) G Melzer | 7^{7} | 3 | 6^{2}
4 | (Brazil) T Bellucci | 7^{10} | 7^{7}
WC | (Serbia) J Tipsarević | 6^{8} | 6^{2}
(Colombia) S Giraldo | 6^{3} | 6 | 3
8 | (Argentina) R Olivo | 7^{7} | 2 | 6

Quarterfinals
(Dominican Republic) V Estrella Burgos | 6 | 6
Q | (Italy) F Gaio | 4 | 4
4 | (Brazil) T Bellucci | 6 | 6
8 | (Argentina) R Olivo | 2 | 1

Semifinals
(Dominican Republic) V Estrella Burgos | 7^{7} | 7^{7}
4 | (Brazil) T Bellucci | 6^{4} | 6^{3}

=== Bottom half ===
First round
5 | (Ukraine) A Dolgopolov | 6 | 6^{4} | 3
(United States) R Ram | 3 | 7^{7} | 6
(Argentina) N Kicker | 4 | 6 | 6
(Argentina) G Andreozzi | 6 | 3 | 4
Q | (Argentina) A Velotti | 6 | 4 | 3
PR | (Australia) M Ebden | 2 | 6 | 6
7 | (Brazil) T Monteiro | 3 | 2
WC | (Ecuador) G Lapentti | 6 | 6
Q | (Spain) R Carballés Baena | 6 | 6
(Brazil) R Dutra Silva | 3 | 1
Q | (Colombia) A Falla | 6 | 6
(Italy) A Giannessi | 4 | 3

Second round
(United States) R Ram | 7^{7} | 6
(Argentina) N Kicker | 6^{5} | 3
PR | (Australia) M Ebden | 4 | 4
3 | (Italy) P Lorenzi | 6 | 6
WC | (Ecuador) G Lapentti | 3 | 4
Q | (Spain) R Carballés Baena | 6 | 6
Q | (Colombia) A Falla | 2 | 5
2 | (Spain) A Ramos Viñolas | 6 | 7

Quarterfinals
(United States) R Ram | 3 | 4
3 | (Italy) P Lorenzi | 6 | 6
Q | (Spain) R Carballés Baena | 5 | 6 | 2
2 | (Spain) A Ramos Viñolas | 7 | 4 | 6

Semifinals
3 | (Italy) P Lorenzi | 6 | 6
2 | (Spain) A Ramos Viñolas | 1 | 4

== Qualifying ==
=== Seeds ===
1. (Spain) Roberto Carballés Baena (qualified)
2. (Spain) Rubén Ramírez Hidalgo (first round)
3. (Italy) Federico Gaio (qualified)
4. (Argentina) Agustín Velotti (qualified)
5. (Italy) Marco Cecchinato (qualifying competition)
6. (United States) Alexander Sarkissian (qualifying competition)
7. (Spain) Adrián Menéndez Maceiras (first round)
8. (Brazil) Caio Zampieri (qualifying competition)

=== Qualifiers ===
1. (Spain) Roberto Carballés Baena
2. (Colombia) Alejandro Falla
3. (Italy) Federico Gaio
4. (Argentina) Agustín Velotti

=== Qualifying draw ===
==== First qualifier ====
First round
1 | (Spain) Roberto Carballés Baena | 6 | 6
WC | (Argentina) Andrés Molteni | 3 | 4
(Argentina) Juan Pablo Paz | 4 | 4
6 | (United States) Alexander Sarkissian | 6 | 6

Qualifying competition
1 | (Spain) Roberto Carballés Baena | 3 | 7^{8} | 6
6 | (United States) Alexander Sarkissian | 6 | 6^{6} | 4

==== Second qualifier ====
First round
2 | (Spain) Rubén Ramírez Hidalgo | 4 | 6 | 1
(Colombia) Alejandro Falla | 6 | 3 | 6
(Argentina) Andrea Collarini | 3 | 4
8 | (Brazil) Caio Zampieri | 6 | 6

Qualifying competition
(Colombia) Alejandro Falla | 6 | 6
8 | (Brazil) Caio Zampieri | 4 | 4

==== Third qualifier ====
First round
3 | (Italy) Federico Gaio | 6 | 3 | 7^{7}
(Colombia) Daniel Elahi Galán | 2 | 6 | 6^{2}
(Brazil) Guilherme Clezar | 6 | 6^{4} | 6^{5}
5 | (Italy) Marco Cecchinato | 4 | 7^{7} | 7^{7}

Qualifying competition
3 | (Italy) Federico Gaio | 6^{3} | 7^{7} | 6
5 | (Italy) Marco Cecchinato | 7^{7} | 6^{5} | 4

==== Fourth qualifier ====
First round
4 | (Argentina) Agustín Velotti | 6 | 6
WC | (Ecuador) Camilo Ponce | 3 | 1
(Colombia) Eduardo Struvay | 6 | 7^{7}
7 | (Spain) Adrián Menéndez Maceiras | 3 | 6^{1}

Qualifying competition
4 | (Argentina) Agustín Velotti | 1 | 7 | 6
(Colombia) Eduardo Struvay | 6 | 5 | 4
