= 2015 Ecuador Open Quito =

- Date: 2–8 February
- Edition: 1st
- Category: ATP World Tour 250
- Draw: 28S / 16D
- Prize money: $494,310
- Surface: Clay
- Location: Quito, Ecuador

Champions

Singles
- (Dominican Republic) Víctor Estrella Burgos

Doubles
- (Germany) Gero Kretschmer / (Germany) Alexander Satschko
- Ecuador Open

The 2015 Ecuador Open Quito was an ATP tennis tournament played on outdoor clay courts. It was the 1st edition of the Ecuador Open as part of the ATP World Tour 250 series of the 2015 ATP World Tour. It took place in Quito, Ecuador from February 2 through February 8, 2015.

== Finals ==
=== Singles ===
- (Dominican Republic) Víctor Estrella Burgos defeated (Spain) Feliciano López, 6–2, 6–7^{(5–7)}, 7–6^{(7–5)}

=== Doubles ===
- (Germany) Gero Kretschmer / (Germany) Alexander Satschko defeated (Dominican Republic) Víctor Estrella Burgos / (Brazil) João Souza, 7–5, 7–6^{(7–3)}

== Singles main-draw entrants ==
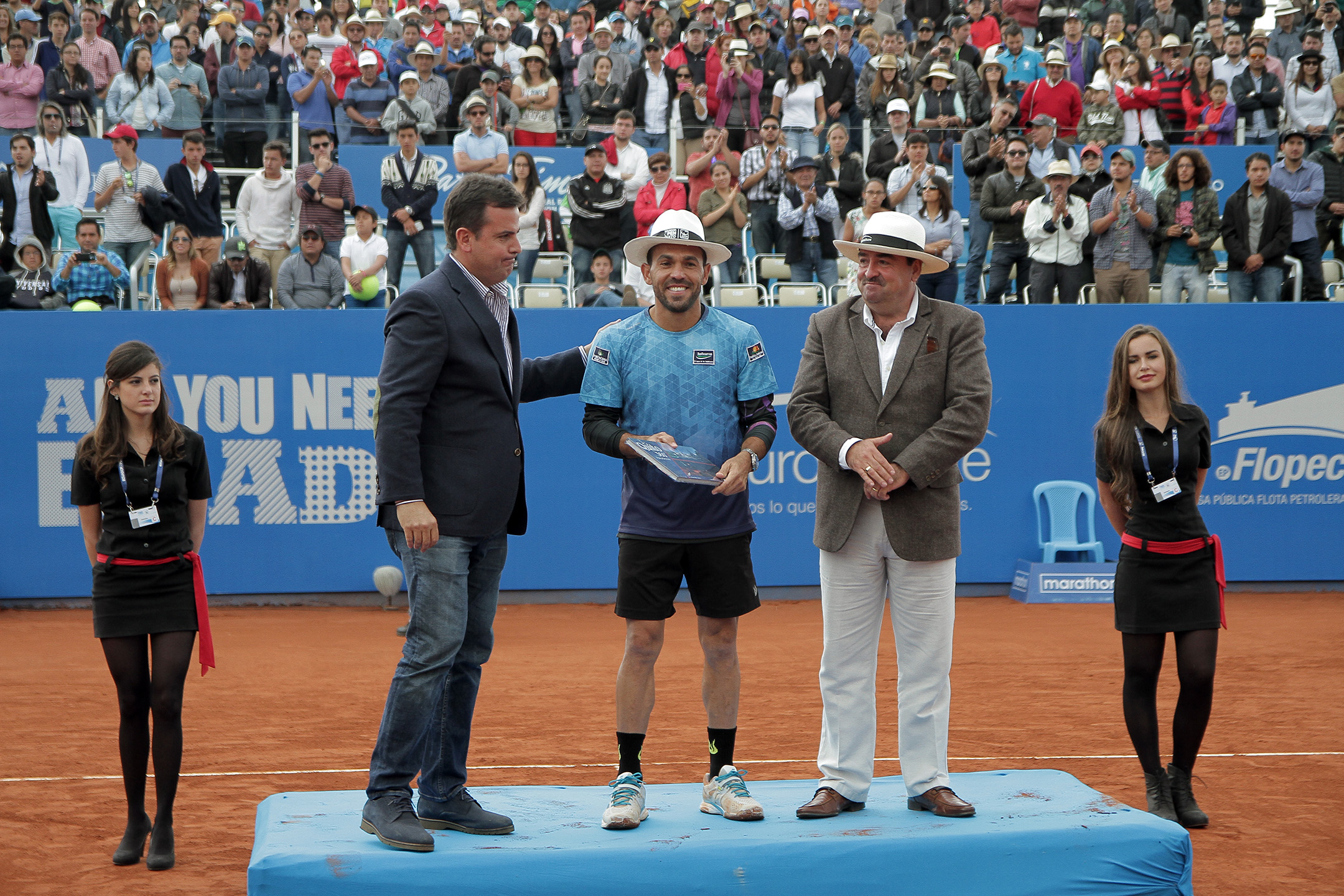
Víctor Estrella Burgos after winning the 2015 Ecuador Open Quito.

=== Seeds ===
Country	Player	Rank^{1}	Seed
ESP	Feliciano López	14	1
COL	Santiago Giraldo	32	2
ESP	Fernando Verdasco	33	3
SVK	Martin Kližan	34	4
ITA	Paolo Lorenzi	64	5
BRA	Thomaz Bellucci	65	6
SRB	Dušan Lajović	68	7
DOM	Víctor Estrella Burgos	77	8

- Rankings were as of January 19, 2015.

=== Other entrants ===
The following players received wildcards into the singles main draw:

- (Ecuador) Gonzalo Escobar
- (Hungary) Márton Fucsovics
- (Ecuador) Giovanni Lapentti

The following players received entry from the qualifying draw:

- (Brazil) André Ghem
- (Chile) Nicolás Jarry
- (Austria) Gerald Melzer
- (Argentina) Renzo Olivo

=== Withdrawals ===
Before the tournament

- (Australia) Sam Groth → replaced by (Russia) Evgeny Donskoy
- (Serbia) Filip Krajinović → replaced by (Spain) Adrián Menéndez Maceiras
- (Spain) Pere Riba → replaced by (Argentina) Facundo Argüello
- (Chinese Taipei) Jimmy Wang → replaced by (Italy) Luca Vanni

== Doubles main-draw entrants ==
=== Seeds ===
Country	Player	Country	Player	Rank^{1}	Seed
PHI	Treat Huey	USA	Scott Lipsky	85	1
ESP	Feliciano López	AUT	Oliver Marach	119	2
SWE	Johan Brunström	USA	Nicholas Monroe	132	3
BRA	Marcelo Demoliner	USA	Austin Krajicek	171	4

- Rankings were as of January 19, 2015.

=== Other entrants ===
The following pairs received wildcards into the doubles main draw:

- (Chile) Nicolás Jarry / (Ecuador) Giovanni Lapentti
- (Spain) Sergio Pérez-Pérez / (Spain) Fernando Verdasco

The following pair received entry as alternates:

- (Germany) Gero Kretschmer / (Germany) Alexander Satschko

=== Withdrawals ===
Before the tournament

- (Argentina) Facundo Argüello (stomach pain)
