= 2018 Ecuador Open Quito – Doubles =

Doubles
- 2018 Ecuador Open Quito

Final
- Champions: (Chile) Nicolás Jarry (Chile) Hans Podlipnik-Castillo
- Runners-up: (United States) Austin Krajicek (United States) Jackson Withrow
- Score: 7–6^{(8–6)}, 6–3

Events
Singles	Doubles
- Ecuador Open Quito

James Cerretani and Philipp Oswald were the defending champions, but Cerretani chose to compete in Sofia instead. Oswald played alongside Treat Huey, but lost in the first round to Alessandro Motti and Stefano Travaglia.

Nicolás Jarry and Hans Podlipnik-Castillo won the title, defeating Austin Krajicek and Jackson Withrow in the final, 7–6^{(8–6)}, 6–3.

== Seeds ==
1. (Brazil) Marcelo Demoliner / (India) Purav Raja (first round)
2. (Philippines) Treat Huey / (Austria) Philipp Oswald (first round)
3. (Mexico) Santiago González / (Mexico) Miguel Ángel Reyes Varela (quarterfinals)
4. (Spain) Pablo Carreño Busta / (Argentina) Guillermo Durán (first round)

== Draw ==
Key

- Q = Qualifier
- WC = Wild card
- LL = Lucky loser
- Alt = Alternate
- ITF = ITF entry
- PR = Protected ranking
- SR = Special ranking
- SE = Special exempt
- JE = Junior exempt
- JR = Junior Accelerator Programme entrant
- CO = College Accelerator Programme entrant
- NG = Next Gen Accelerator Program entrant
- w/o = Walkover
- r = Retired
- d = Defaulted

=== Draw ===
First round
1	(Brazil) M Demoliner (India) P Raja	7^{7}	4	[12]
WC	(France) D Descloix (France) G Monfils	6^{2}	6	[14]
Alt	(Italy) F Gaio (Slovakia) A Martin	1	5
(Dominican Republic) V Estrella Burgos (Norway) C Ruud	6	7
3	(Mexico) S González (Mexico) MÁ Reyes Varela	6	6
(Italy) A Giannessi (Italy) P Lorenzi	3	3
Alt	(Argentina) F Bagnis (Brazil) J Souza	0	6^{2}
(Chile) N Jarry (Chile) H Podlipnik-Castillo	6	7^{7}
(United States) A Krajicek (United States) J Withrow	6	6
(Spain) R Carballés Baena (Italy) M Cecchinato	3	4
Alt	(Peru) S Galdós (Austria) G Melzer	7	6
4	(Spain) P Carreño Busta (Argentina) G Durán	5	4
(Belarus) A Bury (Chinese Taipei) H-y Peng	3	5
WC	(Ecuador) G Escobar (Ecuador) R Quiroz	6	7
(Italy) A Motti (Italy) S Travaglia	6	6
2	(Philippines) T Huey (Austria) P Oswald	4	4

Quarterfinals
WC	(France) D Descloix (France) G Monfils	6	7
(Dominican Republic) V Estrella Burgos (Norway) C Ruud	2	5
3	(Mexico) S González (Mexico) MÁ Reyes Varela	7^{7}	4	[6]
(Chile) N Jarry (Chile) H Podlipnik-Castillo	6^{2}	6	[10]
(United States) A Krajicek (United States) J Withrow	6	7^{7}
Alt	(Peru) S Galdós (Austria) G Melzer	4	6^{3}
WC	(Ecuador) G Escobar (Ecuador) R Quiroz	6^{6}	7^{7}	[7]
(Italy) A Motti (Italy) S Travaglia	7^{8}	6^{5}	[10]

Semifinals
WC	(France) D Descloix (France) G Monfils	3	3
(Chile) N Jarry (Chile) H Podlipnik-Castillo	6	6
(United States) A Krajicek (United States) J Withrow	6	7^{7}
(Italy) A Motti (Italy) S Travaglia	4	6^{5}

Final
(Chile) N Jarry (Chile) H Podlipnik-Castillo	7^{8}	6
(United States) A Krajicek (United States) J Withrow	6^{6}	3
