= 2017 Ecuador Open Quito – Doubles =

Doubles
- 2017 Ecuador Open Quito

Final
- Champions: (United States) James Cerretani (Austria) Philipp Oswald
- Runners-up: (Chile) Julio Peralta (Argentina) Horacio Zeballos
- Score: 6−3, 2−1, ret.

Events
Singles	Doubles
- Ecuador Open Quito

Pablo Carreño Busta and Guillermo Durán were the defending champions, but Carreño Busta decided not to participate this year. Durán played alongside Andrés Molteni, but lost in the quarterfinals to Víctor Estrella Burgos and Renzo Olivo.

James Cerretani and Philipp Oswald won the title when Julio Peralta and Horacio Zeballos retired in the final.

== Seeds ==
1. (Mexico) Santiago González / (Spain) David Marrero (first round)
2. (Chile) Julio Peralta / (Argentina) Horacio Zeballos (final, retired)
3. (United States) Nicholas Monroe / (New Zealand) Artem Sitak (semifinals)
4. (Argentina) Guillermo Durán / (Argentina) Andrés Molteni (quarterfinals)

== Draw ==
Key

- Q = Qualifier
- WC = Wild card
- LL = Lucky loser
- Alt = Alternate
- ITF = ITF entry
- PR = Protected ranking
- SR = Special ranking
- SE = Special exempt
- JE = Junior exempt
- JR = Junior Accelerator Programme entrant
- CO = College Accelerator Programme entrant
- NG = Next Gen Accelerator Program entrant
- w/o = Walkover
- r = Retired
- d = Defaulted

=== Draw ===
First round
1	(Mexico) S González (Spain) D Marrero	4	5
(United States) J Cerretani (Austria) P Oswald	6	7
(Germany) A Begemann (United States) S Lipsky	5	5
(Italy) A Giannessi (Italy) P Lorenzi	7	7
3	(United States) N Monroe (New Zealand) A Sitak	7^{7}	7^{10}
(Peru) S Galdós (India) J Nedunchezhiyan	6^{5}	6^{8}
WC	(Ecuador) G Escobar (Argentina) JP Paz	3	6	[10]
(United States) R Ram (Serbia) J Tipsarević	6	3	[8]
(Brazil) T Bellucci (Brazil) T Monteiro	6	6^{5}	[5]
(Dominican Republic) V Estrella Burgos (Argentina) R Olivo	2	7^{7}	[10]
(Spain) R Ramírez Hidalgo (Spain) A Ramos Viñolas	6^{4}	4
4	(Argentina) G Durán (Argentina) A Molteni	7^{7}	6
(Chile) H Podlipnik-Castillo (United States) M Schnur	5	7^{7}	[10]
WC	(Ecuador) G Lapentti (Ecuador) N Lapentti	7	6^{4}	[8]
(Slovakia) A Martin (Austria) G Melzer	5	3
2	(Chile) J Peralta (Argentina) H Zeballos	7	6

Quarterfinals
(United States) J Cerretani (Austria) P Oswald	4	6	[10]
(Italy) A Giannessi (Italy) P Lorenzi	6	1	[8]
3	(United States) N Monroe (New Zealand) A Sitak	7	4	[10]
WC	(Ecuador) G Escobar (Argentina) JP Paz	5	6	[7]
(Dominican Republic) V Estrella Burgos (Argentina) R Olivo	6	6^{6}	[10]
4	(Argentina) G Durán (Argentina) A Molteni	3	7^{8}	[6]
(Chile) H Podlipnik-Castillo (United States) M Schnur	3	5
2	(Chile) J Peralta (Argentina) H Zeballos	6	7

Semifinals
(United States) J Cerretani (Austria) P Oswald	6	5	[10]
3	(United States) N Monroe (New Zealand) A Sitak	3	7	[3]
(Dominican Republic) V Estrella Burgos (Argentina) R Olivo	2	7^{7}	[2]
2	(Chile) J Peralta (Argentina) H Zeballos	6	6^{5}	[10]

Final
(United States) J Cerretani (Austria) P Oswald	6	2
2	(Chile) J Peralta (Argentina) H Zeballos	3	1^{r}
