= 2017 Ecuador Open Quito =

- Date: 6–12 February
- Edition: 3rd
- Category: ATP World Tour 250
- Draw: 28S / 16D
- Prize money: $482,060
- Surface: Clay / outdoor
- Location: Quito, Ecuador

Champions

Singles
- (Dominican Republic) Víctor Estrella Burgos

Doubles
- (United States) James Cerretani / (Austria) Philipp Oswald
- Ecuador Open

The 2017 Ecuador Open Quito was an ATP men's tennis tournament played on outdoor clay courts. It was the 3rd edition of the Ecuador Open Quito as part of the ATP World Tour 250 series of the 2017 ATP World Tour. It took place in Quito, Ecuador from 6 February through 12 February 2017. Unseeded Víctor Estrella Burgos won the singles title.

== Finals ==
=== Singles ===
- (Dominican Republic) Víctor Estrella Burgos defeated (Italy) Paolo Lorenzi, 6–7^{(2–7)}, 7–5, 7–6^{(8–6)}

=== Doubles ===
- (United States) James Cerretani / (Austria) Philipp Oswald defeated (Chile) Julio Peralta / (Argentina) Horacio Zeballos, 6–3, 2–1, ret.

== Points and prize money ==
=== Point distribution ===
Event	W	F	SF	QF	Round of 16	Round of 32	Q	Q2	Q1
Singles	250	150	90	45	20	0	12	6	0
Doubles	250	150	90	45	0	—N/a	—N/a	—N/a	—N/a

=== Prize money ===
Event	W	F	SF	QF	Round of 16	Round of 32	Q2	Q1
Singles	$85,945	$45,265	$24,520	$13,970	$8,230	$4,875	$2,195	$1,100
Doubles	$26,110	$13,730	$7,440	$4,260	$2,490	—N/a	—N/a	—N/a
Doubles prize money per team

== Singles main-draw entrants ==
=== Seeds ===
Country	Player	Rank^{1}	Seed
CRO	Ivo Karlović	19	1
ESP	Albert Ramos Viñolas	30	2
ITA	Paolo Lorenzi	43	3
BRA	Thomaz Bellucci	67	4
UKR	Alexandr Dolgopolov	69	5
ARG	Horacio Zeballos	72	6
BRA	Thiago Monteiro	86	7
ARG	Renzo Olivo	88	8

- ^{1} Rankings are as of January 30, 2017.

=== Other entrants ===
The following players received wildcards into the singles main draw:

- (Ecuador) Emilio Gómez
- (Ecuador) Giovanni Lapentti
- (Serbia) Janko Tipsarević

The following players received entry from the qualifying draw:

- (Spain) Roberto Carballés Baena
- (Colombia) Alejandro Falla
- (Italy) Federico Gaio
- (Argentina) Agustín Velotti

=== Withdrawals ===
Before the tournament

- (Spain) Pablo Carreño Busta →replaced by (United States) Rajeev Ram
- (Spain) Íñigo Cervantes →replaced by (Brazil) João Souza
- (Argentina) Guido Pella →replaced by (Italy) Alessandro Giannessi
- (Portugal) João Sousa →replaced by (Slovakia) Andrej Martin

== Doubles main-draw entrants ==
=== Seeds ===
Country	Player	Country	Player	Rank^{1}	Seed
MEX	Santiago González	ESP	David Marrero	95	1
CHI	Julio Peralta	ARG	Horacio Zeballos	95	2
USA	Nicholas Monroe	NZL	Artem Sitak	102	3
ARG	Guillermo Durán	ARG	Andrés Molteni	111	4

- ^{1} Rankings are as of January 30, 2017.

=== Other entrants ===
The following pairs received wildcards into the doubles main draw:

- (Ecuador) Gonzalo Escobar / (Argentina) Juan Pablo Paz
- (Ecuador) Giovanni Lapentti / (Ecuador) Nicolás Lapentti
