= 2015 Ecuador Open Quito – Singles =

Singles
- 2015 Ecuador Open Quito

Final
- Champion: (Dominican Republic) Víctor Estrella Burgos
- Runner-up: (Spain) Feliciano López
- Score: 6–2, 6–7^{(5–7)}, 7–6^{(7–5)}

Details
- Draw: 28
- Seeds: 8

Events
Singles	Doubles
- Ecuador Open Quito

This was the first edition of the tournament.

Víctor Estrella Burgos won the title, defeating Feliciano López in the final, 6–2, 6–7^{(5–7)}, 7–6^{(7–5)}. Burgos became the oldest first-time ATP champion in the Open Era, a record which would be surpassed by Paolo Lorenzi at the 2016 Generali Open Kitzbühel.

== Seeds ==
The top four seeds receive a bye into the second round.

1. (Spain) Feliciano López (final)
2. (Colombia) Santiago Giraldo (second round)
3. (Spain) Fernando Verdasco (semifinals)
4. (Slovakia) Martin Kližan (quarterfinals)
5. (Italy) Paolo Lorenzi (quarterfinals)
6. (Brazil) Thomaz Bellucci (semifinals)
7. (Serbia) Dušan Lajović (quarterfinals)
8. (Dominican Republic) Víctor Estrella Burgos (champion)

== Draw ==
Key

- Q = Qualifier
- WC = Wild card
- LL = Lucky loser
- Alt = Alternate
- ITF = ITF entry
- PR = Protected ranking
- SR = Special ranking
- SE = Special exempt
- JE = Junior exempt
- JR = Junior Accelerator Programme entrant
- CO = College Accelerator Programme entrant
- NG = Next Gen Accelerator Program entrant
- w/o = Walkover
- r = Retired
- d = Defaulted

=== Finals ===
Semifinals
1	(Spain) Feliciano López	7^{7}	7^{7}
3	(Spain) Fernando Verdasco	6^{5}	6^{1}
8	(Dominican Republic) Víctor Estrella Burgos	7^{7}	7
6	(Brazil) Thomaz Bellucci	6^{5}	5

Final
1	(Spain) Feliciano López	2	7^{7}	6^{5}
8	(Dominican Republic) Víctor Estrella Burgos	6	6^{5}	7^{7}

=== Top half ===
First round
(Argentina) F Bagnis	2	4
(Colombia) A González	6	6
WC	(Ecuador) G Escobar	6	4	3
Q	(Chile) N Jarry	2	6	6
(Italy) L Vanni	6^{3}	4
7	(Serbia) D Lajović	7^{7}	6
(Austria) A Haider-Maurer	6	6^{1}	6^{6}
Q	(Austria) G Melzer	1	7^{7}	7^{8}
(Brazil) J Souza	7^{7}	1	4
(Colombia) A Falla	6^{3}	6	6
(Spain) A Menéndez Maceiras	6	4	6^{1}
5	(Italy) P Lorenzi	4	6	7^{7}

Second round
1	(Spain) F López	7	6
(Colombia) A González	5	2
Q	(Chile) N Jarry	4	6	3
7	(Serbia) D Lajović	6	3	6
3	(Spain) F Verdasco	7^{7}	6
Q	(Austria) G Melzer	6^{2}	4
(Colombia) A Falla	5	1
5	(Italy) P Lorenzi	7	6

Quarterfinals
1	(Spain) F López	4	7	6
7	(Serbia) D Lajović	6	5	1
3	(Spain) F Verdasco	6	6
5	(Italy) P Lorenzi	1	2

Semifinals
1	(Spain) F López	7^{7}	7^{7}
3	(Spain) F Verdasco	6^{5}	6^{1}

=== Bottom half ===
First round
8	(Dominican Republic) V Estrella Burgos	6	6
Q	(Brazil) A Ghem	4	4
Q	(Argentina) R Olivo	7^{7}	3	6
(Russia) E Donskoy	6^{5}	6	1
WC	(Hungary) M Fucsovics	6	4	4
(Spain) D Gimeno Traver	3	6	6
6	(Brazil) T Bellucci	6	6^{4}	6
WC	(Ecuador) G Lapentti	3	7^{7}	2
(Argentina) H Zeballos	7^{7}	6
(United States) A Krajicek	6^{3}	4
(Argentina) F Argüello	1	3
(Spain) A Montañés	6	6

Second round
8	(Dominican Republic) V Estrella Burgos	7^{7}	6
Q	(Argentina) R Olivo	6^{5}	4
(Spain) D Gimeno Traver	3	7	5
4	(Slovakia) M Kližan	6	5	7
6	(Brazil) T Bellucci	6	3	7^{8}
(Argentina) H Zeballos	2	6	6^{6}
(Spain) A Montañés	7^{7}	7
2	(Colombia) S Giraldo	6^{1}	5

Quarterfinals
8	(Dominican Republic) V Estrella Burgos	6	6
4	(Slovakia) M Kližan	2	2
6	(Brazil) T Bellucci	6	7^{8}
(Spain) A Montañés	3	6^{6}

Semifinals
8	(Dominican Republic) V Estrella Burgos	7^{7}	7
6	(Brazil) T Bellucci	6^{5}	5

== Qualifying ==
=== Seeds ===
1. (Netherlands) Thiemo de Bakker (first round)
2. (Australia) Jason Kubler (second round)
3. (Romania) Adrian Ungur (second round)
4. (Austria) Gerald Melzer (qualified)
5. (Brazil) André Ghem (qualified)
6. (Spain) Roberto Carballés Baena (qualifying competition)
7. (Sweden) Elias Ymer (first round)
8. (Brazil) Fabiano de Paula (second round)

=== Qualifiers ===
1. (Brazil) André Ghem
2. (Chile) Nicolás Jarry
3. (Argentina) Renzo Olivo
4. (Austria) Gerald Melzer

=== Qualifying draw ===
==== First qualifier ====
First round
1	(Netherlands) Thiemo de Bakker	4	3
(Argentina) Juan Ignacio Londero	6	6
(Ecuador) Iván Endara	7	4	6
(Austria) Bastian Trinker	5	6	3
(Brazil) Marcelo Demoliner	1	4
(Chile) Cristian Garín	6	6
(Brazil) Thiago Monteiro	6^{5}	4
5	(Brazil) André Ghem	7^{7}	6

Second round
(Argentina) Juan Ignacio Londero	6	3	6
(Ecuador) Iván Endara	4	6	2
(Chile) Cristian Garín	4	2
5	(Brazil) André Ghem	6	6

Qualifying competition
(Argentina) Juan Ignacio Londero	3	7	2
5	(Brazil) André Ghem	6	5	6

==== Second qualifier ====
First round
2	(Australia) Jason Kubler	6	6
WC	(Austria) Oliver Marach	2	4
(Brazil) Guilherme Clezar	6	5	6
(Japan) Ryusei Makiguchi	3	7	4
(Brazil) Pedro Sakamoto	4	6^{4}
(Chile) Nicolás Jarry	6	7^{7}
(Peru) Mauricio Echazú	1	1
8	(Brazil) Fabiano de Paula	6	6

Second round
2	(Australia) Jason Kubler	4	5
(Brazil) Guilherme Clezar	6	7
(Chile) Nicolás Jarry	6	2	7^{7}
8	(Brazil) Fabiano de Paula	1	6	6^{4}

Qualifying competition
(Brazil) Guilherme Clezar	6^{2}	4
(Chile) Nicolás Jarry	7^{7}	6

==== Third qualifier ====
First round
3	(Romania) Adrian Ungur	6	6
(Bolivia) Hugo Dellien	3	4
WC	(Peru) Sergio Galdós	6	3	2
(Argentina) Renzo Olivo	3	6	6
Alt	(Italy) Enrico Becuzzi	0	1
(Sweden) Christian Lindell	6	6
(Spain) Íñigo Cervantes	6	6
7	(Sweden) Elias Ymer	4	4

Second round
3	(Romania) Adrian Ungur	4	6	3
(Argentina) Renzo Olivo	6	1	6
(Sweden) Christian Lindell	6^{2}	6	6
(Spain) Íñigo Cervantes	7^{7}	4	2

Qualifying competition
(Argentina) Renzo Olivo	7^{7}	6
(Sweden) Christian Lindell	6^{4}	3

==== Fourth qualifier ====
First round
4	(Austria) Gerald Melzer	6	6
(Mexico) Miguel Ángel Reyes-Varela	4	4
(Brazil) Pedro Bernardi	4	4
WC	(Sweden) Johan Brunström	6	6
(Chile) Gonzalo Lama	3	6	6
WC	(United States) Nicholas Monroe	6	4	3
(Argentina) Andrea Collarini	5	6	3
6	(Spain) Roberto Carballés Baena	7	3	6

Second round
4	(Austria) Gerald Melzer	6	7^{7}
WC	(Sweden) Johan Brunström	3	6^{4}
(Chile) Gonzalo Lama	3	4
6	(Spain) Roberto Carballés Baena	6	6

Qualifying competition
4	(Austria) Gerald Melzer	7^{7}	4	7^{7}
6	(Spain) Roberto Carballés Baena	6^{4}	6	6^{3}
