= 2018 Ecuador Open Quito =

- Date: 5–11 February
- Edition: 4th
- Category: ATP World Tour 250
- Draw: 28S / 16D
- Prize money: $482,060
- Surface: Clay / outdoor
- Location: Quito, Ecuador

Champions

Singles
- (Spain) Roberto Carballés Baena

Doubles
- (Chile) Nicolás Jarry / (Chile) Hans Podlipnik-Castillo
- Ecuador Open

The 2018 Ecuador Open Quito was an ATP men's tennis tournament played on outdoor clay courts. It was the 4th edition of the Ecuador Open Quito as part of the ATP World Tour 250 series of the 2018 ATP World Tour. It took place in Quito, Ecuador from 5 February through 11 February 2018. Unseeded Roberto Carballés Baena, who entered the main draw as a qualifier, won the singles title.

== Points and prize money ==
=== Point distribution ===
Event	W	F	SF	QF	Round of 16	Round of 32	Q	Q2	Q1
Singles	250	150	90	45	20	0	12	6	0
Doubles	250	150	90	45	0	—N/a	—N/a	—N/a	—N/a

=== Prize money ===
Event	W	F	SF	QF	Round of 16	Round of 32	Q2	Q1
Singles	$85,945	$45,265	$24,520	$13,970	$8,230	$4,875	$2,195	$1,100
Doubles	$26,110	$13,730	$7,440	$4,260	$2,490	—N/a	—N/a	—N/a
Doubles prize money per team

== Singles main draw entrants ==
=== Seeds ===
Country	Player	Rank^{1}	Seed
ESP	Pablo Carreño Busta	10	1
ESP	Albert Ramos Viñolas	21	2
FRA	Gaël Monfils	44	3
ITA	Paolo Lorenzi	46	4
ARG	Horacio Zeballos	66	5
DOM	Víctor Estrella Burgos	86	6
CRO	Ivo Karlović	90	7
CHI	Nicolás Jarry	95	8

- ^{1} Rankings are as of January 29, 2018.

=== Other entrants ===
The following players received wildcards into the singles main draw:

- (France) Corentin Moutet
- (Ecuador) Roberto Quiroz
- (Spain) ~~Tommy Robredo~~

The following players received entry using a protected ranking:

- (Spain) Pablo Andújar

The following players received entry from the qualifying draw:

- (Argentina) Facundo Bagnis
- (Spain) Roberto Carballés Baena
- (Italy) Federico Gaio
- (Slovakia) Andrej Martin

The following player received entry as a lucky loser:

- (Italy) Alessandro Giannessi

=== Withdrawals ===
Before the tournament

- (Ukraine) Alexandr Dolgopolov → replaced by (Norway) Casper Ruud
- (Argentina) Nicolás Kicker → replaced by (Canada) Peter Polansky
- (Spain) Tommy Robredo → replaced by (Italy) Alessandro Giannessi
- (United States) Tennys Sandgren → replaced by (Italy) Stefano Travaglia

== Doubles main draw entrants ==
=== Seeds ===
Country	Player	Country	Player	Rank^{1}	Seed
BRA	Marcelo Demoliner	IND	Purav Raja	98	1
PHI	Treat Huey	AUT	Philipp Oswald	111	2
MEX	Santiago González	MEX	Miguel Ángel Reyes Varela	127	3
ESP	Pablo Carreño Busta	ARG	Guillermo Durán	148	4

- ^{1} Rankings are as of January 29, 2018.

=== Other entrants ===
The following pairs received wildcards into the doubles main draw:

- (France) Dorian Descloix / (France) Gaël Monfils
- (Ecuador) Gonzalo Escobar / (Ecuador) Roberto Quiroz

The following pairs received entry as alternates:

- (Argentina) Facundo Bagnis / (Brazil) João Souza
- (Italy) Federico Gaio / (Slovakia) Andrej Martin
- (Peru) Sergio Galdós / (Austria) Gerald Melzer

=== Withdrawals ===
Before the tournament

- (Argentina) Carlos Berlocq (right shoulder injury)
- (Brazil) Rogério Dutra Silva (enteritis)
- (Brazil) André Sá (right calf strain)

== Finals ==
=== Singles ===
- (Spain) Roberto Carballés Baena defeated (Spain) Albert Ramos Viñolas, 6–3, 4–6, 6–4

=== Doubles ===
- (Chile) Nicolás Jarry / (Chile) Hans Podlipnik-Castillo defeated (United States) Austin Krajicek / (United States) Jackson Withrow, 7–6^{(8–6)}, 6–3
