= 2015 Ecuador Open Quito – Doubles =

Doubles
- 2015 Ecuador Open Quito

Final
- Champions: (Germany) Gero Kretschmer (Germany) Alexander Satschko
- Runners-up: (Dominican Republic) Víctor Estrella Burgos (Brazil) João Souza
- Score: 7–5, 7–6^{(7–3)}

Details
- Draw: 16
- Seeds: 4

Events
Singles	Doubles
Ecuador Open Quito	· 2016 →

This was the first edition of the tournament. Gero Kretschmer and Alexander Satschko won the title, defeating Víctor Estrella Burgos and João Souza in the final, 7–5, 7–6^{(7–3)}.

== Seeds ==
1. (Philippines) Treat Huey / (United States) Scott Lipsky (semifinals)
2. (Spain) Feliciano López / (Austria) Oliver Marach (semifinals)
3. (Sweden) Johan Brunström / (United States) Nicholas Monroe (first round)
4. (Brazil) Marcelo Demoliner / (United States) Austin Krajicek (first round)

== Draw ==
=== Key ===
- Q = Qualifier
- WC = Wild card
- LL = Lucky loser
- Alt = Alternate
- SE = Special exempt
- PR = Protected ranking
- ITF = ITF entry
- JE = Junior exempt
- w/o = Walkover
- r = Retired
- d = Defaulted
- SR = Special ranking

=== Draw ===
First round
1	(Philippines) T Huey (United States) S Lipsky	7^{7}	7^{13}
(Serbia) D Lajović (Argentina) H Zeballos	6^{5}	6^{11}
WC	(Chile) N Jarry (Ecuador) G Lapentti	6	6^{5}	[5]
(Spain) R Carballés Baena (Spain) A Montañés	0	7^{7}	[10]
3	(Sweden) J Brunström (United States) N Monroe	4	6	[7]
(Colombia) A Falla (Colombia) A González	6	4	[10]
(Dominican Republic) V Estrella Burgos (Brazil) J Souza	6	6
(Austria) A Haider-Maurer (Italy) P Lorenzi	2	4
Alt	(Germany) G Kretschmer (Germany) A Satschko	6	6
WC	(Spain) S Pérez-Pérez (Spain) F Verdasco	3	4
(Spain) D Gimeno-Traver (Spain) A Menéndez-Maceiras	7^{7}	6
4	(Brazil) M Demoliner (United States) A Krajicek	6^{3}	0
(Mexico) C Ramírez (Mexico) MÁ Reyes-Varela	7^{7}	6
(Venezuela) R Maytín (Colombia) JC Spir	6^{5}	3
(Colombia) N Barrientos (Argentina) G Durán	3	1
2	(Spain) F López (Austria) O Marach	6	6

Quarterfinals
1	(Philippines) T Huey (United States) S Lipsky	7^{7}	7^{7}
(Spain) R Carballés Baena (Spain) A Montañés	6^{3}	6^{4}
(Colombia) A Falla (Colombia) A González	7	2	[4]
(Dominican Republic) V Estrella Burgos (Brazil) J Souza	5	6	[10]
Alt	(Germany) G Kretschmer (Germany) A Satschko	6	6
(Spain) D Gimeno-Traver (Spain) A Menéndez-Maceiras	3	3
(Mexico) C Ramírez (Mexico) MÁ Reyes-Varela	6	5	[4]
2	(Spain) F López (Austria) O Marach	4	7	[10]

Semifinals
1	(Philippines) T Huey (United States) S Lipsky	6^{3}	6^{2}
(Dominican Republic) V Estrella Burgos (Brazil) J Souza	7^{7}	7^{7}
Alt	(Germany) G Kretschmer (Germany) A Satschko	7^{7}	6^{3}	[10]
2	(Spain) F López (Austria) O Marach	6^{2}	7^{7}	[5]

Final
(Dominican Republic) V Estrella Burgos (Brazil) J Souza	5	6^{3}
Alt	(Germany) G Kretschmer (Germany) A Satschko	7	7^{7}
