= 2016 Ecuador Open Quito – Singles =

Singles
- 2016 Ecuador Open Quito

Final
- Champion: (Dominican Republic) Víctor Estrella Burgos
- Runner-up: (Brazil) Thomaz Bellucci
- Score: 4–6, 7–6^{(7–5)}, 6–2

Details
- Draw: 28
- Seeds: 8

Events
Singles	Doubles
- Ecuador Open Quito

Víctor Estrella Burgos was the defending champion and successfully defended his title, defeating Thomaz Bellucci in the final, 4–6, 7–6^{(7–5)}, 6–2.

== Seeds ==
The top four seeds receive a bye into the second round.

1. (Australia) Bernard Tomic (quarterfinals)
2. (Spain) Feliciano López (quarterfinals, retired)
3. (Brazil) Thomaz Bellucci (final)
4. (Spain) Fernando Verdasco (second round)
5. (Dominican Republic) Víctor Estrella Burgos (champion)
6. (Italy) Paolo Lorenzi (semifinals)
7. (Spain) Albert Ramos Viñolas (semifinals)
8. (Spain) Pablo Carreño Busta (quarterfinals)

== Draw ==
Key

- Q = Qualifier
- WC = Wild card
- LL = Lucky loser
- Alt = Alternate
- ITF = ITF entry
- PR = Protected ranking
- SR = Special ranking
- SE = Special exempt
- JE = Junior exempt
- JR = Junior Accelerator Programme entrant
- CO = College Accelerator Programme entrant
- NG = Next Gen Accelerator Program entrant
- w/o = Walkover
- r = Retired
- d = Defaulted

=== Finals ===
Semifinals
6	(Italy) Paolo Lorenzi	6	2	3
3	(Brazil) Thomaz Bellucci	3	6	6
5	(Dominican Republic) Víctor Estrella Burgos	6	7^{7}
7	(Spain) Albert Ramos Viñolas	2	6^{5}

Final
3	(Brazil) Thomaz Bellucci	6	6^{5}	2
5	(Dominican Republic) Víctor Estrella Burgos	4	7^{7}	6

=== Top half ===
First round
(United States) A Krajicek	4	3
(Spain) R Carballés Baena	6	6
(Colombia) A Falla	6	6
WC	(Ecuador) G Lapentti	2	3
WC	(Ecuador) G Escobar	1	2
6	(Italy) P Lorenzi	6	6
(Spain) A Montañés	6	3	6
Q	(Slovakia) J Kovalík	3	6	4
PR	(Spain) P Riba	7^{8}	4	3
(Spain) I Cervantes	6^{6}	6	6
(Brazil) R Dutra Silva	3	1
8	(Spain) P Carreño Busta	6	6

Second round
1	(Australia) B Tomic	6	2	6
(Spain) R Carballés Baena	3	6	4
(Colombia) A Falla	3	2
6	(Italy) P Lorenzi	6	6
3	(Brazil) T Bellucci	6	6
(Spain) A Montañés	2	4
(Spain) I Cervantes	7^{7}	6^{2}	2
8	(Spain) P Carreño Busta	6^{5}	7^{7}	6

Quarterfinals
1	(Australia) B Tomic	7^{7}	5	3
6	(Italy) P Lorenzi	6^{5}	7	6
3	(Brazil) T Bellucci	7^{7}	4	6
8	(Spain) P Carreño Busta	6^{0}	6	2

Semifinals
6	(Italy) P Lorenzi	6	2	3
3	(Brazil) T Bellucci	3	6	6

=== Bottom half ===
First round
5	(Dominican Republic) V Estrella Burgos	6	6
(Argentina) G Pella	4	4
(Spain) M Granollers	6^{7}	2
Q	(Slovakia) A Martin	7^{9}	6
WC	(Colombia) A González	7^{7}	3	3
Q	(Argentina) R Olivo	6^{1}	6	6
7	(Spain) A Ramos Viñolas	6	7^{9}
(Serbia) D Lajović	4	6^{7}
(Argentina) H Zeballos	4	6^{6}
(United States) R Ram	6	7^{8}
(Argentina) F Argüello	3	6^{7}
Q	(Brazil) J Souza	6	7^{9}

Second round
5	(Dominican Republic) V Estrella Burgos	7	6
Q	(Slovakia) A Martin	5	1
Q	(Argentina) R Olivo	7^{7}	3	6
4	(Spain) F Verdasco	6^{5}	6	3
7	(Spain) A Ramos Viñolas	6^{5}	6	7
(United States) R Ram	7^{7}	3	5
Q	(Brazil) J Souza	6	6^{5}	2
2	(Spain) F López	4	7^{7}	6

Quarterfinals
5	(Dominican Republic) V Estrella Burgos	6	6^{5}	6
Q	(Argentina) R Olivo	4	7^{7}	4
7	(Spain) A Ramos Viñolas	7	4
2	(Spain) F López	5	3^{r}

Semifinals
5	(Dominican Republic) V Estrella Burgos	6	7^{7}
7	(Spain) A Ramos Viñolas	2	6^{5}

== Qualifying ==
=== Seeds ===
1. (Slovakia) Andrej Martin (qualified)
2. (Brazil) João Souza (qualified)
3. (Argentina) Renzo Olivo (qualified)
4. (Croatia) Franko Škugor (first round)
5. (Chile) Hans Podlipnik Castillo (first round)
6. (Spain) Jordi Samper Montaña (first round)
7. (France) Calvin Hemery (qualifying competition)
8. (Sweden) Christian Lindell (first round)

=== Qualifiers ===
1. (Slovakia) Andrej Martin
2. (Brazil) João Souza
3. (Argentina) Renzo Olivo
4. (Slovakia) Jozef Kovalík

=== Qualifying draw ===
==== First qualifier ====
First round
1	(Slovakia) Andrej Martin	7	6
Alt	(Ecuador) Emilio Gómez	5	4
(Austria) Bastian Trinker	4	4
7	(France) Calvin Hemery	6	6

Qualifying competition
1	(Slovakia) Andrej Martin	2	6	7
7	(France) Calvin Hemery	6	2	5

==== Second qualifier ====
First round
2	(Brazil) João Souza	6	6
WC	(Ecuador) Iván Endara	3	4
WC	(Ecuador) Roberto Quiroz	6	6
8	(Sweden) Christian Lindell	4	4

Qualifying competition
2	(Brazil) João Souza	6	6
WC	(Ecuador) Roberto Quiroz	4	3

==== Third qualifier ====
First round
3	(Argentina) Renzo Olivo	6	6
(France) Jonathan Eysseric	3	1
Alt	(Argentina) Juan Ignacio Londero	6	7
5	(Chile) Hans Podlipnik Castillo	4	5

Qualifying competition
3	(Argentina) Renzo Olivo	6	7
Alt	(Argentina) Juan Ignacio Londero	3	5

==== Fourth qualifier ====
First round
4	(Croatia) Franko Škugor	4	6	4
(Slovakia) Jozef Kovalík	6	3	6
Alt	(Colombia) Eduardo Struvay	6	6
6	(Spain) Jordi Samper Montaña	3	4

Qualifying competition
(Slovakia) Jozef Kovalík	7^{7}	6
Alt	(Colombia) Eduardo Struvay	6^{2}	4
