= 2018 Ecuador Open Quito – Singles =

Singles
- 2018 Ecuador Open Quito

Final
- Champion: (Spain) Roberto Carballés Baena
- Runner-up: (Spain) Albert Ramos Viñolas
- Score: 6–3, 4–6, 6–4

Details
- Draw: 28 (4 Q / 3 WC )
- Seeds: 8

Events
Singles	Doubles
- Ecuador Open Quito

Víctor Estrella Burgos was the three-time defending champion and the tournament's only champion to date, but lost in the second round to Gerald Melzer.

Roberto Carballés Baena won his first ATP title, defeating Albert Ramos Viñolas in the final, 6–3, 4–6, 6–4.

== Seeds ==
The top four seeds receive a bye into the second round.

1. (Spain) Pablo Carreño Busta (second round)
2. (Spain) Albert Ramos Viñolas (final)
3. (France) Gaël Monfils (quarterfinals)
4. (Italy) Paolo Lorenzi (second round)
5. (Argentina) Horacio Zeballos (first round)
6. (Dominican Republic) Víctor Estrella Burgos (second round)
7. (Croatia) Ivo Karlović (second round)
8. (Chile) Nicolás Jarry (quarterfinals)

== Draw ==
Key

- Q = Qualifier
- WC = Wild card
- LL = Lucky loser
- Alt = Alternate
- ITF = ITF entry
- PR = Protected ranking
- SR = Special ranking
- SE = Special exempt
- JE = Junior exempt
- JR = Junior Accelerator Programme entrant
- CO = College Accelerator Programme entrant
- NG = Next Gen Accelerator Program entrant
- w/o = Walkover
- r = Retired
- d = Defaulted

=== Finals ===
Semifinals
Q	(Slovakia) Andrej Martin	6	3	2
Q	(Spain) Roberto Carballés Baena	4	6	6
(Brazil) Thiago Monteiro	4	7^{7}	4
2	(Spain) Albert Ramos Viñolas	6	6^{4}	6

Final
Q	(Spain) Roberto Carballés Baena	6	4	6
2	(Spain) Albert Ramos Viñolas	3	6	4

=== Top half ===
First round
(Brazil) R Dutra Silva	5	4
Q	(Slovakia) A Martin	7	6
WC	(France) C Moutet	6	6^{5}	6
(Spain) A Menéndez Maceiras	4	7^{7}	2
(United States) E Escobedo	4	7^{8}	6^{4}
7	(Croatia) I Karlović	6	6^{6}	7^{7}
Q	(Spain) R Carballés Baena	7^{7}	6
Q	(Italy) F Gaio	6^{5}	3
PR	(Spain) P Andújar	4	7	5
(Italy) S Travaglia	6	5	7
Q	(Argentina) F Bagnis	7^{7}	2	6^{5}
8	(Chile) N Jarry	6^{4}	6	7^{7}

Second round
1	(Spain) P Carreño Busta	4	2
Q	(Slovakia) A Martin	6	6
WC	(France) C Moutet	7	6^{3}	7^{8}
7	(Croatia) I Karlović	5	7^{7}	6^{6}
4	(Italy) P Lorenzi	6^{4}	5
Q	(Spain) R Carballés Baena	7^{7}	7
(Italy) S Travaglia	6	6^{5}	3
8	(Chile) N Jarry	4	7^{7}	6

Quarterfinals
Q	(Slovakia) A Martin	6	6
WC	(France) C Moutet	3	4
Q	(Spain) R Carballés Baena	3	6	7^{7}
8	(Chile) N Jarry	6	2	6^{5}

Semifinals
Q	(Slovakia) A Martin	6	3	2
Q	(Spain) R Carballés Baena	4	6	6

=== Bottom half ===
First round
5	(Argentina) H Zeballos	4	6^{8}
(Brazil) T Monteiro	6	7^{10}
LL	(Italy) A Giannessi	6	6
(Canada) P Polansky	3	4
(Norway) C Ruud	7	6
(Argentina) C Berlocq	5	0
6	(Dominican Republic) V Estrella Burgos	4	6	6
(Brazil) T Bellucci	6	4	2
(Austria) G Melzer	6	6
(Italy) M Cecchinato	4	2
(Germany) Y Hanfmann	6^{5}	3
WC	(Ecuador) R Quiroz	7^{7}	6

Second round
(Brazil) T Monteiro	7^{7}	4	7
LL	(Italy) A Giannessi	6^{4}	6	5
(Norway) C Ruud	4	6	4
3	(France) G Monfils	6	3	6
6	(Dominican Republic) V Estrella Burgos	6	1	4
(Austria) G Melzer	4	6	6
WC	(Ecuador) R Quiroz	3	6	3
2	(Spain) A Ramos Viñolas	6	3	6

Quarterfinals
(Brazil) T Monteiro	6	2	6
3	(France) G Monfils	4	6	4
(Austria) G Melzer	2	4
2	(Spain) A Ramos Viñolas	6	6

Semifinals
(Brazil) T Monteiro	4	7^{7}	4
2	(Spain) A Ramos Viñolas	6	6^{4}	6

== Qualifying ==
=== Seeds ===
The top two seeds receive a bye into the qualifying competition.

1. (Spain) Roberto Carballés Baena (qualified)
2. (Slovakia) Andrej Martin (qualified)
3. (Italy) Alessandro Giannessi (qualifying competition, lucky loser)
4. (Argentina) Facundo Bagnis (qualified)
5. (Brazil) Guilherme Clezar (first round)
6. (Brazil) João Souza (qualifying competition)
7. (Italy) Federico Gaio (qualified)
8. (Spain) Daniel Muñoz de la Nava (first round)

=== Qualifiers ===
1. (Spain) Roberto Carballés Baena
2. (Slovakia) Andrej Martin
3. (Italy) Federico Gaio
4. (Argentina) Facundo Bagnis

=== Lucky loser ===
1. (Italy) Alessandro Giannessi

=== Qualifying draw ===
==== First qualifier ====
First round					Qualifying competition
					1	(Spain) Roberto Carballés Baena	6	6
						(Ecuador) Gonzalo Escobar	1	3
	(Ecuador) Gonzalo Escobar	6^{3}	7^{7}	6		(Ecuador) Gonzalo Escobar	1	3
5	(Brazil) Guilherme Clezar	7^{7}	6^{5}	4

==== Second qualifier ====
First round					Qualifying competition
					2	(Slovakia) Andrej Martin	6	6
						(Brazil) Pedro Sakamoto	4	4
	(Brazil) Pedro Sakamoto	3	6	6		(Brazil) Pedro Sakamoto	4	4
8	(Spain) Daniel Muñoz de la Nava	6	4	4

==== Third qualifier ====
First round
3	(Italy) Alessandro Giannessi	6	6
(Argentina) Juan Ignacio Londero	4	4
(Brazil) Daniel Dutra da Silva	4	7^{7}	3
7	(Italy) Federico Gaio	6	6^{5}	6

Qualifying competition
3	(Italy) Alessandro Giannessi	6	6^{5}	6^{7}
7	(Italy) Federico Gaio	3	7^{7}	7^{9}

==== Fourth qualifier ====
First round
4	(Argentina) Facundo Bagnis	6	6
Alt	(Italy) Alessandro Motti	0	3
Alt	(Czech Republic) Jan Hernych	3	3
6	(Brazil) João Souza	6	6

Qualifying competition
4	(Argentina) Facundo Bagnis	6	6
6	(Brazil) João Souza	3	4
