= Julio Peralta =

Chilean tennis player (born 1981)

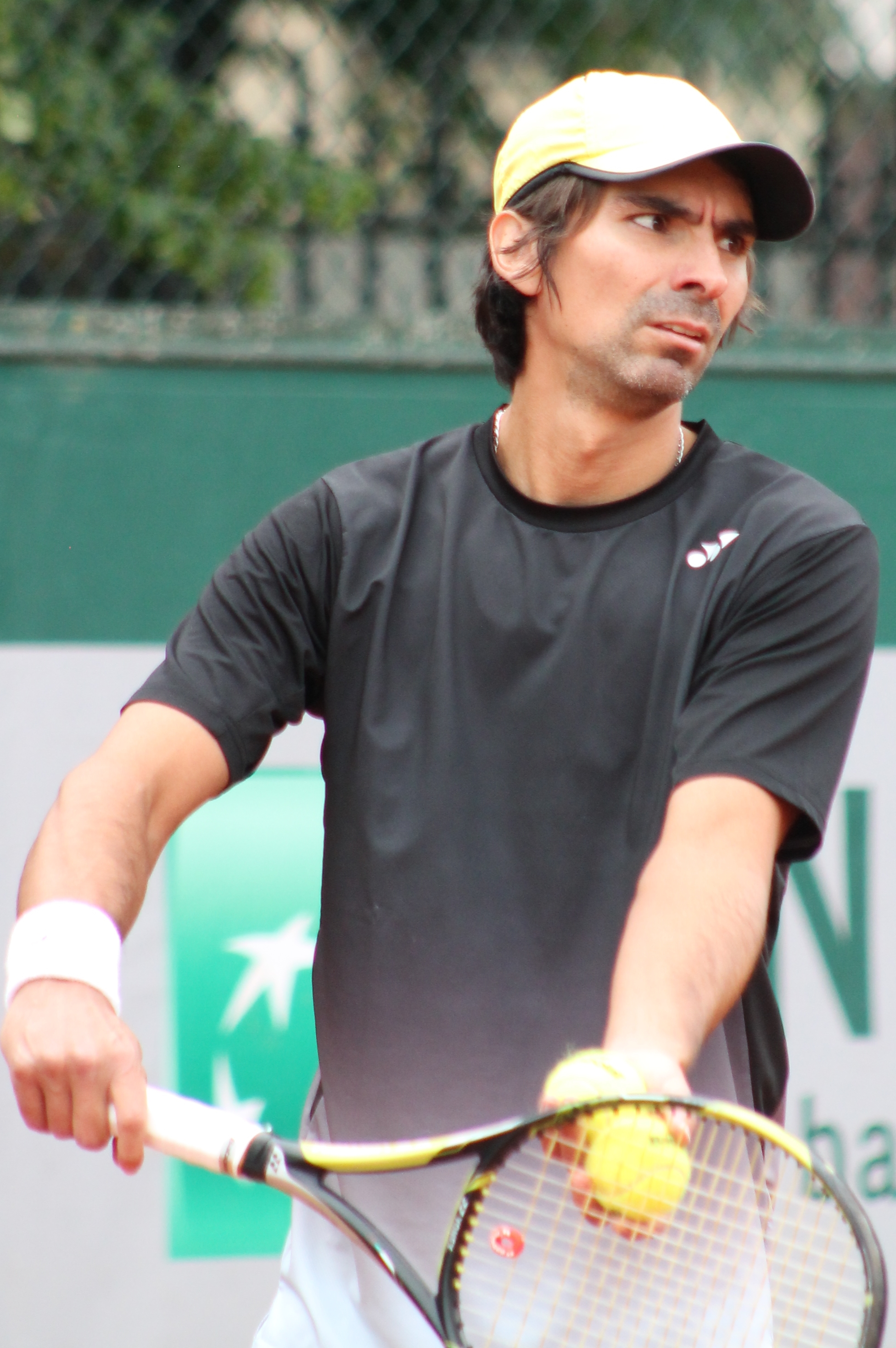
- Peralta in 2016
- Country (sports): Chile
- Residence: Santiago, Chile; Miami, United States
- Born: 9 September 1981 (age 44) Brasília, Brazil
- Height: 1.88 m (6 ft 2 in)
- Turned pro: 2000
- Plays: Right-handed (one-handed backhand)
- Prize money: US$ 700,691

Singles
- Career record: 0–1 (at ATP Tour level, Grand Slam level, and in Davis Cup)
- Career titles: 0
- Highest ranking: No. 212 (December 1, 2023)

Doubles
- Career record: 79–58 (at ATP Tour level, Grand Slam level, and in Davis Cup)
- Career titles: 6
- Highest ranking: No. 29 (16 October 2017)
- Current ranking: No. 553 (27 February 2023)

Grand Slam doubles results
- Australian Open: 1R (2017, 2018)
- French Open: QF (2017)
- Wimbledon: 2R (2017, 2018)
- US Open: 2R (2017, 2018)
- Last updated on: 27 February 2023.

Julio Leonardo Peralta Martínez (Spanish pronunciation: [ˈxuljo leoˈnaɾðo peˈɾalta maɾˈtines]; born 9 September 1981) is an inactive professional tennis player from Chile. Peralta has found success in the late stage of his career, reaching no. 29 in the ATP rankings in doubles. He captured six doubles titles at ATP World Tour and one singles challenger title. He went on hiatus from 2005 to 2007, from 2009 to 2011, from 2012 to 2014 and from 2018 to 2022.

== Career ==
=== 2000–2004 ===
Peralta turned pro in 2000, and had his best year in his singles career in 2003, year which he won a challenger tournament, the BH Tennis Open International Cup in Belo Horizonte. He retired in 2005.

=== 2007–2008 ===
He made a comeback in 2007 at ITF Futures tournaments. Julio competed throughout 2008, but he suffered an injury the next year.

=== 2011: Second comeback ===
He made his comeback (after long, exhausting, two-year injury) in the 2011 Sparkassen Open, winning comfortably the first two qualifying rounds, against Stefan Seifert and David Goffin (no. 220). In the main tournament, he defeated Victor Crivoi.

=== 2014: Third comeback ===
After a long hiatus, he returned in September at the 2014 Napa Valley Challenger doubles tournament partnering Matt Seeberger as a wildcard pair.

In early November, he won the titles in both singles and doubles USA F30 tournament, not dropping a single set in the main draw in both tournaments. In Chile F9 tournament he made the singles final, losing to Hans Podlipnik Castillo and the following week won the doubles tournament in Chile F10 partnering Seeberger.

=== 2015: New partnership and Challenger Tour success ===
Peralta played many Challenger Tour tournaments during the year, reaching seven finals and winning four, partnering Horacio Zeballos in three of these titles. With the victories, Peralta rose almost 400 positions in the rankings, ending the year at No. 105.

=== 2016: Three ATP Doubles titles ===
He broke through onto the ATP World Tour doubles circuit in 2016, winning the Brazil Open, the Swiss Open and the Moselle Open with Horacio Zeballos. He won his first match in a Grand Slam at the French Open, partnering Denis Kudla, but the duo lost in the second round. Peralta also won six challenger tournaments, partnering Zeballos in four, in one with Dennis Novikov, and at Santiago with countryman Hans Podlipnik. Peralta tied with Matt Reid and John-Patrick Smith for most Challenger titles in doubles for the year. Peralta finished the year ranked No. 44 in the world in doubles, and the highest ranked Chilean player in singles or doubles, record he has held since then.

=== 2017: Another title, French Open quarterfinals, top 30 debut ===
Peralta and Zeballos reached the final of the Ecuador Open, but lost to James Cerretani and Philipp Oswald. They went on to win the U.S. Men's Clay Court Championships. At the French Open, he partnered Zeballos to reach the quarterfinals. This saw his ranking jump to a career high of No. 35.

In the rest of the year, Peralta reached two more tournament finals with Zeballos, and another one with Santiago González, with whom he reached quarterfinals at the 2017 Shanghai Rolex Masters too.

Peralta ended the year at World No. 29, his best position yet.

=== 2018: First ATP 500 & one more titles ===
Peralta had a slow beginning of the year, with semifinals at 2018 ASB Classic as the only notable result. Julio and Horacio Zeballos reunited for attempting a defense of their title in the U.S. Men's Clay Court Championships, but they lost in first round. They also tried to imitate their past year quarterfinals run on the French Open, but they lost in second round. Partnering with Roman Jebavý, they reached semifinals of the 2018 Antalya Open.

Peralta and Zeballos partnered again for the 2018 Wimbledon and won over 16th seeds Max Mirnyi and Philipp Oswald in first round, but then lost in second round. The partnership went on and they won the 2018 Swedish Open, defeating in the final the Italian pair Simone Bolelli and Fabio Fognini. The following week Peralta and Zeballos won another title, the 2018 German Open, his first on the ATP 500 level, defeating Oliver Marach and Mate Pavić in the final.

=== 2022: Back on the ATP tour ===
After almost 4 years of hiatus, Peralta came back on the ATP tour in April where he entered the 2022 BMW Open with Franko Škugor with a protected ranking and next at the Italian Open as an alternate pair also with Škugor where they won their first round match against top 50 players Tomislav Brkić and Nikola Ćaćić.

== Personal life ==
Peralta was born in Brasília, Brazil, and began to play tennis in Paramaribo, Suriname, where his father worked as a dentist.

A close friend of Fernando González, he performed as his double in an advert of Powerade.

== ATP career finals ==
=== Doubles: 10 (6 titles, 4 runner-ups) ===
Legend Grand Slam tournaments (0–0) ATP World Tour Finals (0–0) ATP World Tour Masters 1000 (0–0) ATP World Tour 500 Series (1–0) ATP World Tour 250 Series (5–4)	Titles by surface Hard (1–3) Clay (5–1) Grass (0–0)	Titles by setting Outdoor (5–2) Indoor (1–2)

Result	W–L	Date	Tournament	Tier	Surface	Partner	Opponents	Score
Win	1–0	Feb 2016	Brasil Open, Brazil	250 Series	Clay	(Argentina) Horacio Zeballos	(Spain) Pablo Carreño Busta (Spain) David Marrero	4–6, 6–1, [10–5]
Win	2–0	Jul 2016	Swiss Open, Switzerland	250 Series	Clay	(Argentina) Horacio Zeballos	(Croatia) Mate Pavić (New Zealand) Michael Venus	7–6^{(7–2)}, 6–2
Win	3–0	Sep 2016	Moselle Open, France	250 Series	Hard (i)	(Argentina) Horacio Zeballos	(Croatia) Mate Pavić (New Zealand) Michael Venus	6–3, 7–6^{(7–4)}
Loss	3–1	Feb 2017	Ecuador Open, Ecuador	250 Series	Clay	(Argentina) Horacio Zeballos	(United States) James Cerretani (Austria) Philipp Oswald	3−6, 1−2 ret.
Win	4–1	Apr 2017	U.S. Men's Clay Court Championships, US	250 Series	Clay	(Argentina) Horacio Zeballos	(Germany) Dustin Brown (United States) Frances Tiafoe	4–6, 7–5, [10–6]
Loss	4–2	Aug 2017	Winston-Salem Open, US	250 Series	Hard	(Argentina) Horacio Zeballos	(Netherlands) Jean-Julien Rojer (Romania) Horia Tecău	3−6, 4−6
Loss	4–3	Sep 2017	St. Petersburg Open, Russia	250 Series	Hard (i)	(Argentina) Horacio Zeballos	(Czech Republic) Roman Jebavý (Netherlands) Matwé Middelkoop	4–6, 4–6
Loss	4–4	Oct 2017	European Open, Belgium	250 Series	Hard (i)	(Mexico) Santiago González	(United States) Scott Lipsky (India) Divij Sharan	4–6, 6–2, [5–10]
Win	5–4	Jul 2018	Swedish Open, Sweden	250 Series	Clay	(Argentina) Horacio Zeballos	(Italy) Simone Bolelli (Italy) Fabio Fognini	6–3, 6–4
Win	6–4	Jul 2018	German Open, Germany	500 Series	Clay	(Argentina) Horacio Zeballos	(Austria) Oliver Marach (Croatia) Mate Pavić	6–1, 4–6, [10–6]

== ATP Challenger & ITF Futures finals ==
=== Singles (8–6) ===
Legend
ATP Challenger Series (1–0)
ITF Futures Series (7–6)

Result	No.	Date	Tournament	Surface	Opponent	Score
Loss	1.	28 August 2000	Peru F1, Peru	Clay	(Brazil) Júlio Silva	6–7^{(4–7)}, 6–3, 3–6
Loss	2.	4 December 2000	Chile F9, Chile	Clay	(Argentina) Patricio Rudi	6–3, 6–7^{(2–7)}, 0–6
Loss	3.	16 July 2001	Romania F3, Romania	Clay	(Romania) Gabriel Moraru	6–7^{(6–8)}, 6–7^{(3–7)}
Win	1.	3 September 2001	Peru F2, Peru	Clay	(Venezuela) Yohny Romero	6–3, 6–3
Win	2.	24 September 2001	Bolivia F2, Bolivia	Clay	(Chile) Phillip Harboe	6–3, 6–4
Loss	4.	8 October 2001	Paraguay F1, Paraguay	Clay	(Argentina) Sebastián Decoud	3–6, 1–6
Win	3.	14 April 2003	Chile F3, Chile	Clay	(Chile) Phillip Harboe	4–6, 6–4, 6–2
Win	4.	28 July 2003	Belo Horizonte, Brazil	Hard	(Thailand) Danai Udomchoke	7–6^{(8–6)}, 1–6, 6–1
Win	5.	2 August 2004	Chile F1-A, Chile	Clay	(Argentina) Damián Patriarca	6–2, 6–1
Loss	5.	9 August 2004	Chile F1-B, Chile	Clay	(Argentina) Cristian Villagrán	4–6, 4–6
Win	6.	27 October 2008	Chile F4, Chile	Clay	(Chile) Jorge Aguilar	6–4, 6–2
Win	7.	3 November 2008	Chile F5, Chile	Clay	(Argentina) Bruno Tiberti	6–0, 6–2
Win	8.	4 November 2014	USA F5, United States	Clay	(United States) Jean-Yves Aubone	6–2, 6–1
Loss	6.	1 December 2014	Chile F9, Chile	Clay	(Chile) Hans Podlipnik Castillo	2–6, 3–6

=== Doubles (18–10) ===
Legend
ATP Challenger Series (10–6)
ITF Futures Series (8–4)

Result	No.	Date	Tournament	Surface	Partner	Opponents	Score
Loss	1.	1 October 2001	Bolivia F3, Bolivia	Clay	(Chile) Felipe Parada	(Argentina) Federico Cardinali (Chile) Sergio Elias	7–5, 2–6, 3–6
Loss	2.	22 April 2002	Jamaica F3, Jamaica	Hard	(Venezuela) Kepler Orellana	(United States) Diego Ayala (Australia) Adam Kennedy	5–7, 6–3, 3–6
Loss	3.	20 January 2003	USA F2, USA	Hard	(Chile) Felipe Parada	(Argentina) Ignacio Hirigoyen (United States) Tripp Phillips	4–6, 2–6
Loss	4.	27 January 2003	USA F3, USA	Hard	(Chile) Felipe Parada	(United States) Ryan Sachire (United States) Tripp Phillips	w/o
Win	1.	27 October 2008	Chile F4, Chile	Clay	(Switzerland) Mathieu Guenat	(Chile) Cristóbal Saavedra Corvalán (Chile) Ángel Torres	6–2, 6–2
Win	2.	3 November 2014	USA F30, USA	Clay	(United States) Matt Seeberger	(Romania) Cătălin-Ionuț Gârd (United States) Alex Rybakov	6–3, 6–4
Win	3.	8 December 2014	Chile F10, Chile	Clay	(Switzerland) Mathieu Guenat	(Uruguay) Martín Cuevas (Brazil) Gustavo Guerses	6–2, 6–3
Win	4.	15 December 2014	Chile F11, Chile	Clay	(Chile) Ricardo Urzúa-Rivera	(Argentina) Nicolás Arreche (Argentina) Tomás Lipovšek Puches	7–5, 6–0
Win	5.	22 December 2014	Chile F12, Chile	Clay	(Chile) Hans Podlipnik	(Uruguay) Ariel Behar (Chile) Gonzalo Lama	7–6^{(7–3)}, 6–2
Win	6.	23 February 2015	Panama F1, Panama	Clay	(Barbados) Darian King	(Ecuador) Iván Endara (Argentina) Eduardo Agustín Torre	w/o
Win	7.	2 March 2015	Nicaragua F1, Nicaragua	Clay	(Colombia) Juan Sebastián Gómez	(South Africa) Keith-Patrick Crowley (Mexico) Hans Hach Verdugo	6–3, 6–3
Loss	5.	20 April 2015	Savannah, United States	Clay	(United States) Dennis Novikov	(Argentina) Guillermo Durán (Argentina) Horacio Zeballos	4–6, 3–6
Win	8.	27 April 2015	Tallahassee, United States	Clay	(United States) Dennis Novikov	(India) Somdev Devvarman (India) Sanam Singh	6–2, 6–4
Win	9.	1 June 2015	USA F16-A, USA	Hard	(United States) Matt Seeberger	(United States) Tennys Sandgren (United States) Rhyne Williams	3–6, 6–3, [10–8]
Loss	6.	8 June 2015	Moscow, Russia	Clay	(United States) Matt Seeberger	(Argentina) Renzo Olivo (Argentina) Horacio Zeballos	5–7, 3–6
Loss	7.	13 July 2015	Poznań, Poland	Clay	(United States) Matt Seeberger	(Russia) Mikhail Elgin (Poland) Mateusz Kowalczyk	6–3, 3–6, [6–10]
Win	10.	12 October 2015	Corrientes, Argentina	Clay	(Argentina) Horacio Zeballos	(Argentina) Guillermo Durán (Argentina) Máximo González	6–2, 6–3
Win	11.	2 November 2015	Bogotá, Colombia	Clay	(Argentina) Horacio Zeballos	(Colombia) Nicolás Barrientos (Colombia) Eduardo Struvay	6–3, 6–4
Win	12.	9 November 2015	Buenos Aires, Argentina	Clay	(Argentina) Horacio Zeballos	(Argentina) Lucas Arnold Ker (Argentina) Guido Andreozzi	6–2, 7–5
Loss	8.	4 January 2016	Mendoza, Argentina	Clay	(Argentina) Horacio Zeballos	(Argentina) Máximo González (Dominican Republic) José Hernández-Fernández	6–4, 3–6, [1–10]
Win	13.	25 January 2016	Bucaramanga, Colombia	Clay	(Argentina) Horacio Zeballos	(Peru) Sergio Galdós (Venezuela) Luis David Martínez	6–2, 6–2
Win	14.	7 March 2016	Santiago, Chile	Clay	(Chile) Hans Podlipnik	(Argentina) Facundo Bagnis (Argentina) Máximo González	7–6^{(7–4)}, 4–6, [10–5]
Win	15.	25 April 2016	Tallahassee, United States	Clay	(United States) Dennis Novikov	(Australia) Peter Luczak (Australia) Marc Polmans	3–6, 6–4, [12–10]
Loss	9.	30 May 2016	Prostějov, Czech Republic	Clay	(Chile) Hans Podlipnik	(Belarus) Aliaksandr Bury (Slovakia) Igor Zelenay	4–6, 4–6
Loss	10.	25 July 2016	Prague, Czech Republic	Clay	(Argentina) Facundo Argüello	(Austria) Julian Knowle (Slovakia) Igor Zelenay	4–6, 5–7
Win	16.	25 July 2016	Genova, Italy	Clay	(Argentina) Horacio Zeballos	(Belarus) Aliaksandr Bury (Belarus) Andrei Vasilevski	6–4, 6–3
Win	17.	10 October 2016	Buenos Aires, Argentina	Clay	(Argentina) Horacio Zeballos	(Peru) Sergio Galdós (Brazil) Fernando Romboli	7–6^{(7–5)}, 7–6^{(7–1)}
Win	18.	17 October 2016	Santiago, Chile	Clay	(Argentina) Horacio Zeballos	(Argentina) Máximo González (Peru) Sergio Galdós	6–3, 6–4

== Doubles performance timeline ==
Key
W	F	SF	QF	#R	RR	Q#	DNQ	A	NH

(W) winner; (F) finalist; (SF) semifinalist; (QF) quarterfinalist; (#R) rounds 4, 3, 2, 1; (RR) round-robin stage; (Q#) qualification round; (DNQ) did not qualify; (A) absent; (NH) not held; (SR) strike rate (events won / competed); (W–L) win–loss record.
To avoid confusion and double counting, these charts are updated at the conclusion of a tournament or when the player's participation has ended.

Tournament	2015	2016	2017	2018	2019–2021	2022	W–L
Grand Slam tournaments
Australian Open	A	A	1R	1R	A	A	0–2
French Open	A	2R	QF	2R	A	A	5–3
Wimbledon	A	1R	2R	2R	A	1R	2–4
US Open	1R	1R	2R	2R	A	A	2–4
Win–loss	0–1	1–3	5–4	3–4	0–0	0–1	9–13
ATP World Tour Masters 1000
Indian Wells Masters	A	A	A	1R	A	A	0–1
Miami Open	A	A	A	A	A	A	0–0
Monte-Carlo Masters	A	A	A	A	A	A	0–0
Madrid Open	A	A	A	A	A	A	0–0
Italian Open	A	A	A	1R	A	2R	1–1
Canadian Open	A	A	A	A	A	A	0–0
Cincinnati Masters	A	A	A	A	A	A	0–0
Shanghai Masters	A	A	QF	QF	A/NH	NH	4–2
Paris Masters	A	A	2R	A	A	A	1–1
Win–loss	0–0	0–0	3–2	2–3	0–0	1–0	6–5
