= Gero Kretschmer =

German tennis player

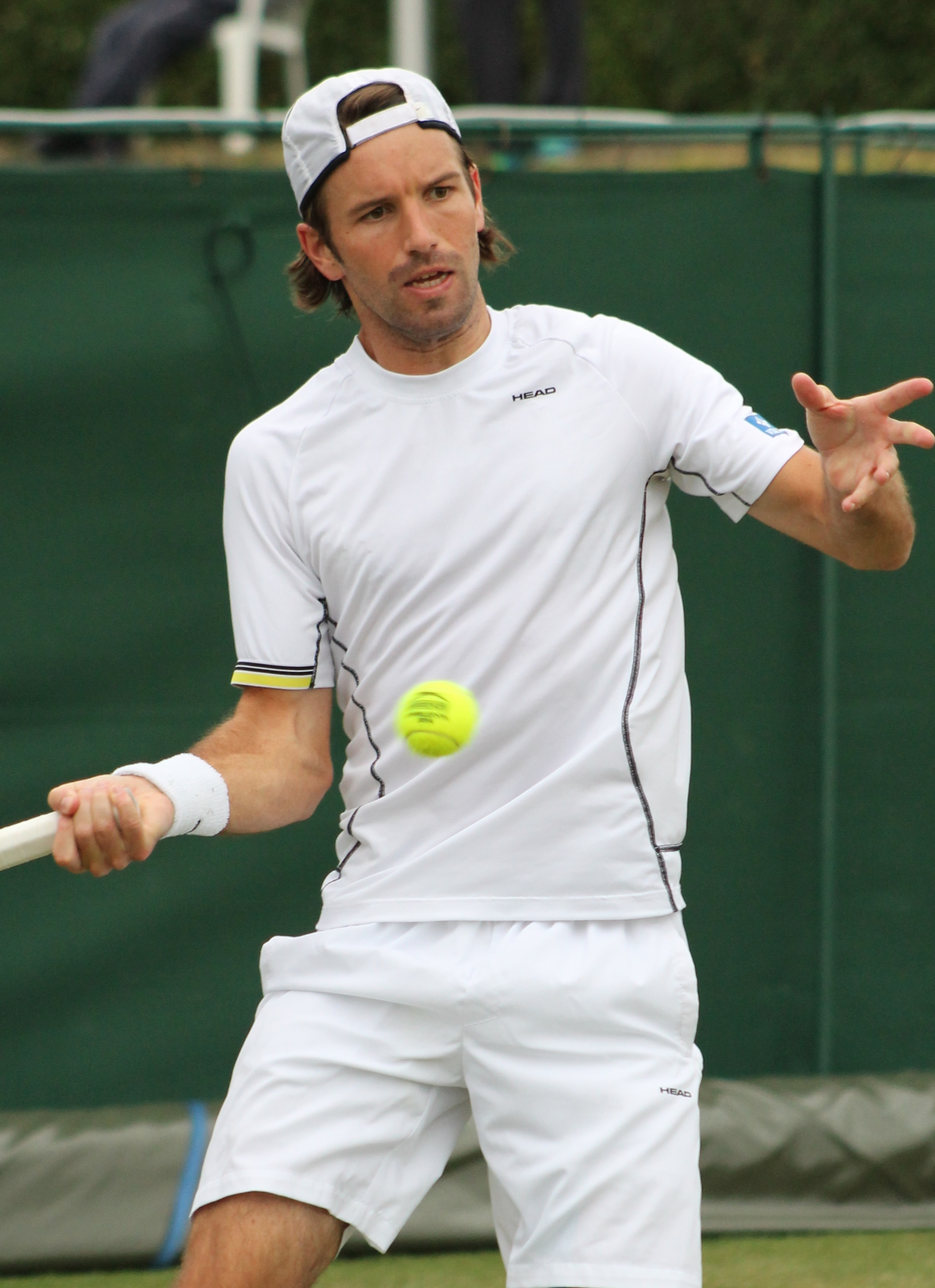
- Full name: Gero Kretschmer
- Country (sports): Germany
- Residence: Cologne, Germany
- Born: 6 May 1985 (age 40) Cologne, Federal Republic of Germany
- Height: 1.89 m (6 ft 2 1/2 in)
- Turned pro: 2004
- Retired: 2017
- Plays: Right-handed (two-handed backhand)
- Prize money: US$ 219,517

Singles
- Career record: 0–0
- Highest ranking: No. 316 (14 June 2010)

Doubles
- Career record: 14–21
- Career titles: 1
- Highest ranking: No. 79 (26 May 2014)

Grand Slam doubles results
- Wimbledon: 1R (2015)

Gero Kretschmer (German pronunciation: [ˈɡeːʁo ˈkʁɛtʃmɐ]; born 6 May 1985) is a retired German tennis player. He was a doubles specialist, who achieved his highest doubles ranking of world No. 79 in May 2014. He won his only ATP World Tour title with partner Alexander Satschko as alternates in Quito on 7 February 2015.

== ATP career finals ==
=== Doubles: 1 (1 title) ===
| Legend Grand Slam Tournaments (0–0) ATP World Tour Finals (0–0) ATP World Tour Masters 1000 (0–0) ATP World Tour 500 Series (0–0) ATP World Tour 250 Series (1–0) | Finals by surface Hard (0–0) Clay (1–0) Grass (0–0) |

| Result | Date | Tournament | Tier | Surface | Partner | Opponents | Score |
|---|---|---|---|---|---|---|---|
| Win | Feb 2015 | Ecuador Open, Ecuador | 250 Series | Clay | (Germany) Alexander Satschko | (Dominican Republic) Víctor Estrella Burgos (Brazil) João Souza | 7–5, 7–6^{(7–3)} |

== ATP Challenger Tour finals ==
=== Doubles: 24 (9 titles, 15 runner-ups) ===
Finals by surface
Hard (3–4)
Clay (6–11)
Grass (0–0)

| Result | W–L | Date | Tournament | Surface | Partner | Opponents | Score |
|---|---|---|---|---|---|---|---|
| Loss | 0–1 | Apr 2010 | Pereira, Colombia | Clay | (Germany) Alexander Satschko | (Germany) Dominik Meffert (Austria) Philipp Oswald | 7–6^{(7–4)}, 6–7^{(5–7)}, [5–10] |
| Loss | 0–2 | May 2010 | Sarasota, United States | Clay | (Germany) Alexander Satschko | (United States) Brian Battistone (United States) Ryler DeHeart | 7–5, 6–7^{(4–7)}, [8–10] |
| Win | 1–2 | Aug 2010 | Geneva, Switzerland | Clay | (Germany) Alexander Satschko | (Austria) Philipp Oswald (Austria) Martin Slanar | 6–3, 4–6, [11–9] |
| Loss | 1–3 | Sep 2010 | Bogotá, Colombia | Clay | (Germany) Alexander Satschko | (Brazil) Franco Ferreiro (Brazil) André Sá | 6–7^{(6–8)}, 4–6 |
| Loss | 1–4 | Oct 2010 | Cali, Colombia | Clay | (Germany) Alexander Satschko | (Germany) Andre Begemann (Germany) Martin Emmrich | 4–6, 6–7^{(5–7)} |
| Loss | 1–5 | Jun 2013 | Košice, Slovakia | Clay | (Germany) Alexander Satschko | (Slovakia) Kamil Čapkovič (Slovakia) Igor Zelenay | 4–6, 6–7^{(5–7)} |
| Loss | 1–6 | Jul 2013 | Scheveningen, Netherlands | Clay | (Germany) Alexander Satschko | (Netherlands) Antal van der Duim (Netherlands) Boy Westerhof | 3–6, 3–6 |
| Win | 2–6 | Jul 2013 | Poznań, Poland | Clay | (Germany) Alexander Satschko | (Poland) Mateusz Kowalczyk (Finland) Henri Kontinen | 6–3, 6–3 |
| Loss | 2–7 | Nov 2013 | Casablanca, Morocco | Clay | (Germany) Alexander Satschko | (Italy) Riccardo Ghedin (Italy) Claudio Grassi | 4–6, 4–6 |
| Loss | 2–8 | Nov 2013 | Bratislava, Slovakia | Hard (i) | (Germany) Jan-Lennard Struff | (Finland) Henri Kontinen (Sweden) Andreas Siljeström | 6–7^{(6–8)}, 2–6 |
| Win | 3–8 | Jan 2014 | São Paulo, Brazil | Hard | (Germany) Alexander Satschko | (Colombia) Nicolás Barrientos (Dominican Republic) Víctor Estrella Burgos | 4–6, 7–5, [10–6] |
| Loss | 3–9 | Apr 2014 | Le Gosier, Guadeloupe | Hard | (New Zealand) Michael Venus | (Poland) Tomasz Bednarek (Canada) Adil Shamasdin | 5–7, 7–6^{(7–5)}, [8–10] |
| Win | 4–9 | Mar 2015 | Shenzhen, China | Hard | (Germany) Alexander Satschko | (India) Saketh Myneni (India) Divij Sharan | 6–1, 3–6, [10–2] |
| Loss | 4–10 | Aug 2015 | Manerbio, Italy | Clay | (Germany) Alexander Satschko | (Spain) Daniel Muñoz de la Nava (Italy) Flavio Cipolla | 6–7^{(5–7)}, 6–3, [9–11] |
| Win | 5–10 | Sep 2015 | Como, Italy | Clay | (Germany) Alexander Satschko | (France) Kenny de Schepper (France) Maxime Teixeira | 7–6^{(7–3)}, 6–4 |
| Loss | 5–11 | Jan 2016 | Bangkok, Thailand | Hard | (Germany) Alexander Satschko | (Sweden) Johan Brunström (Sweden) Andreas Siljeström | 3–6, 4–6 |
| Loss | 5–12 | Jan 2016 | Bangkok, Thailand | Hard | (Germany) Alexander Satschko | (Netherlands) Wesley Koolhof (Netherlands) Matwé Middelkoop | 3–6, 6–7^{(1–7)} |
| Win | 6–12 | Mar 2016 | Guadalajara, Mexico | Hard | (Germany) Alexander Satschko | (Mexico) Santiago González (Croatia) Mate Pavić | 6–3, 4–6, [10–2] |
| Win | 7–12 | Apr 2016 | Napoli, Italy | Clay | (Germany) Alexander Satschko | (Italy) Matteo Donati (Italy) Stefano Napolitano | 6–1, 6–3 |
| Win | 8–12 | Apr 2017 | Qingdao, China | Clay | (Germany) Alexander Satschko | (Germany) Andreas Mies (Germany) Oscar Otte | 2–6, 7–6^{(8–6)}, [10–3] |
| Win | 9–12 | Jun 2017 | Vicenza, Italy | Clay | (Germany) Alexander Satschko | (United States) Sekou Bangoura (Austria) Tristan-Samuel Weissborn | 6–4, 7–6^{(7–4)} |
| Loss | 9–13 | Jun 2017 | Lyon, France | Clay | (Germany) Alexander Satschko | (Belgium) Sander Gillé (Belgium) Joran Vliegen | 7–6^{(7–2)}, 6–7^{(2–7)}, [12–14] |
| Loss | 9–14 | Jul 2017 | Braunschweig, Germany | Clay | (Germany) Kevin Krawietz | (Austria) Julian Knowle (Slovakia) Igor Zelenay | 3–6, 6–7^{(3–7)} |
| Loss | 9–15 | Jul 2017 | Prague, Czech Republic | Clay | (Germany) Andreas Mies | (Czech Republic) Jan Šátral (Austria) Tristan-Samuel Weissborn | 3–6, 7–5, [3–10] |

== Doubles performance timeline ==
Key
| W | F | SF | QF | #R | RR | Q# | DNQ | A | NH |

(W) winner; (F) finalist; (SF) semifinalist; (QF) quarterfinalist; (#R) rounds 4, 3, 2, 1; (RR) round-robin stage; (Q#) qualification round; (DNQ) did not qualify; (A) absent; (NH) not held; (SR) strike rate (events won / competed); (W–L) win–loss record.

| Tournament | 2006 | 2007 | 2008 | 2009 | 2010 | 2011 | 2012 | 2013 | 2014 | 2015 | 2016 | 2017 | W–L |
|---|---|---|---|---|---|---|---|---|---|---|---|---|---|
Grand Slam tournaments
| Australian Open | A | A | A | A | A | A | A | A | A | A | A | A | 0–0 |
| French Open | A | A | A | A | A | A | A | A | A | A | A | A | 0–0 |
| Wimbledon | A | A | A | A | A | A | A | A | Q2 | 1R | Q1 | A | 0–1 |
| US Open | A | A | A | A | A | A | A | A | A | A | A | A | 0–0 |
| Win–loss | 0–0 | 0–0 | 0–0 | 0–0 | 0–0 | 0–0 | 0–0 | 0–0 | 0–0 | 0–1 | 0–0 | 0–0 | 0–1 |
Career statistics
| Titles / Finals | 0 / 0 | 0 / 0 | 0 / 0 | 0 / 0 | 0 / 0 | 0 / 0 | 0 / 0 | 0 / 0 | 0 / 0 | 1 / 1 | 0 / 0 | 0 / 0 | 1 / 1 |
| Overall win–loss | 0–0 | 0–0 | 0–0 | 0–0 | 0–0 | 0–0 | 0–0 | 1–1 | 3–5 | 4–7 | 5–7 | 1–1 | 14–21 |
| Year-end ranking | 607 | 760 | 941 | 614 | 172 | 514 | 403 | 119 | 128 | 84 | 111 | 140 | 40% |
