= Alexander Satschko =

German tennis player

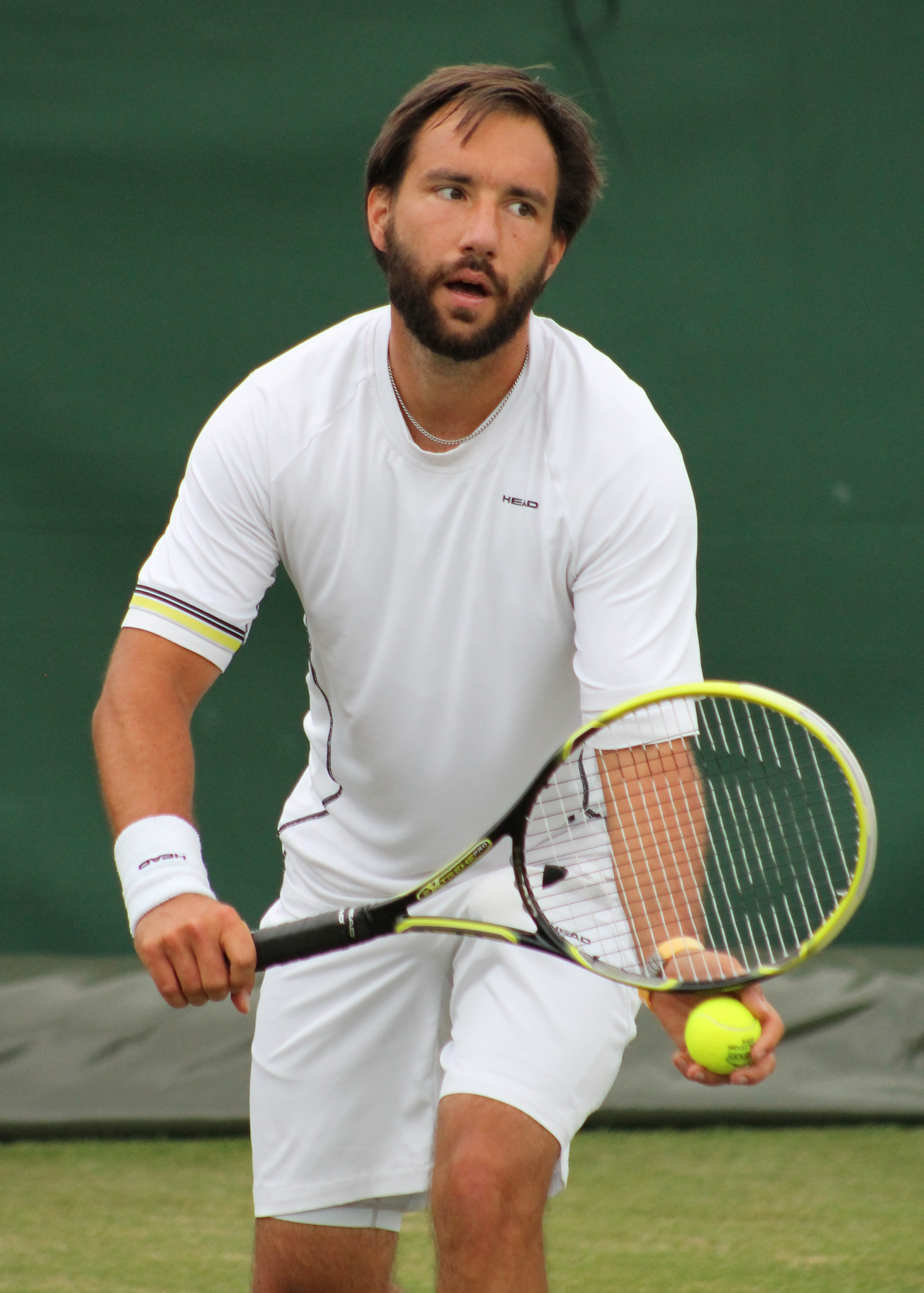
- Full name: Alexander Satschko
- Country (sports): Germany
- Born: 12 November 1980 (age 45) Deggendorf, Germany
- Height: 1.80 m (5 ft 11 in)
- Turned pro: 2002
- Retired: 2017
- Plays: Right-handed
- Prize money: US$268,282

Singles
- Career record: 0–0
- Highest ranking: No. 259 (2 February 2009)

Grand Slam singles results
- Australian Open: Q2 (2009)

Doubles
- Career record: 12–23
- Career titles: 1
- Highest ranking: No. 80 (13 October 2014)

Grand Slam doubles results
- French Open: 1R (2015)
- Wimbledon: 1R (2015)

Alexander Satschko (born 12 November 1980) is a German retired tennis player. He was a doubles specialist, who achieved his highest doubles ranking of world No. 80 in October 2014. He won his first ATP World Tour title with partner Gero Kretschmer as alternates in Quito on 7 February 2015.

== ATP career finals ==
=== Doubles: 1 (1 title) ===
Legend Grand Slam Tournaments (0–0) ATP World Tour Finals (0–0) ATP World Tour Masters 1000 (0–0) ATP World Tour 500 Series (0–0) ATP World Tour 250 Series (1–0)	Finals by surface Hard (0–0) Clay (1–0) Grass (0–0)

Result	W–L	Date	Tournament	Tier	Surface	Partner	Opponents	Score
Win	1–0	Feb 2015	Ecuador Open, Ecuador	250 Series	Clay	(Germany) Gero Kretschmer	(Dominican Republic) Víctor Estrella Burgos (Brazil) João Souza	7–5, 7–6^{(7–3)}

== ATP Challenger Tour finals ==
=== Doubles: 28 (12 titles, 16 runner-ups) ===
Finals by surface
Hard (4–4)
Clay (8–12)
Grass (0–0)
Carpet (0–0)

Result	W–L	Date	Tournament	Surface	Partner	Opponents	Score
Win	1–0	Nov 2005	Puebla, Mexico	Hard	(Austria) Werner Eschauer	(Mexico) Santiago González (Mexico) Alejandro Hernández	6–1, 6–4
Loss	1–1	Apr 2006	Leon, Mexico	Hard	(Poland) Dawid Olejniczak	(Mexico) Juan Manuel Elizondo (Mexico) Miguel Gallardo Valles	3–6, 4–6
Win	2–1	Jul 2006	Cuenca, Ecuador	Clay	(Germany) Frank Moser	(Colombia) Santiago Giraldo (Colombia) Carlos Salamanca	3–6, 6–3, [10–6]
Loss	2–2	Apr 2010	Pereira, Colombia	Clay	(Germany) Gero Kretschmer	(Germany) Dominik Meffert (Austria) Philipp Oswald	7–6^{(7–4)}, 6–7^{(5–7)}, [5–10]
Loss	2–3	May 2010	Sarasota, United States	Clay	(Germany) Gero Kretschmer	(United States) Brian Battistone (United States) Ryler DeHeart	7–5, 6–7^{(4–7)}, [8–10]
Win	3–3	Aug 2010	Geneva, Switzerland	Clay	(Germany) Gero Kretschmer	(Austria) Philipp Oswald (Austria) Martin Slanar	6–3, 4–6, [11–9]
Loss	3–4	Sep 2010	Bogotá, Colombia	Clay	(Germany) Gero Kretschmer	(Brazil) Franco Ferreiro (Brazil) André Sá	6–7^{(6–8)}, 4–6
Loss	3–5	Oct 2010	Cali, Colombia	Clay	(Germany) Gero Kretschmer	(Germany) Andre Begemann (Germany) Martin Emmrich	4–6, 6–7^{(5–7)}
Loss	3–6	Jun 2013	Košice, Slovakia	Clay	(Germany) Gero Kretschmer	(Slovakia) Kamil Čapkovič (Slovakia) Igor Zelenay	4–6, 6–7^{(5–7)}
Loss	3–7	Jul 2013	Scheveningen, Netherlands	Clay	(Germany) Gero Kretschmer	(Netherlands) Antal van der Duim (Netherlands) Boy Westerhof	3–6, 3–6
Win	4–7	Jul 2013	Poznań, Poland	Clay	(Germany) Gero Kretschmer	(Poland) Mateusz Kowalczyk (Finland) Henri Kontinen	6–3, 6–3
Loss	4–8	Nov 2013	Casablanca, Morocco	Clay	(Germany) Gero Kretschmer	(Italy) Riccardo Ghedin (Italy) Claudio Grassi	4–6, 4–6
Loss	4–9	Nov 2013	Guayaquil, Ecuador	Clay	(Moldova) Roman Borvanov	(Netherlands) Stephan Fransen (Netherlands) Wesley Koolhof	6–1, 2–6, [5–10]
Win	5–9	Jan 2014	São Paulo, Brazil	Hard	(Germany) Gero Kretschmer	(Colombia) Nicolás Barrientos (Dominican Republic) Víctor Estrella Burgos	4–6, 7–5, [10–6]
Loss	5–10	Sep 2014	Genoa, Italy	Clay	(Germany) Frank Moser	(Italy) Daniele Bracciali (Italy) Potito Starace	3–6, 4–6
Loss	5–11	Sep 2014	Biella, Italy	Clay	(Germany) Frank Moser	(Italy) Marco Cecchinato (Italy) Matteo Viola	5–7, 0–6
Loss	5–12	Oct 2014	Tashkent, Uzbekistan	Hard	(Germany) Frank Moser	(Slovenia) Lukáš Lacko (Croatia) Ante Pavić	3–6, 6–3, [11–13]
Win	6–12	Mar 2015	Shenzhen, China	Hard	(Germany) Gero Kretschmer	(India) Saketh Myneni (India) Divij Sharan	6–1, 3–6, [10–2]
Loss	6–13	Aug 2015	Manerbio, Italy	Clay	(Germany) Gero Kretschmer	(Spain) Daniel Muñoz de la Nava (Italy) Flavio Cipolla	6–7^{(5–7)}, 6–3, [9–11]
Win	7–13	Sep 2015	Como, Italy	Clay	(Germany) Gero Kretschmer	(France) Kenny de Schepper (France) Maxime Teixeira	7–6^{(7–3)}, 6–4
Loss	7–14	Jan 2016	Bangkok, Thailand	Hard	(Germany) Gero Kretschmer	(Sweden) Johan Brunström (Sweden) Andreas Siljeström	3–6, 4–6
Loss	7–15	Jan 2016	Bangkok, Thailand	Hard	(Germany) Gero Kretschmer	(Netherlands) Wesley Koolhof (Netherlands) Matwé Middelkoop	3–6, 6–7^{(1–7)}
Win	8–15	Mar 2016	Guadalajara, Mexico	Hard	(Germany) Gero Kretschmer	(Mexico) Santiago González (Croatia) Mate Pavić	6–3, 4–6, [10–2]
Win	9–15	Apr 2016	Napoli, Italy	Clay	(Germany) Gero Kretschmer	(Italy) Matteo Donati (Italy) Stefano Napolitano	6–1, 6–3
Win	10–15	Apr 2016	Blois, France	Clay	(Germany) Simon Stadler	(China) Mao-Xin Gong (Japan) Yasutaka Uchiyama	6–3, 7–6^{(7–2)}
Win	11–15	Apr 2017	Qingdao, China	Clay	(Germany) Gero Kretschmer	(Germany) Andreas Mies (Germany) Oscar Otte	2–6, 7–6^{(8–6)}, [10–3]
Win	12–15	Jun 2017	Vicenza, Italy	Clay	(Germany) Gero Kretschmer	(United States) Sekou Bangoura (Austria) Tristan-Samuel Weissborn	6–4, 7–6^{(7–4)}
Loss	12–16	Jun 2017	Lyon, France	Clay	(Germany) Gero Kretschmer	(Belgium) Sander Gillé (Belgium) Joran Vliegen	7–6^{(7–2)}, 6–7^{(2–7)}, [12–14]

== Doubles performance timeline ==
Key
W	F	SF	QF	#R	RR	Q#	DNQ	A	NH

(W) winner; (F) finalist; (SF) semifinalist; (QF) quarterfinalist; (#R) rounds 4, 3, 2, 1; (RR) round-robin stage; (Q#) qualification round; (DNQ) did not qualify; (A) absent; (NH) not held; (SR) strike rate (events won / competed); (W–L) win–loss record.

Current till 2017 ATP World Tour

Tournament	2003	2004	2005	2006	2007	2008	2009	2010	2011	2012	2013	2014	2015	2016	2017	W–L
Grand Slam tournaments
Australian Open	A	A	A	A	A	A	A	A	A	A	A	A	A	A	A	0–0
French Open	A	A	A	A	A	A	A	A	A	A	A	A	1R	A	A	0–1
Wimbledon	A	A	A	A	A	A	A	A	A	A	A	Q2	1R	Q1	A	0–1
US Open	A	A	A	A	A	A	A	A	A	A	A	A	A	A	A	0–0
Win–loss	0–0	0–0	0–0	0–0	0–0	0–0	0–0	0–0	0–0	0–0	0–0	0–0	0–2	0–0	0–0	0–2
Career statistics
Titles / Finals	0 / 0	0 / 0	0 / 0	0 / 0	0 / 0	0 / 0	0 / 0	0 / 0	0 / 0	0 / 0	0 / 0	0 / 0	1 / 1	0 / 0	0 / 0	1 / 1
Overall win–loss	0–0	0–0	0–0	0–0	0–0	0–0	0–0	0–0	0–0	0–0	1–1	4–8	4–8	2–5	1–1	12–23
Year-end ranking	699	884	327	234	394	349	649	158	286	203	115	97	86	125	157	34%
