= Víctor Estrella Burgos =

Dominican tennis player (born 1980)

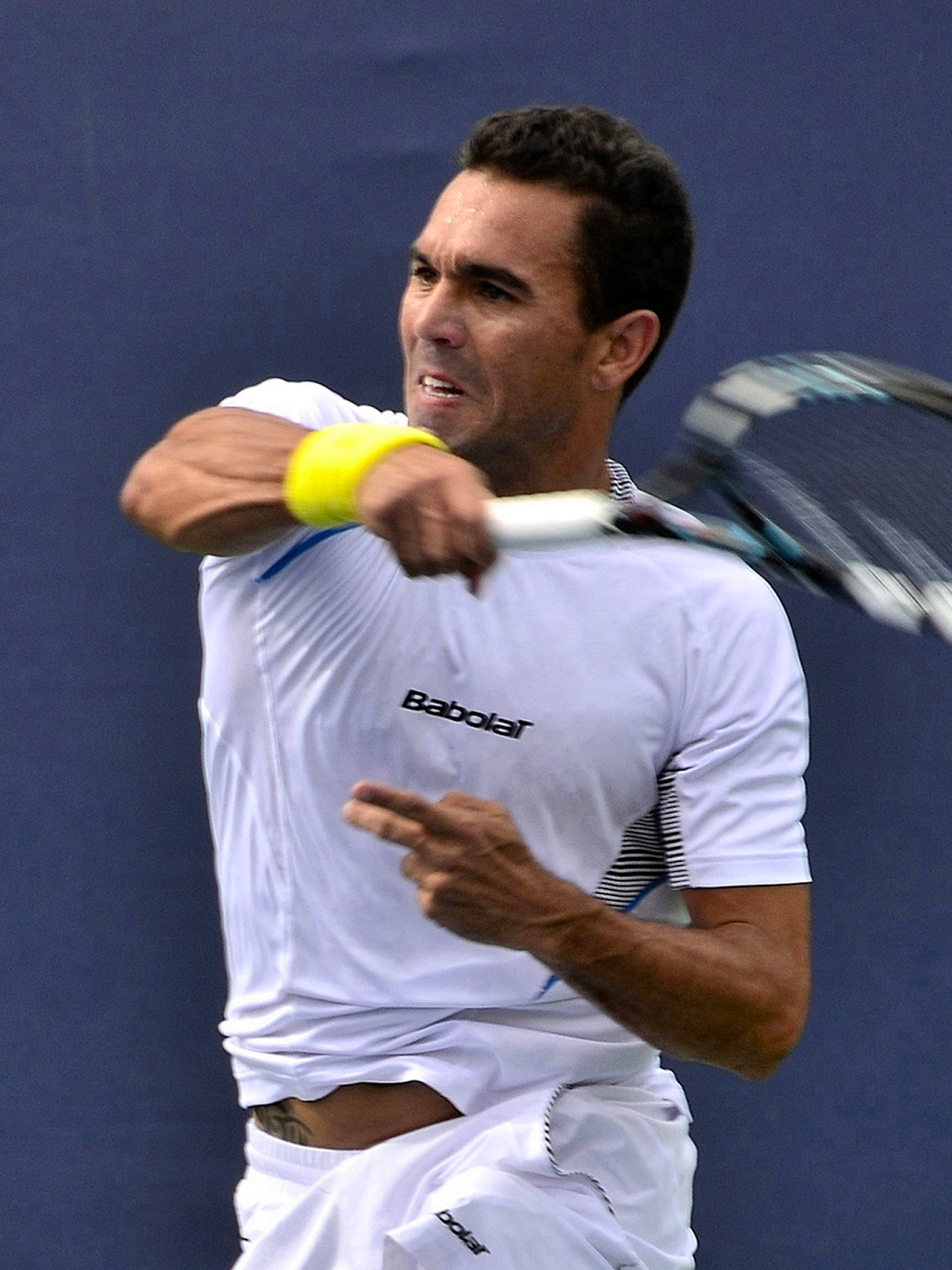
- Burgos at 2013 US Open
- Country (sports): Dominican Republic
- Residence: Santiago de los Caballeros, Dominican Republic
- Born: August 2, 1980 (age 46) Santiago de los Caballeros, Dominican Republic
- Height: 1.70 m (5 ft 7 in)
- Turned pro: 2002
- Retired: 2019 (last doubles match 2022)
- Plays: Right-handed (one-handed backhand)
- Prize money: US$2,164,736

Singles
- Career record: 84–81
- Career titles: 3
- Highest ranking: No. 43 (13 July 2015)

Grand Slam singles results
- Australian Open: 2R (2017)
- French Open: 2R (2016, 2017)
- Wimbledon: 2R (2015)
- US Open: 3R (2014)

Other tournaments
- Olympic Games: 1R (2016)

Doubles
- Career record: 37–47
- Career titles: 0
- Highest ranking: No. 135 (13 July 2015)

Grand Slam doubles results
- Australian Open: 1R (2016, 2018)
- French Open: 1R (2015, 2017)
- Wimbledon: 1R (2015)
- US Open: 3R (2016)

Team competitions
- Davis Cup: WG-PO (2015)
Medal record
Representing Dominican Republic
Pan American Games
Bronze medal – third place	2011 Guadalajara	Singles
Central American and Caribbean Games
Gold medal – first place	2010 Mayagüez	Singles
Gold medal – first place	2014 Veracruz	Singles
Gold medal – first place	2018 Barranquilla	Singles
Gold medal – first place	2018 Barranquilla	Men's doubles
Gold medal – first place	2018 Barranquilla	Team
Silver medal – second place	2002 San Salvador	Team
Silver medal – second place	2006 Cartagena	Men's doubles
Bronze medal – third place	2006 Cartagena	Singles
Bronze medal – third place	2006 Cartagena	Mixed doubles
Bronze medal – third place	2014 Veracruz	Mixed doubles

Víctor Estrella Burgos (Latin American Spanish: [ˈbiɣtoɾ esˈtɾeʝa ˈβuɾɣos]; (Note: In isolation, Burgos is pronounced [ˈbuɾɣos].) born August 2, 1980) is a Dominican former professional tennis player. In 2014, Estrella became the first Dominican to reach the top 100 in the ATP rankings. He also became the first Dominican player to reach the semifinals in an ATP 250 tournament in Bogotá. In 2015, he also became the first tennis player from his country to participate in all four Grand Slams, playing in the Australian Open. In February 2015, he won his first career ATP title at the Ecuador Open, becoming the oldest first-time ATP tour winner in the Open Era. He successfully defended his title with a 100% winning record at the event in 2016 and 2017, but lost in the second round in 2018.

Estrella has been a member of the Davis Cup team from the Dominican Republic since 1998, posting a record of 41–17 in singles and 21–22 in doubles. Since 2014 he belongs to the Dominican olympic program CRESO.

Estrella Burgos reached a career-high singles ranking of world No. 43, achieved on July 13, 2015. He achieved a career-high doubles ranking of world No. 135, achieved on the same date.

== Junior career ==
Estrella Burgos began playing tennis at the age of 8.

Estrella Burgos played his first junior match in July 1996 at the age of 15 at a grade 5 tournament in the Dominican Republic. He did not play much junior tennis as he play just six tournaments in singles and five tournaments in doubles. His best result was a semifinal appearance at a grade 4 tournament in El Salvador in singles and a final appearance at a grade 4 tournament in the Dominican Republic in doubles. He did not play in any junior Grand Slams or any major junior tournaments.

Estrella Burgos ended his junior career with a high ranking of 360 in singles and 292 in doubles. He had an overall win–loss record of 9–6 in singles and 10–5 in doubles.

== Career ==
=== 2002–2013: Slow rise ===
Although playing his first ITF event in 2000, Estrella Burgos officially turned pro in 2002 at the age of 22. He reportedly did not take his career seriously until he was 26 when he decided that a career on the ATP Tour was the best option. For the first few years of his career, he played tournaments only located in The Americas. It was not until 2011 where he started to play in other parts of the world. Throughout 2002–2013, he earned a handful of ITF titles while also improving his year-end ranking.

Highlights during this period include qualifying for his first ATP tournament, the 2008 Cincinnati Masters which he qualified for but lost to Fernando Verdasco in the first round, winning his first challenger title in 2011, and winning a gold medal at the 2010 Central American and Caribbean Games and a bronze medal at the 2011 Pan American Games, both in singles.

In October 2012, Estrella Burgos suffered an elbow injury. He was contemplating retirement during this time but returned to tennis in April 2013.

At the age of 32, Estrella Burgos picked up his first ATP win at the 2013 Colombia Open defeating Facundo Argüello in the first round.

=== 2014: Breakout year ===
In early 2014, he became the first Dominican player to break into the top 100 and he started to qualify for ATP events and grand slams. His first grand slam was the 2014 French Open where he got an automatic qualification due to ranking but lost in the first round to 22nd seed Jerzy Janowicz in 4 sets.

At the 2014 Colombia Open, he went into the tournament as 8th seed and made the semifinals defeating the 1st seed and world number 14 Richard Gasquet along the way. He lost to eventual champion Bernard Tomic.

At the 2014 US Open, he made the third round which remains as his best result in a slam. He lost to Milos Raonic in straight sets which all went to tiebreaks.

At the 2014 Central American and Caribbean Games, Estrella Burgos repeated his gold medal feat from 2010 in singles and also won a bronze medal in mixed doubles.

Estrella Burgos would finish 2014 with a year-end ranking of 78 and a win–loss record of 9–10.

=== 2015: Best year of career ===
At the 2015 Ecuador Open, Estrella Burgos made his first ATP final. In the final, he defeated top seed and world No. 14 Feliciano López to win his first ATP title. Not only did he become the first Dominican to win an ATP title, but the oldest first-time ATP champion in Open Era history. He also made the final of the doubles draw partnering João Souza but lost to Gero Kretschmer and Alexander Satschko in straight sets.

At the 2015 Barcelona Open, he recorded his only win over a top 10 player when he defeated world number 9 Marin Čilić. He also beat future world number 3 Dominic Thiem during the tournament.

On July 13, 2015, he reach his career-high ranking of 43 and would finish 2015 with his best year-end rankings of 56 and a win–loss record of 20–20.

=== 2016–2017: More success on tour ===
Estrella Burgos made his second final in doubles at the 2016 U.S. Men's Clay Court Championship partnering Santiago González but lost to the Bryan brothers (Bob and Mike) in three sets.

He defended his title the Ecuador Open two more times in 2016 and 2017. He also played in the 2016 Summer Olympics but lost in the first round to Fabio Fognini in three sets.

He won his last challenger title in August 2017 against Damir Džumhur at the 2017 Santo Domingo Open in his home country of the Dominican Republic.

=== 2018: Downfall ===
At the 2018 Australian Open, he played his last grand slam match against world number 1 Rafael Nadal. He lost in straight sets.

His win streak at the Ecuador Open ended at the 2018 edition with a second round loss to Gerald Melzer.

He played his last ATP match after qualifying for the 2018 Hall of Fame Open after qualifying for the main draw where he lost in the first round against eventual finalist Ramkumar Ramanathan in straight sets.

At the 2018 Central American and Caribbean Games, Estrella Burgos won three gold medals for singles, doubles, and team event. It would be the last time he attended the games.

At the 2018 US Open qualifying, Estrella Burgos defeated 2nd seed Jürgen Zopp and Bjorn Fratangelo to make the qualifying competition. He lost to Stefano Travaglia in straight sets.

Estrella Burgos' ranking dropped to a low of 326 in November and he ended the year with a win–loss record of 2–9 and a year-end ranking of 278. A severe dip from his win–loss record of 9–10 and year-end ranking of 83 in 2017.

=== 2019: Retirement ===
On 5 August 2019, after playing in a few more challenger events and his ranking having dropped to 665 in the world, Estrella Burgos announced his retirement from professional tennis. His last tournament was the Santo Domingo Open, which was played in October.

On October 7, he won his last match against Marcelo Arévalo. On October 8, Estrella Burgos played his last match against Thiago Monteiro. He was honored as one of the biggest retirees in 2019.

=== Davis Cup ===
Estrella Burgos made his Davis Cup debut in 1998 at the age of 17. During his time with the Dominican Davis Cup team, he posted a win–loss record of 43–17 in singles, 22–23 in doubles, and 65–40 overall.

In 2015, the Dominican Republic entered the world group playoff for the first time in their history and were paired up against Germany. Estrella Burgos won the opening match in the series when he defeated Dustin Brown in four sets. He would lose his second singles match against Philipp Kohlschreiber in straight sets and the Dominican Republic would lose the series 4–1.

== Personal life ==
Estrella Burgos was born in Santiago de los Caballeros to father Elgio Felix and mother Ana. He also has three brothers; Hector, Henry and Felix.

Estrella Burgos' nickname is "Viti"

Estrella Burgos is also a baseball fan and likes to go to many games.

== Singles performance timeline ==
Key
W	F	SF	QF	#R	RR	Q#	P#	DNQ	A	Z#	PO	G	S	B	NMS	NTI	P	NH

(W) winner; (F) finalist; (SF) semifinalist; (QF) quarterfinalist; (#R) rounds 4, 3, 2, 1; (RR) round-robin stage; (Q#) qualification round; (P#) preliminary round; (DNQ) did not qualify; (A) absent; (Z#) Davis/Fed Cup Zonal Group (with number indication) or (PO) play-off; (G) gold, (S) silver or (B) bronze Olympic/Paralympic medal; (NMS) not a Masters tournament; (NTI) not a Tier I tournament; (P) postponed; (NH) not held; (SR) strike rate (events won / competed); (W–L) win–loss record.

Tournament	2000	2001	2002	2003	2004	2005	2006	2007	2008	2009	2010	2011	2012	2013	2014	2015	2016	2017	2018	2019	SR	W–L	Win%
Grand Slam tournaments
Australian Open	A	A	A	A	A	A	A	A	A	A	A	A	A	A	A	1R	1R	2R	1R	A	0 / 4	1–4	20%
French Open	A	A	A	A	A	A	A	A	A	Q1	A	Q1	Q1	A	1R	1R	2R	2R	Q1	A	0 / 4	2–4	33%
Wimbledon	A	A	A	A	A	A	A	A	A	Q1	A	Q1	A	Q1	1R	2R	1R	1R	A	A	0 / 4	1–4	20%
US Open	A	A	A	A	A	A	A	A	Q2	Q2	A	Q1	Q1	Q3	3R	1R	1R	A	Q3	A	0 / 3	2–3	40%
Win–loss	0–0	0–0	0–0	0–0	0–0	0–0	0–0	0–0	0–0	0–0	0–0	0–0	0–0	0–0	2–3	1–4	1–4	2–3	0–1	0–0	0 / 15	6–15	29%
ATP 1000 tournaments
Indian Wells Open	A	A	A	A	A	A	A	A	A	A	A	A	Q1	A	A	1R	1R	A	1R	A	0 / 3	0–3	0%
Miami Open	A	A	A	A	A	A	A	A	A	A	A	A	Q1	A	Q2	1R	1R	A	1R	A	0 / 3	0–3	0%
Monte-Carlo Masters	A	A	A	A	A	A	A	A	A	A	A	A	A	A	A	2R	A	A	A	A	0 / 1	1–1	50%
Madrid Open	not held		A	A	A	A	A	A	A	A	A	A	A	A	A	A	Q1	Q1	A	A	0 / 0	0–0	–
Italian Open	A	A	A	A	A	A	A	A	A	A	A	A	A	A	Q2	A	A	Q1	A	A	0 / 0	0–0	–
Cincinnati Open	A	A	A	A	A	A	A	A	1R	A	A	A	A	A	A	A	A	A	A	A	0 / 1	0–1	0%
Shanghai Masters	not held									A	A	A	A	A	A	2R	A	A	A	A	0 / 1	1–1	50%
Win–loss	0–0	0–0	0–0	0–0	0–0	0–0	0–0	0–0	0–1	0–0	0–0	0–0	0–0	0–0	0–0	2–4	0–2	0–0	0–2	0–0	0 / 9	2–9	18%
National representation
Summer Olympics	A	not held			A	not held			A	not held			A	not held			1R	not held			0 / 1	0–1	0%
Davis Cup	Z3	Z2	Z3	Z2	Z2	Z2	Z2	Z2	Z2	Z2	Z1	Z2	Z2	Z1	Z1	PO	Z1	Z1	Z1	Z1	0 / 0	43–17	72%
Win–loss	0–1	2–0	4–1	3–1	3–1	1–2	2–2	3–0	2–1	4–0	0–3	2–1	6–0	1–0	1–1	5–1	2–3	1–0	1–0	0–0	0 / 1	43–18	70%
Career statistics
Tournaments	0	0	0	0	0	0	0	0	1	0	0	0	0	1	9	20	18	11	9	0	69		
Titles / Finals	0 / 0	0 / 0	0 / 0	0 / 0	0 / 0	0 / 0	0 / 0	0 / 0	0 / 0	0 / 0	0 / 0	0 / 0	0 / 0	0 / 0	0 / 0	1 / 1	1 / 1	1 / 1	0 / 0	0 / 0	3 / 3		
Overall win–loss	0–0	2–0	0–0	3–1	3–1	1–2	2–2	3–0	2–2	4–0	0–3	2–1	6–0	2–1	9–10	20–20	14–19	9–10	2–9	0–0	84–81		
Win %		100%		75%	75%	33%	50%	100%	50%	100%	0%	67%	100%	67%	47%	50%	42%	47%	18%	–	51%		
Year-end ranking	N/A	N/A	1055	1061	1463	N/A	570	317	235	325	211	202	255	144	78	56	102	83	278	774	51%		

== ATP Tour finals ==
=== Singles: 3 (3 titles) ===
Legend Grand Slam ATP 1000 ATP 500 ATP 250 (3–0)	Finals by surface Clay (3–0) Hard Grass	Finals by setting Outdoor (3–0) Indoor

Result	W–L	Date	Tournament	Tier	Surface	Opponent	Score
Win	1–0	Feb 2015	Ecuador Open, Ecuador	ATP 250	Clay	(Spain) Feliciano López	6–2, 6–7^{(5–7)}, 7–6^{(7–5)}
Win	2–0	Feb 2016	Ecuador Open, Ecuador (2)	ATP 250	Clay	(Brazil) Thomaz Bellucci	4–6, 7–6^{(7–5)}, 6–2
Win	3–0	Feb 2017	Ecuador Open, Ecuador (3)	ATP 250	Clay	(Italy) Paolo Lorenzi	6–7^{(2–7)}, 7–5, 7–6^{(8–6)}

=== Doubles: 2 (2 runner-ups) ===
Legend Grand Slam (–) ATP 1000 (–) ATP 500 (–) ATP 250 (0–2)	Finals by surface Clay (0–2) Hard (–) Grass (–) Carpet (–)	Finals by setting Outdoor (0–2) Indoor (–)

Result	W–L	Date	Tournament	Tier	Surface	Partner	Opponents	Score
Loss	0–1	Feb 2015	Ecuador Open, Ecuador	ATP 250	Clay	(Brazil) João Souza	(Germany) Gero Kretschmer (Germany) Alexander Satschko	5–7, 6–7^{(3–7)}
Loss	0–2	Apr 2016	U.S. Men's Clay Court Championships, US	ATP 250	Clay	(Mexico) Santiago González	(United States) Bob Bryan (United States) Mike Bryan	6–4, 3–6, [8–10]

== ATP Challenger and ITF Tour finals ==
=== Singles: 39 (28 titles, 11 runner-ups) ===
Legend ATP Challenger Tour (7–4) ITF Futures (21–7)	Finals by surface Hard (15–6) Clay (13–5)

Result	W–L	Date	Tournament	Tier	Surface	Opponent	Score
Loss	0–1	May 2006	USA F9, Vero Beach	Futures	Clay	(The Bahamas) Ryan Sweeting	3–6, 0–6
Win	1–1	Jul 2006	USA F15, Buffalo	Futures	Clay	(United States) Marcus Fugate	4–6, 6–3, 6–2
Win	2–1	Jul 2006	USA F16, Pittsburgh	Futures	Clay	(Slovakia) Matej Bocko	7–6, 6–3
Loss	2–2	Jul 2006	USA F17, Peoria	Futures	Clay	(United States) Denis Zivkovic	2–6, 1–6
Loss	2–3	Mar 2007	USA F5, Harlingen	Futures	Hard	(United States) Alex Bogomolov Jr.	4–6, 1–6
Win	3–3	May 2007	USA F11, Tampa	Futures	Clay	(Italy) Stefano Ianni	6–2, 6–2
Loss	3–4	Oct 2007	Venezuela F5, Caracas	Futures	Hard	(Ecuador) Julio César Campozano	3–6, 3–6
Win	4–4	Oct 2007	Nicaragua F1, Managua	Futures	Hard	(Germany) Alexander Satschko	6–4, 3–6, 6–4
Win	5–4	Nov 2007	Dominican Republic F1, Santo Domingo	Futures	Hard	(Hungary) Ádám Kellner	6–4, 6–4
Win	6–4	Dec 2007	Dominican Republic F2, Santo Domingo	Futures	Hard	(Argentina) Nicolás Todero	6–3, 6–3
Win	7–4	Dec 2007	Dominican Republic F3, Santo Domingo	Futures	Hard	(Spain) Óscar Burrieza-López	7–6, 6–3
Win	8–4	Jun 2008	USA F12, Loomis	Futures	Hard	(Brazil) Ricardo Hocevar	6–4, 0–6, 7–6
Loss	8–5	Dec 2008	Dominican Republic F3, Santo Domingo	Futures	Hard	(Austria) Philipp Oswald	6–7^{(2–7)}, 4–6
Win	9–5	Dec 2008	Dominican Republic F4, Santo Domingo	Futures	Hard	(Russia) Andrey Kumantsov	7–6, 6–4
Win	10–5	Dec 2008	Dominican Republic F5, Santo Domingo	Futures	Hard	(Dominican Republic) Jhonson García	7–6, 6–4
Win	11–5	Nov 2009	Dominican Republic F1, Santo Domingo	Futures	Hard	(Lithuania) Ričardas Berankis	7–5, 6–1
Win	12–5	Dec 2009	Dominican Republic F2, Santo Domingo	Futures	Hard	(United States) Adam El Mihdawy	7–6, 6–3
Loss	12–6	Dec 2009	Dominican Republic F3, Santo Domingo	Futures	Hard	(Romania) Cătălin-Ionuț Gârd	4–6, 6–0, 4–6
Loss	12–7	Feb 2010	USA F4, Palm Coast	Futures	Clay	(Austria) Marco Mirnegg	1–6, 3–6
Win	13–7	Feb 2010	USA F5, Brownsville	Futures	Hard	(Canada) Vasek Pospisil	6–4, 6–3
Win	14–7	Sep 2010	Colombia F3, Manizales	Futures	Clay	(Colombia) Juan Sebastián Cabal	6–4, 6–4
Win	15–7	Nov 2010	Dominican Republic F1, Santo Domingo	Futures	Hard	(Netherlands) Matwé Middelkoop	6–1, 2–6, 6–1
Win	16–7	Dec 2010	Dominican Republic F2, Santo Domingo	Futures	Hard	(France) Pierre-Hugues Herbert	6–1, 6–3
Win	17–7	Dec 2010	Dominican Republic F3, Santo Domingo	Futures	Hard	(Netherlands) Matwé Middelkoop	6–4, 6–2
Win	18–7	Feb 2011	Panama F1, Panama City	Futures	Clay	(Argentina) Martín Alund	6–3, 6–0
Win	19–7	Nov 2011	Medellín, Colombia	Challenger	Clay	(Colombia) Alejandro Falla	6–7^{(2–7)}, 6–4, 6–4
Win	20–7	Feb 2012	Mexico F2, Mexico City	Futures	Hard	(Uruguay) Marcel Felder	7–6, 3–6, 6–2
Win	21–7	Aug 2012	Colombia F1, Bogotá	Futures	Clay	(Colombia) Nicolás Barrientos	7–5, 6–4
Win	22–7	Aug 2013	Colombia F3, Medellín	Futures	Clay	(Peru) Mauricio Echazú	6–4, 0–6, 6–3
Win	23–7	Sep 2013	Quito, Ecuador	Challenger	Clay	(Argentina) Marco Trungelliti	2–6, 6–4, 6–4
Win	24–7	Nov 2013	Bogotá, Colombia	Challenger	Clay	(Brazil) Thomaz Bellucci	6–2, 3–0, ret.
Loss	24–8	Feb 2014	Morelos, Mexico	Challenger	Hard	(Austria) Gerald Melzer	1–6, 4–6
Win	25–8	Mar 2014	Salinas, Ecuador	Challenger	Clay	(Argentina) Andrea Collarini	6–3, 6–4
Win	26–8	Sep 2014	Pereira, Colombia	Challenger	Clay	(Brazil) João Souza	7–6^{(7–5)}, 3–6, 7–6^{(8–6)}
Loss	26–9	Oct 2014	Cali, Colombia	Challenger	Clay	(Italy) Paolo Lorenzi	6–4, 3–6, 3–6
Win	27–9	Feb 2015	Morelos, Mexico	Challenger	Hard	(Bosnia and Herzegovina) Damir Džumhur	7–5, 6–4
Loss	27–10	Nov 2015	Monterrey, Mexico	Challenger	Hard	(Netherlands) Thiemo de Bakker	6–7^{(1–7)}, 6–4, 3–6
Loss	27–11	Jul 2016	Cali, Colombia	Challenger	Clay	(Barbados) Darian King	7–5, 4–6, 5–7
Win	28–11	Aug 2017	Santo Domingo, Dominican Republic	Challenger	Clay	(Bosnia and Herzegovina) Damir Džumhur	7–6^{(7–4)}, 6–4

=== Doubles: 24 (9 titles, 15 runner-ups) ===
Legend ATP Challenger Tour (4–9) ITF Futures (5–6)	Finals by surface Hard (5–8) Clay (4–7)

Result	W–L	Date	Tournament	Tier	Surface	Partner	Opponents	Score
Win	1–0	Jan 2003	Guatemala F1, Guatemala City	Futures	Hard	(Dominican Republic) Jhonson García	(Brazil) Bruno Soares (Brazil) Márcio Torres	6–7^{(4–7)}, 6–4, 7–6^{(15–13)}
Loss	1–1	Jun 2007	Carson, United States	Challenger	Hard	(United States) Alberto Francis	(United States) Rajeev Ram (United States) Bobby Reynolds	6–7^{(8–10)}, 2–6
Win	2–1	Oct 2007	Venezuela F6, Caracas	Futures	Hard	(Venezuela) Román Recarte	(Venezuela) Piero Luisi (Venezuela) Roberto Maytín	5–7, 6–2, [10–6]
Loss	2–2	Oct 2007	Nicaragua F1, Managua	Futures	Hard	(Bolivia) Jose-Roberto Velasco	(Colombia) Alejandro González (Argentina) Nicolás Todero	5–7, 4–6
Loss	2–3	Jun 2008	USA F12, Loomis	Futures	Hard	(Brazil) Ricardo Hocevar	(Australia) G.D. Jones (Australia) Daniel King-Turner	2–6, 3–6
Loss	2–4	Jul 2008	Manta, Ecuador	Challenger	Hard	(Argentina) Alejandro Fabbri	(Colombia) Alejandro González (Colombia) Eduardo Struvay	5–7, 6–3, [7–10]
Loss	2–5	Nov 2008	Medellín, Colombia	Challenger	Clay	(Argentina) Juan-Pablo Amado	(Colombia) Juan Sebastián Cabal (Colombia) Alejandro Falla	4–3 ret.
Win	3–5	Dec 2008	Dominican Republic F5, Santo Domingo	Futures	Hard	(Dominican Republic) Jhonson García	(Russia) Andrey Kuznetsov (United States) Ryan Young	6–4, 6–0
Loss	3–6	Feb 2009	Colombia F1, Medellín	Futures	Clay	(Argentina) Juan-Pablo Amado	(Colombia) Alejandro González (Colombia) Eduardo Struvay	2–6, 7–6^{(8–6)}, [5–10]
Loss	3–7	Apr 2009	Mexico City, Mexico	Challenger	Hard	(Brazil) João Souza	(Thailand) Sonchat Ratiwatana (Thailand) Sanchai Ratiwatana	3–6, 3–6
Win	4–7	May 2009	Pereira, Colombia	Challenger	Clay	(Brazil) João Souza	(Colombia) Juan Sebastián Cabal (Colombia) Alejandro Falla	6–4, 6–4
Win	5–7	May 2009	Sarasota, United States	Challenger	Clay	(Mexico) Santiago González	(India) Harsh Mankad (United States) Kaes Van't Hof	6–2, 6–4
Loss	5–8	Jan 2010	USA F2, Hollywood	Futures	Clay	(Spain) Arnau Brugués Davi	(Italy) Stefano Ianni (Italy) Matteo Viola	7–6^{(7–1)}, 1–6, [7–10]
Win	6–8	Feb 2010	USA F5, Brownsville	Futures	Hard	(Spain) Arnau Brugués Davi	(United States) Brett Joelson (Canada) Chris Klingemann	7–6, 6–3
Loss	6–9	Jul 2010	Bogotá, Colombia	Challenger	Clay	(Colombia) Alejandro González	(Colombia) Juan Sebastián Cabal (Colombia) Robert Farah	6–7^{(6–8)}, 4–6
Win	7–9	Nov 2010	Cancún, Mexico	Challenger	Clay	(Mexico) Santiago González	(Austria) Rainer Eitzinger (Mexico) César Ramírez	6–1, 7–6^{(7–3)}
Loss	7–10	Oct 2011	Aguascalientes, Mexico	Challenger	Clay	(Ecuador) Julio César Campozano	(Mexico) Santiago González (Mexico) Daniel Garza	4–6, 7–5, [7–3]
Loss	7–11	Feb 2012	Mexico F2, Mexico City	Futures	Hard	(Venezuela) Piero Luisi	(United States) Austin Krajicek (United States) Devin Britton	3–6, 4–6
Win	8–11	Jul 2012	Bogotá, Colombia	Challenger	Clay	(Brazil) Marcelo Demoliner	(Italy) Thomas Fabbiano (Italy) Riccardo Ghedin	6–4, 6–2
Loss	8–12	Aug 2012	Manta, Ecuador	Challenger	Hard	(Brazil) João Souza	(Peru) Duilio Beretta (Argentina) Renzo Olivo	3–6, 0–6
Loss	8–13	Aug 2012	Colombia F1, Bogotá	Futures	Clay	(Colombia) Michael Quintero	(Peru) Mauricio Echazú (Mexico) César Ramírez	4–6, 5–7
Win	9–13	Apr 2013	Mexico F5, Córdoba	Futures	Hard	(Puerto Rico) Alex Llompart	(Philippines) Ruben Gonzales (Australia) Chris Letcher	6–3, 6–3
Loss	9–14	Sep 2013	Porto Alegre, Brazil	Challenger	Clay	(Brazil) João Souza	(Argentina) Guillermo Durán (Argentina) Máximo González	6–3, 2–6, [5–10]
Loss	9–15	Jan 2014	São Paulo, Brazil	Challenger	Hard	(Colombia) Nicolás Barrientos	(Germany) Alexander Satschko (Germany) Gero Kretschmer	6–4, 5–7, [6–10]

== Wins over top 10 players ==
#	Player	Rank	Event	Surface	Rd	Score	EB rank
2015
1.	(Croatia) Marin Čilić	9	Barcelona, Spain	Clay	2R	6–4, 6–4	53
