= Ecuador Open (tennis) =

Ecuador Open Quito

Defunct tennis tournament
- Founded: 2015
- Abolished: 2018
- Editions: 4
- Location: Quito; Ecuador
- Venue: Club Jacarandá
- Category: ATP World Tour 250 series
- Surface: Clay / outdoors
- Draw: 28S /16D / 32Q
- Prize money: $494,310
- Website: ecuadoropen.com.ec

The Ecuador Open Quito was a men's tennis event on the ATP Tour held in the Ecuadorean capital of Quito. Begun in 2015, it was part of the ATP 250 Series. The tournament was played on outdoor clay courts. The event replaced the Chile Open.

On 24 August 2018, tournament organisers announced that the tournament had folded due to lack of financial support.

== History ==
Quito was previously home to the Quito Open, a Grand Prix-affiliated tournament played from 1979 to 1982. The city is located at 2800 metres above sea level, more than twice as high than the Alps tournaments. Players must adapt to thinner air, which causes breathing difficulties and makes the ball faster.

Victor Estrella Burgos won the title in 2015, successfully defended it in 2016 and did so again in 2017. However, he lost in the second round of the 2018 edition to Gerald Melzer.

== Results ==
=== Singles ===
Year	Champions	Runners-up	Score
2015	(Dominican Republic) Víctor Estrella Burgos	(Spain) Feliciano López	6–2, 6–7^{(5–7)}, 7–6^{(7–5)}
2016	(Dominican Republic) Víctor Estrella Burgos (2)	(Brazil) Thomaz Bellucci	4–6, 7–6^{(7–5)}, 6–2
2017	(Dominican Republic) Víctor Estrella Burgos (3)	(Italy) Paolo Lorenzi	6–7^{(2–7)}, 7–5, 7–6^{(8–6)}
2018	(Spain) Roberto Carballés Baena	(Spain) Albert Ramos Viñolas	6–3, 4–6, 6–4
2019	replaced by Córdoba Open		

=== Doubles ===
Year	Champions	Runners-up	Score
2015	(Germany) Gero Kretschmer (Germany) Alexander Satschko	(Dominican Republic) Victor Estrella Burgos (Brazil) João Souza	7–5, 7–6^{(7–3)}
2016	(Spain) Pablo Carreño Busta (Argentina) Guillermo Durán	(Brazil) Thomaz Bellucci (Brazil) Marcelo Demoliner	7–5, 6–4
2017	(United States) James Cerretani (Austria) Philipp Oswald	(Chile) Julio Peralta (Argentina) Horacio Zeballos	6–3, 2–1, ret.
2018	(Chile) Nicolás Jarry (Chile) Hans Podlipnik-Castillo	(United States) Austin Krajicek (United States) Jackson Withrow	7–6^{(8–6)}, 6–3
2019	replaced by Córdoba Open		

== See also ==
- Quito Open – men's Grand Prix tournament (1979–1982)
