= 2010 Copa Petrobras São Paulo – Doubles =

Doubles
- 2010 Copa Petrobras São Paulo

Final
- Champions: (Brazil) Franco Ferreiro (Brazil) André Sá
- Runners-up: (Portugal) Rui Machado (Spain) Daniel Muñoz-de la Nava
- Score: 3–6, 7–6(2), [10–8]

Events
Singles	Doubles
← 2009 ·	Copa Petrobras São Paulo	· 2011 →

Franco Ferreiro and Ricardo Mello are the defending champions. Mello decided not to participate this year.
Ferreiro competed with André Sá and they won this year's edition after beating Rui Machado and Daniel Muñoz-de la Nava 3–6, 7–6(2), [10–8] in the final.

== Seeds ==
1. (Brazil) Franco Ferreiro / (Brazil) André Sá (champions)
2. (Argentina) ~~Juan Pablo Brzezicki~~ / (Portugal) ~~Leonardo Tavares~~ (withdrew due to Brzezicki's muscle tear injury)
3. (Portugal) Rui Machado / (Spain) Daniel Muñoz-de la Nava (final)
4. (Brazil) Rogério Dutra da Silva / (Brazil) João Souza (first round)

== Draw ==
=== Key ===
- Q = Qualifier
- WC = Wild card
- LL = Lucky loser
- Alt = Alternate
- SE = Special exempt
- PR = Protected ranking
- ITF = ITF entry
- JE = Junior exempt
- w/o = Walkover
- r = Retired
- d = Defaulted
- SR = Special ranking

=== Draw ===
First round
1	(Brazil) F Ferreiro (Brazil) A Sá	w/o
(Spain) R Ramírez Hidalgo (Spain) A Ramos-Viñolas
WC	(Brazil) A Laranja (Brazil) G Wanderley	1	6	[5]
WC	(Sweden) C Lindell (Brazil) B Semenzato	6	2	[10]
4	(Brazil) R Dutra da Silva (Brazil) J Souza	6	6
(Brazil) R Hocevar (Brazil) C Zampieri	4	3
(Slovakia) I Klec (Portugal) P Sousa	7	6^{4}	[4]
(Brazil) T Alves (Brazil) J Silva	6^{1}	7	[10]
(Brazil) L Kirche (Brazil) E Ribeiro Neto	6^{5}	3
(Argentina) D Hartfield (France) É Prodon	7	6
(Chile) J Aguilar (Chile) N Massú
3	(Portugal) R Machado (Spain) D Muñoz-de la Nava	w/o
(Kazakhstan) Y Schukin (Croatia) A Veić	6	6
(France) N Devilder (France) O Patience	4	4
WC	(Brazil) M Daniel (Brazil) T Fernandes	w/o
ALT	(Spain) J Díaz (Spain) S Pérez-Pérez

Quarterfinals
1	(Brazil) F Ferreiro (Brazil) A Sá	6	6
WC	(Sweden) C Lindell (Brazil) B Semenzato	2	4
4	(Brazil) R Dutra da Silva (Brazil) J Souza	7	2	[8]
(Brazil) T Alves (Brazil) J Silva	6^{6}	6	[10]
(Argentina) D Hartfield (France) É Prodon	6	1	[8]
3	(Portugal) R Machado (Spain) D Muñoz-de la Nava	4	6	[10]
(Kazakhstan) Y Schukin (Croatia) A Veić	7	6
WC	(Brazil) M Daniel (Brazil) T Fernandes	6^{5}	1

Semifinals
1	(Brazil) F Ferreiro (Brazil) A Sá	6	6
(Brazil) T Alves (Brazil) J Silva	2	2
3	(Portugal) R Machado (Spain) D Muñoz-de la Nava	5	7	[10]
(Kazakhstan) Y Schukin (Croatia) A Veić	7	5	[6]

Final
1	(Brazil) F Ferreiro (Brazil) A Sá	3	7	[10]
3	(Portugal) R Machado (Spain) D Muñoz-de la Nava	6	6^{2}	[8]
