= 2009 Copa Petrobras São Paulo =

- Date: 26 October – 1 November
- Edition: 6th
- Location: São Paulo, Brazil

Champions

Singles
- (Brazil) Thomaz Bellucci

Doubles
- (Brazil) Franco Ferreiro / (Brazil) Ricardo Mello
← 2008 ·	Copa Petrobras São Paulo	· 2010 →

The 2009 Copa Petrobras São Paulo was a professional tennis tournament played on outdoor red clay courts. It was the sixth edition of the tournament which was part of the 2009 ATP Challenger Tour. It took place in São Paulo, Brazil between 26 October and 1 November 2009.

== ATP entrants ==
=== Seeds ===
Country	Player	Rank^{1}	Seed
BRA	Thomaz Bellucci	45	1
ARG	Juan Ignacio Chela	94	2
CHI	Paul Capdeville	95	3
ESP	Santiago Ventura	117	4
ECU	Nicolás Lapentti	122	5
POR	Rui Machado	123	6
CHI	Nicolás Massú	143	7
BRA	Thiago Alves	149	8

- Rankings are as of October 19, 2009.

=== Other entrants ===
The following players received wildcards into the singles main draw:

- (Brazil) Thiago Alves
- (Brazil) Marcelo Demoliner
- (Ecuador) Nicolás Lapentti
- (Brazil) Gabriel Wanderley

The following player received a Special Exempt into the singles main draw:

- (Argentina) Gastón Gaudio

The following players received entry from the qualifying draw:

- (Brazil) Rogério Dutra da Silva
- (Chile) Guillermo Hormazábal
- (France) Axel Michon
- (Brazil) Caio Zampieri

== Champions ==
=== Singles ===
(Brazil) Thomaz Bellucci def. (Ecuador) Nicolás Lapentti, 6–4, 6–4

=== Doubles ===
(Brazil) Franco Ferreiro / (Brazil) Ricardo Mello def. (Argentina) Diego Junqueira / (Spain) David Marrero, 6–3, 6–3
