= 2009 Copa Petrobras São Paulo – Singles =

Singles
- 2009 Copa Petrobras São Paulo

Final
- Champion: (Brazil) Thomaz Bellucci
- Runner-up: (Ecuador) Nicolás Lapentti
- Score: 6–4, 6–4

Events
| Singles | Doubles |
| ← 2008 · | Copa Petrobras São Paulo | · 2010 → |

Paul Capdeville was the defending champion, but he was eliminated by Franco Ferreiro in the second round.
Thomaz Bellucci defeated Nicolás Lapentti 6–4, 6–4 in the final match.

== Seeds ==
1. (Brazil) Thomaz Bellucci (champion)
2. (Argentina) Juan Ignacio Chela (quarterfinals)
3. (Chile) Paul Capdeville (second round)
4. (Spain) Santiago Ventura (semifinals, retired)
5. (Ecuador) Nicolás Lapentti (final)
6. (Portugal) Rui Machado (second round)
7. (Chile) Nicolás Massú (quarterfinals)
8. (Brazil) Thiago Alves (first round)

== Draw ==
=== Key ===
- Q = Qualifier
- WC = Wild card
- LL = Lucky loser
- Alt = Alternate
- SE = Special exempt
- PR = Protected ranking
- ITF = ITF entry
- JE = Junior exempt
- w/o = Walkover
- r = Retired
- d = Defaulted
- SR = Special ranking

=== Finals ===
Semifinals
1 | (Brazil) Thomaz Bellucci | 6 | 6
(Spain) David Marrero | 4 | 3
4 | (Spain) Santiago Ventura | 7 | 3 | 0^{r}
5 | (Ecuador) Nicolás Lapentti | 6^{2} | 6 | 0

Final
1 | (Brazil) Thomaz Bellucci | 6 | 6
5 | (Ecuador) Nicolás Lapentti | 4 | 4

=== Top half ===
First round
1 | (Brazil) T Bellucci | 4 | 6 | 7
(Brazil) J Souza | 6 | 2 | 5
(Mexico) S González | 1 | 6 | 6
Q | (Brazil) C Zampieri | 6 | 3 | 4
Q | (Brazil) R Dutra da Silva | 7 | 1 | 6
(Spain) P Andújar | 5 | 6 | 4
SE | (Argentina) G Gaudio | 5 | 3
7 | (Chile) N Massú | 7 | 6
3 | (Chile) P Capdeville | 6 | 6
(Argentina) J-M Aranguren | 3 | 3
SE | (France) G Rufin | 3 | 6 | 3
(Brazil) F Ferreiro | 6 | 4 | 6
(Spain) I Cervantes-Huegun | 2 | 4
(Spain) D Marrero | 6 | 6
(Brazil) R Mello | 6^{1} | 6 | 6
8 | (Brazil) T Alves | 7 | 4 | 3

Second round
1 | (Brazil) T Bellucci | 6 | 6
(Mexico) S González | 3 | 4
Q | (Brazil) R Dutra da Silva | 2 | 0
7 | (Chile) N Massú | 6 | 6
3 | (Chile) P Capdeville | 0 | 6^{5}
(Brazil) F Ferreiro | 6 | 7
(Spain) D Marrero | 7 | 6
(Brazil) R Mello | 5 | 0

Quarterfinals
1 | (Brazil) T Bellucci | 6 | 6
7 | (Chile) N Massú | 2 | 3
(Brazil) F Ferreiro | 1 | 6 | 5
(Spain) D Marrero | 6 | 3 | 7

Semifinals
1 | (Brazil) T Bellucci | 6 | 6
(Spain) D Marrero | 4 | 3

=== Bottom half ===
First round
6 | (Portugal) R Machado | 6 | 6
(Brazil) R Hocevar | 4 | 4
WC | (Brazil) M Demoliner | 1 | 6^{4}
(Brazil) J Silva | 6 | 7
(Spain) D Muñoz-De La Nava | 4 | 1
(Argentina) JP Brzezicki | 6 | 6
Q | (France) A Michon | 4 | 3
4 | (Spain) S Ventura | 6 | 6
5 | (Ecuador) N Lapentti | 6 | 4 | 6
(Argentina) D Junqueira | 4 | 6 | 4
Q | (Chile) G Hormazábal | 7 | 5 | 3
(Argentina) S Decoud | 6^{3} | 7 | 6
(France) J Dasnières de Veigy | 6 | 6
WC | (Brazil) G Wanderley | 3 | 4
(Spain) P Riba | 6 | 3 | 4
2 | (Argentina) JI Chela | 4 | 6 | 6

Second round
6 | (Portugal) R Machado | 6^{1} | 0
(Brazil) J Silva | 7 | 6
(Argentina) JP Brzezicki | 3 | 2
4 | (Spain) S Ventura | 6 | 6
5 | (Ecuador) N Lapentti | 6 | 6
(Argentina) S Decoud | 2 | 1
(France) J Dasnières de Veigy | 4 | 1
2 | (Argentina) JI Chela | 6 | 6

Quarterfinals
(Brazil) J Silva | 4 | 6 | 6^{6}
4 | (Spain) S Ventura | 6 | 3 | 7
5 | (Ecuador) N Lapentti | 6 | 5 | 6
2 | (Argentina) JI Chela | 4 | 7 | 3

Semifinals
4 | (Spain) S Ventura | 7 | 3 | 0^{r}
5 | (Ecuador) N Lapentti | 6^{2} | 6 | 0
