= 2010 Aberto de Bahia =

- Date: August 16 – August 22
- Edition: 1st
- Surface: Hard
- Location: Salvador, Brazil

Champions

Singles
- (Brazil) Ricardo Mello

Doubles
- (Brazil) Franco Ferreiro / (Brazil) André Sá
- Aberto de Bahia

The 2010 Aberto de Bahia was a professional tennis tournament played on outdoor hard courts. It was the first (and to date only) edition of the tournament which is part of the 2010 ATP Challenger Tour. It took place in Salvador, Brazil between 16 and 22 August 2010.

== ATP entrants ==
=== Seeds ===
| Nationality | Player | Ranking* | Seeding |
|---|---|---|---|
| BRA | Ricardo Mello | 83 | 1 |
| ARG | Federico Delbonis | 125 | 2 |
| FRA | David Guez | 128 | 3 |
| FRA | Josselin Ouanna | 135 | 4 |
| BRA | João Souza | 138 | 5 |
| BRA | Thiago Alves | 158 | 6 |
| BLR | Uladzimir Ignatik | 176 | 7 |
| AUS | Matthew Ebden | 184 | 8 |

- Rankings are as of August 9, 2010.

=== Other entrants ===
The following players received wildcards into the singles main draw:

- (Brazil) Guilherme Clézar
- (Brazil) Rogério Dutra da Silva
- (Brazil) Tiago Lopes
- (Brazil) Daniel Silva

The following players received entry from the qualifying draw:

- (Chinese Taipei) Chen Ti
- (Colombia) Robert Farah
- (Japan) Toshihide Matsui
- (United States) Nicholas Monroe

== Champions ==
=== Singles ===
(Brazil) Ricardo Mello def. (Brazil) Thiago Alves, 5–7, 6–4, 6–4

=== Doubles ===
(Brazil) Franco Ferreiro / (Brazil) André Sá def. (Belarus) Uladzimir Ignatik / (Slovakia) Martin Kližan, 6–2, 6–4
