= 2010 Aberto de Bahia – Singles =

Singles
- 2010 Aberto de Bahia

Final
- Champion: (Brazil) Ricardo Mello
- Runner-up: (Brazil) Thiago Alves
- Score: 5–7, 6–4, 6–4

Events
Singles	Doubles
- Aberto de Bahia

Ricardo Mello won the inaugural event, by defeating Thiago Alves 5–7, 6–4, 6–4 in the final.

== Seeds ==
1. (Brazil) Ricardo Mello (champion)
2. (Argentina) Federico del Bonis (first round)
3. (France) David Guez (quarterfinals)
4. (France) Josselin Ouanna (first round)
5. (Brazil) João Souza (first round)
6. (Brazil) Thiago Alves (final)
7. (Belarus) Uladzimir Ignatik (semifinals)
8. (Australia) Matthew Ebden (semifinals)

== Draw ==
Key

- Q = Qualifier
- WC = Wild card
- LL = Lucky loser
- Alt = Alternate
- ITF = ITF entry
- PR = Protected ranking
- SR = Special ranking
- SE = Special exempt
- JE = Junior exempt
- JR = Junior Accelerator Programme entrant
- CO = College Accelerator Programme entrant
- NG = Next Gen Accelerator Program entrant
- w/o = Walkover
- r = Retired
- d = Defaulted

=== Finals ===
Semifinals
1	(Brazil) Ricardo Mello	2	7	6
8	(Australia) Matthew Ebden	6	6^{2}	2
6	(Brazil) Thiago Alves	6	6
7	(Belarus) Uladzimir Ignatik	4	4

Final
1	(Brazil) Ricardo Mello	5	6	6
6	(Brazil) Thiago Alves	7	4	4

=== Top half ===
First round
1	(Brazil) R Mello	6	6
Q	(United States) N Monroe	1	1
Q	(Chinese Taipei) T Chen	3	6	3
(France) C-A Brezac	6	2	6
WC	(Brazil) T Lopes	6	7
(Italy) R Ghedin	4	6^{6}
(Japan) Y Sugita	0	7	6
5	(Brazil) J Souza	6	6^{5}	2
4	(France) J Ouanna	7	6
(Spain) A Menéndez-Maceiras	6^{5}	4
(Brazil) C Zampieri	6	1	6
WC	(Brazil) G Clezar	3	6	4
Q	(Colombia) R Farah	6	4	7
(Brazil) J Silva	2	6	6^{4}
Q	(Japan) T Matsui	4	4
8	(Australia) M Ebden	6	6

Second round
1	(Brazil) R Mello	6	6
(France) C-A Brezac	4	1
WC	(Brazil) T Lopes	2	1
(Japan) Y Sugita	6	6
4	(France) J Ouanna	6^{4}	6	4
(Brazil) C Zampieri	7	3	6
Q	(Colombia) R Farah	2	2
8	(Australia) M Ebden	6	6

Quarterfinals
1	(Brazil) R Mello	6	6^{5}	6
(Japan) Y Sugita	2	7	1
(Brazil) C Zampieri	2	2
8	(Australia) M Ebden	6	6

Semifinals
1	(Brazil) R Mello	2	7	6
8	(Australia) M Ebden	6	6^{2}	2

=== Bottom half ===
First round
6	(Brazil) T Alves	6	7
(Netherlands) M Middelkoop	3	6^{3}
(Colombia) JS Cabal	6	4	3
(Argentina) F Bagnis	4	6	6
(Spain) G Alcaide	6	6
WC	(Brazil) R Dutra da Silva	2	4
(Japan) T Ito	4	5
3	(France) D Guez	6	7
7	(Belarus) U Ignatik	6	1	6
(Slovakia) M Kližan	4	6	3
WC	(Brazil) D Silva	2	6^{4}
(Brazil) R Hocevar	6	7
(United Kingdom) J Baker	7	6
ALT	(Ecuador) G Lapentti	6^{2}	3
(Republic of Ireland) L Sorensen	7	6
2	(Argentina) F del Bonis	5	3

Second round
6	(Brazil) T Alves	6	7
(Argentina) F Bagnis	3	5
(Spain) G Alcaide	6^{4}	0	r
3	(France) D Guez	7	1
7	(Belarus) U Ignatik	6	6
(Brazil) R Hocevar	3	3
(United Kingdom) J Baker	4	4
(Republic of Ireland) L Sorensen	6	6

Quarterfinals
6	(Brazil) T Alves	2	6	6
3	(France) D Guez	6	2	3
7	(Belarus) U Ignatik	7	6
(Republic of Ireland) L Sorensen	5	0

Semifinals
6	(Brazil) T Alves	6	6
7	(Belarus) U Ignatik	4	4
