= 2010 Aberto de Bahia – Doubles =

Doubles
- 2010 Aberto de Bahia

Final
- Champions: (Brazil) Franco Ferreiro (Brazil) André Sá
- Runners-up: (Belarus) Uladzimir Ignatik (Slovakia) Martin Kližan
- Score: 6–2, 6–4

Events
Singles	Doubles
- Aberto de Bahia

Franco Ferreiro and André Sá won the title, after won against Uladzimir Ignatik and Martin Kližan 6–2, 6–4 in the final.

== Seeds ==
1. (Brazil) Franco Ferreiro / (Brazil) André Sá (champions)
2. (Belarus) Uladzimir Ignatik / (Slovakia) Martin Kližan (final)
3. (Brazil) Ricardo Hocevar / (Brazil) João Souza (quarterfinals)
4. (Brazil) Rogério Dutra da Silva / (Brazil) Júlio Silva (first round)

== Draw ==
Key

- Q = Qualifier
- WC = Wild card
- LL = Lucky loser
- Alt = Alternate
- ITF = ITF entry
- PR = Protected ranking
- SR = Special ranking
- SE = Special exempt
- JE = Junior exempt
- JR = Junior Accelerator Programme entrant
- CO = College Accelerator Programme entrant
- NG = Next Gen Accelerator Program entrant
- w/o = Walkover
- r = Retired
- d = Defaulted

=== Draw ===
First round
1	(Brazil) F Ferreiro (Brazil) A Sá	7	6
WC	(Brazil) G Clezar (Brazil) A Laranja	5	2
(Colombia) JS Cabal (Colombia) R Farah	2	6	[10]
(Brazil) T Alves (Brazil) M Torres	6	4	[4]
3	(Brazil) R Hocevar (Brazil) J Souza	6^{3}	6	[10]
(Spain) G Alcaide (Spain) A Menéndez-Maceiras	7	2	[5]
(France) C-A Brezac (France) V Stouff	0	6	[10]
(Argentina) F Bagnis (Argentina) F del Bonis	6	3	[8]
WC	(Brazil) L Kirche (Brazil) T Lopes	2	2
ALT	(United Kingdom) J Baker (United States) N Monroe	6	6
(Australia) M Ebden (United States) B Evans	6	6
4	(Brazil) R Dutra da Silva (Brazil) J Silva	3	3
(Ecuador) G Lapentti (Argentina) A Molteni	6	6
WC	(Brazil) V Maynard (Brazil) N Santos	2	1
(Brazil) R Guidolin (Brazil) C Zampieri	6^{1}	1
2	(Belarus) U Ignatik (Slovakia) M Kližan	7	6

Quarterfinals
1	(Brazil) F Ferreiro (Brazil) A Sá	6	7
(Colombia) JS Cabal (Colombia) R Farah	2	6^{9}
3	(Brazil) R Hocevar (Brazil) J Souza	5	4
(France) C-A Brezac (France) V Stouff	7	6
ALT	(United Kingdom) J Baker (United States) N Monroe	6	4	[7]
(Australia) M Ebden (United States) B Evans	2	6	[10]
(Ecuador) G Lapentti (Argentina) A Molteni	2	7	[8]
2	(Belarus) U Ignatik (Slovakia) M Kližan	6	6^{4}	[10]

Semifinals
1	(Brazil) F Ferreiro (Brazil) A Sá	6	6
(France) C-A Brezac (France) V Stouff	3	1
(Australia) M Ebden (United States) B Evans	4	6	[12]
2	(Belarus) U Ignatik (Slovakia) M Kližan	6	4	[14]

Finals
1	(Brazil) F Ferreiro (Brazil) A Sá	6	6
2	(Belarus) U Ignatik (Slovakia) M Kližan	2	4
