= 2010 Open Castilla y León =

- Date: August 2 – August 8
- Edition: 25th
- Location: Segovia, Spain

Champions

Singles
- (Spain) Daniel Gimeno-Traver

Doubles
- (Brazil) Thiago Alves / (Brazil) Franco Ferreiro
- Open Castilla y León

The 2010 Open Castilla y León was a professional tennis tournament played on outdoor hard courts. It was the twenty fifth edition of the tournament which was part of the Tretorn SERIE+ of the 2010 ATP Challenger Tour. It took place in Segovia, Spain between 2 and 8 August 2010.

== ATP entrants ==
=== Seeds ===
Nationality	Player	Ranking*	Seeding
ESP	Daniel Gimeno-Traver	64	1
ESP	Marcel Granollers	86	2
ESP	Rubén Ramírez Hidalgo	90	3
SUI	Stéphane Bohli	132	4
BRA	Thiago Alves	144	5
FRA	Marc Gicquel	149	6
ESP	Iván Navarro	150	7
CRO	Ivan Dodig	153	8

- Rankings are as of July 26, 2010.

=== Other entrants ===
The following players received wildcards into the singles main draw:

- (Spain) Gerard Granollers-Pujol
- (Spain) Sergio Gutiérrez-Ferrol
- (Spain) Jorge Hernando Ruano
- (Spain) Javier Martí

The following players received entry from the qualifying draw:

- (Czech Republic) Tomáš Cakl
- (United Kingdom) Chris Eaton
- (Spain) Abraham González-Jiménez
- (Sweden) Michael Ryderstedt

== Champions ==
=== Singles ===
(Spain) Daniel Gimeno-Traver def. (France) Adrian Mannarino, 6–4, 7–6(2)

=== Doubles ===
(Brazil) Thiago Alves / (Brazil) Franco Ferreiro def. (United States) Brian Battistone / (India) Harsh Mankad, 6–2, 5–7, [10–8]
