= 2009 Copa Petrobras São Paulo – Doubles =

Doubles
- 2009 Copa Petrobras São Paulo

Final
- Champions: (Brazil) Franco Ferreiro (Brazil) Ricardo Mello
- Runners-up: (Argentina) Diego Junqueira (Spain) David Marrero
- Score: 6–3, 6–3

Events
Singles	Doubles
- Copa Petrobras São Paulo

Juan-Martín Aranguren and Franco Ferreiro were the defending champions, but they chose to not compete together.
Aranguren partnered with Sebastián Decoud, but they lost to Ricardo Hocevar and João Souza in the quarterfinal.
Ferreiro decided to play with Ricardo Mello. They reached the final, when they won 6–3, 6–3, against Diego Junqueira and David Marrero.

== Seeds ==
1. (Mexico) Santiago González / (Argentina) Sebastián Prieto (first round)
2. (Poland) Tomasz Bednarek / (Poland) Mateusz Kowalczyk (first round)
3. (Brazil) Rogério Dutra da Silva / (Brazil) Júlio Silva (quarterfinals)
4. (Argentina) Diego Junqueira / (Spain) David Marrero (final)

== Draw ==
Key

- Q = Qualifier
- WC = Wild card
- LL = Lucky loser
- Alt = Alternate
- ITF = ITF entry
- PR = Protected ranking
- SR = Special ranking
- SE = Special exempt
- JE = Junior exempt
- JR = Junior Accelerator Programme entrant
- CO = College Accelerator Programme entrant
- NG = Next Gen Accelerator Program entrant
- w/o = Walkover
- r = Retired
- d = Defaulted

=== Draw ===
First round
1	(Mexico) S González (Argentina) S Prieto	3	1
(Brazil) R Hocevar (Brazil) J Souza	6	6
(Argentina) J-M Aranguren (Argentina) S Decoud	6	6
WC	(Brazil) A Meirelles (Brazil) G Wanderley	2	1
4	(Argentina) D Junqueira (Spain) D Marrero	6^{9}	6	[10]
(Spain) I Cervantes-Huegun (Spain) G Olaso	7	3	[4]
(Brazil) T Alves (Brazil) M Torres	6	6
(Portugal) R Machado (Portugal) L Tavares	2	0
(Chile) P Capdeville (Chile) N Massú	6	4	[8]
(Brazil) F Ferreiro (Brazil) R Mello	3	6	[10]
WC	(Brazil) E Gomes (Brazil) T Lopes	6^{4}	2
3	(Brazil) R Dutra da Silva (Brazil) J Silva	7	6
(Monaco) B Balleret (France) J Dasnières de Veigy	1	4
WC	(Brazil) M Demoliner (Brazil) F Romboli	6	6
(Spain) P Andújar (Spain) P Riba	6	6
2	(Poland) T Bednarek (Poland) M Kowalczyk	1	3

Quarterfinals
(Brazil) R Hocevar (Brazil) J Souza	7	7
(Argentina) J-M Aranguren (Argentina) S Decoud	5	5
4	(Argentina) D Junqueira (Spain) D Marrero	7	6
(Brazil) T Alves (Brazil) M Torres	5	3
(Brazil) F Ferreiro (Brazil) R Mello	6	6
3	(Brazil) R Dutra da Silva (Brazil) J Silva	3	2
WC	(Brazil) M Demoliner (Brazil) F Romboli	4	6	[10]
(Spain) P Andújar (Spain) P Riba	6	2	[8]

Semifinals
(Brazil) R Hocevar (Brazil) J Souza	6^{4}	3
4	(Argentina) D Junqueira (Spain) D Marrero	7	6
(Brazil) F Ferreiro (Brazil) R Mello	4	6	[11]
WC	(Brazil) M Demoliner (Brazil) F Romboli	6	3	[9]

Finals
4	(Argentina) D Junqueira (Spain) D Marrero	3	3
(Brazil) F Ferreiro (Brazil) R Mello	6	6
