= 2010 Copa Petrobras São Paulo – Singles =

Singles
- 2010 Copa Petrobras São Paulo

Final
- Champion: (Brazil) Marcos Daniel
- Runner-up: (Brazil) Thomaz Bellucci
- Score: 6–1, 3–6, 6–3

Events
Singles	Doubles
- Copa Petrobras São Paulo

Thomaz Bellucci was the defending champion, however he lost in the final to his compatriot Marcos Daniel in three sets (1–6, 6–3, 3–6).

== Seeds ==
1. (Brazil) Thomaz Bellucci (final)
2. (Spain) Rubén Ramírez Hidalgo (first round)
3. (Portugal) Rui Machado (quarterfinals)
4. (Brazil) João Souza (first round)
5. (Spain) Albert Ramos-Viñolas (first round)
6. (Chile) Nicolás Massú (second round)
7. (Kazakhstan) Yuri Schukin (quarterfinals)
8. (Spain) Daniel Muñoz-de la Nava (first round)

== Draw ==
Key

- Q = Qualifier
- WC = Wild card
- LL = Lucky loser
- Alt = Alternate
- ITF = ITF entry
- PR = Protected ranking
- SR = Special ranking
- SE = Special exempt
- JE = Junior exempt
- JR = Junior Accelerator Programme entrant
- CO = College Accelerator Programme entrant
- NG = Next Gen Accelerator Program entrant
- w/o = Walkover
- r = Retired
- d = Defaulted

=== Finals ===
Semifinals
1/WC	(Brazil) Thomaz Bellucci	4	6	6
WC	(Sweden) Christian Lindell	6	3	3
(Brazil) Marcos Daniel	6	7
Q	(France) Nicolas Devilder	4	5

Final
1/WC	(Brazil) Thomaz Bellucci	1	6	3
(Brazil) Marcos Daniel	6	3	6

=== Top half ===
First round
1/WC	(Brazil) T Bellucci	6	6
ALT	(Slovakia) I Klec	2	0
SE	(Chile) P Capdeville	6	6
(Brazil) C Zampieri	3	4
(France) É Prodon	2
(Chile) J Aguilar	0	r
(Portugal) L Tavares	6	6
8	(Spain) D Muñoz-de la Nava	4	4
4	(Brazil) J Souza	7	2	3
WC	(Sweden) C Lindell	5	6	6
(Brazil) T Alves	6	6
LL	(Brazil) E Ribeiro Neto	3	4
(Argentina) JP Brzezicki	6	4	4
Q	(France) M Teixeira	3	6	6
PR	(Argentina) D Hartfield	3	5
7	(Kazakhstan) Y Schukin	6	7

Second round
1/WC	(Brazil) T Bellucci	6	6
SE	(Chile) P Capdeville	2	4
(France) É Prodon	6	6^{5}	4
(Portugal) L Tavares	4	7	6
WC	(Sweden) C Lindell	6	6
(Brazil) T Alves	3	4
Q	(France) M Teixeira	4	1
7	(Kazakhstan) Y Schukin	6	6

Quarterfinals
1/WC	(Brazil) T Bellucci	6	6
(Portugal) L Tavares	3	3
WC	(Sweden) C Lindell	4	6	6
7	(Kazakhstan) Y Schukin	6	3	4

Semifinals
1/WC	(Brazil) T Bellucci	4	6	6
WC	(Sweden) C Lindell	6	3	3

=== Bottom half ===
First round
6	(Chile) N Massú	6	1	6
Q	(France) T Cazes-Carrère	3	6	1
(Brazil) M Daniel	6	7
Q	(Brazil) T Lopes	1	5
(Paraguay) R Delgado	2	2
(Brazil) J Silva	6	6
(France) O Patience	6	1	0
3	(Portugal) R Machado	4	6	6
5	(Spain) A Ramos-Viñolas	6	1	4
Q	(France) N Devilder	4	6	6
WC	(Brazil) T Fernandes	3	7	6
WC	(Brazil) A Meirelles	6	5	0
(Brazil) R Dutra da Silva	7	6
(Croatia) A Veić	5	4
(Brazil) R Hocevar	6	6
2	(Spain) R Ramírez Hidalgo	2	2

Second round
6	(Chile) N Massú	1	4
(Brazil) M Daniel	6	6
(Brazil) J Silva	6^{1}	6	3
3	(Portugal) R Machado	7	4	6
Q	(France) N Devilder	6	6
WC	(Brazil) T Fernandes	3	4
(Brazil) R Dutra da Silva	6	7
(Brazil) R Hocevar	3	6^{4}

Quarterfinals
(Brazil) M Daniel	6	6
3	(Portugal) R Machado	1	4
Q	(France) N Devilder	2	7	6
(Brazil) R Dutra da Silva	6	5	1

Semifinals
(Brazil) M Daniel	6	7
Q	(France) N Devilder	4	5
