= 2010 Open Castilla y León – Doubles =

Doubles
- 2010 Open Castilla y León

Final
- Champions: (Brazil) Thiago Alves; (Brazil) Franco Ferreiro
- Runners-up: (United States) Brian Battistone; (India) Harsh Mankad
- Score: 6–2, 5–7, [10–8]

Events
Singles	Doubles
- Open Castilla y León

Nicolas Mahut and Édouard Roger-Vasselin were the defending champions, but only Mahut chose to compete in the doubles competition.
He played with Marc Gicquel and they were the 3rd seed in the tournament, but lost to Brian Battistone and Harsh Mankad in the quarterfinal.
Thiago Alves and Franco Ferreiro won in the final 6–2, 5–7, [10–8], against Battistone and Mankad.

== Seeds ==
1. (Czech Republic) Leoš Friedl / (Serbia) Dušan Vemić (quarterfinals)
2. (Spain) Marcel Granollers / (Spain) Gerard Granollers Pujol (quarterfinals)
3. (France) Marc Gicquel / (France) Nicolas Mahut (quarterfinals)
4. (Spain) David Marrero / (Spain) Daniel Muñoz de la Nava (first round)

== Draw ==
Key

- Q = Qualifier
- WC = Wild card
- LL = Lucky loser
- Alt = Alternate
- ITF = ITF entry
- PR = Protected ranking
- SR = Special ranking
- SE = Special exempt
- JE = Junior exempt
- JR = Junior Accelerator Programme entrant
- CO = College Accelerator Programme entrant
- NG = Next Gen Accelerator Program entrant
- w/o = Walkover
- r = Retired
- d = Defaulted

=== Draw ===
First round

Quarterfinals

Semifinals

Finals

1
- (Czech Republic) L Friedl
- (Serbia) D Vemić
6
6

- (Belgium) N Desein
- (Belgium) Y Mertens
1
2

1
- (Czech Republic) L Friedl
- (Serbia) D Vemić
3
6^{2}

- (Spain) G Alcaide
- (Spain) R Bautista Agut
4
4

- (Spain) I Navarro
- (Spain) R Ramírez Hidalgo
6
7

- (Spain) I Navarro
- (Spain) R Ramírez Hidalgo
6
6

- (Spain) I Navarro
- (Spain) R Ramírez Hidalgo
2
2

4
- (Spain) D Marrero
1
4

- (Brazil) T Alves
- (Brazil) F Ferreiro
6
6

- (United Kingdom) C Eaton
- (New Zealand) D King-Turner
6
6

- (United Kingdom) C Eaton
- (New Zealand) D King-Turner
5
1

- (Brazil) T Alves
- (Brazil) F Ferreiro
7
6

- (Brazil) T Alves
- (Brazil) F Ferreiro
7
6

- (Russia) K Kravchuk
- (Russia) A Kudryavtsev
5
1

- (Brazil) T Alves
- (Brazil) F Ferreiro
6
5
[10]

WC
- (Spain) P Martín-Adalia
- (Spain) R Ortega Olmedo
1
1

- (United States) B Battistone
- (India) H Mankad
2
7
[8]

- (United States) B Battistone
- (India) H Mankad
6
6

- (United States) B Battistone
- (India) H Mankad
6
7

WC
- (Spain) J Hernando Ruano
- (Romania) C Voinea
3
3

3
- (France) M Gicquel
- (France) N Mahut
3
6^{6}

3
- (France) M Gicquel
- (France) N Mahut
6
6

- (United States) B Battistone
- (India) H Mankad
4
6
[10]

WC
- (Spain) D Monedero
- (Spain) Q Muñoz
4
4

- (United Kingdom) J Delgado
- (United Kingdom) J Marray
6
3
[8]

- (United Kingdom) J Delgado
- (United Kingdom) J Marray
6
6

- (United Kingdom) J Delgado
- (United Kingdom) J Marray
6
6

- (Germany) M Emmrich
- (Sweden) A Siljeström
3
4

2
- (Spain) M Granollers
- (Spain) G Granollers Pujol
4
4

2
- (Spain) M Granollers
- (Spain) G Granollers Pujol
6
6
