= 2008 Tunis Open =

- Date: 28 April – 4 May 2008
- Edition: 5th
- Category: ATP Challenger Series
- Draw: 32S / 16D
- Prize money: $125,000
- Surface: Clay / outdoor
- Location: Tunis, Tunisia

Champions

Singles
- (Brazil) Thomaz Bellucci

Doubles
- (Brazil) Thomaz Bellucci / (Brazil) Bruno Soares
← 2007 ·	Tunis Open	· 2009 →

The 2008 Tunis Open was a 2008 ATP Challenger Series men's tennis tournament played on outdoor clay courts and held from 28 April through 4 May 2008. Thomaz Bellucci won the singles tournament.

== Champions ==
=== Singles ===
(Brazil) Thomaz Bellucci defeated (Serbia) Dušan Vemić, 6–2, 6–4

=== Doubles ===
(Brazil) Thomaz Bellucci / (Brazil) Bruno Soares defeated (Switzerland) Jean-Claude Scherrer / (France) Nicolas Tourte, 6–3, 6–4
