= 2010 Open Castilla y León – Singles =

Singles
- 2010 Open Castilla y León

Final
- Champion: (Spain) Daniel Gimeno Traver
- Runner-up: (France) Adrian Mannarino
- Score: 6–4, 7–6(2)

Events
Singles	Doubles
- Open Castilla y León

Feliciano López won the previous year's edition, but decided not to participate in 2010.
Daniel Gimeno Traver defeated Adrian Mannarino 6–4, 7–6(2) in the final.

== Seeds ==
1. (Spain) Daniel Gimeno Traver (champion)
2. (Spain) Marcel Granollers (first round)
3. (Spain) Rubén Ramírez Hidalgo (first round)
4. (Switzerland) Stéphane Bohli (second round)
5. (Brazil) Thiago Alves (second round)
6. (France) Marc Gicquel (first round)
7. (Spain) Iván Navarro (second round)
8. (Croatia) Ivan Dodig (first round)

== Draw ==
Key

- Q = Qualifier
- WC = Wild card
- LL = Lucky loser
- Alt = Alternate
- ITF = ITF entry
- PR = Protected ranking
- SR = Special ranking
- SE = Special exempt
- JE = Junior exempt
- JR = Junior Accelerator Programme entrant
- CO = College Accelerator Programme entrant
- NG = Next Gen Accelerator Program entrant
- w/o = Walkover
- r = Retired
- d = Defaulted

=== Finals ===
Semifinals
1	(Spain) Daniel Gimeno Traver	7	6
(France) Vincent Millot	5	4
PR	(France) Adrian Mannarino	6	6
(Netherlands) Jesse Huta Galung	3	4

Final
1	(Spain) Daniel Gimeno Traver	6	7
PR	(France) Adrian Mannarino	4	6^{2}

=== Top half ===
First round
1	(Spain) D Gimeno Traver	6^{11}	6	7
(Spain) G Alcaide	7	3	6^{4}
(Spain) P Clar-Rosselló	6^{4}	4
(Russia) K Kravchuk	7	6
Q	(United Kingdom) C Eaton	6	6^{1}	2
(Belgium) Y Mertens	4	7	6
(Belgium) N Desein	2	6^{7}
7	(Spain) I Navarro	6	7
4	(Switzerland) S Bohli	6	6
WC	(Spain) S Gutiérrez-Ferrol	1	2
WC	(Spain) G Granollers Pujol	3	6	2
(France) V Millot	6	3	6
Q	(Czech Republic) T Cakl	2	6	6^{0}
ALT	(Spain) D Marrero	6	1	7
(France) N Mahut	6	6
6	(France) M Gicquel	3	2

Second round
1	(Spain) D Gimeno Traver	7	7
(Russia) K Kravchuk	6^{4}	6^{5}
(Belgium) Y Mertens	7	3	6
7	(Spain) I Navarro	6^{3}	6	3
4	(Switzerland) S Bohli	4	6	3
(France) V Millot	6	4	6
ALT	(Spain) D Marrero	6^{4}	3
(France) N Mahut	7	6

Quarterfinals
1	(Spain) D Gimeno Traver	7	6
(Belgium) Y Mertens	6^{5}	3
(France) V Millot	6	6^{7}	6
(France) N Mahut	4	7	0

Semifinals
1	(Spain) D Gimeno Traver	7	6
(France) V Millot	5	4

=== Bottom half ===
First round
8	(Croatia) I Dodig	2	4
PR	(France) A Mannarino	6	6
(Republic of Ireland) L Sorensen	7	6^{6}	6
Q	(Spain) A González-Jiménez	6^{2}	7	2
(Spain) A Menéndez Maceiras	6	3	6
WC	(Spain) J Martí	2	6	3
(Russia) A Kudryavtsev	7	7
3	(Spain) R Ramírez Hidalgo	6^{3}	5
5	(Brazil) T Alves	6	7
WC	(Spain) J Hernando Ruano	3	6^{3}
Q	(Sweden) M Ryderstedt	4	1
(Spain) R Bautista Agut	6	6
(New Zealand) D King-Turner	4	3
(Spain) D Muñoz de la Nava	6	6
(Netherlands) J Huta Galung	6	7
2	(Spain) M Granollers	4	6^{5}

Second round
PR	(France) A Mannarino	7	3	4
(Republic of Ireland) L Sorensen	5	6	3^{r}
(Spain) A Menéndez Maceiras	3	5
(Russia) A Kudryavtsev	6	7
5	(Brazil) T Alves	6	3	4
(Spain) R Bautista Agut	4	6	6
(Spain) D Muñoz de la Nava	5	6^{3}
(Netherlands) J Huta Galung	7	7

Quarterfinals
PR	(France) A Mannarino	6	4	6
(Russia) A Kudryavtsev	1	6	2
(Spain) R Bautista Agut	5	6	3
(Netherlands) J Huta Galung	7	3	6

Semifinals
PR	(France) A Mannarino	6	6
(Netherlands) J Huta Galung	3	4
