= 2017 U.S. Men's Clay Court Championships – Doubles =

Doubles
- 2017 U.S. Men's Clay Court Championships

Final
- Champions: (Chile) Julio Peralta (Argentina) Horacio Zeballos
- Runners-up: (Germany) Dustin Brown (United States) Frances Tiafoe
- Score: 4–6, 7–5, [10–6]

Details
- Draw: 16
- Seeds: 4

Events
Singles	Doubles
- U.S. Men's Clay Court Championships

Bob and Mike Bryan were the defending champions, but lost in the semifinals to Julio Peralta and Horacio Zeballos.

Peralta and Zeballos went on to win the title, defeating Dustin Brown and Frances Tiafoe in the final, 4–6, 7–5, [10–6].

== Seeds ==
1. (United States) Bob Bryan / (United States) Mike Bryan (semifinals)
2. (Colombia) Juan Sebastián Cabal / (Colombia) Robert Farah (first round)
3. (United States) Brian Baker / (Croatia) Nikola Mektić (withdrew)
4. (Chile) Julio Peralta / (Argentina) Horacio Zeballos (champions)

== Draw ==
Key

- Q = Qualifier
- WC = Wild card
- LL = Lucky loser
- Alt = Alternate
- ITF = ITF entry
- PR = Protected ranking
- SR = Special ranking
- SE = Special exempt
- JE = Junior exempt
- JR = Junior Accelerator Programme entrant
- CO = College Accelerator Programme entrant
- NG = Next Gen Accelerator Program entrant
- w/o = Walkover
- r = Retired
- d = Defaulted

=== Draw ===
First round
1	(United States) B Bryan (United States) M Bryan	6	6
(India) L Paes (Brazil) A Sá	0	4
(India) J Nedunchezhiyan (United States) D Young	7^{7}	5	[6]
(India) P Raja (India) D Sharan	6^{5}	7	[10]
4	(Chile) J Peralta (Argentina) H Zeballos	7	6
WC	(Argentina) M González (Argentina) J Mónaco	5	3
(Mexico) S González (New Zealand) M Venus	7^{7}	4	[10]
(United States) N Monroe (New Zealand) A Sitak	6^{3}	6	[7]
(Austria) O Marach (Austria) T-S Weissborn	4	7	[7]
(United States) J Cerretani (Austria) P Oswald	6	5	[10]
(South Africa) K Anderson (United States) S Querrey	6	6
Alt	(United States) J Donaldson (Brazil) T Monteiro	2	3
(Sweden) R Lindstedt (United States) S Lipsky	4	6	[6]
(Brazil) R Dutra Silva (Canada) A Shamasdin	6	3	[10]
WC	(Germany) D Brown (United States) F Tiafoe	6	6^{5}	[10]
2	(Colombia) JS Cabal (Colombia) R Farah	3	7^{7}	[5]

Quarterfinals
1	(United States) B Bryan (United States) M Bryan	6	6
(India) P Raja (India) D Sharan	3	4
4	(Chile) J Peralta (Argentina) H Zeballos	6	7^{7}
(Mexico) S González (New Zealand) M Venus	3	6^{4}
(United States) J Cerretani (Austria) P Oswald	5	6	[8]
(South Africa) K Anderson (United States) S Querrey	7	3	[10]
(Brazil) R Dutra Silva (Canada) A Shamasdin	6	1	[5]
WC	(Germany) D Brown (United States) F Tiafoe	4	6	[10]

Semifinals
1	(United States) B Bryan (United States) M Bryan	6	4	[8]
4	(Chile) J Peralta (Argentina) H Zeballos	3	6	[10]
(South Africa) K Anderson (United States) S Querrey	4	4
WC	(Germany) D Brown (United States) F Tiafoe	6	6

Final
4	(Chile) J Peralta (Argentina) H Zeballos	4	7	[10]
WC	(Germany) D Brown (United States) F Tiafoe	6	5	[6]
