= 2008 Tunis Open – Singles =

Tennis tournament in Tunisia

Singles
- 2008 Tunis Open

Final
- Champion: (Brazil) Thomaz Bellucci
- Runner-up: (Serbia) Dušan Vemić
- Score: 6–2, 6–4

Events
Singles	Doubles
- Tunis Open

The 2008 Tunis Open was a 2008 ATP Challenger Series tennis tournament. Thomaz Bellucci won the singles tournament.

== Seeds ==
1. (France) Julien Benneteau (quarterfinals)
2. (France) Florent Serra (semifinals)
3. (Serbia) Boris Pašanski (second round)
4. (Chile) Paul Capdeville (quarterfinals)
5. (Chile) Nicolás Massú (semifinals)
6. (France) Édouard Roger-Vasselin (second round)
7. (France) Olivier Patience (first round)
8. (Brazil) Thomaz Bellucci (champion)

== Draw ==
Key

- Q = Qualifier
- WC = Wild card
- LL = Lucky loser
- Alt = Alternate
- ITF = ITF entry
- PR = Protected ranking
- SR = Special ranking
- SE = Special exempt
- JE = Junior exempt
- JR = Junior Accelerator Programme entrant
- CO = College Accelerator Programme entrant
- NG = Next Gen Accelerator Program entrant
- w/o = Walkover
- r = Retired
- d = Defaulted

=== Final four ===
Semifinals
5	(Chile) Nicolás Massú	4	2
8	(Brazil) Thomaz Bellucci	6	6
(Serbia) Dušan Vemić	6	6
2	(France) Florent Serra	4	4

Final
8	(Brazil) Thomaz Bellucci	6	6
(Serbia) Dušan Vemić	2	4

=== Section 1 ===
First round
1	(France) J Benneteau	7^{7}	6
(Slovakia) D Hrbatý	6^{3}	4
(France) J Ouanna	2	3
(Germany) T Kamke	6	6
(Romania) C Gârd	6	6
(Russia) M Elgin	3	1
WC	(Tunisia) M Jaziri	6^{1}	0
5	(Chile) N Massú	7^{7}	6
4	(Chile) P Capdeville	7^{7}	7^{7}
Q	(Czech Republic) Adam Vejmělka	6^{4}	6^{4}
(Spain) F Vicente	4	7	6
(Ukraine) I Sergeyev	6	5	4
WC	(Netherlands) M Verkerk	7^{7}	7^{7}
Q	(France) S de Chaunac	6^{4}	6^{5}
8	(Brazil) T Bellucci	6	6^{4}	6
(Germany) A Beck	0	7^{7}	3

Second round
1	(France) J Benneteau	6	4	7^{7}
(Germany) T Kamke	3	6	6^{3}
(Romania) C Gârd	0	2
5	(Chile) N Massú	6	6
4	(Chile) P Capdeville	6	5	6
(Spain) F Vicente	2	7	4
WC	(Netherlands) M Verkerk	3	3
8	(Brazil) T Bellucci	6	6

Quarterfinals
1	(France) J Benneteau	4	2
5	(Chile) N Massú	6	6
4	(Chile) P Capdeville	3	4
8	(Brazil) T Bellucci	6	6

Semifinals
5	(Chile) N Massú	2	4
8	(Brazil) T Bellucci	6	6

=== Section 2 ===
First round
7	(France) O Patience	6	3	6^{4}
(Serbia) D Vemić	4	6	7^{7}
Q	(France) M Montcourt	6^{6}	1
(Spain) D Muñoz-De La Nava	7^{7}	6
(Tunisia) W Jallali	1	2
(Portugal) F Gil	6	6
WC	(Tunisia) Wael Kilani	3	3
3	(Serbia) B Pašanski	6	6
6	(France) É Roger-Vasselin	6	6
(Slovakia) L Lacko	1	3
(Spain) M Fornell	3	6	6
Q	(Portugal) R Machado	6	4	3
(Australia) J Sirianni	6^{5}	5
(Serbia) I Bozoljac	7^{7}	7
(Spain) P Andújar	5	6	3
2	(France) F Serra	7	3	6

Second round
(Serbia) D Vemić	3	7^{9}	6
(Spain) D Muñoz-De La Nava	6	6^{7}	3
(Portugal) F Gil	7	6
3	(Serbia) B Pašanski	5	4
6	(France) É Roger-Vasselin	1	7^{8}	3
(Spain) M Fornell	6	6^{6}	6
(Serbia) I Bozoljac	5	6^{4}
2	(France) F Serra	7	7^{7}

Quarterfinals
(Serbia) D Vemić	6^{4}	7^{7}	6
(Portugal) F Gil	7^{7}	6^{3}	4
(Spain) M Fornell	1	4
2	(France) F Serra	6	6

Semifinals
(Serbia) D Vemić	6	6
2	(France) F Serra	4	4
