= 2010 Copa Petrobras São Paulo =

- Date: 25–31 October
- Edition: 7th
- Location: São Paulo, Brazil

Champions

Singles
- (Brazil) Marcos Daniel

Doubles
- (Brazil) Franco Ferreiro / (Brazil) André Sá
- Copa Petrobras São Paulo

The 2010 Copa Petrobras São Paulo was a professional tennis tournament played on outdoor red clay courts. It was the seventh edition of the tournament which is part of the 2010 ATP Challenger Tour. It took place in São Paulo, Brazil between 25 and 31 October 2010.

== ATP entrants ==
=== Seeds ===
| Country | Player | Rank^{1} | Seed |
|---|---|---|---|
| BRA | Thomaz Bellucci | 27 | 1 |
| ESP | Rubén Ramírez Hidalgo | 86 | 2 |
| POR | Rui Machado | 106 | 3 |
| BRA | João Souza | 107 | 4 |
| ESP | Albert Ramos-Viñolas | 123 | 5 |
| CHI | Nicolás Massú | 125 | 6 |
| KAZ | Yuri Schukin | 127 | 7 |
| ESP | Daniel Muñoz de la Nava | 134 | 8 |

- Rankings are as of October 18, 2010.

=== Other entrants ===
The following players received wildcards into the singles main draw:

- (Brazil) Thomaz Bellucci
- (Brazil) Tiago Fernandes
- (Sweden) Christian Lindell
- (Brazil) Augusto Meirelles

The following players received a special entry into the singles main draw:

- (Chile) Paul Capdeville

The following players received entry from the qualifying draw:

- (France) Thomas Cazes-Carrère
- (France) Nicolas Devilder
- (Brazil) Tiago Lopes
- (France) Maxime Teixeira

The following player received entry as a Lucky loser into the singles main draw:

- (Brazil) Eládio Ribeiro Neto

== Champions ==
=== Singles ===
(Brazil) Marcos Daniel def. (Brazil) Thomaz Bellucci, 6–1, 3–6, 6–3

=== Doubles ===
(Brazil) Franco Ferreiro / (Brazil) André Sá def. (Portugal) Rui Machado / (Spain) Daniel Muñoz de la Nava, 3–6, 7–6(2), [10–8]
