= 2008 Tunis Open – Doubles =

Doubles
- 2008 Tunis Open

Final
- Champions: (Brazil) Thomaz Bellucci (Brazil) Bruno Soares
- Runners-up: (Switzerland) Jean-Claude Scherrer (France) Nicolas Tourte
- Score: 6–3, 6–4

Events
Singles	Doubles
- Tunis Open

The 2008 Tunis Open was a 2008 ATP Challenger Series tennis tournament.

== Seeds ==
1. (Sweden) Johan Brunström / (United States) James Cerretani (semifinals)
2. (Brazil) Thomaz Bellucci / (Brazil) Bruno Soares (champions)
3. (Italy) Fabio Colangelo / (Italy) Alessandro Motti (quarterfinals)
4. (United Kingdom) Jamie Delgado / (Portugal) Frederico Gil (semifinals)

== Draw ==
Key

- Q = Qualifier
- WC = Wild card
- LL = Lucky loser
- Alt = Alternate
- ITF = ITF entry
- PR = Protected ranking
- SR = Special ranking
- SE = Special exempt
- JE = Junior exempt
- JR = Junior Accelerator Programme entrant
- CO = College Accelerator Programme entrant
- NG = Next Gen Accelerator Program entrant
- w/o = Walkover
- r = Retired
- d = Defaulted

=== Final four ===
First round
1	(Sweden) J Brunström (United States) J Cerretani	4	7	[10]
(Spain) M Fornell (Spain) F Vicente	6	5	[7]
(Slovakia) L Lacko (Brazil) M Torres	6	2	[7]
(Spain) P Andújar (Spain) D Muñoz-De La Nava	4	6	[10]
3	(Italy) F Colangelo (Italy) A Motti	6	7
Alt	(Russia) M Elgin (Ukraine) I Sergeyev	3	5
(Switzerland) J-C Scherrer (France) N Tourte	6	6
(Germany) A Beck (Germany) T Kamke	2	4
(France) M Montcourt (Serbia) B Pašanski	6	6
(Germany) F Moser (Australia) J Sirianni	4	1
WC	(Tunisia) Wael Kilani (Tunisia) Fares Zaier	4	1
4	(United Kingdom) J Delgado (Portugal) F Gil	6	6
WC	(Serbia) I Bozoljac (Serbia) D Vemić	7^{7}	4	[10]
(Chile) P Capdeville (Netherlands Antilles) JJ Rojer	6^{0}	6	[6]
WC	(Tunisia) W Jallali (Tunisia) M Jaziri	1	4
2	(Brazil) T Bellucci (Brazil) B Soares	6	6

Quarterfinals
1	(Sweden) J Brunström (United States) J Cerretani	6	7^{13}
(Spain) P Andújar (Spain) D Muñoz-De La Nava	4	6^{11}
3	(Italy) F Colangelo (Italy) A Motti	4	2
(Switzerland) J-C Scherrer (France) N Tourte	6	6
(France) M Montcourt (Serbia) B Pašanski	4	5
4	(United Kingdom) J Delgado (Portugal) F Gil	6	7
WC	(Serbia) I Bozoljac (Serbia) D Vemić	4	4
2	(Brazil) T Bellucci (Brazil) B Soares	6	6

Semifinals
1	(Sweden) J Brunström (United States) J Cerretani	3	7^{7}	[10]
(Switzerland) J-C Scherrer (France) N Tourte	6	6^{5}	[5]
4	(United Kingdom) J Delgado (Portugal) F Gil	6	3	[5]
2	(Brazil) T Bellucci (Brazil) B Soares	1	6	[10]

Finals
(Switzerland) J-C Scherrer (France) N Tourte	3	4
2	(Brazil) T Bellucci (Brazil) B Soares	6	6
