= 2017 U.S. Men's Clay Court Championships =

- Date: April 10–16
- Edition: 49th
- Category: World Tour 250
- Draw: 28S/16D
- Prize money: $535,625
- Surface: Clay / outdoor
- Location: Houston, Texas, United States
- Venue: River Oaks Country Club

Champions

Singles
- (United States) Steve Johnson

Doubles
- (Chile) Julio Peralta / (Argentina) Horacio Zeballos
- U.S. Men's Clay Court Championships

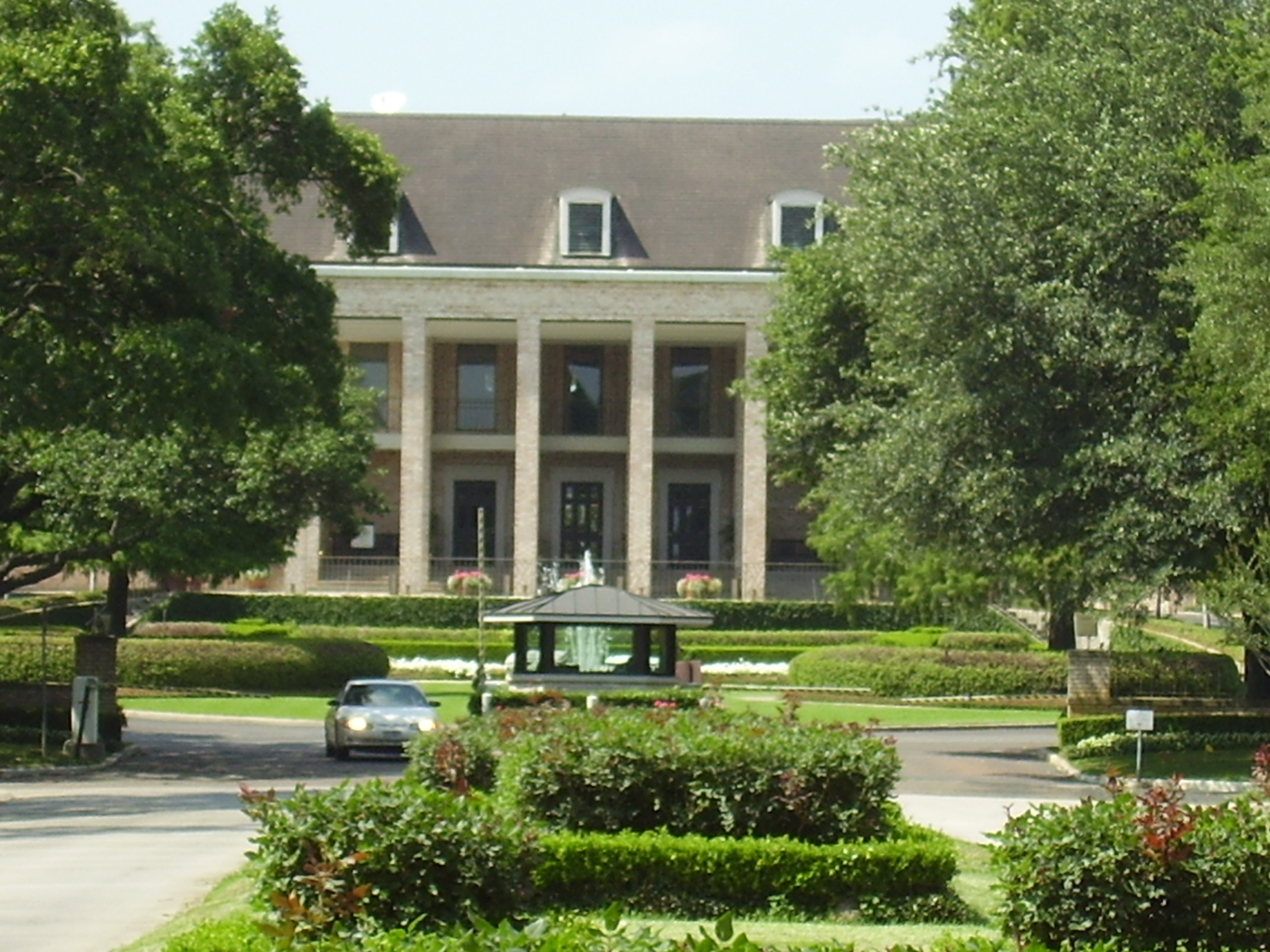
River Oaks Country Club

The 2017 U.S. Men's Clay Court Championships (also known as the Fayez Sarofim & Co. U.S. Men's Clay Court Championships for sponsorship purposes) was a tennis tournament played on outdoor clay courts. It was 49th edition of the U.S. Men's Clay Court Championships, and an ATP World Tour 250 event on the 2017 ATP World Tour. It took place at River Oaks Country Club in Houston, Texas, United States, from April 10 through April 16, 2017. Fourth-seeded Steve Johnson won the singles title.

== Finals ==
=== Singles ===
(United States) Steve Johnson defeated (Brazil) Thomaz Bellucci, 6–4, 4–6, 7–6^{(7–5)}

- It was Johnson's only singles title of the year and the 2nd of his career.

=== Doubles ===
(Chile) Julio Peralta / (Argentina) Horacio Zeballos defeated (Germany) Dustin Brown / (United States) Frances Tiafoe, 4–6, 7–5, [10–6]

== Singles main-draw entrants ==
=== Seeds ===
Country	Player	Rank^{1}	Seed
USA	Jack Sock	15	1
USA	John Isner	23	2
USA	Sam Querrey	25	3
USA	Steve Johnson	29	4
ESP	Fernando Verdasco	31	5
ESP	Feliciano López	36	6
USA	Donald Young	42	7
BRA	Thomaz Bellucci	67	8

- Rankings are as of April 3, 2017.

=== Other entrants ===
The following players received wildcards into the main draw:

- (United States) Ernesto Escobedo
- (United States) Bjorn Fratangelo
- (United States) Reilly Opelka

The following player using a protected ranking into the singles main draw:

- (Germany) Tommy Haas

The following players received entry via the qualifying draw:

- (Argentina) Máximo González
- (Argentina) Leonardo Mayer
- (United States) Noah Rubin
- (United States) Tennys Sandgren

=== Withdrawals ===
Before the tournament

- (France) Adrian Mannarino → replaced by (Argentina) Nicolás Kicker

=== Retirements ===
- (United States) Noah Rubin

== Doubles main-draw entrants ==
=== Seeds ===
Country	Player	Country	Player	Rank^{1}	Seed
USA	Bob Bryan	USA	Mike Bryan	6	1
COL	Juan Sebastián Cabal	COL	Robert Farah	64	2
~~USA~~	~~Brian Baker~~	~~CRO~~	~~Nikola Mektić~~	~~90~~	~~3~~
CHI	Julio Peralta	ARG	Horacio Zeballos	94	4

- Rankings are as of April 3, 2017.

=== Other entrants ===
The following pairs received wildcards into the doubles main draw:

- (Germany) Dustin Brown / (United States) Frances Tiafoe
- (Argentina) Máximo González / (Argentina) Juan Mónaco

The following pair received entry as alternates:

- (United States) Jared Donaldson / (Brazil) Thiago Monteiro

=== Withdrawals ===
Before the tournament

- (United States) Brian Baker
