= 2017 U.S. Men's Clay Court Championships – Singles =

Singles
- 2017 U.S. Men's Clay Court Championships

Final
- Champion: (United States) Steve Johnson
- Runner-up: (Brazil) Thomaz Bellucci
- Score: 6–4, 4–6, 7–6^{(7–5)}

Details
- Draw: 28 (4 Q / 3 WC )
- Seeds: 8

Events
Singles	Doubles
- U.S. Men's Clay Court Championships

Juan Mónaco was the defending champion, but lost in the first round to Dustin Brown.

Steve Johnson won the title, defeating Thomaz Bellucci in the final, 6–4, 4–6, 7–6^{(7–5)}.

== Seeds ==
The top four seeds receive a bye into the second round.

1. (United States) Jack Sock (semifinals)
2. (United States) John Isner (quarterfinals)
3. (United States) Sam Querrey (quarterfinals)
4. (United States) Steve Johnson (champion)
5. (Spain) Fernando Verdasco (quarterfinals)
6. (Spain) Feliciano López (quarterfinals)
7. (United States) Donald Young (first round)
8. (Brazil) Thomaz Bellucci (final)

== Draw ==
Key

- Q = Qualifier
- WC = Wild card
- LL = Lucky loser
- Alt = Alternate
- ITF = ITF entry
- PR = Protected ranking
- SR = Special ranking
- SE = Special exempt
- JE = Junior exempt
- JR = Junior Accelerator Programme entrant
- CO = College Accelerator Programme entrant
- NG = Next Gen Accelerator Program entrant
- w/o = Walkover
- r = Retired
- d = Defaulted

=== Finals ===
Semifinals
1	(United States) Jack Sock	6	4	3
4	(United States) Steve Johnson	4	6	6
8	(Brazil) Thomaz Bellucci	5	6	6
WC	(United States) Ernesto Escobedo	7	4	2

Final
4	(United States) Steve Johnson	6	4	7^{7}
8	(Brazil) Thomaz Bellucci	4	6	6^{5}

=== Top half ===
First round
WC	(United States) R Opelka	6^{5}	6	3
PR	(Germany) T Haas	7^{7}	4	6
(South Korea) H Chung	6	5	6
(Dominican Republic) V Estrella Burgos	4	7	4
WC	(United States) B Fratangelo	5	4
6	(Spain) F López	7	6
(Argentina) J Mónaco	6^{7}	3
(Germany) D Brown	7^{9}	6
(Argentina) N Kicker	5
Q	(United States) N Rubin	3^{r}
(South Africa) K Anderson	6^{4}	6^{4}
5	(Spain) F Verdasco	7^{7}	7^{7}

Second round
1	(United States) J Sock	6	3	6
PR	(Germany) T Haas	4	6	3
(South Korea) H Chung	6	2	1
6	(Spain) F López	4	6	6
4	(United States) S Johnson	7^{14}	6
(Germany) D Brown	6^{12}	4
(Argentina) N Kicker	6^{4}	1
5	(Spain) F Verdasco	7^{7}	6

Quarterfinals
1	(United States) J Sock	7^{8}	1	6
6	(Spain) F López	6^{6}	6	4
4	(United States) S Johnson	6	6
5	(Spain) F Verdasco	2	4

Semifinals
1	(United States) J Sock	6	4	3
4	(United States) S Johnson	4	6	6

=== Bottom half ===
First round
8	(Brazil) T Bellucci	7	1	6
(United States) F Tiafoe	5	6	2
(United States) J Donaldson	4	7	3
Q	(Argentina) M González	6	5	6
(Argentina) H Zeballos	6	7
(Brazil) R Dutra Silva	2	5
7	(United States) D Young	3	4
(Brazil) T Monteiro	6	6
WC	(United States) E Escobedo	6	6
Q	(United States) T Sandgren	3	3
Q	(Argentina) L Mayer	5	6	6
(Czech Republic) A Pavlásek	7	2	1

Second round
8	(Brazil) T Bellucci	2	7^{7}	6
Q	(Argentina) M González	6	6^{5}	2
(Argentina) H Zeballos	4	4
3	(United States) S Querrey	6	6
(Brazil) T Monteiro	6	4	4
WC	(United States) E Escobedo	4	6	6
Q	(Argentina) L Mayer	7^{7}	6^{3}	3
2	(United States) J Isner	6^{5}	7^{7}	6

Quarterfinals
8	(Brazil) T Bellucci	6	3	6
3	(United States) S Querrey	4	6	3
WC	(United States) E Escobedo	7^{8}	6^{6}	7^{7}
2	(United States) J Isner	6^{6}	7^{8}	6^{5}

Semifinals
8	(Brazil) T Bellucci	5	6	6
WC	(United States) E Escobedo	7	4	2

== Qualifying ==
=== Seeds ===
1. (Argentina) Renzo Olivo (first round, retired)
2. (Argentina) Guido Andreozzi (first round)
3. (Canada) Peter Polansky (first round)
4. (United States) Denis Kudla (qualifying competition)
5. (Argentina) Leonardo Mayer (qualified)
6. (Spain) Rubén Ramírez Hidalgo (first round)
7. (Argentina) Máximo González (qualified)
8. (United States) Tennys Sandgren (qualified)

=== Qualifiers ===
1. (United States) Noah Rubin
2. (Argentina) Máximo González
3. (United States) Tennys Sandgren
4. (Argentina) Leonardo Mayer

=== Qualifying draw ===
==== First qualifier ====
First round
1	(Argentina) Renzo Olivo	6	5	0^{r}
WC	(United States) Bradley Klahn	4	7	4
(United States) Noah Rubin	7^{7}	7
6	(Spain) Rubén Ramírez Hidalgo	6^{3}	5

Qualifying competition
WC	(United States) Bradley Klahn	2	6	6^{2}
(United States) Noah Rubin	6	3	7^{7}

==== Second qualifier ====
First round
2	(Argentina) Guido Andreozzi	0	5
(Germany) Benjamin Becker	6	7
(United States) Dennis Novikov	4	6^{13}
7	(Argentina) Máximo González	6	7^{15}

Qualifying competition
(Germany) Benjamin Becker	3	2
7	(Argentina) Máximo González	6	6

==== Third qualifier ====
First round
3	(Canada) Peter Polansky	2	6^{5}
(Russia) Teymuraz Gabashvili	6	7^{7}
(Canada) Steven Diez	3	3
8	(United States) Tennys Sandgren	6	6

Qualifying competition
(Russia) Teymuraz Gabashvili	3	2
8	(United States) Tennys Sandgren	6	6

==== Fourth qualifier ====
First round
4	(United States) Denis Kudla	2
WC	(United States) Brian Baker	3^{r}
(United States) Tim Smyczek	6	4	6^{3}
5	(Argentina) Leonardo Mayer	3	6	7^{7}

Qualifying competition
4	(United States) Denis Kudla	6	4	4
5	(Argentina) Leonardo Mayer	3	6	6
