= Aberto de Bahia =

- 2010 Aberto de Bahia

Defunct tennis tournament
- Location: Salvador; Brazil
- Venue: Bahia Plaza Resort
- Category: ATP Challenger Tour
- Surface: Hard / Outdoors
- Draw: 32S/32Q/16D
- Prize money: €35,000+H

The Aberto de Bahia was a tennis tournament held in Busca Vida near Salvador, Brazil in 2010. The event was part of the ATP Challenger Tour and was played on outdoor hard courts.

== Past finals ==
=== Singles ===
Year	Champion	Runner-up	Score
2010	(Brazil) Ricardo Mello	(Brazil) Thiago Alves	5–7, 6–4, 6–4

=== Doubles ===
Year	Champions	Runners-up	Score
2010	(Brazil) Franco Ferreiro (Brazil) André Sá	(Belarus) Uladzimir Ignatik (Slovakia) Martin Kližan	6–2, 6–4
