= Thomaz Bellucci =

Brazilian tennis player (born 1987)

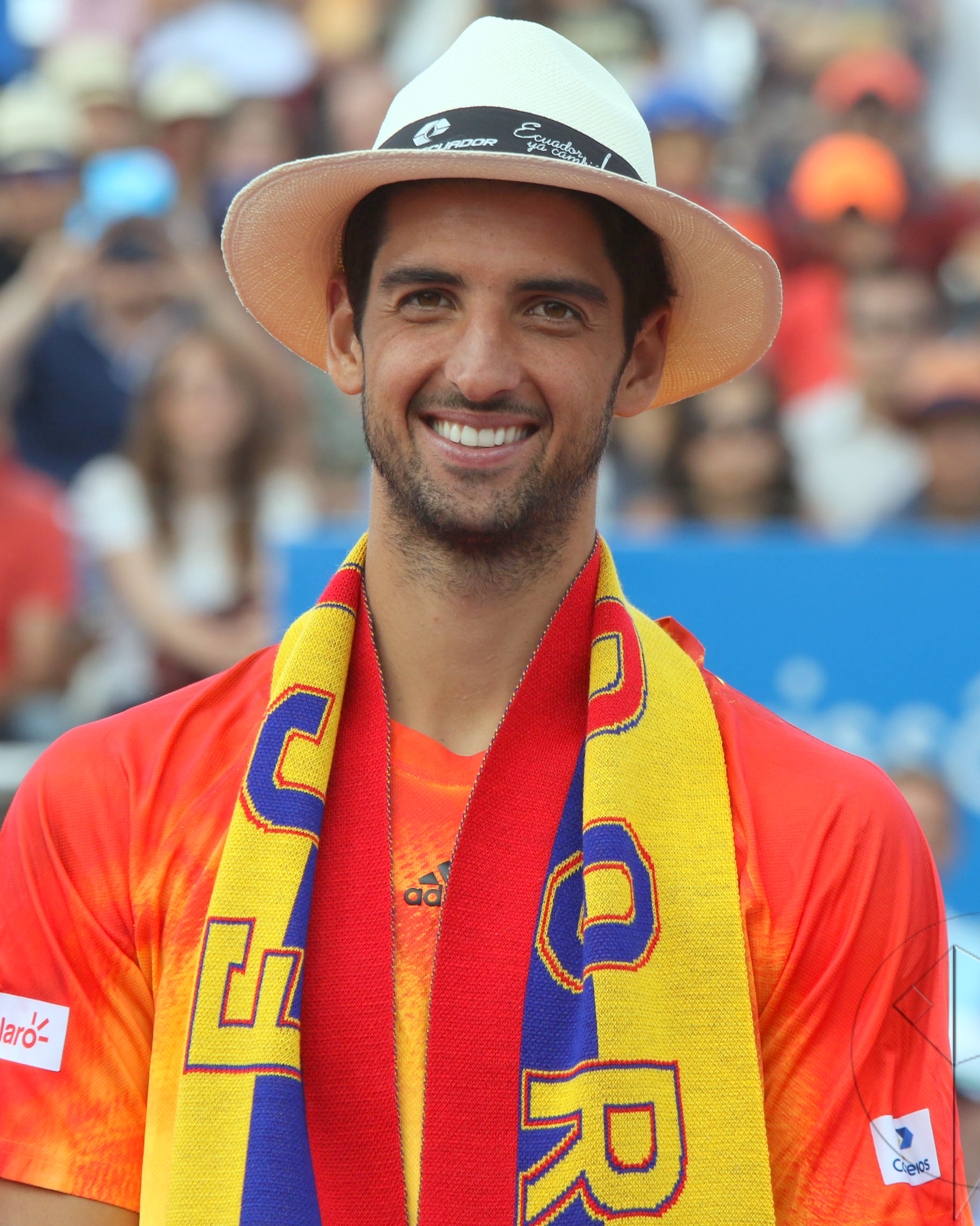
- Bellucci at the 2016 Ecuador Open Quito Final
- Country (sports): Brazil
- Residence: São Paulo, Brazil
- Born: 30 December 1987 (age 38) Tietê, Brazil
- Height: 1.88 m (6 ft 2 in)
- Turned pro: 2005
- Retired: 22 February 2023
- Plays: Left-handed (two-handed backhand)
- Coach: Germán López; Thiago Alves
- Prize money: $ 5,384,637

Singles
- Career record: 200–218
- Career titles: 4
- Highest ranking: No. 21 (26 July 2010)

Grand Slam singles results
- Australian Open: 2R (2010, 2011, 2012, 2014, 2016)
- French Open: 4R (2010)
- Wimbledon: 3R (2010)
- US Open: 3R (2015)

Other tournaments
- Olympic Games: QF (2016)

Doubles
- Career record: 63–83
- Career titles: 1
- Highest ranking: No. 70 (15 July 2013)

Grand Slam doubles results
- Australian Open: QF (2013)
- French Open: 1R (2015, 2016, 2017)
- Wimbledon: 2R (2015)
- US Open: 3R (2016)

Other doubles tournaments
- Olympic Games: 2R (2016)

Grand Slam mixed doubles results
- French Open: SF (2011)

Thomaz Cocchiarali Bellucci (born 30 December 1987, in Tietê) is a Brazilian former professional tennis player. He achieved a career-high singles ranking of World No. 21 in July 2010.

Bellucci used a string of ATP Challenger Tour victories early in 2008 to break into the top 100 rankings of the ATP World Tour as a 20-year-old. He has won 4 ATP Tour titles (the 2009 and 2012 Swiss Open, the 2010 Movistar Open and the 2015 Geneva Open), reached the quarterfinals at the 2016 Olympics and reached the semi-finals of the 2011 Madrid Masters.

== Playing style ==
Thomaz's playing style relies on using the heavy topspin of his forehand to control the points. He lacks outright power to produce a lot of aces, but he has excellent spin on his serve, allowing him to force his opponents off the court, which leads to him taking the offensive at the beginning of the point. His two-handed backhand is much more compact than his forehand and is flatter, which allows him to take balls earlier on his backhand wing and drive the ball for winners. He is one of the players who generally plays the South American and European Summer clay court swings.

== Career ==
=== Juniors ===
Bellucci reached as high as No. 15 in the junior combined world rankings, two weeks after his 17th birthday, in January 2005.

=== 2005-2007: Turned Professional ===
Bellucci began 2007 ranked No. 582, but had a rapid ascent in June to finish the year at No. 202.

=== 2008: Top 75 ===
The 20-year-old Bellucci continued his rapid rise early in 2008. The first week of the year, ranked No. 202, he made it to the quarterfinals of a Challenger in São Paulo.

Bellucci had little success in his next few tournaments, but in February he got back on track, beating No. 145 Pablo Andújar while qualifying into an ATP stop in Buenos Aires and then recording his first-ever ATP match win, over No. 83 Werner Eschauer, before bowing out in the next round to No. 25 Juan Ignacio Chela. The following week, he beat No. 130 Rubén Ramírez Hidalgo and No. 140 Eduardo Schwank en route to his first-ever Challenger title, in Santiago, Chile, to improve his ranking to No. 145. The next week, he beat No. 162 Dick Norman before losing in a Challenger second-round match.

In April, Bellucci began an amazing string of Challenger match wins in singles play. First, he won a minor Challenger in Florianópolis, Brazil, and made the final in doubles. Two weeks later, he ran his singles streak to 10 matches while winning a major Challenger in Tunis, beating No. 155 Andreas Beck, No. 363 Martin Verkerk, No. 136 Paul Capdeville, No. 113 Nicolás Massú, and No. 175 Dušan Vemić, and also won the doubles title. Those wins got him into the top 100 for the first time at No. 100. The following week, at a minor Challenger in Rabat, Morocco, he ran his streak to 15 matches while beating No. 136 Capdeville again, No. 96 Guillermo García López, and No. 119 Martín Vassallo Argüello to win the title and get his ranking to No. 81. His streak ended at 17 matches the next week, after beating No. 128 Rik de Voest to reach the quarterfinals of a challenger in Bordeaux, France, when he finally lost to No. 111 Igor Kunitsyn, improving Bellucci's ranking to No. 75.

In late May, he qualified for his first French Open, lost to 3-time defending champion and ATP No. 2 Rafael Nadal in the first round. At Wimbledon, he achieved his first win in a Grand Slam event, defeating Igor Kunitsyn in four sets. He lost in the first round of the 2008 Olympics to Dominik Hrbatý.

=== 2009 ===
Bellucci began the year reaching the Brasil Open final for the first time. He upset the former world No. 1, 2003 French Open champion, and 2007 Brasil Open titlist Juan Carlos Ferrero in the quarterfinals, but eventually lost in 3 sets to second-seeded Tommy Robredo. It was his first ATP Tour final, after a string of Challengers.

In August, he would win his first title at the Swiss Open in Gstaad after reaching the main draw through qualification and going on to beat local hope and former world No. 9 Stanislas Wawrinka, former world No. 4 Nicolas Kiefer, two-time Swiss Open runner-up Igor Andreev, and first-time finalist Andreas Beck in straight sets. Ranked No. 119 in the world at the time of his victory in Switzerland, Bellucci jumped 53 spots in the ATP World Tour rankings to No. 66 as a result.

In October, Bellucci reached his first hard-court ATP World Tour semifinal. He reached the last 4 at the Stockholm Open, losing to Olivier Rochus in three sets.

He then followed his good form to win his second Challenger title of the year, at the 2009 Copa Petrobras São Paulo in Brazil. He beat Nicolás Lapentti of Ecuador to win the sixth challenger of his career, and the second on his native soil. This result bumped Bellucci up to No. 37 in the world, the first time that Thomaz was ranked inside the Top 40 in the world in singles.

=== 2010: French Open fourth round, Top 25 ===
Thomaz entered the first tournament of the season, the Brisbane International ATP tournament worth 250 points. He made the quarter-finals after being narrowly edged out by Czech Tomáš Berdych, where he lost two tiebreaks. At the Heineken Open, at Auckland, he lost to Philipp Kohlschreiber in the second round. He then lost early to Andy Roddick at the 2010 Australian Open.

Going to the Latin America clay tournaments, on 2010 Movistar Open, at Chile, Bellucci defeated defending champion Fernando González in the semifinals and Juan Mónaco in the final match to capture his second tour title. In the 2010 Brasil Open he lost to compatriot Ricardo Mello in the quarterfinals. He then played in 2010 Abierto Mexicano Telcel, losing in the second round to eventual champion David Ferrer. In the 2010 BNP Paribas Open after receiving a bye in the first round and a walkover in the second round, he lost to Guillermo García López in three sets. In the 2010 Sony Ericsson Open he upset James Blake and Olivier Rochus but lost a hard-fought three-set match to Nicolás Almagro. Bellucci then lost in the first round at Monte Carlo. At the ATP 500 Barcelona, he reached the quarterfinals, losing to David Ferrer, after defeating Jarkko Nieminen, Victor Hănescu and Guillermo García López. At the Rome Masters 1000, he defeated Leonardo Mayer, John Isner, but lost to world no. 2, Novak Djokovic in the third round.

He continued in good form at the 2010 French Open. Thomaz reached the fourth round, losing to world no. 2 and former French Open champion Rafael Nadal in three sets. En route to the 4th round he defeated 14th seed Ivan Ljubičić, qualifier Pablo Andújar and Michaël Llodra. Bellucci suffered a third-round loss in Wimbledon to Robin Söderling, and lost a marathon quarterfinal at ATP 500 event in Hamburg to Seppi.

At the US Open, Thomaz started promisingly, beating American Tim Smyczek in straight sets, however, after a gruelling 3h51m battle with South African Kevin Anderson, he succumbed in a fifth-set tiebreaker.

=== 2011 ===
After reaching the quarterfinals in Auckland to start off the year, and losing a heartbreaking five-set match to Jan Hernych in the second round at the 2011 Australian Open, Bellucci went through a relatively poor run of form. He failed to defend his title at Santiago, losing in the quarterfinals to Fognini. He then reached the quarterfinals at his hometown 2011 Brasil Open but played poorly and lost to eventual finalist Juan Ignacio Chela.

At the Abierto Mexicano tournament, Bellucci beat a top ten player for the first time in his career, a three-set victory over world number 9 player Fernando Verdasco in the first round. However, in the semifinal match, he lost to eventual finalist Nicolás Almagro. He received a first-round bye at the BNP Paribas Open but was dumped quickly by Tomáš Berdych in the third round. Bellucci then had three straight losses at the 2011 Sony Ericsson Open, the 2011 Monte-Carlo Rolex Masters, and at the 2011 Barcelona Open Banco Sabadell. At the 2011 Estoril Open he lost in the quarterfinals to Pablo Cuevas.

Bellucci started playing better at the Madrid Open, managing to claim solid wins over Pablo Andújar and Florian Mayer, who retired due to fatigue. In the third round, he defeated World Number 4 Andy Murray to claim his first top 5 win. The following day in the quarterfinals, he backed up his win by dismissing World Number 7 Tomáš Berdych in two sets (for the first time in three meetings) to reach the semifinals of an ATP World Tour Masters 1000 tournament for the first time in his career. Bellucci ended up losing to eventual champion Novak Djokovic, who was yet to be defeated this season. The Brazilian controlled the match at the beginning, taking the first set and going up a break for a 3–1 lead in the second set, but the Serbian fought back and eventually won in three sets. Bellucci's semifinal effort in Madrid marked eight years since a Brazilian reached a semifinal stage in a Masters Series event, the last being former World No.1 Gustavo Kuerten who appeared in the 2003 Indian Wells final (losing to Lleyton Hewitt).

Bellucci lost to local qualifier Paolo Lorenzi in the first round of the Rome Masters in straight sets. At the French Open, Bellucci (seeded 23rd) defeated Andrey Golubev and Andreas Seppi but lost in the third round to 13th seed Richard Gasquet. Bellucci made more than 40 unforced errors in this three-hour match. Bellucci's next tournament was the Aegon Championship, opening his grass court season. He was defeated in the third round by Marin Čilić.

At Wimbledon, he lost in the first round in straight sets to Rainer Schüttler. He made it to the quarterfinals of the Farmers Classic in Los Angeles, but was defeated by Alex Bogomolov. At the US Open, he was defeated in the first round by Israeli Dudi Sela despite winning the first two sets.

He spent six tournaments without winning a single match, from the Cincinnati Masters to the Paris Masters.

=== 2012 ===
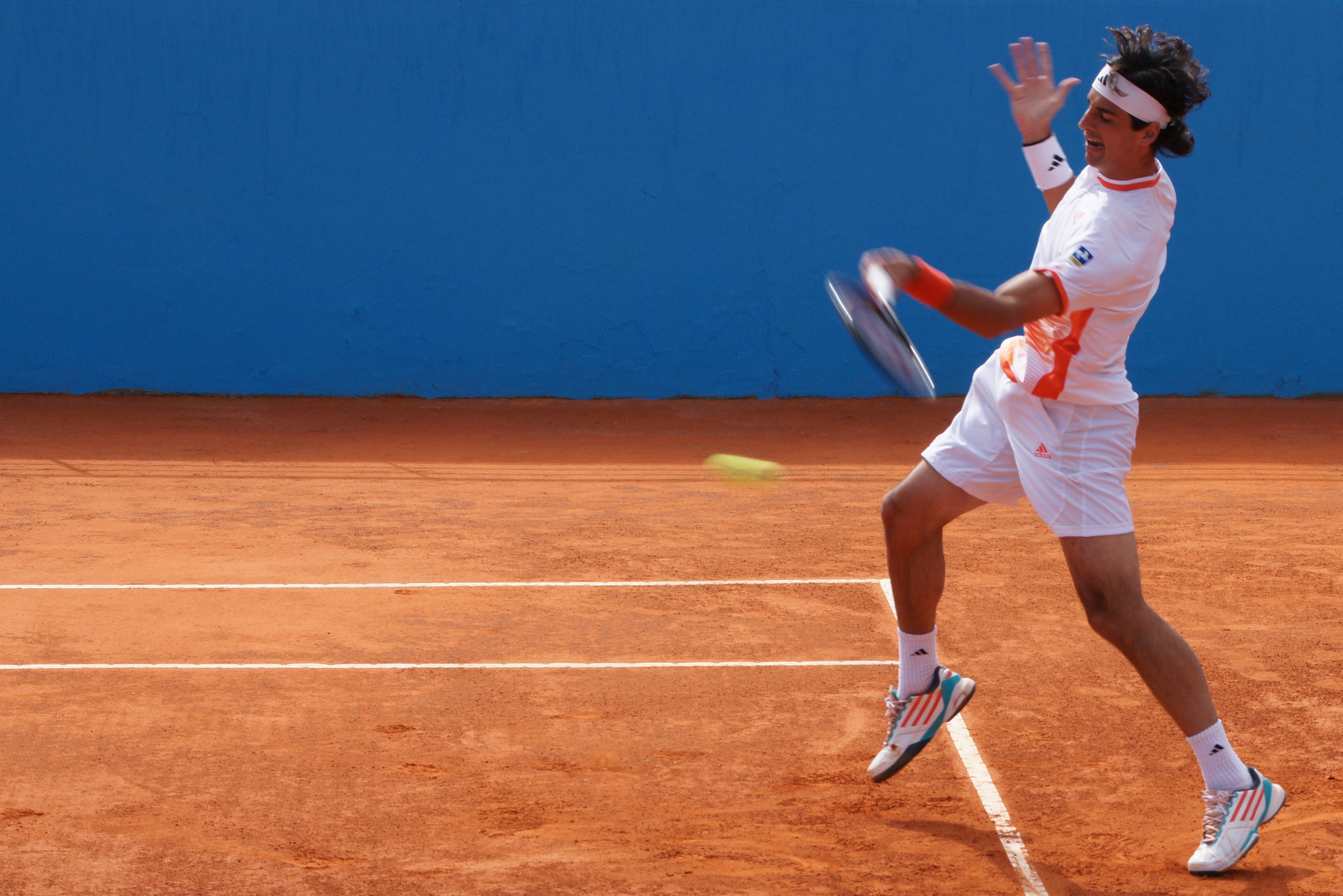
Thomaz Bellucci at the 2012 Open de Nice Côte d'Azur

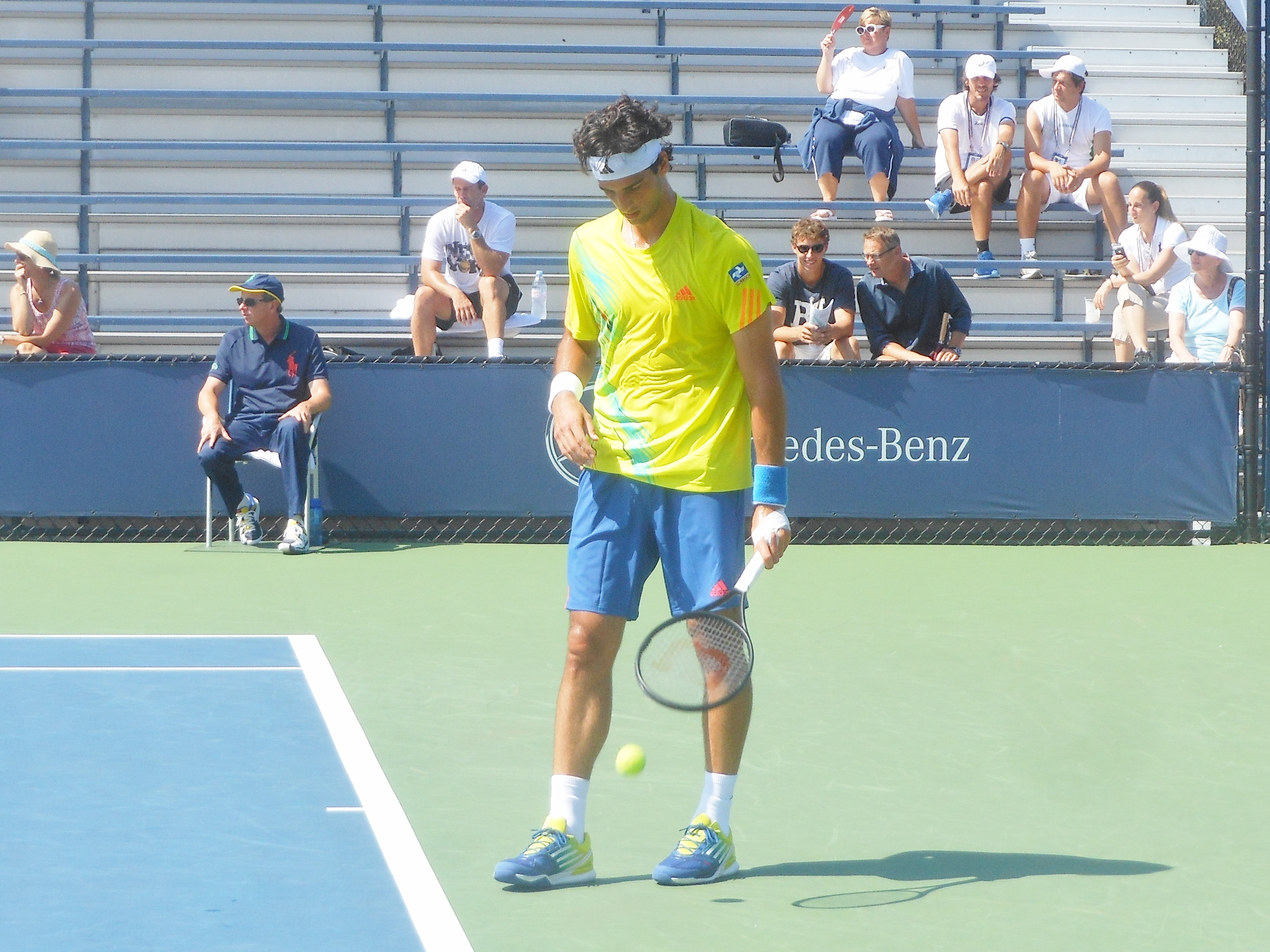
Bellucci at 2012 US Open

Bellucci started 2012 reaching three second rounds in a row, with the Australian Open included, where he lost to Gaël Monfils.

In the Brasil Open, he reached the semifinals, losing to Filippo Volandri. He then went to Indian Wells, where he managed to beat seed 20 Jürgen Melzer and walked over Russian Nikolay Davydenko to equalize his second best ever Masters 1000 campaign, reaching the fourth and losing to Roger Federer in three sets. At the Monte-Carlo Masters he defeated fifth seeded player David Ferrer to reach the third round, where he lost to Robin Haase.

After a few months without many significant results, including an elimination to Nadal in Wimbledon, he reached the semifinals at the Stuttgart Open, losing to eventual champion and World Number 8 Janko Tipsarević in three sets. He then won his third career title at the Gstaad Open (his second trophy of the tournament) with a three set win over the same Janko Tipsarević. At the 2012 Summer Olympics, he was knocked out in the first round of the men's singles by Jo-Wilfried Tsonga. He and teammate André Sá lost in the first round of the men's doubles to eventual gold medalists, the Bryan brothers. At the Kremlin Cup Bellucci reached his first final in a hard-court tournament, losing to Andreas Seppi. In the Swiss Open, he lost in three sets to World Number 1 Roger Federer in the second round of the tournament. Next came a first round at the BNP Paribas Open, though by November his ranking position was 33.

=== 2013: Australian Open doubles quarterfinal ===
After an early first-round loss to Blaž Kavčič at the 2013 Australian Open, Bellucci got to the quarterfinals in doubles, with partner Benoît Paire, losing to Marcel Granollers and Marc López. In Jacksonville, playing for Brazil in Davis Cup competition, he upset John Isner in a five-set match, but Brazil lost the tie to the US 3–2. He won in the 1R against fellow countryman Guilherme Clezar but fell again to Volandri in the 2R at Brasil Open. After losing to Volandri, the Brazilian had to hear boos from his own country crowd. After losing in the 1R in the next four tournaments (Buenos Aires, Acapulco, Indian Wells and Dallas) Bellucci finally came up with two wins in a row in Miami, over Daniel Brands and Jerzy Janowicz, then losing in the third round to Seppi. He started the European clay court season by losing again in the first round of Monte Carlo to Philipp Kohlschreiber and finally reached his first quarter-final of the year in Barcelona, by defeating Pablo Carreño Busta and Dmitry Tursunov; he withdrew from the tournament with an abdominal strain, which made him lose the rest of the European clay court season and the grass season, including Roland Garros and Wimbledon.

Coming back in Stuttgart, he lost in the 2R to Victor Hănescu. After that, he lost in the 1R for five times in a row (Hamburg, Gstaad, Kitzbühel, Montreal and Cincinnati) and dropped out of the top100 for the first time in five years. In October/November he disputed two challengers: the first he won the title in Montevideo against Diego Sebastián Schwartzman and in the second, in Bogotá, he felt pain in the abdomen in the middle of the championship match, retiring to the victory of Víctor Estrella and ended the year as the number 125 of the world.

=== 2014 ===
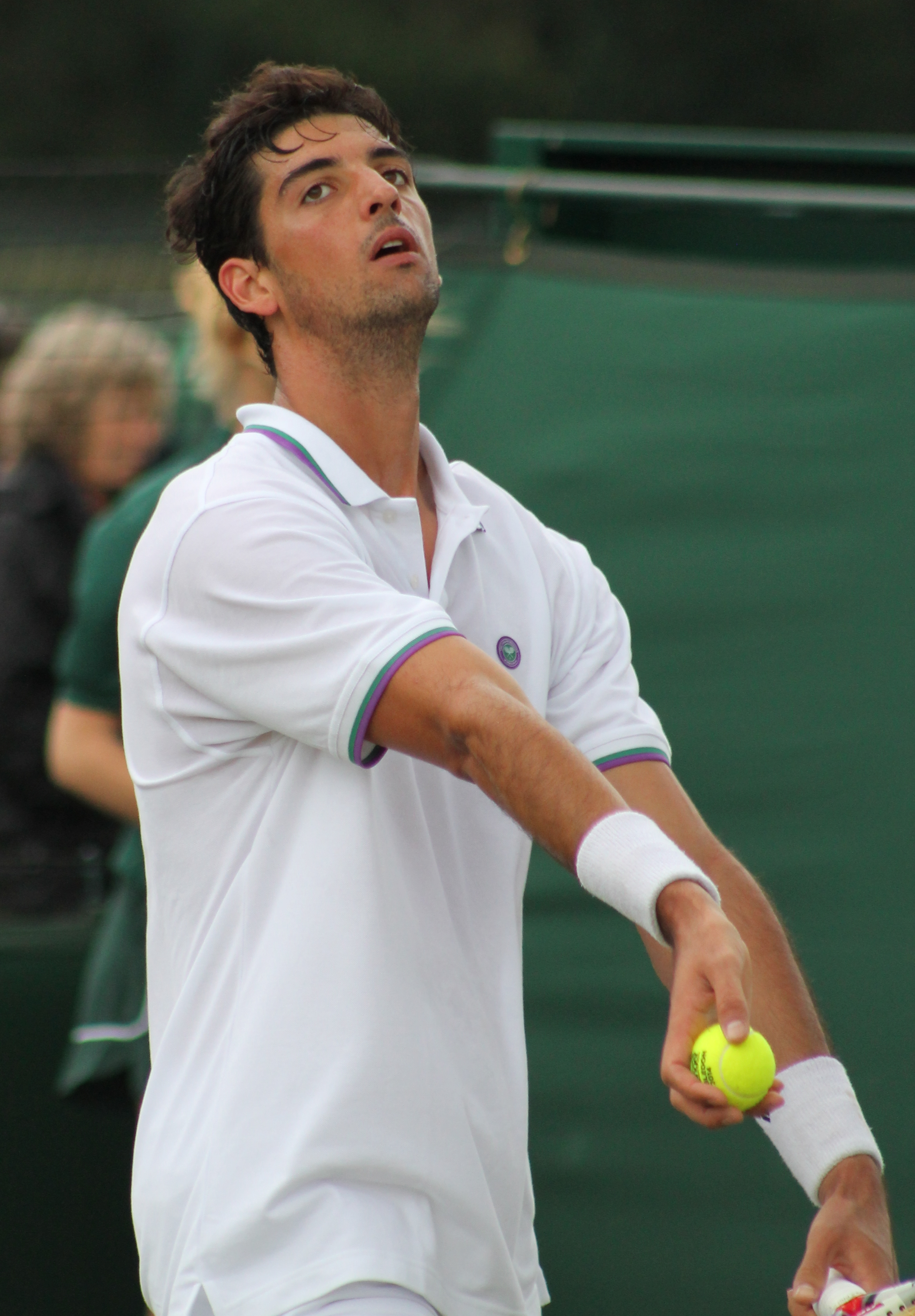
Bellucci at 2014 Wimbledon qualifying

Bellucci began the year qualifying for 2014 Australian Open, in which he won in the first round against German Julian Reister and lost in second to world no. 10 Jo-Wilfried Tsonga in straight sets. Then he qualified for the 2014 Royal Guard Open in Viña del Mar and lost in the 1st round to Japanese qualifier Taro Daniel. The Brazilian lost in the Q1 of Buenos Aires and followed with a quarterfinal campaign at the inaugural Rio Open, losing to 3rd-ranked David Ferrer after winning the first set. Got to semifinals in São Paulo, losing to Argentinian Federico Delbonis in three sets. Lost three matches in a row, respectively at Miami, Monte Carlo and Bucharest until he passed the quali in Munich and got as far as the quarterfinal stage, losing to 15th ranked Fabio Fognini.

Lost in Q2 of Madrid and at Roland Garros won in the 1st round against German Benjamin Becker in five sets (6–2, 6–4, 3–6, 4–6, 6–2) and lost in 2nd round again to Fognini in straight sets. Lost in the 2nd round of the Marburg Challenger to Swiss Henri Laaksonen and Q1 of Wimbledon to Aussie and former junior number 1, Luke Saville. Lost in the 2nd round of both Braunschweig and Scheveningen challengers to Philipp Petzschner and Matteo Viola. As a lucky loser, reached the 2nd round in Hamburg, but lost to Spaniard Pablo Andújar and followed with a quarterfinal showing at Gstaad, losing to Juan Mónaco. Lost in the 1st round of Winston-Salem to Frank Dancevic.

At the US Open, Bellucci defeated Nicolas Mahut in straight sets before falling to No. 4 ranked, Stan Wawrinka in the second round after giving a good fight to the grand slam champion, winning the third set and being a break up in the fourth before losing by 3–6, 4–6, 6–3, 6–7. In the Davis Cup play-offs, Bellucci was a key component of a stunning victory of Brazil over Spain in the clay courts of São Paulo. The Brazilian was two sets down against known foe Pablo Andújar before coming back to win 3–6, 6–7, 6–4, 7–5, 6–3. After the doubles team of Marcelo Melo and Bruno Soares made it to a 2–1 advantage for Brazil, Bellucci finished the job and clinched the place for his country in the 2015 World Group by winning a nervous four setter against 15th ranked Roberto Bautista Agut (6–4, 3–6, 6–3, 6–2) and Brazil 3–1 Spain. After the match, Thomaz fell to his knees, crying, as the same crowd that booed him one year earlier, applauded as their hero consolidated this historic win. Bellucci reached the quarterfinal stage at Vienna after defeating third seed Feliciano López and again at Valencia after winning over Mikhail Youzhny and Bautista Agut. Therefore, the Brazilian closed the season back in the top 100, ranked 65th in the world.

=== 2015 ===
Bellucci began the year by losing in the first round of Auckland to Jiří Veselý and had the same result at the Australian Open, despite taking a set from world no. 10 David Ferrer. Reached semifinal stage at the inaugural Quito Open, losing to eventual champion Víctor Estrella Burgos. Lost seven matches in a row (São Paulo, Rio, Buenos Aires, Davis Cup, Indian Wells and Irving) respectively to Martin Kližan, Rafael Nadal, Paolo Lorenzi, Leonardo Mayer, Federico Delbonis, Simone Bolelli and Sergiy Stakhovsky.

Returned to victory ways at the Miami Open, the Brazilian beat Lleyton Hewitt and seeded player Pablo Cuevas to reach the third round, after which he was beaten by Alexandr Dolgopolov. At Barcelona reached the 2nd round, beating Yūichi Sugita and losing to Roberto Bautista Agut. Got as far as the quarterfinal stage at Istanbul, beating Mikhail Youzhny and Denis Istomin, losing to Pablo Cuevas. Qualified for the Madrid Masters, after taking down Michael Berrer and Federico Delbonis, and on the main draw beat 32 seed Jérémy Chardy and lost a hard-fought match to 18th-ranked John Isner (6–7, 7–6, 1–6). At the Rome Masters, he qualified again by defeating Alejandro González and Ivan Dodig, on the main draw defeated Diego Schwartzman and world no. 19 Roberto Bautista Agut to reach the third round, where he fell to Novak Djokovic in three sets.

In May, he won his fourth tournament at the Geneva Open, beating en route to the title Marcos Bahgdatis, Denis Istomin, Albert Ramos Viñolas, Santiago Giraldo and João Sousa, to lift his fourth world tour level trophy and get back to the Top 40 players in the world after two years. Next, at Roland Garros Bellucci easily put away 100th ranked Marinko Matosevic (6–1, 6–2, 6–4), but lost to 5th ranked Kei Nishikori (7–5, 6–4, 6–4).

=== 2016 ===
In February, Bellucci began the year with a runner-up at Ecuador Open, defeated by Dominican Víctor Estrella Burgos 6–4, 6–7, 2–6. In May, in Internazionali BNL d'Italia after beating Gaël Monfils (6–3, 7–6) and Nicolas Mahut (6–4, 6–3), Bellucci won a historic first set against #1 Novak Djokovic with a 6–0 in 24 minutes. Djokovic won the game with a good return in the second and third sets (6–0, 3–6, 2–6). In July, won his ninth Challenger title at Sparkassen Open, defeating Íñigo Cervantes 6–1, 1–6, 6–3. At the Rio Olympics, Bellucci reached the quarterfinals of the men's singles where he lost to Rafael Nadal. He reached the second round of the men's doubles with André Sá.

=== 2017: Eighth singles final ===
In April, in U.S. Men's Clay Court Championships after beating players like Frances Tiafoe (7–5, 1–6, 6–2) and seeded player Sam Querrey (6–4, 3–6, 6–3), Bellucci lost to Steve Johnson (4–6, 6–4, 6–7) in his single final that year.

=== 2018: Provisional suspension due to doping ===
On 5 January, Bellucci was suspended by the ITF for 5 months after a positive test for doping substances.

=== 2019: Third doubles final ===
In February, at Rio Open after he failed to achieve the main draw in singles losing in qualifying at the first round, he was runner-up in doubles partnering Brazilian Rogério Dutra Silva as a wildcard pair, losing to Máximo González and Nicolás Jarry, 7–6^{(7–3)}, 3–6, [7–10].

=== 2023: Retirement ===
Bellucci announced on 12 January 2023 that the Rio Open would be his last tournament.

== Performance timelines ==
Key
W	F	SF	QF	#R	RR	Q#	P#	DNQ	A	Z#	PO	G	S	B	NMS	NTI	P	NH

(W) winner; (F) finalist; (SF) semifinalist; (QF) quarterfinalist; (#R) rounds 4, 3, 2, 1; (RR) round-robin stage; (Q#) qualification round; (P#) preliminary round; (DNQ) did not qualify; (A) absent; (Z#) Davis/Fed Cup Zonal Group (with number indication) or (PO) play-off; (G) gold, (S) silver or (B) bronze Olympic/Paralympic medal; (NMS) not a Masters tournament; (NTI) not a Tier I tournament; (P) postponed; (NH) not held; (SR) strike rate (events won / competed); (W–L) win–loss record.
To avoid confusion and double counting, these charts are updated at the conclusion of a tournament or when the player's participation has ended.

=== Singles ===
Tournament	2007	2008	2009	2010	2011	2012	2013	2014	2015	2016	2017	2018	2019	2020	2021	2022	2023	SR	W–L
Grand Slam tournaments
Australian Open	A	A	1R	2R	2R	2R	1R	2R	1R	2R	1R	A	Q1	A	A	A	A	0 / 9	5–9
French Open	A	1R	1R	4R	3R	1R	A	2R	2R	1R	2R	1R	A	A	A	A	A	0 / 10	8–10
Wimbledon	A	2R	A	3R	1R	1R	A	Q1	1R	2R	1R	A	A	NH	A	A	A	0 / 7	4–7
US Open	Q1	2R	2R	2R	1R	1R	1R	2R	3R	1R	1R	A	A	A	A	A	A	0 / 10	6–10
Win–loss	0–0	2–3	1–3	7–4	3–4	1–4	0–2	3–3	3–4	2–4	1–4	0–1	0–0	0–0	0–0	0–0	0–0	0 / 36	23–36
ATP Tour Masters 1000
Indian Wells Masters	A	A	2R	3R	3R	4R	1R	A	1R	2R	1R	A	A	NH	A	A	A	0 / 8	4–8
Miami Open	A	A	1R	4R	2R	1R	3R	Q1	3R	2R	2R	A	A	NH	A	A	A	0 / 8	7–8
Monte-Carlo Masters	A	A	Q1	1R	1R	3R	1R	Q1	A	1R	A	A	A	NH	A	A	A	0 / 5	2–5
Madrid Open	A	A	A	2R	SF	1R	A	Q2	2R	1R	1R	A	A	NH	A	A	A	0 / 6	6–6
Italian Open	A	A	1R	3R	1R	1R	A	A	3R	3R	1R	A	A	A	A	A	A	0 / 7	6–7
Canadian Open	A	1R	A	1R	2R	A	1R	A	2R	A	A	A	A	NH	A	A	A	0 / 5	2–5
Cincinnati Masters	A	1R	A	2R	1R	A	1R	A	2R	A	A	A	A	A	A	A	A	0 / 5	2–5
Shanghai Masters	NMS		2R	2R	1R	1R	A	A	1R	Q2	A	A	A	NH			A	0 / 5	2–5
Paris Masters	A	A	A	2R	1R	1R	A	A	2R	A	A	A	A	A	A	A	A	0 / 4	2–4
Win–loss	0–0	0–2	2–4	8–9	6–9	4–7	2–5	0–0	8–8	2–5	1–4	0–0	0–0	0–0	0–0	0–0	0–0	0 / 53	33–53
National representation
Summer Olympics	NH	1R	NH			1R	NH			QF	NH				A	NH		0 / 3	3–3
Davis Cup	PO	PO	PO	PO	PO	PO	1R	PO	1R	PO	PO	A	A	A	A	A	A	0 / 2	21–15
Career statistics
Titles	0	0	1	1	0	1	0	0	1	0	0	0	0	0	0	0	0	4	
Finals	0	0	2	1	0	2	0	0	1	1	1	0	0	0	0	0	0	8	
Overall win–loss	0–1	14–15	21–18	34–25	25–25	27–22	8–18	17–13	30–30	19–24	14–20	1–5	0–0	0–0	0–1	0–0	0–1	200–218	
Year-end ranking	202	85	36	31	37	33	125	65	37	61	113	225	319	281	449	907	–	48%	

=== Doubles ===
Tournament	2007	2008	2009	2010	2011	2012	2013	2014	2015	2016	2017	2018	2019	2020	2021	SR	W–L
Grand Slam tournaments
Australian Open	A	A	A	1R	A	1R	QF	A	A	2R	1R	A	A	A	A	0 / 5	4–5
French Open	A	A	A	A	A	A	A	A	1R	1R	1R	A	A	A	A	0 / 3	0–3
Wimbledon	A	1R	A	A	A	1R	A	A	2R	A	1R	A	A	NH	A	0 / 4	1–4
US Open	A	A	1R	A	A	2R	A	A	2R	3R	A	A	A	A	A	0 / 4	4–4
Win–loss	0–0	0–1	0–1	0–1	0–0	1–3	3–1	0–0	2–3	3–3	0–3	0–0	0–0	0–0	0–0	0 / 16	9–16
National representation
Summer Olympics	NH	A	NH			1R	NH			2R	NH				A	0 / 2	1–2
Davis Cup	PO	PO	PO	PO	PO	PO	1R	PO	1R	PO	PO	A	A	A	A	0 / 2	1–0
Career statistics
Titles / Finals	0 / 0	0 / 0	0 / 0	0 / 0	0 / 0	0 / 0	1 / 1	0 / 0	0 / 0	0 / 1	0 / 0	0 / 0	0 / 0	0 / 0	0 / 0	1 / 2	
Year-end ranking	300	152	484	178	207	211	80	465	151	102	405	451	153	476	764		

== ATP career finals ==
=== Singles: 8 (4 titles, 4 runner-ups) ===
Legend Grand Slam tournaments (0–0) ATP World Tour Finals (0–0) ATP World Tour Masters 1000 (0–0) ATP World Tour 500 Series (0–0) ATP World Tour 250 Series (4–4)	Finals by surface Hard (0–1) Clay (4–3) Grass (0–0)	Finals by setting Outdoor (4–3) Indoor (0–1)

Result	W–L	Date	Tournament	Tier	Surface	Opponent	Score
Loss	0–1	Feb 2009	Brasil Open, Brazil	250 Series	Clay	(Spain) Tommy Robredo	3–6, 6–3, 4–6
Win	1–1	Aug 2009	Swiss Open, Switzerland	250 Series	Clay	(Germany) Andreas Beck	6–4, 7–6^{(7–2)}
Win	2–1	Feb 2010	Chile Open, Chile	250 Series	Clay	(Argentina) Juan Mónaco	6–2, 0–6, 6–4
Win	3–1	Jul 2012	Swiss Open, Switzerland (2)	250 Series	Clay	(Serbia) Janko Tipsarević	6–7^{(6–8)}, 6–4, 6–2
Loss	3–2	Oct 2012	Kremlin Cup, Russia	250 Series	Hard (i)	(Italy) Andreas Seppi	6–3, 6–7^{(3–7)}, 3–6
Win	4–2	May 2015	Geneva Open, Switzerland	250 Series	Clay	(Portugal) João Sousa	7–6^{(7–4)}, 6–4
Loss	4–3	Feb 2016	Ecuador Open, Ecuador	250 Series	Clay	(Dominican Republic) Víctor Estrella Burgos	6–4, 6–7^{(5–7)}, 2–6
Loss	4–4	Apr 2017	U.S. Men's Clay Court Championships, US	250 Series	Clay	(United States) Steve Johnson	4–6, 6–4, 6–7^{(5–7)}

=== Doubles: 3 (1 title, 2 runner-ups) ===
Legend Grand Slam tournaments (0–0) ATP World Tour Finals (0–0) ATP World Tour Masters 1000 (0–0) ATP World Tour 500 Series (0–1) ATP World Tour 250 Series (1–1)	Finals by surface Hard (0–0) Clay (1–2) Grass (0–0)	Finals by setting Outdoor (1–2) Indoor (0–0)

Result	W–L	Date	Tournament	Tier	Surface	Partner	Opponents	Score
Win	1–0	Jul 2013	Stuttgart Open, Germany	250 Series	Clay	(Argentina) Facundo Bagnis	(Poland) Tomasz Bednarek (Poland) Mateusz Kowalczyk	2–6, 6–4, [11–9]
Loss	0–1	Feb 2016	Ecuador Open, Ecuador	250 Series	Clay	(Brazil) Marcelo Demoliner	(Spain) Pablo Carreño Busta (Argentina) Guillermo Durán	5–7, 4–6
Loss	1–2	Feb 2019	Rio Open, Brazil	500 Series	Clay	(Brazil) Rogério Dutra Silva	(Argentina) Máximo González (Chile) Nicolás Jarry	7–6^{(7–3)}, 3–6, [7–10]

== ATP Challenger and ITF Futures finals ==
=== Singles: 18 (10–8) ===
Legend ATP Challenger (9–6) ITF Futures (1–2)	Finals by surface Hard (0–1) Clay (10–7) Grass (0–0) Carpet (0–0)

Result	W–L	Date	Tournament	Tier	Surface	Opponent	Score
Loss	0–1	Sep 2006	Brazil F10, Fortaleza	Futures	Clay	(Brazil) Ricardo Hocevar	1–6, 4–6
Loss	0–2	Nov 2006	Brazil F18, São Paulo	Futures	Clay	(Argentina) Juan-Pablo Villar	2–6, 4–6
Win	1–2	May 2007	Brazil F5, Chapecó	Futures	Clay	(Brazil) Leonardo Kirche	6–4, 7–5
Loss	1–3	Jul 2007	Bogotá, Colombia	Challenger	Clay	(Ecuador) Carlos Salamanca	6–4, 3–6, 2–6
Loss	1–4	Jul 2007	Cuenca, Ecuador	Challenger	Clay	(Argentina) Leonardo Mayer	3–6, 2–6
Win	2–4	Mar 2008	Santiago, Chile	Challenger	Clay	(Argentina) Eduardo Schwank	6–4, 7–6^{(7–3)}
Win	3–4	Apr 2008	Florianópolis, Brazil	Challenger	Clay	(Brazil) Franco Ferreiro	4–6, 6–4, 6–2
Win	4–4	May 2008	Tunis, Tunisia	Challenger	Clay	(Serbia) Dušan Vemić	6–2, 6–4
Win	5–4	May 2008	Rabat, Morocco	Challenger	Clay	(Argentina) Martín Vassallo Argüello	6–2, 6–2
Win	6–4	Jul 2009	Rimini, Italy	Challenger	Clay	(Argentina) Juan Pablo Brzezicki	3–6, 6–3, 6–1
Win	7–4	Nov 2009	São Paulo, Brazil	Challenger	Clay	(Ecuador) Nicolás Lapentti	6–4, 6–4
Loss	7–5	Oct 2010	São Paulo, Brazil	Challenger	Clay	(Brazil) Marcos Daniel	1–6, 6–3, 3–6
Win	8–5	Jul 2012	Braunschweig, Germany	Challenger	Clay	(Germany) Tobias Kamke	7–6^{(7–4)}, 6–3
Win	9–5	Nov 2013	Montevideo, Uruguay	Challenger	Clay	(Argentina) Diego Schwartzman	6–4, 6–4
Loss	9–6	Nov 2013	Bogotá, Colombia	Challenger	Clay	(Dominican Republic) Víctor Estrella Burgos	2–6, 0–3 ret.
Loss	9–7	Sep 2014	Orléans, France	Challenger	Hard (i)	(Ukraine) Sergiy Stakhovsky	2–6, 5–7
Win	10–7	Jul 2016	Braunschweig, Germany	Challenger	Clay	(Spain) Íñigo Cervantes Huegun	6–1, 1–6, 6–3
Loss	10–8	Jul 2016	Biella, Italy	Challenger	Clay	(Italy) Federico Gaio	6–7^{(5–7)}, 2–6

=== Doubles: 14 (6–8) ===
Legend ATP Challenger (4–3) ITF Futures (2–5)	Finals by surface Hard (1–0) Clay (5–8) Grass (0–0) Carpet (0–0)

Result	W–L	Date	Tournament	Tier	Surface	Partner	Opponents	Score
Win	1–0	Nov 2004	Brazil F13, Santos	Futures	Clay	(Brazil) Thiago Alves	(Uruguay) Pablo Cuevas (Argentina) Agustín Tarantino	6–3, 3–6, 6–4
Loss	1–1	Nov 2004	Brazil F14, Brasília	Futures	Clay (i)	(Brazil) Thiago Alves	(Brazil) Marcelo Melo (Brazil) Antonio Prieto	3–6, 6–3, 3–6
Loss	1–2	Nov 2005	Chile F5, Santiago	Futures	Clay	(Poland) Filip Urban	(Argentina) Emiliano Redondi (Argentina) Patricio Rudi	6–7^{(1–7)}, 3–6
Loss	1–3	May 2006	Brazil F2, Florianópolis	Futures	Clay	(Brazil) Rogério Dutra Silva	(Brazil) Franco Ferreiro (Brazil) Gabriel Pitta	4–6, 4–6
Loss	1–4	Jun 2006	Brazil F5, Sorocaba	Futures	Clay	(Ecuador) Carlos Avellán	(Brazil) Franco Ferreiro (Brazil) Rogério Dutra Silva	6–7^{(3–7)}, 4–6
Win	2–4	Aug 2006	Brazil F8, Florianópolis	Futures	Clay	(Brazil) Daniel Dutra da Silva	(Brazil) Carlos Cirne Lima (Brazil) Renato Silveira	6–4, 6–1
Loss	2–5	May 2007	Brazil F5, Chapecó	Futures	Clay	(Brazil) Caio Burjaili	(Brazil) André Miele (Brazil) João Souza	6–2, 2–6, 2–6
Win	3–5	Oct 2007	Bogotá, Colombia	Challenger	Clay	(Brazil) Bruno Soares	(Spain) Marcel Granollers (Spain) Santiago Ventura	6–4, 4–6, [11–9]
Loss	3–6	Mar 2008	Bogotá, Colombia	Challenger	Clay	(Brazil) Bruno Soares	(Argentina) Brian Dabul (Paraguay) Ramón Delgado	6–7^{(5–7)}, 4–6
Loss	3–7	Apr 2008	Florianópolis, Brazil	Challenger	Clay	(Brazil) Bruno Soares	(Chile) Adrián García (Argentina) Leonardo Mayer	2–6, 0–6
Win	4–7	May 2008	Tunis, Tunisia	Challenger	Clay	(Brazil) Bruno Soares	(Switzerland) Jean-Claude Scherrer (France) Nicolas Tourte	6–3, 6–4
Loss	4–8	Oct 2008	Buenos Aires, Argentina	Challenger	Clay	(Spain) Rubén Ramírez Hidalgo	(Argentina) Máximo González (Argentina) Sebastián Prieto	5–7, 3–6
Win	5–8	Sep 2014	Orléans, France	Challenger	Hard (i)	(Brazil) André Sá	(United States) James Cerretani (Sweden) Andreas Siljeström	5–7, 6–4, [10–8]
Win	6–8	Apr 2019	Alicante, Spain	Challenger	Clay	(Argentina) Guillermo Durán	(Spain) Gerard Granollers Pujol (Spain) Pedro Martínez	2–6, 7–5, [10–5]

== Wins over top 10 players ==
Season	2007	2008	2009	2010	2011	2012	2013	2014	2015	2016	2017	2018	2019	2020	Total
Wins	0	0	0	0	3	2	0	0	0	0	1	0	0	0	6

#	Player	Rank	Event	Surface	Rd.	Score	TB Rank
2011
1.	(Spain) Fernando Verdasco	9	Acapulco Open, Mexico	Clay	1R	6–2, 4–6, 6–3	36
2.	(United Kingdom) Andy Murray	4	Madrid, Spain	Clay	3R	6–4, 6–2	36
3.	(Czech Republic) Tomáš Berdych	7	Madrid, Spain	Clay	QF	7–6^{(7–2)}, 6–3	36
2012
4.	(Spain) David Ferrer	6	Monte Carlo, Monaco	Clay	2R	6–3, 6–2	45
5.	(Serbia) Janko Tipsarević	8	Gstaad, Switzerland	Clay	F	6–7^{(6–8)}, 6–4, 6–2	60
2017
6.	(Japan) Kei Nishikori	5	Rio de Janeiro, Brazil	Clay	1R	6–4, 6–3	76
