= Copa Petrobras São Paulo =

Defunct tennis tournament
- Location: São Paulo, Brazil
- Category: ATP Challenger Tour
- Surface: Clay / Outdoors
- Draw: 32S/32Q/16D
- Prize money: $75,000
- Website: Official Website

The Copa Petrobras São Paulo was a tennis tournament held in São Paulo, Brazil from 2009 until 2010. Between 2004 and 2008, it was held in Aracaju except for the 2007 edition which was held in Belo Horizonte. The event was part of the ATP Challenger Tour and played on outdoor red clay courts.

== Past finals ==
=== Singles ===
Year	Champion	Runner-up	Score
2010	(Brazil) Marcos Daniel	(Brazil) Thomaz Bellucci	6–1, 3–6, 6–3
2009	(Brazil) Thomaz Bellucci	(Ecuador) Nicolás Lapentti	6–4, 6–4
2008	(Chile) Paul Capdeville	(Brazil) Thiago Alves	7–5, 6–4
2007	(France) Nicolas Devilder	(Spain) Marcel Granollers	6–2, 6–7, 7–6
2006	(Argentina) Sergio Roitman	(Serbia and Montenegro) Boris Pašanski	6–1, 6–3
2005	(Serbia and Montenegro) Boris Pašanski	(Ecuador) Nicolás Lapentti	7–6, 7–5
2004	(Ecuador) Nicolás Lapentti	(Brazil) Júlio Silva	6–2, 6–2

=== Doubles ===
Year	Champion	Runner-up	Score
2010	(Brazil) Franco Ferreiro (Brazil) André Sá	(Portugal) Rui Machado (Spain) Daniel Muñoz-de la Nava	3–6, 7–6(2), [10–8]
2009	(Brazil) Franco Ferreiro (Brazil) Ricardo Mello	(Argentina) Diego Junqueira (Spain) David Marrero	6–3, 6–3
2008	(Argentina) Juan-Martín Aranguren (Brazil) Franco Ferreiro	(Brazil) Thiago Alves (Brazil) João Souza	6–4, 6–4
2007	(Spain) Marcel Granollers (Spain) Santiago Ventura	(Chile) Adrián García (Argentina) Leonardo Mayer	6–3, 6–3
2006	(Argentina) Máximo González (Argentina) Sergio Roitman	(Germany) Tomas Behrend (Spain) Marcel Granollers	7–6, 3–6, [10–6]
2005	(Argentina) Máximo González (Argentina) Sergio Roitman	(Argentina) Carlos Berlocq (Argentina) Martín Vassallo Argüello	6–4, 6–7, 6–3
2004	(Italy) Enzo Artoni (Argentina) Ignacio González King	(Argentina) Juan Pablo Guzmán (Spain) Santiago Ventura	6–4, 6–2
