= Franco Ferreiro =

Brazilian tennis player

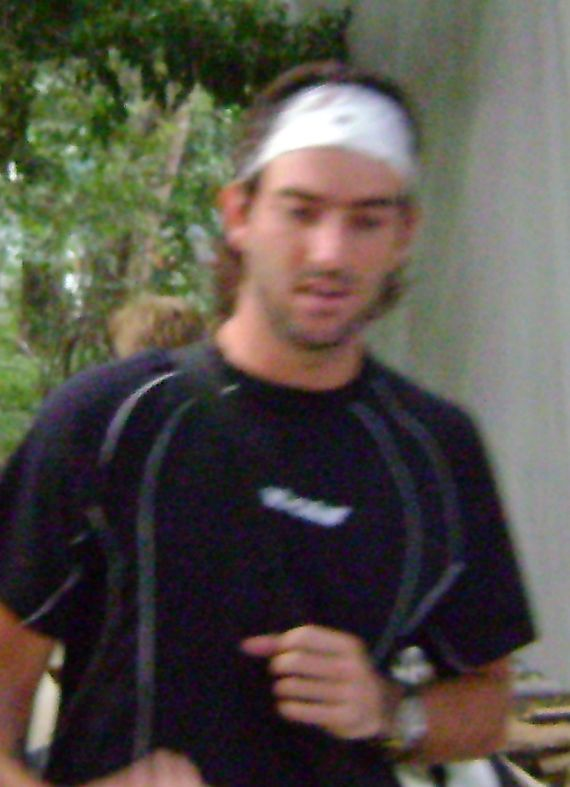
- Country (sports): Brazil
- Residence: Porto Alegre, Brazil
- Born: 1 July 1984 (age 40); Uruguaiana, Brazil
- Height: 1.88 m (6 ft 2 in)
- Turned pro: 2002
- Retired: 2012
- Plays: Right-handed (one-handed backhand)
- Prize money: $388,200

Singles
- Career record: 3-5 (ATP Tour level, Grand Slam level, and Davis Cup)
- Career titles: 0
- Highest ranking: No. 136 (August 4, 2008)

Grand Slam singles results
- French Open: 1R (2009)
- Wimbledon: Q2 (2009)

Doubles
- Career record: 15–20 (ATP Tour level, Grand Slam level, and Davis Cup)
- Career titles: 0
- Highest ranking: No. 53 (February 28, 2011)

Franco Ferreiro (born July 1, 1984) is a Brazilian former professional tennis player. He qualified for the 2009 French Open, but lost to Feliciano López in five sets in the first round after leading two sets to love.

== ATP Tour career finals ==
=== Doubles: 2 (0–2) ===
Legend (doubles) Grand Slam tournaments (0–0) ATP Finals (0–0) ATP Tour Masters 1000 (0–0) ATP Tour 500 Series (0–0) ATP Tour 250 Series (0–2)	Finals by surface Hard (0–0) Clay (0–2) Grass (0–0)	Finals by setting Outdoor (0–2) Indoor (0–0)

Result	W–L	Date	Tournament	Tier	Surface	Partner	Opponents	Score
Loss	0–1	Feb 2011	Copa Claro/Argentina Open, Argentina	250 Series	Clay	(Brazil) André Sá	(Austria) Oliver Marach (Argentina) Leonardo Mayer	6–7^{(6–8)}, 3–6
Loss	0–2	Aug 2011	Austrian Open, Austria	250 Series	Clay	(Brazil) André Sá	(Italy) Daniele Bracciali (Mexico) Santiago González	6–7^{(1–7)}, 6–4, [9–11]

=== Doubles (19) ===
No.	Date	Tournament	Surface	Partnering	Opponents in the final	Score
1.	May 24, 2005	Turin, Italy	Clay	(Argentina) Sergio Roitman	(Italy) Francesco Aldi (Italy) Alessio di Mauro	6–7^{(4–7)}, 7–5, 7–6^{(7–2)}
2.	September 25, 2006	Gramado, Brazil	Hard	(Uruguay) Martín Vilarrubí	(Brazil) Marcelo Melo (Brazil) André Sá	6–2, 6–4
3.	June 25, 2007	Reggio Emilia, Italy	Clay	(Algeria) Lamine Ouahab	(Uruguay) Pablo Cuevas (Argentina) Horacio Zeballos	6–4, 1–6, [10–4]
4.	June 9, 2008	Sofia, Bulgaria	Clay	(Argentina) Mariano Puerta	(North Macedonia) Lazar Magdinčev (North Macedonia) Predrag Rusevski	6–3, 1–6, [10–3]
5.	September 29, 2008	Aracaju, Brazil	Clay	(Argentina) Juan-Martín Aranguren	(Brazil) Thiago Alves (Brazil) João Souza	6–4, 6–4
6.	October 13, 2008	Montevideo, Uruguay	Clay	(Brazil) Flávio Saretta	(Spain) Daniel Gimeno Traver (Spain) Rubén Ramírez Hidalgo	6–3, 6–2
7.	October 26, 2009	São Paulo, Brazil	Clay	(Brazil) Ricardo Mello	(Argentina) Diego Junqueira (Spain) David Marrero	6–3, 6–3
8.	April 5, 2010	Bogotá, Colombia	Clay	(Mexico) Santiago González	(Germany) Dominik Meffert (Austria) Philipp Oswald	6–3, 5–7, [10–7]
9.	April 12, 2010	Blumenau, Brazil	Clay	(Brazil) André Sá	(Brazil) André Ghem (Italy) Simone Vagnozzi	6–4, 6–3
10.	July 5, 2010	Scheveningen, Netherlands	Clay	(India) Harsh Mankad	(Australia) Rameez Junaid (Germany) Philipp Marx	6–4, 3–6, [10–7]
11.	August 2, 2010	Segovia, Spain	Hard	(Brazil) Thiago Alves	(United States) Brian Battistone (India) Harsh Mankad	6–2, 5–7, [10–8]
12.	August 9, 2010	Brasília, Brazil	Hard	(Brazil) André Sá	(Brazil) Ricardo Mello (Brazil) Caio Zampieri	7–6^{(7–5)}, 6–3
13.	August 16, 2010	Salvador, Brazil	Hard	(Brazil) André Sá	(Belarus) Uladzimir Ignatik (Slovakia) Martin Kližan	6–2, 6–4
14.	September 26, 2010	Bogotá, Colombia	Clay	(Brazil) André Sá	(Germany) Gero Kretschmer (Germany) Alex Satschko	7–6^{(8–6)}, 6–4
15.	October 30, 2010	São Paulo, Brazil	Clay	(Brazil) André Sá	(Portugal) Rui Machado (Spain) Daniel Muñoz-de la Nava	3–6, 7–6^{(7–2)}, [10–8]
16.	January 9, 2011	São Paulo, Brazil	Hard	(Brazil) André Sá	(Mexico) Santiago González (Argentina) Horacio Zeballos	7–5, 7–6^{(14–12)}
17.	April 17, 2011	Blumenau, Brazil	Clay	(Brazil) André Sá	(Spain) Adrián Menéndez (Portugal) Leonardo Tavares	6–2, 3–6, [10–4]
18.	April 24, 2011	Santos, Brazil	Clay	(Brazil) André Sá	(Austria) Gerald Melzer (Brazil) José Pereira	6–3, 6–3
19.	November 5, 2011	São Leopoldo, Brazil	Clay	(Spain) Rubén Ramírez Hidalgo	(Portugal) Gastão Elias (Portugal) Frederico Gil	6–7^{(4–7)}, 6–3, [11–9]
