= Thiago Alves (tennis) =

Brazilian tennis player (born 1982)

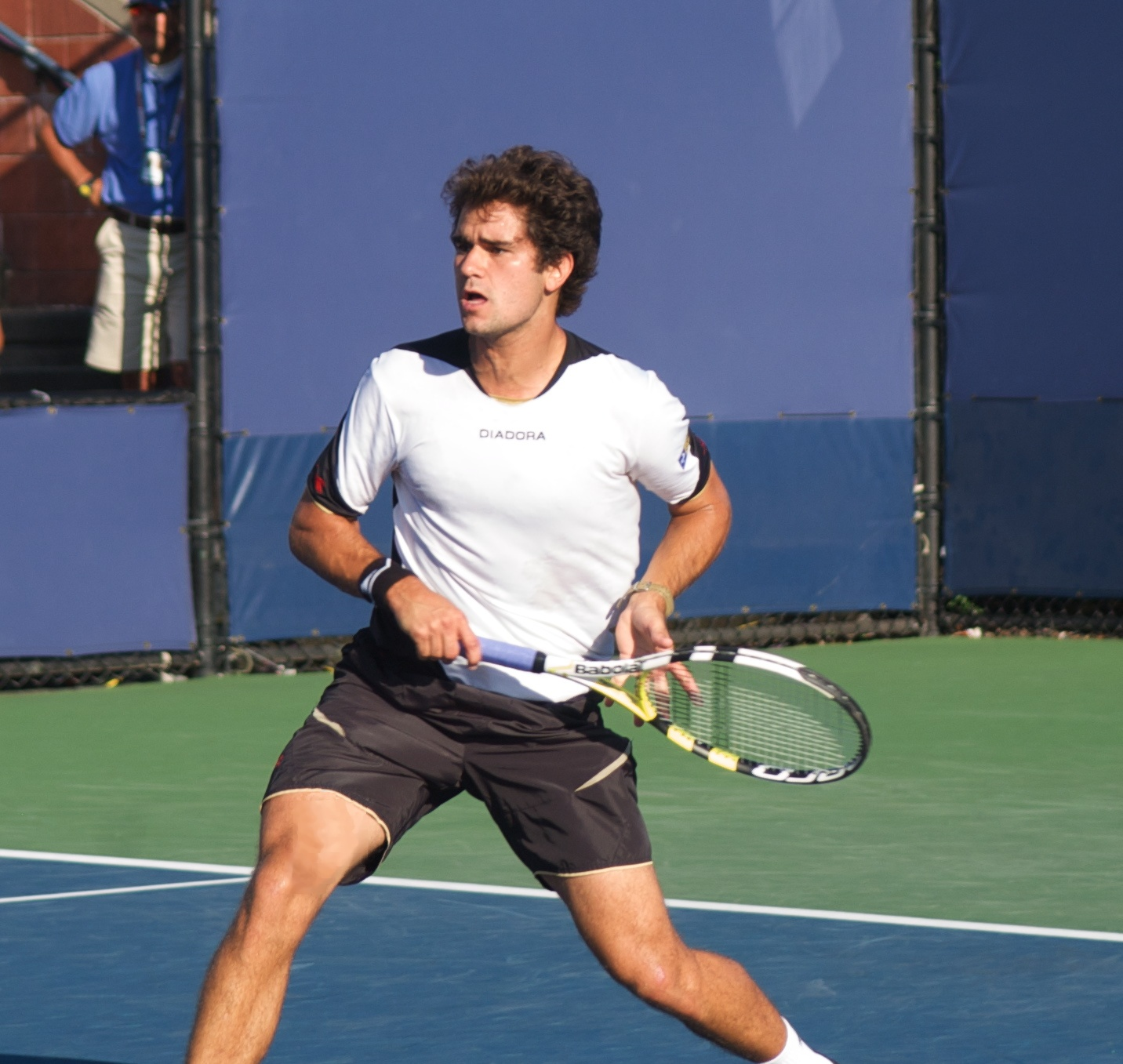
- Country (sports): Brazil
- Residence: Florianópolis, Brazil
- Born: May 22, 1982 (age 43); São José do Rio Preto, Brazil
- Height: 1.78 m (5 ft 10 in)
- Turned pro: 2000
- Retired: 2014
- Plays: Right-handed (two-handed backhand)
- Prize money: US$ 739,459

Singles
- Career record: 7–27 (ATP Tour level, Grand Slam level, and Davis Cup)
- Career titles: 0
- Highest ranking: No. 88 (July 13, 2009)

Grand Slam singles results
- Australian Open: Q1 (2007)
- French Open: 1R (2009, 2010)
- Wimbledon: 2R (2009)
- US Open: 2R (2006, 2008)

Doubles
- Career record: 0–2 (ATP Tour level, Grand Slam level, and Davis Cup)
- Career titles: 0
- Highest ranking: No. 151 (October 30, 2006)

Team competitions
- Davis Cup: 1R (2013)
- Last updated on: 22 June 2018.

Thiago Hernandez Alves (Brazilian Portuguese: [tʃiˈaɡu ˈawvis]; born May 22, 1982) is a retired Brazilian professional tennis player who competed mainly on the ITF Tour. His career-high singles ranking was World No. 88, achieved in July 2009.

== Tennis career ==
=== In Grand Slams ===
He has made four Grand Slam main draw appearances, qualifying into the U.S. Open in both 2006 and 2008, Roland Garros and Wimbledon in 2009. In 2006, he beat No. 359 Mariano Zabaleta in the first round before losing to No. 22 Fernando Verdasco in the 2nd round.

=== 2007 Win Over Moya ===
At the 2007 Brasil Open, Alves, roared on by his home crowd, scored a famous victory over No. 4 seed and former French Open champion Carlos Moyà. However, he fell to Juan Mónaco in the second round

=== 2008 ===
Alves lost to Roger Federer in the second round of the US Open in three sets.

=== 2009 ===
In the first round of the Johannesburg, SA Tennis Open he lost heavily to Jo-Wilfried Tsonga. He also lost in the first round of the 2009 French Open to Jérémy Chardy.

At Wimbledon he played in the first round as a lucky loser and defeated Andrei Pavel. He faced 8th seed Gilles Simon in the second round and won the first set but went on to lose.

== Career titles ==
=== Singles (7) ===
| Legend Grand Slam (0) Tennis Masters Cup (0) ATP Masters Series (0) ATP Tour (0) Challengers (7) | Titles by surface Hard (6) Grass (0) Clay (1) Carpet (0) |

| No. | Date | Tournament | Surface | Opponent | Score |
|---|---|---|---|---|---|
| 1. | August 15, 2005 | Manta, Ecuador | Hard | (United States) Lesley Joseph | 6–4, 6–1 |
| 2. | October 10, 2005 | Quito, Ecuador | Clay | (Brazil) Marcos Daniel | 1–6, 7–6^{(7–1)}, 6–2 |
| 3. | July 31, 2006 | Belo Horizonte, Brazil | Hard | (Brazil) André Sá | 6–3, 0–6, 6–4 |
| 4. | August 14, 2006 | Manta, Ecuador | Hard | (Argentina) Brian Dabul | 6–2, 6–2 |
| 5. | December 31, 2007 | São Paulo, Brazil | Hard | (Argentina) Carlos Berlocq | 6–4, 3–6, 7–5 |
| 6. | January 8, 2012 | São Paulo, Brazil | Hard | (Portugal) Gastão Elias | 7–6^{(7–5)}, 7–6^{(7–1)} |
| 7. | March 18, 2012 | Guadalajara, Mexico | Hard | (Italy) Paolo Lorenzi | 6–3, 7–6^{(6–4)} |

=== Doubles (3) ===
| Legend Grand Slam (0) Tennis Masters Cup (0) ATP Masters Series (0) ATP Tour (0) Challengers (3) | Titles by surface Hard (3) Grass (0) Clay (0) Carpet (0) |

| No. | Date | Tournament | Surface | Partnering | Opponents | Score |
|---|---|---|---|---|---|---|
| 1. | January 2, 2006 | São Paulo, Brazil | Hard | (Brazil) Flávio Saretta | (Brazil) Lucas Engel (Brazil) André Ghem | 7–6^{(12–10)}, 6–3 |
| 2. | March 13, 2006 | Salinas, Ecuador | Hard | (Brazil) Júlio Silva | (Brazil) André Ghem (Brazil) Alexandre Simoni | 7–6^{(7–5)}, 6–4 |
| 3. | August 8, 2010 | Segovia, Spain | Hard | (Brazil) Franco Ferreiro | (United States) Brian Battistone (India) Harsh Mankad | 6–2, 5–7, [10–8] |

== Runners-up ==
=== Singles (10) ===
| Legend Grand Slam (0) Tennis Masters Cup (0) ATP Masters Series (0) ATP Tour (0) Challengers (10) | Finals by surface Hard (8) Grass (0) Clay (2) Carpet (0) |

| No. | Date | Tournament | Surface | Opponent | Score |
|---|---|---|---|---|---|
| 1. | July 18, 2005 | Tarzana, USA | Hard | (United States) Alex Bogomolov, Jr. | 6–3, 6–2 |
| 2. | January 2, 2006 | São Paulo, Brazil | Hard | (Brazil) Flávio Saretta | 7–6^{(7–2)}, 6–3 |
| 3. | September 25, 2006 | Gramado, Brazil | Hard | (Brazil) Franco Ferreiro | 3–6, 7–6^{(7–4)}, 6–5 ret. |
| 4. | August 4, 2008 | Segovia, Spain | Hard | (Ukraine) Sergiy Stakhovsky | 7–5, 7–6^{(7–4)} |
| 5. | September 29, 2008 | Aracaju, Brazil | Clay | (Chile) Paul Capdeville | 7–5, 6–4 |
| 6. | July 12, 2009 | Pozoblanco, Spain | Hard | (Slovakia) Karol Beck | 6–4, 6–3 |
| 7. | August 8, 2009 | Campos do Jordão, Brazil | Hard | (Argentina) Horacio Zeballos | 6–7^{(4–7)}, 6–4, 6–3 |
| 8. | May 8, 2010 | Ramat HaSharon, Israel | Hard | (Republic of Ireland) Conor Niland | 5–7, 7–6^{(7–5)}, 6–3 |
| 9. | August 21, 2010 | Salvador, Brazil | Hard | (Brazil) Ricardo Mello | 5–7, 6–4, 6–4 |
| 10. | September 16, 2012 | Cali, Colombia | Clay | (Brazil) João Souza | 6–2, 6–4 |

=== Doubles (7) ===
| Legend Grand Slam (0) Tennis Masters Cup (0) ATP Masters Series (0) ATP Tour (0) Challengers (7) | Finals by surface Hard (2) Grass (0) Clay (5) Carpet (0) |

| No. | Date | Tournament | Surface | Partnering | Opponents | Score |
|---|---|---|---|---|---|---|
| 1. | April 10, 2006 | Florianópolis, Brazil | Clay | (Brazil) Júlio Silva | (Argentina) Máximo González (Argentina) Sergio Roitman | 6–2, 3–6, [10–5] |
| 2. | March 5, 2007 | Salinas, Ecuador | Hard | (Brazil) Franco Ferreiro | (United States) Scott Lipsky (United States) David Martin | 7–5, 7–6^{(11–9)} |
| 3. | September 29, 2008 | Aracaju, Brazil | Clay | (Brazil) João Souza | (Argentina) Juan-Martín Aranguren (Brazil) Franco Ferreiro | 6–4, 6–4 |
| 4. | November 3, 2008 | Guayaquil, Ecuador | Clay | (Brazil) Ricardo Hocevar | (Argentina) Sebastián Decoud (Colombia) Santiago Giraldo | 6–4, 6–4 |
| 5. | October 4, 2009 | Naples, Italy | Clay | (Czech Republic) Augusto Laranja | (Argentina) Guido Andreozzi (Uruguay) Marcel Felder | 6–3, 6–3 |
| 6. | May 12, 2012 | Rio Quente, Brazil | Hard | (Brazil) Lukáš Rosol | (Croatia) Ivan Dodig (Portugal) Fred Gil | 6–1, 6–3 |
| 7. | September 22, 2013 | Campinas, Brazil | Clay | (Brazil) Thiago Monteiro | (Argentina) Guido Andreozzi (Argentina) Máximo González | 6–4, 6–4 |
