= Tennis at the 2016 Summer Olympics – Qualification =

Qualification
- Tennis at the 2016 Summer Olympics

Events
Singles	men	women
Doubles	men	women	mixed
Qualification
- Summer Olympics

Qualification for tennis at the 2016 Summer Olympics in Rio de Janeiro, Brazil was not determined by any form of qualifying tournament, but by the rankings maintained by the Association of Tennis Professionals (ATP) and the Women's Tennis Association (WTA).

== Qualifying criteria ==
The main qualifying criteria were the ATP and WTA ranking lists published on 6 June 2016. The players entering were formally submitted by the International Tennis Federation. The ATP and WTA rankings were based on performances from the previous 52 weeks, and there were several tournaments in the two-month period between the time of the rankings being frozen for entry and the beginning of the tennis events at the Olympics. Players had to be part of a nominated team for three Fed Cup (women) or Davis Cup (men) events between the 2012 and 2016 Olympics. This requirement was reduced to two Fed/Davis Cup events during the Olympic cycle from 2012 to 2016 if their nation competed at the Zone Group round robin level for three of the four years or if the player had represented their nation at least twenty times. All players were required to have been part of a nominated team for a Fed/Davis Cup event in 2015 or 2016, and to have had a good standing with their National Olympic Committee.

Each National Olympic Committee (NOC) could enter 6 male and 6 female athletes, with a maximum of 4 entries in the individual events, and 2 pairs in the doubles events. Any player in the world's top 56 was eligible, and NOC's had the option to enter players of a lower rank. Athletes were able to compete in both singles and doubles events. Doubles players within the top 10 rankings on 6 June were eligible to bring any player provided that player had any doubles or singles ranking, and the number of players of the same country did not surpass the total of six.

== Qualified players ==
This is the final list of qualified players as published by the ITF on 5 August 2016.

^{a}	Player did not participate as a result of injury or the choice not to compete
^{b}	Player had not met the minimal Fed/Davis Cup representation level
^{c}	Player was ineligible due to too many players from a certain country
^{d}	Player had retired from the sport
^{e}	Player was suspended from competition
^{f}	Player received special dispensation for the Davis Cup/Fed Cup requirements from the ITF

=== Men's singles ===
No.	Rank	Player	NOC	ATP Points	NOC Rank	Career Davis Cup nom.	Years in Zonal RR	2013–16 Davis Cup nom.	2015–16 Davis Cup nom.
World Ranking
1	1	Novak Djokovic	Serbia	16950	1	23	0	6	2
2	2	Andy Murray	Great Britain	8915	1	20	0	8	5
^{a}	3	Roger Federer	Switzerland	6655	–	27	0	6	1
3^{f}	4	Rafael Nadal	Spain	5405	1	17	0	2	1
^{a}	5	Stan Wawrinka	Switzerland	5305	–	25	0	8	1
4	6	Kei Nishikori	Japan	4290	1	11	0	6	3
^{a}	7	Dominic Thiem	Austria	3105	–	3	0	3	2
5^{f}	7^{PR(223)}	Juan Martín del Potro	Argentina	230	1	11	0	2	1
^{a}	8	Tomáš Berdych	Czech Republic	3030	–	29	0	8	1
^{a}	9	Milos Raonic	Canada	2965	–	13	0	6	1
^{a}	10	Richard Gasquet	France	2725	–	16	0	6	2
6	11	David Goffin	Belgium	2840	1	10	0	9	5
7	12	Jo-Wilfried Tsonga	France	2725	1	17	0	9	3
8	13	Marin Čilić	Croatia	2605	1	17	0	5	2
9	14	David Ferrer	Spain	2560	2	21	0	3	1
10	15	Gaël Monfils	France	2290	2	13	0	6	2
11	16	Roberto Bautista Agut	Spain	2150	3	3	0	4	2
^{a}	17	John Isner	United States	2100	–	12	0	7	3
12	18	Gilles Simon	France	1855	3	11	0	4	3
^{a}	19	Nick Kyrgios	Australia	1855	–	5	0	4	1
^{b}	20	Kevin Anderson	South Africa	1760	–	5	0	0	0
13	21	Viktor Troicki	Serbia	1670	2	19	0	5	3
^{a}^{b}	22	Feliciano López	Spain	1630	–	22	0	2	1
^{a}	23	Bernard Tomic	Australia	1625	–	11	0	6	3
14^{f}	24	Benoît Paire	France	1596	4	0	0	0	0
15	25	Pablo Cuevas	Uruguay	1450	1	20	0	2	1
16	26	Philipp Kohlschreiber	Germany	1450	1	17	0	6	3
17	27	Jack Sock	United States	1415	1	3	0	3	3
^{b}	28	Ivo Karlović	Croatia	1360	–	19	0	0	0
^{B}	29	Lucas Pouille	France	1311	–	1	0	1	1
18	30	João Sousa	Portugal	1275	1	19	0	9	4
^{a}	31	Alexandr Dolgopolov	Ukraine	1260	–	6	0	4	1
19^{f}	32	Albert Ramos-Viñolas	Spain	1190	4	1	0	1	0
^{bc}	33	Jérémy Chardy	France	1175	–	2	0	0	0
20	34	Fabio Fognini	Italy	1170	1	16	0	9	3
21	35	Federico Delbonis	Argentina	1165	2	5	0	5	4
22	36	Grigor Dimitrov	Bulgaria	1150	1	8	0	3	1
^{a}	37	Sam Querrey	United States	1135	–	9	0	6	1
^{a}	38	Alexander Zverev	Germany	1130	–	1	0	1	1
23^{f}	39	Steve Johnson	United States	1110	2	1	0	1	1
24	40	Andreas Seppi	Italy	1095	2	24	0	10	4
^{a}	41	Marcos Baghdatis	Cyprus	1060	–	20	4	3	2
25	42	Andrey Kuznetsov	Russia	1018	1	4	0	4	2
^{b}	43	Pablo Carreño Busta	Spain	995	–	1	0	1	1
26	44	Gilles Müller	Luxembourg	985	1	26	0	3	1
^{bc}	45	Marcel Granollers	Spain	972	–	8	0	3	0
27	46	Vasek Pospisil	Canada	955	1	14	0	8	2
28	46^{PR(94)}	Juan Mónaco	Argentina	620	3	17	0	6	1
^{b}	47	Nicolás Almagro	Spain	944	–	7	0	2	0
29	48	Borna Ćorić	Croatia	935	2	7	0	7	4
^{c}	49	Nicolas Mahut	France	931	–	3	0	3	3
30^{f}	50	Guido Pella	Argentina	928	4	1	0	2	2
^{a}	51	Martin Kližan	Slovakia	925	–	15	0	8	3
^{a}	52	Fernando Verdasco	Spain	900	–	19	0	3	1
^{b}	53	Guillermo García-López	Spain	900	–	1	0	1	0
31	54	Ričardas Berankis	Lithuania	885	1	16	0	8	4
^{b}	55	Adrian Mannarino	France	860	–	0	0	0	0
32^{f}	56	Denis Kudla	United States	858	3	0	0	0	0
33^{f}	56^{PR(596)}	Brian Baker	United States	50	4	0	0	0	0
34	57	Paolo Lorenzi	Italy	855	3	9	0	8	4
^{b}	58	Aljaž Bedene	Great Britain†	845	–	0	0	0	0
^{b}	59	Ernests Gulbis	Latvia	836	–	19	0	5	0
^{b}	60	Paul-Henri Mathieu	France	816	–	6	0	0	0
^{a}	61	Mikhail Kukushkin	Kazakhstan	797	–	17	0	8	3
35	62	Thomaz Bellucci	Brazil	790	1	17	0	7	3
36	63	Malek Jaziri	Tunisia	787	1	19	1	4	3
37	64	Denis Istomin	Uzbekistan	771	1	25	0	8	3
^{b}	65	Taylor Fritz	United States	768	–	0	0	0	0
38^{f}	66	John Millman	Australia	758	1	0	0	0	0
^{a}	67	Jiří Veselý	Czech Republic	758	–	10	0	9	4
39	68	Dudi Sela	Israel	746	1	23	0	7	2
^{c}	69	Diego Schwartzman	Argentina	746	–	3	0	3	3
^{a}	70	Ivan Dodig	Croatia	743	–	14	0	5	3
40	71	Lukáš Rosol	Czech Republic	735	1	16	0	13	4
^{b}	72	Rajeev Ram	United States	733	–	0	0	0	0
41	73	Illya Marchenko	Ukraine	726	1	15	0	7	2
^{b}	74	Íñigo Cervantes	Spain	713	–	0	0	0	0
^{c}	75	Donald Young	United States	712	–	3	0	3	2
^{b}	76	Mikhail Youzhny	Russia	707	–	30	0	0	0
42	77	Evgeny Donskoy	Russia	707	2	6	0	6	4
43	78	Víctor Estrella Burgos	Dominican Republic	705	1	35	0	7	3
^{b}	79	Pierre-Hugues Herbert	France	697	–	1	0	1	1
^{a}	80	Dušan Lajović	Serbia	691	–	6	0	5	2
^{b}	81	Tommy Robredo	Spain	685	–	15	0	2	1
44	81^{PR(328)}	Thanasi Kokkinakis	Australia	145	2	4	0	4	3
45	82	Robin Haase	Netherlands	685	1	17	0	7	2
46	83	Rogério Dutra Silva	Brazil	684	2	6	0	5	1
47^{f}	84	Kyle Edmund	Great Britain	676	2	2	0	2	2
^{c}	85	Leonardo Mayer	Argentina	675	–	9	0	6	4
48^{f}	86	Dustin Brown	Germany	670	2	3	0	2	2
49	87	Damir Džumhur	Bosnia and Herzegovina	667	1	14	0	7	2
50	88	Gastão Elias	Portugal	657	2	13	0	8	3
51^{f}	89	Jan-Lennard Struff	Germany	650	3	2	0	2	1
52^{f}	90	Jordan Thompson	Australia	643	3	0	0	0	0
^{b}	91	Stéphane Robert	France	638	–	0	0	0	0
^{b}	92	Horacio Zeballos	Argentina	634	–	8	0	5	0
^{a}	93	Daniel Evans	Great Britain	621	–	9	0	4	2
53	94^{PR(120)}	Jerzy Janowicz	Poland	506	1	17	0	8	3
^{b}	95	Facundo Bagnis	Argentina	620	–	0	0	0	0
54	96	Teymuraz Gabashvili	Russia	616	3	11	0	5	3
55	97	Lu Yen-hsun	Chinese Taipei	615	1	18	0	3	3
^{a}	98	Karen Khachanov	Russia	589	–	3	0	3	1
^{b}	99	Bjorn Fratangelo	United States	583	–	0	0	0	0
^{a}	100	Sergiy Stakhovsky	Ukraine	566	–	24	0	9	2
56	101	Nikoloz Basilashvili	Georgia	563	1	5	3	3	3
ITF places
57^{f}	106	Yūichi Sugita	Japan	551	2	12	0	4	0
58	108	Taro Daniel	Japan	544	3	3	0	3	2
59	110	Andrej Martin	Slovakia	537	1	6	0	6	3
60^{f}	112	Thomas Fabbiano	Italy	536	4	0	0	0	0
61	113	Radu Albot	Moldova	534	1	16	0	8	2
62	115	Sam Groth	Australia	520	4	5	0	5	4
Tripartite Commission Invitation
63	130	Mirza Bašić	Bosnia and Herzegovina	447	2	19	0	7	4
64	278	Darian King	Barbados	181	1	13	0	9	4

† Aljaž Bedene has previously represented Slovenia, making him ineligible for Great Britain. His nominations for Slovenian Davis Cup team are not counted here.

=== Women's singles ===
No.	Rank	Player	NOC	Current WTA Points	NOC Rank	Career Fed Cup Nom.	Years in Zonal RR^{*}	2013–16 Fed Cup Nom.^{†}	2015–16 Fed Cup Nom.
World Ranking
1	1	Serena Williams	United States	8330	1	10	0	3	2
2	2	Angelique Kerber	Germany	6500	1	13	0	8	4
3	3	Garbiñe Muguruza	Spain	5482	1	3	0	3	3
4	4	Agnieszka Radwańska	Poland	5335	1	16	1	6	2
^{a}	5	Simona Halep	Romania	4792	–	8	1	5	3
^{a}	6	Victoria Azarenka	Belarus	4221	–	12	1	3	3
5	7	Roberta Vinci	Italy	3405	1	29	0	6	2
^{a}	8	Belinda Bencic	Switzerland	3260	–	7	0	4	2
6	9	Venus Williams	United States	3116	2	12	0	3	2
7	10	Timea Bacsinszky	Switzerland	2800	1	19	0	7	4
8	11	Petra Kvitová	Czech Republic	2768	1	19	0	8	3
9	12	Svetlana Kuznetsova	Russia	2755	1	19	0	3	3
^{d}	13	Flavia Pennetta	Italy	2723	–	21	0	2	1
10	14	Samantha Stosur	Australia	2700	1	24	0	7	3
11	15	Carla Suárez Navarro	Spain	2695	2	12	0	4	2
12	16	Madison Keys	United States	2592	3	3	0	3	1
^{a}	17	Karolína Plíšková	Czech Republic	2360	–	5	0	4	4
13	18	Johanna Konta	Great Britain	2250	1	5	3	4	1
14	19	Elina Svitolina	Ukraine	2226	1	6	2	4	1
15	20	Sloane Stephens	United States	2150	4	5	0	3	1
^{a}	21	Dominika Cibulková	Slovakia	2081	–	19	0	5	2
16	22	Sara Errani	Italy	2030	2	20	0	7	3
17	23	Anastasia Pavlyuchenkova	Russia	1960	2	10	0	4	3
^{a}	24	Jelena Janković	Serbia	1940	–	20	1	2	1
18	25	Ana Ivanovic	Serbia	1910	2	12	1	4	1
^{e}	26	Maria Sharapova	Russia	1901	–	6	0	2	2
19	27	Kiki Bertens	Netherlands	1821	1	8	1	6	4
20	27^{PR(265)}	Peng Shuai	China	169	1	10	4	2	1
21	28	Irina-Camelia Begu	Romania	1765	1	9	1	5	3
22	29	Lucie Šafářová	Czech Republic	1673	2	20	0	7	1
23	30	Barbora Strýcová	Czech Republic	1640	3	15	0	5	4
24^{f}	31	Daria Kasatkina	Russia	1618	3	3	0	2	2
25	32	Kristina Mladenovic	France	1550	1	9	0	7	4
26	33	Andrea Petkovic	Germany	1485	2	14	0	7	4
27	34	Caroline Wozniacki	Denmark	1386	1	9	1	3	3
^{a}	35	Yulia Putintseva	Kazakhstan	1385	–	3	3	3	2
28	36	Ekaterina Makarova	Russia	1382	4	9	0	4	1
29	37	Monica Niculescu	Romania	1365	2	12	1	5	3
30	38	Caroline Garcia	France	1365	2	7	0	6	4
31	39	Jeļena Ostapenko	Latvia	1362	1	4	4	4	2
32	40	Anna Karolína Schmiedlová	Slovakia	1340	1	6	0	5	4
33	41	Annika Beck	Germany	1335	3	3	0	3	2
34^{f}	42	Laura Siegemund	Germany	1335	4	0	0	0	0
^{c}	43	Coco Vandeweghe	United States	1302	–	4	0	3	3
^{a}	44	Lesia Tsurenko	Ukraine	1301	–	9	1	5	2
35	45	Tímea Babos	Hungary	1260	1	5	3	3	1
36	45^{PR(93)}	Karin Knapp	Italy	764	3	8	0	4	1
37	46	Misaki Doi	Japan	1230	1	8	1	5	1
^{a}	47	Camila Giorgi	Italy	1230	–	5	0	5	3
38	48	Eugenie Bouchard	Canada	1230	2	7	1	5	1
39	49	Monica Puig	Puerto Rico	1220	1	6	4	2	1
40	50	Yanina Wickmayer	Belgium	1215	1	16	2	4	2
41^{f}	51	Daria Gavrilova	Australia	1120	2	1	0	1	1
^{bc}	52	Anna-Lena Friedsam	Germany	1100	–	0	0	0	0
^{c}	53	Elena Vesnina	Russia	1099	–	15	0	6	3
42	54	Danka Kovinić	Montenegro	1085	1	5	4	2	1
43	55	Johanna Larsson	Sweden	1083	1	16	0	5	1
44	56	Heather Watson	Great Britain	1081	2	7	4	4	2
^{b}	57	Mirjana Lučić-Baroni	Croatia	1058	–	5	4	0	0
^{c}	58	Margarita Gasparyan	Russia	1052	–	3	0	2	2
45	59	Alizé Cornet	France	1035	3	16	0	5	1
^{c}	60	Shelby Rogers	United States	1031	–	0	0	0	0
46	61	Kirsten Flipkens	Belgium	1025	2	22	1	4	2
47	62	Zhang Shuai	China	1009	2	10	4	2	2
^{c}	63	Sabine Lisicki	Germany	1002	–	11	0	5	2
^{b}	64	Kateryna Bondarenko	Ukraine	993	–	13	2	2	2
^{a}	64^{PR(451)}	Galina Voskoboeva	Kazakhstan	67	–	8	3	10	4
^{bc}	65	Varvara Lepchenko	United States	993	–	2	0	2	0
^{bc}	66	Mona Barthel	Germany	975	–	1	0	1	0
^{c}	67	Christina McHale	United States	960	–	8	0	3	2
^{bc}	68	Madison Brengle	United States	950	–	1	0	0	0
48^{f}	69	Nao Hibino	Japan	949	2	1	1	1	1
^{bc}	70	Irina Falconi	United States	945	–	0	0	0	0
49	71	Tsvetana Pironkova	Bulgaria	944	1	15	4	4	2
^{a}	72	Hsieh Su-wei	Chinese Taipei	944	–	9	2	2	2
50	73	Wang Qiang	China	939	3	5	4	4	2
^{bc}	74	Louisa Chirico	United States	930	–	0	0	0	0
^{bc}	75	Nicole Gibbs	United States	906	–	0	0	0	0
51	76	Ana Konjuh	Croatia	899	1	3	4	3	2
52	77	Çağla Büyükakçay	Turkey	899	1	13	4	4	2
ITF places
53	79	Mariana Duque Mariño	Colombia	876	1	12	4	3	1
54	84	Polona Hercog	Slovenia	800	1	9	0	3	3
55	85	Magda Linette	Poland	791	2	3	0	1	1
56	86	Zheng Saisai	China	790	4	2	0	1	1
57	92	Teliana Pereira	Brazil	768	1	8	0	4	2
58	188	Ons Jabeur	Tunisia	287	1	4	0	8	4
Tripartite Commission Invitation
59	136	Verónica Cepede Royg	Paraguay	425	1	10	3	7	3
60	274	Stephanie Vogt	Liechtenstein	161	1	7	4	4	2
Alternates
61	94	Yaroslava Shvedova	Kazakhstan	754	1	8	3	5	2
62	119	Aleksandra Krunić	Serbia	527	3	13	0	7	3
63	157	Lucie Hradecká	Czech Republic	362	4	12	0	6	2
64	158	Andreea Mitu	Romania	361	3	2	1	2	2

^* Years spent exclusively in the Zonal Round robin format during the four-year Olympic cycle

^†Including the 2012 Fed Cup World Group Final

=== Men's doubles ===
No.	CR^{*}	Player A			Player B			NOC
No.	CR^{*}	SR^{†}	DR^{‡}	Name	SR^{†}	DR^{‡}	Name	NOC
World Ranking
1	4	79	3	Pierre-Hugues Herbert^{f}	49	1	Nicolas Mahut	France
2	4	2	142	Andy Murray	–	2	Jamie Murray	Great Britain
3	17	–	11	Florin Mergea	–	6	Horia Tecău	Romania
4	89	82	170	Robin Haase	–	7	Jean-Julien Rojer	Netherlands
5	17	–	8	Marcelo Melo	–	9	Bruno Soares	Brazil
6	56	–	10	Rohan Bopanna	–	46	Leander Paes	India
Other entrants
7	22	4	144	Rafael Nadal^{f}	–	18	Marc López	Spain
8	24	1	154	Novak Djokovic	–	23	Nenad Zimonjić	Serbia
9	27	15	593	Gael Monfils	12	360	Jo-Wilfried Tsonga	France
10	30	16	291	Roberto Bautista Agut	14	–	David Ferrer	Spain
11	33	-	13	Daniel Nestor	46	20	Vasek Pospisil	Canada
12	43	595	22	Łukasz Kubot	–	21	Marcin Matkowski	Poland
13	49	13	357	Marin Čilić	–	36^{PR}	Marin Draganja	Croatia
14	54	–	27	Juan Sebastián Cabal	–	27	Robert Farah	Colombia
15	61	–	49	Chris Guccione	–	12	John Peers	Australia
16	63	–	44	Oliver Marach^{f}	–	19	Alexander Peya	Austria
17	63	39	42	Steve Johnson^{f}	27	24	Jack Sock	United States
18	65	7^{PR}	588	Juan Martín del Potro	140	58	Máximo González^{f}	Argentina
19	74	34	60	Fabio Fognini	40	79	Andreas Seppi	Italy
20	85	56^{PR}	259	Brian Baker^{f}	72	29	Rajeev Ram^{f}	United States
21	86	35	153	Federico Delbonis	1248	51	Guillermo Durán^{f}	Argentina
22	86	–	54	Colin Fleming^{f}	–	32	Dominic Inglot	Great Britain
23	89	–	63	Aliaksandr Bury	–	26	Max Mirnyi	Belarus
^{a}	115	26	186	Philipp Kohlschreiber	89	177	Jan-Lennard Struff	Germany
ITF places
24	102	71	104	Lukáš Rosol	129	31	Radek Štěpánek	Czech Republic
25	107	–	64	Marcus Daniell	915	43	Michael Venus	New Zealand
26	115	62	84	Thomaz Bellucci	–	53	André Sá	Brazil
27	127	–	61	Julio Peralta^{f}	210	66	Hans Podlipnik-Castillo	Chile
28	143	110	74	Andrej Martin	–	69	Igor Zelenay	Slovakia
29	148	73	601	Illya Marchenko	229	75	Denys Molchanov	Ukraine
30	179	–	50	Santiago González	–	129	Miguel Ángel Reyes-Varela	Mexico
31	210	–	105	Sanchai Ratiwatana	–	105	Sonchat Ratiwatana	Thailand
Alternates
32	118	30	99	João Sousa	88	158	Gastão Elias	Portugal

^* Combined Ranking. The best ranking (singles or doubles) of Player A is added to that of Player B to calculate the Combined Ranking.

^† Singles Ranking

^‡ Doubles Ranking

=== Women's doubles ===
No.	CR^{*}	Player A			Player B			NOC
No.	CR^{*}	SR^{†}	DR^{‡}	Name	SR^{†}	DR^{‡}	Name	NOC
World Ranking
1	12	–	1	Martina Hingis	11	363	Timea Bacsinszky	Switzerland
2	191	–	1	Sania Mirza	587	190	Prarthana Thombare	India
3	7	38	3	Caroline Garcia	32	4	Kristina Mladenovic	France
4	11	715	5	Chan Yung-jan	–	6	Chan Hao-ching	Chinese Taipei
5	19	53	7	Elena Vesnina	35	12	Ekaterina Makarova	Russia
6	191	94	8	Yaroslava Shvedova	458	183	Galina Voskoboeva	Kazakhstan
7	29	88	9	Bethanie Mattek-Sands^{f}	30	20	Coco Vandeweghe	United States
8	21	157	10	Lucie Hradecká	207	11	Andrea Hlaváčková	Czech Republic
Other entrants
9	9	1	251	Serena Williams	8	251	Venus Williams	United States
10	14	2	40	Garbiñe Muguruza	12	21	Carla Suárez Navarro	Spain
11	28	7	78	Roberta Vinci	21	25	Sara Errani	Italy
12	34	79	16	Zheng Saisai	277	18	Xu Yifan	China
13	39	10	61	Svetlana Kuznetsova	29	52	Daria Kasatkina	Russia
14	42	4	204	Angelique Kerber	38	126	Andrea Petkovic	Germany
15	44	29	14	Lucie Šafářová	30	42	Barbora Strýcová	Czech Republic
16	53	27	42	Irina-Camelia Begu	37	26	Monica Niculescu	Romania
17	60	–	30	Anabel Medina Garrigues	–	30	Arantxa Parra Santonja	Spain
18	69	–	27	Anna-Lena Grönefeld	42	46	Laura Siegemund	Germany
19	71	20	176	Elina Svitolina	186	51	Olga Savchuk	Ukraine
20	72	16	168	Samantha Stosur	56	201	Daria Gavrilova	Australia
21	74	19	120	Johanna Konta	55	119	Heather Watson	Great Britain
22	80	24	86	Jelena Janković	120	56	Aleksandra Krunić	Serbia
^{a}	89	–	39	Chuang Chia-jung	72	50	Hsieh Su-wei	Chinese Taipei
23	90	63	456	Zhang Shuai	27^{PR}	147	Peng Shuai	China
ITF places
24	92	496	44	Gabriela Dabrowski	48	380	Eugenie Bouchard	Canada
25	110	49	117	Misaki Doi	200	61	Eri Hozumi	Japan
26	132	360	63	Lyudmyla Kichenok	377	69	Nadiia Kichenok	Ukraine
27	135	–	55	Raluca Olaru	158	80	Andreea Mitu	Romania
28	135	–	64	Klaudia Jans-Ignacik	196	71	Paula Kania	Poland
29	136	485	38	Anastasia Rodionova	205	98	Arina Rodionova	Australia
30	209	44	13	Tímea Babos	242	196	Réka Luca Jani	Hungary
31	239	88	–	Teliana Pereira	174	151	Paula Cristina Gonçalves	Brazil
Alternates
32	111	50	512	Yanina Wickmayer	61	111	Kirsten Flipkens	Belgium

^* Combined Ranking. The best ranking (singles or doubles) of Player A is added to that of Player B to calculate the Combined Ranking.

^† Singles Ranking

^‡ Doubles Ranking

=== Mixed doubles ===
No.	CR^{*}	Player A			Player B			NOC
No.	CR^{*}	SR^{†}	DR^{‡}	Name	SR^{†}	DR^{‡}	Name	NOC
World Ranking
1	4	38	3	Caroline Garcia	49	1	Nicolas Mahut	France
2	6	2	30	Garbiñe Muguruza	4	144	Rafael Nadal^{f}	Spain
3	7	32	4	Kristina Mladenovic	79	3	Pierre-Hugues Herbert^{f}	France
4	11	–	1	Sania Mirza	–	10	Rohan Bopanna	India
5	20	18	146	Johanna Konta	–	2	Jamie Murray	Great Britain
6	25	3	–	Agnieszka Radwańska	595	22	Łukasz Kubot	Poland
7	26	14	161	Samantha Stosur	–	12	John Peers	Australia
8	29	15	15	Carla Suárez Navarro	14	–	David Ferrer	Spain
9	33	88	9	Bethanie Mattek-Sands^{f}	27	24	Jack Sock	United States
10	34	27	36	Kiki Bertens	–	7	Jean-Julien Rojer	Netherlands
11	34	28	40	Irina-Camelia Begu	–	6	Horia Tecău	Romania
^{a}	37	37	26	Monica Niculescu	–	11	Florin Mergea	Romania
ITF places
12	38	9	248	Venus Williams	72	29	Rajeev Ram^{f}	United States
13	41	7	82	Roberta Vinci	34	60	Fabio Fognini	Italy
14	41	157	10	Lucie Hradecká	129	31	Radek Štěpánek	Czech Republic
15	100	92	660	Teliana Pereira	–	8	Marcelo Melo	Brazil
Alternates
16	58	56	142	Heather Watson	2	142	Andy Murray	Great Britain

^* Combined Ranking. The best ranking (singles or doubles) of Player A is added to that of Player B to calculate the Combined Ranking.

^† Singles Ranking

^‡ Doubles Ranking
