= Tennis at the 2016 Summer Olympics – Women's singles =

Women's singles
- Tennis at the 2016 Summer Olympics

Final
- Champion: (Puerto Rico) Monica Puig
- Runner-up: (Germany) Angelique Kerber
- Score: 6–4, 4–6, 6–1

Events
Singles	men	women
Doubles	men	women	mixed
Qualification
← 2012 ·	Summer Olympics	· 2020 →

Women's singles tennis at the Games of the XXXI Olympiad
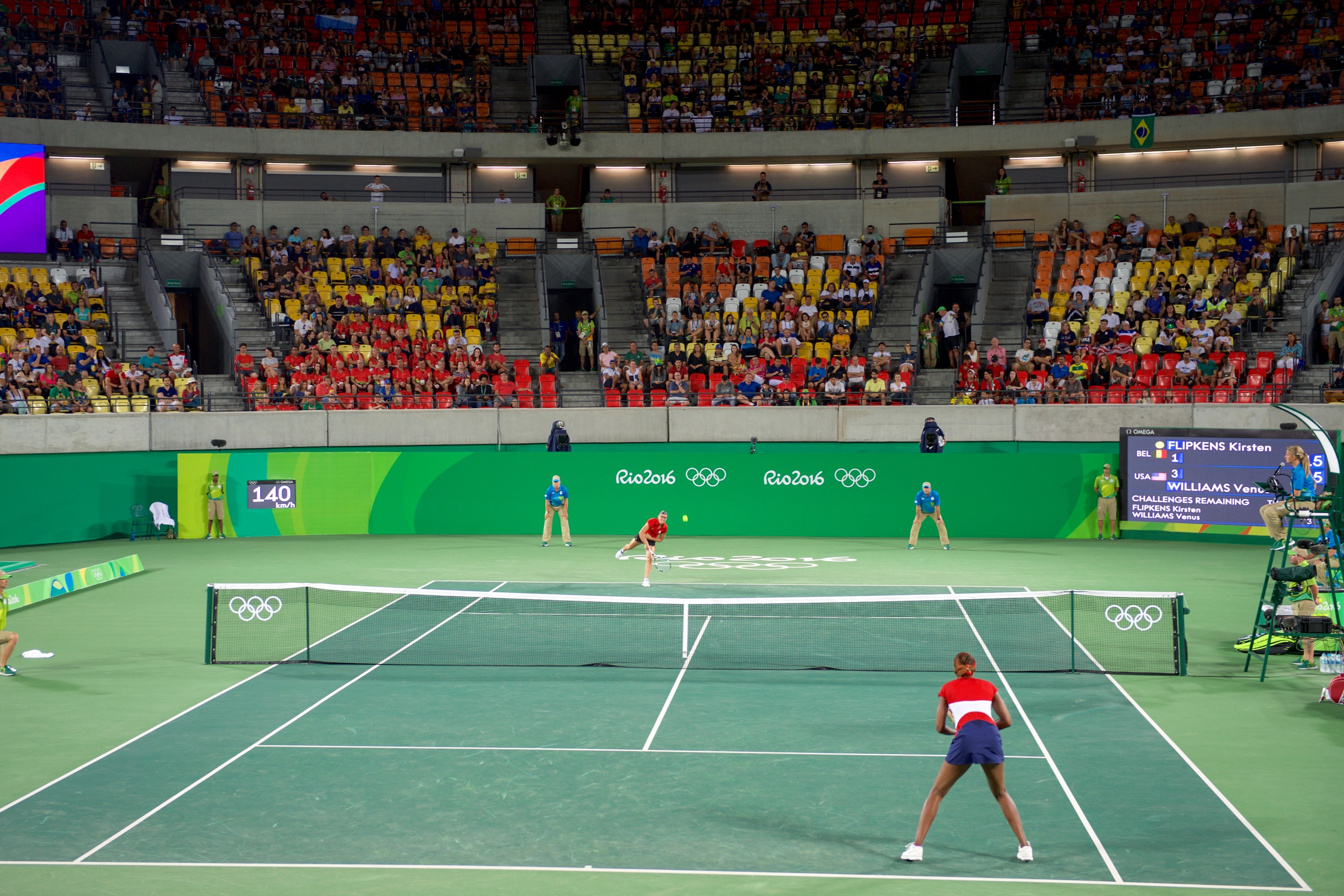
- First-round match between Kirsten Flipkens and Venus Williams
- Venue: Olympic Tennis Centre
- Dates: 6–13 August 2016
- Competitors: 64 from 36 nations

Medalists
1st place, gold medalist(s)		Monica Puig	Puerto Rico
2nd place, silver medalist(s)		Angelique Kerber	Germany
3rd place, bronze medalist(s)		Petra Kvitová	Czech Republic

Puerto Rico's Monica Puig defeated Germany's Angelique Kerber in the final, 6–4, 4–6, 6–1 to win the gold medal in women's singles tennis at the 2016 Summer Olympics. It was Puerto Rico's first Olympic gold medal, and Puig became the first unseeded female player to win the Olympic tennis gold medal. In the bronze medal match, the Czech Republic's Petra Kvitová defeated the United States' Madison Keys 7–5, 2–6, 6–2. It was Germany's first medal in women's singles since 1992 and the Czech Republic's first since 1996.

The tournament was held from 6 to 13 August 2016 at the Olympic Tennis Centre in the Barra Olympic Park in Barra da Tijuca in the west zone of Rio de Janeiro. There were 64 competitors from 36 nations.

== Background ==
This was the 13th appearance of the women's singles tennis. A women's event was held only once during the first three Games (only men's tennis was played in 1896 and 1904), but has been held at every Olympics for which there was a tennis tournament since 1908. Tennis was not a medal sport from 1928 to 1984, though there were demonstration events in 1968 and 1984.

Returning from the 2012 Games were gold medalist Serena Williams of the United States and quarter-finalists Angelique Kerber of Germany, Caroline Wozniacki of Denmark, and Petra Kvitová of the Czech Republic. The 2000 champion, Venus Williams, was also back for her fifth Olympic singles appearance (sister Serena was only on her third). Serena Williams and Kerber were the top two seeds this Games, with Venus #5.

Montenegro and Turkey each made their debut in the event. France made its 12th appearance, most among nations to that point, having missed only the 1908 Games in London (when only British players competed).

== Qualification ==
Qualification for the women's singles was primarily through the WTA ranking list of 6 June 2016. An additional restriction was that players had to have been part of a nominated team for three Billie Jean King Cup events between 2013 and 2016 (with some exceptions). Nations had been limited to four players in the event since the 2000 Games. There were 64 quota places available for women's singles. The first 56 were assigned through the world ranking. There were two Tripartite Commission invitation places and 6 final qualification places allocated by the ITF based on continental and national representation along with world rankings.

== Competition format ==
The competition was a single-elimination tournament with a bronze medal match. Matches were in best-of-3 sets. A tiebreak would be played in all sets reaching 6–6 (previously, no tiebreak would be used in the third set of a match).

== Schedule ==
August
6	7	8	9	10	11	12	13
11:00	11:00	11:00	11:00	—	11:00	12:00	12:00
Round of 64		Round of 32	Round of 16	Play cancelled due to rain	Quarter-finals	Semi-finals	Bronze medal match Gold medal match

== Seeds ==
1. Serena Williams (USA) (third round)
2. Angelique Kerber (GER) (final, silver medalist)
3. Garbiñe Muguruza (ESP) (third round)
4. Agnieszka Radwańska (POL) (first round)
5. Venus Williams (USA) (first round)
6. Roberta Vinci (ITA) (first round)
7. Madison Keys (USA) (semifinals, fourth place)
8. Svetlana Kuznetsova (RUS) (third round)

9. Carla Suárez Navarro (ESP) (third round)
10. Johanna Konta (GBR) (quarterfinals)
11. Petra Kvitová (CZE) (semifinals, bronze medalist)
12. Timea Bacsinszky (SUI) (first round)
13. Samantha Stosur (AUS) (third round)
14. Anastasia Pavlyuchenkova (RUS) (second round)
15. Elina Svitolina (UKR) (quarterfinals)
16. Barbora Strýcová (CZE) (second round)

Click on the seed number of a player to go to their draw section.

== Draw ==
=== Key ===
- Q = Qualifier
- WC = Wild card
- LL = Lucky loser
- Alt = Alternate
- ITF = ITF entry
- PR = Protected ranking
- SR = Special ranking
- SE = Special exempt
- JE = Junior exempt
- JR = Junior Accelerator Programme entrant
- CO = College Accelerator Programme entrant
- NG = Next Gen Accelerator Program entrant
- w/o = Walkover
- r = Retired
- d = Defaulted
- TRI = Tripartite invitation
- IP = ITF place

=== Finals ===
Quarterfinals
15	Elina Svitolina (UKR)	2	0
11	Petra Kvitová (CZE)	6	6
Monica Puig (PUR)	6	6
Laura Siegemund (GER)	1	1
7	Madison Keys (USA)	6	6
Daria Kasatkina (RUS)	3	1
10	Johanna Konta (GBR)	1	2
2	Angelique Kerber (GER)	6	6

Semifinals
11	Petra Kvitová (CZE)	4	6	3
Monica Puig (PUR)	6	1	6
7	Madison Keys (USA)	3	5
2	Angelique Kerber (GER)	6	7

Final (Gold medal match)
Monica Puig (PUR)	6	4	6
2	Angelique Kerber (GER)	4	6	1
Bronze medal match
11	Petra Kvitová (CZE)	7	2	6
7	Madison Keys (USA)	5	6	2

=== Top half ===
==== Section 1 ====
First round
1	S Williams (USA)	6	6
D Gavrilova (AUS)	4	2
J Larsson (SWE)	1	6	3
A Cornet (FRA)	6	2	6
H Watson (GBR)	6	6^{5}	6
PR	S Peng (CHN)	4	7^{7}	3
A Petkovic (GER)	6	1	3
15	E Svitolina (UKR)	2	6	6
11	P Kvitová (CZE)	6	6
T Babos (HUN)	1	2
C Wozniacki (DEN)	6	6
Alt	L Hradecká (CZE)	2	2
E Makarova (RUS)	3	6	7^{8}
Ç Büyükakçay (TUR)	6	0	6^{6}
AK Schmiedlová (SVK)	7	6
6	R Vinci (ITA)	5	4

Second round
1	S Williams (USA)	7^{7}	6
A Cornet (FRA)	6^{5}	2
H Watson (GBR)	3	6	3
15	E Svitolina (UKR)	6	1	6
11	P Kvitová (CZE)	6	6
C Wozniacki (DEN)	2	4
E Makarova (RUS)	3	6	6
AK Schmiedlová (SVK)	6	4	2

Third round
1	S Williams (USA)	4	3
15	E Svitolina (UKR)	6	6
11	P Kvitová (CZE)	4	6	6
E Makarova (RUS)	6	4	4

Quarterfinals
15	E Svitolina (UKR)	2	0
11	P Kvitová (CZE)	6	6

==== Section 2 ====
First round
3	G Muguruza (ESP)	6	6
Alt	A Mitu (ROU)	2	2
N Hibino (JPN)	6	3	6
I-C Begu (ROU)	4	6	3
M Puig (PUR)	6	6
IP	P Hercog (SLO)	3	2
IP	M Linette (POL)	0	3
14	A Pavlyuchenkova (RUS)	6	6
12	T Bacsinszky (SUI)	7^{7}	4	6^{7}
S Zhang (CHN)	6^{4}	6	7^{9}
L Siegemund (GER)	1	6	6
T Pironkova (BUL)	6	4	2
L Šafářová (CZE)	4	6	6
PR	K Knapp (ITA)	6	1	1
K Flipkens (BEL)	4	6	7^{7}
5	V Williams (USA)	6	3	6^{5}

Second round
3	G Muguruza (ESP)	6	6
N Hibino (JPN)	1	1
M Puig (PUR)	6	6
14	A Pavlyuchenkova (RUS)	3	2
S Zhang (CHN)	2	4
L Siegemund (GER)	6	6
L Šafářová (CZE)	2	0^{r}
K Flipkens (BEL)	6	0

Third round
3	G Muguruza (ESP)	1	1
M Puig (PUR)	6	6
L Siegemund (GER)	6	6
K Flipkens (BEL)	4	3

Quarterfinals
M Puig (PUR)	6	6
L Siegemund (GER)	1	1

=== Bottom half ===
==== Section 3 ====
First round
7	M Keys (USA)	6	6
D Kovinić (MNE)	3	3
Alt	A Krunić (SRB)	1	4
K Mladenovic (FRA)	6	6
A Konjuh (CRO)	7^{7}	6
A Beck (GER)	6^{5}	1
A Ivanovic (SRB)	6	1	2
9	C Suárez Navarro (ESP)	2	6	6
16	B Strýcová (CZE)	7^{8}	6
Y Wickmayer (BEL)	6^{6}	1
S Errani (ITA)	4	6	6
K Bertens (NED)	6	4	3
IP	O Jabeur (TUN)	6	6^{4}	1
D Kasatkina (RUS)	3	7^{7}	6
IP	S Zheng (CHN)	6	7
4	A Radwańska (POL)	4	5

Second round
7	M Keys (USA)	7	6^{4}	7^{7}
K Mladenovic (FRA)	5	7^{7}	6^{5}
A Konjuh (CRO)	6^{5}	3
9	C Suárez Navarro (ESP)	7^{7}	6
16	B Strýcová (CZE)	2	2
S Errani (ITA)	6	6
D Kasatkina (RUS)	6	6
IP	S Zheng (CHN)	1	4

Third round
7	M Keys (USA)	6	3	6
9	C Suárez Navarro (ESP)	3	6	3
S Errani (ITA)	5	2
D Kasatkina (RUS)	7	6

Quarterfinals
7	M Keys (USA)	6	6
D Kasatkina (RUS)	3	1

==== Section 4 ====
First round
8	S Kuznetsova (RUS)	6	4	6
Q Wang (CHN)	1	6	0
M Niculescu (ROU)	6	6
TRI	V Cepede Royg (PAR)	2	3
C Garcia (FRA)	6	6
IP	T Pereira (BRA)	1	2
TRI	S Vogt (LIE)	3	1
10	J Konta (GBR)	6	6
13	S Stosur (AUS)	1	6	6
J Ostapenko (LAT)	6	3	2
M Doi (JPN)	6	6
Alt	Y Shvedova (KAZ)	3	4
E Bouchard (CAN)	6	6
S Stephens (USA)	3	3
IP	M Duque Mariño (COL)	3	5
2	A Kerber (GER)	6	7

Second round
8	S Kuznetsova (RUS)	w/o
M Niculescu (ROU)
C Garcia (FRA)	2	3
10	J Konta (GBR)	6	6
13	S Stosur (AUS)	6	6
M Doi (JPN)	3	4
E Bouchard (CAN)	4	2
2	A Kerber (GER)	6	6

Third round
8	S Kuznetsova (RUS)	6	5	5
10	J Konta (GBR)	3	7	7
13	S Stosur (AUS)	0	5
2	A Kerber (GER)	6	7

Quarterfinals
10	J Konta (GBR)	1	2
2	A Kerber (GER)	6	6
