= Tennis at the 2016 Summer Olympics – Men's doubles =

Men's doubles
- Tennis at the 2016 Summer Olympics

Final
- Champions: (Spain) Marc López (Spain) Rafael Nadal
- Runners-up: (Romania) Florin Mergea (Romania) Horia Tecău
- Score: 6–2, 3–6, 6–4

Events
Singles	men	women
Doubles	men	women	mixed
Qualification
- Summer Olympics

Men's doubles tennis at the Games of the XXXI Olympiad
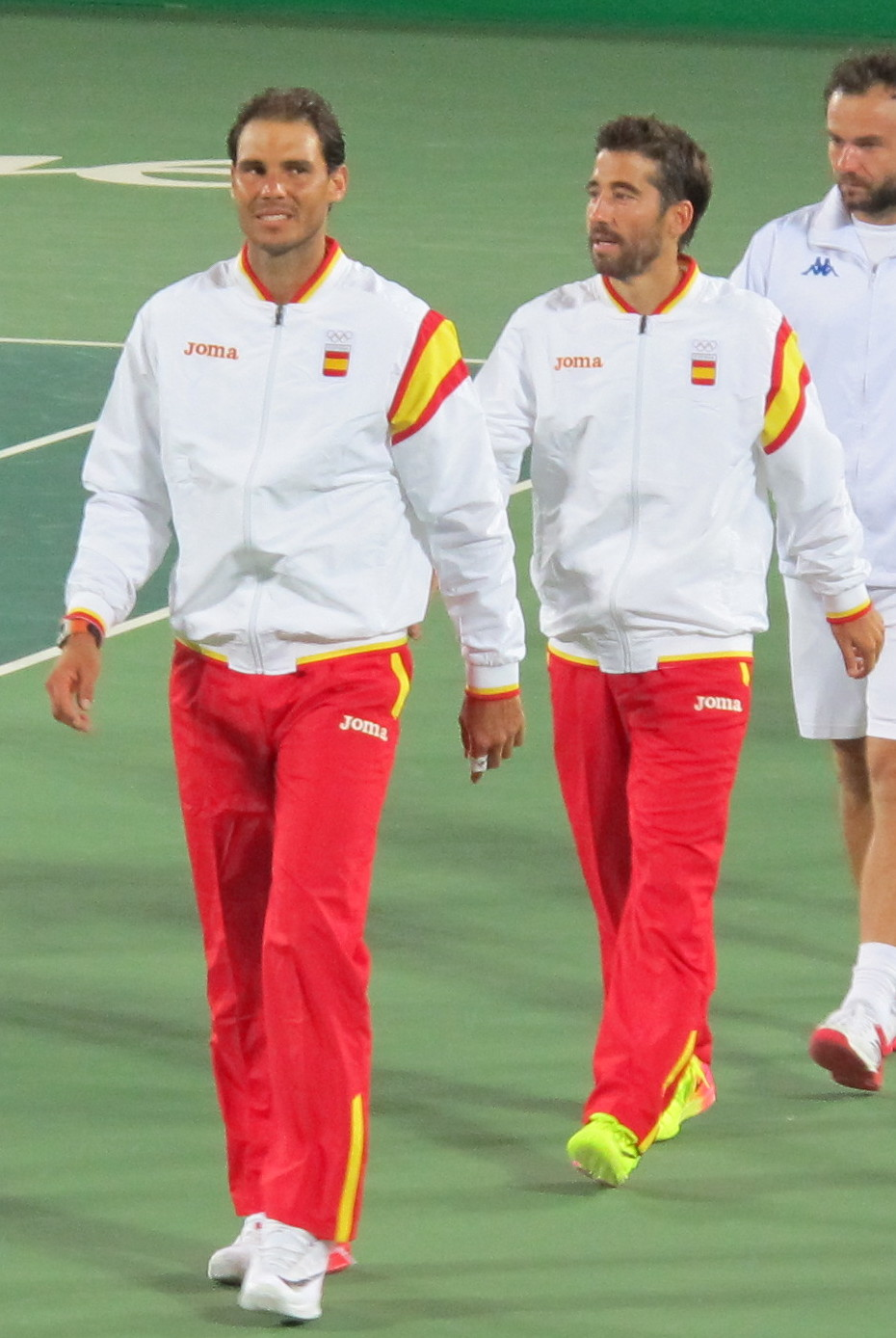
- Rafael Nadal, Marc López and Florin Mergea
- Venue: Olympic Tennis Centre
- Dates: 6–12 August 2016
- Competitors: 32 teams (64 players) from 26 nations

Medalists
1st place, gold medalist(s)		Marc López; Rafael Nadal	Spain
2nd place, silver medalist(s)		Florin Mergea; Horia Tecău	Romania
3rd place, bronze medalist(s)		Steve Johnson; Jack Sock	United States

Spain's Marc López and Rafael Nadal defeated Romania's Florin Mergea and Horia Tecău in the final, 6–2, 3–6, 6–4 to win the gold medal in Men's Doubles tennis at the 2016 Summer Olympics. It was Spain's first victory in men's doubles and its first medal in the event since 2000. Romania won its first men's doubles medal. In the bronze-medal match, the United States' Steve Johnson and Jack Sock (unseeded) defeated Canada's Daniel Nestor and Vasek Pospisil, 6–2, 6–4. It was the United States' third consecutive medal in the event.

The tournament was held at the Olympic Tennis Centre in the Barra Olympic Park in Barra da Tijuca in the west zone of Rio de Janeiro, Brazil from 6–12 August 2016. There were 32 pairs from 26 nations.

The Bryan brothers (Bob and Mike) of the United States were the reigning gold medalists from 2012, but they withdrew before the competition due to health concerns.

== Background ==
This was the 15th appearance of men's doubles tennis. The event has been held at every Summer Olympics where tennis has been on the program: from 1896 to 1924 and then from 1988 to the current program. A demonstration event was held in 1968.

The American reigning champion pair of Bryan brothers, Bob Bryan and Mike Bryan, had been the top seed in the past three Games and would have been again in 2016, but they withdrew. Jo-Wilfried Tsonga of France, silver medal winner in 2012 with Michaël Llodra, returned with a new partner in Gaël Monfils. 2000 gold medalist Daniel Nestor (and career golden slam winner) of Canada competed for a fifth Games with his third different partner. The number one seed thus went to Pierre-Hugues Herbert and Nicolas Mahut of France, with the British Murray brothers Andy Murray and Jamie Murray the number two seed.

Thailand and Ukraine both made their debut in the event. France and Great Britain each made their 12th appearance in the event, tied for most of all nations.

== Qualification ==
Qualification for the men's singles was primarily through the ATP ranking list of 11 June 2016. An additional restriction was that players had to have been part of a nominated team for three Davis Cup events between 2013 and 2016 (with some exceptions). Nations had been able to enter four players (two pairs) in the event since the 2004 Games. Each nation was limited to a total of 6 male players in the singles and doubles events combined, so nations with 4 singles players could add only 2 more in doubles. The men's doubles draw was 32 pairs (64 players).

Doubles players ranked 10 or better qualified directly and could bring any ranked singles or doubles player from their nation as their partner. This resulted in 6 pairs being filled, as 2 pairs consisted of both players in the top 10 and the Bryan brothers declined to use their qualification places.

The draw was then filled to 24 pairs (that is, 18 new pairs) through combined ranking. The better of a player's singles or doubles ranking was used, and the two rankings of a pair of players were added to give a combined ranking, with the lowest rankings earning qualifying spots. (For example, Rafael Nadal was ranked #4 in singles and #144 in doubles and Marc López had no singles ranking and was ranked #18 in doubles; they had a combined ranking of 22, earning the first quota spot through this method.)

The final 8 pairs were selected by the ITF considering both combined ranking (as above) as well as continental and national representation, including host nation places if not qualified (bringing the total number of male tennis players to 86).

== Competition format ==
The competition was a single-elimination tournament with a bronze-medal match. All matches were best-of-three sets. Tiebreaks were used for any set before the third (fifth in the final) that reached 6–6.

== Schedule ==
August
6	7	8	9	10	11	12
11:00	11:00	11:00	11:00	—	11:00	12:00
Round of 32		Round of 16	Quarter-finals	play cancelled due to rain	Semi-finals	Bronze medal match Gold medal match

== Seeds ==
1. Pierre-Hugues Herbert (FRA) / Nicolas Mahut (FRA) (first round)
2. Andy Murray (GBR) / Jamie Murray (GBR) (first round)
3. Marcelo Melo (BRA) / Bruno Soares (BRA) (quarterfinals)
4. Gaël Monfils (FRA) / Jo-Wilfried Tsonga (FRA) (first round)
5. Florin Mergea (ROU) / Horia Tecău (ROU) (final, silver medalists)
6. Marc López (ESP) / Rafael Nadal (ESP) (champions, gold medalists)
7. Daniel Nestor (CAN) / Vasek Pospisil (CAN) (semifinals, fourth place)
8. Roberto Bautista Agut (ESP) / David Ferrer (ESP) (quarterfinals)

== Draw ==
=== Key ===
- INV = Tripartite invitation
- IP = ITF place
- Alt = Alternate
- PR = Protected ranking
- w/o = Walkover
- r = Retired
- d = Defaulted

=== Finals ===
Semifinals
Steve Johnson (USA); Jack Sock (USA)	3	5
5	Florin Mergea (ROU); Horia Tecău (ROU)	6	7
6	Marc López (ESP); Rafael Nadal (ESP)	7^{7}	7^{7}
7	Daniel Nestor (CAN); Vasek Pospisil (CAN)	6^{1}	6^{4}

Final (gold medal match)
5	Florin Mergea (ROU); Horia Tecău (ROU)	2	6	4
6	Marc López (ESP); Rafael Nadal (ESP)	6	3	6
Bronze medal match
Steve Johnson (USA); Jack Sock (USA)	6	6
7	Daniel Nestor (CAN); Vasek Pospisil (CAN)	2	4

=== Top half ===
First round
1	P-H Herbert (FRA); N Mahut (FRA)	6^{4}	3
JS Cabal (COL); R Farah (COL)	7^{7}	6
IP	J Peralta (CHI); H Podlipnik-Castillo (CHI)	2	2
S Johnson (USA); J Sock (USA)	6	6
Ł Kubot (POL); M Matkowski (POL)	6	7^{8}
R Bopanna (IND); L Paes (IND)	4	6^{6}
IP	L Rosol (CZE); R Štěpánek (CZE)	1	4
8	R Bautista Agut (ESP); D Ferrer (ESP)	6	6
3	M Melo (BRA); B Soares (BRA)	6	7^{7}
IP	Sa Ratiwatana (THA); So Ratiwatana (THA)	0	6^{1}
PR	M Čilić (CRO); M Draganja (CRO)	2	2
N Djokovic (SRB); N Zimonjić (SRB)	6	6
IP	S González (MEX); MÁ Reyes-Varela (MEX)	6	6
C Fleming (GBR); D Inglot (GBR)	3	0
F Delbonis (ARG); G Durán (ARG)	3	2
5	F Mergea (ROU); H Tecău (ROU)	6	6

Second round
JS Cabal (COL); R Farah (COL)	4	6^{1}
S Johnson (USA); J Sock (USA)	6	7^{7}
Ł Kubot (POL); M Matkowski (POL)	3	6^{5}
8	R Bautista Agut (ESP); D Ferrer (ESP)	6	7^{7}
3	M Melo (BRA); B Soares (BRA)	6	6
N Djokovic (SRB); N Zimonjić (SRB)	4	4
IP	S González (MEX); MÁ Reyes-Varela (MEX)	3	6^{9}
5	F Mergea (ROU); H Tecău (ROU)	6	7^{11}

Quarter-finals
S Johnson (USA); J Sock (USA)	6	6
8	R Bautista Agut (ESP); D Ferrer (ESP)	4	2
3	M Melo (BRA); B Soares (BRA)	4	7	2
5	F Mergea (ROU); H Tecău (ROU)	6	5	6

Semi-finals
S Johnson (USA); J Sock (USA)	3	5
5	F Mergea (ROU); H Tecău (ROU)	6	7

=== Bottom half ===
First round
6	M López (ESP); R Nadal (ESP)	6	6
R Haase (NED); J-J Rojer (NED)	4	4
PR	JM del Potro (ARG); M González (ARG)	6	7
C Guccione (AUS); J Peers (AUS)	4	5
A Bury (BLR); M Mirnyi (BLR)	6^{4}	5
O Marach (AUT); A Peya (AUT)	7^{7}	7
PR	B Baker (USA); R Ram (USA)	6	6
4	G Monfils (FRA); J-W Tsonga (FRA)	1	4
7	D Nestor (CAN); V Pospisil (CAN)	4	6	7^{8}
IP	M Daniell (NZL); M Venus (NZL)	6	3	6^{6}
Alt	G Elias (POR); J Sousa (POR)	6	6
IP	A Martin (SVK); I Zelenay (SVK)	4	2
IP	I Marchenko (UKR); D Molchanov (UKR)	4	3
F Fognini (ITA); A Seppi (ITA)	6	6
IP	T Bellucci (BRA); A Sá (BRA)	7^{8}	7^{16}
2	A Murray (GBR); J Murray (GBR)	6^{6}	6^{14}

Second round
6	M López (ESP); R Nadal (ESP)	6	5	6
PR	JM del Potro (ARG); M González (ARG)	3	7	2
O Marach (AUT); A Peya (AUT)	6	6^{2}	6
PR	B Baker (USA); R Ram (USA)	4	7^{7}	3
7	D Nestor (CAN); V Pospisil (CAN)	6	6
Alt	G Elias (POR); J Sousa (POR)	1	4
F Fognini (ITA); A Seppi (ITA)	5	7	6
IP	T Bellucci (BRA); A Sá (BRA)	7	5	3

Quarter-finals
6	M López (ESP); R Nadal (ESP)	6	6
O Marach (AUT); A Peya (AUT)	3	1
7	D Nestor (CAN); V Pospisil (CAN)	6	6
F Fognini (ITA); A Seppi (ITA)	3	1

Semi-finals
6	M López (ESP); R Nadal (ESP)	7^{7}	7^{7}
7	D Nestor (CAN); V Pospisil (CAN)	6^{1}	6^{4}
