= Tennis at the 2016 Summer Olympics – Mixed doubles =

Mixed doubles
- Tennis at the 2016 Summer Olympics

Final
- Champions: (United States) Bethanie Mattek-Sands (United States) Jack Sock
- Runners-up: (United States) Venus Williams (United States) Rajeev Ram
- Score: 6–7^{(3–7)}, 6–1, [10–7]

Events
Singles	men	women
Doubles	men	women	mixed
Qualification
- Summer Olympics

Mixed doubles tennis at the Games of the XXXI Olympiad
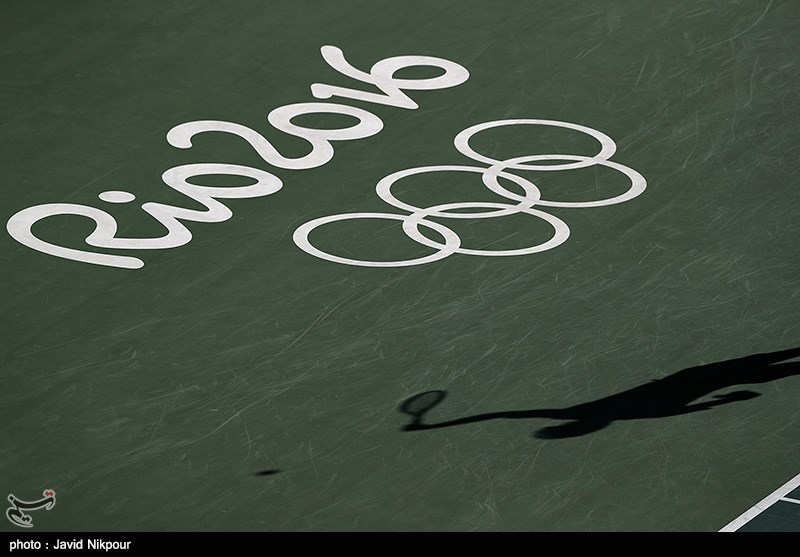
- Tennis at the 2016 Summer Olympics
- Venue: Olympic Tennis Centre
- Dates: 11–14 August 2016
- Competitors: 32 from 12 nations
- Teams: 16

Medalists
1st place, gold medalist(s)		United States: Bethanie Mattek-Sands; Jack Sock
2nd place, silver medalist(s)		United States: Venus Williams; Rajeev Ram
3rd place, bronze medalist(s)		Czech Republic: Lucie Hradecká; Radek Štěpánek

The United States' Bethanie Mattek-Sands and Jack Sock defeated compatriots Venus Williams and Rajeev Ram in the final, 6–7^{(3–7)}, 6–1, [10–7] to win the gold medal in mixed doubles tennis at the 2016 Summer Olympics. In the bronze-medal match, the Czech Republic's Lucie Hradecká and Radek Štěpánek defeated India's Sania Mirza and Rohan Bopanna, 6–1, 7–5. The United States won their first gold medal in the mixed doubles since 1924 and became the first nation to win two gold medals in event, and the Czech Republic won its first medal in the event.

The tournament was held at the Olympic Tennis Centre in the Barra Olympic Park in Barra da Tijuca in the west zone of Rio de Janeiro, Brazil from 10 to 14 August 2016. 30 players (15 pairs) from 12 nations competed (with one Spanish pair withdrawing).

== Background ==
This was the sixth appearance of mixed doubles tennis. The event was first held in 1900 and would not be held again until 1912 (when both outdoor and indoor versions were held); it would then be held the next two Games in 1920 and 1924. Tennis was not a medal sport from 1928 to 1984, though there were demonstration events in 1968 (which included mixed doubles) and 1984 (which did not). Mixed doubles did not return with the rest of the tennis programme in 1988; instead, it was not until 2012 that mixed doubles returned to the programme, where it has been since.

Victoria Azarenka and Max Mirnyi were the defending champions, but they were not able to defend their title as a result of Azarenka's withdrawal due to pregnancy. There was no clear favourite.

Romania made its mixed doubles debut. France and Great Britain each competed for the fifth time, tied for most among nations.

== Qualification ==
Entries for the 16-team mixed doubles event were determined on-site from those players already participating in singles or doubles, with a maximum of two teams per country. Teams had to be nominated by their National Olympic Committee by the deadline of 9 August.

== Competition format ==
The competition was a single-elimination tournament with a bronze-medal match. All matches were best-of-three sets. Tie-breaks were used for the first two sets of each match. If the score was tied at one set all, a 'super tie-break' (the first pairing to win at least 10 points by a margin of two points) would be used.

== Schedule ==
August
10	11	12	13	14
—	12:00	12:00	12:00	12:00
play cancelled due to rain	Round of 16	Quarter-finals	Semi-finals	Bronze medal match Gold medal match

== Seeds ==
1. Caroline Garcia (FRA) / Nicolas Mahut (FRA) (first round)
2. Kristina Mladenovic (FRA) / Pierre-Hugues Herbert (FRA) (first round)
3. Garbiñe Muguruza (ESP) / Rafael Nadal (ESP) (withdrew)
4. Sania Mirza (IND) / Rohan Bopanna (IND) (semifinals, fourth place)

== Draw ==
=== Key ===
- INV = Tripartite invitation
- IP = ITF place
- Alt = Alternate
- PR = Protected ranking
- w/o = Walkover
- r = Retired
- d = Defaulted

=== Bracket ===
Round of 16
1	C Garcia (FRA); N Mahut (FRA)	6^{4}	6^{1}
IP	T Pereira (BRA); M Melo (BRA)	7^{7}	7^{7}
B Mattek-Sands (USA); J Sock (USA)	6	6
J Konta (GBR); J Murray (GBR)	4	3
3	G Muguruza (ESP); R Nadal (ESP)
IP	L Hradecká (CZE); R Štěpánek (CZE)	w/o
A Radwańska (POL); Ł Kubot (POL)	6	6^{1}	[8]
I-C Begu (ROU); H Tecău (ROU)	4	7^{7}	[10]
Alt	H Watson (GBR); A Murray (GBR)	6	6
C Suárez Navarro (ESP); D Ferrer (ESP)	3	3
S Stosur (AUS); J Peers (AUS)	5	4
4	S Mirza (IND); R Bopanna (IND)	7	6
K Bertens (NED); J-J Rojer (NED)	7^{7}	6^{3}	[8]
IP	V Williams (USA); R Ram (USA)	6^{4}	7^{7}	[10]
IP	R Vinci (ITA); F Fognini (ITA)	6	3	[10]
2	K Mladenovic (FRA); P-H Herbert (FRA)	4	6	[8]

Quarterfinals
IP	T Pereira (BRA); M Melo (BRA)	4	4
B Mattek-Sands (USA); J Sock (USA)	6	6
IP	L Hradecká (CZE); R Štěpánek (CZE)	6	7
I-C Begu (ROU); H Tecău (ROU)	4	5
Alt	H Watson (GBR); A Murray (GBR)	4	4
4	S Mirza (IND); R Bopanna (IND)	6	6
IP	V Williams (USA); R Ram (USA)	6	7
IP	R Vinci (ITA); F Fognini (ITA)	3	5

Semifinals
B Mattek-Sands (USA); J Sock (USA)	6	7^{7}
IP	L Hradecká (CZE); R Štěpánek (CZE)	4	6^{3}
4	S Mirza (IND); R Bopanna (IND)	6	2	[3]
IP	V Williams (USA); R Ram (USA)	2	6	[10]

Final (gold-medal match)
B Mattek-Sands (USA); J Sock (USA)	6^{3}	6	[10]
IP	V Williams (USA); R Ram (USA)	7^{7}	1	[7]
Bronze-medal match
IP	L Hradecká (CZE); R Štěpánek (CZE)	6	7
4	S Mirza (IND); R Bopanna (IND)	1	5
