= Tennis at the 2016 Summer Olympics – Men's singles =

Men's singles
- Tennis at the 2016 Summer Olympics

Final
- Champion: (United Kingdom) Andy Murray
- Runner-up: (Argentina) Juan Martín del Potro
- Score: 7–5, 4–6, 6–2, 7–5

Events
Singles	men	women
Doubles	men	women	mixed
Qualification
- Summer Olympics

Men's singles tennis at the Games of the XXXI Olympiad
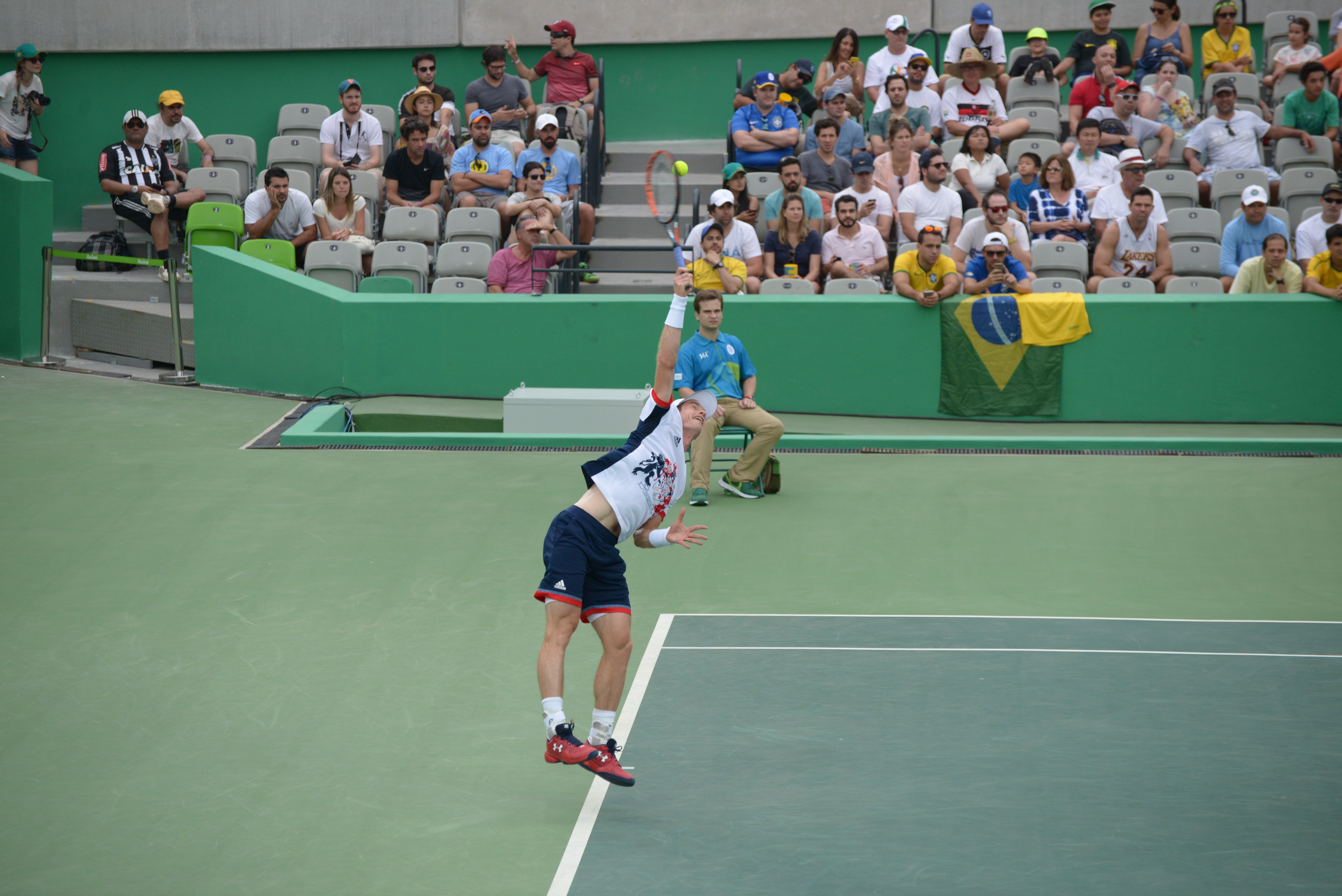
- Andy Murray serving in his first-round match
- Venue: Olympic Tennis Centre
- Dates: 6–14 August 2016
- Competitors: 64 from 34 nations

Medalists
1st place, gold medalist(s)		Andy Murray; Great Britain
2nd place, silver medalist(s)		Juan Martín del Potro; Argentina
3rd place, bronze medalist(s)		Kei Nishikori; Japan

Defending gold medalist Andy Murray of Great Britain defeated Juan Martín del Potro of Argentina in the final, 7–5, 4–6, 6–2, 7–5 to win the gold medal in men's singles tennis at the 2016 Summer Olympics. He became the first tennis player ever, male or female, to win two Olympic gold medals in singles. Murray and del Potro were only the third and fourth men to win multiple singles medals of any color (following del Potro's bronze in 2012). Murray's gold was Great Britain's fifth in men's singles, the most of any nation. In the bronze medal match, Japan's Kei Nishikori defeated Spain's Rafael Nadal, 6–2, 6–7^{(1–7)}, 6–3, earning Japan's first men's singles Olympic medal since 1920.

The tournament was held at the Olympic Tennis Centre in the Barra Olympic Park in Barra da Tijuca in the west zone of Rio de Janeiro, Brazil. The final was played on 14 August 2016. There were 64 players from 34 nations. Notably, this was the first Olympic tournament since the 1984 men's singles, not to feature any Swiss players.

World No. 1 Novak Djokovic lost, in straight sets, to del Potro in the first round. Djokovic was attempting to complete the Career Golden Slam and Career Super Slam; his defeat marked his first loss in the opening round of a tournament since 2009. This was the second consecutive Olympic singles match where del Potro defeated Djokovic, following their encounter in the bronze medal match in 2012.

== Background ==
This was the 15th (medal) appearance of the men's singles tennis event. The event has been held at every Summer Olympics where tennis has been on the program: from 1896 to 1924 and then from 1988 to the current program. Demonstration events were held in 1968 and 1984.

The number one seed was Novak Djokovic of Serbia, making his third Olympic appearance after reaching the semifinals in 2008 (bronze medal) and 2012 (fourth place), Djokovic had been the winner of the first two majors of the year, the Australian and French Open, and was also the reigning U.S. Open champion. The returning Olympic champion and number two seed was Andy Murray of Great Britain, coming off winning his second Wimbledon title, and his first Davis Cup the previous autumn; he had also been runner-up to Djokovic in Melbourne and Paris. Spain's Rafael Nadal, the 2008 gold medalist who was unable to compete in 2012 due to injury, was the third seed. Sidelined with injury this time was Roger Federer of Switzerland (who, like Djokovic, needed only an Olympic gold for a career Golden Slam, although he had a doubles gold from 2008). 2012 bronze medalist Argentinian Juan Martín del Potro returned, as did quarterfinalists Kei Nishikori of Japan (the fourth seed) and Jo-Wilfried Tsonga of France (fifth seed).

Barbados, Bosnia and Herzegovina, the Dominican Republic, Georgia, Lithuania, and Moldova each made their debut in the event. France made its 14th appearance, most among all nations, having missed only the 1904 event.

== Qualification ==
Qualification for the men's singles was primarily through the ATP ranking list of 11 June 2016. An additional restriction was that players had to have been part of a nominated team for three Davis Cup events between 2013 and 2016 (with some exceptions). Nations had been limited to four players in the event since the 2000 Games. There were 64 quota places available for men's singles. The first 56 were assigned through the world ranking. There were two Tripartite Commission invitation places and 6 final qualification places allocated by the ITF based on continental and national representation along with world rankings.

== Competition format ==
The competition was a single-elimination tournament with a bronze medal match. Matches were in best-of-3 sets, except for the final which was in best-of-5 sets. A tiebreak would be played in all sets reaching 6–6 (previously, no tiebreak would be used in the third set of a non-final match or the fifth set of the final).

== Schedule ==
August
6	7	8	9	10	11	12	13	14
11:00	11:00	11:00	11:00	—	11:00	12:00	12:00	12:00
Round of 64		Round of 32		Play cancelled due to rain	Round of 16	Quarter-finals	Semi-finals	Bronze medal match Gold medal match

== Seeds ==
Seeds were based on ATP rankings as of 1 August 2016.

1. Novak Djokovic (SRB) (first round)
2. Andy Murray (GBR) (champion, gold medalist)
3. Rafael Nadal (ESP) (semifinals, fourth place)
4. Kei Nishikori (JPN) (semifinals, bronze medalist)
5. Jo-Wilfried Tsonga (FRA) (second round)
6. Gaël Monfils (FRA) (quarterfinals)
7. David Ferrer (ESP) (second round)
8. David Goffin (BEL) (third round)
9. Marin Čilić (CRO) (third round)
10. Roberto Bautista Agut (ESP) (quarterfinals)
11. Pablo Cuevas (URU) (second round)
12. Steve Johnson (USA) (quarterfinals)
13. Philipp Kohlschreiber (GER) (second round, withdrew due to foot injury)
14. Jack Sock (USA) (first round)
15. Gilles Simon (FRA) (third round)
16. Benoît Paire (FRA) (second round)

Click on the seed number of a player to go to their draw section.

== Draw ==
Players placement onto the table is such that no two players from the same country start within the same quarter section of the table, hence making it impossible for them to meet until the semifinals. This is enabled by the qualification rule that states that no country can bring more than four players for each of the singles tournament. The countries bringing the maximum of four players are Argentina, Australia, France, Italy, Spain and United States. Key

- Q = Qualifier
- WC = Wild card
- LL = Lucky loser
- Alt = Alternate
- ITF = ITF entry
- PR = Protected ranking
- SR = Special ranking
- SE = Special exempt
- JE = Junior exempt
- JR = Junior Accelerator Programme entrant
- CO = College Accelerator Programme entrant
- NG = Next Gen Accelerator Program entrant
- w/o = Walkover
- r = Retired
- d = Defaulted
- TRI = Tripartite Invitation
- IP = ITF place

=== Finals ===
Quarterfinals
PR	Juan Martín del Potro (ARG)	7	7^{7}
10	Roberto Bautista Agut (ESP)	5	6^{4}
3	Rafael Nadal (ESP)	2	6	6
Thomaz Bellucci (BRA)	6	4	2
6	Gaël Monfils (FRA)	6^{4}	6	6^{6}
4	Kei Nishikori (JPN)	7^{7}	4	7^{8}
12	Steve Johnson (USA)	0	6	6^{2}
2	Andy Murray (GBR)	6	4	7^{7}

Semifinals
PR	Juan Martín del Potro (ARG)	5	6	7^{7}
3	Rafael Nadal (ESP)	7	4	6^{5}
4	Kei Nishikori (JPN)	1	4
2	Andy Murray (GBR)	6	6

Final (gold medal match)
PR	Juan Martín del Potro (ARG)	5	6	2	5
2	Andy Murray (GBR)	7	4	6	7
Bronze medal match
3	Rafael Nadal (ESP)	2	7^{7}	3
4	Kei Nishikori (JPN)	6	6^{1}	6

=== Top half ===
==== Section 1 ====
First round
1	N Djokovic (SRB)	6^{4}	6^{2}
PR	JM del Potro (ARG)	7^{7}	7^{7}
J Sousa (POR)	6	7
R Haase (NED)	1	5
J Thompson (AUS)	4	2
K Edmund (GBR)	6	6
IP	T Daniel (JPN)	6	6
14	J Sock (USA)	4	4
10	R Bautista Agut (ESP)	6^{4}	6	0
A Kuznetsov (RUS)	7^{7}	2	0^{r}
Y-h Lu (TPE)	6	3	4
P Lorenzi (ITA)	3	6	6
G Müller (LUX)	5	6	7^{12}
PR	J Janowicz (POL)	7	1	6^{10}
M Jaziri (TUN)	6	5	3
5	J-W Tsonga (FRA)	4	7	6

Second round
PR	JM del Potro (ARG)	6	1	6
J Sousa (POR)	3	6	3
K Edmund (GBR)	4	5
IP	T Daniel (JPN)	6	7
10	R Bautista Agut (ESP)	7^{7}	6
P Lorenzi (ITA)	6^{2}	2
G Müller (LUX)	6	6
5	J-W Tsonga (FRA)	4	3

Third round
PR	JM del Potro (ARG)	6^{4}	6	6
IP	T Daniel (JPN)	7^{7}	1	2
10	R Bautista Agut (ESP)	6	7^{7}
G Müller (LUX)	4	6^{4}

Quarterfinals
PR	JM del Potro (ARG)	7	7^{7}
10	R Bautista Agut (ESP)	5	6^{4}

==== Section 2 ====
First round
3	R Nadal (ESP)	6	6
F Delbonis (ARG)	2	1
A Seppi (ITA)	6	3	7^{8}
I Marchenko (UKR)	3	6	6^{6}
PR	B Baker (USA)	7	5	4
IP	Y Sugita (JPN)	5	7	6
B Ćorić (CRO)	4	6^{1}
15	G Simon (FRA)	6	7^{7}
11	P Cuevas (URU)	6	6^{8}	6
N Basilashvili (GEO)	3	7^{10}	3
D Brown (GER)	6	4^{r}
T Bellucci (BRA)	4	5
D Džumhur (BIH)	4	4
D Sela (ISR)	6	6
IP	S Groth (AUS)	4	2
8	D Goffin (BEL)	6	6

Second round
3	R Nadal (ESP)	6	6
A Seppi (ITA)	3	3
IP	Y Sugita (JPN)	6^{3}	2
15	G Simon (FRA)	7^{7}	6
11	P Cuevas (URU)	2	6	3
T Bellucci (BRA)	6	4	6
D Sela (ISR)	3	3
8	D Goffin (BEL)	6	6

Third round
3	R Nadal (ESP)	7^{7}	6
15	G Simon (FRA)	6^{5}	3
T Bellucci (BRA)	7^{12}	6
8	D Goffin (BEL)	6^{10}	4

Quarterfinals
3	R Nadal (ESP)	2	6	6
T Bellucci (BRA)	6	4	2

=== Bottom half ===
==== Section 3 ====
First round
6	G Monfils (FRA)	6	6
V Pospisil (CAN)	1	3
R Dutra Silva (BRA)	7^{7}	6
IP	T Fabbiano (ITA)	6^{4}	1
IP	R Albot (MDA)	4	6	6
T Gabashvili (RUS)	6	4	4
G Dimitrov (BUL)	1	4
9	M Čilić (CRO)	6	6
13	P Kohlschreiber (GER)	4	6	6
G Pella (ARG)	6	1	2
D Kudla (USA)	0	3
IP	A Martin (SVK)	6	6
R Berankis (LTU)	0	0
J Millman (AUS)	6	6
A Ramos Viñolas (ESP)	2	4
4	K Nishikori (JPN)	6	6

Second round
6	G Monfils (FRA)	6	6
R Dutra Silva (BRA)	2	4
IP	R Albot (MDA)	3	4
9	M Čilić (CRO)	6	6
13	P Kohlschreiber (GER)
IP	A Martin (SVK)	w/o
J Millman (AUS)	6^{4}	4
4	K Nishikori (JPN)	7^{7}	6

Third round
6	G Monfils (FRA)	6^{6}	6	6
9	M Čilić (CRO)	7^{8}	3	4
IP	A Martin (SVK)	2	2
4	K Nishikori (JPN)	6	6

Quarterfinals
6	G Monfils (FRA)	6^{4}	6	6^{6}
4	K Nishikori (JPN)	7^{7}	4	7^{8}

==== Section 4 ====
First round
7	D Ferrer (ESP)	6	6
D Istomin (UZB)	2	1
E Donskoy (RUS)	6	6
J-L Struff (GER)	3	4
G Elias (POR)	7^{7}	7^{7}
PR	T Kokkinakis (AUS)	6^{4}	6^{3}
TRI	D King (BAR)	3	2
12	S Johnson (USA)	6	6
16	B Paire (FRA)	3	6	6
L Rosol (CZE)	6	3	4
F Fognini (ITA)	2	7^{7}	6
V Estrella Burgos (DOM)	6	6^{4}	0
PR	J Mónaco (ARG)	6	6
TRI	M Bašić (BIH)	2	2
V Troicki (SRB)	3	2
2	A Murray (GBR)	6	6

Second round
7	D Ferrer (ESP)	6	6^{1}	5
E Donskoy (RUS)	3	7^{7}	7
G Elias (POR)	3	4
12	S Johnson (USA)	6	6
16	B Paire (FRA)	6	4	6^{5}
F Fognini (ITA)	4	6	7^{7}
PR	J Mónaco (ARG)	3	1
2	A Murray (GBR)	6	6

Third round
E Donskoy (RUS)	1	1
12	S Johnson (USA)	6	6
F Fognini (ITA)	1	6	3
2	A Murray (GBR)	6	2	6

Quarterfinals
12	S Johnson (USA)	0	6	6^{2}
2	A Murray (GBR)	6	4	7^{7}
