= Tennis at the 2016 Summer Olympics – Women's doubles =

Women's doubles
- Tennis at the 2016 Summer Olympics

Final
- Champions: (Russia) Ekaterina Makarova (Russia) Elena Vesnina
- Runners-up: (Switzerland) Timea Bacsinszky (Switzerland) Martina Hingis
- Score: 6–4, 6–4

Events
Singles	men	women
Doubles	men	women	mixed
Qualification
- Summer Olympics

Women's doubles tennis at the Games of the XXXI Olympiad
- Venue: Olympic Tennis Centre
- Date: 6–14 August 2016
- Competitors: 32 teams from 22 nations

Medalists
1st place, gold medalist(s)		Ekaterina Makarova; Elena Vesnina	Russia
2nd place, silver medalist(s)		Timea Bacsinszky; Martina Hingis	Switzerland
3rd place, bronze medalist(s)		Lucie Šafářová; Barbora Strýcová	Czech Republic

Russia's Ekaterina Makarova and Elena Vesnina defeated Switzerland's Timea Bacsinszky and Martina Hingis in the final, 6–4, 6–4 to win the gold medal in Women's Doubles tennis at the 2016 Summer Olympics. In the bronze-medal match, the Czech Republic's Lucie Šafářová and Barbora Strýcová defeated compatriots Andrea Hlaváčková and Lucie Hradecká, 7–5, 6–1.

The tournament was held at the Olympic Tennis Centre in the Barra Olympic Park in Barra da Tijuca in the west zone of Rio de Janeiro, Brazil from 6–14 August 2016.

The United States' Serena Williams and Venus Williams were the two-time reigning gold medalists and top seeds, but they lost in the first round to Šafářová and Strýcová. The defeat ended the Williams sisters' 15 match winning streak in women's doubles at the Olympics, and marked their first loss together in Olympic competition.

Hingis attempted to complete the career Golden Slam; she was originally to partner with Belinda Bencic but eventually partnered with Bacsinszky instead after Bencic had withdrawn due to an ongoing wrist injury.

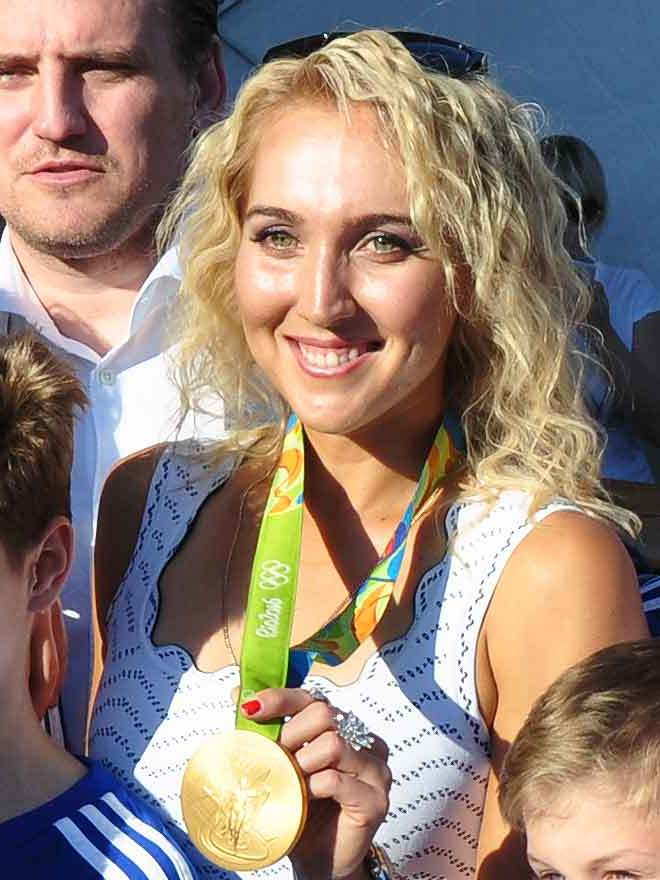
Elena Vesnina with her gold medal

== Schedule ==
August
6	7	8	9	10	11	12	13	14
11:00	11:00	11:00	11:00	—	12:00	12:00	12:00	12:00
Round of 32		Round of 16		play cancelled due to rain	Quarterfinals	Semi-finals	Bronze medal match	Gold medal match

== Seeds ==
1. Serena Williams (USA) / Venus Williams (USA) (first round)
2. Caroline Garcia (FRA) / Kristina Mladenovic (FRA) (first round)
3. Chan Hao-ching (TPE) / Chan Yung-jan (TPE) (quarterfinals)
4. Garbiñe Muguruza (ESP) / Carla Suárez Navarro (ESP) (quarterfinals)
5. Timea Bacsinszky (SUI) / Martina Hingis (SUI) (final, silver medalists)
6. Andrea Hlaváčková (CZE) / Lucie Hradecká (CZE) (semifinals, fourth place)
7. Ekaterina Makarova (RUS) / Elena Vesnina (RUS) (champions, gold medalists)
8. Sara Errani (ITA) / Roberta Vinci (ITA) (quarterfinals)

== Draw ==
=== Key ===
- INV = Tripartite invitation
- IP = ITF place
- Alt = Alternate
- PR = Protected ranking
- w/o = Walkover
- r = Retired
- d = Defaulted

=== Finals ===
Semifinals
Lucie Šafářová (CZE); Barbora Strýcová (CZE)	6^{7}	4
7	Ekaterina Makarova (RUS); Elena Vesnina (RUS)	7^{9}	6
5	Timea Bacsinszky (SUI); Martina Hingis (SUI)	5	7^{7}	6
6	Andrea Hlaváčková (CZE); Lucie Hradecká (CZE)	7	6^{3}	2

Final (gold-medal match)
7	Ekaterina Makarova (RUS); Elena Vesnina (RUS)	6	6
5	Timea Bacsinszky (SUI); Martina Hingis (SUI)	4	4
Bronze-medal match
Lucie Šafářová (CZE); Barbora Strýcová (CZE)	7	6
6	Andrea Hlaváčková (CZE); Lucie Hradecká (CZE)	5	1

=== Top half ===
First round
1	S Williams (USA); V Williams (USA)	3	4
L Šafářová (CZE); B Strýcová (CZE)	6	6
IP	K Jans-Ignacik (POL); P Kania (POL)	4	7	3
IP	E Bouchard (CAN); G Dabrowski (CAN)	6	5	6
IP	L Kichenok (UKR); N Kichenok (UKR)	0	3
Y Xu (CHN); S Zheng (CHN)	6	6
A Kerber (GER); A Petkovic (GER)	2	2
8	S Errani (ITA); R Vinci (ITA)	6	6
4	G Muguruza (ESP); C Suárez Navarro (ESP)	7^{8}	6
IP	PC Gonçalves (BRA); T Pereira (BRA)	6^{6}	2
Y Shvedova (KAZ); G Voskoboeva (KAZ)	1	0^{r}
Alt	K Flipkens (BEL); Y Wickmayer (BEL)	6	0
IP	T Babos (HUN); RL Jani (HUN)	3	4
IP	A Mitu (ROU); R Olaru (ROU)	6	6
IP	An Rodionova (AUS); Ar Rodionova (AUS)	1	2
7	E Makarova (RUS); E Vesnina (RUS)	6	6

Second round
L Šafářová (CZE); B Strýcová (CZE)	6^{4}	6	6
IP	E Bouchard (CAN); G Dabrowski (CAN)	7^{7}	2	4
Y Xu (CHN); S Zheng (CHN)	2	3
8	S Errani (ITA); R Vinci (ITA)	6	6
4	G Muguruza (ESP); C Suárez Navarro (ESP)	7	2	6
Alt	K Flipkens (BEL); Y Wickmayer (BEL)	5	6	2
IP	A Mitu (ROU); R Olaru (ROU)	1	4
7	E Makarova (RUS); E Vesnina (RUS)	6	6

Quarterfinals
L Šafářová (CZE); B Strýcová (CZE)	4	6	6
8	S Errani (ITA); R Vinci (ITA)	6	4	4
4	G Muguruza (ESP); C Suárez Navarro (ESP)	3	4
7	E Makarova (RUS); E Vesnina (RUS)	6	6

Semifinals
L Šafářová (CZE); B Strýcová (CZE)	6^{7}	4
7	E Makarova (RUS); E Vesnina (RUS)	7^{9}	6

=== Bottom half ===
First round
5	T Bacsinszky (SUI); M Hingis (SUI)	6	4	6
D Gavrilova (AUS); S Stosur (AUS)	4	6	2
A Medina Garrigues (ESP); A Parra Santonja (ESP)	1	1
B Mattek-Sands (USA); C Vandeweghe (USA)	6	6
J Konta (GBR); H Watson (GBR)	6	6
J Janković (SRB); A Krunić (SRB)	2	1
I-C Begu (ROU); M Niculescu (ROU)	7	4	3
3	H-c Chan (TPE); Y-j Chan (TPE)	5	6	6
6	A Hlaváčková (CZE); L Hradecká (CZE)	7^{7}	1	6
O Savchuk (UKR); E Svitolina (UKR)	6^{1}	6	4
PR	S Peng (CHN); S Zhang (CHN)	7^{8}	5	7
S Mirza (IND); P Thombare (IND)	6^{6}	7	5
D Kasatkina (RUS); S Kuznetsova (RUS)	6	6
A-L Grönefeld (GER); L Siegemund (GER)	1	4
IP	M Doi (JPN); E Hozumi (JPN)	6	0	6
2	C Garcia (FRA); K Mladenovic (FRA)	0	6	4

Second round
5	T Bacsinszky (SUI); M Hingis (SUI)	6	6
B Mattek-Sands (USA); C Vandeweghe (USA)	4	4
J Konta (GBR); H Watson (GBR)	6	0	4
3	H-c Chan (TPE); Y-j Chan (TPE)	3	6	6
6	A Hlaváčková (CZE); L Hradecká (CZE)	6	6
PR	S Peng (CHN); S Zhang (CHN)	4	4
D Kasatkina (RUS); S Kuznetsova (RUS)	6	1	6
IP	M Doi (JPN); E Hozumi (JPN)	4	6	1

Quarterfinals
5	T Bacsinszky (SUI); M Hingis (SUI)	6	6
3	H-c Chan (TPE); Y-j Chan (TPE)	3	0
6	A Hlaváčková (CZE); L Hradecká (CZE)	6	4	7
D Kasatkina (RUS); S Kuznetsova (RUS)	1	6	5

Semifinals
5	T Bacsinszky (SUI); M Hingis (SUI)	5	7^{7}	6
6	A Hlaváčková (CZE); L Hradecká (CZE)	7	6^{3}	2
