= Tennis at the 2016 Summer Olympics =

- Date: 6–14 August 2016
- Edition: 17th
- Surface: Hard (GreenSet Cushion)
- Location: Olympic Tennis Centre

Champions

Men's singles
- Andy Murray (GBR)

Women's singles
- Monica Puig (PUR)

Men's doubles
- Marc López & Rafael Nadal (ESP)

Women's doubles
- Ekaterina Makarova & Elena Vesnina (RUS)

Mixed doubles
- Bethanie Mattek-Sands & Jack Sock (USA)
- Summer Olympics

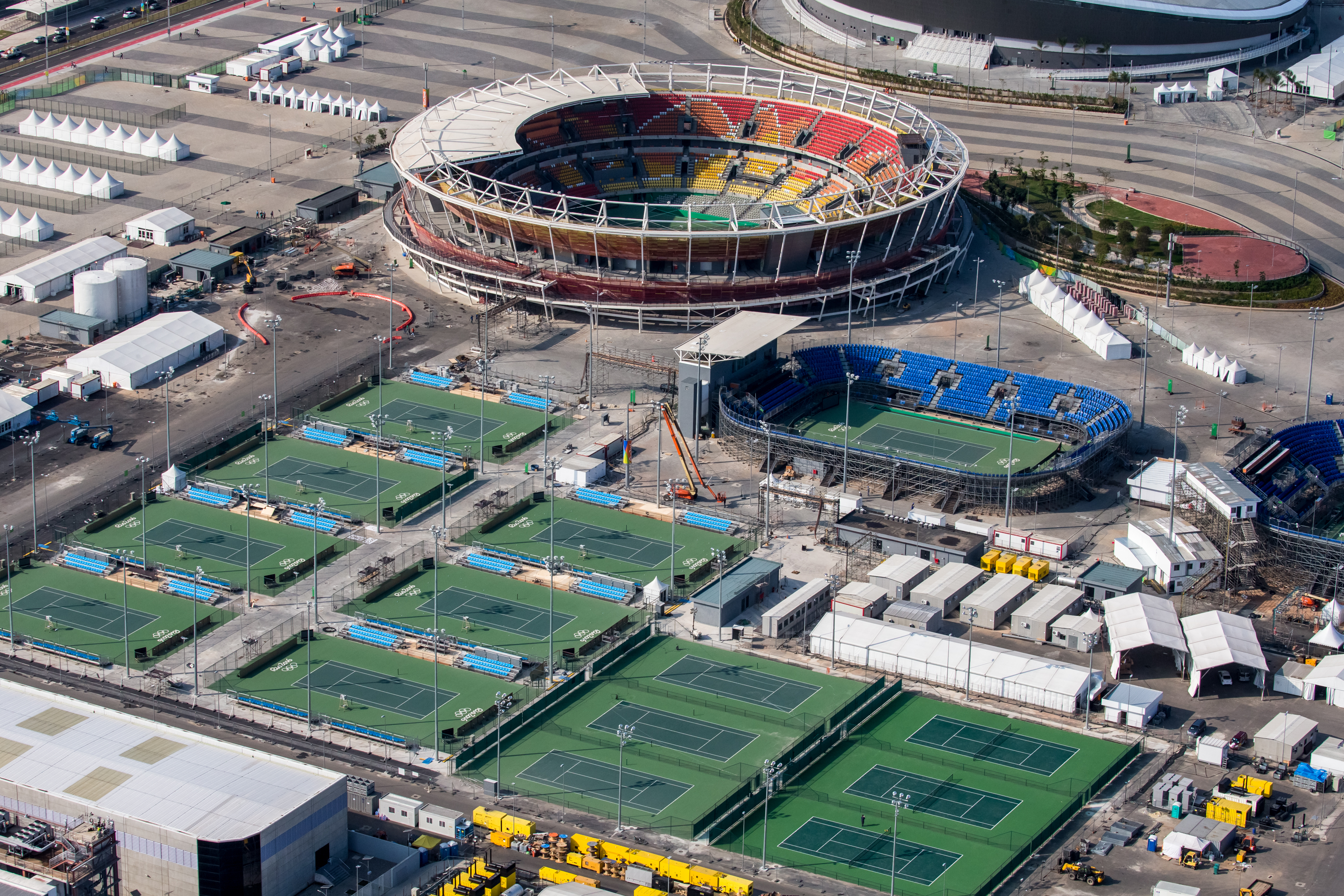
Olympic Tennis Centre, in Barra Olympic Park

The tennis tournament at the 2016 Summer Olympics was held at the Olympic Tennis Centre from 6 to 14 August. The competition was played on a fast hardcourt surface used in numerous North American tournaments that aims to minimize disruption for players.

Initially a total of 172 players were expected to compete in five events: singles and doubles for both men and women and the return of the mixed doubles for the second consecutive time. However, eventually 105 male and 94 female players were granted places in the draws. The Olympic tennis events were run and organized by the Brazilian Olympic Committee (COB) and the International Tennis Federation (ITF), and were part of the Association of Tennis Professionals (ATP) and Women's Tennis Association (WTA) tours.

The 2016 Olympic tournament was the fifteenth edition of tennis at the Olympics (excluding the two Olympics, 1968 and 1984, when tennis was a demonstration event), and the eighth since 1988, when the sport was officially brought back into the Games. Unlike previous editions of the Olympic event, it was decided that the Olympic tournaments would not offer ATP and WTA ranking points for the players.

== Summary ==
Serena Williams was the defending champion in the women's singles, but she lost to Elina Svitolina in the third round. Unseeded Puerto Rican Monica Puig won the gold medal, defeating Germany's world number two Angelique Kerber in the final, 6–4, 4–6, 6–1. This marked Puerto Rico's first ever Olympic gold medal and made Puig her country's first ever female medalist.

In the men's singles, British flagbearer Andy Murray was the defending champion from the London tournament at Wimbledon, while Novak Djokovic was the number one seed and aiming to complete the Career Golden Slam. However, he was defeated in the first round by Argentina's Juan Martín del Potro. Murray defended his title, defeating del Potro in the final, 7–5, 4–6, 6–2, 7–5. With the victory, Murray became the first player, male or female, to win singles gold at two consecutive Olympics and the first player to defend an Olympic title since Serena and Venus Willams won the women's doubles title in Beijing and London. This, combined with a second Wimbledon title, becoming the first-ever three-time BBC Sports Personality of the Year and ending the year as the #1-ranked player by the ATP after having led Great Britain to their first Davis Cup since 1936 in 2015, contributed to his being knighted in the New Year's Honours List.

Serena and Venus Williams were the two-time defending champions and number one seeds in the women's doubles, but they lost in the first round to Czech pairing Lucie Šafářová and Barbora Strýcová. The defeat ended the sisters' 15 match winning streak in women's doubles at the Olympics, and also marked their first loss together in Olympic competition. Russian duo Ekaterina Makarova and Elena Vesnina won the gold medal, defeating Timea Bacsinszky and Martina Hingis in the final, 6–4, 6–4. Martina Hingis had been attempting to become just the fifth woman to complete the Career Golden Slam in doubles.

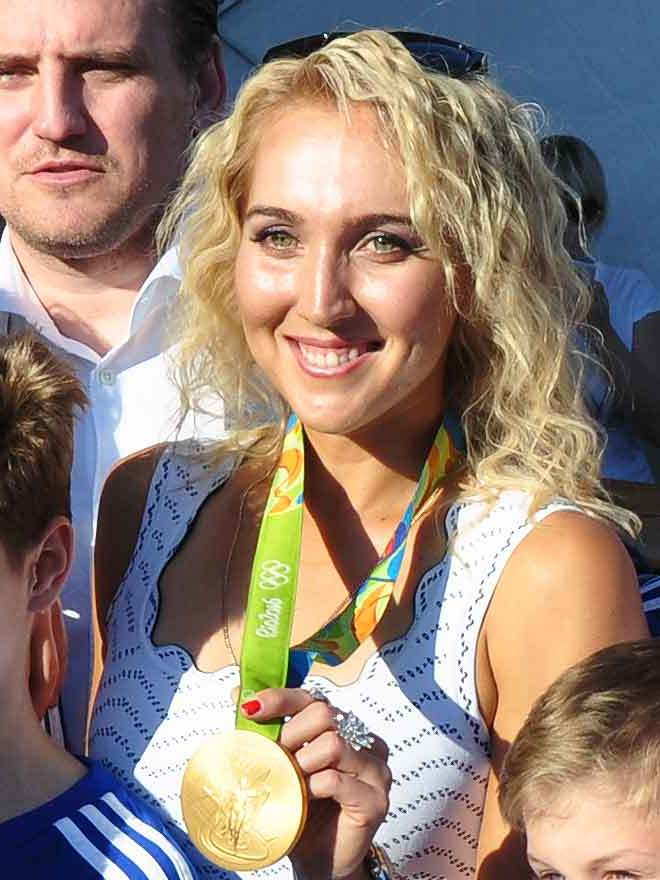
Elena Vesnina with her gold medal

In the men's doubles, Bob and Mike Bryan were the defending champions, but they withdrew before the competition as a result of health concerns. French duo Pierre-Hugues Herbert and Nicolas Mahut were the number one seeds, but lost in the first round to Juan Sebastian Cabal and Robert Farah from Colombia. Spaniards Marc López and Rafael Nadal won the gold medal, defeating Romanian duo Florin Mergea and Horia Tecău in the final, 6–2, 3–6, 6–4.

Victoria Azarenka and Max Mirnyi were the defending champions in the mixed doubles tournament, but they were not able to defend their title as a result of Azarenka's withdrawal due to pregnancy. American pair Bethanie Mattek-Sands and Jack Sock won the gold medal, defeating their compatriots Venus Williams and Rajeev Ram in the final, 6–7^{(3–7)}, 6–1, [10–7].

== Medal summary ==
=== Events ===
| Event | Gold | Silver | Bronze |
|---|---|---|---|
| Men's singles | Andy Murray; Great Britain | Juan Martín del Potro; Argentina | Kei Nishikori; Japan |
| Men's doubles | Spain; Marc López; Rafael Nadal | Romania; Florin Mergea; Horia Tecău | United States; Steve Johnson; Jack Sock |
| Women's singles | Monica Puig; Puerto Rico | Angelique Kerber; Germany | Petra Kvitová; Czech Republic |
| Women's doubles | Russia; Ekaterina Makarova; Elena Vesnina | Switzerland; Timea Bacsinszky; Martina Hingis | Czech Republic; Lucie Šafářová; Barbora Strýcová |
| Mixed doubles | United States; Bethanie Mattek-Sands; Jack Sock | United States; Venus Williams; Rajeev Ram | Czech Republic; Lucie Hradecká; Radek Štěpánek |

=== Medal table ===
| Rank | NOC | Gold | Silver | Bronze | Total |
|---|---|---|---|---|---|
| 1 | United States | 1 | 1 | 1 | 3 |
| 2 | Great Britain | 1 | 0 | 0 | 1 |
| 2 | Puerto Rico | 1 | 0 | 0 | 1 |
| 2 | Russia | 1 | 0 | 0 | 1 |
| 2 | Spain | 1 | 0 | 0 | 1 |
| 6 | Argentina | 0 | 1 | 0 | 1 |
| 6 | Germany | 0 | 1 | 0 | 1 |
| 6 | Romania | 0 | 1 | 0 | 1 |
| 6 | Switzerland | 0 | 1 | 0 | 1 |
| 10 | Czech Republic | 0 | 0 | 3 | 3 |
| 11 | Japan | 0 | 0 | 1 | 1 |
| Totals (11 entries) | | 5 | 5 | 5 | 15 |

== Qualification ==
For the singles competitions, the top 56 players in the world rankings on 6 June 2016 of the WTA and ATP tours are qualified for the Olympics. However, entry has been limited to four players from a country. This means that players who are ranked in the top 56 but represent the NOCs with four higher-ranked players already participating do not qualify, allowing players who are ranked outside of the top 56 but from countries with fewer than four players already qualified to compete. Of the remaining eight slots, six of them will be determined by the ITF's Olympic Committee, taking into account ranking and spread of nations represented, while the final two slots are awarded by the IOC to players from small nations.

In the doubles competitions, 24 teams are automatically qualified for the Games based on the rankings to be published on 6 June 2016, subject to a maximum of two teams per NOC. Players in the top ten of the doubles rankings could reserve a place, provided they had a partner to compete with. Meanwhile, the remaining eight teams were decided by the ITF Olympic Committee.

A player could only participate if he or she was available to be drafted to represent the player's country in Davis Cup or Fed Cup for two of the following years: 2013, 2014, 2015, and 2016, with one of the years being either 2015 or 2016.

== Competition format ==
The tennis competition at the Olympic Games consisted of a single elimination tournament. The size of the singles draw, 64, meant that there were six rounds of competition in total, with five in the doubles owing to its smaller draw size of 32, and 4 for mixed with its draw size only being 16. Players reaching the semifinal were assured of an opportunity to compete for a medal, with the two losing semifinalists contesting a bronze medal match.

All matches were the best of three sets, except for the men's singles final which was the best of five sets. The tie break operated in every set, including the final one (a first for the Olympics). In the mixed doubles the third set was played as a match tie-break (10 points).

== Schedule ==
| Date | 6 August | 7 August | 8 August | 9 August | 10 August | 11 August | 12 August | 13 August | 14 August |
| Day | Saturday | Sunday | Monday | Tuesday | Wednesday | Thursday | Friday | Saturday | Sunday |
| Start time | 11:00 | 11:00 | 11:00 | 11:00 | — | 11:00 | 12:00 | 12:00 | 12:00 |
|---|---|---|---|---|---|---|---|---|---|
| Men's singles | Round of 64 | | Round of 32 | | play cancelled due to rain | Round of 16 | Quarterfinals | Semifinals | Bronze & final |
| Women's singles | Round of 64 | | Round of 32 | Round of 16 | play cancelled due to rain | Quarterfinals | Semifinals | Bronze & final | — |
| Men's doubles | Round of 32 | | Round of 16 | Quarterfinals | play cancelled due to rain | Semifinals | Bronze & final | — | — |
| Women's doubles | Round of 32 | | Round of 16 | | play cancelled due to rain | Quarterfinals | Semifinals | Bronze | Final |
| Mixed doubles | — | — | — | — | play cancelled due to rain | Round of 16 | Quarterfinals | Semifinals | Bronze & final |

== Singles seeds ==
=== Men's singles ===
| Seed | Rank | Player | Status |
|---|---|---|---|
| 1 | 1 | Novak Djokovic; Serbia | First round, lost to Juan Martín del Potro; Argentina |
| 2 | 2 | Andy Murray; Great Britain (gold) | Won Gold medal match against Juan Martín del Potro; Argentina |
| 3 | 5 | Rafael Nadal; Spain | Lost semi-final to Juan Martín del Potro; Argentina; Lost Bronze medal match to Kei Nishikori; Japan |
| 4 | 6 | Kei Nishikori; Japan (bronze) | Lost semi-final to Andy Murray; Great Britain; Won Bronze medal match against Rafael Nadal; Spain |
| 5 | 9 | Jo-Wilfried Tsonga; France | Second round, lost to Gilles Müller; Luxembourg |
| 6 | 11 | Gaël Monfils; France | Quarterfinal, lost to Kei Nishikori; Japan |
| 7 | 12 | David Ferrer; Spain | Second round, lost to Evgeny Donskoy; Russia |
| 8 | 13 | David Goffin; Belgium | Third round, lost to Thomaz Bellucci; Brazil |
| 9 | 14 | Marin Čilić; Croatia | Third round, lost to Gaël Monfils; France |
| 10 | 16 | Roberto Bautista Agut; Spain | Quarterfinal, lost to Juan Martín del Potro; Argentina |
| 11 | 21 | Pablo Cuevas; Uruguay | Second round, lost to Thomaz Bellucci; Brazil |
| 12 | 22 | Steve Johnson; United States | Quarterfinal, lost to Andy Murray; Great Britain |
| 13 | 23 | Philipp Kohlschreiber; Germany | Second round, lost to Andrej Martin; Slovakia |
| 14 | 25 | Jack Sock; United States | First round, lost to Taro Daniel; Japan |
| 15 | 31 | Gilles Simon; France | Third round, lost to Rafael Nadal; Spain |
| 16 | 32 | Benoit Paire; France | Second round, lost to Fabio Fognini; Italy |

The following players received an ITF invitation:

- Nikoloz Basilashvili
  Georgia
- Yūichi Sugita
  Japan
- Taro Daniel
  Japan
- Andrej Martin
  Slovakia
- Thomas Fabbiano
  Italy
- Radu Albot
  Moldova

The following players received a Tripartite Commission invitation:

- Mirza Bašić
  Bosnia and Herzegovina
- Darian King
  Barbados

The following players were originally in the entry list and supposed to be seeded but withdrew prior to the event:

- Roger Federer (SUI) – Knee injury
- Stan Wawrinka (SUI) – Back injury
- Milos Raonic (CAN) – Anxiety over Zika virus situation
- Tomáš Berdych (CZE) – Anxiety over Zika virus situation
- Richard Gasquet (FRA) – Back injury

=== Women's singles ===
| Seed | Rank | Player | Status |
|---|---|---|---|
| 1 | 1 | Serena Williams; United States | Third round, lost to Elina Svitolina; Ukraine |
| 2 | 2 | Angelique Kerber; Germany | Lost Gold medal match to Monica Puig; Puerto Rico |
| 3 | 4 | Garbiñe Muguruza; Spain | Third round, lost to Monica Puig; Puerto Rico |
| 4 | 5 | Agnieszka Radwańska; Poland | First round, lost to Zheng Saisai; China |
| 5 | 6 | Venus Williams; United States | First round, lost to Kirsten Flipkens; Belgium |
| 6 | 8 | Roberta Vinci; Italy | First round, lost to Anna Karolína Schmiedlová; Slovakia |
| 7 | 9 | Madison Keys; United States | Lost Bronze medal match to Petra Kvitová; Czech Republic |
| 8 | 10 | Svetlana Kuznetsova; Russia | Third round, lost to Johanna Konta; Great Britain |
| 9 | 12 | Carla Suárez Navarro; Spain | Third round, lost to Madison Keys; United States |
| 10 | 13 | Johanna Konta; Great Britain | Quarterfinal, lost to Angelique Kerber; Germany |
| 11 | 14 | Petra Kvitová; Czech Republic | Won Bronze medal match against Madison Keys; United States |
| 12 | 15 | Timea Bacsinszky; Switzerland | First round, lost to Zhang Shuai; China |
| 13 | 18 | Samantha Stosur; Australia | Third round, lost to Angelique Kerber; Germany |
| 14 | 19 | Anastasia Pavlyuchenkova; Russia | Second round, lost to Monica Puig; Puerto Rico |
| 15 | 20 | Elina Svitolina; Ukraine | Quarterfinal, lost to Petra Kvitová; Czech Republic |
| 16 | 21 | Barbora Strýcová; Czech Republic | Second round, lost to Sara Errani; Italy |

The following players received an ITF invitation:

- Mariana Duque Mariño
  Colombia
- Polona Hercog
  Slovenia
- Magda Linette
  Poland
- Zheng Saisai
  China
- Teliana Pereira
  Brazil
- Ons Jabeur
  Tunisia

The following players received a Tripartite Commission invitation:

- Verónica Cepede Royg
  Paraguay
- Stephanie Vogt
  Liechtenstein

The following players were originally in the entry list and supposed to be seeded but withdrew prior to the event:

- Simona Halep (ROU) – Health concerns
- Victoria Azarenka (BLR) – Pregnancy
- Belinda Bencic (SUI) – Wrist injury
- Karolína Plíšková (CZE) – Health concerns
- Dominika Cibulková (SVK) – Leg injury

== Doubles seeds ==
=== Men's doubles ===
| Seed | Rank | Team | Status |
|---|---|---|---|
| 1 | 3 | Pierre-Hugues Herbert & Nicolas Mahut; France | First round, lost to Juan Sebastian Cabal & Robert Farah; Colombia |
| 2 | 6 | Andy Murray & Jamie Murray; Great Britain | First round, lost to Thomaz Bellucci & André Sá; Brazil |
| 3 | 11 | Marcelo Melo & Bruno Soares; Brazil | Quarterfinal, lost to Florin Mergea & Horia Tecău; Romania |
| 4 | 20 | Gael Monfils & Jo-Wilfried Tsonga; France | First round, lost to Brian Baker & Rajeev Ram; United States |
| 5 | 24 | Florin Mergea & Horia Tecău; Romania | Lost Gold medal match to Marc López & Rafael Nadal; Spain |
| 6 | 26 | Marc López & Rafael Nadal; Spain | Won Gold medal match against Florin Mergea & Horia Tecău; Romania |
| 7 | 27 | Daniel Nestor & Vasek Pospisil; Canada | Lost Bronze medal match to Steve Johnson & Jack Sock; United States |
| 8 | 28 | Roberto Bautista Agut & David Ferrer; Spain | Quarterfinal, lost to Steve Johnson & Jack Sock; United States |

The following players received an ITF invitation:

- Lukáš Rosol & Radek Štěpánek
  Czech Republic
- Marcus Daniell & Michael Venus
  New Zealand
- Thomaz Bellucci & André Sá
  Brazil
- Julio Peralta & Hans Podlipnik-Castillo
  Chile
- Andrej Martin & Igor Zelenay
  Slovakia
- Illya Marchenko & Denys Molchanov
  Ukraine
- Santiago González & Miguel Ángel Reyes-Varela
  Mexico
- Sanchai Ratiwatana & Sonchat Ratiwatana
  Thailand

=== Women's doubles ===
| Seed | Rank | Team | Status |
|---|---|---|---|
| 1 | 7 | Serena Williams & Venus Williams; United States | First round, lost to Lucie Šafářová & Barbora Strýcová; Czech Republic |
| 2 | 7 | Caroline Garcia & Kristina Mladenovic; France | First round, lost to Misaki Doi & Eri Hozumi; Japan |
| 3 | 12 | Chan Yung-jan & Chan Hao-ching; Chinese Taipei | Quarterfinal, lost to Martina Hingis & Timea Bacsinszky; Switzerland |
| 4 | 16 | Garbiñe Muguruza & Carla Suárez Navarro; Spain | Quarterfinal, lost to Elena Vesnina & Ekaterina Makarova; Russia |
| 5 | 16 | Martina Hingis & Timea Bacsinszky; Switzerland | Lost Gold medal match to Elena Vesnina & Ekaterina Makarova; Russia |
| 6 | 20 | Lucie Hradecká & Andrea Hlaváčková; Czech Republic | Lost Bronze medal match to Lucie Šafářová & Barbora Strýcová; Czech Republic |
| 7 | 22 | Elena Vesnina & Ekaterina Makarova; Russia | Won Gold medal match against Martina Hingis & Timea Bacsinszky; Switzerland |
| 8 | 32 | Sara Errani & Roberta Vinci; Italy | Quarterfinal, lost to Lucie Šafářová & Barbora Strýcová; Czech Republic |

The following players received an ITF invitation:

- Gabriela Dabrowski & Eugenie Bouchard
  Canada
- Misaki Doi & Eri Hozumi
  Japan
- Lyudmyla Kichenok & Nadiia Kichenok
  Ukraine
- Raluca Olaru & Andreea Mitu
  Romania
- Tímea Babos & Réka Luca Jani
  Hungary
- Zhang Shuai & Peng Shuai
  China
- Teliana Pereira & Paula Cristina Gonçalves
  Brazil
- Klaudia Jans-Ignacik & Paula Kania
  Poland

=== Mixed doubles ===
| Seed | Rank | Team | Status |
|---|---|---|---|
| 1 | 4 | Caroline Garcia & Nicolas Mahut; France | First round, lost to Teliana Pereira & Marcelo Melo; Brazil |
| 2 | 6 | Kristina Mladenovic & Pierre-Hugues Herbert; France | First round, lost to Roberta Vinci & Fabio Fognini; Italy |
| 3 | 9 | Garbiñe Muguruza & Rafael Nadal; Spain | First round, withdrew |
| 4 | 16 | Sania Mirza & Rohan Bopanna; India | Lost Bronze medal match to Lucie Hradecká & Radek Štěpánek; Czech Republic |

== See also ==
- Wheelchair tennis at the 2016 Summer Paralympics
