= Lucie Hradecká =

Czech tennis player (born 1985)

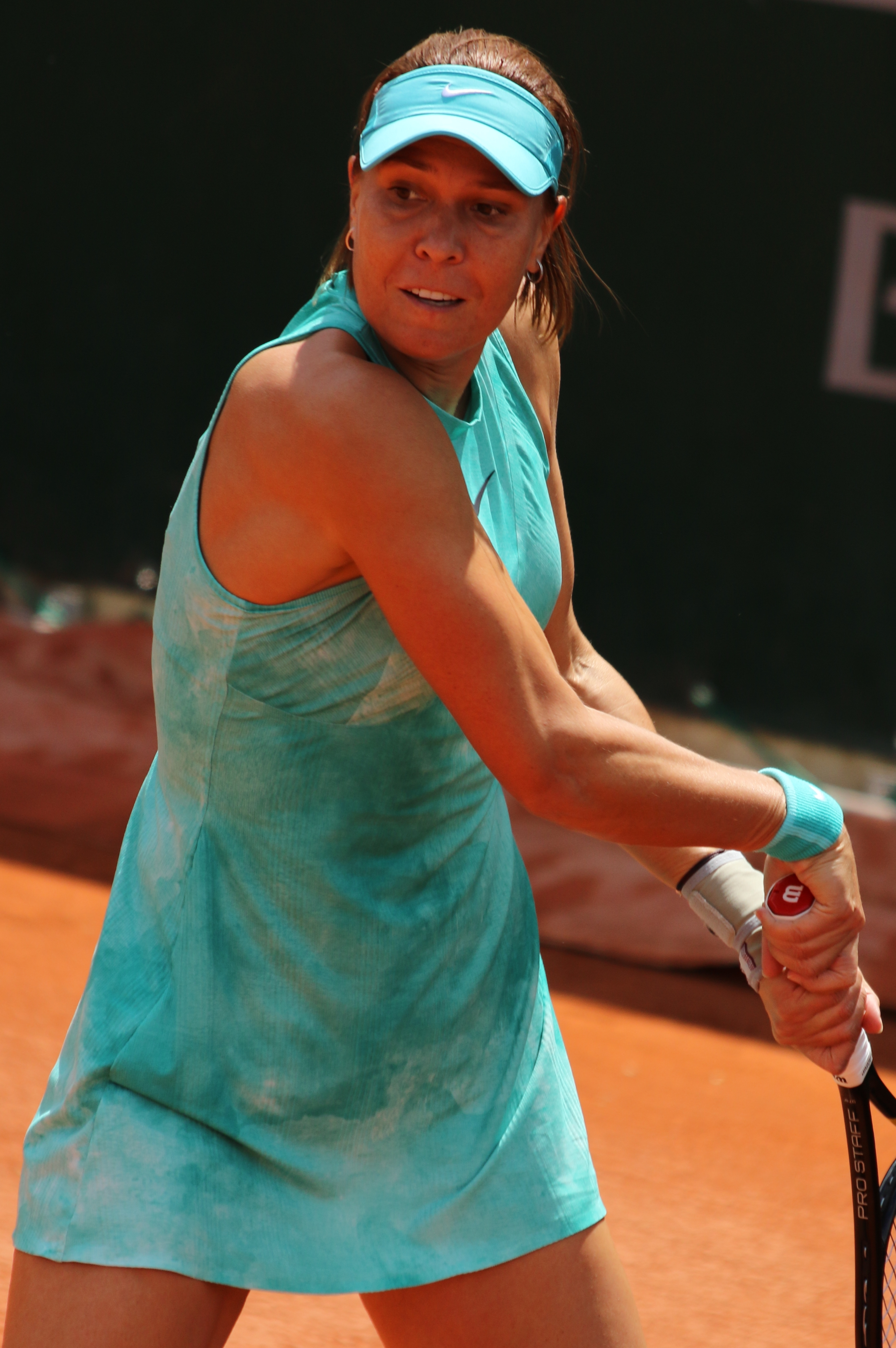
- Hradecká at the 2019 French Open
- Country (sports): Czech Republic
- Residence: Prague, Czech Republic
- Born: 21 May 1985 (age 41) Prague, Czechoslovakia
- Height: 1.77 m (5 ft 10 in)
- Turned pro: 2004
- Retired: October 2022
- Plays: Right-handed (two-handed both sides)
- Prize money: US$ 6,023,175

Singles
- Career record: 515–358
- Career titles: 20 ITF
- Highest ranking: No. 41 (6 June 2011)

Grand Slam singles results
- Australian Open: 3R (2015)
- French Open: 2R (2009, 2011, 2015)
- Wimbledon: 1R (2009, 2010, 2011, 2012, 2013, 2015)
- US Open: 2R (2012)

Other tournaments
- Olympic Games: 1R (2016)

Doubles
- Career record: 622–291
- Career titles: 26
- Highest ranking: No. 4 (22 October 2012)

Grand Slam doubles results
- Australian Open: F (2016)
- French Open: W (2011)
- Wimbledon: F (2012)
- US Open: W (2013)

Other doubles tournaments
- Tour Finals: F (2012)
- Olympic Games: F (2012)

Grand Slam mixed doubles results
- Australian Open: F (2013)
- French Open: W (2013)
- Wimbledon: 3R (2017)
- US Open: SF (2012)

Other mixed doubles tournaments
- Olympic Games: Bronze (2016)

Team competitions
- Fed Cup: W (2011, 2012, 2014, 2015, 2016), record 7–5
Medal record
Representing Czech Republic
Olympic Games
| Silver medal – second place | 2012 London | Doubles |
| Bronze medal – third place | 2016 Rio de Janeiro | Mixed doubles |

Lucie Hradecká (Czech pronunciation: [ˈlutsɪjɛ ˈɦradɛtskaː]; born 21 May 1985) is a Czech former professional tennis player. A three-time Grand Slam doubles champion and 26-time WTA Tour doubles titlist, she reached her career-high doubles ranking of world No. 4 in October 2012. She was also an integral member of the Czech Republic's national team and helped her country to win five titles at the Fed Cup (now Billie Jean King Cup) between 2011 and 2016, in addition to winning two Olympic medals in both women's doubles with Andrea Sestini Hlaváčková in 2012 and in mixed doubles with Radek Štěpánek in 2016. Hradecká also reached the top 45 in singles and was a finalist in seven tour-level singles tournaments. She announced her retirement from the sport at the end of the 2022 season.

In 2006, Hradecká won her first WTA Tour title in doubles in 2006 with partner Renata Voráčová at the Slovenia Open. Five years later, she made her breakthrough at the Grand Slam tournaments when she won her first of two women's doubles major titles at the 2011 French Open with Hlaváčková. In 2012, despite losing her next two major finals, she won the silver medal at the Summer Olympics and won her first WTA Premier 5 (now WTA 1000) title in Cincinnati, both with Hlaváčková. Her continued success led her to a second major title at the US Open in the following year before placing runner-up at the 2016 Australian Open and 2017 US Open.

Hradecká was also an accomplished mixed-doubles player, having won the 2013 French Open with František Čermák in addition to reaching two finals at the 2013 Australian Open (with Čermák) and the 2015 French Open (with Marcin Matkowski) and the mixed-doubles bronze in 2016 with Štěpánek.

In singles, Hradecká achieved her highest ranking on the WTA Tour of world No. 41 in June 2011. She reached her first final in 2008 at the Austrian Open and reached six additional finals but did not win them. Her best result at a major was at the 2015 Australian Open, where she defeated former world No. 1, Ana Ivanovic, en route to the third round.

== Career ==
=== 2002–2008: Career beginnings, first pro tour titles ===
She won her first doubles title on the WTA Tour in 2006 at Portorož with partner Renata Voráčová as the fourth-seeded team. In the final, the Czech team defeated Eva Birnerová and Émilie Loit, the second seeds, by walkover. They also had a victory over the top-seeds Maria Elena Camerin and Emmanuelle Gagliardi in the semifinals.

As qualifiers, she reached the third round of doubles competition with Hana Šromová at the 2006 Wimbledon Championships, then lost to fifth seeds Meghann Shaughnessy and Anna-Lena Grönefeld. En route, they defeated 12th-seeds Svetlana Kuznetsova and Amélie Mauresmo, the previous year's Wimbledon runner-ups by walkover.

In 2007, she made the doubles semifinals of the Indian Wells Open tournament with Voráčová. En route, the team defeated Janette Husárová and Meghann Shaughnessy, the seventh seeds, in the first round, and third-seeded Virginia Ruano Pascual and Paola Suárez in three sets in the quarterfinals, and then lost to top seeds Lisa Raymond and Samantha Stosur.

Later that year, Hradecká and Voráčová won at Bad Gastein, beating Ágnes Szávay and Vladimíra Uhlířová. They also won the 2007 Portorož title, beating Elena Likhovtseva and Andreja Klepač in the finals.

Hradecká reached her first singles final at Bad Gastein in July 2008, where, as a qualifier, she got to the final, but lost to the fourth-seed Pauline Parmentier 4–6, 4–6. She also reached the doubles final.

=== 2009–11: 2011 French Open doubles champion, top 50 singles debut ===
Hradecká won the same tournament, defeating Paula Ormaechea in the final.

She paired with Andrea Hlaváčková to win her first Grand Slam title at the French Open, defeating Sania Mirza and Elena Vesnina in the final.

=== 2012: Wimbledon doubles final, Olympic silver medal, world No. 4 ===
In Estoril, Hradecká qualified for Madrid. She caused the two biggest upsets in the tournament by beating the world No. 4 Petra Kvitová (who was the defending champion) and the world No. 5, Samantha Stosur on the way to her first semifinals at the Premier level, where she lost to Serena Williams in straight sets.

Hradecká and Andrea Hlaváčková reached their second Grand Slam final at Wimbledon, losing to the Williams sisters. Hradecká and Andrea Hlaváčková wons the silver medal in women's aboubles at the Summer Olympics in London.

=== 2013: French Open mixed doubles champion ===
Partnering František Čermák, Hradecká reached the mixed doubles final at the Australian Open and won the French Open.

=== 2015–16: Singles success, Australian Open doubles final, top 10 year-end doubles ranking ===
Hradecká started 2015 ranked 141st in the world and had to qualify for the main draw of the Australian Open, which she did with three wins in the qualifying rounds. She then reached the third round, her best career showing in singles at any major.

Hradecká reached the 2016 Australian Open final with Andrea Hlaváčková, losing to Martina Hingis and Sania Mirza.

=== 2017–22: Third US Open doubles final, retirement ===
Hradecká reached another final at the 2017 US Open with Kateřina Siniaková, losing to Hingis and Chan Yung-jan.

She announced her final retirement in doubles in October 2022. Her last match was at the Guadalajara Open.

== Career statistics ==
=== Grand Slam singles performance timelines ===
Key
| W | F | SF | QF | #R | RR | Q# | DNQ | A | NH |

(W) winner; (F) finalist; (SF) semifinalist; (QF) quarterfinalist; (#R) rounds 4, 3, 2, 1; (RR) round-robin stage; (Q#) qualification round; (DNQ) did not qualify; (A) absent; (NH) not held; (SR) strike rate (events won / competed); (W–L) win–loss record.
To avoid confusion and double counting, these charts are updated at the conclusion of a tournament or when the player's participation has ended.

==== Singles ====
| Tournament | 2005 | 2006 | 2007 | 2008 | 2009 | 2010 | 2011 | 2012 | 2013 | 2014 | 2015 | 2016 | 2017 | 2018 | 2019 | SR | W–L | Win% |
|---|---|---|---|---|---|---|---|---|---|---|---|---|---|---|---|---|---|---|
| Australian Open | A | Q1 | Q1 | Q1 | Q1 | 1R | 1R | 2R | 2R | 2R | 3R | 1R | Q2 | A | Q2 | 0 / 7 | 5–7 | 42% |
| French Open | A | Q3 | A | Q1 | 2R | 1R | 2R | 1R | 1R | Q1 | 2R | 1R | Q3 | A | A | 0 / 7 | 3–7 | 30% |
| Wimbledon | Q1 | Q1 | A | Q1 | 1R | 1R | 1R | 1R | 1R | Q2 | 1R | Q1 | A | A | A | 0 / 6 | 0–6 | 0% |
| US Open | Q2 | A | Q2 | Q3 | 1R | 1R | 1R | 2R | 1R | Q1 | 1R | Q2 | Q2 | Q1 | A | 0 / 6 | 1–6 | 14% |
| Win–Loss | 0–0 | 0–0 | 0–0 | 0–0 | 1–3 | 0–4 | 1–4 | 2–4 | 1–4 | 1–1 | 3–4 | 0–2 | 0–0 | 0–0 | 0–0 | 0 / 26 | 9–26 | 26% |

==== Doubles ====
| Tournament | 2006 | 2007 | 2008 | 2009 | 2010 | 2011 | 2012 | 2013 | 2014 | 2015 | 2016 | 2017 | 2018 | 2019 | 2020 | 2021 | 2022 | SR | W–L | Win% |
|---|---|---|---|---|---|---|---|---|---|---|---|---|---|---|---|---|---|---|---|---|
| Australian Open | A | 1R | 1R | 2R | 3R | 2R | SF | 2R | 3R | 3R | F | 1R | A | 2R | 1R | 2R | 2R | 0 / 15 | 21–15 | 58% |
| French Open | 1R | 1R | 2R | 1R | 3R | W | SF | SF | SF | SF | QF | SF | 1R | 3R | 1R | 3R | 3R | 1 / 17 | 38–16 | 70% |
| Wimbledon | 3R | 1R | 1R | 1R | 2R | 1R | F | QF | 2R | 2R | 3R | 3R | 3R | 1R | NH | QF | 1R | 0 / 16 | 21–16 | 57% |
| US Open | 1R | 1R | 2R | 2R | 1R | QF | F | W | 3R | 3R | 3R | F | QF | 1R | 2R | QF | 2R | 1 / 17 | 35–16 | 69% |
| Win–Loss | 1–3 | 0–4 | 2–4 | 2–4 | 5–4 | 10–3 | 18–4 | 14–3 | 9–4 | 9–4 | 12–4 | 11–4 | 5–3 | 3–4 | 1–3 | 9–4 | 4–4 | 2 / 65 | 115–63 | 65% |

=== Grand Slam tournament finals ===
==== Doubles: 6 (2 titles, 4 runner-ups) ====
| Result | Year | Tournament | Surface | Partner | Opponents | Score |
|---|---|---|---|---|---|---|
| Win | 2011 | French Open | Clay | (Czech Republic) Andrea Hlaváčková | (India) Sania Mirza (Russia) Elena Vesnina | 6–4, 6–3 |
| Loss | 2012 | Wimbledon | Grass | (Czech Republic) Andrea Hlaváčková | (United States) Serena Williams (United States) Venus Williams | 5–7, 4–6 |
| Loss | 2012 | US Open | Hard | (Czech Republic) Andrea Hlaváčková | (Italy) Sara Errani (Italy) Roberta Vinci | 4–6, 2–6 |
| Win | 2013 | US Open | Hard | (Czech Republic) Andrea Hlaváčková | (Australia) Ashleigh Barty (Australia) Casey Dellacqua | 6–7^{(4–7)}, 6–1, 6–4 |
| Loss | 2016 | Australian Open | Hard | (Czech Republic) Andrea Hlaváčková | (Switzerland) Martina Hingis (India) Sania Mirza | 6–7^{(1–7)}, 3–6 |
| Loss | 2017 | US Open | Hard | (Czech Republic) Kateřina Siniaková | (Chinese Taipei) Chan Yung-jan (Switzerland) Martina Hingis | 3–6, 2–6 |

==== Mixed doubles: 3 (1 title, 2 runner-ups) ====
| Result | Year | Tournament | Surface | Partner | Opponents | Score |
|---|---|---|---|---|---|---|
| Loss | 2013 | Australian Open | Hard | (Czech Republic) František Čermák | (Australia) Jarmila Gajdošová (Australia) Matthew Ebden | 3–6, 5–7 |
| Win | 2013 | French Open | Clay | (Czech Republic) František Čermák | (France) Kristina Mladenovic (Canada) Daniel Nestor | 1–6, 6–4, [10–6] |
| Loss | 2015 | French Open | Clay | (Poland) Marcin Matkowski | (United States) Bethanie Mattek-Sands (United States) Mike Bryan | 6–7^{(3–7)}, 1–6 |

=== Year-end championship finals ===
==== Doubles: 1 (runner-up) ====
| Result | Year | Tournament | Surface | Partner | Opponents | Score |
|---|---|---|---|---|---|---|
| Loss | 2012 | WTA Finals, Istanbul | Hard (i) | (Czech Republic) Andrea Hlaváčková | (Russia) Maria Kirilenko (Russia) Nadia Petrova | 1–6, 4–6 |

=== Olympic Games medal matches ===
==== Doubles: 2 (1 silver medal) ====
| Result | Year | Tournament | Surface | Partner | Opponents | Score |
|---|---|---|---|---|---|---|
| Silver | 2012 | London Summer Olympics | Grass | (Czech Republic) Andrea Hlaváčková | (United States) Serena Williams (United States) Venus Williams | 4–6, 4–6 |
| 4th place | 2016 | Rio Summer Olympics | Hard | (Czech Republic) Andrea Hlaváčková | (Czech Republic) Lucie Šafářová (Czech Republic) Barbora Strýcová | 5–7, 1–6 |

==== Mixed doubles: 1 (bronze medal) ====
| Result | Year | Tournament | Surface | Partner | Opponents | Score |
|---|---|---|---|---|---|---|
| Bronze | 2016 | Rio Summer Olympics | Hard | (Czech Republic) Radek Štěpánek | (India) Sania Mirza (India) Rohan Bopanna | 6–1, 7–5 |
