= 2001 Cerveza Club Colombia Open – Singles =

Singles
- 2001 Cerveza Club Colombia Open

Final
- Champion: (Spain) Fernando Vicente
- Runner-up: (Argentina) Juan Ignacio Chela
- Score: 6–4, 7–6^{(8–6)}

Details
- Draw: 32
- Seeds: 8

Events
Singles	Doubles
← 2000 ·	Cerveza Club Colombia Open	· 2002 →

Mariano Puerta was the defending champion but did not compete that year.

Fernando Vicente won in the final 6–4, 7–6^{(8–6)} against Juan Ignacio Chela.

== Seeds ==
A champion seed is indicated in bold text while text in italics indicates the round in which that seed was eliminated.

1. (Spain) Albert Costa (first round)
2. (Spain) **Fernando Vicente (champion)**
3. (Argentina) Juan Ignacio Chela (final)
4. (Chile) Nicolás Massú (first round)
5. (Argentina) Guillermo Coria (quarterfinals)
6. (Germany) Markus Hantschk (second round)
7. (Russia) Andrei Stoliarov (quarterfinals)
8. (Brazil) Fernando Meligeni (first round)

== Draw ==
=== Key ===
- Q = Qualifier
- WC = Wild card
- LL = Lucky loser
- Alt = Alternate
- SE = Special exempt
- PR = Protected ranking
- ITF = ITF entry
- JE = Junior exempt
- w/o = Walkover
- r = Retired
- d = Defaulted
- SR = Special ranking

First round
1	(Spain) A Costa	**6**	6^{4}	5
(Spain) **J A Viloca**	2	**7^{7}**	**7**
(Russia) N Davydenko	3	4
(Costa Rica) **J A Marín**	**6**	**6**
WC	(Colombia) **M Hadad**	**6**	3	**6**
(Brazil) A Sá	3	**6**	4
(Haiti) R Agénor	6^{4}	3
6	(Germany) **M Hantschk**	**7^{7}**	**6**
WC/3	(Argentina) **J I Chela**	**6**	**6**
(Bulgaria) O Stanoytchev	1	1
(Argentina) **G Etlis**	**6**	**6**
(Argentina) M Charpentier	3	1
WC	(Colombia) **M Tobón**	**7^{11}**	**6**
(Spain) E Benfele Álvarez	6^{9}	3
Q	(Argentina) **D Nalbandian**	**6**	**6**
8	(Brazil) F Meligeni	2	0
5	(Argentina) **G Coria**	**6**	**7**
(United States) M Russell	4	5
(Chile) **F González**	**6**	**6**
(Spain) Ó Serrano	4	4
Q	(Brazil) **A Simoni**	6^{8}	**6**	**6**
(Argentina) D Moyano	**7^{10}**	1	4
Q	(Paraguay) **R Delgado**	**6**	3	**7**
4	(Chile) N Massú	1	**6**	5
7	(Russia) **A Stoliarov**	**6**	**7^{8}**
(Thailand) P Srichaphan	2	6^{6}
(United States) **H Armando**	**6**	**6**
(Czech Republic) T Zíb	4	4
(Peru) L Horna	**6**	6^{1}	4
Q	(Argentina) **I Hirigoyen**	4	**7^{7}**	**6**
(Argentina) M Rodríguez	5	2
2	(Spain) **F Vicente**	**7**	**6**

Second round
(Spain) **J A Viloca**	**6**	**6**
(Costa Rica) J A Marín	3	4
WC	(Colombia) **M Hadad**	**6**	**6**
6	(Germany) M Hantschk	2	2
WC/3	(Argentina) **J I Chela**	4	**7^{7}**	**6**
(Argentina) G Etlis	**6**	6^{3}	1
WC	(Colombia) M Tobón	6^{7}	4
Q	(Argentina) **D Nalbandian**	**7^{9}**	**6**
5	(Argentina) **G Coria**	**6**	**6**
(Chile) F González	0	3
Q	(Brazil) **A Simoni**	**6**	**7^{7}**
Q	(Paraguay) R Delgado	4	6^{3}
7	(Russia) **A Stoliarov**	**7^{8}**	4	**6**
(United States) H Armando	6^{6}	**6**	3
Q	(Argentina) I Hirigoyen	4	6^{4}
2	(Spain) **F Vicente**	**6**	**7^{7}**

Quarterfinals
(Spain) **J A Viloca**	**6**	3	**6**
WC	(Colombia) M Hadad	3	**6**	4
WC/3	(Argentina) **J I Chela**	**7**	**6**
Q	(Argentina) D Nalbandian	5	3
5	(Argentina) G Coria	4	4
Q	(Brazil) **A Simoni**	**6**	**6**
7	(Russia) A Stoliarov	**7^{7}**	3	1
2	(Spain) **F Vicente**	6^{4}	**6**	**6**

Semifinals
(Spain) J A Viloca	6^{10}	3
WC/3	(Argentina) **J I Chela**	**7^{12}**	**6**
Q	(Brazil) A Simoni	3	6^{7}
2	(Spain) **F Vicente**	**6**	**7^{9}**

Final
WC/3	(Argentina) J I Chela	4	6^{6}
2	(Spain) **F Vicente**	**6**	**7^{8}**
