= 1998 Cerveza Club Colombia Open – Singles =

Singles
- 1998 Cerveza Club Colombia Open

Final
- Champion: (Argentina) Mariano Zabaleta
- Runner-up: (Paraguay) Ramón Delgado
- Score: 6–4, 6–4

Details
- Draw: 32
- Seeds: 8

Events
Singles	Doubles
- Cerveza Club Colombia Open

The 1998 Cerveza Club Colombia Open was a men's tennis tournament played on Clay in Bogotá, Colombia that was part of the International Series of the 1998 ATP Tour. It was the fifth edition of the tournament and was held from 2 November – 8 November.

== Seeds ==
Champion seeds are indicated in bold text while text in italics indicates the round in which those seeds were eliminated.

1. (Spain) Félix Mantilla (second round)
2. (Spain) Alberto Berasategui (first round)
3. Unknown (withdrew)
4. (Austria) Thomas Muster (first round)
5. (Spain) Francisco Clavet (second round)
6. (Argentina) Mariano Puerta (second round)
7. (Slovakia) Dominik Hrbatý (first round)
8. (Argentina) Franco Squillari (first round)

== Draw ==
Key

- Q = Qualifier
- WC = Wild card
- LL = Lucky loser
- Alt = Alternate
- ITF = ITF entry
- PR = Protected ranking
- SR = Special ranking
- SE = Special exempt
- JE = Junior exempt
- JR = Junior Accelerator Programme entrant
- CO = College Accelerator Programme entrant
- NG = Next Gen Accelerator Program entrant
- w/o = Walkover
- r = Retired
- d = Defaulted

=== Finals ===
Semifinals
**(Paraguay) Ramón Delgado**	**6**	4	3
(Armenia) Sargis Sargsian	3	**6**	1^{r}
**(Argentina) Mariano Zabaleta**	**6**	**6**
(Czech Republic) Jiří Novák	2	4

Final
(Paraguay) Ramón Delgado	4	4
**(Argentina) Mariano Zabaleta**	**6**	**6**

=== Top half ===
First round
1	**(Spain) F Mantilla**	**6**	**6**
(Argentina) G Cañas	4	2
**(United States) J Courier**	**6**	**6**
(Argentina) M Rodríguez	1	3
**(Brazil) F Meligeni**	**6**	**6**
(Chile) N Massú	2	3
**(Paraguay) R Delgado**	**6**	**6**
7	(Slovakia) D Hrbatý	4	3
**(Spain) J Alonso**	**6**	3	**6**
(Brazil) A Sá	4	**6**	1
**(Armenia) S Sargsian**	**6**	**6**
(Argentina) L Arnold	2	4
**(Spain) J Balcells**	**6**	**7**
(Ecuador) N Lapentti	3	6^{2}
5	**(Spain) F Clavet**	**6**	**6**
(Morocco) K Alami	4	2

Second round
1	(Spain) F Mantilla	6^{4}	5
**(United States) J Courier**	**7**	**7**
(Brazil) F Meligeni	3	4
**(Paraguay) R Delgado**	**6**	**6**
(Spain) J Alonso	1	**7**	4
**(Armenia) S Sargsian**	**6**	6^{5}	**6**
**(Spain) J Balcells**	4	**6**	**7**
5	(Spain) F Clavet	**6**	3	6^{5}

Quarterfinals
(United States) J Courier	**7**	1	**7**
**(Paraguay) R Delgado**	6^{6}	**6**	5
**(Armenia) S Sargsian**	**7**	**7**
(Spain) J Balcells	6^{4}	5

Semifinals
**(Paraguay) R Delgado**	**6**	4	3
(Armenia) S Sargsian	3	**6**	1^{r}

=== Bottom half ===
First round
6	**(Argentina) M Puerta**	**6**	**6**
(United States) S Campbell	1	3
**(Argentina) M Zabaleta**	**6**	**6**
(Spain) F Vicente	4	4
**(Colombia) M Hadad**	**6**	**6**
(Brazil) R Schlachter	2	0
**(Belgium) X Malisse**	**7**	**6**
4	(Austria) T Muster	5	1
**(Italy) D Sanguinetti**	**7**	**6**
8	(Argentina) F Squillari	6^{6}	3
**(Costa Rica) JA Marín**	**6**	**6**
(Netherlands) D van Scheppingen	3	3
**(Ecuador) L Morejon**	**7**	**7**
(Spain) Á Calatrava	5	6^{5}
**(Czech Republic) J Novák**	**6**	**6**
2	(Spain) A Berasategui	2	2

Second round
6	(Argentina) M Puerta	**6**	3	4
**(Argentina) M Zabaleta**	3	**6**	**6**
**(Colombia) M Hadad**	**6**	2
(Belgium) X Malisse	2	0^{r}
**(Italy) D Sanguinetti**	**6**	**7**
(Costa Rica) JA Marín	4	5
(Ecuador) L Morejon	3	2
**(Czech Republic) J Novák**	**6**	**6**

Quarterfinals
**(Argentina) M Zabaleta**	6^{3}	**6**	**7**
(Colombia) M Hadad	**7**	4	6^{6}
(Italy) D Sanguinetti	5	**6**	4
**(Czech Republic) J Novák**	**7**	4	**6**

Semifinals
**(Argentina) M Zabaleta**	**6**	**6**
(Czech Republic) J Novák	2	4
