= 1998 Cerveza Club Colombia Open – Doubles =

Doubles
- 1998 Cerveza Club Colombia Open

Final
- Champions: (Argentina) Diego del Río; (Argentina) Mariano Puerta
- Runners-up: (Hungary) Gábor Köves; (Philippines) Eric Taino
- Score: 6–7, 6–3, 6–2

Details
- Draw: 16
- Seeds: 4

Events
Singles	Doubles
- Cerveza Club Colombia Open

The 1998 Cerveza Club Colombia Open was a men's tennis tournament played on Clay in Bogotá, Colombia that was part of the International Series of the 1998 ATP Tour. It was the fifth edition of the tournament and was held from 2 November – 8 November.

== Seeds ==
Champion seeds are indicated in bold text while text in italics indicates the round in which those seeds were eliminated.

1. (Czech Republic) Jiří Novák / (Czech Republic) David Rikl (semifinals, retired)
2. (Argentina) Daniel Orsanic / (Mexico) David Roditi (quarterfinals)
3. (Spain) Julián Alonso / (Ecuador) Nicolás Lapentti (first round)
4. (United States) Brandon Coupe / (South Africa) Paul Rosner (semifinals)

== Draw ==
Key

- Q = Qualifier
- WC = Wild card
- LL = Lucky loser
- Alt = Alternate
- ITF = ITF entry
- PR = Protected ranking
- SR = Special ranking
- SE = Special exempt
- JE = Junior exempt
- JR = Junior Accelerator Programme entrant
- CO = College Accelerator Programme entrant
- NG = Next Gen Accelerator Program entrant
- w/o = Walkover
- r = Retired
- d = Defaulted

=== Finals ===
First round

Quarterfinals

Semifinals

Final

1
- (Czech Republic) J Novák
- (Czech Republic) D Rikl
**6**
**6**

- (United States) L Jensen
- (United States) M Jensen
4
2

1
- (Czech Republic) J Novák
- (Czech Republic) D Rikl
**6**
**6**

- (Argentina) P Albano
- (United States) TJ Middleton
6
**6**
**6**

- (Argentina) P Albano
- (United States) TJ Middleton
3
4

- (Venezuela) M Ruah
- (Brazil) A Sá
**7**
3
4

1
- (Czech Republic) J Novák
- (Czech Republic) D Rikl
**6**
3
R

- (Hungary) G Köves
- (United States) E Taino
**7**
**7**

- (Hungary) G Köves
- (United States) E Taino
2
**6**

3
- (Spain) J Alonso
- (Ecuador) N Lapentti
5
5

- (Hungary) G Köves
- (United States) E Taino
**7**
**7**

- (South Africa) L Bale
- (United Kingdom) D Sapsford
**7**
**7**

- (South Africa) L Bale
- (United Kingdom) D Sapsford
6
6

- (Italy) M Bertolini
- (United States) D Bowen
5
6

- (Hungary) G Köves
- (United States) E Taino
**7**
3
2

- (United States) J Courier
- (Italy) D Sanguinetti
**6**
**6**

- (Argentina) D del Río
- (Argentina) M Puerta
6
**6**
**6**

- (Argentina) M Hood
- (Argentina) M Rodríguez
2
2

- (United States) J Courier
- (Italy) D Sanguinetti
4
4

4
- (United States) B Coupe
- (South Africa) P Rosner
4
**6**
**6**

4
- (United States) B Coupe
- (South Africa) P Rosner
**6**
**6**

- (Spain) A Berasategui
- (Spain) J Burillo
**6**
3
4

4
- (United States) B Coupe
- (South Africa) P Rosner
4
2

- (Argentina) D del Río
- (Argentina) M Puerta
**6**
**7**

- (Argentina) D del Río
- (Argentina) M Puerta
**6**
**6**

- (Spain) F Mantilla
- (Colombia) M Tobón
3
6

- (Argentina) D del Río
- (Argentina) M Puerta
**7**
4
**6**

2
- (Argentina) D Orsanic
- (Mexico) D Roditi
**6**
**6**

2
- (Argentina) D Orsanic
- (Mexico) D Roditi
6
**6**
4

- (Spain) J Balcells
- (Armenia) S Sargsian
4
4
