= 2009 Copa Petrobras Asunción – Singles =

Singles
- 2009 Copa Petrobras Asunción

Final
- Champion: (Paraguay) Ramón Delgado
- Runner-up: (Spain) Daniel Gimeno-Traver
- Score: 7–6(2), 1–6, 6–3

Events
Singles	Doubles
← 2008 ·	Copa Petrobras Asunción	· 2010 →

Martín Vassallo Argüello chose to not defend his 2008 title.
Ramón Delgado won the tournament in his own country, after defeating Daniel Gimeno-Traver 7–6(2), 1–6, 6–3 in the final.

== Seeds ==
1. (Argentina) Máximo González (second round)
2. (Chile) Nicolás Massú (first round)
3. (Chile) Paul Capdeville (first round)
4. (Spain) Santiago Ventura (quarterfinals)
5. (Spain) Daniel Gimeno-Traver (final)
6. (Spain) Rubén Ramírez Hidalgo (first round, retired due to right wrist injury)
7. (France) Laurent Recouderc (first round, retired due to right thigh injury)
8. (Slovenia) Blaž Kavčič (semifinals)

== Draw ==
=== Key ===
- Q = Qualifier
- WC = Wild card
- LL = Lucky loser
- Alt = Alternate
- SE = Special exempt
- PR = Protected ranking
- ITF = ITF entry
- JE = Junior exempt
- w/o = Walkover
- r = Retired
- d = Defaulted
- SR = Special ranking

=== Final four ===
Semifinals
8	(Slovenia) Blaž Kavčič	6^{5}	6	1
WC	(Paraguay) Ramón Delgado	7	4	6
(Argentina) Diego Junqueira	3	4
5	(Spain) Daniel Gimeno-Traver	6	6

Final
WC	(Paraguay) Ramón Delgado	7	1	6
5	(Spain) Daniel Gimeno-Traver	6^{2}	6	3

=== Top half ===
First round
1	(Argentina) M González	6	6
ALT	(France) J Dasnières de Veigy	4	1
ALT	(Argentina) J-M Aranguren	6^{5}	6	6
ALT	(Argentina) F del Bonis	7	4	4
(Brazil) J Silva	4	6	3
(Argentina) M Zabaleta	6	4	6
Q	(Brazil) M Demoliner	1	4
8	(Slovenia) B Kavčič	6	6
4	(Spain) S Ventura	2	6	6
(Brazil) F Ferreiro	6	4	2
(Brazil) R Hocevar	1	4
(Canada) P Polansky	6	6
(United States) A Bogomolov Jr.	2	6	6
(Brazil) J Souza	6	4	3
WC	(Paraguay) R Delgado	7	4
6	(Spain) R Ramírez Hidalgo	6^{5}	0	r

Second round
1	(Argentina) M González	4	3
ALT	(Argentina) J-M Aranguren	6	6
(Argentina) M Zabaleta	6	3	0
8	(Slovenia) B Kavčič	4	6	6
4	(Spain) S Ventura	6^{5}	7	6
(Canada) P Polansky	7	6^{8}	2
(United States) A Bogomolov Jr.	4	4
WC	(Paraguay) R Delgado	6	6

Quarterfinals
ALT	(Argentina) J-M Aranguren	6	2	0
8	(Slovenia) B Kavčič	3	6	6
4	(Spain) S Ventura	3	2
WC	(Paraguay) R Delgado	6	6

Semifinals
8	(Slovenia) B Kavčič	6^{5}	6	1
WC	(Paraguay) R Delgado	7	4	6

=== Bottom half ===
First round
7	(France) L Recouderc	3	0	r
(Argentina) D Junqueira	6	4
WC	(Paraguay) D Galeano	2	1
Q	(Spain) C Poch-Gradin	6	6
Q	(Argentina) Guido Pella	4	6	4
Q	(Argentina) Facundo Bagnis	6	3	6
(Spain) D Muñoz-De La Nava	6	6
3	(Chile) P Capdeville	3	4
5	(Spain) D Gimeno-Traver	6	3	6
(Argentina) E Schwank	4	6	3
(Spain) D Marrero	3	6	2
(Argentina) S Decoud	6	3	6
WC	(Paraguay) N Salama	2	2
WC	(Argentina) M Puerta	6	6
SE	(Argentina) G Gaudio	6	7
2	(Chile) N Massú	1	5

Second round
(Argentina) D Junqueira	5	7	7
Q	(Spain) C Poch-Gradin	7	6^{6}	6^{4}
Q	(Argentina) F Bagnis	6	7
(Spain) D Muñoz-De La Nava	1	6^{2}
5	(Spain) D Gimeno-Traver	7	6
(Argentina) S Decoud	6^{5}	2
WC	(Argentina) M Puerta	4	4
SE	(Argentina) G Gaudio	6	6

Quarterfinals
(Argentina) D Junqueira	6	3	6
Q	(Argentina) F Bagnis	3	6	1
5	(Spain) D Gimeno-Traver	6	6
SE	(Argentina) G Gaudio	3	1

Semifinals
(Argentina) D Junqueira	3	4
5	(Spain) D Gimeno-Traver	6	6
