= 2010 Copa Petrobras Asunción – Doubles =

Doubles
- 2010 Copa Petrobras Asunción

Final
- Champions: (Italy) Fabio Fognini (Italy) Paolo Lorenzi
- Runners-up: (Argentina) Carlos Berlocq (Argentina) Brian Dabul
- Score: 6–3, 6–4

Events
Singles	Doubles
← 2009 ·	Copa Petrobras Asunción	· 2011 →

The defending champions: Rubén Ramírez Hidalgo and Santiago Ventura were eliminated by Rogério Dutra da Silva and Rui Machado already in the first round.
Italian pair Fabio Fognini and Paolo Lorenzi defeated 4th seeds Carlos Berlocq and Brian Dabul 6–3, 6–4 in the final match.

== Seeds ==
1. (Brazil) Franco Ferreiro / (Brazil) André Sá (semifinals)
2. (Spain) Rubén Ramírez Hidalgo / (Spain) Santiago Ventura (first round)
3. (Australia) Kaden Hensel / (Australia) Adam Hubble (first round)
4. (Argentina) Carlos Berlocq / (Argentina) Brian Dabul (final)

== Draw ==
=== Key ===
- Q = Qualifier
- WC = Wild card
- LL = Lucky loser
- Alt = Alternate
- SE = Special exempt
- PR = Protected ranking
- ITF = ITF entry
- JE = Junior exempt
- w/o = Walkover
- r = Retired
- d = Defaulted
- SR = Special ranking

=== Draw ===
First round
1	(Brazil) F Ferreiro (Brazil) A Sá	6	6
(Spain) A Ramos-Viñolas (Spain) P Riba	3	3
WC	(Ecuador) D Hidalgo (Argentina) A Velotti	1	3
(Colombia) JS Cabal (Colombia) R Farah	6	6
3	(Australia) K Hensel (Australia) A Hubble	5	5
(Italy) F Fognini (Italy) P Lorenzi	7	7
(Spain) G Alcaide (Slovakia) P Červenák	6	6
WC	(Paraguay) J Benítez (Paraguay) G Ramírez	3	1
WC	(Paraguay) D Galeano (Paraguay) D-A López	6	6
(Argentina) M Alund (Argentina) F Bagnis	2	2
(France) É Prodon (Portugal) L Tavares	3	2
4	(Argentina) C Berlocq (Argentina) B Dabul	6	6
(Argentina) D Cristín (Argentina) D Junqueira	1	6^{4}
(Chile) J Aguilar (Argentina) F del Bonis	6	7
(Brazil) R Dutra da Silva (Portugal) R Machado	6	6
2	(Spain) R Ramírez Hidalgo (Spain) S Ventura	4	2

Quarterfinals
1	(Brazil) F Ferreiro (Brazil) A Sá	7	3	[10]
(Colombia) JS Cabal (Colombia) R Farah	6^{4}	6	[7]
(Italy) F Fognini (Italy) P Lorenzi	6	7
(Spain) G Alcaide (Slovakia) P Červenák	2	6^{2}
WC	(Paraguay) D Galeano (Paraguay) D-A López	0	3
4	(Argentina) C Berlocq (Argentina) B Dabul	6	6
(Chile) J Aguilar (Argentina) F del Bonis	3	7	[10]
(Brazil) R Dutra da Silva (Portugal) R Machado	6	6^{3}	[6]

Semifinals
1	(Brazil) F Ferreiro (Brazil) A Sá	4	6	[6]
(Italy) F Fognini (Italy) P Lorenzi	6	0	[10]
4	(Argentina) C Berlocq (Argentina) B Dabul	6	6
(Chile) J Aguilar (Argentina) F del Bonis	1	0

Finals
(Italy) F Fognini (Italy) P Lorenzi	6	6
4	(Argentina) C Berlocq (Argentina) B Dabul	3	4
