= 2009 Copa Petrobras Asunción – Doubles =

Doubles
- 2009 Copa Petrobras Asunción

Final
- Champions: (Spain) Rubén Ramírez Hidalgo (Spain) Santiago Ventura
- Runners-up: (Argentina) Máximo González (Argentina) Eduardo Schwank
- Score: 6–3, 0–6, [10–8]

Events
Singles	Doubles
← 2008 ·	Copa Petrobras Asunción	· 2010 →

Alejandro Fabbri and Leonardo Mayer were the defending champions, but they chose to not participate this year.
Rubén Ramírez Hidalgo and Santiago Ventura won in the final 6–3, 0–6, [10–8], against Máximo González and Eduardo Schwank.

== Seeds ==
1. (Spain) Rubén Ramírez Hidalgo / (Spain) Santiago Ventura (champions)
2. (Argentina) Máximo González / (Argentina) Eduardo Schwank (final)
3. (Spain) David Marrero / (Spain) Carles Poch-Gradin (semifinals)
4. (Brazil) Ricardo Hocevar / (Brazil) João Souza (semifinals)

== Draw ==
=== Key ===
- Q = Qualifier
- WC = Wild card
- LL = Lucky loser
- Alt = Alternate
- SE = Special exempt
- PR = Protected ranking
- ITF = ITF entry
- JE = Junior exempt
- w/o = Walkover
- r = Retired
- d = Defaulted
- SR = Special ranking

=== Draw ===
First round
1	(Spain) R Ramírez Hidalgo (Spain) S Ventura	6	6
WC	(Paraguay) D Galeano (Paraguay) N Salama	1	3
(Brazil) F Ferreiro (Spain) D Muñoz-De La Nava	6	6
(Brazil) Tiago Lopes (Brazil) J Silva	1	2
3	(Spain) D Marrero (Spain) C Poch-Gradin	7	6
WC	(Argentina) A Collarini (Argentina) F del Bonis	6^{1}	2
(Argentina) J-M Aranguren (Argentina) D Junqueira	5	4
(Slovenia) B Kavčič (Croatia) F Škugor	7	6
(Paraguay) R Delgado (Argentina) S Prieto	4	6	[3]
(United States) A Bogomolov Jr. (Canada) P Polansky	6	4	[10]
WC	(Paraguay) J Benítez (Italy) D-A Lopez	5	5
4	(Brazil) R Hocevar (Brazil) J Souza	7	7
(Argentina) A Molteni (Argentina) Guido Pella	3	6	[6]
(Brazil) M Demoliner (Portugal) L Tavares	6	4	[10]
(France) J Dasnières de Veigy (France) L Recouderc	w/o
2	(Argentina) M González (Argentina) E Schwank

Quarterfinals
1	(Spain) R Ramírez Hidalgo (Spain) S Ventura	6	6
(Brazil) F Ferreiro (Spain) D Muñoz-De La Nava	4	4
3	(Spain) D Marrero (Spain) C Poch-Gradin	6	6
(Slovenia) B Kavčič (Croatia) F Škugor	1	2
(United States) A Bogomolov Jr. (Canada) P Polansky	6^{5}	6	[7]
4	(Brazil) R Hocevar (Brazil) J Souza	7	4	[10]
(Brazil) M Demoliner (Portugal) L Tavares	4	3
2	(Argentina) M González (Argentina) E Schwank	6	6

Semifinals
1	(Spain) R Ramírez Hidalgo (Spain) S Ventura	6	0	[10]
3	(Spain) D Marrero (Spain) C Poch-Gradin	3	6	[8]
4	(Brazil) R Hocevar (Brazil) J Souza	2	4
2	(Argentina) M González (Argentina) E Schwank	6	6

Finals
1	(Spain) R Ramírez Hidalgo (Spain) S Ventura	6	0	[10]
2	(Argentina) M González (Argentina) E Schwank	3	6	[8]
