= 2001 Cerveza Club Colombia Open – Doubles =

Doubles
- 2001 Cerveza Club Colombia Open
- 2000 Champions: (Argentina) Pablo Albano; (Argentina) Lucas Arnold

Final
- Champions: (Argentina) Mariano Hood; (Argentina) Sebastián Prieto
- Runners-up: (Argentina) Martín Rodríguez; (Brazil) André Sá
- Score: 6–2, 6–4

Events
Singles	Doubles
← 2000 ·	Cerveza Club Colombia Open	· 2002 →

Pablo Albano and Lucas Arnold were the defending champions but they competed with different partners that year, Albano with Alexandre Simoni and Arnold with Gastón Etlis.

Albano and Simoni lost in the quarterfinals to Mariano Hood and Sebastián Prieto.

Arnold and Etlis lost in the semifinals to Martín Rodríguez and André Sá.

Hood and Prieto won in the final 6–2, 6–4 against Rodríguez and Sá.

== Seeds ==
Champion seeds are indicated in bold text while text in italics indicates the round in which those seeds were eliminated.

1. (Argentina) Lucas Arnold / (Argentina) Gastón Etlis (semifinals)
2. (Argentina) Pablo Albano / (Brazil) Alexandre Simoni (quarterfinals)
3. (Brazil) Antonio Prieto / (Israel) Eyal Ran (first round)
4. (United States) Devin Bowen / (Federal Republic of Yugoslavia) Dušan Vemić (semifinals)

== Draw ==
=== Key ===
- Q = Qualifier
- WC = Wild card
- LL = Lucky loser
- Alt = Alternate
- SE = Special exempt
- PR = Protected ranking
- ITF = ITF entry
- JE = Junior exempt
- w/o = Walkover
- r = Retired
- d = Defaulted
- SR = Special ranking

First round

Quarterfinals

Semifinals

Final

1
- (Argentina) L Arnold
- (Argentina) G Etlis
**6**
4
**6**

WC
- (Colombia) A Falla
- (Colombia) M Quintero
2
**6**
0

1
- (Argentina) L Arnold
- (Argentina) G Etlis
**7^{7}**
**6**

- (United States) B Coupe
- (United States) M Sprengelmeyer
**7^{7}**
**7^{7}**

- (United States) B Coupe
- (United States) M Sprengelmeyer
6^{4}
3

- (Argentina) S Roitman
- (Italy) A Schneiter
6^{5}
6^{5}

1
- (Argentina) L Arnold
- (Argentina) G Etlis
5
**6**
6^{6}

3
- (Brazil) A Prieto
- (Israel) E Ran
4
6^{5}

- (Argentina) M Rodríguez
- (Brazil) A Sá
**7**
4
**7^{8}**

- (Australia) T Crichton
- (Australia) A Fisher
**6**
**7^{7}**

- (Australia) T Crichton
- (Australia) A Fisher
**6**
3
6^{7}

- (Spain) E Benfele Álvarez
- (Spain) J Velasco Jr.
2
2

- (Argentina) M Rodríguez
- (Brazil) A Sá
4
**6**
**7^{9}**

- (Argentina) M Rodríguez
- (Brazil) A Sá
**6**
**6**

- (Argentina) Martín Rodríguez
- (Brazil) André Sá
2
4

WC
- (Colombia) M Tobón
- (Spain) J A Viloca
**6**
**7**

- (Argentina) Mariano Hood
- (Argentina) Sebastián Prieto
**6**
**6**

Q
- (Spain) J Alonso
- (United States) H Armando
3
5

WC
- (Colombia) M Tobón
- (Spain) J A Viloca
6^{6}
3

WC
- (Spain) A Costa
- (Spain) F Vicente
**6**
6^{3}
2

4
- (United States) D Bowen
- (Federal Republic of Yugoslavia) D Vemić
**7^{8}**
**6**

4
- (United States) D Bowen
- (Federal Republic of Yugoslavia) D Vemić
2
**7^{7}**
**6**

4
- (United States) D Bowen
- (Federal Republic of Yugoslavia) D Vemić
6^{8}
6^{6}

- (South Africa) B Haygarth
- (The Bahamas) M Merklein
**7^{7}**
3
6^{3}

- (Argentina) M Hood
- (Argentina) S Prieto
**7^{10}**
**7^{8}**

- (Argentina) M Hood
- (Argentina) S Prieto
6^{5}
**6**
**7^{7}**

- (Argentina) M Hood
- (Argentina) S Prieto
**7**
5
**6**

- (United States) D DiLucia
- (Brazil) D Melo
2
**6**
4

2
- (Argentina) P Albano
- (Brazil) A Simoni
5
**7**
4

2
- (Argentina) P Albano
- (Brazil) A Simoni
**6**
2
**6**
