= 2009 Bancolombia Open – Doubles =

Doubles
- 2009 Bancolombia Open

Final
- Champions: (Argentina) Sebastián Prieto (Argentina) Horacio Zeballos
- Runners-up: (Austria) Alexander Peya (Spain) Fernando Vicente
- Score: 7–6(5), 6–4

Events
Singles	Doubles
- Bancolombia Open

Brian Dabul and Ramón Delgado were the defending champions. Delgado chose to not participate this year. Delgado partnered up by Sebastián Decoud, however they lost to Santiago González and Jean-Julien Rojer.
Sebastián Prieto and Horacio Zeballos won in the final 7–6(5), 6–4, against Alexander Peya and Fernando Vicente.

== Seeds ==
1. (Argentina) Máximo González / (Argentina) Sergio Roitman (first round)
2. (Mexico) Santiago González / (Netherlands Antilles) Jean-Julien Rojer (second round)
3. (Argentina) Sebastián Prieto / (Argentina) Horacio Zeballos (champion)
4. (Spain) Óscar Hernández / (Spain) Iván Navarro (first round)

== Draw ==
Key

- Q = Qualifier
- WC = Wild card
- LL = Lucky loser
- Alt = Alternate
- ITF = ITF entry
- PR = Protected ranking
- SR = Special ranking
- SE = Special exempt
- JE = Junior exempt
- JR = Junior Accelerator Programme entrant
- CO = College Accelerator Programme entrant
- NG = Next Gen Accelerator Program entrant
- w/o = Walkover
- r = Retired
- d = Defaulted

=== Draw ===
First round
1	(Argentina) M González (Argentina) S Roitman	2	4
(Argentina) M Puerta (Argentina) M Zabaleta	6	6
(Argentina) J P Guzmán (Argentina) L Mayer	4	6	[3]
(Colombia) JS Cabal (Colombia) A Falla	6	3	[10]
4	(Spain) Ó Hernández (Spain) I Navarro	4	3
(Austria) A Peya (Spain) F Vicente	6	6
(Brazil) T Alves (Brazil) J Silva	6	6
WC	(Ecuador) G Lapentti (Argentina) G Marcaccio	4	3
(Brazil) R Hocevar (Brazil) J Souza	3	3
WC	(Argentina) Juan Pablo Amado (Colombia) E Struvay	6	6
(Brazil) F Ferreiro (Brazil) R Mello	6	3	[5]
3	(Argentina) S Prieto (Argentina) H Zeballos	2	6	[10]
(Dominican Republic) V Estrella (Brazil) A Miele	4	5
WC	(Mexico) B Echagaray (Uruguay) M Felder	6	7
(Argentina) B Dabul (Argentina) S Decoud	4	2
2	(Mexico) S González (Netherlands Antilles) J-J Rojer	6	6

Quarterfinals
(Argentina) M Puerta (Argentina) M Zabaleta	w/o
(Colombia) JS Cabal (Colombia) A Falla
(Austria) A Peya (Spain) F Vicente	6	6
(Brazil) T Alves (Brazil) J Silva	4	2
WC	(Argentina) JP Amado (Colombia) E Struvay	2	5
3	(Argentina) S Prieto (Argentina) H Zeballos	6	7
WC	(Mexico) B Echagaray (Uruguay) M Felder	4	7	[10]
2	(Mexico) S González (Netherlands Antilles) J-J Rojer	6	6^{4}	[6]

Semifinals
(Colombia) JS Cabal (Colombia) A Falla	6	3	[6]
(Austria) A Peya (Spain) F Vicente	4	6	[10]
3	(Argentina) S Prieto (Argentina) H Zeballos	6	6
WC	(Mexico) B Echagaray (Uruguay) M Felder	4	4

Finals
(Austria) A Peya (Spain) F Vicente	6	1	[9]
3	(Argentina) S Prieto (Argentina) H Zeballos	4	6	[11]
