= 2010 Copa Petrobras Asunción – Singles =

Singles
- 2010 Copa Petrobras Asunción

Final
- Champion: (Portugal) Rui Machado
- Runner-up: (Paraguay) Ramón Delgado
- Score: 6–2, 3–6, 7–5

Events
Singles	Doubles
← 2009 ·	Copa Petrobras Asunción	· 2011 →

Ramón Delgado was the defending champion. This year he reached the final, losing, however, to 7th seed Rui Machado 2–6, 6–3, 5–7.

== Seeds ==
1. (Italy) Fabio Fognini (second round)
2. (Spain) Pere Riba (quarterfinals)
3. (Spain) Rubén Ramírez Hidalgo (quarterfinals)
4. (Argentina) Brian Dabul (second round)
5. (Argentina) Carlos Berlocq (semifinals)
6. (Spain) Albert Ramos-Viñolas (second round)
7. (Portugal) Rui Machado (champion)
8. (Chile) Nicolás Massú (second round)

== Draw ==
=== Key ===
- Q = Qualifier
- WC = Wild card
- LL = Lucky loser
- Alt = Alternate
- SE = Special exempt
- PR = Protected ranking
- ITF = ITF entry
- JE = Junior exempt
- w/o = Walkover
- r = Retired
- d = Defaulted
- SR = Special ranking

=== Finals ===
Semifinals
7	(Portugal) Rui Machado	6	6
5	(Argentina) Carlos Berlocq	4	4
(Serbia) Nikola Ćirić	3	2
(Paraguay) Ramón Delgado	6	6

Final
7	(Portugal) Rui Machado	6	3	7
(Paraguay) Ramón Delgado	2	6	5

=== Top half ===
First round
1/WC	(Italy) F Fognini	4	6	6
(Chile) J Aguilar	6	2	3
(Slovakia) P Červenák	6	6
Q	(Argentina) J-J Monteferrario	0	2
(Italy) P Lorenzi	6	6
(Colombia) R Farah	4	1
(Spain) G Alcaide	3	6	5
7	(Portugal) R Machado	6	3	7
3	(Spain) R Ramírez Hidalgo	6	6
WC	(Paraguay) D Galeano	0	4
WC	(Paraguay) D-A López	2	1
Q	(Argentina) M Trungelliti	6	6
(Colombia) JS Cabal	6	6
(Argentina) F del Bonis	3	4
WC	(Argentina) J Acasuso	4	1
5	(Argentina) C Berlocq	6	6

Second round
1/WC	(Italy) F Fognini	4	2
(Slovakia) P Červenák	6	6
(Italy) P Lorenzi	4	2
7	(Portugal) R Machado	6	6
3	(Spain) R Ramírez Hidalgo	6	3	7
Q	(Argentina) M Trungelliti	3	6	6^{7}
(Colombia) JS Cabal	1	0
5	(Argentina) C Berlocq	6	6

Quarterfinals
(Slovakia) P Červenák	1	4
7	(Portugal) R Machado	6	6
3	(Spain) R Ramírez Hidalgo	2	2
5	(Argentina) C Berlocq	6	6

Semifinals
7	(Portugal) R Machado	6	6
5	(Argentina) C Berlocq	4	4

=== Bottom half ===
First round
6	(Spain) A Ramos-Viñolas	6	6
(Argentina) F Bagnis	3	1
(Argentina) JP Brzezicki	3	6	1
Q	(Argentina) P Galdón	6	3	6
(Argentina) M Alund	4	3
(Serbia) N Ćirić	6	6
(Spain) S Ventura	2	0	r
4	(Argentina) B Dabul	6	4
8	(Chile) N Massú	6	4	6
(Portugal) L Tavares	2	6	1
(France) É Prodon	4	7	3
(Paraguay) R Delgado	6	5	6
(Argentina) D Junqueira	2	6	4
(Brazil) R Dutra da Silva	6	3	6
Q	(Argentina) P Heras	1	3
2	(Spain) P Riba	6	6

Second round
6	(Spain) A Ramos-Viñolas	5	6	6^{1}
Q	(Argentina) P Galdón	7	1	7
(Serbia) N Ćirić	6	3	7
4	(Argentina) B Dabul	1	6	6^{4}
8	(Chile) N Massú	5	6	3
(Paraguay) R Delgado	7	2	6
(Brazil) R Dutra da Silva	6^{5}	5
2	(Spain) P Riba	7	7

Quarterfinals
Q	(Argentina) P Galdón	3	4
(Serbia) N Ćirić	6	6
(Paraguay) R Delgado	6	0	6
2	(Spain) P Riba	3	6	4

Semifinals
(Serbia) N Ćirić	3	2
(Paraguay) R Delgado	6	6
