= 2001 Cerveza Club Colombia Open =

- Date: January 28 – February 3
- Edition: 7th
- Category: International Series
- Prize money: $350,000
- Surface: Clay / outdoor
- Location: Bogotá, Colombia
- Venue: Club Campestre El Rancho

Champions

Singles
- (Spain) Fernando Vicente

Doubles
- (Argentina) Mariano Hood / (Argentina) Sebastián Prieto
- Cerveza Club Colombia Open

The 2001 Cerveza Club Colombia Open was a men's tennis tournament played on outdoor clay courts at the Club Campestre El Rancho in Bogotá in Colombia and was part of the International Series of the 2001 ATP Tour. It was the seventh edition of the tournament and was held from January 28 through February 3, 2001. Second-seeded Fernando Vicente won the singles title.

== Finals ==
=== Singles ===
(Spain) Fernando Vicente defeated (Argentina) Juan Ignacio Chela 6–4, 7–6^{(8–6)}

- It was Vicente's only singles title of the year and the 3rd and last of his career.

=== Doubles ===
(Argentina) Mariano Hood / (Argentina) Sebastián Prieto defeated (Argentina) Martín Rodríguez / (Brazil) André Sá 6–2, 6–4

- It was Hood's only doubles title of the year and the 4th of his career. It was Prieto's only doubles title of the year and the 3rd of his career.
