= 2010 Bancolombia Open – Singles =

Singles
- 2010 Bancolombia Open

Final
- Champion: (Brazil) João Souza
- Runner-up: (Colombia) Alejandro Falla
- Score: 4–6, 6–4, 6–1

Events
Singles	Doubles
← 2009 ·	Bancolombia Open

Horacio Zeballos was the defender of championship title, however he chose to participate at Houston.
João Souza won in the final 4–6, 6–4, 6–1 against Alejandro Falla.

== Seeds ==
1. (Colombia) Alejandro Falla (final)
2. (Colombia) Santiago Giraldo (semifinals)
3. (Italy) Paolo Lorenzi (quarterfinals)
4. (Ecuador) Nicolás Lapentti (second round)
5. (Brazil) Ricardo Mello (semifinals)
6. (Brazil) Thiago Alves (first round)
7. (United States) Kevin Kim (first round)
8. (Brazil) João Souza (champion)

== Draw ==
=== Key ===
- Q = Qualifier
- WC = Wild card
- LL = Lucky loser
- Alt = Alternate
- SE = Special exempt
- PR = Protected ranking
- ITF = ITF entry
- JE = Junior exempt
- w/o = Walkover
- r = Retired
- d = Defaulted
- SR = Special ranking

=== Finals ===
Semifinals
1	(Colombia) Alejandro Falla	7	6
WC	(Colombia) Juan Sebastián Cabal	6^{4}	4
8	(Brazil) João Souza	6	6
2	(Colombia) Santiago Giraldo	3	3

Final
1	(Colombia) Alejandro Falla	6	4	1
8	(Brazil) João Souza	4	6	6

=== Top half ===
First round
1	(Colombia) A Falla	7	5	6
Q	(Argentina) M Alund	6	7	3
(Brazil) C Zampieri	7	6
(Colombia) A González	6^{7}	4
WC	(United States) C Fiorentino	6^{4}	3
(Mexico) S González	7	6
Q	(Argentina) G Pella	7	6
6	(Brazil) T Alves	6^{8}	1
4	(Ecuador) N Lapentti	6	6
(Argentina) S Decoud	3	4
WC	(Colombia) JS Cabal	4	6	6
(Brazil) F Ferreiro	6	2	4
(France) A Sidorenko	6	6
(Spain) G Olaso	3	4
(Germany) A Begemann	3	6^{8}
5	(Brazil) R Mello	6	7

Second round
1	(Colombia) A Falla	5	6	6
(Brazil) C Zampieri	7	2	2
(Mexico) S González	6	5	7
Q	(Argentina) G Pella	1	7	6^{4}
4	(Ecuador) N Lapentti	2	4
WC	(Colombia) JS Cabal	6	6
(France) A Sidorenko	6	5	2
5	(Brazil) R Mello	4	7	6

Quarterfinals
1	(Colombia) A Falla	6	6
(Mexico) S González	3	1
WC	(Colombia) JS Cabal	6	2	6
5	(Brazil) R Mello	4	6	4

Semifinals
1	(Colombia) A Falla	7	6
WC	(Colombia) JS Cabal	6^{4}	4

=== Bottom half ===
First round
8	(Brazil) J Souza	3	7	6
(Brazil) J Silva	6	6^{5}	4
Q	(Hungary) A Balázs	6	6
(France) J Dasnières de Veigy	1	3
WC	(Colombia) JS Gómez	6^{3}	5
WC	(Colombia) E Struvay	7	7
(Brazil) R Hocevar	5	3
3	(Italy) P Lorenzi	7	6
7	(United States) K Kim	6	2	3
(Austria) P Oswald	3	6	6
(Ecuador) G Lapentti	6	6
(Argentina) G Gaudio	2	3
Q	(Spain) A Brugués-Davi	6^{5}	4
(Colombia) C Salamanca	7	6
(Germany) D Meffert	2	2
2	(Colombia) S Giraldo	6	6

Second round
8	(Brazil) J Souza	6	6
Q	(Hungary) A Balázs	2	2
WC	(Colombia) E Struvay	6^{1}	6^{4}
3	(Italy) P Lorenzi	7	7
(Austria) P Oswald	6^{5}	6	1
(Ecuador) G Lapentti	7	2	6
(Colombia) C Salamanca	4	2
2	(Colombia) S Giraldo	6	6

Quarterfinals
8	(Brazil) J Souza	7	4	6
3	(Italy) P Lorenzi	6^{4}	6	1
(Ecuador) G Lapentti	1	4
2	(Colombia) S Giraldo	6	6

Semifinals
8	(Brazil) J Souza	6	6
2	(Colombia) S Giraldo	3	3
