= 2010 Copa Petrobras Asunción =

- Date: 12–17 October
- Edition: 5th
- Location: Asunción, Paraguay

Champions

Singles
- (Portugal) Rui Machado

Doubles
- (Italy) Fabio Fognini / (Italy) Paolo Lorenzi
← 2009 ·	Copa Petrobras Asunción	· 2011 →

The 2010 Copa Petrobras Asunción was a professional tennis tournament played on clay courts. It was the fifth edition of the tournament which is part of the 2010 ATP Challenger Tour. It took place in Asunción, Paraguay between 12 and 17 October 2010.

== ATP entrants ==
=== Seeds ===
Country	Player	Rank^{1}	Seed
ITA	Fabio Fognini	65	1
ESP	Pere Riba	80	2
ESP	Rubén Ramírez Hidalgo	87	3
ARG	Brian Dabul	91	4
ARG	Carlos Berlocq	92	5
ESP	Albert Ramos-Viñolas	117	6
POR	Rui Machado	122	7
CHI	Nicolás Massú	128	8

- Rankings are as of October 4, 2010.

=== Other entrants ===
The following players received wildcards into the singles main draw:

- (Argentina) José Acasuso
- (Italy) Fabio Fognini
- (Paraguay) Diego Galeano
- (Paraguay) Daniel-Alejandro Lopez

The following players received entry from the qualifying draw:

- (Argentina) Pablo Galdón
- (Argentina) Patricio Heras
- (Argentina) Joaquín-Jesús Monteferrario
- (Argentina) Marco Trungelliti

== Champions ==
=== Singles ===
(Portugal) Rui Machado def. (Paraguay) Ramón Delgado, 6–2, 3–6, 7–5

=== Doubles ===
(Italy) Fabio Fognini / (Italy) Paolo Lorenzi def. (Argentina) Carlos Berlocq / (Argentina) Brian Dabul, 6–3, 6–4
