= Voit Mexico City Open =

Tournament information
- Location: Mexico City, Mexico
- Category: ATP Challenger Tour
- Surface: Clay / Outdoors
- Draw: 32S/32Q/16D
- Prize money: $125,000

The Voit Mexico City Open (also known as Corona Mexico City Open) was a tennis tournament held in Mexico City, Mexico from 2004 until 2007. The event was part of the ATP Challenger Tour and was played on outdoor clay courts.

== Past finals ==
=== Singles ===
Year	Champion	Runner-up	Score
2007	(Paraguay) Ramón Delgado	(Chile) Adrián García	6–3, 6–3
2006	(Paraguay) Ramón Delgado	(Colombia) Alejandro Falla	6–3, 4–6, 6–4
2005	(France) Florent Serra	(Brazil) Flávio Saretta	6–1, 6–4
2004	(Germany) Florian Mayer	(Chile) Adrián García	6–4, 6–3

=== Doubles ===
Year	Champions	Runners-up	Score
2007	(Brazil) Marcelo Melo (Argentina) Horacio Zeballos	(Paraguay) Ramón Delgado (Brazil) André Sá	6–4, 6–2
2006	(United States) Tripp Phillips (Netherlands) Rogier Wassen	(Germany) Michael Kohlmann (Germany) Alexander Waske	6–7^{(4–7)}, 6–4, [13–11]
2005	(Czech Republic) Lukáš Dlouhý (Czech Republic) Pavel Šnobel	(Brazil) Marcos Daniel (Brazil) Flávio Saretta	5–7, 6–4, 6–3
2004	(Australia) Ashley Fisher (United States) Tripp Phillips	(Argentina) Federico Browne (Netherlands) Rogier Wassen	6–4, 6–2
