= 2009 Copa Petrobras Asunción =

- Date: 12–18 October
- Edition: 4th
- Location: Asunción, Paraguay

Champions

Singles
- (Paraguay) Ramón Delgado

Doubles
- (Spain) Rubén Ramírez Hidalgo / (Spain) Santiago Ventura
← 2008 ·	Copa Petrobras Asunción	· 2010 →

The 2009 Copa Petrobras Asunción was a professional tennis tournament played on outdoor red clay courts. It was the fourth edition of the tournament which was part of the 2009 ATP Challenger Tour. It took place in Asunción, Paraguay between 12 and 18 October 2009.

== Singles main draw entrants ==
=== Seeds ===
Country	Player	Rank^{1}	Seed
ARG	Máximo González	68	1
CHI	Nicolás Massú	92	2
CHI	Paul Capdeville	95	3
ESP	Santiago Ventura	108	4
ESP	Daniel Gimeno-Traver	112	5
ESP	Rubén Ramírez Hidalgo	125	6
FRA	Laurent Recouderc	127	7
SLO	Blaž Kavčič	148	8

- Rankings are as of October 5, 2009.

=== Other entrants ===
The following players received wildcards into the singles main draw:

- (Paraguay) Ramón Delgado
- (Paraguay) Diego Galeano
- (Argentina) Mariano Puerta
- (Paraguay) Nicolás Salama

The following player received a Special Exempt into the singles main draw:

- (Argentina) Gastón Gaudio

The following players received entry from the qualifying draw:

- (Argentina) Facundo Bagnis
- (Brazil) Marcelo Demoliner
- (Argentina) Guido Pella
- (Spain) Carles Poch-Gradin

== Champions ==
=== Singles ===
(Paraguay) Ramón Delgado def. (Spain) Daniel Gimeno-Traver, 7–6(2), 1–6, 6–3

=== Doubles ===
(Spain) Rubén Ramírez Hidalgo / (Spain) Santiago Ventura def. (Argentina) Máximo González / (Argentina) Eduardo Schwank, 6–3, 0–6, [10–8]
