= 2009 Bancolombia Open – Singles =

Singles
- 2009 Bancolombia Open

Final
- Champion: (Argentina) Horacio Zeballos
- Runner-up: (Mexico) Santiago González
- Score: 7–6^{(7–3)}, 6–0

Events
Singles	Doubles
← 2008 ·	Bancolombia Open	· 2010 →

Marcos Daniel was the defending champion, but he decided to not defend his 2009 title.
Horacio Zeballos defeated Santiago González in the final (7–6^{(7–3)}, 6–0).

== Seeds ==
1. (Spain) Óscar Hernández (first round)
2. (Portugal) Frederico Gil (second round)
3. (Argentina) Brian Dabul (first round)
4. (Spain) Iván Navarro (first round)
5. (Argentina) Máximo González (second round)
6. (Argentina) Leonardo Mayer (first round, retired)
7. (Argentina) Sergio Roitman (first round)
8. (Brazil) Thiago Alves (second round)

== Draw ==
=== Key ===
- Q = Qualifier
- WC = Wild card
- LL = Lucky loser
- Alt = Alternate
- SE = Special exempt
- PR = Protected ranking
- ITF = ITF entry
- JE = Junior exempt
- w/o = Walkover
- r = Retired
- d = Defaulted
- SR = Special ranking

=== Final four ===
Semifinals
(Brazil) Franco Ferreiro	6	1	4
(Mexico) Santiago González	2	6	6
(Ecuador) Giovanni Lapentti	6^{5}	7	5
(Argentina) Horacio Zeballos	7	5	7

Final
(Mexico) Santiago González	6^{3}	0
(Argentina) Horacio Zeballos	7	6

=== Top half ===
First round
1	(Spain) Ó Hernández	6	2	6^{4}
(Argentina) M Puerta	4	6	7
SE	(Argentina) M Zabaleta	3	4
(Argentina) S Decoud	6	6
Q	(Italy) R Ghedin	3	0
(Brazil) F Ferreiro	6	6
(Dominican Republic) V Estrella	6	2
6	(Argentina) L Mayer	4	0	r
4	(Spain) I Navarro	6^{2}	4
Q	(Argentina) Juan Pablo Amado	7	6
(Mexico) S González	2	6	6
(Spain) F Vicente	6	4	3
Q	(Argentina) D Álvarez	6	6
WC	(Colombia) A González	4	4
WC	(Colombia) C Salamanca	7	5	6^{3}
5	(Argentina) M González	5	7	7

Second round
(Argentina) M Puerta	6	7
(Argentina) S Decoud	2	6^{7}
(Brazil) F Ferreiro	6	6
(Dominican Republic) V Estrella	4	2
Q	(Argentina) JP Amado	6^{1}	5
(Mexico) S González	7	7
Q	(Argentina) D Álvarez	6	7
5	(Argentina) M González	0	5

Quarterfinals
(Argentina) M Puerta	4	4
(Brazil) F Ferreiro	6	6
(Mexico) S González	6	6
Q	(Argentina) D Álvarez	4	3

Semifinals
(Brazil) F Ferreiro	6	1	4
(Mexico) S González	2	6	6

=== Bottom half ===
First round
8	(Brazil) T Alves	7	6
(Mexico) B Echagaray	5	1
WC	(Colombia) JS Cabal	6	3	4
(Ecuador) G Lapentti	3	6	6
Q	(Uruguay) M Felder	3	4
(Brazil) R Mello	6	6
WC	(Colombia) M Quintero	6	6
3	(Argentina) B Dabul	3	3
7	(Argentina) S Roitman	1	4
(Argentina) H Zeballos	6	6
(Brazil) J Souza	1	7	7
(Argentina) J-P Guzmán	6	6^{8}	6^{0}
(Brazil) R Hocevar	7	3	6
(Colombia) A Falla	6^{3}	6	3
(Austria) A Peya	6^{7}	1
2	(Portugal) F Gil	7	6

Second round
8	(Brazil) T Alves	2	7	3
(Ecuador) G Lapentti	6	6^{3}	6
(Brazil) R Mello	1	7	6
WC	(Colombia) M Quintero	6	6^{1}	1
(Argentina) H Zeballos	7	7
(Brazil) J Souza	6^{5}	5
(Brazil) R Hocevar	6	6
2	(Portugal) F Gil	4	4

Quarterfinals
(Ecuador) G Lapentti	6	6
(Brazil) R Mello	4	2
(Argentina) H Zeballos	6	7
(Brazil) R Hocevar	3	6^{7}

Semifinals
(Ecuador) G Lapentti	6^{5}	7	5
(Argentina) H Zeballos	7	5	7
