= 1998 Cerveza Club Colombia Open =

- Date: 2–8 November
- Edition: 5th
- Category: World Series
- Draw: 32S / 16D
- Prize money: $315,000
- Surface: Clay / outdoor
- Location: Bogotá, Colombia

Champions

Singles
- (Argentina) Mariano Zabaleta

Doubles
- (Argentina) Diego del Río / (Argentina) Mariano Puerta
- Cerveza Club Colombia Open

The 1998 Cerveza Club Colombia Open was a men's tennis tournament played on outdoor clay courts in Bogotá, Colombia that was part of the World Series category of the 1998 ATP Tour. It was the fifth edition of the tournament and was held from 2 November until 8 November. Unseeded Mariano Zabaleta won the singles title.

== Finals ==
=== Singles ===
(Argentina) Mariano Zabaleta defeated (Paraguay) Ramón Delgado, 6–4, 6–4

- It was Zabaleta's only singles title of the year and the 1st of his career.

=== Doubles ===
(Argentina) Diego del Río / (Argentina) Mariano Puerta defeated (Hungary) Gábor Köves / (Philippines) Eric Taino, 6–7, 6–3, 6–2

- It was del Río's only doubles title of his career. It was Puerta's only doubles title of the year and the 1st of his career.
