= 2010 Bancolombia Open – Doubles =

Doubles
- 2010 Bancolombia Open

Final
- Champions: (Brazil) Franco Ferreiro (Mexico) Santiago González
- Runners-up: (Germany) Dominik Meffert (Austria) Philipp Oswald
- Score: 6–3, 5–7, [10–7]

Events
Singles	Doubles
- Bancolombia Open

Sebastián Prieto and Horacio Zeballos were the defending champions, but Zeballos chose to participate at the U.S. Men's Clay Court Championships instead.
Prieto chose to play with Giovanni Lapentti. They lost to Dominik Meffert and Philipp Oswald in the semifinals.
Franco Ferreiro and Santiago González won in the final 6–3, 5–7, [10–7], against Meffert and Oswald.

== Seeds ==
1. (Brazil) Franco Ferreiro / (Mexico) Santiago González (champions)
2. (Germany) Dominik Meffert / (Austria) Philipp Oswald (final)
3. (Argentina) Diego Cristín / (Brazil) Márcio Torres (first round)
4. (Brazil) Ricardo Hocevar / (Brazil) João Souza (semifinals)

== Draw ==
Key

- Q = Qualifier
- WC = Wild card
- LL = Lucky loser
- Alt = Alternate
- ITF = ITF entry
- PR = Protected ranking
- SR = Special ranking
- SE = Special exempt
- JE = Junior exempt
- JR = Junior Accelerator Programme entrant
- CO = College Accelerator Programme entrant
- NG = Next Gen Accelerator Program entrant
- w/o = Walkover
- r = Retired
- d = Defaulted

=== Draw ===
First round
1	(Brazil) F Ferreiro (Mexico) S González	3	6	[12]
(Germany) A Begemann (Austria) M Slanar	6	3	[10]
(Italy) P Lorenzi (Brazil) C Zampieri	7	7
(Argentina) S Decoud (Colombia) C Salamanca	6^{3}	6^{1}
4	(Brazil) R Hocevar (Brazil) J Souza	6^{4}	6	[10]
(Brazil) T Alves (Brazil) R Mello	7	3	[3]
(Spain) G Olaso (Brazil) J Silva	6	7
WC	(Colombia) M Quintero (Colombia) S Serrano	3	6^{2}
(Ecuador) G Lapentti (Argentina) S Prieto	6	7
(France) J Dasnières de Veigy (France) A Sidorenko	3	6^{8}
(Colombia) JS Cabal (Colombia) A Falla	7	6
3	(Argentina) D Cristín (Brazil) M Torres	5	3
(Hungary) A Balázs (United States) K Kim	4	r
WC	(Ecuador) E Gómez (Ecuador) N Lapentti	6
WC	(Colombia) A González (Colombia) E Struvay	3	4
2	(Germany) D Meffert (Austria) P Oswald	6	6

Quarterfinals
1	(Brazil) F Ferreiro (Mexico) S González	7	6
(Italy) P Lorenzi (Brazil) C Zampieri	6^{1}	3
4	(Brazil) R Hocevar (Brazil) J Souza	6	7
(Spain) G Olaso (Brazil) J Silva	2	5
(Ecuador) G Lapentti (Argentina) S Prieto	2	6	[12]
(Colombia) JS Cabal (Colombia) A Falla	6	3	[10]
WC	(Ecuador) E Gómez (Ecuador) N Lapentti	3	7	[8]
2	(Germany) D Meffert (Austria) P Oswald	6	6^{1}	[10]

Semifinals
1	(Brazil) F Ferreiro (Mexico) S González	6	7
4	(Brazil) R Hocevar (Brazil) J Souza	4	5
(Ecuador) G Lapentti (Argentina) S Prieto	6^{5}	4
2	(Germany) D Meffert (Austria) P Oswald	7	6

Finals
1	(Brazil) F Ferreiro (Mexico) S González	6	5	[10]
2	(Germany) D Meffert (Austria) P Oswald	3	7	[7]
