= 2010 Bancolombia Open =

- Date: April 5–11
- Edition: 14th
- Category: ATP Challenger Tour
- Location: Bogotá, Colombia

Champions

Singles
- (Brazil) João Souza

Doubles
- (Brazil) Franco Ferreiro / (Mexico) Santiago González
- Bancolombia Open

The 2010 Bancolombia Open is a professional tennis tournament played on indoor red clay courts. It is part of the 2010 ATP Challenger Tour. It took place in Bogotá, Colombia between 5 and 12 April 2010.

== Finals ==
=== Singles ===
(Brazil) João Souza defeated (Colombia) Alejandro Falla, 4–6, 6–4, 6–1

=== Doubles ===
(Brazil) Franco Ferreiro / (Mexico) Santiago González defeated (Germany) Dominik Meffert / (Austria) Philipp Oswald, 6–3, 5–7, [10–7]

== Singles main draw entrants ==
=== Seeds ===
| Nationality | Player | Ranking* | Seeding |
|---|---|---|---|
| COL | Alejandro Falla | 70 | 1 |
| COL | Santiago Giraldo | 88 | 2 |
| ITA | Paolo Lorenzi | 90 | 3 |
| ECU | Nicolás Lapentti | 102 | 4 |
| BRA | Ricardo Mello | 106 | 5 |
| BRA | Thiago Alves | 123 | 6 |
| USA | Kevin Kim | 128 | 7 |
| BRA | João Souza | 156 | 8 |

- Rankings are as of March 22, 2010.

=== Other entrants ===
The following players received wildcards into the singles main draw:

- (Colombia) Juan Sebastián Cabal
- (United States) Carlton Fiorentino
- (Colombia) Juan Sebastián Gómez
- (Colombia) Eduardo Struvay

The following players received entry from the qualifying draw:

- (Argentina) Martín Alund
- (Hungary) Attila Balázs
- (Spain) Arnau Brugués-Davi
- (Argentina) Guido Pella
