= 2000 Cerveza Club Colombia Open =

- Date: 6–12 March
- Edition: 6th
- Category: International Series
- Prize money: $350,000
- Surface: Clay / outdoor
- Location: Bogotá, Colombia
- Venue: Club Campestre El Rancho

Champions

Singles
- (Argentina) Mariano Puerta

Doubles
- (Argentina) Pablo Albano / (Argentina) Lucas Arnold Ker
- Cerveza Club Colombia Open

The 2000 Cerveza Club Colombia Open was a men's tennis tournament played on outdoor clay courts at the Club Campestre El Rancho in Bogotá in Colombia and was part of the International Series of the 2000 ATP Tour. It was the sixth edition of the tournament and was held from 6 March through 12 March 2000. Unseeded Mariano Puerta won the singles title.

== Finals ==
=== Singles ===
(Argentina) Mariano Puerta defeated (Morocco) Younes El Aynaoui 6–4, 7–6^{(7–5)}

- It was Puerta's only singles title of the year and the 2nd of his career.

=== Doubles ===
(Argentina) Pablo Albano / (Argentina) Lucas Arnold Ker defeated (Spain) Joan Balcells / (Colombia) Mauricio Hadad 7–6^{(7–4)}, 1–6, 6–2

- It was Albano's 1st doubles title of the year and the 8th of his career. It was Arnold Ker's only doubles title of the year and the 6th of his career.
