= 2009 Bancolombia Open =

Professional tennis tournament

- Date: 16–22 March
- Edition: 13th
- Category: ATP Challenger Tour
- Surface: Clay / outdoor
- Location: Bogotá, Colombia

Champions

Singles
- (Argentina) Horacio Zeballos

Doubles
- (Argentina) Sebastián Prieto / (Argentina) Horacio Zeballos
- Bancolombia Open

The 2009 Bancolombia Open was a professional tennis tournament played on outdoor red clay courts. It was part of the 2009 ATP Challenger Tour. It took place in Bogotá, Colombia between 16 and 22 March 2009.

== Finals ==
=== Singles ===
(Argentina) Horacio Zeballos defeated (Mexico) Santiago González, 7–6^{(7–3)}, 6–0

=== Doubles ===
(Argentina) Sebastián Prieto / (Argentina) Horacio Zeballos defeated (Austria) Alexander Peya / (Spain) Fernando Vicente, 4–6, 6–1, [11–9]

== Singles entrants ==
=== Seeds ===
Nationality	Player	Ranking*	Seeding
ESP	Óscar Hernández	67	1
POR	Frederico Gil	79	2
ARG	Brian Dabul	82	3
ESP	Iván Navarro	83	4
ARG	Máximo González	96	5
ARG	Leonardo Mayer	97	6
ARG	Sergio Roitman	103	7
BRA	Thiago Alves	123	8

- Rankings are as of March 9, 2009.

=== Other entrants ===
The following players received wildcards into the singles main draw:

- (Colombia) Juan Sebastián Cabal
- (Colombia) Alejandro González
- (Colombia) Michael Quintero
- (Colombia) Carlos Salamanca

The following players received entry from the qualifying draw:

- (Argentina) Juan Pablo Amado
- (Argentina) Diego Álvarez
- (Uruguay) Marcel Felder
- (Italy) Riccardo Ghedin
