= Ignacio Hirigoyen =

Argentine tennis player

- Country (sports): Argentina
- Residence: Dallas, Texas
- Born: 23 January 1976 (age 49); Bahía Blanca, Argentina
- Height: 1.83 m (6 ft 0 in)
- Turned pro: 1999
- Plays: Right-handed
- College: Southern Methodist University
- Prize money: $108,737

Singles
- Career record: 1–3
- Career titles: 0
- Highest ranking: No. 231 (17 September 2001)

Grand Slam singles results
- Australian Open: Q2 (2003)
- Wimbledon: Q2 (2002, 2003)
- US Open: Q1 (2001, 2003)

Doubles
- Career record: 0–2
- Career titles: 0
- Highest ranking: No. 144 (15 September 2003)

Grand Slam doubles results
- Wimbledon: Q2 (2002)

Ignacio Hirigoyen (born 23 January 1976) is a former professional tennis player from Argentina.

== Career ==
Hirigoyen was an NCAA All-American for the Southern Methodist University (SMU) in 1999. His 34 singles wins that year was a SMU record.

He defeated Peru's Luis Horna at the 2001 Cerveza Club Colombia Open, then lost in the second round to Fernando Vicente. This was his only win on the ATP Tour.

== Personal life ==
Hirigoyen has two daughters and a wife and currently resides in Dallas, Texas. He is also a lawyer.

== Challenger titles ==
=== Doubles: (1) ===
No.	Year	Tournament	Surface	Partner	Opponents	Score
1.	2001	Buenos Aires, Argentina	Clay	(Argentina) Federico Browne	(Argentina) Gastón Etlis (Argentina) Martín Rodríguez	6–4, 7–6^{(8–6)}
