= Club Campestre El Rancho =

Tennis and golf venue in Bogotá, Colombia

Coordinates: 4.774472°N 74.045749°W

The Club Campestre El Rancho is a tennis and golf venue in Bogotá, Colombia. Until 2012, the club was the host of the Copa Colsanitas, a WTA Tour Tier-III event (2001–2008), and from 2009 a WTA International tournament. The club previously hosted an ATP Tour event from 1994–2001. The club has 25 clay courts and a stadium court for 2,500 spectators.
