= Copa Petrobras Asunción =

Tennis tournament in Paraguay

Defunct tennis tournament
- Location: Asunción, Paraguay
- Venue: Yacht y Golf Club Paraguayo
- Category: ATP Challenger Tour
- Surface: Clay / Outdoors
- Draw: 32S/16Q/16D
- Prize money: $75,000
- Website: Official Website

The Copa Petrobras Asunción was a tennis tournament that was held in Asunción, Paraguay, from 2006 to 2010. The event was part of the ATP Challenger Tour and was played on outdoor clay courts.

== Past finals ==
=== Singles ===
Year	Champion	Runner-up	Score
2010	(Portugal) Rui Machado	(Paraguay) Ramón Delgado	6–2, 3–6, 7–5
2009	(Paraguay) Ramón Delgado	(Spain) Daniel Gimeno-Traver	7–6(2), 1–6, 6–3
2008	(Argentina) Martín Vassallo Argüello	(Argentina) Leonardo Mayer	3–6, 6–3, 7–6
2007	(Brazil) Franco Ferreiro	(Argentina) Martín Vassallo Argüello	6–4, RET.
2006	(Argentina) Guillermo Cañas	(Brazil) Flávio Saretta	6–4, 6–1

=== Doubles ===
Year	Champion	Runner-up	Score
2010	(Italy) Fabio Fognini (Italy) Paolo Lorenzi	(Argentina) Carlos Berlocq (Argentina) Brian Dabul	6–3, 6–4
2009	(Spain) Rubén Ramírez Hidalgo (Spain) Santiago Ventura	(Argentina) Máximo González (Argentina) Eduardo Schwank	6–3, 0–6, [10–8]
2008	(Argentina) Alejandro Fabbri (Argentina) Leonardo Mayer	(Argentina) Martín García (Argentina) Mariano Hood	7–5, 6–4
2007	(Argentina) Carlos Berlocq (Argentina) Martín Vassallo Argüello	(Chile) Adrián García (Spain) Bartolomé Salvá-Vidal	7–5, 6–7, [13–11]
2006	(Germany) Tomas Behrend (Brazil) André Ghem	(Argentina) Carlos Berlocq (Argentina) Martín Vassallo Argüello	3–6, 6–3, [10–3]
