= Martín Rodríguez (tennis) =

Argentine tennis player

- Country (sports): Argentina
- Residence: Buenos Aires, Argentina
- Born: 18 December 1969 (age 55); Córdoba, Argentina
- Height: 1.78 m (5 ft 10 in)
- Turned pro: 1991
- Retired: 2008
- Plays: Right-handed
- Prize money: $1,221,361

Singles
- Career record: 16–40
- Career titles: 0
- Highest ranking: No. 71 (14 June 1999)

Grand Slam singles results
- Australian Open: 1R (2000)
- French Open: 2R (1999)
- Wimbledon: 1R (1999)
- US Open: 1R (1998, 1999)

Doubles
- Career record: 143–151
- Career titles: 6
- Highest ranking: No. 15 (25 October 2004)

Grand Slam doubles results
- Australian Open: SF (2003, 2004)
- French Open: QF (2003, 2004)
- Wimbledon: 3R (2003, 2005)
- US Open: 1R (1998, 1999, 2001, 2002, 2003, 2004, 2005)

Other doubles tournaments
- Tour Finals: SF (2003)
- Olympic Games: 2R (2004)

Martín Rodríguez (Latin American Spanish: [maɾˈtin roˈðɾiɣes]; born 18 December 1969) is a former professional tennis player from Argentina. Rodríguez turned professional in 1991. He reached his career-high singles ranking when he became World Number 71 on June 14, 1999. On 25 October 2004, he reached his career-high doubles rank, when he became World Number 15.

Rodríguez's coach was Horacio de la Peña. He currently resides in Buenos Aires.

After testing positive for an excessive amount of caffeine, Rodríguez forfeited prize money and ranking points from the 2002 ATP tournament in Basel.

Rodríguez is brother-in-law to Chilean former tennis player Jaime Fillol Jr., son-in-law of Jaime Fillol and, through his wife, is an uncle of Nicolás Jarry.

== ATP career finals ==
=== Doubles: 14 (6 titles, 8 runner-ups) ===
Legend Grand Slam Tournaments (0–0) ATP World Tour Finals (0–0) ATP Masters Series (0–1) ATP Championship Series (0–2) ATP World Series (6–5)	Finals by surface Hard (2–1) Clay (4–7) Grass (0–0) Carpet (0–0)	Finals by setting Outdoors (6–7) Indoors (0–1)

Result	W/L	Date	Tournament	Surface	Partner	Opponents	Score
Loss	0–1	Feb 2000	Mexico City, Mexico	Clay	(Argentina) Gastón Etlis	(Zimbabwe) Byron Black (United States) Donald Johnson	3–6, 5–7
Loss	0–2	Feb 2001	Bogotá, Colombia	Clay	(Brazil) André Sá	(Argentina) Mariano Hood (Argentina) Sebastián Prieto	6–2, 6–4
Win	1–2	Feb 2002	Viña del Mar, Chile	Clay	(Argentina) Gastón Etlis	(Argentina) Lucas Arnold Ker (Argentina) Luis Lobo	6–3, 6–4
Win	2–2	Feb 2002	Buenos Aires, Argentina	Clay	(Argentina) Gastón Etlis	(Sweden) Simon Aspelin (Australia) Andrew Kratzmann	3–6, 6–3, [10–4]
Win	3–2	Aug 2003	Long Island, U.S.	Hard	(South Africa) Robbie Koenig	(Czech Republic) Cyril Suk (Czech Republic) Martin Damm	6–3, 7–6^{(7–4)}
Loss	3–3	Feb 2004	Viña del Mar, Chile	Clay	(Ecuador) Nicolás Lapentti	(Argentina) Juan Ignacio Chela (Argentina) Gastón Gaudio	6–7^{(2–7)}, 6–7^{(3–7)}
Win	4–3	Apr 2004	Valencia, Spain	Clay	(Argentina) Gastón Etlis	(Spain) Feliciano López (Spain) Marc López	7–5, 7–6^{(7–5)}
Loss	4–4	Apr 2004	Monte Carlo, Monaco	Clay	(Argentina) Gastón Etlis	(United Kingdom) Tim Henman (Serbia and Montenegro) Nenad Zimonjić	5–7, 2–6
Loss	4–5	Sep 2004	Delray Beach, U.S.	Clay	(Argentina) Gastón Etlis	(India) Leander Paes (Czech Republic) Radek Štěpánek	0–6, 3–6
Loss	4–6	Sep 2004	Palermo, Italy	Clay	(Argentina) Gastón Etlis	(Argentina) Lucas Arnold Ker (Argentina) Mariano Hood	5–7, 2–6
Loss	4–7	Oct 2004	Vienna, Austria	Hard	(Argentina) Gastón Etlis	(Czech Republic) Martin Damm (Czech Republic) Cyril Suk	7–6^{(7–4)}, 4–6, 6–7^{(4–7)}
Loss	4–8	Feb 2005	Viña del Mar, Chile	Clay	(Argentina) Gastón Etlis	(Spain) David Ferrer (Spain) Santiago Ventura	3–6, 4–6
Win	5–8	Aug 2005	New Haven, United States	Hard	(Argentina) Gastón Etlis	(United States) Rajeev Ram (United States) Bobby Reynolds	6–4, 6–3
Win	6–8	Apr 2005	Valencia, Spain	Clay	(Chile) Fernando González	(Argentina) Lucas Arnold Ker (Argentina) Mariano Hood	6–4, 6–4

== ATP Challenger and ITF Futures finals ==
=== Singles: 9 (1–8) ===
Legend ATP Challenger (1–8) ITF Futures (0–0)	Finals by surface Hard (0–0) Clay (1–8) Grass (0–0) Carpet (0–0)

Result	W–L	Date	Tournament	Tier	Surface	Opponent	Score
Loss	0–1	Aug 1994	Geneva, Switzerland	Challenger	Clay	(Spain) José Francisco Altur	6–7, 4–6
Loss	0–2	Jul 1998	Ostend, Belgium	Challenger	Clay	(Australia) Andrew Ilie	2–6, 2–6
Loss	0–3	Aug 1998	Scheveningen, Netherlands	Challenger	Clay	(Morocco) Younes El Aynaoui	3–6, 1–6
Loss	0–4	Aug 1998	Poznań, Poland	Challenger	Clay	(Norway) Christian Ruud	6–1, 3–6, 3–6
Loss	0–5	Feb 1999	Punta del Este, Uruguay	Challenger	Clay	(Argentina) Marcelo Charpentier	2–6, 2–6
Loss	0–6	May 1999	Birmingham, United States	Challenger	Clay	(Brazil) Francisco Costa	7–6, 6–7, 3–6
Loss	0–7	Apr 2000	Cagliari, Italy	Challenger	Clay	(Italy) Andrea Gaudenzi	6–2, 5–7, 2–6
Loss	0–8	Jul 2000	Scheveningen, Netherlands	Challenger	Clay	(France) Nicolas Coutelot	3–6, ret.
Win	1–8	Apr 2001	San Luis Potosí, Mexico	Challenger	Clay	(Czech Republic) Ota Fukárek	6–7^{(7–9)}, 7–6^{(7–2)}, 7–6^{(10–8)}

=== Doubles: 17 (11–6) ===
Legend ATP Challenger (11–6) ITF Futures (0–0)	Finals by surface Hard (0–1) Clay (11–5) Grass (0–0) Carpet (0–0)

Result	W–L	Date	Tournament	Tier	Surface	Partner	Opponents	Score
Win	1–0	Feb 1993	Viña del Mar, Chile	Challenger	Clay	(Chile) Marcelo Rebolledo	(Russia) Andrey Merinov (Italy) Laurence Tieleman	6–3, 7–6
Loss	1–1	Sep 1996	Brașov, Romania	Challenger	Clay	(Argentina) Mariano Hood	(Romania) George Cosac (Romania) Dinu Pescariu	6–7, 1–6
Win	2–1	Dec 1996	Santiago, Chile	Challenger	Clay	(Argentina) Gastón Etlis	(Peru) Alejandro Aramburú Acuña (Paraguay) Ramón Delgado	6–4, 6–4
Win	3–1	Feb 1997	Punta del Este, Uruguay	Challenger	Clay	(Argentina) Daniel Orsanic	(Brazil) Nelson Aerts (Brazil) Fernando Meligeni	6–2, 6–4
Loss	3–2	Jul 1997	Venice, Italy	Challenger	Clay	(Mexico) David Roditi	(Italy) Giorgio Galimberti (Italy) Massimo Valeri	4–6, 6–0, 6–7
Loss	3–3	Jun 1998	Furth, Germany	Challenger	Clay	(Spain) Juan Ignacio Carrasco	(Spain) Álex López Morón (Spain) Albert Portas	4–6, 4–6
Win	4–3	Jul 1998	Contrexéville, France	Challenger	Clay	(Argentina) Diego del Río	(Spain) Álex López Morón (Spain) Jairo Velasco	7–6, 4–6, 6–4
Loss	4–4	Aug 1998	Scheveningen, Netherlands	Challenger	Clay	(Argentina) Sebastián Prieto	(Argentina) Agustín Calleri (Sweden) Tobias Hildebrand	2–6, 6–3, 2–6
Win	5–4	Aug 1998	Poznań, Poland	Challenger	Clay	(Argentina) Sebastián Prieto	(Italy) Cristian Brandi (Brazil) Márcio Carlsson	6–3, 6–4
Win	6–4	Oct 1998	São Paulo, Brazil	Challenger	Clay	(Argentina) Diego del Río	(Netherlands) Edwin Kempes (Netherlands) Peter Wessels	7–6, 6–3
Win	7–4	Nov 1998	Lima, Peru	Challenger	Clay	(Argentina) Diego del Río	(Argentina) Federico Browne (Argentina) Eduardo Medica	6–4, 7–6
Loss	7–5	Jun 1999	Furth, Germany	Challenger	Clay	(Argentina) Diego del Río	(Socialist Federal Republic of Yugoslavia) Nebojša Đorđević (South Africa) Marcos Ondruska	6–4, 3–6, 4–6
Win	8–5	Dec 1999	Caracas, Venezuela	Challenger	Clay	(Argentina) Gastón Etlis	(Venezuela) José de Armas (Venezuela) Jimy Szymanski	6–4, 6–3
Loss	8–6	Jun 2000	Szczecin, Poland	Challenger	Clay	(Argentina) Mariano Hood	(Spain) Alberto Martín (Israel) Eyal Ran	6–7^{(2–7)}, 7–6^{(7–5)}, 2–6
Win	9–6	Oct 2000	Lima, Peru	Challenger	Clay	(Argentina) Gastón Etlis	(Argentina) Juan Ignacio Chela (Peru) Luis Horna	6–2, 5–2 ret.
Win	10–6	Sep 2001	Florianópolis, Brazil	Challenger	Clay	(Argentina) Gastón Etlis	(Australia) Stephen Huss (Australia) Lee Pearson	6–2, 6–1
Win	11–6	Oct 2001	Guadalajara, Mexico	Challenger	Clay	(Argentina) Gastón Etlis	(Argentina) Agustín Calleri (Argentina) Ignacio Hirigoyen	7–5, 7–5
Loss	11–7	Nov 2001	Buenos Aires, Argentina	Challenger	Clay	(Argentina) Gastón Etlis	(Argentina) Federico Browne (Argentina) Ignacio Hirigoyen	4–6, 6–7^{(6–8)}
Loss	11–8	Mar 2002	Salinas, Ecuador	Challenger	Hard	(Argentina) Diego Veronelli	(United States) Brandon Coupe (United States) Jeff Salzenstein	7–6^{(7–3)}4–6, 6–7^{(3–7)}

== Performance timelines ==
Key
W	F	SF	QF	#R	RR	Q#	P#	DNQ	A	Z#	PO	G	S	B	NMS	NTI	P	NH

(W) winner; (F) finalist; (SF) semifinalist; (QF) quarterfinalist; (#R) rounds 4, 3, 2, 1; (RR) round-robin stage; (Q#) qualification round; (P#) preliminary round; (DNQ) did not qualify; (A) absent; (Z#) Davis/Fed Cup Zonal Group (with number indication) or (PO) play-off; (G) gold, (S) silver or (B) bronze Olympic/Paralympic medal; (NMS) not a Masters tournament; (NTI) not a Tier I tournament; (P) postponed; (NH) not held; (SR) strike rate (events won / competed); (W–L) win–loss record.

=== Singles ===
Tournament	1994	1995	1996	1997	1998	1999	2000	2001	2002	2003	SR	W–L	Win%
Grand Slam tournaments
Australian Open	A	A	A	A	A	A	1R	A	A	A	0 / 1	0–1	0%
French Open	Q1	Q1	Q1	Q1	1R	2R	1R	Q1	A	A	0 / 3	1–3	25%
Wimbledon	A	A	Q2	Q1	A	1R	A	Q1	A	A	0 / 1	0–1	0%
US Open	A	A	A	A	1R	1R	A	Q1	A	A	0 / 2	0–2	0%
Win–loss	0–0	0–0	0–0	0–0	0–2	1–3	0–2	0–0	0–0	0–0	0 / 7	1–7	13%
ATP Tour Masters 1000
Indian Wells	A	A	A	A	A	Q1	A	A	A	A	0 / 0	0–0	–
Miami	A	Q2	A	A	A	Q1	A	Q2	A	A	0 / 0	0–0	–
Monte Carlo	A	Q2	Q1	A	A	A	Q1	A	A	A	0 / 0	0–0	–
Madrid	Not Masters Series								A	Q2	0 / 0	0–0	–
Win–loss	0–0	0–0	0–0	0–0	0–0	0–0	0–0	0–0	0–0	0–0	0 / 0	0–0	–

=== Doubles ===
Tournament	1998	1999	2000	2001	2002	2003	2004	2005	SR	W–L	Win%	
Grand Slam tournaments
Australian Open	A	A	1R	A	A	SF	SF	1R	0 / 4	8–4	67%	
French Open	A	3R	3R	2R	1R	QF	QF	2R	0 / 7	12–7	63%	
Wimbledon	A	1R	1R	1R	1R	3R	2R	3R	0 / 7	5–7	42%	
US Open	1R	1R	A	1R	1R	1R	1R	1R	0 / 7	0–7	0%	
Win–loss	0–1	2–3	2–3	1–3	0–3	9–4	8–4	3–4	0 / 25	25–25	50%	
National Representation
Summer Olympics	NH			A	Not Held			2R	NH	0 / 1	1–1	50%
Year-End Championships
ATP Finals	Did not qualify					SF	RR	DNQ	0 / 2	1–6	14%	
ATP Tour Masters 1000
Indian Wells	A	A	A	A	A	1R	1R	QF	0 / 3	2–3	40%	
Miami	A	1R	A	2R	QF	2R	1R	A	0 / 5	5–5	50%	
Monte Carlo	A	A	Q2	A	A	1R	F	2R	0 / 3	4–3	57%	
Rome	A	A	A	A	A	A	2R	2R	0 / 2	2–2	50%	
Hamburg	A	A	A	A	A	A	2R	2R	0 / 2	1–2	33%	
Canada	A	A	A	A	A	2R	2R	2R	0 / 3	3–3	50%	
Cincinnati	A	A	A	A	A	QF	1R	1R	0 / 3	2–3	40%	
Madrid	Not Masters Series				A	1R	2R	A	0 / 2	1–2	33%	
Paris	A	A	A	A	A	2R	1R	A	0 / 2	1–2	33%	
Win–loss	0–0	0–1	0–0	1–1	3–1	5–7	6–9	6–6	0 / 25	21–25	46%	
