= André Sá =

Brazilian tennis player

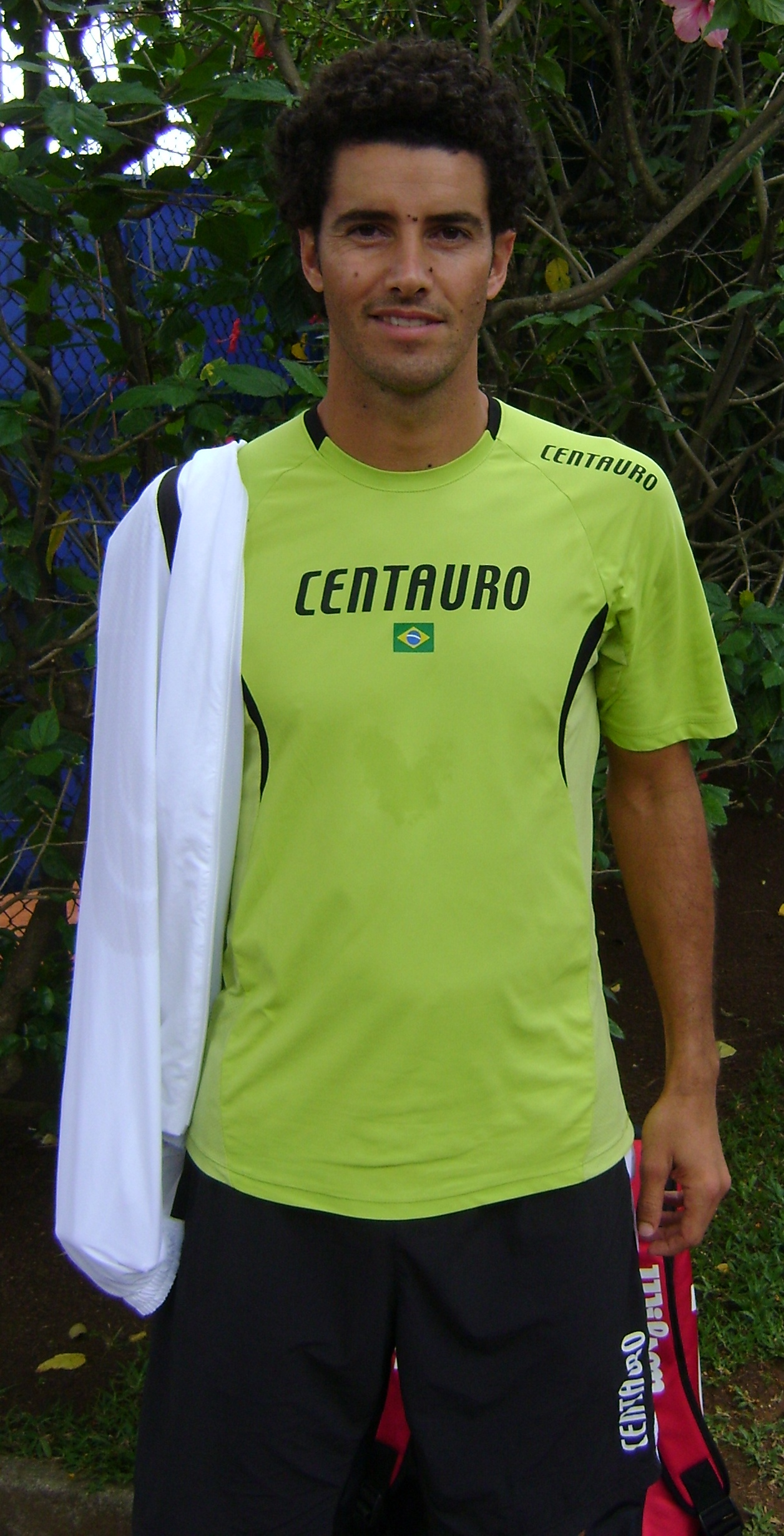
- Full name: André Rezende Sá
- Country (sports): Brazil
- Born: 6 May 1977 (age 49) Belo Horizonte, Brazil
- Height: 1.85 m (6 ft 1 in)
- Turned pro: 1996
- Retired: 2018
- Plays: Right-handed (two-handed backhand)
- Prize money: $2,632,597

Singles
- Career record: 52–92
- Career titles: 0
- Highest ranking: No. 55 (12 August 2002)

Grand Slam singles results
- Australian Open: 2R (2001)
- French Open: 1R (2000, 2002, 2003)
- Wimbledon: QF (2002)
- US Open: 2R (2000, 2001)

Doubles
- Career record: 291–306
- Career titles: 11
- Highest ranking: No. 17 (2 February 2009)

Grand Slam doubles results
- Australian Open: QF (2004)
- French Open: 3R (2002, 2010, 2013, 2014, 2015, 2016)
- Wimbledon: SF (2007)
- US Open: QF (2007, 2016)

Other doubles tournaments
- Olympic Games: 2R (2004, 2008, 2016)

Grand Slam mixed doubles results
- Australian Open: 1R (2009, 2010, 2013)
- French Open: QF (2008, 2009)
- Wimbledon: 2R (2010, 2016)
- US Open: 2R (2009)

Team competitions
- Davis Cup: SF (2000)

André Rezende Sá (Portuguese pronunciation: [ɐ̃ˈdɾɛ ˈsa]; born 6 May 1977) is a former Brazilian tennis player.

In singles, he was a Wimbledon quarterfinalist in 2002. Sá reached the semifinals of ATP tournaments in Memphis and Hong Kong in 2000 and 2001 respectively. He reached a career-high doubles ranking of world No. 17, winning 11 doubles titles.

== Personal ==
Sá started playing tennis at the age of eight, encouraged by his older brother. At the age of 12 and ranked number one in Brazil, he moved to the Nick Bollettieri Tennis Academy in Bradenton, Florida, where he stayed for five years. In 1996, he graduated from Brandenton Academy, where he played basketball for three years.

In 2019 Andre Sá and his family moved to Australia after being appointed to head of player liaison for Tennis Australia.

== Professional career ==
Sá played his first professional match in 1993, in a Challenger in his hometown of Belo Horizonte, where he lost in the first round at the age of 16. In 1997, he started travelling around South America, reaching his first Challenger semifinal in Quito, losing to Mariano Puerta. In August, he reached his first final, again in his hometown, losing to the Brazilian Roberto Jabali. He also reached the semifinal in Guadalajara, Mexico. In 1997, he played his first Davis Cup match, against Alistair Hunt, from New Zealand, in Florianópolis, for the World Group qualifying round. It was the fifth match of the rubber, with a 5–0 win for Brazil. In October, he played his first ATP-Tour match, in Mexico City, where he reached the quarterfinal.

In 1998, Sá won his first Challenger, on February 23, in Ho Chi Minh City, Vietnam, beating Juan Antonio Marín, from Costa Rica 6–3, 3–6, 6–2. Two weeks later, he won the Salinas Challenger in Ecuador, beating Guillermo Cañas in the final, and on August, he won the Gramado Challenger title over Hideki Kaneko, from Japan. This year saw his first Grand Slam participation, in Wimbledon, where he would reach his best result ever a few years later. He lost to Todd Martin on the first round.

Sá participated in four ATP-Tour tournaments in 1999, reaching the second round in Wimbledon, losing to Karol Kučera, 13th of the world at the time.

In the space of five weeks, he won three Challenger titles: Austin, Texas, beating the American Glenn Weiner, Tulsa, Oklahoma and Dallas, beating Jimy Szymanski in the last two. He had a 13 games winning-streak at the time.

At the beginning of 2000, he reached the final in Waikoloa Challenger and his first ATP semifinal in Memphis, where he lost to eventual winner Swedish Magnus Larsson. He participated in three Grand Slams: Roland Garros (lost 1st round), Wimbledon (lost 1st round) and US Open (lost 2nd round). Sá was part of the Brazilian Davis Cup team that reached the semifinals, losing to Australia 5–0. Sá played the fourth match against Lleyton Hewitt, 4–6, 1–6.

In 2001, Sá again played in three Grand Slams: Australian Open (lost 2nd round), Wimbledon (lost 1st round to Arvind Parmar, who also beat him last year) and US Open (lost 2nd round). He won two Challenger titles: Calabasas, beating Michael Russel, Salvador, Bahia, winning over Brazilian Alexandre Simoni. Sá also reached the Hong Kong ATP semifinal, losing to the German Rainer Schüttler.

Sá's best results were in 2002. Without winning a single title, he reached his career-best ranking, 55, after three excellent ATP results. He participated in all four Grand Slams with a quarterfinal appearance at Wimbledon. He beat Antony Dupuis, Stefan Koubek, compatriot Flávio Saretta and Spain's Feliciano López, but lost in four sets in a three-hour and ten-minute match to home hero Tim Henman, 6–3, 5–7, 6–4, 6–3. Sá won a career-record amount of $102,198. The following month, he reached the Amersfoort quarterfinal and the Kitzbühel third round, allowing Sá get to 55th place in the rankings.

Sá had a terrible 2003. With 13 first-round defeats on a row, he his first win was at the grass of Queen's, beating Belgium's Gilles Elseneer, but losing at the second round. Sá plummeted on the rankings after a horrible losing streak and only a second round in Wimbledon, failing to retain his points. He dropped to 138th after the British Grand Slam.

2004 was a fine year for Sá, winning two challengers, in São Paulo and College Station. He also reached the Covington final. In 2005, Sá won the Challenger of Campos do Jordão and reached the final in Dallas, along with two other semifinals. In 2006, he reached two Challenger finals in Bogotá and Belo Horizonte, finishing the year with a ranking of 179, as the fifth Brazilian.

In 2007, partnering compatriot Marcelo Melo, he reached the men's doubles' Wimbledon semifinals after beating Julien Benneteau and Nicolas Mahut in five sets, 6–7, 6–3, 7–6, 2–6, 6–3. They then beat Paul Hanley and Kevin Ullyett in a second round Wimbledon match, which, at 5 hours and 58 minutes and a fifth set of over three hours, is the second longest ever at Wimbledon. The final score was 7–5, 6–7, 6–4, 6–7, 28–26. Sá and Melo then beat Christopher Kas and Alexander Peya in the third round in another five-set marathon, winning 6–4, 6–7, 7–6, 6–7, 6–4, this one lasting only 3h36. After this, Sá continued success with a 6–4, 6–3, 6–4 victory over seeded Mark Knowles and Daniel Nestor. The team then finally lost 6–7, 4–6, 4–6 to eventual champions Arnaud Clément and Michaël Llodra.

Discarding the 2002 Wimbledon quarterfinal, Sá reached his best results on doubles. With 21 Challenger and six ATP-Tour titles, along with 11 Challenger and nine ATP-Tour finals, Sá is considered one of the best Brazilian doubles player of all time, reaching the respectable 17th place in the ranking. Partnering with Brazilian Flávio Saretta, he reached the quarterfinals at the 2004 Australian Open and with Paraguayan Ramón Delgado, a third round at the 2006 Wimbledon. Representing Brazil, he won the gold medal at the 1999 Pan American Games, in Winnipeg, partnering with Paulo Taicher, besting the Mexican couple Marco Osorio and Óscar Ortiz, 7–6, 6–2. In singles, he lost in the third round to David Nalbandian.

In 2004, Sá participated at the 2004 Summer Olympics in Athens, with Flávio Saretta, at the doubles tournament. They beat the Spanish duo Carlos Moyà/Rafael Nadal in the first round 7–6, 6–1, losing to Zimbabwe's Wayne Black and Kevin Ullyett, 3–6, 4–6.

Sá was the second last Brazilian to secure his place at the 2004 Olympics, Sá only participated at the Games because another team gave up their spot.

Sá played 17 Davis Cup matches, in 12 ties. He won ten matches and lost seven. In doubles, he has an impressive record of seven wins and three losses. He was part of the 2000 Brazilian team that reached the World Group Semifinals.

Sá retired from professional tennis in 2018. He played his last doubles match with compatriot Thomaz Bellucci at 2018 Brasil Open.

== ATP career finals ==
=== Doubles: 30 (11 titles, 19 runner-ups) ===
Legend Grand Slam tournaments (0–0) ATP World Tour Masters 1000 (0–0) ATP World Tour 500 Series (0–1) ATP World Tour 250 Series (11–18)	Finals by surface Hard (3–5) Clay (7–9) Grass (1–5)	Finals by setting Outdoor (10–17) Indoor (1–2)

Result	W–L	Date	Tournament	Tier	Surface	Partner	Opponents	Score
Loss	0–1	Feb 1998	Pacific Coast Championships, United States	World Series	Hard (i)	(Brazil) Nelson Aerts	(Australia) Mark Woodforde (Australia) Todd Woodbridge	1–6, 5–7
Loss	0–2	Feb 2001	Bogota Open, Colombia	International	Clay	(Argentina) Martín Rodríguez	(Argentina) Mariano Hood (Argentina) Sebastián Prieto	6–2, 6–4
Loss	0–3	Jul 2001	Hall of Fame Tennis Championships, United States	International	Grass	(United States) Glenn Weiner	(United States) Bob Bryan (United States) Mike Bryan	6–3, 7–5
Win	1–3	Sep 2001	Hong Kong Open, China	International	Hard	(Germany) Karsten Braasch	(Czech Republic) Petr Luxa (Czech Republic) Radek Štěpánek	6–0, 7–5
Loss	1–4	Jul 2002	Dutch Open, Netherlands	International	Clay	(Brazil) Alexandre Simoni	(South Africa) Jeff Coetzee (South Africa) Chris Haggard	7–6^{(7–1)}, 6–3
Loss	1–5	Sep 2002	Brasil Open, Brazil	International	Hard	(Brazil) Gustavo Kuerten	(United States) Scott Humphries (The Bahamas) Mark Merklein	6–3, 7–6^{(7–1)}
Loss	1–6	Jul 2003	Dutch Open, Netherlands (2)	International	Clay	(South Africa) Chris Haggard	(United States) Devin Bowen (Australia) Ashley Fisher	6–0, 6–4
Win	2–6	Apr 2007	Estoril Open, Portugal	International	Clay	(Brazil) Marcelo Melo	(Argentina) Martín García (Argentina) Sebastián Prieto	3–6, 6–2, [10–6]
Win	3–6	Feb 2008	Brasil Open	International	Clay	(Brazil) Marcelo Melo	(Spain) Albert Montañés (Spain) Santiago Ventura	4–6, 6–2, [10–7]
Win	4–6	May 2008	Hypo Group Tennis International, Austria	International	Clay	(Brazil) Marcelo Melo	(Austria) Julian Knowle (Austria) Jürgen Melzer	7–5, 6–7^{(3–7)}, [13–11]
Loss	4–7	Jun 2008	Queen's Club Championships, United Kingdom	International	Grass	(Brazil) Marcelo Melo	(Canada) Daniel Nestor (Serbia) Nenad Zimonjić	4–6, 6–7^{(3–7)}
Win	5–7	Aug 2008	New Haven Open, United States	International	Hard	(Brazil) Marcelo Melo	(India) Mahesh Bhupathi (The Bahamas) Mark Knowles	7–5, 6–2
Loss	5–8	Mar 2009	Delray Beach Open, United States	250 Series	Hard	(Brazil) Marcelo Melo	(United States) Bob Bryan (United States) Mike Bryan	4–6, 4–6
Win	6–8	May 2009	Austrian Open Kitzbühel, Austria	250 Series	Clay	(Brazil) Marcelo Melo	(Romania) Andrei Pavel (Romania) Horia Tecău	6–7^{(9–11)}, 6–2, [10–7]
Loss	6–9	Jun 2009	Queen's Club Championships, United Kingdom (2)	250 Series	Grass	(Brazil) Marcelo Melo	(South Africa) Wesley Moodie (Russia) Mikhail Youzhny	6–4, 4–6, [10–6]
Loss	6–10	Feb 2011	Buenos Aires Open, Argentina	250 Series	Clay	(Brazil) Franco Ferreiro	(Austria) Oliver Marach (Argentina) Leonardo Mayer	7–6^{(8–6)}, 6–3
Loss	6–11	Aug 2011	Austrian Open Kitzbühel, Austria	250 Series	Clay	(Brazil) Franco Ferreiro	(Italy) Daniele Bracciali (Mexico) Santiago González	6–7^{(1–7)}, 6–4, [9–11]
Win	7–11	Sep 2011	Moselle Open, France	250 Series	Hard (i)	(United Kingdom) Jamie Murray	(Czech Republic) Lukáš Dlouhý (Brazil) Marcelo Melo	6–4, 7–6^{(9–7)}
Loss	7–12	Feb 2012	Brasil Open (2)	250 Series	Clay (i)	(Slovakia) Michal Mertiňák	(United States) Eric Butorac (Brazil) Bruno Soares	6–3, 4–6, [8–10]
Loss	7–13	Feb 2012	Buenos Aires Open, Argentina (2)	250 Series	Clay	(Slovakia) Michal Mertiňák	(Spain) David Marrero (Spain) Fernando Verdasco	4–6, 4–6
Loss	7–14	Mar 2012	Delray Beach Open, United States (2)	250 Series	Hard	(Slovakia) Michal Mertiňák	(United Kingdom) Colin Fleming (United Kingdom) Ross Hutchins	6–2, 6–7^{(5–7)}, [13–15]
Loss	7–15	Jul 2012	Stuttgart Open, Germany	250 Series	Clay	(Slovakia) Michal Mertiňák	(France) Jérémy Chardy (Poland) Łukasz Kubot	1–6, 3–6
Win	8–15	Mar 2015	Buenos Aires Open, Argentina	250 Series	Clay	(Finland) Jarkko Nieminen	(Spain) Pablo Andújar (Austria) Oliver Marach	4–6, 6–4, [10–7]
Win	9–15	Jun 2015	Nottingham Open, United Kingdom	250 Series	Grass	(Australia) Chris Guccione	(Uruguay) Pablo Cuevas (Spain) David Marrero	6–2, 7–5
Win	10–15	Jul 2015	Umag Open, Croatia	250 Series	Clay	(Argentina) Máximo González	(Poland) Mariusz Fyrstenberg (Mexico) Santiago González	4–6, 6–3, [10–5]
Loss	10–16	Oct 2015	Shenzhen Open, China	250 Series	Hard	(Australia) Chris Guccione	(Israel) Jonathan Erlich (United Kingdom) Colin Fleming	1–6, 7–6^{(7–3)}, [6–10]
Loss	10–17	Apr 2016	Romanian Open	250 Series	Clay	(Australia) Chris Guccione	(Romania) Florin Mergea (Romania) Horia Tecău	5–7, 4–6
Loss	10–18	Jun 2016	Queen's Club Championships, United Kingdom	500 Series	Grass	(Australia) Chris Guccione	(France) Pierre-Hugues Herbert (France) Nicolas Mahut	3–6, 6–7^{(5–7)}
Win	11–18	Mar 2017	Brasil Open	250 Series	Clay	(Brazil) Rogério Dutra Silva	(New Zealand) Marcus Daniell (Brazil) Marcelo Demoliner	7–6^{(7–5)}, 5–7, [10–7]
Loss	11–19	Jun 2017	Eastbourne International, United Kingdom	250 Series	Grass	(India) Rohan Bopanna	(United States) Bob Bryan (United States) Mike Bryan	7–6^{(7–4)}, 4–6, [3–10]

== Challenger Tour singles titles (11) ==
- 1998: Ho Chi Minh City, Vietnam – defeated Juan Antonio Marín 6–3, 3–6, 6–2
- 1998: Salinas, Ecuador – def. Guillermo Cañas 7–5, 5–7, 6–4
- 1998: Gramado, Brazil – def. Hideki Kaneko 6–7, 6–1, 6–4
- 1999: Austin, USA – def. Glenn Weiner 7–5, 6–2
- 1999: Tulsa, USA – def. Jimy Szymanski 6–2, 7–6^{(4)}
- 1999: Dallas, USA – def. Jimy Szymanski 7–5, 4–6, 6–4
- 2001: Calabasas, USA – def. Michael Russell 4–6, 6–2, 6–4
- 2001: Salvador, Brazil – def. Alexandre Simoni 6–3, 6–2
- 2004: São Paulo, Brazil – def. Jacob Adaktusson 6–4, 6–0
- 2004: College Station, USA – def. Brian Vahaly 6–3, 6–0
- 2005: Campos do Jordão, Brazil – def. Juan Martín del Potro 6–4, 6–4

== Grand Slam performance timelines ==
Key
W	F	SF	QF	#R	RR	Q#	DNQ	A	NH

(W) winner; (F) finalist; (SF) semifinalist; (QF) quarterfinalist; (#R) rounds 4, 3, 2, 1; (RR) round-robin stage; (Q#) qualification round; (DNQ) did not qualify; (A) absent; (NH) not held; (SR) strike rate (events won / competed); (W–L) win–loss record.

=== Singles ===
Tournament	1998	1999	2000	2001	2002	2003	2004	W–L
Australian Open	A	A	A	2R	1R	1R	A	1–3
French Open	A	A	1R	A	1R	1R	A	0–3
Wimbledon	1R	2R	1R	1R	QF	2R	1R	6–7
US Open	A	A	2R	2R	1R	A	A	2–3
Win–loss	0–1	1–1	1–3	2–3	4–4	1–3	0–1	9–16

=== Doubles ===
Tournament	1997	1998	1999	2000	2001	2002	2003	2004	2005	2006	2007	2008	2009	2010	2011	2012	2013	2014	2015	2016	2017	W–L
Australian Open	A	1R	1R	A	A	1R	1R	QF	1R	A	A	1R	2R	1R	1R	2R	2R	1R	1R	1R	1R	7–16
French Open	A	1R	A	A	A	3R	1R	1R	1R	A	2R	2R	1R	3R	1R	1R	3R	3R	3R	3R	2R	15–16
Wimbledon	A	1R	A	A	A	1R	3R	2R	1R	3R	SF	3R	2R	1R	1R	2R	1R	3R	1R	1R	1R	16–16
US Open	1R	1R	1R	A	1R	1R	1R	1R	A	A	QF	3R	2R	1R	1R	1R	2R	2R	1R	QF	1R	13–18
Win–loss	0–1	0–4	0–2	0–0	0–1	2–4	2–4	5–4	0–3	2–1	10–3	5–4	3–4	2–4	0–4	2–4	4–4	5–4	2–4	6–4	1–4	51–66
