= Ramón Delgado =

Paraguayan tennis player

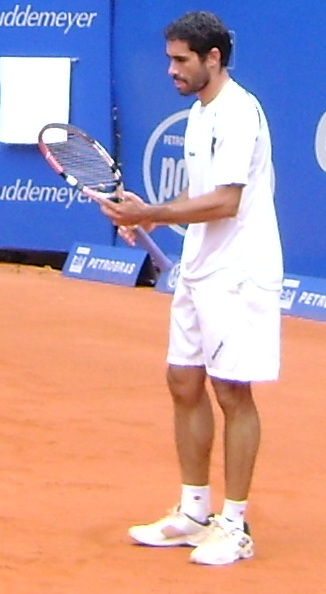
- Country (sports): Paraguay
- Residence: Asunción, Paraguay
- Born: November 14, 1976 (age 49) Asunción, Paraguay
- Height: 1.85 m (6 ft 1 in)
- Turned pro: 1995
- Retired: 2011
- Plays: Right-handed (two-handed backhand)
- Prize money: $1,385,410

Singles
- Career record: 103–108
- Career titles: 0
- Highest ranking: No. 52 (26 April 1999)

Grand Slam singles results
- Australian Open: 2R (2002)
- French Open: 4R (1998)
- Wimbledon: 1R (1998, 1999, 2002, 2004, 2010)
- US Open: 3R (2001, 2002)

Doubles
- Career record: 19–28
- Career titles: 0
- Highest ranking: No. 91 (18 June 2007)

Grand Slam doubles results
- Wimbledon: 3R (2006)
- Last updated on: 10 June 2021.

Ramón Delgado (Spanish pronunciation: [raˈmon delˈɣaðo]; born 14 November 1976) is a Paraguayan retired tennis player and current tennis coach. He turned professional in 1995 and achieved a career-high singles ranking of world No. 52 in April 1999. He reached the final at Bogotá in 1998 and the fourth round of the 1998 French Open, defeating Pete Sampras in the second round.

== Tennis career ==
=== 2002 ===
In April 2002, Delgado lost in the first round of the Mallorca Open to a 15-year-old Rafael Nadal in Nadal's first ever ATP match. Nadal would go on to win 22 major titles as of the 2022 French Open.

=== 2006 ===
Delgado nearly qualified for the 2006 Wimbledon Championships, but was defeated in the third and final qualifying round by Roko Karanušić.

=== 2010 ===
In October 2010, Delgado defeated Chilean Nicolás Massú in three sets (7–5, 2–6, 6–3) to advance and face Spanish player Pere Riba at the last 16 stage of the Copa Petrobras.

=== 2011 ===
He announced his retirement from tennis in May 2011.

== Coaching career ==
In 2011, Delgado began coaching tennis.

Delgado was captain of Paraguay's 2015 Fed Cup team, which was made up of Verónica Cepede Royg, Sarita Giménez, Camila Giangreco and Montserrat González.

== ATP Tour career finals ==
=== Singles: 1 (1 runner-up) ===
Legend Grand Slam tournaments (0–0) ATP World Tour Finals (0–0) ATP World Tour Masters Series (0–0) ATP World Tour Championship Series (0–0) ATP World Tour World Series (0–1)	Finals by surface Hard (0–0) Clay (0–1) Grass (0–0)	Finals by setting Outdoor (0–1) Indoor (0–0)

Result	W–L	Date	Tournament	Tier	Surface	Opponent	Score
Loss	0–1	Nov 1998	Bogotá, Colombia	World Series	Clay	(Argentina) Mariano Zabaleta	4–6, 4–6

== ATP Challenger and ITF Futures finals ==
=== Singles: 15 (9–6) ===
Legend ATP Challenger (9–6) ITF Futures (0–0)	Finals by surface Hard (4–2) Clay (5–4) Grass (0–0) Carpet (0–0)

Result	W–L	Date	Tournament	Tier	Surface	Opponent	Score
Win	1-0	Jul 1997	Cali, Colombia	Challenger	Clay	(Argentina) Sebastián Prieto	6–3, 1–6, 7–6
Loss	1-1	Jul 1997	Quito, Ecuador	Challenger	Clay	(Argentina) Mariano Puerta	1-6, 5-7
Loss	1-2	May 2001	Rocky Mount, United States	Challenger	Clay	(Czech Republic) Jan Vacek	6–7^{(0–7)}, 5–7
Win	2-2	Jun 2001	Tallahassee, United States	Challenger	Hard	(United States) Justin Gimelstob	7–5, 6–3
Loss	2-3	Jul 2001	Campinas, Brazil	Challenger	Clay	(Italy) Alessio di Mauro	2-6, 4-6
Win	3-3	Jul 2001	Campos Do Jordão, Brazil	Challenger	Hard	(Brazil) Daniel Melo	7–6^{(7–3)}, 6–2
Loss	3-4	Nov 2004	Champaign-Urbana, United States	Challenger	Hard	(United States) Justin Gimelstob	4-6, 4-6
Win	4-4	Nov 2004	Bogotá, Colombia	Challenger	Clay	(Argentina) Mariano Puerta	6–4, 7–5
Win	5-4	Sep 2005	Lubbock, United States	Challenger	Hard	(United States) Bobby Reynolds	2–6, 7–6^{(7–5)}, 6–3
Loss	5-5	Nov 2005	Nashville, United States	Challenger	Hard	(United States) Bobby Reynolds	4–6, 4–6
Win	6-5	Apr 2006	Mexico City, Mexico	Challenger	Clay	(Colombia) Alejandro Falla	6–3, 4–6, 6–4
Win	7-5	Apr 2007	Mexico City, Mexico	Challenger	Clay	(Chile) Adrián García	6–3, 6–3
Win	8-5	Oct 2009	Asunción, Paraguay	Challenger	Clay	(Spain) Daniel Gimeno Traver	7–6^{(7–2)}, 1–6, 6–3
Win	9-5	Nov 2009	Puebla, Mexico	Challenger	Hard	(Germany) Andre Begemann	6–3, 6–4
Loss	9-6	Oct 2010	Asunción, Paraguay	Challenger	Clay	(Portugal) Rui Machado	2–6, 6–3, 5–7

=== Doubles: 17 (6–11) ===
Legend ATP Challenger (6–11) ITF Futures (0–0)	Finals by surface Hard (3–2) Clay (3–9) Grass (0–0) Carpet (0–0)

Result	W–L	Date	Tournament	Tier	Surface	Partner	Opponents	Score
Loss	0-1	Dec 1996	Santiago, Chile	Challenger	Clay	(Peru) Alejandro Aramburu Acuna	(Argentina) Gastón Etlis (Argentina) Martín Rodríguez	4-6, 4-6
Loss	0-2	Jul 1997	Quito, Ecuador	Challenger	Clay	(Argentina) Martin Garcia	(Mexico) Bernardo Martínez (Mexico) Marco Osorio	4-6, 4-6
Loss	0-3	May 2001	Birmingham, United States	Challenger	Clay	(Argentina) Ignacio Hirigoyen	(United States) James Blake (The Bahamas) Mark Merklein	5-7, 1-6
Loss	0-4	Apr 2002	Paget, Bermuda	Challenger	Clay	(Brazil) Alexandre Simoni	(Switzerland) George Bastl (South Africa) Neville Godwin	5-7, 3-6
Win	1-4	Oct 2003	Torrance, United States	Challenger	Hard	(Brazil) André Sá	(United States) Diego Ayala (United States) Robert Kendrick	6–3, 6–4
Win	2-4	Jan 2004	São Paulo, Brazil	Challenger	Hard	(Brazil) André Sá	(Brazil) Marcelo Melo (Brazil) Franco Ferreiro	7–5, 7–6^{(7–5)}
Win	3-4	Jan 2005	La Serena, Chile	Challenger	Clay	(Italy) Enzo Artoni	(Germany) Tomas Behrend (Brazil) Marcos Daniel	7–6^{(7–2)}, 6–4
Loss	3-5	Feb 2005	Dallas, United States	Challenger	Hard	(Brazil) André Sá	(Ecuador) Giovanni Lapentti (South Africa) Rik de Voest	4–6, 4–6
Win	4-5	Nov 2005	Boston, United States	Challenger	Hard	(Brazil) André Sá	(India) Harsh Mankad (United States) Jeremy Wurtzman	6–3, 6–2
Loss	4-6	Apr 2006	Bogotá, Colombia	Challenger	Clay	(Brazil) André Sá	(United States) Chris Drake (United States) Eric Butorac	walkover
Loss	4-7	May 2006	Prague, Czech Republic	Challenger	Clay	(Argentina) Sergio Roitman	(Czech Republic) Petr Pála (Czech Republic) David Škoch	0–6, 0–6
Loss	4-8	Apr 2007	Mexico City, Mexico	Challenger	Clay	(Brazil) André Sá	(Brazil) Marcelo Melo (Argentina) Horacio Zeballos	4–6, 2–6
Win	5-8	Jun 2007	Prostějov, Czech Republic	Challenger	Clay	(Argentina) Juan Pablo Guzmán	(Czech Republic) Tomáš Cibulec (Czech Republic) Leoš Friedl	7–6^{(10–8)}, 6–1
Win	6-8	Mar 2008	Bogotá, Colombia	Challenger	Clay	(Argentina) Brian Dabul	(Brazil) Thomaz Bellucci (Brazil) Bruno Soares	7–6^{(7–5)}, 6–4
Loss	6-9	Nov 2008	Lima, Peru	Challenger	Clay	(Brazil) Júlio Silva	(Peru) Luis Horna (Argentina) Sebastián Prieto	3–6, 3–6
Loss	6-10	Aug 2009	Vancouver, Canada	Challenger	Hard	(United States) Kaes Van't Hof	(South Africa) Kevin Anderson (South Africa) Rik de Voest	4–6, 4–6
Loss	6-11	Apr 2010	Curitiba, Brazil	Challenger	Clay	(Brazil) André Sá	(Germany) Dominik Meffert (Portugal) Leonardo Tavares	6–3, 2–6, [4–10]

== Performance timeline ==
Key
W	F	SF	QF	#R	RR	Q#	DNQ	A	NH

(W) winner; (F) finalist; (SF) semifinalist; (QF) quarterfinalist; (#R) rounds 4, 3, 2, 1; (RR) round-robin stage; (Q#) qualification round; (DNQ) did not qualify; (A) absent; (NH) not held; (SR) strike rate (events won / competed); (W–L) win–loss record.

=== Singles ===
Tournament	1996	1997	1998	1999	2000	2001	2002	2003	2004	2005	2006	2007	2008	2009	2010	SR	W–L	Win %
Grand Slam tournaments
Australian Open	A	A	A	1R	A	A	2R	A	Q1	A	Q1	A	A	A	Q2	0 / 2	1–2	33%
French Open	A	2R	4R	1R	Q1	A	1R	A	Q1	Q3	Q1	Q2	A	A	Q2	0 / 4	4–4	50%
Wimbledon	A	Q2	1R	1R	A	Q1	1R	A	1R	Q2	Q3	Q1	A	A	1R	0 / 5	0–5	0%
US Open	1R	A	1R	1R	A	3R	3R	2R	Q1	Q2	1R	A	A	A	Q2	0 / 7	5–7	42%
Win–loss	0–1	1–1	3–3	0–4	0–0	2–1	3–4	1–1	0–1	0–0	0–1	0–0	0–0	0–0	0–1	0 / 18	10–18	36%
ATP Tour Masters 1000
Indian Wells Masters	A	A	A	1R	A	A	A	A	A	1R	Q1	Q2	A	A	2R	0 / 3	1–3	25%
Miami Open	A	A	2R	3R	A	A	1R	A	Q2	A	Q1	Q2	A	A	Q2	0 / 3	3–3	50%
Monte-Carlo Masters	A	A	A	2R	A	A	A	A	A	A	A	A	A	A	A	0 / 1	1–1	50%
Hamburg	A	A	A	1R	A	A	A	A	A	A	A	A	A	NMS		0 / 1	0–1	0%
Rome Masters	A	A	A	1R	A	A	Q2	A	A	A	A	A	A	A	A	0 / 1	0–1	0%
Canada Masters	A	A	2R	3R	A	A	A	2R	A	A	A	A	A	A	Q1	0 / 3	4–3	57%
Cincinnati Masters	A	A	1R	1R	A	A	1R	Q1	A	A	A	A	A	A	Q1	0 / 3	0–3	0%
Paris Masters	A	A	A	A	A	Q2	A	A	A	A	A	A	A	A	A	0 / 0	0–0	–
Win–loss	0–0	0–0	2–3	5–7	0–0	0–0	0–2	1–1	0–0	0–1	0–0	0–0	0–0	0–0	1–1	0 / 15	9–15	38%
