= Bancolombia Open =

Defunct tennis tournament
- Event name: Bogotá
- Founded: 1994
- Abolished: 2010
- Editions: 14
- Location: Bogotá, Colombia
- Venue: Club Campestre El Rancho (1994–96); Centro de Alto Rendimiento (1997–98, 2000–01)
- Category: ATP Tour (1994–98, 2000–01); ATP Challenger Tour (2004–10)
- Surface: Clay (red)
- Draw: 32S/32Q/16D

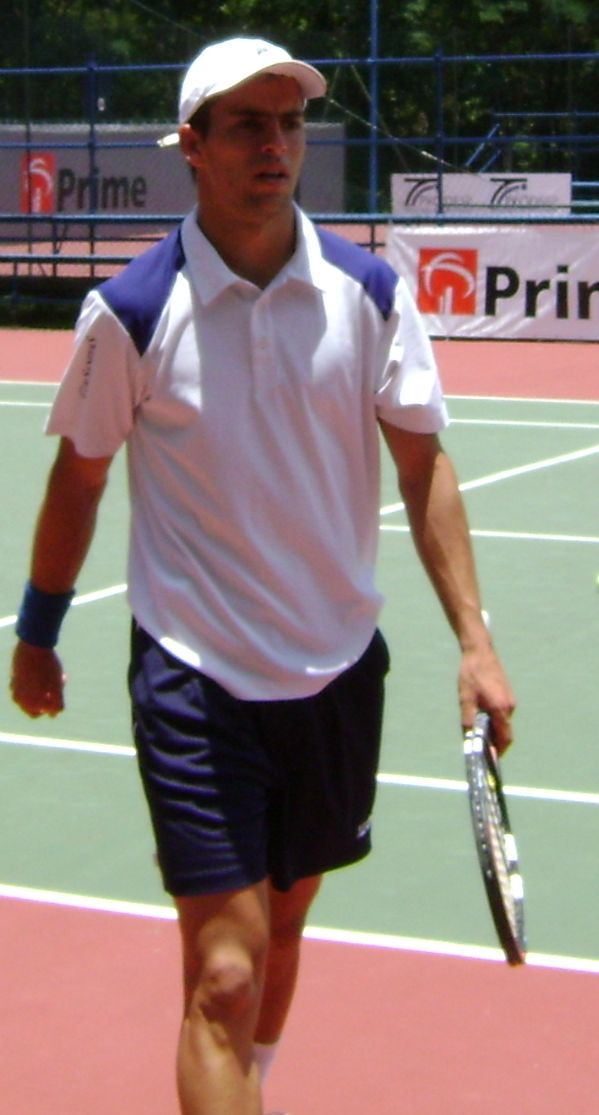
2007 winner Santiago Giraldo was the second Colombian to win the singles after 2004, 2006 champion Alejandro Falla

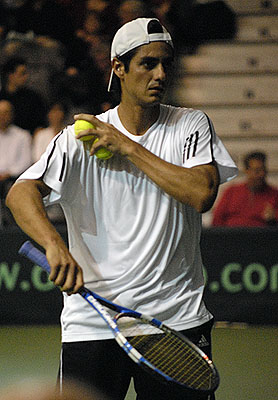
Ecuadorian Nicolás Lapentti appeared in three straight singles finals from 1995 to 1997, winning the first of them

The Bancolombia Open was a professional tennis tournament played on outdoor red clay courts. It was part of the Association of Tennis Professionals (ATP) Challenger Tour. It was held annually in Bogotá, Colombia, from 1994 (as an ATP World Series tournament from 1994 to 1997, as an ATP International Series tournament from 1998 to 2001, and as a Challenger from 2004 to 2010).

David Rikl and Sebastián Prieto have each won the most doubles titles, with two apiece, and so has Horacio Zeballos in singles titles. The Argentinian was also the only player to win in both singles and doubles in the same year.

== Past finals ==
=== Singles ===
Year	Champion	Runner-up	Score
1994	(Venezuela) Nicolás Pereira	(Colombia) Mauricio Hadad	6–3, 3–6, 6–4
1995	(Ecuador) Nicolás Lapentti	(Colombia) Miguel Tobón	2–6, 6–1, 6–4
1996	(Austria) Thomas Muster	(Ecuador) Nicolás Lapentti	6–7^{(6–8)}, 6–2, 6–3
1997	(Spain) Francisco Clavet	(Ecuador) Nicolás Lapentti	6–3, 6–3
1998	(Argentina) Mariano Zabaleta	(Paraguay) Ramón Delgado	6–4, 6–4
1999	Not held		
2000	(Argentina) Mariano Puerta	(Morocco) Younes El Aynaoui	6–4, 7–6^{(7–5)}
2001	(Spain) Fernando Vicente	(Argentina) Juan Ignacio Chela	6–4, 7–6^{(8–6)}
2002	Not held		
2003	Not held		
2004	(Colombia) Alejandro Falla (1)	(Chile) Adrián García	4–6, 6–1, 6–2
2005	(Chile) Paul Capdeville	(Colombia) Pablo González	6–3, 6–4
2006	(Colombia) Alejandro Falla (2)	(Brazil) André Sá	6–4, 6–2
2007	(Colombia) Santiago Giraldo	(Brazil) Flávio Saretta	7–6^{(7–4)}, 6–2
2008	(Brazil) Marcos Daniel	(Spain) Iván Navarro	6–3, 1–6, 6–3
2009	(Argentina) Horacio Zeballos	(Mexico) Santiago González	7–6^{(7–3)}, 6–0
2010	(Brazil) João Souza	(Colombia) Alejandro Falla	4–6, 6–4, 6–1

=== Doubles ===
Year	Champions	Runners-up	Score
1994	(The Bahamas) Mark Knowles (Canada) Daniel Nestor	(United States) Luke Jensen (United States) Murphy Jensen	6–4, 7–6
1995	(Czech Republic) Jiří Novák (Czech Republic) David Rikl (1)	(United States) Steve Campbell (United States) MaliVai Washington	7–6, 6–2
1996	(Venezuela) Nicolás Pereira (Czech Republic) David Rikl (2)	(Ecuador) Pablo Campana (Ecuador) Nicolás Lapentti	6–3, 7–6
1997	(Argentina) Luis Lobo (Brazil) Fernando Meligeni	(Morocco) Karim Alami (Venezuela) Maurice Ruah	6–1, 6–3
1998	(Argentina) Diego del Río (Argentina) Mariano Puerta	(Hungary) Gábor Köves (Philippines) Eric Taino	6–7, 6–3, 6–2
1999	Not Held		
2000	(Argentina) Pablo Albano (Argentina) Lucas Arnold Ker	(Spain) Juan Balcells (Colombia) Mauricio Hadad	7–6^{(7–4)}, 1–6, 6–2
2001	(Argentina) Mariano Hood (Argentina) Sebastián Prieto (1)	(Argentina) Martín Rodríguez (Brazil) André Sá	6–2, 6–4
2002	Not held		
2003	Not held		
2004	(Colombia) Sebastián Quintero (Colombia) Óscar Rodríguez	(Argentina) Gustavo Marcaccio (Argentina) Diego Veronelli	6–3, 6–4
2005	(Brazil) Marcos Daniel (Mexico) Santiago González	(United States) Goran Dragicevic (United States) Mirko Pehar	7–6^{(7–4)}, 6–3
2006	(United States) Eric Butorac (United States) Chris Drake	(Paraguay) Ramón Delgado (Brazil) André Sá	W/O
2007	(Argentina) Martín García (Argentina) Diego Hartfield	(Portugal) Frederico Gil (Belgium) Dick Norman	6–4, 3–6, [10–5]
2008	(Argentina) Brian Dabul (Paraguay) Ramón Delgado	(Brazil) Thomaz Bellucci (Brazil) Bruno Soares	7–6^{(7–5)}, 6–4
2009	(Argentina) Sebastián Prieto (2) (Argentina) Horacio Zeballos	(Austria) Alexander Peya (Spain) Fernando Vicente	4–6, 6–1, [11–9]
2010	(Brazil) Franco Ferreiro (Mexico) Santiago González	(Germany) Dominik Meffert (Austria) Philipp Oswald	6–3, 5–7, [10–7]
