= 2015 Uruguay Open – Doubles =

Doubles
- 2015 Uruguay Open

Final
- Champion: (Slovakia) Andrej Martin; (Chile) Hans Podlipnik Castillo
- Runner-up: (Brazil) Marcelo Demoliner; (Portugal) Gastão Elias
- Score: 6–4, 3–6, [10–6]

Events
Singles	Doubles
← 2014 ·	Uruguay Open	· 2016 →

Andrej Martin and Hans Podlipnik Castillo won the title, defeating Marcelo Demoliner and Gastão Elias 6–4, 3–6, [10–6]

== Seeds ==
1. (Slovakia) Andrej Martin / (Chile) Hans Podlipnik (champions)
2. (Chile) Julio Peralta / (Argentina) Horacio Zeballos (semifinals)
3. (Peru) Sergio Galdós / (Argentina) Máximo González (semifinals)
4. (Brazil) Marcelo Demoliner / (Portugal) Gastão Elias (final)

== Draw ==
=== Key ===
- Q = Qualifier
- WC = Wild card
- LL = Lucky loser
- Alt = Alternate
- SE = Special exempt
- PR = Protected ranking
- ITF = ITF entry
- JE = Junior exempt
- w/o = Walkover
- r = Retired
- d = Defaulted
- SR = Special ranking

=== Draw ===
First round

Quarterfinals

Semifinals

Final

1
- (Slovakia) A Martin
- (Chile) H Podlipnik
6
6^{8}
[10]

- (Argentina) F Argüello
- (Argentina) T Lipovšek Puches
3
7^{10}
[7]

1
- (Slovakia) A Martin
- (Chile) H Podlipnik
6
6

WC
- (Uruguay) Gonzalo Bancalari
- (Uruguay) N Xiviller
5
2

- (Austria) M Linzer
- (United Kingdom) A Ward
1
4

- (Austria) M Linzer
- (United Kingdom) A Ward
7
6

1
- (Slovakia) A Martin
- (Chile) H Podlipnik
6
6

3
- (Peru) S Galdós
- (Argentina) M González
6
6

3
- (Peru) S Galdós
- (Argentina) M González
4
2

- (Spain) Í Cervantes
- (Netherlands) M Vervoort
2
4

3
- (Peru) S Galdós
- (Argentina) M González
6
6

WC
- (Argentina) L Arnold Ker
- (Uruguay) M Felder
6
6

WC
- (Argentina) L Arnold Ker
- (Uruguay) M Felder
4
4

- (Brazil) A Ghem
- (Argentina) JI Londero
2
3

1
- (Slovakia) A Martin
- (Chile) H Podlipnik
6
3
[10]

(Argentina) F Coria
(Argentina) Juan Ignacio Galarza
6
6

4
- (Brazil) M Demoliner
- (Portugal) G Elias
4
6
[6]

WC
- (Uruguay) R Arus
- (Uruguay) S Maresca
3
2

(Argentina) F Coria
(Argentina) JI Galarza
6
1
[3]

- (Uruguay) M Cuevas
- (Uruguay) P Cuevas
3
7^{7}
[4]

4
- (Brazil) M Demoliner
- (Portugal) G Elias
1
6
[10]

4
- (Brazil) M Demoliner
- (Portugal) G Elias
6
6^{3}
[10]

4
- (Brazil) M Demoliner
- (Portugal) G Elias
6
6

- (Brazil) G Clezar
- (Brazil) F Neis
6
3
[3]

2
- (Chile) J Peralta
- (Argentina) H Zeballos
4
3

- (Brazil) O Luz
- (Brazil) M Zormann
1
6
[10]

- (Brazil) O Luz
- (Brazil) M Zormann
6^{5}
7
[7]

- (Argentina) A Collarini
- (Argentina) A Molteni
1
2

2
- (Chile) J Peralta
- (Argentina) H Zeballos
7^{7}
5
[10]

2
- (Chile) J Peralta
- (Argentina) H Zeballos
6
6
