= 2010 Copa Petrobras Montevideo – Doubles =

Doubles
- 2010 Copa Petrobras Montevideo

Final
- Champions: (Argentina) Carlos Berlocq (Argentina) Brian Dabul
- Runners-up: (Argentina) Máximo González (Argentina) Sebastián Prieto
- Score: 7–5, 6–3

Events
Singles	Doubles
← 2009 ·	Copa Petrobras Montevideo	· 2011 →

Juan Pablo Brzezicki and David Marrero were the defending champions, but only Argentinian player tried to defend his title.
He partnered with Santiago Ventura, but they lost to Carlos Berlocq and Brian Dabul in the semifinals.
Berlocq and Dabul went on to win the tournament after defeating Máximo González and Sebastián Prieto 7–5, 6–3 in the final.

== Seeds ==
1. (Argentina) Juan Pablo Brzezicki / (Spain) Santiago Ventura (semifinals)
2. (Argentina) Máximo González / (Argentina) Sebastián Prieto (final)
3. (Portugal) Rui Machado / (Portugal) Leonardo Tavares (first round)
4. (Argentina) Carlos Berlocq / (Argentina) Brian Dabul (champions)

== Draw ==
=== Key ===
- Q = Qualifier
- WC = Wild card
- LL = Lucky loser
- Alt = Alternate
- SE = Special exempt
- PR = Protected ranking
- ITF = ITF entry
- JE = Junior exempt
- w/o = Walkover
- r = Retired
- d = Defaulted
- SR = Special ranking

=== Draw ===
First round
1	(Argentina) JP Brzezicki (Spain) S Ventura	6	6
(Argentina) J-P Amado (Argentina) J-M Valverde	3	3
(Uruguay) M Cuevas (Uruguay) P Cuevas	6	6^{2}	[10]
(Uruguay) M Felder (Chile) N Massú	3	7	[4]
4	(Argentina) C Berlocq (Argentina) B Dabul	6	4	[11]
(Argentina) J-M Aranguren (Argentina) A Fabbri	0	6	[9]
WC	(Uruguay) D Acosta (Uruguay) S Maresca	0	1
(Argentina) A Molteni (Argentina) G Pella	6	6
WC	(Ecuador) D Acosta (Brazil) G Clézar	2	2
(Chile) J Aguilar (Argentina) M Alund	6	6
(Argentina) D Junqueira (Argentina) M Vassallo Argüello	6	6
3	(Portugal) R Machado (Portugal) L Tavares	2	3
(Slovakia) P Červenák (Slovakia) I Klec	6	6
WC	(Uruguay) A Behar (Uruguay) F Sansonetti	2	0
(Argentina) D Cristín (Argentina) F del Bonis	4	1
2	(Argentina) M González (Argentina) S Prieto	6	6

Quarterfinals
1	(Argentina) JP Brzezicki (Spain) S Ventura	6	3	[10]
(Uruguay) M Cuevas (Uruguay) P Cuevas	2	6	[8]
4	(Argentina) C Berlocq (Argentina) B Dabul	6	6
(Argentina) A Molteni (Argentina) G Pella	3	2
(Chile) J Aguilar (Argentina) M Alund	4	6	[10]
(Argentina) D Junqueira (Argentina) M Vassallo Argüello	6	1	[8]
(Slovakia) P Červenák (Slovakia) I Klec	6	6^{4}	[7]
2	(Argentina) M González (Argentina) S Prieto	2	7	[10]

Semifinals
1	(Argentina) JP Brzezicki (Spain) S Ventura	7	2	[8]
4	(Argentina) C Berlocq (Argentina) B Dabul	5	6	[10]
(Chile) J Aguilar (Argentina) M Alund	5	5
2	(Argentina) M González (Argentina) S Prieto	7	7

Final
4	(Argentina) C Berlocq (Argentina) B Dabul	7	6
2	(Argentina) M González (Argentina) S Prieto	5	3
