= 2010 Copa Petrobras Montevideo – Singles =

Singles
- 2010 Copa Petrobras Montevideo

Final
- Champion: (Argentina) Máximo González
- Runner-up: (Uruguay) Pablo Cuevas
- Score: 1–6, 6–3, 6–4

Events
Singles	Doubles
← 2009 ·	Copa Petrobras Montevideo	· 2011 →

Pablo Cuevas was the defending champion. He reached the final, but he lost to Máximo González 6–1, 3–6, 4–6.

== Seeds ==
1. (Uruguay) Pablo Cuevas (final)
2. (Argentina) Brian Dabul (quarterfinals)
3. (Argentina) Carlos Berlocq (quarterfinals)
4. (Portugal) Rui Machado (second round, retired)
5. (Chile) Nicolás Massú (first round)
6. (Spain) Santiago Ventura (first round)
7. (Argentina) Federico Delbonis (quarterfinals)
8. (Argentina) Diego Junqueira (second round)

== Draw ==
=== Key ===
- Q = Qualifier
- WC = Wild card
- LL = Lucky loser
- Alt = Alternate
- SE = Special exempt
- PR = Protected ranking
- ITF = ITF entry
- JE = Junior exempt
- w/o = Walkover
- r = Retired
- d = Defaulted
- SR = Special ranking

=== Finals ===
Semifinals
1	(Uruguay) Pablo Cuevas	4
(Argentina) Martín Vassallo Argüello	2^{r}
(Chile) Jorge Aguilar	6	1	3
(Argentina) Máximo González	4	6	6

Final
1	(Uruguay) Pablo Cuevas	6	3	4
(Argentina) Máximo González	1	6	6

=== Top half ===
First round
1	(Uruguay) P Cuevas	6	6
(Uruguay) M Felder	2	1
(Argentina) M Alund	3	2
(Slovakia) P Červenák	6	6
(Portugal) L Tavares	6	6^{5}	6
Q	(Brazil) R Camilo	3	7	4
Q	(Argentina) A Picco	1	1
7	(Argentina) F del Bonis	6	6
4	(Portugal) R Machado	6	2	6
WC	(Uruguay) M Cuevas	3	6	4
Q	(Argentina) G Durán	4	2
(Argentina) M Vassallo Argüello	6	6
(Slovakia) I Klec	7	6
WC	(Argentina) A Velotti	6^{7}	4
(Argentina) JP Brzezicki	6	6
5	(Chile) N Massú	3	4

Second round
1	(Uruguay) P Cuevas	6	6
(Slovakia) P Červenák	2	1
(Portugal) L Tavares	2	6	3
7	(Argentina) F del Bonis	6	4	6
4	(Portugal) R Machado	2	0^{r}
(Argentina) M Vassallo Argüello	6	1
(Slovakia) I Klec	3	4
(Argentina) JP Brzezicki	6	6

Quarterfinals
1	(Uruguay) P Cuevas	6	6
7	(Argentina) F del Bonis	3	4
(Argentina) M Vassallo Argüello	6	6
(Argentina) JP Brzezicki	3	3

Semifinals
1	(Uruguay) P Cuevas	4
(Argentina) M Vassallo Argüello	2^{r}

=== Bottom half ===
First round
6	(Spain) S Ventura	5	1
(Chile) J Aguilar	7	6
(Argentina) J-M Valverde	7	6
(Argentina) G Pella	6^{3}	2
WC	(Brazil) G Clézar	5	6	4
(Romania) C Gârd	7	3	6
(Argentina) J-P Amado	2	1
3	(Argentina) C Berlocq	6	6
8	(Argentina) D Junqueira	6	6
Q	(Argentina) J Gonzalia	3	2
(Argentina) M González	2	6	6
(Argentina) A Molteni	6	2	1
ALT	(Argentina) F Argüello	6	7
WC	(Uruguay) A Behar	2	6^{4}
(Argentina) J-M Aranguren	2	6^{9}
2	(Argentina) B Dabul	6	7

Second round
(Chile) J Aguilar	6	6
(Argentina) J-M Valverde	1	2
(Romania) C Gârd	1	3
3	(Argentina) C Berlocq	6	6
8	(Argentina) D Junqueira	6	4	2
(Argentina) M González	4	6	6
ALT	(Argentina) F Argüello	3	1
2	(Argentina) B Dabul	6	6

Quarterfinals
(Chile) J Aguilar	4	6	6
3	(Argentina) C Berlocq	6	4	0
(Argentina) M González	6	5	6
2	(Argentina) B Dabul	3	7	3

Semifinals
(Chile) J Aguilar	6	1	3
(Argentina) M González	4	6	6
