= 2013 Uruguay Open – Doubles =

Doubles
- 2013 Uruguay Open

Final
- Champions: (Uruguay) Martín Cuevas (Uruguay) Pablo Cuevas
- Runners-up: (Brazil) André Ghem (Brazil) Rogério Dutra da Silva
- Score: Walkover

Events
Singles	Doubles
← 2012 ·	Uruguay Open	· 2014 →

Nikola Mektić and Antonio Veić were the defending champions but decided not to participate.
Wildcards Martín Cuevas and Pablo Cuevas, won the title despite winning only 1 match in the quarterfinals after a series of withdrawals.

== Seeds ==
1. (Peru) Sergio Galdós / (Argentina) Andrés Molteni (quarterfinals)
2. (Netherlands) Stephan Fransen / (Netherlands) Wesley Koolhof (first round)
3. (Argentina) Guillermo Durán / (Argentina) Máximo González (quarterfinals)
4. (Argentina) Guido Andreozzi / (Argentina) Eduardo Schwank (quarterfinals, withdrew)

== Draw ==
=== Key ===
- Q = Qualifier
- WC = Wild card
- LL = Lucky loser
- Alt = Alternate
- SE = Special exempt
- PR = Protected ranking
- ITF = ITF entry
- JE = Junior exempt
- w/o = Walkover
- r = Retired
- d = Defaulted
- SR = Special ranking

=== Draw ===
First round
1	(Peru) S Galdós (Argentina) A Molteni	6	6
(Uruguay) A Behar (Argentina) M Trungelliti	4	4
(El Salvador) M Arévalo (Croatia) K Mesaroš	w/o
WC	(Uruguay) M Cuevas (Uruguay) P Cuevas
4	(Argentina) G Andreozzi (Argentina) E Schwank
(Chile) P Capdeville (Argentina) DS Schwartzman	w/o
(Argentina) F Argüello (Argentina) R Olivo	2	2
(Argentina) L Mayer (Argentina) A Velotti	6	6
(Brazil) A Ghem (Brazil) R Dutra da Silva	6	6
WC	(Uruguay) S Maresca (Uruguay) Rodrigo Senattore	2	1
WC	(Uruguay) R Arus (Argentina) Stefano di Aloy	0	5
3	(Argentina) G Durán (Argentina) M González	6	7
(Argentina) P Heras (Chile) G Lama	6	3	[6]
(Brazil) G Clezar (Portugal) G Elias	4	6	[10]
(Argentina) M Alund (Argentina) A Collarini	6	6
2	(Netherlands) S Fransen (Netherlands) W Koolhof	1	4

Quarterfinals
1	(Peru) S Galdós (Argentina) A Molteni	2	6	[7]
WC	(Uruguay) M Cuevas (Uruguay) P Cuevas	6	2	[10]
4	(Argentina) G Andreozzi (Argentina) E Schwank
(Argentina) L Mayer (Argentina) A Velotti	w/o
(Brazil) A Ghem (Brazil) R Dutra da Silva	6	2	[10]
3	(Argentina) G Durán (Argentina) M González	2	6	[6]
(Brazil) G Clezar (Portugal) G Elias	2	1
(Argentina) M Alund (Argentina) A Collarini	6	6

Semifinals
WC	(Uruguay) M Cuevas (Uruguay) P Cuevas	w/o
(Argentina) L Mayer (Argentina) A Velotti
(Brazil) A Ghem (Brazil) R Dutra da Silva	w/o
(Argentina) M Alund (Argentina) A Collarini

Final
WC	(Uruguay) M Cuevas (Uruguay) P Cuevas	w/o
(Brazil) A Ghem (Brazil) R Dutra da Silva
