= 2015 Uruguay Open – Singles =

Singles
- 2015 Uruguay Open

Final
- Champion: (Argentina) Guido Pella
- Runner-up: (Spain) Íñigo Cervantes
- Score: 7–5, 2–6, 6–4

Events
Singles	Doubles
← 2014 ·	Uruguay Open	· 2016 →

Pablo Cuevas is the defending champion, and despite returning to defend the title, he lost to Guido Pella in the semifinals.

Pella went on to win the title, defeating Íñigo Cervantes in the final 7–5, 2–6, 6–4

== Seeds ==
1. (Uruguay) Pablo Cuevas (semifinals)
2. (Argentina) Diego Schwartzman (semifinals)
3. (Argentina) Guido Pella (champion)
4. (Spain) Íñigo Cervantes (final)
5. (United Kingdom) Kyle Edmund (second round)
6. (Argentina) Facundo Argüello (second round)
7. (Argentina) Carlos Berlocq (quarterfinals)
8. (Argentina) Horacio Zeballos (quarterfinals)

== Draw ==
=== Key ===
- Q = Qualifier
- WC = Wild card
- LL = Lucky loser
- Alt = Alternate
- SE = Special exempt
- PR = Protected ranking
- ITF = ITF entry
- JE = Junior exempt
- w/o = Walkover
- r = Retired
- d = Defaulted
- SR = Special ranking

=== Finals ===
Semifinals
1/WC	(Uruguay) Pablo Cuevas	3	2
3	(Argentina) Guido Pella	6	6
4	(Spain) Íñigo Cervantes	6	6
2	(Argentina) Diego Schwartzman	4	4

Final
3	(Argentina) Guido Pella	7	2	6
4	(Spain) Íñigo Cervantes	5	6	4

=== Top half ===
First round
1/WC	(Uruguay) P Cuevas	6	6
WC	(Uruguay) S Maresca	3	3
(Portugal) G Elias	6^{4}	6	6
(Argentina) G Andreozzi	7^{7}	4	4
(Argentina) R Olivo	4	4
(Argentina) N Kicker	6	6
WC	(Uruguay) D Acosta	0	0
7	(Argentina) C Berlocq	6	6
3	(Argentina) G Pella	4	7^{8}	7^{7}
(Argentina) M González	6	6^{6}	6^{4}
WC	(Uruguay) M Cuevas	3	1
(Argentina) F Bagnis	6	6
(Argentina) JI Londero	0	0^{r}
(Chile) C Garin	6	5
Q	(Argentina) A Collarini	6	3	4
5	(United Kingdom) K Edmund	1	6	6

Second round
1/WC	(Uruguay) P Cuevas	4	7	6
(Portugal) G Elias	6	5	3
(Argentina) N Kicker	3	1
7	(Argentina) C Berlocq	6	6
3	(Argentina) G Pella	6	6
(Argentina) F Bagnis	1	1
(Chile) C Garin	6	6
5	(United Kingdom) K Edmund	4	4

Quarterfinals
1/WC	(Uruguay) P Cuevas	6	2	6
7	(Argentina) C Berlocq	3	6	2
3	(Argentina) G Pella	6^{4}	6	7
(Chile) C Garin	7^{7}	4	5

Semifinals
1/WC	(Uruguay) P Cuevas	2	3
3	(Argentina) G Pella	6	6

=== Bottom half ===
First round
6	(Argentina) F Argüello	6	4	6
(Chile) G Lama	2	6	2
(Brazil) A Ghem	3	6	1
(Slovakia) A Martin	6	2	6
(Argentina) T Lipovšek Puches	0	4
(Austria) M Linzer	6	6
(Brazil) G Clezar	5	2
4	(Spain) Í Cervantes	7	6
8	(Argentina) H Zeballos	6	6
Q	(Argentina) G Durán	2	0
(Argentina) P Cachin	6	4	6
Q	(Argentina) Juan Ignacio Galarza	3	6	4
(Chile) H Podlipnik	6^{7}	7	2
(Spain) P Riba	7^{9}	5	6
Q	(Brazil) O Luz	6	6^{1}	1
2	(Argentina) D Schwartzman	4	7^{7}	6

Second round
6	(Argentina) F Argüello	2	1
(Slovakia) A Martin	6	6
(Austria) M Linzer	4	2
4	(Spain) Í Cervantes	6	6
8	(Argentina) H Zeballos	6	6
(Argentina) P Cachin	1	2
(Spain) P Riba	4	3
2	(Argentina) D Schwartzman	6	6

Quarterfinals
(Slovakia) A Martin	3	3
4	(Spain) Í Cervantes	6	6
8	(Argentina) H Zeballos	6^{0}	6	1
2	(Argentina) D Schwartzman	7^{7}	4	6

Semifinals
4	(Spain) Í Cervantes	6	6
2	(Argentina) D Schwartzman	4	4
