= 2018 Uruguay Open – Singles =

Singles
- 2018 Uruguay Open

Final
- Champion: (Argentina) Guido Pella
- Runner-up: (Argentina) Carlos Berlocq
- Score: 6–3, 3–6, 6–1

Events
Singles	Doubles
← 2017 ·	Uruguay Open	· 2019 →

Pablo Cuevas was the defending champion but lost in the first round to Mario Vilella Martínez.

Guido Pella won the title after defeating Carlos Berlocq 6–3, 3–6, 6–1 in the final.

== Seeds ==
1. (Uruguay) Pablo Cuevas (first round)
2. (Argentina) Guido Pella (champion)
3. (Argentina) Guido Andreozzi (second round)
4. (Spain) Pablo Andújar (second round)
5. (Brazil) Thiago Monteiro (second round)
6. (Bolivia) Hugo Dellien (second round)
7. (Italy) Paolo Lorenzi (second round)
8. (Argentina) Juan Ignacio Londero (first round)

== Draw ==
=== Key ===
- Q = Qualifier
- WC = Wild card
- LL = Lucky loser
- Alt = Alternate
- SE = Special exempt
- PR = Protected ranking
- ITF = ITF entry
- JE = Junior exempt
- w/o = Walkover
- r = Retired
- d = Defaulted
- SR = Special ranking

=== Finals ===
Semifinals
(Spain) Mario Vilella Martínez	1	4
(Argentina) Carlos Berlocq	6	6
(Portugal) Pedro Sousa	6	3	4
2	(Argentina) Guido Pella	2	6	6

Final
(Argentina) Carlos Berlocq	3	6	1
2	(Argentina) Guido Pella	6	3	6

=== Top half ===
First round
1	(Uruguay) P Cuevas	2	2
(Spain) M Vilella Martínez	6	6
WC	(Brazil) T Seyboth Wild	2	6	2
Q	(Bulgaria) D Kuzmanov	6	4	6
WC	(Spain) C Taberner	6^{7}	6^{5}
WC	(Uruguay) M Cuevas	7^{9}	7^{7}
Q	(Argentina) F Díaz Acosta	2	5
5	(Brazil) T Monteiro	6	7
4	(Spain) P Andújar	6	6
(Portugal) J Domingues	0	3
Alt	(Argentina) F Argüello	5	6	6
(Belgium) A De Greef	7	3	3
(Argentina) F Bagnis	2	0
(Argentina) C Berlocq	6	6
Q	(Argentina) F Coria	6	0	6^{2}
7	(Italy) P Lorenzi	3	6	7^{7}

Second round
(Spain) M Vilella Martínez	6	7^{7}
Q	(Bulgaria) D Kuzmanov	2	6^{3}
WC	(Uruguay) M Cuevas	4	7	7
5	(Brazil) T Monteiro	6	5	5
4	(Spain) P Andújar	6^{4}	5
Alt	(Argentina) F Argüello	7^{7}	7
(Argentina) C Berlocq	3	6	7
7	(Italy) P Lorenzi	6	2	5

Quarterfinals
(Spain) M Vilella Martínez	6	6
WC	(Uruguay) M Cuevas	3	4
Alt	(Argentina) F Argüello	3	6	5
(Argentina) C Berlocq	6	3	7

Semifinals
(Spain) M Vilella Martínez	1	4
(Argentina) C Berlocq	6	6

=== Bottom half ===
First round
6	(Bolivia) H Dellien	6	6
WC	(Uruguay) F Llanes	2	3
(Spain) D Gimeno Traver	6	6
(Portugal) G Elias	4	1
(Brazil) G Clezar	1	2
(Portugal) P Sousa	6	6
Q	(Argentina) Juan Ignacio Galarza	6	5	3
3	(Argentina) G Andreozzi	1	7	6
8	(Argentina) JI Londero	7	1	2
(Argentina) P Cachin	5	6	6
(Italy) L Giustino	6	6
(Brazil) T Bellucci	3	3
(Italy) F Gaio	6^{5}	5
(Serbia) P Krstin	7^{7}	7
(Dominican Republic) R Cid Subervi	4	1
2	(Argentina) G Pella	6	6

Second round
6	(Bolivia) H Dellien	5	5
(Spain) D Gimeno Traver	7	7
(Portugal) P Sousa	6	6
3	(Argentina) G Andreozzi	1	3
(Argentina) P Cachin	1	3
(Italy) L Giustino	6	6
(Serbia) P Krstin	6	3	5
2	(Argentina) G Pella	1	6	7

Quarterfinals
(Spain) D Gimeno Traver	6	5	1
(Portugal) P Sousa	3	7	6
(Italy) L Giustino	1	2^{r}
2	(Argentina) G Pella	6	3

Semifinals
(Portugal) P Sousa	6	3	4
2	(Argentina) G Pella	2	6	6
