= 2019 Uruguay Open – Doubles =

Doubles
- 2019 Uruguay Open

Final
- Champions: (Argentina) Facundo Bagnis (Argentina) Andrés Molteni
- Runners-up: (Brazil) Orlando Luz (Brazil) Rafael Matos
- Score: 6–4, 5–7, [12–10]

Events
| Singles | Doubles |
- Uruguay Open

Guido Andreozzi and Guillermo Durán were the defending champions but chose not to defend their title.

Facundo Bagnis and Andrés Molteni won the title after defeating Orlando Luz and Rafael Matos 6–4, 5–7, [12–10] in the final.

== Seeds ==
1. (Uruguay) Ariel Behar / (Ecuador) Gonzalo Escobar (quarterfinals)
2. (Mexico) Miguel Ángel Reyes-Varela / (Brazil) Fernando Romboli (semifinals)
3. (Argentina) Facundo Bagnis / (Argentina) Andrés Molteni (champions)
4. (Venezuela) Luis David Martínez / (Brazil) Felipe Meligeni Alves (quarterfinals)

== Draw ==
Key

- Q = Qualifier
- WC = Wild card
- LL = Lucky loser
- Alt = Alternate
- ITF = ITF entry
- PR = Protected ranking
- SR = Special ranking
- SE = Special exempt
- JE = Junior exempt
- JR = Junior Accelerator Programme entrant
- CO = College Accelerator Programme entrant
- NG = Next Gen Accelerator Program entrant
- w/o = Walkover
- r = Retired
- d = Defaulted

First round
1 | (Uruguay) A Behar (Ecuador) G Escobar | 7 | 6
(Peru) N Álvarez (Argentina) A Collarini | 5 | 4
(Peru) M Echazú (Argentina) G Villanueva | 5 | 3
(Brazil) O Luz (Brazil) R Matos | 7 | 6
4 | (Venezuela) LD Martínez (Brazil) F Meligeni Alves | 6 | 7
(Uruguay) M Cuevas (Argentina) F Mena | 2 | 5
WC | (Uruguay) F Llanes (Uruguay) F Roncadelli | 4 | 2
(Bolivia) B Arias (Bolivia) F Zeballos | 6 | 6
WC | (Uruguay) D Acosta (Uruguay) R Arús | 0 | 2
(Peru) S Galdós (Argentina) R Olivo | 6 | 6
(Peru) A Merino (Spain) M Vilella Martínez | 4 | 4
3 | (Argentina) F Bagnis (Argentina) A Molteni | 6 | 6
WC | (Uruguay) JM Fumeaux (Uruguay) Emiliano Troche | w/o
(Brazil) P Sakamoto (Brazil) T Seyboth Wild
(Spain) J Munar (Netherlands) M Vervoort | 6 | 3 | [7]
2 | (Mexico) MÁ Reyes-Varela (Brazil) F Romboli | 3 | 6 | [10]

Quarterfinals
1 | (Uruguay) A Behar (Ecuador) G Escobar | 6 | 4 | [8]
(Brazil) O Luz (Brazil) R Matos | 4 | 6 | [10]
4 | (Venezuela) LD Martínez (Brazil) F Meligeni Alves | 1 | 2
(Bolivia) B Arias (Bolivia) F Zeballos | 6 | 6
(Peru) S Galdós (Argentina) R Olivo | 5 | 3
3 | (Argentina) F Bagnis (Argentina) A Molteni | 7 | 6
WC | (Uruguay) JM Fumeaux (Uruguay) E Troche | 1 | 2
2 | (Mexico) MÁ Reyes-Varela (Brazil) F Romboli | 6 | 6

Semifinals
(Brazil) O Luz (Brazil) R Matos | 6 | 6
(Bolivia) B Arias (Bolivia) F Zeballos | 4 | 3
3 | (Argentina) F Bagnis (Argentina) A Molteni | 6 | 6
2 | (Mexico) MÁ Reyes-Varela (Brazil) F Romboli | 1 | 4

Final
(Brazil) O Luz (Brazil) R Matos | 4 | 7 | [10]
3 | (Argentina) F Bagnis (Argentina) A Molteni | 6 | 5 | [12]
