= 2018 Uruguay Open – Doubles =

Doubles
- 2018 Uruguay Open

Final
- Champions: (Argentina) Guido Andreozzi; (Argentina) Guillermo Durán
- Runners-up: (Argentina) Facundo Bagnis; (Argentina) Andrés Molteni
- Score: 7–6^{(7–5)}, 6–4

Events
Singles	Doubles
- Uruguay Open

Romain Arneodo and Fernando Romboli were the defending champions but only Romboli chose to defend his title, partnering Fabrício Neis. Romboli lost in the first round to Sergio Galdós and Federico Zeballos.

Guido Andreozzi and Guillermo Durán won the title after defeating Facundo Bagnis and Andrés Molteni 7–6^{(7–5)}, 6–4 in the final.

== Seeds ==
1. (Brazil) Marcelo Demoliner / (Ecuador) Gonzalo Escobar (semifinals)
2. (Brazil) Fabrício Neis / (Brazil) Fernando Romboli (first round)
3. (Argentina) Guido Andreozzi / (Argentina) Guillermo Durán (champions)
4. (Argentina) Facundo Bagnis / (Argentina) Andrés Molteni (final)

== Draw ==
Key

- Q = Qualifier
- WC = Wild card
- LL = Lucky loser
- Alt = Alternate
- ITF = ITF entry
- PR = Protected ranking
- SR = Special ranking
- SE = Special exempt
- JE = Junior exempt
- JR = Junior Accelerator Programme entrant
- CO = College Accelerator Programme entrant
- NG = Next Gen Accelerator Program entrant
- w/o = Walkover
- r = Retired
- d = Defaulted

First round

Quarterfinals

Semifinals

Final

1
- (Brazil) M Demoliner
- (Ecuador) G Escobar
6
6

WC
- (Uruguay) D Acosta
- (Uruguay) F Roncadelli
4
1

1
- (Brazil) M Demoliner
- (Ecuador) G Escobar
6
6

WC
- (Uruguay) F Llanes
- (Brazil) T Seyboth Wild
6
2
[6]

- (Italy) F Gaio
- (Italy) P Lorenzi
1
1

- (Italy) F Gaio
- (Italy) P Lorenzi
2
6
[10]

1
- (Brazil) M Demoliner
- (Ecuador) G Escobar
6
6^{7}
[8]

3
- (Argentina) G Andreozzi
- (Argentina) G Durán
6
6

3
- (Argentina) G Andreozzi
- (Argentina) G Durán
2
7^{9}
[10]

- (Dominican Republic) R Cid Subervi
- (Serbia) P Krstin
0
1

3
- (Argentina) G Andreozzi
- (Argentina) G Durán
7^{7}
6

(Argentina) T Lipovšek Puches
(Argentina) Matías Zukas
6
6

(Argentina) T Lipovšek Puches
(Argentina) M Zukas
6^{5}
4

- (Argentina) C Berlocq
- (Argentina) G Pella
3
2

3
- (Argentina) G Andreozzi
- (Argentina) G Durán
7^{7}
6

- (Portugal) J Domingues
- (Portugal) G Elias
3
6
[10]

4
- (Argentina) F Bagnis
- (Argentina) A Molteni
6^{5}
4

- (Belgium) A De Greef
- (Italy) L Giustino
6
1
[7]

- (Portugal) J Domingues
- (Portugal) G Elias
4
7^{7}
[6]

WC
- (Uruguay) R Arús
- (Brazil) G Clezar
3
3

4
- (Argentina) F Bagnis
- (Argentina) A Molteni
6
6^{4}
[10]

4
- (Argentina) F Bagnis
- (Argentina) A Molteni
6
6

4
- (Argentina) F Bagnis
- (Argentina) A Molteni
6^{3}
6
[10]

- (Uruguay) M Cuevas
- (Bolivia) H Dellien
3
3

- (Peru) S Galdós
- (Bolivia) F Zeballos
7^{7}
3
[6]

- (Argentina) F Agamenone
- (Argentina) F Argüello
6
6

- (Argentina) F Agamenone
- (Argentina) F Argüello
4
6^{2}

- (Peru) S Galdós
- (Bolivia) F Zeballos
3
7
[10]

- (Peru) S Galdós
- (Bolivia) F Zeballos
6
7^{7}

2
- (Brazil) F Neis
- (Brazil) F Romboli
6
5
[8]
