= 2017 Uruguay Open – Doubles =

Doubles
- 2017 Uruguay Open

Final
- Champions: (Monaco) Romain Arneodo (Brazil) Fernando Romboli
- Runners-up: (Uruguay) Ariel Behar (Brazil) Fabiano de Paula
- Score: 2–6, 6–4, [10–8]

Events
Singles	Doubles
- Uruguay Open

Andrés Molteni and Diego Schwartzman were the defending champions but only Molteni chose to defend his title, partnering Sergio Galdós. Molteni lost in the first round to Pedro Cachin and Nicolás Jarry.

Romain Arneodo and Fernando Romboli won the title after defeating Ariel Behar and Fabiano de Paula 2–6, 6–4, [10–8] in the final.

== Seeds ==
1. (Peru) Sergio Galdós / (Argentina) Andrés Molteni (first round)
2. (El Salvador) Marcelo Arévalo / (Mexico) Miguel Ángel Reyes-Varela (quarterfinals)
3. (Uruguay) Ariel Behar / (Brazil) Fabiano de Paula (final)
4. (Argentina) Guido Andreozzi / (Argentina) Máximo González (semifinals)

== Draw ==
Key

- Q = Qualifier
- WC = Wild card
- LL = Lucky loser
- Alt = Alternate
- ITF = ITF entry
- PR = Protected ranking
- SR = Special ranking
- SE = Special exempt
- JE = Junior exempt
- JR = Junior Accelerator Programme entrant
- CO = College Accelerator Programme entrant
- NG = Next Gen Accelerator Program entrant
- w/o = Walkover
- r = Retired
- d = Defaulted

First round
1	(Peru) S Galdós (Argentina) A Molteni	3	4
(Argentina) P Cachin (Chile) N Jarry	6	6
(Monaco) R Arneodo (Brazil) F Romboli	6	6
(Spain) R Carballés Baena (Argentina) A Collarini	3	2
4	(Argentina) G Andreozzi (Argentina) M González	6	6
(Portugal) G Oliveira (Poland) G Panfil	2	4
(Brazil) G Clezar (Brazil) F Neis	6	6
Alt	(Brazil) J Pereira (Brazil) JP Sorgi	3	3
(Argentina) F Coria (Portugal) J Domingues	6^{12}	4
(Hungary) A Balázs (Brazil) J Souza	7^{14}	6
WC	(Uruguay) M Cuevas (Uruguay) P Cuevas	6	3	[9]
3	(Uruguay) A Behar (Brazil) F de Paula	4	6	[11]
(Brazil) R Dutra Silva (Portugal) G Elias	6	3	[8]
WC	(Argentina) F Bagnis (Uruguay) M Felder	3	6	[10]
WC	(Uruguay) S Maresca (Uruguay) N Xiviller	1	4
2	(El Salvador) M Arévalo (Mexico) MÁ Reyes-Varela	6	6

Quarterfinals
(Argentina) P Cachin (Chile) N Jarry	4	2
(Monaco) R Arneodo (Brazil) F Romboli	6	6
4	(Argentina) G Andreozzi (Argentina) M González	7^{7}	6^{5}	[10]
(Brazil) G Clezar (Brazil) F Neis	6^{2}	7^{7}	[2]
(Hungary) A Balázs (Brazil) J Souza	2	3
3	(Uruguay) A Behar (Brazil) F de Paula	6	6
WC	(Argentina) F Bagnis (Uruguay) M Felder	7	1	[14]
2	(El Salvador) M Arévalo (Mexico) MÁ Reyes-Varela	5	6	[12]

Semifinals
(Monaco) R Arneodo (Brazil) F Romboli	6	7
4	(Argentina) G Andreozzi (Argentina) M González	2	5
3	(Uruguay) A Behar (Brazil) F de Paula	3	7	[10]
WC	(Argentina) F Bagnis (Uruguay) M Felder	6	5	[5]

Final
(Monaco) R Arneodo (Brazil) F Romboli	2	6	[10]
3	(Uruguay) A Behar (Brazil) F de Paula	6	4	[8]
