= 2011 Copa Petrobras Montevideo – Doubles =

Doubles
- 2011 Copa Petrobras Montevideo

Final
- Champions: (Serbia) Nikola Ćirić (Montenegro) Goran Tošić
- Runners-up: (Uruguay) Marcel Felder (Argentina) Diego Schwartzman
- Score: 7–6^{(7–5)}, 7–6^{(7–4)}

Events
Singles	Doubles
- Copa Petrobras Montevideo

Carlos Berlocq and Brian Dabul were the defending champions, but decided not to participate.
Nikola Ćirić and Goran Tošić won the title, defeating Marcel Felder and Diego Schwartzman 7–6^{(7–5)}, 7–6^{(7–4)} in the final.

== Seeds ==
1. (Argentina) Máximo González / (Argentina) Diego Junqueira (first round)
2. (Uruguay) Marcel Felder / (Argentina) Diego Schwartzman (final)
3. (Argentina) Juan Pablo Brzezicki / (Argentina) Andrés Molteni (quarterfinals)
4. (Argentina) Alejandro Fabbri / (Argentina) Renzo Olivo (first round)

== Draw ==
Key

- Q = Qualifier
- WC = Wild card
- LL = Lucky loser
- Alt = Alternate
- ITF = ITF entry
- PR = Protected ranking
- SR = Special ranking
- SE = Special exempt
- JE = Junior exempt
- JR = Junior Accelerator Programme entrant
- CO = College Accelerator Programme entrant
- NG = Next Gen Accelerator Program entrant
- w/o = Walkover
- r = Retired
- d = Defaulted

=== Draw ===
First round
1	(Argentina) M González (Argentina) D Junqueira	2	4
WC	(Ecuador) D Hidalgo (Ecuador) R Quiroz	6	6
(Argentina) F Argüello (Argentina) Nicolás Pastor	4	3
WC	(Uruguay) S Maresca (Uruguay) Rodrigo Senattore	6	6
3	(Argentina) JP Brzezicki (Argentina) A Molteni	w/o
(Guatemala) C Díaz Figueroa (Argentina) Guido Pella
(Serbia) N Ćirić (Montenegro) G Tošić	7^{7}	6
(Slovakia) P Červenák (United States) A Collarini	6^{5}	2
(France) Axel Michon (France) G Rufin
(Italy) A di Mauro (Italy) G Naso	w/o
WC	(Peru) D Beretta (Uruguay) M Cuevas	6	6
4	(Argentina) A Fabbri (Argentina) R Olivo	4	4
(Argentina) M Alund (Argentina) J-M Aranguren	6	7
(Portugal) G Elias (Portugal) L Tavares	1	5
(Italy) A Giannessi (Chile) N Massú
2	(Uruguay) M Felder (Argentina) Diego Schwartzman	w/o

Quarterfinals
WC	(Ecuador) D Hidalgo (Ecuador) R Quiroz	6	6
WC	(Uruguay) S Maresca (Uruguay) R Senattore	3	1
3	(Argentina) JP Brzezicki (Argentina) A Molteni	2	6	[3]
(Serbia) N Ćirić (Montenegro) G Tošić	6	3	[10]
(Italy) A di Mauro (Italy) G Naso	1r
WC	(Peru) D Beretta (Uruguay) M Cuevas	4
(Argentina) M Alund (Argentina) J-M Aranguren	1	2
2	(Uruguay) M Felder (Argentina) D Schwartzman	6	6

Semifinals
WC	(Ecuador) D Hidalgo (Ecuador) R Quiroz	4	5
(Serbia) N Ćirić (Montenegro) G Tošić	6	7
WC	(Peru) D Beretta (Uruguay) M Cuevas	2	6	[5]
2	(Uruguay) M Felder (Argentina) D Schwartzman	6	3	[10]

Final
(Serbia) N Ćirić (Montenegro) G Tošić	7^{7}	7^{7}
2	(Uruguay) M Felder (Argentina) D Schwartzman	6^{5}	6^{4}
