= 2011 Copa Petrobras Montevideo – Singles =

Singles
- 2011 Copa Petrobras Montevideo

Final
- Champion: (Argentina) Carlos Berlocq
- Runner-up: (Argentina) Máximo González
- Score: 6–2, 7–5

Events
Singles	Doubles
← 2010 ·	Copa Petrobras Montevideo	· 2012 →

Máximo González was the defending champion, but he lost in the final 2–6, 5–7 against Carlos Berlocq.

== Seeds ==
1. (Argentina) Carlos Berlocq (champion)
2. (Argentina) Leonardo Mayer (semifinals)
3. (Argentina) Diego Junqueira (second round)
4. (Brazil) João Souza (quarterfinals)
5. (Brazil) Rogério Dutra da Silva (quarterfinals)
6. (Argentina) Máximo González (final)
7. (United States) Wayne Odesnik (first round)
8. (Italy) Alessandro Giannessi (semifinals)

== Draw ==
=== Key ===
- Q = Qualifier
- WC = Wild card
- LL = Lucky loser
- Alt = Alternate
- SE = Special exempt
- PR = Protected ranking
- ITF = ITF entry
- JE = Junior exempt
- w/o = Walkover
- r = Retired
- d = Defaulted
- SR = Special ranking

=== Finals ===
Semifinals
1	(Argentina) Carlos Berlocq	6	6
8	(Italy) Alessandro Giannessi	2	2
6	(Argentina) Máximo González	6	7
2	(Argentina) Leonardo Mayer	3	5

Final
1	(Argentina) Carlos Berlocq	6	7
6	(Argentina) Máximo González	2	5

=== Top half ===
First round
1	(Argentina) C Berlocq	7^{7}	3	6
(Italy) G Naso	6^{4}	6	0
Q	(Argentina) A Fabbri	6^{4}	6^{4}
(Slovakia) P Červenák	7^{7}	7^{7}
(Argentina) F Bagnis	3	7^{7}	7
(Argentina) F Argüello	6	6^{4}	5
Q	(Argentina) A Velotti	6	6
7	(United States) W Odesnik	3	2
4	(Brazil) J Souza	6	6
WC	(Brazil) T Fernandes	3	1
(France) Axel Michon	5	7	2
(Uruguay) M Felder	7	5	6
WC	(Uruguay) M Cuevas	7^{8}	2	7^{7}
(Portugal) G Elias	6^{6}	6	6^{4}
(Australia) J Duckworth	4	4
8	(Italy) A Giannessi	6	6

Second round
1	(Argentina) C Berlocq	6^{7}	6	6
(Slovakia) P Červenák	7^{9}	3	3
(Argentina) F Bagnis	7^{8}	6
Q	(Argentina) A Velotti	6^{6}	2
4	(Brazil) J Souza	6	6
(Uruguay) M Felder	3	0
WC	(Uruguay) M Cuevas	4	7	4
8	(Italy) A Giannessi	6	5	6

Quarterfinals
1	(Argentina) C Berlocq	7^{9}	4	6
(Argentina) F Bagnis	6^{7}	6	0
4	(Brazil) J Souza	3	3
8	(Italy) A Giannessi	6	6

Semifinals
1	(Argentina) C Berlocq	6	6
8	(Italy) A Giannessi	2	2

=== Bottom half ===
First round
6	(Argentina) M González	6	6
WC	(Ecuador) D Hidalgo	1	2
(Italy) A di Mauro	6	6
Q	(Argentina) Diego Schwartzman	4	3
WC	(Chile) N Massú	3	4
(Russia) A Kuznetsov	6	6
Q	(Argentina) R Olivo	2	2
3	(Argentina) D Junqueira	6	6
5	(Brazil) R Dutra da Silva	6	6
(Argentina) M Alund	3	3
(Serbia) N Ćirić	6	6
(Argentina) P Galdón	1	2
(Argentina) JP Brzezicki	5	6	6
(France) G Rufin	7	4	2
(Argentina) A Molteni	3	3
2	(Argentina) L Mayer	6	6

Second round
6	(Argentina) M González	6	6
(Italy) A di Mauro	2	0
(Russia) A Kuznetsov	6	6
3	(Argentina) D Junqueira	3	4
5	(Brazil) R Dutra da Silva	6	6
(Serbia) N Ćirić	3	1
(Argentina) JP Brzezicki	7	3	2
2	(Argentina) L Mayer	5	6	6

Quarterfinals
6	(Argentina) M González	7^{7}	6
(Russia) A Kuznetsov	6^{2}	2
5	(Brazil) R Dutra da Silva	4	3
2	(Argentina) L Mayer	6	6

Semifinals
6	(Argentina) M González	6	7
2	(Argentina) L Mayer	3	5
