= 2014 Uruguay Open – Singles =

Singles
- 2014 Uruguay Open

Final
- Champion: (Uruguay) Pablo Cuevas
- Runner-up: (Bolivia) Hugo Dellien
- Score: 6–2, 6–4

Events
| Singles | Doubles |
| ← 2013 · | Uruguay Open | · 2015 → |

Thomaz Bellucci was the defending champion, however he chose not to participate.

Pablo Cuevas won the title, defeating Hugo Dellien in the final, 6–2, 6–4.

== Seeds ==
1. (Uruguay) Pablo Cuevas (champion)
2. (Spain) Pere Riba (first round)
3. (Argentina) Facundo Argüello (semifinals)
4. (Chile) Gonzalo Lama (first round)
5. (Chile) Nicolás Jarry (quarterfinals)
6. (Spain) Jordi Samper Montaña (quarterfinals)
7. (Argentina) Andrés Molteni (quarterfinals)
8. (Argentina) Pedro Cachin (semifinals)

== Draw ==
=== Key ===
- Q = Qualifier
- WC = Wild card
- LL = Lucky loser
- Alt = Alternate
- SE = Special exempt
- PR = Protected ranking
- ITF = ITF entry
- JE = Junior exempt
- w/o = Walkover
- r = Retired
- d = Defaulted
- SR = Special ranking

=== Finals ===
Semifinals
1/WC | (Uruguay) Pablo Cuevas | 6 | 6
8 | (Argentina) Pedro Cachin | 3 | 0
3 | (Argentina) Facundo Argüello | 6 | 0 | 4
(Bolivia) Hugo Dellien | 1 | 6 | 6

Finals
1/WC | (Uruguay) Pablo Cuevas | 6 | 6
(Bolivia) Hugo Dellien | 2 | 4

=== Top half ===
First round
1/WC | (Uruguay) P Cuevas | 6 | 6
Alt | (Japan) Ryusei Makiguchi | 4 | 1
WC | (Uruguay) Rodrigo Senattore | 6 | 7^{7}
WC | (Uruguay) S Maresca | 1 | 6^{3}
Alt | (Argentina) JP Ficovich | 6 | 6
(Brazil) A Miele | 4 | 0
(Brazil) Wilson Leite | 4 | 2
5 | (Chile) N Jarry | 6 | 6
4 | (Chile) G Lama | 7^{10} | 4 | 1
(Italy) G Quinzi | 6^{8} | 6 | 6
(Argentina) T Lipovšek Puches | 6 | 6
Alt | (Brazil) Marcos V. Dias | 2 | 1
(Argentina) M Trungelliti | 4 | 6 | 6
Q | (Canada) David Volfson | 6 | 2 | 1
Alt | (Brazil) JP Sorgi | 7 | 3 | 2
8 | (Argentina) Pedro Cachin | 5 | 6 | 6

Second round
1/WC | (Uruguay) P Cuevas | 6 | 6
WC | (Uruguay) R Senattore | 1 | 3
Alt | (Argentina) JP Ficovich | 4 | 2
5 | (Chile) N Jarry | 6 | 6
(Italy) G Quinzi | 7^{7} | 6
(Argentina) T Lipovšek Puches | 6^{2} | 2
(Argentina) M Trungelliti | 6 | 6^{5} | 4
8 | (Argentina) P Cachin | 2 | 7^{7} | 6

Quarterfinals
1/WC | (Uruguay) P Cuevas | 7^{7} | 6
5 | (Chile) N Jarry | 6^{4} | 4
(Italy) G Quinzi | 6^{7} | 4
8 | (Argentina) P Cachin | 7^{9} | 6

Semifinals
1/WC | (Uruguay) P Cuevas | 6 | 6
8 | (Argentina) P Cachin | 3 | 0

=== Bottom half ===
First round
7 | (Argentina) A Molteni | 7 | 7^{8}
(Uruguay) M Cuevas | 5 | 6^{6}
Q | (Argentina) Matías Buchhass | 1 | 6 | 1
(Argentina) F Coria | 6 | 4 | 6
(France) M Bourque | 6 | 3 | 6
(Argentina) N Kicker | 3 | 6 | 4
Q | (Argentina) Luciano Doria | 1 | 3
3 | (Argentina) F Argüello | 6 | 6
6 | (Spain) J Samper Montaña | 3 | 6 | 6
Alt | (Argentina) Juan Ignacio Ameal | 6 | 3 | 1
(Argentina) R Olivo | 6 | 6
WC | (Uruguay) A Behar | 2 | 4
Q | (Argentina) Manuel Barros | 1 | 0^{r}
Alt | (Argentina) Sebastián E. Pini | 6 | 2
(Bolivia) H Dellien | 6 | 3
2 | (Spain) P Riba | 2 | 0^{r}

Second round
7 | (Argentina) A Molteni | 6 | 7
(Argentina) F Coria | 3 | 5
(France) M Bourque | 3 | 4
3 | (Argentina) F Argüello | 6 | 6
6 | (Spain) J Samper Montaña | 6 | 4 | 6
(Argentina) R Olivo | 4 | 6 | 3
Alt | (Argentina) SE Pini | 3 | 2
(Bolivia) H Dellien | 6 | 6

Quarterfinals
7 | (Argentina) A Molteni | 4 | 5
3 | (Argentina) F Argüello | 6 | 7
6 | (Spain) J Samper Montaña | 7^{7} | 2 | 1
(Bolivia) H Dellien | 6^{3} | 6 | 6

Semifinals
3 | (Argentina) F Argüello | 6 | 0 | 4
(Bolivia) H Dellien | 1 | 6 | 6
