= 2019 Uruguay Open – Singles =

Singles
- 2019 Uruguay Open

Final
- Champion: (Spain) Jaume Munar
- Runner-up: (Argentina) Federico Delbonis
- Score: 7–5, 6–2

Events
Singles	Doubles
← 2018 ·	Uruguay Open	· 2021 →

Guido Pella was the defending champion but chose not to defend his title.

Jaume Munar won the title after defeating Federico Delbonis 7–5, 6–2 in the final.

== Seeds ==
All seeds receive a bye into the second round.

1. (Uruguay) Pablo Cuevas (third round)
2. (Bolivia) Hugo Dellien (quarterfinals)
3. (Argentina) Federico Delbonis (final)
4. (Brazil) Thiago Monteiro (second round)
5. (Spain) Jaume Munar (champion)
6. (Slovakia) Andrej Martin (quarterfinals)
7. (Argentina) Federico Coria (third round)
8. (Argentina) Facundo Bagnis (quarterfinals)
9. (Peru) Juan Pablo Varillas (second round)
10. (Spain) Mario Vilella Martínez (third round, retired)
11. (Slovakia) Jozef Kovalík (third round)
12. (Germany) Yannick Hanfmann (second round)
13. (Brazil) João Menezes (second round)
14. (Portugal) João Domingues (third round)
15. (Argentina) Facundo Mena (third round)
16. (Argentina) Andrea Collarini (quarterfinals)

== Draw ==
=== Key ===
- Q = Qualifier
- WC = Wild card
- LL = Lucky loser
- Alt = Alternate
- SE = Special exempt
- PR = Protected ranking
- ITF = ITF entry
- JE = Junior exempt
- w/o = Walkover
- r = Retired
- d = Defaulted
- SR = Special ranking

=== Finals ===
Quarterfinals
WC	(Argentina) Juan Manuel Cerúndolo	7^{7}	7^{8}
8	(Argentina) Facundo Bagnis	6^{2}	6^{6}
3	(Argentina) Federico Delbonis	6	7^{10}
6	(Slovakia) Andrej Martin	3	6^{8}
5	(Spain) Jaume Munar	4	6	6
16	(Argentina) Andrea Collarini	6	3	1
(Brazil) Thiago Seyboth Wild	6	6
2	(Bolivia) Hugo Dellien	2	4

Semifinals
WC	(Argentina) Juan Manuel Cerúndolo	2	6^{4}
3	(Argentina) Federico Delbonis	6	7^{7}
5	(Spain) Jaume Munar	3	7^{7}	6
(Brazil) Thiago Seyboth Wild	6	6^{1}	0

Final
3	(Argentina) Federico Delbonis	5	2
5	(Spain) Jaume Munar	7	6

=== Top half ===
==== Section 1 ====
First round
(Argentina) R Olivo	7^{7}	6
(Argentina) TM Etcheverry	6^{3}	1
WC	(Argentina) JM Cerúndolo	6	6
WC	(Uruguay) F Llanes	2	3
LL	(Bolivia) B Arias	2	2
Alt	(Argentina) S Báez	6	6
(Brazil) F Meligeni Alves	1	6	6
WC	(Argentina) F Díaz Acosta	6	1	4

Second round
1/WC	(Uruguay) P Cuevas	7^{7}	6
(Argentina) R Olivo	6^{3}	0
WC	(Argentina) JM Cerúndolo	7^{7}	7
13	(Brazil) J Menezes	6^{4}	5
9	(Peru) JP Varillas	3	3
Alt	(Argentina) S Báez	6	6
(Brazil) F Meligeni Alves	1	1^{r}
8	(Argentina) F Bagnis	6	4

Third round
1/WC	(Uruguay) P Cuevas	3	6^{6}
WC	(Argentina) JM Cerúndolo	6	7^{8}
Alt	(Argentina) S Báez	2	3
8	(Argentina) F Bagnis	6	6

Quarterfinals
WC	(Argentina) JM Cerúndolo	7^{7}	7^{8}
8	(Argentina) F Bagnis	6^{2}	6^{6}

==== Section 2 ====
First round
WC	(Uruguay) F Roncadelli	3	0
(Serbia) P Krstin	6	6
Q	(Bolivia) F Zeballos	0	7^{8}	7
(Uruguay) M Cuevas	6	6^{6}	5
(Romania) FC Jianu	6	6
Q	(Peru) M Echazú	1	1
(Brazil) O Luz	4	3
(Brazil) P Sakamoto	6	6

Second round
3	(Argentina) F Delbonis	6	6
(Serbia) P Krstin	4	4
Q	(Bolivia) F Zeballos	0	4
15	(Argentina) F Mena	6	6
10	(Spain) M Vilella Martínez	6	5	6
(Romania) FC Jianu	2	7	4
(Brazil) P Sakamoto	2	2
6	(Slovakia) A Martin	6	6

Third round
3	(Argentina) F Delbonis	6	6^{6}	7^{7}
15	(Argentina) F Mena	3	7^{8}	6^{3}
10	(Spain) M Vilella Martínez	2^{r}
6	(Slovakia) A Martin	4

Quarterfinals
3	(Argentina) F Delbonis	6	7^{10}
6	(Slovakia) A Martin	3	6^{8}

=== Bottom half ===
==== Section 3 ====
First round
(Argentina) G Villanueva	6	0	2
Alt	(Brazil) R Matos	4	6	6
(Argentina) GA Olivieri	5	6	6
(Brazil) Oscar José Gutierrez	7	3	4
(Brazil) Wilson Leite	3	6	3
(Argentina) A Velotti	6	2	6
(Chile) A Tabilo	6	3	3
(Brazil) G Clezar	3	6	6

Second round
5	(Spain) J Munar	6	2	6
Alt	(Brazil) R Matos	3	6	4
(Argentina) GA Olivieri	6^{10}	1
11	(Slovakia) J Kovalík	7^{12}	6
16	(Argentina) A Collarini	6	6
(Argentina) A Velotti	4	4
(Brazil) G Clezar	7^{8}	6^{6}	6
4	(Brazil) T Monteiro	6^{6}	7^{8}	3

Third round
5	(Spain) J Munar	4	7	6
11	(Slovakia) J Kovalík	6	5	3
16	(Argentina) A Collarini	6	6
(Brazil) G Clezar	3	4

Quarterfinals
5	(Spain) J Munar	4	6	6
16	(Argentina) A Collarini	6	3	1

==== Section 4 ====
First round
(Sweden) C Lindell	6	6
(Peru) N Álvarez	2	4
(Argentina) JP Ficovich	2	4
(Brazil) T Seyboth Wild	6	6
(Argentina) F Cerúndolo	6	6
(Colombia) A González	2	1
(Colombia) N Mejía	7^{7}	7^{9}
(United States) U Blanch	6^{5}	6^{7}

Second round
7	(Argentina) F Coria	6	7^{7}
(Sweden) C Lindell	1	6^{3}
(Brazil) T Seyboth Wild	7	4	6
12	(Germany) Y Hanfmann	5	6	3
14	(Portugal) J Domingues	2	6	6
(Argentina) F Cerúndolo	6	4	2
(Colombia) N Mejía	6	3	1
2	(Bolivia) H Dellien	1	6	6

Third round
7	(Argentina) F Coria	2	1
(Brazil) T Seyboth Wild	6	6
14	(Portugal) J Domingues	3	2
2	(Bolivia) H Dellien	6	6

Quarterfinals
(Brazil) T Seyboth Wild	6	6
2	(Bolivia) H Dellien	2	4
