= 2012 Uruguay Open – Doubles =

Doubles
- 2012 Uruguay Open

Final
- Champions: (Croatia) Nikola Mektić (Croatia) Antonio Veić
- Runners-up: (Slovenia) Blaž Kavčič (Croatia) Franco Škugor
- Score: 6–3, 5–7, [10–7]

Events
Singles	Doubles
← 2011 ·	Uruguay Open	· 2013 →

Nikola Ćirić and Goran Tošić were the defending champions but Ćirić decided not to participate.
Tošić played alongside Boris Pašanski.
Nikola Mektić and Antonio Veić defeated Blaž Kavčič and Franco Škugor 6–3, 5–7, [10–7] in the final to win the title.

== Seeds ==
1. (Uruguay) Ariel Behar / (Argentina) Horacio Zeballos (semifinals)
2. (Argentina) Guillermo Durán / (Uruguay) Marcel Felder (semifinals)
3. (Serbia) Boris Pašanski / (Montenegro) Goran Tošić (first round)
4. (Croatia) Nikola Mektić / (Croatia) Antonio Veić (champions)

== Draw ==
=== Key ===
- Q = Qualifier
- WC = Wild card
- LL = Lucky loser
- Alt = Alternate
- SE = Special exempt
- PR = Protected ranking
- ITF = ITF entry
- JE = Junior exempt
- w/o = Walkover
- r = Retired
- d = Defaulted
- SR = Special ranking

=== Draw ===
First round
1	(Uruguay) A Behar (Argentina) H Zeballos	6	6
(Chile) P Capdeville (Brazil) L Kirche	1	1
(Argentina) F Bagnis (Argentina) D Schwartzman	6	6^{5}	[10]
(Slovakia) P Červenák (Germany) A Satschko	4	7^{7}	[5]
4	(Croatia) N Mektić (Croatia) A Veić	4	6	[10]
WC	(Argentina) L Arnold Ker (Argentina) M González	6	3	[6]
(Argentina) D Junqueira (Argentina) G Pella	6	6
WC	(Brazil) Andre Napolitano (Uruguay) Rodrigo Senattore	2	3
(Portugal) G Elias (Portugal) J Sousa	1	7^{9}	[10]
(Slovenia) B Kavčič (Croatia) F Škugor	6	6^{7}	[12]
(Germany) S Greul (Italy) A Motti	6	4	[10]
3	(Serbia) B Pašanski (Montenegro) G Tošić	3	6	[7]
(Argentina) F Argüello (Argentina) A Velotti	6	7
WC	(Bolivia) H Dellien (Uruguay) S Maresca	2	5
PR	(Austria) A Haider-Maurer (Germany) J Reister	4	6^{6}
2	(Argentina) G Durán (Uruguay) M Felder	6	7^{8}

Quarterfinals
1	(Uruguay) A Behar (Argentina) H Zeballos	7	7
(Argentina) F Bagnis (Argentina) D Schwartzman	5	5
4	(Croatia) N Mektić (Croatia) A Veić	w/o
(Argentina) D Junqueira (Argentina) G Pella
(Slovenia) B Kavčič (Croatia) F Škugor	6	6
(Germany) S Greul (Italy) A Motti	3	1
(Argentina) F Argüello (Argentina) A Velotti
2	(Argentina) G Durán (Uruguay) M Felder	w/o

Semifinals
1	(Uruguay) A Behar (Argentina) H Zeballos	6	2	[10]
4	(Croatia) N Mektić (Croatia) A Veić	4	6	[12]
(Slovenia) B Kavčič (Croatia) F Škugor	4	6	[11]
2	(Argentina) G Durán (Uruguay) M Felder	6	2	[9]

Final
4	(Croatia) N Mektić (Croatia) A Veić	6	5	[10]
(Slovenia) B Kavčič (Croatia) F Škugor	3	7	[7]
