= 2016 Uruguay Open – Doubles =

Doubles
- 2016 Uruguay Open

Final
- Champions: (Argentina) Andrés Molteni; (Argentina) Diego Schwartzman
- Runners-up: (Brazil) Fabiano de Paula; (Chile) Cristian Garín
- Score: Walkover

Events
Singles	Doubles
- Uruguay Open

Andrej Martin and Hans Podlipnik were the defending champions but only Podlipnik chose to defend his title, partnering Marcel Felder. Podlipnik lost in the quarterfinals to Andrés Molteni and Diego Schwartzman.

Molteni and Schwartzman won the title after Fabiano de Paula and Cristian Garín withdrew before the final.

== Seeds ==
1. (Argentina) Andrés Molteni / (Argentina) Diego Schwartzman (champions)
2. (Brazil) Fabrício Neis / (Brazil) Caio Zampieri (first round)
3. (Uruguay) Ariel Behar / (Chile) Nicolás Jarry (semifinals)
4. (Spain) Íñigo Cervantes / (Netherlands) Mark Vervoort (semifinals)

== Draw ==
Key

- Q = Qualifier
- WC = Wild card
- LL = Lucky loser
- Alt = Alternate
- ITF = ITF entry
- PR = Protected ranking
- SR = Special ranking
- SE = Special exempt
- JE = Junior exempt
- JR = Junior Accelerator Programme entrant
- CO = College Accelerator Programme entrant
- NG = Next Gen Accelerator Program entrant
- w/o = Walkover
- r = Retired
- d = Defaulted

First round

Quarterfinals

Semifinals

Final

1
- (Argentina) A Molteni
- (Argentina) D Schwartzman
6
6

- (Argentina) F Coria
- (Argentina) T Lipovšek Puches
2
2

1
- (Argentina) A Molteni
- (Argentina) D Schwartzman
6
6

- (Peru) S Galdós
- (Brazil) F Romboli
6
2
[10]

- (Uruguay) M Felder
- (Chile) H Podlipnik
3
3

- (Uruguay) M Felder
- (Chile) H Podlipnik
3
6
[12]

1
- (Argentina) A Molteni
- (Argentina) D Schwartzman
6
6

4
- (Spain) Í Cervantes
- (Netherlands) M Vervoort
6
6

4
- (Spain) Í Cervantes
- (Netherlands) M Vervoort
2
1

- (Chile) C Saavedra
- (Japan) K Uchida
3
0

4
- (Spain) Í Cervantes
- (Netherlands) M Vervoort
7^{8}
7

(Spain) N Almagro
(Brazil) E Russi Assumpção
3
6
[11]

(Spain) N Almagro
(Brazil) E Russi Assumpção
6^{6}
5

WC
- (Brazil) R Hocevar
- (Uruguay) S Maresca
6
3
[9]

1
- (Argentina) A Molteni
- (Argentina) D Schwartzman
w/o

- (Argentina) JP Paz
- (Argentina) A Velotti
6
6

- (Brazil) F de Paula
- (Chile) C Garín

WC
- (Uruguay) D Acosta
- (Uruguay) R Arús
3
1

- (Argentina) JP Paz
- (Argentina) A Velotti

Alt
- (Argentina) M Kestelboim
- (Argentina) F Mena
4
3

3
- (Uruguay) A Behar
- (Chile) N Jarry
w/o

3
- (Uruguay) A Behar
- (Chile) N Jarry
6
6

3
- (Uruguay) A Behar
- (Chile) N Jarry
7^{7}
2
[4]

WC
- (Brazil) P Sakamoto
- (Uruguay) N Xiviller
6
3
[4]

- (Brazil) F de Paula
- (Chile) C Garín
6^{5}
6
[10]

- (Brazil) P Bernardi
- (Austria) M Linzer
2
6
[10]

- (Brazil) P Bernardi
- (Austria) M Linzer
2
1

- (Brazil) F de Paula
- (Chile) C Garín
6
3
[10]

- (Brazil) F de Paula
- (Chile) C Garín
6
6

2
- (Brazil) F Neis
- (Brazil) C Zampieri
4
6
[6]
