= 2017 Uruguay Open =

- Date: 6–12 November
- Edition: 13th
- Surface: Clay
- Location: Montevideo, Uruguay

Champions

Singles
- (Uruguay) Pablo Cuevas

Doubles
- (Monaco) Romain Arneodo / (Brazil) Fernando Romboli
- Uruguay Open

The 2017 Uruguay Open was a professional tennis tournament played on clay courts. It was the thirteenth edition of the tournament which was part of the 2017 ATP Challenger Tour. It took place in Montevideo, Uruguay between November 6 and 12, 2017.

== Singles main-draw entrants ==
=== Seeds ===
Country	Player	Rank^{1}	Seed
URU	Pablo Cuevas	36	1
ARG	Guido Pella	64	2
ARG	Nicolás Kicker	82	3
BRA	Rogério Dutra Silva	95	4
ESP	Roberto Carballés Baena	101	5
ITA	Marco Cecchinato	102	6
CHI	Nicolás Jarry	116	7
ARG	Carlos Berlocq	120	8

- ^{1} Rankings are as of 30 October 2017.

=== Other entrants ===
The following players received wildcards into the singles main draw:

- (Uruguay) Martín Cuevas
- (Uruguay) Pablo Cuevas
- (Uruguay) Santiago Maresca
- (Brazil) João Pedro Sorgi

The following player received entry into the singles main draw using a protected ranking:

- (Colombia) Alejandro González

The following players received entry from the qualifying draw:

- (Argentina) Pedro Cachin
- (Argentina) Juan Pablo Ficovich
- (Dominican Republic) José Hernández-Fernández
- (Argentina) Juan Ignacio Londero

== Champions ==
=== Singles ===
- (Uruguay) Pablo Cuevas def. (Portugal) Gastão Elias 6–4, 6–3.

=== Doubles ===
- (Monaco) Romain Arneodo / (Brazil) Fernando Romboli def. (Uruguay) Ariel Behar / (Brazil) Fabiano de Paula 2–6, 6–4, [10–8].
