= 2013 Uruguay Open – Singles =

Singles
- 2013 Uruguay Open

Final
- Champions: (Brazil) Thomaz Bellucci
- Runners-up: (Argentina) Diego Sebastián Schwartzman
- Score: 6–4, 6–4

Events
Singles	Doubles
← 2012 ·	Uruguay Open	· 2014 →

Horacio Zeballos was the defending champion but decided not to participate.
Thomaz Bellucci won the title over Diego Sebastián Schwartzman

== Seeds ==
1. (Argentina) Leonardo Mayer (quarterfinals)
2. (Italy) Paolo Lorenzi (second round)
3. (Argentina) Diego Sebastián Schwartzman (final)
4. (Colombia) Alejandro González (first round)
5. (Brazil) Rogério Dutra da Silva (quarterfinals)
6. (Spain) Pere Riba (quarterfinals)
7. (Argentina) Martín Alund (semifinals)
8. ~~(Spain) Rubén Ramírez Hidalgo~~ (withdrew due to illness)
9. (Argentina) Facundo Bagnis (first round)

== Draw ==
=== Key ===
- Q = Qualifier
- WC = Wild card
- LL = Lucky loser
- Alt = Alternate
- SE = Special exempt
- PR = Protected ranking
- ITF = ITF entry
- JE = Junior exempt
- w/o = Walkover
- r = Retired
- d = Defaulted
- SR = Special ranking

=== Finals ===
Semifinals
7	(Argentina) Martín Alund	3	2
(Brazil) Thomaz Bellucci	6	6
3	(Argentina) Diego Schwartzman	6	6
SE	(Uruguay) Pablo Cuevas	2	2

Final
(Brazil) Thomaz Bellucci	6	6
3	(Argentina) Diego Schwartzman	4	4

=== Top half ===
First round
1	(Argentina) L Mayer	6	6
LL	(Argentina) M Trungelliti	4	4
(Croatia) K Mesaroš	3	6^{2}
Q	(Argentina) A Collarini	6	7^{7}
Q	(Brazil) T Monteiro	7	6
Q	(El Salvador) M Arévalo	5	1
WC	(Uruguay) Rodrigo Senattore	1	1
7	(Argentina) M Alund	6	6
4	(Colombia) A González	2	4
(Brazil) T Bellucci	6	6
(Argentina) G Andreozzi	7	6
(Chile) P Capdeville	5	1
(Argentina) F Argüello	6	6
WC	(Uruguay) M Cuevas	1	3
WC	(Uruguay) A Behar	6	1	3
6	(Spain) P Riba	4	6	6

Second round
1	(Argentina) L Mayer	7^{7}	6
Q	(Argentina) A Collarini	6^{4}	3
Q	(Brazil) T Monteiro	4	1
7	(Argentina) M Alund	6	6
(Brazil) T Bellucci	6	3	6
(Argentina) G Andreozzi	4	6	1
(Argentina) F Argüello	7^{8}	2	4
6	(Spain) P Riba	6^{6}	6	6

Quarterfinals
1	(Argentina) L Mayer	2	5
7	(Argentina) M Alund	6	7
(Brazil) T Bellucci	6	6
6	(Spain) P Riba	4	1

Semifinals
7	(Argentina) M Alund	3	2
(Brazil) T Bellucci	6	6

=== Bottom half ===
First round
5	(Brazil) R Dutra da Silva	6	6
(Dominican Republic) V Estrella	2	4
(Brazil) A Ghem	6	6
WC	(Brazil) M Zormann	1	3
(Argentina) A Velotti	4	6	3
(Croatia) A Veić	6	2	2^{r}
PR	(Argentina) E Schwank	1	2
3	(Argentina) D Schwartzman	6	6
9	(Argentina) F Bagnis	3	6	2
(Argentina) R Olivo	6	3	6
(Brazil) G Clezar	6^{3}	3
(Portugal) G Elias	7^{7}	6
SE	(Uruguay) P Cuevas	6	6
(Argentina) M González	4	0
Q	(Chile) G Lama	2	2
2	(Italy) P Lorenzi	6	6

Second round
5	(Brazil) R Dutra da Silva	6	1	6
(Brazil) A Ghem	4	6	3
(Argentina) A Velotti	3	2
3	(Argentina) D Schwartzman	6	6
(Argentina) R Olivo	7	6
(Portugal) G Elias	5	3
SE	(Uruguay) P Cuevas	5	6	6
2	(Italy) P Lorenzi	7	4	3

Quarterfinals
5	(Brazil) R Dutra da Silva	7^{7}	2	1
3	(Argentina) D Schwartzman	6^{5}	6	6
(Argentina) R Olivo	4	6^{5}
SE	(Uruguay) P Cuevas	6	7^{7}

Semifinals
3	(Argentina) D Schwartzman	6	6
SE	(Uruguay) P Cuevas	2	2
