= 2011 Copa Petrobras Montevideo =

- Date: 14–20 November
- Edition: 11th
- Location: Montevideo, Uruguay

Champions

Singles
- (Argentina) Carlos Berlocq

Doubles
- (Serbia) Nikola Ćirić / (Montenegro) Goran Tošić
- Copa Petrobras Montevideo

The 2011 Copa Petrobras Montevideo was a professional tennis tournament played on clay courts. It was the eleventh edition of the tournament which was part of the 2011 ATP Challenger Tour. It took place in Montevideo, Uruguay between 14 and 20 November 2011.

== ATP entrants ==
=== Seeds ===
Country	Player	Rank^{1}	Seed
ARG	Carlos Berlocq	65	1
ARG	Leonardo Mayer	81	2
ARG	Diego Junqueira	91	3
BRA	João Souza	101	4
BRA	Rogério Dutra da Silva	122	5
ARG	Máximo González	131	6
USA	Wayne Odesnik	132	7
ITA	Alessandro Giannessi	136	8

- ^{1} Rankings are as of November 7, 2011.

=== Other entrants ===
The following players received wildcards into the singles main draw:

- (Uruguay) Martín Cuevas
- (Brazil) Tiago Fernandes
- (Ecuador) Diego Hidalgo
- (Chile) Nicolás Massú

The following players received entry from the qualifying draw:

- (Argentina) Alejandro Fabbri
- (Argentina) Renzo Olivo
- (Argentina) Diego Schwartzman
- (Argentina) Agustín Velotti

== Champions ==
=== Singles ===
(Argentina) Carlos Berlocq def. (Argentina) Máximo González, 6–2, 7–5

=== Doubles ===
(Serbia) Nikola Ćirić / (Montenegro) Goran Tošić def. (Uruguay) Marcel Felder / (Argentina) Diego Schwartzman, 7–6^{(7–5)}, 7–6^{(7–4)}
