= 2009 Copa Petrobras Montevideo – Doubles =

Doubles
- 2009 Copa Petrobras Montevideo

Final
- Champions: (Argentina) Juan Pablo Brzezicki (Spain) David Marrero
- Runners-up: (Uruguay) Martín Cuevas (Uruguay) Pablo Cuevas
- Score: 6–4, 6–4

Events
Singles	Doubles
← 2008 ·	Copa Petrobras Montevideo	· 2010 →

Franco Ferreiro and Flávio Saretta were the defending champions, but they didn't start this year.
Juan Pablo Brzezicki and David Marrero defeated Martín Cuevas and Pablo Cuevas 6–4, 6–4 in the final.

== Seeds ==
1. (Argentina) Brian Dabul / (Argentina) Eduardo Schwank (first round)
2. (Brazil) Ricardo Hocevar / (Brazil) João Souza (first round)
3. (Argentina) Diego Álvarez / (Argentina) Diego Junqueira (quarterfinals)
4. (Paraguay) Ramón Delgado / (Argentina) Sebastián Prieto (semifinals)

== Draw ==
=== Key ===
- Q = Qualifier
- WC = Wild card
- LL = Lucky loser
- Alt = Alternate
- SE = Special exempt
- PR = Protected ranking
- ITF = ITF entry
- JE = Junior exempt
- w/o = Walkover
- r = Retired
- d = Defaulted
- SR = Special ranking

=== Draw ===
First round
1	(Argentina) B Dabul (Argentina) E Schwank	3	3
(Argentina) JP Brzezicki (Spain) D Marrero	6	6
WC	(Uruguay) Juan-Manuel Camilloni (Uruguay) Joaquín Rodríguez	3	0
(United States) A Bogomolov Jr. (Canada) P Polansky	6	6
4	(Paraguay) R Delgado (Argentina) S Prieto	6	6
WC	(Ecuador) D Hidalgo (Ecuador) N Lapentti	4	4
(Spain) C Poch-Gradin (Spain) P Santos	7	6
(Brazil) M Demoliner (Portugal) L Tavares	6^{3}	3
(Argentina) J-M Aranguren (Argentina) Leandro Migani	4	4
WC	(Uruguay) M Cuevas (Uruguay) P Cuevas	6	6
(Chile) P Capdeville (Chile) N Massú	4	1
3	(Argentina) D Álvarez (Argentina) D Junqueira	6	6
(Spain) D Muñoz-De La Nava (France) L Recouderc	6^{0}	6	[6]
(Argentina) M Alund (Argentina) Facundo Bagnis	7	4	[10]
(Slovenia) B Kavčič (Croatia) F Škugor	6	6
2	(Brazil) R Hocevar (Brazil) J Souza	2	0

Quarterfinals
(Argentina) JP Brzezicki (Spain) D Marrero	6	7
(United States) A Bogomolov Jr. (Canada) P Polansky	2	6^{3}
4	(Paraguay) R Delgado (Argentina) S Prieto	4	6	[10]
(Spain) C Poch-Gradin (Spain) P Santos	6	0	[3]
WC	(Uruguay) M Cuevas (Uruguay) P Cuevas	6	6^{2}	[10]
3	(Argentina) D Álvarez (Argentina) D Junqueira	3	7	[3]
(Argentina) M Alund (Argentina) F Bagnis	1	1
(Slovenia) B Kavčič (Croatia) F Škugor	6	6

Semifinals
(Argentina) JP Brzezicki (Spain) D Marrero	6	6
4	(Paraguay) R Delgado (Argentina) S Prieto	3	3
WC	(Uruguay) M Cuevas (Uruguay) P Cuevas
(Slovenia) B Kavčič (Croatia) F Škugor	w/o

Finals
(Argentina) JP Brzezicki (Spain) D Marrero	6	6
WC	(Uruguay) M Cuevas (Uruguay) P Cuevas	4	4
