= 2018 Uruguay Open =

- Date: 5–11 November
- Edition: 14th
- Surface: Clay
- Location: Montevideo, Uruguay

Champions

Singles
- (Argentina) Guido Pella

Doubles
- (Argentina) Guido Andreozzi / (Argentina) Guillermo Durán
- Uruguay Open

The 2018 Uruguay Open was a professional tennis tournament played on clay courts. It was the fourteenth edition of the tournament which was part of the 2018 ATP Challenger Tour. It took place at the Carrasco Lawn Tennis Club in Montevideo, Uruguay between November 5 and 11, 2018.

== Singles main-draw entrants ==
=== Seeds ===
| Country | Player | Rank^{1} | Seed |
|---|---|---|---|
| URU | Pablo Cuevas | 65 | 1 |
| ARG | Guido Pella | 66 | 2 |
| ARG | Guido Andreozzi | 97 | 3 |
| ESP | Pablo Andújar | 103 | 4 |
| BRA | Thiago Monteiro | 114 | 5 |
| BOL | Hugo Dellien | 115 | 6 |
| ITA | Paolo Lorenzi | 116 | 7 |
| ARG | Juan Ignacio Londero | 119 | 8 |

- ^{1} Rankings are as of 29 October 2018.

=== Other entrants ===
The following players received wildcards into the singles main draw:

- (Uruguay) Martín Cuevas
- (Uruguay) Francisco Llanes
- (Brazil) Thiago Seyboth Wild
- (Spain) Carlos Taberner

The following player received entry into the singles main draw as an alternate:

- (Argentina) Facundo Argüello

The following players received entry from the qualifying draw:

- (Argentina) Federico Coria
- (Argentina) Facundo Díaz Acosta
- (Argentina) Juan Ignacio Galarza
- (Bulgaria) Dimitar Kuzmanov

== Champions ==
=== Singles ===
- (Argentina) Guido Pella def. (Argentina) Carlos Berlocq 6–3, 3–6, 6–1.

=== Doubles ===
- (Argentina) Guido Andreozzi / (Argentina) Guillermo Durán def. (Argentina) Facundo Bagnis / (Argentina) Andrés Molteni 7–6^{(7–5)}, 6–4.
