= 2012 Uruguay Open – Singles =

Singles
- 2012 Uruguay Open

Final
- Champions: (Argentina) Horacio Zeballos
- Runners-up: (Germany) Julian Reister
- Score: 6–3, 6–2

Events
Singles	Doubles
← 2011 ·	Uruguay Open	· 2013 →

Carlos Berlocq was the defending champion but decided not to participate.
Horacio Zeballos won the title, defeating Julian Reister 6–3, 6–2 in the final.

== Seeds ==
1. (Portugal) João Sousa (second round)
2. (Austria) Andreas Haider-Maurer (first round)
3. (France) Guillaume Rufin (withdrew)
4. (Slovenia) Blaž Kavčič (second round)
5. (Argentina) Guido Pella (first round)
6. (Romania) Adrian Ungur (semifinals)
7. (Argentina) Horacio Zeballos (champion)
8. (Netherlands) Thiemo de Bakker (first round)

== Draw ==
=== Key ===
- Q = Qualifier
- WC = Wild card
- LL = Lucky loser
- Alt = Alternate
- SE = Special exempt
- PR = Protected ranking
- ITF = ITF entry
- JE = Junior exempt
- w/o = Walkover
- r = Retired
- d = Defaulted
- SR = Special ranking

=== Finals ===
Semifinals
PR	(Germany) Julian Reister	6	6
(Argentina) Agustín Velotti	1	1
7	(Argentina) Horacio Zeballos	6	6
6	(Romania) Adrian Ungur	1	3

Final
PR	(Germany) Julian Reister	3	2
7	(Argentina) Horacio Zeballos	6	6

=== Top half ===
First round
1	(Portugal) J Sousa	7^{7}
Q	(Argentina) D Junqueira	6^{1}	r
(Argentina) F Argüello	4	2
PR	(Germany) J Reister	6	6
WC	(Serbia) M Djokovic	3	7	6^{6}
WC	(Argentina) M González	6	5	7^{8}
(Germany) S Greul	6	4	6
5	(Argentina) G Pella	1	6	2
LL	(Netherlands) A van der Duim	1	1
(Argentina) A Velotti	6	6
Alt	(Netherlands) B Westerhof	0	1
SE	(Argentina) D Schwartzman	6	6
(Argentina) G Andreozzi	5	6	4
Q	(Belgium) Arthur De Greef	7	3	6
(Croatia) A Veić	6	6
8	(Netherlands) T de Bakker	2	2

Second round
1	(Portugal) J Sousa	6^{3}	1
PR	(Germany) J Reister	7^{7}	6
WC	(Argentina) M González	7^{7}	6
(Germany) S Greul	6^{2}	3
(Argentina) A Velotti	6	6
SE	(Argentina) D Schwartzman	1	2
Q	(Belgium) A De Greef	3	2
(Croatia) A Veić	6	6

Quarterfinals
PR	(Germany) J Reister	6	6
WC	(Argentina) M González	3	3
(Argentina) A Velotti	6	1	7^{7}
(Croatia) A Veić	4	6	6^{2}

Semifinals
PR	(Germany) J Reister	6	6
(Argentina) A Velotti	1	1

=== Bottom half ===
First round
7	(Argentina) H Zeballos	6	4	6
(Portugal) G Elias	4	6	4
(Chile) P Capdeville	7	6
Q	(Bosnia and Herzegovina) T Brkić	5	3
(Brazil) L Kirche	6^{4}	4
(Serbia) B Pašanski	7^{7}	6
(Argentina) F Bagnis	6^{3}	2
4	(Slovenia) B Kavčič	7^{7}	6
6	(Romania) A Ungur	6	6
(Brazil) R Dutra da Silva	3	2
(Slovakia) P Červenák	7	6
WC	(Uruguay) A Behar	5	1
Q	(France) S Robert	6	7^{7}
(Brazil) G Clezar	1	6^{5}
WC	(Uruguay) M Felder	1	6	6
2	(Austria) A Haider-Maurer	6	4	2

Second round
7	(Argentina) H Zeballos	7^{7}	6
(Chile) P Capdeville	6^{5}	3
(Serbia) B Pašanski	6	7
4	(Slovenia) B Kavčič	3	5
6	(Romania) A Ungur	6	6
(Slovakia) P Červenák	3	4
Q	(France) S Robert	6	3	2
WC	(Uruguay) M Felder	2	6	6

Quarterfinals
7	(Argentina) H Zeballos	6	6
(Serbia) B Pašanski	3	3
6	(Romania) A Ungur	6	6
WC	(Uruguay) M Felder	2	3

Semifinals
7	(Argentina) H Zeballos	6	6
6	(Romania) A Ungur	1	3
