= 2015 Uruguay Open =

- Date: 16 November – 22 November
- Edition: 11th
- Surface: Clay
- Location: Montevideo, Uruguay

Champions

Singles
- (Argentina) Guido Pella

Doubles
- (Slovakia) Andrej Martin / (Chile) Hans Podlipnik Castillo
- Uruguay Open

The 2015 Uruguay Open is a professional tennis tournament played on clay courts. It is the eleventh edition of the tournament, and it is part of the 2015 ATP Challenger Tour. It took place in Montevideo, Uruguay between November 16 and November 22, 2015.

== Singles main-draw entrants ==
=== Seeds ===
Country	Player	Rank^{1}	Seed
URU	Pablo Cuevas	40	1
ARG	Diego Schwartzman	72	2
ARG	Guido Pella	73	3
ESP	Íñigo Cervantes	105	4
GBR	Kyle Edmund	110	5
ARG	Facundo Argüello	124	6
ARG	Carlos Berlocq	127	7
ARG	Horacio Zeballos	134	8

- ^{1} Rankings are as of November 9, 2015.

=== Other entrants ===
The following players received wildcards into the singles main draw:

- (Uruguay) Dario Acosta
- (Uruguay) Martín Cuevas
- (Uruguay) Pablo Cuevas
- (Uruguay) Santiago Maresca

The following players received entry from the qualifying draw:

- (Argentina) Andrea Collarini
- (Argentina) Guillermo Durán
- (Argentina) Juan Ignacio Galarza
- (Brazil) Orlando Luz

== Champions ==
=== Singles ===
- (Argentina) Guido Pella def. (Spain) Íñigo Cervantes 7–5, 2–6, 6–4

=== Doubles ===
- (Slovakia) Andrej Martin / (Chile) Hans Podlipnik Castillo def. (Brazil) Marcelo Demoliner / (Portugal) Gastão Elias 6–4, 3–6, [10–6]
