= 2017 Uruguay Open – Singles =

Singles
- 2017 Uruguay Open

Final
- Champion: (Uruguay) Pablo Cuevas
- Runner-up: (Portugal) Gastão Elias
- Score: 6–4, 6–3

Events
| Singles | Doubles |
- Uruguay Open

Diego Schwartzman was the defending champion but chose not to defend his title.

Pablo Cuevas won the title after defeating Gastão Elias 6–4, 6–3 in the final.

== Seeds ==
1. (Uruguay) Pablo Cuevas (champion)
2. (Argentina) Guido Pella (quarterfinals)
3. (Argentina) Nicolás Kicker (semifinals)
4. (Brazil) Rogério Dutra Silva (quarterfinals)
5. (Spain) Roberto Carballés Baena (second round)
6. (Italy) Marco Cecchinato (first round)
7. (Chile) Nicolás Jarry (second round)
8. (Argentina) Carlos Berlocq (second round)

== Draw ==
Key

- Q = Qualifier
- WC = Wild card
- LL = Lucky loser
- Alt = Alternate
- ITF = ITF entry
- PR = Protected ranking
- SR = Special ranking
- SE = Special exempt
- JE = Junior exempt
- JR = Junior Accelerator Programme entrant
- CO = College Accelerator Programme entrant
- NG = Next Gen Accelerator Program entrant
- w/o = Walkover
- r = Retired
- d = Defaulted

=== Finals ===
Semifinals
1/WC | (Uruguay) Pablo Cuevas | 7 | 6
3 | (Argentina) Nicolás Kicker | 5 | 3
(Portugal) João Domingues | 5 | 3
(Portugal) Gastão Elias | 7 | 6

Final
1/WC | (Uruguay) Pablo Cuevas | 6 | 6
(Portugal) Gastão Elias | 4 | 3

=== Top half ===
First round
1/WC | (Uruguay) P Cuevas | 4 | 6 | 6
Q | (Argentina) JP Ficovich | 6 | 2 | 4
(Argentina) A Collarini | 1 | 4
Q | (Dominican Republic) J Hernández-Fernández | 6 | 6
(Argentina) F Bagnis | 7 | 5 | 6
(Argentina) G Andreozzi | 5 | 7 | 1
WC | (Uruguay) M Cuevas | 1 | 6 | 3
8 | (Argentina) C Berlocq | 6 | 3 | 6
3 | (Argentina) N Kicker | 6 | 6
(Austria) M Linzer | 2 | 2
(Hungary) A Balázs | 6^{6} | 6^{2}
(Brazil) G Clezar | 7^{8} | 7^{7}
(El Salvador) M Arévalo | 7 | 6^{6} | 6
(Brazil) J Souza | 5 | 7^{8} | 3
(Argentina) M González | 1 | 6 | 1
5 | (Spain) R Carballés Baena | 6 | 2 | 6

Second round
1/WC | (Uruguay) P Cuevas | 6 | 6
Q | (Dominican Republic) J Hernández-Fernández | 3 | 0
(Argentina) F Bagnis | 4 | 6 | 7
8 | (Argentina) C Berlocq | 6 | 3 | 5
3 | (Argentina) N Kicker | 6 | 6
(Brazil) G Clezar | 3 | 1
(El Salvador) M Arévalo | 6 | 4 | 6
5 | (Spain) R Carballés Baena | 4 | 6 | 3

Quarterfinals
1/WC | (Uruguay) P Cuevas | 6 | 2 | 6
(Argentina) F Bagnis | 3 | 6 | 3
3 | (Argentina) N Kicker | 6 | 6
(El Salvador) M Arévalo | 4 | 3

Semifinals
1/WC | (Uruguay) P Cuevas | 7 | 6
3 | (Argentina) N Kicker | 5 | 3

=== Bottom half ===
First round
7 | (Chile) N Jarry | 6 | 6
Q | (Argentina) JI Londero | 1 | 2
WC | (Brazil) JP Sorgi | 6 | 4 | 2
(Portugal) J Domingues | 4 | 6 | 6
(Slovenia) B Rola | 6 | 6
WC | (Uruguay) S Maresca | 2 | 1
(Portugal) G Oliveira | 3 | 3
4 | (Brazil) R Dutra Silva | 6 | 6
6 | (Italy) M Cecchinato | 6 | 3 | 6^{5}
PR | (Colombia) A González | 4 | 6 | 7^{7}
(Portugal) G Elias | 6 | 1 | 6
(Bolivia) H Dellien | 3 | 6 | 1
(Norway) C Ruud | 2 | 4
(Argentina) F Coria | 6 | 6
Q | (Argentina) P Cachin | 2 | 2
2 | (Argentina) G Pella | 6 | 6

Second round
7 | (Chile) N Jarry | 4 | 1
(Portugal) J Domingues | 6 | 6
(Slovenia) B Rola | 5 | 2
4 | (Brazil) R Dutra Silva | 7 | 6
PR | (Colombia) A González | 6 | 2 | 3
(Portugal) G Elias | 1 | 6 | 6
(Argentina) F Coria | 3 | 3
2 | (Argentina) G Pella | 6 | 6

Quarterfinals
(Portugal) J Domingues | 7^{7} | 2 | 6
4 | (Brazil) R Dutra Silva | 6^{2} | 6 | 2
(Portugal) G Elias | 4 | 6 | 6
2 | (Argentina) G Pella | 6 | 4 | 2

Semifinals
(Portugal) J Domingues | 5 | 3
(Portugal) G Elias | 7 | 6
