= 2010 Copa Petrobras Montevideo =

- Date: 27 September – 3 October
- Edition: 6th
- Location: Montevideo, Uruguay

Champions

Singles
- (Argentina) Máximo González

Doubles
- (Argentina) Carlos Berlocq / (Argentina) Brian Dabul
- Copa Petrobras Montevideo

The 2010 Copa Petrobras Montevideo was a professional tennis tournament played on outdoor red clay courts. It was the sixth edition of the tournament which is part of the 2010 ATP Challenger Tour. It took place in Montevideo, Uruguay between 27 September and 3 October 2010.

== ATP entrants ==
=== Seeds ===
Nationality	Player	Ranking*	Seeding
URU	Pablo Cuevas	70	1
ARG	Brian Dabul	95	2
ARG	Carlos Berlocq	98	3
POR	Rui Machado	124	4
CHI	Nicolás Massú	128	5
ESP	Santiago Ventura	139	6
ARG	Federico del Bonis	148	7
ARG	Diego Junqueira	189	8

- Rankings are as of September 20, 2010.

=== Other entrants ===
The following players received wildcards into the singles main draw:

- (Uruguay) Ariel Behar
- (Brazil) Guilherme Clézar
- (Uruguay) Martín Cuevas
- (Argentina) Agustín Velotti

The following players received entry from the qualifying draw:

- (Brazil) Rafael Camilo
- (Argentina) Guillermo Durán
- (Argentina) Jonathan Gonzalia
- (Argentina) Agustín Picco

== Champions ==
=== Singles ===
(Argentina) Máximo González def. (Uruguay) Pablo Cuevas, 1–6, 6–3, 6–4

=== Doubles ===
(Argentina) Carlos Berlocq / (Argentina) Brian Dabul def. (Argentina) Máximo González / (Argentina) Sebastián Prieto, 7–5, 6–3
