= 2009 Copa Petrobras Montevideo – Singles =

Singles
- 2009 Copa Petrobras Montevideo

Final
- Champion: (Uruguay) Pablo Cuevas
- Runner-up: (Ecuador) Nicolás Lapentti
- Score: 7–5, 6–1

Events
Singles	Doubles
- Copa Petrobras Montevideo

Peter Luczak chose not to defend his 2008 title. Pablo Cuevas became the new champion, after beating Nicolás Lapentti 7–5, 6–1 in the final.

== Seeds ==
1. (Uruguay) Pablo Cuevas (champion)
2. (Argentina) Máximo González (quarterfinals)
3. (Chile) Paul Capdeville (first round)
4. (Chile) Nicolás Massú (second round)
5. (Argentina) Juan Ignacio Chela (semifinals)
6. (Spain) Santiago Ventura (first round, retired due to right abductor injury)
7. (Spain) Rubén Ramírez Hidalgo (first round)
8. (France) Laurent Recouderc (first round)

== Draw ==
Key

- Q = Qualifier
- WC = Wild card
- LL = Lucky loser
- Alt = Alternate
- ITF = ITF entry
- PR = Protected ranking
- SR = Special ranking
- SE = Special exempt
- JE = Junior exempt
- JR = Junior Accelerator Programme entrant
- CO = College Accelerator Programme entrant
- NG = Next Gen Accelerator Program entrant
- w/o = Walkover
- r = Retired
- d = Defaulted

=== Final four ===
Semifinals
1	(Uruguay) Pablo Cuevas	6	6
SE	(Argentina) Gastón Gaudio	2	4
(Ecuador) Nicolás Lapentti	6	6^{5}	7
5	(Argentina) Juan Ignacio Chela	2	7	6^{2}

Final
1	(Uruguay) Pablo Cuevas	7	6
(Ecuador) Nicolás Lapentti	5	1

=== Top half ===
First round
1	(Uruguay) P Cuevas	6	6
(Canada) P Polansky	1	3
(Spain) D Muñoz de la Nava	2	3
(Spain) P Santos	6	6
(Argentina) S Roitman	0	3
Q	(Portugal) L Tavares	6	6
WC	(Paraguay) R Delgado	6
6	(Spain) S Ventura	3	r
4	(Chile) N Massú	4	6	7
(Brazil) J Souza	6	3	6^{5}
SE	(Argentina) G Gaudio	6	6
(Argentina) B Dabul	3	4
(Brazil) R Hocevar	2	6^{5}
Q	(Argentina) J-M Aranguren	6	7
WC	(Peru) L Horna	7	3	6
7	(Spain) R Ramírez Hidalgo	5	6	4

Second round
1	(Uruguay) P Cuevas	4
(Spain) P Santos	4	r
Q	(Portugal) L Tavares	6	6
WC	(Paraguay) R Delgado	2	4
4	(Chile) N Massú	6	3	4
SE	(Argentina) G Gaudio	2	6	6
Q	(Argentina) J-M Aranguren	6^{5}	4
WC	(Peru) L Horna	7	6

Quarterfinals
1	(Uruguay) P Cuevas	6	7
Q	(Portugal) L Tavares	4	5
SE	(Argentina) G Gaudio	6	6
WC	(Peru) L Horna	3	4

Semifinals
1	(Uruguay) P Cuevas	6	6
SE	(Argentina) G Gaudio	2	4

=== Bottom half ===
First round
8	(France) L Recouderc	3	4
(Argentina) M Zabaleta	6	6
(Argentina) JP Brzezicki	6	7
Q	(Argentina) M Alund	1	6^{6}
(Ecuador) N Lapentti	6	6
(Argentina) D Junqueira	1	4
(Argentina) E Schwank	6	6
3	(Chile) P Capdeville	3	4
5	(Argentina) JI Chela	6	6
ALT	(Spain) D Marrero	2	0
WC	(Argentina) M Puerta	6	7
(Slovenia) B Kavčič	4	6^{3}
Q	(Argentina) Leandro Migani	7	4	7
(United States) A Bogomolov Jr.	6^{6}	6	5
WC	(Uruguay) M Cuevas	3	3
2	(Argentina) M González	6	6

Second round
(Argentina) M Zabaleta	1	3
(Argentina) JP Brzezicki	6	6
(Ecuador) N Lapentti	6	6
(Argentina) E Schwank	2	4
5	(Argentina) JI Chela	6	7
WC	(Argentina) M Puerta	1	6^{9}
Q	(Argentina) L Migani	2	6	5
2	(Argentina) M González	6	2	7

Quarterfinals
(Argentina) JP Brzezicki	2	4
(Ecuador) N Lapentti	6	6
5	(Argentina) JI Chela	6	6
2	(Argentina) M González	1	0

Semifinals
(Ecuador) N Lapentti	6	6^{5}	7
5	(Argentina) JI Chela	2	7	6^{2}
