= 2014 Uruguay Open =

- Date: 15 November – 23 November
- Edition: 10th
- Surface: Clay
- Location: Montevideo, Uruguay

Champions

Singles
- (Uruguay) Pablo Cuevas

Doubles
- (Uruguay) Martín Cuevas / (Uruguay) Pablo Cuevas
- Uruguay Open

The 2014 Uruguay Open was a professional tennis tournament played on clay courts. It was the tenth edition of the tournament which is part of the 2014 ATP Challenger Tour. It took place in Montevideo, Uruguay between November 15 and November 23, 2014.

== Singles main-draw entrants ==
=== Seeds ===
Country	Player	Rank^{1}	Seed
URU	Pablo Cuevas	35	1
ESP	Pere Riba	117	2
ARG	Facundo Argüello	150	3
CHI	Gonzalo Lama	207	4
CHI	Nicolás Jarry	228	5
ESP	Jordi Samper-Montaña	244	6
ARG	Andrés Molteni	259	7
ARG	Pedro Cachin	267	8

- ^{1} Rankings are as of November 10, 2014.

=== Other entrants ===
The following players received wildcards into the singles main draw:

- (Uruguay) Pablo Cuevas
- (Uruguay) Rodrigo Senattore
- (Uruguay) Santiago Maresca
- (Uruguay) Ariel Behar

The following players received entry from the qualifying draw:

- (Argentina) Manuel Barros
- (Argentina) Luciano Doria
- (Canada) David Volfson
- (Argentina) Matías Buchhass

== Champions ==
=== Singles ===
- (Uruguay) Pablo Cuevas def. (Bolivia) Hugo Dellien, 6–2, 6–4

=== Doubles ===
- (Uruguay) Martín Cuevas / (Uruguay) Pablo Cuevas def. (Chile) Nicolás Jarry / (Chile) Gonzalo Lama, 6–2, 6–4
