= 2013 Uruguay Open =

- Date: 28 October – 3 November
- Edition: 9th
- Surface: Clay
- Location: Montevideo, Uruguay

Champions

Singles
- (Brazil) Thomaz Bellucci

Doubles
- (Uruguay) Martín Cuevas / (Uruguay) Pablo Cuevas
- Uruguay Open

The 2013 Uruguay Open was a professional tennis tournament played on clay courts. It was the ninth edition of the tournament, which was part of the 2013 ATP Challenger Tour. It took place in Montevideo, Uruguay between October 28 and November 3, 2012.

== Singles main-draw entrants ==
=== Seeds ===
Country	Player	Rank^{1}	Seed
ARG	Leonardo Mayer	82	1
ITA	Paolo Lorenzi	86	2
ARG	Diego Sebastián Schwartzman	105	3
COL	Alejandro González	108	4
BRA	Rogério Dutra da Silva	127	5
ESP	Pere Riba	133	6
ARG	Martín Alund	133	7
~~ESP~~	~~Rubén Ramírez Hidalgo~~	~~137~~	~~8~~
ARG	Facundo Bagnis	139	9

- ^{1} Rankings are as of October 21, 2012.

=== Other entrants ===
The following players received wildcards into the singles main draw:

- (Uruguay) Rodrigo Senattore
- (Uruguay) Martín Cuevas
- (Uruguay) Ariel Behar
- (Brazil) Marcelo Zormann da Silva

The following players received entry into the singles main draw via protected ranking:

- (Argentina) Eduardo Schwank

The following players received entry as a special exempt into the singles main draw:

- (Uruguay) Pablo Cuevas

The following players received entry from the qualifying draw:

- (Argentina) Andrea Collarini
- (Brazil) Thiago Monteiro
- (El Salvador) Marcelo Arévalo
- (Chile) Gonzalo Lama

The following players received entry into the singles main draw as a lucky loser:

- (Argentina) Marco Trungelliti

== Champions ==
=== Singles ===
- (Brazil) Thomaz Bellucci def. (Argentina) Diego Sebastián Schwartzman 6–4, 6–4

=== Doubles ===
- (Uruguay) Martín Cuevas / (Uruguay) Pablo Cuevas def. (Brazil) André Ghem / (Brazil) Rogério Dutra da Silva Walkover
