= 2019 Uruguay Open =

Tennis tournament

- Date: 4–10 November
- Edition: 15th
- Surface: Clay
- Location: Montevideo, Uruguay

Champions

Singles
- (Spain) Jaume Munar

Doubles
- (Argentina) Facundo Bagnis / (Argentina) Andrés Molteni
- Uruguay Open

The 2019 Uruguay Open was a professional tennis tournament played on clay courts. It was the fifteenth edition of the tournament which was part of the 2019 ATP Challenger Tour. It took place at the Carrasco Lawn Tennis Club in Montevideo, Uruguay between November 4 and 10, 2019.

== Singles main-draw entrants ==
=== Seeds ===
Country	Player	Rank^{1}	Seed
URU	Pablo Cuevas	44	1
BOL	Hugo Dellien	76	2
ARG	Federico Delbonis	79	3
BRA	Thiago Monteiro	89	4
ESP	Jaume Munar	98	5
SVK	Andrej Martin	115	6
ARG	Federico Coria	121	7
ARG	Facundo Bagnis	138	8
PER	Juan Pablo Varillas	155	9
ESP	Mario Vilella Martínez	179	10
SVK	Jozef Kovalík	180	11
GER	Yannick Hanfmann	183	12
BRA	João Menezes	194	13
POR	João Domingues	196	14
ARG	Facundo Mena	200	15
ARG	Andrea Collarini	204	16

- ^{1} Rankings are as of 28 October 2019.

=== Other entrants ===
The following players received wildcards into the singles main draw:

- (Argentina) Juan Manuel Cerúndolo
- (Uruguay) Pablo Cuevas
- (Argentina) Facundo Díaz Acosta
- (Uruguay) Francisco Llanes
- (Uruguay) Franco Roncadelli

The following players received entry into the singles main draw as alternates:

- (Argentina) Sebastián Báez
- (Brazil) Rafael Matos

The following players received entry from the qualifying draw:

- (Peru) Mauricio Echazú
- (Bolivia) Federico Zeballos

The following player received entry as a lucky loser:

- (Bolivia) Boris Arias

== Champions ==
=== Singles ===
- (Spain) Jaume Munar def. (Argentina) Federico Delbonis 7–5, 6–2.

=== Doubles ===
- (Argentina) Facundo Bagnis / (Argentina) Andrés Molteni def. (Brazil) Orlando Luz / (Brazil) Rafael Matos 6–4, 5–7, [12–10].
