= 2014 Uruguay Open – Doubles =

Doubles
- 2014 Uruguay Open

Final
- Champions: (Uruguay) Martín Cuevas; (Uruguay) Pablo Cuevas
- Runners-up: (Chile) Nicolás Jarry; (Chile) Gonzalo Lama
- Score: 6–2, 6–4

Events
Singles	Doubles
- Uruguay Open

Martín Cuevas and Pablo Cuevas were the defending champions and successfully defended their title, defeating Nicolás Jarry and Gonzalo Lama in the final, 6–2, 6–4.

== Seeds ==
1. (Uruguay) Martín Cuevas / (Uruguay) Pablo Cuevas (champions)
2. (Argentina) Facundo Argüello / (Argentina) Tomás Lipovšek Puches (quarterfinals)
3. (Bolivia) Hugo Dellien / (Argentina) Marco Trungelliti (first round)
4. (Argentina) Nicolás Kicker / (Argentina) Renzo Olivo (quarterfinals)

== Draw ==
Key

- Q = Qualifier
- WC = Wild card
- LL = Lucky loser
- Alt = Alternate
- ITF = ITF entry
- PR = Protected ranking
- SR = Special ranking
- SE = Special exempt
- JE = Junior exempt
- JR = Junior Accelerator Programme entrant
- CO = College Accelerator Programme entrant
- NG = Next Gen Accelerator Program entrant
- w/o = Walkover
- r = Retired
- d = Defaulted

First round

Quarterfinals

Semifinals

Final

1
- (Uruguay) M Cuevas
- (Uruguay) P Cuevas
6
6

- (Argentina) F Coria
- (Brazil) F Neis
3
3

1
- (Uruguay) M Cuevas
- (Uruguay) P Cuevas
6
6

WC
(Uruguay) S Maresca
(Uruguay) Rodrigo Senattore
6
6

WC
(Uruguay) S Maresca
(Uruguay) R Senattore
4
2

(Ecuador) Galo Barrezueta
(Argentina) Tomás Iriarte
3
1

1
- (Uruguay) M Cuevas
- (Uruguay) P Cuevas
6^{5}
6
[10]

4
- (Argentina) N Kicker
- (Argentina) R Olivo
6
7^{7}

- (Brazil) W Leite
- (Brazil) A Miele
7^{7}
2
[6]

(Argentina) Matías Rodolfo Buchhass
(Argentina) Luciano Doria
4
6^{4}

4
- (Argentina) N Kicker
- (Argentina) R Olivo
5
1

WC
(Uruguay) R Arus
(Uruguay) Lucas Monterroso
0
5

- (Brazil) W Leite
- (Brazil) A Miele
7
6

- (Brazil) Wilson Leite
- (Brazil) A Miele
6
7

1
- (Uruguay) M Cuevas
- (Uruguay) P Cuevas
6
6

(Brazil) JP Sorgi
(Canada) David Volfson
4
3

- (Chile) N Jarry
- (Chile) G Lama
2
4

(Argentina) Juan Ignacio Ameal
(Argentina) Sebastián Exequiel Pini
6
6

(Argentina) JI Ameal
(Argentina) SE Pini
1
2

- (Chile) N Jarry
- (Chile) G Lama
6
6

- (Chile) N Jarry
- (Chile) G Lama
6
6

3
- (Bolivia) H Dellien
- (Argentina) M Trungelliti
4
4

- (Chile) N Jarry
- (Chile) G Lama
6
6

- (Uruguay) A Behar
- (Italy) G Quinzi
w/o

- (Uruguay) A Behar
- (Italy) G Quinzi
2
3

(Argentina) Manuel Barros
(Brazil) Marcos Vinicius Dias

- (Uruguay) A Behar
- (Italy) G Quinzi
2
6
[11]

(Argentina) JP Ficovich
(Japan) Ryūsei Makiguchi
4
2

2
- (Argentina) F Argüello
- (Argentina) T Lipovšek Puches
6
3
[9]

2
- (Argentina) F Argüello
- (Argentina) T Lipovšek Puches
6
6
