= 2016 Uruguay Open – Singles =

Singles
- 2016 Uruguay Open

Final
- Champion: (Argentina) Diego Schwartzman
- Runner-up: (Brazil) Rogério Dutra Silva
- Score: 6–4, 6–1

Events
Singles	Doubles
- Uruguay Open

Guido Pella was the defending champion but chose not to defend his title.

Diego Schwartzman won the title after defeating Rogério Dutra Silva 6–4, 6–1 in the final.

== Seeds ==
1. (Spain) Nicolás Almagro (quarterfinals)
2. (Argentina) Diego Schwartzman (champion)
3. (Argentina) Horacio Zeballos (quarterfinals)
4. (Spain) Íñigo Cervantes (quarterfinals)
5. (Argentina) Carlos Berlocq (semifinals, retired)
6. (Brazil) Rogério Dutra Silva (final)
7. (Argentina) Guido Andreozzi (second round, retired)
8. (Argentina) Nicolás Kicker (quarterfinals)

== Draw ==
Key

- Q = Qualifier
- WC = Wild card
- LL = Lucky loser
- Alt = Alternate
- ITF = ITF entry
- PR = Protected ranking
- SR = Special ranking
- SE = Special exempt
- JE = Junior exempt
- JR = Junior Accelerator Programme entrant
- CO = College Accelerator Programme entrant
- NG = Next Gen Accelerator Program entrant
- w/o = Walkover
- r = Retired
- d = Defaulted

=== Finals ===
Semifinals
(Chile) Cristian Garín	2	2
6	(Brazil) Rogério Dutra Silva	6	6
5	(Argentina) Carlos Berlocq	1	1^{r}
2/WC	(Argentina) Diego Schwartzman	6	4

Final
6	(Brazil) Rogério Dutra Silva	4	1
2/WC	(Argentina) Diego Schwartzman	6	6

=== Top half ===
First round
1/WC	(Spain) N Almagro	7^{7}	7^{8}
Q	(Chile) N Jarry	6^{4}	6^{6}
(Belgium) A De Greef	7^{7}	6
Q	(Argentina) A Molteni	6^{2}	3
(Chile) H Podlipnik	3	6	3
(Chile) C Garín	6	3	6
WC	(Uruguay) M Felder	0	2
7	(Argentina) G Andreozzi	6	6
3	(Argentina) H Zeballos	6	6
(Ecuador) E Gómez	4	4
(Argentina) JI Londero	6	6
(Chile) MT Barrios Vera	0	1
(Colombia) DE Galán	5	7	5
(Argentina) F Mena	7	5	7
Q	(Austria) M Linzer	7^{7}	2	0^{r}
6	(Brazil) R Dutra Silva	6^{5}	6	2

Second round
1/WC	(Spain) N Almagro	7	6
(Belgium) A De Greef	5	3
(Chile) C Garín	6	3
7	(Argentina) G Andreozzi	4	2^{r}
3	(Argentina) H Zeballos	6	3	6
(Argentina) JI Londero	2	6	3
(Argentina) F Mena	1	2
6	(Brazil) R Dutra Silva	6	6

Quarterfinals
1/WC	(Spain) N Almagro	6	5	3
(Chile) C Garín	3	7	6
3	(Argentina) H Zeballos	6	4	2
6	(Brazil) R Dutra Silva	2	6	6

Semifinals
(Chile) C Garín	2	2
6	(Brazil) R Dutra Silva	6	6

=== Bottom half ===
First round
5	(Argentina) C Berlocq	6	6
(Argentina) Juan Ignacio Galarza	2	2
(Argentina) F Coria	6	6
(Argentina) A Collarini	4	1
(Brazil) C Zampieri	3	7^{7}	6
(Argentina) M Kestelboim	6	6^{5}	1
(Argentina) A Velotti	3	4
4	(Spain) Í Cervantes	6	6
8	(Argentina) N Kicker	6	6
(Japan) K Uchida	2	1
(Chile) Bastián Malla	6	6
WC	(Uruguay) S Maresca	3	4
Q	(Brazil) J Menezes	2	3
(Argentina) T Lipovšek Puches	6	6
(Argentina) Maximiliano Estévez	0	1
2/WC	(Argentina) D Schwartzman	6	6

Second round
5	(Argentina) C Berlocq	6	6
(Argentina) F Coria	1	2
(Brazil) C Zampieri	7	2	1
4	(Spain) Í Cervantes	5	6	6
8	(Argentina) N Kicker	6	6
(Chile) B Malla	1	1
(Argentina) T Lipovšek Puches	1	3
2/WC	(Argentina) D Schwartzman	6	6

Quarterfinals
5	(Argentina) C Berlocq	3	6	6
4	(Spain) Í Cervantes	6	4	3
8	(Argentina) N Kicker	4	6^{4}
2/WC	(Argentina) D Schwartzman	6	7^{7}

Semifinals
5	(Argentina) C Berlocq	1	1^{r}
2/WC	(Argentina) D Schwartzman	6	4
