= 2016 Uruguay Open =

- Date: 14 November – 20 November
- Edition: 12th
- Surface: Clay
- Location: Montevideo, Uruguay

Champions

Singles
- (Argentina) Diego Schwartzman

Doubles
- (Argentina) Andrés Molteni / (Argentina) Diego Schwartzman
- Uruguay Open

The 2016 Uruguay Open is a professional tennis tournament played on clay courts. It is the twelfth edition of the tournament which is part of the 2016 ATP Challenger Tour. It takes place in Montevideo, Uruguay between November 14 and November 20, 2016.

== Singles main-draw entrants ==
=== Seeds ===
Country	Player	Rank^{1}	Seed
ESP	Nicolás Almagro	45	1
ARG	Diego Schwartzman	58	2
ARG	Horacio Zeballos	81	3
ESP	Íñigo Cervantes	83	4
ARG	Carlos Berlocq	89	5
BRA	Rogério Dutra Silva	106	6
ARG	Guido Andreozzi	109	7
ARG	Nicolás Kicker	110	8

- ^{1} Rankings are as of November 7, 2016.

=== Other entrants ===
The following players received wildcards into the singles main draw:

- (Spain) Nicolás Almagro
- (Uruguay) Marcel Felder
- (Uruguay) Santiago Maresca
- (Argentina) Diego Schwartzman

The following players received entry from the qualifying draw:

- (Chile) Nicolás Jarry
- (Austria) Michael Linzer
- (Brazil) João Menezes
- (Argentina) Andrés Molteni

== Champions ==
=== Singles ===
- (Argentina) Diego Schwartzman def. (Brazil) Rogério Dutra Silva, 6–4, 6–1.

=== Doubles ===
- (Argentina) Andrés Molteni / (Argentina) Diego Schwartzman def. (Brazil) Fabiano de Paula / (Chile) Cristian Garín, walkover.
