= 2009 Copa Petrobras Montevideo =

- Date: 5–11 October
- Edition: 5th
- Location: Montevideo, Uruguay

Champions

Singles
- (Uruguay) Pablo Cuevas

Doubles
- (Spain) David Marrero / (Argentina) Juan Pablo Brzezicki
- Copa Petrobras Montevideo

The 2009 Copa Petrobras Montevideo was a professional tennis tournament played on outdoor red clay courts. It was the fifth edition of the tournament which was part of the 2009 ATP Challenger Tour. It took place in Montevideo, Uruguay between 5 and 11 October 2009.

== Singles main draw entrants ==
=== Seeds ===
| Country | Player | Rank^{1} | Seed |
|---|---|---|---|
| URU | Pablo Cuevas | 56 | 1 |
| ARG | Máximo González | 70 | 2 |
| CHI | Paul Capdeville | 78 | 3 |
| CHI | Nicolás Massú | 91 | 4 |
| ARG | Juan Ignacio Chela | 110 | 5 |
| ESP | Santiago Ventura | 113 | 6 |
| ESP | Rubén Ramírez Hidalgo | 125 | 7 |
| FRA | Laurent Recouderc | 130 | 8 |

- Rankings are as of September 28, 2009.

=== Other entrants ===
The following players received wildcards into the singles main draw:

- (Uruguay) Martín Cuevas
- (Paraguay) Ramón Delgado
- (Peru) Luis Horna
- (Argentina) Mariano Puerta

The following players received entry from the qualifying draw:

- (Argentina) Martín Alund
- (Argentina) Juan-Martín Aranguren
- (Argentina) Leandro Migani
- (Portugal) Leonardo Tavares

The following players received entry from Special Exempt draw:

- (Argentina) Gastón Gaudio

The following players received entry from Alternate draw:

- (Spain) David Marrero

== Champions ==
=== Singles ===
(Uruguay) Pablo Cuevas def. (Ecuador) Nicolás Lapentti, 7–5, 6–1

=== Doubles ===
(Argentina) Juan Pablo Brzezicki / (Spain) David Marrero def. (Uruguay) Martín Cuevas / (Uruguay) Pablo Cuevas, 6–4, 6–4
