= 2012 Uruguay Open =

- Date: 29 October – 4 November
- Edition: 8th
- Surface: Clay
- Location: Montevideo, Uruguay

Champions

Singles
- (Argentina) Horacio Zeballos

Doubles
- (Croatia) Nikola Mektić / (Croatia) Antonio Veić
- Uruguay Open

The 2012 Uruguay Open was a professional tennis tournament played on clay courts. It was the eighth edition of the tournament which was part of the 2012 ATP Challenger Tour. It took place in Montevideo, Uruguay between October 29 and November 4, 2012.

== Singles main draw entrants ==
=== Seeds ===
Country	Player	Rank^{1}	Seed
POR	João Sousa	92	1
AUT	Andreas Haider-Maurer	99	2
FRA	Guillaume Rufin	107	3
SVN	Blaž Kavčič	108	4
ARG	Guido Pella	117	5
ROU	Adrian Ungur	118	6
ARG	Horacio Zeballos	120	7
NED	Thiemo de Bakker	130	8

- ^{1} Rankings are as of October 22, 2012.

=== Other entrants ===
The following players received wildcards into the singles main draw:

- (Uruguay) Ariel Behar
- (Serbia) Marko Djokovic
- (Uruguay) Marcel Felder
- (Argentina) Máximo González

The following players received entry as an alternate into the singles main draw:

- (Netherlands) Boy Westerhof

The following players received entry as a special exempt into the singles main draw:

- (Argentina) Diego Schwartzman

The following players received entry from the qualifying draw:

- (Bosnia and Herzegovina) Tomislav Brkić
- (Belgium) Arthur De Greef
- (Argentina) Diego Junqueira
- (France) Stéphane Robert
- (Netherlands) Antal van der Duim (Lucky loser)

== Champions ==
=== Singles ===
- (Argentina) Horacio Zeballos def. (Germany) Julian Reister, 6–3, 6–2

=== Doubles ===
- (Croatia) Nikola Mektić / (Croatia) Antonio Veić def. (Slovenia) Blaž Kavčič / (Croatia) Franco Škugor, 6–3, 5–7, [10–7]
