= Francisco Llanes =

Uruguayan tennis player

- Country (sports): Uruguay
- Residence: Buenos Aires, Argentina
- Born: 16 April 2002 (age 23) Paysandú, Uruguay
- Height: 1.75 m (5 ft 9 in)
- Plays: Right-handed (two-handed backhand)
- Prize money: $9,843

Singles
- Career record: 1–1 (at ATP Tour level, Grand Slam level, and in Davis Cup)
- Career titles: 0
- Highest ranking: No. 1,005 (20 June 2022)

Grand Slam singles results
- Australian Open Junior: Q2 (2020)

Doubles
- Career record: 0–0 (at ATP Tour level, Grand Slam level, and in Davis Cup)
- Career titles: 0
- Highest ranking: No. 897 (15 August 2022)

Francisco Llanes (born 16 April 2002) is a Uruguayan tennis player.

Llanes represents Uruguay at the Davis Cup, where he has a W/L record of 1–0.
