= Rodrigo Arús =

Uruguayan tennis player (born 1995)

- Country (sports): Uruguay
- Born: 20 February 1995 (age 30)
- Prize money: $4,908

Singles
- Career record: 1–3 (at ATP Tour level, Grand Slam level, and in Davis Cup)
- Career titles: 0
- Highest ranking: No. 1190 (10 November 2014)

Doubles
- Career record: 0–1 (at ATP Tour level, Grand Slam level, and in Davis Cup)
- Career titles: 0
- Highest ranking: No. 1453 (18 December 2017)
- Last updated on: 5 June 2018.

Rodrigo Arús (born 20 February 1995) is an Uruguayan tennis player.

Arús has a career high ATP singles ranking of 1190 achieved on 10 November 2014. He also has a career high ATP doubles ranking of 1453 achieved on 18 December 2017.

Arús represents Uruguay at the Davis Cup, where he has a W/L record of 1–4.
