= Diego Junqueira =

Argentine tennis player

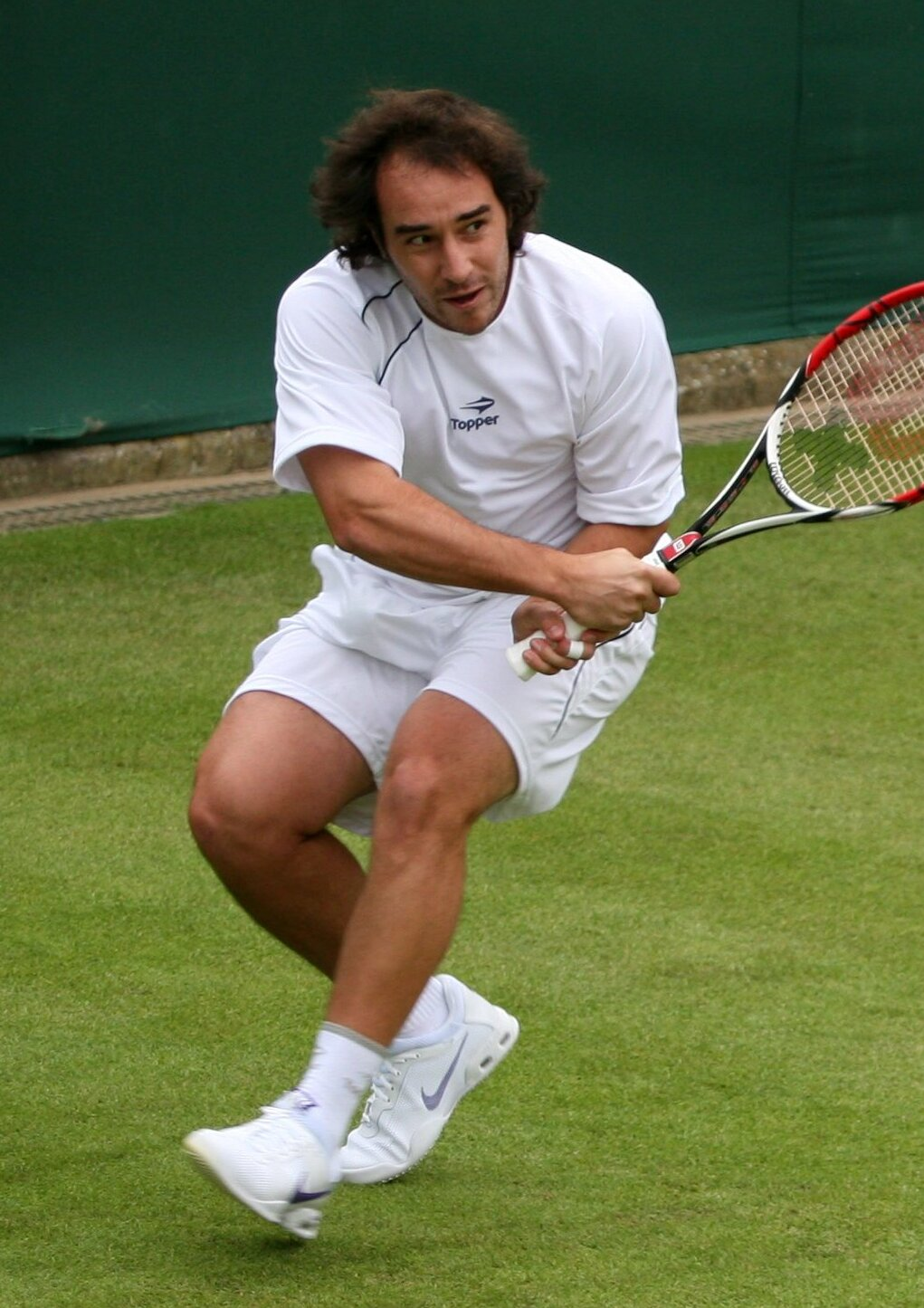
- Country (sports): Argentina
- Residence: Buenos Aires, Argentina
- Born: December 28, 1980 (age 44); Tandil, Argentina
- Height: 1.78 m (5 ft 10 in)
- Turned pro: 2001
- Retired: 2014
- Plays: Left-handed (two-handed backhand)
- Prize money: $727,371

Singles
- Career record: 11–33
- Career titles: 0
- Highest ranking: No. 68 (March 9, 2009)

Grand Slam singles results
- Australian Open: 1R (2009)
- French Open: 2R (2008, 2009)
- Wimbledon: 1R (2009)
- US Open: 2R (2011)

Doubles
- Career record: 1–17
- Career titles: 0
- Highest ranking: No. 156 (September 27, 2010)
- Current ranking: No. 680 (November 11, 2013)
- Last updated on: April 2, 2012.

Diego Junqueira (Spanish pronunciation: [ˈdjeɣo xuŋˈkejɾa]; born December 28, 1980) is a tennis coach and former professional player from Argentina. He plays left-handed with a double-handed backhand and his highest singles rank was world no.68, achieved on March 9, 2009.

== Junior career ==
Diego "Chuky" Junqueira did not appear to have much of a juniors career, according to available ITF results, which show only one top-level tournament for him, in which he qualified and lost first round in Argentina in 1998.

== Professional career ==
=== 2000 to 2007 ===
Junqueira reached a career high of #146 in June 2006.

=== 2008 ===
During late February to early April, Junqueira had good success at the Challenger level, reaching the semifinal in Chile (losing to No. 140 Eduardo Schwank), the final in Ecuador (beating No. 155 Fernando Vicente along the way), and the semifinal in France (beating No. 105 Boris Pašanski and No. 192 Marc López), to get himself back into the top-200 for the first time in almost 2 years.

In May, he won a Challenger in Italy, beating No. 206 Dick Norman, No. 162 Harel Levy, No. 97 Santiago Ventura, No. 153 Nicolas Devilder, and No. 149 Máximo González, those last four being the No. 6, No. 1, No. 5, and No. 4 seeds in the tournament. He then beat No. 102 Luis Horna in the qualifying round to make the main draw of the 2008 French Open.

=== 2009 ===
In the 2009 Australian Open, he lost to Richard Gasquet in a four set match in the first round.
