= Santiago Maresca =

Uruguayan tennis player

- Country (sports): Uruguay
- Born: 14 September 1994 (age 31) Montevideo, Uruguay
- Plays: Right-handed
- Prize money: $21,186

Singles
- Career record: 1–4 (at ATP Tour level, Grand Slam level, and in Davis Cup)
- Career titles: 0
- Highest ranking: No. 884 (11 September 2017)

Doubles
- Career record: 1–1 (at ATP Tour level, Grand Slam level, and in Davis Cup)
- Career titles: 1 ITF
- Highest ranking: No. 746 (19 June 2017)

Santiago Maresca (Spanish pronunciation: [sanˈtjaɣo maˈɾeska]; born 14 September 1994) is a Uruguayan former professional tennis player.

Maresca has a career high ATP singles ranking of 884, achieved on 11 September 2017. He also has a career-high ATP doubles ranking of 746, achieved on 19 June 2017.

Maresca represented Uruguay at the Davis Cup, where he has a win–loss record of 2–5.
