= Uruguay Open =

- 2025 Uruguay Open

ATP Challenger Tour
- Location: Montevideo, Uruguay
- Venue: Carrasco Lawn Tennis Club
- Category: ATP Challenger Tour (-2022), ATP Challenger 100 (2023-)
- Surface: Clay / outdoors
- Draw: 32S/16Q/16D
- Prize money: $133,250
- Website: Website

Current champions (2025)
- Singles: (Chile) Cristian Garín
- Doubles: (Argentina) Facundo Mena (Mexico) Rodrigo Pacheco Méndez

The Uruguay Open is a tennis tournament held in Montevideo, Uruguay since 2005. The event is part of the ATP Challenger Tour and is played on outdoor clay courts. This is the successor tournament to the earlier Uruguay International Championships (1936–1970), that was last played at the Carrasco Lawn Tennis Club.

== Past finals ==
=== Singles ===
Year	Champion	Runner-up	Score
2026	(Brazil) Thiago Seyboth Wild	(Brazil) Matheus Pucinelli de Almeida	6–3, 6–4
2025	(Chile) Cristian Garín	(Peru) Ignacio Buse	6–7^{(3–7)}, 6–2, 6–2
2024	(United States) Tristan Boyer	(Bolivia) Hugo Dellien	6–2, 6–4
2023	(Argentina) Facundo Díaz Acosta	(Brazil) Thiago Monteiro	6–3, 4–3 ret.
2022	(Argentina) Genaro Alberto Olivieri	(Argentina) Tomás Martín Etcheverry	6–7^{(3–7)}, 7–6^{(7–5)}, 6–3
2021	(Bolivia) Hugo Dellien	(Argentina) Juan Ignacio Londero	6–0, 6–1
2020	cancelled due to the COVID-19 pandemic		
2019	(Spain) Jaume Munar	(Argentina) Federico Delbonis	7–5, 6–2
2018	(Argentina) Guido Pella (2)	(Argentina) Carlos Berlocq	6–3, 3–6, 6–1
2017	(Uruguay) Pablo Cuevas (3)	(Portugal) Gastão Elias	6-4, 6-3
2016	(Argentina) Diego Schwartzman	(Brazil) Rogério Dutra Silva	6-4, 6-1
2015	(Argentina) Guido Pella	(Spain) Íñigo Cervantes	7–5, 2–6, 6–4
2014	(Uruguay) Pablo Cuevas (2)	(Bolivia) Hugo Dellien	6–2, 6–4
2013	(Brazil) Thomaz Bellucci	(Argentina) Diego Schwartzman	6–4, 6–4
2012	(Argentina) Horacio Zeballos	(Germany) Julian Reister	6–3, 6–2
2011	(Argentina) Carlos Berlocq	(Argentina) Máximo González	6–2, 7–5
2010	(Argentina) Máximo González	(Uruguay) Pablo Cuevas	1–6, 6–3, 6–4
2009	(Uruguay) Pablo Cuevas	(Ecuador) Nicolás Lapentti	7–5, 6–1
2008	(Australia) Peter Luczak	(Chile) Nicolás Massú	walkover
2007	(Spain) Santiago Ventura	(Spain) Marcel Granollers Pujol	4–6, 6–0, 6–4
2006	(Argentina) Guillermo Cañas	(Ecuador) Nicolás Lapentti	2–6, 6–3, 7–6
2005	(Argentina) Juan Martín del Potro	(Serbia and Montenegro) Boris Pašanski	6–3, 2–6, 7–6

=== Doubles ===
Year	Champions	Runners-up	Score
2026	(Colombia) Nicolás Barrientos (Argentina) Mariano Kestelboim	(Poland) Karol Drzewiecki (Poland) Piotr Matuszewski	6–3, 6–2
2025	(Argentina) Facundo Mena (Mexico) Rodrigo Pacheco Méndez	(Ecuador) Gonzalo Escobar (Mexico) Miguel Ángel Reyes-Varela	3–6, 6–3, [11–9]
2024	(Argentina) Guido Andreozzi (3) (Brazil) Orlando Luz	(Argentina) Mariano Kestelboim (Uruguay) Franco Roncadelli	4–6, 6–3, [10–8]
2023	(Argentina) Guido Andreozzi (2) (Argentina) Guillermo Durán (2)	(Bolivia) Boris Arias (Bolivia) Federico Zeballos	2–6, 7–6^{(7–2)}, [10–8]
2022	(Poland) Karol Drzewiecki (Poland) Piotr Matuszewski	(Argentina) Facundo Díaz Acosta (Venezuela) Luis David Martínez	6–4, 6–4
2021	(Brazil) Rafael Matos (Brazil) Felipe Meligeni Alves	(Uruguay) Ignacio Carou (Italy) Luciano Darderi	6–4, 6–4
2020	cancelled due to the COVID-19 pandemic		
2019	(Argentina) Facundo Bagnis (Argentina) Andrés Molteni (2)	(Brazil) Orlando Luz (Brazil) Rafael Matos	6–4, 5–7, [12–10]
2018	(Argentina) Guido Andreozzi (Argentina) Guillermo Durán	(Argentina) Facundo Bagnis (Argentina) Andrés Molteni	7–6^{(7–5)}, 6–4
2017	(Monaco) Romain Arneodo (Brazil) Fernando Romboli	(Uruguay) Ariel Behar (Brazil) Fabiano de Paula	2–6, 6–4, [10–8]
2016	(Argentina) Andrés Molteni (Argentina) Diego Schwartzman	(Brazil) Fabiano de Paula (Chile) Christian Garin	walkover
2015	(Slovakia) Andrej Martin (Chile) Hans Podlipnik	(Brazil) Marcelo Demoliner (Portugal) Gastão Elias	6–4, 3–6, [10–6]
2014	(Uruguay) Martín Cuevas (2) (Uruguay) Pablo Cuevas (3)	(Chile) Nicolás Jarry (Chile) Gonzalo Lama	6–2, 6–4
2013	(Uruguay) Martín Cuevas (Uruguay) Pablo Cuevas (2)	(Brazil) André Ghem (Brazil) Rogério Dutra Silva	walkover
2012	(Croatia) Nikola Mektić (Croatia) Antonio Veić	(Slovenia) Blaž Kavčič (Croatia) Franco Škugor	6–3, 5–7, [10–7]
2011	(Serbia) Nikola Ćirić (Montenegro) Goran Tošić	(Uruguay) Marcel Felder (Argentina) Diego Schwartzman	7–6^{(7–5)}, 7–6^{(7–4)}
2010	(Argentina) Carlos Berlocq (Argentina) Brian Dabul (2)	(Argentina) Máximo González (Argentina) Sebastián Prieto	7–5, 6–3
2009	(Argentina) Juan Pablo Brzezicki (Spain) David Marrero	(Uruguay) Martín Cuevas (Uruguay) Pablo Cuevas	6–4, 6–4
2008	(Brazil) Franco Ferreiro (Brazil) Flávio Saretta	(Spain) Daniel Gimeno Traver (Spain) Rubén Ramírez Hidalgo	6–3, 6–2
2007	(Uruguay) Pablo Cuevas (Peru) Luis Horna	(Spain) Marcel Granollers (Spain) Santiago Ventura	walkover
2006	(Argentina) Máximo González (Argentina) Sergio Roitman	(Argentina) Guillermo Cañas (Argentina) Martín García	6–3, 7–6
2005	(Argentina) Brian Dabul (Argentina) Damián Patriarca	(Austria) Daniel Köllerer (Austria) Oliver Marach	6–0, 6–4

== See also ==
- Montevideo Open
