= Martín Cuevas =

Uruguayan tennis player

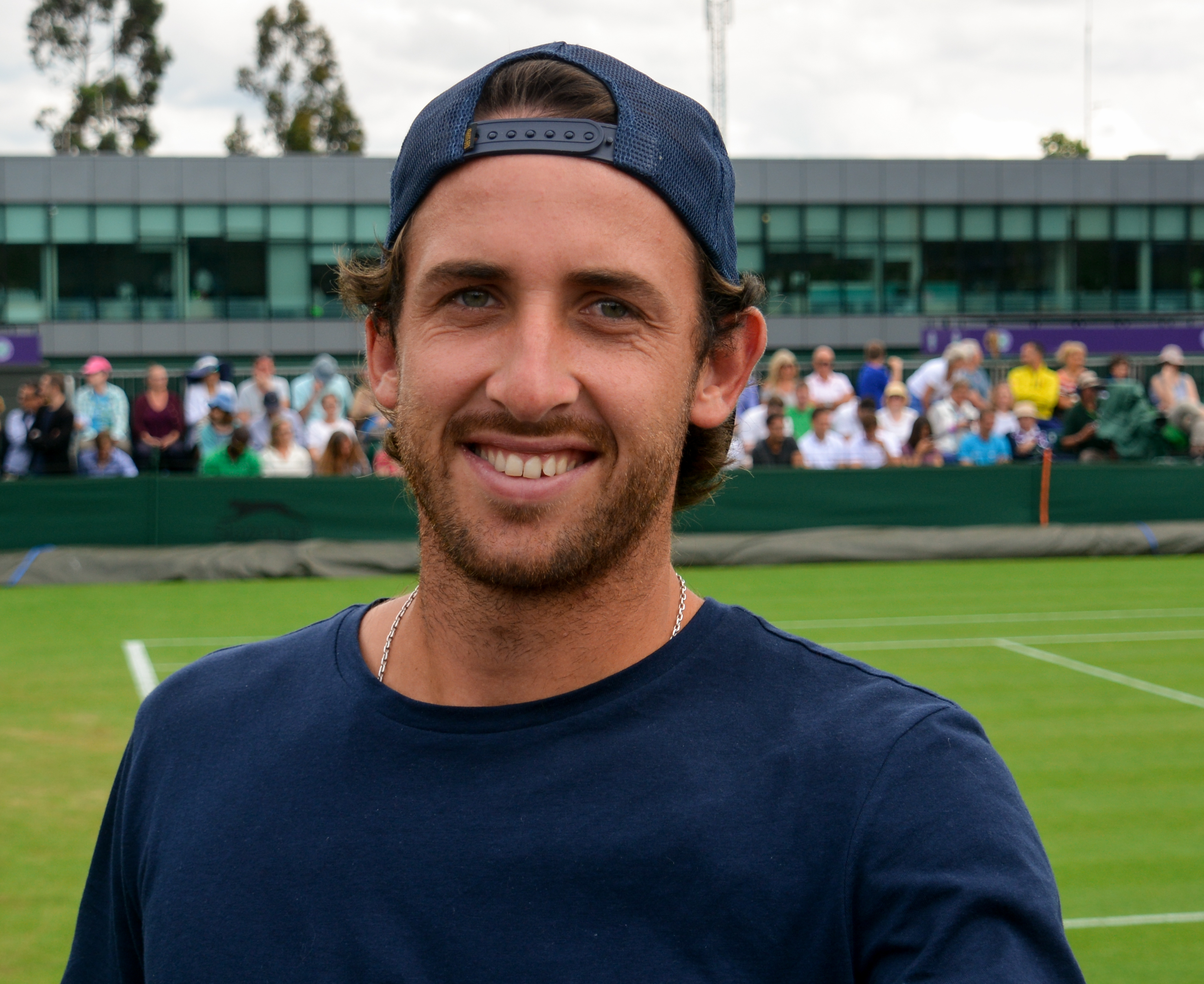
- Country (sports): Uruguay
- Residence: Salto, Uruguay
- Born: January 14, 1992 (age 33) Salto, Uruguay
- Height: 6 ft 3 in (191 cm)
- Turned pro: 2010
- Plays: Right handed (one handed backhand)
- Coach: Felipe Maccio
- Prize money: $218,106

Singles
- Career record: 6–22
- Career titles: 0
- Highest ranking: No. 271 (9 April 2018)

Doubles
- Career record: 9–4
- Career titles: 0
- Highest ranking: No. 153 (13 May 2019)

Martín Cuevas Urroz (Spanish pronunciation: [maɾˈtiŋ ˈkweβas]; (Note: In isolation, Martín is pronounced Spanish pronunciation: [maɾˈtin].) born January 14, 1992, in Salto, Uruguay) is a Uruguayan professional tennis player.

== Career ==
Martín Cuevas is the brother of the Uruguayan player Pablo Cuevas. The brothers have played together in the ATP Challenger Tour, winning the Copa Petrobras in Montevideo twice and Lyon once. Martín made his debut in Davis Cup against Dominican Republic, losing to Jhonson García. In total, he has a W/L record in Davis Cup of 15–19. Cuevas won 11 ITF Future singles titles and 12 ITF doubles titles.

== Challenger and Futures/World Tennis Tour Finals ==
=== Singles: 23 (11–12) ===
Legend (singles) ATP Challenger Tour (0–0) ITF Futures/World Tennis Tour (11–12)	Titles by surface Hard (0–0) Clay (11–12) Grass (0–0) Carpet (0–0)

Result	W–L	Date	Tournament	Tier	Surface	Opponent	Score
Loss	0–1	Jul 2013	Argentina F12, Resistencia	Futures	Clay	(Argentina) Patricio Heras	6–7^{(2–7)}, 6–4, 3–6
Loss	0–2	Sep 2013	Argentina F18, Neuquén	Futures	Clay	(Argentina) Tomás Lipovšek Puches	5–7, 7–6^{(7–3)}, 0–6
Loss	0–3	Sep 2013	Argentina F19, Córdoba	Futures	Clay	(Argentina) Nicolás Kicker	6–2, 4–6, 3–6
Loss	0–4	Apr 2014	Brazil F2, Itajaí	Futures	Clay	(Brazil) Caio Zampieri	4–6, 6–3, 3–6
Win	1–4	Aug 2014	Argentina F12, Corrientes	Futures	Clay	(Argentina) Juan Ignacio Ameal	7–6^{(7–5)}, 6–4
Win	2–4	Nov 2014	Brazil F12, São Paulo	Futures	Clay	(Brazil) Wilson Leite	6–4, 6–4
Win	3–4	Dec 2015	Dominican Republic F2, Santo Domingo	Futures	Clay	(Argentina) Juan Ignacio Galarza	7–5, 6–0
Win	4–4	May 2016	Romania F1, Galați	Futures	Clay	(Bulgaria) Aleksandar Lazov	6–4, 6–3
Win	5–4	Jun 2016	Romania F6, Buzău	Futures	Clay	(Romania) Petru-Alexandru Luncanu	6–0, 6–3
Win	6–4	Apr 2017	Turkey F15, Antalya	Futures	Clay	(Croatia) Mate Delić	4–6, 6–4, 6–1
Win	7–4	Apr 2017	Turkey F16, Antalya	Futures	Clay	(Turkey) Marsel İlhan	4–6, 6–4, 6–2
Loss	7–5	Jul 2017	Turkey F25, Istanbul	Futures	Clay	(France) Geoffrey Blancaneaux	5–7, 1–6
Loss	7–6	Jul 2017	Turkey F27, Istanbul	Futures	Clay	(Spain) Guillermo Olaso	4–6, 6–3, 4–6
Win	8–6	Sep 2017	Argentina F7, Buenos Aires	Futures	Clay	(Brazil) Daniel Dutra da Silva	6–4, 7–6^{(7–4)}
Win	9–6	Nov 2017	Argentina F9, Santa Fe	Futures	Clay	(Argentina) Geronimo Espin Busleiman	6–1, 6–0
Win	10–6	Dec 2017	Argentina F11, Mendoza	Futures	Clay	(Argentina) Hernán Casanova	6–4, 6–2
Win	11–6	Dec 2017	Argentina F12, San Juan	Futures	Clay	(Argentina) Juan Ignacio Galarza	6–3, 6–7^{(2–7)}, 6–4
Loss	11–7	Mar 2018	Italy F3, Santa Margherita di Pula	Futures	Clay	(Bolivia) Hugo Dellien	4–6, 6–7^{(3–7)}
Loss	11–8	Apr 2018	Italy F5, Santa Margherita di Pula	Futures	Clay	(Italy) Lorenzo Giustino	5–7, 5–7
Loss	11–9	May 2021	M15, Valldoreix, Spain	World Tennis Tour	Clay	(Spain) Álvaro López San Martín	6–2, 1–6, 4–6
Loss	11-10	Feb 2022	M15, Antalya, Turkey	World Tennis Tour	Clay	(Austria) Lukas Neumayer	2-6, 2-6
Loss	11-11	Feb 2022	M25, Antalya, Turkey	World Tennis Tour	Clay	(Italy) Riccardo Bonadio	3–6, 6–3, 5–7
Loss	11-12	Feb 2022	M25, Antalya, Turkey	World Tennis Tour	Clay	(Russia) Alexander Shevchenko	2-6, 1-6

=== Doubles: 41 (16–24) ===
Legend (doubles) ATP Challenger Tour (4–6) ITF Futures Tour (13–18)	Titles by surface Hard (0–1) Clay (17–23) Grass (0–0) Carpet (0–0)

Result	W–L	Date	Tournament	Tier	Surface	Partner	Opponents	Score
Loss	0–1	Jun 2009	Argentina F8, Rafaela	Futures	Clay	(Argentina) Patricio Heras	(Italy) Daniel Alejandro López (Argentina) Nicolás Pastor	2–6, 6–3, [6–10]
Loss	0–2	Oct 2009	Montevideo, Uruguay	Challenger	Clay	(Uruguay) Pablo Cuevas	(Argentina) Juan Pablo Brzezicki (Spain) David Marrero	4–6, 4–6
Loss	0–3	Feb 2010	Argentina F2, Tandil	Futures	Clay	(Argentina) Germán Gaich	(Argentina) Martín Alund (Italy) Daniel Alejandro López	3–6, 2–6
Win	1–3	May 2010	Argentina F6, Buenos Aires	Futures	Clay	(Argentina) Diego Cristin	(Argentina) Andrés Molteni (Argentina) Agustín Picco	6–2, 6–3
Loss	1–4	Aug 2010	Argentina F16, Santiago del Estero	Futures	Clay	(Argentina) Diego Cristin	(Argentina) Guillermo Bujniewicz (Argentina) Guillermo Durán	6–4, 2–6, [4–10]
Win	2–4	Nov 2010	Peru F1, Arequipa	Futures	Clay	(Argentina) Juan-Manuel Romanazzi	(Peru) Francisco Carbajal (Peru) Mauricio Echazú	6–4, 7–6^{(7–5)}
Win	3–4	Nov 2010	Peru F2, Chosica	Futures	Clay	(Argentina) Juan-Pablo Amado	(Peru) Rafael Aita (Brazil) Diego Matos	6–3, 6–4
Win	4–4	Feb 2011	Panama F1, Panama City	Futures	Clay	(Uruguay) Marcel Felder	(Bulgaria) Boris Nicola Bakalov (Germany) Alexander Satschko	7–5, 6–3
Loss	4–5	Apr 2011	Argentina F3, Bell Ville	Futures	Clay	(Argentina) Juan-Manuel Romanazzi	(Argentina) Martín Alund (Argentina) Andrés Molteni	4–6, 6–7^{(4–7)}
Loss	4–6	Jun 2011	Brazil F16, Marília	Futures	Clay	(Argentina) Guido Andreozzi	(Brazil) Tiago Lopes (Brazil) André Miele	6–2, 4–6, [6–10]
Loss	4–7	Aug 2011	Peru F1, Arequipa	Futures	Clay	(Argentina) Guido Pella	(Peru) Duilio Beretta (Peru) Sergio Galdós	4–6, 0–6
Loss	4–8	Aug 2011	Peru F2, Chosica	Futures	Clay	(Argentina) Guido Andreozzi	(Peru) Mauricio Echazú (Venezuela) Román Recarte	7–5, 4–6, [5–10]
Win	5–8	Nov 2011	Brazil F40, Foz do Iguaçu	Futures	Clay	(Argentina) Juan-Manuel Romanazzi	(Italy) Giammarco Micolani (Italy) Giorgio Portaluri	6–4, 6–2
Win	6–8	Feb 2012	Brazil F7, Lages	Futures	Clay	(Brazil) Fabrício Neis	(Brazil) Victor Maynard (Brazil) João Pedro Sorgi	6–3, 6–3
Loss	6–9	Jun 2012	Argentina F11, San Francisco	Futures	Clay	(Argentina) José María Paniagua	(Argentina) Facundo Argüello (Argentina) Diego Schwartzman	2–6, 2–6
Loss	6–10	Jul 2012	Argentina F18, Bell Ville	Futures	Clay	(Argentina) Juan Ignacio Londero	(Argentina) Guillermo Durán (Argentina) Renzo Olivo	4–6, 5–7
Loss	6–11	Oct 2012	Brazil F28, São José dos Campos	Futures	Clay	(Brazil) Caio Silva	(Brazil) Wilson Leite (Brazil) C E Severino	3–6, 6–4, [5–10]
Win	7–11	Jul 2013	Argentina F13, Posadas	Futures	Clay	(Argentina) Mateo Nicolás Martínez	(Argentina) Patricio Heras (Argentina) J-J Monteferrario	4–6, 6–4, [10–8]
Loss	7–12	Aug 2013	Argentina F15, San Juan	Futures	Clay	(Peru) Sergio Galdós	(Argentina) Guillermo Carry (Argentina) Andrés Molteni	1–6, 4–6
Loss	7–13	Aug 2013	Argentina F16, Santiago del Estero	Futures	Clay	(Peru) Sergio Galdós	(Argentina) Guillermo Durán (Argentina) Andrés Molteni	7–6^{(7–4)}, 3–6, [11–13]
Win	8–13	Oct 2013	Bolivia F5, Santa Cruz	Futures	Clay	(Argentina) Juan Ignacio Ameal	(United States) Christopher Racz (Colombia) Steffen Zornosa	3–6, 7–5, [10–7]
Win	9–13	Nov 2013	Montevideo, Uruguay	Challenger	Clay	(Uruguay) Pablo Cuevas	(Brazil) Rogério Dutra Silva (Brazil) André Ghem	walkover
Win	10–13	Mar 2014	Peru F1, Lima	Futures	Clay	(Brazil) Fabrício Neis	(Brazil) Fabiano de Paula (Argentina) Gastón-Arturo Grimolizzi	6–7^{(4–7)}, 6–2, [10–2]
Loss	10–14	Sep 2014	Quito, Ecuador	Challenger	Clay	(Peru) Duilio Beretta	(Brazil) Marcelo Demoliner (Brazil) João Souza	4–6, 4–6
Win	11–14	Nov 2014	Montevideo, Uruguay	Challenger	Clay	(Uruguay) Pablo Cuevas	(Chile) Nicolás Jarry (Chile) Gonzalo Lama	6–2, 6–4
Loss	11–15	Dec 2014	Chile F9, Osorno	Futures	Clay (i)	(Uruguay) Rodrigo Senattore	(Chile) Hans Podlipnik Castillo (Chile) Cristóbal Saavedra Corvalán	6–7^{(7–9)}, 6–2, [8–10]
Loss	11–16	Dec 2014	Chile F10, Santiago	Futures	Clay	(Brazil) Gustavo Guerses	(Chile) Julio Peralta (United States) Matt Seeberger	2–6, 3–6
Loss	11–17	Mar 2015	Chile F2, Viña del Mar	Futures	Clay	(Argentina) Nicolás Kicker	(Chile) Jorge Aguilar (Chile) Hans Podlipnik Castillo	4–6, 6–7^{(5–7)}
Loss	11–18	Apr 2016	Turkey F15, Antalya	Futures	Hard	(Brazil) Henrique Cunha	(Lithuania) Lukas Mugevičius (Austria) David Pichler	4–6, 4–6
Loss	11–19	Jun 2016	Romania F6, Buzău	Futures	Clay	(Uruguay) Santiago Maresca	(Spain) Albert Alcaraz Ivorra (Chile) Cristóbal Saavedra Corvalán	5–7, 3–6
Win	12–19	Apr 2017	Turkey F16, Antalya	Futures	Clay	(Peru) Juan Pablo Varillas	(United Kingdom) Joel Cannell (Australia) James Frawley	6–2, 6–4
Win	13–19	May 2017	Sweden F1, Karlskrona	Futures	Clay	(Sweden) Christian Lindell	(Netherlands) David Pel (Netherlands) Botic van de Zandschulp	6–4, 6–7^{(3–7)}, [11–9]
Loss	13–20	Jul 2017	Turkey F27, Istanbul	Futures	Clay	(Argentina) Dante Gennaro	(Italy) Cristian Carli (Italy) Mirko Cutuli	2–6, 5–7
Win	14–20	Mar 2018	Italy F3, Santa Margherita di Pula	Futures	Clay	(Bolivia) Hugo Dellien	(Italy) Gianluca Di Nicola (Italy) Walter Trusendi	7–6^{(7–1)}, 7–5
Loss	14–21	Jun 2018	Prostějov, Czech Republic	Challenger	Clay	(Uruguay) Pablo Cuevas	(Ukraine) Denys Molchanov (Slovakia) Igor Zelenay	6–4, 3–6, [7–10]
Loss	14–22	Mar 2019	Santiago, Chile	Challenger	Clay	(Argentina) Facundo Argüello	(Argentina) Franco Agamenone (Brazil) Fernando Romboli	6–7^{(5–7)}, 6–1, [6–10]
Win	15–22	Apr 2019	Sarasota, United States	Challenger	Clay	(Italy) Paolo Lorenzi	(United Kingdom) Luke Bambridge (United Kingdom) Jonny O'Mara	7–6^{(7–5)}, 7–6^{(8–6)}
Win	16–22	Oct 2020	M25 Pardubice, Czech Republic	World Tennis Tour	Clay	(Argentina) Agustín Velotti	(United States) Christian Harrison (United States) Toby Kodat	3–6, 6–3, [10–6]
Win	17–22	June 2021	Lyon, France	Challenger	Clay	(Uruguay) Pablo Cuevas	(France) Tristan Lamasine (France) Albano Olivetti	6–3, 7–6^{(7–2)}
Loss	17–23	Dec 2021	Florianópolis, Brazil	Challenger	Clay	(Brazil) Rafael Matos	(Colombia) Nicolás Barrientos (Colombia) Alejandro Gómez	3-6, 3-6
Loss	17–24	Apr 2022	Murcia, Spain	Challenger	Clay	(Argentina) Pedro Cachin	(Spain) Íñigo Cervantes (Spain) Oriol Roca Batalla	7–6^{(7–4)}, 6–7^{(4–7)}, [7–10]
