= 2020 Punta Open – Doubles =

Doubles
- 2020 Punta Open

Final
- Champions: (Brazil) Orlando Luz (Brazil) Rafael Matos
- Runners-up: (Argentina) Juan Manuel Cerúndolo (Argentina) Thiago Agustín Tirante
- Score: 6–4, 6–2

Events
Singles	Doubles
← 2019 ·	Punta Open	· 2024 →

Guido Andreozzi and Guillermo Durán were the defending champions but only Durán chose to defend his title, partnering Mariano Kestelboim. Durán lost in the first round to Facundo Mena and Camilo Ugo Carabelli.

Orlando Luz and Rafael Matos won the title after defeating Juan Manuel Cerúndolo and Thiago Agustín Tirante 6–4, 6–2 in the final.

== Seeds ==
1. (Brazil) Orlando Luz / (Brazil) Rafael Matos (champions)
2. (Ecuador) Diego Hidalgo / (Brazil) Felipe Meligeni Alves (semifinals)
3. (France) Geoffrey Blancaneaux / (Brazil) Pedro Sakamoto (first round)
4. (Argentina) Facundo Argüello / (Uruguay) Martín Cuevas (first round)

== Draw ==
=== Key ===
- Q = Qualifier
- WC = Wild card
- LL = Lucky loser
- Alt = Alternate
- SE = Special exempt
- PR = Protected ranking
- ITF = ITF entry
- JE = Junior exempt
- w/o = Walkover
- r = Retired
- d = Defaulted
- SR = Special ranking

First round
1	(Brazil) O Luz (Brazil) R Matos	6	6
(Brazil) G Clezar (Brazil) F Neis	3	2
WC	(Uruguay) JM Fumeaux (Uruguay) Emiliano Troche	6^{2}	3
WC	(Argentina) H Casanova (Brazil) Oscar José Gutierrez	7^{7}	6
4	(Argentina) F Argüello (Uruguay) M Cuevas	4	2
(Peru) N Álvarez (Peru) S Galdós	6	6
(Spain) C Taberner (Spain) M Vilella Martínez
(Argentina) F Cerúndolo (Peru) JP Varillas	w/o
(Italy) A Giannessi (Italy) G Mager
WC	(Argentina) JM Cerúndolo (Argentina) TA Tirante	w/o
(Argentina) TM Etcheverry (Argentina) R Olivo	4	6	[10]
3	(France) G Blancaneaux (Brazil) P Sakamoto	6	4	[5]
(Argentina) F Mena (Argentina) C Ugo Carabelli	6	6
(Argentina) G Durán (Argentina) M Kestelboim	4	4
(Argentina) P Cachin (Spain) C Gómez-Herrera	6^{3}	3
2	(Ecuador) D Hidalgo (Brazil) F Meligeni Alves	7^{7}	6

Quarterfinals
1	(Brazil) O Luz (Brazil) R Matos	w/o
WC	(Argentina) H Casanova (Brazil) OJ Gutierrez
(Peru) N Álvarez (Peru) S Galdós	w/o
(Argentina) F Cerúndolo (Peru) JP Varillas
WC	(Argentina) JM Cerúndolo (Argentina) TA Tirante	3	6	[10]
(Argentina) TM Etcheverry (Argentina) R Olivo	6	3	[8]
(Argentina) F Mena (Argentina) C Ugo Carabelli	4	4
2	(Ecuador) D Hidalgo (Brazil) F Meligeni Alves	6	6

Semifinals
1	(Brazil) O Luz (Brazil) R Matos	7^{7}	7^{10}
(Peru) N Álvarez (Peru) S Galdós	6^{5}	6^{8}
WC	(Argentina) JM Cerúndolo (Argentina) TA Tirante	6	6
2	(Ecuador) D Hidalgo (Brazil) F Meligeni Alves	3	2

Final
1	(Brazil) O Luz (Brazil) R Matos	6	6
WC	(Argentina) JM Cerúndolo (Argentina) TA Tirante	4	2
