= 2020 Punta Open – Singles =

Singles
- 2020 Punta Open

Final
- Champion: (Brazil) Thiago Monteiro
- Runner-up: (Italy) Marco Cecchinato
- Score: 7–6^{(7–3)}, 6–7^{(6–8)}, 7–5

Events
Singles	Doubles
← 2019 ·	Punta Open	· 2024 →

Thiago Monteiro was the defending champion and successfully defended his title, defeating Marco Cecchinato 7–6^{(7–3)}, 6–7^{(6–8)}, 7–5 in the final.

== Seeds ==
All seeds receive a bye into the second round.

1. (Italy) Marco Cecchinato (final)
2. (Brazil) Thiago Monteiro (champion)
3. (Slovakia) Andrej Martin (semifinals)
4. (Italy) Gianluca Mager (second round)
5. (Argentina) Federico Coria (third round)
6. (Argentina) Facundo Bagnis (quarterfinals)
7. (Portugal) Pedro Sousa (third round)
8. (Peru) Juan Pablo Varillas (second round)
9. (Italy) Alessandro Giannessi (quarterfinals)
10. (Portugal) João Domingues (second round)
11. (Spain) Carlos Taberner (second round)
12. (Argentina) Andrea Collarini (second round)
13. (Spain) Mario Vilella Martínez (second round)
14. (Argentina) Facundo Mena (second round)
15. (Brazil) Thiago Seyboth Wild (second round)
16. (Argentina) Francisco Cerúndolo (third round)

== Draw ==
Key

- Q = Qualifier
- WC = Wild card
- LL = Lucky loser
- Alt = Alternate
- ITF = ITF entry
- PR = Protected ranking
- SR = Special ranking
- SE = Special exempt
- JE = Junior exempt
- JR = Junior Accelerator Programme entrant
- CO = College Accelerator Programme entrant
- NG = Next Gen Accelerator Program entrant
- w/o = Walkover
- r = Retired
- d = Defaulted

=== Finals ===
Quarterfinals
1	(Italy) Marco Cecchinato	6	7
9	(Italy) Alessandro Giannessi	3	5
3	(Slovakia) Andrej Martin	6	6
6	(Argentina) Facundo Bagnis	1	3
(France) Geoffrey Blancaneaux	4	6^{3}
(Brazil) Felipe Meligeni Alves	6	7^{7}
(Brazil) Guilherme Clezar	4	1
2	(Brazil) Thiago Monteiro	6	6

Semifinals
1	(Italy) Marco Cecchinato	6	4	6
3	(Slovakia) Andrej Martin	4	6	4
(Brazil) Felipe Meligeni Alves	3	3
2	(Brazil) Thiago Monteiro	6	6

Final
1	(Italy) Marco Cecchinato	6^{3}	7^{8}	5
2	(Brazil) Thiago Monteiro	7^{7}	6^{6}	7

=== Top half ===
==== Section 1 ====
First round
(Argentina) G Villanueva	6	6
WC	(Uruguay) JM Fumeaux	2	0
(Peru) J Panta	2	2
(Argentina) R Olivo	6	6
(Argentina) F Argüello	3	3
(Argentina) TM Etcheverry	6	6
(Argentina) JM Cerúndolo	6	6
(Argentina) F Díaz Acosta	4	4

Second round
1	(Italy) M Cecchinato	6	6
(Argentina) G Villanueva	0	3
(Argentina) R Olivo	7	6
13	(Spain) M Vilella Martínez	5	1
9	(Italy) A Giannessi	5	7	6
(Argentina) TM Etcheverry	7	5	4
(Argentina) JM Cerúndolo	4	2
7	(Portugal) P Sousa	6	6

Third round
1	(Italy) M Cecchinato	6	6
(Argentina) R Olivo	3	4
9	(Italy) A Giannessi	4	6	6
7	(Portugal) P Sousa	6	3	4

Quarterfinals
1	(Italy) M Cecchinato	6	7
9	(Italy) A Giannessi	3	5

==== Section 2 ====
First round
(Ecuador) D Hidalgo	6	6
(Chile) MT Barrios Vera	2	1
Q	(Brazil) Gilbert Klier Júnior	6	4	0^{r}
(Argentina) H Casanova	3	6	5
WC	(Uruguay) M Cuevas	7^{7}	6
(Brazil) B Sant'Anna	6^{4}	4
(Brazil) R Matos	6	4	3
(Peru) N Álvarez	3	6	6

Second round
3	(Slovakia) A Martin	6	6
(Ecuador) D Hidalgo	3	3
(Argentina) H Casanova	6	1	6
15	(Brazil) T Seyboth Wild	4	6	1
11	(Spain) C Taberner	6	5	1
WC	(Uruguay) M Cuevas	2	7	6
(Peru) N Álvarez	6^{6}	6	1
6	(Argentina) F Bagnis	7^{8}	3	6

Third round
3	(Slovakia) A Martin	6	6
(Argentina) H Casanova	4	0
WC	(Uruguay) M Cuevas	3	5
6	(Argentina) F Bagnis	6	7

Quarterfinals
3	(Slovakia) A Martin	6	6
6	(Argentina) F Bagnis	1	3

=== Bottom half ===
==== Section 3 ====
First round
(France) G Blancaneaux	6	6
WC	(Denmark) H Rune	1	2
(Brazil) P Sakamoto	6	6
LL	(Uruguay) Emiliano Troche	2	0
WC	(Argentina) TA Tirante	1	4
(Argentina) GA Olivieri	6	6
(Brazil) F Meligeni Alves	6	6
Q	(Peru) S Galdós	2	4

Second round
8	(Peru) JP Varillas	4	3
(France) G Blancaneaux	6	6
(Brazil) P Sakamoto	7^{7}	6
10	(Portugal) J Domingues	6^{4}	2
14	(Argentina) F Mena	3	4
(Argentina) GA Olivieri	6	6
(Brazil) F Meligeni Alves	4	6	7^{7}
4	(Italy) G Mager	6	3	6^{5}

Third round
(France) G Blancaneaux	5	6	5
(Brazil) P Sakamoto	7	0	0^{r}
(Argentina) GA Olivieri	6^{5}	6	4
(Brazil) F Meligeni Alves	7^{7}	4	6

Quarterfinals
(France) G Blancaneaux	4	6^{3}
(Brazil) F Meligeni Alves	6	7^{7}

==== Section 4 ====
First round
(Spain) C Gómez-Herrera	6	7
(Argentina) JP Ficovich	3	5
(Brazil) G Clezar	6	7^{7}
(Argentina) P Cachin	4	6^{0}
(Brazil) O Luz	6	6
(Argentina) C Ugo Carabelli	4	2
(Brazil) Oscar José Gutierrez	4	6	5
WC	(Argentina) M Kestelboim	6	3	7

Second round
5	(Argentina) F Coria	6	6
(Spain) C Gómez-Herrera	4	4
(Brazil) G Clezar	7^{8}	7^{7}
12	(Argentina) A Collarini	6^{6}	6^{3}
16	(Argentina) F Cerúndolo	6	6
(Brazil) O Luz	3	3
WC	(Argentina) M Kestelboim	4	4
2	(Brazil) T Monteiro	6	6

Third round
5	(Argentina) F Coria	5	6	5
(Brazil) G Clezar	7	4	7
16	(Argentina) F Cerúndolo	5	4
2	(Brazil) T Monteiro	7	6

Quarterfinals
(Brazil) G Clezar	4	1
2	(Brazil) T Monteiro	6	6
