= 2018 Punta Open – Doubles =

Doubles
- 2018 Punta Open

Final
- Champions: (Argentina) Facundo Bagnis; (Uruguay) Ariel Behar
- Runners-up: (Italy) Simone Bolelli; (Italy) Alessandro Giannessi
- Score: 6–2, 7–6^{(9–7)}

Events
Singles	Doubles
Punta Open	· 2019 →

This was the first edition of the tournament.

Facundo Bagnis and Ariel Behar won the title after defeating Simone Bolelli and Alessandro Giannessi 6–2, 7–6^{(9–7)} in the final.

== Seeds ==
1. (Argentina) Guido Andreozzi / (Brazil) Fabiano de Paula (semifinals)
2. (Argentina) Facundo Bagnis / (Uruguay) Ariel Behar (champions)
3. (Argentina) Franco Agamenone / (Spain) Enrique López Pérez (first round)
4. (Argentina) Facundo Argüello / (Brazil) Fernando Romboli (quarterfinals)

== Draw ==
=== Key ===
- Q = Qualifier
- WC = Wild card
- LL = Lucky loser
- Alt = Alternate
- SE = Special exempt
- PR = Protected ranking
- ITF = ITF entry
- JE = Junior exempt
- w/o = Walkover
- r = Retired
- d = Defaulted
- SR = Special ranking

First round

Quarterfinals

Semifinals

Final

1
- (Argentina) G Andreozzi
- (Brazil) F de Paula
6
6

(Argentina) H Casanova
(Argentina) Juan Ignacio Galarza
4
3

1
- (Argentina) G Andreozzi
- (Brazil) F de Paula
6
6

WC
- (Uruguay) R Arús
- (Uruguay) N Xiviller
2
4

- (Argentina) A Collarini
- (Spain) C Taberner
4
2

- (Argentina) A Collarini
- (Spain) C Taberner
6
6

1
- (Argentina) G Andreozzi
- (Brazil) F de Paula
6
5
[7]

4
- (Argentina) F Argüello
- (Brazil) F Romboli
6
6^{4}
[10]

- (Italy) S Bolelli
- (Italy) A Giannessi
0
7
[10]

WC
- (Spain) D Gimeno Traver
- (Italy) GM Moroni
4
7^{7}
[3]

4
- (Argentina) F Argüello
- (Brazil) F Romboli
3
3

- (Serbia) P Krstin
- (Serbia) M Zekić
2
5

- (Italy) S Bolelli
- (Italy) A Giannessi
6
6

- (Italy) S Bolelli
- (Italy) A Giannessi
6
7

- (Italy) S Bolelli
- (Italy) A Giannessi
2
6^{7}

- (Argentina) T Lipovšek Puches
- (Argentina) JI Londero
6
6

2
- (Argentina) F Bagnis
- (Uruguay) A Behar
6
7^{9}

- (Spain) C Gómez-Herrera
- (Spain) J Martí
4
4

- (Argentina) T Lipovšek Puches
- (Argentina) JI Londero
6
6

- (Slovakia) J Kovalík
- (Spain) B Zapata Miralles
6
7^{7}

- (Slovakia) J Kovalík
- (Spain) B Zapata Miralles
2
4

3
- (Argentina) F Agamenone
- (Spain) E López Pérez
4
6^{5}

- (Argentina) T Lipovšek Puches
- (Argentina) JI Londero

- (Uruguay) M Cuevas
- (Bolivia) H Dellien
6
6

2
- (Argentina) F Bagnis
- (Uruguay) A Behar
w/o

WC
- (Argentina) Patricio Heras
- (Uruguay) S Maresca
2
3

- (Uruguay) M Cuevas
- (Bolivia) H Dellien

Alt
- (Argentina) MF Descotte
- (Argentina) JP Paz
1
3

2
- (Argentina) F Bagnis
- (Uruguay) A Behar
w/o

2
- (Argentina) F Bagnis
- (Uruguay) A Behar
6
6
