= 2020 Punta Open =

- Date: 27 January – 2 February
- Edition: 3rd
- Surface: Clay
- Location: Punta del Este, Uruguay

Champions

Singles
- (Brazil) Thiago Monteiro

Doubles
- (Brazil) Orlando Luz / (Brazil) Rafael Matos
← 2019 ·	Punta Open	· 2024 →

The 2020 Punta Open was a professional tennis tournament played on clay courts. It was the third edition of the tournament which was part of the 2020 ATP Challenger Tour. It took place in Punta del Este, Uruguay between 27 January and 2 February 2020.

== Singles main-draw entrants ==
=== Seeds ===
Country	Player	Rank^{1}	Seed
ITA	Marco Cecchinato	77	1
BRA	Thiago Monteiro	86	2
SVK	Andrej Martin	105	3
ITA	Gianluca Mager	117	4
ARG	Federico Coria	119	5
ARG	Facundo Bagnis	135	6
POR	Pedro Sousa	141	7
PER	Juan Pablo Varillas	143	8
ITA	Alessandro Giannessi	147	9
POR	João Domingues	171	10
ESP	Carlos Taberner	188	11
ARG	Andrea Collarini	192	12
ESP	Mario Vilella Martínez	196	13
ARG	Facundo Mena	204	14
BRA	Thiago Seyboth Wild	205	15
ARG	Francisco Cerúndolo	228	16

- ^{1} Rankings are as of 20 January 2020.

=== Other entrants ===
The following players received wildcards into the singles main draw:

- (Uruguay) Martín Cuevas
- (Uruguay) Juan Martín Fumeaux
- (Argentina) Mariano Kestelboim
- (Denmark) Holger Rune
- (Argentina) Thiago Agustín Tirante

The following player received entry into the singles main draw using a protected ranking:

- ~~(Chile) Gonzalo Lama~~

The following players received entry from the qualifying draw:

- (Peru) Sergio Galdós
- (Brazil) Gilbert Klier Júnior

The following player received entry as a lucky loser:

- (Uruguay) Emiliano Troche

== Champions ==
=== Singles ===
- (Brazil) Thiago Monteiro def. (Italy) Marco Cecchinato 7–6^{(7–3)}, 6–7^{(6–8)}, 7–5.

=== Doubles ===
- (Brazil) Orlando Luz / (Brazil) Rafael Matos def. (Argentina) Juan Manuel Cerúndolo / (Argentina) Thiago Agustín Tirante 6–4, 6–2.
