= 2018 Punta Open – Singles =

Singles
- 2018 Punta Open

Final
- Champion: (Argentina) Guido Andreozzi
- Runner-up: (Italy) Simone Bolelli
- Score: 3–6, 6–4, 6–3

Events
| Singles | Doubles |
| Punta Open | · 2019 → |

This was the first edition of the tournament.

Guido Andreozzi won the title after defeating Simone Bolelli 3–6, 6–4, 6–3 in the final.

== Seeds ==
1. (Serbia) Laslo Đere (first round)
2. (Portugal) Pedro Sousa (second round)
3. (Slovakia) Andrej Martin (second round)
4. (Slovakia) Jozef Kovalík (quarterfinals)
5. (Italy) Alessandro Giannessi (semifinals)
6. (Italy) Simone Bolelli (final)
7. (Spain) Carlos Taberner (second round)
8. (Argentina) Facundo Bagnis (first round)

== Draw ==
=== Key ===
- Q = Qualifier
- WC = Wild card
- LL = Lucky loser
- Alt = Alternate
- SE = Special exempt
- PR = Protected ranking
- ITF = ITF entry
- JE = Junior exempt
- w/o = Walkover
- r = Retired
- d = Defaulted
- SR = Special ranking

=== Finals ===
Semifinals
6 | (Italy) Simone Bolelli | 6 | 7
5 | (Italy) Alessandro Giannessi | 2 | 5
(Argentina) Guido Andreozzi | 6 | 6^{5} | 6
(Kazakhstan) Dmitry Popko | 3 | 7^{7} | 4

Final
6 | (Italy) Simone Bolelli | 6 | 4 | 3
(Argentina) Guido Andreozzi | 3 | 6 | 6

=== Top half ===
First round
1 | (Serbia) L Đere | 3 | 6^{8}
(Serbia) P Krstin | 6 | 7^{10}
(Argentina) F Argüello | 4 | 2
(Italy) F Gaio | 6 | 6
Q | (Italy) GM Moroni | 7^{7} | 6
Q | (Spain) C Gómez-Herrera | 6^{1} | 4
WC | (Uruguay) S Maresca | 2 | 1
6 | (Italy) S Bolelli | 6 | 6
4 | (Slovakia) J Kovalík | 6 | 6
(Uruguay) M Cuevas | 2 | 4
(Spain) J Martí | 6 | 1 | 5
(Argentina) A Collarini | 3 | 6 | 7
Q | (Argentina) Juan Ignacio Galarza | 5 | 6 | 7
WC | (Argentina) Patricio Heras | 7 | 2 | 5
(Bolivia) H Dellien | 6^{5} | 6 | 4
5 | (Italy) A Giannessi | 7^{7} | 4 | 6

Second round
(Serbia) P Krstin | 2 | 6 | 4
(Italy) F Gaio | 6 | 3 | 6
Q | (Italy) GM Moroni | 0 | 4
6 | (Italy) S Bolelli | 6 | 6
4 | (Slovakia) J Kovalík | 6 | 6
(Argentina) A Collarini | 4 | 2
Q | (Argentina) JI Galarza | 0 | 4
5 | (Italy) A Giannessi | 6 | 6

Quarterfinals
(Italy) F Gaio | 3 | 3
6 | (Italy) S Bolelli | 6 | 6
4 | (Slovakia) J Kovalík | 6^{2} | 6 | 6^{5}
5 | (Italy) A Giannessi | 7^{7} | 2 | 7^{7}

Semifinals
6 | (Italy) S Bolelli | 6 | 7
5 | (Italy) A Giannessi | 2 | 5

=== Bottom half ===
First round
7 | (Spain) C Taberner | 6 | 7^{7}
WC | (Spain) D Gimeno Traver | 4 | 6^{4}
(Chile) C Garín | 6 | 7^{7}
(Serbia) M Zekić | 4 | 6^{4}
(Argentina) G Andreozzi | 2 | 7^{7} | 6
(Portugal) João Monteiro | 6 | 6^{3} | 4
(France) M Bourgue | 5 | 5
3 | (Slovakia) A Martin | 7 | 7
8 | (Argentina) F Bagnis | 4 | 6 | 6^{3}
(Kazakhstan) D Popko | 6 | 3 | 7^{7}
(Belgium) A De Greef | 2^{r}
Q | (Argentina) JI Londero | 5
(Spain) E López Pérez | 6 | 6
WC | (Uruguay) N Xiviller | 4 | 0
(Spain) B Zapata Miralles | 6 | 3 | 1
2 | (Portugal) P Sousa | 3 | 6 | 6

Second round
7 | (Spain) C Taberner | 6 | 1 | 0
(Chile) C Garín | 4 | 6 | 6
(Argentina) G Andreozzi | 6 | 6
3 | (Slovakia) A Martin | 4 | 4
(Kazakhstan) D Popko | 2 | 6 | 6
Q | (Argentina) JI Londero | 6 | 4 | 4
(Spain) E López Pérez | 6 | 7
2 | (Portugal) P Sousa | 3 | 5

Quarterfinals
(Chile) C Garín | 0 | 4
(Argentina) G Andreozzi | 6 | 6
(Kazakhstan) D Popko | 6 | 6
(Spain) E López Pérez | 3 | 4

Semifinals
(Argentina) G Andreozzi | 6 | 6^{5} | 6
(Kazakhstan) D Popko | 3 | 7^{7} | 4
