= 2025 Punta Open – Doubles =

Doubles
- 2025 Punta Open

Final
- Champions: (Brazil) Gustavo Heide (Brazil) João Lucas Reis da Silva
- Runners-up: (Argentina) Facundo Mena (Argentina) Marco Trungelliti
- Score: 6–2, 6–3

Events
Singles	Doubles
- Punta Open

Murkel Dellien and Federico Agustín Gómez were the defending champions but only Dellien chose to defend his title, partnering Juan Carlos Prado Ángelo. They withdrew before their first round match.

Gustavo Heide and João Lucas Reis da Silva won the title after defeating Facundo Mena and Marco Trungelliti 6–2, 6–3 in the final.

== Seeds ==
1. (Bolivia) Boris Arias / (Bolivia) Federico Zeballos (quarterfinals)
2. (Argentina) Guido Andreozzi / (Argentina) Mariano Kestelboim (quarterfinals)
3. (Brazil) Mateus Alves / (Brazil) Daniel Dutra da Silva (first round)
4. (Brazil) Luís Britto / (Uruguay) Franco Roncadelli (first round, retired)

== Draw ==
Key

- Q = Qualifier
- WC = Wild card
- LL = Lucky loser
- Alt = Alternate
- ITF = ITF entry
- PR = Protected ranking
- SR = Special ranking
- SE = Special exempt
- JE = Junior exempt
- JR = Junior Accelerator Programme entrant
- CO = College Accelerator Programme entrant
- NG = Next Gen Accelerator Program entrant
- w/o = Walkover
- r = Retired
- d = Defaulted

=== Draw ===
First round
1	(Bolivia) B Arias (Bolivia) F Zeballos	6	6
(Argentina) A Collarini (Argentina) R Olivo	0	3
Alt	(Netherlands) M Houkes (Argentina) S Rodríguez Taverna	6	2	[6]
(Argentina) F Mena (Argentina) M Trungelliti	3	6	[10]
3	(Brazil) M Alves (Brazil) D Dutra da Silva	6^{7}	4
PR	(Peru) A Huertas del Pino (Peru) C Huertas del Pino	7^{9}	6
(Uruguay) I Carou (Bolivia) H Dellien	w/o
Alt	(Argentina) LE Ambrogi (Argentina) RA Burruchaga
(France) G Debru (Paraguay) AD Vallejo	6^{6}	5
Alt	(Argentina) V Aboian (Argentina) L Midón	7^{8}	7
(Colombia) DE Galán (Spain) C Taberner	7	0
4	(Brazil) L Britto (Uruguay) F Roncadelli	5	0^{r}
(Brazil) G Heide (Brazil) JL Reis da Silva	6^{8}	6	[10]
WC	(Uruguay) Federico Aguilar Cardozo (Uruguay) J Aguilar Cardozo	7^{10}	1	[7]
WC	(Italy) M Cecchinato (Italy) A Pellegrino	4	6^{3}
2	(Argentina) G Andreozzi (Argentina) M Kestelboim	6	7^{7}

Quarterfinals
1	(Bolivia) B Arias (Bolivia) F Zeballos	7^{7}	3	[7]
(Argentina) F Mena (Argentina) M Trungelliti	6^{4}	6	[10]
PR	(Peru) A Huertas del Pino (Peru) C Huertas del Pino	6	6
(Uruguay) I Carou (Bolivia) H Dellien	4	2
Alt	(Argentina) V Aboian (Argentina) L Midón
(Colombia) DE Galán (Spain) C Taberner	w/o
(Brazil) G Heide (Brazil) JL Reis da Silva	6	5	[10]
2	(Argentina) G Andreozzi (Argentina) M Kestelboim	3	7	[8]

Semifinals
(Argentina) F Mena (Argentina) M Trungelliti	6	6
PR	(Peru) A Huertas del Pino (Peru) C Huertas del Pino	4	2
(Colombia) DE Galán (Spain) C Taberner	1	2
(Brazil) G Heide (Brazil) JL Reis da Silva	6	6

Final
(Argentina) F Mena (Argentina) M Trungelliti	2	3
(Brazil) G Heide (Brazil) JL Reis da Silva	6	6
