= 2011 Recife Open Internacional de Tenis – Singles =

Singles
- 2011 Recife Open Internacional de Tenis

Final
- Champion: (Brazil) Ricardo Mello
- Runner-up: (Brazil) Rogério Dutra da Silva
- Score: 7–6^{(7–5)}, 6–3

Events
| Singles | Doubles |
| ← 2010 · | Recife Open Internacional de Tenis | · 2012 → |

1st seed Ricardo Mello won the title, defeating his compatriot and 2nd seed Rogério Dutra da Silva 7–6^{(7–5)}, 6–3 in the final.

== Seeds ==
1. (Brazil) Ricardo Mello (champion)
2. (Brazil) Rogério Dutra da Silva (final)
3. (Brazil) Júlio Silva (semifinals)
4. (Germany) Denis Gremelmayr (quarterfinals, retired)
5. (Portugal) Gastão Elias (first round)
6. (Chile) Jorge Aguilar (second round)
7. (Brazil) Ricardo Hocevar (first round, retired)
8. (Germany) Peter Gojowczyk (quarterfinals, retired due to sickness)

== Draw ==
=== Key ===
- Q = Qualifier
- WC = Wild card
- LL = Lucky loser
- Alt = Alternate
- SE = Special exempt
- PR = Protected ranking
- ITF = ITF entry
- JE = Junior exempt
- w/o = Walkover
- r = Retired
- d = Defaulted
- SR = Special ranking

=== Finals ===
Semifinals
1 | (Brazil) Ricardo Mello | 6 | 6
(Brazil) Caio Zampieri | 3 | 3
3 | (Brazil) Júlio Silva | 3 | 3
2 | (Brazil) Rogério Dutra da Silva | 6 | 6

Final
1 | (Brazil) Ricardo Mello | 7^{7} | 6
2 | (Brazil) Rogério Dutra da Silva | 6^{5} | 3

=== Top half ===
First round
1 | (Brazil) R Mello | 6 | 6
WC | (Brazil) J Pereira | 2 | 4
(Sweden) C Lindell | 6^{5} | 3
(Peru) D Beretta | 7^{7} | 6
(Uruguay) M Felder | 7^{7} | 6
(Brazil) L Kirche | 6^{3} | 0
(Argentina) Nicolás Pastor | 5 | 3
8 | (Germany) P Gojowczyk | 7 | 6
4 | (Germany) D Gremelmayr | 7^{7} | 6
WC | (Brazil) T Alves | 6^{1} | 2
WC | (Brazil) JP Sorgi | 6^{2} | 3
WC | (Brazil) B Sant'anna | 7^{7} | 6
(Brazil) Eládio Ribeiro Neto | 3 | 2
Q | (Argentina) Joaquín-Jesús Monteferrario | 6 | 6
(Brazil) C Zampieri | 7^{7} | 3
7 | (Brazil) R Hocevar | 6^{3} | 2^{r}

Second round
1 | (Brazil) R Mello | 6 | 6
(Peru) D Beretta | 3 | 4
(Uruguay) M Felder | 5 | 1
8 | (Germany) P Gojowczyk | 7 | 6
4 | (Germany) D Gremelmayr | 6 | 6
WC | (Brazil) B Sant'anna | 1 | 2
Q | (Argentina) J-J Monteferrario | 4 | 7^{8} | 1
(Brazil) C Zampieri | 6 | 6^{6} | 6

Quarterfinals
1 | (Brazil) R Mello | 5 | 6 | 2
8 | (Germany) P Gojowczyk | 7 | 0 | 0^{r}
4 | (Germany) D Gremelmayr | 6^{5} | 0^{r}
(Brazil) C Zampieri | 7^{7} | 3

Semifinals
1 | (Brazil) R Mello | 6 | 6
(Brazil) C Zampieri | 3 | 3

=== Bottom half ===
First round
6 | (Chile) J Aguilar | 7 | 6
(Brazil) A Ghem | 5 | 3
(Brazil) Rafael Camilo | 7 | 6
(Brazil) G Clézar | 5 | 3
(Brazil) T Fernandes | 3 | 1
Q | (Portugal) P Sousa | 6 | 6
(Argentina) A Velotti | 1 | 6 | 2
3 | (Brazil) J Silva | 6 | 1 | 6
5 | (Portugal) G Elias | 7^{8} | 1 | 3
(Monaco) B Balleret | 6^{6} | 6 | 6
Q | (Brazil) M Demoliner | 6 | 6
(Brazil) A Miele | 3 | 1
(Argentina) G Andreozzi | 7^{7} | 6
(Brazil) Tiago Lopes | 6^{5} | 4
Q | (Chile) N Massú | 3 | 4
2 | (Brazil) R Dutra da Silva | 6 | 6

Second round
6 | (Chile) J Aguilar | 4 | 1
(Brazil) Rafael Camilo | 6 | 6
Q | (Portugal) P Sousa | 6^{4} | 4
3 | (Brazil) J Silva | 7^{7} | 6
(Monaco) B Balleret | 6 | 3 | 6^{5}
Q | (Brazil) M Demoliner | 4 | 6 | 7^{7}
(Argentina) G Andreozzi | 4 | 3
2 | (Brazil) R Dutra da Silva | 6 | 6

Quarterfinals
(Brazil) Rafael Camilo | 3 | 4
3 | (Brazil) J Silva | 6 | 6
Q | (Brazil) M Demoliner | 5 | 3
2 | (Brazil) R Dutra da Silva | 7 | 6

Semifinals
3 | (Brazil) J Silva | 3 | 3
2 | (Brazil) R Dutra da Silva | 6 | 6
