= 2018 Punta Open =

- Date: 26 February – 4 March
- Edition: 1st
- Surface: Clay
- Location: Punta del Este, Uruguay

Champions

Singles
- (Argentina) Guido Andreozzi

Doubles
- (Argentina) Facundo Bagnis / (Uruguay) Ariel Behar
- Punta Open

The 2018 Punta Open was a professional tennis tournament played on clay courts. It was the first edition of the tournament which was part of the 2018 ATP Challenger Tour. It took place in Punta del Este, Uruguay between 26 February and 4 March 2018.

== Singles main-draw entrants ==
=== Seeds ===
Country	Player	Rank^{1}	Seed
SRB	Laslo Đere	90	1
POR	Pedro Sousa	122	2
SVK	Andrej Martin	132	3
SVK	Jozef Kovalík	149	4
ITA	Alessandro Giannessi	159	5
ITA	Simone Bolelli	171	6
ESP	Carlos Taberner	177	7
ARG	Facundo Bagnis	185	8

- ^{1} Rankings are as of 19 February 2018.

=== Other entrants ===
The following players received wildcards into the singles main draw:

- (Spain) Daniel Gimeno Traver
- (Argentina) Patricio Heras
- (Uruguay) Santiago Maresca
- (Uruguay) Nicolás Xiviller

The following players received entry from the qualifying draw:

- (Argentina) Juan Ignacio Galarza
- (Spain) Carlos Gómez-Herrera
- (Argentina) Juan Ignacio Londero
- (Italy) Gian Marco Moroni

== Champions ==
=== Singles ===
- (Argentina) Guido Andreozzi def. (Italy) Simone Bolelli 3–6, 6–4, 6–3.

=== Doubles ===
- (Argentina) Facundo Bagnis / (Uruguay) Ariel Behar def. (Italy) Simone Bolelli / (Italy) Alessandro Giannessi 6–2, 7–6^{(9–7)}.
