= 2025 Punta Open – Singles =

Singles
- 2025 Punta Open

Final
- Champion: (Colombia) Daniel Elahi Galán
- Runner-up: (Chile) Tomás Barrios Vera
- Score: 5–7, 6–4, 6–4

Events
Singles	Doubles
- Punta Open

Gianluca Mager was the defending champion but chose not to defend his title.

Daniel Elahi Galán won the title after defeating Tomás Barrios Vera 5–7, 6–4, 6–4 in the final.

== Seeds ==
1. (Argentina) Federico Coria (quarterfinals)
2. (Bolivia) Hugo Dellien (first round)
3. (Colombia) Daniel Elahi Galán (champion)
4. (Argentina) Juan Manuel Cerúndolo (first round)
5. (Argentina) Marco Trungelliti (quarterfinals)
6. (Argentina) Román Andrés Burruchaga (second round)
7. (Chile) Tomás Barrios Vera (final)
8. (Spain) Albert Ramos Viñolas (first round)

== Draw ==
Key

- Q = Qualifier
- WC = Wild card
- LL = Lucky loser
- Alt = Alternate
- ITF = ITF entry
- PR = Protected ranking
- SR = Special ranking
- SE = Special exempt
- JE = Junior exempt
- JR = Junior Accelerator Programme entrant
- CO = College Accelerator Programme entrant
- NG = Next Gen Accelerator Program entrant
- w/o = Walkover
- r = Retired
- d = Defaulted

=== Finals ===
Semifinals
(United States) Emilio Nava	3	3
3	(Colombia) Daniel Elahi Galán	6	6
7	(Chile) Tomás Barrios Vera	6	6
(Spain) Carlos Taberner	1	3

Final
3	(Colombia) Daniel Elahi Galán	5	6	6
7	(Chile) Tomás Barrios Vera	7	4	4

=== Top half ===
First round
1	(Argentina) F Coria	6^{1}	6	6
(Brazil) G Heide	7^{7}	3	4
WC	(Italy) M Cecchinato	2	6	6
(Ecuador) A Andrade	6	4	3
(Paraguay) AD Vallejo	6	3	2
(United States) Em Nava	3	6	6
(Italy) A Pellegrino	6	2	5
6	(Argentina) RA Burruchaga	3	6	7
3	(Colombia) DE Galán	6	6
Q	(France) M Chazal	2	2
WC	(Uruguay) J Aguilar Cardozo	3	3
(Argentina) F Mena	6	6
Q	(Argentina) R Olivo	6	0	2
(Bolivia) M Dellien	2	6	6
(Peru) G Bueno	7^{7}	6^{5}	6
8	(Spain) A Ramos Viñolas	6^{5}	7^{7}	0

Second round
1	(Argentina) F Coria	6	6
WC	(Italy) M Cecchinato	2	3
(United States) Em Nava	6	6
6	(Argentina) RA Burruchaga	1	4
3	(Colombia) DE Galán	6	6
(Argentina) F Mena	4	4
(Bolivia) M Dellien	6^{4}	3
(Peru) G Bueno	7^{7}	6

Quarterfinals
1	(Argentina) F Coria	6	3	3
(United States) Em Nava	3	6	6
3	(Colombia) DE Galán	7^{7}	6
(Peru) G Bueno	6^{5}	4

Semifinals
(United States) Em Nava	3	3
3	(Colombia) DE Galán	6	6

=== Bottom half ===
First round
7	(Chile) T Barrios Vera	3	6	7^{9}
Alt	(Ecuador) Á Guillén Meza	6	4	6^{7}
(Argentina) A Collarini	5	7^{7}	2
LL	(Netherlands) M Houkes	7	6^{5}	6
Alt	(Argentina) S Rodríguez Taverna	4	2
Q	(Argentina) GA Olivieri	6	6
Q	(Argentina) L Midón	6	6
4	(Argentina) JM Cerúndolo	2	2
5	(Argentina) M Trungelliti	6	7^{7}
Q	(Brazil) M Alves	4	6^{2}
WC	(Uruguay) F Roncadelli	1	5
Q	(Argentina) JB Torres	6	7
(Argentina) JP Ficovich	4	7	0
(France) G Debru	6	5	6
(Spain) C Taberner	6	6
2	(Bolivia) H Dellien	4	2

Second round
7	(Chile) T Barrios Vera	4	6	6
LL	(Netherlands) M Houkes	6	4	3
Q	(Argentina) GA Olivieri	4	1
Q	(Argentina) L Midón	6	6
5	(Argentina) M Trungelliti	7^{7}	7
Q	(Argentina) JB Torres	6^{5}	5
(France) G Debru	2	6	5
(Spain) C Taberner	6	3	7

Quarterfinals
7	(Chile) T Barrios Vera	6	7^{8}
Q	(Argentina) L Midón	0	6^{6}
5	(Argentina) M Trungelliti	7^{7}	2	4
(Spain) C Taberner	6^{5}	6	6

Semifinals
7	(Chile) T Barrios Vera	6	6
(Spain) C Taberner	1	3
