= 2011 Recife Open Internacional de Tenis =

- Date: 26 September–2 October
- Edition: 1st
- Location: Recife, Brazil

Champions

Singles
- (Brazil) Ricardo Mello

Doubles
- (Argentina) Guido Andreozzi / (Uruguay) Marcel Felder
Recife Open Internacional de Tenis	· 2012 →

The 2011 Recife Open Internacional de Tenis was a professional tennis tournament played on hard courts. It was the first edition of the tournament which was part of the 2011 ATP Challenger Tour. It took place in Recife, Brazil between 26 September and 2 October 2011.

== ATP entrants ==
=== Seeds ===
Country	Player	Rank^{1}	Seed
BRA	Ricardo Mello	121	1
BRA	Rogério Dutra da Silva	122	2
BRA	Júlio Silva	163	3
GER	Denis Gremelmayr	166	4
POR	Gastão Elias	226	5
CHI	Jorge Aguilar	238	6
BRA	Ricardo Hocevar	250	7
GER	Peter Gojowczyk	299	8

- ^{1} Rankings are as of September 19, 2011.

=== Other entrants ===
The following players received wildcards into the singles main draw:

- (Brazil) Thiago Alves
- (Brazil) José Pereira
- (Brazil) Bruno Sant'anna
- (Brazil) João Pedro Sorgi

The following players received entry from the qualifying draw:

- (Brazil) Marcelo Demoliner
- (Chile) Nicolás Massú
- (Argentina) Joaquín-Jesús Monteferrario
- (Portugal) Pedro Sousa

== Champions ==
=== Singles ===
(Brazil) Ricardo Mello def. (Brazil) Rogério Dutra da Silva, 7–6^{(7–5)}, 6–3

=== Doubles ===
(Argentina) Guido Andreozzi / (Uruguay) Marcel Felder def. (Brazil) Rodrigo Grilli / (Brazil) André Miele, 6–3, 6–3
