= 2011 Recife Open Internacional de Tenis – Doubles =

Doubles
- 2011 Recife Open Internacional de Tenis

Final
- Champions: (Argentina) Guido Andreozzi (Uruguay) Marcel Felder
- Runners-up: (Brazil) Rodrigo Grilli (Brazil) André Miele
- Score: 6–3, 6–3

Events
Singles	Doubles
← 2010 ·	Recife Open Internacional de Tenis	· 2012 →

Guido Andreozzi and Marcel Felder won the title, defeating 1st seeds Rodrigo Grilli and André Miele 6–3, 6–3 in the final.

== Seeds ==
1. (Brazil) Rodrigo Grilli / (Brazil) André Miele (final)
2. (Argentina) Guido Andreozzi / (Uruguay) Marcel Felder (champions)
3. (Brazil) Guilherme Clézar / (Brazil) André Ghem (first round)
4. (Brazil) Leonardo Kirche / (Brazil) Diego Matos (first round)

== Draw ==
=== Key ===
- Q = Qualifier
- WC = Wild card
- LL = Lucky loser
- Alt = Alternate
- SE = Special exempt
- PR = Protected ranking
- ITF = ITF entry
- JE = Junior exempt
- w/o = Walkover
- r = Retired
- d = Defaulted
- SR = Special ranking

=== Draw ===
First round
1	(Brazil) R Grilli (Brazil) A Miele	6	6
WC	(Brazil) Victor Maynard (Brazil) Nicolás Santos	4	3
(Argentina) Nicolás Pastor (Argentina) A Velotti	3	4
WC	(Brazil) Fernando Albuquerque (Brazil) Rafael Saraiva	6	6
4	(Brazil) L Kirche (Brazil) Diego Matos	3	4
WC	(Brazil) M Demoliner (Brazil) M Torres	6	6
(Brazil) Rafael Camilo (Brazil) T Fernandes	4	6	[10]
Alt	(Portugal) G Elias (Brazil) Jaime Oncins	6	1	[5]
(Germany) P Gojowczyk (Germany) D Gremelmayr	4	4
(Brazil) R Mello (Brazil) J Silva	6	6
(Peru) D Beretta (Uruguay) M Cuevas	6	6
3	(Brazil) G Clézar (Brazil) A Ghem	2	2
(Argentina) Joaquín-Jésus Monteferrario (Brazil) J Pereira	3	4
(Brazil) Fabiano de Paula (Brazil) C Zampieri	6	6
(Chile) J Aguilar (Chile) N Massú	2	2
2	(Argentina) G Andreozzi (Uruguay) M Felder	6	6

Quarterfinals
1	(Brazil) R Grilli (Brazil) A Miele	6	7^{7}
WC	(Brazil) F Albuquerque (Brazil) R Saraiva	4	6^{5}
WC	(Brazil) M Demoliner (Brazil) M Torres	w/o
(Brazil) R Camilo (Brazil) T Fernandes
(Brazil) R Mello (Brazil) J Silva	w/o
(Peru) D Beretta (Uruguay) M Cuevas
(Brazil) F de Paula (Brazil) C Zampieri	5	2
2	(Argentina) G Andreozzi (Uruguay) M Felder	7	6

Semifinals
1	(Brazil) R Grilli (Brazil) A Miele	6	4	[10]
WC	(Brazil) M Demoliner (Brazil) M Torres	2	6	[3]
(Brazil) R Mello (Brazil) J Silva	4	6^{4}
2	(Argentina) G Andreozzi (Uruguay) M Felder	6	7^{7}

Final
1	(Brazil) R Grilli (Brazil) A Miele	3	3
2	(Argentina) G Andreozzi (Uruguay) M Felder	6	6
