= 2025 Punta Open =

- Date: 20 – 26 January
- Edition: 5th
- Prize money: $100,000
- Surface: Clay
- Location: Punta del Este, Uruguay

Champions

Singles
- (Colombia) Daniel Elahi Galán

Doubles
- (Brazil) Gustavo Heide / (Brazil) João Lucas Reis da Silva
- Punta Open

The 2025 Punta del Este Open was a professional men's tennis tournament played on clay courts that took place between 20 and 26 January in Punta del Este, Uruguay. It was the fifth edition of the tournament and was part of the 2025 ATP Challenger Tour 75.

== Singles main-draw entrants ==
=== Seeds ===
Country	Player	Rank^{1}	Seed
ARG	Federico Coria	96	1
BOL	Hugo Dellien	123	2
COL	Daniel Elahi Galán	128	3
ARG	Juan Manuel Cerúndolo	139	4
ARG	Marco Trungelliti	140	5
ARG	Román Andrés Burruchaga	151	6
CHI	Tomás Barrios Vera	152	7
ESP	Albert Ramos Viñolas	159	8

- ^{1} Rankings are as of 13 January 2025.

=== Other entrants ===
The following players received wildcards into the singles main draw:

- (Uruguay) Joaquín Aguilar Cardozo
- (Italy) Marco Cecchinato
- (Uruguay) Franco Roncadelli

The following players received entry into the singles main draw as alternates:

- (Ecuador) Álvaro Guillén Meza
- (Argentina) Santiago Rodríguez Taverna

The following players received entry from the qualifying draw:

- (Brazil) Mateus Alves
- (France) Maxime Chazal
- (Argentina) Lautaro Midón
- (Argentina) Genaro Alberto Olivieri
- (Argentina) Renzo Olivo
- (Argentina) Juan Bautista Torres

The following player received entry as a lucky loser:

- (Netherlands) Max Houkes

== Champions ==
=== Singles ===
- (Colombia) Daniel Elahi Galán def. (Chile) Tomás Barrios Vera 5–7, 6–4, 6–4.

=== Doubles ===
- (Brazil) Gustavo Heide / (Brazil) João Lucas Reis da Silva def. (Argentina) Facundo Mena / (Argentina) Marco Trungelliti 6–2, 6–3.
