= 2024 Punta Open – Singles =

Singles
- 2024 Punta Open

Final
- Champion: (Italy) Gianluca Mager
- Runner-up: (Argentina) Thiago Agustín Tirante
- Score: 6–7^{(5–7)}, 6–2, 6–0

Events
Singles	Doubles
- Punta Open

Thiago Monteiro was the defending champion but lost in the quarterfinals to Román Andrés Burruchaga.

Gianluca Mager won the title after defeating Thiago Agustín Tirante 6–7^{(5–7)}, 6–2, 6–0 in the final.

== Seeds ==
1. (Argentina) Federico Coria (first round)
2. (Chile) Cristian Garín (first round)
3. (Chile) Tomás Barrios Vera (first round)
4. (Argentina) Thiago Agustín Tirante (final)
5. (Brazil) Thiago Monteiro (quarterfinals)
6. (Argentina) Francisco Comesaña (second round)
7. (Argentina) Mariano Navone (first round)
8. (Italy) Luciano Darderi (second round)

== Draw ==
Key

- Q = Qualifier
- WC = Wild card
- LL = Lucky loser
- Alt = Alternate
- ITF = ITF entry
- PR = Protected ranking
- SR = Special ranking
- SE = Special exempt
- JE = Junior exempt
- JR = Junior Accelerator Programme entrant
- CO = College Accelerator Programme entrant
- NG = Next Gen Accelerator Program entrant
- w/o = Walkover
- r = Retired
- d = Defaulted

=== Finals ===
Semifinals
(Argentina) Román Andrés Burruchaga
4	(Argentina) Thiago Agustín Tirante	w/o
Q	(Italy) Gianluca Mager	6	6
(Italy) Marco Cecchinato	3	1

Final
4	(Argentina) Thiago Agustín Tirante	7^{7}	2	0
Q	(Italy) Gianluca Mager	6^{5}	6	6

=== Top half ===
First round
1	(Argentina) F Coria	4	4
Q	(Argentina) R Olivo	6	6
(Argentina) RA Burruchaga	6	7
LL	(Ecuador) Á Guillén Meza	4	5
(Argentina) F Bagnis	6	3	6
(Austria) L Neumayer	3	6	4
Q	(Argentina) FA Gómez	1	4
5	(Brazil) T Monteiro	6	6
4	(Argentina) TA Tirante	6	6
WC	(Uruguay) F Roncadelli	2	4
Alt	(Brazil) G Heide	6	6
(Argentina) A Collarini	3	3
Q	(United Kingdom) F Gill	3	4
Q	(Bolivia) M Dellien	6	6
(Argentina) C Ugo Carabelli	6	7^{7}
7	(Argentina) M Navone	4	6^{3}

Second round
Q	(Argentina) R Olivo	6	5	1
(Argentina) RA Burruchaga	4	7	6
(Argentina) F Bagnis	2	3
5	(Brazil) T Monteiro	6	6
4	(Argentina) TA Tirante	4	6	6
Alt	(Brazil) G Heide	6	3	2
Q	(Bolivia) M Dellien	6	7^{7}
(Argentina) C Ugo Carabelli	4	6^{5}

Quarterfinals
(Argentina) RA Burruchaga	6	5	7^{8}
5	(Brazil) T Monteiro	3	7	6^{6}
4	(Argentina) TA Tirante	6	6
Q	(Bolivia) M Dellien	3	0

Semifinals
(Argentina) RA Burruchaga
4	(Argentina) TA Tirante	w/o

=== Bottom half ===
First round
6	(Argentina) F Comesaña	6	6
(Brazil) J Fonseca	3	2
Q	(Italy) G Mager	3	7^{7}	7^{7}
I Gakhov	6	6^{5}	6^{3}
(Argentina) JM Cerúndolo	1	6	6
(Italy) A Giannessi	6	4	1
Q	(Spain) N Sánchez Izquierdo	3	6	6
3	(Chile) T Barrios Vera	6	4	4
8	(Italy) L Darderi	6	7
PR	(Argentina) N Kicker	3	5
(Moldova) R Albot	6	6
(Argentina) GA Olivieri	4	2
WC	(Uruguay) J Aguilar Cardozo	6	4	5
(Argentina) S Rodríguez Taverna	0	6	7
(Italy) M Cecchinato	6	6
2/WC	(Chile) C Garín	3	2

Second round
6	(Argentina) F Comesaña	6^{8}	4
Q	(Italy) G Mager	7^{10}	6
(Argentina) JM Cerúndolo	6	6
Q	(Spain) N Sánchez Izquierdo	1	3
8	(Italy) L Darderi	5	4
(Moldova) R Albot	7	6
(Argentina) S Rodríguez Taverna	6^{4}	1
(Italy) M Cecchinato	7^{7}	6

Quarterfinals
Q	(Italy) G Mager	6	6
(Argentina) JM Cerúndolo	3	2
(Moldova) R Albot	6	2	3
(Italy) M Cecchinato	4	6	6

Semifinals
Q	(Italy) G Mager	6	6
(Italy) M Cecchinato	3	1
