= 2024 Punta Open – Doubles =

Doubles
- 2024 Punta Open

Final
- Champions: (Bolivia) Murkel Dellien (Argentina) Federico Agustín Gómez
- Runners-up: (Argentina) Guido Andreozzi (Argentina) Guillermo Durán
- Score: 6–3, 6–2

Events
Singles	Doubles
- Punta Open

Orlando Luz and Rafael Matos were the defending champions but only Luz chose to defend his title, partnering Marcelo Zormann. Luz lost in the first round to Radu Albot and Alexandr Cozbinov.

Murkel Dellien and Federico Agustín Gómez won the title after defeating Guido Andreozzi and Guillermo Durán 6–3, 6–2 in the final.

== Seeds ==
1. (Bolivia) Boris Arias / (Bolivia) Federico Zeballos (quarterfinals)
2. (Argentina) Guido Andreozzi / (Argentina) Guillermo Durán (final)
3. (Brazil) Orlando Luz / (Brazil) Marcelo Zormann (first round)
4. (Bolivia) Murkel Dellien / (Argentina) Federico Agustín Gómez (champions)

== Draw ==
Key

- Q = Qualifier
- WC = Wild card
- LL = Lucky loser
- Alt = Alternate
- ITF = ITF entry
- PR = Protected ranking
- SR = Special ranking
- SE = Special exempt
- JE = Junior exempt
- JR = Junior Accelerator Programme entrant
- CO = College Accelerator Programme entrant
- NG = Next Gen Accelerator Program entrant
- w/o = Walkover
- r = Retired
- d = Defaulted

First round
1	(Bolivia) B Arias (Bolivia) F Zeballos	6	6
Alt	(Germany) Timo Stodder (Italy) Alexander Weis	1	3
(Italy) Edoardo Lavagno (Spain) N Sánchez Izquierdo	5	3
(Germany) J Schnaitter (Germany) M Wallner	7	6
4	(Bolivia) M Dellien (Argentina) FA Gómez	6	7^{7}
Alt	I Gakhov; Svyatoslav Gulin	1	6^{4}
(Argentina) H Casanova (Argentina) S Rodríguez Taverna	6	6^{5}	[10]
WC	(Uruguay) I Carou (Uruguay) F Roncadelli	4	7^{7}	[7]
(Argentina) M Kestelboim (Argentina) C Ugo Carabelli	6	6
WC	(Uruguay) Federico Aguilar Cardozo (Uruguay) J Aguilar Cardozo	4	0
Alt	(Moldova) R Albot (Moldova) A Cozbinov	3	6	[10]
3	(Brazil) O Luz (Brazil) M Zormann	6	2	[7]
(Argentina) RA Burruchaga (Argentina) JB Torres	6^{7}	7^{7}	[4]
(Italy) L Darderi (Italy) A Giannessi	7^{9}	6^{2}	[10]
(Argentina) A Collarini (Argentina) R Olivo	3	7	[10]
2	(Argentina) G Andreozzi (Argentina) G Durán	6	5	[12]

Quarterfinals
1	(Bolivia) B Arias (Bolivia) F Zeballos	3	2
(Germany) J Schnaitter (Germany) M Wallner	6	6
4	(Bolivia) M Dellien (Argentina) FA Gómez	6	6^{2}	[10]
(Argentina) H Casanova (Argentina) S Rodríguez Taverna	3	7^{7}	[7]
(Argentina) M Kestelboim (Argentina) C Ugo Carabelli	6	7
Alt	(Moldova) R Albot (Moldova) A Cozbinov	4	5
(Italy) L Darderi (Italy) A Giannessi	4	2
2	(Argentina) G Andreozzi (Argentina) G Durán	6	6

Semifinals
(Germany) J Schnaitter (Germany) M Wallner	3	4
4	(Bolivia) M Dellien (Argentina) FA Gómez	6	6
(Argentina) M Kestelboim (Argentina) C Ugo Carabelli	6^{6}	4
2	(Argentina) G Andreozzi (Argentina) G Durán	7^{8}	6

Final
4	(Bolivia) M Dellien (Argentina) FA Gómez	6	6
2	(Argentina) G Andreozzi (Argentina) G Durán	3	2
