= 2024 Punta Open =

- Date: 22 – 28 January
- Edition: 4th
- Prize money: $75,000 + H
- Surface: Clay
- Location: Punta del Este, Uruguay

Champions

Singles
- (Italy) Gianluca Mager

Doubles
- (Bolivia) Murkel Dellien / (Argentina) Federico Agustín Gómez
- Punta Open

The 2024 Punta del Este Open was a professional men's tennis tournament played on clay courts that took place between January 22 and 28 in Punta del Este, Uruguay. It was the fourth edition of the tournament and was part of the 2024 ATP Challenger Tour 75.

== Singles main-draw entrants ==
=== Seeds ===
Country	Player	Rank^{1}	Seed
ARG	Federico Coria	84	1
CHI	Cristian Garín	86	2
CHI	Tomás Barrios Vera	93	3
ARG	Thiago Agustín Tirante	118	4
BRA	Thiago Monteiro	120	5
ARG	Francisco Comesaña	121	6
ARG	Mariano Navone	125	7
ITA	Luciano Darderi	128	8

- ^{1} Rankings are as of 15 January 2024.

=== Other entrants ===
The following players received wildcards into the singles main draw:

- (Uruguay) Joaquín Aguilar Cardozo
- (Chile) Cristian Garín
- (Uruguay) Franco Roncadelli

The following player received entry into the singles main draw using a protected ranking:

- (Argentina) Nicolás Kicker

The following players received entry from the qualifying draw:

- (Bolivia) Murkel Dellien
- (United Kingdom) Felix Gill
- (Argentina) Federico Agustín Gómez
- (Italy) Gianluca Mager
- (Argentina) Renzo Olivo
- (Spain) Nikolás Sánchez Izquierdo

The following player received entry as a lucky loser:

- (Ecuador) Álvaro Guillén Meza

== Champions ==
=== Singles ===
- (Italy) Gianluca Mager def. (Argentina) Thiago Agustín Tirante 6–7^{(5–7)}, 6–2, 6–0.

=== Doubles ===
- (Bolivia) Murkel Dellien / (Argentina) Federico Agustín Gómez def. (Argentina) Guido Andreozzi / (Argentina) Guillermo Durán 6–3, 6–2.
