= 2019 Punta Open – Singles =

Singles
- 2019 Punta Open

Final
- Champion: (Brazil) Thiago Monteiro
- Runner-up: (Argentina) Facundo Argüello
- Score: 3–6, 6–2, 6–3

Events
| Singles | Doubles |
- Punta Open

Guido Andreozzi was the defending champion but lost in the second round to Emilio Gómez.

Thiago Monteiro won the title after defeating Facundo Argüello 3–6, 6–2, 6–3 in the final.

== Seeds ==
All seeds receive a bye into the second round.

1. (Argentina) Guido Andreozzi (second round)
2. (Argentina) Juan Ignacio Londero (quarterfinals)
3. (Bolivia) Hugo Dellien (quarterfinals)
4. (Brazil) Thiago Monteiro (champion)
5. (Brazil) Rogério Dutra Silva (third round)
6. (Argentina) Facundo Bagnis (semifinals)
7. (Italy) Gianluigi Quinzi (quarterfinals)
8. (Italy) Alessandro Giannessi (second round)
9. (Slovakia) Andrej Martin (third round)
10. (Belgium) Kimmer Coppejans (quarterfinals)
11. (Argentina) Facundo Argüello (final)
12. (Croatia) Nino Serdarušić (third round)
13. (Argentina) Pedro Cachin (second round)
14. (Argentina) Federico Coria (second round)
15. (Argentina) Andrea Collarini (third round)
16. (Uruguay) Martín Cuevas (second round)

== Draw ==
Key

- Q = Qualifier
- WC = Wild card
- LL = Lucky loser
- Alt = Alternate
- ITF = ITF entry
- PR = Protected ranking
- SR = Special ranking
- SE = Special exempt
- JE = Junior exempt
- JR = Junior Accelerator Programme entrant
- CO = College Accelerator Programme entrant
- NG = Next Gen Accelerator Program entrant
- w/o = Walkover
- r = Retired
- d = Defaulted

=== Finals ===
Quarterfinals
(Ecuador) Emilio Gómez | 6 | 2 | 6
10 | (Belgium) Kimmer Coppejans | 4 | 6 | 3
4 | (Brazil) Thiago Monteiro | 7 | 7
7 | (Italy) Gianluigi Quinzi | 5 | 5
6 | (Argentina) Facundo Bagnis | 7 | 4 | 6
3 | (Bolivia) Hugo Dellien | 5 | 6 | 1
11 | (Argentina) Facundo Argüello | 7^{7} | 3 | 6
2 | (Argentina) Juan Ignacio Londero | 6^{2} | 6 | 1

Semifinals
(Ecuador) Emilio Gómez | 6^{6} | 3
4 | (Brazil) Thiago Monteiro | 7^{8} | 6
6 | (Argentina) Facundo Bagnis | 2 | 2
11 | (Argentina) Facundo Argüello | 6 | 6

Final
4 | (Brazil) Thiago Monteiro | 3 | 6 | 6
11 | (Argentina) Facundo Argüello | 6 | 2 | 3

=== Top half ===
==== Section 1 ====
First round
(Ecuador) E Gómez | 6 | 6
(Norway) V Durasovic | 3 | 2
ITF | (Argentina) MF Descotte | 6 | 6
(Brazil) P Sakamoto | 4 | 1
Q | (Argentina) Matías Zukas | 6^{4} | 6 | 0
ITF | (Argentina) C Ugo Carabelli | 7^{7} | 2 | 6
WC | (Argentina) F Díaz Acosta | 2 | 5
(Chile) MT Barrios Vera | 6 | 7

Second round
1/WC | (Argentina) G Andreozzi | 6^{3} | 5
(Ecuador) E Gómez | 7^{7} | 7
ITF | (Argentina) MF Descotte | 5 | 5
15 | (Argentina) A Collarini | 7 | 7
10 | (Belgium) K Coppejans | 6 | 6
ITF | (Argentina) C Ugo Carabelli | 1 | 4
(Chile) MT Barrios Vera | 6 | 6
8 | (Italy) A Giannessi | 4 | 4

Third round
(Ecuador) E Gómez | 6^{7} | 6 | 6
15 | (Argentina) A Collarini | 7^{9} | 4 | 4
10 | (Belgium) K Coppejans | 6 | 7
(Chile) MT Barrios Vera | 3 | 5

Quarterfinals
(Ecuador) E Gómez | 6 | 2 | 6
10 | (Belgium) K Coppejans | 4 | 6 | 3

==== Section 2 ====
First round
(Brazil) J Souza | 6 | 6
WC | (United States) Preston Brown | 2 | 4
(Chile) G Lama | 7^{7} | 6
Alt | (Brazil) Oscar José Gutierrez | 6^{2} | 2
(Brazil) JP Sorgi | 6 | 6
(Italy) Fabrizio Ornago | 4 | 4
(Sweden) M Eriksson | 2 | 6^{3}
(Peru) JP Varillas | 6 | 7^{7}

Second round
4 | (Brazil) T Monteiro | 7^{8} | 6
(Brazil) J Souza | 6^{6} | 2
(Chile) G Lama | 7^{7} | 6
13 | (Argentina) P Cachin | 6^{5} | 1
9 | (Slovakia) A Martin | 7^{7} | 6
(Brazil) JP Sorgi | 6^{4} | 1
(Peru) JP Varillas | 7^{7} | 6^{11} | 4
7 | (Italy) G Quinzi | 6^{3} | 7^{13} | 6

Third round
4 | (Brazil) T Monteiro | 6 | 6
(Chile) G Lama | 3 | 4
9 | (Slovakia) A Martin | 4 | 7^{7} | 3
7 | (Italy) G Quinzi | 6 | 6^{4} | 6

Quarterfinals
4 | (Brazil) T Monteiro | 7 | 7
7 | (Italy) G Quinzi | 5 | 5

=== Bottom half ===
==== Section 3 ====
First round
(Brazil) J Menezes | 2 | 1
(France) A Müller | 6 | 6
(Brazil) T Seyboth Wild | 6 | 4 | 3
ITF | (Argentina) G Villanueva | 1 | 6 | 6
(Argentina) JP Ficovich | 6 | 6
WC | (Uruguay) F Llanes | 4 | 3
(Argentina) R Olivo | 6 | 7^{7}
ITF | (Argentina) H Casanova | 4 | 6^{5}

Second round
6 | (Argentina) F Bagnis | 6 | 6^{10} | 6
(France) A Müller | 1 | 7^{12} | 4
ITF | (Argentina) G Villanueva | 6^{3} | 6 | 4
12 | (Croatia) N Serdarušić | 7^{7} | 4 | 6
14 | (Argentina) F Coria | 5 | 5
(Argentina) JP Ficovich | 7 | 7
(Argentina) R Olivo | 3 | 6 | 5
3 | (Bolivia) H Dellien | 6 | 3 | 7

Third round
6 | (Argentina) F Bagnis | 6 | 6
12 | (Croatia) N Serdarušić | 0 | 2
(Argentina) JP Ficovich | 3 | 3
3 | (Bolivia) H Dellien | 6 | 6

Quarterfinals
6 | (Argentina) F Bagnis | 7 | 4 | 6
3 | (Bolivia) H Dellien | 5 | 6 | 1

==== Section 4 ====
First round
(Colombia) A González | 7 | 6
(Argentina) Juan Ignacio Galarza | 5 | 3
Q | (Chile) A Tabilo | 6 | 6
(Belgium) S Gillé | 2 | 4
Alt | (United States) Jordi Arconada | 2 | 6 | 5
WC | (Argentina) T Lipovšek Puches | 6 | 4 | 7
(Italy) A Basso | 6 | 3 | 6^{2}
(Spain) Carlos Boluda-Purkiss | 4 | 6 | 7^{7}

Second round
5 | (Brazil) R Dutra Silva | 7^{8} | 6
(Colombia) A González | 6^{6} | 2
Q | (Chile) A Tabilo | 2 | 6^{3}
11 | (Argentina) F Argüello | 6 | 7^{7}
16 | (Uruguay) M Cuevas | 6 | 6^{4} | 4
WC | (Argentina) T Lipovšek Puches | 3 | 7^{7} | 6
(Spain) C Boluda-Purkiss | 0 | 6^{5}
2 | (Argentina) JI Londero | 6 | 7^{7}

Third round
5 | (Brazil) R Dutra Silva | 3 | 4
11 | (Argentina) F Argüello | 6 | 6
WC | (Argentina) T Lipovšek Puches | 3 | 1
2 | (Argentina) JI Londero | 6 | 6

Quarterfinals
11 | (Argentina) F Argüello | 7^{7} | 3 | 6
2 | (Argentina) JI Londero | 6^{2} | 6 | 1
