= 2019 Punta Open =

- Date: 21–27 January
- Edition: 2nd
- Surface: Clay
- Location: Punta del Este, Uruguay

Champions

Singles
- (Brazil) Thiago Monteiro

Doubles
- (Argentina) Guido Andreozzi / (Argentina) Guillermo Durán
- Punta Open

The 2019 Punta Open was a professional tennis tournament played on clay courts. It was the second edition of the tournament which was part of the 2019 ATP Challenger Tour. It took place in Punta del Este, Uruguay between 21 and 27 January 2019.

== Singles main-draw entrants ==
=== Seeds ===
Country	Player	Rank^{1}	Seed
ARG	Guido Andreozzi	77	1
ARG	Juan Ignacio Londero	114	2
BOL	Hugo Dellien	123	3
BRA	Thiago Monteiro	126	4
BRA	Rogério Dutra Silva	136	5
ARG	Facundo Bagnis	152	6
ITA	Gianluigi Quinzi	154	7
ITA	Alessandro Giannessi	161	8
SVK	Andrej Martin	184	9
BEL	Kimmer Coppejans	214	10
ARG	Facundo Argüello	228	11
CRO	Nino Serdarušić	259	12
ARG	Pedro Cachin	274	13
ARG	Federico Coria	284	14
ARG	Andrea Collarini	299	15
URU	Martín Cuevas	307	16

- ^{1} Rankings are as of 14 January 2019.

=== Other entrants ===
The following players received wildcards into the singles main draw:

- (Argentina) Guido Andreozzi
- (United States) Preston Brown
- (Argentina) Facundo Díaz Acosta
- (Argentina) Tomás Lipovšek Puches
- (Uruguay) Francisco Llanes

The following players received entry into the singles main draw as alternates:

- (United States) Jordi Arconada
- (Brazil) Oscar José Gutierrez

The following players received entry into the singles main draw using their ITF World Tennis Ranking:

- (Argentina) Hernán Casanova
- (Argentina) Matías Franco Descotte
- (Argentina) Camilo Ugo Carabelli
- (Argentina) Gonzalo Villanueva

The following players received entry from the qualifying draw:

- (Chile) Alejandro Tabilo
- (Argentina) Matías Zukas

== Champions ==
=== Singles ===
- (Brazil) Thiago Monteiro def. (Argentina) Facundo Argüello 3–6, 6–2, 6–3.

=== Doubles ===
- (Argentina) Guido Andreozzi / (Argentina) Guillermo Durán def. (Belgium) Sander Gillé / (Belgium) Joran Vliegen 6–2, 6–7^{(6–8)}, [10–8].
