= 2019 Punta Open – Doubles =

Doubles
- 2019 Punta Open

Final
- Champions: (Argentina) Guido Andreozzi; (Argentina) Guillermo Durán
- Runners-up: (Belgium) Sander Gillé; (Belgium) Joran Vliegen
- Score: 6–2, 6–7^{(6–8)}, [10–8]

Events
Singles	Doubles
- Punta Open

Facundo Bagnis and Ariel Behar were the defending champions but only Bagnis chose to defend his title, partnering Franco Agamenone. Bagnis lost in the first round to Sander Gillé and Joran Vliegen.

Guido Andreozzi and Guillermo Durán won the title after defeating Gillé and Vliegen 6–2, 6–7^{(6–8)}, [10–8] in the final.

== Seeds ==
1. (Belgium) Sander Gillé / (Belgium) Joran Vliegen (final)
2. (Argentina) Guido Andreozzi / (Argentina) Guillermo Durán (champions)
3. (Serbia) Nikola Ćaćić / (Slovakia) Andrej Martin (first round)
4. (Spain) David Marrero / (Brazil) Thiago Monteiro (semifinals)

== Draw ==
Key

- Q = Qualifier
- WC = Wild card
- LL = Lucky loser
- Alt = Alternate
- ITF = ITF entry
- PR = Protected ranking
- SR = Special ranking
- SE = Special exempt
- JE = Junior exempt
- JR = Junior Accelerator Programme entrant
- CO = College Accelerator Programme entrant
- NG = Next Gen Accelerator Program entrant
- w/o = Walkover
- r = Retired
- d = Defaulted

First round

Quarterfinals

Semifinals

Final

1
- (Belgium) S Gillé
- (Belgium) J Vliegen
7
6

- (Argentina) F Agamenone
- (Argentina) F Bagnis
5
4

1
- (Belgium) S Gillé
- (Belgium) J Vliegen
6
6

- (Argentina) T Lipovšek Puches
- (Argentina) JI Londero
6^{7}
6
[11]

- (Belgium) K Coppejans
- (Croatia) N Serdarušić
3
4

- (Belgium) K Coppejans
- (Croatia) N Serdarušić
7^{9}
3
[13]

1
- (Belgium) S Gillé
- (Belgium) J Vliegen
6
7

3
- (Serbia) N Čačić
- (Slovakia) A Martin
4
3

WC
- (Colombia) A González
- (Argentina) R Olivo
3
5

- (Uruguay) M Cuevas
- (Bolivia) H Dellien
6
6

- (Uruguay) M Cuevas
- (Bolivia) H Dellien
6^{8}
7
[8]

WC
- (Colombia) A González
- (Argentina) R Olivo
6
6^{5}
[10]

WC
- (Colombia) A González
- (Argentina) R Olivo
7^{10}
5
[10]

- (Italy) A Basso
- (Italy) A Giannessi
4
7^{7}
[2]

1
- (Belgium) S Gillé
- (Belgium) J Vliegen
2
7^{8}
[8]

ITF
(Argentina) MF Descotte
(Argentina) Matías Zukas
7^{7}
7^{7}

2
- (Argentina) G Andreozzi
- (Argentina) G Durán
6
6^{6}
[10]

ITF
- (Argentina) M Kestelboim
- (Brazil) J Souza
6^{4}
6^{5}

ITF
(Argentina) MF Descotte
(Argentina) M Zukas
6
6^{2}
[4]

WC
(United States) Preston Brown
(Italy) Fabrizio Ornago
6
3
[8]

4
- (Spain) D Marrero
- (Brazil) T Monteiro
2
7^{7}
[10]

4
- (Spain) D Marrero
- (Brazil) T Monteiro
3
6
[10]

4
- (Spain) D Marrero
- (Brazil) T Monteiro
2
6
[2]

- (Argentina) F Argüello
- (Peru) S Galdós
6
6

2
- (Argentina) G Andreozzi
- (Argentina) G Durán
6
4
[10]

WC
(Uruguay) F Llanes
(Uruguay) Emiliano Troche
0
1

- (Argentina) F Argüello
- (Peru) S Galdós
3
0

- (Sweden) M Eriksson
- (Brazil) F Romboli
2
2

2
- (Argentina) G Andreozzi
- (Argentina) G Durán
6
6

2
- (Argentina) G Andreozzi
- (Argentina) G Durán
6
6
