= Recife Open Internacional de Tenis =

- 2011 Recife Open Internacional de Tenis

Defunct tennis tournament
- Location: Recife; Brazil
- Category: ATP Challenger Tour
- Surface: Hard / Outdoors
- Draw: 32S/32Q/16D
- Prize money: €50,000

The Recife Open Internacional de Tenis was a tennis tournament held in Recife, Brazil in 2011. The event was part of the ATP Challenger Tour and was played on outdoor hard courts.

== Past finals ==
=== Singles ===
Year	Champion	Runner-up	Score
2011	(Brazil) Ricardo Mello	(Brazil) Rogério Dutra da Silva	7–6^{(7–5)}, 6–3

=== Doubles ===
Year	Champions	Runners-up	Score
2011	(Argentina) Guido Andreozzi (Uruguay) Marcel Felder	(Brazil) Rodrigo Grilli (Brazil) André Miele	6–3, 6–3
