= Daniel Elahi Galán =

Colombian tennis player (born 1996)

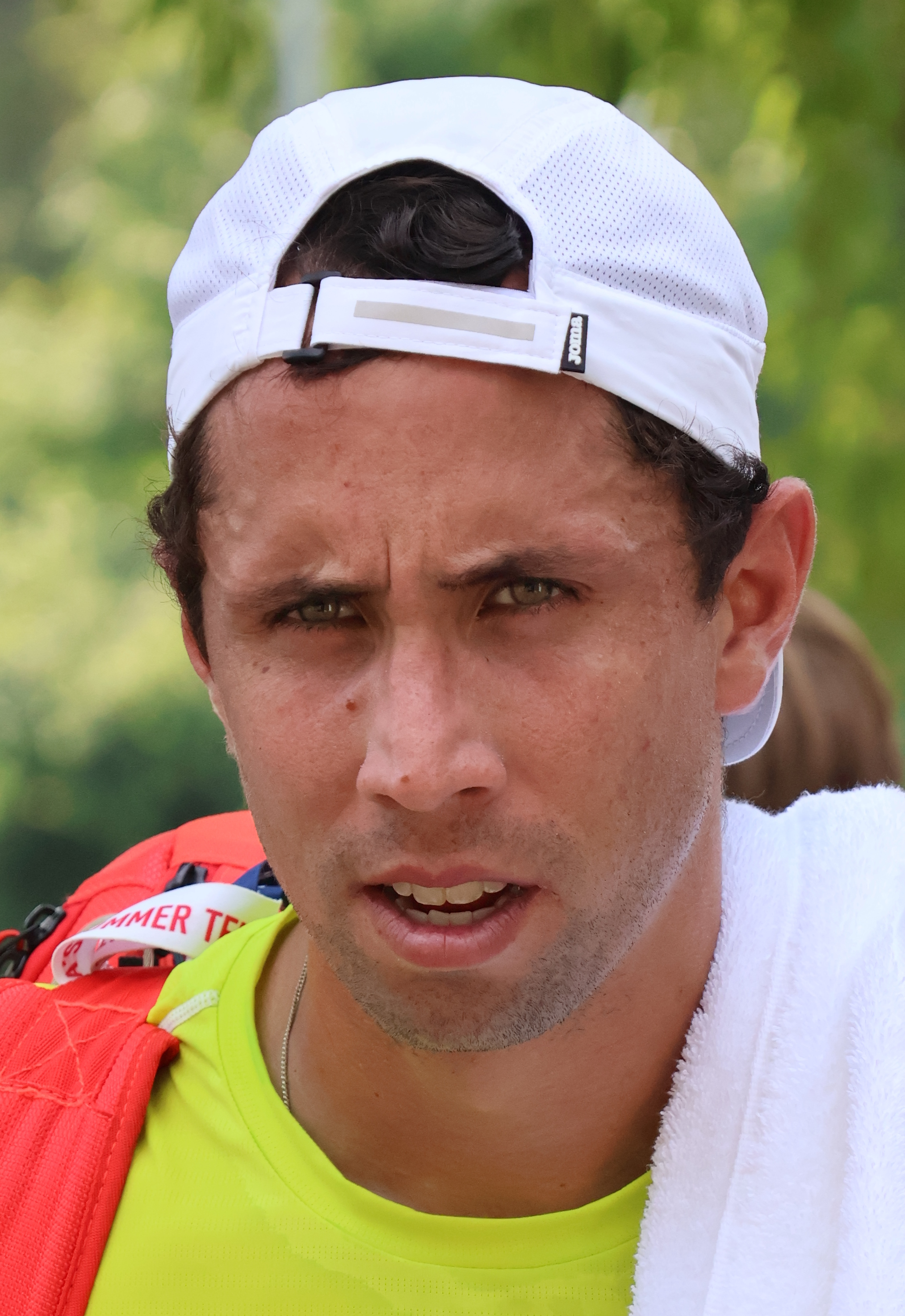
- Elahi Galán in 2024
- Full name: Daniel Elahi Galán Riveros
- Country (sports): Colombia
- Residence: Bogotá, Colombia
- Born: 18 June 1996 (age 30) Bucaramanga, Colombia
- Height: 1.91 m (6 ft 3 in)
- Turned pro: 2015
- Plays: Right-handed (two-handed backhand)
- Coach: Santos Galán
- Prize money: $ 4,099,315

Singles
- Career record: 54–79
- Career titles: 0
- Highest ranking: No. 56 (17 July 2023)
- Current ranking: No. 343 (16 November 2026)

Grand Slam singles results
- Australian Open: 2R (2024)
- French Open: 3R (2020)
- Wimbledon: 4R (2023)
- US Open: 3R (2022)

Other tournaments
- Olympic Games: 2R (2021)

Doubles
- Career record: 0–8
- Career titles: 0
- Highest ranking: No. 305 (26 February 2018)

Grand Slam doubles results
- Wimbledon: 1R (2023)
- US Open: 1R (2023)

Team competitions
- Davis Cup: 9–5
- Last updated on: 20 November 2026.

Daniel Elahi Galán Riveros (born 18 June 1996) is a Colombian professional tennis player. He reached a career-high ATP singles ranking of No. 56 on 17 July 2023. He also has a career-high doubles ranking of No. 305 achieved on 26 February 2018. He is currently the No. 2 Colombian player. His best result at a Grand Slam is a fourth-round appearance at the 2023 Wimbledon Championships.

== Personal information ==
He is part of the Colsanitas team, an organization that supports the best tennis players in Colombia.

== Professional career ==
=== 2015-2020: ATP, Grand Slam debut and third round at the French Open ===
Galán made his ATP main draw singles debut at the 2015 Claro Open Colombia where he was given a wildcard. He defeated Pere Riba in the first round.

Galán gained additional recognition after he reached the third round match at the 2020 French Open on his debut, as a lucky loser, to setup a match with top seed Novak Djokovic, his best showing at a Grand Slam thus far. He lost in straight sets (6–0, 6–3, 6–2), but his performance earned him new followers.

=== 2021: Masters 1000 debut and third round, Olympics debut ===
As a result of his first and best Masters 1000 third round showing thus far at the 2021 Miami Open, defeating 15th seed Alex de Minaur en route, and then losing to Lorenzo Sonego, he reached a career-high of World No. 110 on 5 April 2021.

Galán qualified to represent Colombia at the 2020 Summer Olympics where he was defeated by World No. 5 and eventual Olympic champion Alexander Zverev in the second round.

=== 2022: Wimbledon & US Open third rounds, first top-5 win, top 75 ===
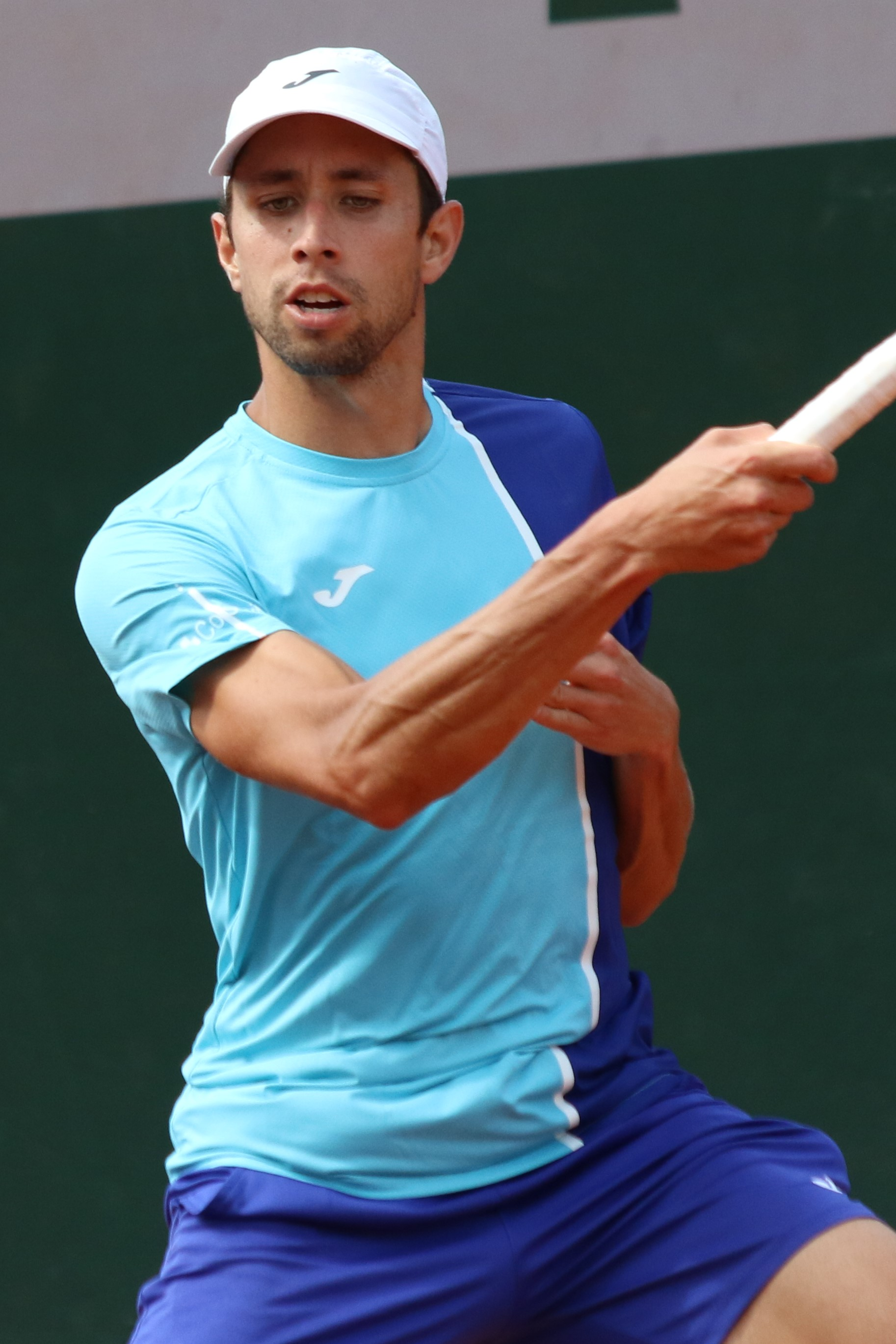
Galán at the 2022 French Open

At the 2022 Córdoba Open he reached his first ATP quarterfinal of the year as a lucky loser where he lost to top seed Diego Schwartzman.

After missing three major events, he returned to the 2022 Wimbledon Championships where he reached the second round for a second consecutive year defeating Dominik Koepfer. He moved to the third round for the first time at this Major after the withdrawal of 17th seed Roberto Bautista Agut due to a positive COVID-19 test.

He reached the top 100 at World No. 99 on 25 July 2022, after a second round showing as a qualifier at the 2022 Hamburg European Open defeating Federico Coria. At the 2022 Croatia Open Umag he defeated 2016 champion Fabio Fognini.

He made his debut at the US Open as a qualifier. In the first round, he upset world No. 5 Stefanos Tsitsipas to advance to the second round, recording his first victory over a Top-5 player and for Colombia since Iván Molina took down then-No. 3 Manuel Orantes in Tehran in 1975. Although Tsitsipas saved eight match points, Galán capitalised on his ninth. He defeated Jordan Thompson in the second round in five sets to reach the third round at this Major for the second time in his career. As a result, he moved into the top 75 in the rankings.

At the 2022 San Diego Open he reached his second quarterfinal of the season defeating fourth seed Pedro Martínez before losing to fifth seed and eventual champion Brandon Nakashima. As a result, he moved to the top 70 in the rankings No. 69 on 26 September.

He achieved an ATP career-high singles ranking of No. 67 on 28 November 2022.

=== 2023: Wimbledon fourth round, top 60 ===
In April, Galan reached the final at the 2023 Sarasota Open where he was the defending champion but lost to Daniel Altmaier.

At the 2023 Mutua Madrid Open in the first round, he played in the longest tiebreak of the ATP season thus far, falling 17–15 in 25-minutes to Alexander Bublik.

At the 2023 Wimbledon Championships he upset 24th seed Yoshihito Nishioka. Next he defeated qualifier Oscar Otte to reach a second consecutive third round. He defeated Mikael Ymer to reach his first fourth round at this Major and in his career. As a result, he moved to a new career high in the top 56 in the rankings on 17 July 2023.

=== 2024-2025: First Australian Open win ===
At the 2024 Australian Open, Galan needed almost five hours to the minute to win his first round match at this Major over local wildcard Jason Kubler. In Buenos Aires he recorded his second win of the season over wildcard Diego Schwartzman. At the 2024 U.S. Men's Clay Court Championships he set a record in the history of the tournament, by winning the longest tiebreak 15–13 in the first set on his 10th set point, defeating Benoît Paire in straight sets in his first round match.

In January 2025, at the Punta del Este Open in Uruguay, Galan claimed his fifth Challenger title and first since April 2022.

== Performance timeline ==
Key
W	F	SF	QF	#R	RR	Q#	DNQ	A	NH

(W) winner; (F) finalist; (SF) semifinalist; (QF) quarterfinalist; (#R) rounds 4, 3, 2, 1; (RR) round-robin stage; (Q#) qualification round; (DNQ) did not qualify; (A) absent; (NH) not held; (SR) strike rate (events won / competed); (W–L) win–loss record.
To avoid confusion and double counting, these charts are updated at the conclusion of a tournament or when the player's participation has ended.

Tournament	2018	2019	2020	2021	2022	2023	2024	2025	2026	W–L	Win %
Grand Slam tournaments
Australian Open	A	Q1	1R	A	Q1	1R	2R	Q1	Q1	1–3	25%
French Open	Q2	Q3	3R	1R	Q1	1R	1R	2R	A	3–5	38%
Wimbledon	Q1	Q2	NH	2R	3R	4R	1R	Q1	A	5–4	56%
US Open	Q3	Q3	A	Q1	3R	1R	Q2	1R	A	2–3	40%
Win–loss	0–0	0–0	2–2	1–2	3–2	3–4	1–3	1–2	0–0	11–15	42%
National representation
Summer Olympics	Not Held			2R	Not Held		A	Not Held		1–1	50%
Davis Cup	A	RR	RR		A	WG1	A			3–3	50%
ATP 1000 tournaments
Indian Wells Open	A	A	NH	1R	Q2	1R	1R	A	A	0–3	0%
Miami Open	A	A	NH	3R	2R	1R	1R	A	A	3–4	43%
Monte-Carlo Masters	A	A	NH	A	A	A	A	A	A	0–0	–
Madrid Open	A	A	NH	A	A	1R	1R	Q2	A	0–2	0%
Italian Open	A	A	Q1	A	A	Q1	1R	Q1	A	0–1	0%
Canadian Open	A	A	NH	Q2	A	A	A	A	A	0–0	–
Cincinnati Open	A	A	A	A	A	Q2	A	2R	A	1–1	50%
Shanghai Masters	A	A	Not Held			1R	A	A	A	0–1	0%
Paris Masters	A	A	Q1	A	Q1	A	A	A	A	0–0	–
Win–loss	0–0	0–0	0–0	2–2	1–1	0–4	0–4	1–1	0–0	4–12	25%
Year-end ranking	221	191	115	111	67	93	127	153	343	$4,099,315	

== ATP Challenger Tour finals ==
=== Singles: 12 (6 titles, 6 runner-ups) ===
Legend ATP Challenger Tour (6–6)	Finals by surface Hard (0–1) Clay (6–5)

Result	W–L	Date	Tournament	Tier	Surface	Opponent	Score
Loss	0–1	Sep 2017	Bogotá, Colombia	Challenger	Clay	(El Salvador) Marcelo Arévalo	5–7, 4–6
Win	1–1	Jul 2018	San Benedetto del Tronto, Italy	Challenger	Clay	(Spain) Sergio Gutiérrez Ferrol	6–2, 3–6, 6–2
Loss	1–2	Feb 2020	Newport Beach, US	Challenger	Hard	(United States) Thai-Son Kwiatkowski	4–6, 1–6
Win	2–2	Nov 2020	Lima, Peru	Challenger	Clay	(Argentina) Thiago Agustín Tirante	6–1, 3–6, 6–3
Loss	2–3	May 2021	Heilbronn, Germany	Challenger	Clay	(Spain) Bernabé Zapata Miralles	3–6, 4–6
Win	3–3	Jan 2022	Concepción, Chile	Challenger	Clay	(Argentina) Santiago Rodríguez Taverna	6–1, 3–6, 6–3
Win	4–3	Apr 2022	Sarasota, US	Challenger	Clay (green)	(United States) Steve Johnson	7–6^{(9–7)}, 4–6, 6–1
Loss	4–4	Apr 2023	Sarasota, US	Challenger	Clay (green)	(Germany) Daniel Altmaier	6–7^{(1–7)}, 1–6
Loss	4–5	Nov 2023	Guayaquil, Ecuador	Challenger	Clay	(Chile) Alejandro Tabilo	2–6, 2–6
Loss	4–6	Sep 2024	Braga, Portugal	Challenger	Clay	(Denmark) Elmer Møller	4–6, 6–7^{(4–7)}
Win	5–6	Jan 2025	Punta del Este, Uruguay	Challenger	Clay	(Chile) Tomás Barrios Vera	5–7, 6–4, 6–4
Win	6–6	Mar 2025	Santiago, Chile	Challenger	Clay	(Brazil) Thiago Monteiro	7–5, 6–3

=== Doubles: 1 (1 runner-up) ===
Legend ATP Challenger Tour (0–1)

Result	W–L	Date	Tournament	Tier	Surface	Partner	Opponents	Score
Loss	0–1	Aug 2017	Santo Domingo, Dominican Republic	Challenger	Clay	(Colombia) Santiago Giraldo	(Argentina) Juan Ignacio Londero (Venezuela) Luis David Martínez	4–6, 4–6

== ITF Tour finals ==
=== Singles: 11 (4 titles, 7 runner-ups) ===
Legend ITF Futures (4–7)	Finals by surface Hard (2–3) Clay (2–4)

Result	W–L	Date	Tournament	Tier	Surface	Opponent	Score
Win	1–0	Jun 2015	Mexico F8, Manzanillo	Futures	Hard	(Colombia) Felipe Mantilla	6–3, 7–6^{(7–4)}
Loss	1–1	Jul 2015	Colombia F4, Popayán	Futures	Hard	(Colombia) Eduardo Struvay	6–3, 6–7^{(5–7)}, 6–7^{(2–7)},
Win	2–1	Oct 2015	Colombia F8, Bogotá	Futures	Clay	(Colombia) Cristian Rodríguez	6–3, 3–2 ret.
Loss	2–2	Oct 2016	Colombia F4, Valledupar	Futures	Hard	(Chile) Marcelo Tomás Barrios Vera	6–4, 3–6, 6–7^{(5–7)}
Loss	2–3	Oct 2016	Colombia F5, Manizales	Futures	Clay	(Colombia) Alejandro Gómez	6–7^{(4–7)}, 4–6
Loss	2–4	Oct 2016	Colombia F6, Neiva	Futures	Clay	(Colombia) Alejandro Gómez	5–7, 4–6
Loss	2–5	Nov 2016	Colombia F8, Medellín	Futures	Clay	(Colombia) Alejandro Gómez	7–5, 2–6, 6–7^{(3–7)}
Loss	2–6	Dec 2016	Colombia F9, Villavicencio	Futures	Clay	(Brazil) Nicolas Santos	4–6, 2–6
Win	3–6	Jul 2017	Colombia F1, Valledupar	Futures	Hard	(Guatemala) Christopher Díaz Figueroa	6–3, 7–5
Loss	3–7	Jul 2017	Colombia F2, Manizales	Futures	Hard	(Argentina) Facundo Argüello	4–6, 7–5, 2–6
Win	4–7	Dec 2017	Peru F1, Lima	Futures	Clay	(Peru) Nicolás Álvarez	7–5, 6–3

=== Doubles: 2 (2 titles) ===
Legend ITF Futures (2–0)

Result	W–L	Date	Tournament	Tier	Surface	Partner	Opponents	Score
Win	1–0	Aug 2017	Colombia F3, Pereira	Futures	Clay	(Dominican Republic) José Olivares	(Guatemala) Christopher Díaz Figueroa (Mexico) Luis Patiño	6–2, 6–3
Win	2–0	Dec 2017	Peru F1, Lima	Futures	Clay	(Brazil) João Pedro Sorgi	(Bolivia) Boris Arias (Bolivia) Federico Zeballos	4–6, 6–4, [10–3]

== Wins over top 10 players ==
- He has a 1–4 record against players who were, at the time the match was played, ranked in the top 10.

Season	2022	2023	2024	Total
Wins	1	0	0	1

#	Player	Rank	Event	Surface	Rd	Score	DEGR
2022
1.	(Greece) Stefanos Tsitsipas	5	US Open, United States	Hard	1R	6–0, 6–1, 3–6, 7–5	94

*As of 23 March 2024
