= Juan Martín Fumeaux =

Uruguayan tennis player (born 2002)

- Country (sports): Uruguay
- Residence: Buenos Aires, Argentina
- Born: 13 March 2002 (age 23) Paysandú, Uruguay
- Plays: Right-handed (two-handed backhand)
- Prize money: $530

Singles
- Career record: 0–0 (at ATP Tour level, Grand Slam level, and in Davis Cup)
- Career titles: 0

Doubles
- Career record: 0–1 (at ATP Tour level, Grand Slam level, and in Davis Cup)
- Career titles: 0
- Highest ranking: No. 1171 (11 November 2018)
- Current ranking: No. 1184 (6 January 2020)
- Last updated on: 6 January 2020.

Juan Martín Fumeaux (born 13 March 2002) is a Uruguayan tennis player.

Fumeaux has a career high ATP doubles ranking of 1171 achieved on 11 November 2019.

Fumeaux made his ATP main draw debut at the 2020 ATP Cup, losing a doubles match to Pablo Carreño Busta and Feliciano López.
