= Nicolás Xiviller =

Uruguayan tennis player

- Country (sports): Uruguay
- Born: 11 November 1998 (age 27)
- Plays: Right-handed (two-handed backhand)
- Prize money: $8,844

Singles
- Career record: 1–0 (at ATP Tour level, Grand Slam level, and in Davis Cup)
- Career titles: 0
- Highest ranking: No. 1,023 (14 May 2018)

Doubles
- Career record: 2–0 (at ATP Tour level, Grand Slam level, and in Davis Cup)
- Career titles: 0
- Highest ranking: No. 991 (7 August 2017)

Nicolás Xiviller (born 11 November 1998) is an Uruguayan tennis player.

Xiviller has a career high ATP singles ranking of No. 1,308 achieved on 19 June 2017 and a career high ATP doubles ranking of No. 991 achieved on 7 August 2017.

Xiviller represents Uruguay at the Davis Cup where he has a W/L record of 3–0.

In 2026, Xivillier was fined for smashing a racquet in a public store. His posting of nonsensical stories in social media gave rise to concerns around his mental and physical health.
