= Gianluca Mager =

Italian tennis player

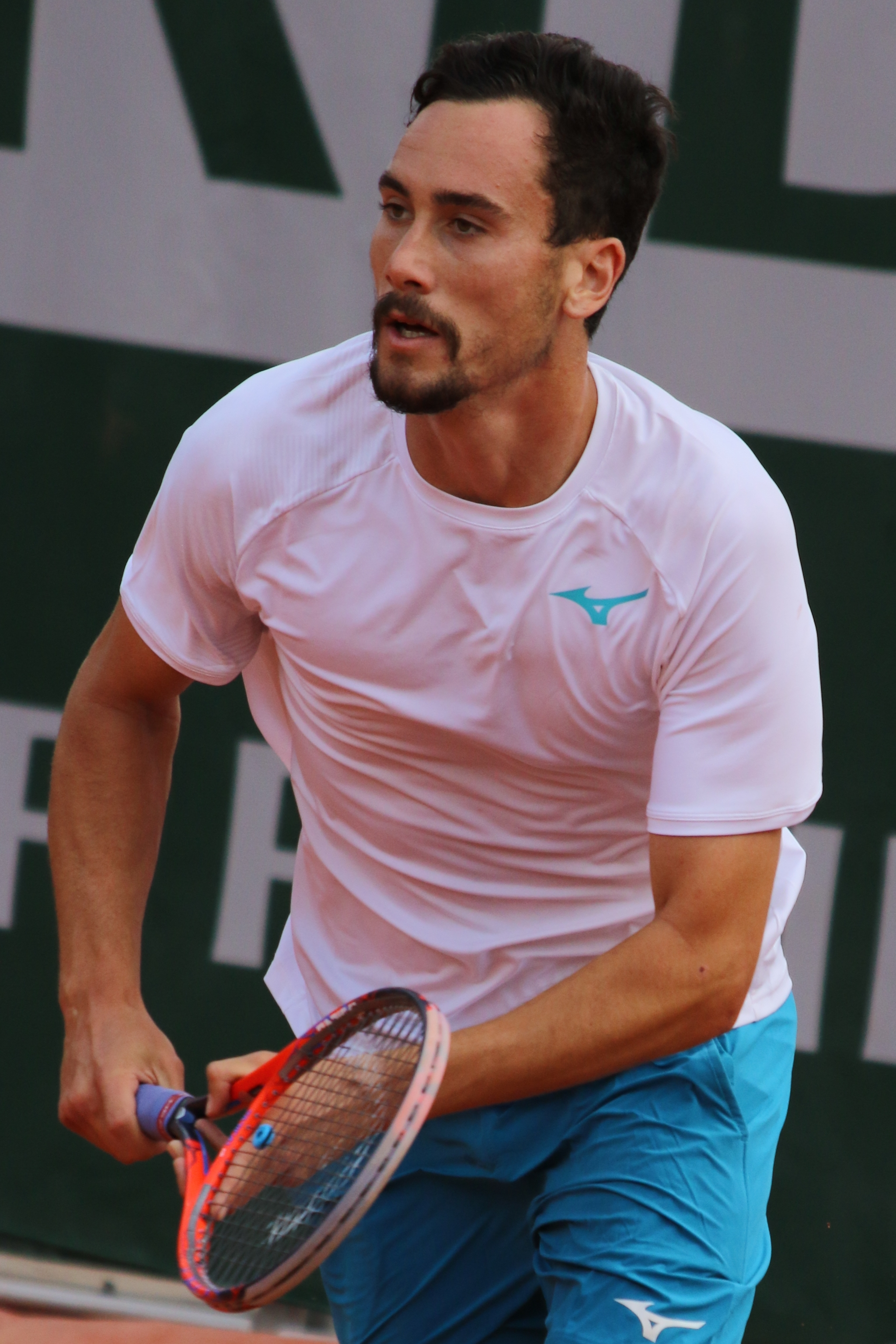
- Mager at the 2019 French Open
- Country (sports): Italy
- Born: 1 December 1994 (age 31) Sanremo, Liguria, Italy
- Height: 1.88 m (6 ft 2 in)
- Turned pro: 2013
- Retired: 2025
- Plays: Right-handed (two-handed backhand)
- Coach: Matteo Civarolo; Flavio Cipolla
- Prize money: US$1,596,525

Singles
- Career record: 25–35
- Career titles: 0
- Highest ranking: No. 62 (22 November 2021)

Grand Slam singles results
- Australian Open: 1R (2021, 2022)
- French Open: 2R (2021)
- Wimbledon: 2R (2021)
- US Open: 1R (2020, 2021)

Doubles
- Career record: 1–11
- Career titles: 0
- Highest ranking: No. 310 (10 June 2019)

Grand Slam doubles results
- Australian Open: 1R (2021, 2022)
- French Open: 1R (2020)
- Wimbledon: 1R (2021)
- US Open: 1R (2021)
- Last updated on: 29 January 2024.

Gianluca Mager (born 1 December 1994) is an Italian former professional tennis player. He has a career-high ATP singles ranking of No. 62 achieved on 22 November 2021. He also has a career high ATP doubles ranking of No. 310 achieved on 10 June 2019.

== Personal Info ==
Born in Liguria, from a family of German origins.

In 2010, Mager was disqualified for failing a doping test after smoking marijuana at a party.

== Professional career ==
Mager made his ATP main draw debut at the 2017 Internazionali BNL d'Italia after earning a wildcard in the pre-qualifying wildcard tournament. He was defeated by Aljaž Bedene in the first round.

He got his first singles ATP main-draw win in the first round in Stockholm in October 2019 against Spaniard Pablo Andújar.

At the 2020 Rio Open in Brazil, an ATP 500 level tournament on clay courts, he beat world No. 34 Casper Ruud in the first round, and world No. 4 Dominic Thiem in the quarterfinals to reach the semifinal as a qualifier. Mager reached his first ATP Tour final, defeating lucky loser Attila Balázs in the semifinals before losing to Chilean Cristian Garín, 6–7^{3–7}, 5–7. Mager started the tournament No. 114 in the world and qualified into the main draw. After this good performance, Mager reached a singles ranking of World No. 77.

At the 2021 Sofia Open Mager reached his fourth quarterfinal of the season at the ATP 250 level (after Delray Beach, Belgrade and Kitzbühel) defeating sixth seed Adrian Mannarino and Miomir Kecmanović. He lost in the quarterfinals to Gaël Monfils in straight sets 6–2, 6–2 in 50 minutes. He was aiming to reach his second tour-level semifinal and first since 2020 in Rio de Janeiro.

Mager announced his retirement from professional tennis in August 2025.

== ATP career finals ==
=== Singles: 1 (1 runner–up) ===
Legend Grand Slam (0–0) ATP Masters 1000 (0–0) ATP 500 (0–1) ATP 250 (0–0)	Titles by surface Hard (0–0) Clay (0–1) Grass (0–0)	Titles by setting Outdoor (0–1) Indoor (0–0)

Result	W–L	Date	Tournament	Tier	Surface	Opponent	Score
Loss	0–1	Feb 2020	Rio Open, Brazil	500 Series	Clay	(Chile) Cristian Garín	6–7^{(3–7)}, 5–7

== ATP Challenger and ITF Futures finals ==
=== Singles: 17 (10–7) ===
Legend (singles) ATP Challenger Tour (6–1) ITF Futures Tour (4–6)	Titles by surface Hard (1–0) Clay (9–7)

Result	W–L	Date	Tournament	Tier	Surface	Opponent	Score
Loss	0–1	Aug 2014	Georgia F2, Telavi	Futures	Clay	(Russia) Daniil Medvedev	6–3, 2–6, 2–6
Win	1–1	Aug 2014	Georgia F3, Telavi	Futures	Clay	(Chile) Cristóbal Saavedra Corvalán	2–4 ret.
Loss	1–2	Sep 2014	Italy F31, Santa Margherita di Pula	Futures	Clay	(Germany) Florian Fallert	1–6, 6–3, 3–6
Loss	1–3	Sep 2014	Italy F33, Santa Margherita di Pula	Futures	Clay	(Italy) Omar Giacalone	6–2, 2–6, 5–7
Loss	1–4	Nov 2014	Italy F39, Santa Margherita di Pula	Futures	Clay	(Italy) Gianluca Naso	4–6, 3–6
Loss	1–5	Aug 2015	Italy F20, Pontedera	Futures	Clay	(Italy) Lorenzo Giustino	6–7^{(3–7)}, 3–6
Win	2–5	Sep 2015	Italy F27, Santa Margherita di Pula	Futures	Clay	(Germany) Yannick Maden	7–6^{(8–6)}, 2–6, 6–3
Win	3–5	Oct 2015	Italy F33, Santa Margherita di Pula	Futures	Clay	(Italy) Lorenzo Sonego	6–3, 6–3
Win	4–5	Jul 2017	Italy F21, Casinalbo	Futures	Clay	(Argentina) Andrea Collarini	4–6, 7–6^{(7–0)}, 6–2
Loss	4–6	Apr 2018	Italy F7, Santa Margherita di Pula	Futures	Clay	(Italy) Lorenzo Giustino	4–6, 1–6
Loss	4–7	Jul 2018	Milan, Italy	Challenger	Clay	(Serbia) Laslo Đere	2–6, 1–6
Win	5–7	Jan 2019	Koblenz, Germany	Challenger	Hard (i)	(Spain) Roberto Ortega Olmedo	2–6, 7–6^{(8–6)}, 6–2
Win	6–7	Apr 2019	Barletta, Italy	Challenger	Clay	(Serbia) Nikola Milojević	7–6^{(9–7)}, 5–7, 3–2 ret.
Win	7–7	Sep 2019	Biella, Italy	Challenger	Clay	(Italy) Paolo Lorenzi	6-0, 6-7^{(4–7)}, 7-5
Win	8–7	Apr 2021	Marbella, Spain	Challenger	Clay	(Spain) Jaume Munar	2–6, 6–3, 6–2
Win	9–7	Feb 2022	Las Palmas, Spain	Challenger	Clay	(Spain) Roberto Carballés Baena	7–6^{(8–6)}, 6–2
Win	10–7	Jan 2024	Punta del Este, Uruguay	Challenger	Clay	(Argentina) Thiago Agustín Tirante	6–7^{(5–7)}, 6–2, 6–0

=== Doubles: 6 (2–4) ===
Legend (doubles) ATP Challenger Tour (1–0) ITF Futures Tour (1–4)	Titles by surface Hard (1–1) Clay (1–3)

Result	W–L	Date	Tournament	Tier	Surface	Partner	Opponents	Score
Loss	0–1	Aug 2014	Georgia F2, Telavi	Futures	Clay	(Italy) Riccardo Bonadio	(France) Grégoire Barrère (Switzerland) Luca Margaroli	6–7^{(5–7)}, 6–7^{(5–7)}
Win	1–1	Sep 2014	Italy F31, Santa Margherita di Pula	Futures	Clay	(Italy) Federico Maccari	(Spain) Marcos Giraldi Requena (Portugal) Gonçalo Oliveira	3–6, 6–4, [10–6]
Loss	1–2	Sep 2014	Italy F33, Santa Margherita di Pula	Futures	Clay	(Portugal) Gonçalo Oliveira	(Italy) Omar Giacalone (Italy) Pietro Rondoni	5–7, 1–6
Loss	1–3	Mar 2015	France F7, Saint Raphaël	Futures	Hard (i)	(Italy) Erik Crepaldi	(France) Yannick Jankovits (France) Alexandre Sidorenko	1–6, 4–6
Loss	1–4	Apr 2018	Italy F6, Santa Margherita di Pula	Futures	Clay	(Italy) Walter Trusendi	(Argentina) Juan Ignacio Galarza (Argentina) Mariano Kestelboim	6–1, 4–6, [6–10]
Win	2–4	Jan 2019	Chennai, India	Challenger	Hard	(Italy) Andrea Pellegrino	(Australia) Matt Reid (Australia) Luke Saville	6–4, 7–6^{(9–7)}

== Record against top 10 players ==
Mager's match record against those who have been ranked in the top 10, with those who are active in boldface. Only ATP Tour main draw matches and Davis Cup matches are considered:

Player	Record	Win %	Hard	Clay	Grass	Last match
Number 2 ranked players						
(Norway) **Casper Ruud**	1–1	50%	–	1–1	–	Lost (3–6, 2–6) at 2021 Marbella
Number 3 ranked players						
(Austria) **Dominic Thiem**	1–0	100%	–	1–0	–	Won (7–6^{(7–4)}, 7–5) at 2020 Rio de Janeiro
(Bulgaria) **Grigor Dimitrov**	0–1	0%	–	0–1	–	Lost (5–7, 1–6) at 2020 Rome
Number 4 ranked players						
(Italy) **Jannik Sinner**	0–1	0%	–	0–1	–	Lost (1–6, 5–7, 6–3, 3–6) at 2021 French Open
Number 5 ranked players						
(Russia) **Andrey Rublev**	0–1	0%	0–1	–	–	Lost (3–6, 2–6, 2–6) at 2022 Australian Open
Number 6 ranked players						
(Canada) **Félix Auger-Aliassime**	0–1	0%	0–1	–	–	Lost (6–4, 4–6, 1–6) at 2021 Paris
(France) **Gaël Monfils**	0–2	0%	0–2	–	–	Lost (4–6, 2–6) at 2021 Indian Wells
Number 8 ranked players						
(Russia) **Karen Khachanov**	0–1	0%	0–1	–	–	Lost (5–7, 3–6) at 2022 Adelaide 2
Number 10 ranked players						
(Spain) **Pablo Carreño Busta**	0–1	0%	0–1	–	–	Lost (3–6, 6–7^{(2–7)}) at 2019 Stockholm
**Total**	**2–9**	**18%**	**0–6 (0%)**	**2–3 (40%)**	**0–0 ( – )**	*** Statistics correct as of 18 October 2023.**

=== Wins over top 10 players ===
- He has a 1–1 record against players who were, at the time the match was played, ranked in the top 10

Season	2020	Total
Wins	1	**1**

#	Player	Rank	Event	Surface	Rd	Score	GMR
**2020**
1.	(Austria) Dominic Thiem	No. 4	Rio Open, Brazil	Clay	QF	7–6^{7–4}, 7–5	128

* As of 26 September 2020
