= Punta Open =

Punta del Este Open
- 2025 Punta Open

ATP Challenger Tour
- Event name: Punta del Este Open
- Location: Punta del Este, Uruguay
- Venue: Cantegril Country Club
- Category: ATP Challenger Tour
- Surface: Clay
- Draw: 32S/32Q/16D
- Prize money: $100,000

The Punta del Este Open is a professional tennis tournament played on clay courts. It is currently part of the ATP Challenger Tour. It has been held annually in Punta del Este, Uruguay from 1993 until 1999 (with the exception of 1998) and was reinstalled as Punta Open in 2018 until 2020. After a break of three years it came back in 2024.

== Past finals ==
=== Singles ===
Year	Champion	Runner-up	Score
2026	Not held		
2025	(Colombia) Daniel Elahi Galán	(Chile) Tomás Barrios Vera	5–7, 6–4, 6–4
2024	(Italy) Gianluca Mager	(Argentina) Thiago Agustín Tirante	6–7^{(5–7)}, 6–2, 6–0
2021–23	Not held		
2020	(Brazil) Thiago Monteiro	(Italy) Marco Cecchinato	7–6^{(7–3)}, 6–7^{(6–8)}, 7–5
2019	(Brazil) Thiago Monteiro	(Argentina) Facundo Argüello	3–6, 6–2, 6–3
2018	(Argentina) Guido Andreozzi	(Italy) Simone Bolelli	3–6, 6–4, 6–3
1999	(Argentina) Marcelo Charpentier	(Argentina) Martín Rodríguez	6–2, 6–2
1997	(Italy) Marco Meneschincheri	(Costa Rica) Juan Antonio Marín	6–7, 6–1, 6–4
1996	(Spain) Félix Mantilla	(Belgium) Kris Goossens	6–2, 7–6
1995	(Portugal) Emanuel Couto	(Argentina) Marcelo Charpentier	7–5, 7–6
1994	(Argentina) Franco Davín	(France) Gérard Solvès	6–2, 4–6, 6–0
1993	(Argentina) Javier Frana	(Argentina) Gabriel Markus	4–6, 6–2, 7–6

=== Doubles ===
Year	Champions	Runners-up	Score
2026	Not held		
2025	(Brazil) Gustavo Heide (Brazil) João Lucas Reis da Silva	(Argentina) Facundo Mena (Argentina) Marco Trungelliti	6–2, 6–3
2024	(Bolivia) Murkel Dellien (Argentina) Federico Agustín Gómez	(Argentina) Guido Andreozzi (Argentina) Guillermo Durán	6–3, 6–2
2021–23	Not held		
2020	(Brazil) Orlando Luz (Brazil) Rafael Matos	(Argentina) Juan Manuel Cerúndolo (Argentina) Thiago Agustín Tirante	6–4, 6–2
2019	(Argentina) Guido Andreozzi (Argentina) Guillermo Durán	(Belgium) Sander Gillé (Belgium) Joran Vliegen	6–2, 6–7^{(6–8)}, [10–8]
2018	(Argentina) Facundo Bagnis (Uruguay) Ariel Behar	(Italy) Simone Bolelli (Italy) Alessandro Giannessi	6–2, 7–6^{(9–7)}
1999	(Argentina) Lucas Arnold Ker (Uruguay) Marcelo Filippini	(Paraguay) Paulo Carvallo (Uruguay) Gonzalo Rodríguez	6–1, 6–4
1997	(Argentina) Daniel Orsanic (Argentina) Martín Rodríguez	(Brazil) Nelson Aerts (Brazil) Fernando Meligeni	6–2, 6–4
1996	(Brazil) Gustavo Kuerten (Brazil) Jaime Oncins	(Mexico) Alejandro Hernández (Germany) Simon Touzil	5–7, 6–4, 7–6
1995	(Argentina) Christian Miniussi (Uruguay) Diego Pérez	(Argentina) Lucas Arnold Ker (Argentina) Patricio Arnold	4–6, 7–5, 6–1
1994	(Uruguay) Marcelo Filippini (Uruguay) Diego Pérez	(Argentina) Luis Lobo (Argentina) Christian Miniussi	6–7, 7–6, 7–6
1993	(France) Jean-Philippe Fleurian (Netherlands) Mark Koevermans	(Brazil) William Kyriakos (Brazil) Fernando Meligeni	6–4, 6–1
