= Guido Andreozzi =

Argentine tennis player (born 1991)

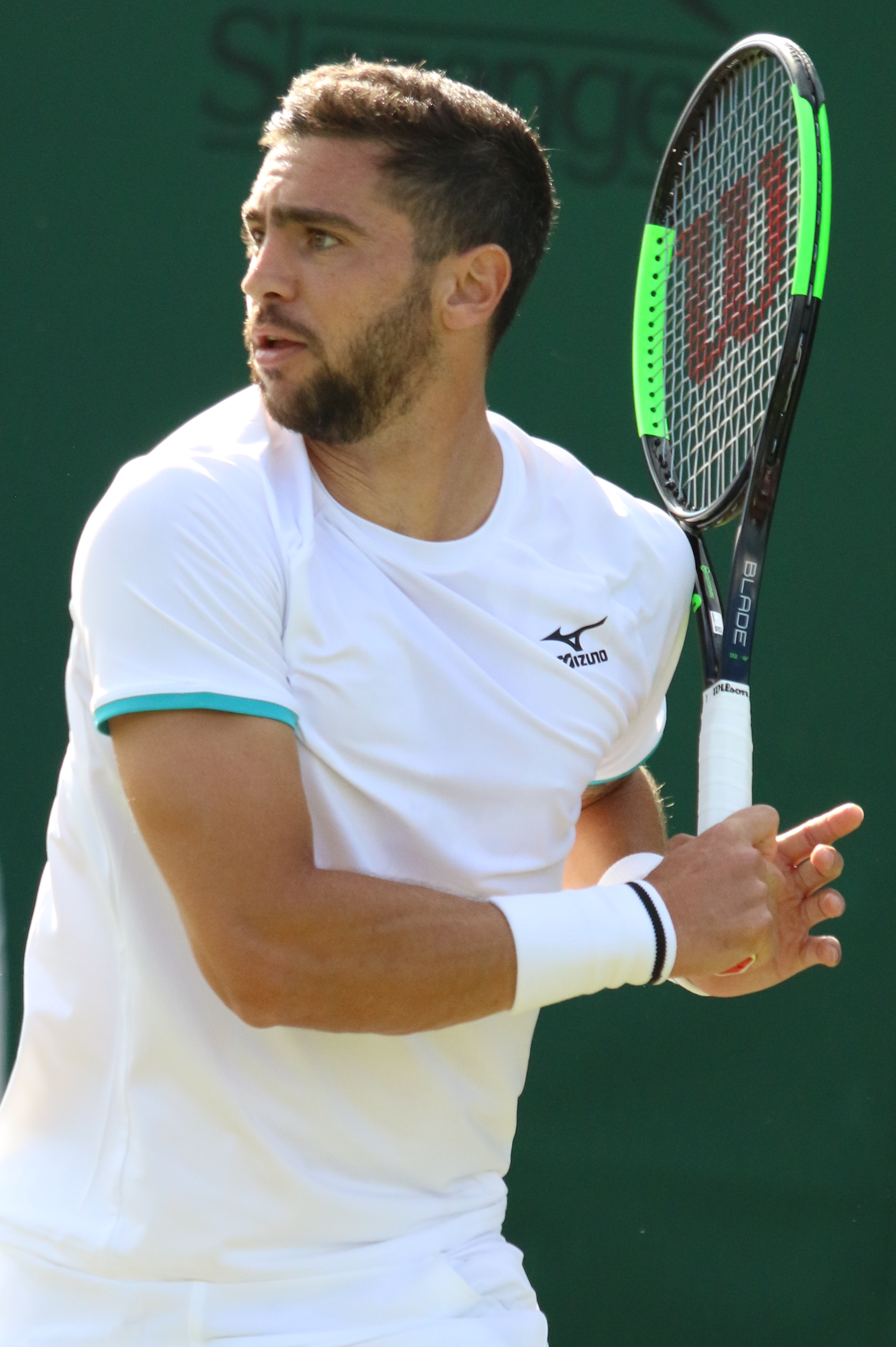
- Andreozzi at the 2019 Wimbledon
- Country (sports): Argentina
- Residence: Buenos Aires, Argentina
- Born: 5 August 1991 (age 35) Buenos Aires, Argentina
- Height: 1.83 m (6 ft 0 in)
- Turned pro: 2008
- Plays: Right-handed (two-handed backhand)
- Coach: Kevin Konfederak, Gastón Etlis
- Prize money: US $2,726,685

Singles
- Career record: 12–28
- Career titles: 0
- Highest ranking: No. 70 (28 January 2019)

Grand Slam singles results
- Australian Open: 1R (2019)
- French Open: 2R (2018)
- Wimbledon: 1R (2018, 2019)
- US Open: 1R (2012, 2016, 2018)

Doubles
- Career record: 83–67
- Career titles: 4
- Highest ranking: No. 14 (14 September 2026)
- Current ranking: No. 14 (14 September 2026)

Grand Slam doubles results
- Australian Open: 1R (2025, 2026)
- French Open: 2R (2024, 2025)
- Wimbledon: QF (2026)
- US Open: QF (2026)

Grand Slam mixed doubles results
- Wimbledon: QF (2026)
Medal record
Representing Argentina
Men's tennis
Pan American Games
Gold medal – first place	2015 Toronto	Mixed doubles
Silver medal – second place	2015 Toronto	Men's doubles
Silver medal – second place	2019 Lima	Men's doubles
Bronze medal – third place	2019 Lima	Men's singles
South American Games
Gold medal – first place	2014 Santiago	Men's doubles
Silver medal – second place	2014 Santiago	Men's singles
- Last updated on: 14 September 2026.

Guido Andreozzi (Latin American Spanish: [ˈɡiðo andɾeˈosi]; Italian: [ˈɡwiːdo andreˈɔttsi]; born 5 August 1991) is an Argentine professional tennis player who specializes in doubles. He has a career-high ATP doubles ranking of world No. 14 achieved on 14 September 2026 and a best singles ranking of No. 70 achieved on 28 January 2019.

Andreozzi has won four ATP Tour doubles titles, the most significant at the 2026 Indian Wells Masters, with Manuel Guinard. On the ATP Challenger Tour, he won 36 doubles and nine singles titles.

== Personal life ==
Andreozzi started taking tennis lessons at the age of six at Club Harrods, a facility near his home. His father, Jorge Andreozzi, is a construction worker and his mother, Nora Potente, is an accountant. He also has one brother named Franco. Guido attended school at Colegio Nicolas Avellaneda. He stated that his favourite surface is hardcourt, favorite shot is forehand and favorite tournament is the US Open. Idol growing up was Roger Federer. Hobbies include spending time with friends, listening to music, playing football and watching TV shows and movies. He is big fan of Boca Juniors football team. Currently trains at Club Liceo Naval. Fitness trainer is Mariano Gaute.

== Career ==
=== 2018-19: French Open singles win ===
As a junior, Andreozzi posted a 44-20 singles record and reached a career-high combined ranking of No. 146 in the world on 14 January 2008.

Following wins over Dustin Brown, Corentin Denolly and Mohamed Safwat, Andreozzi qualified for the main draw of the 2018 French Open. There, he defeated American Taylor Fritz in the first round. The Argentine was defeated in the second round by Fernando Verdasco.

=== 2023-25: Major doubles debut & first win, ATP title ===
At the 2023 Mexican Open in Acapulco, Andreozzi reached the main singles draw as a qualifier having been selected as an alternate for the qualifying competition.

He made his Grand Slam doubles debut at the 2023 French Open, partnering with compatriot Tomás Martín Etcheverry.

At the 2024 French Open, partnering Rinky Hijikata, he recorded his first doubles Grand Slam win.

Andreozzi qualified for the singles main draw at the 2024 Croatia Open Umag. In doubles, at the same tournament, he lifted his first ATP trophy with Mexican Miguel Ángel Reyes-Varela. The pair defeated French duo and second time ATP finalists Manuel Guinard and Grégoire Jacq in the final.

Andreozzi reached his first Masters 1000 semifinal at the 2025 Rolex Shanghai Masters with new partner Manuel Guinard, as an alternate pair, upsetting second seeds Harri Heliövaara and Henry Patten, but lost to German pair Kevin Krawietz and Tim Pütz.

=== 2026: Masters 1000 doubles title, top 20 ===
At the 2026 Indian Wells Open Andreozzi won his first title at the ATP Masters 1000 level, and biggest of his career, with partner Guinard, over top seeds Horacio Zeballos and Marcel Granollers in the semifinals, and Arthur Rinderknech and Valentin Vacherot in the final. It was also Andreozzi's fourth ATP Tour title.

== Performance timelines ==
Key
W	F	SF	QF	#R	RR	Q#	DNQ	A	NH

(W) winner; (F) finalist; (SF) semifinalist; (QF) quarterfinalist; (#R) rounds 4, 3, 2, 1; (RR) round-robin stage; (Q#) qualification round; (DNQ) did not qualify; (A) absent; (NH) not held; (SR) strike rate (events won / competed); (W–L) win–loss record.
To avoid confusion and double counting, these charts are updated at the conclusion of a tournament or when the player's participation has ended.

=== Singles ===
Current through the 2021 US Open.

Tournament	2012	2013	2014	2015	2016	2017	2018	2019	2020	2021	SR	W–L
Grand Slam tournaments
Australian Open	A	A	A	Q1	A	A	Q1	1R	A	Q1	0 / 1	0–1
French Open	A	Q1	Q2	Q1	Q3	Q3	2R	1R	A	Q1	0 / 2	1–2
Wimbledon	A	Q2	Q1	Q2	Q1	A	1R	1R	NH	Q1	0 / 2	0–2
US Open	1R	Q1	Q2	Q2	1R	Q3	1R	Q1	A	Q1	0 / 3	0–3
Win–loss	0–1	0–0	0–0	0–0	0–1	0–0	1–3	0–3	0–0	0–0	0 / 8	1–8

=== Doubles ===
Current through the 2026 Wimbledon Championships.

Tournament	2023	2024	2025	2026	SR	W–L	Win%
Grand Slam tournaments
Australian Open	A	A	1R	1R	0 / 2	0–2	0%
French Open	1R	2R	2R	1R	0 / 4	2–4	33%
Wimbledon	1R	1R	3R	QF	0 / 4	5–4	56%
US Open	A	2R	1R		0 / 2	1–2	40%
Win–loss	0–2	2–3	3–4	3–3	0 / 12	8–12	40%
ATP 1000 tournaments
Indian Wells Open	A	A	A	W	1 / 1	5–0	100%
Miami Open	A	A	2R	1R	0 / 2	1–2	33%
Monte-Carlo Masters	A	A	A	SF	0 / 1	3–1	75%
Madrid Open	A	A	A	F	0 / 1	4–1	80%
Italian Open	A	A	QF	A	0 / 1	2–1	67%
Canadian Open	A	A	QF		0 / 1	2–1	67%
Cincinnati Open	A	A	1R		0 / 1	0–1	0%
Shanghai Masters	A	A	SF		0 / 1	3–1	75%
Paris Masters	A	A	1R		0 / 1	0–1	0%
Win–loss	0–0	0–0	8–6	12–3	1 / 10	20–9	69%

== ATP Masters 1000 finals ==
=== Doubles: 2 (1 title, 1 runner-up) ===
Result	Year	Tournament	Surface	Partner	Opponents	Score
Win	2026	Indian Wells Open	Hard	(France) Manuel Guinard	(France) Arthur Rinderknech (Monaco) Valentin Vacherot	7–6^{(7–3)}, 6–3
Loss	2026	Madrid Open	Clay	(France) Manuel Guinard	(United Kingdom) Henry Patten (Finland) Harri Heliövaara	3–6, 6–3, [7–10]

== ATP Tour finals ==
=== Doubles: 7 (4 titles, 3 runner-ups) ===
Legend Grand Slam (–) ATP 1000 (1–1) ATP 500 (–) ATP 250 (3–2)	Finals by surface Hard (1–1) Clay (3–1) Grass (0–1)	Finals by setting Outdoor (4–2) Indoor (0–1)

Result	W–L	Date	Tournament	Tier	Surface	Partner	Opponents	Score
Win	1–0	Jul 2024	Croatia Open, Croatia	ATP 250	Clay	(Mexico) Miguel Ángel Reyes-Varela	(France) Manuel Guinard (France) Grégoire Jacq	6–4, 6–2
Win	2–0	Feb 2025	Argentina Open, Argentina	ATP 250	Clay	(France) Théo Arribagé	(Brazil) Rafael Matos (Brazil) Marcelo Melo	7–5, 4–6, [10–7]
Win	3–0	Jul 2025	Swedish Open, Sweden	ATP 250	Clay	(Netherlands) Sander Arends	(Czech Republic) Adam Pavlásek (Poland) Jan Zieliński	6–7^{(4–7)}, 7–5, [10–6]
Loss	3–1	Nov 2025	Moselle Open, France	ATP 250	Hard (i)	(France) Manuel Guinard	(France) Quentin Halys (France) Pierre-Hugues Herbert	5–7, 3–6
Win	4–1	Mar 2026	Indian Wells Open, United States	ATP 1000	Hard	(France) Manuel Guinard	(France) Arthur Rinderknech (Monaco) Valentin Vacherot	7–6^{(7–3)}, 6–3
Loss	4–2	May 2026	Madrid Open, Spain	ATP 1000	Clay	(France) Manuel Guinard	(Finland) Harri Heliövaara (United Kingdom) Henry Patten	3–6, 6–3, [7–10]
Loss	4–3	Jun 2026	Eastbourne International, United Kingdom	ATP 250	Grass	(France) Manuel Guinard	(Monaco) Hugo Nys (France) Édouard Roger-Vasselin	3–6, 6–4, [8–10]

== ATP Challenger and ITF Tour finals ==
=== Singles: 23 (15 titles, 8 runner–ups) ===
Legend ATP Challenger Tour (9–7) ITF Futures (6–1)	Finals by surface Hard (2–2) Clay (13–6)

Result	W–L	Date	Tournament	Tier	Surface	Opponent	Score
Win	1–0	Jul 2012	Lima Challenger, Peru	Challenger	Clay	(Argentina) Facundo Argüello	6–3, 6–7^{(6–8)}, 6–2
Loss	1–1	Jul 2013	Claro Open Medellín, Colombia	Challenger	Clay	(Colombia) Alejandro González	4–6, 4–6
Win	2–1	Oct 2013	Copa San Juan Gobierno, Argentina	Challenger	Clay	(Argentina) Diego Schwartzman	6–7^{(4–7)}, 7–6^{(7–5)} 6–0
Loss	2–2	Jul 2014	Manta Open, Ecuador	Challenger	Hard	(France) Adrian Mannarino	6–4, 3–6, 2–6
Win	3–2	Feb 2016	Milex Open, Dominican Republic	Challenger	Clay	(Argentina) Nicolás Kicker	6–0, 6–4
Win	4–2	May 2016	Vicenza International, Italy	Challenger	Clay	(Spain) Pere Riba	6–0, ret.
Loss	4–3	Oct 2016	Lima Challenger, Peru	Challenger	Clay	(Chile) Cristian Garín	6–3, 5–7, 6–7^{(3–7)}
Loss	4–4	Jul 2017	Poznań Open, Poland	Challenger	Clay	(Russia) Alexey Vatutin	6–2, 6–7^{(10–12)}, 3–6
Win	5–4	Mar 2018	Punta Open, Uruguay	Challenger	Clay	(Italy) Simone Bolelli	3–6, 6–4, 6–3
Loss	5–5	Mar 2018	Casino Admiral Trophy, Spain	Challenger	Clay	(Italy) Stefano Travaglia	3–6, 3–6
Win	6–5	Apr 2018	Tunis Open, Tunisia	Challenger	Clay	(Spain) Daniel Gimeno Traver	6–2, 3–0 ret.
Win	7–5	Sep 2018	Pekao Szczecin Open, Poland	Challenger	Clay	(Spain) Alejandro Davidovich Fokina	6–4, 4–6, 6–3
Win	8–5	Nov 2018	Guayaquil Challenger, Ecuador	Challenger	Clay	(Portugal) Pedro Sousa	7–5, 1–6, 6–4
Loss	8–6	Sep 2019	Pekao Szczecin Open, Poland	Challenger	Clay	(Slovakia) Jozef Kovalík	7–6^{(7–5)}, 2–6, 4–6
Loss	8–7	May 2021	Biella Challenger, Italy	Challenger	Clay	(Peru) Juan Pablo Varillas	3–6, 1–6
Win	9–7	Nov 2022	Challenger Temuco, Chile	Challenger	Hard	(Argentina) Nicolás Kicker	4–6, 6–4, 6–2
Win	1–0	Nov 2010	F2 Chosica, Peru	Futures	Clay	(Argentina) Juan-Pablo Amado	6–3, 6–4
Win	2–0	Jun 2011	F17 Curitiba, Brazil	Futures	Clay	(Brazil) Tiago Lopes	6–1, 4–6, 6–3
Loss	2–1	Jun 2011	F5 Coro, Venezuela	Futures	Hard	(Venezuela) Román Recarte	3–6, 6–1, 3–6
Win	3–1	Aug 2011	F4 Guayaquil, Ecuador	Futures	Hard	(Ecuador) Julio César Campozano	7–5, 7–6^{(7–5)}
Win	4–1	Feb 2012	F8 Itajaí, Brazil	Futures	Clay	(Brazil) Ricardo Hocevar	7–6^{(7–2)}, 6–3
Win	5–1	Jun 2012	F15 Resistencia, Argentina	Futures	Clay	(Argentina) Andrés Molteni	6–0, 6–1
Win	6–1	Jun 2013	F10 Cesena, Italy	Futures	Clay	(Italy) Andrea Arnaboldi	6–4, 6–4

=== Doubles: 60 (39–21) ===
Legend ATP Challenger Tour (36–18) ITF Futures (3–3)	Finals by surface Hard (5–2) Clay (34–19)

Result	W–L	Date	Tournament	Tier	Surface	Partner	Opponents	Score
Win	1–0	Sep 2011	BH Tennis Open, Brazil	Challenger	Clay	(Argentina) Eduardo Schwank	(Brazil) Ricardo Hocevar (Sweden) Christian Lindell	6–2, 6–4
Win	2–0	Oct 2011	Recife Open, Brazil	Challenger	Hard	(Uruguay) Marcel Felder	(Brazil) Rodrigo-Antonio Grilli (Brazil) André Miele	6–3, 6–3
Win	3–0	May 2012	Rio Quente Classic, Brazil	Challenger	Hard	(Uruguay) Marcel Felder	(Brazil) Thiago Alves (Brazil) Augusto Laranja	6–3, 6–3
Win	4–0	Sep 2013	Milo Open Cali, Colombia	Challenger	Clay	(Argentina) Eduardo Schwank	(Colombia) Carlos Salamanca (Brazil) João Souza	6–2, 6–4
Win	5–0	Sep 2013	Campeonato Internacional, Brazil	Challenger	Clay	(Argentina) Máximo González	(Brazil) Thiago Alves (Brazil) Thiago Monteiro	6–4, 6–4
Win	6–0	Aug 2014	Como Challenger, Italy	Challenger	Clay	(Argentina) Facundo Argüello	(Canada) Steven Diez (Spain) Enrique López Pérez	6–2, 6–2
Win	7–0	Sep 2014	Porto Alegre Challenger, Brazil	Challenger	Clay	(Argentina) Guillermo Durán	(Argentina) Facundo Bagnis (Argentina) Diego Schwartzman	6–3, 6–3
Win	8–0	Oct 2014	Milo Open Cali, Colombia	Challenger	Clay	(Argentina) Guillermo Durán	(Colombia) Alejandro González (Mexico) César Ramírez	6–3, 6–4
Loss	8–1	May 2015	São Paulo Challenger, Brazil	Challenger	Clay	(Peru) Sergio Galdós	(United States) Chase Buchanan (Slovenia) Blaž Rola	4–6, 4–6
Win	9–1	Jun 2015	Caltanissetta Challenger, Italy	Challenger	Clay	(Argentina) Guillermo Durán	(Chinese Taipei) Lee Hsin-han (Italy) Alessandro Motti	6–3, 6–2
Loss	9–2	Nov 2015	Buenos Aires Challenger, Argentina	Challenger	Clay	(Argentina) Lukas Arnold Ker	(Chile) Julio Peralta (Argentina) Horacio Zeballos	2–6, 5–7
Win	10–2	Jun 2016	Caltanissetta Challenger, Italy	Challenger	Clay	(Argentina) Andrés Molteni	(El Salvador) Marcelo Arévalo (Mexico) Miguel Ángel Reyes-Varela	6–1, 6–2
Loss	10–3	Mar 2017	Tigre Challenger, Argentina	Challenger	Hard	(Argentina) Guillermo Durán	(Argentina) Máximo González (Argentina) Andrés Molteni	1–6, 7–6^{(8–6)}, [5–10]
Win	11–3	Jul 2017	Poznań Open, Poland	Challenger	Clay	(Spain) Jaume Munar	(Poland) Tomasz Bednarek (Portugal) Gonçalo Oliveira	6–7^{(4–7)}, 6–3, [10–4]
Win	12–3	Jul 2017	Cortina International, Italy	Challenger	Clay	(Austria) Gerald Melzer	(Australia) Steven de Waard (Japan) Ben McLachlan	6–2, 7–6^{(7–4)}
Loss	12–4	Sep 2017	AON Open Challenger, Italy	Challenger	Clay	(Uruguay) Ariel Behar	(Germany) Tim Pütz (Germany) Jan-Lennard Struff	6–7^{(5–7)}, 6–7^{(8–10)}
Loss	12–5	Mar 2018	Cachantún Cup, Chile	Challenger	Clay	(Argentina) Guillermo Durán	(Monaco) Romain Arneodo (France) Jonathan Eysseric	6–7^{(4–7)}, 6–1, [10–12]
Win	13–5	Mar 2018	Casino Admiral Trophy, Spain	Challenger	Clay	(Uruguay) Ariel Behar	(Slovakia) Martin Kližan (Slovakia) Jozef Kovalík	6–3, 6–4
Loss	13–6	Apr 2018	JC Ferrero Challenger, Spain	Challenger	Clay	(Uruguay) Ariel Behar	(Netherlands) Wesley Koolhof (New Zealand) Artem Sitak	3–6, 2–6
Loss	13–7	May 2018	Open du Pays d'Aix, France	Challenger	Clay	(France) Kenny de Schepper	(Germany) Philipp Petzschner (Germany) Tim Pütz	7–6^{(7–3)}, 2–6, [8–10]
Loss	13–8	Sep 2018	Pekao Szczecin Open, Poland	Challenger	Clay	(Argentina) Guillermo Durán	(Poland) Karol Drzewiecki (Slovakia) Filip Polášek	3–6, 4–6
Win	14–8	Oct 2018	Lima Challenger, Peru	Challenger	Clay	(Argentina) Guillermo Durán	(Uruguay) Ariel Behar (Ecuador) Gonzalo Escobar	2–6, 7–6^{(7–5)}, [10–5]
Win	15–8	Nov 2018	Uruguay Open, Uruguay	Challenger	Clay	(Argentina) Guillermo Durán	(Argentina) Facundo Bagnis (Argentina) Andrés Molteni	7–6^{(7–5)}, 6–4
Win	16–8	Nov 2018	Buenos Aires Challenger, Argentina	Challenger	Clay	(Argentina) Guillermo Durán	(Brazil) Marcelo Demoliner (Argentina) Andrés Molteni	6–4, 4–6, [10–3]
Win	17–8	Jan 2019	Punta Open, Uruguay	Challenger	Clay	(Argentina) Guillermo Durán	(Belgium) Sander Gillé (Belgium) Joran Vliegen	6–2, 6–7^{(6–8)}, [10–8]
Loss	17–9	May 2019	Lisboa Belém Open, Portugal	Challenger	Clay	(Argentina) Guillermo Durán	(Austria) Philipp Oswald (Slovakia) Filip Polášek	5–7, 2–6
Loss	17–10	Sep 2019	AON Open Challenger, Italy	Challenger	Clay	(Argentina) Andrés Molteni	(Ecuador) Gonzalo Escobar (Uruguay) Ariel Behar	6–3, 4–6, [3–10]
Win	18–10	Sep 2019	Pekao Szczecin Open, Poland	Challenger	Clay	(Argentina) Andrés Molteni	(Chile) Hans Podlipnik Castillo (Netherlands) Matwé Middelkoop	6–4, 6–3
Win	19–10	Sep 2019	Buenos Aires Challenger, Argentina	Challenger	Clay	(Argentina) Andrés Molteni	(Bolivia) Hugo Dellien (Bolivia) Federico Zeballos	6–7^{(3–7)}, 6–2, [10–1]
Loss	19–11	May 2021	Garden Open II, Italy	Challenger	Clay	(Argentina) Guillermo Durán	(France) Sadio Doumbia (France) Fabien Reboul	5-7, 3–6
Win	20–11	Jul 2021	Porto Challenger, Portugal	Challenger	Hard	(Argentina) Guillermo Durán	(Argentina) Renzo Olivo (Mexico) Miguel Ángel Reyes-Varela	6–7^{(5–7)}, 7–6^{(7–5)}, [11–9]
Win	21–11	June 2022	Corrientes Challenger, Argentina	Challenger	Clay	(Argentina) Guillermo Durán	(Peru) Nicolás Álvarez (Bolivia) Murkel Dellien	7-5, 6–2
Win	22–11	Jul 2022	Todi International, Italy	Challenger	Clay	(Argentina) Guillermo Durán	(Monaco) Romain Arneodo (France) Jonathan Eysseric	6–1, 2–6, [10–6]
Win	23–11	Sep 2022	Buenos Aires Challenger, Argentina	Challenger	Clay	(Argentina) Guillermo Durán	(Argentina) Román Andrés Burruchaga (Argentina) Facundo Díaz Acosta	6–0, 7–5
Loss	23–12	Oct 2022	Campeonato International, Brazil	Challenger	Clay	(Argentina) Guillermo Durán	(Bolivia) Boris Arias (Bolivia) Federico Zeballos	5–7, 2–6
Win	24–12	Oct 2022	Rio de Janeiro Challenger, Brazil	Challenger	Clay	(Argentina) Guillermo Durán	(Poland) Karol Drzewiecki (Switzerland) Jakub Paul	6–3, 6–2
Loss	24–13	Oct 2022	Lima Challenger II, Peru	Challenger	Clay	(Argentina) Guillermo Durán	(Netherlands) Jesper de Jong (Netherlands) Max Houkes	6–7^{(6–8)}, 6–3, [10–12]
Win	25–13	Oct 2022	Guayaquil Challenger, Ecuador	Challenger	Clay	(Argentina) Guillermo Durán	(Argentina) Facundo Díaz Acosta (Venezuela) Luis David Martínez	6–0, 6–4
Win	26–13	Nov 2022	São Léo Open, Brazil	Challenger	Clay	(Argentina) Guillermo Durán	(Brazil) Felipe Meligeni Alves (Brazil) João Lucas Reis da Silva	5–1 ret.
Win	27–13	Nov 2022	Challenger Temuco, Chile	Challenger	Hard	(Argentina) Guillermo Durán	(Venezuela) Luis David Martínez (India) Jeevan Nedunchezhiyan	6–4, 6–2
Win	28–13	Jan 2023	Challenger de Tigre, Argentina	Challenger	Clay	(Uruguay) Ignacio Carou	(Argentina) Leonardo Aboian (Argentina) Ignacio Monzón	5–7, 6–4, [10–5]
Win	29–13	Jan 2023	Challenger Concepción, Chile	Challenger	Clay	(Argentina) Guillermo Durán	(Italy) Luciano Darderi (Ukraine) Oleg Prihodko	7–6^{(7–1)}, 6–7^{(3–7)}, [10–7]
Loss	29–14	Apr 2023	Sarasota Open, United States	Challenger	Clay	(Argentina) Guillermo Durán	(United Kingdom) Julian Cash (United Kingdom) Henry Patten	6–7^{(4–7)}, 4–6
Loss	29–15	Apr 2023	Ostra Group Open, Czech Republic	Challenger	Clay	(Argentina) Guillermo Durán	(United States) Robert Galloway (Mexico) Miguel Ángel Reyes-Varela	5–7, 6–7^{(5–7)}
Win	30–15	Jun 2023	Cali Open, Colombia	Challenger	Clay	(Colombia) Cristian Rodríguez	(Brazil) Orlando Luz (Ukraine) Oleg Prihodko	6–3, 6–4
Loss	30–16	Sep 2023	Columbus Challenger, United States	Challenger	Hard (i)	(Mexico) Hans Hach Verdugo	(United States) Robert Cash (Japan) James Trotter	4–6, 6–2, [7–10]
Win	31–16	Oct 2023	Campinas International, Brazil	Challenger	Clay	(Argentina) Guillermo Durán	(Ecuador) Diego Hidalgo (Colombia) Cristian Rodríguez	7–6^{(7–4)}, 6–3
Win	32–16	Oct 2023	Curitiba Challenger, Brazil	Challenger	Clay	(Uruguay) Ignacio Carou	(Ecuador) Diego Hidalgo (Colombia) Cristian Rodríguez	6–4, 6–4
Win	33–16	Nov 2023	Uruguay Open, Uruguay	Challenger	Clay	(Argentina) Guillermo Durán	(Bolivia) Boris Arias (Bolivia) Federico Zeballos	2–6, 7–6^{(7–2)}, [10–8]
Loss	33–17	Jan 2024	Punta Open, Uruguay	Challenger	Clay	(Argentina) Guillermo Durán	(Bolivia) Murkel Dellien (Argentina) Federico Agustin Gomez	3–6, 2–6
Win	34–17	Jan 2024	Brasil Tennis Challenger, Brazil	Challenger	Clay	(Argentina) Guillermo Durán	(Brazil) Daniel Dutra da Silva (Brazil) Pedro Sakamoto	6–2, 7–6^{(7–5)}
Win	35–17	Mar 2024	Tennis Napoli Cup, Italy	Challenger	Clay	(Mexico) Miguel Ángel Reyes-Varela	(France) Theo Arribage (Romania) Victor Vlad Cornea	6–4, 1–6, [10–7]
Loss	35–18	Apr 2024	Madrid Challenger, Spain	Challenger	Clay	(Mexico) Miguel Ángel Reyes-Varela	(Finland) Harri Heliövaara (United Kingdom) Henry Patten	5–7, 6–7^{(1–7)}
Win	36–18	Jun 2024	Perugia International, Italy	Challenger	Clay	(Mexico) Miguel Ángel Reyes-Varela	(India) Sriram Balaji (Germany) Andre Begemann	6–4, 7–5
Loss	0–1	Sep 2009	F14 Adrogué, Argentina	Futures	Clay	(Argentina) Kevin Konfederak	(Argentina) Andrés Molteni (Argentina) Gonzalo Tur	6–4, 2–6, [10–12]
Win	1–1	May 2011	F2 Asunción, Paraguay	Futures	Clay	(Argentina) Juan-Pablo Amado	(Argentina) Joaquín-Jesús Monteferrario (Chile) Cristóbal Saavedra Corvalán	6–3, 6–1
Loss	1–2	Jun 2011	F16 Marília, Brazil	Futures	Clay	(Uruguay) Martín Cuevas	(Brazil) Tiago Lopes (Brazil) André Miele	6–2, 4–6, [6–10]
Win	2–2	Aug 2011	F5 Guayaquil, Ecuador	Futures	Hard	(Uruguay) Ariel Behar	(Colombia) Alejandro González (Colombia) Felipe Mantilla	7–6^{(11–9)}, 4–6, [10–8]
Loss	2–3	Aug 2011	F2 Chosica, Peru	Futures	Clay	(Uruguay) Martín Cuevas	(Peru) Mauricio Echazú (Venezuela) Román Recarte	7–5, 4–6, [5–10]
Win	3–3	Jun 2013	F10 Cesena, Italy	Futures	Clay	(Argentina) Agustín Velotti	(Netherlands) Sander Groen (Sweden) Andreas Vinciguerra	6–4, 6–1
