= 2015 Campeonato Internacional de Tenis de Santos – Singles =

Singles
- 2015 Campeonato Internacional de Tenis de Santos

Final
- Champion: (Slovenia) Blaž Rola
- Runner-up: (Belgium) Germain Gigounon
- Score: 6–3, 3–6, 6–3

Events
| Singles | Doubles |
| ← 2014 · | Campeonato Internacional de Tenis de Santos | · 2016 → |

Máximo González was the defending champion, but he lost in the second round.

Blaž Rola won the title, defeating Germain Gigounon in the final, 6–3, 3–6, 6–3.

== Seeds ==
1. (Argentina) Máximo González (second round)
2. (Slovenia) Blaž Rola (champion)
3. (Brazil) André Ghem (quarterfinals)
4. (Argentina) Guido Pella (semifinals)
5. (United States) Chase Buchanan (first round)
6. (Brazil) Guilherme Clezar (first round, retired)
7. (Chile) Nicolás Jarry (first round)
8. (Argentina) Guido Andreozzi (first round)

== Draw ==
=== Key ===
- Q = Qualifier
- WC = Wild card
- LL = Lucky loser
- Alt = Alternate
- SE = Special exempt
- PR = Protected ranking
- ITF = ITF entry
- JE = Junior exempt
- w/o = Walkover
- r = Retired
- d = Defaulted
- SR = Special ranking

=== Finals ===
Semifinals
WC | (Brazil) Orlando Luz | 3 | 3
(Belgium) Germain Gigounon | 6 | 6
4 | (Argentina) Guido Pella | 3 | 6 | 1
2 | (Slovenia) Blaž Rola | 6 | 3 | 6

Final
(Belgium) Germain Gigounon | 3 | 6 | 3
2 | (Slovenia) Blaž Rola | 6 | 3 | 6

=== Top half ===
First round
1 | (Argentina) M González | 6 | 7^{8}
WC | (Brazil) R Dutra Silva | 3 | 6^{6}
Q | (Argentina) A Velotti | 6 | 6^{4} | 6
(Sweden) C Lindell | 4 | 7^{7} | 4
WC | (Brazil) M Zormann | 6 | 6
(Brazil) F de Paula | 2 | 4
WC | (Brazil) O Luz | 6 | 4 | 6
8 | (Argentina) G Andreozzi | 3 | 6 | 3
3 | (Brazil) A Ghem | 6 | 6
(France) G Mina | 4 | 2
Q | (Brazil) R Hocevar | 7 | 7^{7}
(Bolivia) H Dellien | 5 | 6^{5}
(Belgium) G Gigounon | 6 | 6
(Chile) C Garín | 2 | 3
Q | (Brazil) J Pereira | 6 | 6
5 | (United States) C Buchanan | 2 | 4

Second round
1 | (Argentina) M González | 7^{8} | 3 | 1
Q | (Argentina) A Velotti | 6^{6} | 6 | 6
WC | (Brazil) M Zormann | 4 | 2
WC | (Brazil) O Luz | 6 | 6
3 | (Brazil) A Ghem | 5 | 6 | 6
Q | (Brazil) R Hocevar | 7 | 2 | 2
(Belgium) G Gigounon | 3 | 6 | 6
Q | (Brazil) J Pereira | 6 | 4 | 1

Quarterfinals
Q | (Argentina) A Velottti | 0^{r}
WC | (Brazil) O Luz | 5
3 | (Brazil) A Ghem | 6 | 6^{4} | 2
(Belgium) G Gigounon | 4 | 7^{7} | 6

Semifinals
WC | (Brazil) O Luz | 3 | 3
(Belgium) G Gigounon | 6 | 6

=== Bottom half ===
First round
6 | (Chile) N Jarry | 7 | 2 | 4
(Dominican Republic) J Hernández | 5 | 6 | 6
(Argentina) A Molteni | 6 | 6
(Chile) JC Sáez | 0 | 2
(France) A Michon | 6 | 6^{7} | 7^{7}
(Belgium) J Cagnina | 6^{4} | 7^{9} | 6^{5}
(Chile) G Lama | 0 | 3
4 | (Argentina) G Pella | 6 | 6
6 | (Brazil) G Clezar | 7^{7} | 6^{3} | ^{r}
Q | (Brazil) P Sakamoto | 6^{1} | 7^{7}
(Argentina) N Kicker | 6 | 6
(France) Jules Marie | 1 | 3
WC | (Brazil) T Monteiro | 5 | 3
(France) A Musialek | 7 | 6
LL | (Argentina) F Coria | 3 | 2
2 | (Slovenia) B Rola | 6 | 6

Second round
(Dominican Republic) J Hernández | 5 | 4
(Argentina) A Molteni | 7 | 6
(France) A Michon | 6 | 1 | 6^{3}
4 | (Argentina) G Pella | 4 | 6 | 7^{7}
Q | (Brazil) P Sakamoto | 6 | 6
(Argentina) N Kicker | 3 | 3
(France) A Musialek | 3 | 2
2 | (Slovenia) B Rola | 6 | 6

Quarterfinals
(Argentina) A Molteni | 6 | 4 | 4
4 | (Argentina) G Pella | 3 | 6 | 6
Q | (Brazil) P Sakamoto | 0 | 3
2 | (Slovenia) B Rola | 6 | 6

Semifinals
4 | (Argentina) G Pella | 3 | 6 | 1
2 | (Slovenia) B Rola | 6 | 3 | 6
