= 2012 Campeonato Internacional de Tenis de Santos – Singles =

Singles
- 2012 Campeonato Internacional de Tenis de Santos

Final
- Champion: (Czech Republic) Ivo Minář
- Runner-up: (Brazil) Ricardo Hocevar
- Score: 4–6, 6–1, 6–4

Events
Singles	Doubles
← 2011 ·	Campeonato Internacional de Tenis de Santos	· 2013 →

João Souza is the defending champion, but lost in the first round to Facundo Argüello.
Ivo Minář won the title by defeating Ricardo Hocevar 4–6, 6–1, 6–4 in the final.

== Seeds ==
1. (Brazil) João Souza (first round)
2. (Slovenia) Blaž Kavčič (first round)
3. (Chile) Paul Capdeville (first round)
4. (Argentina) Diego Junqueira (quarterfinals)
5. (Brazil) Rogério Dutra da Silva (quarterfinals)
6. (Brazil) Ricardo Mello (first round)
7. (Brazil) Thiago Alves (first round)
8. (Argentina) Máximo González (quarterfinals)

== Draw ==
=== Key ===
- Q = Qualifier
- WC = Wild card
- LL = Lucky loser
- Alt = Alternate
- SE = Special exempt
- PR = Protected ranking
- ITF = ITF entry
- JE = Junior exempt
- w/o = Walkover
- r = Retired
- d = Defaulted
- SR = Special ranking

=== Finals ===
Semifinals
Q	(Brazil) Ricardo Hocevar	6	5	6
(Argentina) Martín Alund	4	7	1
(Czech Republic) Ivo Minář	6	7
Q	(Argentina) Marco Trungelliti	2	5

Final
Q	(Brazil) Ricardo Hocevar	6	1	4
(Czech Republic) Ivo Minář	4	6	6

=== Top half ===
First round
1/WC	(Brazil) J Souza	6^{8}	1
(Argentina) F Argüello	7^{10}	6
(Australia) M Reid	3	5
Q	(Brazil) R Hocevar	6	7
(Portugal) G Elias	4	7	6
(Brazil) G Clezar	6	5	2
(Brazil) J Silva	2	6	6
6	(Brazil) R Mello	6	3	4
4	(Argentina) D Junqueira	6^{3}	7^{7}	6
(Argentina) P Galdón	7^{7}	6^{3}	1
WC	(Brazil) Felipe Soares	6	6^{8}	1
SE	(Argentina) A Velotti	1	7^{10}	6
(Italy) D Giorgini	6^{4}	6	3
(Argentina) M Alund	7^{7}	3	6
(Argentina) G Pella	6	7
7	(Brazil) T Alves	4	5

Second round
(Argentina) F Argüello	2	3
Q	(Brazil) R Hocevar	6	6
(Portugal) G Elias	6^{5}	4
(Brazil) J Silva	7^{7}	6
4	(Argentina) D Junqueira	6^{4}	6	7
SE	(Argentina) A Velotti	7^{7}	2	5
(Argentina) M Alund	6	7
(Argentina) G Pella	3	5

Quarterfinals
Q	(Brazil) R Hocevar	2	6	6
(Brazil) J Silva	6	3	4
4	(Argentina) D Junqueira	7	1	6^{5}
(Argentina) M Alund	5	6	7^{7}

Semifinals
Q	(Brazil) R Hocevar	6	5	6
(Argentina) M Alund	4	7	1

=== Bottom half ===
First round
8	(Argentina) M González	3	6	7
SE	(Italy) A Brizzi	6	3	5
(Serbia) N Ćirić	6^{6}	6	6^{7}
WC	(Brazil) JP Sorgi	7^{8}	2	7^{9}
(Czech Republic) I Minář	6	7
(Italy) M Crugnola	3	5
(Uruguay) M Felder	7	6^{1}	6
3	(Chile) P Capdeville	5	7^{7}	3
5	(Brazil) R Dutra da Silva	6	6
WC	(Brazil) Enrique Bogo	0	0
(Italy) Enrico Burzi	4	5
Q	(Argentina) G Andreozzi	6	7
Q	(Argentina) M Trungelliti	7	4	6
(Australia) J Duckworth	5	6	4
Q	(Bosnia and Herzegovina) D Džumhur	6	4	6
2	(Slovenia) B Kavčič	4	6	4

Second round
8	(Argentina) M González	4	6	6
WC	(Brazil) JP Sorgi	6	3	3
(Czech Republic) I Minář	6	6
(Uruguay) M Felder	3	3
5	(Brazil) R Dutra da Silva	6	6
Q	(Argentina) G Andreozzi	3	1
Q	(Argentina) M Trungelliti	0	6	6
Q	(Bosnia and Herzegovina) D Džumhur	6	1	1

Quarterfinals
8	(Argentina) M González	2	3
(Czech Republic) I Minář	6	6
5	(Brazil) R Dutra da Silva	2	7^{5}	3
Q	(Argentina) M Trungelliti	6	6^{5}	6

Semifinals
(Czech Republic) I Minář	6	7
Q	(Argentina) M Trungelliti	2	5
