= 2013 Campeonato Internacional de Tenis de Santos – Doubles =

Doubles
- 2013 Campeonato Internacional de Tenis de Santos

Final
- Champions: (Slovakia) Pavol Červenák (Italy) Matteo Viola
- Runners-up: (Brazil) Guilherme Clezar (Portugal) Gastão Elias
- Score: 6–2, 4–6, [10–6]

Events
Singles	Doubles
← 2012 ·	Campeonato Internacional de Tenis de Santos	· 2014 →

Andrés Molteni and Marco Trungelliti were the defending champions but decided not to participate.
Pavol Červenák and Matteo Viola defeated Guilherme Clezar and Gastão Elias 6–2, 4–6, [10–6] in the final to win the title.

== Seeds ==
1. (Croatia) Nikola Mektić / (Croatia) Antonio Veić (semifinals)
2. (Argentina) Guido Andreozzi / (Uruguay) Ariel Behar (first round)
3. (Brazil) Guilherme Clezar / (Portugal) Gastão Elias (final)
4. (Serbia) Boris Pašanski / (Bosnia and Herzegovina) Aldin Šetkić (first round)

== Draw ==
=== Key ===
- Q = Qualifier
- WC = Wild card
- LL = Lucky loser
- Alt = Alternate
- SE = Special exempt
- PR = Protected ranking
- ITF = ITF entry
- JE = Junior exempt
- w/o = Walkover
- r = Retired
- d = Defaulted
- SR = Special ranking

=== Draw ===
First round
1	(Croatia) N Mektić (Croatia) A Veić	6	6
(Brazil) A Ghem (United States) D Kosakowski	3	2
WC	(Brazil) Allan Gomes Oliveira (Brazil) Caio Silva	4	1
(Australia) J Duckworth (France) P-H Herbert	6	6
3	(Brazil) G Clezar (Portugal) G Elias	6	6
WC	(Brazil) Wilson Leite (Brazil) J Souza	3	4
WC	(Brazil) R Dutra da Silva (Brazil) E Russi	6	6
(Brazil) R Hocevar (Brazil) L Kirche	3	3
(Canada) S Diez (Russia) Alexander Lobkov	1	2
(Slovakia) P Červenák (Italy) M Viola	6	6
(Chile) P Capdeville (Chile) H Podlipnik-Castillo	6	4	[10]
4	(Serbia) B Pašanski (Bosnia and Herzegovina) A Šetkić	3	6	[2]
(Argentina) G Durán (Argentina) A Velotti	6	6
(Spain) Marc Giner (Portugal) R Machado	3	4
(Tunisia) M Jaziri (Czech Republic) D Lojda	7	3	[10]
2	(Argentina) G Andreozzi (Uruguay) A Behar	5	6	[7]

Quarterfinals
1	(Croatia) N Mektić (Croatia) A Veić	4	7^{12}	[10]
(Australia) J Duckworth (France) P-H Herbert	6	6^{10}	[6]
3	(Brazil) G Clezar (Portugal) G Elias	6	6
WC	(Brazil) R Dutra da Silva (Brazil) E Russi	1	4
(Slovakia) P Červenák (Italy) M Viola	7	4	[10]
(Chile) P Capdeville (Chile) H Podlipnik-Castillo	5	6	[6]
(Argentina) G Durán (Argentina) A Velotti	4	5
(Tunisia) M Jaziri (Czech Republic) D Lojda	6	7

Semifinals
1	(Croatia) N Mektić (Croatia) A Veić	5	7	[10]
3	(Brazil) G Clezar (Portugal) G Elias	7	5	[12]
(Slovakia) P Červenák (Italy) M Viola	6	6
(Tunisia) M Jaziri (Czech Republic) D Lojda	2	3

Final
3	(Brazil) G Clezar (Portugal) G Elias	2	6	[6]
(Slovakia) P Červenák (Italy) M Viola	6	4	[10]
