= 2015 Campeonato Internacional de Tenis de Santos – Doubles =

Doubles
- 2015 Campeonato Internacional de Tenis de Santos

Final
- Champions: (Argentina) Máximo González (Venezuela) Roberto Maytín
- Runners-up: (Argentina) Andrés Molteni (Argentina) Guido Pella
- Score: 6–4, 7–6^{(7–4)}

Events
Singles	Doubles
← 2014 ·	Campeonato Internacional de Tenis de Santos	· 2016 →

Máximo González and Andrés Molteni were the defending champions, but decided not to compete together. González competed alongside Roberto Maytín, while Molteni played alongside Guido Pella.

González and Maytín won the title, defeating Molteni and Pella in the final, 6–4, 7–6^{(7–4)}.

== Seeds ==
1. (Argentina) Máximo González / (Venezuela) Roberto Maytín (champions)
2. (Argentina) Andrés Molteni / (Argentina) Guido Pella (final)
3. (Argentina) Guido Andreozzi / (Uruguay) Ariel Behar (semifinals)
4. (Republic of Ireland) James Cluskey / (Republic of Ireland) David O'Hare (semifinals)

== Draw ==
=== Key ===
- Q = Qualifier
- WC = Wild card
- LL = Lucky loser
- Alt = Alternate
- SE = Special exempt
- PR = Protected ranking
- ITF = ITF entry
- JE = Junior exempt
- w/o = Walkover
- r = Retired
- d = Defaulted
- SR = Special ranking

First round
1	(Argentina) M González (Venezuela) R Maytín	7	6
(Argentina) M Alund (Bolivia) H Dellien	5	1
(Peru) S Galdós (Brazil) F Romboli	4	0
(Brazil) R Dutra Silva (Brazil) A Ghem	6	6
3	(Argentina) G Andreozzi (Uruguay) A Behar	6	6
(France) Jules Marie (France) A Musialek	3	1
WC	(Brazil) R Matos (Brazil) M Zormann	6	6
WC	(Brazil) Allan Gomes Oliveira (Brazil) Gabriel Tumasonis	0	0
(Brazil) G Clezar (Brazil) F Neis	6^{2}	4
(France) A Michon (France) G Mina	7^{7}	6
WC	(Brazil) Luís Eduardo Santos (Brazil) Mario Santos	1	2
4	(Republic of Ireland) J Cluskey (Republic of Ireland) D O'Hare	6	6
(Dominican Republic) J Hernández (Sweden) C Lindell	6	4	[12]
(United States) C Buchanan (Slovenia) B Rola	3	6	[14]
(Chile) N Jarry (Chile) G Lama	2	1
2	(Argentina) A Molteni (Argentina) G Pella	6	6

Quarterfinals
1	(Argentina) M González (Venezuela) R Maytín	4	6	[10]
(Brazil) R Dutra Silva (Brazil) A Ghem	6	3	[7]
3	(Argentina) G Andreozzi (Uruguay) A Behar	6	7
WC	(Brazil) R Matos (Brazil) M Zormann	3	6
(France) A Michon (France) G Mina	4	6	[5]
4	(Republic of Ireland) J Cluskey (Republic of Ireland) D O'Hare	6	2	[10]
(United States) C Buchanan (Slovenia) B Rola	6^{4}	4
2	(Argentina) A Molteni (Argentina) G Pella	7^{7}	6

Semifinals
1	(Argentina) M González (Venezuela) R Maytín	6	6
3	(Argentina) G Andreozzi (Uruguay) A Behar	1	3
4	(Republic of Ireland) J Cluskey (Republic of Ireland) D O'Hare	4	6	[7]
2	(Argentina) A Molteni (Argentina) G Pella	6	1	[10]

Final
1	(Argentina) M González (Venezuela) R Maytín	6	7^{7}
2	(Argentina) A Molteni (Argentina) G Pella	4	6^{4}
