= 2014 Campeonato Internacional de Tenis de Santos – Singles =

Singles
- 2014 Campeonato Internacional de Tenis de Santos

Final
- Champions: (Argentina) Máximo González
- Runners-up: (Portugal) Gastão Elias
- Score: 7–5, 6–3

Events
Singles	Doubles
← 2013 ·	Campeonato Internacional de Tenis de Santos	· 2015 →

Gastão Elias was the defending champion, but lost in the final to Máximo González, 7–5, 6–3.

== Seeds ==
1. (United States) Denis Kudla (quarterfinals)
2. (Slovenia) Blaž Rola (withdrew due to left shoulder injury)
3. (Argentina) Diego Schwartzman (semifinals)
4. (Argentina) Guido Pella (quarterfinals)
5. (Brazil) João Souza (first round)
6. (United States) Wayne Odesnik (quarterfinals, retired)
7. (Netherlands) Thiemo de Bakker (quarterfinals)
8. (Argentina) Máximo González (champion)

== Draw ==
=== Key ===
- Q = Qualifier
- WC = Wild card
- LL = Lucky loser
- Alt = Alternate
- SE = Special exempt
- PR = Protected ranking
- ITF = ITF entry
- JE = Junior exempt
- w/o = Walkover
- r = Retired
- d = Defaulted
- SR = Special ranking

=== Finals ===
Semifinals
(France) Axel Michon	4	6^{8}
8	(Argentina) Máximo González	6	7^{10}
3	(Argentina) Diego Schwartzman	2	6	6^{4}
(Portugal) Gastão Elias	6	2	7^{7}

Final
8	(Argentina) Máximo González	7	6
(Portugal) Gastão Elias	5	3

=== Top half ===
First round
1	(United States) D Kudla	6	6
(Egypt) M Safwat	4	0
(Argentina) R Olivo	6	6
(Portugal) R Machado	2	3
(Australia) J Duckworth	4	6	4
(Belgium) K Coppejans	6	3	6
(France) A Michon	7	6
5	(Brazil) J Souza	5	1
4	(Argentina) G Pella	6	2	6
(Argentina) M Alund	4	6	4
(Brazil) A Ghem	7^{9}	6
WC	(Brazil) J Pereira	6^{7}	2
Q	(France) M Bourgue	6^{2}	6	6
(Brazil) RD da Silva	7^{7}	4	4
PR	(Ecuador) G Lapentti	3	6^{2}
8	(Argentina) M González	6	7^{7}

Second round
1	(United States) D Kudla	6	2	6
(Argentina) R Olivo	2	6	3
(Belgium) K Coppejans	1	5
(France) A Michon	6	7
4	(Argentina) G Pella	6	7
(Brazil) A Ghem	2	5
Q	(France) M Bourgue	4	4
8	(Argentina) M González	6	6

Quarterfinals
1	(United States) D Kudla	6^{4}	6	4
(France) A Michon	7^{7}	2	6
4	(Argentina) G Pella	5	6^{3}
8	(Argentina) M González	7	7^{7}

Semifinals
(France) A Michon	4	6^{8}
8	(Argentina) M González	6	7^{10}

=== Bottom half ===
First round
7	(Netherlands) T de Bakker	6	6
WC	(Brazil) F Saretta	2	2
SE	(Republic of Ireland) L Sorensen	6	6
WC	(Brazil) Wilson Leite	2	2
(France) L Pouille	1	3
(Argentina) JI Londero	6	6
(Argentina) A Molteni	4	2
3	(Argentina) D Schwartzman	6	6
6	(United States) W Odesnik	6	6
Q	(Italy) A Brizzi	2	4
LL	(Sweden) M Eriksson	7	3	6
(Venezuela) D Souto	5	6	4
Q	(Ecuador) E Gómez	2	7^{14}	6
WC	(Brazil) T Monteiro	6	6^{12}	4
(Portugal) G Elias	6	6
Q	(Slovenia) J Semrajc	3	4

Second round
7	(Netherlands) T de Bakker	7^{10}	4	6
SE	(Republic of Ireland) L Sorensen	6^{8}	6	1
(Argentina) JI Londero	1	3
3	(Argentina) D Schwartzman	6	6
6	(United States) W Odesnik	6	2	6
LL	(Sweden) M Eriksson	2	6	1
Q	(Ecuador) E Gómez	6^{2}	6	4
(Portugal) G Elias	7^{7}	4	6

Quarterfinals
7	(Netherlands) T de Bakker	3	1
3	(Argentina) D Schwartzman	6	6
6	(United States) W Odesnik	0	0^{r}
(Portugal) G Elias	6	3

Semifinals
3	(Argentina) D Schwartzman	2	6	6^{4}
(Portugal) G Elias	6	2	7^{7}
