= 2014 Campeonato Internacional de Tenis de Santos =

- Date: 21 – 27 April
- Edition: 4th
- Draw: 32S / 16D
- Prize money: $35,000+H
- Surface: Clay
- Location: Santos, Brazil

Champions

Singles
- (Argentina) Máximo González

Doubles
- (Argentina) Máximo González / (Argentina) Andrés Molteni
← 2013 ·	Campeonato Internacional de Tenis de Santos	· 2015 →

The 2014 Campeonato Internacional de Tenis de Santos was a professional tennis tournament played on clay courts. It was the fourth edition of the tournament which was part of the 2014 ATP Challenger Tour. It took place in Santos, Brazil between 21 and 27 April 2014.

== Singles main-draw entrants ==
=== Seeds ===
Country	Player	Rank	Seed
USA	Denis Kudla	109	1
SVN	Blaž Rola	121	2
ARG	Diego Sebastián Schwartzman	122	3
ARG	Guido Pella	125	4
POR	João Sousa	133	5
USA	Wayne Odesnik	148	6
NED	Thiemo de Bakker	151	7
ARG	Máximo González	156	8

=== Other entrants ===
The following players received wildcards into the singles main draw:

- (Brazil) José Pereira
- (Brazil) Flávio Saretta
- (Brazil) Wilson Leite
- (Brazil) Thiago Monteiro

The following players received entry from the qualifying draw:

- (France) Mathias Bourgue
- (Italy) Alberto Brizzi
- (Ecuador) Emilio Gómez
- (Slovenia) Janez Semrajc

== Doubles main-draw entrants ==
=== Seeds ===
Country	Player	Country	Player	Rank	Seed
BRA	Andre Sá	BRA	João Souza	227	1
ARG	Máximo González	ARG	Andrés Molteni	267	2
NED	Thiemo de Bakker	BRA	Marcelo Demoliner	327	3
ARG	Guillermo Duran	ARG	Renzo Olivo	348	4

=== Other entrants ===
The following pairs received wildcards into the doubles main draw:

- (Brazil) André Ghem / (Brazil) Flávio Saretta
- (Brazil) Leonardo Couto / (Brazil) Mario Santos Neto
- (Brazil) José Pereira / (Brazil) Alexandre Tsuchiya

== Champions ==
=== Singles ===
- (Argentina) Máximo González def. (Portugal) Gastão Elias, 7–5, 6–3

=== Doubles ===
- (Argentina) Máximo González / (Argentina) Andrés Molteni def. (Argentina) Guillermo Duran / (Argentina) Renzo Olivo, 7–5, 6–4
