= 2014 Campeonato Internacional de Tenis de Santos – Doubles =

Doubles
- 2014 Campeonato Internacional de Tenis de Santos

Final
- Champions: (Argentina) Máximo González (Argentina) Andrés Molteni
- Runners-up: (Argentina) Guillermo Durán (Argentina) Renzo Olivo
- Score: 7–5, 6–4

Events
Singles	Doubles
← 2013 ·	Campeonato Internacional de Tenis de Santos	· 2015 →

Pavol Červenák and Matteo Viola were the defending champions, but decided not to compete.

Máximo González and Andrés Molteni won the title, defeating Guillermo Durán and Renzo Olivo in the final, 7–5, 6–4.

== Seeds ==
1. (Brazil) Andre Sá / (Brazil) João Souza (semifinals)
2. (Argentina) Máximo González / (Argentina) Andrés Molteni (champions)
3. (Netherlands) Thiemo de Bakker / (Brazil) Marcelo Demoliner (semifinals)
4. (Argentina) Guillermo Durán / (Argentina) Renzo Olivo (final)

== Draw ==
=== Key ===
- Q = Qualifier
- WC = Wild card
- LL = Lucky loser
- Alt = Alternate
- SE = Special exempt
- PR = Protected ranking
- ITF = ITF entry
- JE = Junior exempt
- w/o = Walkover
- r = Retired
- d = Defaulted
- SR = Special ranking

=== Draw ===
First round
1	(Brazil) A Sá (Brazil) J Souza	6	6
(Italy) A Brizzi (France) L Pouille	1	1
(Argentina) M Alund (Argentina) P Heras
WC	(Brazil) A Ghem (Brazil) F Saretta	w/o
4	(Argentina) G Durán (Argentina) R Olivo	7^{7}	5	[10]
(Venezuela) R Maytín (Brazil) F Romboli	6^{5}	7	[2]
(Brazil) Leonardo Couto (Brazil) Mario Santos Neto	1	0
(Argentina) Gabriel Alejandro Hidalgo (Argentina) JI Londero	6	6
(Serbia) N Ćirić (Serbia) G Tošić	4	5
(Uruguay) A Behar (Venezuela) D Souto	6	7
PR	(Ecuador) E Gómez (Ecuador) G Lapentti	1	7^{10}	[4]
3	(Netherlands) T de Bakker (Brazil) M Demoliner	6	6^{8}	[10]
(Argentina) G Pella (Argentina) DS Schwartzman	4	6	[10]
(Brazil) R Hocevar (Brazil) Wilson Leite	6	3	[4]
WC	(Brazil) J Pereira (Brazil) Alexandre Tsuchiya	7^{7}	3	[8]
2	(Argentina) M González (Argentina) A Molteni	6^{5}	6	[10]

Quarterfinals
1	(Brazil) A Sá (Brazil) J Souza	6	6
WC	(Brazil) A Ghem (Brazil) F Saretta	4	1
4	(Argentina) G Durán (Argentina) R Olivo	6	6
(Argentina) GA Hidalgo (Argentina) JI Londero	3	3
(Uruguay) A Behar (Venezuela) D Souto	3	4
3	(Netherlands) T de Bakker (Brazil) M Demoliner	6	6
(Argentina) G Pella (Argentina) DS Schwartzman	3	5
2	(Argentina) M González (Argentina) A Molteni	6	7

Semifinals
1	(Brazil) A Sá (Brazil) J Souza	6	5	[10]
4	(Argentina) G Durán (Argentina) R Olivo	2	7	[12]
3	(Netherlands) T de Bakker (Brazil) M Demoliner	4	4
2	(Argentina) M González (Argentina) A Molteni	6	6

Final
4	(Argentina) G Durán (Argentina) R Olivo	5	4
2	(Argentina) M González (Argentina) A Molteni	7	6
