= 2011 Santos Brasil Tennis Open – Doubles =

Doubles
- 2011 Santos Brasil Tennis Open

Final
- Champions: (Brazil) Franco Ferreiro (Brazil) André Sá
- Runners-up: (Austria) Gerald Melzer (Brazil) José Pereira
- Score: 6–3, 6–3

Events
Singles	Doubles
← 2010 ·	Santos Brasil Tennis Open	· 2012 →

Franco Ferreiro and André Sá won the first edition of this tournament, defeating Gerald Melzer and José Pereira 6–3, 6–3 in the final.

== Seeds ==
1. (Brazil) Franco Ferreiro / (Brazil) André Sá (champions)
2. (Argentina) Martín Alund / (Argentina) Andrés Molteni (quarterfinals)
3. (United States) John Paul Fruttero / (Brazil) André Ghem (first round)
4. (Brazil) Marcos Daniel / (Portugal) Leonardo Tavares (first round)

== Draw ==
=== Key ===
- Q = Qualifier
- WC = Wild card
- LL = Lucky loser
- Alt = Alternate
- SE = Special exempt
- PR = Protected ranking
- ITF = ITF entry
- JE = Junior exempt
- w/o = Walkover
- r = Retired
- d = Defaulted
- SR = Special ranking

=== Draw ===
First round
1	(Brazil) F Ferreiro (Brazil) A Sá	6	2	[10]
(Brazil) M Demoliner (Brazil) F Romboli	4	6	[8]
(Slovenia) A Bedene (Russia) I Belyaev	6	7
(Finland) T Nieminen (Finland) J Paukku	2	6^{6}
3	(United States) JP Fruttero (Brazil) A Ghem	3	4
(Argentina) P Galdón (Brazil) C Zampieri	6	6
(Brazil) L Kirche (Brazil) J Silva
(Chile) N Massú (France) É Prodon	w/o
(Spain) Óscar Burrieza (Spain) J Martí	4	7	[9]
WC	(Brazil) Tiago Lopes (Chinese Taipei) T-h Yang	6	6^{5}	[11]
WC	(Austria) G Melzer (Brazil) J Pereira	2	7	[10]
4	(Brazil) M Daniel (Portugal) L Tavares	6	6^{5}	[6]
WC	(Brazil) Kaue Pereira (Brazil) Felipe Soares	5	0
(Sweden) C Lindell (Brazil) J Souza	7	6
(Brazil) Diego Matos (Brazil) A Miele	3	3
2	(Argentina) M Alund (Argentina) A Molteni	6	6

Quarterfinals
1	(Brazil) F Ferreiro (Brazil) A Sá
(Slovenia) A Bedene (Russia) I Belyaev	w/o
(Argentina) P Galdón (Brazil) C Zampieri	3	2
(Brazil) L Kirche (Brazil) J Silva	6	6
WC	(Brazil) Tiago Lopes (Chinese Taipei) T-h Yang	w/o
WC	(Austria) G Melzer (Brazil) J Pereira
(Sweden) C Lindell (Brazil) J Souza	7	5	[10]
2	(Argentina) M Alund (Argentina) A Molteni	6^{6}	7	[4]

Semifinals
1	(Brazil) F Ferreiro (Brazil) A Sá	6	1	[10]
(Brazil) L Kirche (Brazil) J Silva	4	6	[7]
WC	(Austria) G Melzer (Brazil) J Pereira
(Sweden) C Lindell (Brazil) J Souza	w/o

Final
1	(Brazil) F Ferreiro (Brazil) A Sá	6	6
WC	(Austria) G Melzer (Brazil) J Pereira	3	3
