= 2015 Campeonato Internacional de Tenis de Santos =

- Date: 20 – 26 April
- Edition: 5th
- Draw: 32S / 16D
- Prize money: $50,000
- Surface: Clay
- Location: Santos, Brazil

Champions

Singles
- (Slovenia) Blaž Rola

Doubles
- (Argentina) Máximo González / (Venezuela) Roberto Maytín
← 2014 ·	Campeonato Internacional de Tenis de Santos	· 2016 →

The 2015 Campeonato Internacional de Tenis de Santos was a professional tennis tournament played on clay courts. It was the fifth edition of the tournament which was part of the 2015 ATP Challenger Tour. It took place in Santos, Brazil between 20 and 26 April 2015.

== Singles main-draw entrants ==
=== Seeds ===
Country	Player	Rank^{1}	Seed
ARG	Máximo González	115	1
SLO	Blaž Rola	103	2
BRA	André Ghem	151	3
ARG	Guido Pella	156	4
USA	Chase Buchanan	168	5
BRA	Guilherme Clezar	182	6
CHI	Nicolás Jarry	196	7
ARG	Guido Andreozzi	201	8

- ^{1} Rankings are as of April 13, 2015.

=== Other entrants ===
The following players received wildcards into the singles main draw:

- (Brazil) Rogério Dutra Silva
- (Brazil) Thiago Monteiro
- (Brazil) Orlando Luz
- (Brazil) Marcelo Zormann

The following players received entry from the qualifying draw:

- (Brazil) Ricardo Hocevar
- (Brazil) José Pereira
- (Brazil) Pedro Sakamoto
- (Argentina) Agustín Velotti

The following players received an entry as a lucky loser:

- (Argentina) Federico Coria

== Champions ==
=== Singles ===
- (Slovenia) Blaž Rola def. (Belgium) Germain Gigounon, 6–3, 3–6, 6–3

=== Doubles ===
- (Argentina) Máximo González / (Venezuela) Roberto Maytín def. (Argentina) Andrés Molteni / (Argentina) Guido Pella, 6–4, 7–6^{(7–4)}
