= 2011 Santos Brasil Tennis Open – Singles =

Singles
- 2011 Santos Brasil Tennis Open

Final
- Champion: (Brazil) João Souza
- Runner-up: (Argentina) Diego Junqueira
- Score: 6–4, 6–2

Events
Singles	Doubles
- Santos Brasil Tennis Open

João Souza became the champion after beating Diego Junqueira in straight sets 6–4, 6–2.

== Seeds ==
1. (Brazil) Ricardo Mello (semifinals)
2. (Brazil) Marcos Daniel (first round)
3. (France) Éric Prodon (second round)
4. (Japan) Tatsuma Ito (second round, retired due to cramping)
5. (Argentina) Diego Junqueira (final)
6. (Argentina) Leonardo Mayer (quarterfinals)
7. (Brazil) João Souza (champion)
8. (Argentina) Juan Pablo Brzezicki (semifinals, retired)

== Draw ==
Key

- Q = Qualifier
- WC = Wild card
- LL = Lucky loser
- Alt = Alternate
- ITF = ITF entry
- PR = Protected ranking
- SR = Special ranking
- SE = Special exempt
- JE = Junior exempt
- JR = Junior Accelerator Programme entrant
- CO = College Accelerator Programme entrant
- NG = Next Gen Accelerator Program entrant
- w/o = Walkover
- r = Retired
- d = Defaulted

=== Finals ===
Semifinals
1	(Brazil) Ricardo Mello	2	6	3
7	(Brazil) João Souza	6	1	6
8	(Argentina) Juan Pablo Brzezicki	3	0^{r}
5	(Argentina) Diego Junqueira	6	2

Final
7	(Brazil) João Souza	6	6
5	(Argentina) Diego Junqueira	4	2

=== Top half ===
First round
1	(Brazil) R Mello	3	6	6
(Brazil) F Romboli	6	4	4
WC	(Brazil) J Pereira	6	6
WC	(Brazil) D Dutra da Silva	1	1
(Argentina) P Galdón	1	4
(Brazil) J Silva	6	6
Q	(Chinese Taipei) T-h Yang	3	6	2
6	(Argentina) L Mayer	6	2	6
3	(France) É Prodon	7	6
(Russia) I Belyaev	6^{2}	3
WC	(Brazil) Daniel Bustamante	1	2
(Argentina) S Decoud	6	6
(Argentina) F Bagnis	6	2	4
(Argentina) A Molteni	2	6	6
SE	(Brazil) M Demoliner	4	3
7	(Brazil) J Souza	6	6

Second round
1	(Brazil) R Mello	6	6
WC	(Brazil) J Pereira	1	3
(Brazil) J Silva	4	3
6	(Argentina) L Mayer	6	6
3	(France) É Prodon	6^{1}	4
(Argentina) S Decoud	7	6
(Argentina) A Molteni	5	6^{3}
7	(Brazil) J Souza	7	7

Quarterfinals
1	(Brazil) R Mello	4	6	6
6	(Argentina) L Mayer	6	3	4
(Argentina) S Decoud	2	7	3
7	(Brazil) J Souza	6	6^{3}	6

Semifinals
1	(Brazil) R Mello	2	6	3
7	(Brazil) J Souza	6	1	6

=== Bottom half ===
First round
8	(Argentina) JP Brzezicki	6	6
(Brazil) T Alves	4	1
Q	(Spain) J Martí	6	6
Q	(Brazil) A Ghem	2	3
(Portugal) L Tavares	0^{r}
(Japan) Y Sugita	2
(Brazil) C Zampieri	6^{5}	3
4	(Japan) T Ito	7	6
5	(Argentina) D Junqueira	7	6
WC	(Sweden) C Lindell	5	1
(Tunisia) M Jaziri	7	7
(Chile) N Massú	5	5
(Brazil) R Hocevar	3	4
SE	(Slovenia) A Bedene	6	6
Q	(Peru) I Miranda	6	6
2	(Brazil) M Daniel	4	4

Second round
8	(Argentina) JP Brzezicki	6	6
Q	(Spain) J Martí	1	3
(Japan) Y Sugita	7	4	3
4	(Japan) T Ito	5	6	1^{r}
5	(Argentina) D Junqueira	6	6
(Tunisia) M Jaziri	3	2
SE	(Slovenia) A Bedene	6	6
Q	(Peru) I Miranda	4	2

Quarterfinals
8	(Argentina) JP Brzezicki	1	6	6
(Japan) Y Sugita	6	3	2
5	(Argentina) D Junqueira	6
SE	(Slovenia) A Bedene	4^{r}

Semifinals
8	(Argentina) JP Brzezicki	3	0^{r}
5	(Argentina) D Junqueira	6	2
