= 2012 Campeonato Internacional de Tenis de Santos =

- Date: 16–22 April
- Edition: 2nd
- Surface: Clay
- Location: Santos, Brazil

Champions

Singles
- (Czech Republic) Ivo Minář

Doubles
- (Argentina) Andrés Molteni / (Argentina) Marco Trungelliti
← 2011 ·	Campeonato Internacional de Tenis de Santos	· 2013 →

The 2012 Campeonato Internacional de Tenis de Santos was a professional tennis tournament played on clay courts. It was the second edition of the tournament which was part of the 2012 ATP Challenger Tour. It took place in Santos, Brazil between 16 and 22 April 2012.

== Singles main draw entrants ==
=== Seeds ===
Country	Player	Rank^{1}	Seed
BRA	João Souza	99	1
SVN	Blaž Kavčič	112	2
CHI	Paul Capdeville	121	3
ARG	Diego Junqueira	123	4
BRA	Rogério Dutra da Silva	129	5
BRA	Ricardo Mello	130	6
BRA	Thiago Alves	160	7
ARG	Máximo González	161	8

- ^{1} Rankings are as of April 9, 2012.

=== Other entrants ===
The following players received wildcards into the singles main draw:

- (Brazil) Enrique Bogo
- (Brazil) Felipe Soares
- (Brazil) João Pedro Sorgi
- (Brazil) João Souza

The following players received entry from the qualifying draw:

- (Argentina) Guido Andreozzi
- (Bosnia and Herzegovina) Damir Džumhur
- (Brazil) Ricardo Hocevar
- (Argentina) Marco Trungelliti

== Champions ==
=== Singles ===
- (Czech Republic) Ivo Minář def. (Brazil) Ricardo Hocevar, 4–6, 6–1, 6–4

=== Doubles ===
- (Argentina) Andrés Molteni / (Argentina) Marco Trungelliti def. (Brazil) Rogério Dutra da Silva / (Brazil) Júlio Silva, 6–4, 6–3
