= 2016 Campeonato Internacional de Tenis de Santos =

- Date: 19 – 25 September
- Edition: 6th
- Draw: 32S / 16D
- Prize money: $50,000
- Surface: Clay
- Location: Santos, Brazil

Champions

Singles
- (Argentina) Renzo Olivo

Doubles
- (Peru) Sergio Galdós / (Argentina) Máximo González
| ← 2015 · | Campeonato Internacional de Tenis de Santos | · 2017 → |

The 2016 Campeonato Internacional de Tenis de Santos was a professional tennis tournament played on clay courts. It was the sixth edition of the tournament which was part of the 2016 ATP Challenger Tour. It took place in Santos, Brazil between 19 and 25 September 2016.

== Singles main-draw entrants ==
=== Seeds ===
| Country | Player | Rank^{1} | Seed |
|---|---|---|---|
| ARG | Facundo Bagnis | 87 | 1 |
| BRA | Thiago Monteiro | 101 | 2 |
| BRA | Rogério Dutra Silva | 103 | 3 |
| ARG | Renzo Olivo | 116 | 4 |
| BRA | João Souza | 125 | 5 |
| ARG | Guido Andreozzi | 131 | 6 |
| ARG | Nicolás Kicker | 135 | 7 |
| ARG | Máximo González | 144 | 8 |

- ^{1} Rankings as of September 12, 2016.

=== Other entrants ===
The following players received wildcards into the singles main draw:

- (Brazil) Felipe Meligeni Alves
- (Brazil) Osni Junior
- (Brazil) Rafael Matos
- (Brazil) Thiago Seyboth Wild

The following players received entry into the singles main draw with a protected ranking:

- (Brazil) Fabiano de Paula

The following players received entry from the qualifying draw:

- (Brazil) Oscar José Gutierrez
- (Brazil) Fabrício Neis
- (Brazil) Eduardo Dischinger
- (Brazil) Caio Silva

== Champions ==
=== Singles ===
- (Argentina) Renzo Olivo def. (Brazil) Thiago Monteiro 6–4, 7–6^{(7–5)}.

=== Doubles ===
- (Peru) Sergio Galdós / (Argentina) Máximo González def. (Brazil) Rogério Dutra Silva / (Brazil) Fabrício Neis 6–3, 5–7, [14–12].
