= 2016 Campeonato Internacional de Tenis de Santos – Singles =

Singles
- 2016 Campeonato Internacional de Tenis de Santos

Final
- Champion: (Argentina) Renzo Olivo
- Runner-up: (Brazil) Thiago Monteiro
- Score: 6–4, 7–6^{(7–5)}

Events
Singles	Doubles
- Campeonato Internacional de Tenis de Santos

Blaž Rola was the defending champion but chose not to defend his title.

Renzo Olivo won the title after defeating Thiago Monteiro 6–4, 7–6^{(7–5)} in the final.

== Seeds ==
1. (Argentina) Facundo Bagnis (quarterfinals)
2. (Brazil) Thiago Monteiro (final)
3. (Brazil) Rogério Dutra Silva (quarterfinals)
4. (Argentina) Renzo Olivo (champion)
5. (Brazil) João Souza (first round)
6. (Argentina) Guido Andreozzi (quarterfinals)
7. (Argentina) Nicolás Kicker (quarterfinals)
8. (Argentina) Máximo González (semifinals)

== Draw ==
Key

- Q = Qualifier
- WC = Wild card
- LL = Lucky loser
- Alt = Alternate
- ITF = ITF entry
- PR = Protected ranking
- SR = Special ranking
- SE = Special exempt
- JE = Junior exempt
- JR = Junior Accelerator Programme entrant
- CO = College Accelerator Programme entrant
- NG = Next Gen Accelerator Program entrant
- w/o = Walkover
- r = Retired
- d = Defaulted

=== Finals ===
Semifinals
(Argentina) Agustín Velotti	4	7	1
4	(Argentina) Renzo Olivo	6	5	6
8	(Argentina) Máximo González	6^{7}	5
2	(Brazil) Thiago Monteiro	7^{9}	7

Final
4	(Argentina) Renzo Olivo	6	7^{7}
2	(Brazil) Thiago Monteiro	4	6^{5}

=== Top half ===
First round
1	(Argentina) F Bagnis	6	6
(Argentina) Maximiliano Estévez	2	2
(Brazil) Wilson Leite	5	2
(Brazil) A Ghem	7	6
(Ecuador) G Escobar	6	6
(Brazil) Marvin Bernardo Spiering	3	2
(Argentina) A Velotti	5	6	7^{8}
5	(Brazil) J Souza	7	2	6^{6}
4	(Argentina) R Olivo	6	5	6
Q	(Brazil) Caio Silva	1	7	2
PR	(Brazil) F de Paula	6	6
Q	(Brazil) E Dischinger	0	2
(Argentina) F Argüello	6	3	3
(Argentina) F Mena	2	6	6
(Brazil) Carlos Eduardo Severino	2	1
6	(Argentina) G Andreozzi	6	6

Second round
1	(Argentina) F Bagnis	6	2	6
(Brazil) A Ghem	2	6	4
(Ecuador) G Escobar	6^{6}	2
(Argentina) A Velotti	7^{8}	6
4	(Argentina) R Olivo	6	7
PR	(Brazil) F de Paula	3	5
(Argentina) F Mena	2	2
6	(Argentina) G Andreozzi	6	6

Quarterfinals
1	(Argentina) F Bagnis	1	6	4
(Argentina) A Velotti	6	4	6
4	(Argentina) R Olivo	2	7^{7}	6
6	(Argentina) G Andreozzi	6	6^{3}	3

Semifinals
(Argentina) A Velotti	4	7	1
4	(Argentina) R Olivo	6	5	6

=== Bottom half ===
First round
8	(Argentina) M González	6	6
Q	(Brazil) Oscar José Gutierrez	1	3
(Sweden) C Lindell	1	6	2
(Argentina) JI Londero	6	4	6
WC	(Brazil) T Seyboth Wild	2	5
(Brazil) JP Sorgi	6	7
(Chile) Bastián Malla	4	6	1
3	(Brazil) R Dutra Silva	6	4	6
7	(Argentina) N Kicker	6	6
WC	(Brazil) F Meligeni Alves	2	1
(Brazil) A Miele	1	1
Q	(Brazil) F Neis	6	6
WC	(Brazil) R Matos	4	1
(Brazil) P Sakamoto	6	6
WC	(Brazil) Osni Junior	2	6^{3}
2	(Brazil) T Monteiro	6	7^{7}

Second round
8	(Argentina) M González	6	3	6
(Argentina) JI Londero	2	6	4
(Brazil) JP Sorgi	5	3
3	(Brazil) R Dutra Silva	7	6
7	(Argentina) N Kicker	6	6
Q	(Brazil) F Neis	3	4
(Brazil) P Sakamoto	3	3
2	(Brazil) T Monteiro	6	6

Quarterfinals
8	(Argentina) M González	6	6
3	(Brazil) R Dutra Silva	2	2
7	(Argentina) N Kicker	6	3	6^{4}
2	(Brazil) T Monteiro	4	6	7^{7}

Semifinals
8	(Argentina) M González	6^{7}	5
2	(Brazil) T Monteiro	7^{9}	7
