= 2013 Campeonato Internacional de Tenis de Santos – Singles =

Singles
- 2013 Campeonato Internacional de Tenis de Santos

Final
- Champion: (Portugal) Gastão Elias
- Runner-up: (Brazil) Rogério Dutra da Silva
- Score: 4–6, 6–2, 6–0

Events
| Singles | Doubles |
| ← 2012 · | Campeonato Internacional de Tenis de Santos | · 2014 → |

Ivo Minář was the defending champion but decided not to participate.
Gastão Elias won the title by defeating Rogério Dutra da Silva 4–6, 6–2, 6–0 in the final.

== Seeds ==
1. (Brazil) Rogério Dutra da Silva (final)
2. (Brazil) João Souza (quarterfinals)
3. (Italy) Matteo Viola (first round)
4. (Portugal) Gastão Elias (champion)
5. (Croatia) Antonio Veić (quarterfinals)
6. (Chile) Paul Capdeville (second round)
7. (Tunisia) Malek Jaziri (quarterfinals)
8. (Argentina) Guido Andreozzi (semifinals)

== Draw ==
=== Key ===
- Q = Qualifier
- WC = Wild card
- LL = Lucky loser
- Alt = Alternate
- SE = Special exempt
- PR = Protected ranking
- ITF = ITF entry
- JE = Junior exempt
- w/o = Walkover
- r = Retired
- d = Defaulted
- SR = Special ranking

=== Finals ===
Semifinals
1 | (Brazil) Rogério Dutra da Silva | 7 | 3 | 6
(Brazil) Guilherme Clezar | 5 | 6 | 3
4 | (Portugal) Gastão Elias | 2 | 6 | 6
8 | (Argentina) Guido Andreozzi | 6 | 4 | 2

Final
1 | (Brazil) Rogério Dutra da Silva | 6 | 2 | 0
4 | (Portugal) Gastão Elias | 4 | 6 | 6

=== Top half ===
First round
1 | (Brazil) R Dutra da Silva | 3 | 6 | 6
Q | (Portugal) R Machado | 6 | 4 | 1
Q | (Argentina) M González | 7 | 6^{5} | 6
SE | (Slovakia) J Kovalík | 5 | 7^{7} | 3
Q | (Austria) B Trinker | 4 | 2
WC | (Brazil) R Hocevar | 6 | 6
(Argentina) E Schwank | 4 | 1
7 | (Tunisia) M Jaziri | 6 | 6
3 | (Italy) M Viola | 3 | 6 | 1
WC | (Uruguay) P Cuevas | 6 | 4 | 6
(United States) D Kosakowski | 6^{4} | 4
(Brazil) G Clezar | 7^{7} | 6
WC | (Brazil) Caio Silva | 3 | 2
(Australia) J Duckworth | 6 | 6
(Croatia) N Mektić | 2 | 3
6 | (Chile) P Capdeville | 6 | 6

Second round
1 | (Brazil) R Dutra da Silva | 6 | 6
Q | (Argentina) M González | 3 | 3
WC | (Brazil) R Hocevar | 4 | 4
7 | (Tunisia) M Jaziri | 6 | 6
WC | (Uruguay) P Cuevas | 2 | 2
(Brazil) G Clezar | 6 | 6
(Australia) J Duckworth | 4 | 7^{8} | 7^{7}
6 | (Chile) P Capdeville | 6 | 6^{6} | 6^{3}

Quarterfinals
1 | (Brazil) R Dutra da Silva | 6 | 6
7 | (Tunisia) M Jaziri | 1 | 3
(Brazil) G Clezar | 6 | 6
(Australia) J Duckworth | 3 | 1

Semifinals
1 | (Brazil) R Dutra da Silva | 7 | 3 | 6
(Brazil) G Clezar | 5 | 6 | 3

=== Bottom half ===
First round
5 | (Croatia) A Veić | 6^{6} | 6 | 3
(Brazil) T Alves | 7^{8} | 2 | 0^{r}
(Argentina) A Velotti | 3 | 3
WC | (Brazil) J Silva | 6 | 6
(Chile) H Podlipnik-Castillo | 6 | 6
(Bosnia and Herzegovina) A Šetkić | 4 | 4
(Slovakia) P Červenák | 6 | 4 | 1
4 | (Portugal) G Elias | 3 | 6 | 6
8 | (Argentina) G Andreozzi | 6 | 6
(Brazil) L Kirche | 0 | 3
Q | (Italy) S Travaglia | 7^{7} | 2 | 6
SE | (Canada) S Diez | 6^{5} | 6 | 3
(France) P-H Herbert | 7 | 7
(Serbia) B Pašanski | 5 | 5
(Czech Republic) D Lojda | 1 | 1
2 | (Brazil) J Souza | 6 | 6

Second round
5 | (Croatia) A Veić | 4 | 6 | 6
WC | (Brazil) J Silva | 6 | 3 | 2
(Chile) H Podlipnik-Castillo | 2 | 1
4 | (Portugal) G Elias | 6 | 6
8 | (Argentina) G Andreozzi | 6 | 6
Q | (Italy) S Travaglia | 2 | 3
(France) P-H Herbert | 2 | 6 | 2
2 | (Brazil) J Souza | 6 | 4 | 6

Quarterfinals
5 | (Croatia) A Veić | 2 | 2
4 | (Portugal) G Elias | 6 | 6
8 | (Argentina) G Andreozzi | 6 | 6
2 | (Brazil) J Souza | 3 | 1

Semifinals
4 | (Portugal) G Elias | 2 | 6 | 6
8 | (Argentina) G Andreozzi | 6 | 4 | 2
