= 2013 Campeonato Internacional de Tenis de Santos =

- Date: 15 – 21 April
- Edition: 3rd
- Draw: 32S / 16D
- Prize money: $35,000+H
- Surface: Clay
- Location: Santos, Brazil

Champions

Singles
- (Portugal) Gastão Elias

Doubles
- (Slovakia) Pavol Červenák / (Italy) Matteo Viola
← 2012 ·	Campeonato Internacional de Tenis de Santos	· 2014 →

The 2013 Campeonato Internacional de Tenis de Santos was a professional tennis tournament played on clay courts. It was the third edition of the tournament which was part of the 2013 ATP Challenger Tour. It took place in Santos, Brazil between 15 and 21 April 2013.

== Singles main draw entrants ==
=== Seeds ===
Country	Player	Rank^{1}	Seed
BRA	Rogério Dutra da Silva	109	1
BRA	João Souza	111	2
ITA	Matteo Viola	118	3
POR	Gastão Elias	133	4
CRO	Antonio Veić	146	5
CHI	Paul Capdeville	154	6
TUN	Malek Jaziri	166	7
ARG	Guido Andreozzi	168	8

- ^{1} Rankings are as of April 8, 2013.

=== Other entrants ===
The following players received wildcards into the singles main draw:

- (Uruguay) Pablo Cuevas
- (Brazil) Ricardo Hocevar
- (Brazil) Caio Silva
- (Brazil) Júlio Silva

The following players received entry as a special exempt into the singles main draw:

- (Canada) Steven Diez
- (Slovakia) Jozef Kovalík

The following players received entry from the qualifying draw:

- (Argentina) Máximo González
- (Portugal) Rui Machado
- (Italy) Stefano Travaglia
- (Austria) Bastian Trinker

== Doubles main draw entrants ==
=== Seeds ===
Country	Player	Country	Player	Rank^{1}	Seed
CRO	Nikola Mektić	CRO	Antonio Veić	335	1
ARG	Guido Andreozzi	URU	Ariel Behar	567	2
BRA	Guilherme Clezar	POR	Gastão Elias	667	3
SRB	Boris Pašanski	BIH	Aldin Šetkić	692	4

- ^{1} Rankings as of April 8, 2013.

=== Other entrants ===
The following pairs received wildcards into the doubles main draw:

- (Brazil) Rogério Dutra da Silva / (Brazil) Eduardo Russi
- (Brazil) Allan Gomes Oliveira / (Brazil) Caio Silva
- (Brazil) Wilson Leite / (Brazil) João Souza

== Champions ==
=== Singles ===
- (Portugal) Gastão Elias def. (Brazil) Rogério Dutra da Silva, 4–6, 6–2, 6–0

=== Doubles ===
- (Slovakia) Pavol Červenák / (Italy) Matteo Viola def. (Brazil) Guilherme Clezar / (Portugal) Gastão Elias, 6–2, 4–6, [10–6]
