= 2016 Campeonato Internacional de Tenis de Santos – Doubles =

Doubles
- 2016 Campeonato Internacional de Tenis de Santos

Final
- Champions: (Peru) Sergio Galdós (Argentina) Máximo González
- Runners-up: (Brazil) Rogério Dutra Silva (Brazil) Fabrício Neis
- Score: 6–3, 5–7, [14–12]

Events
| Singles | Doubles |
- Campeonato Internacional de Tenis de Santos

Máximo González and Roberto Maytín were the defending champions but only González chose to defend his title, partnering Sergio Galdós. González successfully defended his title, defeating Rogério Dutra Silva and Fabrício Neis 6–3, 5–7, [14–12] in the final.

== Seeds ==
1. (Peru) Sergio Galdós / (Argentina) Máximo González (champions)
2. (Brazil) Rogério Dutra Silva / (Brazil) Fabrício Neis (final)
3. (Uruguay) Marcel Felder / (Argentina) Nicolás Kicker (quarterfinals)
4. (Brazil) André Ghem / (Brazil) Eduardo Russi Assumpção (quarterfinals)

== Draw ==
Key

- Q = Qualifier
- WC = Wild card
- LL = Lucky loser
- Alt = Alternate
- ITF = ITF entry
- PR = Protected ranking
- SR = Special ranking
- SE = Special exempt
- JE = Junior exempt
- JR = Junior Accelerator Programme entrant
- CO = College Accelerator Programme entrant
- NG = Next Gen Accelerator Program entrant
- w/o = Walkover
- r = Retired
- d = Defaulted

First round
1 | (Peru) S Galdós (Argentina) M González | 6 | 6
(Brazil) A Miele (Brazil) JP Sorgi | 1 | 3
(Argentina) F Mena (Argentina) A Velotti | 3 | 3
(Sweden) C Lindell (Brazil) Carlos Eduardo Severino | 6 | 6
4 | (Brazil) A Ghem (Brazil) E Russi Assumpção | 6 | 6
(Brazil) P Bernardi (Brazil) P Sakamoto | 3 | 3
(Brazil) F de Paula (Argentina) R Olivo | w/o
WC | (Brazil) F Meligeni Alves (Brazil) J Souza
(Brazil) Filipe Brandão (Brazil) Oscar José Gutierrez | 4 | 6 | [10]
(Brazil) E Dischinger (Brazil) Wilson Leite | 6 | 2 | [2]
WC | (Brazil) Osni Junior (Brazil) R Matos | 2 | 2
3 | (Uruguay) M Felder (Argentina) N Kicker | 6 | 6
(Chile) Bastián Malla (Brazil) Caio Silva | 6 | 6
WC | (Brazil) João Pedro Alcântara (Brazil) Luiz Eduardo Santos | 2 | 2
(Ecuador) G Escobar (Argentina) JI Londero | 2 | 1
2 | (Brazil) R Dutra Silva (Brazil) F Neis | 6 | 6

Quarterfinals
1 | (Peru) S Galdós (Argentina) M González | 6 | 6
(Sweden) C Lindell (Brazil) CE Severino | 2 | 2
4 | (Brazil) A Ghem (Brazil) E Russi Assumpção | 4 | 6 | [4]
(Brazil) F de Paula (Argentina) R Olivo | 6 | 1 | [10]
(Brazil) F Brandão (Brazil) OJ Gutierrez | 7 | 7^{7}
3 | (Uruguay) M Felder (Argentina) N Kicker | 5 | 6^{4}
(Chile) B Malla (Brazil) C Silva | 0 | 3
2 | (Brazil) R Dutra Silva (Brazil) F Neis | 6 | 6

Semifinals
1 | (Peru) S Galdós (Argentina) M González | 7^{7} | 6
(Brazil) F de Paula (Argentina) R Olivo | 6^{5} | 2
(Brazil) F Brandão (Brazil) OJ Gutierrez | 3 | 3
2 | (Brazil) R Dutra Silva (Brazil) F Neis | 6 | 6

Final
1 | (Peru) S Galdós (Argentina) M González | 6 | 5 | [14]
2 | (Brazil) R Dutra Silva (Brazil) F Neis | 3 | 7 | [12]
