= 2012 Campeonato Internacional de Tenis de Santos – Doubles =

Doubles
- 2012 Campeonato Internacional de Tenis de Santos

Final
- Champions: (Argentina) Andrés Molteni (Argentina) Marco Trungelliti
- Runners-up: (Brazil) Rogério Dutra da Silva (Brazil) Júlio Silva
- Score: 6–4, 6–3

Events
Singles	Doubles
← 2011 ·	Campeonato Internacional de Tenis de Santos	· 2013 →

Franco Ferreiro and André Sá were the defending champions but decided not to participate.
Andrés Molteni and Marco Trungelliti won the final against Rogério Dutra da Silva and Júlio Silva 6–4, 6–3.

== Seeds ==
1. (Argentina) Martín Alund / (Uruguay) Marcel Felder (semifinals)
2. (Croatia) Marin Draganja / (Croatia) Dino Marcan (first round)
3. (Brazil) Rodrigo Grilli / (Brazil) André Miele (first round)
4. (Slovenia) Blaž Kavčič / (Portugal) Leonardo Tavares (first round)

== Draw ==
=== Key ===
- Q = Qualifier
- WC = Wild card
- LL = Lucky loser
- Alt = Alternate
- SE = Special exempt
- PR = Protected ranking
- ITF = ITF entry
- JE = Junior exempt
- w/o = Walkover
- r = Retired
- d = Defaulted
- SR = Special ranking

=== Draw ===
First round
1	(Argentina) M Alund (Uruguay) M Felder	6^{5}	6	[10]
WC	(Brazil) Caio Silva (Brazil) Felipe Soares	7^{7}	4	[5]
WC	(Brazil) R Hocevar (Brazil) Tiago Lopes	6^{2}	1
(Poland) A Kapaś (Czech Republic) I Minář	7^{7}	6
3	(Brazil) Rodrigo Grilli (Brazil) A Miele	1	3
(Argentina) M González (Argentina) Nicolás Pastor	6	6
(Brazil) R Dutra da Silva (Brazil) J Silva	6	7^{7}
(Italy) M Crugnola (Italy) D Giorgini	1	6^{4}
(Serbia) N Ćirić (Montenegro) G Tošić	3	2
(Argentina) P Galdón (Argentina) G Pella	6	6
(Argentina) G Andreozzi (Argentina) F Argüello	7	6
4	(Slovenia) B Kavčič (Portugal) L Tavares	5	2
WC	(Brazil) F Romboli (Brazil) E Russi	3	1
(Australia) J Duckworth (Australia) M Reid	6	6
(Argentina) A Molteni (Argentina) M Trungelliti	2	6	[11]
2	(Croatia) M Draganja (Croatia) D Marcan	6	4	[9]

Quarterfinals
1	(Argentina) M Alund (Uruguay) M Felder	3	6	[10]
(Poland) A Kapaś (Czech Republic) I Minář	6	2	[6]
(Argentina) M González (Argentina) Nicolás Pastor	7	6^{6}	[2]
(Brazil) R Dutra da Silva (Brazil) J Silva	5	7^{8}	[10]
(Argentina) P Galdón (Argentina) G Pella	5	4
(Argentina) G Andreozzi (Argentina) F Argüello	7	6
(Australia) J Duckworth (Australia) Matt Reid	2	5
(Argentina) A Molteni (Argentina) M Trungelliti	6	6

Semifinals
1	(Argentina) M Alund (Uruguay) M Felder	4	2
(Brazil) R Dutra da Silva (Brazil) J Silva	6	6
(Argentina) G Andreozzi (Argentina) F Argüello	2	1
(Argentina) A Molteni (Argentina) M Trungelliti	6	6

Final
(Brazil) R Dutra da Silva (Brazil) J Silva	4	3
(Argentina) A Molteni (Argentina) M Trungelliti	6	6
