= 2011 Santos Brasil Tennis Open =

Tennis tournament

- Date: 18 – 24 April
- Edition: 1st
- Location: Santos, Brazil

Champions

Singles
- (Brazil) João Souza

Doubles
- (Brazil) Franco Ferreiro / (Brazil) André Sá
Santos Brasil Tennis Open	· 2012 →

The 2011 Santos Brasil Tennis Open was a professional tennis tournament played on clay courts. It was the first edition of the tournament which was part of the 2011 ATP Challenger Tour. It took place in Santos, Brazil between 18 and 24 April 2011.

== Singles main draw entrants ==
=== Seeds ===
Country	Player	Rank^{1}	Seed
BRA	Ricardo Mello	89	1
BRA	Marcos Daniel	105	2
FRA	Éric Prodon	125	3
JPN	Tatsuma Ito	135	4
ARG	Diego Junqueira	142	5
ARG	Leonardo Mayer	161	6
BRA	João Souza	174	7
ARG	Juan Pablo Brzezicki	176	8

- Rankings are as of April 11, 2011.

=== Other entrants ===
The following players received wildcards into the singles main draw:

- (Brazil) Daniel Bustamante
- (Brazil) Daniel Dutra da Silva
- (Sweden) Christian Lindell
- (Brazil) José Pereira

The following players received entry into the singles main draw as a special exemption:

- (Slovenia) Aljaž Bedene
- (Brazil) Marcelo Demoliner

The following players received entry from the qualifying draw:

- (Brazil) André Ghem
- (Spain) Javier Martí
- (Peru) Iván Miranda
- (Chinese Taipei) Yang Tsung-hua

== Champions ==
=== Singles ===
(Brazil) João Souza def. (Argentina) Diego Junqueira, 6–4, 6–2

=== Doubles ===
(Brazil) Franco Ferreiro / (Brazil) André Sá def. (Austria) Gerald Melzer / (Brazil) José Pereira, 6–3, 6–3
