= Germain Gigounon =

Belgian tennis coach and former professional player

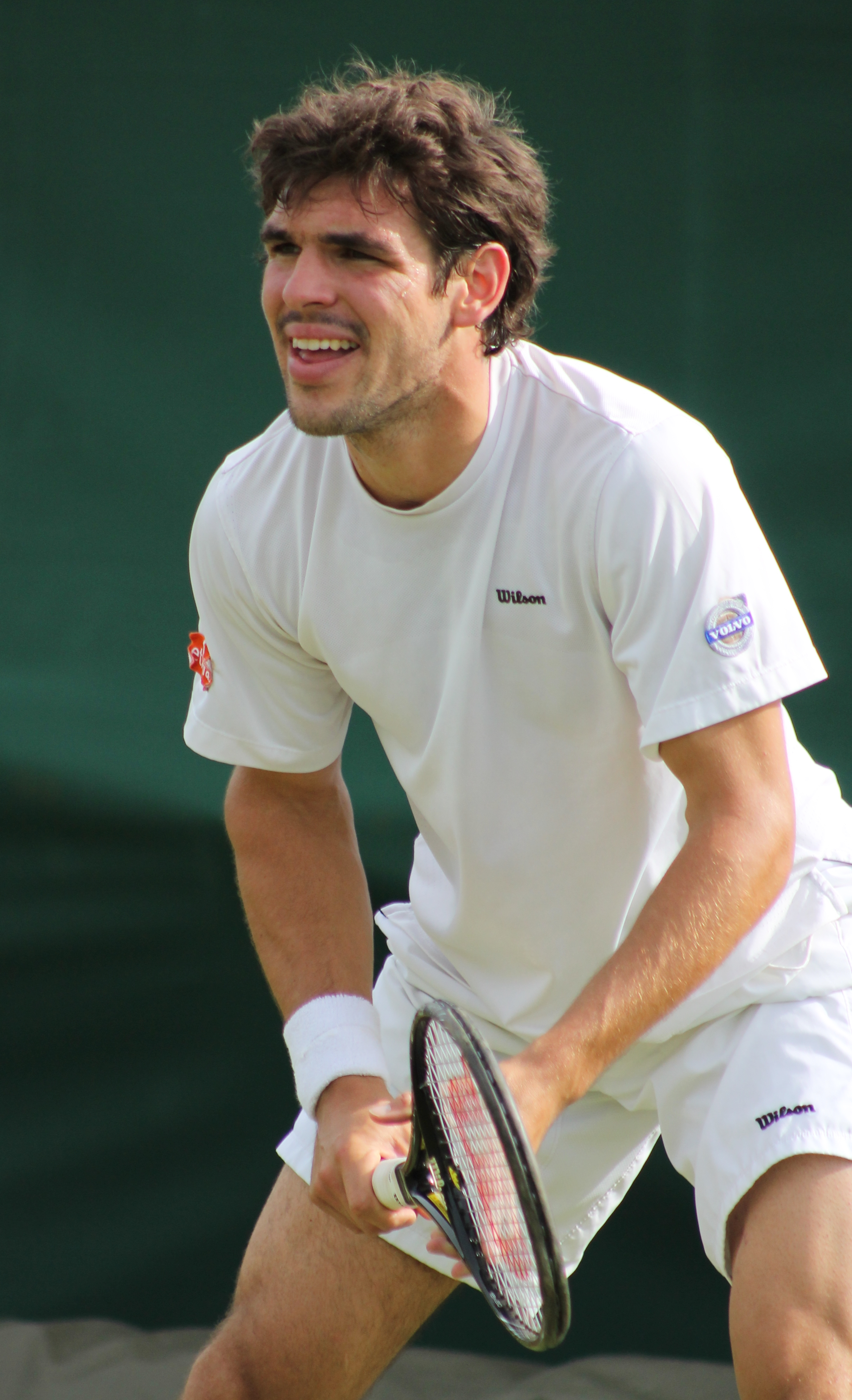
- Country (sports): Belgium
- Residence: Binche, Belgium
- Born: 20 April 1989 (age 36) Binche, Belgium
- Height: 1.78 m (5 ft 10 in)
- Retired: 2019
- Plays: Right-handed (one-handed backhand)
- Prize money: $238,600

Singles
- Career record: 0–1 (at ATP Tour level, Grand Slam level, and in Davis Cup)
- Career titles: 0
- Highest ranking: No. 185 (17 August 2015)

Grand Slam singles results
- Australian Open: Q2 (2014)
- French Open: 1R (2015)
- Wimbledon: Q2 (2014)
- US Open: Q2 (2015)

Doubles
- Career record: 0–0 (at ATP Tour level, Grand Slam level, and in Davis Cup)
- Career titles: 0
- Highest ranking: No. 253 (23 March 2015)
- Last updated on: 29 May 2018.

Germain Gigounon (born 20 April 1989) is a Belgian tennis coach and a former professional player. Gigounon has a career high ATP singles ranking of World No. 185, achieved in August 2015, and a career high ATP doubles ranking of No. 253, achieved in March 2015. Gigounon has won 15 ITF singles titles and 13 ITF doubles titles.

Gigounon made his Grand Slam main draw debut at the 2015 French Open where he qualified for the main draw, defeating Rui Machado, Alexander Kudryavtsev and Alejandro Falla.

Since November 2020, Gigounon has been coaching David Goffin. He had previously coached Ysaline Bonaventure and Yanina Wickmayer.

== Career finals ==
=== Challengers and Futures (23) ===
Legend
ATP Challengers (0–1)
ITF Futures (15–7)

Result	No.	Date	Tournament	Surface	Opponent	Score
Loss	1.	15 September 2008	Greece F4, Greece	Hard	(Belgium) David Goffin	1–6, 2–6
Win	2.	22 August 2011	Belgium F8, Belgium	Clay	(France) Takk Khun Wang	6–3, 6–4
Win	3.	19 September 2011	Croatia F9, Croatia	Clay	(Germany) Kevin Krawietz	2–6, 6–2, 6–3
Win	4.	9 July 2012	Belgium F3, Belgium	Clay	(Chile) Juan Carlos Sáez	6–4, 7–6^{(7–1)}
Loss	5.	20 August 2012	Belgium F9, Belgium	Clay	(Belgium) Alexandre Folie	7–6^{(4–7)}, 4–6
Win	6.	14 April 2013	Greece F3, Greece	Hard	(France) Alexis Musialek	6–0, 4–6, 7–6^{(7–5)}
Win	7.	22 April 2013	Greece F4, Greece	Hard	(Belgium) Kimmer Coppejans	6–3, 7–5
Win	8.	27 May 2013	Bulgaria F3, Bulgaria	Clay	(Poland) Grzegorz Panfil	2–6, 7–5, 7–6^{(7–6)}
Loss	9.	8 July 2013	France F12, France	Clay	(Belgium) Yannik Reuter	4–6, 0–6
Win	10.	26 August 2013	Belgium F11, Belgium	Clay	(United Kingdom) Ashley Hewitt	6–1, 6–1
Win	11.	14 April 2014	Egypt F14, Egypt	Clay	(France) Gleb Sakharov	4–6, 6–1, 6–2
Loss	12.	12 May 2014	Egypt F18, Egypt	Clay	(Slovakia) Adam Pavlásek	6–2, 0–6, 2–6
Win	13.	8 September 2014	Belgium F15, Belgium	Clay	(Belgium) Julien Cagnina	6–4, 7–6^{(7–3)}
Loss	14.	3 November 2014	Tunisia F6, Tunisia	Hard	(Italy) Alessandro Bega	1–6, 2–6
Loss	15.	20 April 2015	Santos, Brazil	Clay	(Slovenia) Blaž Rola	3–6, 6–3, 3–6
Win	16.	1 May 2016	Hungary F2, Hungary	Clay	(Poland) Kamil Majchrzak	6–4, 6–3
Win	17.	8 May 2016	Hungary F3, Hungary	Clay	(Czech Republic) Zdeněk Kolář	6–1, 6–0
Win	18.	29 May 2016	Bulgaria F2, Bulgaria	Clay	(Spain) David Pérez Sanz	7–6^{(7–4)}, 6–3
Loss	19.	5 June 2016	Bulgaria F3, Bulgaria	Clay	(Spain) Pedro Martínez	3–6, 1–6
Win	20.	30 October 2016	Greece F7, Greece	Hard	(Czech Republic) Dominik Kellovský	6–4, 6–4
Win	21.	18 March 2018	Spain F6, Spain	Clay	(Argentina) Marco Trungelliti	6–4, 6–3
Loss	22.	3 September 2018	Spain F26, Spain	Clay	(Spain) Eduard Esteve Lobato	3–6, 0–1
Win	23.	8 October 2018	Spain F31, Spain	Clay	(Spain) Nikolás Sánchez Izquierdo	6–7, 6–2, 6–1
