= Gastão Elias =

Portuguese tennis player (born 1990)

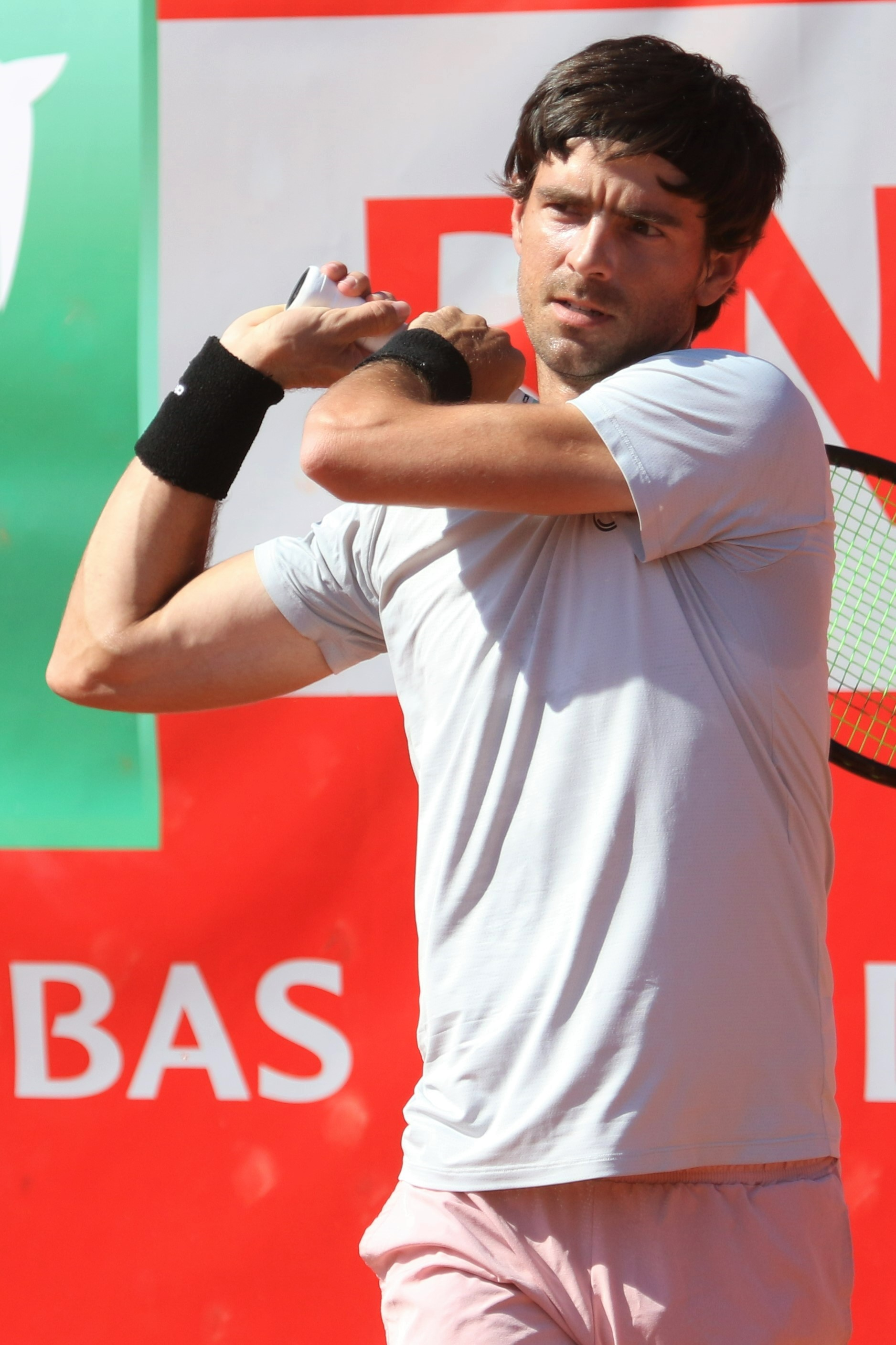
- Elias at the 2022 BNP Paribas Primrose Bordeaux
- Country (sports): Portugal
- Residence: Lourinhã, Portugal
- Born: 24 November 1990 (age 35) Lourinhã, Portugal
- Height: 1.80 m (5 ft 11 in)
- Turned pro: 2008
- Retired: 20 October 2026
- Plays: Right-handed (two-handed backhand)
- Coach: Luís Guilherme Balboa
- Prize money: US $1,566,670

Singles
- Career record: 31–56
- Career titles: 0
- Highest ranking: No. 57 (24 October 2016)
- Current ranking: No. 1,137 (31 August 2026)

Grand Slam singles results
- Australian Open: 1R (2017)
- French Open: 1R (2014, 2015, 2017)
- Wimbledon: 1R (2013, 2016, 2018)
- US Open: 1R (2016)

Other tournaments
- Olympic Games: 2R (2016)

Doubles
- Career record: 17–30
- Career titles: 0
- Highest ranking: No. 151 (15 August 2016)
- Current ranking: No. 959 (31 August 2026)

Grand Slam doubles results
- US Open: 1R (2016)

Other doubles tournaments
- Olympic Games: 2R (2016)
- Last updated on: 1 September 2026.

Gastão José Ministro Elias (Portuguese pronunciation: [gɐʃˈtɐ̃w eˈliɐʃ]; born 24 November 1990) is a Portuguese former professional tennis player, who competed on the ATP Challenger Tour. He reached a career-high singles ranking of world No. 57 to become the third highest-ranked Portuguese player, after João Sousa (No. 28) and Nuno Borges (No. 30). He became the fifth Portuguese tennis player to break into the top 100 of the ATP singles rankings.

== Early life ==
Gastão Elias was born in Lourinhã, Portugal. At age four, he started playing tennis with his father. In 2001, he participated in the national under-12 singles competition, falling to future Davis Cup partner João Sousa in the semifinals. Elias idolized James Blake and Roger Federer while growing up. He is a supporter of Sporting Clube de Portugal, Real Madrid C.F. and Liverpool F.C.

== Career ==
The year 2016 proved to be a breakthrough season for Elias. After winning an ATP Challenger Tour tournament in Turin by defeating Enrique López Pérez in three sets and earning position in the top 100, being ranked No. 94, Elias continued capitalizing on his Challenger Tour success as he won his sixth Challenger title in Mestre, Italy by defeating Horacio Zeballos in straight sets. In July, Elias made his first splash on ATP Tour tournament level in Båstad, Sweden after defeating Christian Lindell, Taro Daniel, and pulling an upset against compatriot João Sousa on his way to his first ATP Tour semifinal. However, in the semifinals, Elias lost to Fernando Verdasco. Later that month, Elias participated in another ATP Tour event in Umag, Croatia. Elias defeated Guillermo García López in the round of 32 and then pulled one of the biggest upsets of the tournament by defeating top seeded Pablo Cuevas in a close encounter. That win marked Elias' first win over a top-20 player. Elias then defeated Pablo Carreño Busta and reached his second consecutive ATP Tour semifinal, where he lost to Fabio Fognini in straight sets.

Elias retired in October 2026, his last tournament being the 2026 Lisboa Belém Open, where he competed as a wildcard.

== Playing style ==
Gastão Elias is an offensive baseliner who puts focus on hitting hard and accurate groundstrokes to push his opponents and hitting winners, however also making comparable amounts of winners to unforced errors. His serve and forehand shot are dangerous weapons, which are the main instruments in winning points, but his return game is one of the weaknesses, which can be exploited by the best players whose game is heavily based on strong serve and volley tactic. While feeling most comfortable at the baseline Elias makes occasional runs to the net, though these runs can not be classified as the key aspect of his game. Although his favourite surface is hard, most of his success has come on clay.

== ATP Challenger and ITF Tour finals ==
=== Singles: 35 (16 titles, 19 runner-ups) ===
Legend ATP Challenger Tour (10–13) ITF Futures/WTT (6–6)	Finals by surface Hard (6–6) Clay (10–13)

Result	W–L	Date	Tournament	Tier	Surface	Opponent	Score
Loss	0–1	Feb 2007	Spain F7, Cartagena	Futures	Hard	(Spain) Adrián Menéndez Maceiras	6–3, 2–6, 4–6
Win	1–1	Nov 2007	Mexico F11, Ciudad Obregón	Futures	Hard	(Spain) Pablo Martín Adalia	6–2, 6–3
Win	2–1	Jan 2008	USA F3, Boca Raton	Futures	Hard	(United States) Alberto Francis	7–5, 6–4
Loss	2–2	Nov 2010	Brazil F32, Barueri	Futures	Hard	(Brazil) Daniel Dutra da Silva	7–6^{(7–0)}, 6–7^{(3–7)}, 6–7^{(5–7)}
Win	3–2	Jan 2011	Brazil F1, São Paulo	Futures	Hard	(Brazil) André Ghem	6–3, 6–4
Win	4–2	Feb 2011	Colombia F2, Cartagena	Futures	Hard	(Tunisia) Malek Jaziri	6–3, 6–3
Loss	4–3	Mar 2011	USA F7, McAllen	Futures	Hard	(United States) Wayne Odesnik	7–6^{(7–5)}, 4–6, 1–6
Loss	0–1	Sep 2011	Belo Horizonte, Brazil	Challenger	Clay	(Brazil) Júlio Silva	4–6, 4–6
Loss	4–4	Oct 2011	Brazil F33, São Paulo	Futures	Clay	(Brazil) Júlio Silva	5–7, 5–7
Loss	0–2	Nov 2011	Buenos Aires, Argentina	Challenger	Clay	(Argentina) Carlos Berlocq	1–6, 6–7^{(3–7)}
Loss	0–3	Jan 2012	São Paulo, Brazil	Challenger	Hard	(Brazil) Thiago Alves	6–7^{(5–7)}, 6–7^{(1–7)}
Loss	0–4	Jun 2012	Caltanissetta, Italy	Challenger	Clay	(Spain) Tommy Robredo	3–6, 2–6
Win	1–4	Oct 2012	Rio de Janeiro, Brazil	Challenger	Clay	(Serbia) Boris Pašanski	6–3, 7–5
Loss	1–5	Oct 2012	Porto Alegre, Brazil	Challenger	Clay	(Germany) Simon Greul	6–2, 6–7^{(5–7)}, 5–7
Win	2–5	Apr 2013	Santos, Brazil	Challenger	Clay	(Brazil) Rogério Dutra da Silva	4–6, 6–2, 6–0
Loss	2–6	Apr 2014	Santos, Brazil	Challenger	Clay	(Argentina) Máximo González	5–7, 3–6
Loss	2–7	Jun 2014	Blois, France	Challenger	Clay	(Argentina) Máximo González	2–6, 3–6
Loss	2–8	Feb 2015	Bucaramanga, Colombia	Challenger	Clay	(Spain) Daniel Gimeno Traver	3–6, 6–1, 5–7
Win	3–8	Nov 2015	Lima, Peru	Challenger	Clay	(Slovakia) Andrej Martin	6–2, 7–6^{(7–4)}
Win	4–8	Nov 2015	Guayaquil, Ecuador	Challenger	Clay	(Argentina) Diego Schwartzman	6–0, 6–4
Win	5–8	Apr 2016	Turin, Italy	Challenger	Clay	(Spain) Enrique López Pérez	3–6, 6–4, 6–2
Win	6–8	May 2016	Mestre, Italy	Challenger	Clay	(Argentina) Horacio Zeballos	7–6^{(7–0)}, 6–2
Loss	6–9	Apr 2017	Barletta, Italy	Challenger	Clay	(United Kingdom) Aljaž Bedene	6–7^{(4–7)}, 3–6
Win	7–9	Oct 2017	Campinas, Brazil	Challenger	Clay	(Argentina) Renzo Olivo	3–6, 6–3, 6–4
Loss	7–10	Nov 2017	Montevideo, Uruguay	Challenger	Clay	(Uruguay) Pablo Cuevas	4–6, 3–6
Loss	4–5	Sep 2020	M15 Sintra, Portugal	WTT	Hard	(Portugal) Nuno Borges	2–6, 2–6
Win	5–5	Oct 2020	M25 Porto, Portugal	WTT	Hard	(Portugal) Nuno Borges	6–3, 6–3
Win	6–5	Feb 2021	M25 Villena, Spain	WTT	Hard	(Denmark) Holger Rune	3–6, 6–2, 6–1
Loss	6–6	Feb 2021	M25 Vale do Lobo, Portugal	WTT	Hard	(France) Evan Furness	2–6, 4–6
Loss	7–11	Apr 2021	Oeiras, Portugal	Challenger	Clay	(Czech Republic) Zdeněk Kolář	4–6, 5–7
Win	8–11	May 2021	Oeiras IV, Portugal	Challenger	Clay	(Denmark) Holger Rune	5–7, 6–4, 6–4
Win	9–11	Mar 2022	Oeiras, Portugal	Challenger	Clay	(Croatia) Nino Serdarušić	6-3, 6-4
Win	10–11	Apr 2022	Oeiras II, Portugal	Challenger	Clay	(Italy) Alessandro Giannessi	7–6^{(7–4)}, 6–1
Loss	10–12	Apr 2023	Girona, Spain	Challenger	Clay	Ivan Gakhov	7–5, 4–6, 0–0 ret.
Loss	10–13	Jan 2024	Oeiras, Portugal	Challenger	Hard (i)	(Poland) Maks Kaśnikowski	6–7^{(1–7)}, 6–4, 3–6

=== Doubles: 6 (2 titles, 4 runner-ups) ===
Legend ATP Challenger Tour (2–4) ITF Futures/WTT (0–0)	Finals by surface Hard (0–0) Clay (2–4)

Result	W–L	Date	Tournament	Tier	Surface	Partner	Opponents	Score
Loss	0–1	Nov 2011	São Leopoldo, Brazil	Challenger	Clay	(Portugal) Frederico Gil	(Brazil) Franco Ferreiro (Spain) Rubén Ramírez Hidalgo	7–6^{(7–4)}, 3–6, [9–11]
Loss	0–2	Apr 2013	Santos, Brazil	Challenger	Clay	(Brazil) Guilherme Clezar	(Slovakia) Pavol Červenák (Italy) Matteo Viola	2–6, 6–4, [6–10]
Win	1–2	Oct 2015	Porto Alegre, Brazil	Challenger	Clay	(Portugal) Frederico Ferreira Silva	(Chile) Cristian Garín (Chile) Juan Carlos Sáez	6–2, 6–4
Loss	1–3	Nov 2015	Guayaquil, Ecuador	Challenger	Clay	(Brazil) Fabrício Neis	(Argentina) Guillermo Durán (Argentina) Andrés Molteni	3–6, 4–6
Loss	1–4	Nov 2015	Montevideo, Uruguay	Challenger	Clay	(Brazil) Marcelo Demoliner	(Slovakia) Andrej Martin (Chile) Hans Podlipnik	4–6, 6–3, [6–10]
Win	2–4	Jan 2016	Rio de Janeiro, Brazil	Challenger	Clay	(Brazil) André Ghem	(France) Jonathan Eysseric (Mexico) Miguel Ángel Reyes-Varela	6–4, 7–6^{(7–2)}

== Performance timelines ==
Key
W	F	SF	QF	#R	RR	Q#	P#	DNQ	A	Z#	PO	G	S	B	NMS	NTI	P	NH

(W) winner; (F) finalist; (SF) semifinalist; (QF) quarterfinalist; (#R) rounds 4, 3, 2, 1; (RR) round-robin stage; (Q#) qualification round; (P#) preliminary round; (DNQ) did not qualify; (A) absent; (Z#) Davis/Fed Cup Zonal Group (with number indication) or (PO) play-off; (G) gold, (S) silver or (B) bronze Olympic/Paralympic medal; (NMS) not a Masters tournament; (NTI) not a Tier I tournament; (P) postponed; (NH) not held; (SR) strike rate (events won / competed); (W–L) win–loss record.
To avoid confusion and double counting, these charts are updated at the conclusion of a tournament or when the player's participation has ended.

=== Singles ===
Current through the 2022 Davis Cup.

Tournament	2006	2007	2008	2009	2010	2011	2012	2013	2014	2015	2016	2017	2018	2019	2020	2021	2022	SR	W–L	Win %
Grand Slam tournaments
Australian Open	A	A	A	A	A	A	A	A	A	Q1	Q1	1R	Q1	A	A	A	Q3	0 / 1	0–1	0%
French Open	A	A	A	A	A	A	Q1	Q2	1R	1R	A	1R	A	A	A	A	Q2	0 / 3	0–3	0%
Wimbledon	A	A	A	A	A	A	Q1	1R	Q2	Q2	1R	A	1R	A	NH	A	Q2	0 / 3	0–3	0%
US Open	A	A	A	A	A	Q2	Q1	A	Q2	Q1	1R	Q2	Q1	A	A	Q3	Q1	0 / 1	0–1	0%
Win–loss	0–0	0–0	0–0	0–0	0–0	0–0	0–0	0–1	0–1	0–1	0–2	0–1	0–1	0–0	0–0	0–0	0–0	0 / 8	0–8	0%
ATP 1000 tournaments
Indian Wells Open	A	A	A	A	A	A	Q1	Q1	A	Q1	A	1R	A	A	NH	A		0 / 1	0–1	0%
Miami Open	A	A	Q1	A	A	Q1	Q1	Q1	A	A	A	1R	Q1	A	NH	A		0 / 1	0–1	0%
Madrid Open^{1}	A	A	A	A	A	A	A	Q1	A	A	A	A	A	A	NH	A		0 / 0	0–0	N/A
Cincinnati Open	A	A	A	A	A	A	A	A	A	A	Q2	A	A	A	A	A		0 / 0	0–0	N/A
Win–loss	0–0	0–0	0–0	0–0	0–0	0–0	0–0	0–0	0–0	0–0	0–0	0–2	0–0	0–0	0–0	0–0	0–0	0 / 2	0–2	0%
National representation
Summer Olympics	Not Held		A	Not Held			A	Not Held			2R	Not Held				A		0 / 1	1–1	50%
Davis Cup	A	Z1	Z2	A	A	A	Z1	Z2	Z1	Z2	Z1	Z1	Z1	QR	A	WG1		0 / 10	7–11	39%
Career statistics
	2006	2007	2008	2009	2010	2011	2012	2013	2014	2015	2016	2017	2018	2019	2020	2021	2022	SR	W–L	Win %
Tournaments	1	0	1	0	0	1	1	3	6	2	13	14	8	0	0	0	0	48		
Titles	0	0	0	0	0	0	0	0	0	0	0	0	0	0	0	0	0	0		
Finals	0	0	0	0	0	0	0	0	0	0	0	0	0	0	0	0	0	0		
Hard win–loss	0–0	0–1	0–1	0–0	0–0	0–0	0–1	0–1	0–4	0–0	3–7	1–5	0–3	0–0	0–0	0–1	0–0	0 / 13	4–23	15%
Clay win–loss	0–1	0–0	0–2	0–0	0–0	0–1	0–1	3–2	3–4	1–2	10–6	3–3	2–4	0–0	0–0	0–0	1–0	0 / 21	25–29	46%
Grass win–loss	0–0	0–0	0–0	0–0	0–0	0–0	0–0	0–1	0–0	0–0	0–1	0–0	0–1	0–0	0–0	0–0	0–0	0 / 3	0–3	0%
Carpet win–loss	0–0	1–0	0–0	Discontinued														0 / 0	1–0	100%
Overall win–loss	0–1	1–1	0–3	0–0	0–0	0–1	0–2	3–4	3–8	1–2	13–14	7–11	2–8	0–0	0–0	0–1	1–0	0 / 36	31–56	36%
Win %	0%	50%	0%	N/A	N/A	0%	0%	43%	27%	33%	48%	39%	25%	–	–	0%		35.63%		
Year-end ranking	936	638	578	770	603	172	144	175	132	133	81	115	263	373	410	217	212	$1,325,422		

^{1}Held as Hamburg Masters (outdoor clay) until 2008, Madrid Masters (outdoor clay) 2009–present.

=== Doubles ===
Tournament	2006	2007	2008	2009	2010	2011	2012	2013	2014	2015	2016	2017	2018	2019	SR	W–L	Win %
Grand Slam tournaments
Australian Open	Absent														0 / 0	0–0	N/A
French Open	Absent														0 / 0	0–0	N/A
Wimbledon	Absent														0 / 0	0–0	N/A
US Open	Absent										1R	Absent			0 / 1	0–1	0%
Win–loss	0–0	0–0	0–0	0–0	0–0	0–0	0–0	0–0	0–0	0–0	0–1	0–0	0–0	0–0	0 / 1	0–1	0%
National representation
Summer Olympics	Not Held		A	Not Held			A	Not Held			2R	Not Held			0 / 1	1–1	50%
Davis Cup	A	Z1	Z2	A	A	A	Z1	Z2	Z1	Z2	Z1	Z1	Z1	Z1	0 / 8	9–12	43%
Career statistics
	2006	2007	2008	2009	2010	2011	2012	2013	2014	2015	2016	2017	2018	2019	SR	W–L	Win %
Tournaments	0	1	1	0	0	1	1	1	1	1	6	3	1	0	17		
Titles	0	0	0	0	0	0	0	0	0	0	0	0	0	0	0		
Finals	0	0	0	0	0	0	0	0	0	0	0	0	0	0	0		
Hard win–loss	0–0	0–1	0–1	0–0	0–0	0–0	0–2	1–0	0–2	0–0	1–4	0–0	0–2	1–0	0 / 3	3–12	20%
Clay win–loss	0–0	0–1	1–1	0–0	0–0	0–1	0–1	1–1	2–1	3–1	3–3	2–6	2–1	0–0	0 / 14	14–17	45%
Grass win–loss	0–0	0–0	0–0	0–0	0–0	0–0	0–0	0–0	0–0	0–0	0–0	0–0	0–0	0–0	0 / 0	0–0	N/A
Carpet win–loss	0–0	0–1	0–0	Discontinued											0 / 0	0–1	0%
Outdoor win–loss	0–0	0–1	1–1	0–0	0–0	0–1	0–2	1–0	2–1	3–1	4–5	1–5	2–3	0–0	0 / 15	14–20	41%
Indoor win–loss	0–0	0–2	0–1	0–0	0–0	0–0	0–1	1–1	0–2	0–0	0–2	1–1	0–0	1–0	0 / 2	3–10	23%
Overall win–loss	0–0	0–3	1–2	0–0	0–0	0–1	0–3	2–1	2–3	3–1	4–7	2–6	2–3	1–0	0 / 17	17–30	36%
Win (%)	N/A	0%	33%	N/A	N/A	0%	0%	67%	40%	75%	36%	25%	40%	100%	36.17%		
Year-end ranking	1257	659	713	1168	1384	506	469	543	280	212	292	273	335	1184	$79,741		

== Wins over top 10 players ==
Type	2006	2007	2008	2009	2010	2011	2012	2013	2014	2015	2016	2017	Total
Singles	0	0	0	0	0	0	0	0	0	0	1	0	1
Doubles	0	0	0	0	0	0	0	0	0	0	0	0	0

=== Singles ===
Elias has a 1–1 win–loss career record against ATP top 10-ranked players.

#	Opponent	Ranking	Tournament	Surface	Round	Score	Elias ranking
2016
1.	(France) Gaël Monfils	7	Stockholm Open, Sweden	Hard	2R	7–6^{(7–4)}, 6–1	61

== Career earnings ==
Year	Major titles	ATP titles	Total titles	Earnings	Ref
2006	0	0	0	$7,379	
2007	0	0	0	$7,882	
2008	0	0	0	$13,799	
2009	0	0	0	$4,758	
2010	0	0	0	$5,085	
2011	0	0	0	$47,148	
2012	0	0	0	$71,148	
2013	0	0	0	$97,085	
2014	0	0	0	$144,557	
2015	0	0	0	$112,164	
2016	0	0	0	$269,720	
2017	0	0	0	* $109,560	
Career *	0	0	0	$890,286	

* As of 10 April 2017

== National participation ==
=== Davis Cup (13 wins, 17 losses) ===
Elias debuted for the Portugal Davis Cup team in 2007 and has played 30 matches in 16 ties. His singles record is 6–8 and his doubles record is 7–9 (13–17 overall).

Group membership World Group (0–0) WG Play-off (0–0) Group I (6–13) Group II (7–4) Group III (0–0) Group IV (0–0)	Matches by surface Hard (1–14) Clay (11–2) Grass (0–0) Carpet (1–1)	Matches by Type Singles (6–8) Doubles (7–9)	Matches by Setting Indoors (5–15) Outdoors (8–2)	Matches by Venue Portugal (11–4) Away (2–13)

- ▲ ▼ indicates the result of the Davis Cup match followed by the score, date, place of event, the zonal classification and its phase, and the court surface.

Rubber result	Rubber	Match type (partner if any)	Opponent nation	Opponent player(s)	Score
▼2–3; 9–11 February 2007; Tbilisi Sport Palace, Tbilisi, Georgia; Group I Europe/Africa first round; carpet(i) surface
Defeat	III	Doubles (with Frederico Gil)	(Georgia (country)) Georgia	Lado Chikladze / Irakli Labadze	6–7^{(6–7)}, 7–6^{(9–7)}, 6–7^{(4–7)}, 7–5, 3–6
Victory	V	Singles (dead rubber)	(Georgia (country)) Georgia	George Khrikadze	6–3, 7–6^{(7–5)}
▼0–5; 21–23 September 2007; Ahoy, Rotterdam, Netherlands; Group I Europe/Africa relegation play-off; hard(i) surface
Defeat	II	Singles	Netherlands	Robin Haase	1–6, 1–6, 6–2, 7–5, 2–6
Defeat	III	Doubles (with Frederico Gil)	Netherlands	Jesse Huta Galung / Peter Wessels	2–6, 7–6^{(7–5)}, 6–7^{(5–7)}, 3–6
▲4–1; 11–13 April 2008; Clube de Tenis do Estoril, Estoril, Portugal; Group II Europe/Africa first round; clay surface
Victory	III	Doubles (with Leonardo Tavares)	Tunisia	Walid Jallali / Malek Jaziri	6–3, 6–3, 6–3
Defeat	IV	Singles (dead rubber)	Tunisia	Walid Jallali	5–7, 2–6
▼0–5; 19–21 September 2008; Megaron Tennis Club, Dnipropetrovsk, Ukraine; Group II Europe/Africa semifinal; hard (i) surface
Defeat	I	Singles	Ukraine	Sergiy Stakhovsky	4–6, 6–7^{(5–7)}, 4–6
Defeat	III	Doubles (with Leonardo Tavares)	Ukraine	Sergey Bubka / Sergiy Stakhovsky	3–6, 2–6, 4–6
▼2–3; 6–8 April 2012; Canada Stadium, Ramat HaSharon, Israel; Group I Europe/Africa quarterfinal; hard surface
Defeat	III	Doubles (with João Sousa)	Israel	Andy Ram / Jonathan Erlich	4–6, 4–6, 3–6
▼1–3; 14–16 September 2012; Aegon Arena, Bratislava, Slovakia; Group I Europe/Africa relegation play-off; hard(i) surface
Defeat	I	Singles	Slovakia	Martin Kližan	6–3, 2–6, 6–7^{(4–7)}, 2–6
Defeat	III	Doubles (with João Sousa)	Slovakia	Michal Mertiňák / Filip Polášek	5–7, 6–4, 6–7^{(5–7)}, 3–6
▲5–0; 5–7 April 2013; Club Internacional de Football, Lisbon, Portugal; Group II Europe/Africa quarterfinal; clay surface
Victory	I	Singles	Lithuania	Lukas Mugevičius	6–0, 6–1, 6–2
Victory	III	Doubles (with Rui Machado)	Lithuania	Lukas Mugevičius / Mantas Bugailiskis	6–3, 6–0, 6–2
▲3–2; 13–15 September 2013; Manejul de Atletica Usoara, Chișinău, Moldova; Group II Europe/Africa semifinal; hard(i) surface
Defeat	I	Singles	Moldova	Radu Albot	3–6, 6–2, 4–6, 4–6
Victory	III	Doubles (with João Sousa)	Moldova	Andrei Ciumac / Roman Borvanov	6–3, 6–4, 6–3
▼2–3; 31 January – 2 February 2014; Teniski klub Triglav Kranj, Kranj, Slovenia; Group I Europe/Africa first round; hard(i) surface
Defeat	II	Singles	Slovenia	Blaž Kavčič	6–7^{(14–16)}, 1–6, 4–6
Defeat	III	Doubles (with João Sousa)	Slovenia	Blaž Kavčič / Grega Žemlja	3–6, 5–7, 6–7^{(5–7)}
▼1–4; 12–14 September 2014; Olympic Stadium, Moscow, Russia; Group I Europe/Africa relegation play-off; hard(i) surface
Defeat	I	Singles	Russia	Andrey Kuznetsov	6–7^{(7–9)}, 4–6, 6–3, 1–6
Defeat	III	Doubles (with João Sousa)	Russia	Konstantin Kravchuk / Andrey Rublev	3–6, 4–6, 4–6
▲4–1; 17–19 July 2015; Clube de Ténis de Viana, Viana do Castelo, Portugal; Group II Europe/Africa quarterfinal; clay surface
Victory	III	Doubles (with João Sousa)	Finland	Henri Kontinen / Jarkko Nieminen	3–6, 7–6^{(7–5)}, 6–3, 6–4
▲3–2; 18–20 September 2015; Clube de Ténis de Viana, Viana do Castelo, Portugal; Group II Europe/Africa semifinal; clay surface
Victory	I	Singles	Belarus	Uladzimir Ignatik	6–3, 7–6^{(7–3)}, 7–5
Victory	III	Doubles (with João Sousa)	Belarus	Sergey Betov / Max Mirnyi	7–6^{(7–3)}, 4–6, 6–3, 6–7^{(5–7)}, 6–3
▼1–4; 4–6 March 2016; Pavilhão Vitória Sport Clube, Guimarães, Portugal; Group I Europe/Africa first round; hard(i) surface
Defeat	II	Singles	Austria	Dominic Thiem	6–3, 5–7, 3–6, 6–1, 6–7^{(6–8)}
Defeat	III	Doubles (with João Sousa)	Austria	Alexander Peya / Dominic Thiem	7–6^{(8–6)}, 7–6^{(7–4)}, 1–6, 3–6, 4–6
▲5–0; 16–18 September 2016; Clube de Ténis de Viana, Viana do Castelo, Portugal; Group I Europe/Africa second round playoffs; clay surface
Victory	II	Singles	Slovenia	Grega Žemlja	6–4, 7–6^{(7–1)}, 6–4
Victory	III	Doubles (with João Sousa)	Slovenia	Tom Kočevar-Dešman / Grega Žemlja	6–4, 6–4, 6–4
▲5–0; 3–5 February 2017; Club Internacional de Foot-ball, Lisbon, Portugal; Group I Europe/Africa first round; clay(i) surface
Victory	II	Singles	Israel	Dudi Sela	1–6, 6–2, 6–4, 6–2
Victory	III	Doubles (with João Sousa)	Israel	Jonathan Erlich / Dudi Sela	7–5, 6–7^{(4–7)}, 4–6, 6–2, 6–4
▲4–1; 7–9 April 2017; Club Internacional de Foot-ball, Lisbon, Portugal; Group I Europe/Africa second round; clay(i) surface
Victory	I	Singles	Ukraine	Artem Smirnov	6–4, 7–6^{(7–1)}, 6–7^{(6–8)}, 3–6, 6–1
Defeat	III	Doubles (with João Sousa)	Ukraine	Denys Molchanov / Artem Smirnov	7–5, 1–6, 3–6, 4–6
