= José Pereira (tennis) =

Brazilian tennis player (born 1991)

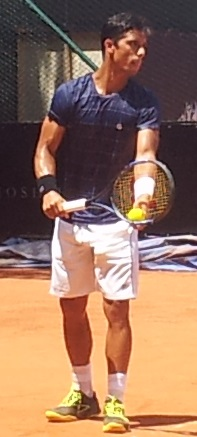
- Full name: José Pereira Jr
- Country (sports): Brazil
- Born: 26 January 1991 (age 35) Santana do Ipanema, Brazil
- Height: 1.80 m (5 ft 11 in)
- Plays: Right-handed (two-handed backhand)
- Coach: Richard Tsukada, Renato Pereira
- Prize money: US $243,017

Singles
- Career record: 0–0
- Career titles: 0
- Highest ranking: No. 232 (14 September 2015)
- Current ranking: No. 830 (10 August 2026)

Grand Slam singles results
- Australian Open: Q1 (2016)

Doubles
- Career record: 0–0
- Career titles: 0
- Highest ranking: No. 260 (10 February 2014)
- Current ranking: No. 584 (10 August 2026)
- Last updated on: 21 August 2026.

José Pereira (born 26 January 1991), also known as Zé Pereira, is a Brazilian professional tennis player. He has a career-high ATP singles ranking of No. 232 achieved on 14 September 2015 and a best doubles ranking of No. 260 achieved on 10 February 2014.

== Early life ==
José Pereira was born in Santana do Ipanema, Brazil. He and his family moved to a larger city, Curitiba, where his father got work at a tennis academy and eventually Pereira and his siblings became involved in the sport.

== Junior Circuit years ==
Pereira reached a combined ranking of world No. 4 on the ITF Junior Circuit and won two editions of the well-renowned junior event Copa Gerdau.

== Professional career ==
In 2010, Pereira won his first professional title. He attained his career-high singles ranking of No. 232 in September 2015 and reached the qualifying zone for the 2016 Australian Open. Injuries have hampered his progress over the years, but he still gets good results at ITF Tour events. He also reached finals at ATP Challenger tournaments in doubles.

== Personal life ==
Pereira has an elder sister, Teliana, who competed on the WTA Tour and had a successful career on women's tennis circuit.

== ATP Challenger Tour finals ==
=== Doubles: 4 (4 runner-ups) ===
Legend ATP Challenger Tour (0–4)	Finals by surface Hard (0–1) Clay (0–3)

Result	W–L	Date	Tournament	Tier	Surface	Partner	Opponents	Score
Loss	0–1	Apr 2011	Brasil Tennis Open, Brazil	Challenger	Clay	(Austria) Gerald Melzer	(Brazil) André Sá (Brazil) Franco Ferreiro	3–6, 3–6
Loss	0–2	Jan 2012	Aberto de São Paulo, Brazil	Challenger	Hard	(Slovakia) Jozef Kovalík	(Brazil) Fernando Romboli (Brazil) Júlio Silva	5–7, 2–6
Loss	0–3	Apr 2016	São Paulo Challenger, Brazil	Challenger	Clay	(Brazil) Alexandre Tsuchiya	(Brazil) Fabrício Neis (Brazil) Caio Zampieri	4–6, 6–7^{(3)}
Loss	0–4	Oct 2017	São Paulo Challenger, Brazil	Challenger	Clay	(Portugal) Gastão Elias	(Argentina) Máximo González (Brazil) Fabrício Neis	1–6, 1–6

== ITF Tour finals ==
=== Singles: 34 (12 titles, 22 runner-ups) ===
Legend ITF Futures/WTT (12–22)	Finals by surface Hard (4–3) Clay (8–19)

Result	W–L	Date	Tournament	Tier	Surface	Opponent	Score
Loss	0–1	May 2009	Brazil F3, Uberlândia	Futures	Clay	(Brazil) Júlio Silva	6–4, 3–6, 3–6
Win	1–1	Apr 2010	Brazil F2, Bauru	Futures	Clay	(Argentina) Alejandro Kon	6–4, 6–3
Win	2–1	Jul 2011	Brazil F21, Curitiba	Futures	Hard	(Brazil) Tiago Lopes	7–6^{(4)}, 6–2
Loss	2–2	Feb 2012	Brazil F7, Lages	Futures	Clay	(Brazil) Marcelo Demoliner	5–7, 4–6
Loss	2–3	Apr 2012	Argentina F5, Villa del Dique	Futures	Clay	(Argentina) Renzo Olivo	5–7, 7–6^{(7)}, 4–6
Win	3–3	Aug 2012	Brazil F20, Lorena	Futures	Clay	(Brazil) Nicolas Santos	6–3, 6–7^{(4)}, 6–3
Loss	3–4	Sep 2012	Brazil F24, Arapongas	Futures	Clay	(Brazil) Thales Turini	6–7^{(2)}, 6–4, 6–7^{(5)}
Loss	3–5	Jun 2013	Mexico F12, Quintana Roo	Futures	Hard	(Slovenia) Blaž Rola	6–7^{(6)}, 4–6
Win	4–5	Aug 2013	Brazil F3, Porto Velho	Futures	Hard	(Brazil) Thales Turini	6–3, 6–1
Loss	4–6	Aug 2013	Brazil F5, Natal	Futures	Clay	(Brazil) Fernando Romboli	6–7^{(4)}, 2–6
Loss	4–7	Sep 2013	Brazil F10, São José do Rio Preto	Futures	Clay	(Brazil) João Pedro Sorgi	3–6, 7–5, 6–7^{(4)}
Win	5–7	Dec 2013	Brazil F20, Santa Maria	Futures	Clay	(Sweden) Christian Lindell	7–5, 6–7^{(5)}, 6–2
Loss	5–8	Feb 2014	Egypt F4, Sharm El Sheikh	Futures	Clay	(Italy) Stefano Travaglia	2–6, 4–6
Loss	5–9	Oct 2014	Chile F4, Santiago	Futures	Clay	(Chile) Jorge Aguilar	6–7^{(4)}, 4–6
Loss	5–10	Oct 2014	Chile F6, Villa Alemana	Futures	Clay	(Chile) Cristóbal Saavedra	6–7^{(7)}, 3–6
Win	6–10	Jan 2015	Turkey F2, Antalya	Futures	Hard	(Russia) Alexey Vatutin	6–4, 6–3
Loss	6–11	Jan 2015	Turkey F3, Antalya	Futures	Hard	(Netherlands) Miliaan Niesten	1–6, 6–2, 3–6
Win	7–11	Jan 2015	Turkey F4, Antalya	Futures	Hard	(Italy) Riccardo Bellotti	7–5, 4–6, 6–2
Loss	7–12	Mar 2015	Turkey F9, Antalya	Futures	Clay	(Spain) Oriol Roca Batalla	5–7, 6–7^{(2)}
Win	8–12	Jun 2015	Netherlands F1, Alkmaar	Futures	Clay	(Germany) Jean-Marc Werner	6–1, 6–2
Loss	8–13	Aug 2015	Colombia F6, Medellín	Futures	Clay	(Colombia) Eduardo Struvay	2–6, 5–7
Loss	8–14	Aug 2015	Colombia F7, Bucaramanga	Futures	Clay	(Venezuela) Nicolás Barrientos	6–1, 3–6, 4–6
Win	9–14	Nov 2015	Brazil F9, São Paulo	Futures	Clay	(Brazil) Ricardo Hocevar	6–3, 6–1
Loss	9–15	Jun 2016	Netherlands F1, Alkmaar	Futures	Clay	(Portugal) Pedro Sousa	6–3, 5–7, 3–6
Win	10–15	Jul 2016	Brazil F4, Campos do Jordão	Futures	Clay	(Argentina) Mateo Nicolás Martínez	7–5, 7–5
Win	11–15	Nov 2017	Brazil F3, São Paulo	Futures	Clay	(Portugal) Bernardo Saraiva	6–4, 6–3
Loss	11–16	Aug 2021	M25 Guayaquil, Ecuador	WTT	Clay	(Colombia) Cristian Rodríguez	3–6, 6–7^{(3)}
Loss	11–17	Sep 2021	M15 Recife, Brazil	WTT	Clay (i)	(Brazil) Gustavo Heide	4–6, 2–6
Win	12–17	Jun 2022	M15 Frascati, Italy	WTT	Clay	(Italy) Manuel Mazza	6–3, 6–0
Loss	12–18	Aug 2022	M25 Portoviejo, Ecuador	WTT	Clay	(Chile) Matías Soto	3–6, 6–7^{(4)}
Loss	12–19	Oct 2022	M25 Rio de Janeiro, Brazil	WTT	Clay	(Brazil) Wilson Leite	3–6, 2–6
Loss	12–20	Aug 2024	M25 Londrina, Brazil	WTT	Hard	(Brazil) Karuê Sell	4–6, 4–6
Loss	12–21	Nov 2025	M15 Criciúma, Brazil	WTT	Clay	(Brazil) Eduardo Ribeiro	4–6, 3–6
Loss	12–22	Nov 2025	M15 Ribeirão Preto, Brazil	WTT	Clay	(Brazil) Nicolas Oliveira	4–6, 6–4, 3–6

=== Doubles: 29 (19 titles, 10 runner-ups) ===
Legend ITF Futures/WTT (19–10)	Finals by surface Hard (3–2) Clay (16–8)

Result	W–L	Date	Tournament	Tier	Surface	Partner	Opponents	Score
Loss	0–1	May 2010	Brazil F5, Teresina	Futures	Clay	(Brazil) Alexandre Bonatto	(Mexico) Luis Díaz Barriga (Mexico) Miguel Ángel Reyes-Varela	4–6, 6–3, [7–10]
Loss	0–2	Oct 2010	Brazil F29, São Leopoldo	Futures	Clay	(Brazil) Fabrício Neis	(Brazil) Fernando Romboli (Brazil) Nicolas Santos	4–6, 2–6
Win	1–2	Sep 2011	Brazil F29, Arapongas	Futures	Clay	(Brazil) Bruno Semenzato	(Brazil) Diego Matos (Brazil) Nicolas Santos	6–3, 7–5
Loss	1–3	May 2012	Brazil F9, Goiânia	Futures	Clay	(Brazil) Fabrício Neis	(Brazil) Nicolas Santos (Brazil) Ricardo Siggia	3–6, 6–7^{(6)}
Loss	1–4	May 2012	Brazil F10, Manaus	Futures	Clay	(Brazil) Fabrício Neis	(Brazil) Guilherme Clezar (United States) Andrea Collarini	6–7^{(7)}, 6–3, [5–10]
Loss	1–5	Jul 2012	Brazil F18, Pelotas	Futures	Clay	(Brazil) Diego Matos	(Brazil) Thales Turini (Brazil) Fabrício Neis	4–6, 2–6
Win	2–5	Aug 2012	Brazil F20, Lorena	Futures	Clay	(Brazil) João Pedro Sorgi	(Brazil) Caio Silva (Brazil) Thales Turini	3–6, 6–4, [10–8]
Win	3–5	Aug 2012	Brazil F21, São José do Rio Preto	Futures	Clay	(Argentina) Maximiliano Estévez	(Brazil) Fabiano de Paula (Brazil) Bruno Sant'Anna	6–2, 6–1
Loss	3–6	Jun 2013	Mexico F12, Quintana Roo	Futures	Hard	(Mexico) Alejandro Moreno Figueroa	(Germany) Jonas Lütjen (Germany) Yannick Hanfmann	7–6^{(2)}, 6–7^{(3)}, [8–10]
Win	4–6	Aug 2013	Brazil F3, Porto Velho	Futures	Hard	(Brazil) Alexandre Tsuchiya	(Brazil) Fabrício Neis (Brazil) Nicolas Santos	7–6^{(5)}, 6–2
Win	5–6	Aug 2013	Brazil F4, Manaus	Futures	Clay	(Dominican Republic) José Hernández-Fernández	(Brazil) Victor Maynard (Brazil) Rafael Rondino	6–1, 6–1
Loss	5–7	Aug 2013	Brazil F6, Campos do Jordão	Futures	Hard	(Brazil) Alexandre Tsuchiya	(Brazil) João Pedro Sorgi (Brazil) André Miele	4–6, 4–6
Win	6–7	Sep 2013	Brazil F9, Belém	Futures	Hard	(Brazil) Alexandre Tsuchiya	(Brazil) Fernando Romboli (Brazil) Rafael Camilo	7–6^{(5)}, 7–6^{(9)}
Win	7–7	Oct 2013	Brazil F10, São José do Rio Preto	Futures	Clay	(Brazil) Alexandre Tsuchiya	(Brazil) Eduardo Dischinger (Brazil) Bruno Sant'Anna	6–1, 7–6^{(1)}
Loss	7–8	Dec 2013	Brazil F19, Porto Alegre	Futures	Clay	(Brazil) Alexandre Tsuchiya	(Brazil) Fabrício Neis (Brazil) Rafael Camilo	4–6, 6–7^{(4)}
Win	8–8	Dec 2013	Brazil F20, Santa Maria	Futures	Clay	(Brazil) Alexandre Tsuchiya	(Argentina) Guillermo Durán (Sweden) Christian Lindell	7–5, 6–3
Win	9–8	Jan 2014	Egypt F1, Sharm El Sheikh	Futures	Clay	(France) Tak Khunn Wang	(Italy) Alberto Brizzi (Italy) Gianluca Naso	6–3, 1–6, [10–1]
Win	10–8	Jan 2014	Egypt F1, Sharm El Sheikh	Futures	Clay	(France) Tak Khunn Wang	(Italy) Stefano Travaglia (Italy) Lorenzo Frigerio	1–6, 6–3, [10–8]
Win	11–8	Feb 2014	Egypt F1, Sharm El Sheikh	Futures	Clay	(Italy) Stefano Travaglia	(Serbia) Miljan Zekić (Serbia) Arsenije Zlatanović	2–6, 6–3, [10–8]
Win	12–8	Oct 2014	Chile F4, Santiago	Futures	Clay	(Brazil) Fabrício Neis	(Chile) Cristóbal Saavedra (Chile) Ricardo Urzúa Rivera	6–1, 6–1
Win	13–8	Oct 2014	Chile F5, Coquimbo	Futures	Clay	(Brazil) Fabrício Neis	(Chile) Víctor Núñez (Chile) Hans Podlipnik Castillo	5–7, 6–2, [13–11]
Win	14–8	Nov 2015	Brazil F8, Campos do Jordão	Futures	Hard	(Brazil) Alexandre Tsuchiya	(Brazil) Pedro Bernardi (Brazil) Pedro Sakamoto	6–3, 6–2
Win	15–8	Jul 2016	Netherlands F4, Amstelveen	Futures	Clay	(Netherlands) David Pel	(Netherlands) Miliaan Niesten (Netherlands) Boy Westerhof	6–4, 3–6, [10–3]
Win	16–8	Jul 2017	Austria F4, St. Poelten	Futures	Clay	(Brazil) Daniel Dutra da Silva	(Austria) Matthias Haim (Austria) Philipp Schroll	6–3, 6–3
Win	17–8	Aug 2017	Germany F9, Essen	Futures	Clay	(Brazil) Daniel Dutra da Silva	(Germany) Elmar Ejupovic (Germany) Christian Hirschmueller	6–2, 6–2
Loss	17–9	Sep 2017	Argentina F6, Buenos Aires	Futures	Clay	(Brazil) Daniel Dutra da Silva	(Argentina) Maximiliano Estévez (Argentina) Facundo Argüello	5–7, 1–6
Loss	17–10	Oct 2018	Brazil F6, Curitiba	Futures	Clay	(Brazil) Felipe Meligeni Alves	(Brazil) Bernardo Azevedo Pereira (Brazil) Eduardo Ribeiro	6–4, 2–6, [9–11]
Win	18–10	Oct 2019	M15 São Paulo, Brazil	WTT	Clay	(Brazil) Igor Marcondes	(Chile) Bastián Malla (Chile) Michel Vernier	7–6^{5}, 4–6, [11–9]
Win	19–10	Feb 2022	M15 Naples, US	WTT	Clay	(Brazil) Pedro Boscardin Dias	(United States) Colin Markes (New Zealand) Kiranpal Pannu	0–6, 6–2, [14–12]
