= Campeonato Internacional de Tenis de Santos =

Defunct Tennis tournament held in Santos, Brazil

Defunct tennis tournament
- Location: Santos, Brazil
- Venue: Tênis Clube de Santos
- Category: ATP Challenger Tour
- Surface: Clay
- Draw: 32S/32Q/16D
- Prize money: $35,000+H
- Website: Website

The Campeonato Internacional de Tênis de Santos (formerly known as the Santos Brasil Tennis Open) was a tennis tournament held in Santos, Brazil, from 2011 until 2016. The event was part of the ATP Challenger Tour and was played on clay courts.

== Past finals ==
=== Singles ===
Year	Champion	Runner-up	Score
2016	(Argentina) Renzo Olivo	(Brazil) Thiago Monteiro	6–4, 7–6^{(7–5)}
2015	(Slovenia) Blaž Rola	(Belgium) Germain Gigounon	6–3, 3–6, 6–3
2014	(Argentina) Máximo González	(Portugal) Gastão Elias	7–5, 6–3
2013	(Portugal) Gastão Elias	(Brazil) Rogério Dutra da Silva	4–6, 6–2, 6–0
2012	(Czech Republic) Ivo Minář	(Brazil) Ricardo Hocevar	4–6, 6–1, 6–4
2011	(Brazil) João Souza	(Argentina) Diego Junqueira	6–4, 6–2

=== Doubles ===
Year	Champions	Runners-up	Score
2016	(Peru) Sergio Galdós (Argentina) Máximo González	(Brazil) Rogério Dutra Silva (Brazil) Fabrício Neis	6–3, 5–7, [14-12]
2015	(Argentina) Máximo González (Venezuela) Roberto Maytín	(Argentina) Andrés Molteni (Argentina) Guido Pella	6–4, 7–6^{(7–4)}
2014	(Argentina) Máximo González (Argentina) Andrés Molteni	(Argentina) Guillermo Duran (Argentina) Renzo Olivo	7–5, 6–4
2013	(Slovakia) Pavol Červenák (Italy) Matteo Viola	(Brazil) Guilherme Clezar (Portugal) Gastão Elias	6–2, 4–6, [10–6]
2012	(Argentina) Andrés Molteni (Argentina) Marco Trungelliti	(Brazil) Rogério Dutra da Silva (Brazil) Júlio Silva	6–4, 6–3
2011	(Brazil) Franco Ferreiro (Brazil) André Sá	(Austria) Gerald Melzer (Brazil) José Pereira	6–3, 6–3
