= Rogério Dutra Silva =

Brazilian tennis player

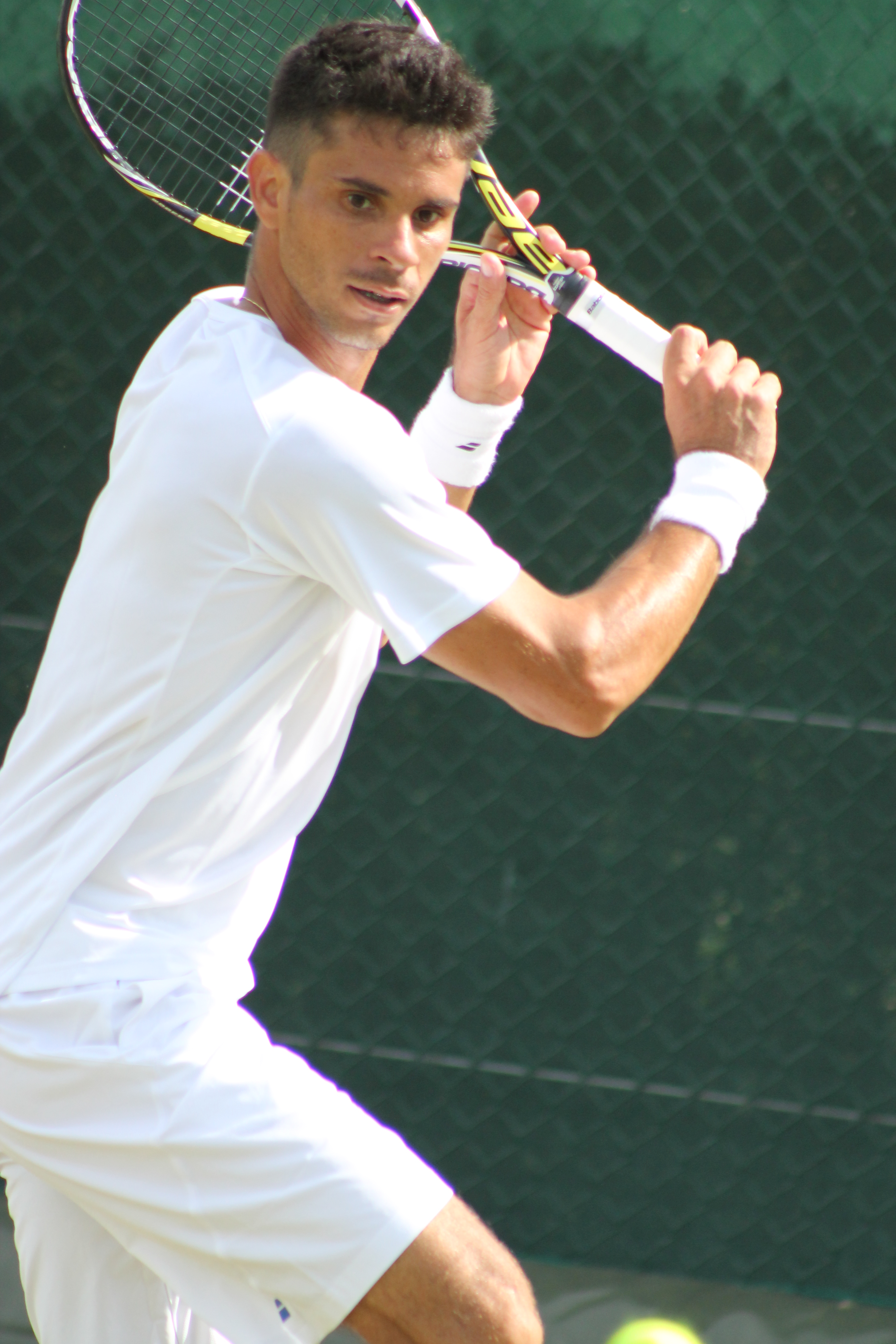
- Country (sports): Brazil
- Residence: São Paulo, Brazil
- Born: February 3, 1984 (age 42) São Paulo, Brazil
- Height: 1.78 m (5 ft 10 in)
- Turned pro: 2003
- Retired: 2022
- Plays: Right-handed (one-handed backhand)
- Prize money: $1,854,319

Singles
- Career record: 30–65 (ATP Tour level, Grand Slam level, and Davis Cup)
- Career titles: 0
- Highest ranking: No. 63 (24 July 2017)

Grand Slam singles results
- Australian Open: 2R (2017)
- French Open: 2R (2017)
- Wimbledon: 1R (2013, 2016, 2017)
- US Open: 2R (2011, 2012, 2013)

Other tournaments
- Olympic Games: 2R (2016)

Doubles
- Career record: 26–26 (ATP Tour level, Grand Slam level, and Davis Cup)
- Career titles: 1
- Highest ranking: No. 84 (26 February 2018)

Grand Slam doubles results
- French Open: QF (2017)
- Wimbledon: 1R (2017)
- US Open: 2R (2017)
Medal record
Pan American Games
Silver medal – second place	2011 Guadalajara	Singles
Bronze medal – third place	2011 Guadalajara	Mixed Doubles

Rogério Dutra da Silva (Brazilian Portuguese: [ʁoˈʒɛɾju ˈdutɾɐ dɐ ˈsiwvɐ]; born February 3, 1984) is a Brazilian former professional tennis player.

Dutra Silva had a career high ATP singles ranking of 63 achieved on July 24, 2017 and a career high ATP doubles ranking of 84 achieved on February 26, 2018. He won one ATP Doubles Title and 11 ATP Challenger Singles Titles. He retired in 2022, playing his last match at the 2022 Rio Open.

He is the brother of Brazilian tennis player Daniel Dutra da Silva.

== ATP career finals ==
=== Doubles: 3 (1 title, 2 runner-ups) ===
Legend Grand Slam tournaments (0–0) ATP World Tour Finals (0–0) ATP World Tour Masters 1000 (0–0) ATP World Tour 500 Series (0–2) ATP World Tour 250 Series (1–0)	Titles by surface Hard (0–0) Clay (1–2) Grass (0–0)	Titles by setting Outdoor (1–2) Indoor (0–0)

Result	W–L	Date	Tournament	Tier	Surface	Partner	Opponents	Score
Loss	0–1	Jul 2012	German Open, Germany	500 Series	Clay	(Spain) Daniel Muñoz de la Nava	(Spain) David Marrero (Spain) Fernando Verdasco	4–6, 3–6
Win	1–1	Mar 2017	Brasil Open, Brazil	250 Series	Clay	(Brazil) André Sá	(New Zealand) Marcus Daniell (Brazil) Marcelo Demoliner	7–6^{(7–5)}, 5–7, [10–7]
Loss	1–2	Feb 2019	Rio Open, Brazil	500 Series	Clay	(Brazil) Thomaz Bellucci	(Argentina) Máximo González (Chile) Nicolás Jarry	7–6^{(7–3)}, 3–6, [7–10]

== Challenger and Futures finals ==
=== Singles: 37 (20–17) ===
Legend (singles) ATP Challenger Tour (11–13) ITF Futures Tour (9–4)	Titles by surface Hard (3–2) Clay (17–14) Grass (0–0)

Result	W–L	Date	Tournament	Tier	Surface	Opponent	Score
Loss	0–1	Sep 2005	Brazil F10, Florianópolis	Futures	Clay	(Brazil) Bruno Rosa	6–2, 3–6, 1–6
Loss	0–2	Apr 2006	Italy F9, Rome	Futures	Clay	(Argentina) Antonio Pastorino	7–5, 5–7, 2–6
Win	1–2	May 2006	Brazil F3, Chapecó	Futures	Clay	(Uruguay) Martín Vilarrubí	6–2, 6–4
Win	2–2	Jun 2006	Brazil F4, Piracicaba	Futures	Clay	(Ecuador) Giovanni Lapentti	6–0, 2–6, 7–6^{(7–2)}
Win	3–2	Jun 2006	Brazil F5, Sorocaba	Futures	Clay	(Colombia) Santiago Giraldo	6–4, 6–1
Win	4–2	May 2008	Brazil F2, Itu	Futures	Clay	(Brazil) André Ghem	7–6^{(7–4)}, 4–6, 6–4
Win	5–2	May 2008	Brazil F3, São Roque	Futures	Clay	(Brazil) André Miele	5–7, 6–2, 6–4
Win	6–2	Jun 2008	Brazil F7, Guarulhos	Futures	Clay	(Brazil) Daniel Silva	6–0, 6–1
Win	7–2	Jun 2008	Brazil F8, Cuiabá	Futures	Clay	(Brazil) Daniel Silva	6–1, 6–7^{(2–7)}, 6–0
Loss	7–3	Nov 2008	Brazil F27, Porto Alegre	Futures	Clay	(Brazil) Júlio Silva	6–7^{(5–7)}, 1–6
Loss	7–4	May 2009	Blumenau, Brazil	Challenger	Clay	(Brazil) Marcelo Demoliner	1–6, 0–6
Loss	7–5	Jul 2010	Brazil F12, Sorocaba	Futures	Clay	(Brazil) Caio Zampieri	2–6, 7–5, 6–7^{(4–7)}
Win	8–5	Jul 2010	Brazil F16, Jundiaí	Futures	Clay	(Brazil) Fernando Romboli	6–3, 7–5
Win	9–5	Aug 2010	Brazil F21, Campo Grande	Futures	Clay	(Brazil) Eládio Ribeiro Neto	6–7^{(9–11)}, 7–5, 4–0 ret.
Win	10–5	Oct 2010	Belo Horizonte, Brazil	Challenger	Hard	(Argentina) Facundo Argüello	6–4, 6–3
Loss	10–6	Apr 2011	Pereira, Colombia	Challenger	Clay	(Italy) Paolo Lorenzi	5–7, 2–6
Win	11–6	Aug 2011	Campos do Jordão, Brazil	Challenger	Hard	(South Africa) Izak van der Merwe	6–4, 6–7^{(5–7)}, 6–3
Loss	11–7	Oct 2011	Recife, Brazil	Challenger	Hard	(Brazil) Ricardo Mello	6–7^{(5–7)}, 3–6
Win	12–7	Jul 2012	Panama City, Panama	Challenger	Clay	(Canada) Peter Polansky	6–3, 6–0
Loss	12–8	Jan 2013	São Paulo, Brazil	Challenger	Hard	(Argentina) Horacio Zeballos	6–7^{(5–7)}, 2–6
Win	13–8	Apr 2013	Itajaí, Brazil	Challenger	Clay	(Slovakia) Jozef Kovalík	4–6, 6–3, 6–1
Loss	13–9	Apr 2013	Santos, Brazil	Challenger	Clay	(Portugal) Gastão Elias	6–4, 2–6, 0–6
Win	14–9	Apr 2014	São Paulo, Brazil	Challenger	Clay	(Slovenia) Blaž Rola	6–4, 6–2
Loss	14–10	Jun 2015	Milan, Italy	Challenger	Clay	(Argentina) Federico Delbonis	1–6, 6–7^{(6–8)}
Win	15–10	Aug 2015	Prague, Czech Republic	Challenger	Clay	(Moldova) Radu Albot	6–2, 6–7^{(5–7)}, 6–4
Loss	15–11	Sep 2015	Barranquilla, Colombia	Challenger	Clay	(Croatia) Borna Ćorić	4–6, 1–6
Win	16–11	Oct 2015	Santiago, Chile	Challenger	Clay	(Argentina) Horacio Zeballos	7–5, 3–6, 7–5
Loss	16–12	Mar 2016	Santiago, Chile	Challenger	Clay	(Argentina) Facundo Bagnis	7–6^{(7–3)}, 4–6, 3–6
Win	17–12	May 2016	Bordeaux, France	Challenger	Clay	(United States) Bjorn Fratangelo	6–3, 6–1
Loss	17–13	Sep 2016	Barranquilla, Colombia	Challenger	Clay	(Argentina) Diego Schwartzman	4–6, 1–6
Loss	17–14	Oct 2016	Santiago, Chile	Challenger	Clay	(Argentina) Máximo González	2–6, 6–7^{(5–7)}
Loss	17–15	Nov 2016	Montevideo, Uruguay	Challenger	Clay	(Argentina) Diego Schwartzman	4–6, 1–6
Win	18–15	Mar 2017	Santiago, Chile	Challenger	Clay	(Chile) Nicolás Jarry	7–5, 6–3
Win	19–15	Apr 2017	Panama City, Panama	Challenger	Clay	(Serbia) Peđa Krstin	6–2, 6–4
Loss	19–16	May 2017	Bordeaux, France	Challenger	Clay	(Belgium) Steve Darcis	6–7^{(2–7)}, 6–4, 5–7
Win	20–16	Jan 2019	Playford, Australia	Challenger	Hard	(Germany) Mats Moraing	6–3, 6–2
Loss	20–17	Aug 2019	Liberec, Czech Republic	Challenger	Clay	(Serbia) Nikola Milojević	3–6, 6–3, 4–6

=== Doubles: 35 (13–22) ===
Legend (doubles) ATP Challenger Tour (4–15) ITF Futures Tour (9–7)	Titles by surface Hard (0–1) Clay (13–21) Grass (0–0) Carpet (0–0)

Result	W–L	Date	Tournament	Tier	Surface	Partner	Opponents	Score
Loss	0–1	May 2004	Colombia F2, Pereira	Futures	Clay	(Brazil) Júlio Silva	(Brazil) Lucas Engel (Brazil) André Ghem	4–6, 3–6
Loss	0–2	Jun 2004	Italy F10, Castelfranco Veneto	Futures	Clay	(Brazil) Júlio Silva	(Italy) Flavio Cipolla (Italy) Alessandro Motti	4–6, 1–6
Win	1–2	Sep 2004	Brazil F5, Curitiba	Futures	Clay	(Brazil) Júlio Silva	(Brazil) Daniel Melo (Brazil) Marcelo Melo	6–2, 6–4
Loss	1–3	Oct 2004	Brazil F10, Campo Grande	Futures	Clay	(Brazil) Júlio Silva	(Brazil) Lucas Engel (Brazil) André Ghem	0–6, 1–6
Loss	1–4	Jan 2005	El Salvador F1, San Salvador	Futures	Clay	(Brazil) Márcio Torres	(Paraguay) Francisco Rodríguez (United States) Scott Schnugg	3–6, 6–3, 2–6
Win	2–4	Mar 2005	Brazil F2, Guarulhos	Futures	Clay	(Brazil) Júlio Silva	(Brazil) Henrique Pinto-Silva (Brazil) Gabriel Pitta	6–2, 6–4
Win	3–4	Mar 2006	Italy F6, Catania	Futures	Clay	(Brazil) Marcelo Melo	(Spain) Héctor Ruiz-Cadenas (Argentina) Agustin Tarantino	6–3, 6–1
Win	4–4	Apr 2006	Italy F7, Monterotondo	Futures	Clay	(Brazil) Marcelo Melo	(Austria) Tobias Köck (Croatia) Ivan Vuković	4–6, 6–4, 6–2
Loss	4–5	Apr 2006	Italy F10, Cremona	Futures	Clay	(Romania) Bogdan-Victor Leonte	(France) Jean-François Bachelot (France) David Guez	4–6, 3–6
Loss	4–6	May 2006	Brazil F1, Recife	Futures	Clay (i)	(Brazil) Alexandre Simoni	(Brazil) Rafael Farias (Brazil) Gabriel Pitta	1–6, 2–6
Loss	4–7	May 2006	Brazil F2, Florianópolis	Futures	Clay	(Brazil) Thomaz Bellucci	(Brazil) Franco Ferreiro (Brazil) Gabriel Pitta	4–6, 4–6
Win	5–7	Jun 2006	Brazil F5, Sorocaba	Futures	Clay	(Brazil) Franco Ferreiro	(Ecuador) Carlos Avellán (Brazil) Thomaz Bellucci	7–6^{(7–3)}, 6–4
Loss	5–8	Jul 2006	Bogotá, Colombia	Challenger	Clay	(Uruguay) Martín Vilarrubí	(Mexico) Daniel Garza (Colombia) Michael Quintero	6–7^{(6–8)}, 4–6
Win	6–8	Oct 2006	Quito, Ecuador	Challenger	Clay	(Brazil) Marcelo Melo	(Uruguay) Pablo Cuevas (Argentina) Horacio Zeballos	6–3, 6–4
Loss	6–9	Sep 2008	Seville, Spain	Challenger	Clay	(Brazil) Flávio Saretta	(Spain) David Marrero (Spain) Pablo Santos González	6–2, 2–6, [8–10]
Win	7–9	Oct 2008	Florianópolis, Brazil	Challenger	Clay	(Brazil) Júlio Silva	(Brazil) Ricardo Hocevar (Brazil) André Miele	3–6, 6–4, [10–4]
Win	8–9	Nov 2008	Brazil F27, Porto Alegre	Futures	Clay	(Brazil) Júlio Silva	(Brazil) Rafael Camilo (Brazil) Rodrigo Guidolin	6–4, 6–3
Win	9–9	Nov 2008	Brazil F28, Guarulhos	Futures	Clay	(Brazil) Júlio Silva	(France) Marc Auradou (France) Philippe Frayssinoux]	3–6, 6–2, [10–6]
Loss	9–10	Mar 2009	Santiago, Chile	Challenger	Clay	(Brazil) Flávio Saretta	(Argentina) Sebastián Prieto (Argentina) Horacio Zeballos	6–7^{(2–7)}, 2–6
Loss	9–11	May 2009	Blumenau, Brazil	Challenger	Clay	(Brazil) Júlio Silva	(Brazil) Marcelo Demoliner (Brazil) Rodrigo Guidolin	5–7, 6–4, [11–13]
Loss	9–12	Aug 2009	Campos do Jordão, Brazil	Challenger	Hard	(Brazil) Júlio Silva	(United Kingdom) Josh Goodall (Australia) Sam Groth	6–7^{(4–7)}, 3–6
Loss	9–13	Sep 2009	Palermo, Italy	Challenger	Clay	(Canada) Pierre-Ludovic Duclos	(Austria) Martin Fischer (Austria) Philipp Oswald	3–6, 6–7^{(4–7)}
Win	10–13	Jul 2010	Brazil F13, Araçatuba	Futures	Clay	(Brazil) Caio Zampieri	(Brazil) Carlos Oliveira (Brazil) Fernando Romboli	7–6^{(9–7)}, 6–4
Win	11–13	Jul 2010	Brazil F16, Jundiaí	Futures	Clay	(Brazil) Júlio Silva	(Brazil) Marcelo Demoliner (Brazil) Rodrigo Guidolin	6–3, 6–2
Win	12–13	Aug 2010	Campos do Jordão, Brazil	Challenger	Clay	(Brazil) Júlio Silva	(Brazil) Vítor Manzini (Brazil) Pedro Zerbini	7–6^{(7–3)}, 6–2
Loss	12–14	Mar 2011	Salinas, Ecuador	Challenger	Clay	(Brazil) João Souza	(Argentina) Facundo Bagnis (Argentina) Federico Delbonis	2–6, 1–6
Loss	12–15	Apr 2012	Santos, Brazil	Challenger	Clay	(Brazil) Júlio Silva	(Argentina) Andrés Molteni (Argentina) Marco Trungelliti	4–6, 3–6
Loss	12–16	Oct 2013	Buenos Aires, Argentina	Challenger	Clay	(Brazil) André Ghem	(Argentina) Máximo González (Argentina) Diego Schwartzman	3–6, 5–7
Loss	12–17	Nov 2013	Montevideo, Uruguay	Challenger	Clay	(Brazil) André Ghem	(Uruguay) Pablo Cuevas (Uruguay) Martín Cuevas	w/o
Loss	12–18	Nov 2015	Lima, Peru	Challenger	Clay	(Brazil) João Souza	(Slovakia) Andrej Martin (Chile) Hans Podlipnik Castillo	3–6, 4–6
Loss	12–19	Apr 2016	Barletta, Italy	Challenger	Clay	(Italy) Flavio Cipolla	(Sweden) Johan Brunström (Sweden) Andreas Siljeström	6–0, 4–6, [8–10]
Win	13–19	Jun 2016	Perugia, Italy	Challenger	Clay	(Argentina) Andrés Molteni	(Colombia) Nicolás Barrientos (Brazil) Fabrício Neis	7–5, 6–3
Loss	13–20	Sep 2016	Santos, Brazil	Challenger	Clay	(Brazil) Fabrício Neis	(Argentina) Máximo González (Peru) Sergio Galdós	3–6, 7–5, [12–14]
Loss	13–21	Jul 2019	Perugia, Italy	Challenger	Clay	(Poland) Szymon Walków	(Bosnia and Herzegovina) Tomislav Brkić (Croatia) Ante Pavić	4–6, 3–6
Loss	13–22	Nov 2020	São Paulo, Brazil	Challenger	Clay	(Brazil) Fernando Romboli	(Venezuela) Luis David Martínez (Brazil) Felipe Meligeni Alves	3–6, 3–6

== Singles performance timeline ==
Key
W	F	SF	QF	#R	RR	Q#	DNQ	A	NH

(W) winner; (F) finalist; (SF) semifinalist; (QF) quarterfinalist; (#R) rounds 4, 3, 2, 1; (RR) round-robin stage; (Q#) qualification round; (DNQ) did not qualify; (A) absent; (NH) not held; (SR) strike rate (events won / competed); (W–L) win–loss record.
To avoid confusion and double counting, these charts are updated at the conclusion of a tournament or when the player's participation has ended.

Tournament	2011	2012	2013	2014	2015	2016	2017	2018	2019	SR	W–L	Win %
Grand Slam tournaments
Australian Open	A	Q3	Q1	A	A	A	2R	1R	Q1	0 / 2	1–2	33%
French Open	A	1R	1R	Q2	A	1R	2R	1R	Q1	0 / 5	1–5	17%
Wimbledon	Q2	Q1	1R	Q2	A	1R	1R	A	Q2	0 / 3	0–3	0%
US Open	2R	2R	2R	Q1	A	1R	1R	Q1	Q1	0 / 5	3–5	38%
Win–loss	1–1	1–2	1–3	0–0	0–0	0–3	2–4	0–2	0–0	0 / 15	5–15	25%
