= Hubert Hurkacz career statistics =

Professional tennis player

This is a list of the main career statistics of Polish professional tennis player Hubert Hurkacz. All statistics are per the ATP World Tour and ITF websites.

Career finals
| Discipline | Type | Won | Lost | Total |
|---|---|---|---|---|
| Singles | Grand Slam | – | – | – |
| Singles | ATP Finals | – | – | – |
| Singles | ATP 1000 | 2 | 1 | 3 |
| Singles | ATP 500 | 1 | 2 | 3 |
| Singles | ATP 250 | 5 | 2 | 7 |
| Singles | Olympics | – | – | – |
| Singles | Total | 8 | 5 | 13 |
| Doubles | Grand Slam | – | – | – |
| Doubles | ATP Finals | – | – | – |
| Doubles | ATP 1000 | 2 | 0 | 2 |
| Doubles | ATP 500 | 0 | 1 | 1 |
| Doubles | ATP 250 | 2 | 0 | 2 |
| Doubles | Olympics | – | – | – |
| Doubles | Total | 4 | 1 | 5 |

== Performance timelines ==
Key
| W | F | SF | QF | #R | RR | Q# | P# | DNQ | A | Z# | PO | G | S | B | NMS | NTI | P | NH |

(W) winner; (F) finalist; (SF) semifinalist; (QF) quarterfinalist; (#R) rounds 4, 3, 2, 1; (RR) round-robin stage; (Q#) qualification round; (P#) preliminary round; (DNQ) did not qualify; (A) absent; (Z#) Davis/Fed Cup Zonal Group (with number indication) or (PO) play-off; (G) gold, (S) silver or (B) bronze Olympic/Paralympic medal; (NMS) not a Masters tournament; (NTI) not a Tier I tournament; (P) postponed; (NH) not held; (SR) strike rate (events won / competed); (W–L) win–loss record.
To avoid confusion and double counting, these charts are updated at the conclusion of a tournament or when the player's participation has ended.

=== Singles ===
Current through the 2026 China Open.

| Tournament | 2015 | 2016 | 2017 | 2018 | 2019 | 2020 | 2021 | 2022 | 2023 | 2024 | 2025 | 2026 | SR | W–L | Win % |
|---|---|---|---|---|---|---|---|---|---|---|---|---|---|---|---|
Grand Slam tournaments
| Australian Open | A | A | A | Q2 | 1R | 2R | 1R | 2R | 4R | QF | 2R | 2R | 0 / 8 | 11–8 | 58% |
| French Open | A | A | A | 2R | 1R | 1R | 1R | 4R | 3R | 4R | 1R | 2R | 0 / 9 | 10–9 | 53% |
| Wimbledon | A | A | A | 1R | 3R | NH | SF | 1R | 4R | 2R | A | 4R | 0 / 7 | 14–7 | 67% |
| US Open | A | A | A | 2R | 1R | 2R | 2R | 2R | 2R | 2R | A | 2R | 0 / 8 | 7–8 | 47% |
| Win–loss | 0–0 | 0–0 | 0–0 | 2–3 | 2–4 | 2–3 | 6–4 | 5–4 | 9–4 | 9–4 | 1–2 | 6–4 | 0 / 32 | 42–32 | 57% |
Year-end championships
| ATP Finals | did not qualify | | | | | | RR | Alt | RR | DNQ | | | 0 / 2 | 0–4 | 0% |
National representation
| Summer Olympics | NH | A | not held | | | | 2R | NH | | A | NH | | 0 / 1 | 1–1 | 50% |
ATP 1000
| Indian Wells Open | A | A | A | A | QF | NH | QF | 4R | 3R | 2R | 3R | 1R | 0 / 7 | 11–7 | 61% |
| Miami Open | A | A | A | A | 3R | NH | W | SF | 3R | 4R | A | 1R | 1 / 6 | 15–5 | 75% |
| Monte-Carlo Masters | A | A | A | A | 1R | NH | 2R | QF | 3R | 3R | A | 3R | 0 / 6 | 10–6 | 63% |
| Madrid Open | A | A | A | A | 3R | NH | 1R | QF | 3R | 4R | 2R | 2R | 0 / 7 | 9–7 | 56% |
| Italian Open | A | A | A | A | Q1 | 3R | 1R | 1R | 2R | QF | QF | 1R | 0 / 7 | 8–7 | 53% |
| Canadian Open | A | A | Q1 | Q1 | 3R | NH | QF | F | 3R | QF | A | 3R | 0 / 6 | 12–6 | 67% |
| Cincinnati Open | A | A | A | 1R | 1R | 1R | 3R | 2R | SF | QF | A | 2R | 0 / 8 | 9–8 | 53% |
| Shanghai Masters | A | A | A | 1R | 3R | NH | | | W | A | A | 4R | 1 / 4 | 11–3 | 80% |
| Paris Masters | A | A | A | A | 1R | 1R | SF | 2R | QF | 1R | A | 1R | 0 / 7 | 7–7 | 50% |
| Win–loss | 0–0 | 0–0 | 0–0 | 0–2 | 12–8 | 2–3 | 16–7 | 17–8 | 20–8 | 13–8 | 4–3 | 9–9 | 2 / 56 | 93–56 | 62% |
Career statistics
| | 2015 | 2016 | 2017 | 2018 | 2019 | 2020 | 2021 | 2022 | 2023 | 2024 | 2025 | 2026 | Career | | |
| Tournaments | 0 | 0 | 0 | 9 | 25 | 13 | 24 | 23 | 24 | 18 | 9 | 18 | 163 | | |
| Titles | 0 | 0 | 0 | 0 | 1 | 0 | 3 | 1 | 2 | 1 | 0 | 0 | 8 | | |
| Finals | 0 | 0 | 0 | 0 | 1 | 0 | 3 | 2 | 3 | 2 | 1 | 1 | 13 | | |
| Overall win–loss | 0–0 | 1–3 | 0–4 | 7–11 | 25–24 | 15–13 | 36–23 | 41–21 | 46–24 | 40–19 | 15–11 | 24–19 | 250–172 | | |
| Win % | – | 25% | 0% | 39% | 51% | 54% | 61% | 66% | 66% | 68% | 58% | 56% | 59% | | |
| Year-end ranking | 620 | 383 | 238 | 86 | 37 | 34 | 9 | 10 | 9 | 16 | 73 | | $21,118,928 | | |

=== Doubles ===
| Tournament | 2019 | 2020 | 2021 | 2022 | 2023 | 2024 | 2025 | 2026 | SR | W–L | Win % |
|---|---|---|---|---|---|---|---|---|---|---|---|
Grand Slam tournaments
| Australian Open | A | 1R | 1R | A | A | A | A | A | 0 / 2 | 0–2 | 0% |
| French Open | 1R | 2R | 1R | A | A | A | A | A | 0 / 3 | 1–3 | 25% |
| Wimbledon | A | NH | A | A | A | A | A | | 0 / 0 | 0–0 | – |
| US Open | 1R | A | 2R | A | A | A | A | | 0 / 2 | 1–2 | 33% |
| Win–loss | 0–2 | 1–2 | 1–3 | 0–0 | 0–0 | 0–0 | 0–0 | 0–0 | 0 / 7 | 2–7 | 22% |
National representation
| Summer Olympics | not held | | A | not held | | A | NH | | 0 / 0 | 0–0 | – |
| Davis Cup | A | A | A | A | A | A | A | | 0 / 0 | 0–0 | – |
ATP 1000
| Indian Wells Open | A | NH | 1R | 1R | 2R | 1R | A | A | 0 / 4 | 1–3 | 25% |
| Miami Open | A | NH | 2R | W | A | A | A | A | 1 / 2 | 6–1 | 86% |
| Monte-Carlo Masters | A | NH | 2R | 1R | 1R | A | A | A | 0 / 3 | 1–3 | 25% |
| Madrid Open | A | NH | 1R | SF | 1R | A | A | A | 0 / 3 | 3–3 | 50% |
| Italian Open | A | A | A | 2R | 1R | 1R | A | A | 0 / 3 | 1–3 | 25% |
| Canadian Open | 1R | NH | 1R | SF | QF | A | A | | 0 / 4 | 5–4 | 63% |
| Cincinnati Open | 1R | 2R | QF | 1R | 2R | A | A | | 0 / 5 | 4–5 | 44% |
| Shanghai Masters | 2R | NH | | | 1R | A | A | | 0 / 2 | 1–2 | 33% |
| Paris Masters | 2R | W | A | A | A | A | A | | 1 / 2 | 6–1 | 86% |
| Win–loss | 2–4 | 6–1 | 4–6 | 12–6 | 4–6 | 0–2 | 0–0 | 0–0 | 2 / 28 | 28–25 | 53% |
Career statistics
| | 2019 | 2020 | 2021 | 2022 | 2023 | 2024 | 2025 | 2026 | Career | | |
| Tournaments | 10 | 8 | 18 | 14 | 10 | 3 | 1 | 1 | 65 | | |
| Titles | 0 | 1 | 1 | 2 | 0 | 0 | 0 | 0 | 4 | | |
| Finals | 0 | 1 | 2 | 2 | 0 | 0 | 0 | 0 | 5 | | |
| Overall win–loss | 2–10 | 8–10 | 17–16 | 21–12 | 5–11 | 2–3 | 0–1 | 0–1 | 4 / 65 | 55–64 | 46% |
| Win % | 17% | 44% | 52% | 64% | 31% | 40% | 0% | 0% | 46% | | |
| Year-end ranking | 437 | 253 | 72 | 81 | 35 | 195 | – | | | | |

== ATP 1000 tournaments finals ==
=== Singles: 3 (2 titles, 1 runner-up) ===
| Result | Year | Tournament | Surface | Opponent | Score |
|---|---|---|---|---|---|
| Win | 2021 | Miami Open | Hard | (Italy) Jannik Sinner | 7–6^{(7–4)}, 6–4 |
| Loss | 2022 | Canadian Open | Hard | (Spain) Pablo Carreño Busta | 6–3, 3–6, 3–6 |
| Win | 2023 | Shanghai Masters | Hard | Andrey Rublev | 6–3, 3–6, 7–6^{(10–8)} |

==== Doubles: 2 (2 titles) ====
| Result | Year | Tournament | Surface | Partner | Opponents | Score |
|---|---|---|---|---|---|---|
| Win | 2020 | Paris Masters | Hard (i) | (Canada) Félix Auger-Aliassime | (Croatia) Mate Pavić (Brazil) Bruno Soares | 6–7^{(3–7)}, 7–6^{(9–7)}, [10–2] |
| Win | 2022 | Miami Open | Hard | (United States) John Isner | (Netherlands) Wesley Koolhof (United Kingdom) Neal Skupski | 7–6^{(7–5)}, 6–4 |

== ATP Tour finals ==
=== Singles: 13 (8 titles, 5 runner-ups) ===
| Legend Grand Slam (–) ATP 1000 (2–1) ATP 500 (1–2) ATP 250 (5–2) | Finals by surface Hard (6–3) Clay (1–1) Grass (1–1) | Finals by setting Outdoor (6–4) Indoor (2–1) |

| Result | W–L | Date | Tournament | Tier | Surface | Opponent | Score |
|---|---|---|---|---|---|---|---|
| Win | 1–0 | Aug 2019 | Winston-Salem Open, US | ATP 250 | Hard | (France) Benoît Paire | 6–3, 3–6, 6–3 |
| Win | 2–0 | Jan 2021 | Delray Beach Open, US | ATP 250 | Hard | (United States) Sebastian Korda | 6–3, 6–3 |
| Win | 3–0 | Apr 2021 | Miami Open, US | ATP 1000 | Hard | (Italy) Jannik Sinner | 7–6^{(7–4)}, 6–4 |
| Win | 4–0 | Sep 2021 | Moselle Open, France | ATP 250 | Hard (i) | (Spain) Pablo Carreño Busta | 7–6^{(7–2)}, 6–3 |
| Win | 5–0 | Jun 2022 | Halle Open, Germany | ATP 500 | Grass | Daniil Medvedev | 6–1, 6–4 |
| Loss | 5–1 | Aug 2022 | Canadian Open, Canada | ATP 1000 | Hard | (Spain) Pablo Carreño Busta | 6–3, 3–6, 3–6 |
| Win | 6–1 | Feb 2023 | Open 13, France | ATP 250 | Hard (i) | (France) Benjamin Bonzi | 6–3, 7–6^{(7–4)} |
| Win | 7–1 | Oct 2023 | Shanghai Masters, China | ATP 1000 | Hard | Andrey Rublev | 6–3, 3–6, 7–6^{(10–8)} |
| Loss | 7–2 | Oct 2023 | Swiss Indoors, Switzerland | ATP 500 | Hard (i) | (Canada) Félix Auger-Aliassime | 6–7^{(3–7)}, 6–7^{(5–7)} |
| Win | 8–2 | Apr 2024 | Estoril Open, Portugal | ATP 250 | Clay | (Spain) Pedro Martínez | 6–3, 6–4 |
| Loss | 8–3 | Jun 2024 | Halle Open, Germany | ATP 500 | Grass | (Italy) Jannik Sinner | 6–7^{(8–10)}, 6–7^{(2–7)} |
| Loss | 8–4 | May 2025 | Geneva Open, Switzerland | ATP 250 | Clay | (Serbia) Novak Djokovic | 7–5, 6–7^{(2–7)}, 6–7^{(2–7)} |
| Loss | 8–5 | Sep 2026 | Chengdu Open, China | ATP 250 | Hard | (Spain) Alejandro Davidovich Fokina | 4–6, 6–7^{(7–9)} |

=== Doubles: 5 (4 titles, 1 runner-up) ===
| Legend Grand Slam (–) ATP 1000 (2–0) ATP 500 (0–1) ATP 250 (2–0) | Finals by surface Hard (3–0) Clay (–) Grass (1–1) | Finals by setting Outdoor (2–1) Indoor (2–0) |

| Result | W–L | Date | Tournament | Tier | Surface | Partner | Opponents | Score |
|---|---|---|---|---|---|---|---|---|
| Win | 1–0 | Nov 2020 | Paris Masters, France | ATP 1000 | Hard (i) | (Canada) Félix Auger-Aliassime | (Croatia) Mate Pavić (Brazil) Bruno Soares | 6–7^{(3–7)}, 7–6^{(9–7)}, [10–2] |
| Loss | 1–1 | Jun 2021 | Halle Open, Germany | ATP 500 | Grass | (Canada) Félix Auger-Aliassime | (Germany) Kevin Krawietz (Romania) Horia Tecău | 6–7^{(4–7)}, 4–6 |
| Win | 2–1 | Sep 2021 | Moselle Open, France | ATP 250 | Hard (i) | (Poland) Jan Zieliński | (Monaco) Hugo Nys (France) Arthur Rinderknech | 7–5, 6–3 |
| Win | 3–1 | Apr 2022 | Miami Open, US | ATP 1000 | Hard | (United States) John Isner | (Netherlands) Wesley Koolhof (United Kingdom) Neal Skupski | 7–6^{(7–5)}, 6–4 |
| Win | 4–1 | Jun 2022 | Stuttgart Open, Germany | ATP 250 | Grass | (Croatia) Mate Pavić | (Germany) Tim Pütz (New Zealand) Michael Venus | 7–6^{(7–3)}, 7–6^{(7–5)} |

== ATP Challenger and ITF Tour finals ==
=== Singles: 11 (6 titles, 5 runner-ups) ===
| Legend ATP Challenger (4–3) ITF Futures (2–2) | Finals by surface Hard (4–2) Clay (2–3) |

| Result | W–L | Date | Tournament | Tier | Surface | Opponent | Score |
|---|---|---|---|---|---|---|---|
| Loss | 0–1 | Nov 2017 | Shenzhen Longhua Open, China | Challenger | Hard | (Moldova) Radu Albot | 6–7^{(6–8)}, 7–6^{(7–3)}, 4–6 |
| Loss | 0–2 | Mar 2018 | Zhuhai Open, China | Challenger | Hard | (Australia) Alex Bolt | 7–5, 6–7^{(4–7)}, 2–6 |
| Win | 1–2 | Jun 2018 | Poznań Open, Poland | Challenger | Clay | (Japan) Taro Daniel | 6–1, 6–1 |
| Win | 2–2 | Oct 2018 | Brest Challenger, France | Challenger | Hard (i) | (Lithuania) Ričardas Berankis | 7–5, 6–1 |
| Win | 3–2 | Jan 2019 | Canberra Challenger, Australia | Challenger | Hard | (Belarus) Ilya Ivashka | 6–4, 4–6, 6–2 |
| Loss | 3–3 | May 2026 | Sardegna Open, Italy | Challenger | Clay | (Italy) Matteo Arnaldi | 4–6, 4–6 |
| Win | 4–3 | Aug 2026 | Cancún Country Open, Mexico | Challenger | Hard | (Argentina) Sebastián Báez | 4–6, 6–0, 6–3 |
| Win | 1–0 | Sep 2015 | F5 Ślęza, Poland | Futures | Clay | (Czech Republic) Robin Staněk | 6–4, 7–6^{(7–4)} |
| Loss | 1–1 | Oct 2015 | F12 Oliveira de Azeméis, Portugal | Futures | Clay | (Spain) Pablo Vivero González | 6–3, 5–7, 3–6 |
| Loss | 1–2 | May 2016 | F3 Jablonec nad Nisou, Czech Republic | Futures | Clay | (Czech Republic) Marek Michalička | 6–3, 4–6, 6–7^{(5–7)} |
| Win | 2–2 | Apr 2017 | F4 Lisbon, Portugal | Futures | Hard | (Portugal) João Domingues | 7–5, 6–1 |

=== Doubles: 7 (3 titles, 4 runner-ups) ===
| Legend ATP Challenger (–) ITF Futures (3–4) | Finals by surface Hard (2–0) Clay (1–3) Carpet (0–1) |

| Result | W–L | Date | Tournament | Tier | Surface | Partner | Opponents | Score |
|---|---|---|---|---|---|---|---|---|
| Loss | 0–1 | Sep 2015 | F4 Bytom, Poland | Futures | Clay | (Poland) Szymon Walków | (Czech Republic) Jan Kunčík (Czech Republic) Petr Michnev | 7–5, 5–7, [8–10] |
| Loss | 0–2 | Jan 2016 | F2 Kaarst, Germany | Futures | Carpet (i) | (Kazakhstan) Alexander Bublik | (Ukraine) Danylo Kalenichenko (Germany) Denis Kapric | 7–6^{(7–2)}, 4–6, [7–10] |
| Loss | 0–3 | May 2016 | F3 Jablonec nad Nisou, Czech Republic | Futures | Clay | (Poland) Szymon Walków | (Germany) Jan Choinski (Germany) Tom Schönenberg | 2–6, 6–7^{(7–9)} |
| Win | 1–3 | Nov 2016 | F17 Leimen, Germany | Futures | Hard (i) | (Poland) Aleksander Charpantidis | (Germany) Marvin Möller (Germany) Tim Rühl | 6–1, 6–3 |
| Win | 2–3 | Apr 2017 | F3 Doha, Qatar | Futures | Hard | (Sweden) Milos Sekulic | (United States) Anderson Reed (Netherlands) Sem Verbeek | 1–6, 3–3 ret. |
| Win | 3–3 | Aug 2017 | F9 Bydgoszcz, Poland | Futures | Clay | (Poland) Michał Dembek | (Poland) Karol Drzewiecki (Poland) Maciej Smoła | 6–2, 6–7^{(9–11)}, [10–6] |
| Loss | 3–4 | Aug 2017 | F10 Poznań, Poland | Futures | Clay | (Poland) Michał Dembek | (Ukraine) Artem Smirnov (Ukraine) Volodymyr Uzhylovskyi | 4–6, 2–6 |

== Junior Grand Slam finals ==
=== Doubles: 1 (runner–up) ===
| Result | Year | Tournament | Surface | Partner | Opponent | Score |
|---|---|---|---|---|---|---|
| Loss | 2015 | Australian Open | Hard | (Slovakia) Alex Molčan | (Australia) Jake Delaney (Australia) Marc Polmans | 6–0, 2–6, [8–10] |

== Grand Slam seedings ==
| Legend seeded No. 4–10 (0 / 9) seeded No. 11–32 (0 / 12) unseeded (0 / 11) | Longest streak 4 6 11 |

| Year | Australian Open | French Open | Wimbledon | US Open |
|---|---|---|---|---|
| 2018 | Did not qualify | Qualifier | Lucky Loser | Qualifier |
| 2019 | Unseeded | Unseeded | Unseeded | Unseeded |
| 2020 | 31st | 29th | tournament cancelled (Note: Due to the COVID-19 pandemic, the 2020 edition of the Wimbledon Championships was cancelled.) | 24th |
| 2021 | 26th | 19th | 14th | 10th |
| 2022 | 10th | 12th | 7th | 8th |
| 2023 | 10th | 13th | 17th | 17th |
| 2024 | 9th | 8th | 7th | 7th |
| 2025 | 18th | 30th | Did not play | Did not play |
| 2026 | Unseeded | Unseeded | Unseeded | Unseeded |

== Wins over top 10 players ==
Hurkacz has a 22–42 record against players who were, at the time the match was played, ranked in the top 10.

| Year | 2019 | 2020 | 2021 | 2022 | 2023 | 2024 | 2025 | 2026 | Total |
|---|---|---|---|---|---|---|---|---|---|
| Wins | 4 | 1 | 4 | 5 | 2 | 1 | 2 | 3 | 22 |

| # | Player | Rk | Event | Surface | Rd | Score | Rk | Ref |
|---|---|---|---|---|---|---|---|---|
2019
| 1. | (Japan) Kei Nishikori | 6 | Dubai Championships, UAE | Hard | 2R | 7–5, 5–7, 6–2 | 77 | |
| 2. | (Japan) Kei Nishikori | 7 | Indian Wells Open, United States | Hard | 3R | 4–6, 6–4, 6–3 | 67 | |
| 3. | (Austria) Dominic Thiem | 4 | Miami Open, United States | Hard | 2R | 6–4, 6–4 | 54 | |
| 4. | (Greece) Stefanos Tsitsipas | 5 | Canadian Open, Canada | Hard | 2R | 6–4, 3–6, 6–3 | 48 | |
2020
| 5. | (Austria) Dominic Thiem | 4 | ATP Cup, Australia | Hard | GS | 3–6, 6–4, 7–6^{(7–5)} | 37 | |
2021
| 6. | (Greece) Stefanos Tsitsipas | 5 | Miami Open, United States | Hard | QF | 2–6, 6–3, 6–4 | 37 | |
| 7. | (Russia) Andrey Rublev | 8 | Miami Open, United States | Hard | SF | 6–3, 6–4 | 37 | |
| 8. | (Russia) Daniil Medvedev | 2 | Wimbledon, United Kingdom | Grass | 4R | 2–6, 7–6^{(7–2)}, 3–6, 6–3, 6–3 | 18 | |
| 9. | (Switzerland) Roger Federer | 8 | Wimbledon, United Kingdom | Grass | QF | 6–3, 7–6^{(7–4)}, 6–0 | 18 | |
2022
| 10. | (Italy) Jannik Sinner | 10 | Dubai Championships, UAE | Hard | QF | 6–3, 6–3 | 11 | |
| 11. | Daniil Medvedev | 2 | Miami Open, United States | Hard | QF | 7–6^{(9–7)}, 6–3 | 10 | |
| 12. | (Canada) Félix Auger-Aliassime | 9 | Halle Open, Germany | Grass | QF | 7–6^{(7–2)}, 7–6^{(7–4)} | 12 | |
| 13. | Daniil Medvedev | 1 | Halle Open, Germany | Grass | F | 6–1, 6–4 | 12 | |
| 14. | (Norway) Casper Ruud | 7 | Canadian Open, Canada | Hard | SF | 5–7, 6–3, 6–2 | 10 | |
2023
| 15. | (Greece) Stefanos Tsitsipas | 4 | Cincinnati Open, United States | Hard | 3R | 6–3, 6–4 | 20 | |
| 16. | Andrey Rublev | 7 | Shanghai Masters, China | Hard | F | 6–3, 3–6, 7–6^{(10–8)} | 16 | |
2024
| 17. | (Germany) Alexander Zverev | 4 | Halle Open, Germany | Grass | SF | 7–6^{(7–2)}, 6–4 | 9 | |
2025
| 18. | Andrey Rublev | 10 | Rotterdam Open, Netherlands | Hard (i) | QF | 6–7^{(5–7)}, 6–3, 6–4 | 21 | |
| 19. | (United States) Taylor Fritz | 4 | Geneva Open, Switzerland | Clay | QF | 6–3, 7–6^{(7–5)} | 31 | |
2026
| 20. | (Germany) Alexander Zverev | 3 | United Cup, Australia | Hard | RR | 6–3, 6–4 | 83 | |
| 21. | (United States) Taylor Fritz | 9 | United Cup, Australia | Hard | SF | 7–6^{(7–1)}, 7–6^{(7–2)} | 83 | |
| 22. | (Serbia) Novak Djokovic | 8 | Shanghai Masters, China | Hard | 2R | 6–4, 6–3 | 34 | |

- Key: (Rk) first use, opponent rank; (Rd) round; (Rk) 2nd use, player rank; (Ref) reference; (F) final; (SF) semifinal; (QF) quarterfinal; (#R) rounds 4, 3, 2, 1; (RR) round-robin stage; (Q#) qualifying rounds or stages (3), 2, 1.

statistics correct as of 9 October 2026

== See also ==
- Poland Davis Cup team
