= 2022 Grand Prix Hassan II – Singles =

Singles
- 2022 Grand Prix Hassan II

Final
- Champion: (Belgium) David Goffin
- Runner-up: (Slovakia) Alex Molčan
- Score: 3–6, 6–3, 6–3

Details
- Draw: 32 (4 Q / 3 WC )
- Seeds: 8

Events
| Singles | Doubles |
- Grand Prix Hassan II

David Goffin defeated Alex Molčan in the final, 3–6, 6–3, 6–3 to win the singles tennis title at the 2022 Grand Prix Hassan II. It was Goffin's sixth ATP singles title.

Benoît Paire was the defending champion from when the event was last held in 2019, but withdrew before the beginning of the tournament.

== Seeds ==
1. (Canada) Félix Auger-Aliassime (second round)
2. (United Kingdom) Dan Evans (first round)
3. (Italy) Fabio Fognini (withdrew)
4. (Spain) Albert Ramos Viñolas (first round)
5. (Argentina) Federico Delbonis (first round)
6. (Netherlands) Botic van de Zandschulp (quarterfinals)
7. (Spain) Alejandro Davidovich Fokina (first round)
8. (Serbia) Laslo Đere (semifinals)
9. (Netherlands) Tallon Griekspoor (first round)

== Draw ==
Key

- Q = Qualifier
- WC = Wild card
- LL = Lucky loser
- Alt = Alternate
- ITF = ITF entry
- PR = Protected ranking
- SR = Special ranking
- SE = Special exempt
- JE = Junior exempt
- JR = Junior Accelerator Programme entrant
- CO = College Accelerator Programme entrant
- NG = Next Gen Accelerator Program entrant
- w/o = Walkover
- r = Retired
- d = Defaulted

=== Finals ===
Semifinals
(Slovakia) Alex Molčan | 6 | 7
8 | (Serbia) Laslo Đere | 1 | 5
(Argentina) Federico Coria | 3 | 3
(Belgium) David Goffin | 6 | 6

Final
(Slovakia) Alex Molčan | 6 | 3 | 3
(Belgium) David Goffin | 3 | 6 | 6

=== Top half ===
First round
1/WC | (Canada) F Auger-Aliassime | 6 | 6
WC | (Morocco) E Benchetrit | 3 | 3
(Slovakia) A Molčan | 6 | 6
Alt | (Italy) S Travaglia | 0 | 4
LL | (Spain) B Zapata Miralles | 1 | 4
Q | (Czech Republic) V Kopřiva | 6 | 6
(Bolivia) H Dellien | 3 | 6 | 4
6 | (Netherlands) B van de Zandschulp | 6 | 3 | 6
4 | (Spain) A Ramos Viñolas | 6^{5} | 1
(Italy) L Musetti | 7^{7} | 6
(Spain) C Taberner | 6 | 1
(Germany) Y Hanfmann | 2 | 0^{r}
(Czech Republic) J Veselý | 7^{8} | 3 | 0^{r}
WC | (Tunisia) M Jaziri | 6^{6} | 6 | 2
(Czech Republic) J Lehečka | 4 | 4
8 | (Serbia) L Đere | 6 | 6

Second round
1/WC | (Canada) F Auger-Aliassime | 4 | 6 | 6^{7}
(Slovakia) A Molčan | 6 | 2 | 7^{9}
Q | (Czech Republic) V Kopřiva | 2 | 4
6 | (Netherlands) B van de Zandschulp | 6 | 6
(Italy) L Musetti | 6 | 6^{3} | 6
(Spain) C Taberner | 1 | 7^{7} | 3
WC | (Tunisia) M Jaziri | 4 | 2
8 | (Serbia) L Đere | 6 | 6

Quarterfinals
(Slovakia) A Molčan | 4 | 6 | 6
6 | (Netherlands) B van de Zandschulp | 6 | 3 | 4
(Italy) L Musetti | 3 | 2
8 | (Serbia) L Đere | 6 | 6

Semifinals
(Slovakia) A Molčan | 6 | 7
8 | (Serbia) L Đere | 1 | 5

=== Bottom half ===
First round
7 | (Spain) A Davidovich Fokina | 5 | 6 | 4
(Argentina) F Coria | 7 | 3 | 6
(Poland) K Majchrzak | 6 | 4 | 1
Q | (Bosnia and Herzegovina) M Bašić | 4 | 6 | 6
(Switzerland) H Laaksonen | 5 | 6 | 4
(France) R Gasquet | 7 | 4 | 6
Q | P Kotov | 0 | 6 | 6
9 | (Netherlands) T Griekspoor | 6 | 2 | 2
5 | (Argentina) F Delbonis | 2 | 7 | 3
(Portugal) J Sousa | 6 | 5 | 6
(Italy) M Cecchinato | 5 | 6^{1}
(Spain) R Carballés Baena | 7 | 7^{7}
(Belgium) D Goffin | 6 | 7^{7}
Q | (Bosnia and Herzegovina) D Džumhur | 2 | 6^{3}
(Spain) P Andújar | 6 | 6
2 | (United Kingdom) D Evans | 4 | 2

Second round
(Argentina) F Coria | 6 | 6
Q | (Bosnia and Herzegovina) M Bašić | 4 | 2
(France) R Gasquet | 6 | 3 | 6
Q | P Kotov | 3 | 6 | 3
(Portugal) J Sousa | 2 | 6^{4}
(Spain) R Carballés Baena | 6 | 7^{7}
(Belgium) D Goffin | 5 | 7^{7} | 6
(Spain) P Andújar | 7 | 6^{4} | 3

Quarterfinals
(Argentina) F Coria | 6^{1} | 6 | 6
(France) R Gasquet | 7^{7} | 1 | 4
(Spain) R Carballés Baena | 7^{8} | 4 | 0
(Belgium) D Goffin | 6^{6} | 6 | 6

Semifinals
(Argentina) F Coria | 3 | 3
(Belgium) D Goffin | 6 | 6

== Qualifying ==
=== Seeds ===
1. (Sweden) Mikael Ymer (first round)
2. (Spain) Fernando Verdasco (qualifying competition)
3. (Spain) Bernabé Zapata Miralles (qualifying competition, lucky loser)
4. (Bosnia and Herzegovina) Damir Džumhur (qualified)
5. (Czech Republic) Vít Kopřiva (qualified)
6. Pavel Kotov (qualified)
7. (Italy) Gian Marco Moroni (qualifying competition)
8. (Slovakia) Filip Horanský (first round)

=== Qualifiers ===
1. (Bosnia and Herzegovina) Mirza Bašić
2. Pavel Kotov
3. (Czech Republic) Vít Kopřiva
4. (Bosnia and Herzegovina) Damir Džumhur

=== Lucky loser ===
1. (Spain) Bernabé Zapata Miralles

=== Qualifying draw ===
==== First qualifier ====
First round
1 | (Sweden) Mikael Ymer | 5 | 7 | 6^{5}
(Bosnia and Herzegovina) Mirza Bašić | 7 | 5 | 7^{7}
(Spain) Eduard Esteve Lobato | 6^{2} | 2
7 | (Italy) Gian Marco Moroni | 7^{7} | 6

Qualifying competition
(Bosnia and Herzegovina) Mirza Bašić | 6 | 6
7 | (Italy) Gian Marco Moroni | 4 | 4

==== Second qualifier ====
First round
2 | (Spain) Fernando Verdasco | 6 | 6
Alt | (Kazakhstan) Aleksandr Nedovyesov | 4 | 2
Alt | (Brazil) Rafael Matos | 4 | 1
6 | Pavel Kotov | 6 | 6

Qualifying competition
2 | (Spain) Fernando Verdasco | 5 | 3
6 | Pavel Kotov | 7 | 6

==== Third qualifier ====
First round
3 | (Spain) Bernabé Zapata Miralles | 6 | 6
WC | (Morocco) Mehdi Benchakroun | 2 | 4
(Italy) Matteo Viola | 4 | 3
5 | (Czech Republic) Vít Kopřiva | 6 | 6

Qualifying competition
3 | (Spain) Bernabé Zapata Miralles | 6 | 1 | 5
5 | (Czech Republic) Vít Kopřiva | 0 | 6 | 7

==== Fourth qualifier ====
First round
4 | (Bosnia and Herzegovina) Damir Džumhur | 6 | 6
WC | (Morocco) Lamine Ouahab | 3 | 4
(Italy) Andrea Vavassori | 6 | 6
8 | (Slovakia) Filip Horanský | 3 | 0

Qualifying competition
4 | (Bosnia and Herzegovina) Damir Džumhur | 4 | 7 | 6
(Italy) Andrea Vavassori | 6 | 5 | 4
