= 2025 Cancún Country Open – Singles =

Singles
- 2025 Cancún Country Open

Final
- Champion: (Czech Republic) Dalibor Svrčina
- Runner-up: (Argentina) Thiago Agustín Tirante
- Score: 6–4, 5–7, 6–4

Events
Singles	Doubles
- Cancún Country Open

This was the first edition of the tournament.

Dalibor Svrčina won the title after defeating Thiago Agustín Tirante 6–4, 5–7, 6–4 in the final.

== Seeds ==
The top four seeds received a bye into the second round.

1. (Germany) Daniel Altmaier (quarterfinals)
2. (France) Arthur Cazaux (quarterfinals)
3. (Netherlands) Jesper de Jong (quarterfinals)
4. (Argentina) Juan Manuel Cerúndolo (quarterfinals)
5. (Australia) Tristan Schoolkate (first round)
6. (Chile) Alejandro Tabilo (second round)
7. (Canada) Liam Draxl (withdrew)
8. (Czech Republic) Dalibor Svrčina (champion)

== Draw ==
Key

- Q = Qualifier
- WC = Wild card
- LL = Lucky loser
- Alt = Alternate
- ITF = ITF entry
- PR = Protected ranking
- SR = Special ranking
- SE = Special exempt
- JE = Junior exempt
- JR = Junior Accelerator Programme entrant
- CO = College Accelerator Programme entrant
- NG = Next Gen Accelerator Program entrant
- w/o = Walkover
- r = Retired
- d = Defaulted

=== Finals ===
Semifinals
Alt	(Peru) Ignacio Buse	1	1
8	(Czech Republic) Dalibor Svrčina	6	6
WC	(Switzerland) Stan Wawrinka	3	3
Alt	(Argentina) Thiago Agustín Tirante	6	6

Final
8	(Czech Republic) Dalibor Svrčina	6	5	6
Alt	(Argentina) Thiago Agustín Tirante	4	7	4

=== Top half ===
First round
Alt	(Germany) Y Hanfmann	3	7	6
Alt	(Germany) J-L Struff	6	5	1
(Colombia) DE Galán	6^{8}	4
Alt	(Peru) I Buse	7^{10}	6
Q	(Kazakhstan) B Zhukayev	6	7^{9}
5	(Australia) T Schoolkate	4	6^{7}
Alt	(Argentina) M Trungelliti	4	6^{3}
NG	(Mexico) R Pacheco Méndez	6	7^{7}
(France) H Gaston	3	4
Q	(Canada) A Galarneau	6	6
WC	(Mexico) A Hernández	1	3
8	(Czech Republic) D Svrčina	6	6

Second round
1/WC	(Germany) D Altmaier	6	3	6
Alt	(Germany) Y Hanfmann	1	6	1
Alt	(Peru) I Buse	6	7^{7}
Q	(Kazakhstan) B Zhukayev	3	6^{4}
3	(Netherlands) J de Jong	6	6
NG	(Mexico) R Pacheco Méndez	1	2
Q	(Canada) A Galarneau	1	1
8	(Czech Republic) D Svrčina	6	6

Quarterfinals
1/WC	(Germany) D Altmaier	6	2	3
Alt	(Peru) I Buse	3	6	6
3	(Netherlands) J de Jong	5	2
8	(Czech Republic) D Svrčina	7	6

Semifinals
Alt	(Peru) I Buse	1	1
8	(Czech Republic) D Svrčina	6	6

=== Bottom half ===
First round
LL	(Spain) P Llamas Ruiz	4	2^{r}
Q	(Japan) R Noguchi	6	4
WC	(Switzerland) S Wawrinka	6	6
Q	(Canada) C Harper	3	4
(Serbia) D Lajović	3^{r}
(Argentina) RA Burruchaga	5
6	(Chile) A Tabilo	6	6
(Italy) F Passaro	1	4
(Italy) M Gigante	1	2^{r}
Alt	(Argentina) TA Tirante	6	4
(Italy) A Pellegrino	1	4
Alt	(Hong Kong) C Wong	6	6

Second round
Q	(Japan) R Noguchi	3	4
WC	(Switzerland) S Wawrinka	6	6
(Argentina) RA Burruchaga	6	6^{2}	3
4	(Argentina) JM Cerúndolo	2	7^{7}	6
6	(Chile) A Tabilo	2	4
Alt	(Argentina) TA Tirante	6	6
Alt	(Hong Kong) C Wong	6^{1}	2
2	(France) A Cazaux	7^{7}	6

Quarterfinals
WC	(Switzerland) S Wawrinka	6	6
4	(Argentina) JM Cerúndolo	4	3
Alt	(Argentina) TA Tirante	6	6
2	(France) A Cazaux	4	2

Semifinals
WC	(Switzerland) S Wawrinka	3	3
Alt	(Argentina) TA Tirante	6	6
