= 2025 Cancún Country Open – Doubles =

Doubles
- 2025 Cancún Country Open

Final
- Champions: (Mexico) Santiago González (Netherlands) Jean-Julien Rojer
- Runners-up: (France) Manuel Guinard (Brazil) Rafael Matos
- Score: 7–6^{(7–2)}, 7–5

Events
Singles	Doubles
- Cancún Country Open

This was the first edition of the tournament.

Santiago González and Jean-Julien Rojer won the title after defeating Manuel Guinard and Rafael Matos 7–6^{(7–2)}, 7–5 in the final.

== Seeds ==
1. (France) Manuel Guinard / (Brazil) Rafael Matos (final)
2. (Mexico) Santiago González / (Netherlands) Jean-Julien Rojer (champions)
3. (Colombia) Nicolás Barrientos / (Belgium) Joran Vliegen (quarterfinals)
4. (Germany) Constantin Frantzen / (Netherlands) Robin Haase (quarterfinals)

== Draw ==
Key

- Q = Qualifier
- WC = Wild card
- LL = Lucky loser
- Alt = Alternate
- ITF = ITF entry
- PR = Protected ranking
- SR = Special ranking
- SE = Special exempt
- JE = Junior exempt
- JR = Junior Accelerator Programme entrant
- CO = College Accelerator Programme entrant
- NG = Next Gen Accelerator Program entrant
- w/o = Walkover
- r = Retired
- d = Defaulted

=== Draw ===
First round
(Canada) L Draxl (Canada) C Harper
WC	(Mexico) A Magadán (Mexico) Daniel Moreno	w/o
4	(Germany) C Frantzen (Netherlands) R Haase	w/o
(Peru) I Buse (Argentina) M Trungelliti
(Ecuador) G Escobar (Ecuador) D Hidalgo	7^{7}	6
(United States) G Goldhoff (Chinese Taipei) R Ho	6^{3}	3
(New Zealand) F Reynolds (New Zealand) J Watt	w/o
(Italy) M Gigante (Italy) A Pellegrino
(Netherlands) J de Jong (Czech Republic) D Svrčina	4^{r}
3	(Colombia) N Barrientos (Belgium) J Vliegen	5
WC	(Mexico) LC Álvarez (Mexico) A Hernández	3	4
(Australia) B Bayldon (Mexico) M Reyes-Varela	6	6

Quarterfinals
1	(France) M Guinard (Brazil) R Matos	6	7^{7}
WC	(Mexico) A Magadán (Mexico) D Moreno	1	6^{4}
4	(Germany) C Frantzen (Netherlands) R Haase	7	3	[7]
(Ecuador) G Escobar (Ecuador) D Hidalgo	5	6	[10]
(New Zealand) F Reynolds (New Zealand) J Watt	7	6
3	(Colombia) N Barrientos (Belgium) J Vliegen	5	3
(Australia) B Bayldon (Mexico) M Reyes-Varela	2	6^{2}
2	(Mexico) S González (Netherlands) J-J Rojer	6	7^{7}

Semifinals
1	(France) M Guinard (Brazil) R Matos	6	6
(Ecuador) G Escobar (Ecuador) D Hidalgo	4	1
(New Zealand) F Reynolds (New Zealand) J Watt	4	5
2	(Mexico) S González (Netherlands) J-J Rojer	6	7

Final
1	(France) M Guinard (Brazil) R Matos	6^{2}	5
2	(Mexico) S González (Netherlands) J-J Rojer	7^{7}	7
