= 2026 Cancún Country Open – Doubles =

Doubles
- 2026 Cancún Country Open

Final
- Champions: (India) Sriram Balaji (India) Anirudh Chandrasekar
- Runners-up: Ivan Liutarevich (Mexico) Miguel Ángel Reyes-Varela
- Score: 6–3, 7–6^{(7–4)}

Events
Singles	Doubles
- Cancún Country Open

During the doubles championship of the 2026 Cancún Country Open, Santiago González and Jean-Julien Rojer were the defending champions but chose to defend their title with different partners. González partnered Ray Ho but lost in the semifinals to Sriram Balaji and Anirudh Chandrasekar. Rojer partnered Theodore Winegar but lost in the quarterfinals to Luis Carlos Álvarez and Alan Magadán.

Balaji and Chandrasekar won the title after defeating Ivan Liutarevich and Miguel Ángel Reyes-Varela 6–3, 7–6^{(7–4)} in the final.

== Seeds ==
1. (Austria) Alexander Erler / (Netherlands) Bart Stevens (quarterfinals)
2. (United States) Mac Kiger / (United States) Ryan Seggerman (first round)
3. (Netherlands) Jean-Julien Rojer / (United States) Theodore Winegar (quarterfinals)
4. (United Kingdom) David Stevenson / (United Kingdom) Marcus Willis (quarterfinals)

== Draw ==
Key

- Q = Qualifier
- WC = Wild card
- LL = Lucky loser
- Alt = Alternate
- ITF = ITF entry
- PR = Protected ranking
- SR = Special ranking
- SE = Special exempt
- JE = Junior exempt
- JR = Junior Accelerator Programme entrant
- CO = College Accelerator Programme entrant
- NG = Next Gen Accelerator Program entrant
- w/o = Walkover
- r = Retired
- d = Defaulted

First round
1	(Austria) A Erler (Netherlands) B Stevens	6^{4}	7^{7}	[13]
(France) F Balshaw (Spain) D Jordà Sanchis	7^{7}	6^{4}	[11]
(Chile) T Barrios Vera (Colombia) N Mejía	2	6^{6}
I Liutarevich (Mexico) M Reyes-Varela	6	7^{8}
3	(Netherlands) J-J Rojer (United States) T Winegar	6	6
(Mexico) A Hernández (Mexico) R Pacheco Méndez	3	2
WC	(Mexico) LC Álvarez (Mexico) A Magadán	6	6
WC	(Colombia) Samuel Heredia (India) D Sharan	1	1
(South Korea) J-s Nam (Finland) P Niklas-Salminen	6	4	[4]
(India) S Balaji (India) A Chandrasekar	3	6	[10]
(Mexico) H Hach Verdugo (Venezuela) LD Martínez	2	6	[6]
4	(United Kingdom) D Stevenson (United Kingdom) M Willis	6	4	[10]
(Spain) P Llamas Ruiz (Jordan) A Shelbayh	6^{6}	6	[9]
(Australia) B Bayldon (United States) T Hilderbrand	7^{8}	3	[11]
(Mexico) S González (Chinese Taipei) R Ho	7^{7}	7^{7}
2	(United States) M Kiger (United States) R Seggerman	6^{5}	6^{5}

Quarterfinals
1	(Austria) A Erler (Netherlands) B Stevens	2	4
I Liutarevich (Mexico) M Reyes-Varela	6	6
3	(Netherlands) J-J Rojer (United States) T Winegar	2	6^{5}
WC	(Mexico) LC Álvarez (Mexico) A Magadán	6	7^{7}
(India) S Balaji (India) A Chandrasekar	4	7	[12]
4	(United Kingdom) D Stevenson (United Kingdom) M Willis	6	5	[10]
(Australia) B Bayldon (United States) T Hilderbrand	7^{7}	3	[7]
(Mexico) S González (Chinese Taipei) R Ho	6^{2}	6	[10]

Semifinals
I Liutarevich (Mexico) M Reyes-Varela	6	6
WC	(Mexico) LC Álvarez (Mexico) A Magadán	3	3
(India) S Balaji (India) A Chandrasekar	3	6	[10]
(Mexico) S González (Chinese Taipei) R Ho	6	3	[3]

Final
I Liutarevich (Mexico) M Reyes-Varela	3	6^{4}
(India) S Balaji (India) A Chandrasekar	6	7^{7}
