= 2021 Uruguay Open – Singles =

Singles
- 2021 Uruguay Open

Final
- Champion: (Bolivia) Hugo Dellien
- Runner-up: (Argentina) Juan Ignacio Londero
- Score: 6–0, 6–1

Events
Singles	Doubles
- Uruguay Open

Jaume Munar was the defending champion but lost in the semifinals to Juan Ignacio Londero.

Hugo Dellien won the title after defeating Londero 6–0, 6–1 in the final.

== Seeds ==
1. (Argentina) Federico Coria (semifinals)
2. (Spain) Jaume Munar (semifinals)
3. (Argentina) Facundo Bagnis (quarterfinals, retired)
4. (Brazil) Thiago Monteiro (quarterfinals)
5. (Argentina) Francisco Cerúndolo (first round)
6. (Peru) Juan Pablo Varillas (second round)
7. (Bolivia) Hugo Dellien (champion)
8. (Argentina) Tomás Martín Etcheverry (second round)

== Draw ==
Key

- Q = Qualifier
- WC = Wild card
- LL = Lucky loser
- Alt = Alternate
- ITF = ITF entry
- PR = Protected ranking
- SR = Special ranking
- SE = Special exempt
- JE = Junior exempt
- JR = Junior Accelerator Programme entrant
- CO = College Accelerator Programme entrant
- NG = Next Gen Accelerator Program entrant
- w/o = Walkover
- r = Retired
- d = Defaulted

=== Finals ===
Semifinals
1	(Argentina) Federico Coria	6	6^{5}	6^{4}
7	(Bolivia) Hugo Dellien	2	7^{7}	7^{7}
(Argentina) Juan Ignacio Londero	0	6	6
2	(Spain) Jaume Munar	6	4	4

Final
7	(Bolivia) Hugo Dellien	6	6
(Argentina) Juan Ignacio Londero	0	1

=== Top half ===
First round
1	(Argentina) F Coria	6	5	6
(Argentina) A Collarini	3	7	3
(Chile) MT Barrios Vera	4	5
(Brazil) M Pucinelli de Almeida	6	7
(Argentina) TA Tirante	6	3	6^{3}
Alt	(Argentina) S Rodríguez Taverna	4	6	7^{7}
WC	(Uruguay) F Roncadelli	3	1
6	(Peru) JP Varillas	6	6
3	(Argentina) F Bagnis	6	7^{7}
Q	(Argentina) G Villanueva	1	6^{4}
Q	(Argentina) F Comesaña	6	7
Q	(Argentina) Facundo Juárez	4	5
(Chile) A Tabilo	3	4
(Kazakhstan) T Skatov	6	6
WC	(Uruguay) F Llanes	2	4
7	(Bolivia) H Dellien	6	6

Second round
1	(Argentina) F Coria	6	6
(Brazil) M Pucinelli de Almeida	0	3
Alt	(Argentina) S Rodríguez Taverna	3	7^{7}	7^{8}
6	(Peru) JP Varillas	6	6^{4}	6^{6}
3	(Argentina) F Bagnis	6	7
Q	(Argentina) F Comesaña	4	5
(Kazakhstan) T Skatov	4	6	3
7	(Bolivia) H Dellien	6	4	6

Quarterfinals
1	(Argentina) F Coria	6	6
Alt	(Argentina) S Rodríguez Taverna	3	4
3	(Argentina) F Bagnis	6^{4}	1^{r}
7	(Bolivia) H Dellien	7^{7}	4

Semifinals
1	(Argentina) F Coria	6	6^{5}	6^{4}
7	(Bolivia) H Dellien	2	7^{7}	7^{7}

=== Bottom half ===
First round
5	(Argentina) F Cerúndolo	4	6	2
(Argentina) JI Londero	6	4	6
Alt	(Argentina) H Casanova	6	7^{7}
(Brazil) F Meligeni Alves	3	6^{3}
(Argentina) JP Ficovich	6	6
WC	(Uruguay) M Cuevas	3	2
(Argentina) R Olivo	7^{7}	2	6^{4}
4	(Brazil) T Monteiro	6^{2}	6	7^{7}
8	(Argentina) TM Etcheverry	6	6
Alt	(Argentina) GA Olivieri	1	4
(Argentina) C Ugo Carabelli	3	6	6
Q	(Italy) L Darderi	6	3	4
(Argentina) G Andreozzi	6	3	3
(Argentina) P Cachin	4	6	6
(Argentina) F Mena	1	2
2	(Spain) J Munar	6	6

Second round
(Argentina) JI Londero	6	6
Alt	(Argentina) H Casanova	4	2
(Argentina) JP Ficovich	1	2
4	(Brazil) T Monteiro	6	6
8	(Argentina) TM Etcheverry	6	2	5
(Argentina) C Ugo Carabelli	4	6	7
(Argentina) P Cachin	4	6^{4}
2	(Spain) J Munar	6	7^{7}

Quarterfinals
(Argentina) JI Londero	6	7^{7}
4	(Brazil) T Monteiro	3	6^{1}
(Argentina) C Ugo Carabelli	4	1
2	(Spain) J Munar	6	6

Semifinals
(Argentina) JI Londero	0	6	6
2	(Spain) J Munar	6	4	4
