= 2021 Uruguay Open =

Tennis tournament

- Date: 8–14 November
- Edition: 16th
- Category: ATP Challenger 80
- Prize money: $52,080
- Surface: Clay
- Location: Montevideo, Uruguay
- Venue: Carrasco Lawn Tennis Club

Champions

Singles
- (Bolivia) Hugo Dellien

Doubles
- (Brazil) Rafael Matos / (Brazil) Felipe Meligeni Alves
- Uruguay Open

The 2021 Uruguay Open was a professional tennis tournament played on red clay courts in Montevideo. It was the 16th edition of the tournament for the men which was part of the 2021 ATP Challenger Tour. It took place at the Carrasco Lawn Tennis Club in Montevideo, Uruguay between November 8 and 14, 2021. The 2020 edition could not take place due to the COVID-19 pandemic.

== Singles main-draw entrants ==
=== Seeds ===
Country	Player	Rank^{1}	Seed
ARG	Federico Coria	72	1
ESP	Jaume Munar	78	2
ARG	Facundo Bagnis	79	3
BRA	Thiago Monteiro	94	4
ARG	Francisco Cerúndolo	115	5
PER	Juan Pablo Varillas	128	6
BOL	Hugo Dellien	129	7
ARG	Tomás Martín Etcheverry	131	8

- ^{1} Rankings are as of 1 November 2021.

=== Other entrants ===
The following players received wildcards into the singles main draw:

- (Uruguay) Martín Cuevas
- (Uruguay) Francisco Llanes
- (Uruguay) Franco Roncadelli

The following players received entry into the singles main draw as alternates:

- (Argentina) Hernán Casanova
- (Argentina) Genaro Alberto Olivieri
- (Argentina) Santiago Rodríguez Taverna

The following players received entry from the qualifying draw:

- (Argentina) Francisco Comesaña
- (Italy) Luciano Darderi
- (Argentina) Facundo Juárez
- (Argentina) Gonzalo Villanueva

== Champions ==
=== Singles ===
- (Bolivia) Hugo Dellien def. (Argentina) Juan Ignacio Londero 6–0, 6–1.

=== Doubles ===
- (Brazil) Rafael Matos / (Brazil) Felipe Meligeni Alves def. (Uruguay) Ignacio Carou / (Italy) Luciano Darderi 6–4, 6–4.
