= 2022 Grand Prix Hassan II – Doubles =

Doubles
- 2022 Grand Prix Hassan II

Final
- Champions: (Brazil) Rafael Matos (Spain) David Vega Hernández
- Runners-up: (Italy) Andrea Vavassori (Poland) Jan Zieliński
- Score: 6–1, 7–5

Events
Singles	Doubles
- Grand Prix Hassan II

Rafael Matos and David Vega Hernández defeated Andrea Vavassori and Jan Zieliński in the final, 6–1, 7–5, to win the doubles tennis title at the 2022 Grand Prix Hassan II.

Jürgen Melzer and Franko Škugor were the defending champions from when the tournament was last held in 2019. Neither returned to defend their title after Melzer retired from professional tennis at the end of 2021 and Škugor withdrew before the beginning of the tournament.

== Seeds ==
1. (Kazakhstan) Andrey Golubev / (France) Fabrice Martin (semifinals)
2. (Belgium) Sander Gillé / (Belgium) Joran Vliegen (first round)
3. (Uruguay) Ariel Behar / (Netherlands) Matwé Middelkoop (first round)
4. (Israel) Jonathan Erlich / (France) Édouard Roger-Vasselin (first round)

== Draw ==
Key

- Q = Qualifier
- WC = Wild card
- LL = Lucky loser
- Alt = Alternate
- ITF = ITF entry
- PR = Protected ranking
- SR = Special ranking
- SE = Special exempt
- JE = Junior exempt
- JR = Junior Accelerator Programme entrant
- CO = College Accelerator Programme entrant
- NG = Next Gen Accelerator Program entrant
- w/o = Walkover
- r = Retired
- d = Defaulted

=== Draw ===
First round
1	(Kazakhstan) A Golubev (France) F Martin	6^{6}	7^{7}	[10]
(Netherlands) T Griekspoor (Netherlands) B van de Zandschulp	7^{8}	6^{2}	[6]
WC	(Morocco) E Benchetrit (Morocco) L Ouahab	6	6
WC	(Morocco) W Ahouda (Morocco) M Benchakroun	1	2
4	(Israel) J Erlich (France) É Roger-Vasselin	6^{8}	3
(Italy) A Vavassori (Poland) J Zieliński	7^{10}	6
(Monaco) R Arneodo (Monaco) H Nys	4	4
(Argentina) F Delbonis (Argentina) G Durán	6	6
(Brazil) R Matos (Spain) D Vega Hernández	2	7^{7}	[10]
(Czech Republic) R Jebavý (Austria) P Oswald	6	6^{3}	[6]
Alt	(Bosnia and Herzegovina) M Bašić (Bosnia and Herzegovina) D Džumhur	7^{8}	6^{4}	[10]
3	(Uruguay) A Behar (Netherlands) M Middelkoop	6^{6}	7^{7}	[7]
Alt	(Italy) M Cecchinato (Italy) L Musetti	6	1	[10]
(United Kingdom) L Glasspool (Finland) H Heliövaara	4	6	[7]
(Kazakhstan) A Nedovyesov (Pakistan) A-u-H Qureshi	6	6
2	(Belgium) S Gillé (Belgium) J Vliegen	3	4

Quarterfinals
1	(Kazakhstan) A Golubev (France) F Martin	6	7^{7}
WC	(Morocco) E Benchetrit (Morocco) L Ouahab	3	6^{4}
(Italy) A Vavassori (Poland) J Zieliński	3	7^{9}	[10]
(Argentina) F Delbonis (Argentina) G Durán	6	6^{7}	[3]
(Brazil) R Matos (Spain) D Vega Hernández	6	6
Alt	(Bosnia and Herzegovina) M Bašić (Bosnia and Herzegovina) D Džumhur	3	4
Alt	(Italy) M Cecchinato (Italy) L Musetti	5	3
(Kazakhstan) A Nedovyesov (Pakistan) A-u-H Qureshi	7	6

Semifinals
1	(Kazakhstan) A Golubev (France) F Martin	7^{7}	6^{5}	[9]
(Italy) A Vavassori (Poland) J Zieliński	6^{4}	7^{7}	[11]
(Brazil) R Matos (Spain) D Vega Hernández	7	7^{8}
(Kazakhstan) A Nedovyesov (Pakistan) A-u-H Qureshi	5	6^{6}

Final
(Italy) A Vavassori (Poland) J Zieliński	1	5
(Brazil) R Matos (Spain) D Vega Hernández	6	7
