= 2022 Rakuten Japan Open Tennis Championships – Singles =

Singles
- 2022 Rakuten Japan Open Tennis Championships

Final
- Champion: (United States) Taylor Fritz
- Runner-up: (United States) Frances Tiafoe
- Score: 7–6^{(7–3)}, 7–6^{(7–2)}

Details
- Draw: 32 (4Q / 3WC)
- Seeds: 8

Events
Singles	Doubles
← 2019 ·	Japan Open	· 2023 →

Taylor Fritz defeated Frances Tiafoe in the final, 7–6^{(7–3)}, 7–6^{(7–2)} to win the singles tennis title at the 2022 Japan Open.

Novak Djokovic was the reigning champion from when the event was last held in 2019, but chose to compete in Astana instead.

== Seeds ==
1. (Norway) Casper Ruud (first round)
2. (United Kingdom) Cameron Norrie (withdrew)
3. (United States) Taylor Fritz (champion)
4. (United States) Frances Tiafoe (final)
5. (Australia) Nick Kyrgios (quarterfinals, withdrew)
6. (Australia) Alex de Minaur (first round)
7. (Canada) Denis Shapovalov (semifinals)
8. (United Kingdom) Dan Evans (second round)
9. (Croatia) Borna Ćorić (quarterfinals)

== Draw ==
Key

- Q = Qualifier
- WC = Wild card
- LL = Lucky loser
- Alt = Alternate
- ITF = ITF entry
- PR = Protected ranking
- SR = Special ranking
- SE = Special exempt
- JE = Junior exempt
- JR = Junior Accelerator Programme entrant
- CO = College Accelerator Programme entrant
- NG = Next Gen Accelerator Program entrant
- w/o = Walkover
- r = Retired
- d = Defaulted

=== Finals ===
Semifinals
(South Korea) Kwon Soon-woo	2	6	4
4	(United States) Frances Tiafoe	6	0	6
3	(United States) Taylor Fritz	6	6^{5}	6
7	(Canada) Denis Shapovalov	3	7^{7}	3

Final
4	(United States) Frances Tiafoe	6^{3}	6^{2}
3	(United States) Taylor Fritz	7^{7}	7^{7}

=== Top half ===
First round
1	(Norway) C Ruud	3	3
(Spain) J Munar	6	6
(Spain) P Martínez	7	6
(Australia) A Popyrin	5	4
(United States) M McDonald	7^{7}	6^{2}	6
WC	(Japan) K Uchida	6^{4}	7^{7}	3
(South Korea) S-w Kwon	6	6
6	(Australia) A de Minaur	3	2
4	(United States) F Tiafoe	6	6
WC	(Japan) Y Uchiyama	3	4
(Japan) T Daniel	5	5
(Spain) B Zapata Miralles	7	7
(Serbia) M Kecmanović	2	7^{7}	6
(Japan) Y Nishioka	6	6^{1}	2
(Moldova) R Albot	7^{7}	1	4
8	(United Kingdom) D Evans	6^{3}	6	6

Second round
(Spain) J Munar	6	3	1
(Spain) P Martínez	4	6	6
(United States) M McDonald	3	7^{7}	2
(South Korea) S-w Kwon	6	6^{4}	6
4	(United States) F Tiafoe	6	7^{9}
(Spain) B Zapata Miralles	1	6^{7}
(Serbia) M Kecmanović	6	3	7^{7}
8	(United Kingdom) D Evans	3	6	6^{4}

Quarterfinals
(Spain) P Martínez	3	0
(South Korea) S-w Kwon	6	6
4	(United States) F Tiafoe	6	6
(Serbia) M Kecmanović	0	4

Semifinals
(South Korea) S-w Kwon	2	6	4
4	(United States) F Tiafoe	6	0	6

=== Bottom half ===
First round
5	(Australia) N Kyrgios	6	6
(Chinese Taipei) C-h Tseng	3	1
Q	(Japan) S Shimabukuro	6^{2}	2
(Poland) K Majchrzak	7^{7}	6
LL	(Japan) H Moriya	6	6
Q	(Japan) Y Shimizu	1	3
(Australia) J Duckworth	2	7^{7}	1
3	(United States) T Fritz	6	6^{2}	6
7	(Canada) D Shapovalov	6	7^{7}
(United States) S Johnson	3	6^{3}
Q	(Japan) R Noguchi	6	3	7^{7}
Q	(India) R Ramanathan	4	6	6^{1}
(United States) B Nakashima	6	6
WC	(Japan) S Mochizuki	3	2
(Australia) T Kokkinakis	4	6^{4}
9	(Croatia) B Ćorić	6	7^{7}

Second round
5	(Australia) N Kyrgios	3	6	6
(Poland) K Majchrzak	6	2	2
LL	(Japan) H Moriya	1	6	4
3	(United States) T Fritz	6	3	6
7	(Canada) D Shapovalov	6	6
Q	(Japan) R Noguchi	3	1
(United States) B Nakashima	5	2
9	(Croatia) B Ćorić	7	6

Quarterfinals
5	(Australia) N Kyrgios
3	(United States) T Fritz	w/o
7	(Canada) D Shapovalov	6	6
9	(Croatia) B Ćorić	4	3

Semifinals
3	(United States) T Fritz	6	6^{5}	6
7	(Canada) D Shapovalov	3	7^{7}	3

== Qualifying ==
=== Seeds ===
1. (Chile) Nicolás Jarry (first round)
2. (Sweden) Elias Ymer (qualifying competition)
3. (Japan) Hiroki Moriya (qualifying competition, lucky loser)
4. (Japan) Rio Noguchi (qualified)
5. (Australia) Max Purcell (qualifying competition)
6. (India) Ramkumar Ramanathan (qualified)
7. (Tunisia) Aziz Dougaz (first round)
8. (Japan) Sho Shimabukuro (qualified)

=== Qualifiers ===
1. (Japan) Yuta Shimizu
2. (India) Ramkumar Ramanathan
3. (Japan) Sho Shimabukuro
4. (Japan) Rio Noguchi

=== Lucky loser ===
1. (Japan) Hiroki Moriya

=== Qualifying draw ===
==== First qualifier ====
First round
1	(Chile) Nicolás Jarry	4	4
WC	(Japan) Yuta Shimizu	6	6
WC	(Japan) Shintaro Imai	6	6^{5}	5
5	(Australia) Max Purcell	4	7^{7}	7

Qualifying competition
WC	(Japan) Yuta Shimizu	6	6
5	(Australia) Max Purcell	3	4

==== Second qualifier ====
First round
2	(Sweden) Elias Ymer	7^{7}	6
WC	(Japan) Renta Tokuda	6^{3}	3
Alt	(Japan) Ryota Tanuma	5	3
6	(India) Ramkumar Ramanathan	7	6

Qualifying competition
2	(Sweden) Elias Ymer	7	4	1
6	(India) Ramkumar Ramanathan	5	6	6

==== Third qualifier ====
First round
3	(Japan) Hiroki Moriya	6	6
(Japan) Yuki Mochizuki	3	4
(Japan) Go Soeda	3	4
8	(Japan) Sho Shimabukuro	6	6

Qualifying competition
3	(Japan) Hiroki Moriya	7	3	3
8	(Japan) Sho Shimabukuro	5	6	6

==== Fourth qualifier ====
First round
4	(Japan) Rio Noguchi	6	6
PR	(Japan) Tatsuma Ito	0	2
Alt	(Japan) Yusuke Takahashi	6	6
7	(Tunisia) Aziz Dougaz	3	1

Qualifying competition
4	(Japan) Rio Noguchi	0	6	6
Alt	(Japan) Yusuke Takahashi	6	2	0
