= 2021 Córdoba Open – Doubles =

Doubles
- 2021 Córdoba Open

Final
- Champions: (Brazil) Rafael Matos (Brazil) Felipe Meligeni Alves
- Runners-up: (Monaco) Romain Arneodo (France) Benoît Paire
- Score: 6–4, 6–1

Events
| Singles | Doubles |
- Córdoba Open

Marcelo Demoliner and Matwé Middelkoop were the defending champions, but Middelkoop decided to participate in the 2021 Open Sud de France instead. Demoliner was pairing up with Santiago González, but they lost in the first round to Guillermo Durán and Andrés Molteni.

Rafael Matos and Felipe Meligeni Alves won the title, defeating Romain Arneodo and Benoît Paire in the final, 6–4, 6–1.

== Seeds ==
1. (United States) Austin Krajicek / (Croatia) Franko Škugor (quarterfinals)
2. (Brazil) Marcelo Demoliner / (Mexico) Santiago González (first round)
3. (Uruguay) Ariel Behar / (Ecuador) Gonzalo Escobar (first round)
4. (Bosnia and Herzegovina) Tomislav Brkić / (Serbia) Nikola Ćaćić (first round)

== Draw ==
Key

- Q = Qualifier
- WC = Wild card
- LL = Lucky loser
- Alt = Alternate
- ITF = ITF entry
- PR = Protected ranking
- SR = Special ranking
- SE = Special exempt
- JE = Junior exempt
- JR = Junior Accelerator Programme entrant
- CO = College Accelerator Programme entrant
- NG = Next Gen Accelerator Program entrant
- w/o = Walkover
- r = Retired
- d = Defaulted

=== Draw ===
First round
1 | (United States) A Krajicek (Croatia) F Škugor | 6 | 6
(Spain) R Carballés Baena (Spain) A Ramos Viñolas | 2 | 4
(Argentina) F Coria (Bolivia) H Dellien | 1 | 1
(Brazil) R Matos (Brazil) F Meligeni Alves | 6 | 6
3 | (Uruguay) A Behar (Ecuador) G Escobar | 2 | 6^{2}
(Germany) D Koepfer (Portugal) J Sousa | 6 | 7^{7}
WC | (Austria) O Marach (Argentina) A Velotti | 4 | 7^{7} | [10]
(Serbia) M Kecmanović (Italy) G Mager | 6 | 6^{5} | [8]
(United States) N Monroe (New Zealand) A Sitak | 6 | 3 | [6]
(Monaco) R Arneodo (France) B Paire | 3 | 6 | [10]
WC | (Argentina) F Bagnis (Argentina) M González | 7 | 7^{7}
4 | (Bosnia and Herzegovina) T Brkić (Serbia) N Ćaćić | 5 | 6^{5}
(Brazil) T Monteiro (Brazil) F Romboli | 3 | 3
(Argentina) F Delbonis (Argentina) JI Londero | 6 | 6
(Argentina) G Durán (Argentina) A Molteni | 6 | 6
2 | (Brazil) M Demoliner (Mexico) S González | 0 | 2

Quarterfinals
1 | (United States) A Krajicek (Croatia) F Škugor | 6^{6} | 7 | [2]
(Brazil) R Matos (Brazil) F Meligeni Alves | 7^{8} | 5 | [10]
(Germany) D Koepfer (Portugal) J Sousa | 6 | 6
WC | (Austria) O Marach (Argentina) A Velotti | 3 | 4
(Monaco) R Arneodo (France) B Paire | 7^{7} | 4 | [10]
WC | (Argentina) F Bagnis (Argentina) M González | 6^{1} | 6 | [7]
(Argentina) F Delbonis (Argentina) JI Londero | 7^{7} | 6^{3} | [10]
(Argentina) G Durán (Argentina) A Molteni | 6^{3} | 7^{7} | [12]

Semifinals
(Brazil) R Matos (Brazil) F Meligeni Alves | 7^{7} | 6^{5} | [10]
(Germany) D Koepfer (Portugal) J Sousa | 6^{0} | 7^{7} | [6]
(Monaco) R Arneodo (France) B Paire | 6 | 3 | [10]
(Argentina) G Durán (Argentina) A Molteni | 3 | 6 | [6]

Final
(Brazil) R Matos (Brazil) F Meligeni Alves | 6 | 6
(Monaco) R Arneodo (France) B Paire | 4 | 1
