= 2026 Cancún Country Open – Singles =

Singles
- 2026 Cancún Country Open

Final
- Champion: (Poland) Hubert Hurkacz
- Runner-up: (Argentina) Sebastián Báez
- Score: 4–6, 6–0, 6–3

Events
Singles	Doubles
- Cancún Country Open

Dalibor Svrčina was the defending champion but lost in the first round to Stan Wawrinka.

Hubert Hurkacz won the title after defeating Sebastián Báez 4–6, 6–0, 6–3 in the final.

== Seeds ==
The top four seeds received a bye into the second round.

1. (Argentina) Sebastián Báez (final)
2. (Argentina) Román Andrés Burruchaga (second round)
3. (Poland) Hubert Hurkacz (champion)
4. (Czech Republic) Vít Kopřiva (quarterfinals)
5. (Argentina) Camilo Ugo Carabelli (second round, retired)
6. (Hong Kong) Coleman Wong (quarterfinals)
7. Roman Safiullin (quarterfinals)
8. (Argentina) Francisco Comesaña (first round)

== Draw ==
Key

- Q = Qualifier
- WC = Wild card
- LL = Lucky loser
- Alt = Alternate
- ITF = ITF entry
- PR = Protected ranking
- SR = Special ranking
- SE = Special exempt
- JE = Junior exempt
- JR = Junior Accelerator Programme entrant
- CO = College Accelerator Programme entrant
- NG = Next Gen Accelerator Program entrant
- w/o = Walkover
- r = Retired
- d = Defaulted

=== Finals ===
Semifinals
1	(Argentina) Sebastián Báez	6	6
Q	(South Africa) Lloyd Harris	4	4
3/WC	(Poland) Hubert Hurkacz	6	6
Alt	(Tunisia) Moez Echargui	3	4

Final
1	(Argentina) Sebastián Báez	6	0	3
3/WC	(Poland) Hubert Hurkacz	4	6	6

=== Top half ===
First round
WC	(Mexico) R Pacheco Méndez	7^{7}	6
Alt	(Chile) T Barrios Vera	6^{5}	2
Q	(Mexico) A Magadán	4	6	6
WC	(Mexico) A Hernández	6	0	4
Alt	(France) A Müller	2	2
6	(Hong Kong) C Wong	6	6
Q	(Belgium) G Onclin	2	6	6
Alt	(Kazakhstan) T Skatov	6	2	3
NG	(United States) Dar Blanch	4	2
Q	(South Africa) L Harris	6	6
Alt	(Spain) P Llamas Ruiz	6	7
8	(Argentina) F Comesaña	3	5

Second round
1	(Argentina) S Báez	6	6
WC	(Mexico) R Pacheco Méndez	4	3
Q	(Mexico) A Magadán	4	6	6^{3}
6	(Hong Kong) C Wong	6	1	7^{7}
4	(Czech Republic) V Kopřiva	6	6
Q	(Belgium) G Onclin	4	4
Q	(South Africa) L Harris	6	4
Alt	(Spain) P Llamas Ruiz	4	3^{r}

Quarterfinals
1	(Argentina) S Báez	6	6
6	(Hong Kong) C Wong	4	0
4	(Czech Republic) V Kopřiva	5	4
Q	(South Africa) L Harris	7	6

Semifinals
1	(Argentina) S Báez	6	6
Q	(South Africa) L Harris	4	4

=== Bottom half ===
First round
7	R Safiullin	6	6
(Austria) S Ofner	3	4
(Czech Republic) D Svrčina	6^{6}	6^{3}
(Switzerland) S Wawrinka	7^{8}	7^{7}
(Portugal) H Rocha	6	6
Alt	(South Korea) S-c Hong	4	1
5	(Argentina) C Ugo Carabelli	7	6
Alt	(Colombia) N Mejía	5	4
(Finland) O Virtanen	6^{5}	6^{5}
Alt	(Tunisia) M Echargui	7^{7}	7^{7}
Q	(Brazil) F Meligeni Alves	1	4
NG	(France) M Kouamé	6	6

Second round
7	R Safiullin	6	6
(Switzerland) S Wawrinka	3	4
(Portugal) H Rocha	2	6	4
3/WC	(Poland) H Hurkacz	6	4	6
5	(Argentina) C Ugo Carabelli	2	0^{r}
Alt	(Tunisia) M Echargui	6	5
NG	(France) M Kouamé	6	6
2	(Argentina) RA Burruchaga	2	2

Quarterfinals
7	R Safiullin	4	3
3/WC	(Poland) H Hurkacz	6	6
Alt	(Tunisia) M Echargui	6	2	7^{7}
NG	(France) M Kouamé	4	6	6^{5}

Semifinals
3/WC	(Poland) H Hurkacz	6	6
Alt	(Tunisia) M Echargui	3	4
