= 2021 Córdoba Open =

- Date: 20–28 February
- Edition: 3rd
- Category: ATP Tour 250 series
- Draw: 28S / 16D
- Prize money: $393,935
- Surface: Clay / outdoor
- Location: Córdoba, Argentina
- Venue: Estadio Mario Alberto Kempes

Champions

Singles
- (Argentina) Juan Manuel Cerúndolo

Doubles
- (Brazil) Rafael Matos / (Brazil) Felipe Meligeni Alves
- Córdoba Open

The 2021 Córdoba Open was a men's tennis tournament played on outdoor clay courts. It was the third edition of the Córdoba Open, and part of the ATP Tour 250 series of the 2021 ATP Tour. It took place at the Estadio Mario Alberto Kempes in Córdoba, Argentina, from 20 February until 28 February 2021.

== Finals ==
=== Singles ===
- (Argentina) Juan Manuel Cerúndolo defeated (Spain) Albert Ramos Viñolas, 6–0, 2–6, 6–2.

=== Doubles ===
- (Brazil) Rafael Matos / (Brazil) Felipe Meligeni Alves defeated (Monaco) Romain Arneodo / (France) Benoît Paire, 6–4, 6–1.

== Points and prize money ==
=== Point distribution ===
Event	W	F	SF	QF	Round of 16	Round of 32	Q	Q3	Q2	Q1
Singles	250	150	90	45	20	0	12	6	3	0
Doubles	250	150	90	45	0	—N/a	—N/a	—N/a	—N/a	—N/a

=== Prize money ===
Event	W	F	SF	QF	Round of 16	Round of 32	Q3	Q2	Q1
Singles	$24,110	$17,810	$13,350	$9,125	$6,235	$4,450	$3,360	$2,280	$1,260
Doubles	$8,400	$6,140	$4,680	$3,350	$2,450	—N/a	—N/a	—N/a	—N/a
Doubles prize money per team

== Singles main-draw entrants ==
=== Seeds ===
Country	Player	Rank^{1}	Seed
ARG	Diego Schwartzman	9	1
FRA	Benoît Paire	29	2
SRB	Miomir Kecmanović	41	3
~~ARG~~	~~Guido Pella~~	~~44~~	~~4~~
ESP	Albert Ramos Viñolas	46	5
GER	Dominik Koepfer	70	6
BRA	Thiago Monteiro	74	7
ARG	Federico Delbonis	80	8

- ^{1} Rankings are as of February 8, 2021

=== Other entrants ===
The following players received wildcards into the singles main draw:

- (Argentina) Francisco Cerúndolo
- (Chile) Nicolás Jarry
- (Argentina) Nicolás Kicker

The following players received entry from the qualifying draw:

- (Argentina) Facundo Bagnis
- (Chile) Marcelo Tomás Barrios Vera
- (Argentina) Juan Manuel Cerúndolo
- (Argentina) Tomás Martín Etcheverry

The following player received entry as a lucky loser:

- (Brazil) João Menezes

=== Withdrawals ===
Before the tournament

- (Spain) Pablo Andújar → replaced by (Brazil) Thiago Seyboth Wild
- (Italy) Salvatore Caruso → replaced by (Slovakia) Andrej Martin
- (Uruguay) Pablo Cuevas → replaced by (Slovakia) Jozef Kovalík
- (Serbia) Laslo Đere → replaced by (Bolivia) Hugo Dellien
- (Spain) Pedro Martínez → replaced by (Colombia) Daniel Elahi Galán
- (Argentina) Guido Pella → replaced by (Brazil) João Menezes

== Doubles main-draw entrants ==
=== Seeds ===
Country	Player	Country	Player	Rank^{1}	Seed
USA	Austin Krajicek	CRO	Franko Škugor	71	1
BRA	Marcelo Demoliner	MEX	Santiago González	90	2
URU	Ariel Behar	ECU	Gonzalo Escobar	119	3
BIH	Tomislav Brkić	SRB	Nikola Ćaćić	137	4

- ^{1} Rankings are as of January 25, 2021

=== Other entrants ===
The following pairs received wildcards into the doubles main draw:

- (Argentina) Facundo Bagnis / (Argentina) Máximo González
- (Austria) Oliver Marach / (Argentina) Agustín Velotti

=== Withdrawals ===
Before the tournament

- (Italy) Marco Cecchinato / (Argentina) Guido Pella → replaced by (Brazil) Thiago Monteiro / (Brazil) Fernando Romboli
- (Italy) Salvatore Caruso / (Argentina) Máximo González → replaced by (Argentina) Federico Delbonis / (Argentina) Juan Ignacio Londero
- (Spain) Pablo Andújar / (Spain) Pedro Martínez → replaced by (Argentina) Federico Coria / (Bolivia) Hugo Dellien
- (Uruguay) Pablo Cuevas / (Austria) Oliver Marach → replaced by (Brazil) Rafael Matos / (Brazil) Felipe Meligeni Alves
