= 2026 Cancún Country Open =

- Date: 18–23 August
- Edition: 2nd
- Surface: Hard
- Location: Cancún, Mexico

Champions

Singles
- (Poland) Hubert Hurkacz

Doubles
- (India) Sriram Balaji / (India) Anirudh Chandrasekar
- Cancún Country Open

The 2026 Europcar Cancún Country Open was a professional tennis tournament played on hardcourts. It was the second edition of the tournament which was part of the 2026 ATP Challenger Tour. It took place in Cancún, Mexico between 18 and 23 August 2026.

== Singles main draw entrants ==
=== Seeds ===
| Country | Player | Rank^{1} | Seed |
|---|---|---|---|
| ARG | Sebastián Báez | 53 | 1 |
| ARG | Román Andrés Burruchaga | 61 | 2 |
| POL | Hubert Hurkacz | 69 | 3 |
| CZE | Vít Kopřiva | 71 | 4 |
| ARG | Camilo Ugo Carabelli | 76 | 5 |
| HKG | Coleman Wong | 93 | 6 |
| | Roman Safiullin | 103 | 7 |
| ARG | Francisco Comesaña | 109 | 8 |

- ^{1} Rankings as of 10 August 2026.

=== Other entrants ===
The following players received wildcards into the singles main draw:

- (Mexico) Alex Hernández
- (Poland) Hubert Hurkacz
- (Mexico) Rodrigo Pacheco Méndez

The following players received entry into the singles main draw through the Next Gen Accelerator programme:

- (United States) Darwin Blanch
- (France) Moïse Kouamé

The following players received entry into the singles main draw as alternates:

- (Chile) Tomás Barrios Vera
- (Tunisia) Moez Echargui
- (South Korea) Hong Seong-chan
- (Spain) Pablo Llamas Ruiz
- (Colombia) Nicolás Mejía
- (France) Alexandre Müller
- (Kazakhstan) Timofey Skatov

The following players received entry from the qualifying draw:

- (South Africa) Lloyd Harris
- (Mexico) Alan Magadán
- (Brazil) Felipe Meligeni Alves
- (Belgium) Gauthier Onclin

== Champions ==
=== Singles ===
- (Poland) Hubert Hurkacz def. (Argentina) Sebastián Báez 4–6, 6–0, 6–3.

=== Doubles ===
- (India) Sriram Balaji / (India) Anirudh Chandrasekar def. Ivan Liutarevich / (Mexico) Miguel Ángel Reyes-Varela 6–3, 7–6^{(7–4)}.
