= 2025 Cancún Country Open =

- Date: 12–17 August
- Edition: 1st
- Surface: Hard
- Location: Cancún, Mexico

Champions

Singles
- (Czech Republic) Dalibor Svrčina

Doubles
- (Mexico) Santiago González / (Netherlands) Jean-Julien Rojer
- Cancún Country Open

The 2025 Europcar Cancún Country Open was a professional tennis tournament played on hardcourts. It was the first edition of the tournament which was part of the 2025 ATP Challenger Tour. It took place in Cancún, Mexico between 12 and 17 August 2025.

== Singles main draw entrants ==
=== Seeds ===
Country	Player	Rank^{1}	Seed
GER	Daniel Altmaier	60	1
FRA	Arthur Cazaux	76	2
NED	Jesper de Jong	79	3
ARG	Juan Manuel Cerúndolo	86	4
AUS	Tristan Schoolkate	97	5
CHI	Alejandro Tabilo	103	6
~~CAN~~	~~Liam Draxl~~	~~114~~	~~7~~
CZE	Dalibor Svrčina	115	8

- ^{1} Rankings as of 4 August 2025.

=== Other entrants ===
The following players received wildcards into the singles main draw:

- (Germany) Daniel Altmaier
- (Mexico) Alex Hernández
- (Switzerland) Stan Wawrinka

The following player received entry into the singles main draw through the Next Gen Accelerator programme:

- (Mexico) Rodrigo Pacheco Méndez

The following players received entry into the singles main draw as alternates:

- (Peru) Ignacio Buse
- (Germany) Yannick Hanfmann
- (Germany) Jan-Lennard Struff
- (Argentina) Thiago Agustín Tirante
- (Argentina) Marco Trungelliti
- (Hong Kong) Coleman Wong

The following players received entry from the qualifying draw:

- (Canada) Alexis Galarneau
- (Canada) Cleeve Harper
- (Japan) Rio Noguchi
- (Kazakhstan) Beibit Zhukayev

The following player received entry as a lucky loser:

- (Spain) Pablo Llamas Ruiz

== Champions ==
=== Singles ===
- (Czech Republic) Dalibor Svrčina def. (Argentina) Thiago Agustín Tirante 6–4, 5–7, 6–4.

=== Doubles ===
- (Mexico) Santiago González / (Netherlands) Jean-Julien Rojer def. (France) Manuel Guinard / (Brazil) Rafael Matos 7–6^{(7–2)}, 7–5.
