= 2022 Grand Prix Hassan II =

- Date: 4–10 April
- Edition: 35th
- Draw: 32S / 16D
- Prize money: €597,900
- Surface: Clay
- Location: Marrakesh, Morocco

Champions

Singles
- (Belgium) David Goffin

Doubles
- (Brazil) Rafael Matos / (Spain) David Vega Hernández
- Grand Prix Hassan II

The 2022 Grand Prix Hassan II was a professional tennis tournament played in Marrakesh, Morocco on clay courts.

It was the 36th edition of the tournament and was classified as an ATP Tour 250 event on the 2022 ATP Tour. It took place from 4 April to 10 April 2022 after the COVID-19 pandemic forced the postponement of the event twice consecutively from its original schedule of 6 to 12 April 2020.

== Champions ==
=== Singles ===
- (Belgium) David Goffin def. (Slovakia) Alex Molčan, 3–6, 6–3, 6–3

=== Doubles ===
- (Brazil) Rafael Matos / (Spain) David Vega Hernández def. (Italy) Andrea Vavassori / (Poland) Jan Zieliński, 6–1, 7–5

== Point and prize money ==
=== Point ===
Event	W	F	SF	QF	Round of 16	Round of 32	Q	Q2	Q1
Singles	250	150	90	45	20	0	12	6	0
Doubles	250	150	90	45	0	—N/a	—N/a	—N/a	—N/a

=== Prize money ===
Event	W	F	SF	QF	Round of 16	Round of 32	Q2	Q1
Singles	€78,630	€45,770	€26,735	€15,115	€8,805	€5,275	€2,815	€1,565
Doubles*	€28,250	€15,110	€8,860	€4,950	€2,920	—N/a	—N/a	—N/a

_{*per team}

== Singles main draw entrants ==
=== Seeds ===
Country	Player	Rank^{†}	Seed
CAN	Félix Auger-Aliassime	9	1
GBR	Dan Evans	27	2
~~ITA~~	~~Fabio Fognini~~	~~34~~	~~3~~
ESP	Albert Ramos Viñolas	35	4
ARG	Federico Delbonis	36	5
NED	Botic van de Zandschulp	42	6
ESP	Alejandro Davidovich Fokina	43	7
SRB	Laslo Đere	53	8
NED	Tallon Griekspoor	57	9

^{†} Rankings are as of 21 March 2022

=== Other entrants ===
The following players received wildcard entry into the singles main draw:

- (Canada) Félix Auger-Aliassime
- (Morocco) Elliot Benchetrit
- (Tunisia) Malek Jaziri

The following player received entry as an alternate:

- (Italy) Stefano Travaglia

The following players received entry from qualifying draw:

- (Bosnia and Herzegovina) Mirza Bašić
- (Bosnia and Herzegovina) Damir Džumhur
- (Czech Republic) Vít Kopřiva
- Pavel Kotov

The following player received entry as a lucky loser:

- (Spain) Bernabé Zapata Miralles

=== Withdrawals ===
Before the tournament

- (Argentina) Sebastián Báez → replaced by (France) Richard Gasquet
- (France) Benjamin Bonzi → replaced by (Switzerland) Henri Laaksonen
- (Kazakhstan) Alexander Bublik → replaced by (Poland) Kamil Majchrzak
- (Italy) Fabio Fognini → replaced by (Italy) Stefano Travaglia
- Ilya Ivashka → replaced by (Spain) Carlos Taberner
- (Spain) Pedro Martínez → replaced by (Italy) Marco Cecchinato
- (France) Benoît Paire → replaced by (Germany) Yannick Hanfmann
- (Australia) Alexei Popyrin → replaced by (Spain) Bernabé Zapata Miralles
- (France) Arthur Rinderknech → replaced by (Bolivia) Hugo Dellien
- (Germany) Jan-Lennard Struff → replaced by (Portugal) João Sousa

== Doubles main draw entrants ==
=== Seeds ===
Country	Player	Country	Player	Rank^{1}	Seed
KAZ	Andrey Golubev	FRA	Fabrice Martin	66	1
BEL	Sander Gillé	BEL	Joran Vliegen	67	2
URU	Ariel Behar	NED	Matwé Middelkoop	73	3
ISR	Jonathan Erlich	FRA	Édouard Roger-Vasselin	110	4

- ^{1} Rankings as of March 21, 2022.

=== Other entrants ===
The following pairs received a wildcard into the doubles main draw:

- (Morocco) Walid Ahouda / (Morocco) Mehdi Benchakroun
- (Morocco) Elliot Benchetrit / (Morocco) Lamine Ouahab

The following pairs received entry as alternates:

- (Bosnia and Herzegovina) Mirza Bašić / (Bosnia and Herzegovina) Damir Džumhur
- (Italy) Marco Cecchinato / (Italy) Lorenzo Musetti

=== Withdrawals ===
Before the tournament

- (Spain) Pablo Andújar / (Spain) Pedro Martinez → replaced by (Argentina) Federico Delbonis / (Argentina) Guillermo Durán
- (Kazakhstan) Alexander Bublik / (Poland) Jan Zieliński → replaced by (Italy) Andrea Vavassori / (Poland) Jan Zieliński
- (India) Rohan Bopanna / (Netherlands) Matwé Middelkoop → replaced by (Uruguay) Ariel Behar / (Netherlands) Matwé Middelkoop
- (Argentina) Sebastián Báez / (Brazil) Rafael Matos → replaced by (Brazil) Rafael Matos / (Spain) David Vega Hernández
- (United Kingdom) Dan Evans / (United Kingdom) Ken Skupski → replaced by (Italy) Marco Cecchinato / (Italy) Lorenzo Musetti
- (Ukraine) Denys Molchanov / (Croatia) Franko Škugor → replaced by (Bosnia and Herzegovina) Mirza Bašić / (Bosnia and Herzegovina) Damir Džumhur
