= 2021 Uruguay Open – Doubles =

Doubles
- 2021 Uruguay Open

Final
- Champions: (Brazil) Rafael Matos (Brazil) Felipe Meligeni Alves
- Runners-up: (Uruguay) Ignacio Carou (Italy) Luciano Darderi
- Score: 6–4, 6–4

Events
Singles	Doubles
← 2019 ·	Uruguay Open	· 2022 →

Facundo Bagnis and Andrés Molteni were the defending champions but chose not to defend their title.

Rafael Matos and Felipe Meligeni Alves won the title after defeating Ignacio Carou and Luciano Darderi 6–4, 6–4 in the final.

== Seeds ==
1. (Brazil) Rafael Matos / (Brazil) Felipe Meligeni Alves (champions)
2. (Chile) Marcelo Tomás Barrios Vera / (Chile) Alejandro Tabilo (withdrew)
3. (Argentina) Tomás Martín Etcheverry / (Argentina) Renzo Olivo (semifinals, withdrew)
4. (Argentina) Francisco Cerúndolo / (Uruguay) Martín Cuevas (semifinals)

== Draw ==
=== Key ===
- Q = Qualifier
- WC = Wild card
- LL = Lucky loser
- Alt = Alternate
- SE = Special exempt
- PR = Protected ranking
- ITF = ITF entry
- JE = Junior exempt
- w/o = Walkover
- r = Retired
- d = Defaulted
- SR = Special ranking

First round
1	(Brazil) R Matos (Brazil) F Meligeni Alves	6	6
(Dominican Republic) R Cid Subervi (Argentina) GA Olivieri	2	1
WC	(Uruguay) D Acosta (Uruguay) R Arús	3	6	[4]
(Argentina) H Casanova (Argentina) S Rodríguez Taverna	6	1	[10]
4	(Argentina) F Cerúndolo (Uruguay) M Cuevas	6	6
(Brazil) Gilbert Klier Júnior (Brazil) M Pucinelli de Almeida	3	2
(Argentina) A Collarini (Argentina) G Durán	1	6	[10]
(Argentina) P Cachin (Argentina) C Ugo Carabelli	6	4	[8]
(Argentina) G Andreozzi (Argentina) JP Ficovich	4	6	[10]
WC	(Uruguay) F Llanes (Uruguay) F Roncadelli	6	3	[4]
(Spain) N Álvarez Varona (Kazakhstan) T Skatov	2	5
3	(Argentina) TM Etcheverry (Argentina) R Olivo	6	7
WC	(Uruguay) JM Fumeaux (Uruguay) Mateo Núñez	1	0
(Uruguay) I Carou (Italy) L Darderi	6	6
(Slovenia) T Lipovšek Puches (Argentina) JI Londero	4	4
Alt	(Argentina) F Comesaña (Argentina) M Navone	6	6

Quarterfinals
1	(Brazil) R Matos (Brazil) F Meligeni Alves	6	6
(Argentina) H Casanova (Argentina) S Rodríguez Taverna	4	1
4	(Argentina) F Cerúndolo (Uruguay) M Cuevas	1	6	[12]
(Argentina) A Collarini (Argentina) G Durán	6	2	[10]
(Argentina) G Andreozzi (Argentina) JP Ficovich	1	1
3	(Argentina) TM Etcheverry (Argentina) R Olivo	6	6
(Uruguay) I Carou (Italy) L Darderi	6	5	[10]
Alt	(Argentina) F Comesaña (Argentina) M Navone	2	7	[8]

Semifinals
1	(Brazil) R Matos (Brazil) F Meligeni Alves	6	6
4	(Argentina) F Cerúndolo (Uruguay) M Cuevas	2	3
3	(Argentina) TM Etcheverry (Argentina) R Olivo
(Uruguay) I Carou (Italy) L Darderi	w/o

Final
1	(Brazil) R Matos (Brazil) F Meligeni Alves	6	6
(Uruguay) I Carou (Italy) L Darderi	4	4
