= 2022 Rakuten Japan Open Tennis Championships – Doubles =

Doubles
- 2022 Rakuten Japan Open Tennis Championships

Final
- Champions: (United States) Mackenzie McDonald (Brazil) Marcelo Melo
- Runners-up: (Brazil) Rafael Matos (Spain) David Vega Hernández
- Score: 6–4, 3–6, [10–4]

Details
- Draw: 16 (1Q / 2WC)
- Seeds: 4

Events
Singles	Doubles
- Japan Open

Mackenzie McDonald and Marcelo Melo defeated Rafael Matos and David Vega Hernández in the final, 6–4, 3–6, [10–4] to win the doubles tennis title at the 2022 Japan Open.

Nicolas Mahut and Édouard Roger-Vasselin were the reigning champions from when the event was last held in 2019, but did not participate this year.

== Seeds ==
1. (Australia) Thanasi Kokkinakis / (Australia) Nick Kyrgios (semifinals, withdrew)
2. (Australia) Matthew Ebden / (Australia) Max Purcell (quarterfinals)
3. (Brazil) Rafael Matos / (Spain) David Vega Hernández (final)
4. (United Kingdom) Dan Evans / (Australia) John Peers (quarterfinals)

== Draw ==
Key

- Q = Qualifier
- WC = Wild card
- LL = Lucky loser
- Alt = Alternate
- ITF = ITF entry
- PR = Protected ranking
- SR = Special ranking
- SE = Special exempt
- JE = Junior exempt
- JR = Junior Accelerator Programme entrant
- CO = College Accelerator Programme entrant
- NG = Next Gen Accelerator Program entrant
- w/o = Walkover
- r = Retired
- d = Defaulted

=== Draw ===
First round
1	(Australia) T Kokkinakis (Australia) N Kyrgios	6	6
WC	(Japan) Y Nishioka (Japan) K Uchida	1	2
(Ecuador) G Escobar (Chile) N Jarry	6	3	[8]
(Spain) P Martínez (Spain) B Zapata Miralles	3	6	[10]
4	(United Kingdom) D Evans (Australia) J Peers	6	7^{7}
(Sweden) A Göransson (Japan) B McLachlan	2	6^{5}
(United States) M McDonald (Brazil) M Melo	6	6
(Australia) A de Minaur (United States) F Tiafoe	3	1
(United States) B Nakashima (United States) H Reese	4	6	[10]
(France) S Doumbia (France) F Reboul	6	1	[2]
(Mexico) H Hach Verdugo (Serbia) M Kecmanović	6^{5}	4
3	(Brazil) R Matos (Spain) D Vega Hernández	7^{7}	6
WC	(Japan) T Matsui (Japan) K Uesugi	6	6^{5}	[8]
Q	(Belgium) S Gillé (Belgium) J Vliegen	3	7^{7}	[10]
(Australia) A Popyrin (India) R Ramanathan	2	6^{4}
2	(Australia) M Ebden (Australia) M Purcell	6	7^{7}

Quarterfinals
1	(Australia) T Kokkinakis (Australia) N Kyrgios	7	6
(Spain) P Martínez (Spain) B Zapata Miralles	5	4
4	(United Kingdom) D Evans (Australia) J Peers	2	7^{7}	[6]
(United States) M McDonald (Brazil) M Melo	6	6^{5}	[10]
(United States) B Nakashima (United States) H Reese	3	6^{4}
3	(Brazil) R Matos (Spain) D Vega Hernández	6	7^{7}
Q	(Belgium) S Gillé (Belgium) J Vliegen	6	5	[10]
2	(Australia) M Ebden (Australia) M Purcell	3	7	[8]

Semifinals
1	(Australia) T Kokkinakis (Australia) N Kyrgios
(United States) M McDonald (Brazil) M Melo	w/o
3	(Brazil) R Matos (Spain) D Vega Hernández	7	6
Q	(Belgium) S Gillé (Belgium) J Vliegen	5	4

Final
(United States) M McDonald (Brazil) M Melo	6	3	[10]
3	(Brazil) R Matos (Spain) D Vega Hernández	4	6	[4]

== Qualifying ==
=== Seeds ===
1. (Belgium) Sander Gillé / (Belgium) Joran Vliegen (qualified)
2. (United States) Max Schnur / (Australia) John-Patrick Smith (qualifying competition)

=== Qualifiers ===
1. (Belgium) Sander Gillé / (Belgium) Joran Vliegen

=== Qualifying draw ===
First round
1	(Belgium) Sander Gillé (Belgium) Joran Vliegen	6	6
WC	(Japan) Shintaro Mochizuki (Japan) Sho Shimabukuro	1	4
(Tunisia) Aziz Dougaz (Sweden) Elias Ymer	4	1
2	(United States) Max Schnur (Australia) John-Patrick Smith	6	6

Qualifying competition
1	(Belgium) Sander Gillé (Belgium) Joran Vliegen	6	2	[10]
2	(United States) Max Schnur (Australia) John-Patrick Smith	4	6	[5]
