= 2022 Rakuten Japan Open Tennis Championships =

- Date: 3–9 October
- Edition: 47th
- Category: ATP Tour 500
- Draw: 32S/16D
- Prize money: $1,953,285
- Surface: Hard / outdoor
- Location: Tokyo, Japan
- Venue: Ariake Coliseum

Champions

Singles
- (United States) Taylor Fritz

Doubles
- (United States) Mackenzie McDonald / (Brazil) Marcelo Melo
- Japan Open

The 2022 Rakuten Japan Open Tennis Championships was a men's tennis tournament played on outdoor hardcourts. It was the 47th edition of the Japan Open, and part of the ATP Tour 500 series of the 2022 ATP Tour. It was held at the Ariake Coliseum in Tokyo, Japan, from 3–9 October 2022. It was the first event since 2019, with the 2020 and 2021 events cancelled due to the COVID-19 pandemic. Third-seeded Taylor Fritz won the singles title.

== Finals ==
=== Singles ===
- (United States) Taylor Fritz defeated (United States) Frances Tiafoe, 7–6^{(7–3)}, 7–6^{(7–2)}

=== Doubles ===
- (United States) Mackenzie McDonald / (Brazil) Marcelo Melo defeated (Brazil) Rafael Matos / (Spain) David Vega Hernández, 6–4, 3–6, [10–4]

== Singles main-draw entrants ==
=== Seeds ===
Country	Player	Rank^{1}	Seed
NOR	Casper Ruud	2	1
~~GBR~~	~~Cameron Norrie~~	~~8~~	~~2~~
USA	Taylor Fritz	12	3
USA	Frances Tiafoe	19	4
AUS	Nick Kyrgios	20	5
AUS	Alex de Minaur	22	6
CAN	Denis Shapovalov	24	7
GBR	Dan Evans	25	8
CRO	Borna Ćorić	26	9

- ^{1} Rankings are as of September 26, 2022.

=== Other entrants ===
The following players received wildcards into the singles main draw:

- (Japan) Kaichi Uchida
- (Japan) Yasutaka Uchiyama
- (Japan) Yosuke Watanuki

The following players received entry from the qualifying draw:

- (Japan) Rio Noguchi
- (India) Ramkumar Ramanathan
- (Japan) Sho Shimabukuro
- (Japan) Yuta Shimizu

The following player received entry as a lucky loser:

- (Japan) Hiroki Moriya

=== Withdrawals ===
- (United States) Jenson Brooksby → replaced by (Chinese Taipei) Tseng Chun-hsin
- (United States) Marcos Giron → replaced by (Poland) Kamil Majchrzak
- (United Kingdom) Cameron Norrie→ replaced by (Japan) Hiroki Moriya
- (Portugal) João Sousa → replaced by (United States) Steve Johnson
- (Germany) Alexander Zverev → replaced by (Australia) Alexei Popyrin

== Doubles main-draw entrants ==
=== Seeds ===
Country	Player	Country	Player	Rank^{1}	Seed
AUS	Thanasi Kokkinakis	AUS	Nick Kyrgios	34	1
AUS	Matthew Ebden	AUS	Max Purcell	69	2
BRA	Rafael Matos	ESP	David Vega Hernández	74	3
GBR	Dan Evans	AUS	John Peers	108	4

- Rankings are as of September 26, 2022.

=== Other entrants ===
The following pairs received wildcards into the doubles main draw:

- (Japan) Toshihide Matsui / (Japan) Kaito Uesugi
- (Japan) Yoshihito Nishioka / (Japan) Kaichi Uchida

The following pair received entry from the qualifying draw:

- (Belgium) Sander Gillé / (Belgium) Joran Vliegen

=== Withdrawals ===
- (Japan) Taro Daniel / (United States) Marcos Giron → replaced by (United States) Brandon Nakashima / (United States) Hunter Reese
- (Serbia) Miomir Kecmanović / (Portugal) João Sousa → replaced by (Mexico) Hans Hach Verdugo / (Serbia) Miomir Kecmanović
- (Spain) Pedro Martínez / (United Kingdom) Cameron Norrie → replaced by (Spain) Pedro Martínez / (Spain) Bernabé Zapata Miralles
