= 2021 Córdoba Open – Singles =

Singles
- 2021 Córdoba Open

Final
- Champion: (Argentina) Juan Manuel Cerúndolo
- Runner-up: (Spain) Albert Ramos Viñolas
- Score: 6–0, 2–6, 6–2

Details
- Draw: 28 (4 Q / 3 WC )
- Seeds: 8

Events
Singles	Doubles
- Córdoba Open

Cristian Garín was the defending champion, but chose not to defend his title.

Juan Manuel Cerúndolo won the title, defeating Albert Ramos Viñolas in the final 6–0, 2–6, 6–2. Cerúndolo, who started the week ranked 335th and went through qualifying, became the first player to win a tournament on his ATP Tour debut since Santiago Ventura in 2004.

== Seeds ==
The top four seeds received a bye into the second round.

1. (Argentina) Diego Schwartzman (quarterfinals)
2. (France) Benoît Paire (quarterfinals)
3. (Serbia) Miomir Kecmanović (second round)
4. (Argentina) Guido Pella (withdrew)
5. (Spain) Albert Ramos Viñolas (final)
6. (Germany) Dominik Koepfer (first round)
7. (Brazil) Thiago Monteiro (quarterfinals)
8. (Argentina) Federico Delbonis (second round)

== Draw ==
Key

- Q = Qualifier
- WC = Wild card
- LL = Lucky loser
- Alt = Alternate
- ITF = ITF entry
- PR = Protected ranking
- SR = Special ranking
- SE = Special exempt
- JE = Junior exempt
- JR = Junior Accelerator Programme entrant
- CO = College Accelerator Programme entrant
- NG = Next Gen Accelerator Program entrant
- w/o = Walkover
- r = Retired
- d = Defaulted

=== Finals ===
Semifinals
5	(Spain) Albert Ramos Viñolas	7	5	6
Q	(Argentina) Facundo Bagnis	5	7	3
Q	(Argentina) Juan Manuel Cerúndolo	6	4	6
(Argentina) Federico Coria	4	6	2

Final
5	(Spain) Albert Ramos Viñolas	0	6	2
Q	(Argentina) Juan Manuel Cerúndolo	6	2	6

=== Top half ===
First round
(Bolivia) H Dellien	2	6	1
(Italy) M Cecchinato	6	4	6
Q	(Argentina) TM Etcheverry	6	7^{7}
(Slovakia) A Martin	3	6^{4}
(Argentina) JI Londero	6	2	2
5	(Spain) A Ramos Viñolas	4	6	6
(Colombia) DE Galán	2	6	3
(Slovakia) J Kovalík	6	1	6
Q	(Argentina) F Bagnis	6	6
WC	(Argentina) N Kicker	1	4
(Portugal) P Sousa	4	4
8	(Argentina) F Delbonis	6	6

Second round
1	(Argentina) D Schwartzman	6	6
(Italy) M Cecchinato	2	2
Q	(Argentina) TM Etcheverry	6	6^{5}	5
5	(Spain) A Ramos Viñolas	2	7^{7}	7
Q	(Chile) MT Barrios Vera	6	2	3
(Slovakia) J Kovalík	4	6	6
Q	(Argentina) F Bagnis	6	7
8	(Argentina) F Delbonis	4	5

Quarterfinals
1	(Argentina) D Schwartzman	1	6	3
5	(Spain) A Ramos Viñolas	6	4	6
(Slovakia) J Kovalík	1	2
Q	(Argentina) F Bagnis	6	6

Semifinals
5	(Spain) A Ramos Viñolas	7	5	6
Q	(Argentina) F Bagnis	5	7	3

=== Bottom half ===
First round
7	(Brazil) T Monteiro	6	6
LL	(Brazil) J Menezes	3	3
(Spain) R Carballés Baena	6	6
(Portugal) J Sousa	3	1
Q	(Argentina) JM Cerúndolo	7	7^{7}
(Brazil) T Seyboth Wild	5	6^{3}
6	(Germany) D Koepfer	1	4
(Argentina) F Coria	6	6
WC	(Argentina) F Cerúndolo	6^{3}	6	6
(Italy) G Mager	7^{7}	1	4
(Spain) J Munar	7	6^{5}	4
WC	(Chile) N Jarry	5	7^{7}	6

Second round
7	(Brazil) T Monteiro	6	6
(Spain) R Carballés Baena	3	4
Q	(Argentina) JM Cerúndolo	6^{3}	7	6
3	(Serbia) M Kecmanović	7^{7}	5	2
(Argentina) F Coria	1	6	6
WC	(Argentina) F Cerúndolo	6	2	4
WC	(Chile) N Jarry	2	4
2	(France) B Paire	6	6

Quarterfinals
7	(Brazil) T Monteiro	2	6	3
Q	(Argentina) JM Cerúndolo	6	2	6
(Argentina) F Coria	6	6
2	(France) B Paire	3	2

Semifinals
Q	(Argentina) JM Cerúndolo	6	4	6
(Argentina) F Coria	4	6	2

== Qualifying ==
=== Seeds ===
1. (Argentina) Facundo Bagnis (qualified)
2. (Argentina) Leonardo Mayer (first round)
3. (India) Sumit Nagal (first round)
4. (Peru) Juan Pablo Varillas (second round)
5. (Ecuador) Emilio Gómez (first round)
6. (Argentina) Guido Andreozzi (first round)
7. (Portugal) João Domingues (first round)
8. (Spain) Mario Vilella Martínez (first round)

=== Qualifiers ===
1. (Argentina) Facundo Bagnis
2. (Argentina) Tomás Martín Etcheverry
3. (Chile) Marcelo Tomás Barrios Vera
4. (Argentina) Juan Manuel Cerúndolo

=== Lucky loser ===
1. (Brazil) João Menezes

=== Qualifying draw ===
==== First qualifier ====
First round
1	(Argentina) Facundo Bagnis	6	4	6
(Argentina) Thiago Agustín Tirante	3	6	4
(Argentina) Hernán Casanova	2	6^{3}
(Argentina) Andrea Collarini	6	7^{7}
(Brazil) Guilherme Clezar	4	4
(Argentina) Renzo Olivo	6	6
(Brazil) Pedro Sakamoto	3	6	7^{7}
5	(Ecuador) Emilio Gómez	6	1	6^{5}

Second round
1	(Argentina) Facundo Bagnis	7^{7}	6
(Argentina) Andrea Collarini	6^{5}	3
(Argentina) Renzo Olivo	2	5
(Brazil) Pedro Sakamoto	6	7

Qualifying competition
1	(Argentina) Facundo Bagnis	6	6
(Brazil) Pedro Sakamoto	2	4

==== Second qualifier ====
First round
2	(Argentina) Leonardo Mayer	6^{1}	7^{11}	3
(Argentina) Tomás Martín Etcheverry	7^{7}	6^{9}	6
(Argentina) Facundo Mena	1	0^{r}
(Sweden) Christian Lindell	6	0
(United States) Ernesto Escobedo	7^{7}	4	6
(Slovakia) Lukáš Klein	6^{4}	6	1
(Brazil) Felipe Meligeni Alves	6	6
7	(Portugal) João Domingues	2	2

Second round
(Argentina) Tomás Martín Etcheverry	7	6
(Sweden) Christian Lindell	5	2
(United States) Ernesto Escobedo	6	6
(Brazil) Felipe Meligeni Alves	4	1

Qualifying competition
(Argentina) Tomás Martín Etcheverry	7	7
(United States) Ernesto Escobedo	5	5

==== Third qualifier ====
First round
3	(India) Sumit Nagal	4	6	3
(Argentina) Facundo Díaz Acosta	6	2	6
WC	(Argentina) Mariano Kestelboim	0	4
(Argentina) Camilo Ugo Carabelli	6	6
(Chile) Marcelo Tomás Barrios Vera	6	6
(Peru) Nicolás Álvarez	1	2
(Argentina) Agustín Velotti	6	6
8	(Spain) Mario Vilella Martínez	3	4

Second round
(Argentina) Facundo Díaz Acosta	6	3	2
(Argentina) Camilo Ugo Carabelli	4	6	6
(Chile) Marcelo Tomás Barrios Vera	6	6
(Argentina) Agustín Velotti	3	4

Qualifying competition
(Argentina) Camilo Ugo Carabelli	6^{3}	6^{4}
(Chile) Marcelo Tomás Barrios Vera	7^{7}	7^{7}

==== Fourth qualifier ====
First round
4	(Peru) Juan Pablo Varillas	6^{3}	6	6
WC	(Argentina) Matías Franco Descotte	7^{7}	0	0
(Argentina) Juan Manuel Cerúndolo	6	6
WC	(Argentina) Fermín Tenti	0	4
(Brazil) João Menezes	6	7^{7}
WC	(Argentina) Guido Iván Justo	3	6^{4}
(Spain) Carlos Gómez-Herrera	6	7
6	(Argentina) Guido Andreozzi	3	5

Second round
4	(Peru) Juan Pablo Varillas	6^{7}	3
(Argentina) Juan Manuel Cerúndolo	7^{9}	6
(Brazil) João Menezes	6	6
(Spain) Carlos Gómez-Herrera	1	1

Qualifying competition
(Argentina) Juan Manuel Cerúndolo	6	6
(Brazil) João Menezes	4	4
