= Rafael Matos =

Brazilian tennis player (born 1996)

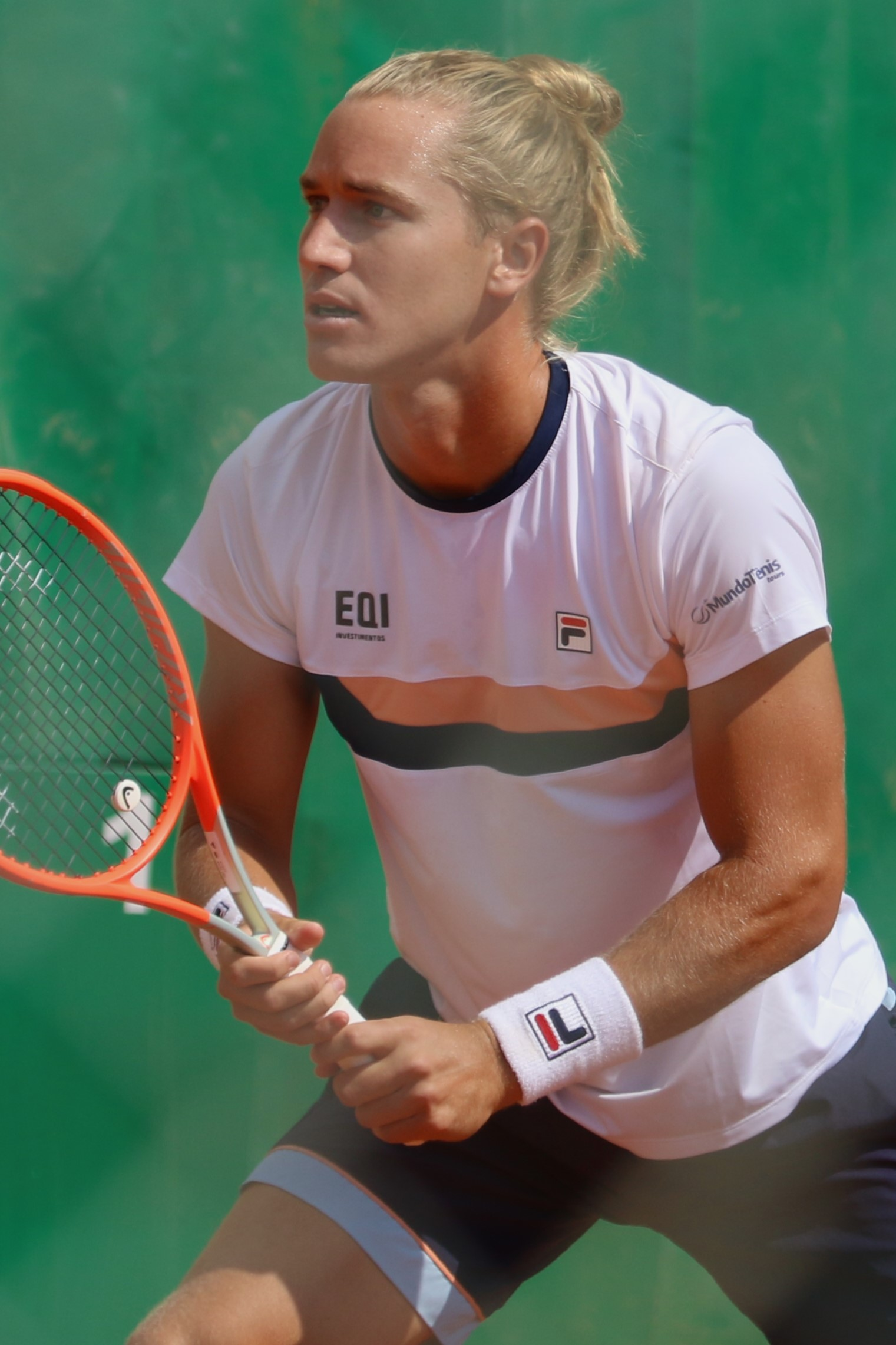
- Matos in 2023
- Full name: Rafael Fabris de Matos
- Country (sports): Brazil
- Residence: Porto Alegre, Brazil
- Born: 6 January 1996 (age 30) Porto Alegre, Brazil
- Height: 1.83 m (6 ft 0 in)
- Turned pro: 2011
- Plays: Left-handed (two-handed backhand)
- Coach: Franco Ferreiro, Luiz Peniza
- Prize money: US $2,032,521

Singles
- Career record: 0–0
- Career titles: 0
- Highest ranking: No. 440 (21 May 2018)

Doubles
- Career record: 171–124
- Career titles: 15
- Highest ranking: No. 15 (19 October 2026)
- Current ranking: No. 17 (2 November 2026)

Grand Slam doubles results
- Australian Open: QF (2026)
- French Open: QF (2022)
- Wimbledon: QF (2025)
- US Open: 2R (2023, 2024, 2025)

Mixed doubles
- Career titles: 1

Grand Slam mixed doubles results
- Australian Open: W (2023)
- French Open: QF (2023, 2026)
- Wimbledon: 1R (2022, 2023, 2024)
- US Open: 1R (2022, 2024)
- Last updated on: 20 November 2026.

Rafael Fabris de Matos (born 6 January 1996) is a Brazilian professional tennis player who specializes in doubles. He has a career-high ATP doubles ranking of world No. 15 achieved on 19 October 2026 and a singles ranking of world No. 440 achieved on 21 May 2018. He has won fifteen ATP Tour doubles titles.

Matos' most notable result is a Grand Slam mixed doubles title at the 2023 Australian Open, playing with compatriot Luisa Stefani, where they became the first Brazilian pair to win a Major. He also earned two Masters 1000 titles at the 2026 Canadian Open and at the 2026 Cincinnati Open, with compatriot Orlando Luz.

Matos represents Brazil at the Davis Cup.

== Career ==
=== 2019–20: ATP debut ===
Matos made his ATP main draw debut at the 2019 Brasil Open in the doubles draw partnering Igor Marcondes.

At the 2020 Rio Open, Matos alongside Orlando Luz defeated the 2019 Wimbledon and 2019 US Open champions, and ATP doubles World No. 1, Juan Sebastián Cabal and Robert Farah 6–1, 4–6, [10–8].

=== 2021–22: Major debut & first win & quarterfinal, Six titles & top 30 debut ===
In February 2021, Matos won his first ATP Tour doubles title alongside Felipe Meligeni Alves at the ATP 250 Córdoba Open defeating Romain Arneodo and Benoît Paire. He reached the top 100 in doubles on 3 May 2021 at World No. 99.

Matos made his Grand Slam debut at the 2021 Wimbledon Championships with compatriot Thiago Monteiro where they reached the second round.

In February 2022, he won his second ATP 250 doubles title at the 2022 Chile Open alongside Meligeni Alves.

In April 2022, Matos won his third ATP 250 doubles title at the 2022 Grand Prix Hassan II alongside Spaniard David Vega Hernández. At the 2022 BMW Open, he reached his second final with Vega Hernández and fifth overall.

At the 2022 French Open on his debut at this Major, the pair reached the third round with a win over Łukasz Kubot and Édouard Roger-Vasselin but not before defeating 13th seeded pair of Santiago González and Andrés Molteni. They reached the quarterfinals where they lost to 12th seeded pair of Marcelo Arévalo and Jean-Julien Rojer. As a result, he made his debut in the top 50 in the rankings at world No. 43 on 6 June 2022.

Matos reached the top 30 on 31 October 2022 following a fifth title for the season at the 2022 Sofia Open and a final showing at the ATP 500 2022 Rakuten Japan Open Tennis Championships with Vega Hernández. He ended 2022 with six ATP career titles, and having reached world No. 27 in the doubles rankings on 14 November 2022.

=== 2023: Historic Major mixed doubles title ===
Playing in mixed doubles of the 2023 Australian Open with fellow Brazilian Luisa Stefani, they won the first Grand Slam title for Brazil, an unprecedented feat both as a 100% Brazilian duo and individually.

Throughout 2023, Matos' best results in doubles were: a third round at Roland Garros and runner-up at the ATP 250 in Bastad and Chengdu with Francisco Cabral, a semifinal at the ATP 250 in Córdoba with Vega Hernández, and quarterfinals at the ATP 500 in Acapulco, Barcelona and Halle.

At the 2023 Wimbledon, Matos competed in the mixed doubles draw, resuming the partnership with Luisa Stefani. In their opening match against Andrea Vavassori and Liudmila Samsonova, they were defeated 2–1 in sets.

=== 2024: First ATP 500 title ===
At the beginning of the season, Matos started a new partnership with Colombian player Nicolás Barrientos, which had already been announced at the end of 2023. In their first competition, the Brisbane International, the duo advanced to the second round (round of 16), where they faced the No. 2 seeds, Dutch player Jean-Julien Rojer and British player Lloyd Glasspool, being eliminated in straight sets.

In the partnership’s second tournament, the Adelaide International, Matos and Barrientos defeated the No. 8 seeds, French duo Edouard Roger-Vasselin and Nicolas Mahut, in straight sets to reach the quarterfinals, where they faced the No. 2 seeds, Indian player Rohan Bopanna and Australian player Matthew Ebden. In this match, they were defeated 2–1 in sets and eliminated from the tournament.

After that, Rafael headed straight to Melbourne to compete in the Australian Open, again partnering with Barrientos. Upon arriving in Melbourne, Matos received news that the Australian Open organizers had granted a wild card to Luisa Stefani and him, giving them the opportunity to defend their mixed doubles title won in 2023, even though Matos’s ranking was not high enough to compete alongside Stefani.

In the mixed doubles draw, Stefani and Matos faced British players Joe Salisbury—who partnered with Stefani at the 2023 US Open—and Heather Watson in the first round but were defeated in straight sets, ending their participation in the 2024 Australian Open without successfully defending their mixed doubles title.

Matos partnership with Nicolás Barrientos started to produce good results. At the ATP 250 in Buenos Aires, they reached the semifinals. In the following ATP 500 tournament in Rio de Janeiro, they won their biggest title, defeating strong pairs such as Krawietz/Putz, Bolelli/Vavassori and Erler/Miedler in the final. By doing so, Matos became the first Brazilian in the tournament’s ten-year history to win a trophy, in either singles or doubles.

In July, Matos won his ninth ATP title with Orlando Luz at the 2024 Swedish Open.

=== 2025: Rio title defense with Melo ===
Matos partnered with Marcelo Melo throughout the year. In February, they were runners-up at the ATP 250 tournament in Buenos Aires.

Matos won his tenth title overall and second at his home tournament, the 2025 Rio Open, where he was the defending champion, with compatriot Marcelo Melo. Matos became the fourth man to win multiple Rio doubles titles and the first to successfully defend the title.

Matos reached the quarterfinals of the Monte Carlo Masters 1000 playing with Joran Vliegen. At Wimbledon, he reached the quarterfinals with Melo. They were also champions of the Winston-Salem ATP 250.

=== 2026: Successive Masters 1000 titles, top 20 ===
In early 2026, he reunited in a partnership with Orlando Luz and they reached the quarterfinals of the Australian Open, won the ATP 250 tournaments in Buenos Aires and in Santiago, finished as runners-up at the ATP 250 events in Houston and in Estoril, and were semifinalists at the ATP 500 in Munich.

In August, Matos and Luz won their first Masters 1000-level title at the Canadian Open, defeating third seeds Marcelo Arévalo and Mate Pavić in the final. Subsequently, they won another Masters 1000 title—this time in Cincinnati—with Matos climbing from the world's top 40 in the doubles rankings to the top 20 on 24 August 2026.

== Performance timeline ==
Key
W	F	SF	QF	#R	RR	Q#	P#	DNQ	A	Z#	PO	G	S	B	NMS	NTI	P	NH

(W) winner; (F) finalist; (SF) semifinalist; (QF) quarterfinalist; (#R) rounds 4, 3, 2, 1; (RR) round-robin stage; (Q#) qualification round; (P#) preliminary round; (DNQ) did not qualify; (A) absent; (Z#) Davis/Fed Cup Zonal Group (with number indication) or (PO) play-off; (G) gold, (S) silver or (B) bronze Olympic/Paralympic medal; (NMS) not a Masters tournament; (NTI) not a Tier I tournament; (P) postponed; (NH) not held; (SR) strike rate (events won / competed); (W–L) win–loss record.
To avoid confusion and double counting, these charts are updated at the conclusion of a tournament or when the player's participation has ended.

=== Doubles ===
Current through the 2026 Canadian Open.

Tournament	2021	2022	2023	2024	2025	SR	W–L
Grand Slam tournaments
Australian Open	A	1R	1R	2R	1R	0 / 4	1–4
French Open	A	QF	3R	2R	1R	0 / 4	6–4
Wimbledon	2R	3R	2R	3R	QF	0 / 5	9–5
US Open	A	1R	2R	2R	2R	0 / 4	3–4
Win–loss	1–1	5–4	4–4	5–4	4–4	0 / 17	19–17
ATP Tour Masters 1000
Indian Wells Masters	A	A	1R	A	A	0 / 1	0–1
Miami Open	A	A	2R	A	1R	0 / 2	1–2
Monte-Carlo Masters	A	A	1R	A	QF	0 / 2	1–2
Madrid Open	A	A	1R	A	1R	0 / 2	0–2
Italian Open	A	A	A	2R	1R	0 / 2	1–2
Canadian Open	A	A	A	A	A	0 / 0	0–0
Cincinnati Masters	A	1R	A	A	A	0 / 1	0–1
Shanghai Masters	NH		1R	1R	1R	0 / 3	0–3
Paris Masters	A	2R	A	A	A	0 / 1	0–1
Win–loss	0–0	0–2	1–5	1–2	1–5	0 / 14	3–14
Career statistics
	2021	2022	2023	2024	2025	Career	
Titles	1	5	0	3	2	11	
Finals	2	7	2	4	3	18	
Year-end ranking	67	27	59	36	42		

== Grand Slam tournaments finals ==
=== Mixed doubles: 1 (title) ===
Result	Year	Tournament	Surface	Partner	Opponents	Score
Win	2023	Australian Open	Hard	(Brazil) Luisa Stefani	(India) Sania Mirza (India) Rohan Bopanna	7–6^{(7–2)}, 6–2

== Other significant finals ==
=== ATP Masters 1000 finals ===
==== Doubles: (2 titles) ====
Result	Year	Tournament	Surface	Partner	Opponents	Score
Win	2026	Canadian Open	Hard	(Brazil) Orlando Luz	(El Salvador) Marcelo Arévalo (Croatia) Mate Pavić	5−7, 6−4, [10−6]
Win	2026	Cincinnati Open	Hard	(Brazil) Orlando Luz	(Germany) Constantin Frantzen (Netherlands) Robin Haase	6–4, 3–6, [10–7]

== ATP Tour finals ==
=== Doubles: 24 (15 titles, 9 runner-ups) ===
Legend Grand Slam (–) ATP 1000 (2–0) ATP 500 (2–2) ATP 250 (11–7)	Finals by surface Hard (4–3) Clay (9–6) Grass (2–0)	Finals by setting Outdoor (14–9) Indoor (1–0)

Result	W–L	Date	Tournament	Tier	Surface	Partner	Opponents	Score
Win	1–0	Feb 2021	Córdoba Open, Argentina	ATP 250	Clay	(Brazil) Felipe Meligeni Alves	(Monaco) Romain Arneodo (France) Benoît Paire	6–4, 6–1
Loss	1–1	May 2021	Belgrade Open, Serbia	ATP 250	Clay	(Sweden) Andre Goransson	(Israel) Jonathan Erlich (Belarus) Andrei Vasilevski	4–6, 1–6
Win	2–1	Feb 2022	Chile Open, Chile	ATP 250	Clay	(Brazil) Felipe Meligeni Alves	(Sweden) Andre Goransson (United States) Nathaniel Lammons	7–6^{(10–8)}, 7–6^{(7–3)}
Win	3–1	Apr 2022	Grand Prix Hassan II, Morocco	ATP 250	Clay	(Spain) David Vega Hernández	(Italy) Andrea Vavassori (Poland) Jan Zieliński	6–1, 7–5
Loss	3–2	May 2022	Bavarian Championships, Germany	ATP 250	Clay	(Spain) David Vega Hernández	(Germany) Kevin Krawietz (Germany) Andreas Mies	6–4, 4–6, [7–10]
Win	4–2	Jun 2022	Mallorca Championships, Spain	ATP 250	Grass	(Spain) David Vega Hernández	(Uruguay) Ariel Behar (Ecuador) Gonzalo Escobar	7–6^{(7–5)}, 6–7^{(6–8)}, [10–1]
Win	5–2	Jul 2022	Swedish Open, Sweden	ATP 250	Clay	(Spain) David Vega Hernández	(Italy) Simone Bolelli (Italy) Fabio Fognini	6–4, 3–6, [13–11]
Win	6–2	Oct 2022	Sofia Open, Bulgaria	ATP 250	Hard (i)	(Spain) David Vega Hernández	(Germany) Fabian Fallert (Germany) Oscar Otte	3–6, 7–5, [10–8]
Loss	6–3	Oct 2022	Japan Open, Japan	ATP 500	Hard	(Spain) David Vega Hernández	(United States) Mackenzie McDonald (Brazil) Marcelo Melo	4–6, 6–3, [4–10]
Loss	6–4	Jul 2023	Swedish Open, Sweden	ATP 250	Clay	(Portugal) Francisco Cabral	(Ecuador) Gonzalo Escobar (Kazakhstan) Aleksandr Nedovyesov	2–6, 2–6
Loss	6–5	Sep 2023	Chengdu Open, China	ATP 250	Hard	(Portugal) Francisco Cabral	(France) Sadio Doumbia (France) Fabien Reboul	6–4, 5–7, [7–10]
Win	7–5	Feb 2024	Rio Open, Brazil	ATP 500	Clay	(Colombia) Nicolás Barrientos	(Austria) Alexander Erler (Austria) Lucas Miedler	6–4, 6–3
Win	8–5	Jun 2024	Stuttgart Open, Germany	ATP 250	Grass	(Brazil) Marcelo Melo	(United States) Robert Galloway (United Kingdom) Julian Cash	3–6, 6–3, [10–8]
Win	9–5	Jul 2024	Swedish Open, Sweden (2)	ATP 250	Clay	(Brazil) Orlando Luz	(France) Manuel Guinard (France) Grégoire Jacq	7–5, 6–4
Loss	9–6	Aug 2024	Washington Open, US	ATP 500	Hard	(Brazil) Marcelo Melo	(United States) Nathaniel Lammons (United States) Jackson Withrow	5–7, 3–6
Loss	9–7	Feb 2025	Argentina Open, Argentina	ATP 250	Clay	(Brazil) Marcelo Melo	(Argentina) Guido Andreozzi (France) Théo Arribagé	5–7, 6–4, [7–10]
Win	10–7	Feb 2025	Rio Open, Brazil (2)	ATP 500	Clay	(Brazil) Marcelo Melo	(Spain) Jaume Munar (Spain) Pedro Martínez	6–2, 7–5
Win	11–7	Aug 2025	Winston-Salem Open, US	ATP 250	Hard	(Brazil) Marcelo Melo	(Portugal) Francisco Cabral (Austria) Lucas Miedler	4–6, 6–4, [10–8]
Win	12–7	Feb 2026	Argentina Open, Argentina	ATP 250	Clay	(Brazil) Orlando Luz	(Argentina) Andrea Collarini (Argentina) Nicolás Kicker	7–5, 6–3
Win	13–7	Feb 2026	Chile Open, Chile (2)	ATP 250	Clay	(Brazil) Orlando Luz	(Uruguay) Ariel Behar (Australia) Matthew Romios	6–4, 6–3
Loss	13–8	Apr 2026	U.S. Men's Clay Court Championships, US	ATP 250	Clay	(Brazil) Orlando Luz	(Ecuador) Andrés Andrade (United States) Ben Shelton	6–4, 3–6, [6–10]
Loss	13–9	Jul 2026	Estoril Open, Portugal	ATP 250	Clay	(Brazil) Orlando Luz	(France) Titouan Droguet (France) Kyrian Jacquet	6–7^{(2–7)}, 7–6^{(7–4)}, [9–11]
Win	14–9	Aug 2026	Canadian Open, Canada	ATP 1000	Hard	(Brazil) Orlando Luz	(El Salvador) Marcelo Arévalo (Croatia) Mate Pavić	5−7, 6−4, [10−6]
Win	15–9	Aug 2026	Cincinnati Open, US	ATP 1000	Hard	(Brazil) Orlando Luz	(Germany) Constantin Frantzen (Netherlands) Robin Haase	6–4, 3–6, [10–7]

== ATP Challenger and ITF Tour finals ==
=== Singles: 9 (4 titles, 5 runner-ups) ===
Legend ATP Challenger (–) ITF Futures/WTT (4–5)	Finals by surface Hard (–) Clay (4–5)

Result	W–L	Date	Tournament	Tier	Surface	Opponent	Score
Loss	0–1	Nov 2014	Brazil F15, Foz do Iguaçu	Futures	Clay	(Brazil) Fabrício Neis	3–6, 5–7
Win	1–1	May 2017	Spain F14, Vic	Futures	Clay	(Argentina) Pedro Cachín	4–6, 6–0, 1–0 ret.
Loss	1–2	Aug 2017	Spain F25, Vigo	Futures	Clay	(Spain) Marc Giner	2–6, 6–4, 6–7^{(6–8)}
Win	2–2	Nov 2017	Brazil F2, Santos	Futures	Clay	(Brazil) Wilson Leite	6–2, 3–6, 6–3
Win	3–2	May 2018	Brazil F2, São Paulo	Futures	Clay	(Argentina) Gonzalo Villanueva	6–1, 6–3
Win	4–2	May 2019	M15 Tabarka, Tunisia	WTT	Clay	(Brazil) Orlando Luz	7–5, 7–5
Loss	4–3	May 2019	M15 Valldoreix, Spain	WTT	Clay	(Brazil) Orlando Luz	3–6, 4–6
Loss	4–4	Jun 2019	M15 São José do Rio Preto, Brazil	WTT	Clay	(Argentina) Juan Pablo Ficovich	4–6, 2–6
Loss	4–5	Oct 2019	M15 São Paulo, Brazil	WTT	Clay	(Chile) Bastián Malla	3–6, 2–6

=== Doubles: 22 (12–10) ===
Legend ATP Challenger (12–10) ITF Futures/WTT (25+)	Finals by surface Hard (1–3) Clay (11–7)

Result	W–L	Date	Tournament	Tier	Surface	Partner	Opponents	Score
Win	1–0	Oct 2019	Campinas, Brazil	Challenger	Clay	(Brazil) Orlando Luz	(Mexico) Miguel Ángel Reyes-Varela (Brazil) Fernando Romboli	6–7^{(2–7)}, 6–4, [10–8]
Win	2–0	Jan 2020	Punta del Este, Uruguay	Challenger	Clay	(Brazil) Orlando Luz	(Argentina) Juan Manuel Cerúndolo (Argentina) Thiago Agustín Tirante	6–4, 6–2
Loss	2–1	Mar 2020	Monterrey, Mexico	Challenger	Hard	(Brazil) Orlando Luz	(Poland) Karol Drzewiecki (Portugal) Gonçalo Oliveira	7–6^{(7–5)}, 4–6, [9–11]
Win	3–1	Sep 2020	Iași, Romania	Challenger	Clay	(Brazil) João Menezes	(Philippines) Treat Huey (United States) Nathaniel Lammons	6–2, 6–2
Win	4–1	Feb 2021	Concepción, Chile	Challenger	Clay	(Brazil) Orlando Luz	(Peru) Sergio Galdós (Ecuador) Diego Hidalgo	7–5, 6–4
Loss	4–2	Mar 2021	Santiago, Chile	Challenger	Clay	(Brazil) Felipe Meligeni Alves	(Venezuela) Luis David Martínez (Portugal) Gonçalo Oliveira	5–7, 1–6
Win	5–2	Apr 2021	Tallahassee, US	Challenger	Clay (green)	(Brazil) Orlando Luz	(United States) Sekou Bangoura (United States) Donald Young	7–6^{(7–2)}, 6–2
Loss	5–3	May 2021	Biella V, Italy	Challenger	Clay	(Brazil) Felipe Meligeni Alves	(Sweden) Andre Goransson (United States) Nathaniel Lammons	6–7^{(3–7)}, 3–6
Win	6–3	Aug 2021	Cordenons, Italy	Challenger	Clay	(Brazil) Orlando Luz	(Peru) Sergio Galdós (Argentina) Renzo Olivo	6–4, 7–6^{(7–5)}
Loss	6–4	Aug 2021	City of San Marino, San Marino	Challenger	Clay	(Brazil) João Menezes	(Venezuela) Luis David Martínez (Czech Republic) Zdeněk Kolář	6–1, 3–6, [3–10]
Win	7–4	Aug 2021	Como, Italy	Challenger	Clay	(Brazil) Felipe Meligeni Alves	(Venezuela) Luis David Martínez (Italy) Andrea Vavassori	6–7^{(2–7)}, 6–4, [10–6]
Loss	7–5	Sep 2021	Tulln an der Donau, Austria	Challenger	Clay	(Brazil) Felipe Meligeni Alves	(Germany) Dustin Brown (Italy) Andrea Vavassori	6–7^{(5–7)}, 1–6
Win	8–5	Nov 2021	Montevideo, Uruguay	Challenger	Clay	(Brazil) Felipe Meligeni Alves	(Uruguay) Ignacio Carou (Italy) Luciano Darderi	6–4, 6–4
Win	9–5	Nov 2021	Campinas, Brazil (2)	Challenger	Clay	(Brazil) Felipe Meligeni Alves	(Brazil) Gilbert Klier Jr. (Brazil) Matheus Pucinelli de Almeida	6–3, 6–1
Loss	9–6	Nov 2021	São Paulo, Brazil	Challenger	Clay	(Brazil) Felipe Meligeni Alves	(Colombia) Nicolás Barrientos (Colombia) Alejandro Gómez	walkover
Loss	9–7	Dec 2021	Florianópolis, Brazil	Challenger	Clay	(Uruguay) Martín Cuevas	(Colombia) Nicolás Barrientos (Colombia) Alejandro Gómez	3–6, 3–6
Win	10–7	Dec 2021	Rio de Janeiro, Brazil	Challenger	Hard	(Brazil) Orlando Luz	(United States) James Cerretani (Brazil) Fernando Romboli	6–3, 7–6^{(7–2)}
Loss	10–8	Apr 2022	Madrid, Spain	Challenger	Clay	(Spain) David Vega Hernández	(Czech Republic) Adam Pavlásek (Slovakia) Igor Zelenay	3–6, 6–3, [6–10]
Win	11–8	May 2022	Bordeaux, France	Challenger	Clay	(Spain) David Vega Hernández	(Monaco) Hugo Nys (Poland) Jan Zieliński	6–4, 6–0
Loss	11–9	Nov 2023	Brasília, Brazil	Challenger	Hard	(Brazil) Marcelo Demoliner	(Colombia) Nicolás Barrientos (Sweden) Andre Goransson	6–7^{(3–7)}, 6–4, [9–11]
Loss	11–10	Aug 2025	Cancún, Mexico	Challenger	Hard	(France) Manuel Guinard	(Mexico) Santiago González (Netherlands) Jean-Julien Rojer	6–7^{(2–7)}, 5–7
Win	12–10	Jul 2026	Braunschweig, Germany	Challenger	Clay	(Brazil) Orlando Luz	(France) Arthur Reymond (France) Luca Sanchez	7–5, 6–2

== National and international representation ==
=== Davis Cup ===
Matos was first nominated to play for Brazil in Davis Cup in September 2021 against Lebanon in doubles. Matos alongside Marcelo Demoliner made his debut in Davis Cup against Benjamin Hassan and Habib Hady and won in three sets at the third rubber of that tie. Later, the Brazilian team confirmed the 4–0 tie and advanced into the 2022 Davis Cup qualifying round. Currently, Matos sports a 3–0 record in Davis Cup matches. He has played only doubles matches thus far.

All Davis Cup Matches: 3–0 (Doubles: 3–0)
2020 Davis Cup World Group I
Round	Date	Opponent	Final match score	Location	Surface	Match	Partner	Opponents	Rubber Score
WGI	September 18–19, 2021	Lebanon	4–0	Jounieh	Clay	III	Marcelo Demoliner	Benjamin Hassan / Habib Hady	6–2, 3–6, 7–6^{(7–5)}
2022 Davis Cup World Group I
WGI	September 16–17, 2022	Portugal	1–3	Viana do Castelo	Hard(i)	III	Felipe Meligeni Alves	Nuno Borges / Francisco Cabral	6–3, 0–6, 6–3
2023 Davis Cup World Group I
Play-offs	February 3–4, 2023	China	4–0	Florianópolis	Clay	III	Felipe Meligeni Alves	Cui Jie / Zhang Ze	6–2, 6–3

== Junior Grand Slam finals ==
=== Doubles: 1 (runner-up) ===
Result	Year	Tournament	Surface	Partner	Opponents	Score
Loss	2014	US Open	Hard	(Brazil) João Menezes	(Australia) Omar Jasika (Japan) Naoki Nakagawa	3–6, 6–7^{(6–8)}
