= Cancún Country Open =

- 2026 Cancún Country Open

ATP Challenger Tour
- Event name: Europcar Cancún Country Open presentado por Telcel OPPO
- Location: Cancún, Mexico
- Venue: Cancún Country Club; Residencial & Golf
- Category: ATP Challenger Tour 125
- Surface: Hard
- Prize money: $225,000 (2026)
- Website: website

The Europcar Cancún Country Open is a professional tennis tournament played on hardcourts. It is currently part of the ATP Challenger Tour. It was first held in Cancún, Mexico in 2025.

== Past finals ==
=== Singles ===
| Year | Champion | Runner-up | Score |
|---|---|---|---|
| 2026 | (Poland) Hubert Hurkacz | (Argentina) Sebastián Báez | 4–6, 6–0, 6–3 |
| 2025 | (Czech Republic) Dalibor Svrčina | (Argentina) Thiago Agustín Tirante | 6–4, 5–7, 6–4 |

=== Doubles ===
| Year | Champions | Runners-up | Score |
|---|---|---|---|
| 2026 | (India) Sriram Balaji (India) Anirudh Chandrasekar | Ivan Liutarevich (Mexico) Miguel Ángel Reyes-Varela | 6–3, 7–6^{(7–4)} |
| 2025 | (Mexico) Santiago González (Netherlands) Jean-Julien Rojer | (France) Manuel Guinard (Brazil) Rafael Matos | 7–6^{(7–2)}, 7–5 |
