= 2025 Santos Brasil Tennis Cup – Doubles =

Doubles
- 2025 Santos Brasil Tennis Cup

Final
- Champions: (Brazil) Pedro Boscardin Dias (Argentina) Gonzalo Villanueva
- Runners-up: (Bolivia) Boris Arias (Bolivia) Federico Zeballos
- Score: 6–2, 6–7^{(3–7)}, [10–7]

Events
Singles	Doubles
← 2024 ·	Santos Brasil Tennis Cup	· 2026 →

Roy Stepanov and Andrés Urrea were the defending champions but chose not to defend their title.

Pedro Boscardin Dias and Gonzalo Villanueva won the title after defeating Boris Arias and Federico Zeballos 6–2, 6–7^{(3–7)}, [10–7] in the final.

== Seeds ==
1. (Bolivia) Boris Arias / (Bolivia) Federico Zeballos (final)
2. (Brazil) Mateus Alves / (Brazil) Luís Britto (first round)
3. (Czech Republic) Zdeněk Kolář / (Zimbabwe) Courtney John Lock (first round)
4. (Peru) Arklon Huertas del Pino / (Peru) Conner Huertas del Pino (quarterfinals, retired)

== Draw ==
=== Key ===
- Q = Qualifier
- WC = Wild card
- LL = Lucky loser
- Alt = Alternate
- ITF = ITF entry
- PR = Protected ranking
- SR = Special ranking
- SE = Special exempt
- JE = Junior exempt
- JR = Junior Accelerator Programme entrant
- CO = College Accelerator Programme entrant
- NG = Next Gen Accelerator Program entrant
- w/o = Walkover
- r = Retired
- d = Defaulted

=== Draw ===
First round
1	(Bolivia) B Arias (Bolivia) F Zeballos	6	7^{8}
(Argentina) Leonardo Aboian (Argentina) Ignacio Monzón	3	6^{6}
WC	(Brazil) Breno Braga (Brazil) Victor Braga	5	2
WC	(Brazil) Victor Hugo Remondy Pagotto (Brazil) João Vítor Scramin do Lago	7	6
4	(Peru) A Huertas del Pino (Peru) C Huertas del Pino	6	6
(Spain) N Álvarez Varona (Spain) N Sánchez Izquierdo	3	4
(Argentina) R Olivo (Brazil) PA Saraiva dos Santos	0	4
(Argentina) H Casanova (Argentina) S Rodríguez Taverna	6	6
(Brazil) E Ribeiro (Brazil) Gabriel Roveri Sidney	7	7
(Peru) G Bueno (Ecuador) Á Guillén Meza	5	5
(Brazil) P Boscardin Dias (Argentina) G Villanueva	6	7^{7}
3	(Czech Republic) Z Kolář (Zimbabwe) CJ Lock	0	6^{2}
(Brazil) M Pucinelli de Almeida (Brazil) P Sakamoto	5	4
(Uruguay) I Carou (Bolivia) JC Prado Ángelo	7	6
(Argentina) Lorenzo Joaquín Rodríguez (Uruguay) F Roncadelli	1	6	[10]
2	(Brazil) M Alves (Brazil) L Britto	6	1	[5]

Quarterfinals
1	(Bolivia) B Arias (Bolivia) F Zeballos	3	6	[10]
WC	(Brazil) VH Remondy Pagotto (Brazil) JV Scramin do Lago	6	0	[5]
4	(Peru) A Huertas del Pino (Peru) C Huertas del Pino	3	0^{r}
(Argentina) H Casanova (Argentina) S Rodríguez Taverna	6	0
(Brazil) E Ribeiro (Brazil) G Roveri Sidney	1	4
(Brazil) P Boscardin Dias (Argentina) G Villanueva	6	6
(Uruguay) I Carou (Bolivia) JC Prado Ángelo	4	6^{5}
(Argentina) LJ Rodríguez (Uruguay) F Roncadelli	6	7^{7}

Semifinals
1	(Bolivia) B Arias (Bolivia) F Zeballos	4	6	[10]
(Argentina) H Casanova (Argentina) S Rodríguez Taverna	6	4	[6]
(Brazil) P Boscardin Dias (Argentina) G Villanueva	4	6	[10]
(Argentina) LJ Rodríguez (Uruguay) F Roncadelli	6	1	[2]

Final
1	(Bolivia) B Arias (Bolivia) F Zeballos	2	7^{7}	[7]
(Brazil) P Boscardin Dias (Argentina) G Villanueva	6	6^{3}	[10]
