= 2025 Santos Brasil Tennis Cup – Singles =

Singles
- 2025 Santos Brasil Tennis Cup

Final
- Champion: (Ecuador) Álvaro Guillén Meza
- Runner-up: (Brazil) Matheus Pucinelli de Almeida
- Score: 6–3, 7–6^{(14–12)}

Events
Singles	Doubles
← 2024 ·	Santos Brasil Tennis Cup	· 2026 →

Alejo Lorenzo Lingua Lavallén was the defending champion but chose not to defend his title.

Álvaro Guillén Meza won the title after defeating Matheus Pucinelli de Almeida 6–3, 7–6^{(14–12)} in the final.

== Seeds ==
1. (Ecuador) Álvaro Guillén Meza (champion)
2. (Peru) Juan Pablo Varillas (first round)
3. (Chile) Matías Soto (second round)
4. (Peru) Gonzalo Bueno (first round)
5. (Argentina) Santiago Rodríguez Taverna (first round, retired)
6. (Argentina) Juan Bautista Torres (second round)
7. (Bolivia) Juan Carlos Prado Ángelo (second round)
8. (Argentina) Genaro Alberto Olivieri (second round)

== Draw ==
=== Key ===
- Q = Qualifier
- WC = Wild card
- LL = Lucky loser
- Alt = Alternate
- ITF = ITF entry
- PR = Protected ranking
- SR = Special ranking
- SE = Special exempt
- JE = Junior exempt
- JR = Junior Accelerator Programme entrant
- CO = College Accelerator Programme entrant
- NG = Next Gen Accelerator Program entrant
- w/o = Walkover
- r = Retired
- d = Defaulted

=== Finals ===
Semifinals
1	(Ecuador) Álvaro Guillén Meza	6	7^{7}
(Uruguay) Franco Roncadelli	2	6^{4}
(Brazil) Matheus Pucinelli de Almeida	7	7
Q	(Argentina) Nicolás Kicker	5	5

Final
1	(Ecuador) Álvaro Guillén Meza	6	7^{14}
(Brazil) Matheus Pucinelli de Almeida	3	6^{12}

=== Top half ===
First round
1	(Ecuador) Á Guillén Meza	6	6
(Czech Republic) Z Kolář	4	4
Q	(United States) B Kuzuhara	6	3	6
Q	(Peru) C Huertas del Pino	4	6	1
PR	(Jamaica) B Bicknell	6	3	3
(Argentina) R Olivo	3	6	6
Q	(Peru) A Huertas del Pino	3	3
7	(Bolivia) JC Prado Ángelo	6	6
3	(Chile) M Soto	6^{8}	6	6
(Brazil) P Sakamoto	7^{10}	2	0
WC	(Brazil) Enzo Kohlmann de Freitas	6	1	0^{r}
(Uruguay) F Roncadelli	4	6	5
(Argentina) G Villanueva	3	7	7^{7}
(Brazil) M Alves	6	5	6^{2}
WC	(Brazil) Bruno Malacarne	4	6^{4}
6	(Argentina) JB Torres	6	7^{7}

Second round
1	(Ecuador) Á Guillén Meza	1	6	6
Q	(United States) B Kuzuhara	6	4	4
(Argentina) R Olivo	5	7	6
7	(Bolivia) JC Prado Ángelo	7	5	1
3	(Chile) M Soto	6^{2}	4
(Uruguay) F Roncadelli	7^{7}	6
(Argentina) G Villanueva	6	1	7
6	(Argentina) JB Torres	1	6	5

Quarterfinals
1	(Ecuador) Á Guillén Meza	6	6
(Argentina) R Olivo	3	3
(Uruguay) F Roncadelli	6	6
(Argentina) G Villanueva	4	2

Semifinals
1	(Ecuador) Á Guillén Meza	6	7^{7}
(Uruguay) F Roncadelli	2	6^{4}

=== Bottom half ===
First round
8	(Argentina) GA Olivieri	2	6	6
(Brazil) JL Reis da Silva	6	4	2
(Argentina) L Midón	6	6
(Spain) N Sánchez Izquierdo	4	2
WC	(Brazil) E Ribeiro	7^{7}	2	0
(Brazil) M Pucinelli de Almeida	6^{4}	6	6
(Spain) N Álvarez Varona	6	6
4	(Peru) G Bueno	4	2
5	(Argentina) S Rodríguez Taverna	7^{7}	3	1^{r}
Alt	(Argentina) H Casanova	6^{3}	6	5
Q	(Brazil) Wilson Leite	3	4
Q	(Argentina) N Kicker	6	6
Q	(Brazil) J Pereira	4	3
(Brazil) P Boscardin Dias	6	6
Alt	(Italy) G Mager	6	6
2	(Peru) JP Varillas	3	2

Second round
8	(Argentina) GA Olivieri	4	5
(Argentina) L Midón	6	7
(Brazil) M Pucinelli de Almeida	6	4	6
(Spain) N Álvarez Varona	1	6	1
Alt	(Argentina) H Casanova	6	3	5
Q	(Argentina) N Kicker	1	6	7
(Brazil) P Boscardin Dias	6^{4}	6^{4}
Alt	(Italy) G Mager	7^{7}	7^{7}

Quarterfinals
(Argentina) L Midón	2	3
(Brazil) M Pucinelli de Almeida	6	6
Q	(Argentina) N Kicker	6	7^{7}
Alt	(Italy) G Mager	4	6^{0}

Semifinals
(Brazil) M Pucinelli de Almeida	7	7
Q	(Argentina) N Kicker	5	5
