= 2026 Santos Brasil Tennis Cup – Singles =

Singles
- 2026 Santos Brasil Tennis Cup

Final
- Champion: (Uruguay) Franco Roncadelli
- Runner-up: (Argentina) Hernán Casanova
- Score: 6–3, 6–2

Events
Singles	Doubles
- Santos Brasil Tennis Cup

Álvaro Guillén Meza was the defending champion but chose not to defend his title.

Franco Roncadelli won the title after defeating Hernán Casanova 6–3, 6–2 in the final.

== Seeds ==
1. (Argentina) Guido Iván Justo (second round)
2. (Uruguay) Franco Roncadelli (champion)
3. (Bolivia) Murkel Dellien (quarterfinals)
4. (Argentina) Facundo Mena (second round)
5. (Peru) Juan Pablo Varillas (first round)
6. (Argentina) Nicolás Kicker (second round)
7. (Argentina) Juan Manuel La Serna (second round)
8. (Brazil) Matheus Pucinelli de Almeida (semifinals)

== Draw ==
Key

- Q = Qualifier
- WC = Wild card
- LL = Lucky loser
- Alt = Alternate
- ITF = ITF entry
- PR = Protected ranking
- SR = Special ranking
- SE = Special exempt
- JE = Junior exempt
- JR = Junior Accelerator Programme entrant
- CO = College Accelerator Programme entrant
- NG = Next Gen Accelerator Program entrant
- w/o = Walkover
- r = Retired
- d = Defaulted

=== Finals ===
Semifinals
WC	(Brazil) Guto Miguel	3	4
(Argentina) Hernán Casanova	6	6
8	(Brazil) Matheus Pucinelli de Almeida	6	3	4
2	(Uruguay) Franco Roncadelli	1	6	6

Final
(Argentina) Hernán Casanova	3	2
2	(Uruguay) Franco Roncadelli	6	6

=== Top half ===
First round
1	(Argentina) GI Justo	6	6
Q	(Brazil) LF Miguel	4	0
(Argentina) Lorenzo Joaquín Rodríguez	7^{7}	6
Alt	(Brazil) J Pereira	6^{3}	2
WC	(Brazil) G Miguel	6	6
Q	(Brazil) Wilson Leite	3	1
WC	(Brazil) Pedro Rodrigues Longobardi	1	3
7	(Argentina) JM La Serna	6	6
3	(Bolivia) M Dellien	7^{7}	6
Q	(Brazil) Bruno Fernandez	6^{3}	3
(Dominican Republic) N Hardt	6	6
Q	(Argentina) Fermín Tenti	1	2
(Brazil) M Alves	7^{7}	1	2
(Argentina) H Casanova	6^{5}	6	6
Q	(Brazil) Nicolas Zanellato	0	1
6	(Argentina) N Kicker	6	6

Second round
1	(Argentina) GI Justo	2	1
(Argentina) LJ Rodríguez	6	6
WC	(Brazil) G Miguel	6	6
7	(Argentina) JM La Serna	4	2
3	(Bolivia) M Dellien	4	6	3
(Dominican Republic) N Hardt	6	3	0^{r}
(Argentina) H Casanova	6	7
6	(Argentina) N Kicker	3	5

Quarterfinals
(Argentina) LJ Rodríguez	4	4
WC	(Brazil) G Miguel	6	6
3	(Bolivia) M Dellien	2	0
(Argentina) H Casanova	6	6

Semifinals
WC	(Brazil) G Miguel	3	4
(Argentina) H Casanova	6	6

=== Bottom half ===
First round
8	(Brazil) M Pucinelli de Almeida	6	6
Q	(Brazil) Rafael Tosetto	0	1
(Argentina) V Aboian	7^{7}	7^{9}
(Brazil) P Sakamoto	6^{2}	6^{7}
(Colombia) Miguel Tobón	7^{7}	7^{8}
(Brazil) E Ribeiro	6^{2}	6^{6}
(Brazil) D Dutra da Silva	5	2
4	(Argentina) F Mena	7	6
5	(Peru) JP Varillas	5	3
(United States) Ryan Dickerson	7	6
(Brazil) João Eduardo Schiessl	6	6
WC	(Brazil) Gustavo Albieri	1	1
(Argentina) Ignacio Monzón	4	5
(Peru) C Huertas del Pino	6	7
(Argentina) S de la Fuente	5	5
2	(Uruguay) F Roncadelli	7	7

Second round
8	(Brazil) M Pucinelli de Almeida	6	6
(Argentina) V Aboian	3	2
(Colombia) M Tobón	6	2	6
4	(Argentina) F Mena	2	6	1
(United States) R Dickerson	3	2
(Brazil) JE Schiessl	6	6
(Peru) C Huertas del Pino	6^{5}	2
2	(Uruguay) F Roncadelli	7^{7}	6

Quarterfinals
8	(Brazil) M Pucinelli de Almeida	6	6
(Colombia) M Tobón	1	3
(Brazil) JE Schiessl	3	1
2	(Uruguay) F Roncadelli	6	6

Semifinals
8	(Brazil) M Pucinelli de Almeida	6	3	4
2	(Uruguay) F Roncadelli	1	6	6
