= 2024 Santos Brasil Tennis Cup – Doubles =

Doubles
- 2024 Santos Brasil Tennis Cup

Final
- Champions: (Israel) Roy Stepanov (Colombia) Andrés Urrea
- Runners-up: (Lebanon) Hady Habib (United States) Trey Hilderbrand
- Score: Walkover

Events
Singles	Doubles
- Santos Brasil Tennis Cup

This was the first edition of the tournament.

Roy Stepanov and Andrés Urrea won the title via walkover after Hady Habib and Trey Hilderbrand withdrew before the final.

== Seeds ==
1. (Brazil) Luís Britto / (Argentina) Gonzalo Villanueva (first round, withdrew)
2. (Argentina) Hernán Casanova / (Argentina) Santiago Rodríguez Taverna (first round)
3. (Israel) Roy Stepanov / (Colombia) Andrés Urrea (champions)
4. (Japan) Seita Watanabe / (Japan) Takeru Yuzuki (withdrew)
5. (Argentina) Leonardo Aboian / (Argentina) Valerio Aboian (semifinals)

== Draw ==
Key

- Q = Qualifier
- WC = Wild card
- LL = Lucky loser
- Alt = Alternate
- ITF = ITF entry
- PR = Protected ranking
- SR = Special ranking
- SE = Special exempt
- JE = Junior exempt
- JR = Junior Accelerator Programme entrant
- CO = College Accelerator Programme entrant
- NG = Next Gen Accelerator Program entrant
- w/o = Walkover
- r = Retired
- d = Defaulted

=== Draw ===
First round
1	(Brazil) L Britto (Argentina) G Villanueva
Alt	(Tunisia) A Ouakaa (Bulgaria) Leonid Sheyngezikht	w/o
(Uruguay) I Carou (Argentina) AL Lingua Lavallén	6^{5}	3
(Argentina) LE Ambrogi (Uruguay) F Roncadelli	7^{7}	6
3	(Israel) R Stepanov (Colombia) A Urrea	6	6
WC	(Brazil) L Miguel (Brazil) João Pedro Prudencio	2	2
(Brazil) P Boscardin Dias (Kazakhstan) D Popko	6	6
WC	(Brazil) Rai Vicente de Araujo (Brazil) Lucas Vidaller Ranciaro	3	0
(Brazil) Enrique Bogo (Brazil) Rafael Tosetto	2	5
(United States) B Kuzuhara (Brazil) Nicolas Zanellato	6	7
(Brazil) Wilson Leite (Brazil) J Pereira
(Argentina) F Ribero (Argentina) JB Torres	w/o
(Lebanon) H Habib (United States) T Hilderbrand	7^{7}	6
2	(Argentina) H Casanova (Argentina) S Rodríguez Taverna	6^{4}	4

Quarterfinals
Alt	(Tunisia) A Ouakaa (Bulgaria) L Sheyngezikht
(Argentina) LE Ambrogi (Uruguay) F Roncadelli	w/o
3	(Israel) R Stepanov (Colombia) A Urrea	6	6
(Brazil) P Boscardin Dias (Kazakhstan) D Popko	4	4
(United States) B Kuzuhara (Brazil) N Zanellato
5	(Argentina) Leonardo Aboian (Argentina) V Aboian	w/o
(Argentina) F Ribero (Argentina) JB Torres	6	3	[7]
(Lebanon) H Habib (United States) T Hilderbrand	3	6	[10]

Semifinals
(Argentina) LE Ambrogi (Uruguay) F Roncadelli
3	(Israel) R Stepanov (Colombia) A Urrea	w/o
5	(Argentina) L Aboian (Argentina) V Aboian	6	6^{2}	[7]
(Lebanon) H Habib (United States) T Hilderbrand	3	7^{7}	[10]

Final
3	(Israel) R Stepanov (Colombia) A Urrea	w/o
(Lebanon) H Habib (United States) T Hilderbrand
