= 2024 Santos Brasil Tennis Cup – Singles =

Singles
- 2024 Santos Brasil Tennis Cup

Final
- Champion: (Argentina) Alejo Lorenzo Lingua Lavallén
- Runner-up: (Lebanon) Hady Habib
- Score: 4–6, 6–4, 6–3

Events
| Singles | Doubles |
- Santos Brasil Tennis Cup

This was the first edition of the tournament.

Alejo Lorenzo Lingua Lavallén won the title after defeating Hady Habib 4–6, 6–4, 6–3 in the final.

== Seeds ==
1. (Kazakhstan) Dmitry Popko (second round)
2. (Argentina) Santiago Rodríguez Taverna (semifinals)
3. (Argentina) Renzo Olivo (second round)
4. (Lebanon) Hady Habib (final)
5. (Ecuador) Álvaro Guillén Meza (second round)
6. (Turkey) Ergi Kırkın (second round)
7. (Paraguay) Daniel Vallejo (quarterfinals)
8. (Brazil) Pedro Sakamoto (second round)

== Draw ==
Key

- Q = Qualifier
- WC = Wild card
- LL = Lucky loser
- Alt = Alternate
- ITF = ITF entry
- PR = Protected ranking
- SR = Special ranking
- SE = Special exempt
- JE = Junior exempt
- JR = Junior Accelerator Programme entrant
- CO = College Accelerator Programme entrant
- NG = Next Gen Accelerator Program entrant
- w/o = Walkover
- r = Retired
- d = Defaulted

=== Finals ===
Semifinals
Alt | (Argentina) Juan Bautista Torres | 5 | 4
4 | (Lebanon) Hady Habib | 7 | 6
Q | (Argentina) Alejo Lorenzo Lingua Lavallén | 6 | 6
2 | (Argentina) Santiago Rodríguez Taverna | 3 | 2

Final
4 | (Lebanon) Hady Habib | 6 | 4 | 3
Q | (Argentina) Alejo Lorenzo Lingua Lavallén | 4 | 6 | 6

=== Top half ===
First round
1 | (Kazakhstan) D Popko | 6 | 7
Alt | (Argentina) GI Justo | 0 | 5
Q | (Tunisia) A Ouakaa | 2 | 5
(Argentina) H Casanova | 6 | 7
(Brazil) P Boscardin Dias | 5 | 1
Alt | (Argentina) JB Torres | 7 | 6
(Argentina) V Aboian | 5 | 4
5 | (Ecuador) Á Guillén Meza | 7 | 6
4 | (Lebanon) H Habib | 6 | 6
Q | (Brazil) Igor Gimenez | 4 | 0
(Argentina) LE Ambrogi | 6 | 5 | 2
Q | (Uruguay) F Roncadelli | 2 | 7 | 6
(Argentina) F Mena | 3 | 6^{5}
(United States) B Kuzuhara | 6 | 7^{7}
WC | (Brazil) J Pereira | 7 | 3 | 1
6 | (Turkey) E Kırkın | 5 | 6 | 6

Second round
1 | (Kazakhstan) D Popko | 4 | 6^{5}
(Argentina) H Casanova | 6 | 7^{7}
Alt | (Argentina) JB Torres | 7^{7} | 5 | 6
5 | (Ecuador) Á Guillén Meza | 6^{2} | 7 | 0
4 | (Lebanon) H Habib | 6 | 6
Q | (Uruguay) F Roncadelli | 4 | 2
(United States) B Kuzuhara | 6 | 4 | 7
6 | (Turkey) E Kırkın | 3 | 6 | 5

Quarterfinals
(Argentina) H Casanova | 4 | 0
Alt | (Argentina) JB Torres | 6 | 6
4 | (Lebanon) H Habib | 7^{7} | 1 | 6
(United States) B Kuzuhara | 6^{5} | 6 | 4

Semifinals
Alt | (Argentina) JB Torres | 5 | 4
4 | (Lebanon) H Habib | 7 | 6

=== Bottom half ===
First round
7 | (Paraguay) AD Vallejo | 6 | 6
WC | (Brazil) K Sell | 2 | 2
PR | (Peru) N Álvarez | 5 | 2
(Peru) G Bueno | 7 | 6
Q | (Argentina) AL Lingua Lavallén | 6 | 4 | 6
SE | (Brazil) D Dutra da Silva | 3 | 6 | 3
Q | (Uruguay) I Carou | 2 | 2
3 | (Argentina) R Olivo | 6 | 6
8 | (Brazil) P Sakamoto | 6 | 6
WC | (Brazil) L Miguel | 4 | 1
Alt | (Brazil) Wilson Leite | 4 | 2
(Argentina) G Villanueva | 6 | 6
(Greece) S Sakellaridis | 3 | 1^{r}
Q | (Argentina) Leonardo Aboian | 6 | 2
(Brazil) Nicolas Zanellato | 2 | 4
2 | (Argentina) S Rodríguez Taverna | 6 | 6

Second round
7 | (Paraguay) AD Vallejo | w/o
(Peru) G Bueno
Q | (Argentina) AL Lingua Lavallén | 7^{7} | 6
3 | (Argentina) R Olivo | 6^{2} | 1
8 | (Brazil) P Sakamoto | 6 | 2 | 3
(Argentina) G Villanueva | 3 | 6 | 6
Q | (Argentina) L Aboian | 7 | 3 | 4
2 | (Argentina) S Rodríguez Taverna | 5 | 6 | 6

Quarterfinals
7 | (Paraguay) AD Vallejo | 5 | 6^{1}
Q | (Argentina) AL Lingua Lavallén | 7 | 7^{7}
(Argentina) G Villanueva | 3 | 6^{10}
2 | (Argentina) S Rodríguez Taverna | 6 | 7^{12}

Semifinals
Q | (Argentina) AL Lingua Lavallén | 6 | 6
2 | (Argentina) S Rodríguez Taverna | 3 | 2
