= 2024 Lima Challenger – Singles =

Singles
- 2024 Lima Challenger

Final
- Champion: (Argentina) Juan Manuel Cerúndolo
- Runner-up: (Brazil) Pedro Boscardin Dias
- Score: 6–4, 6–3

Events
| Singles | Doubles |
| ← 2023 · | Lima Challenger | · 2024 → |

Luciano Darderi was the defending champion but chose not to defend his title.

Juan Manuel Cerúndolo won the title after defeating Pedro Boscardin Dias 6–4, 6–3 in the final.

== Seeds ==
1. (Argentina) Juan Manuel Cerúndolo (champion)
2. (Argentina) Santiago Rodríguez Taverna (second round)
3. (Lebanon) Hady Habib (first round)
4. (Argentina) Renzo Olivo (first round)
5. (Peru) Gonzalo Bueno (first round)
6. (Ecuador) Álvaro Guillén Meza (first round)
7. (Argentina) Andrea Collarini (withdrew)
8. (Brazil) Pedro Sakamoto (second round)
9. (Jamaica) Blaise Bicknell (first round)

== Draw ==
Key

- Q = Qualifier
- WC = Wild card
- LL = Lucky loser
- Alt = Alternate
- ITF = ITF entry
- PR = Protected ranking
- SR = Special ranking
- SE = Special exempt
- JE = Junior exempt
- JR = Junior Accelerator Programme entrant
- CO = College Accelerator Programme entrant
- NG = Next Gen Accelerator Program entrant
- w/o = Walkover
- r = Retired
- d = Defaulted

=== Finals ===
Semifinals
1 | (Argentina) Juan Manuel Cerúndolo | 7^{7} | 5 | 6
(Argentina) Juan Bautista Torres | 6^{5} | 7 | 4
Alt | (Brazil) Pedro Boscardin Dias | 6 | 6
(Argentina) Hernán Casanova | 3 | 4

Final
1 | (Argentina) Juan Manuel Cerúndolo | 6 | 6
Alt | (Brazil) Pedro Boscardin Dias | 4 | 3

=== Top half ===
First round
1 | (Argentina) JM Cerúndolo | 6 | 5 | 7^{7}
(Argentina) L Midón | 3 | 7 | 6^{3}
Q | (United States) Harrison Adams | 4 | 2
(Argentina) G Villanueva | 6 | 6
(United States) G Johns | 6 | 6
WC | (Peru) Luis José Nakamine | 2 | 2
(Brazil) M Pucinelli de Almeida | 6 | 6
6 | (Ecuador) Á Guillén Meza | 3 | 4
4 | (Argentina) R Olivo | 2 | 1
(Argentina) JB Torres | 6 | 6
Q | (United Kingdom) Emile Hudd | 4 | 7^{7} | 2
(Bolivia) JC Prado Ángelo | 6 | 6^{4} | 6
(Dominican Republic) R Cid Subervi | 6 | 6^{2} | 5
(Argentina) F Mena | 3 | 7^{7} | 7
WC | (United States) Milledge Cossu | 1 | 0
8 | (Brazil) P Sakamoto | 6 | 6

Second round
1 | (Argentina) JM Cerúndolo | 6 | 6
(Argentina) G Villanueva | 4 | 1
(United States) G Johns | 0 | 3
(Brazil) M Pucinelli de Almeida | 6 | 6
(Argentina) JB Torres | 6 | 6
(Bolivia) JC Prado Ángelo | 0 | 2
(Argentina) F Mena | 6 | 6
8 | (Brazil) P Sakamoto | 4 | 4

Quarterfinals
1 | (Argentina) JM Cerúndolo | 7^{7} | 4 | 6
(Brazil) M Pucinelli de Almeida | 6^{3} | 6 | 3
(Argentina) JB Torres | 6 | 7^{7}
(Argentina) F Mena | 3 | 6^{4}

Semifinals
1 | (Argentina) JM Cerúndolo | 7^{7} | 5 | 6
(Argentina) JB Torres | 6^{5} | 7 | 4

=== Bottom half ===
First round
5 | (Peru) G Bueno | 6^{6} | 4
(Brazil) JL Reis da Silva | 7^{8} | 6
Alt | (Brazil) P Boscardin Dias | 6 | 6
(Argentina) V Aboian | 3 | 3
Alt | (Brazil) Nicolas Zanellato | 6^{3} | 3
(Argentina) AL Lingua Lavallén | 7^{7} | 6
Q | (Brazil) K Sell | 6 | 4 | 6
3 | (Lebanon) H Habib | 3 | 6 | 4
9 | (Jamaica) B Bicknell | 1 | 0
(Argentina) H Casanova | 6 | 6
Q | (Brazil) M Barreiros Reyes | 2 | 7 | 5
Q | (Brazil) Igor Gimenez | 6 | 5 | 7
WC | (Peru) N Álvarez | 3 | 3
Q | (Spain) Diego Augusto Barreto Sánchez | 6 | 6
LL | (Brazil) Wilson Leite | 2 | 6 | 5
2 | (Argentina) S Rodríguez Taverna | 6 | 2 | 7

Second round
(Brazil) JL Reis da Silva | 2 | 6^{3}
Alt | (Brazil) P Boscardin Dias | 6 | 7^{7}
(Argentina) AL Lingua Lavallén | 2 | 4
Q | (Brazil) K Sell | 6 | 6
(Argentina) H Casanova | 6 | 6
Q | (Brazil) I Gimenez | 0 | 3
Q | (Spain) DA Barreto Sánchez | 7^{7} | 7
2 | (Argentina) S Rodríguez Taverna | 6^{5} | 5

Quarterfinals
Alt | (Brazil) P Boscardin Dias | w/o
Q | (Brazil) K Sell
(Argentina) H Casanova | 6 | 6
Q | (Spain) DA Barreto Sánchez | 1 | 2

Semifinals
Alt | (Brazil) P Boscardin Dias | 6 | 6
(Argentina) H Casanova | 3 | 4
