= 2024 Santos Brasil Tennis Cup =

- Date: 6–12 May
- Edition: 1st
- Surface: Clay
- Location: Santos, Brazil

Champions

Singles
- (Argentina) Alejo Lorenzo Lingua Lavallén

Doubles
- (Israel) Roy Stepanov / (Colombia) Andrés Urrea
- Santos Brasil Tennis Cup

The 2024 Santos Brasil Tennis Cup was a professional tennis tournament played on clay courts. It was the first edition of the tournament which was part of the 2024 ATP Challenger Tour. It took place in Santos, Brazil between 6 and 12 May 2024.

== Singles main-draw entrants ==
=== Seeds ===
Country	Player	Rank^{1}	Seed
KAZ	Dmitry Popko	234	1
ARG	Santiago Rodríguez Taverna	237	2
ARG	Renzo Olivo	278	3
LIB	Hady Habib	290	4
ECU	Álvaro Guillén Meza	294	5
TUR	Ergi Kırkın	299	6
PAR	Daniel Vallejo	304	7
BRA	Pedro Sakamoto	305	8

- ^{1} Rankings as of 22 April 2024.

=== Other entrants ===
The following players received wildcards into the singles main draw:

- (Brazil) Luís Miguel
- (Brazil) José Pereira
- (Brazil) Karue Sell

The following player received entry into the singles main draw using a protected ranking:

- (Peru) Nicolás Álvarez

The following player received entry into the singles main draw as a special exempt:

- (Brazil) Daniel Dutra da Silva

The following players received entry into the singles main draw as alternates:

- (Argentina) Guido Iván Justo
- (Brazil) Wilson Leite
- (Argentina) Juan Bautista Torres

The following players received entry from the qualifying draw:

- (Argentina) Leonardo Aboian
- (Uruguay) Ignacio Carou
- (Brazil) Igor Gimenez
- (Argentina) Alejo Lorenzo Lingua Lavallén
- (Tunisia) Aziz Ouakaa
- (Uruguay) Franco Roncadelli

== Champions ==
=== Singles ===
- (Argentina) Alejo Lorenzo Lingua Lavallén def. (Lebanon) Hady Habib 4–6, 6–4, 6–3.

=== Doubles ===
- (Israel) Roy Stepanov / (Colombia) Andrés Urrea def. (Lebanon) Hady Habib / (United States) Trey Hilderbrand via walkover.
