= 2024 Lima Challenger – Doubles =

Doubles
- 2024 Lima Challenger

Final
- Champions: (Lebanon) Hady Habib (United States) Trey Hilderbrand
- Runners-up: (Brazil) Pedro Boscardin Dias (Brazil) Pedro Sakamoto
- Score: 7–5, 6–3

Events
Singles	Doubles
← 2023 ·	Lima Challenger	· 2024 →

Mateus Alves and Eduardo Ribeiro were the defending champions but chose not to defend their title.

Hady Habib and Trey Hilderbrand won the title after defeating Pedro Boscardin Dias and Pedro Sakamoto 7–5, 6–3 in the final.

== Seeds ==
1. (Brazil) Luís Britto / (Argentina) Gonzalo Villanueva (semifinals)
2. (United Kingdom) Emile Hudd / (United Kingdom) David Stevenson (first round)
3. (Japan) Seita Watanabe / (Japan) Takeru Yuzuki (quarterfinals)
4. (Brazil) Pedro Boscardin Dias / (Brazil) Pedro Sakamoto (final)

== Draw ==
Key

- Q = Qualifier
- WC = Wild card
- LL = Lucky loser
- Alt = Alternate
- ITF = ITF entry
- PR = Protected ranking
- SR = Special ranking
- SE = Special exempt
- JE = Junior exempt
- JR = Junior Accelerator Programme entrant
- CO = College Accelerator Programme entrant
- NG = Next Gen Accelerator Program entrant
- w/o = Walkover
- r = Retired
- d = Defaulted

=== Draw ===
First round
1	(Brazil) L Britto (Argentina) G Villanueva	6	5	[10]
(Peru) G Bueno (Bolivia) JC Prado Ángelo	4	7	[7]
Alt	(Brazil) Igor Gimenez (Brazil) JL Reis da Silva	3	2
(Argentina) Leonardo Aboian (Argentina) V Aboian	6	6
4	(Brazil) P Boscardin Dias (Brazil) P Sakamoto	6	6
(Peru) C Huertas del Pino (Argentina) AL Lingua Lavallén	2	3
WC	(Ecuador) E Gómez (Peru) Luis José Nakamine	6	6
WC	(United States) Milledge Cossu (Peru) Sebastián Rodríguez	3	3
(Brazil) M Pucinelli de Almeida (Brazil) Nicolas Zanellato	7^{7}	7
(Dominican Republic) R Cid Subervi (Israel) R Stepanov	6^{5}	5
(Argentina) Tomás Farjat (Ecuador) Á Guillén Meza	5	2
3	(Japan) S Watanabe (Japan) T Yuzuki	7	6
(United States) G Johns (United States) N Schachter	6	6
(Uruguay) I Carou (Argentina) F Mena	2	4
(Lebanon) H Habib (United States) T Hilderbrand	6	6
2	(United Kingdom) Emile Hudd (United Kingdom) D Stevenson	3	3

Quarterfinals
1	(Brazil) L Britto (Argentina) G Villanueva	6	6
(Argentina) L Aboian (Argentina) V Aboian	2	1
4	(Brazil) P Boscardin Dias (Brazil) P Sakamoto	6	6
WC	(Ecuador) E Gómez (Peru) LJ Nakamine	4	4
(Brazil) M Pucinelli de Almeida (Brazil) N Zanellato	7^{9}	6
3	(Japan) S Watanabe (Japan) T Yuzuki	6^{7}	4
(United States) G Johns (United States) N Schachter	4	6	[4]
(Lebanon) H Habib (United States) T Hilderbrand	6	2	[10]

Semifinals
1	(Brazil) L Britto (Argentina) G Villanueva	3	3
4	(Brazil) P Boscardin Dias (Brazil) P Sakamoto	6	6
(Brazil) M Pucinelli de Almeida (Brazil) N Zanellato	4	3
(Lebanon) H Habib (United States) T Hilderbrand	6	6

Final
4	(Brazil) P Boscardin Dias (Brazil) P Sakamoto	5	3
(Lebanon) H Habib (United States) T Hilderbrand	7	6
