= 2026 Santos Brasil Tennis Cup – Doubles =

Doubles
- 2026 Santos Brasil Tennis Cup

Final
- Champions: (Brazil) Guto Miguel (Brazil) Luís Felipe Miguel
- Runners-up: (Brazil) Mateus Alves (Brazil) Pedro Sakamoto
- Score: 6–3, 6–4

Events
Singles	Doubles
- Santos Brasil Tennis Cup

Pedro Boscardin Dias and Gonzalo Villanueva were the defending champions but chose not to defend their title.

Guto and Luís Felipe Miguel won the title after defeating Mateus Alves and Pedro Sakamoto 6–3, 6–4 in the final.

== Seeds ==
1. (Peru) Alexander Merino / (Bolivia) Federico Zeballos (semifinals)
2. (Brazil) Daniel Dutra da Silva / (Argentina) Facundo Mena (semifinals, withdrew)
3. (Brazil) Eduardo Ribeiro / (Brazil) Gabriel Roveri Sidney (first round)
4. (Argentina) Valentín Basel / (Argentina) Santiago de la Fuente (first round)

== Draw ==
Key

- Q = Qualifier
- WC = Wild card
- LL = Lucky loser
- Alt = Alternate
- ITF = ITF entry
- PR = Protected ranking
- SR = Special ranking
- SE = Special exempt
- JE = Junior exempt
- JR = Junior Accelerator Programme entrant
- CO = College Accelerator Programme entrant
- NG = Next Gen Accelerator Program entrant
- w/o = Walkover
- r = Retired
- d = Defaulted

First round
1	(Peru) A Merino (Bolivia) F Zeballos	7	5	[10]
(Brazil) Bruno Oliveira (United States) N Schachter	5	7	[7]
WC	(Brazil) Gustavo Albieri (Brazil) Henrique Ortenblad Nogueira	1	2
(Peru) A Huertas del Pino (Peru) C Huertas del Pino	6	6
3	(Brazil) E Ribeiro (Brazil) Gabriel Roveri Sidney	4	1
(Argentina) V Aboian (Bolivia) M Dellien	6	6
WC	(Brazil) G Miguel (Brazil) LF Miguel	4	3
(Argentina) JM La Serna (Colombia) Miguel Tobón	6	1^{r}
(Brazil) M Alves (Brazil) P Sakamoto	5	6	[13]
(Argentina) H Casanova (Argentina) N Kicker	7	3	[11]
(Brazil) J Pereira (Brazil) João Eduardo Schiessl	6	6
4	(Argentina) Valentín Basel (Argentina) S de la Fuente	3	4
(Argentina) GI Justo (Uruguay) F Roncadelli	3	7^{7}	[10]
(Argentina) Thiago Cigarrán (Argentina) Lautaro Agustín Falabella	6	6^{4}	[5]
(Dominican Republic) N Hardt (Colombia) C Rodríguez	2	6	[8]
2	(Brazil) D Dutra da Silva (Argentina) F Mena	6	3	[10]

Quarterfinals
1	(Peru) A Merino (Bolivia) F Zeballos	5	6	[10]
(Peru) A Huertas del Pino (Peru) C Huertas del Pino	7	3	[7]
(Argentina) V Aboian (Bolivia) M Dellien	1	6	[5]
WC	(Brazil) G Miguel (Brazil) LF Miguel	6	2	[10]
(Brazil) M Alves (Brazil) P Sakamoto	6	6
(Brazil) J Pereira (Brazil) JE Schiessl	2	2
(Argentina) GI Justo (Uruguay) F Roncadelli
2	(Brazil) D Dutra da Silva (Argentina) F Mena	w/o

Semifinals
1	(Peru) A Merino (Bolivia) F Zeballos	5	6	[6]
WC	(Brazil) G Miguel (Brazil) LF Miguel	7	4	[10]
(Brazil) M Alves (Brazil) P Sakamoto	w/o
2	(Brazil) D Dutra da Silva (Argentina) F Mena

Final
WC	(Brazil) G Miguel (Brazil) LF Miguel	6	6
(Brazil) M Alves (Brazil) P Sakamoto	3	4
