= Santos Brasil Tennis Cup =

- 2025 Santos Brasil Tennis Cup

ATP Challenger Tour
- Event name: Santos Brasil Tennis Cup
- Location: Santos, Brazil
- Category: ATP Challenger Tour
- Surface: Clay
- Prize money: $60,000 (2025)
- Website: Website

Current champions (2025)
- Singles: (Ecuador) Álvaro Guillén Meza
- Doubles: (Brazil) Pedro Boscardin Dias (Argentina) Gonzalo Villanueva

The Santos Brasil Tennis Cup is a professional tennis tournament played on clay courts. It is currently part of the ATP Challenger Tour. It was first held in Santos, Brazil in 2024.

== Past finals ==
=== Singles ===
Year	Champion	Runner-up	Score
2026	(Uruguay) Franco Roncadelli	(Argentina) Hernán Casanova	6–3, 6–2
2025	(Ecuador) Álvaro Guillén Meza	(Brazil) Matheus Pucinelli de Almeida	6–3, 7–6^{(14–12)}
2024	(Argentina) Alejo Lorenzo Lingua Lavallén	(Lebanon) Hady Habib	4–6, 6–4, 6–3

=== Doubles ===
Year	Champions	Runners-up	Score
2026	(Brazil) Guto Miguel (Brazil) Luís Felipe Miguel	(Brazil) Mateus Alves (Brazil) Pedro Sakamoto	6–3, 6–4
2025	(Brazil) Pedro Boscardin Dias (Argentina) Gonzalo Villanueva	(Bolivia) Boris Arias (Bolivia) Federico Zeballos	6–2, 6–7^{(3–7)}, [10–7]
2024	(Israel) Roy Stepanov (Colombia) Andrés Urrea	(Lebanon) Hady Habib (United States) Trey Hilderbrand	Walkover
