= 2025 Santos Brasil Tennis Cup =

- Date: 5–11 May
- Edition: 2nd
- Surface: Clay
- Location: Santos, Brazil

Champions

Singles
- (Ecuador) Álvaro Guillén Meza

Doubles
- (Brazil) Pedro Boscardin Dias / (Argentina) Gonzalo Villanueva
← 2024 ·	Santos Brasil Tennis Cup	· 2026 →

The 2025 Santos Brasil Tennis Cup was a professional tennis tournament played on clay courts. It was the second edition of the tournament which was part of the 2025 ATP Challenger Tour. It took place in Santos, Brazil between 5 and 11 May 2025.

== Singles main-draw entrants ==
=== Seeds ===
Country	Player	Rank^{1}	Seed
ECU	Álvaro Guillén Meza	205	1
PER	Juan Pablo Varillas	239	2
CHI	Matías Soto	240	3
PER	Gonzalo Bueno	248	4
ARG	Santiago Rodríguez Taverna	261	5
ARG	Juan Bautista Torres	273	6
BOL	Juan Carlos Prado Ángelo	291	7
ARG	Genaro Alberto Olivieri	302	8

- ^{1} Rankings as of 21 April 2025.

=== Other entrants ===
The following players received wildcards into the singles main draw:

- (Brazil) Enzo Kohlmann de Freitas
- (Brazil) Bruno Malacarne
- (Brazil) Eduardo Ribeiro

The following player received entry into the singles main draw using a protected ranking:

- (Jamaica) Blaise Bicknell

The following players received entry into the singles main draw as alternates:

- (Argentina) Hernán Casanova
- (Italy) Gianluca Mager

The following players received entry from the qualifying draw:

- (Peru) Arklon Huertas del Pino
- (Peru) Conner Huertas del Pino
- (Argentina) Nicolás Kicker
- (United States) Bruno Kuzuhara
- (Brazil) Wilson Leite
- (Brazil) José Pereira

== Champions ==
=== Singles ===
- (Ecuador) Álvaro Guillén Meza def. (Brazil) Matheus Pucinelli de Almeida 6–3, 7–6^{(14–12)}.

=== Doubles ===
- (Brazil) Pedro Boscardin Dias / (Argentina) Gonzalo Villanueva def. (Bolivia) Boris Arias / (Bolivia) Federico Zeballos 6–2, 6–7^{(3–7)}, [10–7].
