= 2024 Lima Challenger =

- Date: 10–16 June
- Edition: 21st
- Surface: Clay
- Location: Lima, Peru

Champions

Singles
- (Argentina) Juan Manuel Cerúndolo

Doubles
- (Lebanon) Hady Habib / (United States) Trey Hilderbrand
← 2023 ·	Lima Challenger	· 2024 →

The 2024 Lima Challenger Copa DirecTV was a professional tennis tournament played on clay courts. It was the 21st edition of the tournament which was part of the 2024 ATP Challenger Tour. It took place in Lima, Peru between 10 and 16 June 2024.

== Singles main-draw entrants ==
=== Seeds ===
Country	Player	Rank^{1}	Seed
ARG	Juan Manuel Cerúndolo	178	1
ARG	Santiago Rodríguez Taverna	245	2
LIB	Hady Habib	259	3
ARG	Renzo Olivo	274	4
PER	Gonzalo Bueno	276	5
ECU	Álvaro Guillén Meza	279	6
~~ARG~~	~~Andrea Collarini~~	~~292~~	~~7~~
BRA	Pedro Sakamoto	302	8
JAM	Blaise Bicknell	306	9

- ^{1} Rankings are as of 27 May 2024.

=== Other entrants ===
The following players received wildcards into the singles main draw:

- (Peru) Nicolás Álvarez
- (United States) Milledge Cossu
- (Peru) Luis José Nakamine

The following players received entry into the singles main draw as alternates:

- (Brazil) Pedro Boscardin Dias
- (Brazil) Nicolas Zanellato

The following players received entry from the qualifying draw:

- (United States) Harrison Adams
- (Brazil) Mateo Barreiros Reyes
- (Spain) Diego Augusto Barreto Sánchez
- (Brazil) Igor Gimenez
- (United Kingdom) Emile Hudd
- (Brazil) Karue Sell

The following player received entry as a lucky loser:

- (Brazil) Wilson Leite

== Champions ==
=== Singles ===
- (Argentina) Juan Manuel Cerúndolo def. (Brazil) Pedro Boscardin Dias 6–4, 6–3.

=== Doubles ===
- (Lebanon) Hady Habib / (United States) Trey Hilderbrand def. (Brazil) Pedro Boscardin Dias / (Brazil) Pedro Sakamoto 7–5, 6–3.
