= Sekou Bangoura (tennis) =

American tennis player

- Full name: Sekou Bangoura Jr.
- Country (sports): United States
- Residence: Bradenton, Florida, United States
- Born: November 18, 1991 (age 34) Bradenton, Florida, United States
- Height: 1.83 m (6 ft 0 in)
- Turned pro: 2011
- Plays: Right-handed (two handed-backhand)
- Prize money: $331,716

Singles
- Career record: 0–1
- Career titles: 0
- Highest ranking: No. 213 (October 31, 2016)
- Current ranking: No. 1,597 (March 2, 2026)

Grand Slam singles results
- Australian Open: Q1 (2017)
- US Open: Q3 (2016)

Doubles
- Career record: 1-3 (at ATP Tour level, Grand Slam level, and in Davis Cup)
- Career titles: 0
- Highest ranking: No. 147 (November 7, 2016)
- Current ranking: No. 341 (March 2, 2026)

Grand Slam doubles results
- US Open: 1R (2010)
- Last updated on: March 6, 2026.

Sekou Bangoura Jr. (born November 18, 1991) is an American professional tennis player. He has a career-high singles ranking is world No. 213 achieved on October 31, 2016 and his career-high doubles ranking is world No. 147 achieved on November 7, 2016.

== Career ==
Bangoura partnered with Nathan Pasha to win the 2010 Kalamazoo Boys' Junior National Tennis Championship, defeating Jack Sock and Matthew Kandath 7–5, 6–3 in the finals. With their victory, Bangoura and Pasha earned a wildcard into the 2010 US Open doubles event, where they lost in the first round to Michael Kohlmann and Jarkko Nieminen 3–6, 1–6.

Bangoura made his ATP main draw debut at the 2014 Delray Beach International Tennis Championships in the doubles event partnering Vahid Mirzadeh. The pair had only made through the doubles draw as an alternate team but in the first round they defeated the 2nd seeds Eric Butorac and Raven Klaasen 7–5, 3–6, [10–5]. Their run came to a stop in the quarterfinals where they lost to Sam Groth and Max Mirnyi 6–7^{(5–7)}, 4–6.

Bangoura has won 10 singles titles and 21 doubles titles all achieved on the ITF Futures Tour with one sole doubles title on the ATP Challenger tour.

== Personal life ==
Born in the United States, Bangoura is of Guinean descent. His father was Guinea's top tennis player in his youth.

== ATP Challenger and ITF Futures/World Tennis Tour finals ==
=== Singles: 20 (10–10) ===
Legend (singles) ATP Challenger Tour (0–0) ITF Futures/World Tennis Tour (10–10)	Finals by surface Hard (3–4) Clay (7–6) Grass (0–0) Carpet (0–0)

Result	W–L	Date	Tournament	Tier	Surface	Opponent	Score
Loss	0–1	Nov 2012	USA F30, Pensacola	Futures	Clay	(France) Florian Reynet	0–6, 0–6
Win	1–1	Nov 2013	USA F30, Niceville	Futures	Clay	(France) Éric Prodon	7–6^{(11–9)} retired
Win	2–1	Jan 2014	USA F1, Plantation	Futures	Clay	(Japan) Yoshihito Nishioka	6–2, 6–4
Loss	2–2	Jun 2015	USA F18, Rochester	Futures	Clay	(Ecuador) Emilio Gómez	6–7^{(3–7)}, 4–6
Loss	2–3	Nov 2015	USA F34, Waco	Futures	Hard	(Switzerland) Henri Laaksonen	3–6, 6–4, 1–6
Win	3–3	Dec 2015	Dominican Republic F3, Santo Domingo	Futures	Hard	(Argentina) Facundo Mena	6–7^{(6–8)}, 6–3, 6–2
Win	4–3	Jun 2016	USA F18, Winston-Salem	Futures	Hard	(Barbados) Darian King	6–3, 6–2
Loss	4–4	Nov 2017	USA F36, Niceville	Futures	Clay	(United States) Patrick Kypson	5–7, 7–5, 1–6
Win	5–4	May 2018	Poland F3, Ustroń	Futures	Clay	(Poland) Pawel Clas	4–6, 7–5, 6–4
Win	6–4	May 2018	Czech Republic F2, Jablonec	Futures	Clay	(Germany) Peter Heller	6–4, 6–3
Loss	6–5	Jul 2018	Germany F5, Kamen	Futures	Clay	(Bulgaria) Diminar Kuzmanov	1–6, 5–7
Win	7–5	Aug 2018	USA F23, Boston	Futures	Hard	(France) Antoine Hoang	7–5, 6–2
Win	8–5	Jan 2019	M15 Naples, United States	World Tennis Tour	Clay	(Brazil) Pedro Sakamoto	7–6^{(8–6)}, 6–0
Loss	8–6	Jan 2019	M25 Palm Coast, United States	World Tennis Tour	Clay	(Peru) Nicolás Álvarez	6–7^{(5–7)}, 6–1, 4−6
Loss	8–7	May 2019	M25 Vero Beach, United States	World Tennis Tour	Clay	(Kazakhstan) Dmitry Popko	1–6, 6–7^{(1–7)}
Win	9–7	Apr 2022	M15 Sunrise, United States	World Tennis Tour	Clay	(United States) Evan Zhu	6–4, 6–2
Win	10–7	May 2022	M15 Vero Beach, United States	World Tennis Tour	Clay	(United States) Ethan Quinn	6–4, 6–3
Loss	10–8	Jun 2022	M15 South Bend, United States	World Tennis Tour	Hard	(United Kingdom) Johannus Monday	3–6, 5–7
Loss	10–9	Jul 2022	M15 Fountain Valley, United States	World Tennis Tour	Hard	(United States) Zachary Svajda	3–6, 1–6
Loss	10–10	Sep 2022	M15 Champaign, United States	World Tennis Tour	Hard	(Canada) Justin Boulais	1–6, 1–6

=== Doubles: 58 (22–36) ===
Legend (doubles) ATP Challenger Tour (1–11) ITF Futures Tour (21–25)	Finals by surface Hard (14–17) Clay (8–19) Grass (0–0) Carpet (0–0)

Result	W–L	Date	Tournament	Tier	Surface	Partner	Opponents	Score
Loss	0–1	Nov 2009	USA F28, Niceville	Futures	Clay	(United States) Denis Kudla	(Armenia) Tigran Martirosyan (Russia) Artem Sitak	4–6, 5–7
Loss	0–2	Jul 2010	USA F18, Peoria	Futures	Clay	(United States) Jack Sock	(United States) Taylor Fogleman (United States) Benjamin Rogers	2–6, 4–6
Loss	0–3	May 2011	Savannah, United States	Challenger	Clay	(United States) Jesse Witten	(South Africa) Izak van der Merwe (South Africa) Rik de Voest	3–6, 3–6
Win	1–3	Jun 2011	USA F13, Sacramento	Futures	Hard	(France) Alexandre Lacroix	(United States) James Ludlow (United States) Ty Trombetta	6–4, 7–6^{(7–3)}
Loss	1–4	Sep 2011	Canada F5, Toronto	Futures	Clay	(Barbados) Darian King	(United States) Maciek Sykut (United States) Denis Zivkovik	2–6, 1–6
Loss	1–5	Oct 2011	USA F27, Mansfield	Futures	Hard	(United States) Blake Strode	(United States) Devin Britton (United States) Jordan Cox	6–2, 2–6, [7–10]
Loss	1–6	Oct 2011	USA F28, Birmingham	Futures	Clay	(United States) Evan King	(Romania) Andre Daescu (Canada) Milan Pokrajac	2–6, 2–6
Loss	1–7	Jan 2012	USA F2, Sunrise	Futures	Clay	(United Kingdom) Edward Corrie	(Philippines) Ruben Gonzales (United States) Chris Kwon	3–6, 5–7
Loss	1–8	Jul 2012	USA F19, Rochester	Futures	Clay	(United Kingdom) Vahid Mirzadeh	(Philippines) Chase Buchanan (United States) Drew Courtney	3–6, 0–6
Loss	1–9	Sep 2012	Canada F7, Toronto	Futures	Clay	(United States) Bjorn Fratangelo	(Australia) Carsten Ball (Canada) Peter Polansky	7–6^{(7–2)}, 4–6, [9–11]
Win	2–9	Dec 2012	Hong Kong F3	Futures	Hard	(United States) Daniel Nguyen	(New Zealand) Marcus Daniell (Australia) Kaden Hensel	6–4, 6–2
Loss	2–10	Jan 2013	USA F3, Weston	Futures	Clay	(United States) Patrick Daciek	(Brazil) Daniel Dutra da Silva (Brazil) Caio Zampieri	6–7^{(4–7)}, 2–6
Loss	2–11	Jun 2013	USA F14, Innisbrook	Futures	Clay	(United States) Eric Quigley	(El Salvador) Marcelo Arévalo (Venezuela) Roberto Maytín	6–3, 4–6, [7–10]
Win	3–11	Sep 2013	Canada F7, Toronto	Futures	Clay	(United States) Jean-Yves Aubone	(Canada) Milan Pokrajak (Canada) Peter Polansky	6–4, 6–4
Win	4–11	Sep 2013	Canada F9, Markham	Futures	Hard	(United States) Evan King	(Mexico) Hans Hach (Canada) Andrew Ochotta	6–3, 6–2
Loss	4–12	Oct 2013	USA F28, Birmingham	Futures	Clay	(United States) Evan King	(France) Romain Arneodo (Monaco) Benjamin Belleret	7–6^{(7–4)}, 4–6, [7–10]
Loss	4–13	Nov 2013	USA F29, Pensacola	Futures	Clay	(United States) Devin McCarthy	(Trinidad and Tobago) Joseph Cadogan (United States) Patrick Daciek	3–6, 6–2, [3–10]
Win	5–13	Nov 2013	USA F31, Bradenton	Futures	Clay	(United States) Stefan Kozlov	(Canada) Tommy Mylnikov (United States) Devin McCarthy	6–2, 6–4
Win	6–13	Mar 2014	USA F8, Bakersfield	Futures	Hard	(United States) Evan King	(Poland) Adam Chadaj (Czech Republic) Marek Michalička	5–7, 6–4, [10–5]
Win	7–13	Mar 2014	USA F9, Calabasas	Futures	Hard	(United States) Evan King	(United States) Dennis Novikov (United States) Connor Smith	6–4, 6–4
Loss	7–14	Jun 2014	Italy F20, Busto Arsizio	Futures	Clay	(Brazil) Daniel Dutra da Silva	(Brazil) Fabrício Neis (Brazil) Pedro Sakamoto	6–4, 1–6, [8–10]
Win	8–14	Sep 2014	Canada F9, Toronto	Futures	Clay	(United States) Evan King	(United States) Bjorn Fratangelo (United States) Mitchell Krueger	6–4, 4–6, [11–9]
Loss	8–15	Sep 2014	Canada F10, Toronto	Futures	Hard	(Canada) Pavel Krainik	(France) Michael Bois (Canada) Isade Juneau	4–6, 6–4, [5–10]
Win	9–15	Dec 2014	Dominican Republic F4, Santo Domingo	Futures	Hard	(United States) Mitchell Krueger	(Peru) Mauricio Echazú (Bulgaria) Aleksandar Lazov	6–7^{(1–7)}, 6–1, [10–8]
Win	10–15	Mar 2015	USA F10, Bakersfield	Futures	Hard	(Barbados) Darian King	(United States) Mitchell Krueger (United States) Connor Smith	6–4, 4–6, [10–7]
Win	11–15	May 2015	USA F16, Tampa	Futures	Clay	(United States) Brandon Anandan	(United States) Jean-Yves Aubone (United States) Rhyne Williams	7–6^{(7–4)}, 7–6^{(7–4)}
Win	12–15	Jun 2015	USA F17, Buffalo	Futures	Clay	(United States) Nathan Pasha	(Argentina) Maximiliano Estévez (Mexico) Daniel Garza	walkover
Loss	12–16	Jul 2015	Winnetka, United States	Challenger	Hard	(Canada) Frank Dancevic	(Sweden) Johan Brunström (United States) Nicholas Monroe	6–4, 3–6, [8–10]
Loss	12–17	Nov 2015	Knoxville, United States	Challenger	Hard	(United States) Matthew Seeberger	(Sweden) Johan Brunström (Denmark) Fredrik Nielsen	1–6, 2–6
Win	13–17	Nov 2015	USA F34, Waco	Futures	Hard	(United States) Matthew Seeberger	(Germany) Julian Lenz (United States) William Little	1–6, 6–3, [10–6]
Loss	13–18	Feb 2016	Dallas, United States	Challenger	Hard	(South Africa) Dean O'Brien	(United States) Eric Quigley (United States) Nicolas Meister	1–6, 1–6
Loss	13–19	Mar 2016	USA F10, Bakersfield	Futures	Hard	(Philippines) Ruben Gonzales	(France) Adrien Puget (United States) Nicolas Meister	5–7, 3-6
Win	14–19	Jul 2016	USA F23, Wichita	Futures	Hard	(Barbados) Darian King	(United States) Eric Quigley (United States) Nicolas Meister	6–2, 6–3
Loss	14–20	Jul 2016	Winnetka, United States	Challenger	Hard	(Republic of Ireland) David O'Hare	(United States) Stefan Kozlov (Australia) John-Patrick Smith	3–6, 3–6
Loss	14–21	Oct 2016	Fairfield, United States	Challenger	Hard	(United States) Eric Quigley	(United States) Brian Baker (United States) Mackenzie McDonald	3–6, 4–6
Loss	14–22	Jun 2017	Vicenza, Italy	Challenger	Clay	(Austria) Tristan-Samuel Weissborn	(Germany) Gero Kretschmer (Germany) Alexander Satschko	4–6, 6–7^{(4–7)}
Loss	14–23	Aug 2017	Floridablanca, Colombia	Challenger	Clay	(United States) Evan King	(Peru) Sergio Galdós (Chile) Nicolás Jarry	3–6, 7–5, [1–10]
Loss	14–24	Feb 2018	Launceston, Australia	Challenger	Hard	(United States) Nathan Pasha	(Australia) Alex Bolt (Australia) Bradley Mousley	6–7^{(6–8)}, 0-6
Win	15–24	Apr 2018	Italy F9, Santa Margherita	Futures	Clay	(Poland) Szymon Walków	(Romania) Vasile Antonescu (Romania) Patrick Grigoriu	6–4, 6–4
Win	16–24	May 2018	Poland F3, Ustroń	Futures	Clay	(Poland) Szymon Walków	(Czech Republic) Vít Kopřiva (Czech Republic) David Poljak	0–6, 6–1, [10–4]
Loss	16–25	Jul 2018	Netherlands F3, Amstelveen	Futures	Clay	(Romania) Vasile Antonescu	(Netherlands) Michiel De Krom (Netherlands) Ryan Nijboer	7–6^{(7–0)}, 3–6, [5–10]
Win	17–25	Mar 2019	M25 Calabasas, United States	World Tennis Tour	Hard	(Bolivia) Boris Arias	(United Kingdom) Jack Findel-Hawkins (United Kingdom) Ryan Peniston	6–2, 6–2
Loss	17–26	May 2019	M25 Vero Beach, United States	World Tennis Tour	Clay	(Bolivia) Boris Arias	(Italy) Lorenzo Frigerio (Italy) Adelchi Virgili	4–6, 3–6
Win	18–26	Sep 2019	Cary, United States	Challenger	Hard	(United States) Michael Mmoh	(Philippines) Treat Huey (Australia) John-Patrick Smith	4–6, 6–4, [10–8]
Win	19–26	Oct 2019	M25 Norman, United States	World Tennis Tour	Hard	(United Kingdom) Lloyd Glasspool	(United States) Yates Johnson (United States) Hunter Johnson	7–6^{(11–9)}, 6–2
Loss	19–27	Nov 2019	Charlottesville, United States	Challenger	Hard	(Slovenia) Blaž Kavčič	(United States) Mitchell Krueger (Slovenia) Blaž Rola	4–6, 1–6
Loss	19–28	Jan 2020	M25 Rancho Santa Fe, United States	World Tennis Tour	Hard	(Bolivia) Boris Arias	(United Kingdom) Lloyd Glasspool (United States) Alex Lawson	1–6, 6–7^{(1–7)}
Loss	19−29	Apr 2021	Tallahassee, United States	Challenger	Clay	(United States) Donald Young	(Brazil) Orlando Luz (Brazil) Rafael Matos	6–7^{(2–7)}, 2-6
Loss	19–30	Sep 2021	M15 Fayetteville, United States	World Tennis Tour	Hard	(Ghana) Abraham Asaba	(France) Alexandre Reco (France) Nicolas Rousset	3–6, 6–3, [6−10]
Win	20–30	Oct 2021	M15 Lubbock, United States	World Tennis Tour	Hard	(Netherlands) Gijs Brouwer	(Germany) Constantin Frantzen (Slovenia) Sven Lah	6–4, 4–6, [10−5]
Win	21–30	Apr 2022	M15 Orange Park, United States	World Tennis Tour	Clay	(Ghana) Abraham Asaba	(United States) Aidan Mayo (United States) Govind Nanda	7–6^{(2−7)}, 3–6, [11−9]
Loss	21–31	Jun 2022	M25 East Lansing, United States	World Tennis Tour	Hard	(United States) Noah Schachter	(Japan) Shunsuke Mitsui (Japan) James Trotter	5–7, 3–6
Loss	21–32	Jun 2022	M25 Wichita, United States	World Tennis Tour	Hard	(Ghana) Abraham Asaba	(Chinese Taipei) Hsu Yu Hsiou (Japan) Yuta Shimizu	4–6, 6–2, [5−10]
Loss	21–33	Jul 2022	M15 Fountain Valley, United States	World Tennis Tour	Hard	(Ghana) Abraham Asaba	(United States) Ethan Quinn (Paraguay) Adolfo Daniel Vallejo	0–6, 6–3, [8−10]
Loss	21–34	Jan 2023	M25 Wesley Chapel, United States	World Tennis Tour	Hard	(Israel) Roy Stepanov	(Dominican Republic) Roberto Cid Subervi (United States) Alfredo Perez	3–6, 2–6
Loss	21–35	Mar 2023	M25 Bakersfield, United States	World Tennis Tour	Hard	(United Kingdom) Blu Baker	(United States) Vasil Kirkov (United States) Christian Langmo	5–7, 6–7^{(2–7)}
Win	22–35	Apr 2023	M15 Sunrise, United States	World Tennis Tour	Hard	(United Kingdom) Blu Baker	(United States) Jared Thompkins (United States) Leonardo Vega	6–3, 6–1
Loss	22–36	May 2023	M25 Pensacola, United States	World Tennis Tour	Clay	(Israel) Roy Stepanov	(United States) Vasil Kirkov (Canada) Benjamin Sigouin	3–6, 6–4, [8–10]
