= Hady Habib =

Lebanese tennis player (born 1998)

- Native name: هادي حبيب
- Country (sports): United States (–Jun 2018); Lebanon (Jun 2018 – present Davis Cup since 2015, Olympics since 2024)
- Born: 21 August 1998 (age 28) Houston, Texas, U.S.
- Height: 1.88 m (6 ft 2 in)
- Plays: Right-handed (two-handed backhand)
- College: Texas A&M
- Prize money: US $549,111

Singles
- Career record: 11–15 (at ATP Tour level, Grand Slam level, and in Davis Cup)
- Career titles: 0
- Highest ranking: No. 159 (5 May 2025)
- Current ranking: No. 351 (13 April 2026)

Grand Slam singles results
- Australian Open: 2R (2025)
- French Open: Q2 (2025)
- Wimbledon: Q2 (2025)
- US Open: Q1 (2025)

Other tournaments
- Olympic Games: 1R (2024)

Doubles
- Career record: 3–7 (at ATP Tour level, Grand Slam level, and in Davis Cup)
- Career titles: 0
- Highest ranking: No. 274 (23 December 2024)
- Current ranking: No. 531 (13 April 2026)

Other doubles tournaments
- Olympic Games: 1R (2024)

Team competitions
- Davis Cup: 19–10
- Last updated on: 15 April 2026.

Hady Habib (Arabic: هادي حبيب; born 21 August 1998) is an American-born Lebanese professional tennis player. He has a career high ATP singles ranking of world No. 159 achieved on 5 May 2025 and a doubles ranking of No. 274 achieved on 23 December 2024. Habib won one ATP Challenger Tour singles and three doubles titles. He is currently the No. 1 player from Lebanon.

== Early life ==
Habib was born in Houston to a Lebanese father and an American Iranian mother. Habib is fluent in English and Arabic.

At the age of six he moved to Beirut, Lebanon with his family and began playing tennis there at nine years old. Along with tennis, Habib also played basketball and competed in swimming competitions while based in Lebanon. As a 12 year old he returned to the United States in an attempt to further his tennis prospects and first based himself in southern California before settling in Florida at the IMG Academy.

== College ==
In 2021, Habib graduated with a degree in Sports Management from Texas A&M University in College Station.

== Career ==
=== 2024: Historic Olympics debut & first Challenger title for Lebanon ===
Habib became the first Lebanese tennis player to compete at the Olympics when he took part in the Paris Games, losing in the singles first round on the event's opening day to second seed Carlos Alcaraz in straight sets. He also took part in the doubles event partnering Benjamin Hassan.

At the Challenger Temuco, Habib won his first ATP Challenger Tour singles title, becoming the first Lebanese player in history to win a Challenger trophy in singles.

=== 2025: Historic debut and first win at the Australian Open, top 200 ===
Habib became the first Lebanese player, male or female, to qualify for the main draw of a Grand Slam in the Open Era, defeating Patrick Kypson, Tseng Chun-hsin and Clément Chidekh in the qualifying competition of the Australian Open. Ranked No. 219, he then defeated Bu Yunchaokete in the first round to become the first Lebanese player to win a match in the main draw of a Major. As a result he moved more than 50 positions up and reached the top 200 in the singles rankings at world No. 166 on 27 January 2025. Habib lost to Ugo Humbert in the second round.

== Performance timeline ==
Key
W	F	SF	QF	#R	RR	Q#	DNQ	A	NH

(W) winner; (F) finalist; (SF) semifinalist; (QF) quarterfinalist; (#R) rounds 4, 3, 2, 1; (RR) round-robin stage; (Q#) qualification round; (DNQ) did not qualify; (A) absent; (NH) not held; (SR) strike rate (events won / competed); (W–L) win–loss record.
To avoid confusion and double counting, these charts are updated at the conclusion of a tournament or when the player's participation has ended.

=== Singles ===
Tournament	2025	2026	SR	W–L	Win%
Grand Slam tournaments
Australian Open	2R	Q1	0 / 1	1–1	50%
French Open	Q2		0 / 0	0–0	–
Wimbledon	Q2		0 / 0	0–0	–
US Open	Q1		0 / 0	0–0	–
Win–loss	1–1	0–0	0 / 1	0–1	50%
ATP Masters 1000
Indian Wells Masters	Q1		0 / 0	0–0	–
Miami Open	Q1		0 / 0	0–0	–
Monte Carlo Masters	A		0 / 0	0–0	–
Madrid Open	A		0 / 0	0-0	–
Italian Open	A		0 / 0	0–0	–
Canadian Open	A		0 / 0	0–0	–
Cincinnati Masters	A		0 / 0	0–0	–
Shanghai Masters	A		0 / 0	0–0	–
Paris Masters	A		0 / 0	0–0	–
Win–loss	0–0	0–0	0 / 0	0–0	–

== Davis Cup ==
Habib has represented Lebanon at the Davis Cup, where he has a win–loss record of 19–7 in singles and a 5–7 record in doubles. In 2015, Habib elected to begin representing Lebanon when he was selected to debut for the Lebanese Davis Cup team in their Asia/Oceania Group II semifinal tie against Sri Lanka.

Legend
Group membership
World Group (0)
Group I (0–6)
Group II (7–2)
Group III (12–2)
Group IV (0)

- ▲ ▼ indicates the outcome of the Davis Cup match followed by the score, date, place of event, the zonal classification and its phase, and the court surface.

Rubber outcome	Rubber	Match type (partner if any)	Opponent nation	Opponent player(s)	Score
▼2–3; 17–19 July 2015; Sri Lanka Tennis Association Complex, Colombo, Sri Lanka; Group II Asia/Oceania play-offs; clay surface
Defeat	II	Singles	Sri Lanka	Harshana Godamanna	7–5, 6–3, 6–3
Victory	III	Doubles (with Giovani Samaha)	Sri Lanka	Harshana Godamanna; Dineshkanthan Thangarajah	7–6^{(7–4)}, 2–6, 6–3, 3–6, 6–3
Victory	IV	Singles	Sri Lanka	Sharmal Dissanayake	7–5, 6–4, 4–6, 4–6, 6–3
▲3–0; 11 July 2016; Enghelab Sports Complex, Tehran, Iran; Group III Asia/Oceania first round; clay surface
Victory	I	Singles	Cambodia	Nysan Tan	6–2, 6–2
Victory	III	Doubles (with Jad Ballout)	Cambodia	Phalkun Mam; Nysan Tan	6–4, 6–3
▲3–0; 13 July 2016; Enghelab Sports Complex, Tehran, Iran; Group III Asia/Oceania first round; clay surface
Victory	I	Singles	Singapore	Hao Yuan Ng	6–2, 6–2
▲3–0; 14 July 2016; Enghelab Sports Complex, Tehran, Iran; Group III Asia/Oceania first round; clay surface
Victory	I	Singles	Qatar	Mousa Shanan Zayed	6–1, 6–0
▲3–0; 15 July 2016; Enghelab Sports Complex, Tehran, Iran; Group III Asia/Oceania first round; clay surface
Victory	I	Singles	Syria	Amer Naow	6–2, 6–3
Victory	III	Doubles (with Jad Ballout)	Syria	Kareem Al Allaf; Amer Naow	6–2, 6–3
▼1–2; 16 July 2016; Enghelab Sports Complex, Tehran, Iran; Group III Asia/Oceania play-offs; clay surface
Victory	I	Singles	Hong Kong	Anthony Jackie Tang	6–3, 6–2
Defeat	III	Doubles (with Jad Ballout)	Hong Kong	Karan Rastogi; Wong Chun-hun	3–6, 4–6
▲2–1; 17 July 2017; Sri Lanka Tennis Association, Colombo, Sri Lanka; Group III Asia/Oceania first round; clay surface
Victory	I	Singles	Turkmenistan	Georgiy Pochay	6–0, 6–1
▲2–1; 18 July 2017; Sri Lanka Tennis Association, Colombo, Sri Lanka; Group III Asia/Oceania first round; clay surface
Victory	I	Singles	United Arab Emirates	Omar Al-Awadhi	6–3, 7–5
Defeat	III	Doubles (with Jad Ballout)	United Arab Emirates	Fahad Janahi; Hamad Abbas Janahi	3–6, 5–7
▲2–1; 19 July 2017; Sri Lanka Tennis Association, Colombo, Sri Lanka; Group III Asia/Oceania first round; clay surface
Victory	I	Singles	Malaysia	Christian Didier Chin	6–2, 6–4
▲3–0; 20 July 2017; Sri Lanka Tennis Association, Colombo, Sri Lanka; Group III Asia/Oceania first round; clay surface
Victory	I	Singles	Qatar	Jabor Al-Mutawa	6–1, 6–1
▲2–0; 22 July 2017; Sri Lanka Tennis Association, Colombo, Sri Lanka; Group III Asia/Oceania play-offs; clay surface
Victory	I	Singles	Jordan	Hamzeh Al-Aswad	6–2, 6–0
▲3–2; 3–4 February 2018; Taadod Sports Academy, Beirut, Lebanon; Group II Asia/Oceania first round; hard (indoor) surface
Victory	II	Singles	Chinese Taipei	Lee Kuan-yi	6–4, 6–3
Victory	III	Doubles (with Giovani Samaha)	Chinese Taipei	Chen Ti; Yu Cheng-yu	6–1, 7–5
▲3–1; 7–8 April 2018; Notre Dame University – Louaize, Zouk Mosbeh, Lebanon; Group II Asia/Oceania second round; hard surface
Victory	II	Singles	Hong Kong	Wong Chun-hun	6–4, 1–6, 6–4
Defeat	III	Doubles (with Giovani Samaha)	Hong Kong	Wong Chun-hun; Yeung Pak-long	2–6, 4–6
▲3–2; 15–16 September 2018; The National Tennis Development Center, Nonthaburi, Thailand; Group II Asia/Oceania third round; hard surface
Victory	I	Singles	Thailand	Wishaya Trongcharoenchaikul	4–6, 7–6^{(7–2)}, 5–3 ret.
Victory	V	Singles	Thailand	Palaphoom Kovapitukted	6–3, 6–3
▼2–3; 13–14 September 2019; Automobile and Touring Club of Lebanon, Jounieh, Lebanon; Group I Asia/Oceania; clay surface
Defeat	I	Singles	Uzbekistan	Sanjar Fayziev	4–6, 4–6
Defeat	V	Singles	Uzbekistan	Jurabek Karimov	4–6, 6–1, 1–6
▼0–4; 18–19 September 2021; Automobile and Touring Club of Lebanon, Jounieh, Lebanon; World Group I; clay surface
Defeat	II	Singles	Brazil	Felipe Meligeni Alves	1–6, 3–6
Defeat	III	Doubles (with Benjamin Hassan)	Brazil	Marcelo Demoliner; Rafael Matos	2–6, 6–3, 6–7^{(5–7)}
▼1–3; 4–5 March 2022; Jan Group Arena, Biel/Bienne, Switzerland; World Group I qualifying round; hard (indoor) surface
Defeat	II	Singles	Switzerland	Henri Laaksonen	7–5, 3–6, 3–6
Defeat	III	Doubles (with Benjamin Hassan)	Switzerland	Marc-Andrea Hüsler; Dominic Stricker	4–6, 6–7^{(3–7)}

== ATP Challenger Tour finals ==
=== Singles: 3 (1 title, 2 runner-ups) ===
Legend ATP Challenger Tour (1–2)

Result	W–L	Date	Tournament	Tier	Surface	Opponent	Score
Loss	0–1	May 2024	Santos, Brazil	Challenger	Clay	(Argentina) Alejo Lingua Lavallén	6–4, 4–6, 3–6
Win	1–1	Dec 2024	Temuco, Chile	Challenger	Hard	(Argentina) Camilo Ugo Carabelli	6–4, 6–7^{(3–7)}, 7–6^{(7–2)}
Loss	1–2	Apr 2025	Ostrava, Czech Republic	Challenger	Clay	(Hungary) Zsombor Piros	3–6, 2–6

=== Doubles: 4 (3 titles, 1 runner-up) ===
Legend ATP Challenger Tour (3–1)	Finals by surface Hard (0–0) Clay (3–1)

Result	W–L	Date	Tournament	Tier	Surface	Partner	Opponents	Score
Loss	0–1	May 2024	Santos, Brazil	Challenger	Clay	(United States) Trey Hilderbrand	(Israel) Roy Stepanov (Colombia) Andrés Urrea	walkover
Win	1–1	Jun 2024	Santa Fe, Argentina	Challenger	Clay	(United States) Trey Hilderbrand	(Uruguay) Ignacio Carou (Argentina) Facundo Mena	6–7^{(5–7)}, 6–2, [10–4]
Win	2–1	Jun 2024	Lima, Peru	Challenger	Clay	(United States) Trey Hilderbrand	(Brazil) Pedro Boscardin Dias (Brazil) Pedro Sakamoto	7–5, 6–3
Win	3–1	Jun 2024	Santa Cruz de la Sierra II, Bolivia	Challenger	Clay	(United States) Trey Hilderbrand	(New Zealand) Finn Reynolds (Chile) Matías Soto	3–6, 6–3, [10–7]

== ITF Futures/World Tennis Tour finals ==
=== Singles: 17 (10 titles, 7 runner-ups) ===
Legend ITF Futures/WTT (10–7)	Finals by surface Hard (9–5) Clay (1–2)

Result	W–L	Date	Tournament	Tier	Surface	Opponent	Score
Win	1–0	May 2018	Tunisia F20, Djerba	Futures	Hard	(Tunisia) Moez Echargui	7–6^{(8–6)}, 6–4
Loss	1–1	Jun 2019	M15 Cancun, Mexico	WTT	Hard	(Mexico) Gerardo López Villaseñor	6–7^{(2–7)}, 4–6
Win	2–1	Oct 2021	M15 Cairo, Egypt	WTT	Clay	(Italy) Lorenzo Rottoli	6–3, 6–4
Win	3–1	Oct 2021	M15 Sharm El Sheikh, Egypt	WTT	Hard	(Austria) Lukas Krainer	6–2, 6–4
Loss	3–2	Oct 2021	M15 Sharm El Sheikh, Egypt	WTT	Hard	(Vietnam) Lý Hoàng Nam	2–6, 4–6
Win	4–2	Dec 2021	M15 Doha, Qatar	WTT	Hard	(India) Sasikumar Mukund	6–2, 4–6, 6–3
Win	5–2	Feb 2022	M25 Sharm El Sheikh, Egypt	WTT	Hard	(Czech Republic) Lukáš Rosol	6–4, 6–4
Loss	5–3	Jun 2022	M25 Kiseljak, Bosnia and Herzegovina	WTT	Clay	(Belgium) Joris De Loore	4–6, 7–5, 3–6
Loss	5–4	Oct 2022	M15 Monastir, Tunisia	WTT	Hard	(Portugal) Jaime Faria	5–7, 4–6
Win	6–4	May 2023	M15 Monastir, Tunisia	WTT	Hard	(France) Adrien Gobat	6–2, 6–4
Win	7–4	Jun 2023	M15 Monastir, Tunisia	WTT	Hard	(Japan) Ryuki Matsuda	6–2, 6–3
Win	8–4	Jun 2023	M15 Monastir, Tunisia	WTT	Hard	(Hong Kong) Coleman Wong	6–3, 6–3
Win	9–4	Sep 2023	M25 Sharm El Sheikh, Egypt	WTT	Hard	(South Africa) Kris van Wyk	6–4, 6–4
Loss	9–5	Nov 2023	M25 Monastir, Tunisia	WTT	Hard	(France) Clément Tabur	6–3, 3–6, 4–6
Win	10–5	Nov 2023	M25 Monastir, Tunisia	WTT	Hard	(Latvia) Robert Strombachs	6–4, 6–4
Loss	10–6	Mar 2024	M25 Quinta do Lago, Portugal	WTT	Hard	(Portugal) Jaime Faria	7–6^{(8–6)}, 6–7^{(3–7)}, 1–6
Loss	10–7	May 2024	M25 Pensacola, USA	WTT	Clay	(Ecuador) Andrés Andrade	6–7^{(5–7)}, 5–7

=== Doubles: 6 (2 titles, 4 runner-ups) ===
Legend ITF Futures/WTT (2–4)	Finals by surface Hard (1–2) Clay (1–2)

Result	W–L	Date	Tournament	Tier	Surface	Partner	Opponents	Score
Win	1–0	Jul 2017	Sri Lanka F3, Colombo	Futures	Clay	(India) Ankit Chopra	(India) Chandril Sood (India) Lakshit Sood	2–6, 7–5, [10–8]
Loss	1–1	May 2018	Tunisia F19, Djerba	Futures	Hard	(Spain) José Fco. Vidal Azorín	(Tunisia) Anis Ghorbel (Bulgaria) Vasko Mladenov	6–4, 6–7^{(7–9)}, [10–12]
Loss	1–2	Dec 2020	M15 Cairo, Egypt	WTT	Clay	(Spain) José Fco. Vidal Azorín	(Argentina) Juan Bautista Otegui (Argentina) Juan Pablo Paz	4–6, 4–6
Loss	1–3	Oct 2021	M15 Monastir, Tunisia	WTT	Hard	(Argentina) Mateo Martínez	(Australia) Jeremy Beale (Australia) Thomas Fancutt	4–6, 6–7^{(4–7)}
Win	2–3	Oct 2022	M15 Monastir, Tunisia	WTT	Hard	(Tunisia) Anis Ghorbel	(Netherlands) Brian Bozemoj (Netherlands) Jarno Jans	7–6^{(7–5)}, 1–6, [10–8]
Loss	2–4	May 2023	M15 Kursumlijska Banja	WTT	Clay	(Montenegro) Rrezart Cungu	(Argentina) Juan Pablo Paz (Ukraine) Oleksandr Ovcharenko	6–7^{(5–7)}, 4–6
