= Andrés Urrea =

Colombian tennis player (born 1994)

- Country (sports): Colombia
- Born: 31 August 1994 (age 32) Mexico City, Mexico
- Height: 1.75 m (5 ft 9 in)
- Plays: Right-handed (two-handed backhand)
- Coach: Juan Mateus
- Prize money: US $38,089

Singles
- Career record: 0–0
- Career titles: 0
- Highest ranking: No. 1,081 (23 September 2019)
- Current ranking: No. 1,777 (9 November 2026)

Doubles
- Career record: 0–0
- Career titles: 3 Challenger, 0 Futures
- Highest ranking: No. 239 (12 August 2024)
- Current ranking: No. 467 (9 November 2026)
- Last updated on: 9 November 2026.

Andrés Urrea (born 31 August 1994) is a Mexican-born Colombian tennis player. He has a career high ATP doubles ranking of world No. 239 achieved on 12 August 2024 and a career high singles ranking of No. 1,081 achieved on 23 September 2019.

== Career ==
Urrea won his maiden ATP Challenger doubles title at the 2022 Open Bogotá with Nicolás Mejía.

In July 2025, he was given a provisional suspension after failing an anti-doping test at an ATP Challenger event in Colombia in May that year.

== ATP Challenger and ITF Futures finals ==
=== Doubles: 12 (8–4) ===
Legend (doubles) ATP Challenger Tour (3–0) M25 tournaments (5–1) M15 tournaments (0–3) M10 ITF Futures Tour (0–0)	Finals by surface Hard (2–1) Clay (4–3) Grass (0–0)

Result	Date	Tournament	Category	Surface	Partner	Opponents	Score
Loss	Apr 2019	M15 Bucaramanga, Colombia	World Tennis Tour	Clay	(Colombia) Juan Sebastián Gómez	(Argentina) Leonardo Aboian (Argentina) Maximiliano Estevez	6–7^{(1–7)}, 6–2
Loss	Aug 2019	M15 La Paz, Bolivia	World Tennis Tour	Clay	(Brazil) Joao Hinsching	(Bolivia) Boris Arias (Bolivia) Federico Zeballos	2–6, 6–4, [10–12]
Loss	Nov 2021	M15 Guatemala, Guatemala	World Tennis Tour	Hard	(Colombia) Jose Daniel Bendeck	(Venezuela) Brandon Perez (Venezuela) Ricardo Rodriguez	6–76^{(0–7)}, 4–6
Winner	Jul 2022	Bogotá, Colombia	Challenger	Clay	(Colombia) Nicolás Mejía	(Argentina) Ignacio Monzón (Argentina) Gonzalo Villanueva	6–3, 6–4
Winner	Jun 2023	Rionegro, Colombia	Challenger	Clay	(Colombia) Juan Sebastián Gómez	(Brazil) Orlando Luz (Ukraine) Oleg Prihodko	6–3, 7–6^{(12–10)}
Win	Aug 2023	M25 Trujillo, Peru	World Tennis Tour	Clay	(Colombia) Juan Sebastián Gómez	(Argentina) Tomas Farjat (Argentina) Gonzalo Villanueva	7–5, 6–4
Win	Mar 2024	M25 Santo Domingo, Dominican Republic	World Tennis Tour	Hard	(Colombia) Nicolás Mejía	(United Kingdom) Charles Broom (United Kingdom) David Stevenson	7–6^{(7–2)}, 3–6, [10–7]
Win	Mar 2024	M25 Santo Domingo, Dominican Republic	World Tennis Tour	Hard	(Colombia) Nicolás Mejía	(United States) Trey Hilderbrand (United States) Pranav Kumar	6–7^{(5–7)}, 6–4, [10–5]
Loss	Mar 2024	M25 Maceió, Brazil	World Tennis Tour	Clay	(Brazil) Gabriel Roveri Sidney	(Brazil) Luís Britto (Brazil) Paulo André Saraiva dos Santos	3-6, 6–7^{(3–7)}
Winner	May 2024	Santos, Brazil	Challenger	Clay	(Israel) Roy Stepanov	(Lebanon) Hady Habib (United States) Trey Hilderbrand	Walkover
Win	Aug 2024	M25 Arequipa, Peru	World Tennis Tour	Clay	(Chile) Matías Soto	(United States) Pranav Kumar (United States) Noah Schachter	6–3, 7–6^{(7–4)}
Win	Aug 2024	M25 Arequipa, Peru	World Tennis Tour	Clay	(Chile) Matías Soto	(United States) Pranav Kumar (United States) Noah Schachter	6–2, 7–6^{(7–5)}
