= 2026 Santos Brasil Tennis Cup =

- Date: 4–10 May
- Edition: 3rd
- Surface: Clay
- Location: Santos, Brazil

Champions

Singles
- (Uruguay) Franco Roncadelli

Doubles
- (Brazil) Guto Miguel / (Brazil) Luís Felipe Miguel
- Santos Brasil Tennis Cup

The 2026 Santos Brasil Tennis Cup was a professional tennis tournament played on clay courts. It was the third edition of the tournament which was part of the 2026 ATP Challenger Tour. It took place in Santos, Brazil between 4 and 10 May 2026.

== Singles main-draw entrants ==
=== Seeds ===
Country	Player	Rank^{1}	Seed
ARG	Guido Iván Justo	257	1
URU	Franco Roncadelli	273	2
BOL	Murkel Dellien	286	3
ARG	Facundo Mena	290	4
PER	Juan Pablo Varillas	295	5
ARG	Nicolás Kicker	344	6
ARG	Juan Manuel La Serna	362	7
BRA	Matheus Pucinelli de Almeida	377	8

- ^{1} Rankings as of 20 April 2026.

=== Other entrants ===
The following players received wildcards into the singles main draw:

- (Brazil) Gustavo Albieri
- (Brazil) Guto Miguel
- (Brazil) Pedro Rodrigues Longobardi

The following player received entry into the singles main draw as an alternate:

- (Brazil) José Pereira

The following players received entry from the qualifying draw:

- (Brazil) Bruno Fernandez
- (Brazil) Wilson Leite
- (Brazil) Luís Felipe Miguel
- (Argentina) Fermín Tenti
- (Brazil) Rafael Tosetto
- (Brazil) Nicolas Zanellato

== Champions ==
=== Singles ===
- (Uruguay) Franco Roncadelli def. (Argentina) Hernán Casanova 6–3, 6–2.

=== Doubles ===
- (Brazil) Guto Miguel / (Brazil) Luís Felipe Miguel def. (Brazil) Mateus Alves / (Brazil) Pedro Sakamoto 6–3, 6–4.
