= Mateus Alves =

Brazilian tennis player (born 2001)

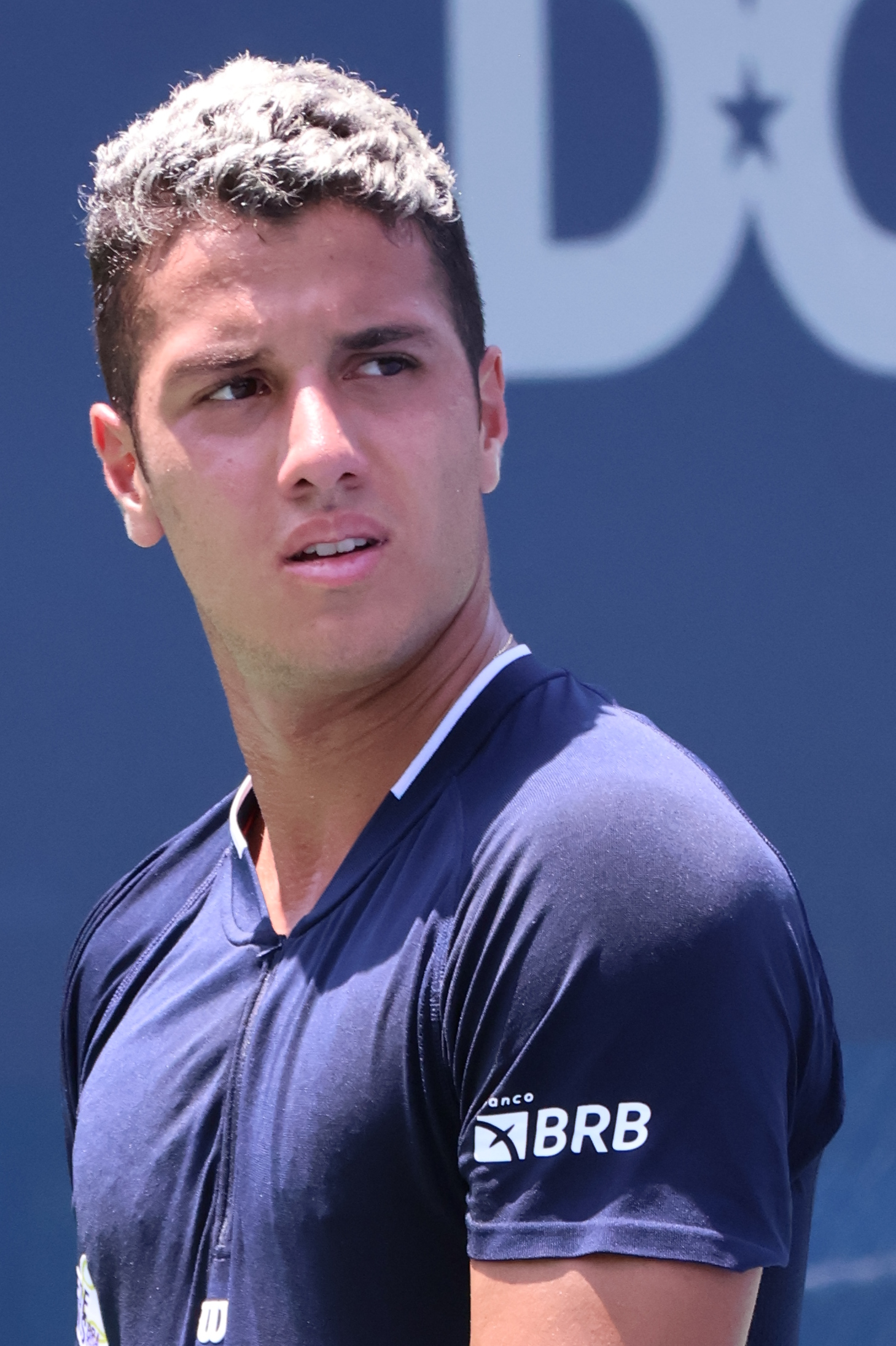
- Alves at the 2023 DC Open
- Full name: Mateus de Carvalho Cardoso Alves
- Country (sports): Brazil
- Residence: São José do Rio Preto, Brazil
- Born: 23 January 2001 (age 25) São José do Rio Preto, Brazil
- Height: 1.93 m (6 ft 4 in)
- Turned pro: 2018
- Plays: Right-handed (two-handed backhand)
- Coach: Duda Matos, Arthur Rabelo
- Prize money: US $275,527

Singles
- Career record: 0–1 (at ATP Tour level, Grand Slam level, and in Davis Cup)
- Career titles: 0
- Highest ranking: No. 271 (18 November 2024)
- Current ranking: No. 399 (19 October 2026)

Grand Slam singles results
- French Open Junior: 2R (2019)

Doubles
- Career record: 0–2 (at ATP Tour level, Grand Slam level, and in Davis Cup)
- Career titles: 0
- Highest ranking: No. 142 (28 October 2024)
- Current ranking: No. 283 (19 October 2026)
- Last updated on: 19 October 2026.

Mateus de Carvalho Cardoso Alves (born 23 January 2001) is a Brazilian tennis player. He has a career high ATP singles ranking of world No. 271 achieved on 18 November 2024 and a doubles ranking of No. 142 achieved on 28 October 2024.

== Career ==
Alves made his ATP main draw debut at the 2019 Rio Open in the doubles draw partnering Thiago Seyboth Wild.

== ATP Challenger Tour finals ==
=== Singles: 1 (1 runner-up) ===
Legend ATP Challenger Tour (0–1)

Result	W–L	Date	Tournament	Tier	Surface	Opponent	Score
Loss	0–1	Aug 2024	Bogotá, Colombia	Challenger	Clay	(Argentina) Facundo Mena	4–6, 5–7

=== Doubles: 7 (5 titles, 2 runner-ups) ===
Legend ATP Challenger Tour (5–2)	Finals by surface Hard (1–0) Clay (4–2)

Result	W–L	Date	Tournament	Surface	Partner	Opponents	Score
Win	1–0	Nov 2021	Brasília, Brazil	Clay	(Brazil) Gustavo Heide	(Italy) Luciano Darderi (Argentina) Genaro Alberto Olivieri	6–3, 6–3
Win	2–0	Nov 2023	Lima II, Peru	Clay	(Brazil) Eduardo Ribeiro	(Colombia) Nicolás Barrientos (Brazil) Orlando Luz	3–6, 7–5, [10–8]
Win	3–0	Nov 2023	Temuco, Chile	Hard	(Chile) Matías Soto	(United States) Aleksandar Kovacevic (United States) Keegan Smith	6–2, 7–5
Win	4–0	Sep 2024	Antofagasta, Chile	Clay	(Chile) Matías Soto	(Argentina) Leonardo Aboian (Argentina) Valerio Aboian	6–1, 6–4
Win	5–0	Oct 2024	Campinas, Brazil	Clay	(Brazil) Orlando Luz	(Chile) Tomás Barrios Vera (Argentina) Facundo Mena	6–3, 6–4
Loss	5–1	Mar 2025	Santiago, Chile	Clay	(Brazil) Luís Britto	(United States) Vasil Kirkov (Chile) Matías Soto	4–6, 3–6
Loss	5–2	May 2026	Santos, Brazil	Clay	(Brazil) Pedro Sakamoto	(Brazil) Guto Miguel (Brazil) Luís Felipe Miguel	3–6, 4–6

== ITF World Tennis Tour finals ==
=== Singles: 15 (11 titles, 4 runner-ups) ===
Legend ITF WTT (11–4)	Finals by surface Hard (3–3) Clay (8–1)

Result	W–L	Date	Tournament	Tier	Surface	Opponent	Score
Win	1–0	Nov 2019	M15 Cancún, Mexico	WTT	Hard	(United States) Nick Chappell	2–6, 6–1, 6–4
Loss	1–1	Jan 2020	M15 Cancún, Mexico	WTT	Hard	(Italy) Alessandro Bega	4–6, 2–6
Win	2–1	Nov 2020	M15 Heraklion, Greece	WTT	Hard	(Bulgaria) Adrian Andreev	7–6^{(8–6)}, 6–4
Loss	2–2	Mar 2021	M15 Monastir, Tunisia	WTT	Hard	(Monaco) Lucas Catarina	7–6^{(7–3)}, 5–7, 4–6
Win	3–2	Feb 2022	M15 Campos do Jordão, Brazil	WTT	Hard	(Peru) Nicolás Álvarez	6–1, 6–4
Win	4–2	Mar 2023	M25 Mosquera, Colombia	WTT	Clay	(Colombia) Johan Alexander Rodríguez	6–2, 7–6^{(7–5)}
Loss	4–3	Mar 2024	M25 Maceió, Brazil	WTT	Clay (i)	(Brazil) Daniel Dutra da Silva	6–4, 5–7, 3–6
Win	5–3	Jul 2024	M25 Marburg, Germany	WTT	Clay	(Belgium) Raphaël Collignon	7–6^{(7–5)}, 1–6, 6–4
Win	6–3	Sep 2025	M25 Cuiabá, Brazil	WTT	Clay	(Brazil) Igor Marcondes	4–6, 6–1, 6–3
Win	7–3	May 2026	M25 Maringa, Brazil	WTT	Clay	(Brazil) Luis Felipe Miguel	6–3, 6–3
Win	8–3	May 2026	M25 Maringa, Brazil	WTT	Clay	(Brazil) Gustavo Ribeiro de Almeida	6–1, 6–4
Win	9–3	Jul 2026	M15 São Paulo, Brazil	WTT	Clay	(Brazil) Gustavo Ribeiro de Almeida	6–3, 7–5
Loss	9–4	Aug 2026	M15 Porto Velho, Brazil	WTT	Hard	(Brazil) Victor Hugo Remondy Pagotto	6–7^{(4–7)}, 5–7
Win	10–4	Sep 2026	M15 Leme, Brazil	WTT	Clay	(Brazil) Pedro Sakamoto	6–3, 6–2
Win	11–4	Sep 2026	M15 Curitiba, Brazil	WTT	Clay	(Brazil) Pedro Sakamoto	6–4, 6–2

=== Doubles: 16 (6 titles, 10 runner-ups) ===
Legend ITF WTT (6–10)	Finals by surface Hard (3–5) Clay (3–5) Grass (0–0) Carpet (0–0)

Result	W–L	Date	Tournament	Tier	Surface	Partner	Opponents	Score
Loss	0–1	Mar 2019	M15 Cancún, Mexico	WTT	Hard	(Brazil) Karue Sell	(Guatemala) Wilfredo González (Dominican Republic) José Olivares	2–6, 7–6^{(7–3)}, [8–10]
Loss	0–2	Jun 2019	M15 São José do Rio Preto, Brazil	WTT	Clay	(Brazil) Christian Oliveira	(Brazil) Oscar Jose Gutierrez (Brazil) Felipe Meligeni Alves	4–6, 6–3, [3–10]
Loss	0–3	Jul 2019	M25 Buenos Aires, Argentina	WTT	Clay	(Chile) Matías Soto	(Argentina) Hernán Casanova (Argentina) Maximiliano Estévez	3–6, 2–6
Win	1–3	Feb 2020	M15 Cancún, Mexico	WTT	Hard	(Brazil) Igor Marcondes	(France) Geoffrey Blancaneaux (France) Gabriel Petit	7–6^{(7–5)}, 7–5
Win	2–3	Sep 2020	M15 Castelo Branco, Portugal	WTT	Hard	(Brazil) Igor Marcondes	(United States) Emilio Nava (United States) Eduardo Nava	7–6^{(7–4)}, 5–7, [10–8]
Loss	2–4	Oct 2020	M15 Setúbal, Portugal	WTT	Hard	(Brazil) Igor Marcondes	(Portugal) Nuno Borges (Portugal) Francisco Cabral	2–6, 7–6^{(7–5)}, [7–10]
Win	3–4	Nov 2020	M15 Heraklion, Greece	WTT	Clay	(Argentina) Facundo Díaz Acosta	(France) Corentin Denolly (France) Jonathan Eysseric	4–6, 6–3, [10–4]
Loss	3–5	Mar 2021	M15 Monastir, Tunisia	WTT	Hard	(Brazil) Igor Marcondes	(Tunisia) Anis Ghorbel (Italy) Luca Potenza	4–6, 1–6
Loss	3–6	Apr 2021	M15 Monastir, Tunisia	WTT	Clay	(Brazil) Igor Marcondes	(Italy) Franco Agamenone (Poland) Piotr Matuszewski	6–7^{(7–9)}, 5–7
Win	4–6	May 2021	M25 Vic, Spain	WTT	Clay	(Brazil) Oscar Jose Gutierrez	(France) Corentin Denolly (Belgium) Michael Geerts	7–6^{(7–3)}, 6–2
Win	5–6	Jul 2021	M25+H Ajaccio, France	WTT	Hard	(France) Arthur Bouquier	(France) Lisandru Rodriguez (Italy) Alessio Tramontin	6–4, 7–6^{(9–7)}
Win	6–6	Aug 2021	M25 Muttenz, Switzerland	WTT	Clay	(Brazil) Oscar Jose Gutierrez	(Switzerland) Nicolás Parizzia (Switzerland) Gabriele Moghini	6–3, 6–4
Loss	6–7	Sep 2021	M25 Sintra, Portugal	WTT	Hard	(Brazil) Leonardo Telles	(United Kingdom) Evan Hoyt (France) Dan Added	7–6^{(10–8)}, 2–6, [6–10]
Loss	6–8	Sep 2021	M25 Johannesburg, South Africa	WTT	Hard	(Brazil) Igor Marcondes	(Israel) Daniel Cukierman (United Kingdom) Alastair Gray	6–7^{(5–7)}, 3–6
Loss	6–9	Oct 2025	M25 Lajeado, Brazil	WTT	Clay	(Brazil) Eduardo Ribeiro	(United States) Bruno Kuzuhara (Brazil) João Eduardo Schiessl	4–7, 7–6^{(7–4)}, [8–10]
Loss	6–10	Nov 2025	M25 Santa Cruz do Sul, Brazil	WTT	Clay	(Brazil) Eduardo Ribeiro	(Brazil) João Victor Couto Loureiro (Brazil) João Eduardo Schiessl	3–6, 2–6
