= Pedro Boscardin Dias =

Brazilian tennis player (born 2003)

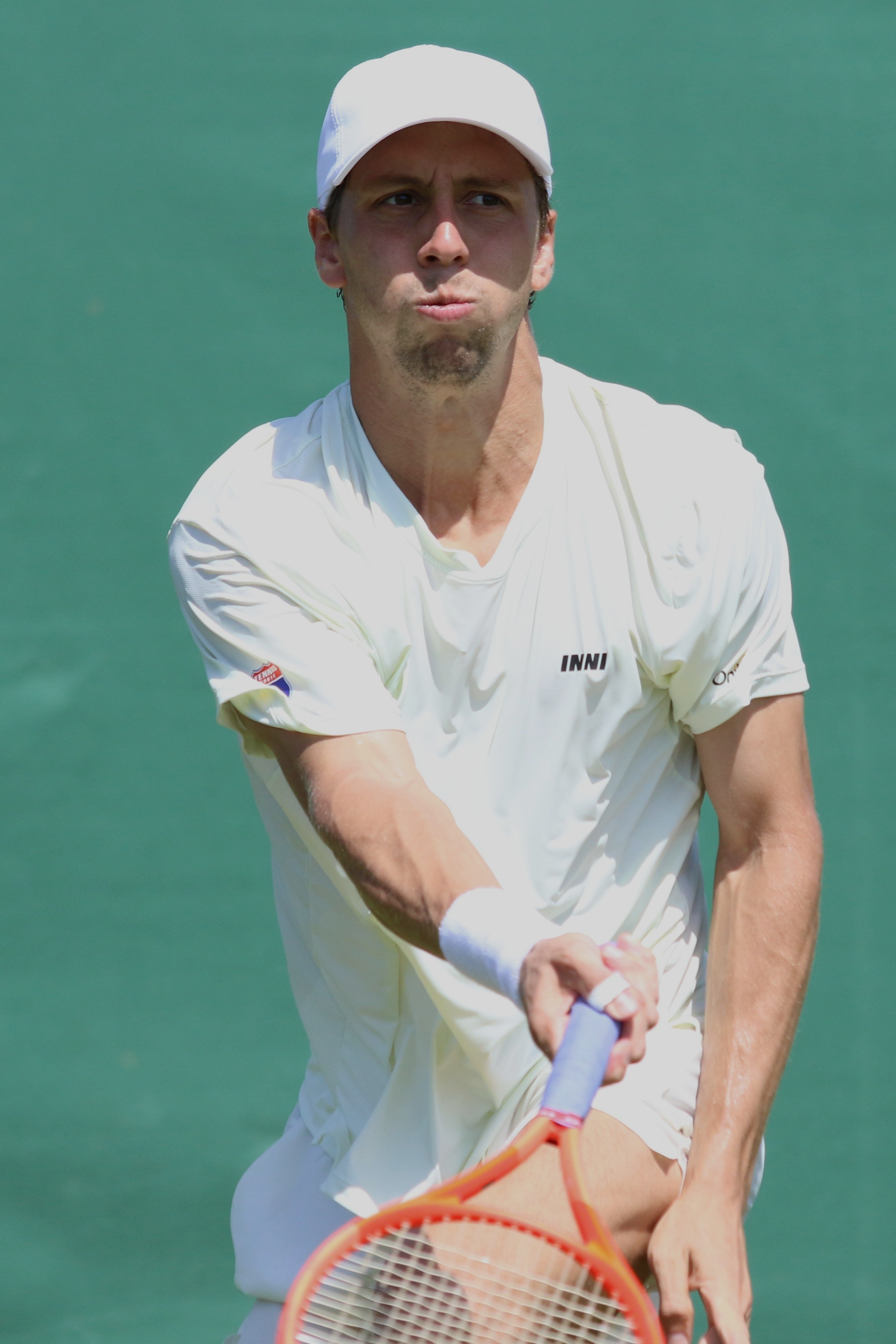
- Boscardin Dias at the 2026 Wimbledon Championships
- Country (sports): Brazil
- Born: 28 January 2003 (age 23) Joinville, Brazil
- Height: 1.80 m (5 ft 11 in)
- Plays: Right-handed (two-handed backhand)
- Prize money: US $250,408

Singles
- Career record: 0–0
- Career titles: 0
- Highest ranking: No. 222 (20 April 2026)
- Current ranking: No. 244 (22 June 2026)

Grand Slam singles results
- French Open: Q2 (2026)
- Wimbledon: Q1 (2026)

Doubles
- Career record: 0–0
- Career titles: 0; 4 Challenger
- Highest ranking: No. 174 (27 November 2023)
- Current ranking: No. 291 (22 June 2026)
- Last updated on: 22 June 2026.

Pedro Boscardin Dias (born 28 January 2003) is a Brazilian professional tennis player. He has a career-high ATP singles ranking of No. 222 achieved on 20 April 2026 and a doubles ranking of No. 174, reached on 27 November 2023. He is currently the No. 4 singles player from Brazil.

Boscardin Dias plays mostly on the ATP Challenger Tour, where he has won four titles in doubles.

He had good results on the ITF junior circuit, maintaining a 78–38 singles win-loss record and reached an ITF junior combined ranking of world No. 6 on 8 March 2021.

== Performance timeline ==
Key
W	F	SF	QF	#R	RR	Q#	DNQ	A	NH

(W) winner; (F) finalist; (SF) semifinalist; (QF) quarterfinalist; (#R) rounds 4, 3, 2, 1; (RR) round-robin stage; (Q#) qualification round; (DNQ) did not qualify; (A) absent; (NH) not held; (SR) strike rate (events won / competed); (W–L) win–loss record.

=== Singles ===
Tournament	2026	SR	W–L	Win%
Grand Slam tournaments
Australian Open	A	0 / 0	0–0	–
French Open	Q2	0 / 0	0–0	–
Wimbledon	Q1	0 / 0	0–0	–
US Open		0 / 0	0–0	–
Win–loss	0–0	0 / 0	0–0	–

== ATP Challenger Tour finals ==
=== Singles: 3 (3 runner-ups) ===
Legend ATP Challenger Tour (0–3)

Result	W–L	Date	Tournament	Tier	Surface	Opponent	Score
Loss	0–1	May 2022	Challenger de Coquimbo, Chile	Challenger	Clay	(Argentina) Facundo Díaz Acosta	5–7, 6–7^{(4–7)}
Loss	0–2	Jun 2024	Lima Challenger, Peru	Challenger	Clay	(Argentina) Juan Manuel Cerúndolo	4–6, 3–6
Loss	0–3	Oct 2025	Curitiba Challenger, Brazil	Challenger	Clay	(Paraguay) Daniel Vallejo	3–6, 5–7

=== Doubles: 6 (4 titles, 2 runner-ups) ===
Legend ATP Challenger Tour (4–2)	Finals by surface Hard (–) Clay (4–2)

Result	W–L	Date	Tournament	Tier	Surface	Partner	Opponents	Score
Win	1–0	Mar 2023	Challenger de Santiago, Chile	Challenger	Clay	(Brazil) João Lucas Reis da Silva	(Ecuador) Diego Hidalgo (Colombia) Cristian Rodríguez	6–4, 3–6, [10–7]
Win	2–0	Apr 2023	Florianópolis Challenger, Brazil	Challenger	Clay	(Brazil) Gustavo Heide	(Brazil) Christian Oliveira (Brazil) Pedro Sakamoto	6–2, 7–5
Win	3–0	Aug 2023	RD Open, Dominican Republic	Challenger	Clay	(Brazil) Gustavo Heide	(Ecuador) Diego Hidalgo (Colombia) Cristian Rodríguez	6–4, 7–5
Loss	3–1	Jun 2024	Lima Challenger, Peru	Challenger	Clay	(Brazil) Pedro Sakamoto	(Lebanon) Hady Habib (United States) Trey Hilderbrand	5–7, 3–6
Win	4–1	May 2025	Santos Brasil Tennis Cup, Brazil	Challenger	Clay	(Argentina) Gonzalo Villanueva	(Bolivia) Boris Arias (Bolivia) Federico Zeballos	6–2, 6–7^{(3–7)}, [10–7]
Loss	4–2	Sep 2025	Buenos Aires Challenger, Argentina	Challenger	Clay	(Brazil) João Lucas Reis da Silva	(Argentina) Guillermo Durán (Argentina) Mariano Kestelboim	6–7^{(3–7)}, 1–6

== ITF World Tennis Tour finals ==
=== Singles: 7 (4 titles, 3 runner-ups) ===
Legend ITF WTT (4–3)	Finals by surface Hard (–) Clay (4–3)

Result	W–L	Date	Tournament	Tier	Surface	Opponent	Score
Win	1–0	Oct 2021	M25 Rio do Sul, Brazil	WTT	Clay	(Brazil) Gustavo Heide	7–6^{(7–4)}, 6–4
Win	2–0	Feb 2022	M15 Naples, US	WTT	Clay	(Bolivia) Murkel Dellien	6–3, 7–6^{(7–5)}
Loss	2–1	Jun 2023	M25 Kiseljak, Bosnia and Herzegovina	WTT	Clay	(Croatia) Duje Ajduković	2–6, 5–7
Win	3–1	Sep 2024	M15 Asunción, Paraguay	WTT	Clay	(Argentina) Lautaro Midón	6–2, 7–6^{(7–4)}
Win	4–1	May 2025	M25 Coquimbo, Chile	WTT	Clay	(Argentina) Gonzalo Villanueva	6–3, 6–1
Loss	4–2	Jul 2025	M25 Metzingen, Germany	WTT	Clay	(Belgium) Jack Logé	6–7^{(4–7)}, 7–6^{(8–6)}, 4–6
Loss	4–3	Nov 2025	M25 Santa Cruz do Sul, Brazil	WTT	Clay	(Brazil) Matheus Pucinelli de Almeida	6–7^{(2–7)}, 2–6

=== Doubles: 8 (4 titles, 4 runner-ups) ===
Legend ITF WTT (4–4)	Finals by surface Hard (–) Clay (4–4)

Result	W–L	Date	Tournament	Tier	Surface	Partner	Opponents	Score
Loss	0–1	Jun 2021	M15 Bergamo, Italy	WTT	Clay	(United States) Dali Blanch	(Argentina) Juan Ignacio Galarza (Argentina) Román Andrés Burruchaga	4–6, 3–6
Loss	0–2	Sep 2021	M25 Medellín, Colombia	WTT	Clay	(Brazil) Gustavo Heide	(Brazil) Gilbert Klier Jr. (Brazil) João Lucas Reis da Silva	4–6, 6–4, [8–10]
Win	1–2	Sep 2021	M15 Recife, Brazil	WTT	Clay	(Brazil) Gustavo Heide	(Brazil) Daniel Dutra da Silva (Brazil) Marcelo Zormann	7–6^{(7–1)}, 3–6, [10–8]
Loss	1–3	Oct 2021	M25 Rio do Sul, Brazil	WTT	Clay	(Brazil) Gustavo Heide	(Brazil) Daniel Dutra da Silva (Brazil) Igor Marcondes	4–6, 3–6
Win	2–3	Feb 2022	M15 Naples, US	WTT	Clay	(Brazil) José Pereira	(United States) Colin Markes (New Zealand) Kiranpal Pannu	0–6, 6–2, [14–12]
Loss	2–4	Mar 2022	M25 Anapoima, Colombia	WTT	Clay	(Argentina) Valerio Aboian	(Peru) Arklon Huertas del Pino (Peru) Conner Huertas del Pino	3–6, 3–6
Win	3–4	Jul 2025	M25 Metzingen, Germany	WTT	Clay	(Brazil) Daniel Dutra da Silva	(Germany) Adrian Oetzbach (Czech Republic) Daniel Siniakov	walkover
Win	4–4	Sep 2025	M25 Cuiabá, Brazil	WTT	Clay	(Brazil) Igor Marcondes	(Brazil) Victor Hugo Remondy Pagotto (Brazil) João Vítor Scramin do Lago	6–2, 6–3
