= Alejo Lorenzo Lingua Lavallén =

Argentine tennis player (born 2001)

- Country (sports): Argentina
- Born: 9 March 2001 (age 24) Marcos Juárez, Argentina
- Height: 1.75 m (5 ft 9 in)
- Plays: Left-handed (two-handed backhand)
- Prize money: $81,248

Singles
- Career record: 0–0
- Career titles: 1 Challenger, 4 ITF
- Highest ranking: No. 377 (19 August 2024)
- Current ranking: No. 982 (19 January 2026)

Doubles
- Career record: 0–0
- Career titles: 8 ITF
- Highest ranking: No. 468 (25 July 2022)
- Current ranking: No. 1,041 (19 January 2026)
- Last updated on: 21 January 2026.

Alejo Lorenzo Lingua Lavallén (born 9 March 2001) is an Argentine tennis player.

Lingua Lavallén has a career high ATP singles ranking of No. 377 achieved on 19 August 2024. He also has a career high doubles ranking of No. 468 achieved on 25 July 2022.

Lingua Lavallén has won one ATP Challenger singles title at the 2024 Santos Brasil Tennis Cup.

== ATP Challenger Tour finals ==
=== Singles: 1 (1 title) ===
Legend ATP Challenger Tour (1–0)

Result	W–L	Date	Tournament	Tier	Surface	Opponent	Score
Win	1–0	May 2024	Santos Brasil Tennis Cup, Brazil	Challenger	Clay	(Lebanon) Hady Habib	4–6, 6–4, 6–3

== ITF World Tennis Tour finals ==
=== Singles: 6 (4 titles, 2 runner-ups) ===
Legend ITF WTT (4–2)	Finals by surface Hard (0–1) Clay (4–1) Grass (0–0) Carpet (0–0)

Result	W–L	Date	Tournament	Tier	Surface	Opponent	Score
Loss	0–1	Jan 2020	M15 Cancún, Mexico	WTT	Hard	(Argentina) Manuel Pena Lopez	3–6, 0–6
Loss	0–2	Jul 2021	M15 Cairo, Egypt	WTT	Clay	(Argentina) Juan Bautista Torres	6–1, 1–6, 5–7
Win	1–2	Sep 2021	M15 Ulcinj, Montenegro	WTT	Clay	(United Kingdom) Felix Gill	6–3, 6–2
Win	2–2	Mar 2022	M25 Anapoima, Colombia	WTT	Clay	(Ukraine) Oleg Prihodko	6–3, 6–0
Win	3–2	Apr 2024	M15 Bragado, Argentina	WTT	Clay	(Argentina) Bautista Vilicich	6–2, 6–1
Win	4–2	May 2024	M15 Neuquén, Argentina	WTT	Clay	(Argentina) Mariano Kestelboim	6–3, 7–6^{(7–2)}
