= Guto Miguel =

Brazilian tennis player (born 2009)

Luís Augusto Miguel
- Full name: Luís Augusto Queiroz Miguel
- Country (sports): Brazil
- Residence: Goiânia, Brazil
- Born: 26 February 2009 (age 17) Goianésia, Goiás, Brazil
- Height: 1.80 m (5 ft 11 in)
- Plays: Right-handed (two-handed backhand)
- Coach: Santos Dumont Guimaraes Jr, Pedro de Paula
- Prize money: US $82,844

Singles
- Career record: 0–1 (at ATP Tour level, Grand Slam level, and in Davis Cup)
- Career titles: 0
- Highest ranking: No. 541 (19 October 2026)
- Current ranking: No. 541 (19 October 2026)

Grand Slam singles results
- Australian Open Junior: QF (2026)
- French Open Junior: W (2026)
- Wimbledon Junior: 2R (2025, 2026)
- US Open Junior: F (2026)

Doubles
- Career record: 1–1 (at ATP Tour level, Grand Slam level, and in Davis Cup)
- Career titles: 0
- Highest ranking: No. 160 (19 October 2026)
- Current ranking: No. 160 (19 October 2026)

Grand Slam doubles results
- Australian Open Junior: QF (2025, 2026)
- French Open Junior: QF (2026)
- Wimbledon Junior: W (2026)
- US Open Junior: QF (2026)
- Last updated on: 19 October 2026.

Luís Augusto "Guto" Queiroz Miguel (born 26 February 2009) is a Brazilian tennis player. He has a career-high ATP doubles ranking of world No. 169 and a singles ranking of No. 541, both achieved on 19 October 2026.

Miguel has won three ATP Challenger titles in doubles.

== Early life ==
Miguel was born and raised in Goiânia, Brazil. He began playing tennis at the age of four, following in the footsteps of his older brother, Luís Felipe Miguel, who is also a competitive tennis player. The brothers frequently compete together in doubles on the professional tour.

Miguel is coached by Santos Dumont and Pedro de Paula at the Fly Sports Academy in Goiânia. Due to his rapid rise in the junior rankings, he also spends significant time training in Europe, primarily at the Mouratoglou Tennis Academy in France.

== Junior career ==
In July 2023, Miguel reached the semifinals in the boys' U14 event at Wimbledon, where he lost to home favourite and eventual champion Mark Ceban.

In May 2025, he won the Astrid Bowl, a top junior-level event hosted in Charleroi-Marcinelle, Belgium. A few months later, Miguel won a J300-level event in Repentigny, Canada. At the 2025 US Open, he reached the semifinals in singles, where he lost to fifth seed and eventual runner-up Alexander Vasilev. Later that season, he won the Yucatán Cup in Mérida, Mexico, becoming the first Brazilian player to lift a J500 trophy since Orlando Luz in 2015.

In January 2026, Miguel won the J300 Traralgon International in Australia in both singles and doubles, becoming the first South American champion of the event. He followed this by reaching the quarterfinals of the Australian Open Boys' singles, where he lost to seventh seed and eventual champion Žiga Šeško.

Miguel had significant results on the ITF junior circuit, holding a singles win-loss record of 92–30 as of May 2026. He reached an ITF junior combined ranking of world No. 1 on 8 June 2026.

== Professional career ==
=== 2025: Maiden Challenger title in doubles ===
In July 2025, Miguel won his first professional title at the M25 São Paulo, a Futures-level event, alongside his brother Luís Felipe Miguel. The pair won a second title a few weeks later at the M15 Joinville.

In October 2025, at the age of 16, Miguel lifted his first ATP Challenger title in doubles at the 2025 Costa do Sauípe Open. Partnering with compatriot Eduardo Ribeiro, the pair defeated second seeds Gonzalo Escobar and Miguel Ángel Reyes-Varela in the final.

=== 2026: ATP debut ===
Miguel received a wildcard to the main draw at the 2026 Rio Open, after Gaël Monfils's withdraw due to an injury, making his debut ATP Tour debut. He lost in the first round to qualifier Vilius Gaubas in three sets. He also received an invitation to play doubles in the qualifying with compatriot Gustavo Heide. They entered in the main draw as lucky losers and won against fourth seeds Evan King and John Peers to reach the quarterfinals, where they lost to German pair Jakob Schnaitter and Mark Wallner.

== ATP Challenger Tour finals ==
=== Doubles: 5 (3 titles, 2 runner-up) ===
| Legend ATP Challenger (3–2) | Finals by surface Clay (3–2) |

| Result | W–L | Date | Tournament | Surface | Partner | Opponents | Score |
|---|---|---|---|---|---|---|---|
| Win | 1–0 | Oct 2025 | Costa do Sauípe Open, Brazil | Clay | (Brazil) Eduardo Ribeiro | (Ecuador) Gonzalo Escobar (Mexico) Miguel Ángel Reyes-Varela | 7–6^{(7–4)}, 4–6, [10–5] |
| Win | 2–0 | Mar 2026 | LA Open, Brazil | Clay | (Brazil) Gustavo Heide | (Brazil) Felipe Meligeni Alves (Brazil) João Lucas Reis da Silva | 6–4, 6–2 |
| Win | 3–0 | May 2026 | Santos Brasil Tennis Cup, Brazil | Clay | (Brazil) Luís Felipe Miguel | (Brazil) Mateus Alves (Brazil) Pedro Sakamoto | 6–3, 6–4 |
| Loss | 3–1 | Sep 2026 | Curitiba Challenger, Brazil | Clay | (Brazil) Eduardo Ribeiro | (Brazil) Marcelo Zormann (Argentina) Mariano Kestelboim | 7–5, 6–7^{(3–7)}, [7–10] |
| Loss | 3–2 | Oct 2026 | Santa Cruz Challenger, Bolivia | Clay | (Brazil) Eduardo Ribeiro | (Ecuador) Diego Hidalgo (Argentina) Mariano Kestelboim | 6–1, 4–6, [8–10] |

== ITF World Tennis Tour finals ==
=== Doubles: 3 (2 titles, 1 runner-up) ===
| Legend ITF World Tennis (2–1) | Finals by surface Clay (2–1) |

| Result | W–L | Date | Tournament | Surface | Partner | Opponents | Score |
|---|---|---|---|---|---|---|---|
| Loss | 0–1 | Jul 2024 | M25 São Paulo, Brazil | Clay | (Brazil) Nicolas Oliveira | (Brazil) Igor Gimenez (Brazil) Mateo Barreiros Reyes | 1–6, 0–6 |
| Win | 1–1 | Jul 2025 | M25 São Paulo, Brazil | Clay | (Brazil) Luís Felipe Miguel | (Argentina) Tadeo Meneo (Argentina) Bautista Vilicich | 6–1, 6–2 |
| Win | 2–1 | Jul 2025 | M15 Joinville, Brazil | Clay (i) | (Brazil) Luís Felipe Miguel | (Brazil) Natan Rodrigues (Brazil) Ryan Augusto dos Santos | 6–2, 6–4 |

== Exhibition matches ==
=== Singles ===
| Result | Date | Tournament | Surface | Opponent | Score |
|---|---|---|---|---|---|
| Loss | Jul 2026 | Ultimate Tennis Showdown, Rio de Janeiro, Brazil | Hard (i) | (United States) Brandon Nakashima | 14–15, 14–17, 13–15 |

== Junior Grand Slam finals ==
=== Singles: 2 (1 title, 1 runner-up) ===
| Result | Year | Tournament | Surface | Opponent | Score |
|---|---|---|---|---|---|
| Win | 2026 | French Open | Clay | (United States) Michael Antonius | 6–3, 6–4 |
| Loss | 2026 | US Open | Hard | (United States) Marcel Latak | 6–3, 5–7, 6–7^{(13–15)} |

=== Doubles: 1 (title) ===
| Result | Year | Tournament | Surface | Partner | Opponents | Score |
|---|---|---|---|---|---|---|
| Win | 2026 | Wimbledon | Grass | (Slovenia) Žiga Šeško | (United States) Michael Antonius (United States) Andrew Johnson | 6–1, 6–4 |
