= Luís Felipe Miguel =

Brazilian tennis player (born 2004)

- Country (sports): Brazil
- Born: 10 March 2004 (age 22) Goiânia, Brazil
- Plays: Right-handed (two-handed backhand)
- College: Liberty; Tulsa; Florida State
- Coach: Santos dumont e Kike Granjeiro
- Prize money: US $11,346

Singles
- Career record: 0–0 (at ATP Tour level, Grand Slam level, and in Davis Cup)
- Career titles: 0
- Highest ranking: No. 901 (29 June 2026)
- Current ranking: No. 1,011 (19 October 2026)

Doubles
- Career record: 0–0 (at ATP Tour level, Grand Slam level, and in Davis Cup)
- Career titles: 1 Challenger, 2 ITF
- Highest ranking: No. 414 (13 July 2026)
- Current ranking: No. 489 (19 October 2026)
- Last updated on: 19 October 2026.

Luís Felipe Miguel (born 10 March 2004) is a Brazilian tennis player. Miguel has a career high ATP singles ranking of No. 901 achieved on 29 June 2026 and a career high ATP doubles ranking of No. 414 achieved on 13 July 2026.

Miguel has won one ATP Challenger doubles title at the 2026 Santos Brasil Tennis Cup.

Miguel played college tennis at Tulsa before transferring to Florida State. He is the older brother of tennis player Guto Miguel.
