= Pedro Sakamoto =

Brazilian tennis player

- Full name: Pedro Henrique Morio Sakamoto
- Country (sports): Brazil
- Residence: Rio de Janeiro, Brazil
- Born: 29 June 1993 (age 33) Guarulhos, Brazil
- Height: 1.78 m (5 ft 10 in)
- Turned pro: 2009
- Plays: Right-handed (two-handed backhand)
- Coach: Arthur Andrade
- Prize money: US $299,417

Singles
- Career record: 0–1
- Career titles: 0
- Highest ranking: No. 271 (9 September 2024)
- Current ranking: No. 518 (19 October 2026)

Doubles
- Career record: 0–0
- Career titles: 0; 1 Challenger
- Highest ranking: No. 272 (3 February 2020)
- Current ranking: No. 459 (19 October 2026)
- Last updated on: 19 October 2026.

Pedro Henrique Morio Sakamoto (born 29 June 1993) is a Brazilian professional tennis player. He has a career-high ATP singles ranking of No. 271 achieved on 9 September 2024 and a doubles ranking of No. 272 achieved on 3 February 2020.

Sakamoto has won one ATP Challenger Tour doubles title, with countryman João Fonseca.

He made his ATP main draw debut at the 2019 Brasil Open, where he qualified for the main draw defeating Matteo Donati and Carlos Berlocq.

== ATP Challenger Tour finals ==
=== Singles: 1 (runner-up) ===
Legend ATP Challenger Tour (0–1)

Result	W–L	Date	Tournament	Tier	Surface	Opponent	Score
Loss	0–1	May 2025	Open Bogotá, Colombia	Challenger	Clay	(United States) Patrick Kypson	1–6, 3–6

=== Doubles: 6 (1 title, 5 runner-ups) ===
Legend ATP Challenger Tour (1–5)	Finals by surface Hard (0–0) Clay (1–5)

Result	W–L	Date	Tournament	Tier	Surface	Partner	Opponents	Score
Loss	0–1	Apr 2023	Florianópolis Challenger, Brazil	Challenger	Clay	(Brazil) Christian Oliveira	(Brazil) Gustavo Heide (Brazil) Pedro Boscardin Dias	2–6, 5–7
Win	1–1	Jan 2024	Challenger ATT II, Argentina	Challenger	Clay	(Brazil) João Fonseca	(Germany) Jakob Schnaitter (Germany) Mark Wallner	6–2, 6–2
Loss	1–2	Jan 2024	Brasil Tennis Challenger, Brazil	Challenger	Clay	(Brazil) Daniel Dutra da Silva	(Argentina) Guido Andreozzi (Argentina) Guillermo Durán	2–6, 6–7^{(5–7)}
Loss	1–3	Jun 2024	Lima Challenger, Peru	Challenger	Clay	(Brazil) Pedro Boscardin Dias	(Lebanon) Hady Habib (United States) Trey Hilderbrand	5–7, 3–6
Loss	1–4	May 2026	Santos Brasil Tennis Cup, Brasil	Challenger	Clay	(Brazil) Mateus Alves	(Brazil) Guto Miguel (Brazil) Luís Felipe Miguel	3–6, 4–6
Loss	1–5	Jun 2026	Quito Challenger, Ecuador	Challenger	Clay	(Argentina) Hernán Casanova	(Chile) Matías Soto (Bolivia) Federico Zeballos]	1–6, 4–6

== ITF Tour finals ==
=== Singles: 19 (7 titles, 12 runner-ups) ===
Legend ITF Futures/WTT (7–12)	Finals by surface Hard (1–0) Clay (6–12)

Result	W–L	Date	Tournament	Tier	Surface	Opponent	Score
Win	1–0	Aug 2013	Brazil F4, Manaus	Futures	Clay	(Brazil) Fernando Romboli	7–6^{(7–4)}, 7–5
Loss	1–1	Sep 2013	Brazil F8, Caxias do Sul	Futures	Clay	(Brazil) Fabrício Neis	2–6, 2–6
Loss	1–2	May 2015	Georgia F2, Pantiani	Futures	Clay	(Poland) Grzegorz Panfil	6–7^{(5–7)}, 5–7
Loss	1–3	Jan 2016	US F5, Weston	Futures	Clay	(Canada) Denis Shapovalov	6–7^{(2–7)}, 3–6
Loss	1–4	Mar 2016	Argentina F3, Rosario	Futures	Clay	(Argentina) Tomás Lipovšek Puches	4–6, 6–2, 1–6
Loss	1–5	Mar 2017	Turkey F10, Antalya	Futures	Clay	(Czech Republic) Václav Šafránek	3–6, 3–6
Win	2–5	Jun 2017	Romania F4, Bucharest	Futures	Clay	(Netherlands) Michiel de Krom	6–1, 6–3
Loss	2–6	Aug 2018	Poland F7, Bydgoszcz	Futures	Clay	(Germany) Jeremy Jahn	3–6, 4–6
Loss	2–7	Jan 2019	M15 Naples, US	WTT	Clay	(United States) Sekou Bangoura	6–7^{(6–8)}, 0–6
Win	3–7	Apr 2019	M15 Pinamar, Argentina	WTT	Clay	(Argentina) Manuel Peña López	6–3, 6–3
Win	4–7	Jun 2019	M25 Huelva, Spain	WTT	Clay	(Chile) Bastián Malla	6–2, 2–6, 7–6^{(7–2)}
Loss	4–8	Nov 2019	M25 Orlando, US	WTT	Clay	(Peru) Nicolás Álvarez	6–3, 2–6, 1–6
Win	5–8	Oct 2023	M25 Lajeado, Brazil	WTT	Clay	(Brazil) Wilson Leite	6–1, 6–1
Finalist	NP	Feb 2024	M25 San Miguel de Tucumán, Argentina	WTT	Clay	(Kazakhstan) Dmitry Popko	cancelled
Win	6–8	Jul 2024	M15 Belém, Brazil	WTT	Hard	(United States) Alexander Stater	6–4, 6–1
Win	7–8	Jul 2024	M25 São Paulo, Brazil	WTT	Clay	(Argentina) Tomás Farjat	7–6^{(7–4)}, 7–6^{(8–6)}
Loss	7–9	Feb 2025	M25 Yerba Buena, Argentina	WTT	Clay	(Argentina) Lautaro Midón	4–6, 5–7
Loss	7–10	Sep 2026	M15 Leme, Brazil	WTT	Clay	(Brazil) Mateus Alves	3–6, 2–6
Loss	7–11	Sep 2026	M15 Curitiba, Brazil	WTT	Clay	(Brazil) Mateus Alves	4–6, 2–6
Loss	7–12	Oct 2026	M15 Maringa, Brazil	WTT	Clay	(Brazil) Joao Eduardo Schiessl	3–6, 4–6
