= Roy Stepanov =

Israeli tennis player (born 1999)

- Native name: רועי סטפנוב
- Country (sports): Israel; Canada
- Born: 2 June 1999 (age 26) Afula, Israel
- Height: 1.83 m (6 ft 0 in)
- Plays: Right-handed (two-handed backhand)
- Prize money: $30,677

Singles
- Career record: 0–0
- Career titles: 0

Doubles
- Career record: 0–0
- Career titles: 1 Challenger, 3 ITF
- Highest ranking: No. 274 (4 August 2025)
- Current ranking: No. 292 (16 February 2026)
- Last updated on: 16 February 2026.

Roy Stepanov (Hebrew: רועי סטפנוב; born 2 June 1999) is an Israeli tennis player.

Stepanov has a career high ATP doubles ranking of No. 274 achieved on 4 August 2025.

Stepanov has won 1 ATP Challenger doubles title at the 2024 Santos Brasil Tennis Cup with Andrés Urrea.
