= Franco Roncadelli =

Uruguayan tennis player (born 2000)

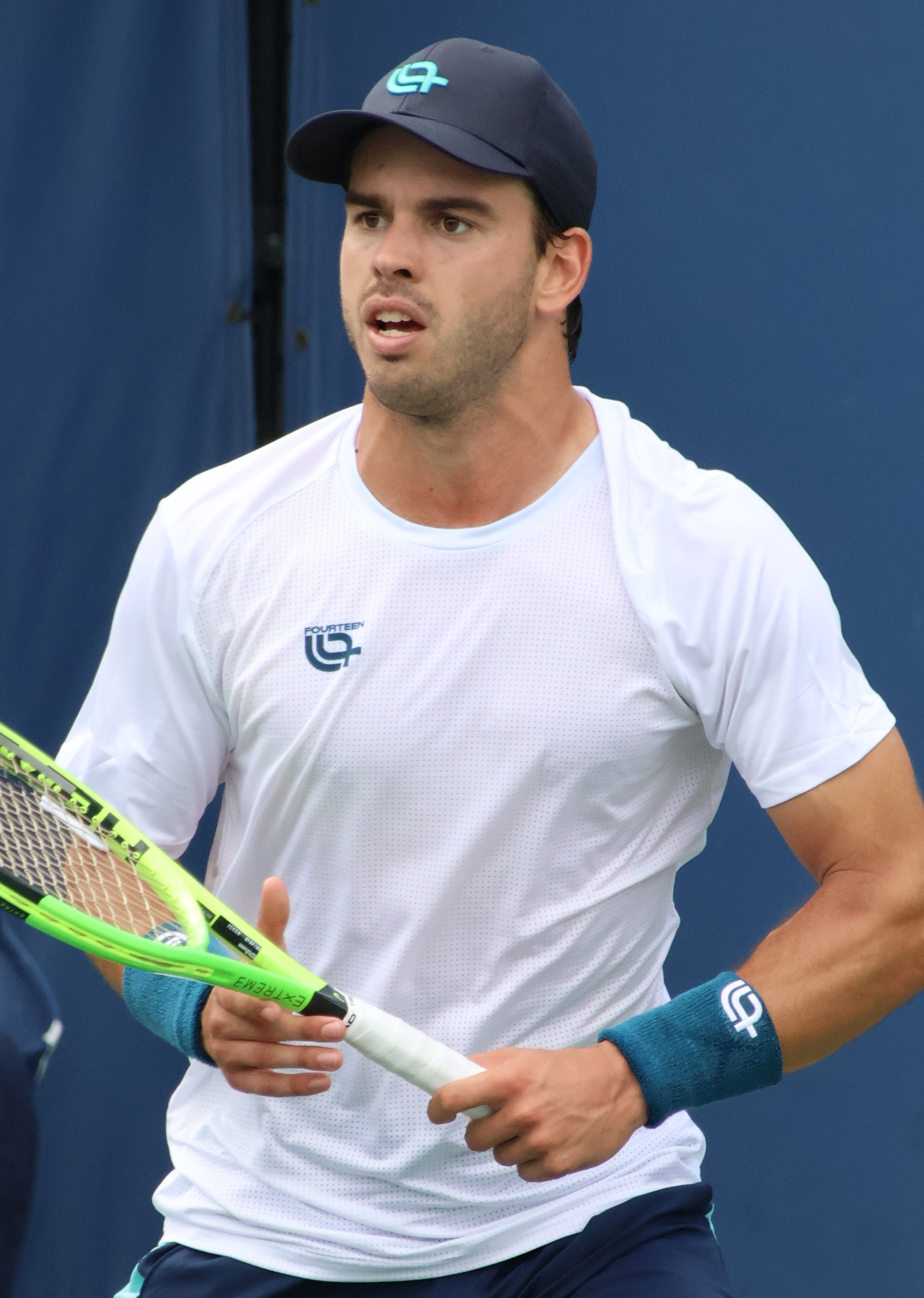
- Roncadelli at the 2026 US Open
- Country (sports): Uruguay
- Residence: Montevideo, Uruguay
- Born: 6 February 2000 (age 26) Montevideo, Uruguay
- Height: 1.85 m (6 ft 1 in)
- Turned pro: 2018
- Plays: Left-handed (two-handed backhand)
- Coach: Martin Rondina
- Prize money: US $248,697

Singles
- Career record: 6–6 (at ATP Tour level, Grand Slam level, and in Davis Cup)
- Career titles: 0
- Highest ranking: No. 222 (16 November 2026)
- Current ranking: No. 222 (16 November 2026)

Grand Slam singles results
- Wimbledon: Q1 (2026)
- US Open: Q1 (2026)

Doubles
- Career record: 1–0 (at ATP Tour level, Grand Slam level, and in Davis Cup)
- Career titles: 0
- Highest ranking: No. 236 (3 November 2025)
- Current ranking: No. 401 (16 November 2026)
- Last updated on: 16 November 2026.

Franco Roncadelli (born 6 February 2000) is a Uruguayan tennis player. He has a career high ATP singles ranking of world No. 222 achieved on 16 November 2026 and a career high doubles ranking of No. 236 achieved on 3 November 2025. He is currently the No. 1 Uruguayan player.

== Career ==
Roncadelli made his ATP main draw debut at the 2020 ATP Cup, losing a singles match to Roberto Bautista Agut.

== ATP Challenger and ITF Tour finals ==
=== Singles: 14 (5–9) ===
Legend ATP Challenger (1–4) ITF World Tennis Tour (4–5)	Finals by surface Hard (0–0) Clay (5–9)

Result	W–L	Date	Tournament	Tier	Surface	Opponent	Score
Loss	0–1	Nov 2022	M15 Santa Cruz de la Sierra, Bolivia	World Tour	Clay	(Bolivia) Murkel Dellien	6–7^{(5–7)}, 3–6
Loss	0–2	Apr 2023	M15 Mogi das Cruzes, Brazil	World Tour	Clay	(Brazil) Orlando Luz	6–2, 0–6, 2–6
Loss	0–3	Jul 2023	M15 Casablanca, Morocco	World Tour	Clay	(Spain) Mario González Fernández	3–6, 3–6
Win	1–3	Jun 2024	M15 Nyíregyháza, Hungary	World Tour	Clay	(Czech Republic) Dominik Kellovský	6–2, 1–6, 7–5
Win	2–3	Jun 2024	M15 Nyíregyháza, Hungary	World Tour	Clay	(Romania) Dan Alexandru Tomescu	7–6^{(7–3)}, 6–1
Win	3–3	Jul 2024	M25 Bucharest, Romania	World Tour	Clay	(Romania) Dan Alexandru Tomescu	2–6, 7–6^{(8–6)}, 6–3
Win	4–3	Aug 2024	M25 Pitesti, Romania	World Tour	Clay	(Spain) Alex Marti Pujolras	5–7, 6–1, 6–2
Loss	4–4	Jun 2025	Santa Cruz de la Sierra, Bolivia	Challenger	Clay	(Argentina) Alex Barrena	7–5, 5–7, 3–6
Loss	4–5	Jul 2025	M25+H Bacău, Romania	World Tour	Clay	(Italy) Carlo Alberto Caniato	3–6, 2–6
Loss	4–6	Jul 2025	M25 Pitești, Romania	World Tour	Clay	(Romania) Adrian Boitan	6–7^{(1–7)}, 3–6
Loss	4–7	Mar 2026	Asunción, Paraguay	Challenger	Clay	(Italy) Gianluca Cadenasso	6–7^{(5–7)}, 0–6
Win	5–7	May 2026	Santos, Brazil	Challenger	Clay	(Argentina) Hernán Casanova	6–3, 6–2
Loss	5–8	May 2026	Córdoba, Argentina	Challenger	Clay	(Argentina) Juan Manuel La Serna	5–7, 6–2, 3–6
Loss	5–9	Nov 2026	Lima, Peru	Challenger	Clay	(Spain) Nikolás Sánchez Izquierdo	6–7^{(4–7)}, 5–7

=== Doubles: 16 (9–7) ===
Legend (doubles) ATP Challenger Tour (0–3) ITF World Tennis Tour (9–4)	Titles by surface Hard (0–1) Clay (9–6)

Result	W–L	Date	Tournament	Tier	Surface	Partner	Opponents	Score
Win	1–0	Oct 2022	M15 Santa Cruz de la Sierra, Bolivia	World Tennis Tour	Clay	(Argentina) Lorenzo Gagliardo	(Argentina) Lautaro Agustín Falabella (Chile) Nicolás Bruna	7–5, 6–4
Loss	1–1	Nov 2022	M15 Luján, Argentina	World Tennis Tour	Clay	(Argentina) Lorenzo Gagliardo	(Argentina) Tomás Lipovšek Puches (Argentina) Juan Ignacio Galarza	4–6, 7–5, [11-13]
Loss	1–2	Feb 2023	M15 Monastir, Tunisia	World Tennis Tour	Hard	(Italy) Fabrizio Andaloro	(Greece) Stefanos Sakellaridis (South Africa) Kris van Wyk	(W/O)
Win	2–2	Jun 2023	M15 Casablanca, Morocco	World Tennis Tour	Clay	(Chile) Nicola Bruna	(France) Sven Corbinais (Chile) Diego Fernandez Flores	(W/O)
Loss	2–3	Jul 2023	M25 Padova, Italy	World Tennis Tour	Clay	(Chile) Nicola Bruna	(Argentina) Lautaro Midón (Brazil) Fernando Yamacita	3–6, 7–6^{(7–4)}, [6–10]
Win	3–3	Sep 2023	M25 Olavarria, Argentina	World Tennis Tour	Clay	(Italy) Lorenzo Gagliardo	(Uruguay) Ignacio Carou (Argentina) Mariano Kestelboim	6–7^{(5–7)}, 7–6^{(9–7)}, [10–6]
Win	4–3	Nov 2023	M15 Santa Cruz, Bolivia	World Tennis Tour	Clay	(Argentina) Tomas Farjat	(United States) Pranav Kumar (United States) Noah Schachter	3–6, 6–3, [10–8]
Win	5–3	Feb 2024	M25 Punta del Este, Uruguay	World Tennis Tour	Clay	(Brazil) Paulo André Saraiva dos Santos	(Chile) Nicolas Bruna (Argentina) Juan Bautista Otegui	4–6, 6–3, [10–5]
Loss	5–4	Apr 2024	Florianópolis, Brazil	Challenger	Clay	(Argentina) Lorenzo Joaquín Rodríguez	(Israel) Daniel Cukierman (Spain) Carlos Sánchez Jover	0–6, 6–3, [4–10]
Loss	5–5	Apr 2024	M15 Quillota, Chile	World Tennis Tour	Clay	(Brazil) Paulo Andre Saraiva dos Santos	(Argentina) Juan Bautista Otegui (Venezuela) Brandon Perez	2–6, 4–6
Win	6–5	Jun 2024	M25 Grasse, France	World Tennis Tour	Clay	(Argentina) Mariano Kestelboim	(France) Corentin Denolly (Switzerland) Damien Wenger	6–3, 7–5
Win	7–5	Jul 2024	M25 Bacau, Romania	World Tennis Tour	Clay	(Brazil) Paulo Andre Saraiva dos Santos	(Romania) Bogdan Pavel (Moldova) Ilya Snitari	6–4, 6–4
Loss	7–6	Nov 2024	Montevideo, Uruguay	Challenger	Clay	(Argentina) Mariano Kestelboim	(Argentina) Guido Andreozzi (Brazil) Orlando Luz	6–4, 3–6, [8–10]
Loss	7–7	Jan 2025	Tigre, Argentina	Challenger	Clay	(Brazil) Luís Britto	(Argentina) Mariano Kestelboim (Argentina) Gonzalo Villanueva	2–6, 5–7
Win	8–7	Jul 2025	M25+H Bacau, Romania	World Tennis Tour	Clay	(Moldova) Ilya Snițari	(Ukraine) Oleksandr Ovcharenko (Argentina) Juan Pablo Paz	5–7, 6–4, [10–5]
Win	9–7	Jul 2025	M25 Pitești, Romania	World Tennis Tour	Clay	(Moldova) Ilya Snițari	(Italy) Gianluca Cadenasso (Italy) Niccolò Catini	6–4, 6–4
