= Álvaro Guillén Meza =

Ecuadorian tennis player (born 2003)

- Álvaro Guillén Meza representing Ecuador in the 2026 Davis Cup in a tie against Great Britain.
- Country (sports): Ecuador
- Born: 2 January 2003 (age 23) Guayaquil, Ecuador
- Height: 1.75 m (5 ft 9 in)
- Plays: Right-handed (two-handed backhand)
- Prize money: US $270,505

Singles
- Career record: 3–4 (at ATP Tour level, Grand Slam level, and in Davis Cup)
- Career titles: 0
- Highest ranking: No. 175 (9 June 2025)
- Current ranking: No. 226 (6 April 2026)

Grand Slam singles results
- Australian Open: Q1 (2026)
- French Open: Q2 (2025)
- Wimbledon: Q1 (2025)
- US Open: Q1 (2024)

Doubles
- Career record: 0–0 (at ATP Tour level, Grand Slam level, and in Davis Cup)
- Career titles: 0
- Highest ranking: No. 400 (22 July 2024)
- Current ranking: No. 497 (12 January 2026)
- Last updated on: 6 April 2026.

Álvaro Guillén Meza (born 2 January 2003) is an Ecuadorian professional tennis player. He has a career-high ATP singles ranking of No. 175 achieved on 9 June 2025 and a doubles ranking of No. 400 reached on 22 July 2024. He is currently the No. 2 singles player from Ecuador.

Guillén Meza plays mostly on the ATP Challenger Tour. He represents Ecuador at the Davis Cup, where he has a W/L record of 1–1.

== Professional career ==
=== 2023: Maiden Challenger title ===
At 20 years old, Guillén Meza won his maiden Challenger title at the 2023 Lima Challenger. He became the youngest Ecuadorian champion since Giovanni Lapentti in 2003.

=== 2024: Second Challenger title ===
Guillén Meza won his second Challenger title at the 2024 Ibagué Open, defeating Facundo Mena in the final.

=== 2025: ATP Tour debut ===
In May, Guillén Meza claimed his third Challenger title at the 2025 Santos Brasil Tennis Cup, overcoming Matheus Pucinelli de Almeida in the final. As a result, he reached the top 200 at world No. 180 on 19 May 2025.

In July, Guillén Meza made his ATP Tour debut as a qualifier at the Croatia Open. He lost to Stan Wawrinka in the first round.

== Performance timeline ==
=== Singles ===
Tournament	2024	2025	2026	SR	W–L	Win%
Grand Slam tournaments
Australian Open	A	A	Q1	0 / 0	0–0	–
French Open	A	Q2		0 / 0	0–0	–
Wimbledon	A	Q1		0 / 0	0–0	–
US Open	Q1	A		0 / 0	0–0	–
Win–loss	0–0	0–0	0–0	0 / 0	0–0	–
ATP Masters 1000
Indian Wells Masters	A	A		0 / 0	0–0	–
Miami Open	A	A		0 / 0	0–0	–
Monte Carlo Masters	A	A		0 / 0	0–0	–
Madrid Open	A	A		0 / 0	0-0	–
Italian Open	A	A		0 / 0	0–0	–
Canadian Open	A	A		0 / 0	0–0	–
Cincinnati Masters	A	A		0 / 0	0–0	–
Shanghai Masters	A	A		0 / 0	0–0	–
Paris Masters	A	A		0 / 0	0–0	–
Win–loss	0–0	0–0	0–0	0 / 0	0–0	–

== ATP Challenger Tour finals ==
=== Singles: 5 (3 titles, 2 runner-ups) ===
Legend ATP Challenger Tour (3–2)	Finals by surface Hard (0–0) Clay (3–2)

Result	W–L	Date	Tournament	Tier	Surface	Opponent	Score
Win	1–0	Aug 2023	Lima Challenger, Peru	Challenger	Clay	(Jamaica) Blaise Bicknell	7–6^{(7–3)}, 6–1
Loss	1–1	Jun 2024	Santa Cruz Challenger, Bolivia	Challenger	Clay	(Argentina) Juan Manuel Cerúndolo	6–3, 1–6, 4–6
Win	2–1	Jun 2024	Ibagué Open, Colombia	Challenger	Clay	(Argentina) Facundo Mena	6–0, 6–4
Loss	2–2	Mar 2025	Campeonato Internacional de Tênis, Brazil	Challenger	Clay	(Chile) Tomás Barrios Vera	4–6, 3–6
Win	3–2	May 2025	Santos Brasil Tennis Cup, Brazil	Challenger	Clay	(Brazil) Matheus Pucinelli de Almeida	6–3, 7–6^{(14–12)}

=== Doubles: 2 (2 runner-ups) ===
Legend ATP Challenger Tour (0–2)

Result	W–L	Date	Tournament	Tier	Surface	Partner	Opponents	Score
Loss	0–1	Jul 2023	Salinas Challenger, Ecuador	Challenger	Hard	(Ecuador) Ángel Díaz Jalil	(United States) Vasil Kirkov (United States) Alfredo Perez	5–7, 5–7
Loss	0–2	Mar 2024	Paraguay Open, Paraguay	Challenger	Clay	(Peru) Gonzalo Bueno	(Bolivia) Boris Arias (Bolivia) Federico Zeballos	2–6, 2–6

== ITF World Tennis Tour finals ==
=== Singles: 7 (4 titles, 3 runner-ups) ===
Legend ITF WTT (4–3)	Finals by surface Hard (0–0) Clay (4–3)

Result	W–L	Date	Tournament	Tier	Surface	Opponent	Score
Loss	0–1	Jun 2023	M15 Litija, Slovenia	WTT	Clay	(Poland) Paweł Juszczak	3–6, 1–6
Win	1–1	Jun 2023	M15 Štore, Slovenia	WTT	Clay	(Czech Republic) Dominik Kellovský	6–4, 6–0
Win	2–1	Aug 2023	M15 Arequipa, Peru	WTT	Clay	(Argentina) Guido Iván Justo	6–4, 6–3
Loss	2–2	Sep 2023	M15 Punta del Este, Uruguay	WTT	Clay	(United States) Bruno Kuzuhara	7–6^{(7–3)}, 1–6, 3–6
Win	3–2	Oct 2023	M25 Luján, Argentina	WTT	Clay	(Argentina) Luciano Emanuel Ambrogi	3–6, 6–3, 7–6^{(7–3)}
Loss	3–3	Feb 2024	M25 Punta del Este, Uruguay	WTT	Clay	(Bolivia) Murkel Dellien	1–6, 0–6
Win	4–3	Feb 2025	M25 Punta del Este, Uruguay	WTT	Clay	(Argentina) Mariano Kestelboim	6–1, 6–2

=== Doubles: 4 (1 title, 3 runner-ups) ===
Legend ITF WTT (1–3)	Finals by surface Hard (0–0) Clay (1–3)

Result	W–L	Date	Tournament	Tier	Surface	Partner	Opponents	Score
Loss	0–1	Oct 2021	M25 Guayaquil, Ecuador	WTT	Clay	(Ecuador) Ángel Díaz Jalil	(Argentina) Facundo Juárez (Mexico) Luis Patiño	3–6, 4–6
Loss	0–2	Jul 2022	M15 Aprilia, Italy	WTT	Clay	(Peru) Gonzalo Bueno	(Argentina) Franco Emanuel Egea (Argentina) Gabriel Alejandro Hidalgo	2–6, 3–6
Win	1–2	Jul 2022	M15 Gubbio, Italy	WTT	Clay	(Peru) Gonzalo Bueno	(Italy) Francesco Forti (Italy) Gabriele Piraino	walkover
Loss	1–3	Mar 2023	M15 Naples, USA	WTT	Clay	(Peru) Gonzalo Bueno	(Argentina) Ignacio Monzón (Argentina) Federico Agustín Gómez	3–6, 2–6
