= 2014 Seguros Bolívar Open Bogotá =

- Date: 11–17 August
- Edition: 6th
- Category: ITF Women's Circuit
- Prize money: $100,000+H
- Surface: Clay
- Location: Bogotá, Colombia

Champions

Singles
- (Spain) Lara Arruabarrena

Doubles
- (Spain) Lara Arruabarrena / (Argentina) Florencia Molinero
← 2011 ·	Seguros Bolívar Open Bogotá	· 2015 →

The 2014 Seguros Bolívar Open Bogotá was a professional tennis tournament played on outdoor clay courts. It was the sixth edition of the tournament which was part of the 2014 ITF Women's Circuit, offering a total of $100,000+H in prize money. It took place in Bogotá, Colombia, on 11–17 August 2014.

== Singles main draw entrants ==
=== Seeds ===
Country	Player	Rank^{1}	Seed
AUT	Patricia Mayr-Achleitner	83	1
ESP	Lara Arruabarrena	95	2
SWE	Johanna Larsson	106	3
ESP	Lourdes Domínguez Lino	138	4
SLO	Tadeja Majerič	190	5
COL	Mariana Duque	193	6
GEO	Sofia Shapatava	195	7
ARG	María Irigoyen	202	8

- ^{1} Rankings as of 4 August 2014

=== Other entrants ===
The following players received wildcards into the singles main draw:

- (Colombia) Laura Arciniegas
- (Colombia) Yuliana Lizarazo
- (Colombia) Daniela Pedraza Novak
- (Colombia) María Paulina Pérez

The following players received entry from the qualifying draw:

- (United States) Alexa Guarachi
- (Germany) Tatjana Maria
- (Paraguay) Ana Paula Neffa de los Ríos
- (Mexico) Marcela Zacarías

== Champions ==
=== Singles ===
- (Spain) Lara Arruabarrena def. (Sweden) Johanna Larsson 6–1, 6–3

=== Doubles ===
- (Spain) Lara Arruabarrena / (Argentina) Florencia Molinero def. (Austria) Melanie Klaffner / (Austria) Patricia Mayr-Achleitner 6–2, 6–0
