= 2023 Open Bogotá – Singles =

Singles
- 2023 Open Bogotá

Final
- Champion: (Argentina) Thiago Agustín Tirante
- Runner-up: (Brazil) Gustavo Heide
- Score: Walkover

Events
Singles	Doubles
← 2022 ·	Open Bogotá	· 2024 →

Juan Pablo Ficovich was the defending champion but lost in the first round to Elmar Ejupovic.

Thiago Agustín Tirante won the title after Gustavo Heide withdrew from the final.

== Seeds ==
1. (Chile) Tomás Barrios Vera (semifinals)
2. (Chile) Alejandro Tabilo (quarterfinals)
3. (Bolivia) Hugo Dellien (first round)
4. (Argentina) Thiago Agustín Tirante (champion)
5. (Argentina) Santiago Rodríguez Taverna (first round)
6. (Argentina) Juan Pablo Ficovich (first round)
7. (Dominican Republic) Nick Hardt (second round)
8. (Argentina) Renzo Olivo (quarterfinals)

== Draw ==
=== Key ===
- Q = Qualifier
- WC = Wild card
- LL = Lucky loser
- Alt = Alternate
- ITF = ITF entry
- PR = Protected ranking
- SR = Special ranking
- SE = Special exempt
- JE = Junior exempt
- JR = Junior Accelerator Programme entrant
- CO = College Accelerator Programme entrant
- NG = Next Gen Accelerator Program entrant
- w/o = Walkover
- r = Retired
- d = Defaulted

=== Finals ===
Semifinals
1	(Chile) Tomás Barrios Vera	2	4
4	(Argentina) Thiago Agustín Tirante	6	6
(Brazil) Gustavo Heide	7^{7}	6
(Spain) David Jordà Sanchis	6^{3}	4

Final
4	(Argentina) Thiago Agustín Tirante	w/o
(Brazil) Gustavo Heide

=== Top half ===
First round
1	(Chile) T Barrios Vera	6	6
WC	(Colombia) Alejandro Hoyos	3	2
Q	(Brazil) Gilbert Klier Júnior	6	6
Q	(Chile) M Soto	4	2
Q	(Italy) Lorenzo Claverie	7^{7}	7^{7}
(Chile) G Lama	6^{3}	6^{5}
(Colombia) N Mejía	5	6	2
8	(Argentina) R Olivo	7	1	6
4	(Argentina) TA Tirante	5	6	7^{7}
Q	(Jamaica) B Bicknell	7	2	6^{3}
(Norway) V Durasovic	6	4	6
(Brazil) JL Reis da Silva	3	6	3
(Bolivia) M Dellien	3	6	7
WC	(Colombia) A Soriano Barrera	6	3	5
(Brazil) O Luz	6^{5}	4
7	(Dominican Republic) N Hardt	7^{7}	6

Second round
1	(Chile) T Barrios Vera	6	3	7^{7}
Q	(Brazil) G Klier Júnior	2	6	6^{2}
Q	(Italy) L Claverie	5	1
8	(Argentina) R Olivo	7	6
4	(Argentina) TA Tirante	7^{7}	6^{4}	7^{9}
(Norway) V Durasovic	6^{4}	7^{7}	6^{7}
(Bolivia) M Dellien	6	6
7	(Dominican Republic) N Hardt	3	2

Quarterfinals
1	(Chile) T Barrios Vera	7^{7}	6
8	(Argentina) R Olivo	6^{2}	2
4	(Argentina) TA Tirante	6	6
(Bolivia) M Dellien	4	4

Semifinals
1	(Chile) T Barrios Vera	2	4
4	(Argentina) TA Tirante	6	6

=== Bottom half ===
First round
5	(Argentina) S Rodríguez Taverna	5	6	4
(Argentina) A Barrena	7	1	6
(Brazil) M Pucinelli de Almeida	6	6
Q	(Brazil) J Pereira	4	4
(France) M Janvier	3	1^{r}
(Brazil) G Heide	6	4
(Brazil) E Ribeiro	6	2	6
3	(Bolivia) H Dellien	3	6	3
6	(Argentina) JP Ficovich	3	7^{7}	6^{3}
(Germany) Elmar Ejupovic	6	6^{0}	7^{7}
(United States) C Kingsley	4	6	4
(Spain) D Jordà Sanchis	6	3	6
Q	(Peru) A Huertas del Pino	6^{5}	2
WC	(Colombia) Johan Alexander Rodríguez	7^{7}	6
(Zimbabwe) B Lock	4	6	6^{7}
2	(Chile) A Tabilo	6	2	7^{9}

Second round
(Argentina) A Barrena	1	3
(Brazil) M Pucinelli de Almeida	6	6
(Brazil) G Heide	6	6
(Brazil) E Ribeiro	4	4
(Germany) E Ejupovic	6^{4}	3
(Spain) D Jordà Sanchis	7^{7}	6
WC	(Colombia) JA Rodríguez	3	7	1
2	(Chile) A Tabilo	6	5	6

Quarterfinals
(Brazil) M Pucinelli de Almeida	4	2
(Brazil) G Heide	6	6
(Spain) D Jordà Sanchis	7^{9}	6^{8}	6
2	(Chile) A Tabilo	6^{7}	7^{10}	3

Semifinals
(Brazil) G Heide	7^{7}	6
(Spain) D Jordà Sanchis	6^{3}	4
