= 2014 Seguros Bolívar Open Bogotá – Doubles =

Doubles
- 2014 Seguros Bolívar Open Bogotá

Final
- Champions: (Spain) Lara Arruabarrena (Argentina) Florencia Molinero
- Runners-up: (Austria) Melanie Klaffner (Austria) Patricia Mayr-Achleitner
- Score: 6–2, 6–0

Events
Singles	Doubles
← 2013 ·	Seguros Bolívar Open Bogotá	· 2015 →

Andrea Gámiz and Adriana Pérez were the defending champions, having won the previous event in 2011, but both players chose not to participate.

The second seeds Lara Arruabarrena and Florencia Molinero won the title, defeating Melanie Klaffner and Patricia Mayr-Achleitner in the final, 6–2, 6–0.

== Seeds ==
1. (Colombia) Mariana Duque / (Argentina) María Irigoyen (first round)
2. (Spain) Lara Arruabarrena / (Argentina) Florencia Molinero (champions)
3. (Spain) Lourdes Domínguez Lino / (Spain) Beatriz García Vidagany (semifinals)
4. (Germany) Tatjana Maria / (Australia) Arina Rodionova (quarterfinals)

== Draw ==
=== Key ===
- Q = Qualifier
- WC = Wild card
- LL = Lucky loser
- Alt = Alternate
- SE = Special exempt
- PR = Protected ranking
- ITF = ITF entry
- JE = Junior exempt
- w/o = Walkover
- r = Retired
- d = Defaulted
- SR = Special ranking

First round
1	(Colombia) M Duque (Argentina) M Irigoyen	2	6^{6}
(Argentina) V Furlanetto (Colombia) Y Lizarazo	6	7^{8}
(Brazil) MF Alves (South Africa) C Simmonds	4	7^{7}	[5]
WC	(Austria) M Klaffner (Austria) P Mayr-Achleitner	6	6^{1}	[10]
3	(Spain) L Domínguez Lino (Spain) B García Vidagany	6	6
WC	(Colombia) MP Pérez (Colombia) PA Pérez	2	2
(Paraguay) M González (Argentina) C Pella	7	4	[5]
(Japan) A Okuno (Brazil) N Rossi	5	6	[10]
(Russia) M Shamayko (Georgia (country)) S Shapatava	4	3
(Chinese Taipei) C-y Hsu (Bulgaria) E Kostova	6	6
(Mexico) AS Sánchez (Mexico) M Zacarías	6^{3}	6^{5}
4	(Germany) T Maria (Australia) Ar Rodionova	7^{7}	7^{7}
(United States) J Abaza (United States) A Guarachi	6	6
(Slovenia) T Majerič (United States) A Riley	2	4
WC	(Russia) A Pivovarova (Italy) G Sanesi	5	3
2	(Spain) L Arruabarrena (Argentina) F Molinero	7	6

Quarterfinals
(Argentina) V Furlanetto (Colombia) Y Lizarazo	7	1	[8]
WC	(Austria) M Klaffner (Austria) P Mayr-Achleitner	5	6	[10]
3	(Spain) L Domínguez Lino (Spain) B García Vidagany	6	6
(Japan) A Okuno (Brazil) N Rossi	1	0
(Chinese Taipei) C-y Hsu (Bulgaria) E Kostova	7^{7}	6
4	(Germany) T Maria (Australia) Ar Rodionova	6^{1}	2
(United States) J Abaza (United States) A Guarachi	5	4
2	(Spain) L Arruabarrena (Argentina) F Molinero	7	6

Semifinals
WC	(Austria) M Klaffner (Austria) P Mayr-Achleitner	2	6	[11]
3	(Spain) L Domínguez Lino (Spain) B García Vidagany	6	4	[9]
(Chinese Taipei) C-y Hsu (Bulgaria) E Kostova	4	6	[5]
2	(Spain) L Arruabarrena (Argentina) F Molinero	6	2	[10]

Final
WC	(Austria) M Klaffner (Austria) P Mayr-Achleitner	2	0
2	(Spain) L Arruabarrena (Argentina) F Molinero	6	6
