= 2021 Open Bogotá =

- Date: 18–24 October
- Edition: 13th
- Surface: Clay
- Location: Bogotá, Colombia

Champions

Singles
- (Austria) Gerald Melzer

Doubles
- (Chile) Nicolás Jarry / (Ecuador) Roberto Quiroz
← 2017 ·	Open Bogotá	· 2022 →

The 2021 Open Bogotá was a professional tennis tournament played on clay courts. It was the thirteenth edition of the tournament which was part of the 2021 ATP Challenger Tour. It took place in Bogotá, Colombia between 18 and 24 October 2021.

== Singles main-draw entrants ==
=== Seeds ===
Country	Player	Rank^{1}	Seed
COL	Daniel Elahi Galán	105	1
GER	Daniel Altmaier	114	2
CZE	Vít Kopřiva	198	3
CHI	Nicolás Jarry	217	4
ARG	Facundo Mena	245	5
NED	Jesper de Jong	246	6
USA	Ulises Blanch	256	7
TUN	Malek Jaziri	287	8

- ^{1} Rankings are as of 4 October 2021.

=== Other entrants ===
The following players received wildcards into the singles main draw:

- (Colombia) Alejandro Gómez
- (Colombia) Juan Sebastián Gómez
- (Colombia) Enrique Peña

The following player received entry into the singles main draw using a protected ranking:

- (Austria) Gerald Melzer

The following player received entry into the singles main draw as an alternate:

- (Argentina) Matías Zukas

The following players received entry from the qualifying draw:

- (Colombia) Nicolás Barrientos
- (Switzerland) Luca Castelnuovo
- (France) Enzo Couacaud
- (Czech Republic) Jaroslav Pospíšil

== Champions ==
=== Singles ===
- (Austria) Gerald Melzer def. (Argentina) Facundo Mena 6–2, 3–6, 7–6^{(7–5)}.

=== Doubles ===
- (Chile) Nicolás Jarry / (Ecuador) Roberto Quiroz def. (Colombia) Nicolás Barrientos / (Colombia) Alejandro Gómez 6–7^{(4–7)}, 7–5, [10–4].
