= 2014 Seguros Bolívar Open Bogotá – Singles =

Singles
- 2014 Seguros Bolívar Open Bogotá

Final
- Champion: (Spain) Lara Arruabarrena
- Runner-up: (Sweden) Johanna Larsson
- Score: 6–1, 6–3

Events
Singles	Doubles
← 2013 ·	Seguros Bolívar Open Bogotá	· 2015 →

Mariana Duque was the defending champion, having won the previous event in 2011, but lost in the semifinals to Johanna Larsson.

Lara Arruabarrena won the tournament, defeating Larsson in the final, 6–1, 6–3.

== Seeds ==
1. (Austria) Patricia Mayr-Achleitner (quarterfinals)
2. (Spain) Lara Arruabarrena (champion)
3. (Sweden) Johanna Larsson (final)
4. (Spain) Lourdes Domínguez Lino (semifinals)
5. (Slovenia) Tadeja Majerič (quarterfinals)
6. (Colombia) Mariana Duque (semifinals)
7. (Georgia (country)) Sofia Shapatava (first round)
8. (Argentina) María Irigoyen (quarterfinals)

== Main draw ==
=== Key ===
- Q = Qualifier
- WC = Wild card
- LL = Lucky loser
- Alt = Alternate
- SE = Special exempt
- PR = Protected ranking
- ITF = ITF entry
- JE = Junior exempt
- w/o = Walkover
- r = Retired
- d = Defaulted
- SR = Special ranking

=== Finals ===
Semifinals
6	(Colombia) Mariana Duque	6^{5}	6	6^{6}
3	(Sweden) Johanna Larsson	7^{7}	4	7^{8}
4	(Spain) Lourdes Domínguez Lino	6	6^{4}	1
2	(Spain) Lara Arruabarrena	4	7^{7}	6

Final
3	(Sweden) Johanna Larsson	1	3
2	(Spain) Lara Arruabarrena	6	6

=== Top half ===
First round
1	(Austria) P Mayr-Achleitner	2	6	7^{7}
WC	(Colombia) Y Lizarazo	6	3	6^{5}
(Argentina) F Molinero	6	1	0
(Russia) M Shamayko	0	6	6
WC	(Colombia) MP Pérez	0	2
(Paraguay) M González	6	6
Q	(Mexico) M Zacarías	2	2
6	(Colombia) M Duque	6	6
3	(Sweden) J Larsson	7^{7}	6
(Austria) M Klaffner	6^{5}	3
(Italy) G Sanesi	6	6
(Mexico) AS Sánchez	1	1
(Chile) A Koch Benvenuto	0^{r}
(South Africa) C Simmonds	3
(Bulgaria) E Kostova	6	6
7	(Georgia (country)) S Shapatava	3	2

Second round
1	(Austria) P Mayr-Achleitner	7^{8}	6
(Russia) M Shamayko	6^{6}	3
(Paraguay) M González	6	6^{4}	4
6	(Colombia) M Duque	3	7^{7}	6
3	(Sweden) J Larsson	6	6
(Italy) G Sanesi	3	3
(South Africa) C Simmonds	0	0
(Bulgaria) E Kostova	6	6

Quarterfinals
1	(Austria) P Mayr-Achleitner	2	2
6	(Colombia) M Duque	6	6
3	(Sweden) J Larsson	6	5	7^{9}
(Bulgaria) E Kostova	1	7	6^{7}

Semifinals
6	(Colombia) M Duque	6^{5}	6	6^{6}
3	(Sweden) J Larsson	7^{7}	4	7^{8}

=== Bottom half ===
First round
8	(Argentina) M Irigoyen	3	6	7
(Chinese Taipei) C-y Hsu	6	2	5
(Argentina) C Pella	1	1
Q	(Germany) T Maria	6	6
Q	(Paraguay) AP Neffa de los Ríos	6	6^{8}	6
(Russia) P Vinogradova	3	7^{10}	3
(Australia) Ar Rodionova	1	2
4	(Spain) L Domínguez Lino	6	6
5	(Slovenia) T Majerič	6	6
(Argentina) V Furlanetto	4	4
(Spain) B García Vidagany	6	7^{7}
Q	(United States) A Guarachi	2	6^{2}
WC	(Colombia) L Arciniegas	6	7^{7}
WC	(Colombia) D Pedraza Novak	2	6^{2}
(Brazil) N Rossi	3	1
2	(Spain) L Arruabarrena	6	6

Second round
8	(Argentina) M Irigoyen	6	6
Q	(Germany) T Maria	2	4
Q	(Paraguay) AP Neffa de los Ríos	2	0
4	(Spain) L Domínguez Lino	6	6
5	(Slovenia) T Majerič	7^{7}	6
(Spain) B García Vidagany	6^{3}	0
WC	(Colombia) L Arciniegas	0	0
2	(Spain) L Arruabarrena	6	6

Quarterfinals
8	(Argentina) M Irigoyen	3	4
4	(Spain) L Domínguez Lino	6	6
5	(Slovenia) T Majerič	2	0
2	(Spain) L Arruabarrena	6	6

Semifinals
4	(Spain) L Domínguez Lino	6	6^{4}	1
2	(Spain) L Arruabarrena	4	7^{7}	6
