= 2012 Open Seguros Bolívar – Doubles =

Doubles
- 2012 Open Seguros Bolívar

Final
- Champions: (Brazil) Marcelo Demoliner (Dominican Republic) Víctor Estrella
- Runners-up: (Italy) Thomas Fabbiano (Italy) Riccardo Ghedin
- Score: 6–4, 6–2

Events
Singles	Doubles
← 2011 ·	Open Seguros Bolívar	· 2013 →

Treat Conrad Huey and Izak van der Merwe were the defending champions but decided not to participate.
Marcelo Demoliner and Víctor Estrella defeated Thomas Fabbiano and Riccardo Ghedin 6–4, 6–2 in the final to win the tournament.

== Seeds ==
1. (Argentina) Guido Andreozzi / (Brazil) Fernando Romboli (first round)
2. (Chile) Jorge Aguilar / (Mexico) Daniel Garza (semifinal)
3. (Italy) Claudio Grassi / (Italy) Luca Vanni (first round)
4. (Argentina) Guillermo Durán / (Argentina) Renzo Olivo (quarterfinals)

== Draw ==
=== Key ===
- Q = Qualifier
- WC = Wild card
- LL = Lucky loser
- Alt = Alternate
- SE = Special exempt
- PR = Protected ranking
- ITF = ITF entry
- JE = Junior exempt
- w/o = Walkover
- r = Retired
- d = Defaulted
- SR = Special ranking

=== Draw ===
First round
1	(Argentina) G Andreozzi (Brazil) F Romboli	3	6	[7]
WC	(Colombia) JS Gómez (United States) M Sykut	6	4	[10]
(Italy) T Fabbiano (Italy) R Ghedin	7^{7}	6
(Brazil) R Hocevar (Brazil) L Kirche	6^{4}	3
4	(Argentina) Guillermo Durán (Argentina) R Olivo	6	6^{5}	[10]
(United States) A Collarini (Argentina) A Velotti	3	7^{7}	[8]
(Uruguay) M Cuevas (France) É Prodon	3	0
(Peru) S Galdós (Argentina) G Pella	6	6
(Ecuador) JC Campozano (Colombia) A González	6	1	[7]
(Brazil) M Demoliner (Dominican Republic) V Estrella	4	6	[10]
WC	(United States) Sam Barnett (United States) K Kim	6	6
3	(Italy) Claudio Grassi (Italy) L Vanni	2	2
WC	(Colombia) N Barrientos (Colombia) F Mantilla	3	4
(Colombia) C Salamanca (Colombia) E Struvay	6	6
(Argentina) F Argüello (Argentina) Diego Schwartzmann	3	6	[4]
2	(Chile) J Aguilar (Mexico) D Garza	6	0	[10]

Quarterfinals
WC	(Colombia) JS Gómez (United States) M Sykut	2	5
(Italy) T Fabbiano (Italy) R Ghedin	6	7
4	(Argentina) G Durán (Argentina) R Olivo	2	6	[6]
(Peru) S Galdós (Argentina) G Pella	6	2	[10]
(Brazil) M Demoliner (Dominican Republic) V Estrella	6	6
WC	(United States) S Barnett (United States) K Kim	2	3
(Colombia) C Salamanca (Colombia) E Struvay	4	6	[9]
2	(Chile) J Aguilar (Mexico) D Garza	6	3	[11]

Semifinals
(Italy) T Fabbiano (Italy) R Ghedin	1	7	[10]
(Peru) S Galdós (Argentina) G Pella	6	5	[4]
(Brazil) M Demoliner (Dominican Republic) V Estrella	3	6	[10]
2	(Chile) J Aguilar (Mexico) D Garza	6	3	[5]

Final
(Italy) T Fabbiano (Italy) R Ghedin	4	2
(Brazil) M Demoliner (Dominican Republic) V Estrella	6	6
