= 2023 Open Bogotá =

- Date: 25 September – 1 October
- Edition: 15th
- Surface: Clay
- Location: Bogotá, Colombia

Champions

Singles
- (Argentina) Thiago Agustín Tirante

Doubles
- (Argentina) Renzo Olivo / (Argentina) Thiago Agustín Tirante
| ← 2022 · | Open Bogotá | · 2024 → |

The 2023 Open Bogotá was a professional tennis tournament played on clay courts. It was the 15th edition of the tournament which was part of the 2023 ATP Challenger Tour. It took place in Bogotá, Colombia between 25 September and 1 October 2023.

== Singles main-draw entrants ==
=== Seeds ===
| Country | Player | Rank^{1} | Seed |
|---|---|---|---|
| CHI | Tomás Barrios Vera | 115 | 1 |
| CHI | Alejandro Tabilo | 125 | 2 |
| BOL | Hugo Dellien | 143 | 3 |
| ARG | Thiago Agustín Tirante | 145 | 4 |
| ARG | Santiago Rodríguez Taverna | 252 | 5 |
| ARG | Juan Pablo Ficovich | 262 | 6 |
| DOM | Nick Hardt | 274 | 7 |
| ARG | Renzo Olivo | 288 | 8 |

- ^{1} Rankings are as of 18 September 2023.

=== Other entrants ===
The following players received wildcards into the singles main draw:

- (Colombia) Alejandro Hoyos
- (Colombia) Johan Alexander Rodríguez
- (Colombia) Adrià Soriano Barrera

The following players received entry from the qualifying draw:

- (Jamaica) Blaise Bicknell
- (Italy) Lorenzo Claverie
- (Peru) Arklon Huertas del Pino
- (Brazil) Gilbert Klier Júnior
- (Brazil) José Pereira
- (Chile) Matías Soto

== Champions ==
=== Singles ===
- (Argentina) Thiago Agustín Tirante def. (Brazil) Gustavo Heide by walkover.

=== Doubles ===
- (Argentina) Renzo Olivo / (Argentina) Thiago Agustín Tirante def. (Argentina) Guillermo Durán / (Brazil) Orlando Luz 7–6^{(8–6)}, 6–4.
