= 2015 Open Bogotá – Singles =

Singles
- 2015 Open Bogotá

Final
- Champion: (Colombia) Eduardo Struvay
- Runner-up: (Italy) Paolo Lorenzi
- Score: 6–3, 4–6, 6–4

Events
Singles	Doubles
← 2013 ·	Open Bogotá	· 2016 →

Eduardo Struvay won his maiden title, beating Paolo Lorenzi 6–3, 4–6, 6–4

== Seeds ==
1. (Dominican Republic) Víctor Estrella Burgos (first round)
2. (Italy) Paolo Lorenzi (final)
3. (Colombia) Alejandro Falla (semifinals)
4. (Argentina) Horacio Zeballos (semifinals)
5. (Colombia) Alejandro González (quarterfinals)
6. (Brazil) João Souza (quarterfinals)
7. (Slovakia) Andrej Martin (first round)
8. (Chile) Hans Podlipnik Castillo (quarterfinals)

== Draw ==
=== Key ===
- Q = Qualifier
- WC = Wild card
- LL = Lucky loser
- Alt = Alternate
- SE = Special exempt
- PR = Protected ranking
- ITF = ITF entry
- JE = Junior exempt
- w/o = Walkover
- r = Retired
- d = Defaulted
- SR = Special ranking

=== Finals ===
Semifinals
(Colombia) Eduardo Struvay	7^{7}	4	6
4	(Argentina) Horacio Zeballos	6^{4}	6	3
3	(Colombia) Alejandro Falla	6	2	4
2	(Italy) Paolo Lorenzi	3	6	6

Final
(Colombia) Eduardo Struvay	6	4	6
2	(Italy) Paolo Lorenzi	3	6	4

=== Top half ===
First round
1	(Dominican Republic) V Estrella Burgos	3	3
(United Kingdom) A Ward	6	6
(Brazil) F Romboli	4	4
(Colombia) E Struvay	6	6
(Brazil) J Pereira	7	6^{5}	6
Q	(Bolivia) A Mendoza	5	7^{7}	4
(Chile) C Garín	4	6^{5}
6	(Brazil) J Souza	6	7^{7}
4	(Argentina) H Zeballos	6	6
(Argentina) Juan Ignacio Galarza	1	2
(Argentina) F Mena	6	4	6^{4}
Alt	(Chile) G Rivera Aránguiz	3	6	7^{7}
(Argentina) F Coria	3	4
(United States) A El Mihdawy	6	6
WC	(Colombia) C Rodríguez	6	6
7	(Slovakia) A Martin	4	4

Second round
(United Kingdom) A Ward	6^{4}	3
(Colombia) E Struvay	7^{7}	6
(Brazil) J Pereira	4	5
6	(Brazil) J Souza	6	7
4	(Argentina) H Zeballos	7^{9}	6
Alt	(Chile) G Rivera Aránguiz	6^{7}	3
(United States) A El Mihdawy	6^{0}	1
WC	(Colombia) C Rodríguez	7^{7}	6

Quarterfinals
(Colombia) E Struvay	7^{7}	6
6	(Brazil) J Souza	6^{5}	4
4	(Argentina) H Zeballos	6	4	7^{7}
WC	(Colombia) C Rodríguez	3	6	6^{5}

Semifinals
(Colombia) E Struvay	7^{7}	4	6
4	(Argentina) H Zeballos	6^{4}	6	3

=== Bottom half ===
First round
8	(Chile) H Podlipnik Castillo	6	6^{7}	7
WC	(Dominican Republic) J Olivares	3	7^{9}	5
(Colombia) N Barrientos	4	3
(El Salvador) M Arévalo	6	6
Q	(Colombia) Felipe Mantilla	6	7^{7}
(Argentina) H Casanova	3	6^{5}
Q	(South Africa) D O'Brien	3	5
3	(Colombia) A Falla	6	7
5	(Colombia) A González	6	6
WC	(Colombia) DE Galán	3	4
(Brazil) C Zampieri	6	6
WC	(Japan) Riki Oshima	2	2
Q	(Germany) G Kretschmer	6	3	4
(Argentina) T Lipovšek Puches	0	6	6
(Chile) G Lama	3	3
2	(Italy) P Lorenzi	6	6

Second round
8	(Chile) H Podlipnik Castillo	6	6
(El Salvador) M Arévalo	3	2
Q	(Colombia) F Mantilla	5	2
3	(Colombia) A Falla	7	6
5	(Colombia) A González	6	6
(Brazil) C Zampieri	1	2
(Argentina) T Lipovšek Puches	3	1
2	(Italy) P Lorenzi	6	6

Quarterfinals
8	(Chile) H Podlipnik Castillo	2	3
3	(Colombia) A Falla	6	6
5	(Colombia) A González	4	4
2	(Italy) P Lorenzi	6	6

Semifinals
3	(Colombia) A Falla	6	2	4
2	(Italy) P Lorenzi	3	6	6
