= 2023 Open Bogotá – Doubles =

Doubles
- 2023 Open Bogotá

Final
- Champions: (Argentina) Renzo Olivo (Argentina) Thiago Agustín Tirante
- Runners-up: (Argentina) Guillermo Durán (Brazil) Orlando Luz
- Score: 7–6^{(8–6)}, 6–4

Events
Singles	Doubles
← 2022 ·	Open Bogotá	· 2024 →

Nicolás Mejía and Andrés Urrea were the defending champions but lost in the first round to Renzo Olivo and Thiago Agustín Tirante.

Olivo and Tirante won the title after defeating Guillermo Durán and Orlando Luz 7–6^{(8–6)}, 6–4 in the final.

This tournament was supposed to mark the last professional tournament of Colombian former world number 1 doubles players Juan Sebastián Cabal and Robert Farah before their retirement from professional tennis. However, Cabal was forced to withdraw due to injury and retirement plans were placed on hold.

== Seeds ==
1. (France) Théo Arribagé / (France) Luca Sanchez (quarterfinals)
2. (Colombia) Juan Sebastián Cabal / (Colombia) Robert Farah (withdrew)
3. (Ecuador) Diego Hidalgo / (Colombia) Cristian Rodríguez (semifinals)
4. (Bolivia) Boris Arias / (Bolivia) Federico Zeballos (semifinals)
5. (Argentina) Guillermo Durán / (Brazil) Orlando Luz (final)

== Draw ==
=== Key ===
- Q = Qualifier
- WC = Wild card
- LL = Lucky loser
- Alt = Alternate
- ITF = ITF entry
- PR = Protected ranking
- SR = Special ranking
- SE = Special exempt
- JE = Junior exempt
- JR = Junior Accelerator Programme entrant
- CO = College Accelerator Programme entrant
- NG = Next Gen Accelerator Program entrant
- w/o = Walkover
- r = Retired
- d = Defaulted

First round
1	(France) T Arribagé (France) L Sanchez	6	6
(Brazil) F Romboli (Brazil) M Zormann	3	4
WC	(Colombia) N Mejía (Colombia) A Urrea	2	2
(Argentina) R Olivo (Argentina) TA Tirante	6	6
3	(Ecuador) D Hidalgo (Colombia) C Rodríguez	3	7	[11]
(Switzerland) L Margaroli (Argentina) S Rodríguez Taverna	6	5	[9]
(Australia) C Puttergill (Australia) A Taylor	7^{7}	6^{4}	[13]
WC	(Colombia) JS Gómez (Colombia) A Soriano Barrera	6^{5}	7^{7}	[11]
(Peru) A Huertas del Pino (Peru) C Huertas del Pino	6^{5}	6	[4]
Alt	(Norway) V Durasovic (Spain) D Jordà Sanchis	7^{7}	2	[10]
(Bolivia) M Dellien (Argentina) JP Ficovich	2	0
4	(Bolivia) B Arias (Bolivia) F Zeballos	6	6
(Zimbabwe) B Lock (India) J Nedunchezhiyan	6	6^{5}	[10]
Alt	(Dominican Republic) N Hardt (Chile) M Soto	4	7^{7}	[6]
(United States) G Goldhoff (United States) V Kirkov	4	7^{7}	[6]
5	(Argentina) G Durán (Brazil) O Luz	6	6^{4}	[10]

Quarterfinals
1	(France) T Arribagé (France) L Sanchez	4	4
(Argentina) R Olivo (Argentina) TA Tirante	6	6
3	(Ecuador) D Hidalgo (Colombia) C Rodríguez	6	7^{7}
(Australia) C Puttergill (Australia) A Taylor	4	6^{5}
Alt	(Norway) V Durasovic (Spain) D Jordà Sanchis	4	2
4	(Bolivia) B Arias (Bolivia) F Zeballos	6	6
(Zimbabwe) B Lock (India) J Nedunchezhiyan	3	4
5	(Argentina) G Durán (Brazil) O Luz	6	6

Semifinals
(Argentina) R Olivo (Argentina) TA Tirante	7	6
3	(Ecuador) D Hidalgo (Colombia) C Rodríguez	5	2
4	(Bolivia) B Arias (Bolivia) F Zeballos	2	1
5	(Argentina) G Durán (Brazil) O Luz	6	6

Final
(Argentina) R Olivo (Argentina) TA Tirante	7^{8}	6
5	(Argentina) G Durán (Brazil) O Luz	6^{6}	4
