= 2011 Open Seguros Bolívar – Men's doubles =

Men's doubles
- 2011 Open Seguros Bolívar

Final
- Champions: (Philippines) Treat Conrad Huey (South Africa) Izak van der Merwe
- Runners-up: (Colombia) Juan Sebastián Cabal (Colombia) Robert Farah
- Score: 7–6^{(7–3)}, 6–7^{(5–7)}, [7–2], defaulted

Events
Singles	men	women
Doubles	men	women
← 2010 ·	Open Seguros Bolívar	· 2012 →

Juan Sebastián Cabal and Robert Farah were the defending champions and they reached the final.

Treat Conrad Huey and Izak van der Merwe won the title, defeating Cabal and Farah 7–6^{(7–3)}, 6–7^{(5–7)}, [7–2]. Cabal has thrown his racket to van der Merwe, and the referee decided to end the final, when van der Merwe/Huey win [7–2] in the super tie.

== Seeds ==
1. (Colombia) Juan Sebastián Cabal / (Colombia) Robert Farah (final)
2. (Philippines) Treat Conrad Huey / (South Africa) Izak van der Merwe (champions)
3. (Dominican Republic) Víctor Estrella / (Brazil) João Souza (semifinals)
4. (Argentina) Brian Dabul / (Brazil) Fernando Romboli (semifinals)

== Draw ==
=== Key ===
- Q = Qualifier
- WC = Wild card
- LL = Lucky loser
- Alt = Alternate
- SE = Special exempt
- PR = Protected ranking
- ITF = ITF entry
- JE = Junior exempt
- w/o = Walkover
- r = Retired
- d = Defaulted
- SR = Special ranking

=== Draw ===
First round
1	(Colombia) JS Cabal (Colombia) R Farah	6	6
WC	(Colombia) JS Gómez (Colombia) Pedro Pablo Ruiz	3	1
(Argentina) Guillermo Durán (Chile) G Rivera-Aránguiz	2	6	[10]
(Colombia) A Falla (Colombia) A González	6	4	[7]
3	(Dominican Republic) V Estrella (Brazil) J Souza	7^{7}	6
(Italy) R Ghedin (Russia) D Matsukevich	6^{1}	4
(Colombia) N Barrientos (Chile) N Massú	6	6
WC	(Colombia) F Mantilla (Colombia) E Struvay	3	4
(Argentina) F Argüello (Argentina) Diego Sebastián Schwartzman	4	4
WC	(Colombia) Tomas Builes (Colombia) Sebastián López	6	6
(Germany) A Begemann (Italy) M Marrai	3	3
4	(Argentina) B Dabul (Brazil) F Romboli	6	6
(Argentina) S Decoud (Argentina) H Zeballos	6	6
(Chile) P Capdeville (Colombia) C Salamanca	4	2
(Brazil) D Dutra da Silva (Brazil) R Dutra da Silva	4	1
2	(Philippines) TC Huey (South Africa) I van der Merwe	6	6

Quarterfinals
1	(Colombia) JS Cabal (Colombia) R Farah	6	6
(Argentina) Guillermo Durán (Chile) G Rivera-Aránguiz	4	1
3	(Dominican Republic) V Estrella (Brazil) J Souza
(Colombia) N Barrientos (Chile) N Massú	w/o
WC	(Colombia) Tomas Builes (Colombia) Sebastián López	0	0
4	(Argentina) B Dabul (Brazil) F Romboli	6	6
(Argentina) S Decoud (Argentina) H Zeballos	6^{5}	4
2	(Philippines) TC Huey (South Africa) I van der Merwe	7^{7}	6

Semifinals
1	(Colombia) JS Cabal (Colombia) R Farah	7^{7}	6^{6}	[10]
3	(Dominican Republic) V Estrella (Brazil) J Souza	6^{5}	7^{8}	[7]
4	(Argentina) B Dabul (Brazil) F Romboli	3	6^{4}
2	(Philippines) TC Huey (South Africa) I van der Merwe	6	7^{7}

Final
1	(Colombia) JS Cabal (Colombia) R Farah	6^{3}	7^{7}	[2]^{d}
2	(Philippines) TC Huey (South Africa) I van der Merwe	7^{7}	6^{5}	[7]
