= 2025 Open Bogotá =

- Date: 12 – 17 May
- Edition: 17th
- Surface: Clay
- Location: Bogotá, Colombia

Champions

Singles
- (United States) Patrick Kypson

Doubles
- (Brazil) Luís Britto / (Czech Republic) Zdeněk Kolář
- Open Bogotá

The 2025 Kia Open Bogotá was a professional tennis tournament played on clay courts. It was the 17th edition of the tournament which was part of the 2025 ATP Challenger Tour. It took place in Bogotá, Colombia between 12 and 17 May 2025.

== Singles main-draw entrants ==
=== Seeds ===
Country	Player	Rank^{1}	Seed
COL	Nicolás Mejía	227	1
CHI	Matías Soto	242	2
BRA	Karue Sell	299	3
~~BRA~~	~~Matheus Pucinelli de Almeida~~	~~306~~	~~4~~
ESP	Nicolás Álvarez Varona	314	5
BRA	Mateus Alves	322	6
BRA	Pedro Sakamoto	353	7
ARG	Renzo Olivo	354	8

- ^{1} Rankings are as of 5 May 2025.

=== Other entrants ===
The following players received wildcards into the singles main draw:

- (Colombia) Samuel Heredia
- (Colombia) Salvador Price
- (Colombia) Miguel Tobón

The following player received entry into the singles main draw using a protected ranking:

- (Peru) Arklon Huertas del Pino

The following players received entry from the qualifying draw:

- (Brazil) Mateo Barreiros Reyes
- (Colombia) Juan Sebastián Gómez
- (Argentina) Ignacio Monzón
- (Chile) Daniel Antonio Núñez
- (Brazil) Pedro Rodrigues
- (Colombia) Johan Alexander Rodríguez

The following player received entry as a lucky loser:

- (United States) Tristan McCormick

== Champions ==
=== Singles ===
- (United States) Patrick Kypson def. (Brazil) Pedro Sakamoto 6–1, 6–3.

=== Doubles ===
- (Brazil) Luís Britto / (Czech Republic) Zdeněk Kolář def. (Peru) Arklon Huertas del Pino / (Peru) Conner Huertas del Pino 6–4, 7–6^{(7–4)}.
