= 2012 Open Seguros Bolívar – Singles =

Singles
- 2012 Open Seguros Bolívar

Final
- Champion: (Colombia) Alejandro Falla
- Runner-up: (Colombia) Santiago Giraldo
- Score: 7–5, 6–3

Events
Singles	Doubles
← 2011 ·	Open Seguros Bolívar	· 2013 →

Feliciano López was the defending champion but lost in the first round.
Alejandro Falla won the final against Santiago Giraldo 7–5, 6–3.

== Seeds ==
1. (Spain) Feliciano López (first round)
2. (Colombia) Santiago Giraldo (final)
3. (Colombia) Alejandro Falla (champion)
4. (France) Éric Prodon (first round)
5. (Colombia) Carlos Salamanca (second round)
6. (Argentina) Guido Pella (second round)
7. (Colombia) Alejandro González (second round)
8. (Dominican Republic) Víctor Estrella (semifinals)

== Draw ==
=== Key ===
- Q = Qualifier
- WC = Wild card
- LL = Lucky loser
- Alt = Alternate
- SE = Special exempt
- PR = Protected ranking
- ITF = ITF entry
- JE = Junior exempt
- w/o = Walkover
- r = Retired
- d = Defaulted
- SR = Special ranking

=== Finals ===
Semifinals
8	(Dominican Republic) Víctor Estrella	3	4
3	(Colombia) Alejandro Falla	6	6
(Ecuador) Júlio César Campozano	6^{4}	6^{4}
2/WC	(Colombia) Santiago Giraldo	7^{7}	7^{7}

Final
3	(Colombia) Alejandro Falla	7	6
2/WC	(Colombia) Santiago Giraldo	5	3

=== Top half ===
First round
1/WC	(Spain) F López	6^{4}	4
(Argentina) G Andreozzi	7^{7}	6
Alt	(Brazil) M Demoliner	7^{8}	6
(Colombia) E Struvay	6^{6}	4
(Brazil) R Hocevar	6	3	4
(Italy) Claudio Grassi	3	6	6
(Argentina) Diego Schwartzman	2	6^{3}
8	(Dominican Republic) V Estrella	6	7^{7}
3	(Colombia) A Falla	6	6
Q	(Italy) Erik Crepaldi	2	2
(Italy) R Ghedin	7	6
WC	(Colombia) M Quintero	5	3
(Chile) G Rivera Aránguiz	2	1
(Argentina) F Argüello	6	6
WC	(Chile) Gonzalo Lama	2	2
6	(Argentina) G Pella	6	6

Second round
(Argentina) G Andreozzi	6	3	2
Alt	(Brazil) M Demoliner	2	6	6
(Italy) Claudio Grassi	4	1
8	(Dominican Republic) V Estrella	6	6
3	(Colombia) A Falla	6	4	7
(Italy) R Ghedin	1	6	5
(Argentina) F Argüello	6	7^{7}
6	(Argentina) G Pella	2	6^{4}

Quarterfinals
Alt	(Brazil) M Demoliner	4	7^{8}	1
8	(Dominican Republic) V Estrella	6	6^{6}	6
3	(Colombia) A Falla	6	6
(Argentina) F Argüello	3	4

Semifinals
8	(Dominican Republic) V Estrella	3	4
3	(Colombia) A Falla	6	6

=== Bottom half ===
First round
5	(Colombia) C Salamanca	6	6
Q	(Guatemala) C Díaz Figueroa	1	4
(Ecuador) JC Campozano	6	6
(Chile) C Saavedra-Corvalán	1	1
Alt	(United States) A Collarini	6	3	3
(Chile) J Aguilar	3	6	6
(Brazil) F Romboli	7^{7}	5	7^{7}
4	(France) É Prodon	6^{5}	7	6^{4}
7	(Colombia) A González	5	7^{7}	6
(Argentina) A Velotti	7	6^{2}	4
Q	(Ecuador) R Quiroz	1	2
(Italy) L Vanni	6	6
(Brazil) L Kirche	6	7^{7}
Q	(Colombia) Nicolás Barrientos	4	6^{2}
(Italy) T Fabbiano	2	4
2/WC	(Colombia) S Giraldo	6	6

Second round
5	(Colombia) C Salamanca	6^{4}	3
(Ecuador) JC Campozano	7^{7}	6
(Chile) J Aguilar	6	6
(Brazil) F Romboli	4	3
7	(Colombia) A González	5	4
(Italy) L Vanni	7	6
(Brazil) L Kirche	6^{5}	6^{6}
2/WC	(Colombia) S Giraldo	7^{7}	7^{8}

Quarterfinals
(Ecuador) JC Campozano	6	6
(Chile) J Aguilar	2	4
(Italy) L Vanni	3	1
2/WC	(Colombia) S Giraldo	6	6

Semifinals
(Ecuador) JC Campozano	6^{4}	6^{4}
2/WC	(Colombia) S Giraldo	7^{7}	7^{7}
