= 2022 Open Bogotá =

- Date: 4–10 July
- Edition: 14th
- Surface: Clay
- Location: Bogotá, Colombia

Champions

Singles
- (Argentina) Juan Pablo Ficovich

Doubles
- (Colombia) Nicolás Mejía / (Colombia) Andrés Urrea
← 2021 ·	Open Bogotá	· 2023 →

The 2022 Open Bogotá was a professional tennis tournament played on clay courts. It was the fourteenth edition of the tournament which was part of the 2022 ATP Challenger Tour. It took place in Bogotá, Colombia between 4 and 10 July 2022.

== Singles main-draw entrants ==
=== Seeds ===
Country	Player	Rank^{1}	Seed
ARG	Facundo Mena	160	1
ARG	Juan Pablo Ficovich	163	2
BRA	Felipe Meligeni Alves	197	3
~~ARG~~	~~Francisco Comesaña~~	~~213~~	~~4~~
AUT	Gerald Melzer	247	5
CHI	Gonzalo Lama	263	6
SRB	Miljan Zekić	276	7
ARG	Gonzalo Villanueva	286	8
USA	Aleksandar Kovacevic	298	9

- ^{1} Rankings are as of 27 June 2022.

=== Other entrants ===
The following players received wildcards into the singles main draw:

- (Colombia) Nicolás Buitrago
- (Colombia) Sergio Luis Hernández Ramírez
- (Colombia) Andrés Urrea

The following players received entry from the qualifying draw:

- (Brazil) Mateus Alves
- (United Kingdom) Blu Baker
- (Peru) Arklon Huertas del Pino
- (Argentina) Ignacio Monzón
- (Japan) Naoki Nakagawa
- (Argentina) Matías Zukas

The following player received entry as a lucky loser:

- (India) Mukund Sasikumar

== Champions ==
=== Singles ===
- (Argentina) Juan Pablo Ficovich def. (Austria) Gerald Melzer 6–1, 6–2.

=== Doubles ===
- (Colombia) Nicolás Mejía / (Colombia) Andrés Urrea def. (Argentina) Ignacio Monzón / (Argentina) Gonzalo Villanueva 6–3, 6–4.
