= 2011 Open Seguros Bolívar – Men's singles =

Men's singles
- 2011 Open Seguros Bolívar

Final
- Champion: (Spain) Feliciano López
- Runner-up: (Colombia) Carlos Salamanca
- Score: 6–4, 6–3

Events
Singles	men	women
Doubles	men	women
← 2010 ·	Open Seguros Bolívar	· 2012 →

Robert Farah was the defending champion; however, Horacio Zeballos defeated him in the second round.
Feliciano López won the title, defeating Carlos Salamanca 6–4, 6–3 in the final.

== Seeds ==
1. (Spain) Feliciano López (champion)
2. (Colombia) Alejandro Falla (second round)
3. (Chile) Paul Capdeville (first round)
4. (Argentina) Horacio Zeballos (semifinals)
5. (Brazil) João Souza (quarterfinals)
6. (South Africa) Izak van der Merwe (semifinals)
7. (Brazil) Rogério Dutra da Silva (first round)
8. (Argentina) Brian Dabul (second round)

== Draw ==
=== Key ===
- Q = Qualifier
- WC = Wild card
- LL = Lucky loser
- Alt = Alternate
- SE = Special exempt
- PR = Protected ranking
- ITF = ITF entry
- JE = Junior exempt
- w/o = Walkover
- r = Retired
- d = Defaulted
- SR = Special ranking

=== Finals ===
Semifinals
1/WC	(Spain) Feliciano López	4	7	7^{7}
4	(Argentina) Horacio Zeballos	6	5	6^{0}
6	(South Africa) Izak van der Merwe	2	3
(Colombia) Carlos Salamanca	6	6

Final
1/WC	(Spain) Feliciano López	6	6
(Colombia) Carlos Salamanca	4	3

=== Top half ===
First round
1/WC	(Spain) F López	7	6
(Italy) R Ghedin	5	4
(Russia) D Matsukevich	6	6
(Germany) A Begemann	4	4
(Dominican Republic) V Estrella	7	7
WC	(Colombia) N Barrientos	5	5
Q	(Colombia) JS Gómez	2	6	0
5	(Brazil) J Souza	6	0	6
4	(Argentina) H Zeballos	6	6
LL	(Colombia) Felipe Mantilla	2	4
Q	(Argentina) Guillermo Durán	1	6^{5}
(Colombia) R Farah	6	7^{7}
(Chile) G Rivera-Aránguiz	6	6
LL	(Colombia) Felipe Escobar	2	2
(Argentina) S Decoud	4	2
8	(Argentina) B Dabul	6	6

Second round
1/WC	(Spain) F López	6	6
(Russia) D Matsukevich	3	4
(Dominican Republic) V Estrella	6	2	4
5	(Brazil) J Souza	4	6	6
4	(Argentina) H Zeballos	6	4	7
(Colombia) R Farah	4	6	5
(Chile) G Rivera-Aránguiz	6	3	6
8	(Argentina) B Dabul	4	6	4

Quarterfinals
1/WC	(Spain) F López	6	6
5	(Brazil) J Souza	4	1
4	(Argentina) H Zeballos	6	6^{9}	6
(Chile) G Rivera-Aránguiz	3	7^{11}	4

Semifinals
1/WC	(Spain) F López	4	7	7^{7}
4	(Argentina) H Zeballos	6	5	6^{0}

=== Bottom half ===
First round
6	(South Africa) I van der Merwe	7^{8}	3	7
(Argentina) Diego Schwartzman	6^{6}	6	5
(Brazil) D Dutra da Silva	2	3
Q	(Bolivia) Ryusei Makiguchi	6	6
WC	(Colombia) E Struvay	5	6	1
(Argentina) F Argüello	7	4	6
(Italy) M Marrai	6	6
3	(Chile) P Capdeville	4	3
7	(Brazil) R Dutra da Silva	2	5
(Colombia) A González	6	7
(Colombia) JS Cabal	6	6
(Brazil) F Romboli	0	4
(Colombia) C Salamanca	6	3	6
WC	(Chile) N Massú	3	6	1
Q	(Colombia) Sebastián López	0	2
2	(Colombia) A Falla	6	6

Second round
6	(South Africa) I van der Merwe	6^{3}	6	6
Q	(Bolivia) Ryusei Makiguchi	7^{7}	4	4
(Argentina) F Argüello	6	6
(Italy) M Marrai	4	4
(Colombia) A González	4	6	6
(Colombia) JS Cabal	6	2	2
(Colombia) C Salamanca	7	7
2	(Colombia) A Falla	5	5

Quarterfinals
6	(South Africa) I van der Merwe	6	2	6
(Argentina) F Argüello	2	6	4
(Colombia) A González	3	1
(Colombia) C Salamanca	6	6

Semifinals
6	(South Africa) I van der Merwe	2	3
(Colombia) C Salamanca	6	6
