= 2013 Open Seguros Bolívar =

- Date: 4–10 November
- Edition: 9th
- Surface: Clay
- Location: Bogotá, Colombia

Champions

Singles
- (Dominican Republic) Víctor Estrella Burgos

Doubles
- (Colombia) Juan Sebastián Cabal / (Colombia) Alejandro González
← 2012 ·	Open Seguros Bolívar	· 2015 →

The 2013 Open Seguros Bolívar was a professional tennis tournament played on clay courts. It was the ninth edition of the tournament which was part of the 2013 ATP Challenger Tour. It took place in Bogotá, Colombia between 4 and 10 November 2013.

== Singles main-draw entrants ==
=== Seeds ===
Country	Player	Rank^{1}	Seed
ARG	Horacio Zeballos	54	1
COL	Santiago Giraldo	80	2
ITA	Paolo Lorenzi	85	3
ARG	Leonardo Mayer	86	4
COL	Alejandro Falla	97	5
ARG	Guido Pella	100	6
COL	Alejandro González	108	7
ARG	Diego Sebastián Schwartzman	119	8

- ^{1} Rankings are as of October 28, 2013.

=== Other entrants ===
The following players received wildcards into the singles main draw:

- (Colombia) Nicolás Barrientos
- (Colombia) Juan Sebastián Cabal
- (Colombia) Carlos Salamanca
- (Argentina) Horacio Zeballos

The following players received entry from the qualifying draw:

- (Uruguay) Ariel Behar
- (Argentina) Juan Ignacio Londero
- (Germany) Jonas Luetjen
- (Italy) Gianluigi Quinzi

The following player entered the singles main draw as a lucky loser:

- (Portugal) Pedro Sousa

== Champions ==
=== Singles ===
- (Dominican Republic) Víctor Estrella Burgos def. (Brazil) Thomaz Bellucci 6–2, 3–0 retired

=== Doubles ===
- (Colombia) Juan Sebastián Cabal / (Colombia) Alejandro González def. (Colombia) Nicolás Barrientos / (Colombia) Eduardo Struvay 6–3, 6–2
