= 2017 Open Bogotá – Doubles =

Doubles
- 2017 Open Bogotá

Final
- Champions: (El Salvador) Marcelo Arévalo (Mexico) Miguel Ángel Reyes-Varela
- Runners-up: (Croatia) Nikola Mektić (Croatia) Franko Škugor
- Score: 6–3, 3–6, [10–6]

Events
Singles	Doubles
- Open Bogotá

Marcelo Arévalo and Sergio Galdós were the defending champions but chose to defend their title with different partners. Arévalo partnered Miguel Ángel Reyes-Varela and successfully defended his title. Galdós partnered Roberto Maytín but lost in the first round to Arévalo and Reyes-Varela.

Arévalo and Reyes-Varela won the title after defeating Nikola Mektić and Franko Škugor 6–3, 3–6, [10–6] in the final.

== Seeds ==
1. (Croatia) Nikola Mektić / (Croatia) Franko Škugor (final)
2. (Brazil) Fabiano de Paula / (Brazil) Fabrício Neis (semifinals, withdrew)
3. (Ecuador) Gonzalo Escobar / (Mexico) Hans Hach Verdugo (first round)
4. (Chile) Nicolás Jarry / (Ecuador) Roberto Quiroz (withdrew)

== Draw ==
Key

- Q = Qualifier
- WC = Wild card
- LL = Lucky loser
- Alt = Alternate
- ITF = ITF entry
- PR = Protected ranking
- SR = Special ranking
- SE = Special exempt
- JE = Junior exempt
- JR = Junior Accelerator Programme entrant
- CO = College Accelerator Programme entrant
- NG = Next Gen Accelerator Program entrant
- w/o = Walkover
- r = Retired
- d = Defaulted

First round
1	(Croatia) N Mektić (Croatia) F Škugor	7^{8}	6^{4}	[13]
WC	(Colombia) Felipe Mantilla (Colombia) C Rodríguez	6^{6}	7^{7}	[11]
WC	(Argentina) F Mena (Argentina) A Velotti	6	6
(Uruguay) M Felder (New Zealand) J Statham	4	0
Alt	(Argentina) JP Paz (Brazil) P Sakamoto	5	6^{2}
(Slovakia) A Martin (Austria) G Melzer	7	7^{7}
(Brazil) P Bernardi (Brazil) J Souza	5	3
(Colombia) A Falla (Colombia) DE Galán	7	6
(El Salvador) M Arévalo (Mexico) MÁ Reyes-Varela	7^{7}	6^{7}	[10]
(Peru) S Galdós (Venezuela) R Maytín	6^{3}	7^{9}	[5]
PR	(Colombia) A González (Brazil) JP Sorgi	6	6
3	(Ecuador) G Escobar (Mexico) H Hach Verdugo	3	4
WC	(Colombia) JS Gómez (Colombia) C Salamanca	6^{5}	4
(Argentina) JI Londero (Venezuela) LD Martínez	7^{7}	6
Alt	(Peru) M Echazú (Austria) M Linzer	3	2
2	(Brazil) F de Paula (Brazil) F Neis	6	6

Quarterfinals
1	(Croatia) N Mektić (Croatia) F Škugor	6	6
WC	(Argentina) F Mena (Argentina) A Velotti	4	2
(Slovakia) A Martin (Austria) G Melzer	4	1
(Colombia) A Falla (Colombia) DE Galán	6	6
(El Salvador) M Arévalo (Mexico) MÁ Reyes-Varela	6	6
PR	(Colombia) A González (Brazil) JP Sorgi	1	0
(Argentina) JI Londero (Venezuela) LD Martínez	5	2
2	(Brazil) F de Paula (Brazil) F Neis	7	6

Semifinals
1	(Croatia) N Mektić (Croatia) F Škugor	6^{5}	6	[10]
(Colombia) A Falla (Colombia) DE Galán	7^{7}	1	[8]
(El Salvador) M Arévalo (Mexico) MÁ Reyes-Varela	w/o
2	(Brazil) F de Paula (Brazil) F Neis

Final
1	(Croatia) N Mektić (Croatia) F Škugor	3	6	[6]
(El Salvador) M Arévalo (Mexico) MÁ Reyes-Varela	6	3	[10]
