= 2016 Open Bogotá – Doubles =

Doubles
- 2016 Open Bogotá

Final
- Champions: (El Salvador) Marcelo Arévalo (Peru) Sergio Galdós
- Runners-up: (Uruguay) Ariel Behar (Ecuador) Gonzalo Escobar
- Score: 6–4, 6–1

Events
Singles	Doubles
- Open Bogotá

Julio Peralta and Horacio Zeballos were the defending champions but chose not to defend their title.

Marcelo Arévalo and Sergio Galdós won the title after defeating Ariel Behar and Gonzalo Escobar 6–4, 6–1 in the final.

== Seeds ==
1. (El Salvador) Marcelo Arévalo / (Peru) Sergio Galdós (champions)
2. (Brazil) Fabrício Neis / (Brazil) Caio Zampieri (semifinals)
3. (Chile) Nicolás Jarry / (Chile) Hans Podlipnik (first round)
4. (Colombia) Nicolás Barrientos / (South Africa) Dean O'Brien (first round)

== Draw ==
Key

- Q = Qualifier
- WC = Wild card
- LL = Lucky loser
- Alt = Alternate
- ITF = ITF entry
- PR = Protected ranking
- SR = Special ranking
- SE = Special exempt
- JE = Junior exempt
- JR = Junior Accelerator Programme entrant
- CO = College Accelerator Programme entrant
- NG = Next Gen Accelerator Program entrant
- w/o = Walkover
- r = Retired
- d = Defaulted

First round
1	(El Salvador) M Arévalo (Peru) S Galdós	6	6
(Colombia) A Falla (Colombia) E Struvay	3	4
(Austria) M Linzer (Poland) K Majchrzak	1	2
(Belgium) A De Greef (Argentina) F Mena	6	6
4	(Colombia) N Barrientos (South Africa) D O'Brien	4	5
(Venezuela) LD Martínez (Brazil) F Romboli	6	7
WC	(United States) Andrew Ely (Brazil) Lucas Koelle	3	1
WC	(Colombia) A Gómez (Colombia) C Salamanca	6	6
(Uruguay) A Behar (Ecuador) G Escobar	6	6
WC	(Colombia) JS Gómez (Colombia) Felipe Mantilla	3	2
(Spain) Í Cervantes (Netherlands) M Vervoort	1	7	[10]
3	(Chile) N Jarry (Chile) H Podlipnik	6	5	[4]
(Ecuador) E Gómez (Ecuador) R Quiroz	7	6
(Brazil) A Ghem (Brazil) E Russi Assumpção	5	4
(Brazil) P Bernardi (Brazil) J Souza	4	4
2	(Brazil) F Neis (Brazil) C Zampieri	6	6

Quarterfinals
1	(El Salvador) M Arévalo (Peru) S Galdós	6	6
(Belgium) A De Greef (Argentina) F Mena	2	2
(Venezuela) LD Martínez (Brazil) F Romboli	1	2
WC	(Colombia) A Gómez (Colombia) C Salamanca	6	6
(Uruguay) A Behar (Ecuador) G Escobar	7	6
(Spain) Í Cervantes (Netherlands) M Vervoort	5	3
(Ecuador) E Gómez (Ecuador) R Quiroz	1	6	[6]
2	(Brazil) F Neis (Brazil) C Zampieri	6	3	[10]

Semifinals
1	(El Salvador) M Arévalo (Peru) S Galdós	7	6
WC	(Colombia) A Gómez (Colombia) C Salamanca	5	3
(Uruguay) A Behar (Ecuador) G Escobar	6	4	[10]
2	(Brazil) F Neis (Brazil) C Zampieri	1	6	[4]

Final
1	(El Salvador) M Arévalo (Peru) S Galdós	6	6
(Uruguay) A Behar (Ecuador) G Escobar	4	1
