= 2021 Open Bogotá – Singles =

Singles
- 2021 Open Bogotá

Final
- Champion: (Austria) Gerald Melzer
- Runner-up: (Argentina) Facundo Mena
- Score: 6–2, 3–6, 7–6^{(7–5)}

Events
Singles	Doubles
- Open Bogotá

Marcelo Arévalo was the defending champion but chose not to defend his title.

Gerald Melzer won the title after defeating Facundo Mena 6–2, 3–6, 7–6^{(7–5)} in the final.

== Seeds ==
1. (Colombia) Daniel Elahi Galán (second round)
2. (Germany) Daniel Altmaier (second round)
3. (Czech Republic) Vít Kopřiva (first round)
4. (Chile) Nicolás Jarry (first round)
5. (Argentina) Facundo Mena (final)
6. (Netherlands) Jesper de Jong (semifinals)
7. (United States) Ulises Blanch (first round)
8. (Tunisia) Malek Jaziri (first round)

== Draw ==
Key

- Q = Qualifier
- WC = Wild card
- LL = Lucky loser
- Alt = Alternate
- ITF = ITF entry
- PR = Protected ranking
- SR = Special ranking
- SE = Special exempt
- JE = Junior exempt
- JR = Junior Accelerator Programme entrant
- CO = College Accelerator Programme entrant
- NG = Next Gen Accelerator Program entrant
- w/o = Walkover
- r = Retired
- d = Defaulted

=== Finals ===
Semifinals
PR	(Austria) Gerald Melzer	6	6^{5}	6
Q	(Colombia) Nicolás Barrientos	2	7^{7}	1
6	(Netherlands) Jesper de Jong	6^{3}	5
5	(Argentina) Facundo Mena	7^{7}	7

Final
PR	(Austria) Gerald Melzer	6	3	7^{7}
5	(Argentina) Facundo Mena	2	6	6^{5}

=== Top half ===
First round
1	(Colombia) DE Galán	4	6	6
(France) Matthieu Perchicot	6	3	4
(Brazil) O Luz	5	2
PR	(Austria) G Melzer	7	6
(Colombia) N Mejía	6	7
(Colombia) C Rodríguez	1	5
(Monaco) L Catarina	6	6
8	(Tunisia) M Jaziri	2	3
4	(Chile) N Jarry	6	5	6^{5}
Q	(France) E Couacaud	3	7	7^{7}
Q	(Colombia) N Barrientos	2	6	6
WC	(Colombia) JS Gómez	6	2	4
(Portugal) G Oliveira	3	6	6
(Serbia) P Krstin	6	3	2
(Spain) O Roca Batalla	6	6
7	(United States) U Blanch	3	2

Second round
1	(Colombia) DE Galán	6^{5}	2
PR	(Austria) G Melzer	7^{7}	6
(Colombia) N Mejía	6	7
(Monaco) L Catarina	4	5
Q	(France) E Couacaud	3	4
Q	(Colombia) N Barrientos	6	6
(Portugal) G Oliveira	3	6	5
(Spain) O Roca Batalla	6	4	7

Quarterfinals
PR	(Austria) G Melzer	6	6
(Colombia) N Mejía	0	4
Q	(Colombia) N Barrientos	6	7
(Spain) O Roca Batalla	3	5

Semifinals
PR	(Austria) G Melzer	6	6^{5}	6
Q	(Colombia) N Barrientos	2	7^{7}	1

=== Bottom half ===
First round
6	(Netherlands) J de Jong	7^{7}	7^{7}
(Spain) P Martín Tiffon	6^{3}	6^{3}
Alt	(Argentina) Matías Zukas	4	6^{4}
(Ecuador) R Quiroz	6	7^{7}
(France) Alexis Gautier	2	1
(Brazil) M Pucinelli de Almeida	6	6
(Colombia) A González	6	7^{7}
3	(Czech Republic) V Kopřiva	2	6^{5}
5	(Argentina) F Mena	6	6
Q	(Switzerland) L Castelnuovo	4	2
WC	(Colombia) A Gómez	6	3	7
Q	(Czech Republic) J Pospíšil	3	6	5
(Canada) A Galarneau	6	6
WC	(Colombia) Enrique Peña	1	1
(Czech Republic) D Svrčina	4	1
2	(Germany) D Altmaier	6	6

Second round
6	(Netherlands) J de Jong	7^{7}	7^{8}
(Ecuador) R Quiroz	6^{5}	6^{6}
(Brazil) M Pucinelli de Almeida	6^{3}	6	6
(Colombia) A González	7^{7}	1	2
5	(Argentina) F Mena	6	6
WC	(Colombia) A Gómez	3	1
(Canada) A Galarneau	6	3	6
2	(Germany) D Altmaier	3	6	3

Quarterfinals
6	(Netherlands) J de Jong	6	7
(Brazil) M Pucinelli de Almeida	2	5
5	(Argentina) F Mena	6	6
(Canada) A Galarneau	1	4

Semifinals
6	(Netherlands) J de Jong	6^{3}	5
5	(Argentina) F Mena	7^{7}	7
