= 2017 Open Bogotá – Singles =

Singles
- 2017 Open Bogotá

Final
- Champion: (El Salvador) Marcelo Arévalo
- Runner-up: (Colombia) Daniel Elahi Galán
- Score: 7–5, 6–4

Events
Singles	Doubles
- Open Bogotá

Facundo Bagnis was the defending champion but chose not to defend his title.

Marcelo Arévalo won the title after defeating Daniel Elahi Galán 7–5, 6–4 in the final.

== Seeds ==
1. (Dominican Republic) Víctor Estrella Burgos (semifinals)
2. (Colombia) Santiago Giraldo (withdrew)
3. (Austria) Sebastian Ofner (first round)
4. (Chile) Nicolás Jarry (first round)
5. (Austria) Gerald Melzer (quarterfinals)
6. (Slovakia) Andrej Martin (quarterfinals)
7. (Brazil) João Souza (second round)
8. (Argentina) Agustín Velotti (semifinals)
9. (Italy) Riccardo Bellotti (second round)

== Draw ==
Key

- Q = Qualifier
- WC = Wild card
- LL = Lucky loser
- Alt = Alternate
- ITF = ITF entry
- PR = Protected ranking
- SR = Special ranking
- SE = Special exempt
- JE = Junior exempt
- JR = Junior Accelerator Programme entrant
- CO = College Accelerator Programme entrant
- NG = Next Gen Accelerator Program entrant
- w/o = Walkover
- r = Retired
- d = Defaulted

=== Finals ===
Semifinals
1	(Dominican Republic) Víctor Estrella Burgos	3	3
(El Salvador) Marcelo Arévalo	6	6
(Colombia) Daniel Elahi Galán	6	6
8	(Argentina) Agustín Velotti	3	2

Final
(El Salvador) Marcelo Arévalo	7	6
(Colombia) Daniel Elahi Galán	5	4

=== Top half ===
First round
1	(Dominican Republic) V Estrella Burgos	6	6
(Colombia) A Falla	2	4
(Argentina) JP Paz	2	0
(Argentina) JP Ficovich	6	6
(Argentina) JI Londero	6	3	6
(Brazil) JP Sorgi	4	6	2
WC	(Bolivia) A Mendoza	2	1
7	(Brazil) J Souza	6	6
4	(Chile) N Jarry	6^{12}	2
(El Salvador) M Arévalo	7^{14}	6
Q	(Ecuador) G Escobar	7^{7}	6
(Austria) M Linzer	6^{3}	3
(Argentina) F Mena	6	7^{9}
Q	(Brazil) P Sakamoto	4	6^{7}
WC	(Colombia) C Salamanca	4	6^{1}
5	(Austria) G Melzer	6	7^{7}

Second round
1	(Dominican Republic) V Estrella Burgos	6	6
(Argentina) JP Ficovich	4	2
(Argentina) JI Londero	6	6
7	(Brazil) J Souza	4	1
(El Salvador) M Arévalo	6	3	6
Q	(Ecuador) G Escobar	1	6	3
(Argentina) F Mena	1	4
5	(Austria) G Melzer	6	6

Quarterfinals
1	(Dominican Republic) V Estrella Burgos	6	6
(Argentina) JI Londero	4	3
(El Salvador) M Arévalo	1	6	6
5	(Austria) G Melzer	6	1	2

Semifinals
1	(Dominican Republic) V Estrella Burgos	3	3
(El Salvador) M Arévalo	6	6

=== Bottom half ===
First round
6	(Slovakia) A Martin	7^{7}	7
(Colombia) A González	6^{2}	5
Q	(Peru) JP Varillas	7	3	7^{8}
WC	(Colombia) Felipe Mantilla	5	6	6^{6}
(Colombia) DE Galán	6	7^{7}
(Croatia) F Škugor	4	6^{1}
(New Zealand) J Statham	7	7
3	(Austria) S Ofner	5	5
8	(Argentina) A Velotti	6	7
(Brazil) B Sant'Anna	3	5
Q	(Peru) M Echazú	3	6^{5}
WC	(Colombia) C Rodríguez	6	7^{7}
LL	(Colombia) JS Gómez	6	6
(Ecuador) R Quiroz	4	3
(Sweden) C Lindell	3	6	4
9	(Italy) R Bellotti	6	3	6

Second round
6	(Slovakia) A Martin	6	6
Q	(Peru) JP Varillas	3	1
(Colombia) DE Galán	6	6
(New Zealand) J Statham	3	3
8	(Argentina) A Velotti	3	6	7^{8}
WC	(Colombia) C Rodríguez	6	2	6^{6}
LL	(Colombia) JS Gómez	6	6
9	(Italy) R Bellotti	4	2

Quarterfinals
6	(Slovakia) A Martin	4	6^{3}
(Colombia) DE Galán	6	7^{7}
8	(Argentina) A Velotti	7	6
LL	(Colombia) JS Gómez	5	4

Semifinals
(Colombia) DE Galán	6	6
8	(Argentina) A Velotti	3	2
