= 2011 Open Seguros Bolívar – Women's doubles =

Women's doubles
- 2011 Open Seguros Bolívar

Final
- Champions: (Venezuela) Andrea Gámiz (Venezuela) Adriana Pérez
- Runners-up: (United States) Julia Cohen (Chile) Andrea Koch-Benvenuto
- Score: 6–3, 6–4

Events
Singles	men	women
Doubles	men	women
← 2010 ·	Open Seguros Bolívar	· 2012 →

Andrea Gámiz and Paula Ormaechea were the defending champions, but Ormaechea chose not to participate. Gámiz partnered up with Adriana Pérez and successfully defended her title, the pair defeating Julia Cohen and Andrea Koch-Benvenuto in the final, 6–3, 6–4.

== Seeds ==
1. (Bolivia) María Fernanda Álvarez Terán / (Brazil) Maria Fernanda Alves (semifinals)
2. (Colombia) Karen Castiblanco / (Colombia) Mariana Duque (semifinals)
3. (United States) Julia Cohen / (Chile) Andrea Koch-Benvenuto (final)
4. (Venezuela) Andrea Gámiz / (Venezuela) Adriana Pérez (champions)

== Draw ==
=== Key ===
- Q = Qualifier
- WC = Wild card
- LL = Lucky loser
- Alt = Alternate
- SE = Special exempt
- PR = Protected ranking
- ITF = ITF entry
- JE = Junior exempt
- w/o = Walkover
- r = Retired
- d = Defaulted
- SR = Special ranking

First round
1	(Bolivia) MF Álvarez Terán (Brazil) MF Alves	6	6
(Colombia) V Núñez Fuentes (Colombia) PC Robles Garcia	3	1
(Argentina) L Sarmenti (Argentina) C Zeballos	6	6
WC	(Colombia) V Gómez (Colombia) PA Puentez Jimenez	2	0
3	(United States) J Cohen (Chile) A Koch-Benvenuto	6	3	[10]
(Brazil) C Forte (Brazil) V Segnini	4	6	[3]
(Argentina) M Cubelli (Argentina) M Irazusta	6^{5}	6	[11]
(Argentina) C Lucero (United States) A Riley	7^{7}	3	[9]
(Bolivia) P Cortes (Colombia) M Gómez	3	4
(Colombia) A Moreno-Kaste (United States) S Vickery	6	6
WC	(United States) V Corning (United States) L Muma	0	1
4	(Venezuela) A Gámiz (Venezuela) A Pérez	6	6
WC	(Colombia) AM Sánchez (Colombia) C Tobar	3	3
(Colombia) A Prisco (Peru) I Várgas Calvo	6	6
(United States) D Mills (Paraguay) I Robbiani	6^{4}	1
2	(Colombia) K Castiblanco (Colombia) M Duque	7^{7}	6

Quarterfinals
1	(Bolivia) MF Álvarez Terán (Brazil) MF Alves	6	6
(Argentina) L Sarmenti (Argentina) C Zeballos	1	0
3	(United States) J Cohen (Chile) A Koch-Benvenuto	6	6
(Argentina) M Cubelli (Argentina) M Irazusta	0	1
(Colombia) A Moreno-Kaste (United States) S Vickery	6	1	[4]
4	(Venezuela) A Gámiz (Venezuela) A Pérez	2	6	[10]
(Colombia) A Prisco (Peru) I Várgas Calvo	0	1
2	(Colombia) K Castiblanco (Colombia) M Duque	6	6

Semifinals
1	(Bolivia) MF Álvarez Terán (Brazil) MF Alves	2	1
3	(United States) J Cohen (Chile) A Koch-Benvenuto	6	6
4	(Venezuela) A Gámiz (Venezuela) A Pérez	6	3	[10]
2	(Colombia) K Castiblanco (Colombia) M Duque	2	6	[8]

Finals
3	(United States) J Cohen (Chile) A Koch-Benvenuto	3	4
4	(Venezuela) A Gámiz (Venezuela) A Pérez	6	6
