= 2025 Open Bogotá – Doubles =

Doubles
- 2025 Open Bogotá

Final
- Champions: (Brazil) Luís Britto (Czech Republic) Zdeněk Kolář
- Runners-up: (Peru) Arklon Huertas del Pino (Peru) Conner Huertas del Pino
- Score: 6–4, 7–6^{(7–4)}

Events
Singles	Doubles
← 2024 ·	Open Bogotá	· 2026 →

Finn Reynolds and Matías Soto were the defending champions but chose not to defend their title.

Luís Britto and Zdeněk Kolář won the title after defeating Arklon and Conner Huertas del Pino 6–4, 7–6^{(7–4)} in the final.

== Seeds ==
1. (Brazil) Mateus Alves / (Zimbabwe) Courtney John Lock (semifinals)
2. (Bolivia) Boris Arias / (Bolivia) Federico Zeballos (quarterfinals)
3. (Brazil) Luís Britto / (Czech Republic) Zdeněk Kolář (champions)
4. (Peru) Arklon Huertas del Pino / (Peru) Conner Huertas del Pino (final)

== Draw ==
=== Key ===
- Q = Qualifier
- WC = Wild card
- LL = Lucky loser
- Alt = Alternate
- ITF = ITF entry
- PR = Protected ranking
- SR = Special ranking
- SE = Special exempt
- JE = Junior exempt
- JR = Junior Accelerator Programme entrant
- CO = College Accelerator Programme entrant
- NG = Next Gen Accelerator Program entrant
- w/o = Walkover
- r = Retired
- d = Defaulted

=== Draw ===
First round
1	(Brazil) M Alves (Zimbabwe) CJ Lock	6	6
WC	(Colombia) Samuel Heredia (Colombia) Juan Sebastián Osorio	1	0
(Argentina) Lorenzo Joaquín Rodríguez (Uruguay) F Roncadelli	6^{4}	6	[10]
(Colombia) JS Gómez (Colombia) Johan Alexander Rodríguez	7^{7}	4	[4]
3	(Brazil) L Britto (Czech Republic) Z Kolář	6	6
Alt	(Brazil) Breno Braga (Brazil) Victor Braga	4	1
(Brazil) M Barreiros Reyes (Brazil) P Sakamoto	4	7^{7}	[10]
(Uruguay) I Carou (Argentina) Ignacio Monzón	6	6^{5}	[5]
(United States) Tristan McCormick (New Zealand) K Pannu	3	1
(Argentina) Leonardo Aboian (Argentina) H Casanova	6	6
PR	(Spain) N Álvarez Varona (Netherlands) M Vervoort	5	4
4	(Peru) A Huertas del Pino (Peru) C Huertas del Pino	7	6
(Argentina) R Olivo (Argentina) Bautista Vilicich	1	2
WC	(Colombia) A Soriano Barrera (Colombia) Miguel Tobón	6	6
(Colombia) N Mejía (Colombia) A Urrea	7^{7}	3	[11]
2	(Bolivia) B Arias (Bolivia) F Zeballos	6^{3}	6	[13]

Quarterfinals
1	(Brazil) M Alves (Zimbabwe) CJ Lock	6	6
(Argentina) LJ Rodríguez (Uruguay) F Roncadelli	0	3
3	(Brazil) L Britto (Czech Republic) Z Kolář	w/o
(Brazil) M Barreiros Reyes (Brazil) P Sakamoto
(Argentina) L Aboian (Argentina) H Casanova	3	1
4	(Peru) A Huertas del Pino (Peru) C Huertas del Pino	6	6
WC	(Colombia) A Soriano Barrera (Colombia) M Tobón	7^{11}	7^{7}
2	(Bolivia) B Arias (Bolivia) F Zeballos	6^{9}	6^{3}

Semifinals
1	(Brazil) M Alves (Zimbabwe) CJ Lock	2	4
3	(Brazil) L Britto (Czech Republic) Z Kolář	6	6
4	(Peru) A Huertas del Pino (Peru) C Huertas del Pino	6^{3}	7^{7}	[10]
WC	(Colombia) A Soriano Barrera (Colombia) M Tobón	7^{7}	6^{4}	[8]

Final
3	(Brazil) L Britto (Czech Republic) Z Kolář	6	7^{7}
4	(Peru) A Huertas del Pino (Peru) C Huertas del Pino	4	6^{4}
