= 2017 Open Bogotá =

- Date: 5–10 September
- Edition: 12th
- Surface: Clay
- Location: Bogotá, Colombia

Champions

Singles
- (El Salvador) Marcelo Arévalo

Doubles
- (El Salvador) Marcelo Arévalo / (Mexico) Miguel Ángel Reyes-Varela
- Open Bogotá

The 2017 Open Bogotá was a professional tennis tournament played on clay courts. It was the twelfth edition of the tournament which was part of the 2017 ATP Challenger Tour. It took place in Bogotá, Colombia between 5 and 10 September 2017.

== Singles main-draw entrants ==
=== Seeds ===
Country	Player	Rank^{1}	Seed
DOM	Víctor Estrella Burgos	90	1
~~COL~~	~~Santiago Giraldo~~	~~129~~	~~2~~
AUT	Sebastian Ofner	132	3
CHI	Nicolás Jarry	133	4
AUT	Gerald Melzer	142	5
SVK	Andrej Martin	183	6
BRA	João Souza	215	7
ARG	Agustín Velotti	250	8
ITA	Riccardo Bellotti	254	9

- ^{1} Rankings are as of 28 August 2017.

=== Other entrants ===
The following players received wildcards into the singles main draw:

- (Colombia) Felipe Mantilla
- (Bolivia) Alejandro Mendoza
- (Colombia) Cristian Rodríguez
- (Colombia) Carlos Salamanca

The following players received entry from the qualifying draw:

- (Peru) Mauricio Echazú
- (Ecuador) Gonzalo Escobar
- (Brazil) Pedro Sakamoto
- (Peru) Juan Pablo Varillas

The following player received entry as a lucky loser:

- (Colombia) Juan Sebastián Gómez

== Champions ==
=== Singles ===
- (El Salvador) Marcelo Arévalo def. (Colombia) Daniel Elahi Galán 7–5, 6–4.

=== Doubles ===
- (El Salvador) Marcelo Arévalo / (Mexico) Miguel Ángel Reyes-Varela def. (Croatia) Nikola Mektić / (Croatia) Franko Škugor 6–3, 3–6, [10–6].
