= 2011 Open Seguros Bolívar – Women's singles =

Women's singles
- 2011 Open Seguros Bolívar

Final
- Champion: (Colombia) Mariana Duque
- Runner-up: (Bolivia) María Fernanda Álvarez Terán
- Score: 7–6^{(8–6)}, 4–6, 6–3

Events
Singles	men	women
Doubles	men	women
← 2010 ·	Open Seguros Bolívar	· 2012 →

Paula Ormaechea was the defending champion, but chose not to participate.

Mariana Duque won the title, defeating María Fernanda Álvarez Terán 7–6^{(8–6)}, 4–6, 6–3 in the final.

== Seeds ==
1. (United States) Julia Cohen (quarterfinals)
2. (Bolivia) María Fernanda Álvarez Terán (final)
3. (Brazil) Vivian Segnini (second round)
4. (Chile) Andrea Koch-Benvenuto (quarterfinals)
5. (Colombia) Mariana Duque (champion)
6. (Venezuela) Andrea Gámiz (semifinals)
7. (Colombia) Karen Castiblanco (quarterfinals)
8. (Venezuela) Adriana Pérez (quarterfinals)

== Main draw ==
=== Key ===
- Q = Qualifier
- WC = Wild card
- LL = Lucky loser
- Alt = Alternate
- SE = Special exempt
- PR = Protected ranking
- ITF = ITF entry
- JE = Junior exempt
- w/o = Walkover
- r = Retired
- d = Defaulted
- SR = Special ranking

=== Finals ===
Semifinals
6	(Venezuela) Andrea Gámiz	3	1
5	(Colombia) Mariana Duque	6	6
(United States) Sachia Vickery	1	5
2	(Bolivia) María Fernanda Álvarez Terán	6	7

Final
5	(Colombia) Mariana Duque	7^{8}	4	6
2	(Bolivia) María Fernanda Álvarez Terán	6^{6}	6	3

=== Top half ===
First round
1	(United States) J Cohen	6	6
(United States) D Mills	3	1
(Paraguay) I Robbiani	6	6
WC	(Colombia) M Gómez	2	0
(Switzerland) S Theiler	1	6^{4}
Q	(Colombia) PC Robles Garcia	6	7^{7}
Q	(Colombia) C Tobar	1	0
6	(Venezuela) A Gámiz	6	6
4	(Chile) A Koch-Benvenuto	6	0	6
(Argentina) C Zeballos	3	6	1
(Colombia) A Moreno-Kaste	1	7	2
WC	(United States) V Corning	6	5	6
WC	(United States) L Muma	6	6
Q	(United Kingdom) R Beddow	2	2
(Argentina) L Sarmenti	1	0
5	(Colombia) M Duque	6	6

Second round
1	(United States) J Cohen	6	6
(Paraguay) I Robbiani	2	2
Q	(Colombia) PC Robles Garcia	0	3
6	(Venezuela) A Gámiz	6	6
4	(Chile) A Koch-Benvenuto	6	6
WC	(United States) V Corning	3	3
WC	(United States) L Muma	1	0
5	(Colombia) M Duque	6	6

Quarterfinals
1	(United States) J Cohen	6	3	0
6	(Venezuela) A Gámiz	4	6	6
4	(Chile) A Koch-Benvenuto	1	1
5	(Colombia) M Duque	6	6

Semifinals
6	(Venezuela) A Gámiz	3	1
5	(Colombia) M Duque	6	6

=== Bottom half ===
First round
7	(Colombia) K Castiblanco	6	6
Q	(Colombia) LS Sánchez Pérez	0	0
Q	(Colombia) D Woodcock	1	3
WC	(Colombia) A Prisco	6	6
(United States) S Vickery	6	6
Q	(United States) A Riley	1	3
(Argentina) C Lucero	4	2
3	(Brazil) V Segnini	6	6
8	(Venezuela) A Pérez	6	6
(Peru) I Várgas Calvo	0	2
(Brazil) MF Alves	6	6
Q	(Bolivia) P Cortes	2	2
LL	(Argentina) M Cubelli	6	6
Q	(Argentina) M Irazusta	2	1
(Brazil) C Forte	5	1
2	(Bolivia) MF Álvarez Terán	7	6

Second round
7	(Colombia) K Castiblanco	6	7
WC	(Colombia) A Prisco	2	5
(United States) S Vickery	6	3	7
3	(Brazil) V Segnini	3	6	5
8	(Venezuela) A Pérez	6	3	6
(Brazil) MF Alves	4	6	1
LL	(Argentina) M Cubelli	1	0
2	(Bolivia) MF Álvarez Terán	6	6

Quarterfinals
7	(Colombia) K Castiblanco	3	6	2
(United States) S Vickery	6	3	6
8	(Venezuela) A Pérez	6	0	3
2	(Bolivia) MF Álvarez Terán	3	6	6

Semifinals
(United States) S Vickery	1	5
2	(Bolivia) MF Álvarez Terán	6	7
