= 2015 Open Bogotá – Doubles =

Doubles
- 2015 Open Bogotá

Final
- Champion: (Chile) Julio Peralta; (Argentina) Horacio Zeballos
- Runner-up: (Colombia) Nicolás Barrientos; (Colombia) Eduardo Struvay
- Score: 6–3, 6–4

Events
Singles	Doubles
- Open Bogotá

Julio Peralta and Horacio Zeballos won the title, beating Nicolás Barrientos and Eduardo Struvay 6–3, 6–4

== Seeds ==
1. (Germany) Gero Kretschmer / (Germany) Alexander Satschko (semifinals, withdraw)
2. (Slovakia) Andrej Martin / (Chile) Hans Podlipnik (semifinals)
3. (Chile) Julio Peralta / (Argentina) Horacio Zeballos (champions)
4. (South Africa) Dean O'Brien / (South Africa) Ruan Roelofse (quarterfinals)

== Draw ==
Key

- Q = Qualifier
- WC = Wild card
- LL = Lucky loser
- Alt = Alternate
- ITF = ITF entry
- PR = Protected ranking
- SR = Special ranking
- SE = Special exempt
- JE = Junior exempt
- JR = Junior Accelerator Programme entrant
- CO = College Accelerator Programme entrant
- NG = Next Gen Accelerator Program entrant
- w/o = Walkover
- r = Retired
- d = Defaulted

=== Draw ===
First round

Quarterfinals

Semifinals

Final

1
- (Germany) G Kretschmer
- (Germany) A Satschko
6
3
[10]

- (Peru) D Beretta
- (Argentina) F Coria
1
6
[3]

1
- (Germany) G Kretschmer
- (Germany) A Satschko
w/o

- (Uruguay) A Behar
- (Philippines) R Gonzales
5
6^{5}

- (Chile) J Aguilar
- (Chile) C Garín

- (Chile) J Aguilar
- (Chile) C Garín
7
7^{7}

1
- (Germany) G Kretschmer
- (Germany) A Satschko

4
- (South Africa) D O'Brien
- (South Africa) R Roelofse
6
4
[10]

- (Colombia) N Barrientos
- (Colombia) E Struvay
w/o

- (Colombia) A González
- (Mexico) M Á Reyes-Varela
3
6
[6]

4
- (South Africa) D O'Brien
- (South Africa) R Roelofse
4
4

- (Colombia) N Barrientos
- (Colombia) E Struvay
3
6
[10]

- (Colombia) N Barrientos
- (Colombia) E Struvay
6
6

- (Brazil) F Romboli
- (Brazil) C Zampieri
6
4
[6]

- (Colombia) N Barrientos
- (Colombia) E Struvay
3
4

WC
- (Italy) Enrico Becuzzi
- (Italy) P Lorenzi
2
4

3
- (Chile) J Peralta
- (Argentina) H Zeballos
6
6

- (El Salvador) M Arévalo
- (Peru) S Galdós
6
6

- (El Salvador) M Arévalo
- (Peru) S Galdós
4
6
[10]

(Brazil) J Pereira
(Brazil) Alexandre Tsuchiya
6^{2}
3

3
- (Chile) J Peralta
- (Argentina) H Zeballos
6
4
[12]

3
- (Chile) J Peralta
- (Argentina) H Zeballos
7^{7}
6

3
- (Chile) J Peralta
- (Argentina) H Zeballos
6
7^{7}

- (Argentina) Juan Ignacio Galarza
- (Argentina) T Lipovšek Puches
6^{3}
6^{4}

2
- (Slovakia) A Martin
- (Chile) H Podlipnik Castillo
3
6^{5}

WC
- (Colombia) DE Galán
- (Colombia) C Rodríguez
7^{7}
7^{7}

WC
- (Colombia) DE Galán
- (Colombia) C Rodríguez
4
3

WC
(Colombia) JS Gómez
(Colombia) Felipe Mantilla
4
6^{3}

2
- (Slovakia) A Martin
- (Chile) H Podlipnik Castillo
6
6

2
- (Slovakia) A Martin
- (Chile) H Podlipnik Castillo
6
7^{7}
