= 2025 Open Bogotá – Singles =

Singles
- 2025 Open Bogotá

Final
- Champion: (United States) Patrick Kypson
- Runner-up: (Brazil) Pedro Sakamoto
- Score: 6–1, 6–3

Events
Singles	Doubles
- Open Bogotá

Facundo Mena was the defending champion but chose not to defend his title.

Patrick Kypson won the title after defeating Pedro Sakamoto 6–1, 6–3 in the final.

== Seeds ==
1. (Colombia) Nicolás Mejía (second round)
2. (Chile) Matías Soto (first round)
3. (Brazil) Karue Sell (first round)
4. (Brazil) Matheus Pucinelli de Almeida (withdrew)
5. (Spain) Nicolás Álvarez Varona (quarterfinals)
6. (Brazil) Mateus Alves (first round)
7. (Brazil) Pedro Sakamoto (final)
8. (Argentina) Renzo Olivo (first round)

== Draw ==
Key

- Q = Qualifier
- WC = Wild card
- LL = Lucky loser
- Alt = Alternate
- ITF = ITF entry
- PR = Protected ranking
- SR = Special ranking
- SE = Special exempt
- JE = Junior exempt
- JR = Junior Accelerator Programme entrant
- CO = College Accelerator Programme entrant
- NG = Next Gen Accelerator Program entrant
- w/o = Walkover
- r = Retired
- d = Defaulted

=== Finals ===
Semifinals
Q	(Brazil) Pedro Rodrigues	6	3	5
7	(Brazil) Pedro Sakamoto	4	6	7
(Argentina) Hernán Casanova	6	6^{4}	5
(United States) Patrick Kypson	3	7^{7}	7

Final
7	(Brazil) Pedro Sakamoto	1	3
(United States) Patrick Kypson	6	6

=== Top half ===
First round
1	(Colombia) N Mejía	6	6
(Dominican Republic) P Bertran	0	1
Q	(Brazil) Pedro Rodrigues	6	7
(Uruguay) F Roncadelli	2	5
(United States) B Kuzuhara	4	2
(Argentina) Lorenzo Joaquín Rodríguez	6	6
Q	(Argentina) Ignacio Monzón	2	1
5	(Spain) N Álvarez Varona	6	6
LL	(United States) Tristan McCormick	2	6	4
(Argentina) Leonardo Aboian	6	4	6
Q	(Colombia) JS Gómez	3	4
Q	(Brazil) M Barreiros Reyes	6	6
(Dominican Republic) R Cid Subervi	6	7^{7}
(New Zealand) K Pannu	2	6^{5}
WC	(Colombia) Salvador Price	3	4
7	(Brazil) P Sakamoto	6	6

Second round
1	(Colombia) N Mejía	6^{7}	7	3
Q	(Brazil) P Rodrigues	7^{9}	5	6
(Argentina) LJ Rodríguez	3	2
5	(Spain) N Álvarez Varona	6	6
(Argentina) L Aboian	4	1
Q	(Brazil) M Barreiros Reyes	6	6
(Dominican Republic) R Cid Subervi	6	4	2
7	(Brazil) P Sakamoto	2	6	6

Quarterfinals
Q	(Brazil) P Rodrigues	6	6
5	(Spain) N Álvarez Varona	4	3
Q	(Brazil) M Barreiros Reyes	6	3	5
7	(Brazil) P Sakamoto	3	6	7

Semifinals
Q	(Brazil) P Rodrigues	6	3	5
7	(Brazil) P Sakamoto	4	6	7

=== Bottom half ===
First round
6	(Brazil) M Alves	6	6^{2}	5
(Argentina) H Casanova	2	7^{7}	7
Q	(Chile) Daniel Antonio Núñez	6	2	6^{3}
WC	(Colombia) Miguel Tobón	3	6	7^{7}
(Colombia) A Soriano Barrera	5	6	6
WC	(Colombia) Samuel Heredia	7	4	0
(Czech Republic) Z Kolář	6	3	6
3	(Brazil) K Sell	3	6	1
8	(Argentina) R Olivo	0	6^{1}
(United States) P Kypson	6	7^{7}
PR	(Peru) A Huertas del Pino	4	7^{7}	6^{6}
Q	(Colombia) Johan Alexander Rodríguez	6	6^{5}	7^{8}
(Brazil) P Boscardin Dias	6	7^{7}
(Argentina) LE Ambrogi	4	6^{3}
(Germany) Elmar Ejupovic	7^{7}	6
2	(Chile) M Soto	6^{3}	4

Second round
(Argentina) H Casanova	6	6
WC	(Colombia) M Tobón	3	1
(Colombia) A Soriano Barrera	3	2
(Czech Republic) Z Kolář	6	6
(United States) P Kypson	6	6
Q	(Colombia) JA Rodríguez	3	4
(Brazil) P Boscardin Dias	3	2
(Germany) E Ejupovic	6	6

Quarterfinals
(Argentina) H Casanova	4	6	6
(Czech Republic) Z Kolář	6	3	1
(United States) P Kypson	7^{8}	7^{8}
(Germany) E Ejupovic	6^{6}	6^{6}

Semifinals
(Argentina) H Casanova	6	6^{4}	5
(United States) P Kypson	3	7^{7}	7
