= 2013 Open Seguros Bolívar – Singles =

Singles
- 2013 Open Seguros Bolívar

Final
- Champion: (Dominican Republic) Víctor Estrella Burgos
- Runner-up: (Brazil) Thomaz Bellucci
- Score: 6–2, 3–0 retired

Events
| Singles | Doubles |
| ← 2012 · | Open Seguros Bolívar | · 2014 → |

Tennis player Alejandro Falla was the 2012 Open Seguros Bolívar defending champion.

He lost in the 2013 semifinals to Thomaz Bellucci. The eventual champion was Víctor Estrella Burgos.

== Seeds ==
1. (Argentina) Horacio Zeballos (second round)
2. (Colombia) Santiago Giraldo (quarterfinals)
3. (Italy) Paolo Lorenzi (quarterfinals)
4. (Argentina) Leonardo Mayer (second round)
5. (Colombia) Alejandro Falla (semifinals)
6. (Argentina) Guido Pella (quarterfinals)
7. (Colombia) Alejandro González (second round)
8. (Argentina) Diego Sebastián Schwartzman (first round)

== Draw ==
=== Key ===
- Q = Qualifier
- WC = Wild card
- LL = Lucky loser
- Alt = Alternate
- SE = Special exempt
- PR = Protected ranking
- ITF = ITF entry
- JE = Junior exempt
- w/o = Walkover
- r = Retired
- d = Defaulted
- SR = Special ranking

=== Finals ===
Semifinals
(Dominican Republic) Víctor Estrella Burgos | 7 | 6
(Brazil) Guilherme Clezar | 5 | 1
(Brazil) Thomaz Bellucci | 6 | 6
5 | (Colombia) Alejandro Falla | 1 | 2

Final
(Dominican Republic) Víctor Estrella Burgos | 6 | 3
(Brazil) Thomaz Bellucci | 2 | 0^{r}

=== Top half ===
First round
1/WC | (Argentina) H Zeballos | 4 | 7^{7} | 7
(Argentina) M Alund | 6 | 6^{5} | 5
(Dominican Republic) V Estrella Burgos | 6 | 6
LL | (Portugal) P Sousa | 0 | 1
WC | (Colombia) C Salamanca | 6^{4} | 1
(Argentina) F Bagnis | 7^{7} | 6
WC | (Colombia) N Barrientos | 6 | 2 | 3
6 | (Argentina) G Pella | 4 | 6 | 6
4 | (Argentina) L Mayer | 7^{7} | 6
(Brazil) A Ghem | 6^{2} | 3
(Chile) P Capdeville | 2 | 2
(Argentina) F Argüello | 6 | 6
Q | (Italy) G Quinzi | 6^{3} | 3
(Argentina) R Olivo | 7^{7} | 6
(Brazil) G Clezar | 6 | 6
8 | (Argentina) DS Schwartzman | 3 | 4

Second round
1/WC | (Argentina) H Zeballos | 4 | 2
(Dominican Republic) V Estrella Burgos | 6 | 6
(Argentina) F Bagnis | 4 | 3
6 | (Argentina) G Pella | 6 | 6
4 | (Argentina) L Mayer | 5 | 6 | 6^{2}
(Argentina) F Argüello | 7 | 3 | 7^{7}
(Argentina) R Olivo | 4 | 4
(Brazil) G Clezar | 6 | 6

Quarterfinals
(Dominican Republic) V Estrella Burgos | 6 | 6
6 | (Argentina) G Pella | 4 | 4
(Argentina) F Argüello | 4 | 4
(Brazil) G Clezar | 6 | 6

Semifinals
(Dominican Republic) V Estrella Burgos | 7 | 6
(Brazil) G Clezar | 5 | 1

=== Bottom half ===
First round
7 | (Colombia) A González | 6 | 6
WC | (Colombia) JS Cabal | 3 | 4
(Brazil) T Bellucci | 6 | 7^{10}
(United States) W Odesnik | 3 | 6^{8}
(Argentina) G Andreozzi | 7^{7} | 4 | 6^{10}
(Ecuador) G Lapentti | 6^{3} | 6 | 7^{12}
(Brazil) J Souza | 3 | 6 | 6^{2}
3 | (Italy) P Lorenzi | 6 | 4 | 7^{7}
5 | (Colombia) A Falla | 7^{7} | 6
(Argentina) A Velotti | 6^{4} | 1
(Portugal) G Elias | 1 | 2
Q | (Germany) Jonas Luetjen | 6 | 6
(Spain) P Riba | 6^{4} | 7^{14} | 4
Q | (Uruguay) A Behar | 7^{7} | 6^{12} | 6
Q | (Argentina) JI Londero | 2 | 6 | 4
2 | (Colombia) S Giraldo | 6 | 4 | 6

Second round
7 | (Colombia) A González | 5 | 1
(Brazil) T Bellucci | 7 | 6
(Ecuador) G Lapentti | 3 | 7^{7} | 2
3 | (Italy) P Lorenzi | 6 | 6^{2} | 6
5 | (Colombia) A Falla | 6 | 6
Q | (Germany) J Luetjen | 2 | 3
Q | (Uruguay) A Behar | 6^{2} | 6 | 1
2 | (Colombia) S Giraldo | 7^{7} | 3 | 6

Quarterfinals
(Brazil) T Bellucci | 6 | 6^{7} | 7^{7}
3 | (Italy) P Lorenzi | 4 | 7^{9} | 6^{4}
5 | (Colombia) A Falla | 6 | 3 | 6
2 | (Colombia) S Giraldo | 4 | 6 | 3

Semifinals
(Brazil) T Bellucci | 6 | 6
5 | (Colombia) A Falla | 1 | 2
