= 2024 Open Bogotá – Doubles =

Doubles
- 2024 Open Bogotá

Final
- Champions: (New Zealand) Finn Reynolds (Chile) Matías Soto
- Runners-up: (Zimbabwe) Benjamin Lock (Brazil) João Lucas Reis da Silva
- Score: 6–3, 6–4

Events
| Singles | Doubles |
| ← 2023 · | Open Bogotá | · 2025 → |

Renzo Olivo and Thiago Agustín Tirante were the defending champions but only Olivo chose to defend his title, partnering Pedro Sakamoto. They lost in the first round to Garrett Johns and Noah Schachter.

Finn Reynolds and Matías Soto won the title after defeating Benjamin Lock and João Lucas Reis da Silva 6–3, 6–4 in the final.

== Seeds ==
1. (Bolivia) Boris Arias / (Bolivia) Federico Zeballos (first round)
2. (New Zealand) Finn Reynolds / (Chile) Matías Soto (champions)
3. (Brazil) Mateus Alves / (Brazil) Pedro Boscardin Dias (quarterfinals)
4. (Zimbabwe) Benjamin Lock / (Brazil) João Lucas Reis da Silva (final)

== Draw ==
Key

- Q = Qualifier
- WC = Wild card
- LL = Lucky loser
- Alt = Alternate
- ITF = ITF entry
- PR = Protected ranking
- SR = Special ranking
- SE = Special exempt
- JE = Junior exempt
- JR = Junior Accelerator Programme entrant
- CO = College Accelerator Programme entrant
- NG = Next Gen Accelerator Program entrant
- w/o = Walkover
- r = Retired
- d = Defaulted

=== Draw ===
First round
1 | (Bolivia) B Arias (Bolivia) F Zeballos | 5 | 7^{7} | [4]
(Argentina) Tomás Farjat (Peru) C Huertas del Pino | 7 | 6^{2} | [10]
(United Kingdom) J Clarke (Kazakhstan) D Popko | 4 | 4
(Colombia) N Mejía (Colombia) A Urrea | 6 | 6
4 | (Zimbabwe) B Lock (Brazil) JL Reis da Silva | 6 | 6
(United States) C Kingsley (Antigua and Barbuda) J Maginley | 3 | 2
(Argentina) R Olivo (Brazil) P Sakamoto | 4 | 7 | [5]
(United States) G Johns (United States) N Schachter | 6 | 5 | [10]
(Argentina) JP Ficovich (Mexico) R Pacheco Méndez | 7^{7} | 2 | [10]
(New Zealand) K Pannu (Australia) K Pearson | 6^{4} | 6 | [4]
WC | (Colombia) JS Gómez (Colombia) Johan Alexander Rodríguez | 4 | 4
3 | (Brazil) M Alves (Brazil) P Boscardin Dias | 6 | 6
(United States) Harrison Adams (Brazil) K Sell | 7^{7} | 6^{3} | [10]
(Canada) JC Aguilar (United States) T Hilderbrand | 6^{4} | 7^{7} | [8]
WC | (Colombia) Alejandro Arcila (Colombia) Miguel Tobón | 6^{3} | 4
2 | (New Zealand) F Reynolds (Chile) M Soto | 7^{7} | 6

Quarterfinals
(Argentina) T Farjat (Peru) C Huertas del Pino | 2 | 2
(Colombia) N Mejía (Colombia) A Urrea | 6 | 6
4 | (Zimbabwe) B Lock (Brazil) JL Reis da Silva | 4 | 6 | [10]
(United States) G Johns (United States) N Schachter | 6 | 3 | [2]
(Argentina) JP Ficovich (Mexico) R Pacheco Méndez | 6 | 6
3 | (Brazil) M Alves (Brazil) P Boscardin Dias | 3 | 4
(United States) H Adams (Brazil) K Sell | 2 | 6^{3}
2 | (New Zealand) F Reynolds (Chile) M Soto | 6 | 7^{7}

Semifinals
(Colombia) N Mejía (Colombia) A Urrea | 3 | 6^{4}
4 | (Zimbabwe) B Lock (Brazil) JL Reis da Silva | 6 | 7^{7}
(Argentina) JP Ficovich (Mexico) R Pacheco Méndez | 3 | 4
2 | (New Zealand) F Reynolds (Chile) M Soto | 6 | 6

Final
4 | (Zimbabwe) B Lock (Brazil) JL Reis da Silva | 3 | 4
2 | (New Zealand) F Reynolds (Chile) M Soto | 6 | 6
