= 2024 Open Bogotá =

- Date: 5 – 11 August
- Edition: 16th
- Surface: Clay
- Location: Bogotá, Colombia
- Venue: Carmel Club Bogotá

Champions

Singles
- (Argentina) Facundo Mena

Doubles
- (New Zealand) Finn Reynolds / (Chile) Matías Soto
- Open Bogotá

The 2024 Open Bogotá was a professional tennis tournament played on clay courts. It was the 16th edition of the tournament which was part of the 2024 ATP Challenger Tour. It took place in Bogotá, Colombia between 5 and 11 August 2024.

== Singles main-draw entrants ==
=== Seeds ===
Country	Player	Rank^{1}	Seed
ARG	Thiago Agustín Tirante	97	1
ARG	Facundo Bagnis	132	2
KAZ	Dmitry Popko	185	3
ECU	Álvaro Guillén Meza	225	4
AUS	Bernard Tomic	238	5
ARG	Facundo Mena	244	6
COL	Nicolás Mejía	260	7
ARG	Juan Pablo Ficovich	273	8

- ^{1} Rankings are as of 29 July 2024.

=== Other entrants ===
The following players received wildcards into the singles main draw:

- (Colombia) Salvador Price
- (Colombia) Johan Alexander Rodríguez
- (Colombia) Miguel Tobón

The following players received entry into the singles main draw as alternates:

- (Brazil) Pedro Boscardin Dias
- (Argentina) Guido Iván Justo

The following players received entry from the qualifying draw:

- (Colombia) Alejandro Arcila
- (Brazil) Mateo Barreiros Reyes
- (Colombia) Mateo Castañeda
- (Italy) Lorenzo Claverie
- (Argentina) Tomás Farjat
- (United States) Tristan McCormick

== Champions ==
=== Singles ===
- (Argentina) Facundo Mena def. (Brazil) Mateus Alves 6–4, 7–5.

=== Doubles ===
- (New Zealand) Finn Reynolds / (Chile) Matías Soto def. (Zimbabwe) Benjamin Lock / (Brazil) João Lucas Reis da Silva 6–3, 6–4.
