= 2016 Open Bogotá =

- Date: 7–13 November
- Edition: 11th
- Surface: Clay
- Location: Bogotá, Colombia

Champions

Singles
- (Argentina) Facundo Bagnis

Doubles
- (El Salvador) Marcelo Arévalo / (Peru) Sergio Galdós
- Open Bogotá

The 2016 Open Bogotá was a professional tennis tournament played on clay courts. It was the eleventh edition of the tournament which was part of the 2016 ATP Challenger Tour. It took place in Bogotá, Colombia between 7 and 13 November 2016.

== Singles main-draw entrants ==
=== Seeds ===
Country	Player	Rank^{1}	Seed
ARG	Facundo Bagnis	68	1
ARG	Horacio Zeballos	78	2
ESP	Íñigo Cervantes	82	3
COL	Santiago Giraldo	98	4
DOM	Víctor Estrella Burgos	103	5
BRA	João Souza	122	6
BEL	Arthur De Greef	151	7
ARG	Agustín Velotti	178	8

- ^{1} Rankings are as of October 31, 2016.

=== Other entrants ===
The following players received wildcards into the singles main draw:

- (Colombia) Daniel Elahi Galán
- (United States) Andrew Ely
- (Brazil) Lucas Koelle
- (Colombia) Carlos Salamanca

The following players received entry into the singles main draw with a protected ranking:

- (Brazil) Fabiano de Paula

The following player entered the main draw as an alternate:

- (Argentina) Facundo Mena

The following players received entry from the qualifying draw:

- (Chile) Marcelo Tomás Barrios Vera
- (Ecuador) Gonzalo Escobar
- (Chile) Nicolás Jarry
- (Brazil) Fernando Romboli

The following player received entry as a lucky loser:

- (Colombia) Alejandro Gómez

== Champions ==
=== Men's singles ===
- (Argentina) Facundo Bagnis def. (Argentina) Horacio Zeballos 3–6, 6–3, 7–6^{(7-4)}

=== Men's doubles ===
- (El Salvador) Marcelo Arévalo / (Peru) Sergio Galdós def. (Uruguay) Ariel Behar / (Ecuador) Gonzalo Escobar 6–4, 6–1
