= 2021 Open Bogotá – Doubles =

Doubles
- 2021 Open Bogotá

Final
- Champions: (Chile) Nicolás Jarry (Ecuador) Roberto Quiroz
- Runners-up: (Colombia) Nicolás Barrientos (Colombia) Alejandro Gómez
- Score: 6–7^{(4–7)}, 7–5, [10–4]

Events
Singles	Doubles
- Open Bogotá

Marcelo Arévalo and Miguel Ángel Reyes-Varela were the defending champions but chose not to defend their title.

Nicolás Jarry and Roberto Quiroz won the title after defeating Nicolás Barrientos and Alejandro Gómez 6–7^{(4–7)}, 7–5, [10–4] in the final.

== Seeds ==
1. (Brazil) Orlando Luz / (Venezuela) Luis David Martínez (quarterfinals)
2. (Philippines) Ruben Gonzales / (United States) Evan King (first round)
3. (Peru) Sergio Galdós / (Argentina) Facundo Mena (quarterfinals)
4. (Colombia) Nicolás Barrientos / (Colombia) Alejandro Gómez (final)

== Draw ==
Key

- Q = Qualifier
- WC = Wild card
- LL = Lucky loser
- Alt = Alternate
- ITF = ITF entry
- PR = Protected ranking
- SR = Special ranking
- SE = Special exempt
- JE = Junior exempt
- JR = Junior Accelerator Programme entrant
- CO = College Accelerator Programme entrant
- NG = Next Gen Accelerator Program entrant
- w/o = Walkover
- r = Retired
- d = Defaulted

First round
1	(Brazil) O Luz (Venezuela) LD Martínez	6	6
WC	(Colombia) JS Gómez (Colombia) A González	3	2
WC	(Colombia) Enrique Peña (Colombia) Johan Rodríguez	1	2
(Chile) N Jarry (Ecuador) R Quiroz	6	6
3	(Peru) S Galdós (Argentina) F Mena	6	6
Alt	(France) Matthieu Perchicot (France) Paul Valsecchi	0	3
(Ecuador) D Hidalgo (Colombia) C Rodríguez	7	6
(Portugal) G Oliveira (Mexico) L Patiño	5	3
(Switzerland) L Castelnuovo (France) E Couacaud	7^{7}	6
(Bolivia) B Arias (Spain) O Roca Batalla	6^{4}	1
(Colombia) N Mejía (Brazil) M Pucinelli de Almeida	1	2
4	(Colombia) N Barrientos (Colombia) A Gómez	6	6
(Czech Republic) V Kopřiva (Peru) A Merino	7	6
WC	(Colombia) Mateo Gómez (Colombia) Alejandro Hoyos	5	3
(Netherlands) J de Jong (Netherlands) B Stevens	6	1	[10]
2	(Philippines) R Gonzales (United States) E King	1	6	[6]

Quarterfinals
1	(Brazil) O Luz (Venezuela) LD Martínez	6^{2}	1
(Chile) N Jarry (Ecuador) R Quiroz	7^{7}	6
3	(Peru) S Galdós (Argentina) F Mena	4	4
(Ecuador) D Hidalgo (Colombia) C Rodríguez	6	6
(Switzerland) L Castelnuovo (France) E Couacaud	2	0^{r}
4	(Colombia) N Barrientos (Colombia) A Gómez	6	1
(Czech Republic) V Kopřiva (Peru) A Merino	2	4
(Netherlands) J de Jong (Netherlands) B Stevens	6	6

Semifinals
(Chile) N Jarry (Ecuador) R Quiroz	7	7^{7}
(Ecuador) D Hidalgo (Colombia) C Rodríguez	5	6^{5}
4	(Colombia) N Barrientos (Colombia) A Gómez	5	7^{7}	[10]
(Netherlands) J de Jong (Netherlands) B Stevens	7	6^{4}	[8]

Final
(Chile) N Jarry (Ecuador) R Quiroz	6^{4}	7	[10]
4	(Colombia) N Barrientos (Colombia) A Gómez	7^{7}	5	[4]
