= 2024 Open Bogotá – Singles =

Singles
- 2024 Open Bogotá

Final
- Champion: (Argentina) Facundo Mena
- Runner-up: (Brazil) Mateus Alves
- Score: 6–4, 7–5

Events
Singles	Doubles
- Open Bogotá

Thiago Agustín Tirante was the defending champion but lost in the first round to Benjamin Lock.

Facundo Mena won the title after defeating Mateus Alves 6–4, 7–5 in the final.

== Seeds ==
1. (Argentina) Thiago Agustín Tirante (first round)
2. (Argentina) Facundo Bagnis (quarterfinals)
3. (Kazakhstan) Dmitry Popko (quarterfinals)
4. (Ecuador) Álvaro Guillén Meza (second round)
5. (Australia) Bernard Tomic (quarterfinals)
6. (Argentina) Facundo Mena (champion)
7. (Colombia) Nicolás Mejía (semifinals)
8. (Argentina) Juan Pablo Ficovich (quarterfinals)

== Draw ==
Key

- Q = Qualifier
- WC = Wild card
- LL = Lucky loser
- Alt = Alternate
- ITF = ITF entry
- PR = Protected ranking
- SR = Special ranking
- SE = Special exempt
- JE = Junior exempt
- JR = Junior Accelerator Programme entrant
- CO = College Accelerator Programme entrant
- NG = Next Gen Accelerator Program entrant
- w/o = Walkover
- r = Retired
- d = Defaulted

=== Finals ===
Semifinals
(Brazil) Mateus Alves	6	6
7	(Colombia) Nicolás Mejía	3	2
(Brazil) Karue Sell	4	7^{7}	0
6	(Argentina) Facundo Mena	6	6^{5}	6

Final
(Brazil) Mateus Alves	4	5
6	(Argentina) Facundo Mena	6	7

=== Top half ===
First round
1	(Argentina) TA Tirante	3	6^{2}
(Zimbabwe) B Lock	6	7^{7}
Q	(Italy) Lorenzo Claverie	3	3
(Brazil) M Alves	6	6
(Mexico) R Pacheco Méndez	7	7^{7}
WC	(Colombia) Miguel Tobón	5	6^{3}
Alt	(Brazil) P Boscardin Dias	6	4	4
5	(Australia) B Tomic	0	6	6
3	(Kazakhstan) D Popko	7	4	6
(United States) Harrison Adams	5	6	3
(Brazil) JL Reis da Silva	4	1
(United Kingdom) J Clarke	6	6
WC	(Colombia) Salvador Price	1	4
WC	(Colombia) Johan Alexander Rodríguez	6	6
Q	(United States) Tristan McCormick	3	4
7	(Colombia) N Mejía	6	6

Second round
(Zimbabwe) B Lock	3	4
(Brazil) M Alves	6	6
(Mexico) R Pacheco Méndez	6^{5}	7^{7}	6^{5}
5	(Australia) B Tomic	7^{7}	6^{5}	7^{7}
3	(Kazakhstan) D Popko	6	6
(United Kingdom) J Clarke	2	4
WC	(Colombia) JA Rodríguez	6^{6}	1
7	(Colombia) N Mejía	7^{8}	6

Quarterfinals
(Brazil) M Alves	3	6	7^{7}
5	(Australia) B Tomic	6	2	6^{4}
3	(Kazakhstan) D Popko	6	6^{4}	2
7	(Colombia) N Mejía	0	7^{7}	6

Semifinals
(Brazil) M Alves	6	6
7	(Colombia) N Mejía	3	2

=== Bottom half ===
First round
8	(Argentina) JP Ficovich	7^{7}	7^{7}
(Chile) M Soto	6^{5}	6^{3}
(United States) G Johns	5	3
(United States) C Kingsley	7	6
Q	(Brazil) M Barreiros Reyes	6^{2}	1
(Brazil) K Sell	7^{7}	6
Q	(Colombia) Alejandro Arcila	6^{5}	4
4	(Ecuador) Á Guillén Meza	7^{7}	6
6	(Argentina) F Mena	6	6
Alt	(Argentina) GI Justo	0	4
Q	(Colombia) Mateo Castañeda	1	4
Q	(Argentina) Tomás Farjat	6	6
(Brazil) P Sakamoto	6	6
(Argentina) R Olivo	4	4
(New Zealand) K Pannu	4	4
2	(Argentina) F Bagnis	6	6

Second round
8	(Argentina) JP Ficovich	6	7^{7}
(United States) C Kingsley	3	6^{4}
(Brazil) K Sell	6	6
4	(Ecuador) Á Guillén Meza	3	4
6	(Argentina) F Mena	6	3	7^{7}
Q	(Argentina) T Farjat	4	6	6^{3}
(Brazil) P Sakamoto	4	2
2	(Argentina) F Bagnis	6	6

Quarterfinals
8	(Argentina) JP Ficovich	4	0
(Brazil) K Sell	6	6
6	(Argentina) F Mena	5	6	6
2	(Argentina) F Bagnis	7	3	2

Semifinals
(Brazil) K Sell	4	7^{7}	0
6	(Argentina) F Mena	6	6^{5}	6
