= 2016 Open Bogotá – Singles =

Singles
- 2016 Open Bogotá

Final
- Champion: (Argentina) Facundo Bagnis
- Runner-up: (Argentina) Horacio Zeballos
- Score: 3–6, 6–3, 7–6^{(7–4)}

Events
| Singles | Doubles |
- Open Bogotá

Eduardo Struvay was the defending champion but lost in the second round to Facundo Bagnis.

Bagnis won the title after defeating Horacio Zeballos 3–6, 6–3, 7–6^{(7–4)} in the final.

== Seeds ==
1. (Argentina) Facundo Bagnis (champion)
2. (Argentina) Horacio Zeballos (final)
3. (Spain) Íñigo Cervantes (semifinals)
4. (Colombia) Santiago Giraldo (semifinals)
5. (Dominican Republic) Víctor Estrella Burgos (second round)
6. (Brazil) João Souza (second round)
7. (Belgium) Arthur De Greef (second round, retired)
8. (Argentina) Agustín Velotti (second round, retired)

== Draw ==
Key

- Q = Qualifier
- WC = Wild card
- LL = Lucky loser
- Alt = Alternate
- ITF = ITF entry
- PR = Protected ranking
- SR = Special ranking
- SE = Special exempt
- JE = Junior exempt
- JR = Junior Accelerator Programme entrant
- CO = College Accelerator Programme entrant
- NG = Next Gen Accelerator Program entrant
- w/o = Walkover
- r = Retired
- d = Defaulted

=== Finals ===
Semifinals
1 | (Argentina) Facundo Bagnis | 6 | 7^{7}
3 | (Spain) Íñigo Cervantes | 1 | 6^{3}
4 | (Colombia) Santiago Giraldo | 7 | 5 | 4
2 | (Argentina) Horacio Zeballos | 5 | 7 | 6

Final
1 | (Argentina) Facundo Bagnis | 3 | 6 | 7^{7}
2 | (Argentina) Horacio Zeballos | 6 | 3 | 6^{4}

=== Top half ===
First round
1 | (Argentina) F Bagnis | 6 | 6
(United States) A El Mihdawy | 3 | 2
(Colombia) E Struvay | 6 | 6
(Russia) I Nedelko | 4 | 2
(Argentina) JI Londero | 3 | 6 | 6^{7}
LL | (Colombia) A Gómez | 6 | 3 | 7^{9}
(Ecuador) R Quiroz | 6^{2} | 7^{7} | 1
7 | (Belgium) A De Greef | 7^{7} | 6^{3} | 6
3 | (Spain) Í Cervantes | 6 | 6
(Colombia) A Falla | 4 | 1
WC | (Brazil) Lucas Koelle | 6 | 5 | 3
Q | (Brazil) F Romboli | 3 | 7 | 6
WC | (Colombia) DE Galán | 4 | 6 | 6
(Austria) M Linzer | 6 | 3 | 1
(Poland) K Majchrzak | 4 | 6 | 3
8 | (Argentina) A Velotti | 6 | 4 | 6

Second round
1 | (Argentina) F Bagnis | 5 | 6 | 6
(Colombia) E Struvay | 7 | 2 | 3
LL | (Colombia) A Gómez | 6 | 4
7 | (Belgium) A De Greef | 4 | 1^{r}
3 | (Spain) Í Cervantes | 6 | 7^{7}
Q | (Brazil) F Romboli | 3 | 6^{4}
WC | (Colombia) DE Galán | 6^{5} | 7 | 4
8 | (Argentina) A Velotti | 7^{7} | 5 | 1^{r}

Quarterfinals
1 | (Argentina) F Bagnis | 7^{7} | 6
LL | (Colombia) A Gómez | 6^{4} | 3
3 | (Spain) Í Cervantes | 6 | 6
WC | (Colombia) DE Galán | 3 | 4

Semifinals
1 | (Argentina) F Bagnis | 6 | 7^{7}
3 | (Spain) Í Cervantes | 1 | 6^{3}

=== Bottom half ===
First round
6 | (Brazil) J Souza | 6 | 6
WC | (United States) Andrew Ely | 0 | 3
PR | (Brazil) F de Paula | 4 | 6^{0}
(Brazil) A Ghem | 6 | 7^{7}
Q | (Chile) N Jarry | 3 | 6 | 6^{3}
(Brazil) C Zampieri | 6 | 4 | 7^{7}
Alt | (Argentina) F Mena | 2 | 0
4 | (Colombia) S Giraldo | 6 | 6
5 | (Dominican Republic) V Estrella Burgos | 3 | 6 | 6
(Ecuador) E Gómez | 6 | 3 | 3
(El Salvador) M Arévalo | 6 | 7^{7}
WC | (Colombia) C Salamanca | 4 | 6^{4}
Q | (Ecuador) G Escobar | 7 | 6
Q | (Chile) MT Barrios Vera | 5 | 4
(France) M Janvier | 4 | 4
2 | (Argentina) H Zeballos | 6 | 6

Second round
6 | (Brazil) J Souza | 3 | 6 | 6^{2}
(Brazil) A Ghem | 6 | 2 | 7^{7}
(Brazil) C Zampieri | 5 | 3
4 | (Colombia) S Giraldo | 7 | 6
5 | (Dominican Republic) V Estrella Burgos | 3 | 4
(El Salvador) M Arévalo | 6 | 6
Q | (Ecuador) G Escobar | 6^{6} | 6 | 1
2 | (Argentina) H Zeballos | 7^{8} | 3 | 6

Quarterfinals
(Brazil) A Ghem | 6^{5} | 2
4 | (Colombia) S Giraldo | 7^{7} | 6
(El Salvador) M Arévalo | 2 | 6^{4}
2 | (Argentina) H Zeballos | 6 | 7^{7}

Semifinals
4 | (Colombia) S Giraldo | 7 | 5 | 4
2 | (Argentina) H Zeballos | 5 | 7 | 6
