= 2013 Open Seguros Bolívar – Doubles =

Doubles
- 2013 Open Seguros Bolívar

Final
- Champions: (Colombia) Juan Sebastián Cabal (Colombia) Alejandro González
- Runners-up: (Colombia) Nicolás Barrientos (Colombia) Eduardo Struvay
- Score: 6–3, 6–2

Events
Singles	Doubles
- Open Seguros Bolívar

Marcelo Demoliner and Víctor Estrella Burgos were the defending champions but decided not to participate together.
Demoliner partnered with André Sá and lost to Facundo Argüello and Renzo Olivo in the first round.
Estrella Burgos partnered with Guido Andreozzi but lost to Carlos Salamanca and Juan-Carlos Spir in the first round.
Juan Sebastián Cabal and Alejandro González won the title over wildcard compatriots Nicolás Barrientos and Eduardo Struvay.

== Seeds ==
1. (Brazil) Marcelo Demoliner / (Brazil) André Sá (first round)
2. (Uruguay) Ariel Behar / (Argentina) Horacio Zeballos (semifinals)
3. (Italy) Paolo Lorenzi / (Italy) Alessandro Motti (first round)
4. (Colombia) Juan Sebastián Cabal / (Colombia) Alejandro González (champions)

== Draw ==
Key

- Q = Qualifier
- WC = Wild card
- LL = Lucky loser
- Alt = Alternate
- ITF = ITF entry
- PR = Protected ranking
- SR = Special ranking
- SE = Special exempt
- JE = Junior exempt
- JR = Junior Accelerator Programme entrant
- CO = College Accelerator Programme entrant
- NG = Next Gen Accelerator Program entrant
- w/o = Walkover
- r = Retired
- d = Defaulted

=== Draw ===
First round
1	(Brazil) M Demoliner (Brazil) A Sá	3	6	[8]
(Argentina) F Argüello (Argentina) R Olivo	6	1	[10]
WC	(Colombia) C Salamanca (Colombia) J-C Spir	6	6
(Argentina) G Andreozzi (Dominican Republic) V Estrella Burgos	1	1
3	(Italy) P Lorenzi (Italy) A Motti	5	6	[13]
(Brazil) A Ghem (Brazil) J Souza	7	0	[15]
WC	(Colombia) N Barrientos (Colombia) E Struvay	7^{7}	6
(Argentina) L Mayer (Argentina) A Velotti	6^{4}	3
(Argentina) G Durán (Argentina) DS Schwartzman	7^{7}	6
PR	(Chile) P Capdeville (Ecuador) G Lapentti	6^{1}	2
(Moldova) R Borvanov (Germany) A Satschko	4	6^{14}
4	(Colombia) JS Cabal (Colombia) A González	6	7^{16}
(United States) V Mirzadeh (United States) W Odesnik	4	2
(Peru) S Galdós (Argentina) G Pella	6	6
WC	(Colombia) Felipe Mantilla (Venezuela) D Souto	2	2
2	(Uruguay) A Behar (Argentina) H Zeballos	6	6

Quarterfinals
(Argentina) F Argüello (Argentina) R Olivo	6	6
WC	(Colombia) C Salamanca (Colombia) J-C Spir	4	4
(Brazil) A Ghem (Brazil) J Souza	6^{3}	1
WC	(Colombia) N Barrientos (Colombia) E Struvay	7^{7}	6
(Argentina) G Durán (Argentina) DS Schwartzman	2	3
4	(Colombia) JS Cabal (Colombia) A González	6	6
(Peru) S Galdós (Argentina) G Pella	6^{2}	7^{9}	[8]
2	(Uruguay) A Behar (Argentina) H Zeballos	7^{7}	7^{7}	[10]

Semifinals
(Argentina) F Argüello (Argentina) R Olivo	6^{5}	6	[8]
WC	(Colombia) N Barrientos (Colombia) E Struvay	7^{7}	4	[10]
4	(Colombia) JS Cabal (Colombia) A González	7^{7}	6^{6}	[10]
2	(Uruguay) A Behar (Argentina) H Zeballos	6^{3}	7^{8}	[5]

Final
WC	(Colombia) N Barrientos (Colombia) E Struvay	3	2
4	(Colombia) JS Cabal (Colombia) A González	6	6
