= 2022 Open Bogotá – Doubles =

Doubles
- 2022 Open Bogotá

Final
- Champions: (Colombia) Nicolás Mejía (Colombia) Andrés Urrea
- Runners-up: (Argentina) Ignacio Monzón (Argentina) Gonzalo Villanueva
- Score: 6–3, 6–4

Events
Singles	Doubles
- Open Bogotá

Nicolás Jarry and Roberto Quiroz were the defending champions but chose not to defend their title.

Nicolás Mejía and Andrés Urrea won the title after defeating Ignacio Monzón and Gonzalo Villanueva 6–3, 6–4 in the final.

== Seeds ==
1. (India) Sriram Balaji / (India) Jeevan Nedunchezhiyan (quarterfinals)
2. (Norway) Viktor Durasovic / (Portugal) Gonçalo Oliveira (first round)
3. (Brazil) Mateus Alves / (Argentina) Matías Zukas (semifinals)
4. (Argentina) Román Andrés Burruchaga / (Argentina) Francisco Comesaña (withdrew)
5. (Uruguay) Ignacio Carou / (Argentina) Facundo Mena (quarterfinals)

== Draw ==
Key

- Q = Qualifier
- WC = Wild card
- LL = Lucky loser
- Alt = Alternate
- ITF = ITF entry
- PR = Protected ranking
- SR = Special ranking
- SE = Special exempt
- JE = Junior exempt
- JR = Junior Accelerator Programme entrant
- CO = College Accelerator Programme entrant
- NG = Next Gen Accelerator Program entrant
- w/o = Walkover
- r = Retired
- d = Defaulted

First round
1	(India) S Balaji (India) J Nedunchezhiyan	7	6^{5}	[11]
(United States) N Chappell (Tunisia) M Jaziri	5	7^{7}	[9]
(Colombia) N Mejía (Colombia) A Urrea	6	7^{7}
(Greece) M Pervolarakis (United States) E Zhu	3	6^{3}
(Japan) Kosuke Ogura (New Zealand) K Pannu	6^{6}	6^{7}
(Peru) A Huertas del Pino (Argentina) Facundo Juárez	7^{8}	7^{9}
(Argentina) Ignacio Monzón (Argentina) G Villanueva	6	6
WC	(Colombia) Sergio Luis Hernández Ramírez (Colombia) Juan Sebastián Osorio	4	2
(Serbia) P Krstin (Serbia) M Zekić
5	(Uruguay) I Carou (Argentina) F Mena	w/o
(Bolivia) A Mendoza (Brazil) Fernando Yamacita	7	6^{5}	[10]
(Chinese Taipei) Chen Kuan-yu (Haiti) H Rousseau	5	7^{7}	[5]
(Argentina) Tobías Franco (Brazil) Gabriel Tumasonis	5	6	[13]
2	(Norway) V Durasovic (Portugal) G Oliveira	7	4	[11]

Quarterfinals
1	(India) S Balaji (India) J Nedunchezhiyan	7^{7}	3	[6]
(Colombia) N Mejía (Colombia) A Urrea	6^{2}	6	[10]
3	(Brazil) M Alves (Argentina) Matías Zukas	7^{7}	6
(Peru) A Huertas del Pino (Argentina) F Juárez	6^{2}	3
(Argentina) I Monzón (Argentina) G Villanueva	6	7^{8}
5	(Uruguay) I Carou (Argentina) F Mena	2	6^{6}
(Bolivia) A Mendoza (Brazil) F Yamacita	3	6^{5}
(Argentina) T Franco (Brazil) G Tumasonis	6	7^{7}

Semifinals
(Colombia) N Mejía (Colombia) A Urrea	6	6
3	(Brazil) M Alves (Argentina) M Zukas	4	3
(Argentina) I Monzón (Argentina) G Villanueva	6	6
(Argentina) T Franco (Brazil) G Tumasonis	4	2

Final
(Colombia) N Mejía (Colombia) A Urrea	6	6
(Argentina) I Monzón (Argentina) G Villanueva	3	4
