= 2015 Open Bogotá =

- Date: 2–8 November
- Edition: 10th
- Surface: Clay
- Location: Bogotá, Colombia

Champions

Singles
- (Colombia) Eduardo Struvay

Doubles
- (Chile) Julio Peralta / (Argentina) Horacio Zeballos
← 2013 ·	Open Bogotá	· 2016 →

The 2015 Open Bogotá was a professional tennis tournament played on clay courts. It was the tenth edition of the tournament which was part of the 2015 ATP Challenger Tour. It took place in Bogotá, Colombia between 2 and 8 November 2015.

== Singles main-draw entrants ==
=== Seeds ===
Country	Player	Rank^{1}	Seed
DOM	Víctor Estrella Burgos	65	1
ITA	Paolo Lorenzi	72	2
COL	Alejandro Falla	122	3
ARG	Horacio Zeballos	136	4
COL	Alejandro González	141	5
BRA	João Souza	144	6
SVK	Andrej Martin	161	7
CHI	Hans Podlipnik Castillo	173	8

- ^{1} Rankings are as of October 26, 2015.

=== Other entrants ===
The following players received wildcards into the singles main draw:

- (Colombia) Daniel Elahi Galán
- (Dominican Republic) José Olivares
- (Japan) Riki Oshima
- (Colombia) Cristian Rodríguez

The following player entered the main draw as an alternate:

- (Chile) Guillermo Rivera Aránguiz

The following players received entry from the qualifying draw:

- (Germany) Gero Kretschmer
- (Colombia) Felipe Mantilla
- (Bolivia) Alejandro Mendoza
- (South Africa) Dean O'Brien

== Champions ==
=== Men's singles ===
- (Colombia) Eduardo Struvay def. (Italy) Paolo Lorenzi 6–3, 4–6, 6–4

=== Men's doubles ===
- (Chile) Julio Peralta / (Argentina) Horacio Zeballos def. (Colombia) Nicolás Barrientos / (Colombia) Eduardo Struvay 6–3, 6–4
