= 2022 Open Bogotá – Singles =

Singles
- 2022 Open Bogotá

Final
- Champion: (Argentina) Juan Pablo Ficovich
- Runner-up: (Austria) Gerald Melzer
- Score: 6–1, 6–2

Events
Singles	Doubles
- Open Bogotá

Gerald Melzer was the defending champion but lost in the final to Juan Pablo Ficovich.

Ficovich won the title after defeating Melzer 6–1, 6–2 in the final.

== Seeds ==
1. (Argentina) Facundo Mena (second round)
2. (Argentina) Juan Pablo Ficovich (champion)
3. (Brazil) Felipe Meligeni Alves (quarterfinals)
4. (Argentina) Francisco Comesaña (withdrew)
5. (Austria) Gerald Melzer (final)
6. (Chile) Gonzalo Lama (first round)
7. (Serbia) Miljan Zekić (semifinals)
8. (Argentina) Gonzalo Villanueva (second round)
9. (United States) Aleksandar Kovacevic (first round)

== Draw ==
Key

- Q = Qualifier
- WC = Wild card
- LL = Lucky loser
- Alt = Alternate
- ITF = ITF entry
- PR = Protected ranking
- SR = Special ranking
- SE = Special exempt
- JE = Junior exempt
- JR = Junior Accelerator Programme entrant
- CO = College Accelerator Programme entrant
- NG = Next Gen Accelerator Program entrant
- w/o = Walkover
- r = Retired
- d = Defaulted

=== Finals ===
Semifinals
5	(Austria) Gerald Melzer	6	2	6
7	(Serbia) Miljan Zekić	1	6	4
(Dominican Republic) Nick Hardt	1	6	2
2	(Argentina) Juan Pablo Ficovich	6	2	6

Final
5	(Austria) Gerald Melzer	1	2
2	(Argentina) Juan Pablo Ficovich	6	6

=== Top half ===
First round
1	(Argentina) F Mena	7^{7}	6
(Serbia) P Krstin	6^{4}	2
(Peru) N Álvarez	7^{7}	4	6
(Argentina) RA Burruchaga	6^{4}	6	2
Q	(Argentina) Matías Zukas	4	6	3
(United States) E Zhu	6	2	6
(Spain) A Menéndez Maceiras	5	6	3
5	(Austria) G Melzer	7	0	6
3	(Brazil) F Meligeni Alves	6	6
Q	(United Kingdom) Blu Baker	4	1
(Norway) V Durasovic	6^{8}	6	6
LL	(India) M Sasikumar	7^{10}	2	2
(Tunisia) M Jaziri	5	6	6
WC	(Colombia) Nicolás Buitrago	7	2	4
Q	(Brazil) M Alves	7	5	5
7	(Serbia) M Zekić	5	7	7

Second round
1	(Argentina) F Mena	4	7^{7}	1
(Peru) N Álvarez	6	6^{5}	6
(United States) E Zhu	6^{3}	5
5	(Austria) G Melzer	7^{7}	7
3	(Brazil) F Meligeni Alves	6	6
(Norway) V Durasovic	2	3
(Tunisia) M Jaziri	6	3	6^{3}
7	(Serbia) M Zekić	3	6	7^{7}

Quarterfinals
(Peru) N Álvarez	6	3	5
5	(Austria) G Melzer	3	6	7
3	(Brazil) F Meligeni Alves	6	3	4
7	(Serbia) M Zekić	2	6	6

Semifinals
5	(Austria) G Melzer	6	2	6
7	(Serbia) M Zekić	1	6	4

=== Bottom half ===
First round
6	(Chile) G Lama	3	5
Q	(Argentina) Ignacio Monzón	6	7
(Argentina) Facundo Juárez	7	1	6
Q	(Japan) N Nakagawa	5	6	1
Q	(Peru) A Huertas del Pino	6	6
(Portugal) G Oliveira	2	3
(Dominican Republic) N Hardt	6	6
9	(United States) A Kovacevic	3	2
8	(Argentina) G Villanueva	6	6
WC	(Colombia) A Urrea	4	1
(Ecuador) R Quiroz	6	7
(Greece) M Pervolarakis	3	5
(Colombia) N Mejía	7^{7}	7^{7}
(United States) K Smith	6^{2}	6^{4}
WC	(Colombia) Sergio Luis Hernández Ramírez	2	6	3
2	(Argentina) JP Ficovich	6	4	6

Second round
Q	(Argentina) I Monzón	3	6	4
(Argentina) F Juárez	6	4	6
Q	(Peru) A Huertas del Pino	0	3
(Dominican Republic) N Hardt	6	6
8	(Argentina) G Villanueva	5	4
(Ecuador) R Quiroz	7	6
(Colombia) N Mejía	6^{3}	4
2	(Argentina) JP Ficovich	7^{7}	6

Quarterfinals
(Argentina) F Juárez	5	3
(Dominican Republic) N Hardt	7	6
(Ecuador) R Quiroz	3	6	3
2	(Argentina) JP Ficovich	6	3	6

Semifinals
(Dominican Republic) N Hardt	1	6	2
2	(Argentina) JP Ficovich	6	2	6
