= 2012 Open Seguros Bolívar =

- Date: 9 – 15 July
- Edition: 8th
- Surface: Clay
- Location: Bogotá, Colombia

Champions

Singles
- (Colombia) Alejandro Falla

Doubles
- (Brazil) Marcelo Demoliner / (Dominican Republic) Víctor Estrella
← 2011 ·	Open Seguros Bolívar	· 2013 →

The 2012 Open Seguros Bolívar was a professional tennis tournament played on clay courts. It was the eighth edition of the tournament which was part of the 2012 ATP Challenger Tour. It took place in Bogotá, Colombia between 9 and 15 July 2012.

== Singles main draw entrants ==
=== Seeds ===
Country	Player	Rank^{1}	Seed
ESP	Feliciano López	17	1
COL	Santiago Giraldo	45	2
COL	Alejandro Falla	73	3
FRA	Éric Prodon	121	4
COL	Carlos Salamanca	189	5
ARG	Guido Pella	205	6
COL	Alejandro González	226	7
DOM	Víctor Estrella	228	8

- ^{1} Rankings are as of June 25, 2012.

=== Other entrants ===
The following players received wildcards into the singles main draw:

- (Colombia) Santiago Giraldo
- (Chile) Gonzalo Lama
- (Spain) Feliciano López
- (Colombia) Michael Quintero

The following players received entry from the qualifying draw:

- (Colombia) Nicolás Barrientos
- (Italy) Erik Crepaldi
- (Guatemala) Christopher Díaz Figueroa
- (Ecuador) Roberto Quiroz

== Champions ==
=== Singles ===
- (Colombia) Alejandro Falla def. (Colombia) Santiago Giraldo, 7–5, 6–3

=== Doubles ===
- (Brazil) Marcelo Demoliner / (Dominican Republic) Víctor Estrella def. (Italy) Thomas Fabbiano / (Italy) Riccardo Ghedin, 6–4, 6–2
