= 2011 Open Seguros Bolívar =

- Date: 11–17 July 2011
- Edition: 7th (men); 5th (women)
- Location: Bogotá, Colombia

Champions

Men's singles
- (Spain) Feliciano López

Women's singles
- (Colombia) Mariana Duque

Men's doubles
- (Philippines) Treat Conrad Huey / (South Africa) Izak van der Merwe

Women's doubles
- (Venezuela) Andrea Gámiz / (Venezuela) Adriana Pérez
- Open Seguros Bolívar

The 2011 Open Seguros Bolívar was a professional tennis tournament played on clay courts. It was the seventh edition of the tournament which was part of the 2011 ATP Challenger Tour, and the fifth edition for the 2011 ITF Women's Circuit. It took place in Bogotá, Colombia between 11 and 17 July 2011.

== ATP singles main draw entrants ==
=== Seeds ===
Country	Player	Rank^{1}	Seed
ESP	Feliciano López	31	1
COL	Alejandro Falla	91	2
CHI	Paul Capdeville	109	3
ARG	Horacio Zeballos	116	4
BRA	João Souza	120	5
RSA	Izak van der Merwe	123	6
BRA	Rogério Dutra da Silva	135	7
ARG	Brian Dabul	164	8

- ^{1} Rankings are as of July 4, 2011.

=== Other entrants ===
The following players received wildcards into the singles main draw:

- (Colombia) Nicolás Barrientos
- (Spain) Feliciano López
- (Chile) Nicolás Massú
- (Colombia) Eduardo Struvay

The following players received entry from the qualifying draw:

- (Argentina) Guillermo Durán
- (Colombia) Juan Sebastián Gómez
- (Colombia) Sebastián López
- (Bolivia) Ryusei Makiguchi

== WTA entrants ==
=== Seeds ===
Country	Player	Rank^{1}	Seed
USA	Julia Cohen	168	1
BOL	María Fernanda Álvarez Terán	230	2
BRA	Vivian Segnini	321	3
CHI	Andrea Koch Benvenuto	342	4
COL	Mariana Duque	343	5
VEN	Andrea Gámiz	420	6
COL	Karen Castiblanco	448	7
VEN	Adriana Pérez	485	8

- ^{1} Rankings are as of July 4, 2011.

=== Other entrants ===
The following players received wildcards into the singles main draw:

- (United States) Veronia Corning
- (Colombia) Marcela Gómez
- (United States) Libby Muma
- (Colombia) Andrea Prisco

The following players received entry from the qualifying draw:

- (United Kingdom) Robyn Beddow
- (Bolivia) Patricia Cortes
- (Argentina) Mikele Irazusta
- (Colombia) Paula Catalina Robles Garcia
- (United States) Alexandra Riley
- (Colombia) Laura Sofia Sánchez Pérez
- (Colombia) Camila Tobar
- (Colombia) Diana Woodcock

The following players received entry by a lucky loser spot:

- (Argentina) Milagros Cubelli

== Champions ==
=== Men's singles ===
(Spain) Feliciano López def. (Colombia) Carlos Salamanca, 6–4, 6–3

=== Women's singles ===
(Colombia) Mariana Duque def. (Bolivia) María Fernanda Álvarez Terán, 7–6^{(8–6)}, 4–6, 6–3

=== Men's doubles ===
(Philippines) Treat Conrad Huey / (South Africa) Izak van der Merwe def. (Colombia) Juan Sebastián Cabal / (Colombia) Robert Farah, 7–6^{(7–3)}, 6–7^{(5–7)}, [7–2], defaulted

=== Women's doubles ===
(Venezuela) Andrea Gámiz / (Venezuela) Adriana Pérez def. (United States) Julia Cohen / (Chile) Andrea Koch Benvenuto, 6–3, 6–4
