= Open Bogotá =

ATP Challenger Tour
- Tour: ATP Challenger Tour; ITF Women's Circuit (2007–11, 2014)
- Location: Bogotá, Colombia
- Venue: América Tenis Club (2025), Carmel Country Club de Bogotá
- Surface: Clay
- Prize money: $60,000 (2025), $82,000 (2024) $100,000+H (women)
- Website: website

Kia Open Bogotá (previously DirecTV Open Bogotá, Open Seguros Bolívar, Seguros Bolívar Open Bogotá) is a tournament for professional tennis players played on outdoor clay courts held in Bogotá, Colombia since 2005. From 2005–2013 and from 2014–2017, it was an Association of Tennis Professionals (ATP) Challenger Tour men's event. The tournament was not held in 2018–2020 but returned to the Challenger Tour in 2021. The event was also held as an ITF Women's Circuit tournament from 2007 to 2011 and had a $25,000 prize money fund. A one-off $100,000+H women's tournament was also held in 2014. The men's tournament had an $82,000 prize money fund in 2024. Since 2025 it is known as the Kia Open.

== Past finals ==
=== Women's singles ===
Year	Champion	Runner-up	Score
2014	(Spain) Lara Arruabarrena	(Sweden) Johanna Larsson	6–1, 6–3
2012–13	Not held		
2011	(Colombia) Mariana Duque Mariño (2)	(Bolivia) María Fernanda Álvarez Terán	7–6^{(8–6)}, 4–6, 6–3
2010	(Argentina) Paula Ormaechea	(United States) Julia Cohen	7–5, 6–1
2009	(Venezuela) Marina Giral Lores	(Bolivia) María Fernanda Álvarez Terán	1–6, 6–4, 6–3
2008	(Colombia) Mariana Duque Mariño	(Bolivia) María Fernanda Álvarez Terán	6–0, 6–4
2007	(Colombia) Viky Núñez Fuentes	(Peru) Ingrid Várgas Calvo	7–5, 6–2

=== Women's doubles ===
Year	Champions	Runners-up	Score
2014	(Spain) Lara Arruabarrena (Argentina) Florencia Molinero	(Austria) Melanie Klaffner (Austria) Patricia Mayr-Achleitner	6–2, 6–0
2012–13	Not held		
2011	(Venezuela) Andrea Gámiz (2) (Venezuela) Adriana Pérez	(United States) Julia Cohen (Chile) Andrea Koch Benvenuto	6–3, 6–4
2010	(Venezuela) Andrea Gámiz (Argentina) Paula Ormaechea	(Argentina) Mailen Auroux (Colombia) Karen Castiblanco	5–7, 6–4, [10–8]
2009	(Colombia) Karen Castiblanco (Colombia) Paula Zabala	(Brazil) Maria Fernanda Alves (Italy) Nicole Clerico	1–6, 6–1, [10–7]
2008	(Colombia) Mariana Duque Mariño (Colombia) Viky Núñez Fuentes (2)	(Argentina) Mailen Auroux (Italy) Nicole Clerico	6–3, 6–4
2007	(Colombia) Gabriela Mejía Tenorio (Colombia) Viky Núñez Fuentes	(United States) Hannah Berner (United States) Nataly Yoo	6–0, 6–1

=== Men's singles ===
Year	Champion	Runner-up	Score
2026	(Colombia) Nicolás Mejía	(Chile) Matías Soto	6–1, 7–5
2025	(United States) Patrick Kypson	(Brazil) Pedro Sakamoto	6–1, 6–3
2024	(Argentina) Facundo Mena	(Brazil) Mateus Alves	6–4, 7–5
2023	(Argentina) Thiago Agustín Tirante	(Brazil) Gustavo Heide	Walkover
2022	(Argentina) Juan Pablo Ficovich	(Austria) Gerald Melzer	6–1, 6–2
2021	(Austria) Gerald Melzer	(Argentina) Facundo Mena	6–2, 3–6, 7–6^{(7–5)}
2018–20	Not held		
2017	(El Salvador) Marcelo Arévalo	(Colombia) Daniel Elahi Galán	7–5, 6–4
2016	(Argentina) Facundo Bagnis	(Argentina) Horacio Zeballos	3–6, 6–3, 7–6^{(7–4)}
2015	(Colombia) Eduardo Struvay	(Italy) Paolo Lorenzi	6–3, 4–6, 6–4
2014	Not held		
2013	(Dominican Republic) Víctor Estrella Burgos	(Brazil) Thomaz Bellucci	6–2, 3–0, retired
2012	(Colombia) Alejandro Falla	(Colombia) Santiago Giraldo	7–5, 6–3
2011	(Spain) Feliciano López	(Colombia) Carlos Salamanca	6–4, 6–3
2010	(Colombia) Robert Farah	(Colombia) Carlos Salamanca	6–3, 2–6, 7–6^{(7–3)}
2009	(Brazil) Marcos Daniel (2)	(Argentina) Horacio Zeballos	4–6, 7–6^{(7–5)}, 6–4
2008	(Argentina) Mariano Puerta	(Brazil) Ricardo Hocevar	7–6^{(7–2)}, 7–5
2007	(Colombia) Carlos Salamanca	(Brazil) Thomaz Bellucci	4–6, 6–3, 6–2
2006	(Colombia) Santiago Giraldo	(Mexico) Bruno Echagaray	6–3, 1–6, 6–2
2005	(Brazil) Marcos Daniel	(Netherlands Antilles) Jean-Julien Rojer	6–4, 6–4

=== Men's doubles ===
Year	Champions	Runners-up	Score
2026	(Chile) Matías Soto (2) (Bolivia) Federico Zeballos	(Ecuador) Gonzalo Escobar (Argentina) Facundo Mena	6–4, 2–6, [11–9]
2025	(Brazil) Luís Britto (Czech Republic) Zdeněk Kolář	(Peru) Arklon Huertas del Pino (Peru) Conner Huertas del Pino	6–4, 7–6^{(7–4)}
2024	(New Zealand) Finn Reynolds (Chile) Matías Soto	(Zimbabwe) Benjamin Lock (Brazil) João Lucas Reis da Silva	6–3, 6–4
2023	(Argentina) Renzo Olivo (Argentina) Thiago Agustín Tirante	(Argentina) Guillermo Durán (Brazil) Orlando Luz	7–6^{(8–6)}, 6–4
2022	(Colombia) Nicolás Mejía (Colombia) Andrés Urrea	(Argentina) Ignacio Monzón (Argentina) Gonzalo Villanueva	6–3, 6–4
2021	(Chile) Nicolás Jarry (Ecuador) Roberto Quiroz	(Colombia) Nicolás Barrientos (Colombia) Alejandro Gómez	6–7^{(4–7)}, 7–5, [10–4]
2018–20	Not held		
2017	(El Salvador) Marcelo Arévalo (4) (Mexico) Miguel Ángel Reyes-Varela	(Croatia) Nikola Mektić (Croatia) Franko Škugor	6–3, 3–6, [10–6]
2016	(El Salvador) Marcelo Arévalo (3) (Peru) Sergio Galdós	(Uruguay) Ariel Behar (Ecuador) Gonzalo Escobar	6–4, 6–1
2015	(Chile) Julio Peralta (Argentina) Horacio Zeballos	(Colombia) Nicolás Barrientos (Colombia) Eduardo Struvay	6–3, 6–4
2014	Not held		
2013	(Colombia) Juan Sebastián Cabal (2) (Colombia) Alejandro González	(Colombia) Nicolás Barrientos (Colombia) Eduardo Struvay	6–3, 6–2
2012	(Brazil) Marcelo Demoliner (2) (Dominican Republic) Víctor Estrella	(Italy) Thomas Fabbiano (Italy) Riccardo Ghedin	6–4, 6–2
2011	(Philippines) Treat Conrad Huey (South Africa) Izak van der Merwe	(Colombia) Juan Sebastián Cabal (Colombia) Robert Farah	7–6^{(7–3)}, 6–7^{(5–7)}, [7–2], defaulted
2010	(Colombia) Juan Sebastián Cabal (Colombia) Robert Farah	(Dominican Republic) Víctor Estrella (Colombia) Alejandro González	7–6^{(8–6)}, 6–4
2009	(Argentina) Sebastián Prieto (Argentina) Horacio Zeballos	(Brazil) Marcos Daniel (Brazil) Ricardo Mello	6–4, 7–5
2008	(Belgium) Xavier Malisse (Colombia) Carlos Salamanca	(Colombia) Juan Sebastián Cabal (Colombia) Michael Quintero	6–1, 6–4
2007	(Argentina) Brian Dabul (2) (Mexico) Santiago González	(Colombia) Pablo González (Argentina) Leonardo Mayer	6–2, 6–2
2006	(Mexico) Daniel Garza (Colombia) Michael Quintero	(Brazil) Rogério Dutra da Silva (Uruguay) Martín Vilarrubí	7–6^{(8–6)}, 6–4
2005	(Argentina) Brian Dabul (Brazil) Marcelo Melo	(Brazil) Marcos Daniel (Mexico) Santiago González	6–4, 6–4
