= 2025 Morelia Open – Singles =

Singles
- 2025 Morelia Open

Final
- Champion: (Kazakhstan) Dmitry Popko
- Runner-up: (Australia) James Duckworth
- Score: 1–6, 6–2, 6–4

Events
Singles	Doubles
Morelia Open	· 2026 →

This was the first edition of the tournament.

Dmitry Popko won the title after defeating James Duckworth 1–6, 6–2, 6–4 in the final.

== Seeds ==
1. (Australia) James Duckworth (final)
2. (United States) Christopher Eubanks (second round)
3. (United States) Brandon Holt (first round)
4. (Argentina) Thiago Agustín Tirante (quarterfinals)
5. (France) Adrian Mannarino (second round)
6. (Japan) Shintaro Mochizuki (first round)
7. (Canada) Alexis Galarneau (first round)
8. (Argentina) Juan Pablo Ficovich (second round)

== Draw ==
=== Key ===
- Q = Qualifier
- WC = Wild card
- LL = Lucky loser
- Alt = Alternate
- ITF = ITF entry
- PR = Protected ranking
- SR = Special ranking
- SE = Special exempt
- JE = Junior exempt
- JR = Junior Accelerator Programme entrant
- CO = College Accelerator Programme entrant
- NG = Next Gen Accelerator Program entrant
- w/o = Walkover
- r = Retired
- d = Defaulted

=== Finals ===
Semifinals
1	(Australia) James Duckworth	6	6
Alt	(Kazakhstan) Beibit Zhukayev	2	4
Alt	(Kazakhstan) Dmitry Popko	6	6
(France) Hugo Grenier	2	1

Final
1	(Australia) James Duckworth	6	2	4
Alt	(Kazakhstan) Dmitry Popko	1	6	6

=== Top half ===
First round
1	(Australia) J Duckworth	6	6
WC	(Mexico) AF Rubio Fierros	1	3
Q	(United States) A Perez	4	6^{3}
Q	(United States) T Zink	6	7^{7}
(Colombia) N Mejía	4	6	4
WC	(Mexico) A Hernández	6	3	6
(United States) Z Svajda	4	3
8	(Argentina) JP Ficovich	6	6
3	(United States) B Holt	4	1
(Switzerland) M-A Hüsler	6	6
(Australia) J McCabe	7^{11}	6^{1}	6^{3}
(Japan) J Trotter	6^{9}	7^{7}	7^{7}
(Austria) J Rodionov	1	3
Alt	(Kazakhstan) B Zhukayev	6	6
(Brazil) F Meligeni Alves	4	7^{7}	6
7	(Canada) A Galarneau	6	6^{4}	4

Second round
1	(Australia) J Duckworth	7	6
Q	(United States) T Zink	5	3
WC	(Mexico) A Hernández	7	6
8	(Argentina) JP Ficovich	5	2
(Switzerland) M-A Hüsler	6	6
(Japan) J Trotter	4	4
Alt	(Kazakhstan) B Zhukayev	7^{7}	6
(Brazil) F Meligeni Alves	6^{5}	4

Quarterfinals
1	(Australia) J Duckworth	6	7^{8}
WC	(Mexico) A Hernández	4	6^{6}
(Switzerland) M-A Hüsler	3	7^{7}	4
Alt	(Kazakhstan) B Zhukayev	6	6^{2}	6

Semifinals
1	(Australia) J Duckworth	6	6
Alt	(Kazakhstan) B Zhukayev	2	4

=== Bottom half ===
First round
5	(France) A Mannarino	6	6
Q	(Italy) S Napolitano	3	2
(France) T Atmane	6^{6}	7^{7}	3
Alt	(Kazakhstan) D Popko	7^{8}	6^{4}	6
Alt	(United States) M Cassone	4	6	6
Q	(Germany) Elmar Ejupovic	6	3	2
Q	(Austria) M Neuchrist	6^{7}	4
4	(Argentina) TA Tirante	7^{9}	6
6	(Japan) S Mochizuki	1	7^{7}	4
Alt	(Australia) B Tomic	6	6^{3}	6
(Estonia) M Lajal	6	7^{8}
WC	(Mexico) R Pacheco Méndez	1	6^{6}
Q	(New Zealand) K Pannu	4	4
(France) H Grenier	6	6
(France) C Lestienne	4	0^{r}
2	(United States) C Eubanks	6	3

Second round
5	(France) A Mannarino	2	3
Alt	(Kazakhstan) D Popko	6	6
Alt	(United States) M Cassone	3	7^{7}	3
4	(Argentina) TA Tirante	6	6^{4}	6
Alt	(Australia) B Tomic	6	3	7^{8}
(Estonia) M Lajal	2	6	6^{6}
(France) H Grenier	6	6
2	(United States) C Eubanks	4	4

Quarterfinals
Alt	(Kazakhstan) D Popko	6	6
4	(Argentina) TA Tirante	1	4
Alt	(Australia) B Tomic	6	6^{4}	2
(France) H Grenier	2	7^{7}	6

Semifinals
Alt	(Kazakhstan) D Popko	6	6
(France) H Grenier	2	1
