= 2023 Challenger de Santiago =

- Date: 6–12 March
- Edition: 17th
- Surface: Clay
- Location: Santiago, Chile

Champions

Singles
- (Bolivia) Hugo Dellien

Doubles
- (Brazil) Pedro Boscardin Dias / (Brazil) João Lucas Reis da Silva
← 2022 ·	Challenger de Santiago	· 2024 →

The 2023 Challenger de Santiago was a professional tennis tournament played on clay courts. It was the 17th edition of the tournament which was part of the 2023 ATP Challenger Tour. It took place in Santiago, Chile between 6 and 12 March 2023.

== Singles main-draw entrants ==
=== Seeds ===
Country	Player	Rank^{1}	Seed
~~CHI~~	~~Nicolás Jarry~~	~~87~~	~~1~~
ITA	Marco Cecchinato	91	2
ARG	Facundo Bagnis	94	3
BOL	Hugo Dellien	96	4
ARG	Juan Manuel Cerúndolo	108	5
ARG	Camilo Ugo Carabelli	122	6
ITA	Franco Agamenone	164	7
ARG	Facundo Díaz Acosta	171	8

- ^{1} Rankings are as of 27 February 2023.

=== Other entrants ===
The following players received wildcards into the singles main draw:

- (Chile) Gonzalo Lama
- (Chile) ~~Matías Soto~~
- (Chile) Nicolás Villalón

The following players received entry from the qualifying draw:

- (Brazil) Daniel Dutra da Silva
- (Italy) Federico Gaio
- (France) Hugo Gaston
- (Spain) Álvaro López San Martín
- (Brazil) Thiago Seyboth Wild
- (Argentina) Juan Bautista Torres

The following players received entry as lucky losers:

- (Brazil) João Lucas Reis da Silva
- (Argentina) Gonzalo Villanueva

== Champions ==
=== Singles ===
- (Bolivia) Hugo Dellien def. (Brazil) Thiago Seyboth Wild 3–6, 6–3, 6–3.

=== Doubles ===
- (Brazil) Pedro Boscardin Dias / (Brazil) João Lucas Reis da Silva def. (Ecuador) Diego Hidalgo / (Colombia) Cristian Rodríguez 6–4, 3–6, [10–7].
