= 2025 Costa do Sauípe Open – Singles =

Singles
- 2025 Costa do Sauípe Open

Final
- Champion: (Argentina) Román Andrés Burruchaga
- Runner-up: (Paraguay) Daniel Vallejo
- Score: 6–1, 6–2

Events
Singles	Doubles
Costa do Sauípe Open	· 2026 →

This was the first edition of the tournament.

Román Andrés Burruchaga won the title after defeating Daniel Vallejo 6–1, 6–2 in the final.

== Seeds ==
1. (Argentina) Mariano Navone (quarterfinals)
2. (Argentina) Juan Manuel Cerúndolo (quarterfinals)
3. (United States) Emilio Nava (quarterfinals)
4. (Argentina) Thiago Agustín Tirante (quarterfinals)
5. (Spain) Carlos Taberner (second round)
6. (Chile) Cristian Garín (semifinals, retired)
7. (Chile) Tomás Barrios Vera (first round)
8. (Bolivia) Hugo Dellien (withdrew)
9. (Argentina) Román Andrés Burruchaga (champion)

== Draw ==
=== Key ===
- Q = Qualifier
- WC = Wild card
- LL = Lucky loser
- Alt = Alternate
- ITF = ITF entry
- PR = Protected ranking
- SR = Special ranking
- SE = Special exempt
- JE = Junior exempt
- JR = Junior Accelerator Programme entrant
- CO = College Accelerator Programme entrant
- NG = Next Gen Accelerator Program entrant
- w/o = Walkover
- r = Retired
- d = Defaulted

=== Finals ===
Semifinals
6	(Chile) Cristian Garín	4	0^{r}
SE	(Paraguay) Daniel Vallejo	6	0
(Bolivia) Juan Carlos Prado Ángelo	2	2
9	(Argentina) Román Andrés Burruchaga	6	6

Final
SE	(Paraguay) Daniel Vallejo	1	2
9	(Argentina) Román Andrés Burruchaga	6	6

=== Top half ===
First round
1	(Argentina) M Navone	6	6
(Lebanon) H Habib	4	1
SE	(Brazil) P Boscardin Dias	6	6
(Argentina) JP Ficovich	4	2
WC	(Brazil) L Miguel	7^{7}	5	2
Q	(Argentina) A Collarini	6^{2}	7	6
(Argentina) GA Olivieri	4	4
6	(Chile) C Garín	6	6
4	(Argentina) TA Tirante	7	6^{3}	6
(Argentina) A Barrena	5	7^{7}	3
Alt	(Argentina) F Díaz Acosta	6	6
(Czech Republic) Z Kolář	0	2
Q	(Brazil) Igor Gimenez	0	2
SE	(Paraguay) AD Vallejo	6	6
Q	(Brazil) M Pucinelli de Almeida	7^{7}	2	6
7	(Chile) T Barrios Vera	6^{4}	6	2

Second round
1	(Argentina) M Navone	6	6
SE	(Brazil) P Boscardin Dias	4	2
Q	(Argentina) A Collarini	1	6	4
6	(Chile) C Garín	6	4	6
4	(Argentina) TA Tirante	7^{7}	6
Alt	(Argentina) F Díaz Acosta	6^{3}	4
SE	(Paraguay) AD Vallejo	6	6
Q	(Brazil) M Pucinelli de Almeida	4	2

Quarterfinals
1	(Argentina) M Navone	6^{4}	2
6	(Chile) C Garín	7^{7}	6
4	(Argentina) TA Tirante	4	2
SE	(Paraguay) AD Vallejo	6	6

Semifinals
6	(Chile) C Garín	4	0^{r}
SE	(Paraguay) AD Vallejo	6	0

=== Bottom half ===
First round
5	(Spain) C Taberner	6	3	6
Q	(Argentina) G Villanueva	3	6	4
(Brazil) T Monteiro	6^{6}	1
(Bolivia) JC Prado Ángelo	7^{8}	6
(Peru) G Bueno	6	4	6
Q	(Brazil) M Alves	4	6	1
(Mexico) R Pacheco Méndez	3	4
3	(United States) E Nava	6	6
9	(Argentina) RA Burruchaga	6	6
WC	(Brazil) João Eduardo Schiessl	4	2
(Brazil) JL Reis da Silva	7^{7}	4	2
(Argentina) S Rodríguez Taverna	6^{2}	6	6
(Argentina) FA Gómez	2	6	0
WC	(Brazil) G Heide	6	2	6
Q	(Romania) Sebastian Gima	3	5
2	(Argentina) JM Cerúndolo	6	7

Second round
5	(Spain) C Taberner	6	3	4
(Bolivia) JC Prado Ángelo	4	6	6
(Peru) G Bueno	2	3
3	(United States) E Nava	6	6
9	(Argentina) RA Burruchaga	7	6^{4}	6
(Argentina) S Rodríguez Taverna	5	7^{7}	2
WC	(Brazil) G Heide	4	3
2	(Argentina) JM Cerúndolo	6	6

Quarterfinals
(Bolivia) JC Prado Ángelo	7^{7}	6
3	(United States) E Nava	6^{2}	1
9	(Argentina) RA Burruchaga	6	6
2	(Argentina) JM Cerúndolo	2	3

Semifinals
(Bolivia) JC Prado Ángelo	2	2
9	(Argentina) RA Burruchaga	6	6
