= 2025 Costa do Sauípe Open =

- Date: 20 – 26 October
- Edition: 1st
- Surface: Clay
- Location: Sauipe, Brazil

Champions

Singles
- (Argentina) Román Andrés Burruchaga

Doubles
- (Brazil) Luís Miguel / (Brazil) Eduardo Ribeiro
- Costa do Sauípe Open

The 2025 Costa do Sauípe Open was a professional tennis tournament played on clay courts. It was the first edition of the tournament which was part of the 2025 ATP Challenger Tour. It took place in Sauipe, Brazil between 20 and 26 October 2025.

== Singles main-draw entrants ==
=== Seeds ===
Country	Player	Rank^{1}	Seed
ARG	Mariano Navone	85	1
ARG	Juan Manuel Cerúndolo	87	2
USA	Emilio Nava	93	3
ARG	Thiago Agustín Tirante	100	4
ESP	Carlos Taberner	103	5
CHI	Cristian Garín	108	6
CHI	Tomás Barrios Vera	119	7
~~BOL~~	~~Hugo Dellien~~	~~129~~	~~8~~
ARG	Román Andrés Burruchaga	131	9

- ^{1} Rankings are as of 13 October 2025.

=== Other entrants ===
The following players received wildcards into the singles main draw:

- (Brazil) Gustavo Heide
- (Brazil) Luís Miguel
- (Brazil) João Eduardo Schiessl

The following players received entry into the singles main draw as special exempts:

- (Brazil) Pedro Boscardin Dias
- (Paraguay) Daniel Vallejo

The following player received entry into the singles main draw as an alternate:

- (Argentina) Facundo Díaz Acosta

The following players received entry from the qualifying draw:

- (Brazil) Mateus Alves
- (Argentina) Andrea Collarini
- (Romania) Sebastian Gima
- (Brazil) Igor Gimenez
- (Brazil) Matheus Pucinelli de Almeida
- (Argentina) Gonzalo Villanueva

== Champions ==
=== Singles ===
- (Argentina) Román Andrés Burruchaga def. (Paraguay) Daniel Vallejo 6–1, 6–2.

=== Doubles ===
- (Brazil) Luís Miguel / (Brazil) Eduardo Ribeiro def. (Ecuador) Gonzalo Escobar / (Mexico) Miguel Ángel Reyes-Varela 7–6^{(7–4)}, 4–6, [10–5].
