= 2026 Costa do Sauípe Open – Doubles =

Doubles
- 2026 Costa do Sauípe Open

Final
- Champions: (Czech Republic) Zdeněk Kolář (Argentina) Santiago Rodríguez Taverna
- Runners-up: (Ecuador) Diego Hidalgo (Argentina) Andrés Molteni
- Score: 6–4, 6–4

Events
| Singles | Doubles |
- Costa do Sauípe Open

Guto Miguel and Eduardo Ribeiro were the defending champions but chose to defend their title with different partners. Miguel partnered Luís Felipe Miguel but lost in the quarterfinals to Zdeněk Kolář and Santiago Rodríguez Taverna. Ribeiro partnered Natan Rodrigues but lost in the semifinals to Kolář and Rodríguez Taverna.

Kolář and Rodríguez Taverna won the title after defeating Diego Hidalgo and Andrés Molteni 6–4, 6–4 in the final.

== Seeds ==
1. (Ecuador) Diego Hidalgo / (Argentina) Andrés Molteni (final)
2. (Colombia) Nicolás Barrientos / (Argentina) Mariano Kestelboim (first round)
3. (Bolivia) Federico Zeballos / (Brazil) Marcelo Zormann (quarterfinals)
4. (Poland) Karol Drzewiecki / (Poland) Piotr Matuszewski (first round)

== Draw ==
Key

- Q = Qualifier
- WC = Wild card
- LL = Lucky loser
- Alt = Alternate
- ITF = ITF entry
- PR = Protected ranking
- SR = Special ranking
- SE = Special exempt
- JE = Junior exempt
- JR = Junior Accelerator Programme entrant
- CO = College Accelerator Programme entrant
- NG = Next Gen Accelerator Program entrant
- w/o = Walkover
- r = Retired
- d = Defaulted

First round
1 | (Ecuador) D Hidalgo (Argentina) A Molteni | 6 | 6
(Bolivia) B Arias (Uruguay) I Carou | 3 | 3
Alt | (Brazil) M Alves (Brazil) Lucas Andrade da Silva | 6 | 6
(Bulgaria) A Genov (Morocco) Y Lalami | 4 | 4
4 | (Poland) K Drzewiecki (Poland) P Matuszewski | 5 | 3
WC | (Brazil) I Marcondes (Brazil) F Meligeni Alves | 7 | 6
(Argentina) GI Justo (Argentina) L Midón | 2 | 6 | [16]
(Brazil) Bruno Oliveira (Brazil) PA Saraiva dos Santos | 6 | 4 | [14]
(Chile) T Barrios Vera (Brazil) M Pucinelli de Almeida
(Brazil) E Ribeiro (Brazil) Natan Rodrigues | w/o
(Brazil) P Boscardin Dias (Brazil) G Heide
3 | (Bolivia) F Zeballos (Brazil) M Zormann | w/o
(Italy) M Cecchinato (Spain) N Sánchez Izquierdo | 4 | 2
WC | (Brazil) G Miguel (Brazil) LF Miguel | 6 | 6
(Czech Republic) Z Kolář (Argentina) S Rodríguez Taverna | 6 | 3 | [10]
2 | (Colombia) N Barrientos (Argentina) M Kestelboim | 2 | 6 | [7]

Quarterfinals
1 | (Ecuador) D Hidalgo (Argentina) A Molteni | 6 | 6
Alt | (Brazil) M Alves (Brazil) L Andrade da Silva | 2 | 3
WC | (Brazil) I Marcondes (Brazil) F Meligeni Alves | 6 | 6^{5} | [3]
(Argentina) GI Justo (Argentina) L Midón | 1 | 7^{7} | [10]
(Brazil) E Ribeiro (Brazil) N Rodrigues | 6^{4} | 7 | [10]
3 | (Bolivia) F Zeballos (Brazil) M Zormann | 7^{7} | 5 | [8]
WC | (Brazil) G Miguel (Brazil) LF Miguel | 6^{4} | 3
(Czech Republic) Z Kolář (Argentina) S Rodríguez Taverna | 7^{7} | 6

Semifinals
1 | (Ecuador) D Hidalgo (Argentina) A Molteni | 7 | 7^{7}
(Argentina) GI Justo (Argentina) L Midón | 5 | 6^{2}
(Brazil) E Ribeiro (Brazil) N Rodrigues | 4 | 2
(Czech Republic) Z Kolář (Argentina) S Rodríguez Taverna | 6 | 6

Final
1 | (Ecuador) D Hidalgo (Argentina) A Molteni | 4 | 4
(Czech Republic) Z Kolář (Argentina) S Rodríguez Taverna | 6 | 6
