= 2025 Morelia Open – Doubles =

Doubles
- 2025 Morelia Open

Final
- Champions: (Ecuador) Gonzalo Escobar (Ecuador) Diego Hidalgo
- Runners-up: (Switzerland) Marc-Andrea Hüsler (Italy) Stefano Napolitano
- Score: 6–4, 4–6, [10–3]

Events
Singles	Doubles
- Morelia Open

This was the first edition of the tournament.

Gonzalo Escobar and Diego Hidalgo won the title after defeating Marc-Andrea Hüsler and Stefano Napolitano 6–4, 4–6, [10–3] in the final.

== Seeds ==
1. (India) Sriram Balaji / (Mexico) Miguel Ángel Reyes-Varela (first round)
2. (Colombia) Nicolás Barrientos / (India) Rithvik Choudary Bollipalli (first round)
3. (Ecuador) Gonzalo Escobar / (Ecuador) Diego Hidalgo (champions)
4. (Mexico) Santiago González / (Mexico) Hans Hach Verdugo (quarterfinals)

== Draw ==
Key

- Q = Qualifier
- WC = Wild card
- LL = Lucky loser
- Alt = Alternate
- ITF = ITF entry
- PR = Protected ranking
- SR = Special ranking
- SE = Special exempt
- JE = Junior exempt
- JR = Junior Accelerator Programme entrant
- CO = College Accelerator Programme entrant
- NG = Next Gen Accelerator Program entrant
- w/o = Walkover
- r = Retired
- d = Defaulted

=== Draw ===
First round
1	(India) S Balaji (Mexico) M Reyes-Varela	3	4
WC	(Argentina) JP Ficovich (Mexico) R Pacheco Méndez	6	6
(Canada) A Galarneau (United States) M Kiger	6	6
WC	(Mexico) Daniel Moreno (Mexico) AF Rubio Fierros	4	4
3	(Ecuador) G Escobar (Ecuador) D Hidalgo	6	6
(United States) G Goldhoff (United States) T Hilderbrand	3	4
(Venezuela) LD Martínez (United States) P Trhac	7^{9}	6^{6}	[10]
Alt	(United States) M Cassone (Estonia) M Lajal	6^{7}	7^{8}	[8]
I Liutarevich (United Kingdom) M Willis	6	6
(Brazil) M Alves (Brazil) F Meligeni Alves	4	4
(Australia) P Harper (New Zealand) F Reynolds	5	6	[10]
4	(Mexico) S González (Mexico) H Hach Verdugo	7	3	[12]
(Chinese Taipei) R Ho (United States) R Stalder	7^{7}	7^{7}
(Zimbabwe) CJ Lock (Colombia) N Mejía	6^{2}	6^{4}
PR	(Switzerland) M-A Hüsler (Italy) S Napolitano	6	6
2	(Colombia) N Barrientos (India) RC Bollipalli	4	3

Quarterfinals
WC	(Argentina) JP Ficovich (Mexico) R Pacheco Méndez	3	5
(Canada) A Galarneau (United States) M Kiger	6	7
3	(Ecuador) G Escobar (Ecuador) D Hidalgo	7^{7}	6^{8}	[11]
(Venezuela) LD Martínez (United States) P Trhac	6^{1}	7^{10}	[9]
I Liutarevich (United Kingdom) M Willis	4	7^{8}	[10]
4	(Mexico) S González (Mexico) H Hach Verdugo	6	6^{6}	[5]
(Chinese Taipei) R Ho (United States) R Stalder	6^{4}	4
PR	(Switzerland) M-A Hüsler (Italy) S Napolitano	7^{7}	6

Semifinals
(Canada) A Galarneau (United States) M Kiger	4	6	[6]
3	(Ecuador) G Escobar (Ecuador) D Hidalgo	6	4	[10]
I Liutarevich (United Kingdom) M Willis	3	7^{7}	[7]
PR	(Switzerland) M-A Hüsler (Italy) S Napolitano	6	6^{2}	[10]

Final
3	(Ecuador) G Escobar (Ecuador) D Hidalgo	6	4	[10]
PR	(Switzerland) M-A Hüsler (Italy) S Napolitano	4	6	[3]
