= 2026 Costa do Sauípe Open – Singles =

Singles
- 2026 Costa do Sauípe Open

Final
- Champion: (Argentina) Camilo Ugo Carabelli
- Runner-up: (Brazil) Thiago Seyboth Wild
- Score: 6–2, 7–5

Events
| Singles | Doubles |
- Costa do Sauípe Open

Román Andrés Burruchaga was the defending champion but chose not to defend his title.

Camilo Ugo Carabelli won the title after defeating Thiago Seyboth Wild 6–2, 7–5 in the final.

== Seeds ==
1. (Argentina) Facundo Díaz Acosta (semifinals)
2. (Argentina) Camilo Ugo Carabelli (champion)
3. (Portugal) Henrique Rocha (first round)
4. (Brazil) Thiago Seyboth Wild (final)
5. (Brazil) Gustavo Heide (second round)
6. (Bolivia) Hugo Dellien (withdrew)
7. (Argentina) Francisco Comesaña (first round)
8. (Denmark) Elmer Møller (second round)

== Draw ==
Key

- Q = Qualifier
- WC = Wild card
- LL = Lucky loser
- Alt = Alternate
- ITF = ITF entry
- PR = Protected ranking
- SR = Special ranking
- SE = Special exempt
- JE = Junior exempt
- JR = Junior Accelerator Programme entrant
- CO = College Accelerator Programme entrant
- NG = Next Gen Accelerator Program entrant
- w/o = Walkover
- r = Retired
- d = Defaulted

=== Finals ===
Semifinals
1 | (Argentina) Facundo Díaz Acosta | 6^{5} | 4
4 | (Brazil) Thiago Seyboth Wild | 7^{7} | 6
(Peru) Gonzalo Bueno | 3 | 1
2 | (Argentina) Camilo Ugo Carabelli | 6 | 6

Final
4 | (Brazil) Thiago Seyboth Wild | 2 | 5
2 | (Argentina) Camilo Ugo Carabelli | 6 | 7

=== Top half ===
First round
1 | (Argentina) F Díaz Acosta | 6 | 6
(Brazil) M Pucinelli de Almeida | 3 | 4
Q | (Austria) F Misolic | 6^{3} | 6 | 6
(Peru) JP Varillas | 7^{7} | 2 | 3
(Brazil) T Monteiro | 7 | 6
Q | (Brazil) Leonardo Storck França | 5 | 4
(Italy) M Cecchinato | 6 | 6^{4} | 7^{7}
7 | (Argentina) F Comesaña | 1 | 7^{7} | 6^{0}
4 | (Brazil) T Seyboth Wild | 6 | 6
WC | (Brazil) F Meligeni Alves | 2 | 3
Q | (Brazil) Rafael Tosetto | 5 | 7 | 1
(Uruguay) F Roncadelli | 7 | 5 | 6
(Brazil) JL Reis da Silva | 7^{7} | 6
Q | (Argentina) S Rodríguez Taverna | 6^{2} | 2
(Czech Republic) Z Kolář | 2 | 2
8 | (Denmark) E Møller | 6 | 6

Second round
1 | (Argentina) F Díaz Acosta | 4 | 7^{7} | 6
Q | (Austria) F Misolic | 6 | 6^{5} | 4
(Brazil) T Monteiro | 6^{5} | 4
(Italy) M Cecchinato | 7^{7} | 6
4 | (Brazil) T Seyboth Wild | 6 | 7^{7}
(Uruguay) F Roncadelli | 1 | 6^{5}
(Brazil) JL Reis da Silva | 6 | 6
8 | (Denmark) E Møller | 2 | 1

Quarterfinals
1 | (Argentina) F Díaz Acosta | 6 | 6
(Italy) M Cecchinato | 4 | 4
4 | (Brazil) T Seyboth Wild | 7^{7} | 6
(Brazil) JL Reis da Silva | 6^{4} | 2

Semifinals
1 | (Argentina) F Díaz Acosta | 6^{5} | 4
4 | (Brazil) T Seyboth Wild | 7^{7} | 6

=== Bottom half ===
First round
Q | (Colombia) DE Galán | 6 | 5^{r}
(Peru) G Bueno | 4 | 5
LL | (Brazil) E Ribeiro | 6 | 6
WC | (Brazil) G Miguel | 3 | 1
WC | (Brazil) Lucas Andrade da Silva | 6^{3} | 3
(Argentina) L Midón | 7^{7} | 6
(Chile) T Barrios Vera | 6 | 7^{10}
3 | (Portugal) H Rocha | 4 | 6^{8}
5 | (Brazil) G Heide | 7^{8} | 7^{7}
(Argentina) GI Justo | 6^{6} | 6^{4}
(Bolivia) JC Prado Ángelo | 6 | 6
(Brazil) P Boscardin Dias | 1 | 4
Q | (Brazil) LF Miguel | 5 | 3
Alt | (Brazil) I Marcondes | 7 | 6
(Spain) N Sánchez Izquierdo | 7^{8} | 4 | 2
2 | (Argentina) C Ugo Carabelli | 6^{6} | 6 | 6

Second round
(Peru) G Bueno | 7^{7} | 7^{7}
LL | (Brazil) E Ribeiro | 6^{2} | 6^{2}
(Argentina) L Midón | 7 | 3 | 7
(Chile) T Barrios Vera | 5 | 6 | 5
5 | (Brazil) G Heide | 0 | 6 | 4
(Bolivia) JC Prado Ángelo | 6 | 3 | 6
Alt | (Brazil) I Marcondes | 4 | 4
2 | (Argentina) C Ugo Carabelli | 6 | 6

Quarterfinals
(Peru) G Bueno | 6 | 6
(Argentina) L Midón | 1 | 2
(Bolivia) JC Prado Ángelo | 2 | 3
2 | (Argentina) C Ugo Carabelli | 6 | 6

Semifinals
(Peru) G Bueno | 3 | 1
2 | (Argentina) C Ugo Carabelli | 6 | 6
