= 2026 Morelia Open – Doubles =

Doubles
- 2026 Morelia Open

Final
- Champions: (Ecuador) Diego Hidalgo (United States) Patrik Trhac
- Runners-up: (United States) Nathaniel Lammons (United States) Jackson Withrow
- Score: 7–6^{(7–5)}, 7–6^{(7–4)}

Events
Singles	Doubles
- Morelia Open

Gonzalo Escobar and Diego Hidalgo were the defending champions but only Hidalgo chose to defend his title, partnering Patrik Trhac. He successfully defended his title after defeating Nathaniel Lammons and Jackson Withrow 7–6^{(7–5)}, 7–6^{(7–4)} in the final.

== Seeds ==
1. (Ecuador) Diego Hidalgo / (United States) Patrik Trhac (champions)
2. (France) Arthur Reymond / (France) Luca Sanchez (first round)
3. (United States) Trey Hilderbrand / (Netherlands) Jean-Julien Rojer (first round)
4. (India) Anirudh Chandrasekar / (Japan) Takeru Yuzuki (first round)

== Draw ==
Key

- Q = Qualifier
- WC = Wild card
- LL = Lucky loser
- Alt = Alternate
- ITF = ITF entry
- PR = Protected ranking
- SR = Special ranking
- SE = Special exempt
- JE = Junior exempt
- JR = Junior Accelerator Programme entrant
- CO = College Accelerator Programme entrant
- NG = Next Gen Accelerator Program entrant
- w/o = Walkover
- r = Retired
- d = Defaulted

First round
1	(Ecuador) D Hidalgo (United States) P Trhac	6	6
(United States) P Kumar (United States) K Poling	2	3
(Australia) P Harper (United States) T Winegar	6	3	[10]
(India) RC Bollipalli (India) A Kadhe	3	6	[6]
4	(India) A Chandrasekar (Japan) T Yuzuki	4	6^{3}
(Switzerland) M-A Hüsler (Netherlands) T Loof	6	7^{7}
(Argentina) JP Ficovich (Colombia) N Mejía	7^{7}	6
WC	(Mexico) Rafael de Alba (Colombia) Miguel Tobón	6^{4}	3
(United States) N Lammons (United States) J Withrow	6	7^{7}
(Argentina) F Mena (Mexico) R Pacheco Méndez	3	6^{4}
(Mexico) M Reyes-Varela (Bolivia) F Zeballos	3	7^{8}	[10]
3	(United States) T Hilderbrand (Netherlands) J-J Rojer	6	6^{6}	[6]
(Brazil) M Alves (Antigua and Barbuda) J Maginley	6^{2}	6	[10]
WC	(Mexico) Rodrigo Alujas (Mexico) Guillermo Tunas	7^{7}	2	[6]
(Australia) Ja Delaney (Australia) M Polmans	6	7
2	(France) A Reymond (France) L Sanchez	2	5

Quarterfinals
1	(Ecuador) D Hidalgo (United States) P Trhac	7^{7}	7
(Australia) P Harper (United States) T Winegar	6^{2}	5
(Switzerland) M-A Hüsler (Netherlands) T Loof	6^{8}	6^{4}
(Argentina) JP Ficovich (Colombia) N Mejía	7^{10}	7^{7}
(United States) N Lammons (United States) J Withrow	2	6	[10]
(Mexico) M Reyes-Varela (Bolivia) F Zeballos	6	1	[6]
(Brazil) M Alves (Antigua and Barbuda) J Maginley	2	3
(Australia) Ja Delaney (Australia) M Polmans	6	6

Semifinals
1	(Ecuador) D Hidalgo (United States) P Trhac	6	7^{7}
(Argentina) JP Ficovich (Colombia) N Mejía	3	6^{5}
(United States) N Lammons (United States) J Withrow	7	6
(Australia) Ja Delaney (Australia) M Polmans	5	4

Final
1	(Ecuador) D Hidalgo (United States) P Trhac	7^{7}	7^{7}
(United States) N Lammons (United States) J Withrow	6^{5}	6^{4}
