= 2023 Challenger de Santiago – Doubles =

Doubles
- 2023 Challenger de Santiago

Final
- Champions: (Brazil) Pedro Boscardin Dias (Brazil) João Lucas Reis da Silva
- Runners-up: (Ecuador) Diego Hidalgo (Colombia) Cristian Rodríguez
- Score: 6–4, 3–6, [10–7]

Events
Singles	Doubles
← 2022 ·	Challenger de Santiago	· 2024 →

Diego Hidalgo and Cristian Rodríguez were the defending champions but lost in the final to Pedro Boscardin Dias and João Lucas Reis da Silva.

Boscardin Dias and Reis da Silva won the title after defeating Hidalgo and Rodríguez 6–4, 3–6, [10–7] in the final.

== Seeds ==
1. (Ecuador) Diego Hidalgo / (Colombia) Cristian Rodríguez (final)
2. (Italy) Luciano Darderi / (Italy) Andrea Vavassori (first round)
3. (Spain) Sergio Martos Gornés / (New Zealand) Artem Sitak (quarterfinals)
4. (Philippines) Ruben Gonzales / (Brazil) Fernando Romboli (quarterfinals)

== Draw ==
=== Key ===
- Q = Qualifier
- WC = Wild card
- LL = Lucky loser
- Alt = Alternate
- SE = Special exempt
- PR = Protected ranking
- ITF = ITF entry
- JE = Junior exempt
- w/o = Walkover
- r = Retired
- d = Defaulted
- SR = Special ranking

First round
1	(Ecuador) D Hidalgo (Colombia) C Rodríguez	7	6
(Italy) R Bonadio (Italy) A Pellegrino	5	3
(Brazil) O Luz (Brazil) M Zormann	6	6
(Italy) F Agamenone (Argentina) H Casanova	3	3
4	(Philippines) R Gonzales (Brazil) F Romboli	6^{7}	6	[10]
(Argentina) TA Tirante (Argentina) JB Torres	7^{9}	3	[4]
(Peru) A Huertas del Pino (Peru) C Huertas del Pino	6	6
WC	(Chile) Benjamín Torres (Chile) Nicolás Villalón	4	3
(Brazil) D Dutra da Silva (Argentina) M Navone	6	2	[7]
Alt	(Brazil) P Boscardin Dias (Brazil) JL Reis da Silva	0	6	[10]
Alt	(Spain) Á López San Martín (Argentina) G Villanueva	3	6	[7]
3	(Spain) S Martos Gornés (New Zealand) A Sitak	6	3	[10]
(Argentina) RA Burruchaga (Argentina) GA Olivieri	6	4	[10]
Alt	(Peru) G Bueno (United States) B Kuzuhara	2	6	[6]
(France) H Gaston (Brazil) T Seyboth Wild	6	4	[10]
2	(Italy) L Darderi (Italy) A Vavassori	3	6	[7]

Quarterfinals
1	(Ecuador) D Hidalgo (Colombia) C Rodríguez	6	6
(Brazil) O Luz (Brazil) M Zormann	4	3
4	(Philippines) R Gonzales (Brazil) F Romboli	4	4
(Peru) A Huertas del Pino (Peru) C Huertas del Pino	6	6
Alt	(Brazil) P Boscardin Dias (Brazil) JL Reis da Silva	6	4	[10]
3	(Spain) S Martos Gornés (New Zealand) A Sitak	3	6	[6]
(Argentina) RA Burruchaga (Argentina) GA Olivieri	w/o
(France) H Gaston (Brazil) T Seyboth Wild

Semifinals
1	(Ecuador) D Hidalgo (Colombia) C Rodríguez	6	6
(Peru) A Huertas del Pino (Peru) C Huertas del Pino	4	3
Alt	(Brazil) P Boscardin Dias (Brazil) JL Reis da Silva	6	7^{8}
(Argentina) RA Burruchaga (Argentina) GA Olivieri	3	6^{6}

Final
1	(Ecuador) D Hidalgo (Colombia) C Rodríguez	4	6	[7]
Alt	(Brazil) P Boscardin Dias (Brazil) JL Reis da Silva	6	3	[10]
