= 2027 WTA 125 tournaments =

Secondary women's tennis tournaments

Details
- Duration: 4 January – 12 December 2027
- Edition: 16th
- Tournaments: 5

Achievements (singles)

The WTA 125 tournaments are the secondary professional tennis circuit tournaments organised by the Women's Tennis Association. The 2027 calendar tentatively consists of five tournaments announced or confirmed so far through various sources. The prize money of these tournaments ranges from $115,000 up to $236,250. A maximum of 125 points are offered to the champions of these events.

== Schedule ==
=== January ===
Week of	Tournament	Champions	Runners-up	Semifinalists	Quarterfinalists
January 4	Workday Canberra International; Canberra, Australia; Hard – $236,250 – 32S/32Q/16D; Singles – Doubles	vs		vs vs	vs vs vs vs
January 4	Workday Canberra International; Canberra, Australia; Hard – $236,250 – 32S/32Q/16D; Singles – Doubles	/ vs /		vs vs	vs vs vs vs
January 25	Philippine Women's Open; Manila, Philippines; Hard – $115,000 – 32S/16Q/16D; Singles – Doubles	vs		vs vs	vs vs vs vs
January 25	Philippine Women's Open; Manila, Philippines; Hard – $115,000 – 32S/16Q/16D; Singles – Doubles	/ vs /		vs vs	vs vs vs vs

=== February ===
Week of	Tournament	Champions	Runners-up	Semifinalists	Quarterfinalists
February 1	WTA 125 Perth; Perth, Australia; Hard – $115,000 – 32S/16Q/16D; Singles – Doubles	vs		vs vs	vs vs vs vs
February 1	WTA 125 Perth; Perth, Australia; Hard – $115,000 – 32S/16Q/16D; Singles – Doubles	/ vs /		vs vs	vs vs vs vs
February 8	WTA 125 Perth; Perth, Australia; Hard – $115,000 – 32S/16Q/16D; Singles – Doubles	vs		vs vs	vs vs vs vs
February 8	WTA 125 Perth; Perth, Australia; Hard – $115,000 – 32S/16Q/16D; Singles – Doubles	/ vs /		vs vs	vs vs vs vs
February 22	Open Arena Les Sables d'Olonne; Les Sables d'Olonne, France; Hard (i) – $115,000 – 32S/16Q/16D; Singles – Doubles	vs		vs vs	vs vs vs vs
February 22	Open Arena Les Sables d'Olonne; Les Sables d'Olonne, France; Hard (i) – $115,000 – 32S/16Q/16D; Singles – Doubles	/ vs /		vs vs	vs vs vs vs

== Statistical information ==
These tables present the number of singles (S) and doubles (D) titles won by each player and each nation during the season. The players/nations are sorted by: 1) total number of titles (a doubles title won by two players representing the same nation counts as only one win for the nation); 2) a singles > doubles hierarchy; 3) alphabetical order (by family names for players).

To avoid confusion and double counting, these tables should be updated only after an event is completed.

== Points distribution ==
Event	W	F	SF	QF	R16	R32	Q	Q2	Q1
Singles	125	81	49	27	15	1	6	4	1
Doubles (16D)	125	81	49	27	1	—N/a	—N/a	—N/a	—N/a
Doubles (8D)	125	81	49	1	—N/a	—N/a	—N/a	—N/a	—N/a

== See also ==
- 2027 WTA Tour
- 2027 ITF Women's World Tennis Tour
- 2027 ATP Challenger Tour
