= 2026 Morelia Open – Singles =

Singles
- 2026 Morelia Open

Final
- Champion: (Croatia) Borna Gojo
- Runner-up: (Argentina) Juan Pablo Ficovich
- Score: 7–6^{(7–5)}, 6–2

Events
Singles	Doubles
- Morelia Open

Dmitry Popko was the defending champion but chose not to defend his title.

Borna Gojo won the title after defeating Juan Pablo Ficovich 7–6^{(7–5)}, 6–2 in the final.

== Seeds ==
1. (Australia) James Duckworth (second round)
2. (Australia) Adam Walton (first round)
3. (Australia) Tristan Schoolkate (quarterfinals)
4. (Hong Kong) Coleman Wong (first round)
5. (Japan) Shintaro Mochizuki (second round)
6. (Luxembourg) Chris Rodesch (quarterfinals, retired)
7. (China) Bu Yunchaokete (second round)
8. (Croatia) Borna Gojo (champion)

== Draw ==
Key

- Q = Qualifier
- WC = Wild card
- LL = Lucky loser
- Alt = Alternate
- ITF = ITF entry
- PR = Protected ranking
- SR = Special ranking
- SE = Special exempt
- JE = Junior exempt
- JR = Junior Accelerator Programme entrant
- CO = College Accelerator Programme entrant
- NG = Next Gen Accelerator Program entrant
- w/o = Walkover
- r = Retired
- d = Defaulted

=== Finals ===
Semifinals
8	(Croatia) Borna Gojo	6	7^{7}
(Colombia) Nicolás Mejía	4	6^{5}
(Argentina) Juan Pablo Ficovich	6	3	6
(France) Luka Pavlovic	1	6	3

Final
8	(Croatia) Borna Gojo	7^{7}	6
(Argentina) Juan Pablo Ficovich	6^{5}	2

=== Top half ===
First round
1	(Australia) J Duckworth	5	6	6
(Switzerland) M-A Hüsler	7	4	4
Alt	(Mexico) R Pacheco Méndez	6	6
Q	(United States) A Ayeni	2	4
(Kazakhstan) B Zhukayev	1	6^{4}
Q	(United States) Q Vandecasteele	6	7^{7}
(United States) M Krueger	6^{5}	4
8	(Croatia) B Gojo	7^{7}	6
4	(Hong Kong) C Wong	5	6^{2}
(Colombia) N Mejía	7	7^{7}
(United States) S Kozlov	2	2
(United States) A Martin	6	6
Q	(Australia) M Polmans	6	3	7^{7}
Q	(Argentina) F Mena	3	6	6^{5}
(United Kingdom) O Crawford	3	3
6	(Luxembourg) C Rodesch	6	6

Second round
1	(Australia) J Duckworth	6^{4}	3
Alt	(Mexico) R Pacheco Méndez	7^{7}	6
Q	(United States) Q Vandecasteele	3	7^{8}	5
8	(Croatia) B Gojo	6	6^{6}	7
(Colombia) N Mejía	6	6
(United States) A Martin	4	4
Q	(Australia) M Polmans	4	4
6	(Luxembourg) C Rodesch	6	6

Quarterfinals
Alt	(Mexico) R Pacheco Méndez	6^{3}	4
8	(Croatia) B Gojo	7^{7}	6
(Colombia) N Mejía	4
6	(Luxembourg) C Rodesch	0^{r}

Semifinals
8	(Croatia) B Gojo	6	7^{7}
(Colombia) N Mejía	4	6^{5}

=== Bottom half ===
First round
5	(Japan) S Mochizuki	3	6	6
Alt	(United States) K Smith	6	3	4
(Argentina) JP Ficovich	6	6
LL	(Brazil) M Alves	3	1
WC	(Mexico) A Hernández	4	4
(Ecuador) A Andrade	6	6
Q	(France) Robin Catry	6^{2}	4
3	(Australia) T Schoolkate	7^{7}	6
7	(China) Y Bu	7	6
LL	(Germany) M Wiskandt	5	4
(Canada) A Galarneau	7^{7}	2	6
Q	(Colombia) Miguel Tobón	6^{4}	6	3
WC	(Mexico) A Magadán	6	6
WC	(Mexico) AF Rubio Fierros	3	2
(France) L Pavlovic	6	7
2	(Australia) A Walton	3	5

Second round
5	(Japan) S Mochizuki	7^{7}	4	1
(Argentina) JP Ficovich	6^{3}	6	6
(Ecuador) A Andrade	4	0
3	(Australia) T Schoolkate	6	6
7	(China) Y Bu	6^{0}	4
(Canada) A Galarneau	7^{7}	6
WC	(Mexico) A Magadán	4	3
(France) L Pavlovic	6	6

Quarterfinals
(Argentina) JP Ficovich	6	7
3	(Australia) T Schoolkate	3	5
(Canada) A Galarneau	6^{5}	6	6^{5}
(France) L Pavlovic	7^{7}	4	7^{7}

Semifinals
(Argentina) JP Ficovich	6	3	6
(France) L Pavlovic	1	6	3
