= 2022 Challenger del Biobío – Doubles =

Doubles
- 2022 Challenger del Biobío

Final
- Champions: (Argentina) Andrea Collarini (Argentina) Renzo Olivo
- Runners-up: (Ecuador) Diego Hidalgo (Colombia) Cristian Rodríguez
- Score: 6–4, 6–4

Events
Singles	Doubles
- Challenger del Biobío

This was the first edition of the tournament.

Andrea Collarini and Renzo Olivo won the title after defeating Diego Hidalgo and Cristian Rodríguez 6–4, 6–4 in the final.

== Seeds ==
1. (Peru) Sergio Galdós / (Portugal) Gonçalo Oliveira (quarterfinals)
2. (Ecuador) Diego Hidalgo / (Colombia) Cristian Rodríguez (final)
3. (Colombia) Nicolás Barrientos / (Philippines) Ruben Gonzales (semifinals)
4. (Netherlands) Jesper de Jong / (Netherlands) Bart Stevens (quarterfinals)

== Draw ==
Key

- Q = Qualifier
- WC = Wild card
- LL = Lucky loser
- Alt = Alternate
- ITF = ITF entry
- PR = Protected ranking
- SR = Special ranking
- SE = Special exempt
- JE = Junior exempt
- JR = Junior Accelerator Programme entrant
- CO = College Accelerator Programme entrant
- NG = Next Gen Accelerator Program entrant
- w/o = Walkover
- r = Retired
- d = Defaulted

First round
1	(Peru) S Galdós (Portugal) G Oliveira	2	6	[10]
Alt	(Israel) Y Oliel (Switzerland) D Wenger	6	4	[7]
WC	(Chile) Nicolás Bruna (Chile) Amador Salazar	1	0
(Argentina) A Collarini (Argentina) R Olivo	6	6
3	(Colombia) N Barrientos (Philippines) R Gonzales	6	6
(Argentina) N Kicker (Peru) A Merino	2	3
(Argentina) TM Etcheverry (Argentina) TA Tirante	3	3
(Brazil) D Dutra da Silva (Brazil) M Pucinelli de Almeida	6	6
(Argentina) GA Olivieri (Argentina) C Ugo Carabelli	7^{7}	6
(Bolivia) B Arias (Bolivia) F Zeballos	6^{5}	0
WC	(Chile) Alejandro Bancalari (Chile) Nicolás Villalón	2	1
4	(Netherlands) J de Jong (Netherlands) B Stevens	6	6
(Argentina) H Casanova (Argentina) S Rodríguez Taverna	0	4
(Canada) S Diez (Ecuador) R Quiroz	6	6
(France) C Denolly (Switzerland) J Nikles	3	3
2	(Ecuador) D Hidalgo (Colombia) C Rodríguez	6	6

Quarterfinals
1	(Peru) S Galdós (Portugal) G Oliveira	1	3
(Argentina) A Collarini (Argentina) R Olivo	6	6
3	(Colombia) N Barrientos (Philippines) R Gonzales	7^{7}	6
(Brazil) D Dutra da Silva (Brazil) M Pucinelli de Almeida	6^{1}	2
(Argentina) GA Olivieri (Argentina) C Ugo Carabelli	7	7
4	(Netherlands) J de Jong (Netherlands) B Stevens	5	5
(Canada) S Diez (Ecuador) R Quiroz	3	4
2	(Ecuador) D Hidalgo (Colombia) C Rodríguez	6	6

Semifinals
(Argentina) A Collarini (Argentina) R Olivo	6	6
3	(Colombia) N Barrientos (Philippines) R Gonzales	4	2
(Argentina) GA Olivieri (Argentina) C Ugo Carabelli	6^{5}	1
2	(Ecuador) D Hidalgo (Colombia) C Rodríguez	7^{7}	6

Final
(Argentina) A Collarini (Argentina) R Olivo	6	6
2	(Ecuador) D Hidalgo (Colombia) C Rodríguez	4	4
