= 2022 Challenger del Biobío – Singles =

Singles
- 2022 Challenger del Biobío

Final
- Champion: (Argentina) Tomás Martín Etcheverry
- Runner-up: (Bolivia) Hugo Dellien
- Score: 6–3, 6–2

Events
Singles	Doubles
- Challenger del Biobío

This was the first edition of the tournament.

Tomás Martín Etcheverry won the title after defeating Hugo Dellien 6–3, 6–2 in the final.

== Seeds ==
1. (Bolivia) Hugo Dellien (final)
2. (Peru) Juan Pablo Varillas (quarterfinals)
3. (Argentina) Tomás Martín Etcheverry (champion)
4. (Chile) Nicolás Jarry (second round)
5. (Chile) Tomás Barrios Vera (semifinals)
6. (Czech Republic) Vít Kopřiva (first round)
7. (Argentina) Camilo Ugo Carabelli (quarterfinals)
8. (Argentina) Facundo Mena (second round)

== Draw ==
Key

- Q = Qualifier
- WC = Wild card
- LL = Lucky loser
- Alt = Alternate
- ITF = ITF entry
- PR = Protected ranking
- SR = Special ranking
- SE = Special exempt
- JE = Junior exempt
- JR = Junior Accelerator Programme entrant
- CO = College Accelerator Programme entrant
- NG = Next Gen Accelerator Program entrant
- w/o = Walkover
- r = Retired
- d = Defaulted

=== Finals ===
Semifinals
1	(Bolivia) Hugo Dellien	6	6
5	(Chile) Tomás Barrios Vera	3	0
3	(Argentina) Tomás Martín Etcheverry	2	6	6
(Argentina) Renzo Olivo	6	2	4

Final
1	(Bolivia) Hugo Dellien	3	2
3	(Argentina) Tomás Martín Etcheverry	6	6

=== Top half ===
First round
1	(Bolivia) H Dellien	6	6
Q	(Brazil) D Dutra da Silva	1	0
Alt	(United Kingdom) P Jubb	7	6
Alt	(Argentina) GA Olivieri	5	3
(Argentina) TA Tirante	7^{7}	6
WC	(Chile) Daniel Antonio Núñez	6^{5}	3
Alt	(France) E Furness	6	6
6	(Czech Republic) V Kopřiva	2	1
4	(Chile) N Jarry	6	6
Q	(Argentina) G Villanueva	2	1
(Argentina) P Cachin	3	1^{r}
(Brazil) M Pucinelli de Almeida	6	3
Q	(France) C Denolly	6	6
(Portugal) G Oliveira	0	2
Q	(Argentina) Facundo Juárez	6	5	3
5	(Chile) T Barrios Vera	3	7	6

Second round
1	(Bolivia) H Dellien	6	2
Alt	(United Kingdom) P Jubb	1	0^{r}
(Argentina) TA Tirante	7^{7}	6
Alt	(France) E Furness	6^{4}	0
4	(Chile) N Jarry	4	6	3
(Brazil) M Pucinelli de Almeida	6	3	6
Q	(France) C Denolly	2	3
5	(Chile) T Barrios Vera	6	6

Quarterfinals
1	(Bolivia) H Dellien	6	6
(Argentina) TA Tirante	0	3
(Brazil) M Pucinelli de Almeida	2	6	1
5	(Chile) T Barrios Vera	6	3	6

Semifinals
1	(Bolivia) H Dellien	6	6
5	(Chile) T Barrios Vera	3	0

=== Bottom half ===
First round
7	(Argentina) C Ugo Carabelli	3	6	7
(Austria) G Melzer	6	3	5
Q	(Argentina) JB Torres	4	2
(Canada) S Diez	6	6
WC	(Peru) G Bueno	4	4
(Chile) G Lama	6	6
WC	(Chile) D Fernández Flores	1	7	2
3	(Argentina) TM Etcheverry	6	5	6
8	(Argentina) F Mena	6	0
Q	(Argentina) H Casanova	1	1^{r}
(Netherlands) J de Jong	6	6^{0}	2
(Argentina) R Olivo	1	7^{7}	6
(Argentina) A Collarini	6	6
(Argentina) N Kicker	4	3
(Argentina) S Rodríguez Taverna	6^{2}	6	3
2	(Peru) JP Varillas	7^{7}	4	6

Second round
7	(Argentina) C Ugo Carabelli	6	6
(Canada) S Diez	1	2
(Chile) G Lama	3	6^{1}
3	(Argentina) TM Etcheverry	6	7^{7}
8	(Argentina) F Mena	3	1
(Argentina) R Olivo	6	6
(Argentina) A Collarini	4	2
2	(Peru) JP Varillas	6	6

Quarterfinals
7	(Argentina) C Ugo Carabelli	6^{9}	6	5
3	(Argentina) TM Etcheverry	7^{11}	4	7
(Argentina) R Olivo	7^{7}	2	6
2	(Peru) JP Varillas	6^{2}	6	2

Semifinals
3	(Argentina) TM Etcheverry	2	6	6
(Argentina) R Olivo	6	2	4
