= 2025 Costa do Sauípe Open – Doubles =

Doubles
- 2025 Costa do Sauípe Open

Final
- Champions: (Brazil) Luís Miguel (Brazil) Eduardo Ribeiro
- Runners-up: (Ecuador) Gonzalo Escobar (Mexico) Miguel Ángel Reyes-Varela
- Score: 7–6^{(7–4)}, 4–6, [10–5]

Events
Singles	Doubles
- Costa do Sauípe Open

This was the first edition of the tournament.

Luís Miguel and Eduardo Ribeiro won the title after defeating Gonzalo Escobar and Miguel Ángel Reyes-Varela 7–6^{(7–4)}, 4–6, [10–5] in the final.

== Seeds ==
1. (Brazil) Marcelo Demoliner / (Brazil) Orlando Luz (quarterfinals)
2. (Ecuador) Gonzalo Escobar / (Mexico) Miguel Ángel Reyes-Varela (final)
3. (Argentina) Federico Agustín Gómez / (Venezuela) Luis David Martínez (first round)
4. (Czech Republic) Zdeněk Kolář / (Poland) Piotr Matuszewski (first round)

== Draw ==
Key

- Q = Qualifier
- WC = Wild card
- LL = Lucky loser
- Alt = Alternate
- ITF = ITF entry
- PR = Protected ranking
- SR = Special ranking
- SE = Special exempt
- JE = Junior exempt
- JR = Junior Accelerator Programme entrant
- CO = College Accelerator Programme entrant
- NG = Next Gen Accelerator Program entrant
- w/o = Walkover
- r = Retired
- d = Defaulted

=== Draw ===
First round
1	(Brazil) M Demoliner (Brazil) O Luz	w/o
Alt	(Brazil) M Pucinelli de Almeida (Brazil) PA Saraiva dos Santos
3	(Argentina) FA Gómez (Venezuela) LD Martínez	4	4
(Argentina) G Durán (Argentina) M Kestelboim	6	6
(Brazil) L Britto (Brazil) M Zormann	5	6	[10]
(Colombia) C Rodríguez (Bolivia) F Zeballos	7	4	[8]
(Uruguay) I Carou (Argentina) JM Cerúndolo	6	6
(Argentina) A Collarini (Argentina) TA Tirante	3	3
WC	(Brazil) M Alves (Brazil) P Boscardin Dias	7^{8}	6
4	(Czech Republic) Z Kolář (Poland) P Matuszewski	6^{6}	4

Quarterfinals
1	(Brazil) M Demoliner (Brazil) O Luz	7^{7}	6^{2}	[4]
WC	(Brazil) L Miguel (Brazil) E Ribeiro	6^{5}	7^{7}	[10]
(Argentina) G Durán (Argentina) M Kestelboim	6	4	[6]
(Brazil) L Britto (Brazil) M Zormann	4	6	[10]
(Uruguay) I Carou (Argentina) JM Cerúndolo	2	6	[7]
WC	(Brazil) M Alves (Brazil) P Boscardin Dias	6	2	[10]
(Bolivia) B Arias (Denmark) J Ingildsen	4	0
2	(Ecuador) G Escobar (Mexico) M Reyes-Varela	6	6

Semifinals
WC	(Brazil) L Miguel (Brazil) E Ribeiro	6	6
(Brazil) L Britto (Brazil) M Zormann	0	4
WC	(Brazil) M Alves (Brazil) P Boscardin Dias	2	1
2	(Ecuador) G Escobar (Mexico) M Reyes-Varela	6	6

Final
WC	(Brazil) L Miguel (Brazil) E Ribeiro	7^{7}	4	[10]
2	(Ecuador) G Escobar (Mexico) M Reyes-Varela	6^{4}	6	[5]
