= 2023 Challenger de Santiago – Singles =

Singles
- 2023 Challenger de Santiago

Final
- Champion: (Bolivia) Hugo Dellien
- Runner-up: (Brazil) Thiago Seyboth Wild
- Score: 3–6, 6–3, 6–3

Events
Singles	Doubles
← 2022 ·	Challenger de Santiago	· 2024 →

Hugo Dellien was the defending champion and successfully defended his title after defeating Thiago Seyboth Wild 3–6, 6–3, 6–3 in the final.

== Seeds ==
1. (Chile) Nicolás Jarry (withdrew)
2. (Italy) Marco Cecchinato (first round)
3. (Argentina) Facundo Bagnis (quarterfinals)
4. (Bolivia) Hugo Dellien (champion)
5. (Argentina) Juan Manuel Cerúndolo (first round)
6. (Argentina) Camilo Ugo Carabelli (second round)
7. (Italy) Franco Agamenone (quarterfinals)
8. (Argentina) Facundo Díaz Acosta (semifinals)

== Draw ==
=== Key ===
- Q = Qualifier
- WC = Wild card
- LL = Lucky loser
- Alt = Alternate
- SE = Special exempt
- PR = Protected ranking
- ITF = ITF entry
- JE = Junior exempt
- w/o = Walkover
- r = Retired
- d = Defaulted
- SR = Special ranking

=== Finals ===
Semifinals
8	(Argentina) Facundo Díaz Acosta	6^{2}	3
Q	(Brazil) Thiago Seyboth Wild	7^{7}	6
4	(Bolivia) Hugo Dellien	6	6
(Argentina) Genaro Alberto Olivieri	2	2

Final
Q	(Brazil) Thiago Seyboth Wild	6	3	3
4	(Bolivia) Hugo Dellien	3	6	6

=== Top half ===
First round
Q	(Brazil) D Dutra da Silva	6	6^{4}	2^{r}
LL	(Brazil) JL Reis da Silva	4	7^{7}	4
(Italy) L Darderi	7^{7}	7^{7}
WC	(Chile) G Lama	6^{5}	6^{1}
(Argentina) F Delbonis	4	6	3
Q	(France) H Gaston	6	4	6
(Argentina) N Kicker	3	3
8	(Argentina) F Díaz Acosta	6	6
3	(Argentina) F Bagnis	6	6
(United States) B Kuzuhara	0	1
LL	(Argentina) G Villanueva	0	1
(Argentina) H Casanova	6	6
(Chile) T Barrios Vera	5	6	1
(Peru) G Bueno	7	2	6
Q	(Brazil) T Seyboth Wild	6	6
5	(Argentina) JM Cerúndolo	3	4

Second round
LL	(Brazil) JL Reis da Silva	6	3	5
(Italy) L Darderi	4	6	7
Q	(France) H Gaston	5	3
8	(Argentina) F Díaz Acosta	7	6
3	(Argentina) F Bagnis	6	6
(Argentina) H Casanova	2	3
(Peru) G Bueno	2	6^{5}
Q	(Brazil) T Seyboth Wild	6	7^{7}

Quarterfinals
(Italy) L Darderi	0	5
8	(Argentina) F Díaz Acosta	6	7
3	(Argentina) F Bagnis	6	1	0
Q	(Brazil) T Seyboth Wild	3	6	6

Semifinals
8	(Argentina) F Díaz Acosta	6^{2}	3
Q	(Brazil) T Seyboth Wild	7^{7}	6

=== Bottom half ===
First round
7	(Italy) F Agamenone	6	6^{5}	6
Q	(Argentina) JB Torres	3	7^{7}	3
(Argentina) M Navone	0	4
(Argentina) RA Burruchaga	6	6
(Italy) A Vavassori	6	6
(Argentina) TA Tirante	4	4
(Italy) A Pellegrino	3	6	2
4	(Bolivia) H Dellien	6	4	6
6	(Argentina) C Ugo Carabelli	6	6
WC	(Chile) Nicolás Villalón	1	0
Q	(Italy) F Gaio	6^{5}	6	6
(Argentina) R Olivo	7^{7}	4	1
(Argentina) GA Olivieri	7^{8}	6
Q	(Spain) Á López San Martín	6^{6}	4
(Italy) R Bonadio	7^{7}	6
2	(Italy) M Cecchinato	6^{4}	2

Second round
7	(Italy) F Agamenone	3	6	6
(Argentina) RA Burruchaga	6	2	4
(Italy) A Vavassori	5	6	6^{2}
4	(Bolivia) H Dellien	7	4	7^{7}
6	(Argentina) C Ugo Carabelli	4	7	4
Q	(Italy) F Gaio	6	5	6
(Argentina) GA Olivieri	7^{8}	6
(Italy) R Bonadio	6^{6}	2

Quarterfinals
7	(Italy) F Agamenone	7^{7}	6^{3}	6^{5}
4	(Bolivia) H Dellien	6^{5}	7^{7}	7^{7}
Q	(Italy) F Gaio	3	3
(Argentina) GA Olivieri	6	6

Semifinals
4	(Bolivia) H Dellien	6	6
(Argentina) GA Olivieri	2	2
