= ATP Challenger Tour 125 =

Tennis tournament

The ATP Challenger 125 tournaments are the second highest tier of annual men's tennis tournaments on the ATP Challenger Tour, with 125 ranking points awarded to each singles champion. They were previously the highest tier of Challenger tournaments before the introduction of ATP Challenger Tour 175 tournaments in 2023.

As of the 2027 season, the series included 40 tournaments, with some added and others upgraded or downgraded since the COVID-19 pandemic.

== Events ==
Tournament	Officially known as	City	Country	Surface
Australia	Workday Canberra International	Canberra	Australia	Hard
Quimper	Open Quimper Bretagne Occidentale	Quimper	France	Hard (i)
Trofeo Faip–Perrel (2027-)	Trofeo Faip–Perrel - Internazionali di Bergamo	Bergamo	Italy	Hard (i)
Lille	Play In Challenger	Lille	France	Hard (i)
Argentina	Rosario Challenger	Rosario	Argentina	Clay
Bahrain	Bahrain Ministry of Interior Tennis Challenger	Manama	Bahrain	Hard
Pau	Teréga Open Pau–Pyrénées	Pau	France	Hard (i)
India	Bengaluru Open	Bangalore	India	Hard
Morelia	Morelia Open	Morelia	Mexico	Hard
Naples	Napoli Tennis Cup	Naples	Italy	Clay
Monza	Monza Open	Monza	Italy	Clay
Mexico City	Mexico City Open	Mexico City	Mexico	Clay
Oeiras	Open de Oeiras	Oeiras	Portugal	Clay
Busan	Busan Open	Busan	South Korea	Hard
Birmingham	Lexus Birmingham Open	Birmingham	United Kingdom	Grass
Ilkley	Lexus Ilkley Open	Ilkley	United Kingdom	Grass
Nottingham	Lexus Nottingham Open	Nottingham	United Kingdom	Grass
Newport	Hall of Fame Open	Newport, RI	United States	Grass
Perugia	Internazionali di Tennis Città di Perugia	Perugia	Italy	Clay
Sassuolo	Emilia-Romagna Tennis Cup	Sassuolo	Italy	Clay
Braunschweig	Brawo Open	Braunschweig	Germany	Clay
San Marino	San Marino Open	San Marino	San Marino	Clay
Zug	Dialectic Zug Open	Zug	Switzerland	Clay
Bloomfield Hills	Cranbrook Tennis Classic	Bloomfield Hills, MI	United States	Hard
Vancouver	Odlum Brown VanOpen	Vancouver	Canada	Hard
Cancún	Europcar Cancún Country Open	Cancún	Mexico	Hard
Québec City	Québec National Bank Challenger	Quebec City	Canada	Hard
Seville	Copa Sevilla	Seville	Spain	Clay
Genoa	AON Open Challenger	Genoa	Italy	Clay
Szczecin	Invest in Szczecin Open	Szczecin	Poland	Clay
Tiburon	Tiburon Challenger by Raymond James	Tiburon, CA	United States	Hard
Saint-Tropez	Saint-Tropez Open	Saint-Tropez	France	Hard
Porto	Eupago Porto Open	Porto	Portugal	Hard
China	Jinan Open	Jinan	China	Hard
Olbia	Olbia Challenger	Olbia	Italy	Hard
Seoul	Seoul Open	Seoul	South Korea	Hard
Brazil	Costa do Sauípe Open	Sauipe	Brazil	Clay
Orléans	Orléans Open	Orléans	France	Hard (i)
Helsinki	HPP Open	Helsinki	Finland	Hard (i)
Metz	Open Metz	Metz	France	Hard (i)

== ATP Points ==
Event	W	F	SF	QF	Round of 16	Round of 32	Q	Q2	Q1
Men's singles	125	64	35	16	8	0	5	3	0
Men's doubles	125	75	45	25	0	—N/a	—N/a	—N/a	—N/a

== Singles champions ==
	2019	2020	2021	2022	2023	2024	2025	2026
Canberra	Challenger 80	(Germany) Kohlschreiber	Cancelled	Cancelled	Challenger 100			
Istanbul	Challenger 90	Challenger 100	(France) Rinderknech	Challenger 80	Challenger 75			
Newport Beach	(United States) Fritz	(United States) Kwiatkowski	Cancelled	Not an event				
Quimper	Challenger 80		Challenger 100	Challenger 80	(France) Barrère			
Ottignies	Not an event				(Belgium) Goffin			
Manama	Not an event		Challenger 80	Not an event	(Australia) Kokkinakis			
Bangalore	Not an event	(Australia) Duckworth	Cancelled	Challenger 80	Challenger 100			
Biella 2	Not an event		(South Korea) Kwon	Not an event				
Nur-Sultan 2	Challenger 80	Abandoned	(Czech Republic) Macháč	Not an event				
Indian Wells	(United Kingdom) Edmund	(United States) Johnson	Cancelled	Not an event				
Phoenix	(Italy) Berrettini	Cancelled	Cancelled	(United States) Kudla	Challenger 175			
Marbella	Challenger 80			(Spain) Munar	Not an event			
Monterrey	(Kazakhstan) Bublik	Challenger 100	Cancelled due to the COVID-19 pandemic	Challenger 100	(Portugal) Borges			
Mexico City	Not an event	Cancelled due to the COVID-19 pandemic	Cancelled due to the COVID-19 pandemic	(Switzerland) Hüsler	(Germany) Koepfer			
Taipei	(Austria) Novak	Cancelled due to the COVID-19 pandemic	Cancelled due to the COVID-19 pandemic	Not an event				
Anning	(United Kingdom) Clarke	Cancelled due to the COVID-19 pandemic	Cancelled due to the COVID-19 pandemic	Not an event				
Pau	Challenger 90	Challenger 100			(France) Van Assche			
Sanremo	Not an event			Challenger 80	(France) Van Assche			
Belgrade	Not an event		(Spain) Carballés Baena	Not an event				
Sarasota	Challenger 100	Cancelled	Cancelled	Challenger 100	(Germany) Altmaier			
Aix-en-Provence	(Uruguay) Cuevas	(Germany) Otte	(Spain) Taberner	Challenger 100	Challenger 175			
Bordeaux	Challenger 110	Cancelled	Cancelled	(Australia) Popyrin	Challenger 175			
Busan	(Lithuania) Berankis	Cancelled	Cancelled	(Poland) Majchrzak	(Australia) Vukic			
Oeiras 3	Not an event		(Spain) Alcaraz	Challenger 80	(Hungary) Piros			
Seoul	Challenger 100	Cancelled	Cancelled	Challenger 110	(China) Yunchaokete			
Forlì	Not an event	Challenger 100	Challenger 80	(Italy) Musetti	Not an event			
Heilbronn	Challenger 100	Cancelled	Challenger 100		(Italy) Arnaldi			
Surbiton	(United Kingdom) Evans	Cancelled	Cancelled	(Australia) Thompson	(United Kingdom) Murray			
Nottingham	(United Kingdom) Evans	Cancelled	(United States) Tiafoe	(United Kingdom) Evans	(United Kingdom) Murray			
Perugia	Challenger 80	Cancelled	Challenger 80	(Spain) Munar	(Hungary) Marozsán			
Ilkley/Nottingham 2	(Germany) Koepfer	Cancelled	(Australia) Bolt	(Belgium) Bergs	(Australia) Kubler			
Parma	Challenger 80	(United States) Tiafoe	ATP Tour 250	(Croatia) Ćorić	(France) Müller			
Anif/Salzburg	Not an event		(Argentina) Bagnis	(Brazil) Monteiro	(Austria) Ofner			
Braunschweig	Challenger 90	Cancelled	Challenger 90	(Germany) Struff	(Italy) Agamenone			
Zug	Not an event			(Switzerland) Stricker	(France) Rinderknech			
Porto	Not an event		Challenger 80		(Italy) Nardi			
San Marino	Not an event		Challenger 90		(Spain) Munar			
Santo Domingo	(Peru) Varillas	Cancelled	Cancelled	(Argentina) Cachin	(Argentina) Olivieri			
Vancouver	Challenger 100	Cancelled	Cancelled	(France) Lestienne	Not an event			
Stanford	Not an event				(France) Lestienne			
Prague	Challenger 80	(Switzerland) Wawrinka	Challenger 80		Challenger 75			
Prague 2	Not an event	(Russia) Karatsev	Challenger 50					
Ostrava	Challenger 80	(Russia) Karatsev	Challenger 80		Challenger 75			
Prostějov	Challenger 100	(Poland) Majchrzak	Challenger 100					
New Haven	(United States) Paul	Cancelled	Cancelled	Not an event				
Jinan	(China) Zhang	Cancelled	Cancelled	Not an event				
Genoa	(Italy) Sonego	Cancelled	Cancelled	(Brazil) Monteiro	(Brazil) Seyboth Wild			
Seville	Challenger 90	Cancelled	Challenger 90		(Spain) Carballés Baena			
Szczecin	(Slovakia) Kovalík	Cancelled	(Czech Republic) Kolář	(France) Moutet	(Argentina) Coria			
Kaohsiung	(Australia) Millman	Cancelled	Cancelled	Not an event				
Bad Waltersdorf	Not an event				(Italy) Pellegrino			
Saint-Tropez	Not an event		Challenger 80	Challenger 100	(France) Lestienne			
Orléans	(Sweden) Ymer	Cancelled	(Switzerland) Laaksonen	(France) Barrère	(Czech Republic) Macháč			
Bogotá	Not an event				(Argentina) Tirante			
Parma 2	Not an event			(Kazakhstan) Skatov	Not an event			
Bratislava	Challenger 110	Challenger 80	Challenger 90		(Canada) Diallo			
Málaga	Not an event			Challenger 80	(France) Blanchet			
Olbia	Not an event				(France) Jacquet			
Ningbo	(Japan) Uchiyama	Cancelled	Cancelled	Not an event				
Houston	(United States) Giron	Cancelled	Cancelled	Not an event				
Helsinki	Challenger 80	Cancelled	Challenger 80	Challenger 90	(France) Moutet			

== Statistics ==
=== Most titles ===
Rank	Player	Titles
1	(United Kingdom) Dan Evans	3
1	(Spain) Jaume Munar	3
1	(France) Constant Lestienne	3
4	(Russia) Aslan Karatsev	2
4	(United States) Frances Tiafoe	2
4	(Brazil) Thiago Monteiro	2
4	(Poland) Kamil Majchrzak	2
4	(France) Grégoire Barrère	2
4	(Germany) Dominik Koepfer	2
4	(France) Luca Van Assche	2
4	(United Kingdom) Andy Murray	2
4	(France) Arthur Rinderknech	2
4	(Spain) Roberto Carballés Baena	2
4	(Czech Republic) Tomáš Macháč	2

== See also ==
- ATP Challenger Tour
- ATP Challenger Tour 175
- ATP Challenger Tour Finals
- ATP Tour
- WTA 125 tournaments
