= 2025 Morelia Open =

- Date: 24–30 March
- Edition: 1st
- Surface: Hard
- Location: Morelia, Mexico

Champions

Singles
- (Kazakhstan) Dmitry Popko

Doubles
- (Ecuador) Gonzalo Escobar / (Ecuador) Diego Hidalgo
- Morelia Open

The 2025 Morelia Open was a professional men's tennis tournament played on hardcourts. It was the first edition of the tournament and part of the 2025 ATP Challenger Tour. It took place in Morelia, Mexico from 24 to 30 March 2025.

== Champions ==
=== Singles ===
- (Kazakhstan) Dmitry Popko def. (Australia) James Duckworth 1–6, 6–2, 6–4.

=== Doubles ===
- (Ecuador) Gonzalo Escobar / (Ecuador) Diego Hidalgo def. (Switzerland) Marc-Andrea Hüsler / (Italy) Stefano Napolitano 6–4, 4–6, [10–3].

== Singles main-draw entrants ==
=== Seeds ===
Country	Player	Rank^{1}	Seed
AUS	James Duckworth	95	1
USA	Christopher Eubanks	104	2
USA	Brandon Holt	116	3
ARG	Thiago Agustín Tirante	117	4
FRA	Adrian Mannarino	145	5
JPN	Shintaro Mochizuki	155	6
CAN	Alexis Galarneau	159	7
ARG	Juan Pablo Ficovich	162	8

- Rankings are as of 17 March 2025.

=== Other entrants ===
The following players received wildcards into the singles main draw:

- (Mexico) Alex Hernández
- (Mexico) Rodrigo Pacheco Méndez
- (Mexico) Alan Fernando Rubio Fierros

The following players received entry into the singles main draw as alternates:

- (United States) Murphy Cassone
- (Kazakhstan) Dmitry Popko
- (Australia) Bernard Tomic
- (Kazakhstan) Beibit Zhukayev

The following players received entry from the qualifying draw:

- (Germany) Elmar Ejupovic
- (Italy) Stefano Napolitano
- (Austria) Maximilian Neuchrist
- (New Zealand) Kiranpal Pannu
- (United States) Alfredo Perez
- (United States) Tyler Zink
