= 2026 Costa do Sauípe Open =

- Date: 2 – 8 November
- Edition: 2nd
- Surface: Clay
- Location: Sauipe, Brazil

Champions

Singles
- (Argentina) Camilo Ugo Carabelli

Doubles
- (Czech Republic) Zdeněk Kolář / (Argentina) Santiago Rodríguez Taverna
- Costa do Sauípe Open

The 2026 Costa do Sauípe Open was a professional tennis tournament played on clay courts. It was the second edition of the tournament which was part of the 2026 ATP Challenger Tour. It took place in Sauipe, Brazil between 2 and 8 November 2026.

== Singles main-draw entrants ==
=== Seeds ===
Country	Player	Rank^{1}	Seed
ARG	Facundo Díaz Acosta	70	1
ARG	Camilo Ugo Carabelli	75	2
POR	Henrique Rocha	100	3
BRA	Thiago Seyboth Wild	111	4
BRA	Gustavo Heide	113	5
~~BOL~~	~~Hugo Dellien~~	~~119~~	~~6~~
ARG	Francisco Comesaña	128	7
DEN	Elmer Møller	150	8

- ^{1} Rankings are as of 26 October 2026.

=== Other entrants ===
The following players received wildcards into the singles main draw:

- (Brazil) Lucas Andrade da Silva
- (Brazil) Felipe Meligeni Alves
- (Brazil) Guto Miguel

The following player received entry into the singles main draw as an alternate:

- (Brazil) Igor Marcondes

The following players received entry from the qualifying draw:

- (Colombia) Daniel Elahi Galán
- (Brazil) Luís Felipe Miguel
- (Austria) Filip Misolic
- (Argentina) Santiago Rodríguez Taverna
- (Brazil) Leonardo Storck França
- (Brazil) Rafael Tosetto

The following player received entry as a lucky loser:

- (Brazil) Eduardo Ribeiro

== Champions ==
=== Singles ===
- (Argentina) Camilo Ugo Carabelli def. (Brazil) Thiago Seyboth Wild 6–2, 7–5.

=== Doubles ===
- (Czech Republic) Zdeněk Kolář / (Argentina) Santiago Rodríguez Taverna def. (Ecuador) Diego Hidalgo / (Argentina) Andrés Molteni 6–4, 6–4.
