= 2022 Challenger del Biobío =

- Date: 14–20 March
- Edition: 1st
- Surface: Clay
- Location: Concepción, Chile

Champions

Singles
- (Argentina) Tomás Martín Etcheverry

Doubles
- (Argentina) Andrea Collarini / (Argentina) Renzo Olivo
Challenger del Biobío	· 2023 →

The 2022 Challenger del Biobío was a professional tennis tournament played on clay courts. It was the first edition of the tournament which was part of the 2022 ATP Challenger Tour. It took place in Concepción, Chile between 14 and 20 March 2022.

== Singles main draw entrants ==
=== Seeds ===
Country	Player	Rank^{1}	Seed
BOL	Hugo Dellien	101	1
PER	Juan Pablo Varillas	117	2
ARG	Tomás Martín Etcheverry	123	3
CHI	Nicolás Jarry	142	4
CHI	Tomás Barrios Vera	145	5
CZE	Vít Kopřiva	165	6
ARG	Camilo Ugo Carabelli	175	7
ARG	Facundo Mena	183	8

- ^{1} Rankings are as of 7 March 2022.

=== Other entrants ===
The following players received wildcards into the singles main draw:

- (Peru) Gonzalo Bueno
- (Chile) Diego Fernández Flores
- (Chile) Daniel Antonio Núñez

The following players received entry into the singles main draw as alternates:

- (France) Evan Furness
- (United Kingdom) Paul Jubb
- (Argentina) Genaro Alberto Olivieri

The following players received entry from the qualifying draw:

- (Argentina) Hernán Casanova
- (France) Corentin Denolly
- (Brazil) Daniel Dutra da Silva
- (Argentina) Facundo Juárez
- (Argentina) Juan Bautista Torres
- (Argentina) Gonzalo Villanueva

== Champions ==
=== Singles ===
- (Argentina) Tomás Martín Etcheverry def. (Bolivia) Hugo Dellien 6–3, 6–2.

=== Doubles ===
- (Argentina) Andrea Collarini / (Argentina) Renzo Olivo def. (Ecuador) Diego Hidalgo / (Colombia) Cristian Rodríguez 6–4, 6–4.
