= 2027 ATP Challenger Tour =

Secondary tennis circuit season

Details
- Duration: 4 January –
- Edition: 50th (19th under this name)
- Tournaments: 22
- Categories: Challenger 175 (0); Challenger 125 (5); Challenger 100 (1); Challenger 75 (10); Challenger 50 (6)

Achievements (singles)

The Association of Tennis Professionals (ATP) Challenger Tour in 2027 is the secondary professional tennis circuit organized by the ATP. The 2027 ATP Challenger Tour calendar comprises 22 tournaments (as of 1 February 2027), with prize money ranging from $63,000 up to $300,000. It is the 50th edition of Challenger tournaments cycle, and 19th under the name of Challenger Tour.

== Schedule ==
This is the complete schedule of events on the 2027 calendar, with player progression documented from the quarterfinals stage.

=== January ===
Week of	Tournament	Champions	Runners-up	Semifinalists	Quarterfinalists
January 4	Bengaluru Open; Bengaluru, India; Hard – Challenger 125 – 32S/24Q/16D; Singles – Doubles	vs		vs vs	vs vs vs vs
January 4	Bengaluru Open; Bengaluru, India; Hard – Challenger 125 – 32S/24Q/16D; Singles – Doubles	/ vs /		vs vs	vs vs vs vs
January 4	Canberra Tennis International; Canberra, Australia; Hard – Challenger 125 – 32S/24Q/16D; Singles – Doubles	vs		vs vs	vs vs vs vs
January 4	Canberra Tennis International; Canberra, Australia; Hard – Challenger 125 – 32S/24Q/16D; Singles – Doubles	/ vs /		vs vs	vs vs vs vs
January 4	BNC Tennis Open; Nouméa, New Caledonia; Hard – Challenger 75 – 32S/24Q/16D; Singles – Doubles	vs		vs vs	vs vs vs vs
January 4	BNC Tennis Open; Nouméa, New Caledonia; Hard – Challenger 75 – 32S/24Q/16D; Singles – Doubles	/ vs /		vs vs	vs vs vs vs
January 4	Challenger del Biobío; Los Ángeles, Chile; Clay – Challenger 50 – 32S/24Q/16D; Singles – Doubles	vs		vs vs	vs vs vs vs
January 4	Challenger del Biobío; Los Ángeles, Chile; Clay – Challenger 50 – 32S/24Q/16D; Singles – Doubles	/ vs /		vs vs	vs vs vs vs
January 4	Lexus Nottingham Challenger; Nottingham, United Kingdom; Hard (i) – Challenger 50 – 32S/24Q/16D; Singles – Doubles	vs		vs vs	vs vs vs vs
January 4	Lexus Nottingham Challenger; Nottingham, United Kingdom; Hard (i) – Challenger 50 – 32S/24Q/16D; Singles – Doubles	/ vs /		vs vs	vs vs vs vs
January 11	Glasgow Challenger; Glasgow, United Kingdom; Hard (i) – Challenger 75 – 32S/24Q/16D; Singles – Doubles	vs		vs vs	vs vs vs vs
January 11	Glasgow Challenger; Glasgow, United Kingdom; Hard (i) – Challenger 75 – 32S/24Q/16D; Singles – Doubles	/ vs /		vs vs	vs vs vs vs
January 11	Baton Rouge Challenger; Baton Rouge, United States; Hard (i) – Challenger 50 – 32S/24Q/16D; Singles – Doubles	vs		vs vs	vs vs vs vs
January 11	Baton Rouge Challenger; Baton Rouge, United States; Hard (i) – Challenger 50 – 32S/24Q/16D; Singles – Doubles	/ vs /		vs vs	vs vs vs vs
January 11	Challenger de Tigre; Tigre, Argentina; Clay – Challenger 50 – 32S/24Q/16D; Singles – Doubles	vs		vs vs	vs vs vs vs
January 11	Challenger de Tigre; Tigre, Argentina; Clay – Challenger 50 – 32S/24Q/16D; Singles – Doubles	/ vs /		vs vs	vs vs vs vs
January 18	Itajaí Open; Itajaí, Brazil; Clay – Challenger 75 – 32S/24Q/16D; Singles – Doubles	vs		vs vs	vs vs vs vs
January 18	Itajaí Open; Itajaí, Brazil; Clay – Challenger 75 – 32S/24Q/16D; Singles – Doubles	/ vs /		vs vs	vs vs vs vs
January 18	All In Open; Lyon, France; Hard (i) – Challenger 75 – 32S/24Q/16D; Singles – Doubles	vs		vs vs	vs vs vs vs
January 18	All In Open; Lyon, France; Hard (i) – Challenger 75 – 32S/24Q/16D; Singles – Doubles	/ vs /		vs vs	vs vs vs vs
January 18	Koblenz Open; Koblenz, Germany; Hard (i) – Challenger 75 – 32S/24Q/16D; Singles – Doubles	vs		vs vs	vs vs vs vs
January 18	Koblenz Open; Koblenz, Germany; Hard (i) – Challenger 75 – 32S/24Q/16D; Singles – Doubles	/ vs /		vs vs	vs vs vs vs
January 18	San Diego Open; San Diego, United States; Hard – Challenger 75 – 32S/24Q/16D; Singles – Doubles	vs		vs vs	vs vs vs vs
January 18	San Diego Open; San Diego, United States; Hard – Challenger 75 – 32S/24Q/16D; Singles – Doubles	/ vs /		vs vs	vs vs vs vs
January 25	Open Quimper Bretagne; Quimper, France; Hard (i) – Challenger 125 – 32S/24Q/16D; Singles – Doubles	vs		vs vs	vs vs vs vs
January 25	Open Quimper Bretagne; Quimper, France; Hard (i) – Challenger 125 – 32S/24Q/16D; Singles – Doubles	/ vs /		vs vs	vs vs vs vs
January 25	Challenger Concepción; Concepción, Chile; Clay – Challenger 100 – 32S/24Q/16D; Singles – Doubles	vs		vs vs	vs vs vs vs
January 25	Challenger Concepción; Concepción, Chile; Clay – Challenger 100 – 32S/24Q/16D; Singles – Doubles	/ vs /		vs vs	vs vs vs vs
January 25	Oeiras Indoors; Oeiras, Portugal; Hard (i) – Challenger 75 – 32S/24Q/16D; Singles – Doubles	vs		vs vs	vs vs vs vs
January 25	Oeiras Indoors; Oeiras, Portugal; Hard (i) – Challenger 75 – 32S/24Q/16D; Singles – Doubles	/ vs /		vs vs	vs vs vs vs
January 25	San Diego Challenger; San Diego, United States; Hard – Challenger 75 – 32S/24Q/16D; Singles – Doubles	vs		vs vs	vs vs vs vs
January 25	San Diego Challenger; San Diego, United States; Hard – Challenger 75 – 32S/24Q/16D; Singles – Doubles	/ vs /		vs vs	vs vs vs vs
January 25	Trnava Challenger; Trnava, Slovakia; Hard (i) – Challenger 50 – 32S/24Q/16D; Singles – Doubles	vs		vs vs	vs vs vs vs
January 25	Trnava Challenger; Trnava, Slovakia; Hard (i) – Challenger 50 – 32S/24Q/16D; Singles – Doubles	/ vs /		vs vs	vs vs vs vs
January 25	Trofeo Città di Cesenatico; Cesenatico, Italy; Hard (i) – Challenger 50 – 32S/24Q/16D; Singles – Doubles	vs		vs vs	vs vs vs vs
January 25	Trofeo Città di Cesenatico; Cesenatico, Italy; Hard (i) – Challenger 50 – 32S/24Q/16D; Singles – Doubles	/ vs /		vs vs	vs vs vs vs

=== February ===
Week of	Tournament	Champions	Runners-up	Semifinalists	Quarterfinalists
February 1	Trofeo Faip–Perrel; Bergamo, Italy; Hard (i) – Challenger 125 – 32S/24Q/16D; Singles – Doubles	vs		vs vs	vs vs vs vs
February 1	Trofeo Faip–Perrel; Bergamo, Italy; Hard (i) – Challenger 125 – 32S/24Q/16D; Singles – Doubles	/ vs /		vs vs	vs vs vs vs
February 1	Rosario Challenger; Rosario, Argentina; Clay – Challenger 125 – 32S/24Q/16D; Singles – Doubles	vs		vs vs	vs vs vs vs
February 1	Rosario Challenger; Rosario, Argentina; Clay – Challenger 125 – 32S/24Q/16D; Singles – Doubles	/ vs /		vs vs	vs vs vs vs
February 1	Queensland International; Brisbane, Australia; Hard – Challenger 75 – 32S/24Q/16D; Singles – Doubles	vs		vs vs	vs vs vs vs
February 1	Queensland International; Brisbane, Australia; Hard – Challenger 75 – 32S/24Q/16D; Singles – Doubles	/ vs /		vs vs	vs vs vs vs
February 1	Cleveland Open; Cleveland, United States; Hard (i) – Challenger 75 – 32S/24Q/16D; Singles – Doubles	vs		vs vs	vs vs vs vs
February 1	Cleveland Open; Cleveland, United States; Hard (i) – Challenger 75 – 32S/24Q/16D; Singles – Doubles	/ vs /		vs vs	vs vs vs vs

=== March ===
Week of	Tournament	Champions	Runners-up	Semifinalists	Quarterfinalists
To be confirmed

=== April ===
Week of	Tournament	Champions	Runners-up	Semifinalists	Quarterfinalists
To be confirmed

=== May ===
Week of	Tournament	Champions	Runners-up	Semifinalists	Quarterfinalists
To be confirmed

=== June ===
Week of	Tournament	Champions	Runners-up	Semifinalists	Quarterfinalists
To be confirmed

=== July ===
Week of	Tournament	Champions	Runners-up	Semifinalists	Quarterfinalists
To be confirmed

=== August ===
Week of	Tournament	Champions	Runners-up	Semifinalists	Quarterfinalists
To be confirmed

=== September ===
Week of	Tournament	Champions	Runners-up	Semifinalists	Quarterfinalists
To be confirmed

=== October ===
Week of	Tournament	Champions	Runners-up	Semifinalists	Quarterfinalists
To be confirmed

=== November ===
Week of	Tournament	Champions	Runners-up	Semifinalists	Quarterfinalists
To be confirmed

=== December ===
Week of	Tournament	Champions	Runners-up	Semifinalists	Quarterfinalists
To be confirmed

== Statistical information ==
These tables present the number of singles (S) and doubles (D) titles won by each player and each nation during the season. The players/nations are sorted by: 1) total number of titles (a doubles title won by two players representing the same nation counts as only one win for the nation); 2) a singles > doubles hierarchy; 3) alphabetical order (by family names for players).

The ATP announced in March 2022 that players representing Russia or Belarus would not be able to compete under their respective country's flag due to the 2022 Russian invasion of Ukraine. These players competed under no nationality, and any titles won by these players weren't counted towards a country's tally of total titles.

== Point distribution ==
Points are awarded as follows:

Tournament category	Singles									Doubles				
Tournament category	W	F	SF	QF	R16	R32	Q	Q2	Q1	W	F	SF	QF	R16
Challenger 175	175	90	50	25	13	0	6	3	0	175	100	60	32	0
Challenger 125	125	64	35	16	8	0	5	3	0	125	75	45	25	0
Challenger 100	100	50	25	14	7	0	4	2	0	100	60	36	20	0
Challenger 75	75	44	22	12	6	0	4	2	0	75	50	30	16	0
Challenger 50	50	25	14	8	4	0	3	1	0	50	30	17	9	0
