= 2026 Morelia Open =

- Date: 23–28 March
- Edition: 2nd
- Surface: Hard
- Location: Morelia, Mexico

Champions

Singles
- (Croatia) Borna Gojo

Doubles
- (Ecuador) Diego Hidalgo / (United States) Patrik Trhac
- Morelia Open

The 2026 Morelia Open was a professional men's tennis tournament played on hard courts. It was the second edition of the tournament and part of the 2026 ATP Challenger Tour. It took place in Morelia, Mexico from 23 to 28 March 2026.

== Champions ==
=== Singles ===
- (Croatia) Borna Gojo def. (Argentina) Juan Pablo Ficovich 7–6^{(7–5)}, 6–2.

=== Doubles ===
- (Ecuador) Diego Hidalgo / (United States) Patrik Trhac def. (United States) Nathaniel Lammons / (United States) Jackson Withrow 7–6^{(7–5)}, 7–6^{(7–4)}.

== Singles main-draw entrants ==
=== Seeds ===
Country	Player	Rank^{1}	Seed
AUS	James Duckworth	80	1
AUS	Adam Walton	85	2
AUS	Tristan Schoolkate	114	3
HKG	Coleman Wong	120	4
JPN	Shintaro Mochizuki	129	5
LUX	Chris Rodesch	142	6
CHN	Bu Yunchaokete	150	7
CRO	Borna Gojo	181	8

- Rankings are as of 16 March 2026.

=== Other entrants ===
The following players received wildcards into the singles main draw:

- (Mexico) Alex Hernández
- (Mexico) Alan Magadán
- (Mexico) Alan Fernando Rubio Fierros

The following players received entry into the singles main draw as special exempts:

- (Japan) ~~Taro Daniel~~
- (United States) ~~Michael Mmoh~~

The following players received entry into the singles main draw as alternates:

- (Mexico) Rodrigo Pacheco Méndez
- (United States) Keegan Smith

The following players received entry from the qualifying draw:

- (United States) Alafia Ayeni
- (France) Robin Catry
- (Argentina) Facundo Mena
- (Australia) Marc Polmans
- (Colombia) Miguel Tobón
- (United States) Quinn Vandecasteele

The following players received entry as lucky losers:

- (Brazil) Mateus Alves
- (Germany) Max Wiskandt
