= 2022 Challenger de Santiago – Doubles =

Doubles
- 2022 Challenger de Santiago

Final
- Champions: (Ecuador) Diego Hidalgo (Colombia) Cristian Rodríguez
- Runners-up: (Argentina) Pedro Cachin (Argentina) Facundo Mena
- Score: 6–4, 6–4

Events
Singles	Doubles
- Challenger de Santiago

Evan King and Max Schnur were the defending champions but chose not to defend their title.

Diego Hidalgo and Cristian Rodríguez won the title after defeating Pedro Cachin and Facundo Mena 6–4, 6–4 in the final.

== Seeds ==
1. (Peru) Sergio Galdós / (Portugal) Gonçalo Oliveira (first round)
2. (Ecuador) Diego Hidalgo / (Colombia) Cristian Rodríguez (champions)
3. (Colombia) Nicolás Barrientos / (Philippines) Ruben Gonzales (quarterfinals)
4. (Netherlands) Jesper de Jong / (Netherlands) Bart Stevens (semifinals)

== Draw ==
Key

- Q = Qualifier
- WC = Wild card
- LL = Lucky loser
- Alt = Alternate
- ITF = ITF entry
- PR = Protected ranking
- SR = Special ranking
- SE = Special exempt
- JE = Junior exempt
- JR = Junior Accelerator Programme entrant
- CO = College Accelerator Programme entrant
- NG = Next Gen Accelerator Program entrant
- w/o = Walkover
- r = Retired
- d = Defaulted

First round
1	(Peru) S Galdós (Portugal) G Oliveira	4	6	[7]
(Argentina) GA Olivieri (Argentina) C Ugo Carabelli	6	3	[10]
(Slovenia) T Lipovšek Puches (Argentina) JI Londero	2	6	[10]
(France) E Furness (France) M Martineau	6	4	[7]
3	(Colombia) N Barrientos (Philippines) R Gonzales	3	6	[10]
(Argentina) TM Etcheverry (Argentina) TA Tirante	6	2	[7]
WC	(Chile) Daniel Antonio Núñez (Chile) Sebastián Santibáñez	3	2
(Argentina) P Cachin (Argentina) F Mena	6	6
(Czech Republic) V Kopřiva (Peru) A Merino	2	4
(Argentina) H Casanova (Argentina) S Rodríguez Taverna	6	6
(Argentina) A Collarini (Argentina) R Olivo	5	3
4	(Netherlands) J de Jong (Netherlands) B Stevens	7	6
(Bolivia) B Arias (Bolivia) F Zeballos	6	6
WC	(Chile) Gonzalo Achondo (Chile) Benjamín Torres	2	1
Alt	(France) C Denolly (Japan) R Noguchi	3	4
2	(Ecuador) D Hidalgo (Colombia) C Rodríguez	6	6

Quarterfinals
(Argentina) GA Olivieri (Argentina) C Ugo Carabelli	6	0
(Slovenia) T Lipovšek Puches (Argentina) JI Londero	2	0^{r}
3	(Colombia) N Barrientos (Philippines) R Gonzales	2	7^{7}	[8]
(Argentina) P Cachin (Argentina) F Mena	6	6^{4}	[10]
(Argentina) H Casanova (Argentina) S Rodríguez Taverna	6	3	[6]
4	(Netherlands) J de Jong (Netherlands) B Stevens	4	6	[10]
(Bolivia) B Arias (Bolivia) F Zeballos	6	5	[5]
2	(Ecuador) D Hidalgo (Colombia) C Rodríguez	2	7	[10]

Semifinals
(Argentina) GA Olivieri (Argentina) C Ugo Carabelli	4	3
(Argentina) P Cachin (Argentina) F Mena	6	6
4	(Netherlands) J de Jong (Netherlands) B Stevens	7^{7}	4	[8]
2	(Ecuador) D Hidalgo (Colombia) C Rodríguez	6^{5}	6	[10]

Final
(Argentina) P Cachin (Argentina) F Mena	4	4
2	(Ecuador) D Hidalgo (Colombia) C Rodríguez	6	6
