= 2022 Challenger de Santiago =

- Date: 7–13 March
- Edition: 16th
- Surface: Clay
- Location: Santiago, Chile

Champions

Singles
- (Bolivia) Hugo Dellien

Doubles
- (Ecuador) Diego Hidalgo / (Colombia) Cristian Rodríguez
- Challenger de Santiago

The 2022 Challenger de Santiago was a professional tennis tournament played on clay courts. It was the 16th edition of the tournament which was part of the 2022 ATP Challenger Tour. It took place in Santiago, Chile between 7 and 13 March 2022.

== Singles main-draw entrants ==
=== Seeds ===
Country	Player	Rank^{1}	Seed
CZE	Jiří Lehečka	94	1
CHI	Alejandro Tabilo	98	2
BOL	Hugo Dellien	103	3
PER	Juan Pablo Varillas	116	4
ARG	Tomás Martín Etcheverry	124	5
ARG	Juan Ignacio Londero	132	6
CHI	Nicolás Jarry	146	7
CHI	Tomás Barrios Vera	149	8

- ^{1} Rankings are as of 28 February 2022.

=== Other entrants ===
The following players received wildcards into the singles main draw:

- (Chile) Ignacio Becerra
- (Chile) Diego Fernández Flores
- (Chile) Daniel Antonio Núñez

The following players received entry from the qualifying draw:

- (Argentina) Hernán Casanova
- (France) Evan Furness
- (Argentina) Facundo Juárez
- (United Kingdom) Paul Jubb
- (France) Matteo Martineau
- (Argentina) Juan Bautista Torres

The following player received entry as a lucky loser:

- (Brazil) Daniel Dutra da Silva

== Champions ==
=== Singles ===
- (Bolivia) Hugo Dellien def. (Chile) Alejandro Tabilo 6–3, 4–6, 6–4.

=== Doubles ===
- (Ecuador) Diego Hidalgo / (Colombia) Cristian Rodríguez def. (Argentina) Pedro Cachin / (Argentina) Facundo Mena 6–4, 6–4.
