= 2022 Challenger de Santiago – Singles =

Singles
- 2022 Challenger de Santiago

Final
- Champion: (Bolivia) Hugo Dellien
- Runner-up: (Chile) Alejandro Tabilo
- Score: 6–3, 4–6, 6–4

Events
Singles	Doubles
- Challenger de Santiago

Sebastián Báez was the defending champion but chose not to defend his title.

Hugo Dellien won the title after defeating Alejandro Tabilo 6–3, 4–6, 6–4 in the final.

== Seeds ==
1. (Czech Republic) Jiří Lehečka (quarterfinals)
2. (Chile) Alejandro Tabilo (final)
3. (Bolivia) Hugo Dellien (champion)
4. (Peru) Juan Pablo Varillas (semifinals)
5. (Argentina) Tomás Martín Etcheverry (semifinals)
6. (Argentina) Juan Ignacio Londero (second round)
7. (Chile) Nicolás Jarry (first round)
8. (Chile) Tomás Barrios Vera (first round)

== Draw ==
Key

- Q = Qualifier
- WC = Wild card
- LL = Lucky loser
- Alt = Alternate
- ITF = ITF entry
- PR = Protected ranking
- SR = Special ranking
- SE = Special exempt
- JE = Junior exempt
- JR = Junior Accelerator Programme entrant
- CO = College Accelerator Programme entrant
- NG = Next Gen Accelerator Program entrant
- w/o = Walkover
- r = Retired
- d = Defaulted

=== Finals ===
Semifinals
5	(Argentina) Tomás Martín Etcheverry	3	7^{7}	4
3	(Bolivia) Hugo Dellien	6	6^{3}	6
4	(Peru) Juan Pablo Varillas	6^{6}	1
2	(Chile) Alejandro Tabilo	7^{8}	6

Final
3	(Bolivia) Hugo Dellien	6	4	6
2	(Chile) Alejandro Tabilo	3	6	4

=== Top half ===
First round
1	(Czech Republic) J Lehečka	6	6
Q	(France) M Martineau	3	2
(Argentina) S Rodríguez Taverna	2	1
(Portugal) G Oliveira	6	6
WC	(Chile) D Fernández Flores	3	1
(Argentina) C Ugo Carabelli	6	6
Q	(France) E Furness	5	2
5	(Argentina) TM Etcheverry	7	6
3	(Bolivia) H Dellien	2	7^{7}	6
(Argentina) P Cachin	6	6^{4}	1
(Argentina) R Olivo	6	6
WC	(Chile) Ignacio Becerra	2	0
Q	(Argentina) H Casanova	1	6	2
Q	(United Kingdom) P Jubb	6	2	6
(Netherlands) J de Jong	6	7^{7}
8	(Chile) T Barrios Vera	1	6^{0}

Second round
1	(Czech Republic) J Lehečka	6	3	6
(Portugal) G Oliveira	3	6	3
(Argentina) C Ugo Carabelli	1	6	5
5	(Argentina) TM Etcheverry	6	4	7
3	(Bolivia) H Dellien	6	6
(Argentina) R Olivo	3	4
Q	(United Kingdom) P Jubb	5	3
(Netherlands) J de Jong	7	6

Quarterfinals
1	(Czech Republic) J Lehečka	4	3
5	(Argentina) TM Etcheverry	6	6
3	(Bolivia) H Dellien	6	6
(Netherlands) J de Jong	3	3

Semifinals
5	(Argentina) TM Etcheverry	3	7^{7}	4
3	(Bolivia) H Dellien	6	6^{3}	6

=== Bottom half ===
First round
6	(Argentina) JI Londero	6	7^{7}
(Argentina) A Collarini	0	6^{5}
(Brazil) M Pucinelli de Almeida	6	3	6
(Argentina) GA Olivieri	3	6	3
LL	(Brazil) D Dutra da Silva	4	2
Q	(Argentina) JB Torres	6	6
(Argentina) TA Tirante	4	3
4	(Peru) JP Varillas	6	6
7	(Chile) N Jarry	6	6^{3}	3
(Czech Republic) V Kopřiva	1	7^{7}	6
(Argentina) F Mena	3	4
(Argentina) N Kicker	6	6
Q	(Argentina) Facundo Juárez	2	7^{7}	1
(Chile) G Lama	6	6^{4}	6
WC	(Chile) Daniel Antonio Núñez	5	0
2	(Chile) A Tabilo	7	6

Second round
6	(Argentina) JI Londero	7^{7}	2	5
(Brazil) M Pucinelli de Almeida	6^{5}	6	7
Q	(Argentina) JB Torres	1	3
4	(Peru) JP Varillas	6	6
(Czech Republic) V Kopřiva	6	4	7
(Argentina) N Kicker	4	6	5
(Chile) G Lama	1	2
2	(Chile) A Tabilo	6	6

Quarterfinals
(Brazil) M Pucinelli de Almeida	5	2
4	(Peru) JP Varillas	7	6
(Czech Republic) V Kopřiva	2	6	3
2	(Chile) A Tabilo	6	4	6

Semifinals
4	(Peru) JP Varillas	6^{6}	1
2	(Chile) A Tabilo	7^{8}	6
