= Challenger del Biobío =

Tennis tournament in Chile

- 2022 Challenger del Biobío

Defunct tennis tournament
- Event name: Challenger del Biobío
- Location: Concepción, Chile
- Venue: Club de Campo Bellavista
- Category: ATP Challenger Tour
- Surface: Clay
- Draw: 32S/24Q/16D
- Prize money: $ 53,120
- Website: clubcampobellavista.cl

Current champions (2022)
- Singles: (Argentina) Tomás Martín Etcheverry
- Doubles: (Argentina) Andrea Collarini (Argentina) Renzo Olivo

The Challenger del Biobío was a professional tennis tournament played on clay courts. It was part of the Association of Tennis Professionals (ATP) Challenger Tour in 2022, and was held in Concepción, Chile. It was played with no COVID-19 pandemic restrictions, with public in attendance.

It was promoted by the regional government with a provision of $30 mln to make it a long-running tournament, with a second edition planned.

== Past finals ==
=== Singles ===
Year	Champion	Runner-up	Score
2022	(Argentina) Tomás Martín Etcheverry	(Bolivia) Hugo Dellien	6–3, 6–2

=== Doubles ===
Year	Champions	Runners-up	Score
2022	(Argentina) Andrea Collarini (Argentina) Renzo Olivo	(Ecuador) Diego Hidalgo (Colombia) Cristian Rodríguez	6–4, 6–4
