= Sauipe =

District of Mata de São João, Bahia, Brazil

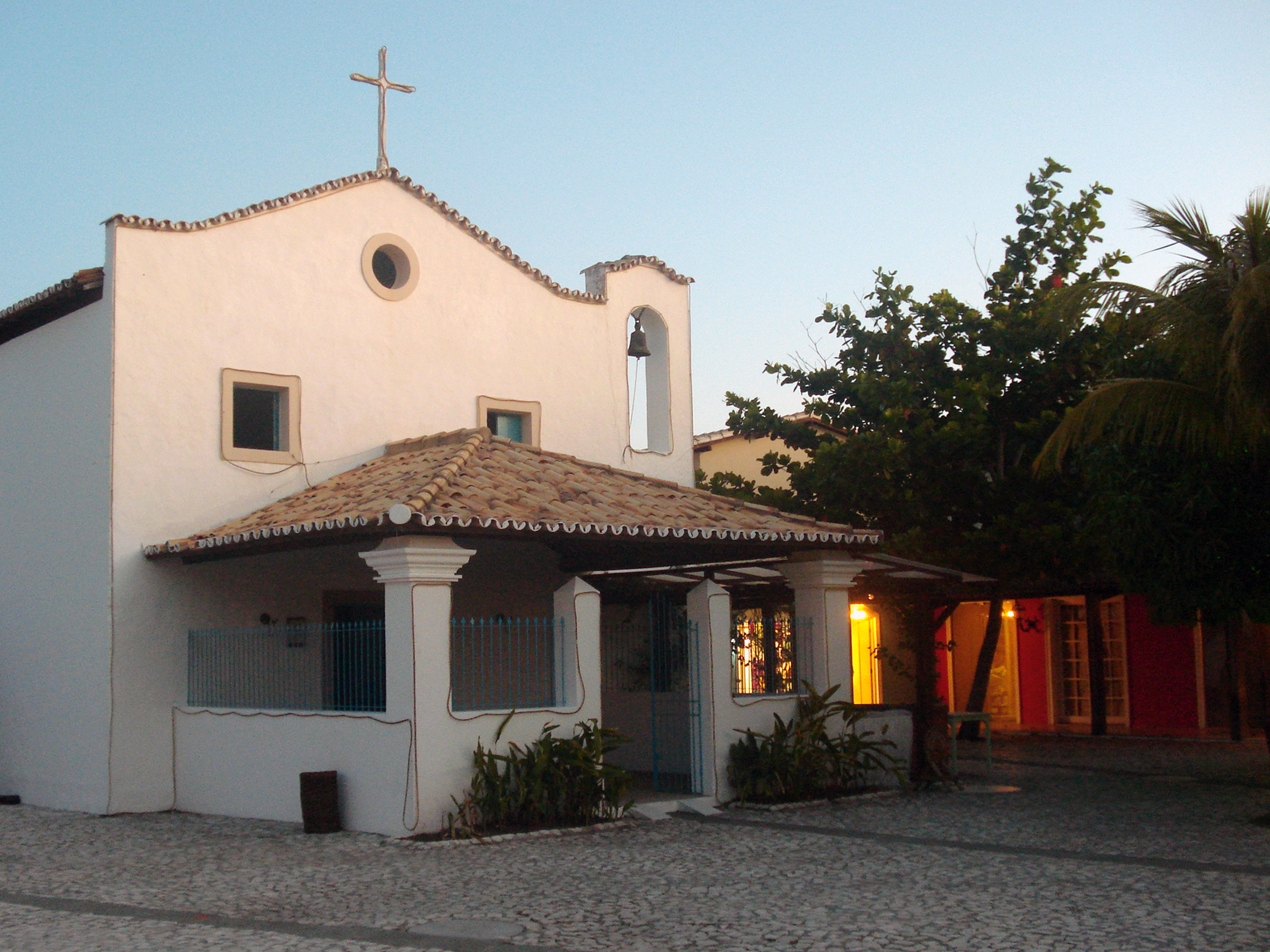
Chapel in Vila Nova da Praia, in Sauipe

Sauipe is a district in the municipality of Mata de São João, on the northern coast of the state of Bahia, in Brazil. There are few permanent residents there, due to the very high cost of residences and the fact that almost the entire area is filled with hotels and resorts, which form the largest tourist complex in Brazil.

== Toponym ==
The name of district is a reference to a local namesake river. "Sauipe" coming from tupi term saûí'ype, that means "on saguis river's" (saûí, sagui + 'y, river + pe, on).

== Costa do Sauipe ==
Sauipe is recognized for the complex Costa do Sauipe, which is a major tourist hotel development consisting of five resorts and five inns. It extends over 176 hectares and is 76 kilometers from Salvador Airport. At the moment it is managed by Rio Quente Resorts Group.

Due to its size, it has already received events such as a world tennis tournament, the Brasil Open from 2001 to 2011, the 2001 Beach Soccer World Championship, the XXXVI Ordinary Meeting of the Mercosur Common Market Council, the 2014 FIFA World Cup draw, and currently another tennis tournament, the Costa do Sauípe Open that started in 2025.

Next to the tourist complex, Eco Parque Sauipe is located, which attracts tourists by the biodiversity of the ecosystem of the conjunction between small stretches of restinga and mangroves surrounded by the Atlantic Forest, all in 66 hectares.
