= Costa do Sauípe Open =

- 2025 Costa do Sauípe Open

ATP Challenger Tour
- Location: Sauipe, Brazil
- Venue: Costa do Sauípe, Arena Sauipe
- Category: ATP Challenger Tour 125
- Surface: Clay
- Prize money: $200,000 (2025)
- Website: website

The Costa do Sauípe Open is a professional tennis tournament played on clay courts. It is currently part of the ATP Challenger Tour 125. It was first held in Sauipe, Brazil in 2025.

== Past finals ==
=== Singles ===
Year	Champion	Runner-up	Score
2025	(Argentina) Román Andrés Burruchaga	(Paraguay) Daniel Vallejo	6–1, 6–2
2026	(Argentina) Camilo Ugo Carabelli	(Brazil) Thiago Seyboth Wild	6–2, 7–5

=== Doubles ===
Year	Champions	Runners-up	Score
2025	(Brazil) Luís Miguel (Brazil) Eduardo Ribeiro	(Ecuador) Gonzalo Escobar (Mexico) Miguel Ángel Reyes-Varela	7–6^{(7–4)}, 4–6, [10–5]
2026	(Czech Republic) Zdeněk Kolář (Argentina) Santiago Rodríguez Taverna	(Ecuador) Diego Hidalgo (Argentina) Andrés Molteni	6–4, 6–4

== See also ==
- Brasil Open
