= Diego Hidalgo (tennis) =

Ecuadorian tennis player

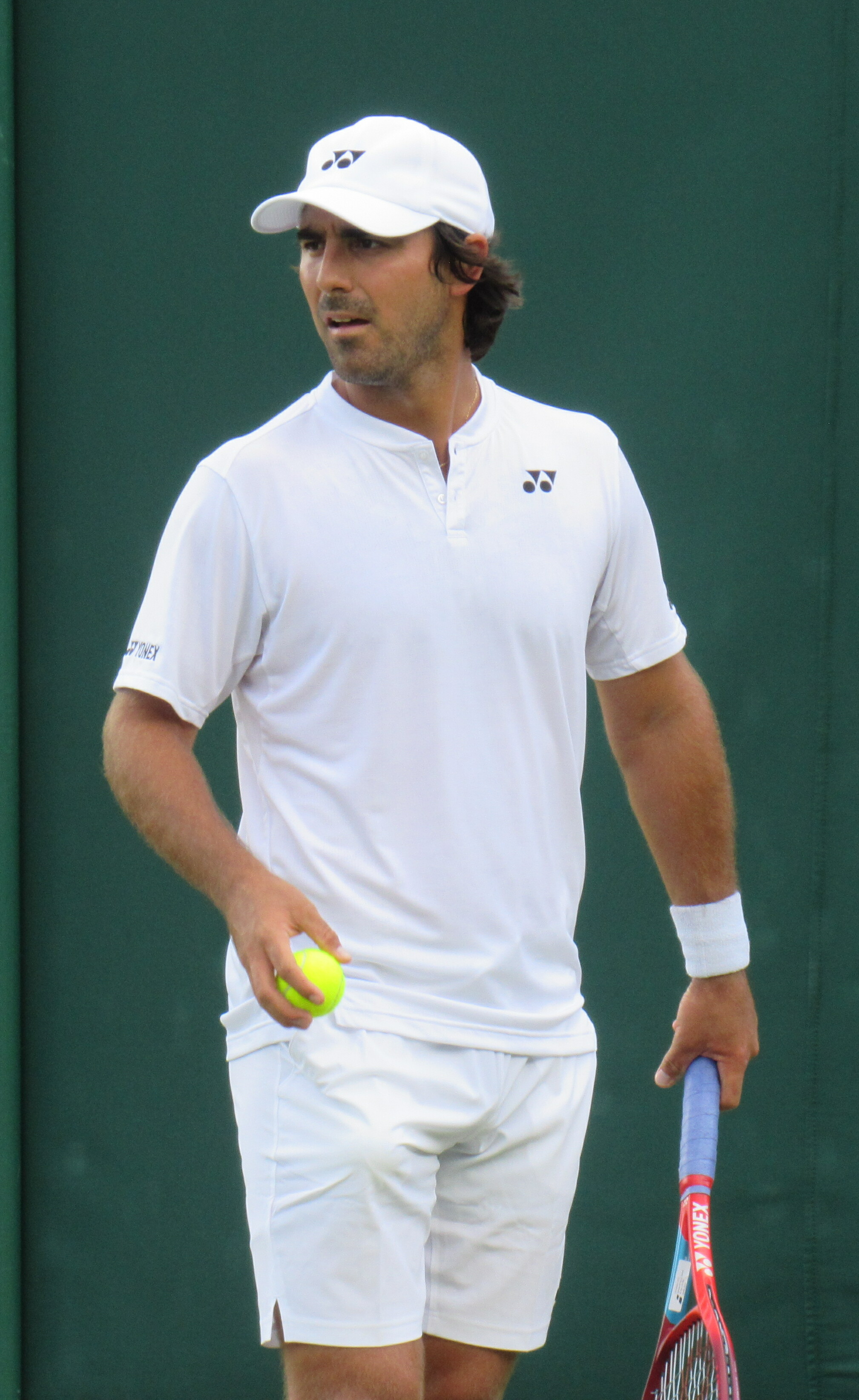
- Hidalgo in Wimbledon 2022
- Country (sports): Ecuador
- Residence: Barcelona, Spain
- Born: 18 April 1993 (age 33) Guayaquil, Ecuador
- Height: 1.80 m (5 ft 11 in)
- Plays: Left-handed (two-handed backhand)
- College: Florida
- Prize money: $ 410,679

Singles
- Career record: 1–1
- Career titles: 0; 0 Challenger, 2 World Tennis Tour
- Highest ranking: No. 358 (3 February 2020)

Doubles
- Career record: 28–49
- Career titles: 0; 18 Challenger, 16 Futures
- Highest ranking: No. 61 (1 July 2024)
- Current ranking: No. 79 (16 March 2026)

Grand Slam doubles results
- Australian Open: 2R (2025)
- French Open: 2R (2026)
- Wimbledon: 2R (2022)
- US Open: 2R (2022)

Team competitions
- Davis Cup: 5–7
Medal record
Representing Ecuador
Men's tennis
South American Games
Gold medal – first place	2010 Medellín	Men's doubles
Gold medal – first place	2018 Cochabamba	Men's doubles
- Last updated on: 16 March 2026.

Diego Hidalgo (born 18 April 1993) is an Ecuadorian tennis player who specializes in doubles. He has a career high ATP doubles ranking of world No. 61 achieved on 1 July 2024. He also has a career high singles ranking of No. 358 achieved on 3 February 2020.

Hidalgo has won 17 ATP Challengers and 16 ITF doubles titles. He represents Ecuador at the Davis Cup where he has a W/L record of 4–6.

== College career ==
Hidalgo played college tennis at the University of Florida between 2013 and 2016. He won the SEC Player of the Year Award in 2016.

== ATP Tour career finals ==
=== Doubles: 1 (1 runner-up) ===
Legend Grand Slam tournaments (0-0) ATP Finals (0–0) ATP 1000 (0–0) ATP 500 (0–0) ATP 250 (0–1)	Finals by surface Hard (0–0) Clay (0–0) Grass (0–1)	Finals by setting Outdoor (0–1) Indoor (0–0)

Result	W–L	Date	Tournament	Tier	Surface	Partner	Opponents	Score
Loss	0–1	Jun 2024	Mallorca Championships, Spain	ATP 250	Grass	(Chile) Alejandro Tabilo	(United Kingdom) Julian Cash (United States) Robert Galloway	4–6, 4–6

== ITF and ATP Challenger Tour finals ==
=== Singles: 4 (2–2) ===
Legend
ATP Challengers (0–0)
ITF World Tennis Tour (2–2)

Result	No.	Date	Tournament	Surface	Opponent	Score
Loss	1.	March 24, 2019	M15 Cancún, Mexico	Hard	(Argentina) Facundo Mena	2–6, 4–6
Win	1.	June 23, 2019	M15 Orlando, United States	Clay	(Venezuela) Ricardo Rodríguez	6–1, 6–4
Win	2.	June 30, 2019	M15 Rochester, United States	Clay	(United States) Strong Kirchheimer	7–6^{(10–8)}, 7–6^{(7–2)}
Loss	2.	August 25, 2019	M25 Poznań, Poland	Clay	(Czech Republic) Václav Šafránek	3–6, 2–6

=== Doubles: 72 (36–36) ===
Legend
ATP Challengers (20–20)
ITF Futures/World Tennis Tour (16–16)

Result	No.	Date	Tournament	Surface	Partner	Opponents	Score
Loss	1.	September 12, 2010	Guayaquil, Ecuador F1	Hard	(Ecuador) Julio César Campozano	(Colombia) Nicolás Barrientos (Colombia) Sebastián Serrano	7–6^{(7–2)}, 6–7^{(5–7)}, [7–10]
Loss	2.	October 16, 2011	Fernandópolis, Brazil F34	Clay	(Brazil) Wilson Leite	(Brazil) Raony Carvalho (Brazil) Fabrício Neis	2–6, 6–7^{(5–7)}
Loss	3.	October 22, 2011	Lins, Brazil F35	Clay	(Brazil) Ricardo Siggia	(Brazil) Victor Maynard (Brazil) Fernando Romboli	6–2, 2–6, [0–10]
Win	4.	December 24, 2011	Brasília, Brazil F44	Clay	(Brazil) Fernando Romboli	(Argentina) Maximiliano Estévez (Argentina) Agustín Picco	6–2, 6–4
Win	5.	April 28, 2012	Neuquén, Argentina F8	Clay	(Peru) Sergio Galdós	(Chile) Cristóbal Saavedra Corvalán (Chile) Juan Carlos Sáez	3–6, 6–3, [10–6]
Loss	6.	July 14, 2012	Córdoba, Argentina F17	Clay	(Argentina) Juan Ignacio Londero	(Argentina) Andrés Molteni (Argentina) Juan Vazquez-Valenzuela	2–6, 2–6
Win	7.	August 16, 2014	Guayaquil, Ecuador F2	Hard	(Ecuador) Roberto Quiroz	(Argentina) Gabriel Alejandro Hidalgo (Brazil) Caio Silva	7–5, 6–7^{(2–7)}, [10–8]
Win	8.	May 28, 2017	Hammamet, Tunisia F20	Clay	(Bolivia) Boris Arias	(Portugal) André Gaspar Murta (Tunisia) Anis Ghorbel	7–5, 6–3
Win	9.	November 5, 2017	Antalya, Turkey F41	Clay	(France) Florent Diep	(Brazil) Felipe Meligeni Alves (Brazil) Christian Oliveira	6–3, 6–4
Win	10.	November 12, 2017	Antalya, Turkey F42	Clay	(Brazil) Thiago Seyboth Wild	(Turkey) Koray Kırcı (Japan) Takashi Saito	6–2, 6–3
Loss	11.	December 17, 2017	Antalya, Turkey F47	Clay	(Argentina) Dante Gennaro	(Colombia) Cristian Rodríguez (France) Tak Khunn Wang	6–7^{(2–7)}, 2–6
Win	12.	March 25, 2018	Hammamet, Tunisia F11	Clay	(Argentina) Mariano Kestelboim	(North Macedonia) Tomislav Jotovski (Croatia) Duje Kekez	6–3, 6–7^{(2–7)}, [10–5]
Loss	13.	April 20, 2018	Madrid, Spain F9	Clay	(Chile) Juan Carlos Sáez	(Argentina) Pedro Cachin (Argentina) Patricio Heras	6–7^{(2–7)}, 6–3, [7–10]
Loss	14.	May 6, 2018	Djerba, Tunisia F17	Hard	(Argentina) Ignacio Carou	(Portugal) Bernardo Saraiva (Netherlands) Sem Verbeek	5–7, 3–6
Win	15.	May 13, 2018	Djerba, Tunisia F18	Hard	(Netherlands) Sem Verbeek	(Tunisia) Anis Ghorbel (Bulgaria) Vasko Mladenov	6–2, 6–4
Win	16.	June 24, 2018	Hammamet, Tunisia F24	Clay	(Argentina) Juan Ignacio Galarza	(Russia) Alexander Boborykin (Russia) Timur Kiyamov	6–4, 6–4
Win	17.	July 1, 2018	Hammamet, Tunisia F25	Clay	(Argentina) Juan Ignacio Galarza	(Bulgaria) Alexandar Lazarov (Argentina) Manuel Peña López	7–5, 6–4
Loss	18.	July 22, 2018	Gandia, Spain F19	Clay	(Bolivia) Boris Arias	(Spain) Javier Barranco Cosano (Italy) Raúl Brancaccio	6–4, 2–6, [5–10]
Loss	19.	September 1, 2018	San Sebastián, Spain F25	Clay	(Brazil) João Pedro Sorgi	(Spain) Eduard Esteve Lobato (Spain) Oriol Roca Batalla	3–6, 3–6
Loss	20.	September 30, 2018	Trujillo, Peru F1	Clay	(Argentina) Mariano Kestelboim	(Peru) Arklon Huertas del Pino (Peru) Conner Huertas del Pino	4–6, 6–4, [4–10]
Win	21.	October 7, 2018	Lima, Peru F2	Clay	(Argentina) Mariano Kestelboim	(Argentina) Leonardo Aboian (Argentina) Tomás Farjat	6–2, 6–3
Loss	22.	February 3, 2019	M15 Monastir, Tunisia	Hard	(Brazil) Gilbert Klier Júnior	(United Kingdom) Evan Hoyt (Tunisia) Skander Mansouri	6–7^{(1–7)}, 4–6
Win	23.	February 17, 2019	M15 Monastir, Tunisia	Hard	(Tunisia) Skander Mansouri	(France) Dan Added (France) Yanais Laurent	7–5, 6–0
Win	24.	April 21, 2019	M15 Cancún, Mexico	Hard	(Guatemala) Wilfredo González	(France) Quentin Robert (United Kingdom) Isaac Stoute	6–4, 6–4
Loss	25.	June 9, 2019	M15 Champaign, United States	Hard	(Venezuela) Ricardo Rodríguez	(Brazil) Alex Blumenberg (United Kingdom) Mark Whitehouse	6–3, 4–6, [6–10]
Loss	26.	June 23, 2019	M15 Orlando, United States	Clay	(Venezuela) Ricardo Rodríguez	(United States) Trent Bryde (United States) Tyler Zink	6–7^{(1–7)}, 4–6
Win	27.	August 4, 2019	Lexington, United States	Hard	(United States) Martin Redlicki	(Venezuela) Roberto Maytín (United States) Jackson Withrow	6–2, 6–2
Loss	28.	August 25, 2019	M25 Poznań, Poland	Clay	(Brazil) Pedro Sakamoto	(Poland) Mateusz Kowalczyk (Poland) Piotr Matuszewski	3–6, 4–6
Win	29.	September 1, 2019	M25 Győr, Hungary	Clay	(Brazil) Pedro Sakamoto	(Croatia) Ivan Sabanov (Croatia) Matej Sabanov	6–4, 6–1
Loss	30.	February 21, 2021	Concepción, Chile	Clay	(Peru) Sergio Galdós	(Brazil) Orlando Luz (Brazil) Rafael Matos	5–7, 4–6
Loss	31.	February 28, 2021	M25 Naples, United States	Clay	(Colombia) Cristian Rodríguez	(Colombia) Alejandro Gómez (United States) Junior Alexander Ore	4–6, 6–7^{(7–9)}
Loss	32.	April 23, 2021	Salinas, Ecuador	Hard	(Tunisia) Skander Mansouri	(Mexico) Miguel Ángel Reyes-Varela (Brazil) Fernando Romboli	5–7, 6–4, [2–10]
Win	33.	June 5, 2021	M25 Santo Domingo, Dominican Republic	Hard	(Brazil) Igor Marcondes	(Peru) Conner Huertas del Pino (Peru) Jorge Panta	7–5, 6–7^{(10–12)}, [10–6]
Loss	34.	June 5, 2021	M25 Santo Domingo, Dominican Republic	Hard	(Brazil) Igor Marcondes	(Peru) Conner Huertas del Pino (Peru) Jorge Panta	6-7^{(2–7)}, 6–2, [7–10]
Loss	35.	July 24, 2021	Pozoblanco, Spain	Hard	(Spain) Sergio Martos Gornés	(Netherlands) Igor Sijsling (Netherlands) Tim van Rijthoven	7–5, 6–7^{(4–7)}, [5–10]
Win	36.	August 7, 2021	M25 Guayaquil, Ecuador	Clay	(Colombia) Cristian Rodríguez	(Peru) Conner Huertas del Pino (Peru) Jorge Panta	6–3, 6–7^{(7–9)}, [10–6]
Win	37.	September 25, 2021	Ambato, Ecuador	Clay	(Colombia) Cristian Rodríguez	(Colombia) Alejandro Gómez (Argentina) Thiago Agustín Tirante	6–3, 4–6, [10–3]
Win	38.	October 9, 2021	Santiago, Chile	Clay	(Chile) Nicolás Jarry	(United States) Evan King (United States) Max Schnur	6–3, 5–7, [10–6]
Loss	39.	November 6, 2021	Guayaquil, Ecuador	Clay	(Colombia) Cristian Rodríguez	(Netherlands) Jesper de Jong (Netherlands) Bart Stevens	5-7, 2–6
Loss	40.	January 15, 2022	Blumenau, Brazil	Clay	(Colombia) Cristian Rodríguez	(Bolivia) Boris Arias (Bolivia) Federico Zeballos	6–7^{(3–7)}, 1–6
Win	41.	January 22, 2022	Concepción, Chile	Clay	(Colombia) Cristian Rodríguez	(Argentina) Francisco Cerúndolo (Argentina) Camilo Ugo Carabelli	6-2, 6–0
Win	42.	January 29, 2022	Santa Cruz de la Sierra, Bolivia	Clay	(Colombia) Cristian Rodríguez	(Slovakia) Andrej Martin (Austria) Tristan-Samuel Weissborn	4–6, 6–3, [10–8]
Win	43.	March 12, 2022	Santiago, Chile	Clay	(Colombia) Cristian Rodríguez	(Argentina) Pedro Cachin (Argentina) Facundo Mena	6-4, 6–4
Loss	44.	March 19, 2022	Concepción, Chile	Clay	(Colombia) Cristian Rodríguez	(Argentina) Andrea Collarini (Argentina) Renzo Olivo	4-6, 4–6
Loss	45.	April 23, 2022	Tallahassee, USA	Clay	(Colombia) Cristian Rodríguez	(Netherlands) Gijs Brouwer (United States) Christian Harrison	6–4, 5–7, [6–10]
Win	46.	May 7, 2022	Salvador, Brazil	Clay	(Colombia) Cristian Rodríguez	(Brazil) Orlando Luz (Brazil) Felipe Meligeni Alves	7-5, 6–1
Loss	47.	May 14, 2022	Coquimbo, Chile	Clay	(Colombia) Cristian Rodríguez	(Argentina) Guillermo Durán (Colombia) Nicolás Mejía	4–6, 6–1, [7–10]
Loss	48.	June 25, 2022	Milan, Italy	Clay	(Colombia) Cristian Rodríguez	(Italy) Luciano Darderi (Brazil) Fernando Romboli	4–6, 6–2, [5–10]
Loss	49.	July 17, 2022	Iași, Romania	Clay	(Colombia) Cristian Rodríguez	(France) Geoffrey Blancaneaux (Argentina) Renzo Olivo	4–6, 6–2, [6–10]
Win	50.	July 23, 2022	Trieste, Italy	Clay	(Colombia) Cristian Rodríguez	(Italy) Marco Bortolotti (Spain) Sergio Martos Gornés	4–6, 6–3, [10–5]
Loss	51.	March 11, 2023	Santiago, Chile	Clay	(Colombia) Cristian Rodríguez	(Brazil) Pedro Boscardin Dias (Brazil) João Lucas Reis da Silva	4–6, 6–3, [7–10]
Win	52.	March 18, 2023	Viña del Mar, Chile	Clay	(Colombia) Cristian Rodríguez	(Italy) Luciano Darderi (Italy) Andrea Vavassori	6–4, 7–6^{(7–5)}
Loss	53.	July 15, 2023	San Benedetto del Tronto, Italy	Clay	(Colombia) Cristian Rodríguez	(Brazil) Fernando Romboli (Brazil) Marcelo Zormann	3–6, 4–6
Loss	54.	August 13, 2023	Santo Domingo, Dominican Republic	Clay	(Colombia) Cristian Rodríguez	(Brazil) Pedro Boscardin Dias (Brazil) Gustavo Heide	4–6, 5–7
Win	55.	August 19, 2023	Stanford, United States	Hard	(Colombia) Cristian Rodríguez	(United Kingdom) Julian Cash (United Kingdom) Henry Patten	6–7^{(1–7)}, 6–4, [10–8]
Loss	56.	October 2, 2023	Campinas, Brazil	Clay	(Colombia) Cristian Rodríguez	(Argentina) Guido Andreozzi (Argentina) Guillermo Duran	6–7^{(4–7)}, 3–6
Win	57.	October 9, 2023	Buenos Aires, Argentina	Clay	(Colombia) Cristian Rodríguez	(Brazil) Fernando Romboli (Brazil) Marcelo Zormann	6–3, 6–2
Loss	58.	October 23, 2023	Curitiba Challenger, Brazil	Clay	(Colombia) Cristian Rodríguez	(Argentina) Guido Andreozzi (Uruguay) Ignacio Carou	4–6, 4–6
Loss	59.	April 29, 2024	Aix-en-Provence, France	Clay	(Colombia) Cristian Rodríguez	(United Kingdom) Luke Johnson (Tunisia) Skander Mansouri	3–6, 3–6
Loss	60.	June 8, 2024	Surbiton Trophy, United Kingdom	Grass	(Colombia) Nicolás Barrientos	(United Kingdom) Julian Cash (United States) Robert Galloway	4–6, 4–6
Win	61.	August 17, 2024	Santo Domingo, Dominican Republic	Clay	(Mexico) Miguel Ángel Reyes-Varela	(India) Sriram Balaji (Brazil) Fernando Romboli	6–7^{(2–7)}, 6–4, [18–16]
Win	62.	March 16, 2025	Punta Cana, Dominican Republic	Hard	(Ecuador) Gonzalo Escobar	(Czech Republic) Petr Nouza (Czech Republic) Patrik Rikl	7–6^{(7–5)}, 6–4
Win	63.	March 30, 2025	Morelia, Mexico	Hard	(Ecuador) Gonzalo Escobar	(Switzerland) Marc-Andrea Hüsler (Italy) Stefano Napolitano	6–4, 4–6, [10–3]
Loss	64.	June 8, 2025	Birmingham, United Kingdom	Grass	(United States) Patrik Trhac	(Brazil) Marcelo Demoliner (France) Sadio Doumbia	4–6, 6–3, [5–10]
Win	65.	June 15, 2025	Ilkley, United Kingdom	Grass	(United States) Patrik Trhac	(United Kingdom) Charles Broom (United Kingdom) Ben Jones	6–3, 6–7^{(8–10)}, [10–7]
Win	66.	November 16, 2025	Lyon, France	Hard (i)	(United States) Patrik Trhac	(India) Sriram Balaji (Germany) Hendrik Jebens	6–3, 6–4
Win	67.	March 15, 2026	Phoenix, USA	Hard	(United States) Patrik Trhac	(Monaco) Hugo Nys (France) Édouard Roger-Vasselin	6–7^{(6–8)}, 6–3, [10–4]
Win	68.	March 28, 2026	Morelia, Mexico	Hard	(United States) Patrik Trhac	(United States) Nathaniel Lammons (United States) Jackson Withrow	7–6^{(7–5)}, 7–6^{(7–4)}
Loss	69.	April 12, 2026	Mexico City, Mexico	Clay	(United States) Patrik Trhac	(Mexico) Santiago González (United States) Ryan Seggerman	4–6, 6–4, [8–10]
Win	70.	October 18, 2026	Santa Cruz, Bolivia	Clay	(Argentina) Mariano Kestelboim	(Brazil) Guto Miguel (Brazil) Eduardo Ribeiro	1–6, 6–4, [10–8]
Win	71.	November 1, 2026	Guayaquil, Ecuador	Clay	(Argentina) Mariano Kestelboim	(Poland) Karol Drzewiecki (Poland) Piotr Matuszewski	7–5, 6–7^{(4–7)}, [10–7]
Loss	72.	November 7, 2026	Sauipe, Brazil	Clay	(Argentina) Andrés Molteni	(Czech Republic) Zdeněk Kolář (Argentina) Santiago Rodríguez Taverna	4–6, 4–6

== National representation ==
=== South American Games ===
==== Doubles 2 (2 victory) ====
Outcome	No.	Date	Tournament	Surface	Partner	Opponent	Score
Victory	1.	24 March 2010	Medellín, Colombia	Clay	(Ecuador) Roberto Quiroz	(Argentina) Facundo Argüello (Argentina) Agustín Velotti	5–7, 7–6, 6–4
Victory	2.	2 June 2018	Cochabamba, Bolivia	Clay	(Ecuador) Emilio Gómez	(Peru) Jorge Panta (Peru) Juan Pablo Varillas	6–2, 6–3

Sporting positions
Preceded by (United States) Gonzales Austin	SEC Tennis Player of the Year; 2016	Succeeded by (Portugal) Nuno Borges
