= Morelia Open =

- 2025 Morelia Open

ATP Challenger Tour
- Location: Morelia, Mexico
- Venue: Club de Golf Tres Marías
- Category: ATP Challenger Tour 125
- Surface: Hard
- Prize money: $200,000
- Website: Website

The Morelia Open is a professional tennis tournament played on hardcourts. It is currently part of the ATP Challenger Tour 125. It was first held in Morelia, Mexico in 2025.

== Past finals ==
=== Singles ===
| Year | Champion | Runner-up | Score |
|---|---|---|---|
| 2026 | (Croatia) Borna Gojo | (Argentina) Juan Pablo Ficovich | 7–6^{(7–5)}, 6–2 |
| 2025 | (Kazakhstan) Dmitry Popko | (Australia) James Duckworth | 1–6, 6–2, 6–4 |

=== Doubles ===
| Year | Champions | Runners-up | Score |
|---|---|---|---|
| 2026 | (Ecuador) Diego Hidalgo (United States) Patrik Trhac | (United States) Nathaniel Lammons (United States) Jackson Withrow | 7–6^{(7–5)}, 7–6^{(7–4)} |
| 2025 | (Ecuador) Gonzalo Escobar (Ecuador) Diego Hidalgo | (Switzerland) Marc-Andrea Hüsler (Italy) Stefano Napolitano | 6–4, 4–6, [10–3] |
