= 2016 Curitiba Challenger – Singles =

Singles
- 2016 Curitiba Challenger

Final
- Champion: (Argentina) Agustín Velotti
- Runner-up: (Brazil) André Ghem
- Score: 6–0, 6–4

Events
Singles	Doubles
- Curitiba Challenger

This was the first edition of the tournament.

Agustín Velotti won the title after defeating André Ghem 6–0, 6–4 in the final.

== Seeds ==
1. (Brazil) João Souza (first round)
2. (Argentina) Nicolás Kicker (semifinals)
3. (Spain) Rubén Ramírez Hidalgo (quarterfinals)
4. (Chile) Gonzalo Lama (second round)
5. (Argentina) Facundo Argüello (second round)
6. (Spain) Pere Riba (semifinals)
7. (Brazil) André Ghem (final)
8. (Argentina) Agustín Velotti (champion)

== Draw ==
Key

- Q = Qualifier
- WC = Wild card
- LL = Lucky loser
- Alt = Alternate
- ITF = ITF entry
- PR = Protected ranking
- SR = Special ranking
- SE = Special exempt
- JE = Junior exempt
- JR = Junior Accelerator Programme entrant
- CO = College Accelerator Programme entrant
- NG = Next Gen Accelerator Program entrant
- w/o = Walkover
- r = Retired
- d = Defaulted

=== Finals ===
Semifinals
7/Alt	(Brazil) André Ghem	6	7^{7}
6	(Spain) Pere Riba	4	6^{5}
8	(Argentina) Agustín Velotti	6	0	6
2	(Argentina) Nicolás Kicker	3	6	4

Final
7/Alt	(Brazil) André Ghem	0	4
8	(Argentina) Agustín Velotti	6	6

=== Top half ===
First round
1	(Brazil) J Souza	6^{5}	4
(Brazil) D Dutra da Silva	7^{7}	6
(Ecuador) G Escobar	7^{10}	6
(Argentina) F Mena	6^{8}	1
(Brazil) R Hocevar	6^{6}	3
(Brazil) B Sant'anna	7^{8}	6
Q	(Brazil) Oscar José Gutierrez	2	0
7/Alt	(Brazil) A Ghem	6	6
3	(Spain) R Ramírez Hidalgo	4	6	6
(Chile) JC Sáez	6	3	4
(Brazil) C Zampieri	7^{7}	6
Q	(Brazil) Caio Silva	6^{2}	2
WC	(Brazil) I Marcondes	6	6
(Argentina) Maximiliano Estévez	4	1
(Sweden) C Lindell	4	1
6	(Spain) P Riba	6	6

Second round
(Brazil) D Dutra da Silva	5	6	3
(Ecuador) G Escobar	7	3	6
(Brazil) B Sant'anna	4	2
7/Alt	(Brazil) A Ghem	6	6
3	(Spain) R Ramírez Hidalgo	6	6
(Brazil) C Zampieri	3	1
WC	(Brazil) I Marcondes	7	3	2
6	(Spain) P Riba	5	6	6

Quarterfinals
(Ecuador) G Escobar	4	3
7/Alt	(Brazil) A Ghem	6	6
3	(Spain) R Ramírez Hidalgo	5	3
6	(Spain) P Riba	7	6

Semifinals
7/Alt	(Brazil) A Ghem	6	7^{7}
6	(Spain) P Riba	4	6^{5}

=== Bottom half ===
First round
8	(Argentina) A Velotti	7	6
(Brazil) J Pereira	5	1
WC	(Brazil) Rafael Camilo	1	6^{4}
(Dominican Republic) J Hernández	6	7^{7}
WC	(Brazil) Fernando Yamacita	0	1
(Argentina) JI Londero	6	6
Q	(France) G Mina	5	5
4/Alt	(Chile) G Lama	7	7
5	(Argentina) F Argüello	6	6
WC	(Brazil) E Russi Assumpção	2	0
(Ecuador) E Gómez	6	6
(Brazil) F Romboli	4	3
(Ecuador) R Quiroz	6	6
Q	(Brazil) F Neis	4	2
(Brazil) Carlos Eduardo Severino	3	1
2	(Argentina) N Kicker	6	6

Second round
8	(Argentina) A Velotti	6	6
(Dominican Republic) J Hernández	1	2
(Argentina) JI Londero	7	6
4/Alt	(Chile) G Lama	5	1
5	(Argentina) F Argüello	6^{3}	2
(Ecuador) E Gómez	7^{7}	6
(Ecuador) R Quiroz	6^{4}	6	6^{4}
2	(Argentina) N Kicker	7^{7}	1	7^{7}

Quarterfinals
8	(Argentina) A Velotti	3	6	6
(Argentina) JI Londero	6	3	2
(Ecuador) E Gómez	3	2
2	(Argentina) N Kicker	6	6

Semifinals
8	(Argentina) A Velotti	6	0	6
2	(Argentina) N Kicker	3	6	4
