= 2014 Taroii Open de Tênis – Doubles =

Doubles
- 2014 Taroii Open de Tênis

Final
- Champions: (Argentina) Máximo González (Argentina) Eduardo Schwank
- Runners-up: (Brazil) André Sá (Brazil) João Souza
- Score: 6–2, 6–3

Events
Singles	Doubles
← 2013 ·	Taroii Open de Tênis

James Duckworth and Pierre-Hugues Herbert were the defending champions, but decided not to compete.

Máximo González and Eduardo Schwank won the title, defeating André Sá and João Souza in the final, 6–2, 6–3.

== Seeds ==
1. (Brazil) André Sá / (Brazil) João Souza (final)
2. (Argentina) Máximo González / (Argentina) Eduardo Schwank (champions)
3. (Argentina) Diego Sebastián Schwartzman / (Argentina) Horacio Zeballos (first round)
4. (Argentina) Guillermo Durán / (Argentina) Renzo Olivo (semifinals)

== Draw ==
=== Key ===
- Q = Qualifier
- WC = Wild card
- LL = Lucky loser
- Alt = Alternate
- SE = Special exempt
- PR = Protected ranking
- ITF = ITF entry
- JE = Junior exempt
- w/o = Walkover
- r = Retired
- d = Defaulted
- SR = Special ranking

=== Draw ===
First round
1	(Brazil) A Sá (Brazil) J Souza	6	6
WC	(Brazil) E Dischinger (Brazil) E Russi	1	2
(Serbia) N Ćirić (Serbia) G Tošić	6	6
(Argentina) JI Londero (Argentina) A Molteni	4	2
3	(Argentina) DS Schwartzman (Argentina) H Zeballos	4	7^{7}	[5]
(Venezuela) R Maytín (Brazil) F Romboli	6	6^{4}	[10]
Alt	(Brazil) R Hocevar (Brazil) F Neis	4	6^{4}
(Argentina) F Argüello (Venezuela) D Souto	6	7^{7}
(Argentina) M Alund (Argentina) G Pella	6	7
(Brazil) M Demoliner (Brazil) A Ghem	4	5
(Argentina) G Andreozzi (Argentina) A Collarini	7	5	[8]
4	(Argentina) G Durán (Argentina) R Olivo	5	7	[10]
WC	(Brazil) T Fernandes (Brazil) B Sant'anna	6	6
(France) A Michon (Egypt) M Safwat	2	2
WC	(Brazil) Guilherme Galvão (Brazil) L Kirche	2	0
2	(Argentina) M González (Argentina) E Schwank	6	6

Quarterfinals
1	(Brazil) A Sá (Brazil) J Souza	6	6
(Serbia) N Ćirić (Serbia) G Tošić	3	2
(Venezuela) R Maytín (Brazil) F Romboli	4	6	[3]
(Argentina) F Argüello (Venezuela) D Souto	6	4	[10]
(Argentina) M Alund (Argentina) G Pella	6	3	[9]
4	(Argentina) G Durán (Argentina) R Olivo	4	6	[11]
WC	(Brazil) T Fernandes (Brazil) B Sant'anna	6	1	[3]
2	(Argentina) M González (Argentina) E Schwank	4	6	[10]

Semifinals
1	(Brazil) A Sá (Brazil) J Souza	7	1	[10]
(Argentina) F Argüello (Venezuela) D Souto	5	6	[8]
4	(Argentina) G Durán (Argentina) R Olivo	4	4
2	(Argentina) M González (Argentina) E Schwank	6	6

Final
1	(Brazil) A Sá (Brazil) J Souza	2	3
2	(Argentina) M González (Argentina) E Schwank	6	6
