= 2014 Taroii Open de Tênis – Singles =

Singles
- 2014 Taroii Open de Tênis

Final
- Champion: (Argentina) Facundo Argüello
- Runner-up: (Argentina) Diego Sebastian Schwartzman
- Score: 4–6, 6–0, 6–4

Events
Singles	Doubles
← 2013 ·	Taroii Open de Tênis

Last year's champion Rogério Dutra da Silva was not defending his title.

Facundo Argüello won the title, defeating Diego Sebastian Schwartzman in the final, 4–6, 6–0, 6–4.

== Seeds ==
1. (Slovenia) Blaž Rola (first round)
2. (Argentina) Facundo Argüello (champion)
3. (Argentina) Guido Pella (first round)
4. (Argentina) Horacio Zeballos (second round)
5. (Argentina) Diego Sebastian Schwartzman (final)
6. (Argentina) Guido Andreozzi (quarterfinals)
7. (Brazil) João Souza (semifinals)
8. (Argentina) Máximo González (first round)

== Draw ==
=== Key ===
- Q = Qualifier
- WC = Wild card
- LL = Lucky loser
- Alt = Alternate
- SE = Special exempt
- PR = Protected ranking
- ITF = ITF entry
- JE = Junior exempt
- w/o = Walkover
- r = Retired
- d = Defaulted
- SR = Special ranking

=== Finals ===
Semifinals
(Argentina) Andrés Molteni	6	4	2
5	(Argentina) Diego Sebastián Schwartzman	4	6	6
7/WC	(Brazil) João Souza	5	6^{3}
2	(Argentina) Facundo Argüello	7	7^{7}

Final
5	(Argentina) Diego Sebastián Schwartzman	6	0	4
2	(Argentina) Facundo Argüello	4	6	6

=== Top half ===
First round
1	(Slovenia) B Rola	4	3
(Argentina) M Alund	6	6
WC	(Brazil) T Fernandes	3	4
(Brazil) A Ghem	6	6
(Brazil) J Pereira	4	0
(Portugal) R Machado	6	6
(Argentina) A Molteni	7^{7}	4	6
8	(Argentina) M González	6^{5}	6	4
4	(Argentina) H Zeballos	6	6
(Brazil) F Romboli	1	2
(Argentina) A Collarini	5	4
(Belgium) K Coppejans	7	6
(France) TK Wang	6	6
(Venezuela) D Souto	2	2
(Brazil) T Monteiro	4	1
5	(Argentina) DS Schwartzman	6	6

Second round
(Argentina) M Alund	2	0
(Brazil) A Ghem	6	6
(Portugal) R Machado	6^{2}	6	6^{1}
(Argentina) A Molteni	7^{7}	1	7^{7}
4	(Argentina) H Zeballos	6	2	3
(Belgium) K Coppejans	1	6	6
(France) TK Wang	3	3
5	(Argentina) DS Schwartzman	6	6

Quarterfinals
(Brazil) A Ghem	4	5
(Argentina) A Molteni	6	7
(Belgium) K Coppejans	4	4
5	(Argentina) DS Schwartzman	6	6

Semifinals
(Argentina) A Molteni	6	4	2
5	(Argentina) DS Schwartzman	4	6	6

=== Bottom half ===
First round
7/WC	(Brazil) J Souza	6	6
Q	(Brazil) F Neis	3	4
(Portugal) G Elias	3	6	6
(Argentina) JI Londero	6	4	1
Q	(Brazil) T Turini	3	2
(France) A Michon	6	6
Q	(Argentina) E Schwank	2	6^{3}
3	(Argentina) G Pella	6	7^{7}
6	(Argentina) G Andreozzi	6	5	3
(Argentina) R Olivo	4	7	1^{r}
(Brazil) R Hocevar	6	5	6
WC	(Brazil) João Walendowsky	4	7	4
WC	(Brazil) E Russi	1	2
(Egypt) M Safwat	6	6
Q	(Brazil) B Sant'Anna	6	3	3
2	(Argentina) F Argüello	4	6	6

Second round
7/WC	(Brazil) J Souza	3	6	7
(Portugal) G Elias	6	3	5
(France) A Michon	6	4	6
3	(Argentina) G Pella	1	6	4
6	(Argentina) G Andreozzi	6	6
(Brazil) R Hocevar	4	1
(Egypt) M Safwat	1	7^{7}	1
2	(Argentina) F Argüello	6	6^{5}	6

Quarterfinals
7/WC	(Brazil) J Souza	6	6
(France) A Michon	0	2
6	(Argentina) G Andreozzi	1	2
2	(Argentina) F Argüello	6	6

Semifinals
7/WC	(Brazil) J Souza	5	6^{3}
2	(Argentina) F Argüello	7	7^{7}
