= 2016 Curitiba Challenger =

- Date: 29 August – 4 September
- Edition: 1st
- Surface: Clay
- Location: Curitiba, Brazil

Champions

Singles
- (Argentina) Agustín Velotti

Doubles
- (Spain) Rubén Ramírez Hidalgo / (Spain) Pere Riba
- Curitiba Challenger

The 2016 Curitiba Challenger was a professional tennis tournament played on clay courts. It was the first edition of the tournament which was part of the 2016 ATP Challenger Tour. It took place in Curitiba, Brazil between 29 August – 4 September 2016.

== Singles main-draw entrants ==
=== Seeds ===
Country	Player	Rank^{1}	Seed
BRA	João Souza	119	1
ARG	Nicolás Kicker	134	2
ESP	Rubén Ramírez Hidalgo	148	3
CHI	Gonzalo Lama	172	4
ARG	Facundo Argüello	196	5
ESP	Pere Riba	204	6
BRA	André Ghem	248	7
ARG	Agustín Velotti	257	8

- ^{1} Rankings are as of August 22, 2016.

=== Other entrants ===
The following players received wildcards into the singles main draw:

- (Brazil) Igor Marcondes
- (Brazil) Rafael Camilo
- (Brazil) Fernando Yamacita
- (Brazil) Eduardo Russi Assumpção

The following players received entry as an alternate into the singles main draw:

- (Brazil) André Ghem
- (Chile) Gonzalo Lama

The following players received entry from the qualifying draw:

- (France) Gianni Mina
- (Brazil) Caio Silva
- (Brazil) Fabrício Neis
- (Brazil) Oscar José Gutierrez

== Champions ==
=== Singles ===
- (Argentina) Agustín Velotti def. (Brazil) André Ghem, 6–0, 6–4.

=== Doubles ===
- (Spain) Rubén Ramírez Hidalgo / (Spain) Pere Riba def. (Brazil) André Ghem / (Brazil) Fabrício Neis, 6–7^{3–7}, 6–4, [10–7].
