= 2024 Curitiba Challenger – Singles =

Singles
- 2024 Curitiba Challenger

Final
- Champion: (Portugal) Jaime Faria
- Runner-up: (Brazil) Felipe Meligeni Alves
- Score: 6–4, 6–4

Events
Singles	Doubles
- Curitiba Challenger

Hugo Dellien was the defending champion but retired from his first round match against José Pereira.

Jaime Faria won the title after defeating Felipe Meligeni Alves 6–4, 6–4 in the final.

== Seeds ==
1. (Argentina) Camilo Ugo Carabelli (withdrew)
2. (Bolivia) Hugo Dellien (first round, retired)
3. (Colombia) Daniel Elahi Galán (first round)
4. (Argentina) Román Andrés Burruchaga (quarterfinals)
5. (Portugal) Jaime Faria (champion)
6. (Argentina) Juan Manuel Cerúndolo (semifinals)
7. (Portugal) Henrique Rocha (first round)
8. (Brazil) Felipe Meligeni Alves (final)
9. (Chile) Tomás Barrios Vera (second round)

== Draw ==
Key

- Q = Qualifier
- WC = Wild card
- LL = Lucky loser
- Alt = Alternate
- ITF = ITF entry
- PR = Protected ranking
- SR = Special ranking
- SE = Special exempt
- JE = Junior exempt
- JR = Junior Accelerator Programme entrant
- CO = College Accelerator Programme entrant
- NG = Next Gen Accelerator Program entrant
- w/o = Walkover
- r = Retired
- d = Defaulted

=== Finals ===
Semifinals
(Brazil) Gustavo Heide	4	3
5	(Portugal) Jaime Faria	6	6
8	(Brazil) Felipe Meligeni Alves	6	6
6	(Argentina) Juan Manuel Cerúndolo	4	0

Final
5	(Portugal) Jaime Faria	6	6
8	(Brazil) Felipe Meligeni Alves	4	4

=== Top half ===
First round
9	(Chile) T Barrios Vera	6	6
Q	(Argentina) G Villanueva	2	4
Q	(Brazil) O Luz	4	4
(Brazil) G Heide	6	6
Alt	(Brazil) M Alves	6	7^{7}
(Peru) G Bueno	3	6^{4}
(Brazil) K Sell	6	6
7	(Portugal) H Rocha	4	0
3	(Colombia) DE Galán	7^{7}	6^{2}	6^{8}
Alt	(Portugal) G Elias	6^{5}	7^{7}	7^{10}
(Paraguay) AD Vallejo	0	6	6
(Argentina) F Mena	6	0	3
Q	(Bolivia) JC Prado Ángelo	3	7	6^{4}
WC	(Brazil) M Pucinelli de Almeida	6	5	7^{7}
Q	(Argentina) LE Ambrogi	2	7	3
5	(Portugal) J Faria	6	5	6

Second round
9	(Chile) T Barrios Vera	3	6	1
(Brazil) G Heide	6	3	6
Alt	(Brazil) M Alves	7^{7}	3	7
(Brazil) K Sell	6^{5}	6	5
Alt	(Portugal) G Elias	5	6	2
(Paraguay) AD Vallejo	7	2	3^{r}
WC	(Brazil) M Pucinelli de Almeida	5	1
5	(Portugal) J Faria	7	6

Quarterfinals
(Brazil) G Heide	6	6^{5}	6
Alt	(Brazil) M Alves	3	7^{7}	2
Alt	(Portugal) G Elias	7	3	1
5	(Portugal) J Faria	5	6	6

Semifinals
(Brazil) G Heide	4	3
5	(Portugal) J Faria	6	6

=== Bottom half ===
First round
8	(Brazil) F Meligeni Alves	6	7^{8}
(Brazil) P Sakamoto	2	6^{6}
(Argentina) JP Ficovich	6	6
(Argentina) S Rodríguez Taverna	1	1
(Lebanon) H Habib	7^{7}	6
Q	(Argentina) L Midón	6^{4}	4
Alt	(Chile) M Soto	1	2
4	(Argentina) RA Burruchaga	6	6
6	(Argentina) JM Cerúndolo	6	7
(Peru) JP Varillas	3	5
(United States) T Boyer	6	6
WC	(Brazil) Wilson Leite	2	3
Q	(Brazil) JL Reis da Silva	6^{3}	4
(Ecuador) Á Guillén Meza	7^{7}	6
WC	(Brazil) J Pereira	6	3	4
2	(Bolivia) H Dellien	4	6	0^{r}

Second round
8	(Brazil) F Meligeni Alves	7^{9}	4	6
(Argentina) JP Ficovich	6^{7}	6	3
(Lebanon) H Habib	6^{4}	2
4	(Argentina) RA Burruchaga	7^{7}	6
6	(Argentina) JM Cerúndolo	6	6
(United States) T Boyer	4	4
(Ecuador) Á Guillén Meza	6	6
WC	(Brazil) J Pereira	1	1

Quarterfinals
8	(Brazil) F Meligeni Alves	6	4	6
4	(Argentina) RA Burruchaga	0	6	1
6	(Argentina) JM Cerúndolo	6	6
(Ecuador) Á Guillén Meza	3	4

Semifinals
8	(Brazil) F Meligeni Alves	6	6
6	(Argentina) JM Cerúndolo	4	0
