= 2013 Taroii Open de Tênis – Doubles =

Doubles
- 2013 Taroii Open de Tênis

Final
- Champions: (Australia) James Duckworth (France) Pierre-Hugues Herbert
- Runners-up: (Brazil) Guilherme Clezar (Brazil) Fabrício Neis
- Score: 7–5, 6–2

Events
Singles	Doubles
Taroii Open de Tênis	· 2014 →

James Duckworth and Pierre-Hugues Herbert won the first edition of the tournament 7–5, 6–2 in the final against Guilherme Clezar and Fabrício Neis.

== Seeds ==
1. (Croatia) Nikola Mektić / (Croatia) Antonio Veić (first round)
2. (Brazil) Guilherme Clezar / (Brazil) Fabrício Neis (final)
3. (Brazil) Daniel Dutra da Silva / (Brazil) Rogério Dutra da Silva (semifinals)
4. (Argentina) Guido Andreozzi / (Uruguay) Ariel Behar (first round)

== Draw ==
=== Key ===
- Q = Qualifier
- WC = Wild card
- LL = Lucky loser
- Alt = Alternate
- SE = Special exempt
- PR = Protected ranking
- ITF = ITF entry
- JE = Junior exempt
- w/o = Walkover
- r = Retired
- d = Defaulted
- SR = Special ranking

=== Draw ===
First round
1	(Croatia) N Mektić (Croatia) A Veić	3	6	[8]
(Argentina) G Durán (Argentina) A Velotti	6	2	[10]
(Brazil) T Alves (Brazil) A Laranja	6	6
WC	(Brazil) R Hocevar (Brazil) E Russi	1	2
4	(Argentina) G Andreozzi (Uruguay) A Behar	4	6^{6}
(Australia) J Duckworth (France) P-H Herbert	6	7^{8}
(Slovakia) P Červenák (Chile) H Podlipnik-Castillo	6	6
(Canada) S Diez (Spain) Marc Giner	2	3
(Argentina) A Collarini (Brazil) L Kirche	w/o
(Slovakia) J Kovalík (Russia) Alexander Lobkov
(Brazil) A Ghem (United States) D Kosakowski
3	(Brazil) D Dutra da Silva (Brazil) R Dutra da Silva	w/o
(Czech Republic) D Lojda (Serbia) B Pašanski	4	6	[8]
WC	(Brazil) João Lucas Menezes (Brazil) Leonardo Telles	6	3	[10]
WC	(Brazil) Alexandre Schnitman (Brazil) João Walendowsky	2	4
2	(Brazil) G Clezar (Brazil) F Neis	6	6

Quarterfinals
(Argentina) G Durán (Argentina) A Velotti	3	7^{7}	[3]
(Brazil) T Alves (Brazil) A Laranja	6	6^{4}	[10]
(Australia) J Duckworth (France) P-H Herbert	6	7^{7}
(Slovakia) P Červenák (Chile) H Podlipnik-Castillo	3	6^{1}
(Argentina) A Collarini (Brazil) L Kirche
3	(Brazil) D Dutra da Silva (Brazil) R Dutra da Silva	w/o
WC	(Brazil) JL Menezes (Brazil) L Telles	4	4
2	(Brazil) G Clezar (Brazil) F Neis	6	6

Semifinals
(Brazil) T Alves (Brazil) A Laranja	6	3	[6]
(Australia) J Duckworth (France) P-H Herbert	4	6	[10]
3	(Brazil) D Dutra da Silva (Brazil) R Dutra da Silva	1	1
2	(Brazil) G Clezar (Brazil) F Neis	6	6

Final
(Australia) J Duckworth (France) P-H Herbert	7	6
2	(Brazil) G Clezar (Brazil) F Neis	5	2
