= 2013 Taroii Open de Tênis =

- Date: 8 – 14 April
- Edition: 1st
- Draw: 32S / 16D
- Prize money: $35,000+H
- Surface: Clay
- Location: Itajaí, Brazil

Champions

Singles
- (Brazil) Rogério Dutra da Silva

Doubles
- (Australia) James Duckworth / (France) Pierre-Hugues Herbert
Taroii Open de Tênis	· 2014 →

The 2013 Taroii Open de Tênis was a professional tennis tournament played on clay courts. It was the first edition of the tournament which was part of the 2013 ATP Challenger Tour. It took place in Itajaí, Brazil between 8 and 14 April 2013.

== Singles main draw entrants ==
=== Seeds ===
Country	Player	Rank^{1}	Seed
BRA	Rogério Dutra da Silva	111	1
BRA	João Souza	113	2
POR	Gastão Elias	133	3
CRO	Antonio Veić	147	4
ARG	Guido Andreozzi	168	5
SRB	Boris Pašanski	170	6
BRA	Thiago Alves	179	7
ARG	Agustín Velotti	183	8

- ^{1} Rankings are as of April 1, 2013.

=== Other entrants ===
The following players received wildcards into the singles main draw:

- (Brazil) Eduardo Dischinger
- (Brazil) Rogério Dutra da Silva
- (Brazil) Guilherme Hadlich
- (Brazil) Bruno Sant'anna

The following players received entry from the qualifying draw:

- (Brazil) André Ghem
- (Argentina) Máximo González
- (Slovakia) Jozef Kovalík
- (France) Axel Michon

== Doubles main draw entrants ==
=== Seeds ===
Country	Player	Country	Player	Rank^{1}	Seed
CRO	Nikola Mektić	CRO	Antonio Veić	335	1
BRA	Guilherme Clezar	BRA	Fabrício Neis	476	2
BRA	Daniel Dutra da Silva	BRA	Rogério Dutra da Silva	528	3
ARG	Guido Andreozzi	URU	Ariel Behar	571	4

- ^{1} Rankings as of April 1, 2013.

=== Other entrants ===
The following pairs received wildcards into the doubles main draw:

- (Brazil) Ricardo Hocevar / (Brazil) Eduardo Russi
- (Brazil) João Lucas Menezes / (Brazil) Leonardo Telles
- (Brazil) Alexandre Schnitman / (Brazil) João Walendowsky

== Champions ==
=== Singles ===
- (Brazil) Rogério Dutra da Silva def. (Slovakia) Jozef Kovalík, 4–6, 6–3, 6–1

=== Doubles ===
- (Australia) James Duckworth / (France) Pierre-Hugues Herbert def. (Brazil) Guilherme Clezar / (Brazil) Fabrício Neis, 7–5, 6–2
