= 2023 Curitiba Challenger – Doubles =

Doubles
- 2023 Curitiba Challenger

Final
- Champions: (Argentina) Guido Andreozzi (Uruguay) Ignacio Carou
- Runners-up: (Ecuador) Diego Hidalgo (Colombia) Cristian Rodríguez
- Score: 6–4, 6–4

Events
Singles	Doubles
- Curitiba Challenger

Rubén Ramírez Hidalgo and Pere Riba were the defending champions from when the last tournament was held in 2016 but were unable to defend their title as they had both retired from professional tennis.

Guido Andreozzi and Ignacio Carou won the title after defeating Diego Hidalgo and Cristian Rodríguez 6–4, 6–4 in the final.

== Seeds ==
1. (Ecuador) Diego Hidalgo / (Colombia) Cristian Rodríguez (final)
2. (Bolivia) Boris Arias / (Brazil) Orlando Luz (quarterfinals)
3. (Brazil) Fernando Romboli / (Brazil) Marcelo Zormann (semifinals)
4. (Argentina) Guido Andreozzi / (Uruguay) Ignacio Carou (champions)

== Draw ==
Key

- Q = Qualifier
- WC = Wild card
- LL = Lucky loser
- Alt = Alternate
- ITF = ITF entry
- PR = Protected ranking
- SR = Special ranking
- SE = Special exempt
- JE = Junior exempt
- JR = Junior Accelerator Programme entrant
- CO = College Accelerator Programme entrant
- NG = Next Gen Accelerator Program entrant
- w/o = Walkover
- r = Retired
- d = Defaulted

First round
1	(Ecuador) D Hidalgo (Colombia) C Rodríguez	7^{7}	6
(Brazil) D Dutra da Silva (Brazil) P Sakamoto	6^{5}	2
PR	(United States) O Crawford (Colombia) A Urrea	6	2	[10]
WC	(Brazil) L Britto (Brazil) João Eduardo Schiessl	3	6	[12]
3	(Brazil) F Romboli (Brazil) M Zormann	6	6
(Australia) A Taylor (Argentina) G Villanueva	4	4
(Brazil) M Pucinelli de Almeida (Brazil) E Ribeiro	6	6
(Bolivia) M Dellien (Peru) A Huertas del Pino	4	2
WC	(Brazil) M Alves (Brazil) Gabriel Roveri Sidney	4	3
(Switzerland) L Margaroli (Argentina) S Rodríguez Taverna	6	6
(Argentina) RA Burruchaga (Argentina) JB Torres	6	2	[7]
4	(Argentina) G Andreozzi (Uruguay) I Carou	4	6	[10]
(Brazil) P Boscardin Dias (Brazil) JL Reis da Silva	5	6^{2}
(Portugal) G Elias (Spain) C Taberner	7	7^{7}
(Argentina) R Olivo (Argentina) TA Tirante	3	2
2	(Bolivia) B Arias (Brazil) O Luz	6	6

Quarterfinals
1	(Ecuador) D Hidalgo (Colombia) C Rodríguez	6	6
WC	(Brazil) L Britto (Brazil) JE Schiessl	3	4
3	(Brazil) F Romboli (Brazil) M Zormann	6	6
(Brazil) M Pucinelli de Almeida (Brazil) E Ribeiro	3	4
(Switzerland) L Margaroli (Argentina) S Rodríguez Taverna	3	2
4	(Argentina) G Andreozzi (Uruguay) I Carou	6	6
(Portugal) G Elias (Spain) C Taberner	6	6
2	(Bolivia) B Arias (Brazil) O Luz	4	2

Semifinals
1	(Ecuador) D Hidalgo (Colombia) C Rodríguez	6	6
3	(Brazil) F Romboli (Brazil) M Zormann	4	4
4	(Argentina) G Andreozzi (Uruguay) I Carou	w/o
(Portugal) G Elias (Spain) C Taberner

Final
1	(Ecuador) D Hidalgo (Colombia) C Rodríguez	4	4
4	(Argentina) G Andreozzi (Uruguay) I Carou	6	6
