= 2015 Challenger Ciudad de Guayaquil =

- Date: 2 November – 8 November
- Edition: 11th
- Surface: Clay
- Location: Guayaquil, Ecuador

Champions

Singles
- (Portugal) Gastão Elias

Doubles
- (Argentina) Guillermo Durán / (Argentina) Andrés Molteni
- Challenger Ciudad de Guayaquil

The 2015 Challenger Ciudad de Guayaquil was a professional tennis tournament played on clay courts. It was the eleventh edition of the tournament which was part of the 2015 ATP Challenger Tour. It took place in Guayaquil, Ecuador between November 2 and November 8, 2015.

== Singles main-draw entrants ==
=== Seeds ===
Country	Player	Rank^{1}	Seed
ARG	Diego Schwartzman	78	1
BIH	Damir Džumhur	80	2
ARG	Guido Pella	85	3
ARG	Facundo Argüello	121	4
ESP	Roberto Carballés Baena	123	5
BRA	Rogério Dutra Silva	124	6
BEL	Kimmer Coppejans	127	7
ARG	Carlos Berlocq	132	8

- ^{1} Rankings are as of October 26, 2015.

=== Other entrants ===
The following players received wildcards into the singles main draw:

- (Ecuador) Iván Endara
- (Ecuador) Gonzalo Escobar
- (Ecuador) Emilio Gómez
- (Ecuador) Roberto Quiroz

The following players entered the main draw as alternates:

- (Bosnia and Herzegovina) Damir Džumhur
- (Chile) Juan Carlos Sáez

The following players received entry from the qualifying draw:

- (Argentina) Guido Andreozzi
- (Austria) Michael Linzer
- (France) Axel Michon
- (Brazil) Thiago Monteiro

== Champions ==
=== Singles ===
- (Portugal) Gastão Elias def. (Argentina) Diego Schwartzman 6–0, 6–4

=== Doubles ===
- (Argentina) Guillermo Durán / (Argentina) Andrés Molteni def. (Portugal) Gastão Elias / (Brazil) Fabrício Neis 6–3, 6–4
