= 2024 Curitiba Challenger – Doubles =

Doubles
- 2024 Curitiba Challenger

Final
- Champions: (Brazil) Fernando Romboli (Chile) Matías Soto
- Runners-up: (Poland) Karol Drzewiecki (Poland) Piotr Matuszewski
- Score: 7–6^{(7–5)}, 7–6^{(7–4)}

Events
Singles	Doubles
- Curitiba Challenger

Guido Andreozzi and Ignacio Carou were the defending champions but only Carou chose to defend his title, partnering Román Andrés Burruchaga. They lost in the first round to Arklon and Conner Huertas del Pino.

Fernando Romboli and Matías Soto won the title after defeating Karol Drzewiecki and Piotr Matuszewski 7–6^{(7–5)}, 7–6^{(7–4)} in the final.

== Seeds ==
1. (Poland) Karol Drzewiecki / (Poland) Piotr Matuszewski (final)
2. (Bolivia) Boris Arias / (Bolivia) Federico Zeballos (semifinals)
3. (Brazil) Fernando Romboli / (Chile) Matías Soto (champions)
4. (Brazil) Mateus Alves / (Brazil) Orlando Luz (quarterfinals)

== Draw ==
Key

- Q = Qualifier
- WC = Wild card
- LL = Lucky loser
- Alt = Alternate
- ITF = ITF entry
- PR = Protected ranking
- SR = Special ranking
- SE = Special exempt
- JE = Junior exempt
- JR = Junior Accelerator Programme entrant
- CO = College Accelerator Programme entrant
- NG = Next Gen Accelerator Program entrant
- w/o = Walkover
- r = Retired
- d = Defaulted

=== Draw ===
First round
1	(Poland) K Drzewiecki (Poland) P Matuszewski	6	6^{3}	[11]
(Brazil) L Britto (Brazil) JL Reis da Silva	2	7^{7}	[9]
(Brazil) PA Saraiva dos Santos (Argentina) G Villanueva	6	6
WC	(Brazil) J Pereira (Brazil) Gabriel Roveri Sidney	2	3
4	(Brazil) M Alves (Brazil) O Luz	6	6
(Argentina) S Rodríguez Taverna (United States) Tennyson Whiting	3	4
(United Kingdom) S Duncan (United States) H Reese	3	3
(Brazil) F Meligeni Alves (Brazil) M Zormann	6	6
(Venezuela) LD Martínez (Argentina) F Mena	6	6
Alt	(Brazil) M Pucinelli de Almeida (Brazil) P Sakamoto	3	3
WC	(Brazil) Breno Braga (Brazil) Victor Braga	3	0
3	(Brazil) F Romboli (Chile) M Soto	6	6
PR	(Peru) A Huertas del Pino (Peru) C Huertas del Pino	7^{7}	7^{7}
(Argentina) RA Burruchaga (Uruguay) I Carou	6^{3}	6^{4}
(Argentina) V Aboian (Uruguay) F Roncadelli	6^{3}	3
2	(Bolivia) B Arias (Bolivia) F Zeballos	7^{7}	6

Quarterfinals
1	(Poland) K Drzewiecki (Poland) P Matuszewski	6	6
(Brazil) PA Saraiva dos Santos (Argentina) G Villanueva	3	3
4	(Brazil) M Alves (Brazil) O Luz	4	7	[6]
(Brazil) F Meligeni Alves (Brazil) M Zormann	6	5	[10]
(Venezuela) LD Martínez (Argentina) F Mena	3	1
3	(Brazil) F Romboli (Chile) M Soto	6	6
PR	(Peru) A Huertas del Pino (Peru) C Huertas del Pino	5	4
2	(Bolivia) B Arias (Bolivia) F Zeballos	7	6

Semifinals
1	(Poland) K Drzewiecki (Poland) P Matuszewski	7^{11}	6
(Brazil) F Meligeni Alves (Brazil) M Zormann	6^{9}	1
3	(Brazil) F Romboli (Chile) M Soto	6	6
2	(Bolivia) B Arias (Bolivia) F Zeballos	2	2

Final
1	(Poland) K Drzewiecki (Poland) P Matuszewski	6^{5}	6^{4}
3	(Brazil) F Romboli (Chile) M Soto	7^{7}	7^{7}
