= 2019 Internazionali di Tennis di Manerbio – Trofeo Dimmidisì =

- Date: 5–11 August
- Edition: 17th
- Location: Manerbio, Italy

Champions

Singles
- (Italy) Federico Gaio

Doubles
- (Brazil) Fabrício Neis / (Brazil) Fernando Romboli
- Internazionali di Tennis di Manerbio – Trofeo Dimmidisì

The 2019 Internazionali di Tennis di Manerbio – Trofeo Dimmidisì was a professional tennis tournament played on clay courts. It was the seventeenth edition of the tournament which was part of the 2019 ATP Challenger Tour. It took place in Manerbio, Italy between 5 and 11 August 2019.

== Singles main-draw entrants ==
=== Seeds ===
| Country | Player | Rank^{1} | Seed |
|---|---|---|---|
| ITA | Paolo Lorenzi | 114 | 1 |
| ITA | Lorenzo Giustino | 131 | 2 |
| BEL | Kimmer Coppejans | 133 | 3 |
| ARG | Federico Coria | 165 | 4 |
| ITA | Federico Gaio | 175 | 5 |
| ~~SRB~~ | ~~Nikola Milojević~~ | ~~180~~ | ~~6~~ |
| CRO | Viktor Galović | 221 | 7 |
| ITA | Andrea Arnaboldi | 225 | 8 |
| EGY | Mohamed Safwat | 235 | 9 |
| POR | Gonçalo Oliveira | 251 | 10 |
| CRO | Nino Serdarušić | 269 | 11 |
| POR | Frederico Ferreira Silva | 273 | 12 |
| RUS | Pavel Kotov | 287 | 13 |
| USA | Evan King | 301 | 14 |
| CHI | Alejandro Tabilo | 304 | 15 |
| ARG | Andrea Collarini | 305 | 16 |

- ^{1} Rankings are as of 29 July 2019.

=== Other entrants ===
The following players received wildcards into the singles main draw:

- (Italy) Gabriele Bosio
- (Croatia) Viktor Galović
- (Denmark) Holger Rune
- (Italy) Filippo Speziali
- (Italy) Samuel Vincent Ruggeri

The following players received entry into the singles main draw using protected rankings:

- (Colombia) Nicolás Barrientos
- (Spain) Íñigo Cervantes

The following players received entry into the singles main draw as using their ITF World Tennis Ranking:

- (Argentina) Francisco Cerúndolo
- (France) Sadio Doumbia
- (Argentina) Tomás Martín Etcheverry
- (Russia) Ivan Gakhov
- (Netherlands) Botic van de Zandschulp

The following players received entry from the qualifying draw:

- (Italy) Marco Bortolotti
- (France) Fabien Reboul

The following player received entry as a lucky loser:

- (Serbia) Nikola Čačić

== Champions ==
=== Singles ===
- (Italy) Federico Gaio def. (Italy) Paolo Lorenzi 6–3, 6–1.

=== Doubles ===
- (Brazil) Fabrício Neis / (Brazil) Fernando Romboli def. (France) Sadio Doumbia / (France) Fabien Reboul 6–4, 7–6^{(7–4)}.
