= 2013 Taroii Open de Tênis – Singles =

Singles
- 2013 Taroii Open de Tênis

Final
- Champion: (Brazil) Rogério Dutra da Silva
- Runner-up: (Slovakia) Jozef Kovalík
- Score: 4–6, 6–3, 6–1

Events
Singles	Doubles
Taroii Open de Tênis	· 2014 →

Rogério Dutra da Silva won the first edition of the tournament 4–6, 6–3, 6–1 in the final against Jozef Kovalík.

== Seeds ==
1. (Brazil) Rogério Dutra da Silva (champion)
2. (Brazil) João Souza (first round)
3. (Portugal) Gastão Elias (semifinals)
4. (Croatia) Antonio Veić (second round)
5. (Argentina) Guido Andreozzi (quarterfinals)
6. (Serbia) Boris Pašanski (first round)
7. (Brazil) Thiago Alves (second round)
8. (Argentina) Agustín Velotti (second round)

== Draw ==
=== Key ===
- Q = Qualifier
- WC = Wild card
- LL = Lucky loser
- Alt = Alternate
- SE = Special exempt
- PR = Protected ranking
- ITF = ITF entry
- JE = Junior exempt
- w/o = Walkover
- r = Retired
- d = Defaulted
- SR = Special ranking

=== Finals ===
Semifinals
1/WC	(Brazil) Rogério Dutra da Silva	6	6
3	(Portugal) Gastão Elias	1	0
(Canada) Steven Diez	6	1	3
Q	(Slovakia) Jozef Kovalík	4	6	6

Final
1/WC	(Brazil) Rogério Dutra da Silva	4	6	6
Q	(Slovakia) Jozef Kovalík	6	3	1

=== Top half ===
First round
1/WC	(Brazil) R Dutra da Silva	6	7
(Argentina) A Collarini	0	5
(Brazil) R Hocevar	6	6
(United States) D Kosakowski	2	2
(Brazil) G Clezar	3	6^{7}
(Bosnia and Herzegovina) A Šetkić	6	7^{9}
(France) P-H Herbert	4	6^{4}
5	(Argentina) G Andreozzi	6	7^{7}
3	(Portugal) G Elias	6	6
(Brazil) L Kirche	1	0
(Australia) J Duckworth	6	6
WC	(Brazil) Guilherme Hadlich	1	2
WC	(Brazil) B Sant'anna	6^{3}	2
(Spain) Marc Giner	7^{7}	6
WC	(Brazil) E Dischinger	2	5
7	(Brazil) T Alves	6	7

Second round
1/WC	(Brazil) R Dutra da Silva	3	6	6
(Brazil) R Hocevar	6	2	2
(Bosnia and Herzegovina) A Šetkić	6	3	1
5	(Argentina) G Andreozzi	4	6	6
3	(Portugal) G Elias	6^{5}	6	6
(Australia) J Duckworth	7^{7}	1	1
(Spain) M Giner	7^{7}	7
7	(Brazil) T Alves	6^{2}	5

Quarterfinals
1/WC	(Brazil) R Dutra da Silva	6	6
5	(Argentina) G Andreozzi	2	2
3	(Portugal) G Elias	6	6
(Spain) M Giner	2	0

Semifinals
1/WC	(Brazil) R Dutra da Silva	6	6
3	(Portugal) G Elias	1	0

=== Bottom half ===
First round
8	(Argentina) A Velotti	6	6
(Chile) H Podlipnik-Castillo	3	3
Q	(France) A Michon	6	6
Q	(Argentina) M González	3	3
(Russia) A Lobkov	6^{4}	3
(Canada) S Diez	7^{7}	6
(Slovakia) P Červenák	2	2
4	(Croatia) A Veić	6	6
6	(Serbia) B Pašanski	6	3	1
Q	(Slovakia) J Kovalík	4	6	6
(Portugal) R Machado	6	6
(Argentina) Leandro Migani	3	1
(Croatia) N Mektić	4	6	6
(Czech Republic) D Lojda	6	2	3
Q	(Brazil) A Ghem	6	4	6
2	(Brazil) J Souza	4	6	1

Second round
8	(Argentina) A Velotti	6	1	4
Q	(France) A Michon	1	6	6
(Canada) S Diez	0	7^{7}	6
4	(Croatia) A Veić	6	6^{5}	4
Q	(Slovakia) J Kovalík	6	6
(Portugal) R Machado	4	3
(Croatia) N Mektić	6	6
Q	(Brazil) A Ghem	4	0

Quarterfinals
Q	(France) A Michon	7^{7}	5	0
(Canada) S Diez	6^{5}	7	6
Q	(Slovakia) J Kovalík	4	6	6
(Croatia) N Mektić	6	3	2

Semifinals
(Canada) S Diez	6	1	3
Q	(Slovakia) J Kovalík	4	6	6
