= 2025 Curitiba Challenger – Singles =

Singles
- 2025 Curitiba Challenger

Final
- Champion: (Paraguay) Daniel Vallejo
- Runner-up: (Brazil) Pedro Boscardin Dias
- Score: 6–3, 7–5

Events
Singles	Doubles
- Curitiba Challenger

Jaime Faria was the defending champion but chose not to defend his title.

Daniel Vallejo won the title after defeating Pedro Boscardin Dias 6–3, 7–5 in the final.

== Seeds ==
1. (United States) Emilio Nava (first round)
2. (Argentina) Thiago Agustín Tirante (second round)
3. (Spain) Carlos Taberner (withdrew)
4. (Bolivia) Hugo Dellien (second round)
5. (Argentina) Román Andrés Burruchaga (semifinals)
6. (Chile) Tomás Barrios Vera (quarterfinals)
7. (Argentina) Juan Pablo Ficovich (first round)
8. (Argentina) Alex Barrena (first round)
9. (Brazil) Thiago Monteiro (second round)

== Draw ==
Key

- Q = Qualifier
- WC = Wild card
- LL = Lucky loser
- Alt = Alternate
- ITF = ITF entry
- PR = Protected ranking
- SR = Special ranking
- SE = Special exempt
- JE = Junior exempt
- JR = Junior Accelerator Programme entrant
- CO = College Accelerator Programme entrant
- NG = Next Gen Accelerator Program entrant
- w/o = Walkover
- r = Retired
- d = Defaulted

=== Finals ===
Semifinals
(Paraguay) Daniel Vallejo	6	6
WC	(Brazil) João Eduardo Schiessl	4	4
5	(Argentina) Román Andrés Burruchaga	6	2	4
Q	(Brazil) Pedro Boscardin Dias	2	6	6

Final
(Paraguay) Daniel Vallejo	6	7
Q	(Brazil) Pedro Boscardin Dias	3	5

=== Top half ===
First round
1	(United States) E Nava	2	3
(Paraguay) AD Vallejo	6	6
(Argentina) A Collarini	4	6	3
Alt	(Chile) M Soto	6	3	6
Q	(Colombia) Miguel Tobón	7	0	4
(Bolivia) M Dellien	5	6	6
(Brazil) JL Reis da Silva	6	4	2
6	(Chile) T Barrios Vera	3	6	6
4	(Bolivia) H Dellien	4	7^{8}	6
Q	(Brazil) M Alves	6	6^{6}	4
Q	(Greece) A Thanos	4	1
LL	(Brazil) D Dutra da Silva	6	6
Alt	(Brazil) M Pucinelli de Almeida	6	5	0
Q	(Mexico) A Hernández	4	7	6
WC	(Brazil) João Eduardo Schiessl	6	6
8	(Argentina) A Barrena	3	4

Second round
(Paraguay) AD Vallejo	6	6
Alt	(Chile) M Soto	3	2
(Bolivia) M Dellien	1	1
6	(Chile) T Barrios Vera	6	6
4	(Bolivia) H Dellien	6^{4}	2
LL	(Brazil) D Dutra da Silva	7^{7}	6
Q	(Mexico) A Hernández	3	7	4
WC	(Brazil) JE Schiessl	6	5	6

Quarterfinals
(Paraguay) AD Vallejo	6	6^{2}	6
6	(Chile) T Barrios Vera	3	7^{7}	3
LL	(Brazil) D Dutra da Silva	2	3
WC	(Brazil) JE Schiessl	6	6

Semifinals
(Paraguay) AD Vallejo	6	6
WC	(Brazil) JE Schiessl	4	4

=== Bottom half ===
First round
5	(Argentina) RA Burruchaga	6	6
WC	(Brazil) L Miguel	2	2
(Argentina) F Díaz Acosta	7	6
(Ecuador) Á Guillén Meza	5	1
Alt	(Spain) N Sánchez Izquierdo	0	6^{3}
(Peru) G Bueno	6	7^{7}
Alt	(Argentina) N Kicker	6	2	3
9	(Brazil) T Monteiro	3	6	6
7	(Argentina) JP Ficovich	6	4	4
(Mexico) R Pacheco Méndez	3	6	6
Q	(Brazil) G Heide	4	6	5
(Bolivia) JC Prado Ángelo	6	3	7
WC	(Brazil) E Ribeiro	1	6	6^{4}
Q	(Brazil) P Boscardin Dias	6	3	7^{7}
(Argentina) S Rodríguez Taverna	6	5	3
2	(Argentina) TA Tirante	4	7	6

Second round
5	(Argentina) RA Burruchaga	6	6
(Argentina) F Díaz Acosta	4	4
(Peru) G Bueno	7	6
9	(Brazil) T Monteiro	5	4
(Mexico) R Pacheco Méndez	6^{2}	3
(Bolivia) JC Prado Ángelo	7^{7}	6
Q	(Brazil) P Boscardin Dias	7^{9}	3	7
2	(Argentina) TA Tirante	6^{7}	6	5

Quarterfinals
5	(Argentina) RA Burruchaga	6	6
(Peru) G Bueno	1	1
(Bolivia) JC Prado Ángelo	4	4
Q	(Brazil) P Boscardin Dias	6	6

Semifinals
5	(Argentina) RA Burruchaga	6	2	4
Q	(Brazil) P Boscardin Dias	2	6	6
