= 2025 Curitiba Challenger – Doubles =

Doubles
- 2025 Curitiba Challenger

Final
- Champions: (Chile) Matías Soto (Bolivia) Federico Zeballos
- Runners-up: (Ecuador) Gonzalo Escobar (Mexico) Miguel Ángel Reyes-Varela
- Score: 6–4, 7–5

Events
Singles	Doubles
- Curitiba Challenger

Fernando Romboli and Matías Soto were the defending champions but only Soto chose to defend his title, partnering Federico Zeballos. He successfully defended his title after defeating Gonzalo Escobar and Miguel Ángel Reyes-Varela 6–4, 7–5 in the final.

== Seeds ==
1. (Ecuador) Gonzalo Escobar / (Mexico) Miguel Ángel Reyes-Varela (final)
2. (Argentina) Mariano Kestelboim / (Venezuela) Luis David Martínez (first round)
3. (Chile) Matías Soto / (Bolivia) Federico Zeballos (champions)
4. (Bolivia) Boris Arias / (Bolivia) Murkel Dellien (semifinals)

== Draw ==
Key

- Q = Qualifier
- WC = Wild card
- LL = Lucky loser
- Alt = Alternate
- ITF = ITF entry
- PR = Protected ranking
- SR = Special ranking
- SE = Special exempt
- JE = Junior exempt
- JR = Junior Accelerator Programme entrant
- CO = College Accelerator Programme entrant
- NG = Next Gen Accelerator Program entrant
- w/o = Walkover
- r = Retired
- d = Defaulted

=== Draw ===
First round
1	(Ecuador) G Escobar (Mexico) M Reyes-Varela	3	7^{7}	[10]
(Brazil) L Britto (Brazil) D Dutra da Silva	6	6^{5}	[6]
(Brazil) M Alves (Brazil) P Boscardin Dias
(Uruguay) I Carou (Argentina) S Rodríguez Taverna	w/o
4	(Bolivia) B Arias (Bolivia) M Dellien	6	3
(Spain) N Sánchez Izquierdo (Netherlands) M Vervoort	4	1^{r}
(Brazil) JL Reis da Silva (Brazil) Gabriel Roveri Sidney	6	6
(Mexico) R Pacheco Méndez (Paraguay) AD Vallejo	2	4
(Argentina) A Collarini (Argentina) N Kicker	7	6^{3}	[7]
WC	(Brazil) L Miguel (Brazil) J Pereira	5	7^{7}	[10]
WC	(Brazil) Ryan Augusto dos Santos (Brazil) João Eduardo Schiessl	6^{4}	2
3	(Chile) M Soto (Bolivia) F Zeballos	7^{7}	6
(Brazil) G Heide (Brazil) Bruno Oliveira	w/o
(Portugal) G Elias (Brazil) M Zormann
(Zimbabwe) CJ Lock (Brazil) PA Saraiva dos Santos	2	7^{7}	[12]
2	(Argentina) M Kestelboim (Venezuela) LD Martínez	6	6^{5}	[10]

Quarterfinals
1	(Ecuador) G Escobar (Mexico) M Reyes-Varela	6	6
(Uruguay) I Carou (Argentina) S Rodríguez Taverna	4	2
4	(Bolivia) B Arias (Bolivia) M Dellien	7	6
(Brazil) JL Reis da Silva (Brazil) G Roveri Sidney	5	1
WC	(Brazil) L Miguel (Brazil) J Pereira	2	1
3	(Chile) M Soto (Bolivia) F Zeballos	6	6
(Brazil) G Heide (Brazil) B Oliveira	6	6
(Zimbabwe) CJ Lock (Brazil) PA Saraiva dos Santos	3	2

Semifinals
1	(Ecuador) G Escobar (Mexico) M Reyes-Varela	7^{8}	6
4	(Bolivia) B Arias (Bolivia) M Dellien	6^{6}	3
3	(Chile) M Soto (Bolivia) F Zeballos	6	7^{7}
(Brazil) G Heide (Brazil) B Oliveira	1	6^{3}

Final
1	(Ecuador) G Escobar (Mexico) M Reyes-Varela	4	5
3	(Chile) M Soto (Bolivia) F Zeballos	6	7
