= 2026 Curitiba Challenger – Singles =

Singles
- 2026 Curitiba Challenger

Final
- Champion: (Argentina) Guido Iván Justo
- Runner-up: (Brazil) Gustavo Heide
- Score: 6–1, 6–4

Events
Singles	Doubles
- Curitiba Challenger

Daniel Vallejo was the defending champion but chose not to defend his title.

Guido Iván Justo won the title after defeating Gustavo Heide 6–1, 6–4 in the final.

== Seeds ==
1. (Brazil) Gustavo Heide (final)
2. (Chile) Tomás Barrios Vera (semifinals)
3. (Brazil) Thiago Seyboth Wild (withdrew)
4. (Bolivia) Juan Carlos Prado Ángelo (first round)
5. (Argentina) Lautaro Midón (quarterfinals)
6. (Argentina) Facundo Mena (first round, retired)
7. (Brazil) João Lucas Reis da Silva (second round)
8. (Argentina) Guido Iván Justo (champion)

== Draw ==
Key

- Q = Qualifier
- WC = Wild card
- LL = Lucky loser
- Alt = Alternate
- ITF = ITF entry
- PR = Protected ranking
- SR = Special ranking
- SE = Special exempt
- JE = Junior exempt
- JR = Junior Accelerator Programme entrant
- CO = College Accelerator Programme entrant
- NG = Next Gen Accelerator Program entrant
- w/o = Walkover
- r = Retired
- d = Defaulted

=== Finals ===
Semifinals
1	(Brazil) Gustavo Heide	6	6
(Brazil) Pedro Boscardin Dias	2	3
8	(Argentina) Guido Iván Justo	4	6	6
2	(Chile) Tomás Barrios Vera	6	4	3

Final
1	(Brazil) Gustavo Heide	1	4
8	(Argentina) Guido Iván Justo	6	6

=== Top half ===
First round
1	(Brazil) G Heide	6	6
Alt	(Argentina) H Casanova	2	1
PR	(Brazil) F Meligeni Alves	6	6
Alt	(Argentina) Carlos María Zárate	4	2
LL	(Brazil) Bruno Fernandez	6	1	6
LL	(Brazil) Wilson Leite	4	6	2
(Chile) M Soto	3	3
5	(Argentina) L Midón	6	6
Q	(Brazil) Victor Hugo Remondy Pagotto	4	2
(Brazil) P Boscardin Dias	6	6
WC	(Brazil) Lucas Andrade da Silva	6^{6}	6^{4}
(Argentina) GA Olivieri	7^{8}	7^{7}
Q	(Colombia) Samuel Heredia	4	5
WC	(Brazil) João Eduardo Schiessl	6	7
WC	(Brazil) G Miguel	6	2
6	(Argentina) F Mena	2	1^{r}

Second round
1	(Brazil) G Heide	6	6
PR	(Brazil) F Meligeni Alves	3	4
LL	(Brazil) B Fernandez	2	5
5	(Argentina) L Midón	6	7
(Brazil) P Boscardin Dias	6	6
(Argentina) GA Olivieri	4	2
WC	(Brazil) JE Schiessl	6^{4}	5
WC	(Brazil) G Miguel	7^{7}	7

Quarterfinals
1	(Brazil) G Heide	6	6
5	(Argentina) L Midón	2	4
(Brazil) P Boscardin Dias	6	5	6
WC	(Brazil) G Miguel	3	7	2

Semifinals
1	(Brazil) G Heide	6	6
(Brazil) P Boscardin Dias	2	3

=== Bottom half ===
First round
8	(Argentina) GI Justo	7^{8}	6
(Uruguay) F Roncadelli	6^{6}	2
Alt	(Brazil) E Ribeiro	3	4
Q	(Brazil) P Sakamoto	6	6
Q	(Brazil) J Pereira	2	6	4
Alt	(Brazil) M Alves	6	1	6
(Argentina) G Villanueva	3	6	6
4	(Bolivia) JC Prado Ángelo	6	3	4
7	(Brazil) JL Reis da Silva	6	7
Alt	(Bolivia) M Dellien	1	5
(Brazil) M Pucinelli de Almeida	3	6	6
Q	(Brazil) PA Saraiva dos Santos	6	3	0
NG	(Colombia) Miguel Tobón	2	6	1
(Argentina) JB Torres	6	3	6
Q	(Argentina) Lorenzo Joaquín Rodríguez	1	1
2	(Chile) T Barrios Vera	6	6

Second round
8	(Argentina) GI Justo	6	6
Q	(Brazil) P Sakamoto	2	4
Alt	(Brazil) M Alves	2	3
(Argentina) G Villanueva	6	6
7	(Brazil) JL Reis da Silva	3	6	3
(Brazil) M Pucinelli de Almeida	6	4	6
(Argentina) JB Torres	2	3
2	(Chile) T Barrios Vera	6	6

Quarterfinals
8	(Argentina) GI Justo	6	6
(Argentina) G Villanueva	2	4
(Brazil) M Pucinelli de Almeida	1	6	3
2	(Chile) T Barrios Vera	6	3	6

Semifinals
8	(Argentina) GI Justo	4	6	6
2	(Chile) T Barrios Vera	6	4	3
