= 2026 Curitiba Challenger – Doubles =

Doubles
- 2026 Curitiba Challenger

Final
- Champions: (Argentina) Mariano Kestelboim (Brazil) Marcelo Zormann
- Runners-up: (Brazil) Guto Miguel (Brazil) Eduardo Ribeiro
- Score: 5–7, 7–6^{(7–3)}, [10–7]

Events
Singles	Doubles
- Curitiba Challenger

Matías Soto and Federico Zeballos were the defending champions but withdrew from the tournament before their first round match.

Mariano Kestelboim and Marcelo Zormann won the title after defeating Guto Miguel and Eduardo Ribeiro 5–7, 7–6^{(7–3)}, [10–7] in the final.

== Seeds ==
1. (Argentina) Mariano Kestelboim / (Brazil) Marcelo Zormann (champions)
2. (Brazil) Guto Miguel / (Brazil) Eduardo Ribeiro (final)
3. (Chile) Matías Soto / (Bolivia) Federico Zeballos (withdrew)
4. (Bolivia) Boris Arias / (Uruguay) Ignacio Carou (semifinals)

== Draw ==
Key

- Q = Qualifier
- WC = Wild card
- LL = Lucky loser
- Alt = Alternate
- ITF = ITF entry
- PR = Protected ranking
- SR = Special ranking
- SE = Special exempt
- JE = Junior exempt
- JR = Junior Accelerator Programme entrant
- CO = College Accelerator Programme entrant
- NG = Next Gen Accelerator Program entrant
- w/o = Walkover
- r = Retired
- d = Defaulted

First round
1	(Argentina) M Kestelboim (Brazil) M Zormann	w/o
(Brazil) Lucas Andrade da Silva (Brazil) G Heide
(Argentina) S de la Fuente (Argentina) GA Olivieri	5	3
(Venezuela) B Pérez (Brazil) PA Saraiva dos Santos	7	6
Alt	(Colombia) Samuel Heredia (Colombia) Miguel Tobón	7	6
(United States) Ryan Dickerson (Argentina) Lorenzo Joaquín Rodríguez	5	0
(Brazil) Bruno Oliveira (Brazil) Natan Rodrigues	6	6
Alt	(Brazil) Breno Braga (Brazil) Victor Braga	3	4
(Uruguay) F Roncadelli (Argentina) G Villanueva	6^{4}	6	[10]
(Brazil) M Alves (Brazil) JVC Loureiro	7^{7}	2	[6]
WC	(Brazil) Bruno Milani (Brazil) Augusto Scheidt	4	3
4	(Bolivia) B Arias (Uruguay) I Carou	6	6
WC	(Brazil) Henrique Pissetti Vialle (Brazil) Leonardo Storck França	4	6	[10]
(Brazil) J Pereira (Brazil) P Sakamoto	6	2	[5]
(Brazil) Victor Hugo Remondy Pagotto (Brazil) Gabriel Roveri Sidney	6	4	[6]
2	(Brazil) G Miguel (Brazil) E Ribeiro	4	6	[10]

Quarterfinals
1	(Argentina) M Kestelboim (Brazil) M Zormann	6	6
(Venezuela) B Pérez (Brazil) PA Saraiva dos Santos	2	2
Alt	(Colombia) S Heredia (Colombia) M Tobón	7	4	[10]
(Brazil) B Oliveira (Brazil) N Rodrigues	5	6	[7]
(Uruguay) F Roncadelli (Argentina) G Villanueva	2	2
4	(Bolivia) B Arias (Uruguay) I Carou	6	6
WC	(Brazil) H Pissetti Vialle (Brazil) L Storck França	3	4
2	(Brazil) G Miguel (Brazil) E Ribeiro	6	6

Semifinals
1	(Argentina) M Kestelboim (Brazil) M Zormann	w/o
Alt	(Colombia) S Heredia (Colombia) M Tobón
4	(Bolivia) B Arias (Uruguay) I Carou	4	4
2	(Brazil) G Miguel (Brazil) E Ribeiro	6	6

Final
1	(Argentina) M Kestelboim (Brazil) M Zormann	5	7^{7}	[10]
2	(Brazil) G Miguel (Brazil) E Ribeiro	7	6^{3}	[7]
