= 2014 Taroii Open de Tênis =

- Date: 7 – 13 April
- Edition: 2nd
- Draw: 32S / 16D
- Prize money: $35,000+H
- Surface: Clay
- Location: Itajaí, Brazil

Champions

Singles
- (Argentina) Facundo Argüello

Doubles
- (Argentina) Máximo González / (Argentina) Eduardo Schwank
← 2013 ·	Taroii Open de Tênis	· 2015 →

The 2014 Taroii Open de Tênis was a professional tennis tournament played on clay courts. It was the second edition of the tournament which was part of the 2014 ATP Challenger Tour. It took place in Itajaí, Brazil between 7 and 13 April 2013.

== Singles main-draw entrants ==
=== Seeds ===
Country	Player	Rank	Seed
SVN	Blaž Rola	118	1
ARG	Facundo Argüello	122	2
ARG	Guido Pella	126	3
ARG	Horacio Zeballos	127	4
ARG	Diego Sebastian Schwartzman	128	5
ARG	Guido Andreozzi	139	6
BRA	João Souza	140	7
ARG	Máximo González	159	8

=== Other entrants ===
The following players received wildcards into the singles main draw:

- (Brazil) Tiago Fernandes
- (Brazil) João Souza
- (Brazil) Joáo Walendowsky
- (Brazil) Eduardo Russi

The following players received entry from the qualifying draw:

- (Brazil) Fabrício Neis
- (Brazil) Thales Turini
- (Argentina) Eduardo Schwank
- (Brazil) Bruno Sant'anna

== Doubles main-draw entrants ==
=== Seeds ===
Country	Player	Country	Player	Rank	Seed
BRA	André Sá	BRA	João Souza	260	1
ARG	Máximo González	ARG	Eduardo Schwank	263	2
ARG	Diego Sebastian Schwartzman	ARG	Horacio Zeballos	340	3
ARG	Guillermo Durán	ARG	Renzo Olivo	364	4

=== Other entrants ===
The following pairs received wildcards into the doubles main draw:

- (Brazil) Eduardo Dischinger / (Brazil) Eduardo Russi
- (Brazil) Tiago Fernandes / (Brazil) Bruno Sant'anna
- (Brazil) Guilherme Galvão / (Brazil) Leonardo Kirche

== Champions ==
=== Singles ===
- (Argentina) Facundo Argüello def. (Argentina) Diego Sebastián Schwartzman, 4–6, 6–0, 6–4

=== Doubles ===
- (Argentina) Máximo González / (Argentina) Eduardo Schwank def. (Brazil) André Sá / (Brazil) João Souza, 6–2, 6–3
