= 2016 Curitiba Challenger – Doubles =

Doubles
- 2016 Curitiba Challenger

Final
- Champion: (Spain) Rubén Ramírez Hidalgo (Spain) Pere Riba
- Runner-up: (Brazil) André Ghem (Brazil) Fabrício Neis
- Score: 6–7^{(3–7)}, 6–4, [10–7]

Events
Singles	Doubles
- Curitiba Challenger

This was the first edition of the tournament.

Rubén Ramírez Hidalgo and Pere Riba won the title after defeating André Ghem and Fabrício Neis 6–7^{(3–7)}, 6–4, [10–7] in the final.

== Seeds ==
1. (Brazil) André Ghem / (Brazil) Fabrício Neis (final)
2. (Argentina) Facundo Argüello / (Argentina) Nicolás Kicker (first round)
3. (Brazil) Fernando Romboli / (Brazil) Caio Zampieri (quarterfinals)
4. (Brazil) José Pereira / (Brazil) Alexandre Tsuchiya (first round)

== Draw ==
Key

- Q = Qualifier
- WC = Wild card
- LL = Lucky loser
- Alt = Alternate
- ITF = ITF entry
- PR = Protected ranking
- SR = Special ranking
- SE = Special exempt
- JE = Junior exempt
- JR = Junior Accelerator Programme entrant
- CO = College Accelerator Programme entrant
- NG = Next Gen Accelerator Program entrant
- w/o = Walkover
- r = Retired
- d = Defaulted

First round
1	(Brazil) A Ghem (Brazil) F Neis	6	6
(Brazil) R Hocevar (Brazil) A Miele	2	0
WC	(Brazil) D Dutra da Silva (Brazil) E Russi Assumpção	4	6	[10]
WC	(Brazil) I Marcondes (Brazil) R Matos	6	3	[5]
4	(Brazil) J Pereira (Brazil) Alexandre Tsuchiya	2	1
(Ecuador) G Escobar (Chile) JC Sáez	6	6
Alt	(Brazil) Oscar José Gutierrez (Brazil) Caio Silva	4	4
(Sweden) C Lindell (Brazil) Carlos Eduardo Severino	6	6
(Spain) R Ramírez Hidalgo (Spain) P Riba	6	7
(Chile) G Lama (Brazil) B Sant'Anna	3	5
(Argentina) Maximiliano Estévez (Dominican Republic) J Hernández	1	6	[6]
3	(Brazil) F Romboli (Brazil) C Zampieri	6	4	[10]
(Argentina) JI Londero (Argentina) A Velotti	2	7	[7]
WC	(Brazil) Rafael Camilo (Brazil) Tiago Lopes	6	5	[10]
(Ecuador) E Gómez (Ecuador) R Quiroz	6	1	[10]
2	(Argentina) F Argüello (Argentina) N Kicker	2	6	[5]

Quarterfinals
1	(Brazil) A Ghem (Brazil) F Neis	5	6	[10]
WC	(Brazil) D Dutra da Silva (Brazil) E Russi Assumpção	7	4	[8]
(Ecuador) G Escobar (Chile) JC Sáez	3	1
(Sweden) C Lindell (Brazil) CE Severino	6	6
(Spain) R Ramírez Hidalgo (Spain) P Riba	6	7
3	(Brazil) F Romboli (Brazil) C Zampieri	3	5
WC	(Brazil) R Camilo (Brazil) T Lopes	7	2	[3]
(Ecuador) E Gómez (Ecuador) R Quiroz	5	6	[10]

Semifinals
1	(Brazil) A Ghem (Brazil) F Neis	6	6
(Sweden) C Lindell (Brazil) CE Severino	3	2
(Spain) R Ramírez Hidalgo (Spain) P Riba	6	6
(Ecuador) E Gómez (Ecuador) R Quiroz	3	2

Final
1	(Brazil) A Ghem (Brazil) F Neis	7^{7}	4	[7]
(Spain) R Ramírez Hidalgo (Spain) P Riba	6^{3}	6	[10]
