= 2023 Curitiba Challenger – Singles =

Singles
- 2023 Curitiba Challenger

Final
- Champion: (Bolivia) Hugo Dellien
- Runner-up: (United States) Oliver Crawford
- Score: 7–6^{(8–6)}, 4–6, 7–6^{(7–1)}

Events
| Singles | Doubles |
- Curitiba Challenger

Agustín Velotti was the defending champion from when the tournament was last held in 2016 but didn't defend his title as he retired from professional tennis.

Hugo Dellien won the title after defeating Oliver Crawford 7–6^{(8–6)}, 4–6, 7–6^{(7–1)} in the final.

== Seeds ==
1. (Argentina) Juan Manuel Cerúndolo (first round)
2. (Argentina) Thiago Agustín Tirante (second round)
3. (Argentina) Francisco Comesaña (second round)
4. (Czech Republic) Vít Kopřiva (first round)
5. (Bolivia) Hugo Dellien (champion)
6. (Brazil) Felipe Meligeni Alves (second round)
7. (Argentina) Mariano Navone (withdrew)
8. (Argentina) Camilo Ugo Carabelli (second round)
9. (Italy) Luciano Darderi (semifinals)

== Draw ==
Key

- Q = Qualifier
- WC = Wild card
- LL = Lucky loser
- Alt = Alternate
- ITF = ITF entry
- PR = Protected ranking
- SR = Special ranking
- SE = Special exempt
- JE = Junior exempt
- JR = Junior Accelerator Programme entrant
- CO = College Accelerator Programme entrant
- NG = Next Gen Accelerator Program entrant
- w/o = Walkover
- r = Retired
- d = Defaulted

=== Finals ===
Semifinals
5 | (Bolivia) Hugo Dellien | 6^{5} | 6 | 6
(Argentina) Guido Andreozzi | 7^{7} | 2 | 3
9 | (Italy) Luciano Darderi | 2 | 3
(United States) Oliver Crawford | 6 | 6

Final
5 | (Bolivia) Hugo Dellien | 7^{8} | 4 | 7^{7}
(United States) Oliver Crawford | 6^{6} | 6 | 6^{1}

=== Top half ===
First round
1 | (Argentina) JM Cerúndolo | 3 | 5
WC | (Brazil) Wilson Leite | 6 | 7
Q | (Brazil) M Alves | 7^{7} | 3 | 4
(Argentina) S Rodríguez Taverna | 6^{2} | 6 | 6
(Brazil) JL Reis da Silva | 6 | 6
Q | (Peru) A Huertas del Pino | 4 | 4
(Brazil) E Ribeiro | 4 | 4
5 | (Bolivia) H Dellien | 6 | 6
4 | (Czech Republic) V Kopřiva | 0 | 6^{4}
(Austria) L Neumayer | 6 | 7^{7}
(Argentina) RA Burruchaga | 6 | 6
WC | (Brazil) Gustavo Ribeiro de Almeida | 4 | 1
Q | (Brazil) Gilbert Klier Júnior | 2 | 0
(Argentina) G Andreozzi | 6 | 6
Q | (Brazil) D Dutra da Silva | 6^{6} | 1
8 | (Argentina) C Ugo Carabelli | 7^{8} | 6

Second round
WC | (Brazil) W Leite | 6^{3} | 4
(Argentina) S Rodríguez Taverna | 7^{7} | 6
(Brazil) JL Reis da Silva | 2 | 3
5 | (Bolivia) H Dellien | 6 | 6
(Austria) L Neumayer | 5 | 3
(Argentina) RA Burruchaga | 7 | 6
(Argentina) G Andreozzi | 6 | 7^{7}
8 | (Argentina) C Ugo Carabelli | 2 | 6^{4}

Quarterfinals
(Argentina) S Rodríguez Taverna | 2 | 3
5 | (Bolivia) H Dellien | 6 | 6
(Argentina) RA Burruchaga | 4 | 5
(Argentina) G Andreozzi | 6 | 7

Semifinals
5 | (Bolivia) H Dellien | 6^{5} | 6 | 6
(Argentina) G Andreozzi | 7^{7} | 2 | 3

=== Bottom half ===
First round
9 | (Italy) L Darderi | 6^{5} | 6 | 6
(Argentina) JP Ficovich | 7^{7} | 2 | 1
Q | (Brazil) P Boscardin Dias | 6^{5} | 2
(Argentina) R Olivo | 7^{7} | 6
WC | (Brazil) O Luz | 6 | 7
(Bolivia) M Dellien | 1 | 5
Q | (Brazil) Nicolas Zanellato | 4 | 4
3 | (Argentina) F Comesaña | 6 | 6
6 | (Brazil) F Meligeni Alves | 7^{8} | 6
(United States) B Kuzuhara | 6^{6} | 4
(United States) O Crawford | 6 | 6
(Argentina) JB Torres | 1 | 3
Alt | (Spain) C Taberner | 2 | 6 | 6^{6}
(Czech Republic) D Svrčina | 6 | 2 | 7^{8}
(Brazil) M Pucinelli de Almeida | 2 | 6 | 1
2 | (Argentina) TA Tirante | 6 | 3 | 6

Second round
9 | (Italy) L Darderi | 6 | 6
(Argentina) R Olivo | 4 | 4
WC | (Brazil) O Luz | 6 | 6
3 | (Argentina) F Comesaña | 1 | 4
6 | (Brazil) F Meligeni Alves | 6 | 5 | 4
(United States) O Crawford | 3 | 7 | 6
(Czech Republic) D Svrčina | 6 | 7^{8}
2 | (Argentina) TA Tirante | 4 | 6^{6}

Quarterfinals
9 | (Italy) L Darderi | 6 | 6
WC | (Brazil) O Luz | 4 | 0
(United States) O Crawford | 7^{8} | 2 | 6
(Czech Republic) D Svrčina | 6^{6} | 6 | 1

Semifinals
9 | (Italy) L Darderi | 2 | 3
(United States) O Crawford | 6 | 6
