= 2015 Challenger Ciudad de Guayaquil – Singles =

Singles
- 2015 Challenger Ciudad de Guayaquil

Final
- Champion: (Portugal) Gastão Elias
- Runner-up: (Argentina) Diego Schwartzman
- Score: 6–0, 6–4

Events
Singles	Doubles
- Challenger Ciudad de Guayaquil

Gastão Elias won the title, beating Diego Schwartzman 6–0, 6–4

== Seeds ==
1. (Argentina) Diego Schwartzman (final)
2. (Bosnia and Herzegovina) Damir Džumhur (second round)
3. (Argentina) Guido Pella (semifinals)
4. (Argentina) Facundo Argüello (second round)
5. (Spain) Roberto Carballés Baena (second round)
6. (Brazil) Rogério Dutra Silva (first round, retired)
7. (Belgium) Kimmer Coppejans (first round)
8. (Argentina) Carlos Berlocq (first round)

== Draw ==
Key

- Q = Qualifier
- WC = Wild card
- LL = Lucky loser
- Alt = Alternate
- ITF = ITF entry
- PR = Protected ranking
- SR = Special ranking
- SE = Special exempt
- JE = Junior exempt
- JR = Junior Accelerator Programme entrant
- CO = College Accelerator Programme entrant
- NG = Next Gen Accelerator Program entrant
- w/o = Walkover
- r = Retired
- d = Defaulted

=== Finals ===
Semifinals
1	(Argentina) Diego Schwartzman	4	6	6
(Argentina) Marco Trungelliti	6	3	2
3	(Argentina) Guido Pella	4	6	3
(Portugal) Gastão Elias	6	3	6

Finals
1	(Argentina) Diego Schwartzman	0	4
(Portugal) Gastão Elias	6	6

=== Top half ===
First round
1	(Argentina) D Schwartzman	7^{7}	6
(United Kingdom) J Ward	6^{4}	3
(Austria) D Novak	6	6
Alt	(Chile) JC Sáez	4	2
WC	(Ecuador) I Endara	2	2
(Ecuador) G Lapentti	6	6
Q	(Argentina) G Andreozzi	6	6
8	(Argentina) C Berlocq	2	2
4	(Argentina) F Argüello	7	4	6
(Dominican Republic) J Hernández	5	6	4
WC	(Ecuador) G Escobar	6^{4}	2
(Argentina) N Kicker	7^{7}	6
(Italy) R Bellotti	1	6	0^{r}
(Argentina) P Cachin	6	4	4
(Argentina) M Trungelliti	7	3
6	(Brazil) R Dutra Silva	5	0^{r}

Second round
1	(Argentina) D Schwartzman	7^{8}	3	7
(Austria) D Novak	6^{6}	6	5
(Ecuador) G Lapentti	3	2
Q	(Argentina) G Andreozzi	6	6
4	(Argentina) F Argüello	4	3
(Argentina) N Kicker	6	6
(Argentina) P Cachin	6^{4}	1
(Argentina) M Trungelliti	7^{7}	6

Quarterfinals
1	(Argentina) D Schwartzman	6^{3}	7	7
Q	(Argentina) G Andreozzi	7^{7}	5	5
(Argentina) N Kicker	4	6^{4}
(Argentina) M Trungelliti	6	7^{7}

Semifinals
1	(Argentina) D Schwartzman	4	6	6
(Argentina) M Trungelliti	6	3	2

=== Bottom half ===
First round
5	(Spain) R Carballés Baena	7^{7}	7
WC	(Ecuador) E Gómez	6^{6}	5
Q	(France) A Michon	4	0
Q	(Brazil) T Monteiro	6	6
WC	(Ecuador) R Quiroz	3	7^{7}	6^{12}
Q	(Austria) M Linzer	6	6^{3}	7^{14}
(Brazil) G Clezar	1	6	3
3	(Argentina) G Pella	6	3	6
7	(Belgium) K Coppejans	7	4	5
(Portugal) G Elias	5	6	7
(Sweden) C Lindell	3	2
(Brazil) A Ghem	6	6
(Argentina) R Olivo	6^{4}	5
(Argentina) F Bagnis	7^{7}	7
(France) M Bourgue	0	2
2/Alt	(Bosnia and Herzegovina) D Džumhur	6	6

Second round
5	(Spain) R Carballés Baena	1	6	3
Q	(Brazil) T Monteiro	6	2	6
Q	(Austria) M Linzer	3	0
3	(Argentina) G Pella	6	6
(Portugal) G Elias	6^{5}	7	7^{11}
(Brazil) A Ghem	7^{7}	5	6^{9}
(Argentina) F Bagnis	6	6
2/Alt	(Bosnia and Herzegovina) D Džumhur	4	3

Quarterfinals
Q	(Brazil) T Monteiro	6^{6}	0^{r}
3	(Argentina) G Pella	7^{8}	4
(Portugal) G Elias	6	6
(Argentina) F Bagnis	2	2

Semifinals
3	(Argentina) G Pella	4	6	3
(Portugal) G Elias	6	3	6
