= 2019 Città di Como Challenger – Doubles =

Doubles
- 2019 Città di Como Challenger

Final
- Champions: (Germany) Andre Begemann (Romania) Florin Mergea
- Runners-up: (Brazil) Fabrício Neis (Portugal) Pedro Sousa
- Score: 5–7, 7–5, [14–12]

Events
Singles	Doubles
- Città di Como Challenger

Andre Begemann and Dustin Brown were the defending champions but only Begemann chose to defend his title, partnering Florin Mergea.

Begemann successfully defended his title, defeating Fabrício Neis and Pedro Sousa 5–7, 7–5, [14–12] in the final.

== Seeds ==
1. (Croatia) Antonio Šančić / (Austria) Tristan-Samuel Weissborn (quarterfinals)
2. (Uruguay) Ariel Behar / (Ecuador) Gonzalo Escobar (quarterfinals)
3. (Switzerland) Marc-Andrea Hüsler / (Chile) Hans Podlipnik Castillo (first round)
4. (Italy) Andrea Vavassori / (Spain) David Vega Hernández (first round)

== Draw ==
Key

- Q = Qualifier
- WC = Wild card
- LL = Lucky loser
- Alt = Alternate
- ITF = ITF entry
- PR = Protected ranking
- SR = Special ranking
- SE = Special exempt
- JE = Junior exempt
- JR = Junior Accelerator Programme entrant
- CO = College Accelerator Programme entrant
- NG = Next Gen Accelerator Program entrant
- w/o = Walkover
- r = Retired
- d = Defaulted

First round
1	(Croatia) A Šančić (Austria) T-S Weissborn	6	6
WC	(Spain) D Gimeno Traver (France) S Robert	4	3
(Croatia) A Pavić (Slovenia) B Rola	4	4
WC	(Italy) A Arnaboldi (Italy) F Arnaboldi	6	6
3	(Switzerland) M-A Hüsler (Chile) H Podlipnik Castillo	2	3
(Argentina) F Bagnis (Brazil) F Romboli	6	6
(Germany) A Begemann (Romania) F Mergea	7	6
(Italy) S Caruso (Italy) A Giannessi	5	3
WC	(Italy) Riccardo Balzerani (Italy) F Forti	1	4
Alt	(France) S Doumbia (France) F Reboul	6	6
(Italy) S Bolelli (Italy) A Pellegrino	7	6
4	(Italy) A Vavassori (Spain) D Vega Hernández	5	1
(Brazil) F Neis (Portugal) P Sousa	6	6
(Peru) S Galdós (Slovakia) A Martin	3	1
(Monaco) R Arneodo (Italy) J Ocleppo	1	6	[5]
2	(Uruguay) A Behar (Ecuador) G Escobar	6	4	[10]

Quarterfinals
1	(Croatia) A Šančić (Austria) T-S Weissborn	6^{5}	5
WC	(Italy) A Arnaboldi (Italy) F Arnaboldi	7^{7}	7
(Argentina) F Bagnis (Brazil) F Romboli	6	4	[8]
(Germany) A Begemann (Romania) F Mergea	1	6	[10]
Alt	(France) S Doumbia (France) F Reboul	7^{8}	6
(Italy) S Bolelli (Italy) A Pellegrino	6^{6}	4
(Brazil) F Neis (Portugal) P Sousa	6	3	[13]
2	(Uruguay) A Behar (Ecuador) G Escobar	4	6	[11]

Semifinals
WC	(Italy) A Arnaboldi (Italy) F Arnaboldi	2	3
(Germany) A Begemann (Romania) F Mergea	6	6
Alt	(France) S Doumbia (France) F Reboul	3	7^{8}	[9]
(Brazil) F Neis (Portugal) P Sousa	6	6^{6}	[11]

Final
(Germany) A Begemann (Romania) F Mergea	5	7	[14]
(Brazil) F Neis (Portugal) P Sousa	7	5	[12]
