= 2019 Internazionali di Tennis di Manerbio – Trofeo Dimmidisì – Doubles =

Trofeo Dimmidisì – Doubles
- 2019 Internazionali di Tennis di Manerbio – Trofeo Dimmidisì

Final
- Champions: (Brazil) Fabrício Neis (Brazil) Fernando Romboli
- Runners-up: (France) Sadio Doumbia (France) Fabien Reboul
- Score: 6–4, 7–6^{(7–4)}

Events
Singles	Doubles
- Internazionali di Tennis di Manerbio – Trofeo Dimmidisì

Romain Arneodo and Hugo Nys were the defending champions but chose not to defend their title.

Fabrício Neis and Fernando Romboli won the title after defeating Sadio Doumbia and Fabien Reboul 6–4, 7–6^{(7–4)} in the final.

== Seeds ==
1. (Italy) Simone Bolelli / (Argentina) Andrés Molteni (semifinals)
2. (Uruguay) Ariel Behar / (Austria) Tristan-Samuel Weissborn (first round)
3. (Brazil) Fabrício Neis / (Brazil) Fernando Romboli (champions)
4. (Bosnia and Herzegovina) Tomislav Brkić / (Croatia) Ante Pavić (quarterfinals)

== Draw ==
Key

- Q = Qualifier
- WC = Wild card
- LL = Lucky loser
- Alt = Alternate
- ITF = ITF entry
- PR = Protected ranking
- SR = Special ranking
- SE = Special exempt
- JE = Junior exempt
- JR = Junior Accelerator Programme entrant
- CO = College Accelerator Programme entrant
- NG = Next Gen Accelerator Program entrant
- w/o = Walkover
- r = Retired
- d = Defaulted

First round
1	(Italy) S Bolelli (Argentina) A Molteni	6	6
(Portugal) F Ferreira Silva (Bosnia and Herzegovina) A Šetkić	4	4
(Uruguay) M Cuevas (Spain) C Gómez-Herrera
(United States) E King (Venezuela) LD Martínez	w/o
3	(Brazil) F Neis (Brazil) F Romboli	7	7
WC	(Argentina) F Cerúndolo (Chile) A Tabilo	5	5
(Italy) A Bega (Italy) J Berrettini	6	5	[11]
(Italy) E Dalla Valle (Russia) P Kotov	4	7	[9]
(Colombia) N Barrientos (Serbia) N Čačić	6	6
WC	(Australia) A Taylor (Australia) J Taylor	4	4
WC	(Italy) Gabriele Bosio (Italy) Samuel Vincent Ruggeri	1	3
4	(Bosnia and Herzegovina) T Brkić (Croatia) A Pavić	6	6
ITF	(France) S Doumbia (France) F Reboul	6^{2}	6	[10]
ITF	(Italy) M Bortolotti (Romania) A Jecan	7^{7}	4	[7]
(Portugal) G Oliveira (Italy) A Pellegrino	6	6
2	(Uruguay) A Behar (Austria) T-S Weissborn	4	4

Quarterfinals
1	(Italy) S Bolelli (Argentina) A Molteni	6	7
(United States) E King (Venezuela) LD Martínez	2	5
3	(Brazil) F Neis (Brazil) F Romboli	6	6
(Italy) A Bega (Italy) J Berrettini	3	1
(Colombia) N Barrientos (Serbia) N Čačić	4	7^{7}	[10]
4	(Bosnia and Herzegovina) T Brkić (Croatia) A Pavić	6	6^{4}	[6]
ITF	(France) S Doumbia (France) F Reboul	6	6
(Portugal) G Oliveira (Italy) A Pellegrino	2	3

Semifinals
1	(Italy) S Bolelli (Argentina) A Molteni	7^{7}	4	[9]
3	(Brazil) F Neis (Brazil) F Romboli	6^{2}	6	[11]
(Colombia) N Barrientos (Serbia) N Čačić	2	6	[8]
ITF	(France) S Doumbia (France) F Reboul	6	4	[10]

Final
3	(Brazil) F Neis (Brazil) F Romboli	6	7^{7}
ITF	(France) S Doumbia (France) F Reboul	4	6^{4}
