= 2024 Curitiba Challenger =

- Date: 21 – 27 October
- Edition: 3rd
- Surface: Clay
- Location: Curitiba, Brazil

Champions

Singles
- (Portugal) Jaime Faria

Doubles
- (Brazil) Fernando Romboli / (Chile) Matías Soto
- Curitiba Challenger

The 2024 Copa Internacional de Tênis was a professional tennis tournament played on clay courts. It was the third edition of the tournament which was part of the 2024 ATP Challenger Tour. It took place in Curitiba, Brazil between 21 and 27 October 2024.

== Singles main-draw entrants ==
=== Seeds ===
Country	Player	Rank^{1}	Seed
~~ARG~~	~~Camilo Ugo Carabelli~~	~~104~~	~~1~~
BOL	Hugo Dellien	105	2
COL	Daniel Elahi Galán	112	3
ARG	Román Andrés Burruchaga	130	4
POR	Jaime Faria	147	5
ARG	Juan Manuel Cerúndolo	151	6
POR	Henrique Rocha	162	7
BRA	Felipe Meligeni Alves	165	8
CHI	Tomás Barrios Vera	170	9

- ^{1} Rankings are as of 14 October 2024.

=== Other entrants ===
The following players received wildcards into the singles main draw:

- (Brazil) Wilson Leite
- (Brazil) José Pereira
- (Brazil) Matheus Pucinelli de Almeida

The following players received entry into the singles main draw as alternates:

- (Brazil) Mateus Alves
- (Portugal) Gastão Elias
- (Chile) Matías Soto

The following players received entry from the qualifying draw:

- (Argentina) Luciano Emanuel Ambrogi
- (Brazil) Orlando Luz
- (Argentina) Lautaro Midón
- (Bolivia) Juan Carlos Prado Ángelo
- (Brazil) João Lucas Reis da Silva
- (Argentina) Gonzalo Villanueva

== Champions ==
=== Singles ===
- (Portugal) Jaime Faria def. (Brazil) Felipe Meligeni Alves 6–4, 6–4.

=== Doubles ===
- (Brazil) Fernando Romboli / (Chile) Matías Soto def. (Poland) Karol Drzewiecki / (Poland) Piotr Matuszewski 7–6^{(7–5)}, 7–6^{(7–4)}.
