= 2026 Curitiba Challenger =

- Date: 28 September – 4 October
- Edition: 5th
- Surface: Clay
- Location: Curitiba, Brazil

Champions

Singles
- (Argentina) Guido Iván Justo

Doubles
- (Argentina) Mariano Kestelboim / (Brazil) Marcelo Zormann
- Curitiba Challenger

The 2026 Campeonato Internacional de Tênis was a professional tennis tournament played on clay courts. It was the fifth edition of the tournament which was part of the 2026 ATP Challenger Tour. It took place in Curitiba, Brazil between 28 September and 4 October 2026.

== Singles main-draw entrants ==
=== Seeds ===
Country	Player	Rank^{1}	Seed
BRA	Gustavo Heide	120	1
CHI	Tomás Barrios Vera	137	2
~~BRA~~	~~Thiago Seyboth Wild~~	~~138~~	~~3~~
BOL	Juan Carlos Prado Ángelo	164	4
ARG	Lautaro Midón	197	5
ARG	Facundo Mena	220	6
BRA	João Lucas Reis da Silva	224	7
ARG	Guido Iván Justo	233	8

- ^{1} Rankings are as of 21 September 2026.

=== Other entrants ===
The following players received wildcards into the singles main draw:

- (Brazil) Lucas Andrade da Silva
- (Brazil) Guto Miguel
- (Brazil) João Eduardo Schiessl

The following player received entry into the singles main draw using a protected ranking:

- (Brazil) Felipe Meligeni Alves

The following player received entry into the singles main draw through the Next Gen Accelerator programme:

- (Colombia) Miguel Tobón

The following players received entry into the singles main draw as alternates:

- (Brazil) Mateus Alves
- (Argentina) Hernán Casanova
- (Bolivia) Murkel Dellien
- (Brazil) Eduardo Ribeiro
- (Argentina) Carlos María Zárate

The following players received entry from the qualifying draw:

- (Colombia) Samuel Heredia
- (Brazil) José Pereira
- (Brazil) Victor Hugo Remondy Pagotto
- (Argentina) Lorenzo Joaquín Rodríguez
- (Brazil) Pedro Sakamoto
- (Brazil) Paulo André Saraiva dos Santos

The following players received entry as lucky losers:

- (United States) ~~Ryan Dickerson~~
- (Brazil) Bruno Fernandez
- (Brazil) Wilson Leite

== Champions ==
=== Singles ===
- (Argentina) Guido Iván Justo def. (Brazil) Gustavo Heide 6–1, 6–4.

=== Doubles ===
- (Argentina) Mariano Kestelboim / (Brazil) Marcelo Zormann def. (Brazil) Guto Miguel / (Brazil) Eduardo Ribeiro 5–7, 7–6^{(7–3)}, [10–7].
