= 2019 Internazionali di Tennis di Manerbio – Trofeo Dimmidisì – Singles =

Trofeo Dimmidisì – Singles
- 2019 Internazionali di Tennis di Manerbio – Trofeo Dimmidisì

Final
- Champion: (Italy) Federico Gaio
- Runner-up: (Italy) Paolo Lorenzi
- Score: 6–3, 6–1

Events
Singles	Doubles
- Internazionali di Tennis di Manerbio – Trofeo Dimmidisì

Roberto Carballés Baena was the defending champion but chose not to defend his title.

Federico Gaio won the title after defeating Paolo Lorenzi 6–3, 6–1 in the final.

== Seeds ==
All seeds receive a bye into the second round.

1. (Italy) Paolo Lorenzi (final)
2. (Italy) Lorenzo Giustino (quarterfinals, retired)
3. (Belgium) Kimmer Coppejans (second round)
4. (Argentina) Federico Coria (semifinals)
5. (Italy) Federico Gaio (champion)
6. (Serbia) Nikola Milojević (withdrew)
7. (Croatia) Viktor Galović (second round)
8. (Italy) Andrea Arnaboldi (quarterfinals)
9. (Egypt) Mohamed Safwat (second round)
10. (Portugal) Gonçalo Oliveira (second round)
11. (Croatia) Nino Serdarušić (third round)
12. (Portugal) Frederico Ferreira Silva (second round)
13. (Russia) Pavel Kotov (third round)
14. (United States) Evan King (third round)
15. (Chile) Alejandro Tabilo (second round)
16. (Argentina) Andrea Collarini (third round)

== Draw ==
Key

- Q = Qualifier
- WC = Wild card
- LL = Lucky loser
- Alt = Alternate
- ITF = ITF entry
- PR = Protected ranking
- SR = Special ranking
- SE = Special exempt
- JE = Junior exempt
- JR = Junior Accelerator Programme entrant
- CO = College Accelerator Programme entrant
- NG = Next Gen Accelerator Program entrant
- w/o = Walkover
- r = Retired
- d = Defaulted

=== Finals ===
Quarterfinals
1	(Italy) Paolo Lorenzi	1	7	6
ITF	(France) Sadio Doumbia	6	5	4
(Russia) Teymuraz Gabashvili	7^{7}	4	6
8	(Italy) Andrea Arnaboldi	6^{2}	6	3
(Hungary) Zsombor Piros	4	4
4	(Argentina) Federico Coria	6	6
5	(Italy) Federico Gaio	4
2	(Italy) Lorenzo Giustino	2^{r}

Semifinals
1	(Italy) Paolo Lorenzi	6	6
(Russia) Teymuraz Gabashvili	4	4
4	(Argentina) Federico Coria	6	4	2
5	(Italy) Federico Gaio	1	6	6

Final
1	(Italy) Paolo Lorenzi	3	1
5	(Italy) Federico Gaio	6	6

=== Top half ===
==== Section 1 ====
First round
(Germany) P Torebko	4	6	6
PR	(Spain) Í Cervantes	6	1	1
WC	(Italy) Samuel Vincent Ruggeri	6	1	4
(Spain) Carlos Boluda-Purkiss	4	6	6
(Italy) A Pellegrino	6	4	7^{9}
(Spain) C Gómez-Herrera	2	6	6^{7}
ITF	(France) S Doumbia	7^{7}	0
(Croatia) A Pavić	6^{0}	0^{r}

Second round
1	(Italy) P Lorenzi	2	6	6
(Germany) P Torebko	6	1	4
(Spain) C Boluda-Purkiss	0	3
16	(Argentina) A Collarini	6	6
10	(Portugal) G Oliveira	1	4
(Italy) A Pellegrino	6	6
ITF	(France) S Doumbia	6	6
7/WC	(Croatia) V Galović	1	2

Third round
1	(Italy) P Lorenzi	6	6
16	(Argentina) A Collarini	4	3
(Italy) A Pellegrino	7	3	4
ITF	(France) S Doumbia	5	6	6

Quarterfinals
1	(Italy) P Lorenzi	1	7	6
ITF	(France) S Doumbia	6	5	4

==== Section 2 ====
First round
(Italy) J Berrettini	0	7^{7}	3
(Russia) T Gabashvili	6	6^{5}	6
(Bosnia and Herzegovina) A Šetkić	4	6^{3}
(Italy) G Zeppieri	6	7^{7}
WC	(Denmark) H Rune	6^{4}	0
ITF	(Argentina) F Cerúndolo	7^{7}	6
(Spain) G Granollers	2	6	6
ITF	(Netherlands) B van de Zandschulp	6	4	4

Second round
3	(Belgium) K Coppejans	7	3	3
(Russia) T Gabashvili	5	6	6
(Italy) G Zeppieri	3	3
14	(United States) E King	6	6
12	(Portugal) F Ferreira Silva	4	6	1
ITF	(Argentina) F Cerúndolo	6	3	6
(Spain) G Granollers	3	3
8	(Italy) A Arnaboldi	6	6

Third round
(Russia) T Gabashvili	6	6
14	(United States) E King	3	4
ITF	(Argentina) F Cerúndolo	2	3
8	(Italy) A Arnaboldi	6	6

Quarterfinals
(Russia) T Gabashvili	7^{7}	4	6
8	(Italy) A Arnaboldi	6^{2}	6	3

=== Bottom half ===
==== Section 3 ====
First round
(Bosnia and Herzegovina) T Brkić	6^{4}	6	2
(Hungary) Z Piros	7^{7}	3	6
(Italy) E Dalla Valle	6^{3}	4
(Chinese Taipei) C-h Tseng	7^{7}	6
WC	(Italy) Gabriele Bosio	3	6^{1}
(Netherlands) S Griekspoor	6	7^{7}
ITF	(Argentina) TM Etcheverry	6	6
(Italy) A Bega	3	2

Second round
LL	(Serbia) N Čačić	6	4	4
(Hungary) Z Piros	2	6	6
(Chinese Taipei) C-h Tseng	6	6
9	(Egypt) M Safwat	1	3
15	(Chile) A Tabilo	3	2
(Netherlands) S Griekspoor	6	6
ITF	(Argentina) TM Etcheverry	6^{4}	6	4
4	(Argentina) F Coria	7^{7}	4	6

Third round
(Hungary) Z Piros	4	6	6
(Chinese Taipei) C-h Tseng	6	2	3
(Netherlands) S Griekspoor	5	1
4	(Argentina) F Coria	7	6

Quarterfinals
(Hungary) Z Piros	4	4
4	(Argentina) F Coria	6	6

==== Section 4 ====
First round
PR	(Colombia) N Barrientos	4	3
Q	(France) F Reboul	6	6
ITF	(Russia) I Gakhov	6	7^{7}
(Italy) L Musetti	3	6^{5}
WC	(Italy) Filippo Speziali	1	6^{4}
(Norway) V Durasovic	6	7^{7}
Q	(Italy) M Bortolotti	6^{4}	1
(Uruguay) M Cuevas	7^{7}	6

Second round
5	(Italy) F Gaio	4	6	7^{7}
Q	(France) F Reboul	6	3	6^{1}
ITF	(Russia) I Gakhov	3	3
11	(Croatia) N Serdarušić	6	6
13	(Russia) P Kotov	0	6	6
(Norway) V Durasovic	6	2	3
(Uruguay) M Cuevas	6^{3}	6	3
2	(Italy) L Giustino	7^{7}	3	6

Third round
5	(Italy) F Gaio	3	6	6
11	(Croatia) N Serdarušić	6	3	4
13	(Russia) P Kotov	6	4	5
2	(Italy) L Giustino	1	6	7

Quarterfinals
5	(Italy) F Gaio	4
2	(Italy) L Giustino	2^{r}
