= 2023 Curitiba Challenger =

- Date: 23 – 29 October
- Edition: 2nd
- Surface: Clay
- Location: Curitiba, Brazil

Champions

Singles
- (Bolivia) Hugo Dellien

Doubles
- (Argentina) Guido Andreozzi / (Uruguay) Ignacio Carou
- Curitiba Challenger

The 2023 Copa Internacional de Tênis was a professional tennis tournament played on clay courts. It was the second edition of the tournament which was part of the 2023 ATP Challenger Tour. It took place in Curitiba, Brazil between 23 and 29 October 2023.

== Singles main-draw entrants ==
=== Seeds ===
Country	Player	Rank^{1}	Seed
ARG	Juan Manuel Cerúndolo	99	1
ARG	Thiago Agustín Tirante	111	2
ARG	Francisco Comesaña	117	3
CZE	Vít Kopřiva	122	4
BOL	Hugo Dellien	129	5
BRA	Felipe Meligeni Alves	142	6
~~ARG~~	~~Mariano Navone~~	~~146~~	~~7~~
ARG	Camilo Ugo Carabelli	148	8
ITA	Luciano Darderi	157	9

- ^{1} Rankings are as of 16 October 2023.

=== Other entrants ===
The following players received wildcards into the singles main draw:

- (Brazil) Gustavo Ribeiro de Almeida
- (Brazil) Wilson Leite
- (Brazil) Orlando Luz

The following player received entry into the singles main draw as an alternate:

- (Spain) Carlos Taberner

The following players received entry from the qualifying draw:

- (Brazil) Mateus Alves
- (Brazil) Pedro Boscardin Dias
- (Brazil) Daniel Dutra da Silva
- (Peru) Arklon Huertas del Pino
- (Brazil) Gilbert Klier Júnior
- (Brazil) Nicolas Zanellato

== Champions ==
=== Singles ===
- (Bolivia) Hugo Dellien def. (United States) Oliver Crawford 7–6^{(8–6)}, 4–6, 7–6^{(7–1)}.

=== Doubles ===
- (Argentina) Guido Andreozzi / (Uruguay) Ignacio Carou def. (Ecuador) Diego Hidalgo / (Colombia) Cristian Rodríguez 6–4, 6–4.
