= 2025 Curitiba Challenger =

- Date: 13 – 19 October
- Edition: 4th
- Surface: Clay
- Location: Curitiba, Brazil

Champions

Singles
- (Paraguay) Daniel Vallejo

Doubles
- (Chile) Matías Soto / (Bolivia) Federico Zeballos
- Curitiba Challenger

The 2025 Copa Internacional de Tênis was a professional tennis tournament played on clay courts. It was the fourth edition of the tournament which was part of the 2025 ATP Challenger Tour. It took place in Curitiba, Brazil between 13 and 19 October 2025.

== Singles main-draw entrants ==
=== Seeds ===
| Country | Player | Rank^{1} | Seed |
|---|---|---|---|
| USA | Emilio Nava | 92 | 1 |
| ARG | Thiago Agustín Tirante | 97 | 2 |
| ~~ESP~~ | ~~Carlos Taberner~~ | ~~104~~ | ~~3~~ |
| BOL | Hugo Dellien | 129 | 4 |
| ARG | Román Andrés Burruchaga | 130 | 5 |
| CHI | Tomás Barrios Vera | 137 | 6 |
| ARG | Juan Pablo Ficovich | 147 | 7 |
| ARG | Alex Barrena | 170 | 8 |
| BRA | Thiago Monteiro | 174 | 9 |

- ^{1} Rankings are as of 29 September 2025.

=== Other entrants ===
The following players received wildcards into the singles main draw:

- (Brazil) Luís Miguel
- (Brazil) Eduardo Ribeiro
- (Brazil) João Eduardo Schiessl

The following players received entry into the singles main draw as alternates:

- (Argentina) Nicolás Kicker
- (Brazil) Matheus Pucinelli de Almeida
- (Spain) Nikolás Sánchez Izquierdo
- (Chile) Matías Soto

The following players received entry from the qualifying draw:

- (Brazil) Mateus Alves
- (Brazil) Pedro Boscardin Dias
- (Brazil) Gustavo Heide
- (Mexico) Alex Hernández
- (Greece) Aristotelis Thanos
- (Colombia) Miguel Tobón

The following player received entry as a lucky loser:

- (Brazil) Daniel Dutra da Silva

== Champions ==
=== Singles ===
- (Paraguay) Daniel Vallejo def. (Brazil) Pedro Boscardin Dias 6–3, 7–5.

=== Doubles ===
- (Chile) Matías Soto / (Bolivia) Federico Zeballos def. (Ecuador) Gonzalo Escobar / (Mexico) Miguel Ángel Reyes-Varela 6–4, 7–5.
