= 2015 Challenger Ciudad de Guayaquil – Doubles =

Doubles
- 2015 Challenger Ciudad de Guayaquil

Final
- Champion: (Argentina) Guillermo Durán (Argentina) Andrés Molteni
- Runner-up: (Portugal) Gastão Elias (Brazil) Fabrício Neis
- Score: 6–3, 6–4

Events
Singles	Doubles
- Challenger Ciudad de Guayaquil

Guillermo Durán and Andrés Molteni won the title, beating Gastão Elias and Fabrício Neis 6–3, 6–4

== Seeds ==
1. (Argentina) Guillermo Durán / (Argentina) Andrés Molteni (champions)
2. (Portugal) Gastão Elias / (Brazil) Fabrício Neis (final)
3. (Spain) Roberto Carballés Baena / (Netherlands) Mark Vervoort (semifinals)
4. (Argentina) Pedro Cachin / (Argentina) Renzo Olivo (first round)

== Draw ==
Key

- Q = Qualifier
- WC = Wild card
- LL = Lucky loser
- Alt = Alternate
- ITF = ITF entry
- PR = Protected ranking
- SR = Special ranking
- SE = Special exempt
- JE = Junior exempt
- JR = Junior Accelerator Programme entrant
- CO = College Accelerator Programme entrant
- NG = Next Gen Accelerator Program entrant
- w/o = Walkover
- r = Retired
- d = Defaulted

=== Draw ===
First round
1	(Argentina) G Durán (Argentina) A Molteni	6	3	[10]
(Argentina) JI Londero (Brazil) P Sakamoto	3	6	[4]
(Austria) M Linzer (Chile) JC Sáez
(Italy) R Bellotti (Austria) D Novak	w/o
3	(Spain) R Carballés Baena (Netherlands) M Vervoort	6	6
WC	(Argentina) F Argüello (Ecuador) AC March	4	2
(France) M Bourgue (France) A Michon	2	2
(Brazil) A Ghem (Brazil) T Monteiro	6	6
(Argentina) N Kicker (Sweden) C Lindell	4	4
(Bosnia and Herzegovina) D Džumhur (Poland) K Majchrzak	6	6
WC	(Argentina) G Andreozzi (Argentina) Valentin Florez	2	6	[10]
4	(Argentina) P Cachin (Argentina) R Olivo	6	3	[8]
(Uruguay) M Cuevas (Bolivia) H Dellien
(Ecuador) I Endara (Ecuador) G Escobar	w/o
WC	(Ecuador) E Gómez (Ecuador) R Quiroz	6^{12}	3
2	(Portugal) G Elias (Brazil) Fabrício Neis	7^{14}	6

Quarterfinals
1	(Argentina) G Durán (Argentina) A Molteni	6	6
(Italy) R Bellotti (Austria) D Novak	1	1
3	(Spain) R Carballés Baena (Netherlands) M Vervoort	w/o
(Brazil) A Ghem (Brazil) T Monteiro
(Bosnia and Herzegovina) D Džumhur (Poland) K Majchrzak	2	1
WC	(Argentina) G Andreozzi (Argentina) V Florez	6	6
(Ecuador) I Endara (Ecuador) G Escobar	1	1
2	(Portugal) G Elias (Brazil) F Neis	6	6

Semifinals
1	(Argentina) G Durán (Argentina) A Molteni	6	4	[10]
3	(Spain) R Carballés Baena (Netherlands) M Vervoort	0	6	[7]
WC	(Argentina) G Andreozzi (Argentina) V Florez	2	4
2	(Portugal) G Elias (Brazil) F Neis	6	6

Final
1	(Argentina) G Durán (Argentina) A Molteni	6	6
2	(Portugal) G Elias (Brazil) F Neis	3	4
