= Taroii Open de Tênis =

Defunct tennis tournament
- Location: Itajaí, Brazil
- Category: ATP Challenger Tour
- Surface: Clay
- Draw: 32S/16Q/16D
- Prize money: $ 40,000 (2014), 35,000+H
- Notes: Website

The Taroii Open de Tênis was a tennis tournament held in Itajaí, Brazil in 2013 and in 2014. The event was part of the ATP Challenger Tour.

== Past finals ==
=== Singles ===
Year	Champion	Runner-up	Score
2014	(Argentina) Facundo Argüello	(Argentina) Diego Sebastián Schwartzman	4–6, 6–0, 6–4
2013	(Brazil) Rogério Dutra da Silva	(Slovakia) Jozef Kovalík	4–6, 6–3, 6–1

=== Doubles ===
Year	Champions	Runners-up	Score
2014	(Argentina) Máximo González (Argentina) Eduardo Schwank	(Brazil) André Sá (Brazil) João Souza	6–2, 6–3
2013	(Australia) James Duckworth (France) Pierre-Hugues Herbert	(Brazil) Guilherme Clezar (Brazil) Fabrício Neis	7–5, 6–2
