= Fabrício Neis =

Brazilian tennis player

- Country (sports): Brazil
- Born: 15 June 1990 (age 36) Porto Alegre, Brazil
- Height: 1.83 m (6 ft 0 in)
- Turned pro: 2005
- Retired: 2020
- Plays: Left-handed (two-handed backhand)
- Prize money: US $150,315

Singles
- Career record: 0–0 (at ATP Tour level, Grand Slam level, and in Davis Cup)
- Career titles: 0; 0 Challenger, 2 Futures
- Highest ranking: No. 449 (13 May 2013)

Doubles
- Career record: 3–8 (at ATP Tour level, Grand Slam level, and in Davis Cup)
- Career titles: 0; 11 Challenger, 35 Futures
- Highest ranking: No. 96 (3 October 2016)

Fabrício Neis (born 15 June 1990, in Porto Alegre) is a Brazilian former tennis player. Neis has a career high ATP singles ranking of No. 449 achieved on 13 May 2013 and a career high ATP doubles ranking of No. 96 achieved on 3 October 2016.

Neis retired from tennis in 2020 and became a beach tennis player. In 2025, he became the ITF Beach Tennis World Championship mixed doubles champion.

== Challenger and Futures finals ==
=== Singles: 5 (2–3) ===
Legend (singles) ATP Challenger Tour (0–0) ITF Futures Tour (2–3)	Titles by surface Hard (0–0) Clay (2–3) Grass (0–0) Carpet (0–0)

Result	W–L	Date	Tournament	Tier	Surface	Opponent	Score
Loss	0–1	Sep 2011	Brazil F29, Arapongas	Futures	Clay	(Argentina) Juan-Manuel Valverde	4–6, 3–6
Loss	0–2	Jun 2012	Brazil F14, Fortaleza	Futures	Clay	(Brazil) Leonardo Kirche	4–6, 7–6^{(7–5)}, 5–7
Win	1–2	Sep 2013	Brazil F8, Caxias do Sul	Futures	Clay	(Brazil) Pedro Sakamoto	6–2, 6–2
Loss	1–3	Oct 2013	Brazil F11, Goiânia	Futures	Clay	(Brazil) Daniel Dutra da Silva	3–6, 4–6
Win	2–3	Nov 2014	Brazil F15, Foz do Iguaçu	Futures	Clay	(Brazil) Rafael Matos	6–3, 7–5

=== Doubles: 78 (46–32) ===
Legend (doubles) ATP Challenger Tour (11–17) ITF Futures Tour (35–15)	Titles by surface Hard (2–2) Clay (44–30) Grass (0–0) Carpet (0–0)

Result	W–L	Date	Tournament	Tier	Surface	Partner	Opponents	Score
Win	1–0	Jun 2009	Brazil F8, Divinópolis	Futures	Clay	(Brazil) Tiago Lopes	(Brazil) Marcelo Demoliner (Brazil) Rodrigo Guidolin	7–6^{(7–3)}, 7–6^{(7–3)}
Win	2–0	Oct 2009	Brazil F21, Itu	Futures	Clay	(Brazil) Rafael Camilo	(Brazil) João Victor Costa (Brazil) Danilo Ferraz	6–3, 6–3
Loss	2–1	Oct 2009	Brazil F24, São Leopoldo	Futures	Clay	(Argentina) Juan-Pablo Amado	(Portugal) Gonçalo Falcão (Brazil) Diego Matos	6–4, 3–6, [7–10]
Win	3–1	Nov 2009	Brazil F26, Porto Alegre	Futures	Clay	(Brazil) Rodrigo Guidolin	(Brazil) Diego Matos (Brazil) Ricardo Siggia	6–4, 6–3
Loss	3–2	Dec 2009	Brazil F30, Foz do Iguaçu	Futures	Clay	(Brazil) Rafael Camilo	(Brazil) Alexandre Bonatto (Brazil) Rodrigo Guidolin	4–6, 1–6
Loss	3–3	Dec 2009	Brazil F31, Araçatuba	Futures	Clay	(Brazil) Rodrigo Guidolin	(Brazil) Diego Matos (Brazil) André Miele	4–6, 4–6
Loss	3–4	Apr 2010	Brazil F1, Santa Maria	Futures	Clay	(Brazil) Rafael Camilo	(Brazil) Gustavo Junqueira de Andrade (Brazil) Thales Turini	2–6, 1–6
Loss	3–5	Jul 2010	Brazil F15, Guarulhos	Futures	Clay	(Brazil) Rafael Camilo	(Brazil) Marcelo Demoliner (Brazil) Rodrigo Guidolin	4–6, 3–6
Win	4–5	Sep 2010	Brazil F22, São José do Rio Preto	Futures	Clay	(Brazil) Rafael Camilo	(Argentina) Juan-Pablo Amado (Brazil) Rodrigo-Antonio Grilli	6–1, 6–3
Loss	4–6	Sep 2010	Brazil F24, Recife	Futures	Clay (i)	(Brazil) Diego Matos	(Argentina) Juan-Pablo Amado (Brazil) Ricardo Siggia	5–7, 6–2, [9–11]
Loss	4–7	Oct 2010	Brazil F27, Salvador	Futures	Hard	(Brazil) Fernando Romboli	(Greece) Theodoros Angelinos (Brazil) Diego Matos	3–6, 6–7^{(5–7)}
Win	5–7	Oct 2010	Brazil F28, Fernandópolis	Futures	Clay	(Sweden) Christian Lindell	(Brazil) Tiago Fernandes (Brazil) Bruno Semenzato	w/o
Loss	5–8	Oct 2010	Brazil F29, São Leopoldo	Futures	Clay	(Brazil) José Pereira	(Brazil) Fernando Romboli (Brazil) Nicolas Santos	4–6, 2–6
Loss	5–9	Jul 2011	Brazil F21, Curitiba	Futures	Clay	(Brazil) Gabriel Vicentini Pereira	(Brazil) Tiago Lopes (Brazil) André Miele	3–6, 7–6^{(8–6)}, [9–11]
Loss	5–10	Sep 2011	Campinas, Brazil	Challenger	Clay	(Brazil) João Pedro Sorgi	(Uruguay) Marcel Felder (Brazil) Caio Zampieri	5–7, 4–6
Win	6–10	Oct 2011	Brazil F34, Fernandópolis	Futures	Clay	(Brazil) Raony Carvalho	(Ecuador) Diego Hidalgo (Brazil) Wilson Leite	6–2, 7–6^{(7–5)}
Win	7–10	Feb 2012	Brazil F7, Lages	Futures	Clay	(Uruguay) Martín Cuevas	(Brazil) Victor Maynard (Brazil) João Pedro Sorgi	6–3, 6–3
Loss	7–11	May 2012	Brazil F9, Goiânia	Futures	Clay	(Brazil) José Pereira	(Brazil) Nicolas Santos (Brazil) Ricardo Siggia	3–6, 6–7^{(6–8)}
Loss	7–12	May 2012	Brazil F10, Manaus	Futures	Clay (i)	(Brazil) José Pereira	(Brazil) Guilherme Clezar (United States) Andrea Collarini	6–7^{(7–9)}, 6–3, [5–10]
Win	8–12	Jun 2012	Brazil F14, Fortaleza	Futures	Clay	(Brazil) André Miele	(Argentina) Maximiliano Estévez (Brazil) Leonardo Kirche	6–3, 6–7^{(3–7)}, [10–7]
Win	9–12	Jul 2012	Brazil F18, Pelotas	Futures	Clay	(Brazil) Thales Turini	(Brazil) Diego Matos (Brazil) José Pereira	6–4, 6–2
Win	10–12	Sep 2012	Brazil F23, Juiz de Fora	Futures	Clay	(Brazil) Fabiano de Paula	(Brazil) Guilherme Clezar (Brazil) Tiago Lopes	6–2, 7–5
Win	11–12	Sep 2012	Brazil F27, Belém	Futures	Hard	(Brazil) Guilherme Clezar	(Brazil) Nicolas Santos (Brazil) João Pedro Sorgi	6–0, 7–6^{(8–6)}
Win	12–12	Nov 2012	Brazil F32, Porto Alegre	Futures	Clay	(Brazil) Thales Turini	(Brazil) André Miele (Brazil) Caio Zampieri	6–4, 7–6^{(7–4)}
Win	13–12	Nov 2012	Brazil F30, Lins	Futures	Clay	(Brazil) Guilherme Clezar	(Brazil) Rodrigo-Antonio Grilli (Brazil) Diego Matos	6–4, 6–7^{(5–7)}, [10–7]
Win	14–12	Nov 2012	Brazil F34, Foz do Iguaçu	Futures	Clay	(Brazil) Nicolas Santos	(Argentina) Patricio Heras (Brazil) Diego Matos	6–4, 6–3
Win	15–12	Dec 2012	Brazil F35, Gramado	Futures	Hard	(Brazil) Nicolas Santos	(Brazil) Marcelo Demoliner (Brazil) Caio Zampieri	5–7, 6–4, [10–4]
Loss	15–13	Dec 2012	Brazil F36, Porto Alegre	Futures	Clay	(Brazil) Nicolas Santos	(Brazil) Augusto Laranja (Brazil) Caio Silva	6–3, 4–6, [10–12]
Loss	15–14	Apr 2013	Itajaí, Brazil	Challenger	Clay	(Brazil) Guilherme Clezar	(Australia) James Duckworth (France) Pierre-Hugues Herbert	5–7, 2–6
Win	16–14	Apr 2013	Chile F2, Santiago	Futures	Clay	(Brazil) Eduardo Dischinger	(Chile) Guillermo Rivera Aránguiz (Chile) Cristóbal Saavedra Corvalán	2–6, 6–2, [10–3]
Loss	16–15	Aug 2013	Brazil F3, Porto Velho	Futures	Hard	(Brazil) Nicolas Santos	(Brazil) José Pereira (Brazil) Alexandre Tsuchiya	6–7^{(5–7)}, 2–6
Win	17–15	Sep 2013	Brazil F8, Caxias do Sul	Futures	Clay	(Brazil) João Pedro Sorgi	(Brazil) João Menezes (Brazil) Evaldo Neto	6–3, 3–6, [10–6]
Win	18–15	Oct 2013	Brazil F11, Goiânia	Futures	Clay	(Brazil) Caio Zampieri	(Brazil) Charles Costa (Brazil) Idio Escobar	6–3, 7–6^{(7–5)}
Win	19–15	Nov 2013	Brazil F14, Porto Alegre	Futures	Clay	(Brazil) Caio Zampieri	(Brazil) Oscar José Gutierrez (Brazil) Osni Junior	6–0, 6–1
Win	20–15	Dec 2013	Brazil F19, Porto Alegre	Futures	Clay	(Brazil) Rafael Camilo	(Brazil) José Pereira (Brazil) Alexandre Tsuchiya	6–4, 7–6^{(7–4)}
Win	21–15	Mar 2014	Peru F1, Lima	Futures	Clay	(Uruguay) Martín Cuevas	(Brazil) Fabiano de Paula (Argentina) Gastón-Arturo Grimolizzi	6–7^{(4–7)}, 6–2, [10–2]
Win	22–15	Jun 2014	Italy F20, Busto Arsizio	Futures	Clay	(Brazil) Pedro Sakamoto	(United States) Sekou Bangoura (Brazil) Daniel Dutra da Silva	4–6, 6–1, [10–8]
Win	23–15	Aug 2014	Brazil F7, São José do Rio Preto	Futures	Clay	(Brazil) Rafael Matos	(Chile) Jorge Aguilar (Chile) Nicolás Jarry	5–7, 6–1, [10–6]
Win	24–15	Sep 2014	Peru F5, Lima	Futures	Clay	(Brazil) Alexandre Tsuchiya	(Brazil) Augusto Laranja (Brazil) Nicolas Santos	1–6, 6–3, [10–5]
Win	25–15	Sep 2014	Peru F6, Lima	Futures	Clay	(Brazil) Alexandre Tsuchiya	(United States) Devin McCarthy (Peru) Rodrigo Sánchez	7–5, 6–4
Loss	25–16	Sep 2014	Campinas, Brazil	Challenger	Clay	(Brazil) André Ghem	(Argentina) Facundo Bagnis (Argentina) Diego Schwartzman	6–7^{(4–7)}, 7–5, [7–10]
Win	26–16	Oct 2014	Chile F4, Santiago	Futures	Clay	(Brazil) José Pereira	(Chile) Cristóbal Saavedra Corvalán (Chile) Ricardo Urzúa Rivera	6–1, 6–1
Win	27–16	Oct 2014	Chile F5, Coquimbo	Futures	Clay	(Brazil) José Pereira	(Chile) Víctor Núñez (Chile) Hans Podlipnik Castillo	5–7, 6–2, [13–11]
Loss	27–17	Nov 2014	Brazil F11, Porto Alegre	Futures	Clay	(Brazil) Wilson Leite	(Brazil) Fernando Romboli (Brazil) Caio Zampieri	6–4, 3–6, [3–10]
Win	28–17	Nov 2014	Brazil F13, Santa Maria	Futures	Clay	(Brazil) Fabiano de Paula	(Brazil) Alex Blumenberg (Brazil) Leonardo Civita-Telles	6–1, 6–4
Win	29–17	Nov 2014	Brazil F15, Foz do Iguaçu	Futures	Clay	(Brazil) Fernando Romboli	(Argentina) Matías Rodolfo Buchhass (Argentina) Tomás Iriarte	7–6^{(7–3)}, 6–3
Win	30–17	Dec 2014	Brazil F16, São José dos Campos	Futures	Clay	(Brazil) Caio Silva	(Brazil) Ricardo Hocevar (Brazil) Tiago Lopes	6–1, 7–5
Loss	30–18	Apr 2015	Chile F3, Santiago	Futures	Clay	(Argentina) Nicolás Kicker	(Chile) Jorge Aguilar (Chile) Hans Podlipnik Castillo	6–7^{(4–7)}, 7–5, [4–10]
Win	31–18	May 2015	Croatia F10, Bol	Futures	Clay	(Brazil) Eduardo Dischinger	(Australia) Maverick Banes (Australia) Gavin van Peperzeel	6–4, 7–5
Win	32–18	May 2015	Croatia F11, Bol	Futures	Clay	(Brazil) Eduardo Dischinger	(Australia) Maverick Banes (Australia) Gavin van Peperzeel	6–2, 7–5
Win	33–18	Jun 2015	Belgium F3, Havré	Futures	Clay	(United States) Deiton Baughman	(Belgium) Sander Gillé (Belgium) Joran Vliegen	2–6, 6–4, [10–2]
Win	34–18	Jul 2015	Netherlands F3, Middelburg	Futures	Clay	(Australia) Maverick Banes	(Netherlands) Niels Lootsma (Netherlands) Boy Westerhof	6–4, 6–4
Win	35–18	Aug 2015	Brazil F5, São José do Rio Preto	Futures	Clay	(Brazil) João Pedro Sorgi	(Brazil) André Miele (Brazil) Alexandre Tsuchiya	3–6, 6–4, [12–10]
Loss	35–19	Sep 2015	Campinas, Brazil	Challenger	Clay	(Brazil) Guilherme Clezar	(Argentina) Andrés Molteni (Chile) Hans Podlipnik Castillo	6–3, 2–6, [0–10]
Loss	35–20	Nov 2015	Guayaquil, Ecuador	Challenger	Clay	(Portugal) Gastão Elias	(Argentina) Guillermo Durán (Argentina) Andrés Molteni	3–6, 4–6
Win	36–20	Apr 2016	São Paulo, Brazil	Challenger	Clay	(Brazil) Caio Zampieri	(Brazil) José Pereira (Brazil) Alexandre Tsuchiya	6–4, 7–6^{(7–3)}
Win	37–20	May 2016	Mestre, Italy	Challenger	Clay	(Brazil) Caio Zampieri	(Germany) Kevin Krawietz (Croatia) Dino Marcan	7–6^{(7–3)}, 4–6, [12–10]
Loss	37–21	May 2016	Vicenza, Italy	Challenger	Clay	(Portugal) Gastão Elias	(Kazakhstan) Andrey Golubev (Croatia) Nikola Mektić	3–6, 3–6
Loss	37–22	Jun 2016	Perugia, Italy	Challenger	Clay	(Colombia) Nicolás Barrientos	(Argentina) Andrés Molteni (Brazil) Rogério Dutra Silva	5–7, 3–6
Win	38–22	Jul 2016	Todi, Italy	Challenger	Clay	(Brazil) Marcelo Demoliner	(Italy) Salvatore Caruso (Italy) Alessandro Giannessi	6–1, 3–6, [10–5]
Loss	38–23	Sep 2016	Curitiba, Brazil	Challenger	Clay	(Brazil) André Ghem	(Spain) Rubén Ramírez Hidalgo (Spain) Pere Riba	7–6^{(7–3)}, 4–6, [7–10]
Loss	38–24	Sep 2016	Santos, Brazil	Challenger	Clay	(Brazil) Rogério Dutra Silva	(Argentina) Máximo González (Peru) Sergio Galdós	3–6, 7–5, [12–14]
Loss	38–25	Jun 2017	Blois, France	Challenger	Clay	(Argentina) Máximo González	(Belgium) Sander Gillé (Belgium) Joran Vliegen	6–3, 3–6, [7–10]
Win	39–25	Jul 2017	Marburg, Germany	Challenger	Clay	(Argentina) Máximo González	(Australia) Rameez Junaid (South Africa) Ruan Roelofse	6–3, 7–6^{(7–4)}
Loss	39–26	Jul 2017	Perugia, Italy	Challenger	Clay	(Argentina) Nicolás Kicker	(Italy) Salvatore Caruso (France) Jonathan Eysseric	3–6, 3–6
Win	40–26	Oct 2017	Campinas, Brazil	Challenger	Clay	(Argentina) Máximo González	(Portugal) Gastão Elias (Brazil) José Pereira	6–1, 6–1
Loss	40–27	Oct 2017	Buenos Aires, Argentina	Challenger	Clay	(Argentina) Máximo González	(Uruguay) Ariel Behar (Brazil) Fabiano de Paula	6–7^{(3–7)}, 7–5, [8–10]
Loss	40–28	Oct 2017	Cali, Colombia	Challenger	Clay	(Peru) Sergio Galdós	(El Salvador) Marcelo Arévalo (Mexico) Miguel Ángel Reyes-Varela	3–6, 4–6
Win	41–28	Nov 2017	Rio de Janeiro, Brazil	Challenger	Clay	(Argentina) Máximo González	(El Salvador) Marcelo Arévalo (Mexico) Miguel Ángel Reyes-Varela	5–7, 6–4, [10–4]
Loss	41–29	Jun 2018	Vicenza, Italy	Challenger	Clay	(Argentina) Facundo Bagnis	(Uruguay) Ariel Behar (Spain) Enrique López Pérez	2–6, 4–6
Win	42–29	Jun 2018	Blois, France	Challenger	Clay	(Spain) David Vega Hernández	(Chinese Taipei) Hsieh Cheng-peng (Australia) Rameez Junaid	7–6^{(7–4)}, 6–1
Win	43–29	Jul 2018	Marburg, Germany	Challenger	Clay	(Spain) David Vega Hernández	(Switzerland) Henri Laaksonen (Switzerland) Luca Margaroli	4–6, 6–4, [10–8]
Win	44–29	Sep 2018	Biella, Italy	Challenger	Clay	(Spain) David Vega Hernández	(Australia) Rameez Junaid (India) Purav Raja	6–4, 6–4
Loss	44–30	Nov 2018	Guayaquil, Ecuador	Challenger	Clay	(Brazil) Thiago Monteiro	(Argentina) Guillermo Durán (Ecuador) Roberto Quiroz	3–6, 2–6
Win	45–30	May 2019	Braga, Portugal	Challenger	Clay	(Spain) Gerard Granollers Pujol	(Belgium) Kimmer Coppejans (Czech Republic) Zdeněk Kolář	6–4, 6–3
Loss	45–31	Jun 2019	Vicenza, Italy	Challenger	Clay	(Brazil) Fernando Romboli	(Portugal) Gonçalo Oliveira (Belarus) Andrei Vasilevski	3–6, 4–6
Win	46–31	Aug 2019	Manerbio, Italy	Challenger	Clay	(Brazil) Fernando Romboli	(France) Sadio Doumbia (France) Fabien Reboul	6–4, 7–6^{(7–4)}
Loss	46–32	Sep 2019	Como, Italy	Challenger	Clay	(Portugal) Pedro Sousa	(Germany) Andre Begemann (Romania) Florin Mergea	7–5, 5–7, [12–14]
