= Curitiba Challenger =

- 2025 Curitiba Challenger

ATP Challenger Tour
- Event name: Copa Internacional de Tênis
- Location: Curitiba, Brazil
- Venue: Graciosa Country Club
- Category: ATP Challenger Tour (2025-), Challenger 100 (2023-2024)
- Surface: Clay
- Draw: 32S/32Q/16D
- Prize money: $100,000 (2025), $133,250 (2024)
- Website: Website

The Copa Internacional de Tênis is a professional tennis tournament played on clay courts. It is currently part of the ATP Challenger Tour. It is held annually in Curitiba, Brazil, since 2016. In 2025 the Curitiba Challenger was elected as the "Challenger 75 Tournament of the Year".

== Past finals ==
=== Singles ===
Year	Champion	Runner-up	Score
2026	(Argentina) Guido Iván Justo	(Brazil) Gustavo Heide	6–1, 6–4
2025	(Paraguay) Daniel Vallejo	(Brazil) Pedro Boscardin Dias	6–3, 7–5
2024	(Portugal) Jaime Faria	(Brazil) Felipe Meligeni Alves	6–4, 6–4
2023	(Bolivia) Hugo Dellien	(United States) Oliver Crawford	7–6^{(8–6)}, 4–6, 7–6^{(7–1)}
2017–22	Not held		
2016	(Argentina) Agustín Velotti	(Brazil) André Ghem	6–0, 6–4

=== Doubles ===
Year	Champions	Runners-up	Score
2026	(Argentina) Mariano Kestelboim (Brazil) Marcelo Zormann	(Brazil) Guto Miguel (Brazil) Eduardo Ribeiro	5–7, 7–6^{(7–3)}, [10–7]
2025	(Chile) Matías Soto (Bolivia) Federico Zeballos	(Ecuador) Gonzalo Escobar (Mexico) Miguel Ángel Reyes-Varela	6–4, 7–5
2024	(Brazil) Fernando Romboli (Chile) Matías Soto	(Poland) Karol Drzewiecki (Poland) Piotr Matuszewski	7–6^{(7–5)}, 7–6^{(7–4)}
2023	(Argentina) Guido Andreozzi (Uruguay) Ignacio Carou	(Ecuador) Diego Hidalgo (Colombia) Cristian Rodríguez	6–4, 6–4
2017–22	Not held		
2016	(Spain) Rubén Ramírez Hidalgo (Spain) Pere Riba	(Brazil) André Ghem (Brazil) Fabrício Neis	6–7^{(3–7)}, 6–4, [10–7]
