= 2012 Tetra Pak Tennis Cup – Singles =

Singles
- 2012 Tetra Pak Tennis Cup

Final
- Champion: (Argentina) Guido Pella
- Runner-up: (Brazil) Leonardo Kirche
- Score: 6–4, 6–0

Events
Singles	Doubles
← 2011 ·	Tetra Pak Tennis Cup	· 2013 →

Máximo González is the defending champion, but lost in the quarterfinals this year.
Guido Pella won the title, defeating Leonardo Kirche 6–4, 6–0 this year.

== Seeds ==
1. (Russia) Alex Bogomolov Jr. (semifinals)
2. (Brazil) Rogério Dutra da Silva (second round)
3. (Brazil) Thiago Alves (semifinals)
4. (Argentina) Guido Pella (champions)
5. (Argentina) Martín Alund (quarterfinals)
6. (Portugal) Gastão Elias (first round)
7. (Brazil) Ricardo Mello (second round)
8. (Brazil) João Souza (quarterfinals)

== Draw ==
=== Key ===
- Q = Qualifier
- WC = Wild card
- LL = Lucky loser
- Alt = Alternate
- SE = Special exempt
- PR = Protected ranking
- ITF = ITF entry
- JE = Junior exempt
- w/o = Walkover
- r = Retired
- d = Defaulted
- SR = Special ranking

=== Finals ===
Semifinals
1	(Russia) Alex Bogomolov Jr.	1	5
4	(Argentina) Guido Pella	6	7
3	(Brazil) Thiago Alves	6^{3}	7^{7}	5
(Brazil) Leonardo Kirche	7^{7}	6^{4}	7

Final
4	(Argentina) Guido Pella	6	6
(Brazil) Leonardo Kirche	4	0

=== Top half ===
First round
1	(Russia) A Bogomolov	6	6
WC	(Brazil) Enrique Bogo	1	3
(Argentina) P Galdón	5	6	6^{2}
Q	(United States) A Collarini	7	3	7^{7}
SE	(Brazil) F de Paula	5	4
(Brazil) M Demoliner	7	6
(Canada) P Bester	2	7^{8}	6^{1}
8	(Brazil) J Souza	6	6^{6}	7^{7}
4	(Argentina) G Pella	6	6
(Argentina) Maximiliano Estévez	3	0
(Ecuador) JC Campozano	6	6
Q	(Brazil) Ricardo Siggia	3	4
(Argentina) A Velotti	6	6
WC	(Brazil) Raúl Francisquiny	0	3
(Argentina) M González	4	6	6
6	(Portugal) G Elias	6	3	4

Second round
1	(Russia) A Bogomolov	6	6
Q	(United States) A Collarini	2	2
(Brazil) M Demoliner	3	3
8	(Brazil) J Souza	6	6
4	(Argentina) G Pella	6	6
(Ecuador) JC Campozano	2	1
(Argentina) A Velotti	5	3
(Argentina) M González	7	6

Quarterfinals
1	(Russia) A Bogomolov	6	3	7
8	(Brazil) J Souza	3	6	5
4	(Argentina) G Pella	7	6
(Argentina) M González	5	3

Semifinals
1	(Russia) A Bogomolov	1	5
4	(Argentina) G Pella	6	7

=== Bottom half ===
First round
5	(Argentina) M Alund	6	6
WC	(Brazil) T Monteiro	4	1
WC	(Brazil) JP Sorgi	6^{3}	2
(Argentina) D Junqueira	7^{7}	6
(Brazil) R Hocevar	6^{5}	2
(Brazil) G Clezar	7^{7}	6
(Argentina) DS Schwartzman	6^{2}	5
3	(Brazil) T Alves	7^{7}	7
7	(Brazil) R Mello	3	6	7^{7}
(Argentina) F Bagnis	6	4	6^{2}
(Brazil) A Ghem	7^{9}	4	6
(Brazil) J Silva	6^{7}	6	4
(Brazil) L Kirche	6	7
Q	(Brazil) Tiago Lopes	4	5
Q	(Argentina) A Molteni	6	3	3
2	(Brazil) R Dutra da Silva	1	6	6

Second round
5	(Argentina) M Alund	6	6
(Argentina) D Junqueira	3	1
(Brazil) G Clezar	4	4
3	(Brazil) T Alves	6	6
7	(Brazil) R Mello	6	3	3
(Brazil) A Ghem	2	6	6
(Brazil) L Kirche	7^{7}	6
2	(Brazil) R Dutra da Silva	6^{5}	2

Quarterfinals
5	(Argentina) M Alund	5	4
3	(Brazil) T Alves	7	6
(Brazil) A Ghem	3	5
(Brazil) L Kirche	6	7

Semifinals
3	(Brazil) T Alves	6^{3}	7^{7}	5
(Brazil) L Kirche	7^{7}	6^{4}	7
