= 2016 Campeonato Internacional de Tênis de Campinas – Singles =

Singles
- 2016 Campeonato Internacional de Tênis de Campinas

Final
- Champion: (Argentina) Facundo Bagnis
- Runner-up: (Argentina) Carlos Berlocq
- Score: 5–7, 6–2, 3–0 ret.

Events
Singles	Doubles
← 2015 ·	Campeonato Internacional de Tênis de Campinas	· 2018 →

Facundo Argüello was the defending champion but chose not to defend his title.

Facundo Bagnis won the title after Carlos Berlocq retired trailing 7–5, 2–6, 0–3 in the final.

== Seeds ==
1. (Argentina) Carlos Berlocq (final, retired)
2. (Brazil) Thiago Monteiro (quarterfinals)
3. (Argentina) Facundo Bagnis (champion)
4. (Argentina) Renzo Olivo (first round)
5. (Brazil) Rogério Dutra Silva (semifinals)
6. (Brazil) João Souza (second round)
7. (Argentina) Guido Andreozzi (quarterfinals)
8. (Argentina) Nicolás Kicker (second round)

== Draw ==
=== Key ===
- Q = Qualifier
- WC = Wild card
- LL = Lucky loser
- Alt = Alternate
- SE = Special exempt
- PR = Protected ranking
- ITF = ITF entry
- JE = Junior exempt
- w/o = Walkover
- r = Retired
- d = Defaulted
- SR = Special ranking

=== Finals ===
Semifinals
1	(Argentina) Carlos Berlocq	6	6
(Portugal) Pedro Sousa	0	4
3	(Argentina) Facundo Bagnis	4	6	7
5	(Brazil) Rogério Dutra Silva	6	1	5

Final
1	(Argentina) Carlos Berlocq	7	2	0^{r}
3	(Argentina) Facundo Bagnis	5	6	3

=== Top half ===
First round
1	(Argentina) C Berlocq	6	6
Q	(Brazil) P Sakamoto	4	1
Q	(Brazil) Carlos Eduardo Severino	2	3
(Argentina) A Velotti	6	6
(Argentina) T Lipovšek Puches	3	6	7
WC	(Brazil) O Luz	6	1	5
(Brazil) J Pereira	4	0^{r}
6	(Brazil) J Souza	6	2
4	(Argentina) R Olivo	6	3	6^{4}
(Argentina) F Coria	2	6	7^{7}
(Argentina) Maximiliano Estévez	4	4
(Argentina) JI Londero	6	6
WC	(Brazil) Fernando Yamacita	5	1
(Portugal) P Sousa	7	6
WC	(Brazil) F Meligeni Alves	3	2
8	(Argentina) N Kicker	6	6

Second round
1	(Argentina) C Berlocq	6	2	6
(Argentina) A Velotti	1	6	4
(Argentina) T Lipovšek Puches	6	4	6
6	(Brazil) J Souza	1	6	3
(Argentina) F Coria	6	2	6^{8}
(Argentina) JI Londero	1	6	7^{10}
(Portugal) P Sousa	6	5	6
8	(Argentina) N Kicker	1	7	4

Quarterfinals
1	(Argentina) C Berlocq	6	6
(Argentina) T Lipovšek Puches	1	0
(Argentina) JI Londero	5	6^{6}
(Portugal) P Sousa	7	7^{8}

Semifinals
1	(Argentina) C Berlocq	6	6
(Portugal) P Sousa	0	4

=== Bottom half ===
First round
7	(Argentina) G Andreozzi	7	6^{3}	6
(Dominican Republic) J Hernández	5	7^{7}	0
(Argentina) M González	2	7^{8}	6
PR	(Brazil) F de Paula	6	6^{6}	0
(Sweden) C Lindell	6	6^{8}	5
Q	(Brazil) JP Sorgi	3	7^{10}	7
WC	(Brazil) M Zormann	0	4
3	(Argentina) F Bagnis	6	6
5	(Brazil) R Dutra Silva	7	6
(Argentina) JP Paz	5	3
(Brazil) D Dutra da Silva	3	6	4
(Brazil) C Zampieri	6	1	6
(Argentina) A Collarini	6	6
Q	(Brazil) B Sant'Anna	3	2
(Brazil) A Ghem	2	1
2	(Brazil) T Monteiro	6	6

Second round
7	(Argentina) G Andreozzi	2	6	6
(Argentina) M González	6	3	2
Q	(Brazil) JP Sorgi	3	4
3	(Argentina) F Bagnis	6	6
5	(Brazil) R Dutra Silva	7	6
(Brazil) C Zampieri	5	3
(Argentina) A Collarini	6^{7}	4
2	(Brazil) T Monteiro	7^{9}	6

Quarterfinals
7	(Argentina) G Andreozzi	6	3	2
3	(Argentina) F Bagnis	2	6	6
5	(Brazil) R Dutra Silva	6	4	6
2	(Brazil) T Monteiro	3	6	1

Semifinals
3	(Argentina) F Bagnis	4	6	7
5	(Brazil) R Dutra Silva	6	1	5
