= 2012 Tetra Pak Tennis Cup – Doubles =

Doubles
- 2012 Tetra Pak Tennis Cup

Final
- Champions: (Brazil) Marcelo Demoliner (Brazil) João Souza
- Runners-up: (Uruguay) Marcel Felder (Argentina) Máximo González
- Score: 6–1, 7–5

Events
Singles	Doubles
← 2011 ·	Tetra Pak Tennis Cup	· 2013 →

Marcel Felder and Caio Zampieri were the defending champions but they decided not to participate together.
Felder played alongside Máximo González, while Zampieri partnered up with Henrique Meloni.
Marcelo Demoliner and João Souza won the title, defeating Marcel Felder and Máximo González 6–1, 7–5 in the final.

== Seeds ==
1. (Brazil) Marcelo Demoliner / (Brazil) João Souza (champions)
2. (Uruguay) Marcel Felder / (Argentina) Máximo González (final)
3. (Argentina) Facundo Bagnis / (Argentina) Guido Pella (semifinals)
4. (Brazil) Ricardo Mello / (Brazil) Júlio Silva (semifinals)

== Draw ==
=== Key ===
- Q = Qualifier
- WC = Wild card
- LL = Lucky loser
- Alt = Alternate
- SE = Special exempt
- PR = Protected ranking
- ITF = ITF entry
- JE = Junior exempt
- w/o = Walkover
- r = Retired
- d = Defaulted
- SR = Special ranking

=== Draw ===
First round
1	(Brazil) M Demoliner (Brazil) J Souza	6	5	[10]
(Brazil) G Clezar (Brazil) A Ghem	3	7	[6]
(Uruguay) A Behar (Argentina) Maximiliano Estévez	4	0
(Portugal) G Elias (Brazil) Rodrigo Grilli	6	6
4	(Brazil) R Mello (Brazil) J Silva	6	6
WC	(Brazil) Henrique Meloni (Brazil) C Zampieri	2	1
(Argentina) P Galdón (Brazil) L Kirche	5	1
(United States) A Collarini (Argentina) A Velotti	7	6
(Brazil) T Alves (Brazil) F de Paula	6	6
WC	(Brazil) Tiago Lopes (Brazil) T Monteiro	3	3
(Brazil) R Hocevar (Brazil) A Miele	4	6	[6]
3	(Argentina) F Bagnis (Argentina) G Pella	6	3	[10]
WC	(Brazil) N Santos (Brazil) JP Sorgi	4	6	[10]
(Argentina) M Alund (Argentina) DS Schwartzman	6	1	[5]
(Argentina) D Junqueira (Argentina) A Molteni	2	3
2	(Uruguay) M Felder (Argentina) M González	6	6

Quarterfinals
1	(Brazil) M Demoliner (Brazil) J Souza	6^{4}	6	[10]
(Portugal) G Elias (Brazil) R Grilli	7^{7}	2	[2]
4	(Brazil) R Mello (Brazil) J Silva	6	6
(United States) A Collarini (Argentina) A Velotti	1	3
(Brazil) T Alves (Brazil) F de Paula	4	3
3	(Argentina) F Bagnis (Argentina) G Pella	6	6
WC	(Brazil) N Santos (Brazil) JP Sorgi	6^{5}	6	[8]
2	(Uruguay) M Felder (Argentina) M González	7^{7}	4	[10]

Semifinals
1	(Brazil) M Demoliner (Brazil) J Souza	7	6^{7}	[10]
4	(Brazil) R Mello (Brazil) J Silva	5	7^{9}	[5]
3	(Argentina) F Bagnis (Argentina) G Pella	3	7^{9}	[7]
2	(Uruguay) M Felder (Argentina) M González	6	7^{7}	[10]

Final
1	(Brazil) M Demoliner (Brazil) J Souza	6	7
2	(Uruguay) M Felder (Argentina) M González	1	5
