= 2013 Tetra Pak Tennis Cup – Singles =

Singles
- 2013 Tetra Pak Tennis Cup

Final
- Champion: (Brazil) Guilherme Clezar
- Runner-up: (Argentina) Facundo Bagnis
- Score: 6–4, 6–4

Events
Singles	Doubles
← 2012 ·	Tetra Pak Tennis Cup	· 2014 →

Guido Pella was the defending champion, but lost to eventual champion Guilherme Clezar in the quarterfinals.
Clezar defeated Facundo Bagnis 6–4, 6–4.

== Seeds ==
1. (Argentina) Guido Pella (quarterfinals)
2. (Argentina) Martín Alund (quarterfinals)
3. (United States) Wayne Odesnik (first round, Retired)
4. (Portugal) Gastão Elias (quarterfinals)
5. (Chile) Paul Capdeville (first round)
6. (Argentina) Guido Andreozzi (first round)
7. (Argentina) Agustín Velotti (second round, retired)
8. (Argentina) Máximo González (semifinals)

== Draw ==
=== Key ===
- Q = Qualifier
- WC = Wild card
- LL = Lucky loser
- Alt = Alternate
- SE = Special exempt
- PR = Protected ranking
- ITF = ITF entry
- JE = Junior exempt
- w/o = Walkover
- r = Retired
- d = Defaulted
- SR = Special ranking

=== Finals ===
Semifinals
(Brazil) Guilherme Clezar	6	6
8	(Argentina) Máximo González	3	4
(United States) Bjorn Fratangelo	1	4
(Argentina) Facundo Bagnis	6	6

Final
(Brazil) Guilherme Clezar	6	6
(Argentina) Facundo Bagnis	4	4

=== Top half ===
First round
1	(Argentina) G Pella	6	6
(Brazil) T Alves	1	2
(Brazil) A Ghem	6	6
(Argentina) P Heras	0	2
(Brazil) R Hocevar	6^{5}	2
Q	(Argentina) G Durán	7^{7}	6
(Brazil) G Clezar	7^{8}	6
6	(Argentina) G Andreozzi	6^{6}	4
4	(Portugal) G Elias	6	6
WC	(Brazil) Ghilherme Scarpelli	1	1
(Argentina) A Collarini	6	3	6
Q	(United States) M Krueger	3	6	4
(Argentina) E Schwank	6	6
(Brazil) L Kirche	4	3
WC	(Brazil) C Zampieri	3	2
8	(Argentina) M González	6	6

Second round
1	(Argentina) G Pella	6	5	6
(Brazil) A Ghem	2	7	2
Q	(Argentina) G Durán	4	3
(Brazil) G Clezar	6	6
4	(Portugal) G Elias	7	4	6
(Argentina) A Collarini	5	6	3
(Argentina) E Schwank	4	2
8	(Argentina) M González	6	6

Quarterfinals
1	(Argentina) G Pella	5	6^{5}
(Brazil) G Clezar	7	7^{7}
4	(Portugal) G Elias	1	3
8	(Argentina) M González	6	6

Semifinals
(Brazil) G Clezar	6	6
8	(Argentina) M González	3	4

=== Bottom half ===
First round
7	(Argentina) A Velotti	7^{7}	6
(Chile) G Lama	6^{7}	3
(United States) B Fratangelo	6	6
(Portugal) P Sousa	4	3
Q	(Peru) S Galdos	2	3
WC	(Brazil) F Romboli	6	6
WC	(Brazil) D Dutra da Silva	2
3	(United States) W Odesnik	2^{r}
5	(Chile) P Capdeville	3	6	2
(Argentina) F Bagnis	6	2	6
(Brazil) T Monteiro	7	6
(Brazil) F de Paula	5	3
(Argentina) A Molteni	6^{2}	4
Q	(Brazil) Tiago Lopes	7^{7}	6
(Dominican Republic) J Hernández	3	3
2	(Argentina) M Alund	6	6

Second round
7	(Argentina) A Velotti	5	2^{r}
(United States) B Fratangelo	7	2
WC	(Brazil) F Romboli	6	6
WC	(Brazil) D Dutra da Silva	4	3
(Argentina) F Bagnis	7	3	6
(Brazil) T Monteiro	5	6	3
Q	(Brazil) T Lopes	4	3
2	(Argentina) M Alund	6	6

Quarterfinals
(United States) B Fratangelo	6	7^{10}
WC	(Brazil) F Romboli	2	6^{8}
(Argentina) F Bagnis	7^{7}	3	7^{7}
2	(Argentina) M Alund	6^{2}	6	6^{4}

Semifinals
(United States) B Fratangelo	1	4
(Argentina) F Bagnis	6	6
