= 2013 Tetra Pak Tennis Cup – Doubles =

Doubles
- 2013 Tetra Pak Tennis Cup

Final
- Champions: (Argentina) Guido Andreozzi (Argentina) Máximo González
- Runners-up: (Brazil) Thiago Alves (Brazil) Thiago Monteiro
- Score: 6–4, 6–4

Events
Singles	Doubles
← 2012 ·	Tetra Pak Tennis Cup	· 2014 →

Marcelo Demoliner and João Souza were the defending champions but they decided not to participate.
Unseeded pairs Guido Andreozzi and Máximo González defeated another unseeded pairing of Thiago Alves and Thiago Monteiro 6–4, 6–4.

== Seeds ==
1. (Argentina) Martín Alund / (Argentina) Facundo Bagnis (quarterfinals)
2. (Argentina) Guillermo Durán / (Argentina) Andrés Molteni (first round)
3. (Moldova) Roman Borvanov / (New Zealand) Artem Sitak (first round)
4. (Brazil) Guilherme Clezar / (Brazil) Andre Ghem (first round)

== Draw ==
=== Key ===
- Q = Qualifier
- WC = Wild card
- LL = Lucky loser
- Alt = Alternate
- SE = Special exempt
- PR = Protected ranking
- ITF = ITF entry
- JE = Junior exempt
- w/o = Walkover
- r = Retired
- d = Defaulted
- SR = Special ranking

=== Draw ===
First round
1	(Argentina) M Alund (Argentina) F Bagnis	w/o
(Brazil) F de Paula (Brazil) F Romboli
(Dominican Republic) J Hernández (Brazil) C Zampieri	2	4
(Brazil) D Dutra da Silva (Argentina) P Heras	6	6
3	(Moldova) R Borvanov (New Zealand) A Sitak	4	5
(Argentina) G Andreozzi (Argentina) M González	6	7
(Chile) Bastian Malla (Brazil) Caio Silva	6	2	[10]
WC	(Brazil) R Mello (Brazil) E Russi	1	6	[4]
(Brazil) T Alves (Brazil) T Monteiro	6	6
(Brazil) Diego Burger Araujo (Brazil) Tiago Lopes	1	3
(Brazil) R Hocevar (Brazil) L Kirche	6	6^{2}	[10]
4	(Brazil) G Clezar (Brazil) A Ghem	3	7^{7}	[7]
(Chile) P Capdeville (United States) W Odesnik
(United States) B Fratangelo (United States) M Krueger	w/o
(Peru) S Galdós (Argentina) G Pella	6	6^{5}	[11]
2	(Argentina) G Durán (Argentina) A Molteni	2	7^{7}	[9]

Quarterfinals
1	(Argentina) M Alund (Argentina) F Bagnis	2	2
(Brazil) D Dutra da Silva (Argentina) P Heras	6	6
(Argentina) G Andreozzi (Argentina) M González	6	6
(Chile) B Malla (Brazil) C Silva	2	0
(Brazil) T Alves (Brazil) T Monteiro	6	6
(Brazil) R Hocevar (Brazil) L Kirche	4	2
(United States) B Fratangelo (United States) M Krueger	4	2
(Peru) S Galdós (Argentina) G Pella	6	6

Semifinals
(Brazil) D Dutra da Silva (Argentina) P Heras	2	4
(Argentina) G Andreozzi (Argentina) M González	6	6
(Brazil) T Alves (Brazil) T Monteiro	7	6
(Peru) S Galdós (Argentina) G Pella	5	1

Final
(Argentina) G Andreozzi (Argentina) M González	6	6
(Brazil) T Alves (Brazil) T Monteiro	4	4
