= 2015 Campeonato Internacional de Tênis de Campinas – Doubles =

Doubles
- 2015 Campeonato Internacional de Tênis de Campinas

Final
- Champions: (Argentina) Andrés Molteni (Chile) Hans Podlipnik
- Runners-up: (Brazil) Guilherme Clezar (Brazil) Fabrício Neis
- Score: 3–6, 6–2, [10–0]

Events
Singles	Doubles
← 2014 ·	Campeonato Internacional de Tênis de Campinas	· 2016 →

Facundo Bagnis and Diego Schwartzman were the defending champions, but chose not to compete together. Bagnis chose to partner with Guido Pella, but lost in the semifinals to Guilherme Clezar and Fabrício Neis. Schwartzman chose not to compete.

== Seeds ==
1. (Argentina) Andrés Molteni / (Chile) Hans Podlipnik (champions)
2. (Argentina) Facundo Bagnis / (Argentina) Guido Pella (semifinals)
3. (Argentina) Guido Andreozzi / (Peru) Sergio Galdós (first round)
4. (Brazil) Guilherme Clezar / (Brazil) Fabrício Neis (final)

== Draw ==
=== Key ===
- Q = Qualifier
- WC = Wild card
- LL = Lucky loser
- Alt = Alternate
- SE = Special exempt
- PR = Protected ranking
- ITF = ITF entry
- JE = Junior exempt
- w/o = Walkover
- r = Retired
- d = Defaulted
- SR = Special ranking

First round
1	(Argentina) A Molteni (Chile) H Podlipnik	6	6
(Sweden) C Lindell (Brazil) J Pereira	4	3
(Argentina) N Kicker (Brazil) C Zampieri	6	5	[13]
(Brazil) O Luz (Brazil) M Zormann	3	7	[15]
3	(Argentina) G Andreozzi (Peru) S Galdós	4	0
(Brazil) Wilson Leite (Brazil) B Sant'Anna	6	6
(Brazil) Tiago Lopes (Brazil) Carlos Eduardo Severino	6	6
WC	(Brazil) Augusto Elias (Brazil) Breno Lodis	1	4
(Portugal) G Elias (Portugal) FF Silva	2	6	[6]
(Bolivia) H Dellien (Brazil) E Dischinger	6	2	[10]
(Brazil) R Dutra Silva (Brazil) A Ghem	2	6	[7]
4	(Brazil) G Clezar (Brazil) F Neis	6	3	[10]
(Argentina) F Argüello (Argentina) JI Londero	3	6	[10]
(Ecuador) G Lapentti (Brazil) F Romboli	6	1	[7]
WC	(Brazil) T Monteiro (Brazil) P Sakamoto	6	1	[4]
2	(Argentina) F Bagnis (Argentina) G Pella	4	6	[10]

Quarterfinals
1	(Argentina) A Molteni (Chile) H Podlipnik	6	7^{7}
(Brazil) O Luz (Brazil) M Zormann	3	6^{4}
(Brazil) W Leite (Brazil) B Sant'Anna	7	6
WC	(Brazil) T Lopes (Brazil) CE Severino	5	4
(Bolivia) H Dellien (Brazil) E Dischinger	6^{3}	2
4	(Brazil) G Clezar (Brazil) F Neis	7^{7}	6
(Argentina) F Argüello (Argentina) JI Londero	3	6	[5]
2	(Argentina) F Bagnis (Argentina) G Pella	6	4	[10]

Semifinals
1	(Argentina) A Molteni (Chile) H Podlipnik	6	6
(Brazil) W Leite (Brazil) B Sant'Anna	4	2
4	(Brazil) G Clezar (Brazil) F Neis	7^{9}	6^{2}	[10]
2	(Argentina) F Bagnis (Argentina) G Pella	6^{7}	7^{7}	[8]

Final
1	(Argentina) A Molteni (Chile) H Podlipnik	3	6	[10]
4	(Brazil) G Clezar (Brazil) F Neis	6	2	[0]
