= 2011 Tetra Pak Tennis Cup =

- Date: 19–25 September
- Edition: 1st
- Location: Campinas, Brazil

Champions

Singles
- (Argentina) Máximo González

Doubles
- (Uruguay) Marcel Felder / (Brazil) Caio Zampieri
Tetra Pak Tennis Cup	· 2012 →

The 2011 Tetra Pak Tennis Cup was a professional tennis tournament played on clay courts. It was the first edition of the Tetra Pak Tennis Cup, which was part of the 2011 ATP Challenger Tour. It took place in Campinas, Brazil between 19 and 25 September 2011.

== ATP entrants ==
=== Seeds ===
Country	Player	Rank^{1}	Seed
ARG	Máximo González	110	1
BRA	Rogério Dutra da Silva	113	3
BRA	Ricardo Mello	120	2
GER	Denis Gremelmayr	162	4
BRA	Júlio Silva	184	5
BRA	Ricardo Hocevar	265	6
POR	Gastão Elias	268	7
ARG	Pablo Galdón	276	8

- ^{1} Rankings are as of September 12, 2011.

=== Other entrants ===
The following players received wildcards into the singles main draw:

- (Brazil) Marcelo Demoliner
- (Brazil) Stefano Soares
- (Brazil) João Pedro Sorgi
- (Brazil) Francisco Zambon

The following players received entry from the qualifying draw:

- (Uruguay) Martín Cuevas
- (Brazil) Fabiano de Paula
- (Argentina) Joaquín-Jesús Monteferrario
- (France) Laurent Recouderc

== Champions ==
=== Singles ===
(Argentina) Máximo González def. (Brazil) Caio Zampieri, 6–3, 6–2

=== Doubles ===
(Uruguay) Marcel Felder / (Brazil) Caio Zampieri def. (Brazil) Fabricio Neis / (Brazil) João Pedro Sorgi, 7–5, 6–4
