= 2012 Tetra Pak Tennis Cup =

- Date: 17–23 September
- Edition: 2nd
- Surface: Clay
- Location: Campinas, Brazil

Champions

Singles
- (Argentina) Guido Pella

Doubles
- (Brazil) Marcelo Demoliner / (Brazil) João Souza
← 2011 ·	Tetra Pak Tennis Cup	· 2013 →

The 2012 Tetra Pak Tennis Cup was a professional tennis tournament played on clay courts. It was the second edition of the tournament which was part of the 2012 ATP Challenger Tour. It took place in Campinas, Brazil from the 17th to the 23rd of September 2012.

== Singles main draw entrants ==
=== Seeds ===
Country	Player	Rank^{1}	Seed
RUS	Alex Bogomolov Jr.	90	1
BRA	Rogério Dutra da Silva	115	2
BRA	Thiago Alves	140	3
ARG	Guido Pella	148	4
ARG	Martín Alund	149	5
POR	Gastão Elias	154	6
BRA	Ricardo Mello	157	7
BRA	João Souza	171	8

- ^{1} Rankings are as of September 10, 2012.

=== Other entrants ===
The following players received wildcards into the singles main draw:

- (Brazil) Enrique Bogo
- (Brazil) Raúl Francisquiny
- (Brazil) Thiago Monteiro
- (Brazil) João Pedro Sorgi

The following players received entry as a special exempt into the singles main draw:

- (Brazil) Fabiano de Paula

The following players received entry from the qualifying draw:

- (United States) Andrea Collarini
- (Brazil) Tiago Lopes
- (Argentina) Andrés Molteni
- (Brazil) Ricardo Siggia

== Champions ==
=== Singles ===
- (Argentina) Guido Pella def. (Brazil) Leonardo Kirche, 6–4, 6–0

=== Doubles ===
- (Brazil) Marcelo Demoliner / (Brazil) João Souza def. (Uruguay) Marcel Felder / (Argentina) Máximo González, 6–1, 7–5
