= 2014 Campeonato Internacional de Tênis de Campinas – Singles =

Singles
- 2014 Campeonato Internacional de Tênis de Campinas

Final
- Champion: (Argentina) Diego Schwartzman
- Runner-up: (Brazil) André Ghem
- Score: 4–6, 6–4, 7–5

Events
Singles	Doubles
← 2013 ·	Campeonato Internacional de Tênis de Campinas	· 2015 →

Guilherme Clezar was the current champion, and returned to defend his title, but lost in quarterfinals to Diego Schwartzman.

Diego Schwartzman won the title by defeating André Ghem 4–6, 6–4, 7–5 in the final.

== Seeds ==
1. (Argentina) Diego Sebastián Schwartzman (champion)
2. (Argentina) Facundo Bagnis (first round)
3. (Argentina) Facundo Argüello (second round)
4. (Portugal) Gastão Elias (first round)
5. (Argentina) Guido Andreozzi (semifinals)
6. (France) Axel Michon (first round)
7. (Brazil) Guilherme Clezar (quarterfinals)
8. (Brazil) André Ghem (final)

== Draw ==
=== Key ===
- Q = Qualifier
- WC = Wild card
- LL = Lucky loser
- Alt = Alternate
- SE = Special exempt
- PR = Protected ranking
- ITF = ITF entry
- JE = Junior exempt
- w/o = Walkover
- r = Retired
- d = Defaulted
- SR = Special ranking

=== Finals ===
Semifinals
1	(Argentina) Diego Sebastián Schwartzman	5	6	7^{7}
5	(Argentina) Guido Andreozzi	7	4	6^{5}
8	(Brazil) André Ghem	6	7
(France) Gianni Mina	2	5

Final
1	(Argentina) Diego Sebastián Schwartzman	4	6	7
8	(Brazil) André Ghem	6	4	5

=== Top half ===
First round
1	(Argentina) D S Schwartzman	6	6
(Argentina) R Olivo	2	4
(Slovakia) Adrian Sikora	7^{7}	7^{7}
(Brazil) F Romboli	6^{5}	6^{2}
WC	(Brazil) M Zormann	4	5
Q	(Brazil) N Santos	6	7
(Chile) G Lama	4	1
7	(Brazil) G Clezar	6	6
3	(Argentina) F Argüello	6	6
Q	(Brazil) JP Sorgi	4	3
(Brazil) J Pereira	6	2
(Brazil) B Sant'anna	1	0^{r}
(Argentina) M Alund	6	3	4
(Argentina) A Collarini	2	6	6
WC	(Brazil) Leonardo Telles	4	3
5	(Argentina) G Andreozzi	6	6

Second round
1	(Argentina) D S Schwartzman	6	6
(Slovakia) A Sikora	1	2
Q	(Brazil) N Santos	1	0
7	(Brazil) G Clezar	6	6
3	(Argentina) F Argüello	5	3
(Brazil) J Pereira	7	6
(Argentina) A Collarini	2	3
5	(Argentina) G Andreozzi	6	6

Quarterfinals
1	(Argentina) D S Schwartzman	6	7^{7}
7	(Brazil) G Clezar	3	6^{4}
(Brazil) J Pereira	3	4
5	(Argentina) G Andreozzi	6	6

Semifinals
1	(Argentina) D S Schwartzman	5	6	7^{7}
5	(Argentina) G Andreozzi	7	4	6^{5}

=== Bottom half ===
First round
8	(Brazil) A Ghem	6	6
(Brazil) T Turini	4	4
(Brazil) F de Paula	4	6	4
WC	(Brazil) F Neis	6	4	6
(Italy) F Gaio	6	6
WC	(Brazil) Ghilherme Scarpelli	0	2
(Slovakia) I Klec	6	7
4	(Portugal) G Elias	4	5
6	(France) A Michon	1	1^{r}
(France) G Mina	6	4
LL	(Brazil) Caio Silva	6	3	6
(Sweden) C Lindell	1	6	4
Q	(Brazil) R Hocevar	4	4
Q	(Brazil) C Zampieri	6	6
(Germany) R Becker	2	6	7
2	(Argentina) F Bagnis	6	3	5

Second round
8	(Brazil) A Ghem	7^{7}	3	6
(Brazil) F Neis	6^{4}	6	4
(Italy) F Gaio	3	0
(Slovakia) I Klec	6	6
(France) G Mina	4
LL	(Brazil) C Silva	2^{r}
Q	(Brazil) C Zampieri	3	3
(Germany) R Becker	6	6

Quarterfinals
8	(Brazil) A Ghem	7^{7}	6
(Slovakia) I Klec	6^{4}	3
(France) G Mina	7^{7}	5	6
(Germany) R Becker	6^{2}	7	3

Semifinals
8	(Brazil) A Ghem	6	7
(France) G Mina	2	5
