= 2011 Tetra Pak Tennis Cup – Doubles =

Doubles
- 2011 Tetra Pak Tennis Cup

Final
- Champions: (Uruguay) Marcel Felder (Brazil) Caio Zampieri
- Runners-up: (Brazil) Fabricio Neis (Brazil) João Pedro Sorgi
- Score: 7–5, 6–4

Events
Singles	Doubles
← 2010 ·	Tetra Pak Tennis Cup	· 2012 →

Marcel Felder and Caio Zampieri won the title, defeating Fabricio Neis and João Pedro Sorgi 7–5, 6–4 in the final.

== Seeds ==
1. (Brazil) Rogério Dutra da Silva / (Brazil) Júlio Silva (quarterfinals, withdrew)
2. (Brazil) André Ghem / (Brazil) Rodrigo Grilli (first round)
3. (Argentina) Martín Alund / (Argentina) Guillermo Durán (quarterfinals)
4. (Uruguay) Marcel Felder / (Brazil) Caio Zampieri (champions)

== Draw ==
=== Key ===
- Q = Qualifier
- WC = Wild card
- LL = Lucky loser
- Alt = Alternate
- SE = Special exempt
- PR = Protected ranking
- ITF = ITF entry
- JE = Junior exempt
- w/o = Walkover
- r = Retired
- d = Defaulted
- SR = Special ranking

=== Draw ===
First round
1	(Brazil) R Dutra da Silva (Brazil) J Silva	6	7^{7}
(Monaco) B Balleret (France) L Recouderc	4	6^{1}
(Portugal) Pedro Palha (Portugal) P Sousa	2	5
(Brazil) Rafael Camilo (Brazil) A Miele	6	7
4	(Uruguay) M Felder (Brazil) C Zampieri	6	6
(Argentina) G Andreozzi (Uruguay) M Cuevas	1	3
(Brazil) Raúl Francisquiny (Brazil) Stefano Soares	1	5
(Brazil) G Clézar (Sweden) C Lindell	6	7
(Brazil) M Demoliner (Argentina) Nicolás Pastor	6	6
WC	(Brazil) F de Paula (Brazil) Gabriel Vicentini Pereira	3	4
WC	(Brazil) Gustavo Miele D'Ascenzi (Brazil) Francisco Zambon	1	2
3	(Argentina) M Alund (Argentina) G Durán	6	6
(Brazil) T Fernandes (Brazil) R Hocevar	6	4	[10]
WC	(Brazil) Oliver Dedding (Brazil) Osni Nery Júnior	1	6	[4]
(Brazil) F Neis (Brazil) JP Sorgi	4	6	[10]
2	(Brazil) A Ghem (Brazil) R Grilli	6	4	[8]

Quarterfinals
1	(Brazil) R Dutra da Silva (Brazil) J Silva
(Brazil) R Camilo (Brazil) A Miele	w/o
4	(Uruguay) M Felder (Brazil) C Zampieri	7^{7}	7
(Brazil) G Clézar (Sweden) C Lindell	6^{5}	5
(Brazil) M Demoliner (Argentina) N Pastor	6	4	[10]
3	(Argentina) M Alund (Argentina) G Durán	3	6	[5]
(Brazil) T Fernandes (Brazil) R Hocevar	4	4
(Brazil) F Neis (Brazil) JP Sorgi	6	6

Semifinals
(Brazil) R Camilo (Brazil) A Miele	6^{3}	4
4	(Uruguay) M Felder (Brazil) C Zampieri	7^{7}	6
(Brazil) M Demoliner (Argentina) N Pastor	1	1
(Brazil) F Neis (Brazil) JP Sorgi	6	6

Final
4	(Uruguay) M Felder (Brazil) C Zampieri	7	6
(Brazil) F Neis (Brazil) JP Sorgi	5	4
