= 2016 Campeonato Internacional de Tênis de Campinas – Doubles =

Doubles
- 2016 Campeonato Internacional de Tênis de Campinas

Final
- Champions: (Argentina) Federico Coria; (Argentina) Tomás Lipovšek Puches
- Runners-up: (Peru) Sergio Galdós; (Argentina) Máximo González
- Score: 7–5, 6–2

Events
| Singles | Doubles |
| ← 2015 · | Campeonato Internacional de Tênis de Campinas | · 2018 → |

Andrés Molteni and Hans Podlipnik were the defending champions but chose not to defend their title.

Federico Coria and Tomás Lipovšek Puches won the title after defeating Sergio Galdós and Máximo González 7–5, 6–2 in the final.

== Seeds ==
1. (Peru) Sergio Galdós / (Argentina) Máximo González (final)
2. (Brazil) Fernando Romboli / (Brazil) Caio Zampieri (semifinals)
3. (Uruguay) Marcel Felder / (Brazil) Fabrício Neis (semifinals)
4. (Argentina) Nicolás Kicker / (Brazil) José Pereira (withdrew)

== Draw ==
=== Key ===
- Q = Qualifier
- WC = Wild card
- LL = Lucky loser
- Alt = Alternate
- SE = Special exempt
- PR = Protected ranking
- ITF = ITF entry
- JE = Junior exempt
- w/o = Walkover
- r = Retired
- d = Defaulted
- SR = Special ranking

First round

Quarterfinals

Semifinals

Final

1
- (Peru) S Galdós
- (Argentina) M González
4
6
[10]

- (Brazil) E Dischinger
- (Brazil) A Ghem
6
3
[5]

1
- (Peru) S Galdós
- (Argentina) M González
6
6

(Sweden) C Lindell
(Brazil) Carlos Eduardo Severino
2
2

- (Argentina) A Collarini
- (Argentina) A Velotti
1
4

- (Argentina) A Collarini
- (Argentina) A Velotti
6
6

1
- (Peru) S Galdós
- (Argentina) M González
6
3
[10]

3
- (Uruguay) M Felder
- (Brazil) F Neis
6
6

3
- (Uruguay) M Felder
- (Brazil) F Neis
4
6
[7]

- (Brazil) P Bernardi
- (Argentina) JP Paz
4
4

3
- (Uruguay) M Felder
- (Brazil) F Neis
7
6

WC
(Brazil) Marcelo Tebet Filho
(Brazil) Fernando Yamacita
2
6
[5]

- (Argentina) M Estévez
- (Dominican Republic) J Hernández
5
4

- (Argentina) Maximiliano Estévez
- (Dominican Republic) J Hernández
6
3
[10]

1
- (Peru) S Galdós
- (Argentina) M González
5
2

WC
- (Brazil) I Marcondes
- (Brazil) F Meligeni Alves
4
3

- (Argentina) F Coria
- (Argentina) T Lipovšek Puches
7
6

- (Argentina) F Coria
- (Argentina) T Lipovšek Puches
6
6

- (Argentina) F Coria
- (Argentina) T Lipovšek Puches
6
6

WC
- (Brazil) O Luz
- (Brazil) M Zormann
w/o

WC
- (Brazil) O Luz
- (Brazil) M Zormann
4
4

4
- (Argentina) N Kicker
- (Brazil) J Pereira

- (Argentina) F Coria
- (Argentina) T Lipovšek Puches
4
6
[10]

- (Brazil) F de Paula
- (Portugal) P Sousa
6
6

2
- (Brazil) F Romboli
- (Brazil) C Zampieri
6
3
[7]

- (Argentina) JI Londero
- (Brazil) P Sakamoto
3
4

- (Brazil) F de Paula
- (Portugal) P Sousa
4
1

(Brazil) D Dutra da Silva
(Brazil) E Russi Assumpção
1
2

2
- (Brazil) F Romboli
- (Brazil) C Zampieri
6
6

2
- (Brazil) F Romboli
- (Brazil) C Zampieri
6
6
