= 2011 Tetra Pak Tennis Cup – Singles =

Singles
- 2011 Tetra Pak Tennis Cup

Final
- Champion: (Argentina) Máximo González
- Runner-up: (Brazil) Caio Zampieri
- Score: 6–3, 6–2

Events
Singles	Doubles
- Tetra Pak Tennis Cup

1st seed Máximo González won the first edition of this tournament, defeating Caio Zampieri 6–3, 6–2 in the final.

== Seeds ==
1. (Argentina) Máximo González (champion)
2. (Brazil) Rogério Dutra da Silva (semifinals)
3. (Brazil) Ricardo Mello (first round)
4. (Germany) Denis Gremelmayr (quarterfinals)
5. (Brazil) Júlio Silva (semifinals)
6. (Brazil) Ricardo Hocevar (first round)
7. (Portugal) Gastão Elias (quarterfinals)
8. (Argentina) Pablo Galdón (first round)

== Draw ==
Key

- Q = Qualifier
- WC = Wild card
- LL = Lucky loser
- Alt = Alternate
- ITF = ITF entry
- PR = Protected ranking
- SR = Special ranking
- SE = Special exempt
- JE = Junior exempt
- JR = Junior Accelerator Programme entrant
- CO = College Accelerator Programme entrant
- NG = Next Gen Accelerator Program entrant
- w/o = Walkover
- r = Retired
- d = Defaulted

=== Finals ===
Semifinals
1	(Argentina) Máximo González	5	6	7
5	(Brazil) Júlio Silva	7	0	5
(Brazil) Caio Zampieri	1	6	7^{7}
2	(Brazil) Rogério Dutra da Silva	6	4	6^{5}

Final
1	(Argentina) Máximo González	6	6
(Brazil) Caio Zampieri	3	2

=== Top half ===
First round
1	(Argentina) M González	6	6
(Brazil) Eládio Ribeiro Neto	2	4
Q	(France) L Recouderc	6	6^{2}	6
WC	(Brazil) JP Sorgi	2	7^{7}	3
(Argentina) Nicolás Pastor	6	3	3
(Brazil) G Clézar	2	6	6
WC	(Brazil) M Demoliner	7^{7}	6^{6}	3
7	(Portugal) G Elias	6^{1}	7^{8}	6
3	(Brazil) R Mello	2	2
(Portugal) P Sousa	6	6
Q	(Brazil) F de Paula	5	6^{4}
(Uruguay) M Felder	7	7^{7}
(Sweden) C Lindell	4	6	7^{7}
(Monaco) B Balleret	6	1	6^{3}
(Germany) P Gojowczyk	0	2
5	(Brazil) J Silva	6	6

Second round
1	(Argentina) M González	4	7^{7}	6
Q	(France) L Recouderc	6	6^{5}	4
(Brazil) G Clézar	6	1	0
7	(Portugal) G Elias	3	6	6
(Portugal) P Sousa	6	3	4
(Uruguay) M Felder	3	6	6
(Sweden) C Lindell	6^{9}	7^{7}	4
5	(Brazil) J Silva	7^{11}	6^{4}	6

Quarterfinals
1	(Argentina) M González	6	6
7	(Portugal) G Elias	3	1
(Uruguay) M Felder	6^{5}	6	3
5	(Brazil) J Silva	7^{7}	3	6

Semifinals
1	(Argentina) M González	5	6	7
5	(Brazil) J Silva	7	0	5

=== Bottom half ===
First round
6	(Brazil) R Hocevar	2	6	6^{3}
(Brazil) A Miele	6	3	7^{7}
(Brazil) C Zampieri	6	3	6
(Brazil) T Fernandes	4	6	2
(Argentina) G Durán	6^{1}	3
(Argentina) G Andreozzi	7^{7}	6
WC	(Brazil) Stefano Soares	0	3
4	(Germany) D Gremelmayr	6	6
8	(Argentina) P Galdón	4	2
(Argentina) M Alund	6	6
(Brazil) A Ghem	7^{7}	6
Q	(Uruguay) M Cuevas	6^{5}	3
(Brazil) Rafael Camilo	6	6
WC	(Brazil) Francisco Zambon	0	1
Q	(Argentina) Joaquín-Jesús Monteferrario	5	3
2	(Brazil) R Dutra da Silva	7	6

Second round
(Brazil) A Miele	7	2	5
(Brazil) C Zampieri	5	6	7
(Argentina) G Andreozzi	3	3
4	(Germany) D Gremelmayr	6	6
(Argentina) M Alund	6	4	3
(Brazil) A Ghem	3	6	6
(Brazil) R Camilo	4	5
2	(Brazil) R Dutra da Silva	6	7

Quarterfinals
(Brazil) C Zampieri	6	6
4	(Germany) D Gremelmayr	1	4
(Brazil) A Ghem	3	4
2	(Brazil) R Dutra da Silva	6	6

Semifinals
(Brazil) C Zampieri	1	6	7^{7}
2	(Brazil) R Dutra da Silva	6	4	6^{5}
