= 2014 Campeonato Internacional de Tênis de Campinas – Doubles =

2014 tennis tournament results

Doubles
- 2014 Campeonato Internacional de Tênis de Campinas

Final
- Champion: (Argentina) Facundo Bagnis (Argentina) Diego Schwartzman
- Runner-up: (Brazil) André Ghem (Brazil) Fabricio Neis
- Score: 7–6^{(7–4)}, 5–7, [10–7]

Events
Singles	Doubles
← 2013 ·	Campeonato Internacional de Tênis de Campinas	· 2015 →

Guido Andreozzi and Máximo González were the defending champions, but they chose not to compete together. Andreozzi chose to partner with Guillermo Durán, but lost in the quarterfinals to Rafael Matos and Marcelo Zormann. González chose not to compete.

Facundo Bagnis and Diego Schwartzman won the title by defeating André Ghem and Fabricio Neis 7–6^{(7–4)}, 5–7, [10–7] in the final.

== Seeds ==
1. (Argentina) Facundo Bagnis / (Argentina) Diego Sebastián Schwartzman (champions)
2. (Argentina) Guido Andreozzi / (Argentina) Guillermo Durán (quarterfinals)
3. (Argentina) Martín Alund / (Argentina) Facundo Argüello (first round)
4. (Brazil) Guilherme Clezar / (Brazil) Fabiano de Paula (quarterfinals)

== Draw ==
=== Key ===
- Q = Qualifier
- WC = Wild card
- LL = Lucky loser
- Alt = Alternate
- SE = Special exempt
- PR = Protected ranking
- ITF = ITF entry
- JE = Junior exempt
- w/o = Walkover
- r = Retired
- d = Defaulted
- SR = Special ranking

=== Draw ===
First round
1	(Argentina) F Bagnis (Argentina) D Schwartzman	6	6
(Slovakia) I Klec (Slovakia) Adrian Sikora	1	2
(Brazil) F Romboli (Brazil) T Turini	6	4	[10]
(Germany) R Becker (Italy) F Gaio	3	6	[5]
3	(Argentina) M Alund (Argentina) F Argüello	7^{7}	6^{3}	[7]
(Argentina) A Collarini (Chile) G Lama	6^{3}	7^{7}	[10]
WC	(Brazil) Henrique Mello (Brazil) Ghilherme Scarpelli	w/o
(France) A Michon (Argentina) R Olivo
(Brazil) A Ghem (Brazil) F Neis	6	7^{8}
(France) G Mina (Brazil) J Pereira	4	6^{6}
WC	(Brazil) Osni Junior (Brazil) Leonardo Telles	6	6^{1}	[4]
4	(Brazil) G Clezar (Brazil) F de Paula	3	7^{7}	[10]
(Brazil) R Hocevar (Sweden) C Lindell	0	2
WC	(Brazil) R Matos (Brazil) M Zormann	6	6
(Brazil) DD da Silva (Brazil) C Zampieri	2	3
2	(Argentina) G Andreozzi (Argentina) G Durán	6	6

Quarterfinals
1	(Argentina) F Bagnis (Argentina) D Schwartzman	6	6
(Brazil) F Romboli (Brazil) T Turini	2	3
(Argentina) A Collarini (Chile) G Lama	6	6
WC	(Brazil) H Mello (Brazil) G Scarpelli	3	2
(Brazil) A Ghem (Brazil) F Neis	6	6
4	(Brazil) G Clezar (Brazil) F de Paula	1	3
WC	(Brazil) R Matos (Brazil) M Zormann	6	6
2	(Argentina) G Andreozzi (Argentina) G Durán	1	3

Semifinals
1	(Argentina) F Bagnis (Argentina) D Schwartzman	6	7
(Argentina) A Collarini (Chile) G Lama	2	5
(Brazil) A Ghem (Brazil) F Neis	6	6
WC	(Brazil) R Matos (Brazil) M Zormann	3	1

Final
1	(Argentina) F Bagnis (Argentina) D Schwartzman	7^{7}	5	[10]
(Brazil) A Ghem (Brazil) F Neis	6^{4}	7	[7]
