= 2014 Campeonato Internacional de Tênis de Campinas =

- Date: 15–21 September
- Edition: 4th
- Surface: Clay
- Location: Campinas, Brazil

Champions

Singles
- (Argentina) Diego Schwartzman

Doubles
- (Argentina) Facundo Bagnis / (Argentina) Diego Schwartzman
← 2013 ·	Campeonato Internacional de Tênis de Campinas	· 2015 →

The 2014 Campeonato Internacional de Tênis de Campinas was a professional tennis tournament played on clay courts. It was the fourth edition of the tournament which was part of the 2014 ATP Challenger Tour. It took place in Campinas, Brazil between 15 and 21 September 2014.

== Singles main-draw entrants ==
=== Seeds ===
Country	Player	Rank^{1}	Seed
ARG	Diego Sebastián Schwartzman	85	1
ARG	Facundo Bagnis	98	2
ARG	Facundo Argüello	116	3
POR	Gastão Elias	139	4
ARG	Guido Andreozzi	166	5
FRA	Axel Michon	179	6
BRA	Guilherme Clezar	189	7
BRA	André Ghem	194	8

- ^{1} Rankings are as of September 8, 2014.

=== Other entrants ===
The following players received wildcards into the singles main draw:

- (Brazil) Fabrício Neis
- (Brazil) Ghilherme Scarpelli
- (Brazil) Leonardo Telles
- (Brazil) Marcelo Zormann

The following players received entry from the qualifying draw:

- (Brazil) Nicolas Santos
- (Brazil) João Pedro Sorgi
- (Brazil) Ricardo Hocevar
- (Brazil) Caio Zampieri

== Champions ==
=== Singles ===
- (Argentina) Diego Schwartzman def. (Brazil) André Ghem, 4–6, 6–4, 7–5

=== Doubles ===
- (Argentina) Facundo Bagnis / (Argentina) Diego Schwartzman def. (Brazil) André Ghem / (Brazil) Fabrício Neis, 7–6^{(7–4)}, 5–7, [10–7]
