= 2015 Campeonato Internacional de Tênis de Campinas – Singles =

Singles
- 2015 Campeonato Internacional de Tênis de Campinas

Final
- Champion: (Argentina) Facundo Argüello
- Runner-up: (Argentina) Diego Schwartzman
- Score: 7–5, 6–3

Events
Singles	Doubles
← 2014 ·	Campeonato Internacional de Tênis de Campinas	· 2016 →

Diego Schwartzman was the defending champion, but lost in the final to Facundo Argüello, 7–5, 6–3.

== Seeds ==
1. (Argentina) Diego Schwartzman (final)
2. (Argentina) Guido Pella (quarterfinals)
3. (Brazil) João Souza (second round)
4. (Brazil) André Ghem (semifinals)
5. (Argentina) Facundo Argüello (champion)
6. (Argentina) Facundo Bagnis (semifinals)
7. (Chile) Hans Podlipnik Castillo (first round)
8. (Brazil) Rogério Dutra Silva (second round)

== Draw ==
=== Key ===
- Q = Qualifier
- WC = Wild card
- LL = Lucky loser
- Alt = Alternate
- SE = Special exempt
- PR = Protected ranking
- ITF = ITF entry
- JE = Junior exempt
- w/o = Walkover
- r = Retired
- d = Defaulted
- SR = Special ranking

=== Finals ===
Semifinals
1	(Argentina) Diego Schwartzman	6	7^{13}
6/Alt	(Argentina) Facundo Bagnis	3	6^{11}
4	(Brazil) André Ghem	6^{5}	3
5	(Argentina) Facundo Argüello	7^{7}	6

Final
1	(Argentina) Diego Schwartzman	5	3
5	(Argentina) Facundo Argüello	7	6

=== Top half ===
First round
1	(Argentina) D Schwartzman	6	7
(Brazil) J Pereira	2	5
Q	(Brazil) R Hocevar	6^{4}	3
(Argentina) G Andreozzi	7^{7}	6
(Brazil) C Zampieri	2	4
WC	(Brazil) CE Severino	6	6
(Argentina) N Kicker	6	4	7^{7}
7	(Chile) H Podlipnik Castillo	1	6	6^{1}
3	(Brazil) J Souza	6	6
WC	(Brazil) O Luz	2	4
Q	(Brazil) Tiago Lopes	2	2
(Argentina) JI Londero	6	6
(Chile) C Garin	2	7^{7}	6
(Bolivia) H Dellien	6	6^{5}	1
Q	(Brazil) P Sakamoto	5	1
6/Alt	(Argentina) F Bagnis	7	6

Second round
1	(Argentina) D Schwartzman	6^{6}	6	6
(Argentina) G Andreozzi	7^{8}	2	2
WC	(Brazil) CE Severino	5	4
(Argentina) N Kicker	7	6
3	(Brazil) J Souza	5	5
(Argentina) JI Londero	7	7
(Chile) C Garin	7^{7}	3	1
6/Alt	(Argentina) F Bagnis	6^{4}	6	6

Quarterfinals
1	(Argentina) D Schwartzman	6	6
(Argentina) N Kicker	1	1
(Argentina) JI Londero	6^{5}	6^{0}
6/Alt	(Argentina) F Bagnis	7^{7}	7^{7}

Semifinals
1	(Argentina) D Schwartzman	6	7^{13}
6/Alt	(Argentina) F Bagnis	3	6^{11}

=== Bottom half ===
First round
8	(Brazil) R Dutra Silva	6	6
(Portugal) FF Silva	2	4
Q	(Brazil) Wilson Leite	4	4
(Chile) JC Sáez	6	6
(Brazil) F Romboli	3	6^{5}
WC	(Brazil) M Zormann	6	7^{7}
WC	(Brazil) Breno Lodis	1	0
4	(Brazil) A Ghem	6	6
5	(Argentina) F Argüello	6	6
(Ecuador) G Lapentti	3	4
(Sweden) C Lindell	7	3	4
(Brazil) G Clezar	5	6	6
(Argentina) A Velotti	6	6^{3}	6
(Argentina) A Molteni	3	7^{7}	1
(Portugal) G Elias	4	1
2	(Argentina) G Pella	6	6

Second round
8	(Brazil) R Dutra Silva	3	2
(Chile) JC Sáez	6	6
WC	(Brazil) M Zormann	6	4	1
4	(Brazil) A Ghem	3	6	6
5	(Argentina) F Argüello	6	6^{1}	6
(Brazil) G Clezar	3	7^{7}	4
(Argentina) A Velotti	2	3
2	(Argentina) G Pella	6	6

Quarterfinals
(Chile) JC Sáez	6	2	0
4	(Brazil) A Ghem	2	6	6
5	(Argentina) F Argüello	6	7
2	(Argentina) G Pella	2	5

Semifinals
4	(Brazil) A Ghem	6^{5}	3
5	(Argentina) F Argüello	7^{7}	6
