= 2016 Campeonato Internacional de Tênis de Campinas =

- Date: 3–9 October
- Edition: 6th
- Surface: Clay
- Location: Campinas, Brazil
- Venue: Sociedade Hípica de Campinas

Champions

Singles
- (Argentina) Facundo Bagnis

Doubles
- (Argentina) Federico Coria / (Argentina) Tomás Lipovšek Puches
| ← 2015 · | Campeonato Internacional de Tênis de Campinas | · 2018 → |

The 2016 Campeonato Internacional de Tênis de Campinas was a professional tennis tournament played on clay courts. It was the sixth edition of the tournament which was part of the 2016 ATP Challenger Tour. It took place in Campinas, Brazil between 3 and 9 October 2016.

== Singles main-draw entrants ==
=== Seeds ===
| Country | Player | Rank^{1} | Seed |
|---|---|---|---|
| ARG | Carlos Berlocq | 72 | 1 |
| BRA | Thiago Monteiro | 87 | 2 |
| ARG | Facundo Bagnis | 92 | 3 |
| ARG | Renzo Olivo | 102 | 4 |
| BRA | Rogério Dutra Silva | 106 | 5 |
| BRA | João Souza | 122 | 6 |
| ARG | Guido Andreozzi | 130 | 7 |
| ARG | Nicolás Kicker | 134 | 8 |

- ^{1} Rankings are as of September 26, 2016.

=== Other entrants ===
The following players received wildcards into the singles main draw:

- (Brazil) Felipe Meligeni Alves
- (Brazil) Fernando Yamacita
- (Brazil) Marcelo Zormann
- (Brazil) Orlando Luz

The following players received entry using a protected ranking:

- (Brazil) Fabiano de Paula

The following players received entry from the qualifying draw:

- (Brazil) Pedro Sakamoto
- (Brazil) Carlos Eduardo Severino
- (Brazil) João Pedro Sorgi
- (Brazil) Bruno Sant'Anna

== Champions ==
=== Singles ===
- (Argentina) Facundo Bagnis def. (Argentina) Carlos Berlocq, 5–7, 6–2, 3–0 RET.

=== Doubles ===
- (Argentina) Federico Coria / (Argentina) Tomás Lipovšek Puches def. (Peru) Sergio Galdós / (Argentina) Máximo González, 6–7^{(4–7)}, 6–4, [10–2].
