= 2013 Tetra Pak Tennis Cup =

Tennis tournament

- Date: 16–22 September
- Edition: 3rd
- Surface: Clay
- Location: Campinas, Brazil

Champions

Singles
- (Brazil) Guilherme Clezar

Doubles
- (Argentina) Guido Andreozzi / (Argentina) Máximo González
← 2012 ·	Tetra Pak Tennis Cup	· 2014 →

The 2013 Tetra Pak Tennis Cup was a professional tennis tournament played on clay courts. It was the third edition of the tournament which was part of the 2013 ATP Challenger Tour. It took place in Campinas, Brazil between 16 and 22 September 2013.

== Singles main draw entrants ==
=== Seeds ===
Country	Player	Rank^{1}	Seed
ARG	Guido Pella	98	1
ARG	Martín Alund	111	2
USA	Wayne Odesnik	122	3
POR	Gastão Elias	131	4
CHI	Paul Capdeville	151	5
ARG	Guido Andreozzi	169	6
ARG	Agustín Velotti	171	7
ARG	Máximo González	185	8

- ^{1} Rankings are as of September 9, 2013.

=== Other entrants ===
The following players received wildcards into the singles main draw:

- (Brazil) Rogério Dutra da Silva
- (Brazil) Fernando Romboli
- (Brazil) Ghilherme Scarpelli
- (Brazil) Caio Zampieri

The following players received entry from the qualifying draw:

- (United States) Mitchell Krueger
- (Peru) Sergio Galdós
- (Argentina) Guillermo Durán
- (Brazil) Tiago Lopes

== Champions ==
=== Singles ===
- (Brazil) Guilherme Clezar def. (Argentina) Facundo Bagnis 6–4, 6–4

=== Doubles ===
- (Argentina) Guido Andreozzi / (Argentina) Máximo González def. (Brazil) Thiago Alves / (Brazil) Thiago Monteiro 6–4, 6–4
