= 2013 Seguros Bolívar Open Pereira – Singles =

Singles
- 2013 Seguros Bolívar Open Pereira

Final
- Champion: (Colombia) Santiago Giraldo
- Runner-up: (Chile) Paul Capdeville
- Score: 6–2, 6–4

Events
Singles	Doubles
← 2012 ·	Seguros Bolívar Open Pereira	· 2014 →

Carlos Salamanca was the defending champion, but lost in the second round to Teymuraz Gabashvili.
Santiago Giraldo won the final 6–2, 6–4 against Paul Capdeville.

== Seeds ==
1. (Italy) Paolo Lorenzi (semifinals)
2. (Colombia) Santiago Giraldo (champion)
3. (Argentina) Federico Delbonis (first round)
4. (Brazil) Rogério Dutra da Silva (quarterfinals)
5. (Brazil) João Souza (semifinals)
6. (Croatia) Ivo Karlović (second round)
7. (Croatia) Antonio Veić (first round)
8. (Colombia) Alejandro González (first round)

== Draw ==
=== Key ===
- Q = Qualifier
- WC = Wild card
- LL = Lucky loser
- Alt = Alternate
- SE = Special exempt
- PR = Protected ranking
- ITF = ITF entry
- JE = Junior exempt
- w/o = Walkover
- r = Retired
- d = Defaulted
- SR = Special ranking

=== Finals ===
Semifinals
1/WC	(Italy) Paolo Lorenzi	4	5
(Chile) Paul Capdeville	6	7
5	(Brazil) João Souza	2	3
2	(Colombia) Santiago Giraldo	6	6

Final
(Chile) Paul Capdeville	2	4
2	(Colombia) Santiago Giraldo	6	6

=== Top half ===
First round
1/WC	(Italy) P Lorenzi	7^{7}	4	6
(Argentina) R Olivo	6^{2}	6	4
Q	(Slovakia) J Kovalík	6	6
Q	(Italy) F Gaio	2	2
(Argentina) F Bagnis	6	2	6
WC	(Colombia) Felipe Escobar	1	6	1
(Brazil) G Clezar	6	6
7	(Croatia) A Veić	4	2
3	(Argentina) F Delbonis	6	6^{3}	6^{2}
(Chile) P Capdeville	1	7^{7}	7^{7}
(Croatia) N Mektić	3	6	1
Alt	(Croatia) T Androić	6	3	6
WC	(Colombia) JS Cabal	3	4
(Brazil) F de Paula	6	6
(Brazil) R Hocevar	6^{5}	6^{4}
6	(Croatia) I Karlović	7^{7}	7^{7}

Second round
1/WC	(Italy) P Lorenzi	1	7^{7}	6
Q	(Slovakia) J Kovalík	6	6^{4}	3
(Argentina) F Bagnis	6	2	7^{7}
(Brazil) G Clezar	0	6	6^{5}
(Chile) P Capdeville	2	6	7
Alt	(Croatia) T Androić	6	2	5
(Brazil) F de Paula	6	7^{7}
6	(Croatia) I Karlović	4	6^{5}

Quarterfinals
1/WC	(Italy) P Lorenzi	6	4	6
(Argentina) F Bagnis	3	6	2
(Chile) P Capdeville	6^{7}	6	6
(Brazil) F de Paula	7^{9}	2	4

Semifinals
1/WC	(Italy) P Lorenzi	4	5
(Chile) P Capdeville	6	7

=== Bottom half ===
First round
5	(Brazil) J Souza	6	6
(Colombia) N Barrientos	4	3
Q	(Venezuela) D Souto	4	3
(Ecuador) JC Campozano	6	6
(Portugal) F Gil	3	3
(Argentina) M Trungelliti	6	6
(Argentina) A Collarini	6	6^{6}	2
4	(Brazil) R Dutra da Silva	3	7^{8}	6
8	(Colombia) A González	6	3	4
(Russia) T Gabashvili	2	6	6
(Colombia) C Salamanca	6	6^{5}	6
WC	(Colombia) E Struvay	3	7^{7}	3
(Chile) J Aguilar	6	6
Q	(Ecuador) I Endara	2	4
(Chile) H Podlipnik Castillo	3	4
2	(Colombia) S Giraldo	6	6

Second round
5	(Brazil) J Souza	6^{6}	6	7^{7}
(Ecuador) JC Campozano	7^{8}	3	6^{4}
(Argentina) M Trungelliti	3	6^{4}
4	(Brazil) R Dutra da Silva	6	7^{7}
(Russia) T Gabashvili	6	6
(Colombia) C Salamanca	2	4
(Chile) J Aguilar	2	2
2	(Colombia) S Giraldo	6	6

Quarterfinals
5	(Brazil) J Souza	6	6
4	(Brazil) R Dutra da Silva	2	3
(Russia) T Gabashvili	4	6	1
2	(Colombia) S Giraldo	6	3	6

Semifinals
5	(Brazil) J Souza	2	3
2	(Colombia) S Giraldo	6	6
