= 2015 Campeonato Internacional de Tênis de Campinas =

- Date: 21–27 September
- Edition: 5th
- Surface: Clay
- Location: Campinas, Brazil

Champions

Singles
- (Argentina) Facundo Argüello

Doubles
- (Argentina) Andrés Molteni / (Chile) Hans Podlipnik
← 2014 ·	Campeonato Internacional de Tênis de Campinas	· 2016 →

The 2015 Campeonato Internacional de Tênis de Campinas was a professional tennis tournament played on clay courts. It was the fifth edition of the tournament which was part of the 2015 ATP Challenger Tour. It took place in Campinas, Brazil between 21 and 27 September 2015.

== Singles main-draw entrants ==
=== Seeds ===
Country	Player	Rank^{1}	Seed
ARG	Diego Schwartzman	68	1
ARG	Guido Pella	92	2
BRA	João Souza	104	3
BRA	André Ghem	136	4
ARG	Facundo Argüello	149	5
ARG	Facundo Bagnis	152	6
CHI	Hans Podlipnik	162	7
BRA	Rogério Dutra Silva	163	8

- ^{1} Rankings are as of September 16, 2015.

=== Other entrants ===
The following players received wildcards into the singles main draw:

- (Brazil) Breno Lodis
- (Brazil) Carlos Eduardo Severino
- (Brazil) Marcelo Zormann
- (Brazil) Orlando Luz

The following players received entry as an alternate:

- (Argentina) Facundo Bagnis

The following players received entry from the qualifying draw:

- (Brazil) Pedro Sakamoto
- (Brazil) Ricardo Hocevar
- (Brazil) Tiago Lopes
- (Brazil) Wilson Leite

== Champions ==
=== Singles ===
- (Argentina) Facundo Argüello def. (Argentina) Diego Schwartzman, 7–5, 6–3.

=== Doubles ===
- (Argentina) Andrés Molteni / (Chile) Hans Podlipnik def. (Brazil) Guilherme Clezar / (Brazil) Fabrício Neis, 3–6, 6–2, [10–0].
