= Thiago Monteiro (tennis) =

Brazilian tennis player (born 1994)

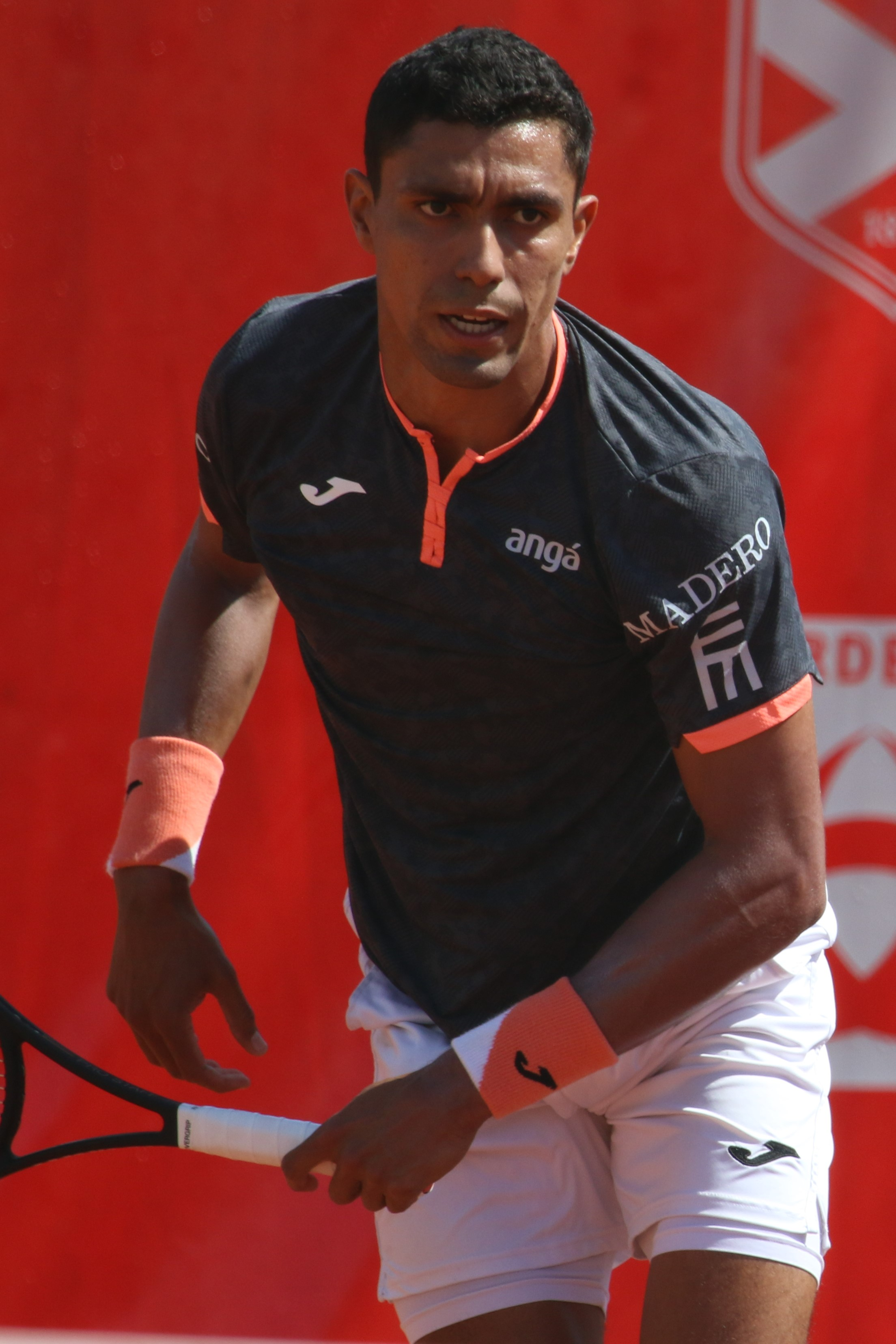
- Monteiro at the 2022 BNP Paribas Primrose Bordeaux
- Full name: Thiago Moura Monteiro
- Country (sports): Brazil
- Residence: Buenos Aires, Argentina
- Born: 31 May 1994 (age 32) Fortaleza, Ceará, Brazil
- Height: 1.83 m (6 ft 0 in)
- Turned pro: 2011
- Plays: Left-handed (two-handed-backhand)
- Coach: Ruben Ramirez-Hidalgo, Pablo Fuentes
- Prize money: US $4,459,636

Singles
- Career record: 94–138
- Career titles: 0
- Highest ranking: No. 61 (17 October 2022)
- Current ranking: No. 235 (5 October 2026)

Grand Slam singles results
- Australian Open: 2R (2021)
- French Open: 3R (2020)
- Wimbledon: 2R (2017)
- US Open: 2R (2022)

Other tournaments
- Olympic Games: 1R (2021, 2024)

Doubles
- Career record: 12–31
- Career titles: 0
- Highest ranking: No. 144 (31 January 2022)

Grand Slam doubles results
- Australian Open: 3R (2021)
- French Open: 1R (2023)
- Wimbledon: 2R (2021)
- US Open: 2R (2021, 2024)

Other doubles tournaments
- Olympic Games: 2R (2024)

Team competitions
- Davis Cup: PO (2016, 2017)
Medal record
Men's tennis
Representing Brazil
Pan American Games
Bronze medal – third place	2023 Santiago	Singles
- Last updated on: 4 October 2026.

Thiago Moura Monteiro (Brazilian Portuguese: [tʃiˈaɡu mõˈtejɾu]; born 31 May 1994) is a Brazilian professional tennis player, who competes on the ATP Challenger Tour. He has a career-high ATP singles ranking of world No. 61, achieved on 17 October 2022 and a doubles ranking of No. 144, reached on 31 January 2022. He is currently the No. 5 Brazilian player. Monteiro has won nine Challenger singles titles – all on clay.

== Early life and background ==
Thiago Moura Monteiro was born on 31 May 1994 in Fortaleza, Brazil. His first introduction to tennis happened when he watched a Gustavo Kuerten match on TV with his brother. Monteiro used to train football at a sports academy where his brother played tennis. He played it for the first time when his brother invited him to a hitting session. Thiago soon started training and playing in local tournaments: in early 2004, he won his first tournament, being only nine years old. Thiago would leave his hometown, Fortaleza, in late 2008 to enter the Larri Passos Academy in Balneário Camboriú to improve his game. He later said on interviews that he would probably be a football player if he had not made that change.

== Junior career ==
Monteiro had a successful junior career, winning many tournaments. Monteiro peaked in the ITF Junior Circuit rankings at world No.2 in February 2012. He ended his junior career with a 77–31 win record on singles and 47–32 on doubles.

In 2004, being ten years old, Monteiro won the Paraíba Tour Tournament. In 2005, Monteiro won the Fortaleza Cup by beating Evandro Alencar in straight sets in the final. In 2006, he captured the first of three titles at the Banana Bowl, in the category u12. 2008 was a very successful year for Monteiro, both in singles and doubles. He won the South-America Tournament of Nations, the Torneio Brasileirão, the Guanabara Open de Tênis (4th and 5th stage), all singles tournaments; and the 1st and 2nd stage of Torneio Nacional Rota-do-Sol (both in singles and doubles). Monteiro also conquered his second Banana Bowl title, category u14. Later that year, Thiago was awarded with Troféu Jornalista Flávio Ponte, at the category Personalidade Esportiva do Ano (Sports Personality of the Year).

To focus on his tennis career, Monteiro moved from his hometown in Fortaleza, to Balneário Camboriú, in Santa Catarina. This change led Thiago to conquer multiple titles in 2009: Copa Claro (3rd stage) and Credicard MasterCard Junior Cup (2nd and 3rd stage), in singles tournaments, and the doubles titles at XIV Goodyear Junior Cup and the Eddie Herr Tennis Championship. Monteiro was also runner-up at the G1 tournament, Orange Bowl, playing in the singles draw. This same year, he won his first points on the ATP rankings by playing two Futures events in the doubles category.

Starting in 2010, Monteiro was number one in both CBT and COSAT ranking. He won his third and final title at the 40th edition of the Banana Bowl, this time in the u16 category, and also made his debut on the ATP Singles Rankings, with his participation in a Future in his birthplace, in Fortaleza. In 2011, Thiago started the year winning the Grade A Copa Gerdau in Porto Alegre, one of the most important tournaments on the ITF Junior Circuit. At 17 years old, Monteiro also won three other clay tournaments: the Asuncion Bowl, the Astrid Bowl, and the Offenbach Tournament. In this last one, he defeated Matias Sborowitz on the final in straight sets.

The Brazilian didn't achieve much success in junior majors: his best results were reaching the third round at the Wimbledon Championships in 2011 and 2012 French Open. He had a better run at doubles: reaching the quarterfinals of the Australian Open and the semifinals at the French Open, both in 2012. Monteiro's last match as a junior was at the 2012 US Open.

== Professional career ==
=== 2011–2013: Early career ===
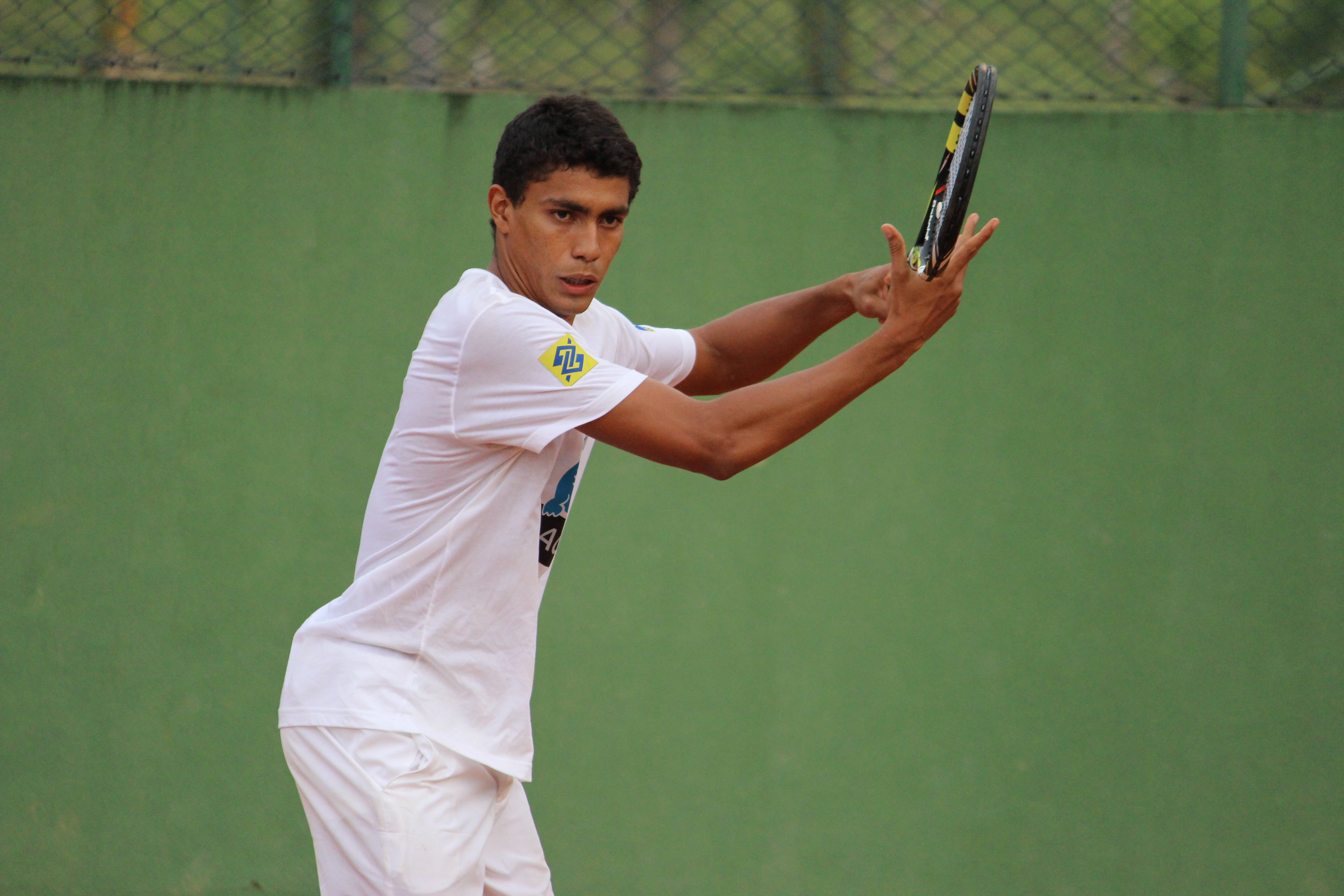
Monteiro training in 2013

In late 2011, Monteiro won his first professional title, the Bahia Open, a Future tournament with US$10,000 in money prize. He battled past his training partner Alexandre Schnitman, winning in close, straight sets. This win led Thiago to receive a wildcard entry on the main draw of Aberto de São Paulo, but he was eliminated on the first round by compatriot André Ghem.

2012 was the last junior year for Monteiro. He played in all junior Grand Slams except Wimbledon and focused on Futures and Challengers tournaments. Monteiro managed to qualify at 2012 Aberto de Florianópolis, in late February, but he was eliminated in the first round by Thiago Alves. In late May, Thiago won his second Futures title, this time on clay, in Bauru. The final was a thrilling three-hour victory over Leonardo Kirche, with Monteiro winning despite losing the first set. The Brazilian was runner-up on two other Futures played in Brazil: at São José do Rio Preto in August and at Porto Alegre in October. Thiago ended the year with a career ranking of 439, after starting the year at the position 701.

Entering 2013 as the first year that Thiago would play a full season as a senior professional, he was invited a second time to enter Aberto de São Paulo main draw, but couldn't make it past the first round again, losing to countryman Guilherme Clezar in straight sets. Monteiro later played in consecutive Futures events in the United States without much success. He tried to break through the qualifiers of Brasil Open a month later, but lost to Thiago Alves in the first round. In March, Thiago did a very successful run in Turkey: he won two back-to-back Futures, with 15 consecutive victories over two weeks. His first title there was against Czech Jan Minar, winning in straight sets. A week later, he defeated the Dominican José Hernández also in straight sets. He also won his first Futures title in doubles, partnering Maximiliano Estévez, from Argentina, defeating in the finals the partnership of Kirill Dmitriev and Yaraslav Shyla in the super tiebreak.

Thiago would also reach the finals of another Futures event, this time in the Netherlands, in June, but he couldn't win his 5th title. He lost in the final to Bjorn Fratangelo in three sets. Thiago broke through multiple Challenger qualifiers later in the year, including Sport 1 Open in Netherlands, the Poznań Open in Poland, the Oberstaufen Cup in Germany, and the Uruguay Open. His best results were in the quarterfinals in Germany and Netherlands, a performance he also achieved in IS Open and Aberto Rio Preto, but he didn't need to play the qualifiers in the latter. In doubles, Thiago reached the finals of Tetra Pak Tennis Cup partnering Thiago Alves, but they lost in straight sets against the Argentinian team of Guido Andreozzi and Máximo González. He also reached the semifinals of IS Open and Aberto Rio Preto, partnering Thiago Alves in the first and Rogério Dutra Silva in the latter, achieving his career high in the doubles ranking: 449th. He ended in the 276th position in the singles ranking.

=== 2014–2015: Injuries, second doubles title ===
Thiago's year started only in late February due to an injury on his left knee. He attempted to qualify to Brasil Open, but lost in the second round to Dušan Lajović in straight sets. In March, Thiago qualified to Visit Panamá Cup, defeating Alexander Zverev on his way, but Monteiro lost in the first round. Thiago's 5th Futures title came in late June, in the Netherlands, where he defeated Boy Westerhof in three sets. Thiago was not able to repeat his runs in the Challenger Tour as he did in 2013. His rank dropped down to 563rd by the end of the year. In doubles, Thiago reached the finals of two Futures (one in Netherlands, one in Dominican Republic), but wasn't able to win his 2nd title in either.

Trying to recover his positions in the ATP rankings, Thiago tried to break through multiple qualifiers of ATP World Tour tournaments. He attempted to do so in clay events, reaching the final qualifying round in the Argentina Open and the U.S. Men's Clay Court Championships, losing respectively to Facundo Bagnis and Rogério Dutra Silva. While his run on qualifiers wasn't much successful on the ATP World Tour, Thiago had better success at the ATP Challenger Tour. Over the year, Thiago entered 11 qualifier draws, breaking through 5 of them. Monteiro's also played his last Futures event to date, playing two weeks in Georgia in both singles and doubles. Partnering with the Italian Marco Bortolotti, the left-hander won his 2nd Futures title by defeating the Russian partnership of Victor Badula and Ivan Kalinin in straight sets.

Almost a month later, playing in the qualifiers of Poprad-Tatry ATP Challenger Tour, Thiago badly injured his left knee while holding a match point against Czech Robin Stanek and was forced to retire. He stayed away from the courts for three months, returning in the Campeonato Internacional de Tênis de Campinas qualifiers. Monteiro lost in the final qualifying round to Tiago Lopes in three sets. The Brazilian best run at a Challenger event was in November, at the Challenger Ciudad de Guayaquil, passing through the qualifiers and reaching the quarter-finals, where he had to retire against the eventual runner-up, Guido Pella. Thiago ended in the 470th position in the singles ranking.

=== 2016: ATP Tour and top 100 debut, first Challenger title ===
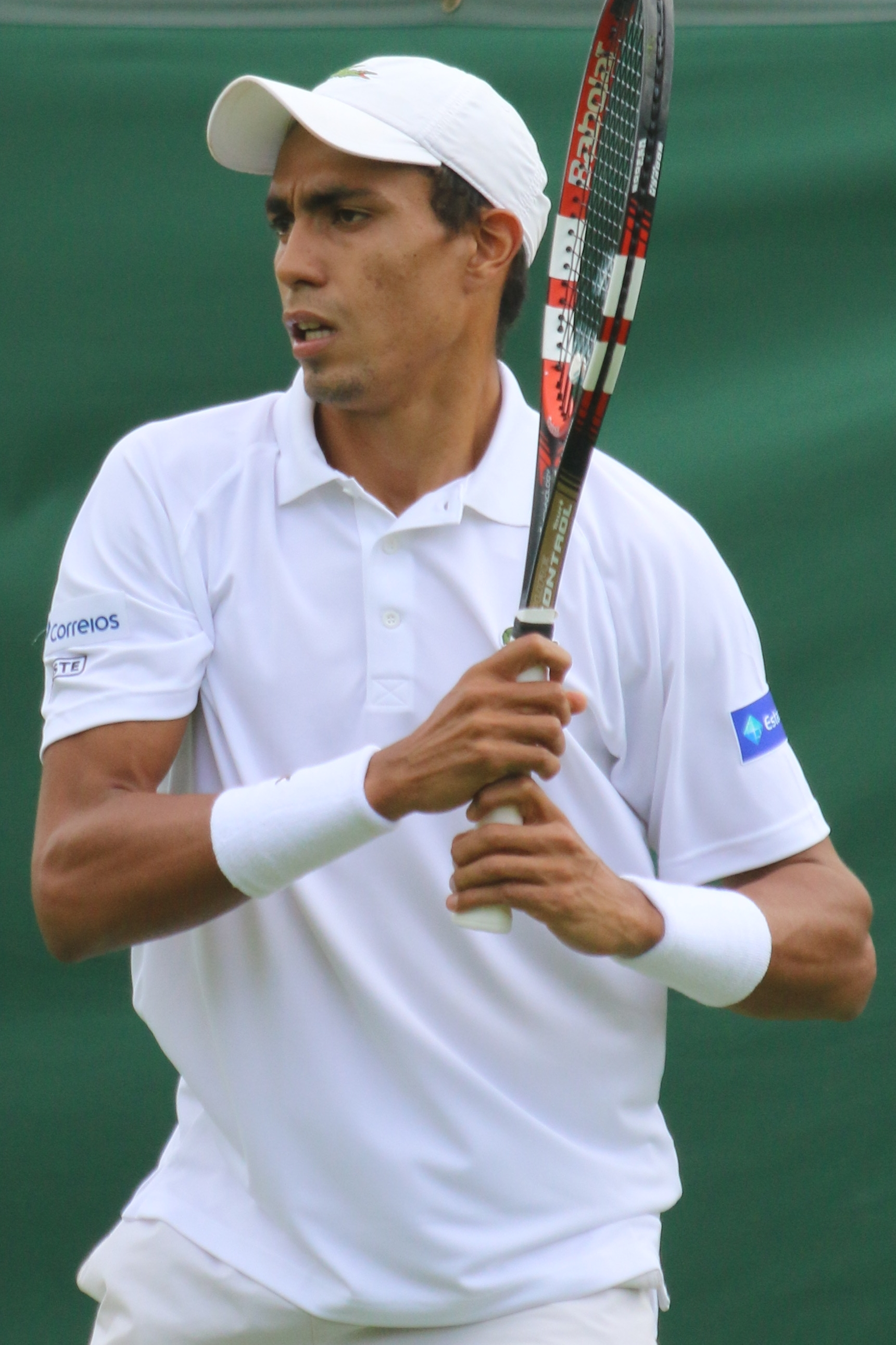
Monteiro at the 2016 Wimbledon Championships.

Ranked at the beginning of the year at No. 463, Thiago started strong, qualifying to Torneo de Mendoza main draw and reaching the quarterfinals, where Monteiro lost to eventual champion Gerald Melzer in straight sets. The left-hander received a wildcard invite to Vivo Tennis Cup main draw, where he reached the semifinals of a Challenger event for the first time, losing again to the 'would-be' champion of the tournament, this time to Facundo Bagnis.

This performance led him to receive a wildcard into Rio Open main draw where he would face Jo-Wilfried Tsonga, the third seed and world No. 9 at the time. Thiago (ranked No. 338) stunned Tsonga in three sets, to set a meeting with Pablo Cuevas. Monteiro lost in straight sets, and his opponent won the tournament, defeating Guido Pella in the final. The surprise performance led Monteiro to receive a second wildcard, this time to play into Brasil Open main draw. Thiago started strong, defeating two Spaniards, Nicolás Almagro in the first round and Daniel Muñoz de la Nava in the second, to reach the third round and set another battle against Pablo Cuevas. Thiago triumphed in the first set this time, but Cuevas turned the game and won the match. Cuevas also won this tournament, beating Pablo Carreño Busta in the final.

After rising 98 positions in the rankings, Thiago returned to play on Challenger events, this time all over America. Playing in four tournaments, he reached the semifinals in two of them. The first one was the Challenger ATP Cachantún Cup, where he lost to countryman Rogério Dutra Silva, in March. The other semifinal was his second Challenger event in Brazil in 2016, the São Paulo Challenger de Tênis, where seeded third, he lost to Gonzalo Lama in three sets.

Returning to Europe, Thiago entered the Open du Pays d'Aix draw unseeded, and with a strong performance, he conquered the title by beating Carlos Berlocq in the final. Thiago played two other tournaments without the same success, before entering the French Open qualifying draw as the 30th seed. Monteiro was beaten in straight sets by Ruben Bemelmans. A week later, Monteiro had a rematch with Bemelmans in the first round of the Franken Challenge, defeating him in straight sets. Thiago later lost in the quarterfinals to Tobias Kamke. Playing in another clay tournament in France, Monteiro reached a second Challenger final, this time at the Open Sopra Steria de Lyon. Seeded 5th, he faced another Belgian this time, Steve Darcis. The left-hander took the first set, but the Belgian grew in the match, turning it into three sets.

Before attempting to qualify for his second Grand Slam, Monteiro played at the Internationaux de Tennis de Blois but withdrew from the second round match against Miljan Zekić, citing a back injury. At the Wimbledon Championships qualifying, Thiago was eliminated again in the first round, this time to Julian Reister. To improve his position in the ATP rankings, Thiago attempted and qualified for the German Open main draw. The Brazilian won three matches against three Germans players (two in the qualifiers, and Mischa Zverev in the main draw), to set a third match against Pablo Cuevas. Cuevas delivered Monteiro's third loss in the ATP World Tour, but this time he did not win the tournament, being runner-up instead. Thiago qualified for a consecutive World Tour appearance this time at Swiss Open Gstaad. Monteiro was defeated by Robin Haase in the third round. The Brazilian defeated Antoine Bellier in the first round and the second seed, and top 30 Gilles Simon in the second round.

Attempting to break into the top 100, Monteiro entered as the top seed in the BB&T Atlanta Open qualifiers. He breezed past American Trent Bryde, winning in straight sets and recording a bagel, but lost to Christopher Eubanks in straight sets, at the final round. However, Rajeev Ram withdrew from the tournament, and Monteiro was awarded a lucky loser entry into the main draw. Unfortunately for Thiago, he didn't have the same luck during the first round match, against Tim Smyczek. Monteiro had the opportunity to serve for the match at 5–4 during the second set, but Smyczek denied his chances and won the match in three sets. Thiago also did his debut in doubles in Atlanta, playing with Yoshihito Nishioka, but they lost at the super tiebreak against American partnership of Zack Kennedy and Christopher Eubanks.

A week later, Thiago entered directly into the main draw of an ATP event for the first time, the Los Cabos Open; but lost in the first round to Dušan Lajović in straight sets.

Thiago finally broke the Top 100 milestone after winning in the first round of the Western & Southern Open qualifiers against veteran Ivan Dodig in straight sets. However, Thiago failed to qualify as he lost in the final round to Jiří Veselý in three sets. The win also won Monteiro the second spot in the Brazilian Top 10 singles for the first time in his career. Later at the end of August, Thiago tried to qualify at the US Open, but for the third time in the qualifiers, he lost at the first round. After the US Open, Thiago was invited for the first time to play in the Davis Cup. He entered the team to play against Belgium, opening the rubbers against David Goffin. Monteiro lost in straight sets, and Brazil finished the series 0–4. Following his unsuccessful run at the Davis Cup, Thiago entered the Campeonato Internacional de Tenis de Santos as the 2nd seed. He went on to his third Challenger final, losing in straight sets to Renzo Olivo. Thiago ended his year with two other quarterfinals (Campinas and Buenos Aires) and a semifinal (Santiago) appearance at Challenger events.

=== 2017: ATP 500 quarterfinal, major debut, first wins ===
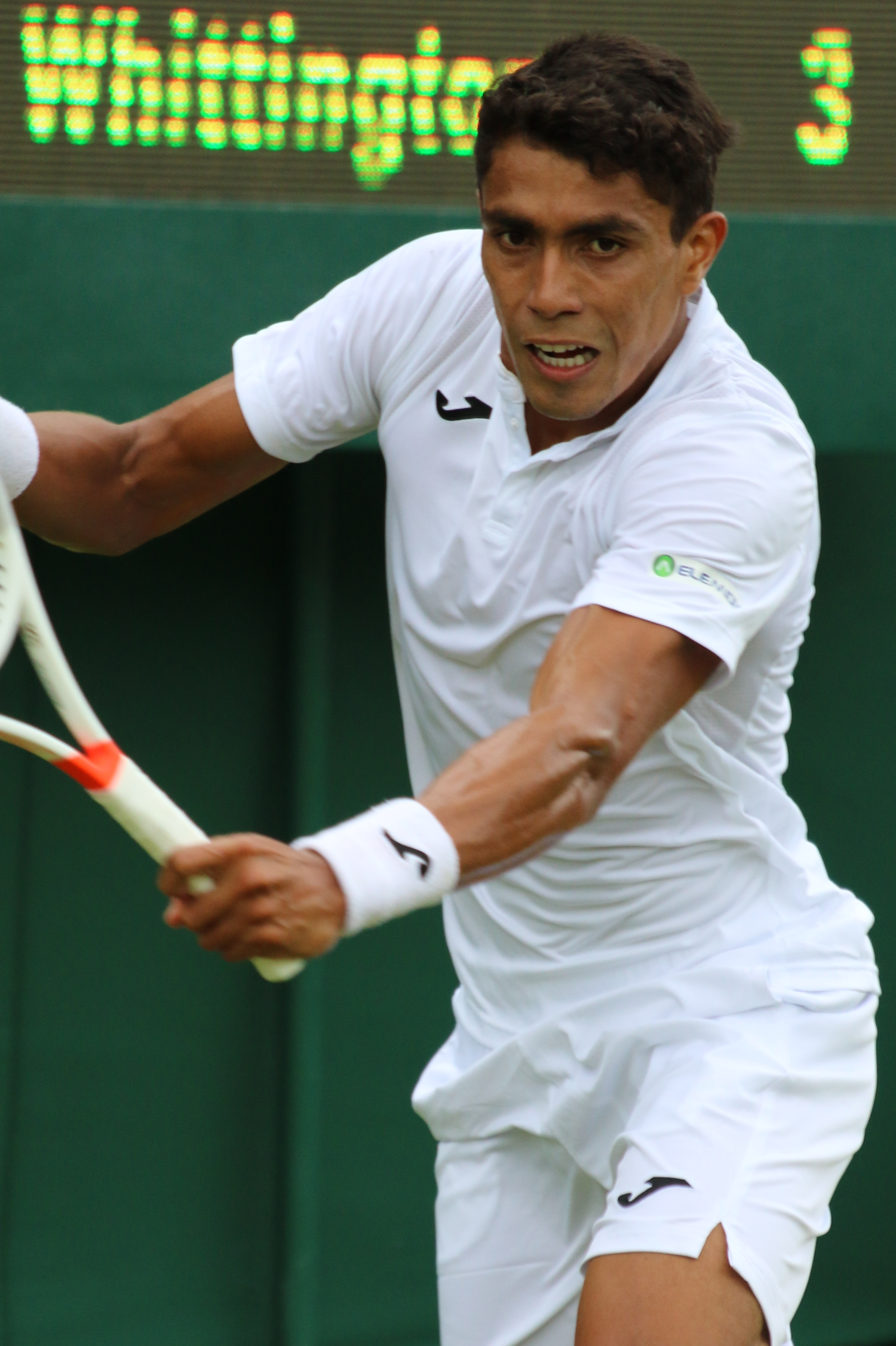
Monteiro at the 2017 Wimbledon Championships

Thiago started his year at Chennai Open, losing in the first round to Daniil Medvedev. A week later, he entered the Sydney International qualifiers drew and passed through it, but he came short again in the first round, losing to Daniel Evans. Ranked No. 83, Thiago's ranking was enough for him to enter the Australian Open main draw directly. He set a rematch against Jo-Wilfried Tsonga but could not reproduce the tennis from their first match, losing in four sets.

Entering the Ecuador Open, Monteiro's performance was disappointing; he lost another match in the first round, this time to Giovanni Lapentti. He also entered the doubles draw there, playing with Thomaz Bellucci, but they came short in the first round. Playing on Argentinian soil, Monteiro passed the first round, defeating ex-top 10 Tommy Robredo en route to the quarterfinals of the Argentina Open, before losing to local player Carlos Berlocq in three sets. Monteiro made a consecutive quarterfinal appearance, this time at the ATP 500 Rio Open, beating Gastão Elias and compatriot Thomaz Bellucci before losing to Casper Ruud. Entering another his home tournament, the Brasil Open, Thiago lost for the second time in a row to Carlos Berlocq.

A couple of weeks later, in his Masters 1000 main draw debut at Indian Wells Masters, Monteiro lost in a close match to Martin Kližan, losing a set point in the first set tiebreak and six break point opportunities overall. In another close match, Monteiro was also eliminated in the first round of the Miami Open, this time by Viktor Troicki in three sets.

Following the first two Masters of the season, Monteiro played two singles rubbers for his country at the Davis Cup, winning both to help Brazil win 5–0 against Ecuador, classifying his country to the World Group play-offs. Starting the spring clay court season, he entered the U.S. Men's Clay Court Championships main draw. At the maroon clay courts, Thiago defeated seventh seed Donald Young in straight sets but lost in three to Ernesto Escobedo. At the Barcelona Open, Thiago qualified for the main draw, but lost to Daniel Evans in the first round. A week after, in the first round of BMW Open, he lost to Marius Copil.

At the 2017 French Open he recorded his first win at a Major defeating wildcard Alexandre Müller. He followed this by another win at the 2017 Wimbledon Championships over qualifier Andrew Whittington (tennis).

=== 2018: First ATP semifinal, ATP 500 quarterfinal ===
In February 2018, Monteiro reached his first ATP 250 semifinal in Quito, Ecuador, after defeating world No. 43, Frenchman Gaël Monfils. In the semi-final he ended up being eliminated by the No. 21 in the world, the Spaniard Albert Ramos Viñolas, with scores of 6–4, 6–7 (4) and 6–4. He then played several tournaments during the year, with poor results, until reaching the ATP 500 in Hamburg, in July, where he reached his second quarterfinal at the ATP 500 level. Thiago played the qualifier where he won the first game and lost in the second but the Luck allowed him to compete in the main draw as a lucky loser. After beating the No. 39 in the world, Frenchman Gilles Simon, 7–6(2) and 6–2 in the first round, in the round of 16, he played a battle against the world No. 33, the Spaniard Fernando Verdasco, winning by 3–6, 6–2 and 7–5. Qualifying for a spot in the semifinals, he was eliminated in three sets by Slovak Jozef Kovalík.

In September, he reached his second Challenger semifinal of the year again in Italy in the city of Biella. The following week, Thiago reached his third Challenger semifinal in Campinas. In October, he reached his fourth Challenger semifinal of the year in the city of Lima, Peru.

=== 2019: Three Challenger titles ===
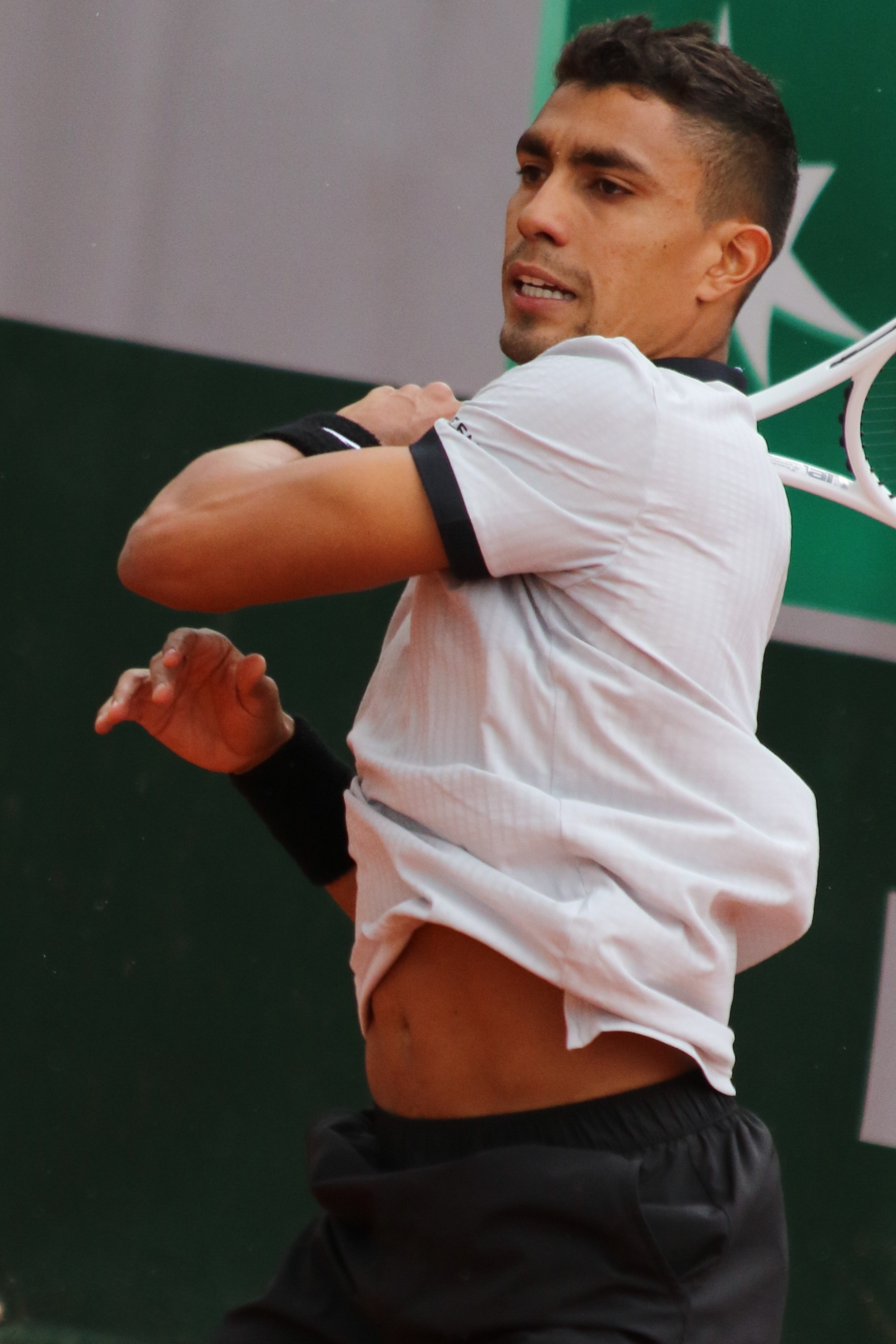
Monteiro at the 2019 French Open.

In 2019, Thiago Monteiro started the year as No. 127 in the world, and ended it as No. 89. He won 3 Challengers titles in Punta del Este, Braunschweig, and Lima, in addition to making the semifinals in Santo Domingo and Buenos Aires. However, he did not achieve significant results on the ATP level. His biggest win was at the ATP 250 in Munich where he defeated world No. 48 Jan-Lennard Struff.

=== 2020: French Open third round ===
In 2020, Thiago Monteiro started the year as No. 87 in the world, and ended it as No. 84. This year, he became two-time champion of the Punta del Este Challenger, beating world No. 77 Marco Cecchinato in the final. He also reached the quarter-finals at the ATP 250 in Buenos Aires, defeating world No. 31, Borna Coric, in the round of 16. He reached another quarterfinal at the ATP 250 in Santiago. In September, he was a finalist in the Forli Challenger. Monteiro reached the first Grand Slam third round in his career at the 2020 French Open defeating 31st seed Nikoloz Basilashvili, and Marcos Giron before he lost to Márton Fucsovics.

=== 2021: Australian Open first win, Olympics debut ===
At the 2021 Australian Open, he reached the second round for the first time at this Major, where he lost to world No. 8 Andrey Rublev. In 2021, Thiago Monteiro started the year as No. 84 in the world, and ended it as No. 89. Monteiro reached the semifinals of the ATP 250 in Melbourne, the quarterfinals of the ATP 250 in Cordoba, won the Challenger in Braga and was runner-up in the Challengers in Buenos Aires and Campinas.

In July 2021, Monteiro qualified to represent Brazil at the 2020 Summer Olympics.

=== 2022: Top 65 debut ===
Monteiro started 2022 as no.89 in the world. He reached the quarterfinals of the ATP 250 in Adelaide, after winning 2 qualifying games and defeating Gael Monfils in the 2nd round of the main draw. At the ATP 500 in Rio de Janeiro, he beat Sebastian Baez but lost to top 10 Matteo Berrettini in the 2nd round. He made the quarterfinals again in other ATP 250s, in Santiago in February, and in Belgrade in April.

In July 2022, Monteiro won his seventh Challenger in Salzburg, beating Norbert Gombos in the final, reaching a career-high of world No. 73 on 11 July 2022 in the ATP rankings.

Monteiro won his first match at the 2022 US Open defeating Alex Molcan, reaching the second round for the first time at this major. He reached a new career-high ranking of world No. 61 on 17 October 2022 following his title at the 2022 AON Open Challenger in Genoa, Italy.

=== 2023: First Masters wins, out of top 150 ===
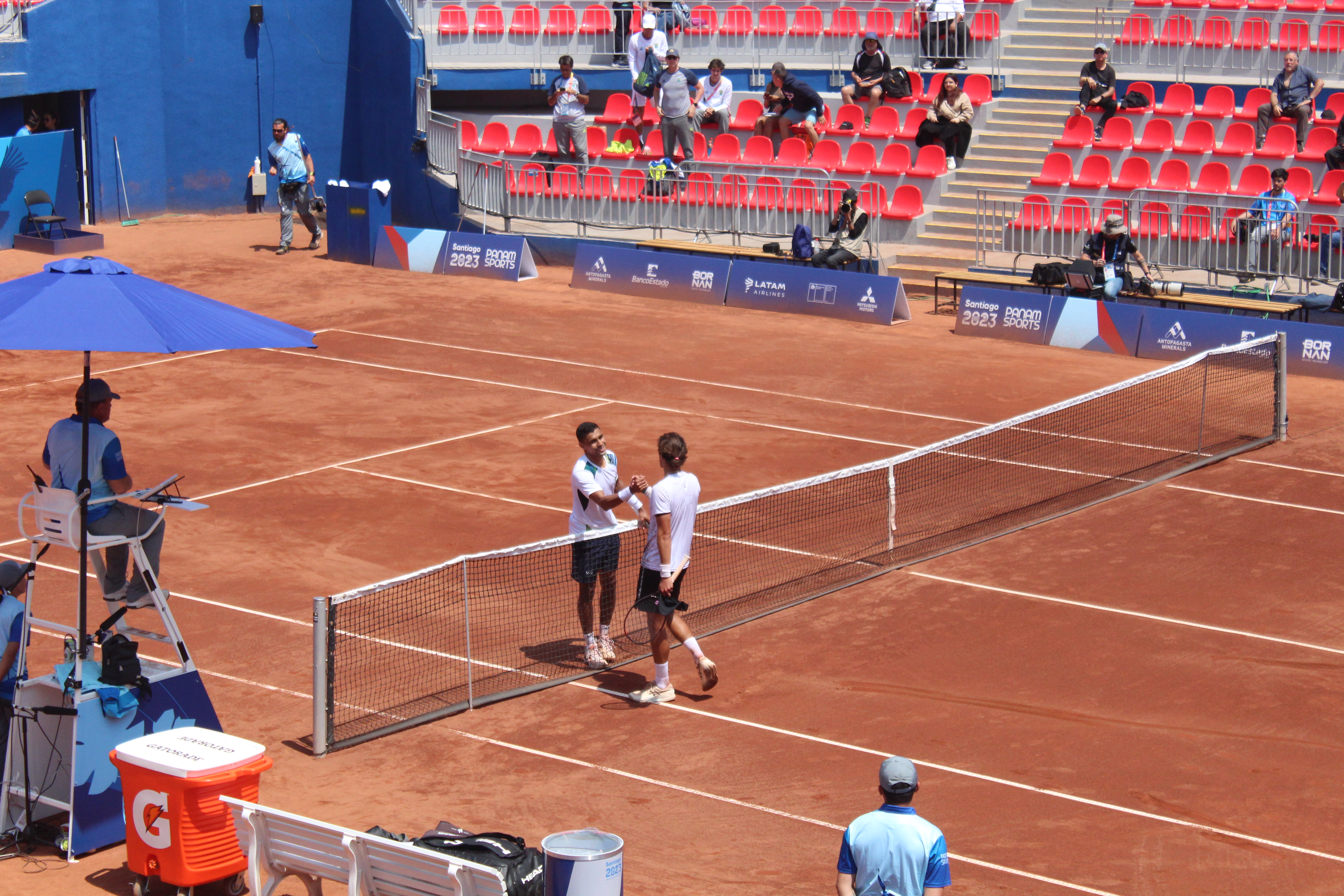
Monteiro at the 2023 Pan American Games.

At his home tournament, the 2023 Rio Open, Monteiro defeated former No. 3 Dominic Thiem in three sets in the first round for his first win of the season. He lost to second seed and eventual winner Cameron Norrie. The following week at the 2023 Chile Open he reached the quarterfinals defeating fifth seed Albert Ramos Viñolas and Marco Cecchinato.

At the 2023 Miami Open he recorded his first Masters win defeating Jason Kubler and almost defeated world no.9 Felix Auger-Aliassime in the second round. He followed it with a second Masters win at the 2023 Mutua Madrid Open over qualifier Borna Gojo, and in the second round, he played evenly with No. 12 Karen Khachanov but was also eliminated.

At the Masters 1000 in Rome in May, Monteiro was defeated by the top 20 player Borna Coric in the second round, in a close match. As a result, a few months later, Monteiro ended up dropping out of the world's top 150.

In September, Monteiro began his recovery, where he reached the semifinals of the Challenger 125 in Genoa, Italy, and the following week, participating in the Davis Cup, he obtained one of the biggest victories of his career, defeating world No.4 Holger Rune in Denmark, on hardcourts, helping Brazil win the match 3–0. With the momentum obtained by the result of the Davis Cup, Monteiro soon won the Campinas Challenger. Monteiro also reached the semifinals of the Santa Fe Challenger, and was runner-up in the Montevideo Challenger, at the end of 2023.

In October, Monteiro also won a bronze medal at the 2023 Pan American Games.

=== 2024: Win over World No. 2, first Masters fourth round ===
At the 2024 Rio Open where he entered as a wildcard, he recorded a victory over top seed and World No. 2 Carlos Alcaraz after his retirement due to an ankle injury. He increased officially his ATP Head2Head to 2–0 over Alcaraz, having defeated the former World No. 1 in their only previous meeting at the Melbourne-1 ATP 250 in 2021. He then reached a second quarterfinal at this tournament defeating compatriot Felipe Meligeni Alves.

Ranked No. 118, he reached the third round at the 2024 Mutua Madrid Open after qualifying, with wins over Dušan Lajović and sixth seed Stefanos Tsitsipas, having never advanced beyond the second round of an ATP Masters 1000 event.

At the Masters 1000 in Rome, Monteiro, coming from qualifying, won four consecutive matches without losing a set, defeating Gael Monfils and 32nd seed Jordan Thompson, to reach a second consecutive third round of a Masters 1000, and only the second in his career. Monteiro had a long battle against the world No. 58 Miomir Kecmanović, winning the tiebreak of the last set and reaching the fourth round of a Masters for the first time in his career. He was the first Brazilian to reach the fourth round at this event since Thomaz Bellucci in 2016.

Ranked No. 84, he qualified for the main draw of the 2024 French Open with a win over Daniel Rincón.

== Playing style ==
Monteiro's game is based primarily on a baseline game, with topspin groundstrokes to counterpunch the opponents' attacks. Thiago constantly uses his lefty forehand to move his opponents around the court, winning most points with it. Being a left-hander that is more acquainted with clay courts, his style is somewhat similar to one of his idols, Rafael Nadal.

Even though he trained in clay courts during most of his tennis life, Monteiro's adaptation to hard courts especially was noted by tennis critics in 2016. On these surfaces, Thiago varies his game more, using volleys and slices more than on clay.

== Personal life ==
Monteiro grew up on a foster family. He has three sisters - Letícia, Jéssica, and Flávia - and an older brother, Fáber Monteiro, who works as a real estate broker. Besides Portuguese, he is also fluent in English, Spanish and Italian.

Monteiro uses his spare time to enjoy movies and spend it with friends and family. He attended college classes online. He dated fellow Brazilian tennis player Beatriz Haddad Maia in the past.

== Equipment and endorsements ==
As of October 2014, Monteiro has been training at Tennis Route Academy, at Rio de Janeiro, where other prominent Brazilian players train, including Marcelo Demoliner and Beatriz Haddad Maia. Lacoste was Thiago's clothing brand until January 2017, when he signed with the Spanish brand Joma. He uses Babolat racquets. Other sponsors include Elemidia (since February 2017), Correios, and Fundação Beto Studart (since 2009).

== Performance timelines ==
Key
W	F	SF	QF	#R	RR	Q#	P#	DNQ	A	Z#	PO	G	S	B	NMS	NTI	P	NH

(W) winner; (F) finalist; (SF) semifinalist; (QF) quarterfinalist; (#R) rounds 4, 3, 2, 1; (RR) round-robin stage; (Q#) qualification round; (P#) preliminary round; (DNQ) did not qualify; (A) absent; (Z#) Davis/Fed Cup Zonal Group (with number indication) or (PO) play-off; (G) gold, (S) silver or (B) bronze Olympic/Paralympic medal; (NMS) not a Masters tournament; (NTI) not a Tier I tournament; (P) postponed; (NH) not held; (SR) strike rate (events won / competed); (W–L) win–loss record.
To avoid confusion and double counting, these charts are updated at the conclusion of a tournament or when the player's participation has ended.

=== Singles ===
Current through the 2026 Rio Open.

Tournament	2015	2016	2017	2018	2019	2020	2021	2022	2023	2024	2025	2026	SR	W–L	Win (%)
Grand Slam tournaments
Australian Open	A	A	1R	Q1	Q3	1R	2R	1R	1R	A	1R		0 / 6	1–6	17%
French Open	A	Q1	2R	Q1	1R	3R	2R	Q1	1R	1R	1R		0 / 7	4–7	36%
Wimbledon	A	Q1	2R	Q1	1R	NH	1R	1R	1R	1R	Q1		0 / 6	1–6	14%
US Open	A	Q1	1R	Q2	1R	1R	1R	2R	Q1	1R	Q1		0 / 6	1–6	14%
Win–loss	0–0	0–0	2–4	0–0	0–3	2–3	2–4	1–3	0–3	0–3	0–2		0 / 25	7–25	22%
ATP Masters 1000
Indian Wells Open	A	A	1R	A	A	NH	1R	A	1R				0 / 3	0–3	0%
Miami Open	A	A	1R	Q1	1R	NH	A	Q1	2R	Q1			0 / 3	1–3	25%
Monte-Carlo Masters	A	A	A	A	A	NH	Q1	A	A				0 / 0	0–0	0%
Madrid Open	A	A	Q1	A	A	NH	Q1	A	2R	3R	Q2		0 / 2	3–2	60%
Italian Open	A	A	1R	A	A	Q1	Q2	A	2R	4R	Q1		0 / 3	4–3	57%
Canadian Open	A	A	A	A	A	NH	A	A	A				0 / 0	0–0	0%
Cincinnati Open	A	Q2	A	A	A	Q2	Q1	Q2	A				0 / 0	0–0	0%
Shanghai Masters	A	A	Q1	A	A	NH			A				0 / 0	0–0	0%
Paris Masters	A	A	A	A	A	A	A	Q2	A				0 / 0	0–0	0%
Win–loss	0–0	0–0	0–3	0–0	0–1	0–0	0–1	0–0	3–4	5–2	0–0		0 / 11	8–11	42%
National representation
Summer Olympics	NH	A	NH				1R	NH					0 / 1	0–1	0%
Davis Cup	A	PO	PO	Q	Q	QR							0 / 0	8–9	47%
Career statistics
	2015	2016	2017	2018	2019	2020	2021	2022	2023	2024	2025		SR	W–L	Win (%)
Tournaments	0	6	22	8	11	7	16	18	16	11	6	1	Total: 122		
Titles	0	0	0	0	0	0	0	0	0	0	0	0	Total: 0		
Finals	0	0	0	0	0	0	0	0	0	0	0	0	Total: 0		
Overall win-loss	0–0	6–7	13–24	10–10	5–12	8–10	13–16	15–21	9–17	13–13	2–7	0–1	0 / 122	94–138	41%
Win (%)	0%	46%	35%	50%	29%	44%	45%	42%	35%	50%	35%	0%	Total: 41%		
Year-end ranking (Note: 2011: ATP ranking-699, 2012: ATP ranking: 439, 2013: ATP ranking: 276, 2014: ATP ranking-470.)	463	82	124	120	89	84	88	73	122	109	186		$4,459,636		

== National and international representation ==
=== Davis Cup ===
As a Junior, Monteiro participated in the Junior Davis Cup, playing in 2010. The Brazilian team finished in the 7th position that year.

As a senior, he was first nominated to play for Brazil in Davis Cup after reaching the No. 2 spot in singles for his country. He played against Belgium in 2016, with Brazil losing the tie 0–4, and returning to the Zonal Group. Thiago was later nominated to play against Ecuador in 2017. He won his two matches, including the final match of the tie (a dead rubber). Monteiro was the no.1 singles player for Brazil against a Japanese team who missed most of its top players in a tie to decide a World Group spot for 2018. However, Brazil failed to capitalize on the opportunity, with both matches lost boy him.

Being the team singles No.1 for a second time, this turn against the Dominican Republic, Monteiro failed to confirm his ranking superiority, losing his second match against No.184 José Hernández-Fernández after winning against Roberto Cid Subervi. Brazil went on to win the tie 3–2, anyway, in the 1st round of the 2018 Davis Cup Americas Zone Group I.

Currently, Monteiro holds a 13–13 record in Davis Cup matches. He has played only singles matches thus far.

All Davis Cup Matches: 7–6 (Singles: 7–6)
2016 Davis Cup World Group play-offs
Round	Date	Opponent	Final match score	Location	Surface	Match	Opponent	Rubber Score
QR	September 16–18, 2016	Belgium	0–4	Ostend	Hard (i)	Singles 1	David Goffin	2–6, 2–6, 0–6
2017 Davis Cup Americas Zone Group I
Round	Date	Opponent	Final match score	Location	Surface	Match	Opponent	Rubber Score
2R	April 7–9, 2017	Ecuador	5–0	Ambato	Clay	Singles 2	Roberto Quiroz	6–7^{(6–8)}, 7–6^{(7–0)}, 6–3, 7–6^{(9–7)}
2R	April 7–9, 2017	Ecuador	5–0	Ambato	Clay	Singles 5	Gonzalo Escobar	6–7^{(5–7)}, 6–4, 6–3
2017 Davis Cup World Group play-offs
Round	Date	Opponent	Final match score	Location	Surface	Match	Opponent	Rubber Score
QR	September 15–17, 2017	Japan	1–3	Osaka	Hard	Singles 2	Go Soeda	6–3, 4–6, 3–6, 7–6^{(7–1)}, 4–6
QR	September 15–17, 2017	Japan	1–3	Osaka	Hard	Singles 4	Yūichi Sugita	3–6, 2–6, 3–6
2018 Davis Cup Americas Zone Group I
Round	Date	Opponent	Final match score	Location	Surface	Match	Opponent	Rubber Score
1R	February 2–3, 2018	Dominican Republic	3–2	Santo Domingo	Hard	Singles 2	Roberto Cid Subervi	6–7^{(6–8)}, 7–5, 6–2
1R	February 2–3, 2018	Dominican Republic	3–2	Santo Domingo	Hard	Singles 4	José Hernández-Fernández	4–6, 6–7^{(4–7)}
2R	April 6–7, 2018	Colombia	2–3	Barranquilla	Hard	Singles 1	Santiago Giraldo	6–1, 6–2
2R	April 6–7, 2018	Colombia	2–3	Barranquilla	Hard	Singles 4	Daniel Elahi Galán	3–6, 3–6
2019 Davis Cup final qualifying round
Round	Date	Opponent	Final match score	Location	Surface	Match	Opponent	Rubber Score
QR	February 1–2, 2019	Belgium	1–3	Uberlândia	Clay (i)	Singles 1	Arthur De Greef	6–3, 6–2
QR	February 1–2, 2019	Belgium	1–3	Uberlândia	Clay (i)	Singles 4	Kimmer Coppejans	3–6, 4–6
2019 Davis Cup Americas Zone Group I
Round	Date	Opponent	Final match score	Location	Surface	Match	Opponent	Rubber Score
QR	September 13–14, 2019	Barbados	3–1	Criciuma	Clay	Singles 2	Haydn Lewis	6–2, 6–2
QR	September 13–14, 2019	Barbados	3–1	Criciuma	Clay	Singles 4	Darian King	6–4, 7–6^{(8–6)}

== ATP Challenger Tour finals ==
=== Singles: 18 (9 titles, 9 runner-ups) ===
Legend ATP Challenger (9–9)	Finals by surface Hard (–) Clay (9–9)

Result	W–L	Date	Tournament	Surface	Opponent	Score
Win	1–0	May 2016	Pays d'Aix Open, France	Clay	(Argentina) Carlos Berlocq	4–6, 6–4, 6–1
Loss	1–1	Jun 2016	Lyon Open, France	Clay	(Belgium) Steve Darcis	6–3, 2–6, 0–6
Loss	1–2	Sep 2016	Santos International, Brazil	Clay	(Argentina) Renzo Olivo	4–6, 6–7^{(5–7)}
Win	2–2	Jan 2019	Punta Open, Uruguay	Clay	(Argentina) Facundo Argüello	3–6, 6–2, 6–3
Win	3–2	Jul 2019	Sparkassen Open, Germany	Clay	(Germany) Tobias Kamke	7–6^{(8–6)}, 6–1
Win	4–2	Oct 2019	Lima Challenger, Peru	Clay	(Argentina) Federico Coria	6–2, 6–7^{(7–9)}, 6–4
Win	5–2	Jan 2020	Punta Open, Uruguay (2)	Clay	(Italy) Marco Cecchinato	7–6^{(7–3)}, 6–7^{(6–8)}, 7–5
Loss	5–3	Sep 2020	Forlì International, Italy	Clay	(Italy) Lorenzo Musetti	6–7^{(2–7)}, 6–7^{(5–7)}
Win	6–3	Sep 2021	Braga Open, Portugal	Clay	(Serbia) Nikola Milojević	7–5, 7–5
Loss	6–4	Oct 2021	Buenos Aires Challenger, Argentina	Clay	(Argentina) Sebastián Báez	4–6, 0–6
Loss	6–5	Nov 2021	Campinas International, Brazil	Clay	(Argentina) Sebastián Báez	1–6, 4–6
Win	7–5	Jul 2022	Salzburg Open, Austria	Clay	(Slovakia) Norbert Gombos	6–3, 7–6^{(7–2)}
Win	8–5	Sep 2022	AON Open, Italy	Clay	(Italy) Andrea Pellegrino	6–1, 7–6^{(7–2)}
Win	9–5	Oct 2023	Campinas International, Brazil	Clay	(Argentina) Camilo Ugo Carabelli	3–6, 6–4, 6–4
Loss	9–6	Nov 2023	Uruguay Open, Uruguay	Clay	(Argentina) Facundo Díaz Acosta	3–6, 3–5 ret.
Loss	9–7	Mar 2025	Santiago Challenger, Chile	Clay	(Colombia) Daniel Elahi Galán	5–7, 3–6
Loss	9–8	Mar 2025	Paraguay Open, Paraguay	Clay	(United States) Emilio Nava	5–7, 3–6
Loss	9–9	Sep 2026	Szczecin Open, Poland	Clay	(Spain) Nikolás Sánchez Izquierdo	6–4, 3–6, 6–7^{(6–8)}

=== Doubles: 2 (2 runner-ups) ===
Legend ATP Challenger (0–2)

Result	W–L	Date	Tournament	Surface	Partner	Opponents	Score
Loss	0–1	Sep 2013	Tetra Pak Tennis Cup, Brazil	Clay	(Brazil) Thiago Alves	(Argentina) Guido Andreozzi (Argentina) Máximo González	4–6, 4–6
Loss	0–2	Nov 2018	Guayaquil Challenger, Ecuador	Clay	(Brazil) Fabrício Neis	(Argentina) Guillermo Durán (Ecuador) Roberto Quiroz	3–6, 2–6

== ITF Tour finals ==
=== Singles: 8 (5 titles, 3 runner-ups) ===
Legend ITF Futures (5–3)	Finals by surface Hard (3–0) Clay (2–3)

Result	W–L	Date	Tournament	Surface	Opponent	Score
Win	1–0	Nov 2011	F38 Salvador, Brazil	Hard	(Brazil) Alexandre Schnitman	7–6^{(7–2)}, 6–4
Win	2–0	May 2012	F11 Bauru, Brazil	Clay	(Brazil) Leonardo Kirche	2–6, 6–2, 7–6^{(8–6)}
Loss	2–1	Aug 2012	F21 São José do Rio Preto, Brazil	Clay	(Brazil) Nicolas Santos	2–6, 2–6
Loss	2–2	Nov 2012	F32 Porto Alegre, Brazil	Clay	(Brazil) Pedro Zerbini	3–6, 2–6
Win	3–2	Apr 2013	F14 Antalya, Turkey	Hard	(Czech Republic) Jan Minář	7–6^{(7–2)}, 6–4
Win	4–2	Apr 2013	F15 Antalya, Turkey	Hard	(Dominican Republic) José Hernández-Fernández	6–3, 7–6^{(7–5)}
Loss	4–3	Jun 2013	F1 Amstelveen, Netherlands	Clay	(United States) Bjorn Fratangelo	6–3, 4–6, 3–6
Win	5–3	Jun 2014	F4 Middelburg, Netherlands	Clay	(Netherlands) Boy Westerhof	6–4, 6–7^{(2–7)}, 7–5

=== Doubles: 4 (2 titles, 2 runner-ups) ===
Legend ITF Futures (2–2)	Finals by surface Hard (1–0) Clay (1–2)

Result	W–L	Date	Tournament	Surface	Partner	Opponents	Score
Win	1–0	Mar 2013	F12 Antalya, Turkey	Hard	(Argentina) Maximiliano Estévez	(Russia) Kirill Dmitriev (Belarus) Yaraslav Shyla	5–7, 6–2, [10–6]
Loss	1–1	Jun 2014	F3 Breda, Netherlands	Clay	(Chile) Jorge Aguilar	(Brazil) Wilson Leite (Sweden) Christian Lindell	3–6, 5–7
Loss	1–2	Dec 2014	F2 Santiago de los Caballeros, Dominican Republic	Clay	(Brazil) Fabiano de Paula	(Peru) Duilio Beretta (Bolivia) Hugo Dellien	6–3, 4–6, [8–10]
Win	2–2	May 2015	F3 Pantiani, Georgia	Clay	(Italy) Marco Bortolotti	(Russia) Ivan Kalinin (Russia) Victor Baluda	7–6^{(9–7)}, 7–5

== Wins over top 10 players ==
- Monteiro's match record against players who were, at the time the match was played, ranked in the top 10.

Season	2016	...	2023	2024	Total
Wins	1		1	3	5

No.	Player	Rank	Tournament	Surface	Rd	Score	Rk
2016
1.	(France) Jo-Wilfried Tsonga	9	Rio Open, Brazil	Clay	1R	6–3, 3–6, 6–4	338
2023
2.	(Denmark) Holger Rune	4	Davis Cup, Hillerød, Denmark	Hard (i)	G1	6–7^{(4–7)}, 7–6^{(7–5)}, 6–2	116
2024
3.	(Spain) Carlos Alcaraz	2	Rio Open, Brazil	Clay	1R	1–1, ret.	117
4.	(Greece) Stefanos Tsitsipas	7	Madrid Open, Spain	Clay	2R	6–4, 6–4	118
5.	(Norway) Casper Ruud	9	Swedish Open, Sweden	Clay	2R	6–3, 6–3	85
