= João Pedro Sorgi =

Brazilian tennis player

- Sorgi training at 2017 Rio Open
- Full name: João Pedro Sorgi
- Country (sports): Brazil
- Born: 18 October 1993 (age 31) Sertãozinho, Brazil
- Height: 1.88 m (6 ft 2 in)
- Turned pro: 2011
- Plays: Right-handed (two handed-backhand)
- Coach: Carlos Albano
- Prize money: $125,641

Singles
- Career record: 1–2 (at ATP Tour level, Grand Slam level, and in Davis Cup)
- Career titles: 0; 1 Future
- Highest ranking: No. 251 (18 September 2017)

Doubles
- Career record: 0–0 (at ATP Tour level, Grand Slam level, and in Davis Cup)
- Career titles: 0; 14 Futures
- Highest ranking: No. 263 (30 September 2013)
- Last updated on: 12 March 2021.

João Pedro Sorgi (born October 18, 1993) is a former Brazilian tennis player. He has a career high ATP singles ranking of No. 251, achieved on 18 September 2017. Sorgi also has a career high ATP doubles ranking of No. 263 achieved on 30 September 2013.

== Career ==
In May 2011, Sorgi reached the semifinals in Trofeo Bonfiglio (a prestigious junior tennis tournament) after defeating top ranked Dominic Thiem in quarterfinals. Sorgi reached the final of ten Futures in singles, but has only one title; he won the Brazil F10 in São José do Rio Preto in October 2013. In doubles, he won 17 titles out of 27 finals, including three consecutive titles in three weeks, doing this two times: Egypt F11, F12, F13 (in June 2013) partnering André Miele and Argentina F5, F6, F7 (in May 2016) partnering Marcelo Zormann.

At Challenger level, he reached two finals in doubles, finishing runner-up in both. In singles, he reached a lone final, losing in straight sets to Tennys Sandgren at the Savannah Challenger.

== National representation ==
=== Davis Cup ===
Sorgi was first nominated to play for Brazil in Davis Cup in February 2018 against Dominican Republic. Sorgi made his debut in Davis Cup against José Hernández-Fernández but lost in 3 sets. He won the deciding rubber of that tie – against Roberto Cid Subervi – in three sets, which allowed the Brazilian team to advance into the second round, against Colombia. Sorgi reentered against Colombia at the deciding rubber of that tie but lost in straight sets to Alejandro González.

Currently, João Sorgi sports a 1–2 record in Davis Cup matches. He has played only singles matches thus far.

All Davis Cup Matches: 1–2 (Singles: 1–2)
2018 Davis Cup Americas Zone Group I
Round	Date	Opponent	Final match score	Location	Surface	Match	Opponent	Rubber Score
1R	February 2–3, 2018	Dominican Republic	3–2	Santo Domingo	Hard	Singles 1	José Hernández-Fernández	6–1, 4–6, 6–7^{(3–7)}
1R	February 2–3, 2018	Dominican Republic	3–2	Santo Domingo	Hard	Singles 5	Roberto Cid Subervi	6–7^{(6–8)}, 6–1, 6–4
2R	April 6–7, 2018	Colombia	2–3	Barranquilla	Hard	Singles 5	Alejandro González	3–6, 6–7^{(0–7)}

== Challenger and Futures finals ==
=== Singles: 11 (1–10) ===
Legend
ATP Challenger Tour (0–1)
ITF Futures (1–9)

Result	W–L	Date	Tournament	Tier	Surface	Opponent	Score
Loss	0–1	Nov 2011	Foz do Iguaçu, Brazil F40	Futures	Clay	(Brazil) André Ghem	3–6, 2–6
Loss	0–2	May 2012	Manaus, Brazil F10	Futures	Clay (i)	(Brazil) Fernando Romboli	3–6, 4–6
Win	1–2	Sep 2013	São José do Rio Preto, Brazil F10	Futures	Clay	(Brazil) José Pereira	6–3, 5–7, 7–6^{(7–4)}
Loss	1–3	Aug 2014	Misiones, Argentina F13	Futures	Clay	(Argentina) Nicolás Kicker	1–6, 2–6
Loss	1–4	Jul 2015	Belgrade, Serbia F5	Futures	Clay	(France) Maxime Janvier	1–6, 4–6
Loss	1–5	Sep 2015	Santa Fe, Argentina F12	Futures	Clay	(Argentina) Matias Zukas	6–3, 1–6, 3–6
Loss	1–6	May 2016	Villa María, Argentina F5	Futures	Clay	(Argentina) Juan Ignacio Galarza	6–7^{(3–7)}, 5–7
Loss	1–7	Jun 2016	Bergamo, Italy F14	Futures	Clay	(Italy) Adelchi Virgili	3–6, 4–6
Loss	1–8	Dec 2016	Punta del Este, Uruguay F1	Futures	Clay	(Brazil) Orlando Luz	6–4, 2–6, 2–6
Loss	1–9	Dec 2016	Salto, Uruguay F3	Futures	Clay	(Austria) Michael Linzer	3–6, 0–6
Loss	1–10	May 2017	Savannah Challenger, United States	Challenger	Clay	(United States) Tennys Sandgren	4–6, 3–6

=== Doubles: 27 (17–10) ===
Legend
ATP Challenger Tour (0–2)
ITF Futures (17–8)

Result	W–L	Date	Tournament	Tier	Surface	Partner	Opponent	Score
Loss	0–1	Sep 2011	Tetra Pak Tennis Cup, Brazil	Challenger	Clay	(Brazil) Fabrício Neis	(Uruguay) Marcel Felder (Brazil) Caio Zampieri	5–7, 4–6
Loss	0–2	Nov 2011	Juiz de Fora, Brazil F39	Futures	Clay	(Brazil) Gabriel V. Pereira	(Brazil) Clayton Almeida (United States) Joshua Zavala	7–6^{(7–4)}, 6–7^{(2–7)}, [10–12]
Loss	0–3	Feb 2012	Lages, Brazil F7	Futures	Clay	(Brazil) Victor Maynard	(Uruguay) Martín Cuevas (Brazil) Fabrício Neis	3–6, 3–6
Loss	0–4	Apr 2012	IS Open de Tênis, Brazil	Challenger	Clay	(Brazil) André Ghem	(Peru) Paul Capdeville (Uruguay) Marcel Felder	5–7, 3–6
Win	1–4	Aug 2012	Lorena, Brazil F20	Futures	Clay	(Brazil) José Pereira	(Brazil) Caio Silva (Brazil) Thales Turini	3–6, 6–4, [10–8]
Win	2–4	Aug 2012	São Paulo, Brazil F22	Futures	Clay	(Brazil) Fabiano de Paula	(Brazil) Rodrigo-Antonio Grilli (Brazil) André Miele	6–2, 6–4
Loss	2–5	Sep 2012	Belém, Brazil F27	Futures	Hard	(Brazil) Nicolas Santos	(Brazil) Guilherme Clezar (Brazil) Fabrício Neis	0–6, 6–7^{(6–8)}
Loss	2–6	Jun 2013	Sharm El Sheikh, Egypt F10	Futures	Clay	(Brazil) André Miele	(Belgium) Joris De Loore (Belgium) Jeroen Vanneste	4–6, 4–6
Win	3–6	Jun 2013	Sharm El Sheikh, Egypt F11	Futures	Clay	(Brazil) André Miele	(Russia) Evgeny Elistratov (Russia) Andrey Saveliev	6–3, 6–3
Win	4–6	Jun 2013	Sharm El Sheikh, Egypt F12	Futures	Clay	(Brazil) André Miele	(Norway) Oystein Steiro (New Zealand) Ryoma Sloane	6–4, 6–4
Win	5–6	Jun 2013	Sharm El Sheikh, Egypt F13	Futures	Clay	(Brazil) André Miele	(Italy) Omar Giacalone (Italy) Francesco Garzelli	6–2, 2–6, [10–3]
Win	6–6	Aug 2013	Natal, Brazil F5	Futures	Clay	(Brazil) André Miele	(Brazil) Eduardo Dischinger (Brazil) Bruno Sant'Anna	6–4, 6–2
Win	7–6	Aug 2013	Campos do Jordão, Brazil F6	Futures	Hard	(Brazil) André Miele	(Brazil) José Pereira (Brazil) Alexandre Tsuchiya	6–4, 6–4
Win	8–6	Sep 2013	Caxias do Sul, Brazil F8	Futures	Clay	(Brazil) Fabrício Neis	(Brazil) João Menezes (Brazil) Evaldo Neto	6–3, 3–6, [10–6]
Loss	8–7	Sep 2013	São José do Rio Preto, Brazil F8	Futures	Clay	(Brazil) Pedro Sakamoto	(Brazil) André Miele (Brazil) Alexandre Tsuchiya	3–6, 7–6^{(7–3)}, [6–10]
Loss	8–8	Mar 2015	Guaymallén, Argentina F1	Futures	Clay	(Switzerland) Jacob Kahoun	(Argentina) Nicolás Kicker (Argentina) Mateo N. Martínez	4–6, 7–6^{(7–5)}, [7–10]
Win	9–8	May 2015	Pereira, Colombia F2	Futures	Clay	(Brazil) Wilson Leite	(Brazil) Fernando Romboli (Brazil) Caio Zampieri	1–6, 6–1, [10–8]
Win	10–8	May 2015	Pereira, Colombia F3	Futures	Clay	(Brazil) Wilson Leite	(Colombia) Felipe Mantilla (Colombia) Juan Montes	6–4, 6–4
Win	11–8	Aug 2015	São José do Rio Preto, Brazil F5	Futures	Clay	(Brazil) Fabrício Neis	(Brazil) André Miele (Brazil) Alexandre Tsuchiya	3–6, 6–4, [12–10]
Loss	11–9	Sep 2015	Buenos Aires, Argentina F11	Futures	Clay	(Argentina) Sebastian E. Pini	(Argentina) Alan Kohen (Argentina) Mariano Kelstelbolm	5–7, 4–6
Win	12–9	May 2016	Villa María, Argentina F5	Futures	Clay	(Brazil) Marcelo Zormann	(Argentina) Mariano Kelstelbolm (Argentina) Matias Zukas	6–2, 3–6, [10–2]
Win	13–9	May 2016	Villa del Dique, Argentina F6	Futures	Clay	(Brazil) Marcelo Zormann	(Brazil) Oscar José Gutierrez (Argentina) Gabriel A. Hidalgo	6–2, 6–3
Win	14–9	May 2016	Córdoba, Argentina F7	Futures	Clay	(Brazil) Marcelo Zormann	(Chile) Guillermo Aránguiz (Chile) Juan Carlos Sáez	6–4, 3–6, [11–9]
Loss	14–10	Jun 2016	Bergamo, Italy F14	Futures	Clay	(Argentina) Mateo N. Martínez	(Germany) Jakob Sude (Italy) Matteo Volante	6–2, 1–6, [4–10]
Win	15–10	Dec 2017	Lima, Peru F1	Futures	Clay	(Colombia) Daniel Elahi Galán	(Bolivia) Boris Arias (Bolivia) Federico Zeballos	4–6, 6–4, [10–3]
Win	16–10	Mar 2019	Tabarka, Tunisia M15	Futures	Clay	(Argentina) Mariano Kestelboim	(Spain) Imanol Lope Morillo (Spain) Pol Toledo Bagué	w/o
Win	17–10	Jul 2019	Lima, Peru M25	Futures	Clay	(Argentina) Camilo Ugo Carabelli	(Peru) Arklon Huertas del Pino (Peru) Conner Huertas del Pino	w/o
