= Campeonato Internacional de Tênis de Campinas =

Tennis tournament held in Campinas, Brazil

Campeonato Internacional de Tênis
- 2025 Campeonato Internacional de Tênis de Campinas

ATP Challenger Tour
- Location: Campinas; Brazil
- Venue: Sociedade Hípica de Campinas
- Category: ATP Challenger Tour (-2022, 2025-), Challenger Tour 100 (2023-2024)
- Surface: Clay / Outdoors
- Draw: 32S/32Q/16D
- Prize money: $100,000 (2025), $133,250 (2024)
- Website: Website

The Campeonato Internacional de Tênis (formerly known as Tetra Pak Tennis Cup) is a tennis tournament held in Campinas, Brazil, since 2011. The event is part of the ATP Challenger Tour and is played on outdoor clay courts at the Sociedade Hípica de Campinas, hosting the longest-running Challenger event in Brazil.

== Past finals ==
=== Singles ===
Year	Champion	Runner-up	Score
2026	(Brazil) Gustavo Heide	(Peru) Gonzalo Bueno	6–2, 7–5
2025	(Chile) Tomás Barrios Vera	(Ecuador) Álvaro Guillén Meza	6–4, 6–3
2024	(United States) Tristan Boyer	(Argentina) Juan Pablo Ficovich	6–2, 3–6, 6–3
2023	(Brazil) Thiago Monteiro	(Argentina) Camilo Ugo Carabelli	3–6, 6–4, 6–4
2022	(United Kingdom) Jan Choinski	(Peru) Juan Pablo Varillas	6–4, 6–4
2021	(Argentina) Sebastián Báez	(Brazil) Thiago Monteiro	6–1, 6–4
2020	(Argentina) Francisco Cerúndolo	(Spain) Roberto Carballés Baena	6–4, 3–6, 6–3
2019	(Peru) Juan Pablo Varillas	(Argentina) Juan Pablo Ficovich	2–6, 7–6^{(7–4)}, 6–2
2018	(Chile) Cristian Garín	(Argentina) Federico Delbonis	6–3, 6–4
2017	Held as São Paulo Challenger de Tênis		
2016	(Argentina) Facundo Bagnis	(Argentina) Carlos Berlocq	5–7, 6–2, 3–0 ret.
2015	(Argentina) Facundo Argüello	(Argentina) Diego Schwartzman	7–5, 6–3
2014	(Argentina) Diego Schwartzman	(Brazil) André Ghem	4–6, 6–4, 7–5
2013	(Brazil) Guilherme Clezar	(Argentina) Facundo Bagnis	6–4, 6–4
2012	(Argentina) Guido Pella	(Brazil) Leonardo Kirche	6–4, 6–0
2011	(Argentina) Máximo González	(Brazil) Caio Zampieri	6–3, 6–2

=== Doubles ===
Year	Champions	Runners-up	Score
2026	(Spain) Nicolás Álvarez Varona (Spain) Mario Mansilla Díez	(Argentina) Mariano Kestelboim (Brazil) Marcelo Zormann	3–6, 6–1, [10–8]
2025	(Argentina) Mariano Kestelboim (Argentina) Gonzalo Villanueva	(Japan) Seita Watanabe (Japan) Takeru Yuzuki	6–2, 7–6^{(7–5)}
2024	(Brazil) Mateus Alves (Brazil) Orlando Luz	(Chile) Tomás Barrios Vera (Argentina) Facundo Mena	6–3, 6–4
2023	(Argentina) Guido Andreozzi (Argentina) Guillermo Durán	(Ecuador) Diego Hidalgo (Colombia) Cristian Rodríguez	7–6^{(7–4)}, 6–3
2022	(Bolivia) Boris Arias (Bolivia) Federico Zeballos	(Argentina) Guido Andreozzi (Argentina) Guillermo Durán	7–5, 6–2
2021	(Brazil) Rafael Matos (Brazil) Felipe Meligeni Alves	(Brazil) Gilbert Klier Júnior (Brazil) Matheus Pucinelli de Almeida	6–3, 6–1
2020	(France) Sadio Doumbia (France) Fabien Reboul	(Venezuela) Luis David Martínez (Brazil) Felipe Meligeni Alves	6–7^{(7–9)}, 7–5, [10–7]
2019	(Brazil) Orlando Luz (Brazil) Rafael Matos	(Mexico) Miguel Ángel Reyes-Varela (Brazil) Fernando Romboli	6–7^{(2–7)}, 6–4, [10–8]
2018	(Bolivia) Hugo Dellien (Argentina) Guillermo Durán	(Argentina) Franco Agamenone (Brazil) Fernando Romboli	7–5, 6–4
2017	Held as São Paulo Challenger de Tênis		
2016	(Argentina) Federico Coria (Argentina) Tomás Lipovšek Puches	(Peru) Sergio Galdós (Argentina) Máximo González	6–7^{(4–7)}, 6–4, [10–2]
2015	(Argentina) Andrés Molteni (Chile) Hans Podlipnik	(Brazil) Guilherme Clezar (Brazil) Fabrício Neis	3–6, 6–2, [10–0]
2014	(Argentina) Facundo Bagnis (Argentina) Diego Schwartzman	(Brazil) André Ghem (Brazil) Fabrício Neis	7–6^{(7–4)}, 5–7, [10–7]
2013	(Argentina) Guido Andreozzi (Argentina) Máximo González	(Brazil) Thiago Alves (Brazil) Thiago Monteiro	6–4, 6–4
2012	(Brazil) Marcelo Demoliner (Brazil) João Souza	(Uruguay) Marcel Felder (Argentina) Máximo González	6–1, 7–5
2011	(Uruguay) Marcel Felder (Brazil) Caio Zampieri	(Brazil) Fabrício Neis (Brazil) João Pedro Sorgi	7–5, 6–4
