= Caio Zampieri =

Brazilian tennis player

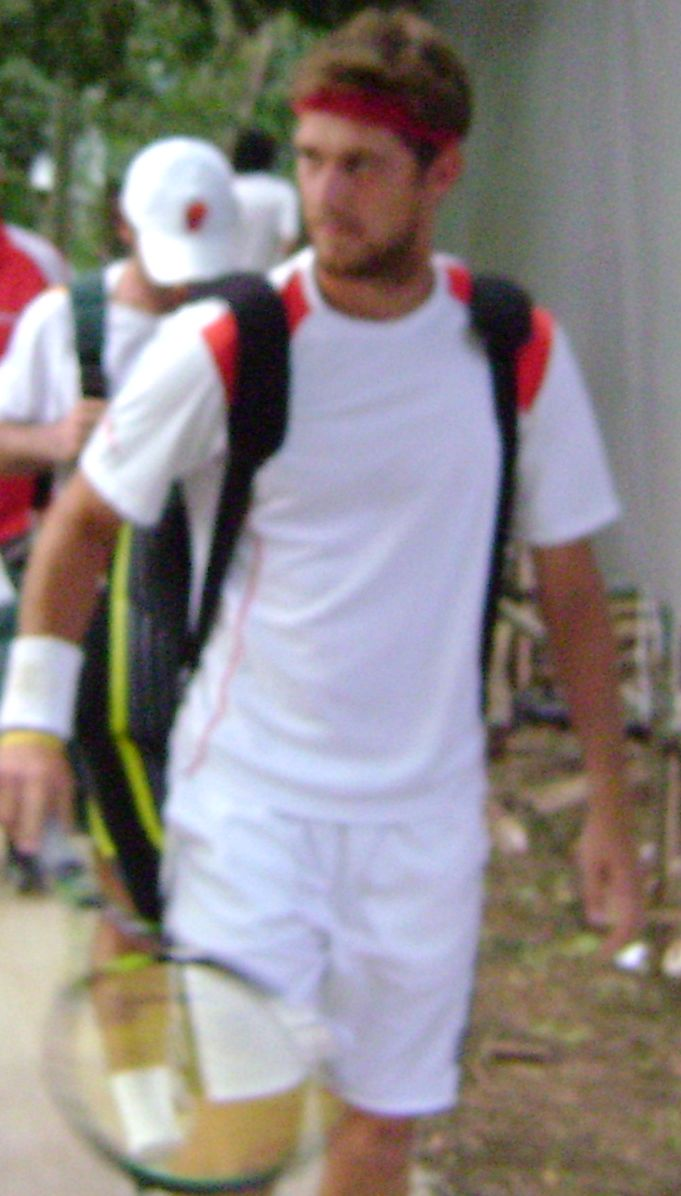
- Country (sports): Brazil
- Residence: São Paulo, Brazil
- Born: May 27, 1986 (age 39) Mogi Guaçu, Brazil
- Turned pro: 2005
- Plays: Right-handed (two-handed backhand)
- Prize money: $292,766

Singles
- Career record: 1–2 (ATP Tour level, Grand Slam level, and Davis Cup)
- Career titles: 0
- Highest ranking: No. 182 (19 July 2010)

Grand Slam singles results
- Australian Open: Q2 (2012)
- French Open: Q1 (2009, 2010)
- Wimbledon: Q3 (2009)
- US Open: Q2 (2008, 2010)

Doubles
- Career record: 0–1 (ATP Tour level, Grand Slam level, and Davis Cup)
- Career titles: 0
- Highest ranking: No. 114 (17 April 2017)

Caio Cesar Cardoso Zampieri (born May 27, 1986, in Mogi Guaçu, Brazil) is a Brazilian professional tennis player.

== Challenger finals ==
=== Singles: 0 (0–1) ===
Legend
ATP Challenger Tour (0–1)

Result	Date	Tournament	Surface	Opponent	Score
Runner-up	1 October 2016	Medellín, Colombia	Clay	(Argentina) Facundo Bagnis	6–7^{(3–7)}, 7–5, 6–2

== Futures titles ==
=== Titles Singles: (8) ===
Legend
ITF Futures Series (8)

No.	Date	Tournament	Surface	Opponent	Score
1.	09.05.2005	Brazil F3, Brazil	Clay	(Brazil) Felipe Lemos	7–6^{(7–2)}, 6–4
2.	16.10.2006	Brazil F15, Brazil	Clay	(Brazil) Rafael Camilo	6–3, 6–2
3.	13.11.2006	Brazil F19, Brazil	Clay	(Italy) Mattia Livraghi	6–3, 6–4, 6–3
4.	4.12.2006	Brazil F22, Brazil	Clay	(Venezuela) Jhonnatan Medina-Álvarez	6–2, 3–6, 6–4
5.	14.05.2007	Brazil F4, Brazil	Clay	(Brazil) Alexandre Bonatto	7–6^{(7–4)}, 6–3
6.	17.09.2007	Brazil F14, Brazil	Clay	(Brazil) Franco Ferreiro	0–6, 6–3, 3–0 RET
7.	13.10.2008	Brazil F24, Brazil	Clay	(United States) Eric Nunez	0–6, 7–6^{(9–7)}, 7–5
8.	21.12.2009	Brazil F32, Brazil	Clay	(Brazil) Eládio Ribeiro Neto	4–6, 6–1, 6–3
