= Fabiano de Paula =

Brazilian tennis player

- Full name: Fabiano Batista de Paula
- Country (sports): Brazil
- Residence: Rio de Janeiro, Brazil
- Born: 28 November 1988 (age 37) Rio de Janeiro, Brazil
- Height: 1.78 m (5 ft 10 in)
- Turned pro: 2006
- Plays: Right-handed (one-handed backhand)
- Prize money: US$ 176,902

Singles
- Career record: 0–1 (ATP Tour and Grand Slams, and in Davis Cup)
- Career titles: 0
- Highest ranking: No. 208 (23 February 2015)

Grand Slam singles results
- Australian Open: Q1 (2013, 2015)
- Wimbledon: Q1 (2013)
- US Open: Q1 (2013)

Doubles
- Career record: 0–1 (ATP Tour and Grand Slams, and in Davis Cup)
- Career titles: 0
- Highest ranking: No. 128 (23 October 2017)

Grand Slam doubles results
- Australian Open: A
- French Open: A
- Wimbledon: A
- US Open: A

Fabiano Batista de Paula (Brazilian Portuguese: [faˈbjɐnu dʒi ˈpawlɐ]; born 28 November 1988 in Rio de Janeiro) is a Brazilian professional tennis player competing mainly on the ATP Challenger Tour both in singles and doubles.

de Paula reached his highest ATP singles ranking, No. 208 on 23 February 2015 and his highest ATP doubles ranking No. 256 on 5 November 2012.

== ATP career finals (2) ==
=== Doubles (2) ===
Legend
ATP Challengers (2)

Finals by surface
Hard (0–0)
Clay (2–0)
Grass (0–0)
Carpet (0–0)

Outcome	No.	Date	Tournament	Surface	Partnering	Opponent in the final	Score
Winner	1.	10 November 2012	São Leopoldo, Brazil	Clay	(Brazil) Júlio Silva	(Uruguay) Ariel Behar (Argentina) Horacio Zeballos	6–1, 7–6^{(7–5)}
Winner	2.	16 June 2014	Mohammedia, Morocco	Clay	(Egypt) Mohamed Safwat	(Germany) Richard Becker (France) Elie Rousset	6–2, 3–6, [10–6]
