= 2022 Cali Open – Singles =

Singles
- 2022 Cali Open

Final
- Champion: (Argentina) Facundo Mena
- Runner-up: (Serbia) Miljan Zekić
- Score: 6–2, 7–6^{(7–3)}

Events
| Singles | Doubles |
- Cali Open

This was the first edition of the tournament. The tournament originated as a quick replacement for the 2022 edition of the Quito Challenger, which was moved to Cali due to political unrest in Quito.

Facundo Mena won the title after defeating Miljan Zekić 6–2, 7–6^{(7–3)} in the final.

== Seeds ==
1. (Chile) Tomás Barrios Vera (second round)
2. (Argentina) Facundo Mena (champion)
3. (Argentina) Juan Pablo Ficovich (second round)
4. (Brazil) Felipe Meligeni Alves (quarterfinals)
5. (Argentina) Francisco Comesaña (first round, retired)
6. (Austria) Gerald Melzer (second round)
7. (Chile) Gonzalo Lama (first round)
8. (Serbia) Miljan Zekić (final)

== Draw ==
Key

- Q = Qualifier
- WC = Wild card
- LL = Lucky loser
- Alt = Alternate
- ITF = ITF entry
- PR = Protected ranking
- SR = Special ranking
- SE = Special exempt
- JE = Junior exempt
- JR = Junior Accelerator Programme entrant
- CO = College Accelerator Programme entrant
- NG = Next Gen Accelerator Program entrant
- w/o = Walkover
- r = Retired
- d = Defaulted

=== Finals ===
Semifinals
8 | (Serbia) Miljan Zekić | 7 | 6
(Colombia) Nicolás Mejía | 5 | 4
(Peru) Nicolás Álvarez | 6^{6} | 4
2 | (Argentina) Facundo Mena | 7^{8} | 6

Final
8 | (Serbia) Miljan Zekić | 2 | 6^{3}
2 | (Argentina) Facundo Mena | 6 | 7^{7}

=== Top half ===
First round
1/WC | (Chile) T Barrios Vera | 6 | 7^{7}
Alt | (Greece) M Pervolarakis | 2 | 6^{3}
Q | (Argentina) RA Burruchaga | 6 | 6
(Argentina) G Villanueva | 1 | 1
(Serbia) P Krstin | 6 | 6
Q | (United States) N Chappell | 2 | 4
(United States) A Kovacevic | 6 | 4 | 1
8 | (Serbia) M Zekić | 1 | 6 | 6
3 | (Argentina) JP Ficovich | 6 | 6
WC | (Colombia) A Urrea | 3 | 1
Alt | (United States) E Zhu | 2 | 2
(Colombia) N Mejía | 6 | 6
Q | (Argentina) Matías Zukas | 6 | 6
(United States) K Smith | 4 | 2
(Brazil) J Menezes | 6 | 6
7 | (Chile) G Lama | 4 | 2

Second round
1/WC | (Chile) T Barrios Vera | 6 | 2 | 1
Q | (Argentina) RA Burruchaga | 4 | 6 | 6
(Serbia) P Krstin | 6 | 6^{8} | 5
8 | (Serbia) M Zekić | 4 | 7^{10} | 7
3 | (Argentina) JP Ficovich | 6^{4} | 4
(Colombia) N Mejía | 7^{7} | 6
Q | (Argentina) M Zukas | 2 | 6 | 6
(Brazil) J Menezes | 6 | 4 | 2

Quarterfinals
Q | (Argentina) RA Burruchaga | 5 | 2
8 | (Serbia) M Zekić | 7 | 6
(Colombia) N Mejía | 6 | 6
Q | (Argentina) M Zukas | 1 | 4

Semifinals
8 | (Serbia) M Zekić | 7 | 6
(Colombia) N Mejía | 5 | 4

=== Bottom half ===
First round
5 | (Argentina) F Comesaña | 5 | 0^{r}
(Ecuador) R Quiroz | 7 | 0
(Peru) N Álvarez | 7 | 7^{7}
(Spain) A Menéndez Maceiras | 5 | 6^{3}
Q | (Argentina) Juan Bautista Otegui | 6 | 7^{9}
(Norway) V Durasovic | 3 | 6^{7}
(Tunisia) M Jaziri | 4 | 0^{r}
4 | (Brazil) F Meligeni Alves | 6 | 4
6 | (Austria) G Melzer | 6 | 6
WC | (Colombia) Mateo Gómez | 0 | 0
Q | (South Korea) Y-s Chung | 6 | 6
Q | (Brazil) M Alves | 4 | 0
(Dominican Republic) N Hardt | 6 | 6^{5} | 3
(Argentina) Facundo Juárez | 4 | 7^{7} | 6
(Portugal) G Oliveira | 4 | 4
2 | (Argentina) F Mena | 6 | 6

Second round
(Ecuador) R Quiroz | 6 | 3 | 3
(Peru) N Álvarez | 4 | 6 | 6
Q | (Argentina) JB Otegui | 6 | 4 | 6^{2}
4 | (Brazil) F Meligeni Alves | 2 | 6 | 7^{7}
6 | (Austria) G Melzer | 4 | 2
Q | (South Korea) Y-s Chung | 6 | 6
(Argentina) F Juárez | 4 | 0
2 | (Argentina) F Mena | 6 | 6

Quarterfinals
(Peru) N Álvarez | 6^{4} | 6 | 7^{9}
4 | (Brazil) F Meligeni Alves | 7^{7} | 4 | 6^{7}
Q | (South Korea) Y-s Chung | 3 | 7 | 6^{4}
2 | (Argentina) F Mena | 6 | 5 | 7^{7}

Semifinals
(Peru) N Álvarez | 6^{6} | 4
2 | (Argentina) F Mena | 7^{8} | 6
