= 2022 Cali Open =

- Date: 27 June – 2 July
- Edition: 1st
- Surface: Clay
- Location: Cali, Colombia

Champions

Singles
- (Argentina) Facundo Mena

Doubles
- (Tunisia) Malek Jaziri / (Spain) Adrián Menéndez Maceiras
| Cali Open | · 2023 → |

The 2022 Cali Open was a professional tennis tournament played on clay courts. It was the first edition of the tournament which was part of the 2022 ATP Challenger Tour. It took place in Cali, Colombia between 27 June and 2 July 2022.

== Singles main draw entrants ==
=== Seeds ===
| Country | Player | Rank^{1} | Seed |
|---|---|---|---|
| CHI | Tomás Barrios Vera | 131 | 1 |
| ARG | Facundo Mena | 162 | 2 |
| ARG | Juan Pablo Ficovich | 168 | 3 |
| BRA | Felipe Meligeni Alves | 213 | 4 |
| ARG | Francisco Comesaña | 239 | 5 |
| AUT | Gerald Melzer | 245 | 6 |
| CHI | Gonzalo Lama | 250 | 7 |
| SRB | Miljan Zekić | 271 | 8 |

- ^{1} Rankings as of 20 June 2022.

=== Other entrants ===
The following players received wildcards into the singles main draw:

- (Chile) Tomás Barrios Vera
- (Colombia) Mateo Gómez
- (Colombia) Andrés Urrea

The following players received entry into the singles main draw as alternates:

- (Greece) Michail Pervolarakis
- (United States) Evan Zhu

The following players received entry from the qualifying draw:

- (Brazil) Mateus Alves
- (Argentina) Román Andrés Burruchaga
- (United States) Nick Chappell
- (South Korea) Chung Yun-seong
- (Argentina) Juan Bautista Otegui
- (Argentina) Matías Zukas

== Champions ==
=== Singles ===
- (Argentina) Facundo Mena def. (Serbia) Miljan Zekić 6–2, 7–6^{(7–3)}.

=== Doubles ===
- (Tunisia) Malek Jaziri / (Spain) Adrián Menéndez Maceiras def. (United States) Keegan Smith / (United States) Evan Zhu 7–5, 6–4.
