= 2024 Cali Open – Doubles =

Doubles
- 2024 Cali Open

Final
- Champions: (Canada) Juan Carlos Aguilar (Peru) Conner Huertas del Pino
- Runners-up: (Colombia) Juan Sebastián Gómez (Colombia) Johan Alexander Rodríguez
- Score: 5–7, 6–3, [10–7]

Events
| Singles | Doubles |
| ← 2023 · | Cali Open | · 2025 → |

Guido Andreozzi and Cristian Rodríguez were the defending champions but chose not to defend their title.

Juan Carlos Aguilar and Conner Huertas del Pino won the title after defeating Juan Sebastián Gómez and Johan Alexander Rodríguez 5–7, 6–3, [10–7] in the final.

== Seeds ==
1. (Bolivia) Boris Arias / (Bolivia) Federico Zeballos (semifinals)
2. (Brazil) Orlando Luz / (Argentina) Santiago Rodríguez Taverna (semifinals)
3. (United Kingdom) Scott Duncan / (United States) Hunter Reese (first round)
4. (Brazil) Mateus Alves / (Brazil) Daniel Dutra da Silva (quarterfinals)

== Draw ==
=== Key ===
- Q = Qualifier
- WC = Wild card
- LL = Lucky loser
- Alt = Alternate
- SE = Special exempt
- PR = Protected ranking
- ITF = ITF entry
- JE = Junior exempt
- w/o = Walkover
- r = Retired
- d = Defaulted
- SR = Special ranking

=== Draw ===
First round
1 | (Bolivia) B Arias (Bolivia) F Zeballos | 6 | 6^{6} | [10]
(Bolivia) M Dellien (Bolivia) JC Prado Ángelo | 4 | 7^{8} | [7]
(Peru) G Bueno (Ecuador) Á Guillén Meza | 3 | 7 | [10]
Alt | (Brazil) Wilson Leite (Brazil) J Pereira | 6 | 5 | [7]
4 | (Brazil) M Alves (Brazil) D Dutra da Silva | 6 | 6
(France) E Couacaud (Argentina) R Olivo | 3 | 4
(Canada) JC Aguilar (Peru) C Huertas del Pino | 6 | 6
(Argentina) A Collarini (Argentina) G Villanueva | 3 | 4
WC | (Colombia) Alejandro Arcila (Colombia) Samuel Heredia | 7^{8} | 6
(Uruguay) I Carou (Argentina) F Mena | 6^{6} | 3
WC | (Colombia) JS Gómez (Colombia) Johan Alexander Rodríguez | 2 | 6 | [10]
3 | (United Kingdom) S Duncan (United States) H Reese | 6 | 3 | [2]
(Argentina) Tomás Farjat (Uruguay) F Roncadelli | 3 | 2
(Argentina) Leonardo Aboian (Argentina) V Aboian | 6 | 6
(Brazil) L Britto (Colombia) A Urrea | 4 | 2
2 | (Brazil) O Luz (Argentina) S Rodríguez Taverna | 6 | 6

Quarterfinals
1 | (Bolivia) B Arias (Bolivia) F Zeballos | w/o
(Peru) G Bueno (Ecuador) Á Guillén Meza
4 | (Brazil) M Alves (Brazil) D Dutra da Silva | 6 | 3 | [8]
(Canada) JC Aguilar (Peru) C Huertas del Pino | 3 | 6 | [10]
WC | (Colombia) A Arcila (Colombia) S Heredia | 7^{7} | 1 | [9]
WC | (Colombia) JS Gómez (Colombia) JA Rodríguez | 6^{1} | 6 | [11]
(Argentina) L Aboian (Argentina) V Aboian
2 | (Brazil) O Luz (Argentina) S Rodríguez Taverna | w/o

Semifinals
1 | (Bolivia) B Arias (Bolivia) F Zeballos | 6 | 4 | [8]
(Canada) JC Aguilar (Peru) C Huertas del Pino | 2 | 6 | [10]
WC | (Colombia) JS Gómez (Colombia) JA Rodríguez | 6 | 6
2 | (Brazil) O Luz (Argentina) S Rodríguez Taverna | 2 | 3

Final
(Canada) JC Aguilar (Peru) C Huertas del Pino | 5 | 6 | [10]
WC | (Colombia) JS Gómez (Colombia) JA Rodríguez | 7 | 3 | [7]
