= 2026 Cali Open – Singles =

Singles
- 2026 Cali Open

Final
- Champion: (Brazil) Matheus Pucinelli de Almeida
- Runner-up: (Argentina) Valerio Aboian
- Score: 7–6^{(7–1)}, 6–3

Events
Singles	Doubles
- Cali Open

Tomás Barrios Vera was the defending champion but lost in the first round to Nicolas Jarry.

Matheus Pucinelli de Almeida won the title after defeating Valerio Aboian 7–6^{(7–1)}, 6–3 in the final.

== Seeds ==
1. (Brazil) Gustavo Heide (semifinals)
2. (Colombia) Nicolás Mejía (second round)
3. (Argentina) Francisco Comesaña (second round, retired)
4. (Bolivia) Hugo Dellien (first round, retired)
5. (Chile) Tomás Barrios Vera (first round)
6. (Brazil) Thiago Seyboth Wild (withdrew)
7. (Peru) Gonzalo Bueno (second round)
8. (Argentina) Facundo Mena (first round)

== Draw ==
Key

- Q = Qualifier
- WC = Wild card
- LL = Lucky loser
- Alt = Alternate
- ITF = ITF entry
- PR = Protected ranking
- SR = Special ranking
- SE = Special exempt
- JE = Junior exempt
- JR = Junior Accelerator Programme entrant
- CO = College Accelerator Programme entrant
- NG = Next Gen Accelerator Program entrant
- w/o = Walkover
- r = Retired
- d = Defaulted

=== Finals ===
Semifinals
1	(Brazil) Gustavo Heide	3	5
(Brazil) Matheus Pucinelli de Almeida	6	7
Q	(Brazil) Felipe Meligeni Alves	6	3	5
(Argentina) Valerio Aboian	3	6	7

Final
(Brazil) Matheus Pucinelli de Almeida	7^{7}	6
(Argentina) Valerio Aboian	6^{1}	3

=== Top half ===
First round
1	(Brazil) G Heide	6	3	6
LL	(Mexico) A Hernández	4	6	3
(Colombia) DE Galán	3	3
(Peru) JP Varillas	6	6
(Mexico) R Pacheco Méndez	6^{6}	7^{8}	6^{4}
Q	(Argentina) S Rodríguez Taverna	7^{8}	6^{6}	7^{7}
(Argentina) H Casanova	6	3	2
7	(Peru) G Bueno	2	6	6
4	(Bolivia) H Dellien	3	0^{r}
(Argentina) JM La Serna	6	2
Q	(Colombia) Daniel Salazar	3	1
(Argentina) JB Torres	6	6
Q	(Brazil) J Pereira	4	5
(Brazil) M Pucinelli de Almeida	6	7
WC	(Chile) N Jarry	6	6^{3}	6
5	(Chile) T Barrios Vera	4	7^{7}	2

Second round
1	(Brazil) G Heide	7	6
(Peru) JP Varillas	5	4
Q	(Argentina) S Rodríguez Taverna	6^{12}	6	6
7	(Peru) G Bueno	7^{14}	4	2
(Argentina) JM La Serna	6	6
(Argentina) JB Torres	4	2
(Brazil) M Pucinelli de Almeida	7^{7}	6
WC	(Chile) N Jarry	6^{5}	4

Quarterfinals
1	(Brazil) G Heide	6	6
Q	(Argentina) S Rodríguez Taverna	3	4
(Argentina) JM La Serna	4	6	5
(Brazil) M Pucinelli de Almeida	6	4	7

Semifinals
1	(Brazil) G Heide	3	5
(Brazil) M Pucinelli de Almeida	6	7

=== Bottom half ===
First round
Q	(Germany) D Dedura	6	6
(Argentina) N Kicker	4	4
(Argentina) JP Ficovich	2	4
Q	(Brazil) F Meligeni Alves	6	6
(Argentina) Carlos María Zárate	6	6
Q	(Argentina) F Ribero	1	3
(Dominican Republic) N Hardt	3	5
3	(Argentina) F Comesaña	6	7
8	(Argentina) F Mena	6	3	4
(Argentina) V Aboian	2	6	6
(Chile) M Soto	7^{10}	4	6
WC	(Colombia) Samuel Heredia	6^{8}	6	2
(Argentina) G Villanueva	1	6	4
WC	(Colombia) Miguel Tobón	6	2	6
PR	(Argentina) F Coria	6^{4}	4
2	(Colombia) N Mejía	7^{7}	6

Second round
Q	(Germany) D Dedura	4	2
Q	(Brazil) F Meligeni Alves	6	6
(Argentina) CM Zárate	2	7^{7}	0
3	(Argentina) F Comesaña	6	6^{5}	0^{r}
(Argentina) V Aboian	6	6
(Chile) M Soto	2	2
WC	(Colombia) M Tobón	4	6	7^{7}
2	(Colombia) N Mejía	6	2	6^{1}

Quarterfinals
Q	(Brazil) F Meligeni Alves	6	3	7
(Argentina) CM Zárate	2	6	5
(Argentina) V Aboian	1	7^{7}	6
WC	(Colombia) M Tobón	6	6^{2}	2

Semifinals
Q	(Brazil) F Meligeni Alves	6	3	5
(Argentina) V Aboian	3	6	7
