= 2022 Salvador Challenger – Doubles =

Doubles
- 2022 Salvador Challenger

Final
- Champions: (Ecuador) Diego Hidalgo (Colombia) Cristian Rodríguez
- Runners-up: (Brazil) Orlando Luz (Brazil) Felipe Meligeni Alves
- Score: 7–5, 6–1

Events
Singles	Doubles
- Salvador Challenger

This was the first edition of the tournament and was part of the 2022 Legión Sudamericana.

Diego Hidalgo and Cristian Rodríguez won the title after defeating Orlando Luz and Felipe Meligeni Alves 7–5, 6–1 in the final.

== Seeds ==
1. (Brazil) Orlando Luz / (Brazil) Felipe Meligeni Alves (final)
2. (Ecuador) Diego Hidalgo / (Colombia) Cristian Rodríguez (champions)
3. (Chile) Tomás Barrios Vera / (Venezuela) Luis David Martínez (semifinals)
4. (Argentina) Hernán Casanova / (Argentina) Santiago Rodríguez Taverna (semifinals)

== Draw ==
Key

- Q = Qualifier
- WC = Wild card
- LL = Lucky loser
- Alt = Alternate
- ITF = ITF entry
- PR = Protected ranking
- SR = Special ranking
- SE = Special exempt
- JE = Junior exempt
- JR = Junior Accelerator Programme entrant
- CO = College Accelerator Programme entrant
- NG = Next Gen Accelerator Program entrant
- w/o = Walkover
- r = Retired
- d = Defaulted

First round
1	(Brazil) O Luz (Brazil) F Meligeni Alves	6	6
(Peru) N Álvarez (Argentina) F Comesaña	2	4
WC	(Brazil) JVC Loureiro (Brazil) E Ribeiro	w/o
(Argentina) AL Lingua Lavallén (Argentina) JB Torres
3	(Chile) T Barrios Vera (Venezuela) LD Martínez	7	6
(Peru) C Huertas del Pino (Peru) A Merino	5	2
(Bulgaria) A Andreev (Peru) J Panta	6	2
(Brazil) P Boscardin Dias (Brazil) G Heide	3	1^{r}
(Brazil) D Dutra da Silva (Brazil) Gilbert Klier Júnior	4	7^{7}	[9]
(Dominican Republic) N Hardt (Argentina) Matías Zukas	6	6^{4}	[11]
(Argentina) MF Descotte (Argentina) G Villanueva	4	6^{4}
4	(Argentina) H Casanova (Argentina) S Rodríguez Taverna	6	7^{7}
WC	(Brazil) Wilson Leite (Brazil) JL Reis da Silva	6	6
(Ecuador) C March (Spain) P Martín Tiffon	3	0
(Argentina) Facundo Juárez (Slovenia) T Lipovšek Puches	4	3
2	(Ecuador) D Hidalgo (Colombia) C Rodríguez	6	6

Quarterfinals
1	(Brazil) O Luz (Brazil) F Meligeni Alves	6	6
WC	(Brazil) JVC Loureiro (Brazil) E Ribeiro	3	4
3	(Chile) T Barrios Vera (Venezuela) LD Martínez	6	6
(Bulgaria) A Andreev (Peru) J Panta	2	4
(Dominican Republic) N Hardt (Argentina) M Zukas	2	5
4	(Argentina) H Casanova (Argentina) S Rodríguez Taverna	6	7
WC	(Brazil) W Leite (Brazil) JL Reis da Silva	2	6^{4}
2	(Ecuador) D Hidalgo (Colombia) C Rodríguez	6	7^{7}

Semifinals
1	(Brazil) O Luz (Brazil) F Meligeni Alves	6	4	[10]
3	(Chile) T Barrios Vera (Venezuela) LD Martínez	3	6	[6]
4	(Argentina) H Casanova (Argentina) S Rodríguez Taverna	5	4
2	(Ecuador) D Hidalgo (Colombia) C Rodríguez	7	6

Final
1	(Brazil) O Luz (Brazil) F Meligeni Alves	5	1
2	(Ecuador) D Hidalgo (Colombia) C Rodríguez	7	6
