= 2026 Cali Open – Doubles =

Doubles
- 2026 Cali Open

Final
- Champions: (Bolivia) Federico Zeballos (Brazil) Marcelo Zormann
- Runners-up: (Mexico) Alan Magadán (Mexico) Rodrigo Pacheco Méndez
- Score: 5–5 ret.

Events
Singles	Doubles
- Cali Open

Federico Agustín Gómez and Luis David Martínez were the defending champions but chose not to defend their title.

Federico Zeballos and Marcelo Zormann won the title after Alan Magadán and Rodrigo Pacheco Méndez retired at 5–5 in the final.

== Seeds ==
1. (Ecuador) Diego Hidalgo / (Argentina) Mariano Kestelboim (semifinals)
2. (Bolivia) Federico Zeballos / (Brazil) Marcelo Zormann (champions)
3. (Bolivia) Boris Arias / (Uruguay) Ignacio Carou (first round)
4. (Mexico) Alan Magadán / (Mexico) Rodrigo Pacheco Méndez (final, retired)

== Draw ==
Key

- Q = Qualifier
- WC = Wild card
- LL = Lucky loser
- Alt = Alternate
- ITF = ITF entry
- PR = Protected ranking
- SR = Special ranking
- SE = Special exempt
- JE = Junior exempt
- JR = Junior Accelerator Programme entrant
- CO = College Accelerator Programme entrant
- NG = Next Gen Accelerator Program entrant
- w/o = Walkover
- r = Retired
- d = Defaulted

First round
1	(Ecuador) D Hidalgo (Argentina) M Kestelboim	6	2	[10]
(Argentina) H Casanova (Argentina) S Rodríguez Taverna	3	6	[4]
(Argentina) F Ribero (Argentina) G Villanueva	4	6	[10]
(United States) Zachary Fuchs (Venezuela) B Pérez	6	3	[8]
4	(Mexico) A Magadán (Mexico) R Pacheco Méndez	7	6
(Argentina) Mateo del Pino (Argentina) Manuel Mouilleron Salvo	5	4
(Peru) G Bueno (Argentina) Carlos María Zárate	4	2
WC	(Colombia) JS Gómez (Colombia) A Urrea	6	6
(Brazil) Bruno Oliveira (Brazil) Natan Rodrigues	7	6
WC	(Colombia) Samuel Heredia (Colombia) A Soriano Barrera	5	2
(Argentina) V Aboian (Argentina) JM La Serna	7^{7}	0	[11]
3	(Bolivia) B Arias (Uruguay) I Carou	6^{5}	6	[9]
(Italy) Matteo Covato (Mexico) A Hernández	6^{5}	4
(Brazil) M Alves (Colombia) C Rodríguez	7^{7}	6
(Chile) T Barrios Vera (Chile) Nicolás Villalón	2	4
2	(Bolivia) F Zeballos (Brazil) M Zormann	6	6

Quarterfinals
1	(Ecuador) D Hidalgo (Argentina) M Kestelboim	6	6
(Argentina) F Ribero (Argentina) G Villanueva	1	2
4	(Mexico) A Magadán (Mexico) R Pacheco Méndez	6	6
WC	(Colombia) JS Gómez (Colombia) A Urrea	4	1
(Brazil) B Oliveira (Brazil) N Rodrigues	w/o
(Argentina) V Aboian (Argentina) JM La Serna
(Brazil) M Alves (Colombia) C Rodríguez	3	6	[9]
2	(Bolivia) F Zeballos (Brazil) M Zormann	6	1	[11]

Semifinals
1	(Ecuador) D Hidalgo (Argentina) M Kestelboim	4	4
4	(Mexico) A Magadán (Mexico) R Pacheco Méndez	6	6
(Brazil) B Oliveira (Brazil) N Rodrigues	4	4
2	(Bolivia) F Zeballos (Brazil) M Zormann	6	6

Final
4	(Mexico) A Magadán (Mexico) R Pacheco Méndez	5^{r}
2	(Bolivia) F Zeballos (Brazil) M Zormann	5
