= 2023 Cali Open – Doubles =

Doubles
- 2023 Cali Open

Final
- Champions: (Argentina) Guido Andreozzi (Colombia) Cristian Rodríguez
- Runners-up: (Brazil) Orlando Luz (Ukraine) Oleg Prihodko
- Score: 6–3, 6–4

Events
Singles	Doubles
← 2022 ·	Cali Open	· 2024 →

Malek Jaziri and Adrián Menéndez Maceiras were the defending champions but chose not to defend their title.

Guido Andreozzi and Cristian Rodríguez won the title after defeating Orlando Luz and Oleg Prihodko 6–3, 6–4 in the final.

== Seeds ==
1. (Argentina) Guido Andreozzi / (Colombia) Cristian Rodríguez (champions)
2. (Mexico) Hans Hach Verdugo / (United States) Evan King (semifinals)
3. (South Korea) Nam Ji-sung / (New Zealand) Artem Sitak (semifinals)
4. (Brazil) Orlando Luz / (Ukraine) Oleg Prihodko (final)

== Draw ==
=== Key ===
- Q = Qualifier
- WC = Wild card
- LL = Lucky loser
- Alt = Alternate
- ITF = ITF entry
- PR = Protected ranking
- SR = Special ranking
- SE = Special exempt
- JE = Junior exempt
- JR = Junior Accelerator Programme entrant
- CO = College Accelerator Programme entrant
- NG = Next Gen Accelerator Program entrant
- w/o = Walkover
- r = Retired
- d = Defaulted

First round
1	(Argentina) G Andreozzi (Colombia) C Rodríguez	6	7^{9}
(United States) G Goldhoff (Chile) M Soto	1	6^{7}
(Brazil) P Boscardin Dias (Brazil) E Ribeiro	5	3
(Australia) C Puttergill (Canada) K Stevenson	7	6
3	(South Korea) J-s Nam (New Zealand) A Sitak	1	6	[13]
Alt	(Austria) G Melzer (Germany) MH Rehberg	6	4	[11]
Alt	(Colombia) Enrique Peña (Colombia) Johan Alexander Rodríguez	2	4
(Brazil) G Heide (Brazil) JL Reis da Silva	6	6
WC	(Colombia) A Soriano Barrera (Colombia) A Urrea	6^{5}	3
(Zimbabwe) B Lock (New Zealand) R Statham	7^{7}	6
PR	(United States) T-S Kwiatkowski (Croatia) N Serdarušić	4	4
4	(Brazil) O Luz (Ukraine) O Prihodko	6	6
(Argentina) MF Descotte (Argentina) Ignacio Monzón	3	5
(Brazil) M Alves (Argentina) S Rodríguez Taverna	6	7
WC	(Spain) D Marrero (United States) Dhruva Mulye	2	2
2	(Mexico) H Hach Verdugo (United States) E King	6	6

Quarterfinals
1	(Argentina) G Andreozzi (Colombia) C Rodríguez	6	7^{7}
(Australia) C Puttergill (Canada) K Stevenson	4	6^{4}
3	(South Korea) J-s Nam (New Zealand) A Sitak	6	6
(Brazil) G Heide (Brazil) JL Reis da Silva	2	4
(Zimbabwe) B Lock (New Zealand) R Statham	3	6^{3}
4	(Brazil) O Luz (Ukraine) O Prihodko	6	7^{7}
(Brazil) M Alves (Argentina) S Rodríguez Taverna	6^{3}	0^{r}
2	(Mexico) H Hach Verdugo (United States) E King	7^{7}	3

Semifinals
1	(Argentina) G Andreozzi (Colombia) C Rodríguez	6	6
3	(South Korea) J-s Nam (New Zealand) A Sitak	3	3
4	(Brazil) O Luz (Ukraine) O Prihodko	3	6	[10]
2	(Mexico) H Hach Verdugo (United States) E King	6	2	[4]

Final
1	(Argentina) G Andreozzi (Colombia) C Rodríguez	6	6
4	(Brazil) O Luz (Ukraine) O Prihodko	3	4
