= 2025 Cali Open – Singles =

Singles
- 2025 Cali Open

Final
- Champion: (Chile) Tomás Barrios Vera
- Runner-up: (Bolivia) Juan Carlos Prado Ángelo
- Score: 6–1, 6–4

Events
Singles	Doubles
- Cali Open

Juan Pablo Ficovich was the defending champion but lost in the second round to Matías Soto.

Tomás Barrios Vera won the title after defeating Juan Carlos Prado Ángelo 6–1, 6–4 in the final.

== Seeds ==
1. (Chile) Tomás Barrios Vera (champion)
2. (Argentina) Juan Pablo Ficovich (second round)
3. (Brazil) Thiago Seyboth Wild (first round)
4. (Lebanon) Hady Habib (second round)
5. (Austria) Lukas Neumayer (first round)
6. (Colombia) Nicolás Mejía (quarterfinals)
7. (Mexico) Rodrigo Pacheco Méndez (first round)
8. (Ecuador) Álvaro Guillén Meza (second round)

== Draw ==
Key

- Q = Qualifier
- WC = Wild card
- LL = Lucky loser
- Alt = Alternate
- ITF = ITF entry
- PR = Protected ranking
- SR = Special ranking
- SE = Special exempt
- JE = Junior exempt
- JR = Junior Accelerator Programme entrant
- CO = College Accelerator Programme entrant
- NG = Next Gen Accelerator Program entrant
- w/o = Walkover
- r = Retired
- d = Defaulted

=== Finals ===
Semifinals
1	(Chile) Tomás Barrios Vera	6	6
Q	(Argentina) Juan Bautista Torres	4	2
(Peru) Gonzalo Bueno	3	5
(Bolivia) Juan Carlos Prado Ángelo	6	7

Final
1	(Chile) Tomás Barrios Vera	6	6
(Bolivia) Juan Carlos Prado Ángelo	1	4

=== Top half ===
First round
1	(Chile) T Barrios Vera	6	6
LL	(Mexico) A Hernández	1	2
(Paraguay) AD Vallejo	4	4
Q	(Argentina) LE Ambrogi	6	6
Q	(Argentina) GI Justo	2	3
Q	(Brazil) M Alves	6	6
(Argentina) FA Gómez	6^{3}	6	6
5	(Austria) L Neumayer	7^{7}	2	2
3	(Brazil) T Seyboth Wild	6^{3}	4
(Brazil) D Dutra da Silva	7^{7}	6
(Ecuador) A Andrade	4	0
Q	(Argentina) JB Torres	6	6
Q	(Argentina) M Kestelboim	3	6^{2}
Alt	(Uruguay) F Roncadelli	6	7^{7}
Q	(Argentina) TA Tirante	6^{2}	4
6	(Colombia) N Mejía	7^{7}	6

Second round
1	(Chile) T Barrios Vera	6	6
Q	(Argentina) LE Ambrogi	4	2
Q	(Brazil) M Alves	6	6
(Argentina) FA Gómez	3	2
(Brazil) D Dutra da Silva	2	4
Q	(Argentina) JB Torres	6	6
Alt	(Uruguay) F Roncadelli	4	2
6	(Colombia) N Mejía	6	6

Quarterfinals
1	(Chile) T Barrios Vera	6	6
Q	(Brazil) M Alves	4	2
Q	(Argentina) JB Torres	6	6
6	(Colombia) N Mejía	4	3

Semifinals
1	(Chile) T Barrios Vera	6	6
Q	(Argentina) JB Torres	4	2

=== Bottom half ===
First round
8	(Ecuador) Á Guillén Meza	7	6
(Brazil) M Pucinelli de Almeida	5	3
(Peru) JP Varillas	6	6
WC	(Colombia) Samuel Heredia	4	4
WC	(Colombia) Samuel Alejandro Linde Palacios	2	2
(Peru) G Bueno	6	6
(Argentina) N Kicker	3	7^{7}	2
4	(Lebanon) H Habib	6	6^{5}	6
7	(Mexico) R Pacheco Méndez	3	7	3
(Bolivia) JC Prado Ángelo	6	5	6
(Spain) N Sánchez Izquierdo	5	6^{5}
(Argentina) A Collarini	7	7^{7}
(Chile) M Soto	7^{7}	6
WC	(Colombia) Miguel Tobón	6^{4}	3
(Argentina) G Villanueva	3	2
2	(Argentina) JP Ficovich	6	6

Second round
8	(Ecuador) Á Guillén Meza	3	7^{7}	4
(Peru) JP Varillas	6	6^{4}	6
(Peru) G Bueno	6	6
4	(Lebanon) H Habib	3	4
(Bolivia) JC Prado Ángelo	3	7^{7}	6
(Argentina) A Collarini	6	6^{4}	2
(Chile) M Soto	7^{7}	6
2	(Argentina) JP Ficovich	6^{3}	1

Quarterfinals
(Peru) JP Varillas	4	6	2
(Peru) G Bueno	6	4	6
(Bolivia) JC Prado Ángelo	7^{7}	6
(Chile) M Soto	6^{1}	1

Semifinals
(Peru) G Bueno	3	5
(Bolivia) JC Prado Ángelo	6	7
