= 2023 Cali Open – Singles =

Singles
- 2023 Cali Open

Final
- Champion: (Argentina) Federico Delbonis
- Runner-up: (Argentina) Guido Andreozzi
- Score: 6–4, 6–7^{(6–8)}, 6–3

Events
Singles	Doubles
- Cali Open

Facundo Mena was the defending champion but chose not to defend his title.

Federico Delbonis won the title after defeating Guido Andreozzi 6–4, 6–7^{(6–8)}, 6–3 in the final.

== Seeds ==
1. (Chile) Alejandro Tabilo (quarterfinals)
2. (Argentina) Román Andrés Burruchaga (first round)
3. (Canada) Alexis Galarneau (second round)
4. (Colombia) Nicolás Mejía (second round)
5. (Argentina) Santiago Rodríguez Taverna (semifinals)
6. (Argentina) Federico Delbonis (champion)
7. (Brazil) João Lucas Reis da Silva (first round)
8. (Argentina) Guido Andreozzi (final)

== Draw ==
Key

- Q = Qualifier
- WC = Wild card
- LL = Lucky loser
- Alt = Alternate
- ITF = ITF entry
- PR = Protected ranking
- SR = Special ranking
- SE = Special exempt
- JE = Junior exempt
- JR = Junior Accelerator Programme entrant
- CO = College Accelerator Programme entrant
- NG = Next Gen Accelerator Program entrant
- w/o = Walkover
- r = Retired
- d = Defaulted

=== Finals ===
Semifinals
5	(Argentina) Santiago Rodríguez Taverna	6^{3}	3
6	(Argentina) Federico Delbonis	7^{7}	6
PR	(Brazil) Pedro Sakamoto	4	4
8	(Argentina) Guido Andreozzi	6	6

Final
6	(Argentina) Federico Delbonis	6	6^{6}	6
8	(Argentina) Guido Andreozzi	4	7^{8}	3

=== Top half ===
First round
1	(Chile) A Tabilo	7^{15}	6
(United States) Christian Langmo	6^{13}	4
Q	(Argentina) JI Londero	6	6
Q	(Argentina) Ignacio Monzón	1	2
WC	(Colombia) A Soriano Barrera	3	6^{5}
(Croatia) N Serdarušić	6	7^{7}
(India) M Sasikumar	6^{3}	6^{5}
5	(Argentina) S Rodríguez Taverna	7^{7}	7^{7}
4/WC	(Colombia) N Mejía	6	6
Q	(Colombia) Alejandro Hoyos	2	1
Alt	(Brazil) G Heide	6	6
(Germany) MH Rehberg	3	3
(Australia) T Schoolkate	7^{7}	7
PR	(United States) T-S Kwiatkowski	6^{5}	5
(Brazil) E Ribeiro	2	3
6	(Argentina) F Delbonis	6	6

Second round
1	(Chile) A Tabilo	6	6
Q	(Argentina) JI Londero	3	4
(Croatia) N Serdarušić	6^{5}	4
5	(Argentina) S Rodríguez Taverna	7^{7}	6
4/WC	(Colombia) N Mejía	2	2
Alt	(Brazil) G Heide	6	6
(Australia) T Schoolkate	6^{7}	1
6	(Argentina) F Delbonis	7^{9}	6

Quarterfinals
1	(Chile) A Tabilo	6	3	6^{5}
5	(Argentina) S Rodríguez Taverna	4	6	7^{7}
Alt	(Brazil) G Heide	0	2
6	(Argentina) F Delbonis	6	6

Semifinals
5	(Argentina) S Rodríguez Taverna	6^{3}	3
6	(Argentina) F Delbonis	7^{7}	6

=== Bottom half ===
First round
7	(Brazil) JL Reis da Silva	3	6	3
(Austria) G Melzer	6	3	6
(United States) A Rybakov	4	6^{3}
Alt	(Brazil) O Luz	6	7^{7}
PR	(Brazil) P Sakamoto	7	6
(United States) P Kypson	5	3
Q	(Chile) G Lama	3	6	3
3	(Canada) A Galarneau	6	3	6
8	(Argentina) G Andreozzi	6	6
(Zimbabwe) B Lock	4	4
(Argentina) MF Descotte	6	7
WC	(Colombia) Johan Alexander Rodríguez	3	5
PR	(New Zealand) R Statham	1^{r}
Q	(Brazil) P Boscardin Dias	4
Q	(Chile) M Soto	6	6
2	(Argentina) RA Burruchaga	2	4

Second round
(Austria) G Melzer	6	7^{7}
Alt	(Brazil) O Luz	4	6^{5}
PR	(Brazil) P Sakamoto	7^{7}	6
3	(Canada) A Galarneau	6^{5}	2
8	(Argentina) G Andreozzi	7^{7}	6
(Argentina) MF Descotte	6^{2}	3
Q	(Brazil) P Boscardin Dias	6	6
Q	(Chile) M Soto	4	3

Quarterfinals
(Austria) G Melzer	7^{7}	4	6^{8}
PR	(Brazil) P Sakamoto	6^{4}	6	7^{10}
8	(Argentina) G Andreozzi	6	6
Q	(Brazil) P Boscardin Dias	3	2

Semifinals
PR	(Brazil) P Sakamoto	4	4
8	(Argentina) G Andreozzi	6	6
