= 2025 Cali Open – Doubles =

Doubles
- 2025 Cali Open

Final
- Champions: (Argentina) Federico Agustín Gómez (Venezuela) Luis David Martínez
- Runners-up: (Argentina) Guido Iván Justo (Uruguay) Franco Roncadelli
- Score: 6–4, 6–4

Events
Singles	Doubles
- Cali Open

Juan Carlos Aguilar and Conner Huertas del Pino were the defending champions but chose not to defend their title.

Federico Agustín Gómez and Luis David Martínez won the title after defeating Guido Iván Justo and Franco Roncadelli 6–4, 6–4 in the final.

== Seeds ==
1. (Argentina) Mariano Kestelboim / (Mexico) Miguel Ángel Reyes-Varela (quarterfinals)
2. (Argentina) Federico Agustín Gómez / (Venezuela) Luis David Martínez (champions)
3. (Colombia) Cristian Rodríguez / (Bolivia) Federico Zeballos (semifinals)
4. (Peru) Arklon Huertas del Pino / (Chile) Matías Soto (semifinals)

== Draw ==
Key

- Q = Qualifier
- WC = Wild card
- LL = Lucky loser
- Alt = Alternate
- ITF = ITF entry
- PR = Protected ranking
- SR = Special ranking
- SE = Special exempt
- JE = Junior exempt
- JR = Junior Accelerator Programme entrant
- CO = College Accelerator Programme entrant
- NG = Next Gen Accelerator Program entrant
- w/o = Walkover
- r = Retired
- d = Defaulted

=== Draw ===
First round
1	(Argentina) M Kestelboim (Mexico) M Reyes-Varela	7^{7}	7
PR	(Colombia) JS Gómez (Colombia) N Mejía	6^{4}	5
(Argentina) GI Justo (Uruguay) F Roncadelli	6	6
(Argentina) A Collarini (Ecuador) Á Guillén Meza	1	2
4	(Peru) A Huertas del Pino (Chile) M Soto	7^{9}	6
(Brazil) L Britto (Zimbabwe) CJ Lock	6^{7}	3
(Argentina) F Ribero (Argentina) G Villanueva	6	1	[8]
(Bolivia) B Arias (Brazil) D Dutra da Silva	4	6	[10]
(Mexico) A Hernández (Mexico) R Pacheco Méndez	3	3
(Brazil) M Alves (Brazil) Bruno Oliveira	6	6
WC	(Colombia) Samuel Heredia (Colombia) Samuel Alejandro Linde Palacios	3	4
3	(Colombia) C Rodríguez (Bolivia) F Zeballos	6	6
(Austria) L Neumayer (Spain) N Sánchez Izquierdo	3	4
WC	(Colombia) Pablo Robledo (Colombia) Miguel Tobón	6	6
(Romania) Sebastian Gima (Venezuela) B Pérez	1	3
2	(Argentina) FA Gómez (Venezuela) LD Martínez	6	6

Quarterfinals
1	(Argentina) M Kestelboim (Mexico) M Reyes-Varela	0	6^{4}
(Argentina) GI Justo (Uruguay) F Roncadelli	6	7^{7}
4	(Peru) A Huertas del Pino (Chile) M Soto	6	6^{1}	[11]
(Bolivia) B Arias (Brazil) D Dutra da Silva	2	7^{7}	[9]
(Brazil) M Alves (Brazil) B Oliveira	6	2	[5]
3	(Colombia) C Rodríguez (Bolivia) F Zeballos	3	6	[10]
WC	(Colombia) P Robledo (Colombia) M Tobón	3	1
2	(Argentina) FA Gómez (Venezuela) LD Martínez	6	6

Semifinals
(Argentina) GI Justo (Uruguay) F Roncadelli	6^{4}	7	[11]
4	(Peru) A Huertas del Pino (Chile) M Soto	7^{7}	5	[9]
3	(Colombia) C Rodríguez (Bolivia) F Zeballos	4	6	[5]
2	(Argentina) FA Gómez (Venezuela) LD Martínez	6	3	[10]

Final
(Argentina) GI Justo (Uruguay) F Roncadelli	4	4
2	(Argentina) FA Gómez (Venezuela) LD Martínez	6	6
