= 2022 Salvador Challenger – Singles =

Singles
- 2022 Salvador Challenger

Final
- Champion: (Portugal) João Domingues
- Runner-up: (Chile) Tomás Barrios Vera
- Score: 7–6^{(11–9)}, 6–1

Events
| Singles | Doubles |
- Salvador Challenger

This was the first edition of the tournament and was part of the 2022 Legión Sudamericana.

João Domingues won the title after defeating Tomás Barrios Vera 7–6^{(11–9)}, 6–1 in the final.

== Seeds ==
1. (Chile) Tomás Barrios Vera (final)
2. (Argentina) Renzo Olivo (semifinals)
3. (Argentina) Camilo Ugo Carabelli (withdrew)
4. (Brazil) Felipe Meligeni Alves (first round)
5. (Argentina) Nicolás Kicker (first round)
6. (Argentina) Santiago Rodríguez Taverna (second round)
7. (Brazil) Matheus Pucinelli de Almeida (first round)
8. (Chile) Gonzalo Lama (quarterfinals)

== Draw ==
Key

- Q = Qualifier
- WC = Wild card
- LL = Lucky loser
- Alt = Alternate
- ITF = ITF entry
- PR = Protected ranking
- SR = Special ranking
- SE = Special exempt
- JE = Junior exempt
- JR = Junior Accelerator Programme entrant
- CO = College Accelerator Programme entrant
- NG = Next Gen Accelerator Program entrant
- w/o = Walkover
- r = Retired
- d = Defaulted

=== Finals ===
Semifinals
1 | (Chile) Tomás Barrios Vera | 6^{0} | 6 | 6
Alt | (Argentina) Gonzalo Villanueva | 7^{7} | 3 | 4
(Portugal) João Domingues | 4 | 6 | 7
2 | (Argentina) Renzo Olivo | 6 | 3 | 5

Final
1 | (Chile) Tomás Barrios Vera | 6^{9} | 1
(Portugal) João Domingues | 7^{11} | 6

=== Top half ===
First round
1 | (Chile) T Barrios Vera | 6 | 6
(Brazil) J Menezes | 2 | 3
WC | (Brazil) JL Reis da Silva | 3 | 7^{7} | 6
Q | (Argentina) RA Burruchaga | 6 | 6^{5} | 4
Alt | (Brazil) M Alves | 4 | 2
WC | (Brazil) G Heide | 6 | 6
Q | (Argentina) MF Descotte | 1 | 3
8 | (Chile) G Lama | 6 | 6
4 | (Brazil) F Meligeni Alves | 5 | 4
Alt | (Argentina) G Villanueva | 7 | 6
(Argentina) JB Torres | 6 | 5 | 5
(Argentina) H Casanova | 3 | 7 | 7
(Peru) N Álvarez | 4 | 3
(Brazil) D Dutra da Silva | 6 | 6
Alt | (Spain) P Martín Tiffon | 4 | 4
6 | (Argentina) S Rodríguez Taverna | 6 | 6

Second round
1 | (Chile) T Barrios Vera | 6 | 7^{7}
WC | (Brazil) JL Reis da Silva | 3 | 6^{1}
WC | (Brazil) G Heide | 6^{3} | 6 | 6^{3}
8 | (Chile) G Lama | 7^{7} | 0 | 7^{7}
Alt | (Argentina) G Villanueva | 6 | 6
(Argentina) H Casanova | 3 | 0
(Brazil) D Dutra da Silva | 6 | 6
6 | (Argentina) S Rodríguez Taverna | 4 | 1

Quarterfinals
1 | (Chile) T Barrios Vera | 6 | 6
8 | (Chile) G Lama | 2 | 3
Alt | (Argentina) G Villanueva | 6 | 6
(Brazil) D Dutra da Silva | 2 | 4

Semifinals
1 | (Chile) T Barrios Vera | 6^{0} | 6 | 6
Alt | (Argentina) G Villanueva | 7^{7} | 3 | 4

=== Bottom half ===
First round
7 | (Brazil) M Pucinelli de Almeida | 5 | 2
Q | (Brazil) Wilson Leite | 7 | 6
Alt | (Colombia) C Rodríguez | 4 | 0^{r}
(Argentina) Facundo Juárez | 6 | 3
(Argentina) F Comesaña | 6^{6} | 4
(Dominican Republic) N Hardt | 7^{8} | 6
(Portugal) J Domingues | 3
Q | (Argentina) AL Lingua Lavallén | 2^{r}
5 | (Argentina) N Kicker | 5 | 6^{6}
Q | (Brazil) P Boscardin Dias | 7 | 7^{8}
WC | (Brazil) JVC Loureiro | 4 | 2
(Brazil) O Luz | 6 | 6
Alt | (Brazil) Gilbert Klier Júnior | 6 | 6
LL | (Argentina) Matías Zukas | 3 | 0
Q | (Peru) C Huertas del Pino | 1 | 2
2 | (Argentina) R Olivo | 6 | 6

Second round
Q | (Brazil) W Leite | 6 | 6
(Argentina) F Juárez | 2 | 4
(Dominican Republic) N Hardt | 6 | 0 | 1
(Portugal) J Domingues | 4 | 6 | 6
Q | (Brazil) P Boscardin Dias | 7 | 6
(Brazil) O Luz | 5 | 4
Alt | (Brazil) G Klier Júnior | 4 | 4
2 | (Argentina) R Olivo | 6 | 6

Quarterfinals
Q | (Brazil) W Leite | 6^{4} | 3
(Portugal) J Domingues | 7^{7} | 6
Q | (Brazil) P Boscardin Dias | 7 | 6^{4} | 2
2 | (Argentina) R Olivo | 5 | 7^{7} | 6

Semifinals
(Portugal) J Domingues | 4 | 6 | 7
2 | (Argentina) R Olivo | 6 | 3 | 5
