= 2024 Cali Open – Singles =

Singles
- 2024 Cali Open

Final
- Champion: (Argentina) Juan Pablo Ficovich
- Runner-up: (Peru) Gonzalo Bueno
- Score: 6–1, 6–4

Events
Singles	Doubles
- Cali Open

Federico Delbonis was the defending champion but he retired from professional tennis.

Juan Pablo Ficovich won the title after defeating Gonzalo Bueno 6–1, 6–4 in the final.

== Seeds ==
1. (Argentina) Thiago Agustín Tirante (second round)
2. (Bolivia) Hugo Dellien (semifinals)
3. (Argentina) Román Andrés Burruchaga (second round, retired)
4. (Bolivia) Murkel Dellien (first round)
5. (Argentina) Juan Manuel Cerúndolo (second round)
6. (Argentina) Facundo Mena (first round)
7. (France) Enzo Couacaud (quarterfinals)
8. (Argentina) Santiago Rodríguez Taverna (second round)

== Draw ==
Key

- Q = Qualifier
- WC = Wild card
- LL = Lucky loser
- Alt = Alternate
- ITF = ITF entry
- PR = Protected ranking
- SR = Special ranking
- SE = Special exempt
- JE = Junior exempt
- JR = Junior Accelerator Programme entrant
- CO = College Accelerator Programme entrant
- NG = Next Gen Accelerator Program entrant
- w/o = Walkover
- r = Retired
- d = Defaulted

=== Finals ===
Semifinals
(Peru) Gonzalo Bueno	6	6
(Argentina) Andrea Collarini	4	1
(Argentina) Juan Pablo Ficovich	5	6	7
2	(Bolivia) Hugo Dellien	7	1	5

Final
(Peru) Gonzalo Bueno	1	4
(Argentina) Juan Pablo Ficovich	6	6

=== Top half ===
First round
1	(Argentina) TA Tirante	6	6
WC	(Colombia) Frazier Rengifo	3	1
(Peru) G Bueno	6	6
(Argentina) R Olivo	3	3
Q	(Brazil) Wilson Leite	4	6	3
Alt	(Argentina) LE Ambrogi	6	4	6
Alt	(Brazil) O Luz	7^{11}	1	6
6	(Argentina) F Mena	6^{9}	6	4
4	(Bolivia) M Dellien	2	2
Q	(Argentina) JI Londero	6	6
(Argentina) A Collarini	6	7
Alt	(Argentina) V Aboian	2	5
(Argentina) G Villanueva	3	5
(Brazil) M Alves	6	7
WC	(Colombia) Johan Alexander Rodríguez	4	2
8	(Argentina) S Rodríguez Taverna	6	6

Second round
1	(Argentina) TA Tirante	4	6	3
(Peru) G Bueno	6	3	6
Alt	(Argentina) LE Ambrogi	6	3	7^{9}
Alt	(Brazil) O Luz	3	6	6^{7}
Q	(Argentina) JI Londero	3	3
(Argentina) A Collarini	6	6
(Brazil) M Alves	7	6
8	(Argentina) S Rodríguez Taverna	5	4

Quarterfinals
(Peru) G Bueno	6^{1}	6	6
Alt	(Argentina) LE Ambrogi	7^{7}	1	2
(Argentina) A Collarini	6	6
(Brazil) M Alves	0	3

Semifinals
(Peru) G Bueno	6	6
(Argentina) A Collarini	4	1

=== Bottom half ===
First round
5	(Argentina) JM Cerúndolo	6	7
Q	(Colombia) Samuel Heredia	2	5
(Argentina) JB Torres	6	6
(Bolivia) JC Prado Ángelo	3	1
Q	(Dominican Republic) P Bertran	4	6	0
(Argentina) JP Ficovich	6	4	6
Q	(Colombia) JS Gómez	2	1
3	(Argentina) RA Burruchaga	6	6
7	(France) E Couacaud	4	6	7^{7}
(Brazil) D Dutra da Silva	6	4	6^{1}
WC	(Greece) Pa Tsitsipas	6^{7}	1
(Uruguay) F Roncadelli	7^{9}	6
(Ecuador) Á Guillén Meza	6	3	4
Q	(Canada) JC Aguilar	2	6	6
Alt	(Brazil) J Pereira	6^{2}	3
2	(Bolivia) H Dellien	7^{7}	6

Second round
5	(Argentina) JM Cerúndolo	1	2
(Argentina) JB Torres	6	6
(Argentina) JP Ficovich	6^{5}	6	5
3	(Argentina) RA Burruchaga	7^{7}	3	1^{r}
7	(France) E Couacaud	6	6
(Uruguay) F Roncadelli	4	2
Q	(Canada) JC Aguilar	4	3
2	(Bolivia) H Dellien	6	6

Quarterfinals
(Argentina) JB Torres	1	7^{7}	2
(Argentina) JP Ficovich	6	6^{4}	6
7	(France) E Couacaud	6^{3}	5
2	(Bolivia) H Dellien	7^{7}	7

Semifinals
(Argentina) JP Ficovich	5	6	7
2	(Bolivia) H Dellien	7	1	5
