= 2022 Cali Open – Doubles =

Doubles
- 2022 Cali Open

Final
- Champions: (Tunisia) Malek Jaziri (Spain) Adrián Menéndez Maceiras
- Runners-up: (United States) Keegan Smith (United States) Evan Zhu
- Score: 7–5, 6–4

Events
Singles	Doubles
- Cali Open

This was the first edition of the tournament. The tournament originated as a quick replacement for the 2022 edition of the Quito Challenger, which was moved to Cali due to political unrest in Quito.

Malek Jaziri and Adrián Menéndez Maceiras won the title after defeating Keegan Smith and Evan Zhu 7–5, 6–4 in the final.

== Seeds ==
1. (India) Sriram Balaji / (India) Jeevan Nedunchezhiyan (semifinals)
2. (South Korea) Chung Yun-seong / (Greece) Michail Pervolarakis (first round)
3. (Spain) Carlos Gómez-Herrera / (Ecuador) Roberto Quiroz (withdrew)
4. (Brazil) Mateus Alves / (Colombia) Nicolás Mejía (first round)
5. (Norway) Viktor Durasovic / (Portugal) Gonçalo Oliveira (semifinals)

== Draw ==
Key

- Q = Qualifier
- WC = Wild card
- LL = Lucky loser
- Alt = Alternate
- ITF = ITF entry
- PR = Protected ranking
- SR = Special ranking
- SE = Special exempt
- JE = Junior exempt
- JR = Junior Accelerator Programme entrant
- CO = College Accelerator Programme entrant
- NG = Next Gen Accelerator Program entrant
- w/o = Walkover
- r = Retired
- d = Defaulted

First round
1	(India) S Balaji (India) J Nedunchezhiyan	w/o
(Serbia) P Krstin (Serbia) M Zekić
Alt	(Japan) N Nakagawa (Japan) Kosuke Ogura	6^{3}	5
(Uruguay) I Carou (Argentina) F Mena	7^{7}	7
4	(Brazil) M Alves (Colombia) N Mejía	6^{4}	3
Alt	(United States) K Smith (United States) E Zhu	7^{7}	6
(Argentina) JP Ficovich (Argentina) Matías Zukas	6	5	[10]
Alt	(United Kingdom) Blu Baker (New Zealand) K Pannu	4	7	[6]
(Argentina) Facundo Juárez (Argentina) G Villanueva	7	6^{5}	[7]
Alt	(United States) A Kovacevic (Brazil) Fernando Yamacita	5	7^{7}	[10]
Alt	(Argentina) Ignacio Monzón (Argentina) Juan Bautista Otegui	1	4
5	(Norway) V Durasovic (Portugal) G Oliveira	6	6
(Brazil) F Meligeni Alves (Brazil) J Menezes
WC	(Colombia) Mateo Gómez (Colombia) A Urrea	w/o
(Tunisia) M Jaziri (Spain) A Menéndez Maceiras	1	6	[10]
2	(South Korea) Y-s Chung (Greece) M Pervolarakis	6	4	[8]

Quarterfinals
1	(India) S Balaji (India) J Nedunchezhiyan	7	4
(Uruguay) I Carou (Argentina) F Mena	5	2^{r}
Alt	(United States) K Smith (United States) E Zhu	w/o
(Argentina) JP Ficovich (Argentina) M Zukas
Alt	(United States) A Kovacevic (Brazil) F Yamacita	4	4
5	(Norway) V Durasovic (Portugal) G Oliveira	6	6
WC	(Colombia) M Gómez (Colombia) A Urrea	3	6^{6}
(Tunisia) M Jaziri (Spain) A Menéndez Maceiras	6	7^{8}

Semifinals
1	(India) S Balaji (India) J Nedunchezhiyan	4	6	[6]
Alt	(United States) K Smith (United States) E Zhu	6	1	[10]
5	(Norway) V Durasovic (Portugal) G Oliveira	3	2
(Tunisia) M Jaziri (Spain) A Menéndez Maceiras	6	6

Final
Alt	(United States) K Smith (United States) E Zhu	5	4
(Tunisia) M Jaziri (Spain) A Menéndez Maceiras	7	6
