= 2026 Cali Open =

- Date: 19 – 25 October
- Edition: 5th
- Surface: Clay
- Location: Cali, Colombia

Champions

Singles
- (Brazil) Matheus Pucinelli de Almeida

Doubles
- (Bolivia) Federico Zeballos / (Brazil) Marcelo Zormann
- Cali Open

The 2026 Cali Open was a professional tennis tournament played on clay courts. It was the fifth edition of the tournament which was part of the 2026 ATP Challenger Tour. It took place in Cali, Colombia between 19 and 25 October 2026.

== Singles main draw entrants ==
=== Seeds ===
Country	Player	Rank^{1}	Seed
BRA	Gustavo Heide	116	1
COL	Nicolás Mejía	119	2
ARG	Francisco Comesaña	125	3
BOL	Hugo Dellien	128	4
CHI	Tomás Barrios Vera	132	5
~~BRA~~	~~Thiago Seyboth Wild~~	~~136~~	~~6~~
PER	Gonzalo Bueno	183	7
ARG	Facundo Mena	197	8

- ^{1} Rankings as of 5 October 2026.

=== Other entrants ===
The following players received wildcards into the singles main draw:

- (Colombia) Samuel Heredia
- (Chile) Nicolas Jarry
- (Colombia) Miguel Tobón

The following player received entry into the singles main draw using a protected ranking:

- (Argentina) Federico Coria

The following players received entry from the qualifying draw:

- (Germany) Diego Dedura
- (Brazil) Felipe Meligeni Alves
- (Brazil) José Pereira
- (Argentina) Franco Ribero
- (Argentina) Santiago Rodríguez Taverna
- (Colombia) Daniel Salazar

The following player received entry as a lucky loser:

- (Mexico) Alex Hernández

== Champions ==
=== Singles ===
- (Brazil) Matheus Pucinelli de Almeida def. (Argentina) Valerio Aboian 7–6^{(7–1)}, 6–3.

=== Doubles ===
- (Bolivia) Federico Zeballos / (Brazil) Marcelo Zormann def. (Mexico) Alan Magadán / (Mexico) Rodrigo Pacheco Méndez 5–5 retired.
