= 2023 Cali Open =

- Date: 19 – 24 June
- Edition: 2nd
- Surface: Clay
- Location: Cali, Colombia

Champions

Singles
- (Argentina) Federico Delbonis

Doubles
- (Argentina) Guido Andreozzi / (Colombia) Cristian Rodríguez
← 2022 ·	Cali Open	· 2024 →

The 2023 Cali Open was a professional tennis tournament played on clay courts. It was the second edition of the tournament which was part of the 2023 ATP Challenger Tour. It took place in Cali, Colombia between 19 and 24 June 2023.

== Singles main draw entrants ==
=== Seeds ===
Country	Player	Rank^{1}	Seed
CHI	Alejandro Tabilo	148	1
ARG	Román Andrés Burruchaga	222	2
CAN	Alexis Galarneau	224	3
COL	Nicolás Mejía	247	4
ARG	Santiago Rodríguez Taverna	249	5
ARG	Federico Delbonis	264	6
BRA	João Lucas Reis da Silva	265	7
ARG	Guido Andreozzi	279	8

- ^{1} Rankings as of 12 June 2023.

=== Other entrants ===
The following players received wildcards into the singles main draw:

- (Colombia) Nicolás Mejía
- (Colombia) Johan Alexander Rodríguez
- (Colombia) Adrià Soriano Barrera

The following players received entry into the singles main draw using protected rankings:

- (United States) Thai-Son Kwiatkowski
- (Brazil) Pedro Sakamoto
- (New Zealand) Rubin Statham

The following players received entry into the singles main draw as alternates:

- (Brazil) Gustavo Heide
- (Brazil) Orlando Luz

The following players received entry from the qualifying draw:

- (Brazil) Pedro Boscardin Dias
- (Colombia) Alejandro Hoyos
- (Chile) Gonzalo Lama
- (Argentina) Juan Ignacio Londero
- (Argentina) Ignacio Monzón
- (Chile) Matías Soto

== Champions ==
=== Singles ===
- (Argentina) Federico Delbonis def. (Argentina) Guido Andreozzi 6–4, 6–7^{(6–8)}, 6–3.

=== Doubles ===
- (Argentina) Guido Andreozzi / (Colombia) Cristian Rodríguez def. (Brazil) Orlando Luz / (Ukraine) Oleg Prihodko 6–3, 6–4.
