= Alexey Zakharov =

Russian tennis player (born 2000)

- Full name: Alexey Alexeyevich Zakharov
- Native name: Алексей Алексеевич Захаров
- Country (sports): Russia
- Born: 21 April 2000 (age 26) Moscow, Russia
- Height: 1.88 m (6 ft 2 in)
- Plays: Right-handed (two-handed backhand)
- Coach: Andrey Chesnokov
- Prize money: US $92,616

Singles
- Career record: 0–0
- Career titles: 4 ITF
- Highest ranking: No. 297 (25 November 2024)

Grand Slam singles results
- Australian Open Junior: QF (2017)
- French Open Junior: 3R (2017)
- Wimbledon Junior: 1R (2017)
- US Open Junior: 1R (2017)

Doubles
- Career record: 0–0
- Career titles: 2 ITF
- Highest ranking: No. 455 (26 July 2021)

Grand Slam doubles results
- Australian Open Junior: QF (2017, 2018)
- French Open Junior: 1R (2017, 2018)
- Wimbledon Junior: QF (2017)
- US Open Junior: 2R (2017)

Alexey Alexeyevich Zakharov (Russian: Алексей Алексеевич Захаров; born 21 April 2000) is a Russian professional tennis player. He has a career-high ATP singles ranking of No. 297 achieved on 25 November 2024 and a doubles ranking of No. 455 achieved on 26 July 2021.

== Early life ==
Alexey Zakharov is from Moscow. He briefly trained at the Mouratoglou Tennis Academy in France.

== Junior career ==
Zakharov represented Russia in the 2016 Junior Davis Cup, in which he and teammates Alen Avidzba and Timofey Skatov won the title. Partnering Avidzba, he won the deciding doubles match in the final against Canada, defeating Felix Auger-Aliassime and Chih Chi Huang in straight sets.

He was a quarterfinalist of junior Grand Slam tournaments four times and won 10 ITF junior tournaments (two in singles), reaching 12th place in the ITF World Junior ranking in 2018.

== Professional career ==
In November 2023, he won the $15k event in Ipoh, his first title since his hiatus. In July 2024, he reached the final of the Dutch Open as a qualifier, losing to wildcard entrant Tomás Barrios Vera in the final.

== Personal life ==
He dated fellow tennis player Marta Kostyuk from 2019 to 2020.

== ATP Challenger and ITF Futures/World Tennis Tour finals ==
=== Singles: 11 (4 titles, 7 runner-ups) ===
Legend ATP Challenger Tour (0–1) ITF Futures/World Tennis Tour (4–6)	Finals by surface Hard (3–6) Clay (1–1) Grass (0–0) Carpet (0–0)

Result	W–L	Date	Tournament	Tier	Surface	Opponent	Score
Loss	0–1	Oct 2018	F35 Monastir, Tunisia	Futures	Hard	(Germany) Robert Strombachs	4–6, 0–6
Win	1–1	Aug 2019	M15 Moscow, Russia	World Tennis Tour	Clay	(Russia) Alen Avidzba	4–6, 7–5, 6–1
Loss	1–2	Sep 2019	M15 Shymkent, Kazakhstan	World Tennis Tour	Hard	(Uzbekistan) Sergey Fomin	6–2, 2–6, 4–6
Loss	1–3	Nov 2019	M15 Sharm El Sheikh, Egypt	World Tennis Tour	Hard	(Egypt) Karim-Mohamed Maamoun	7–6^{(7–2)}, 3–6, 4–6
Win	2–3	Nov 2019	M15 Sharm El Sheikh, Egypt	World Tennis Tour	Hard	(Germany) Lucas Hellfritsch	6–4, 6–1
Win	3–3	Feb 2020	M25 Aktobe, Kazakhstan	World Tennis Tour	Hard	(Russia) Evgenii Tiurnev	7–6^{(7–5)}, 3–6, 6–3
Loss	3–4	Feb 2021	M15 Saint Petersburg, Russia	World Tennis Tour	Hard	(Russia) Alibek Kachmazov	4–6, 7–5, 4–6
Loss	3–5	Mar 2021	M15 Kazan, Russia	World Tennis Tour	Hard	(Turkey) Yankı Erel	3–6, 0–3 ret.
Win	4–5	Nov 2023	M15 Ipoh, Malaysia	World Tennis Tour	Hard	(Japan) Takuya Kumasaka	6–0, 6–3
Loss	4–6	Nov 2023	M15 Kuala Lumpur, Malaysia	World Tennis Tour	Hard	(South Korea) Yeongseok Jeong	6–1, 6–7^{(6–8)}, 4–6
Loss	4–7	Jul 2024	Amersfoort, Netherlands	Challenger	Clay	(Chile) Tomás Barrios Vera	2–6, 1–6

=== Doubles: 6 (2 titles, 4 runner-ups) ===
Legend ATP Challenger Tour (0–0) ITF Futures/World Tennis Tour (2–4)	Finals by surface Hard (1–4) Clay (1–0) Grass (0–0) Carpet (0–0)

Result	W–L	Date	Tournament	Tier	Surface	Partner	Opponents	Score
Win	0–0	Sep 2019	M15 Shymkent, Kazakhstan	World Tennis Tour	Clay	(Russia) Alexander Igoshin	(Kazakhstan) Timur Khabibulin (Ukraine) Vladyslav Manafov	6–4, 6–2
Win	0–0	Oct 2019	M25 Tây Ninh, Vietnam	World Tennis Tour	Hard	(Japan) Rio Noguchi	(United States) Samuel Beren (United Kingdom) Billy Harris	6–7^{(5–7)}, 6–4, [10–4]
Loss	0–0	Nov 2019	M15 Sharm El Sheikh, Egypt	World Tennis Tour	Hard	(Ukraine) Volodymyr Uzhylovskyi	(Poland) Piotr Matuszewski (Poland) Maciej Smoła	2–6, 1–6
Loss	0–0	Feb 2021	M15 Saint Petersburg, Russia	World Tennis Tour	Hard	(Russia) Artem Dubrivnyy	(Czech Republic) Andrew Paulson (Czech Republic) Patrik Rikl	6–3, 6–7^{(5–7)}, [2–10]
Loss	0–0	Apr 2021	M15 Saint Petersburg, Russia	World Tennis Tour	Hard	(Japan) Naoki Tajima	(Moldova) Alexandr Cozbinov (Sweden) Simon Freund	4–6, 5–7
Loss	0–0	Apr 2021	M15 Saint Petersburg, Russia	World Tennis Tour	Hard	(Japan) Naoki Tajima	(Moldova) Alexandr Cozbinov (Sweden) Simon Freund	6–7^{(5–7)}, 6–2, [6–10]
