= 2024 Dutch Open – Doubles =

Doubles
- 2024 Dutch Open

Final
- Champions: (Brazil) Marcelo Demoliner (Argentina) Guillermo Durán
- Runners-up: (United Kingdom) Jay Clarke (United Kingdom) David Stevenson
- Score: 7–6^{(7–2)}, 6–4

Events
Singles	Doubles
- Dutch Open

Manuel Guinard and Grégoire Jacq were the defending champions but chose not to defend their title.

Marcelo Demoliner and Guillermo Durán won the title after defeating Jay Clarke and David Stevenson 7–6^{(7–2)}, 6–4 in the final.

== Seeds ==
1. (Japan) Toshihide Matsui / (Japan) Kaito Uesugi (first round)
2. (United States) George Goldhoff / (United Kingdom) Marcus Willis (first round)
3. (Brazil) Marcelo Demoliner / (Argentina) Guillermo Durán (champions)
4. Ivan Liutarevich / (Argentina) Santiago Rodríguez Taverna (first round)

== Draw ==
Key

- Q = Qualifier
- WC = Wild card
- LL = Lucky loser
- Alt = Alternate
- ITF = ITF entry
- PR = Protected ranking
- SR = Special ranking
- SE = Special exempt
- JE = Junior exempt
- JR = Junior Accelerator Programme entrant
- CO = College Accelerator Programme entrant
- NG = Next Gen Accelerator Program entrant
- w/o = Walkover
- r = Retired
- d = Defaulted

=== Draw ===
First round
1	(Japan) T Matsui (Japan) K Uesugi	3	4
(United Kingdom) J Clarke (United Kingdom) D Stevenson	6	6
(France) C Bittoun Kouzmine (Ukraine) V Uzhylovskyi	3	4
(Spain) Í Cervantes (Spain) D Rincón	6	6
4	I Liutarevich (Argentina) S Rodríguez Taverna	6	5	[5]
(Uruguay) I Carou (Argentina) JM Cerúndolo	4	7	[10]
WC	(Netherlands) Ryan Nijboer (Netherlands) N Visker	6	6
PR	(Australia) B Bayldon (Netherlands) M Hermans	4	3
(Pakistan) A-u-H Qureshi (Spain) D Vega Hernández	5	4
(United Kingdom) S Duncan (United States) H Reese	7	6
WC	(Netherlands) Brian Bozemoj (Netherlands) Stijn Paardekooper	4	6^{4}
3	(Brazil) M Demoliner (Argentina) G Durán	6	7^{7}
(Austria) D Pichler (Austria) J Rodionov	6	4	[10]
(Romania) GA Boitan (Romania) A Jecan	2	6	[6]
(Ecuador) Á Guillén Meza (Paraguay) AD Vallejo	6	7^{7}
2	(United States) G Goldhoff (United Kingdom) M Willis	4	6^{3}

Quarterfinals
(United Kingdom) J Clarke (United Kingdom) D Stevenson	6	7
(Spain) Í Cervantes (Spain) D Rincón	3	5
(Uruguay) I Carou (Argentina) JM Cerúndolo	3	2
WC	(Netherlands) R Nijboer (Netherlands) N Visker	6	6
(United Kingdom) S Duncan (United States) H Reese	5	7^{7}	[9]
3	(Brazil) M Demoliner (Argentina) G Durán	7	6^{4}	[11]
(Austria) D Pichler (Austria) J Rodionov	6	6
(Ecuador) Á Guillén Meza (Paraguay) AD Vallejo	2	0

Semifinals
(United Kingdom) J Clarke (United Kingdom) D Stevenson	7	6
WC	(Netherlands) R Nijboer (Netherlands) N Visker	5	4
3	(Brazil) M Demoliner (Argentina) G Durán	6	6
(Austria) D Pichler (Austria) J Rodionov	3	3

Final
(United Kingdom) J Clarke (United Kingdom) D Stevenson	6^{2}	4
3	(Brazil) M Demoliner (Argentina) G Durán	7^{7}	6
