= 2024 Dutch Open =

- Date: 15 – 21 July
- Surface: Clay / outdoor
- Location: Amersfoort, Netherlands

Champions

Singles
- (Chile) Tomás Barrios Vera

Doubles
- (Brazil) Marcelo Demoliner / (Argentina) Guillermo Durán
- Dutch Open

The 2024 Dutch Open, also known by its sponsored name Van Mossel Kia Dutch Open, was a professional tennis tournament played on clay courts. It was the fifth edition of the Challenger tournament which was part of the 2024 ATP Challenger Tour. It took place in Amersfoort, Netherlands between 15 and 21 July 2024.

== Singles main draw entrants ==
=== Seeds ===
Country	Player	Rank^{1}	Seed
ARG	Juan Manuel Cerúndolo	139	1
AUT	Jurij Rodionov	152	2
LIB	Benjamin Hassan	154	3
FRA	Matteo Martineau	170	4
BOL	Hugo Dellien	171	5
HUN	Zsombor Piros	181	6
BEL	Joris De Loore	191	7
POL	Kamil Majchrzak	192	8

- ^{1} Rankings are as of 1 July 2024.

=== Other entrants ===
The following players received wildcards into the singles main draw:

- (Netherlands) Alec Deckers
- (Netherlands) Guy den Ouden
- (Netherlands) Max Houkes

The following player received entry into the singles main draw as a special exempt:

- (Bolivia) Hugo Dellien

The following player received entry into the singles main draw as an alternate:

- (Ecuador) Álvaro Guillén Meza

The following players received entry from the qualifying draw:

- (France) Mathys Erhard
- (Brazil) Matheus Pucinelli de Almeida
- (Argentina) Santiago Rodríguez Taverna
- (Netherlands) Jelle Sels
- (Netherlands) Deney Wassermann
- Alexey Zakharov

The following player received entry as a lucky loser:

- (Denmark) Elmer Møller

== Champions ==
=== Singles ===
- (Chile) Tomás Barrios Vera def. Alexey Zakharov 6–2, 6–1.

=== Doubles ===
- (Brazil) Marcelo Demoliner / (Argentina) Guillermo Durán def. (United Kingdom) Jay Clarke / (United Kingdom) David Stevenson 7–6^{(7–2)}, 6–4.
