= 2024 Dutch Open – Singles =

Singles
- 2024 Dutch Open

Final
- Champion: (Chile) Tomás Barrios Vera
- Runner-up: Alexey Zakharov
- Score: 6–2, 6–1

Events
Singles	Doubles
← 2023 ·	Dutch Open	· 2025 →

Maximilian Marterer was the defending champion but chose not to defend his title.

Tomás Barrios Vera won the title after defeating Alexey Zakharov 6–2, 6–1 in the final.

== Seeds ==
1. (Argentina) Juan Manuel Cerúndolo (second round)
2. (Austria) Jurij Rodionov (first round)
3. (Lebanon) Benjamin Hassan (first round)
4. (France) Matteo Martineau (first round)
5. (Bolivia) Hugo Dellien (first round)
6. (Hungary) Zsombor Piros (second round)
7. (Belgium) Joris De Loore (first round)
8. (Poland) Kamil Majchrzak (first round, retired)

== Draw ==
=== Key ===
- Q = Qualifier
- WC = Wild card
- LL = Lucky loser
- Alt = Alternate
- SE = Special exempt
- PR = Protected ranking
- ITF = ITF entry
- JE = Junior exempt
- w/o = Walkover
- r = Retired
- d = Defaulted
- SR = Special ranking

=== Finals ===
Semifinals
(Spain) Daniel Rincón	4	4
Q	Alexey Zakharov	6	6
WC	(Netherlands) Max Houkes	7^{7}	4	1
(Chile) Tomás Barrios Vera	6^{4}	6	6

Final
Q	Alexey Zakharov	2	1
(Chile) Tomás Barrios Vera	6	6

=== Top half ===
First round
1	(Argentina) JM Cerúndolo	6	6^{5}	6
(Belgium) A Blockx	4	7^{7}	3
(Italy) F Agamenone	2	2
Alt	(Ecuador) Á Guillén Meza	6	6
(Spain) D Rincón	6	6
Q	(Brazil) M Pucinelli de Almeida	3	3
(Australia) O Jasika	3	4
6	(Hungary) Z Piros	6	6
4	(France) M Martineau	4	3
Q	(Netherlands) Deney Wassermann	6	6
Q	(Netherlands) J Sels	5	6	4
Q	A Zakharov	7	2	6
(Italy) S Travaglia	2	3
(Italy) E Dalla Valle	6	6
(Slovenia) Filip Jeff Planinšek	6	0
8	(Poland) K Majchrzak	4	2^{r}

Second round
1	(Argentina) JM Cerúndolo	6	0	4
Alt	(Ecuador) Á Guillén Meza	4	6	6
(Spain) D Rincón	6	3	6
6	(Hungary) Z Piros	2	6	3
Q	(Netherlands) D Wassermann	6	0	3
Q	A Zakharov	4	6	6
(Italy) E Dalla Valle	6	4	7^{8}
(Slovenia) FJ Planinšek	4	6	6^{6}

Quarterfinals
Alt	(Ecuador) Á Guillén Meza	3	1
(Spain) D Rincón	6	6
Q	A Zakharov	6	6
(Italy) E Dalla Valle	1	3

Semifinals
(Spain) D Rincón	4	4
Q	A Zakharov	6	6

=== Bottom half ===
First round
5/SE	(Bolivia) H Dellien	4	2
(Czech Republic) J Veselý	6	6
(Bolivia) M Dellien	4	7^{8}	6
WC	(Netherlands) Alec Deckers	6	6^{6}	4
WC	(Netherlands) M Houkes	6	6
Q	(Argentina) S Rodríguez Taverna	3	2
LL	(Denmark) E Møller	6	6^{6}	6
3	(Lebanon) B Hassan	0	7^{8}	3
7	(Belgium) J De Loore	3	7^{8}	3
(Spain) B Zapata Miralles	6	6^{6}	6
Q	(France) Mathys Erhard	3	6	3
(Bulgaria) A Andreev	6	3	6
WC	(Netherlands) G den Ouden	6	6
(Italy) F Maestrelli	1	4
(Chile) T Barrios Vera	7^{7}	6
2	(Austria) J Rodionov	6^{1}	1

Second round
(Czech Republic) J Veselý	3	4
(Bolivia) M Dellien	6	6
WC	(Netherlands) M Houkes	7	2	6
LL	(Denmark) E Møller	5	6	2
(Spain) B Zapata Miralles	6	6
(Bulgaria) A Andreev	3	4
WC	(Netherlands) G den Ouden	0	6^{6}
(Chile) T Barrios Vera	6	7^{8}

Quarterfinals
(Bolivia) M Dellien	4	5
WC	(Netherlands) M Houkes	6	7
(Spain) B Zapata Miralles	6^{4}	1
(Chile) T Barrios Vera	7^{7}	6

Semifinals
WC	(Netherlands) M Houkes	7^{7}	4	1
(Chile) T Barrios Vera	6^{4}	6	6
