= 2022 Salvador Challenger =

- Date: 2–8 May
- Edition: 1st
- Surface: Clay
- Location: Salvador, Brazil

Champions

Singles
- (Portugal) João Domingues

Doubles
- (Ecuador) Diego Hidalgo / (Colombia) Cristian Rodríguez
- Salvador Challenger

The 2022 Salvador Challenger was a professional tennis tournament played on clay courts. It was the first edition of the tournament which was part of the 2022 ATP Challenger Tour. It took place in Salvador, Brazil between 2 and 8 May 2022.

== Singles main-draw entrants ==
=== Seeds ===
Country	Player	Rank^{1}	Seed
CHI	Tomás Barrios Vera	147	1
ARG	Renzo Olivo	167	2
~~ARG~~	~~Camilo Ugo Carabelli~~	~~175~~	~~3~~
BRA	Felipe Meligeni Alves	192	4
ARG	Nicolás Kicker	203	5
ARG	Santiago Rodríguez Taverna	207	6
BRA	Matheus Pucinelli de Almeida	218	7
CHI	Gonzalo Lama	256	8

- ^{1} Rankings as of 25 April 2022.

=== Other entrants ===
The following players received wildcards into the singles main draw:

- (Brazil) Gustavo Heide
- (Brazil) João Victor Couto Loureiro
- (Brazil) João Lucas Reis da Silva

The following players received entry into the singles main draw as alternates:

- (Brazil) Mateus Alves
- (Brazil) Gilbert Klier Júnior
- (Spain) Pol Martín Tiffon
- (Colombia) Cristian Rodríguez
- (Argentina) Gonzalo Villanueva

The following players received entry from the qualifying draw:

- (Brazil) Pedro Boscardin Dias
- (Argentina) Román Andrés Burruchaga
- (Argentina) Matías Franco Descotte
- (Peru) Conner Huertas del Pino
- (Brazil) Wilson Leite
- (Argentina) Alejo Lorenzo Lingua Lavallén

The following player received entry as a lucky loser:

- (Argentina) Matías Zukas

== Champions ==
=== Singles ===
- (Portugal) João Domingues def. (Chile) Tomás Barrios Vera 7–6^{(11–9)}, 6–1.

=== Doubles ===
- (Ecuador) Diego Hidalgo / (Colombia) Cristian Rodríguez def. (Brazil) Orlando Luz / (Brazil) Felipe Meligeni Alves 7–5, 6–1.
