= Salvador Challenger =

- 2022 Salvador Challenger

Defunct tennis tournament
- Event name: Salvador Challenger
- Founded: 1979
- Location: Salvador, Bahia, Brazil
- Venue: Costa Verde Tennis Clube
- Category: ATP Challenger Tour
- Surface: Green Clay

The Salvador Challenger was a professional tennis tournament played on clay courts. It was part of the Association of Tennis Professionals (ATP) Challenger Tour. The tournament was first staged in 1979 as the Salvador Open for one season only. It was revived and was held in Salvador, Bahia, Brazil in 2022.

== Past finals ==
=== Singles ===
Year	Champion	Runner-up	Score
2022	(Portugal) João Domingues	(Chile) Tomás Barrios Vera	7–6^{(11–9)}, 6–1
Not held
1979	(Brazil) Carlos Kirmayr	(Brazil) Júlio Góes	6–1, 7–5.

=== Doubles ===
Year	Champions	Runners-up	Score
2022	(Ecuador) Diego Hidalgo (Colombia) Cristian Rodríguez	(Brazil) Orlando Luz (Brazil) Felipe Meligeni Alves	7–5, 6–1
