= 2024 Cali Open =

- Date: 16 – 22 September
- Edition: 3rd
- Surface: Clay
- Location: Cali, Colombia

Champions

Singles
- (Argentina) Juan Pablo Ficovich

Doubles
- (Canada) Juan Carlos Aguilar / (Peru) Conner Huertas del Pino
- Cali Open

The 2024 Kia Open Cali was a professional tennis tournament played on clay courts. It was the third edition of the tournament which was part of the 2024 ATP Challenger Tour. It took place in Cali, Colombia between 16 and 22 September 2024.

== Singles main draw entrants ==
=== Seeds ===
Country	Player	Rank^{1}	Seed
ARG	Thiago Agustín Tirante	97	1
BOL	Hugo Dellien	107	2
ARG	Román Andrés Burruchaga	125	3
BOL	Murkel Dellien	183	4
ARG	Juan Manuel Cerúndolo	185	5
ARG	Facundo Mena	190	6
FRA	Enzo Couacaud	211	7
ARG	Santiago Rodríguez Taverna	226	8

- ^{1} Rankings as of 9 September 2024.

=== Other entrants ===
The following players received wildcards into the singles main draw:

- (Colombia) Frazier Rengifo
- (Colombia) Johan Alexander Rodríguez
- (Greece) Pavlos Tsitsipas

The following players received entry into the singles main draw as alternates:

- (Argentina) Valerio Aboian
- (Argentina) Luciano Emanuel Ambrogi
- (Brazil) Orlando Luz
- (Brazil) José Pereira

The following players received entry from the qualifying draw:

- (Canada) Juan Carlos Aguilar
- (Dominican Republic) Peter Bertran
- (Colombia) Juan Sebastián Gómez
- (Colombia) Samuel Heredia
- (Brazil) Wilson Leite
- (Argentina) Juan Ignacio Londero

== Champions ==
=== Singles ===
- (Argentina) Juan Pablo Ficovich def. (Peru) Gonzalo Bueno 6–1, 6–4.

=== Doubles ===
- (Canada) Juan Carlos Aguilar / (Peru) Conner Huertas del Pino def. (Colombia) Juan Sebastián Gómez / (Colombia) Johan Alexander Rodríguez 5–7, 6–3, [10–7].
