= 2025 Cali Open =

- Date: 6 – 12 October
- Edition: 4th
- Surface: Clay
- Location: Cali, Colombia

Champions

Singles
- (Chile) Tomás Barrios Vera

Doubles
- (Argentina) Federico Agustín Gómez / (Venezuela) Luis David Martínez
- Cali Open

The 2025 Cali Open was a professional tennis tournament played on clay courts. It was the fourth edition of the tournament which was part of the 2025 ATP Challenger Tour. It took place in Cali, Colombia between 6 and 12 October 2025.

== Singles main draw entrants ==
=== Seeds ===
Country	Player	Rank^{1}	Seed
CHI	Tomás Barrios Vera	137	1
ARG	Juan Pablo Ficovich	147	2
BRA	Thiago Seyboth Wild	162	3
LBN	Hady Habib	175	4
AUT	Lukas Neumayer	177	5
COL	Nicolás Mejía	198	6
MEX	Rodrigo Pacheco Méndez	200	7
ECU	Álvaro Guillén Meza	205	8

- ^{1} Rankings as of 29 September 2025.

=== Other entrants ===
The following players received wildcards into the singles main draw:

- (Colombia) Samuel Heredia
- (Colombia) Samuel Alejandro Linde Palacios
- (Colombia) Miguel Tobón

The following player received entry into the singles main draw as an alternate:

- (Uruguay) Franco Roncadelli

The following players received entry from the qualifying draw:

- (Brazil) Mateus Alves
- (Argentina) Luciano Emanuel Ambrogi
- (Argentina) Guido Iván Justo
- (Argentina) Mariano Kestelboim
- (Argentina) Thiago Agustín Tirante
- (Argentina) Juan Bautista Torres

The following player received entry as a lucky loser:

- (Mexico) Alex Hernández

== Champions ==
=== Singles ===
- (Chile) Tomás Barrios Vera def. (Bolivia) Juan Carlos Prado Ángelo 6–1, 6–4.

=== Doubles ===
- (Argentina) Federico Agustín Gómez / (Venezuela) Luis David Martínez def. (Argentina) Guido Iván Justo / (Uruguay) Franco Roncadelli 6–4, 6–4.
