= Evan Zhu =

American tennis player (born 1998)

- Country (sports): United States
- Born: August 15, 1998 (age 28) Ann Arbor, USA
- Height: 6 ft 1 in (1.85 m)
- Turned pro: 2016
- Plays: Right-handed (two-handed backhand)
- College: UCLA
- Coach: Chris Begg, Shariq Khan, Daniel O'Neill
- Prize money: US $183,856

Singles
- Career record: 0–0
- Career titles: 0
- Highest ranking: No. 271 (March 6, 2023)
- Current ranking: No. 525 (August 31, 2026)

Doubles
- Career record: 0–2
- Career titles: 0
- Highest ranking: No. 371 (August 12, 2019)
- Current ranking: No. 1,160 (August 31, 2026)

Grand Slam doubles results
- US Open: 1R (2018)
- Last updated on: September 1, 2026.

Evan Zhu (born August 15, 1998 in Ann Arbor, Michigan) is an American tennis player. Zhu has a career high ATP singles ranking of No. 271, achieved on March 6, 2023 and a career high ATP doubles ranking of No. 371 achieved on August 12, 2019.

Zhu made his ATP main draw doubles debut at the 2018 Hall of Fame Tennis Championships doubles tournament, where he partnered Martin Redlicki having received a wildcard into the tournament. At UCLA, he and Redlicki were the 2018 NCAA doubles champions, defeating the team of Martin Joyce and Mikael Torpegaard of Ohio State, 6–7 (8), 7–6 (4), 1–0 (9), on May 28, 2018.

His older sister, Amy Zhu, is also a professional tennis player playing on the WTA Tour.

== ATP Challenger and ITF Futures/World Tennis Tour finals ==
=== Singles: 8 (4 titles, 4 runner-ups) ===
Legend ATP Challenger Tour (0–0) ITF Futures/WTT (4–4)	Finals by surface Hard (3–2) Clay (1–2) Grass (0–0) Carpet (0–0)

Result	W–L	Date	Tournament	Tier	Surface	Opponent	Score
Loss	0–1	Sep 2016	USA F28, Claremont	Futures	Hard	(Germany) Sebastian Fanselow	5–7, 7–6^{(7–3)}, 3–6
Loss	0–2	Oct 2017	USA F34, Harlingen	Futures	Hard	(United States) J. J. Wolf	7–6^{(7–1)}, 1–6, 2–6
Win	1–2	Oct 2018	USA F28B, Waco	Futures	Hard	(United States) Roy Smith	6–3, ret.
Loss	1–3	Feb 2022	M15 Naples, USA	WTT	Clay	(Sweden) Jonathan Mridha	2–6, 6–7^{(4–7)}
Loss	1–4	Apr 2022	M15 Sunrise, USA	WTT	Clay	(United States) Sekou Bangoura	4–6, 2–6
Win	2–4	Nov 2024	M15 Guatemala City, Guatemala	WTT	Hard	(Mexico) Rodrigo Pacheco Méndez	6–3, 4–6, 6–4
Win	3–4	Nov 2024	M15 Guatemala City, Guatemala	WTT	Hard	(United States) Tristan McCormick	7–6^{(10–8)}, 6–4
Win	4–4	May 2026	M15 Karuizawa, Japan	WTT	Clay	(Australia) Jake Delaney	2–6, 6–4, 6–2

=== Doubles: 16 (6 titles, 10 runner-ups) ===
Legend ATP Challenger Tour (0–1) ITF Futures/WTT (6–9)	Finals by surface Hard (3–6) Clay (3–4) Grass (0–0) Carpet (0–0)

Result	W–L	Date	Tournament	Tier	Surface	Partner	Opponents	Score
Loss	0–1	Jun 2022	Cali Open, Colombia	Challenger	Clay	(United States) Keegan Smith	(Tunisia) Malek Jaziri (Spain) Adrián Menéndez Maceiras	5–7, 4–6

Result	W–L	Date	Tournament	Tier	Surface	Partner	Opponents	Score
Loss	0–1	Feb 2016	USA F8, Plantation	Futures	Clay	(United States) Michael Zhu	(Brazil) Caio Zampieri (Brazil) Fernando Romboli	walkover
Loss	0–2	Oct 2016	USA F32, Harlingen	Futures	Hard	(United States) John McNally	(United Kingdom) Luke Bambridge (United States) Evan King	4–6, 4–6
Win	1–2	Sep 2017	Tunisia F27, Hammamet	Futures	Clay	(Finland) Harri Heliövaara	(Brazil) Luís Britto (Brazil) Marcelo Zormann	6–1, 6–4
Loss	1–3	Aug 2018	USA F22, Edwardsville	Futures	Hard	(United States) Nicolas Meister	(Italy) Liam Caruana (Peru) Nicolás Álvarez	7–6^{(8–6)}, 6–7^{(3–7)}, [7–10]
Win	2–3	Aug 2018	USA F23, Boston	Futures	Hard	(United States) Martin Redlicki	(United States) Felix Corwin (United States) Paul Oosterbaan	7–5, 6–7^{(13–15)}, [10–1]
Win	3–3	Mar 2019	M25 Bakersfield, USA	WTT	Hard	(United States) Martin Redlicki	(United States) Ian Dempster (United States) Jacob Dunbar	6–1, 3–6, [10–7]
Loss	3–4	May 2019	M15 Cancún, Mexico	WTT	Hard	(Antigua and Barbuda) Jody Maginley	(United States) Austin Rapp (United States) George Goldhoff	3–6, 1–6
Loss	3–5	Jun 2019	M25 Tulsa, USA	WTT	Hard	(United States) Martin Redlicki	(United States) Maxime Cressy (Portugal) Bernardo Saraiva	2–6, 6–3, [8–10]
Loss	3–6	Mar 2021	M15 Monastir, Tunisia	WTT	Hard	(Japan) Kazuma Kawachi	(Romania) Vladislav Melnic (Northern Mariana Islands) Colin Sinclair	3–6, 6–4, [6–10]
Win	4–6	Jan 2022	M15 Cancún, Mexico	WTT	Hard	(United States) Ezekiel Clark	(Sweden) Filip Bergevi (Netherlands) Mick Veldheer	7–5, 6–4
Loss	4–7	Feb 2022	M15 Naples, USA	WTT	Clay	(United States) Ezekiel Clark	(United Kingdom) Blu Baker (United States) Jesse Witten	7–6^{(7–4)}, 4–6, [11–13]
Win	5–7	Feb 2022	M15 Naples, USA	WTT	Clay	(United States) Ezekiel Clark	(United Kingdom) Blu Baker (United States) Jesse Witten	3–6, 6–3, [10–8]
Loss	5–8	Aug 2023	M25 Anning, China	WTT	Clay	(China) Sun Fajing	(China) Cui Jie (China) Wang Xiaofei	6–3, 2–6, [8–10]
Win	6–8	May 2024	M25 Baotou, China	WTT	Clay (i)	(China) Te Rigele	(China) Cui Jie (China) Sun Fajing	6–3, 2–6, [10–6]
Loss	6–9	Oct 2024	M25 Louisville, USA	WTT	Hard	(Antigua and Barbuda) Jody Maginley	(United States) J. J. Mercer (United Kingdom) Johannus Monday	5–7, 4–6
