= Miljan Zekić =

Serbian tennis player (born 1988)

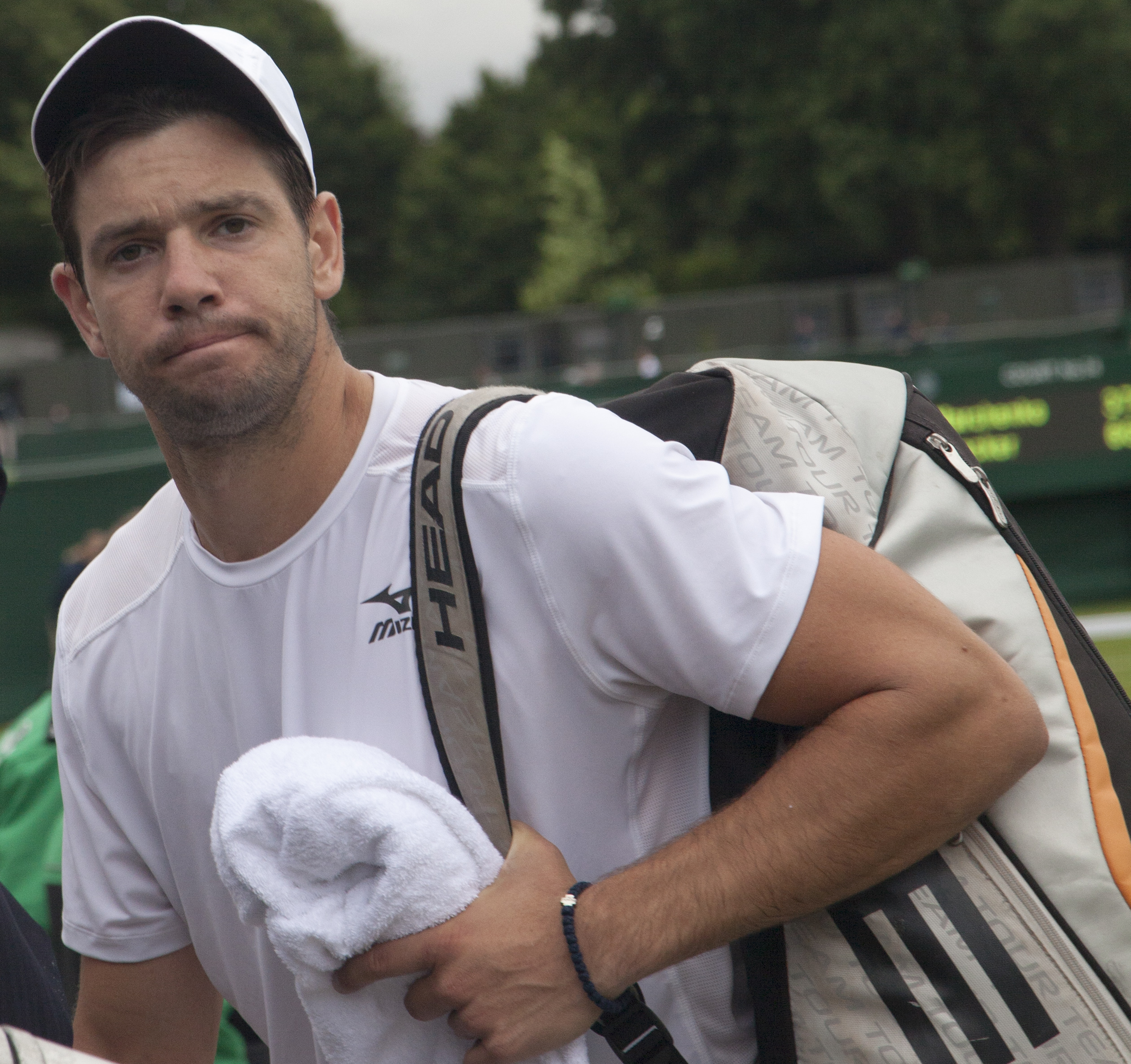
- Zekić in 2017
- Country (sports): Serbia
- Residence: Belgrade, Serbia
- Born: 12 July 1988 (age 38) Belgrade, SR Serbia, SFR Yugoslavia
- Height: 1.85 m (6 ft 1 in)
- Turned pro: 2006
- Plays: Right handed (two–handed backhand)
- Coach: Slobodan Vojinović
- Prize money: US $417,199

Singles
- Career record: 1–2 (ATP Tour level, Grand Slam level, and Davis Cup)
- Career titles: 0
- Highest ranking: No. 188 (11 July 2016)
- Current ranking: —

Grand Slam singles results
- Australian Open: Q2 (2017)
- French Open: Q1 (2016, 2017)
- Wimbledon: Q2 (2017)
- US Open: Q2 (2016)

Doubles
- Career record: 0–2 (ATP Tour level, Grand Slam level, and Davis Cup)
- Career titles: 0
- Highest ranking: No. 269 (8 July 2013)
- Current ranking: No. 2,444 (13 July 2026)

Team competitions
- Davis Cup: 0–1 (Sin. 0–0, Dbs. 0–1)
- Last updated on: 15 July 2026.

Miljan Zekić (Serbian Cyrillic: Миљан Зекић, pronounced [mǐʎan zěːkitɕ]; born 12 July 1988) is a Serbian tennis player. On 11 July 2016, Zekic reached his best singles ranking of world No. 188, while on 8 July 2013, he peaked at No. 269 in the doubles rankings.

== Career ==
Zekić made his ATP main draw debut in doubles with compatriot David Savić as a wildcard pair at the 2011 Serbia Open, losing in the first round to top-seeded pair Zimonjić/Granollers. In July 2016 he won his first trophy on the ATP Challenger Tour winning Internazionali di Tennis dell'Umbria in Todi.

Zekić made his ATP main draw debut in singles as a qualifier at 2017 Croatia Open Umag, losing to Radu Albot in the first round. In two weeks' time, he played in another ATP tournament, 2017 Generali Open Kitzbühel, defeating top seed Alessandro Giannessi and eighth seed Stefanos Tsitsipas in the qualifying rounds, and earned his first ATP main draw victory by defeating world No. 66 Andrey Kuznetsov, before losing to second seed and world No. 25 Fabio Fognini in the second round.

Zekić was a fifth (reserve) player on a Serbian Davis Cup team in the semifinal against France in the 2017 Davis Cup and didn't play in any match. The following year he made his Davis Cup debut, partnered with another debutant, Nikola Milojević, in a doubles match against USA losing 7–6^{(3)}, 2–6, 5–7, 4–6 in the first round.

== Performance timeline ==
Key
| W | F | SF | QF | #R | RR | Q# | DNQ | A | NH |

(W) winner; (F) finalist; (SF) semifinalist; (QF) quarterfinalist; (#R) rounds 4, 3, 2, 1; (RR) round-robin stage; (Q#) qualification round; (DNQ) did not qualify; (A) absent; (NH) not held; (SR) strike rate (events won / competed); (W–L) win–loss record.
To avoid confusion and double counting, these charts are updated at the conclusion of a tournament or when the player's participation has ended.

=== Singles ===
| Tournament | 2016 | 2017 | 2018 | 2019 | 2020 | 2021 | 2022 | 2023 | 2024 | SR | W–L | Win % |
|---|---|---|---|---|---|---|---|---|---|---|---|---|
Grand Slam tournaments
| Australian Open | A | Q2 | A | A | A | A | A | Q1 | A | 0 / 0 | 0–0 | – |
| French Open | Q1 | Q1 | A | A | A | A | A | A | | 0 / 0 | 0–0 | – |
| Wimbledon | A | Q2 | A | A | NH | A | Q1 | A | | 0 / 0 | 0–0 | – |
| US Open | Q2 | A | A | A | A | A | A | A | | 0 / 0 | 0–0 | – |
| Win–loss | 0–0 | 0–0 | 0–0 | 0–0 | 0–0 | 0–0 | 0–0 | 0–0 | 0–0 | 0 / 0 | 0–0 | – |

== ATP Challenger and ITF Futures finals ==
=== Singles: 46 (27–19) ===
| Legend ATP Challenger (1–3) ITF Futures (26–16) | Finals by surface Hard (0–0) Clay (27–19) Grass (0–0) |

| Result | W–L | Date | Tournament | Tier | Surface | Opponent | Score |
|---|---|---|---|---|---|---|---|
| Loss | 0–1 | Aug 2010 | Serbia F6, Sombor | Futures | Clay | (Serbia) Ivan Bjelica | 3–6, 2–6 |
| Win | 1–1 | Oct 2010 | Egypt F5, Cairo | Futures | Clay | (Serbia) Dušan Lajović | 6–1, 3–6, 6–4 |
| Win | 2–1 | Mar 2011 | Turkey F10, Antalya | Futures | Clay | (Sweden) Patrik Brydolf | 6–4, 6–3 |
| Win | 3–1 | May 2011 | Bosnia & Herzegovina F2, Sarajevo | Futures | Clay | (Bosnia and Herzegovina) Tomislav Brkić | 7–6^{(7–1)}, 6–2 |
| Loss | 3–2 | Jun 2011 | France F9, Toulon | Futures | Clay | (France) Gianni Mina | 6–7^{(4–7)}, 4–6 |
| Win | 4–2 | Jul 2011 | France F11, Bourg-en-Bresse | Futures | Clay | (Belgium) Alexandre Folie | 6–3, 6–4 |
| Loss | 4–3 | Jul 2012 | Turkey F26, İzmir | Futures | Clay | (Spain) Sergio Gutiérrez Ferrol | 1–6, 4–6 |
| Win | 5–3 | Jul 2012 | Turkey F27, İzmir | Futures | Clay | (France) Romain Arneodo | 7–5, 6–1 |
| Loss | 5–4 | Aug 2012 | Serbia F9, Novi Sad | Futures | Clay | (Spain) Carlos Gómez-Herrera | 2–6, 2–6 |
| Win | 6–4 | Sep 2012 | Serbia F13, Nis | Futures | Clay | (Bulgaria) Tihomir Grozdanov | 5–7, 6–1, 6–1 |
| Loss | 6–5 | May 2013 | Bulgaria F1, Plovdiv | Futures | Clay | (Bosnia and Herzegovina) Damir Džumhur | 3–6, 3–6 |
| Win | 7–5 | Jun 2013 | Serbia F1, Belgrade | Futures | Clay | (Serbia) Danilo Petrovic | 7–6^{(7–3)}, 6–2 |
| Win | 8–5 | Jun 2013 | Serbia F2, Belgrade | Futures | Clay | (Serbia) Danilo Petrovic | 6–1, 7–5 |
| Win | 9–5 | Jun 2014 | Serbia F2, Belgrade | Futures | Clay | (Germany) Yannick Maden | 7–5, 6–3 |
| Loss | 9–6 | Aug 2014 | Serbia F7, Sombor | Futures | Clay | (Serbia) Marko Tepavac | 3–6, 6–7^{(5–7)} |
| Win | 10–6 | Aug 2014 | Serbia F11, Zlatibor | Futures | Clay | (Serbia) Danilo Petrovic | 6–4, 6–2 |
| Loss | 10–7 | Feb 2015 | Sri Lanka F2, Colombo | Futures | Clay | (Portugal) Rui Machado | 2–6, 1–6 |
| Loss | 10–8 | Feb 2015 | Sri Lanka F3, Colombo | Futures | Clay | (Portugal) Rui Machado | 0–6, 3–6 |
| Win | 11–8 | May 2015 | Croatia F9, Bol | Futures | Clay | (Belgium) Yannick Mertens | 6–7^{(4–7)}, 7–5, 6–2 |
| Win | 12–8 | Jun 2015 | Serbia F3, Šabac | Futures | Clay | (Czech Republic) Robin Stanek | 2–6, 6–4, 6–1 |
| Win | 13–8 | Jan 2016 | Tunisia F2, Hammamet | Futures | Clay | (Portugal) Pedro Sousa | 6–3, 6–3 |
| Win | 14–8 | Feb 2016 | China F1, Anning | Futures | Clay | (Spain) Enrique López Pérez | 6–4, 6–4 |
| Loss | 14–9 | Feb 2016 | China F2, Anning | Futures | Clay | (Spain) Enrique López Pérez | 3–6, 3–6 |
| Win | 15–9 | Jul 2016 | Todi, Italy | Challenger | Clay | (Italy) Stefano Napolitano | 6–7^{(6–8)}, 6–4, 6–3 |
| Loss | 15–10 | Sep 2016 | Banja Luka, Bosnia & Herzegovina | Challenger | Clay | (Czech Republic) Adam Pavlásek | 6–3, 1–6, 4–6 |
| Win | 16–10 | Mar 2017 | Tunisia F8, Hammamet | Futures | Clay | (Bosnia and Herzegovina) Tomislav Brkić | 6–7^{(7–9)}, 6–3, 6–4 |
| Win | 17–10 | Dec 2017 | Tunisia F39, Hammamet | Futures | Clay | (Portugal) Gonçalo Oliveira | 4–1 Ret. |
| Win | 18–10 | Dec 2017 | Tunisia F40, Hammamet | Futures | Clay | (Tunisia) Aziz Dougaz | 6–3, 6–2 |
| Win | 19–10 | Feb 2018 | Spain F5, Murcia | Futures | Clay | (Spain) Daniel Gimeno Traver | 6–4, 3–6, 6–3 |
| Win | 20–10 | Aug 2018 | Serbia F1, Novi Sad | Futures | Clay | (Italy) Simone Roncalli | 6–2, 6–4 |
| Win | 21–10 | Sep 2018 | Italy F28, Santa Margherita di Pula, Italy | Futures | Clay | (Italy) Alessandro Petrone | 6–3, 6–3 |
| Loss | 21–11 | Apr 2019 | M25, Santa Margherita di Pula, Italy | World Tennis Tour | Clay | (France) Laurent Lokoli | 7–5, 5–7, 2–6 |
| Win | 22–11 | Dec 2019 | M15 Antalya, Turkey | World Tennis Tour | Clay | (Russia) Pavel Kotov | 3–6, 6–4, 7–6^{(7–4)} |
| Loss | 22–12 | Jan 2020 | M15 Antalya, Turkey | World Tennis Tour | Clay | (Kazakhstan) Timofei Skatov | 3–6, 6–4, 3–6 |
| Win | 23–12 | Nov 2020 | M15 Cairo, Egypt | World Tennis Tour | Clay | (Netherlands) Niels Visker | 6–1, 7–6^{(7–3)} |
| Loss | 23–13 | Feb 2021 | M15 Antalya, Turkey | World Tennis Tour | Clay | (Portugal) Nuno Borges | 4–6, 3–3 Ret. |
| Loss | 23–14 | Mar 2021 | M15 Antalya, Turkey | World Tennis Tour | Clay | (Sweden) Dragoș Nicolae Mădăraș | 6–2, 6–7^{(6–8)}, 5–6 Ret. |
| Loss | 23–15 | Mar 2021 | M15 Antalya, Turkey | World Tennis Tour | Clay | (Brazil) Matheus Pucinelli de Almeida | 4–6, 4–6 |
| Win | 24–15 | Mar 2021 | M15 Antalya, Turkey | World Tennis Tour | Clay | (Brazil) Matheus Pucinelli de Almeida | 6–1, 3–6, 6–4 |
| Win | 25–15 | Mar 2021 | M15 Antalya, Turkey | World Tennis Tour | Clay | (Poland) Daniel Michalski | 7–6^{(8–6)}, 6–3 |
| Win | 26–15 | Jun 2021 | M15 Skopje, North Macedonia | World Tennis Tour | Clay | (Bulgaria) Alexandar Lazarov | 6–4, 7–6^{(7–5)} |
| Loss | 26–16 | Apr 2022 | Barletta, Italy | Challenger | Clay | (Portugal) Nuno Borges | 3-6, 5-7 |
| Loss | 26–17 | Apr 2022 | M25, Santa Margherita di Pula, Italy | World Tennis Tour | Clay | (France) Laurent Lokoli | 2–6, 7–5, 4–6 |
| Loss | 26–18 | Jul 2022 | Cali, Colombia | Challenger | Clay | (Argentina) Facundo Mena | 2-6, 6-7^{(3–7)} |
| Loss | 26–19 | Jul 2023 | M15 Belgrade, Serbia | World Tennis Tour | Clay | (Turkey) Ergi Kırkın | 6–3, 5–7, 3–6 |
| Win | 27–19 | May 2024 | M15 Brčko, Bosnia and Herzegovina | World Tennis Tour | Clay | (Poland) Paweł Juszczak | 2–6, 6–2, 5–1 Ret. |

=== Doubles: 44 (21–23) ===
| Legend ATP Challenger (0–1) ITF Futures (21–22) | Finals by surface Hard (3–0) Clay (18–23) Grass (0–0) |

| Result | W–L | Date | Tournament | Tier | Surface | Partner | Opponents | Score |
|---|---|---|---|---|---|---|---|---|
| Loss | 0–1 | Apr 2007 | Turkey F1, Antalya | Futures | Clay | (Spain) Guillermo Olaso | (Romania) Artemon Apostu-Efremov (Romania) Alexandru Lazar | 6–7^{(3–7)}, 3–6 |
| Win | 1–1 | Jun 2007 | Bulgaria F2, Sofia | Futures | Clay | (Serbia) David Savić | (Bulgaria) Ilia Kushev (Bulgaria) Vasko Mladenov | 6–4, 6–3 |
| Loss | 1–2 | Aug 2007 | Serbia F5, Subotica | Futures | Clay | (Serbia) Ivan Bjelica | (North Macedonia) Lazar Magdinchev (Montenegro) Goran Tošić | 6–3, 1–6, 1–6 |
| Loss | 1–3 | Oct 2007 | Bosnia & Herzegovina F6, Medugorje | Futures | Clay | (Serbia) Ivan Bjelica | (Serbia) David Savić (Slovenia) Tomislav Ternar | 6–2, Ret. |
| Loss | 1–4 | Mar 2008 | Italy F4, Caltanissetta | Futures | Clay | (Serbia) Nikola Ćirić | (Argentina) Juan-Martín Aranguren (Argentina) Juan-Francisco Spina | walkover |
| Loss | 1–5 | May 2008 | Bulgaria F2, Rousse | Futures | Clay | (Belgium) Yannick Mertens | (Romania) Bogdan-Victor Leonte (Russia) Mikhail Vasiliev | 6–7^{(5–7)}, 3–6 |
| Win | 2–5 | May 2008 | Bulgaria F3, Plévin | Futures | Clay | (Belgium) Yannick Mertens | (North Macedonia) Ilija Martinoski (North Macedonia) Predrag Rusevski | 6–4, 3–6, [10–1] |
| Loss | 2–6 | Jun 2008 | Serbia F2, Belgrade | Futures | Clay | (Serbia) David Savić | (Serbia) Nikola Ćaćić (Serbia) Dušan Lajović | 6–7^{(6–8)}, 6–3, [8–10] |
| Loss | 2–7 | Sep 2008 | Bulgaria F8, Stara Zagora | Futures | Clay | (Serbia) Ivan Bjelica | (Bulgaria) Boris Nicola Bakalov (Bulgaria) Vasko Mladenov | 3–6, 4–6 |
| Loss | 2–8 | Sep 2008 | Bosnia & Herzegovina F6, Mostar | Futures | Clay | (Serbia) Ivan Bjelica | (Croatia) Ivan Cerović (Latvia) Deniss Pavlovs | 6–7^{(3–7)}, 2–6 |
| Loss | 2–9 | Feb 2009 | Egypt F3, Cairo | Futures | Clay | (Serbia) David Savić | (Egypt) Karim Maamoun (Egypt) Sherif Sabry | 4–6, 6–1, [7–10] |
| Win | 3–9 | Aug 2009 | Serbia F4, Novi Sad | Futures | Clay | (Serbia) Ivan Bjelica | (Serbia) Vladimir Obradović (Serbia) Aleksander Slovic | 6–3, 6–4 |
| Loss | 3–10 | Apr 2010 | Turkey F5, Antalya | Futures | Clay | (Serbia) Ivan Bjelica | (Spain) Ignacio Coll Riudavets (Spain) Gerard Granollers Pujol | 2–6, 7–5, [7–10] |
| Win | 4–10 | May 2010 | Bosnia & Herzegovina F4, Sarajevo | Futures | Clay | (Serbia) Dušan Lajović | (Bosnia and Herzegovina) Mirza Bašić (Bosnia and Herzegovina) Zlatan Kadric | 6–3, 6–4 |
| Win | 5–10 | May 2010 | Bosnia & Herzegovina F5, Brčko | Futures | Clay | (Serbia) Ivan Bjelica | (Serbia) David Savić (Montenegro) Goran Tošić | 7–6^{(7–4)}, 7–5 |
| Win | 6–10 | Jun 2010 | Bosnia & Herzegovina F7, Kiseljak | Futures | Clay | (Serbia) Arsenije Zlatanovic | (Bosnia and Herzegovina) Jasmin Ademovic (Bosnia and Herzegovina) Sven Lalic | 7–6^{(7–4)}, 4–6, [10–8] |
| Loss | 6–11 | Jul 2010 | Serbia F3, Belgrade | Futures | Clay | (Serbia) Ivan Bjelica | (Serbia) David Savić (Hungary) György Balázs | 1–6, 1–6 |
| Loss | 6–12 | Aug 2010 | Serbia F4, Novi Sad | Futures | Clay | (Serbia) Nikola Bubnic | (Serbia) Boris Conkic (Serbia) Ivan Djurdjevic | 6–4, 2–6, [13–15] |
| Win | 7–12 | Aug 2010 | Serbia F6, Sombor | Futures | Clay | (Serbia) Ivan Bjelica | (Mexico) Javier Herrera-Eguiluz (Australia) Brendan Moore | 6–3, 6-4 |
| Loss | 7–13 | Aug 2010 | Bulgaria F5, Bourgas | Futures | Clay | (North Macedonia) Tomislav Jotovski | (Argentina) Diego Álvarez (Italy) Federico Torresi | 4–6, 2–6 |
| Win | 8–13 | Oct 2010 | Egypt F4, Cairo | Futures | Clay | (Serbia) Dušan Lajović | (Russia) Aleksandr Lobkov (Russia) Alexander Rumyantsev | 7–6^{(7–5)}, 7–6^{(10–8)} |
| Loss | 8–14 | Apr 2011 | Turkey F11, Antalya | Futures | Clay | (Serbia) Ivan Bjelica | (Croatia) Toni Androić (Croatia) Dino Marcan | 5–7, 2–6 |
| Win | 9–14 | May 2011 | Bosnia & Herzegovina F2, Sarajevo | Futures | Clay | (Serbia) Nikola Ćaćić | (Slovenia) Tom Kočevar-Dešman (Slovenia) Rok Jarc | 6–3, 6-4 |
| Loss | 9–15 | Jun 2012 | Italy F11, Cesena | Futures | Clay | (Serbia) Nikola Ćirić | (United States) Nicholas Monroe (Germany) Simon Stadler | 6–4, 3–6, [5–10] |
| Win | 10–15 | Jul 2012 | Turkey F26, İzmir | Futures | Clay | (Germany) Dominik Schulz | (Russia) Sergei Krotiouk (Russia) Mikhail Vasiliev | 6–1, 6-2 |
| Win | 11–15 | Jul 2012 | Turkey F27, İzmir | Futures | Clay | (Germany) Dominik Schulz | (Italy) Nicola Ghedin (Italy) Giovanni Zennaro | 7–6^{(7–4)}, 6-4 |
| Win | 12–15 | Jul 2012 | Italy F19, Fano | Futures | Clay | (Italy) Matteo Volante | (Italy) Stefano Napolitano (Italy) Marco Viola | 6–3, 7–6^{(7–3)} |
| Win | 13–15 | Aug 2012 | Serbia F10, Zlatibor | Futures | Clay | (Serbia) Danilo Petrovic | (Serbia) Miki Janković (Serbia) Peđa Krstin | 6–2, 4–6, [10–7] |
| Win | 14–15 | Feb 2013 | France F3, Feucherolles | Futures | Hard | (Serbia) Nikola Ćaćić | (Netherlands) Stephan Fransen (Netherlands) Wesley Koolhof | 3–6, 7–5, [10–8] |
| Win | 15–15 | Apr 2013 | France F7, Angers | Futures | Clay | (Serbia) Ivan Bjelica | (Belgium) Niels Dusein (Germany) Tim Pütz | 6–3, 6–4 |
| Win | 16–15 | May 2013 | Bulgaria F1, Plovdiv | Futures | Clay | (Bosnia and Herzegovina) Damir Džumhur | (Bulgaria) Dinko Halachev (Bulgaria) Dinko Halachev | 7–5, 6–7^{(4–7)}, [12–10] |
| Loss | 16–16 | Jul 2013 | Timișoara, Romania | Challenger | Clay | (Serbia) Ilija Vucic | (France) Jonathan Eysseric (France) Nicolas Renavand | 7–6^{(8–6)}, 2–6, [7–10] |
| Loss | 16–17 | Nov 2013 | Turkey F45, Antalya | Futures | Clay | (Georgia (country)) Nikoloz Basilashvili | (Germany) Tom Schonenberg (Germany) Matthias Wunner | 0–6, 4–6 |
| Loss | 16–18 | Feb 2014 | Egypt F3, Sharm El Sheikh | Futures | Clay | (Serbia) Arsenije Zlatanovic | (Brazil) Jose Pereira (Italy) Stefano Travaglia | 6–2, 3–6, [8–10] |
| Loss | 16–19 | Jun 2014 | Serbia F1, Belgrade | Futures | Clay | (Serbia) Nikola Ćirić | (Germany) Dominique Maden (Germany) Yannick Maden | 4–6, 6–2, [3–10] |
| Win | 17–19 | Nov 2014 | Greece F10, Heraklion | Futures | Hard | (Serbia) Ivan Bjelica | (Greece) Alexandros Jakupovic (Russia) Markos Kalovelonis | 6–3, 7–6^{(7–4)} |
| Win | 18–19 | Feb 2015 | Sri Lanka F3, Colombo | Futures | Clay | (Serbia) Arsenije Zlatanovic | (United States) Andre Dome (New Zealand) Ben Mclachlin | 6-2, 6-4 |
| Win | 19–19 | Jun 2015 | Serbia F3, Šabac | Futures | Clay | (North Macedonia) Tomislav Jotovski | (France) François-Arthur Vibert (France) Florent Diep | 6–7^{(4–7)}, 6–0, [10–4] |
| Loss | 19–20 | Jan 2016 | Tunisia F2, Hammamet | Futures | Clay | (North Macedonia) Tomislav Jotovski | (Sweden) Markus Eriksson (Italy) Matteo Volante | 2-6, 1-6 |
| Loss | 19–21 | Jan 2018 | Tunisia F1, Hammamet | Futures | Clay | (Japan) Shunsuke Wakita | (Italy) Marko Bartolotti (Italy) Julian Ocieppo | 0-1 Ret. |
| Win | 20–21 | Dec 2019 | M15 Antalya, Turkey | World Tennis Tour | Clay | (Croatia) Duje Ajduković | (Russia) Vladimir Korolev (Russia) Andrey Uvarov | 6-3, 6-3 |
| Win | 21–21 | Nov 2020 | M15 Sharm El Sheikh, Egypt | World Tennis Tour | Hard | (Serbia) Marko Miladinović | (Italy) Alessandro Vega (Cyprus) Petros Chrysochos | 6–4, 6–3 |
| Loss | 21–22 | May 2023 | M25 Kuršumlijska Banja, Serbia | World Tennis Tour | Clay | (Ukraine) Volodymyr Uzhylovskyi | (Netherlands) Guy den Ouden (Italy) Samuel Vincent Ruggeri | 5–7, 2–6 |
| Loss | 21–23 | May 2024 | M15 Brčko, Bosnia and Herzegovina | World Tennis Tour | Clay | (United States) Kabeer Kapasi | (Ukraine) Vladyslav Orlov (Germany) Tim Rühl | 2–6, 1–6 |
