= Cali Open =

Open Cali
- 2025 Cali Open

ATP Challenger Tour
- Event name: Kia Open Cali
- Location: Cali, Colombia
- Venue: Club Campestre Los Farallones de Cali (2022-)
- Category: ATP Challenger Tour
- Surface: Clay
- Prize money: $100,000
- Website: website

The Kia Open Cali is a professional tennis tournament played on clay courts. It is currently part of the Association of Tennis Professionals (ATP) Challenger Tour. It is held in Cali, Colombia, with the first edition played in 2022. The tournament originated as a quick replacement for the 2022 edition of the Quito Challenger, which was moved due to political unrest in Quito. Since 2023 it is branded as the Kia Open.

== Past finals ==
=== Singles ===
Year	Champion	Runner-up	Score
2026	(Brazil) Matheus Pucinelli de Almeida	(Argentina) Valerio Aboian	7–6^{(7–1)}, 6–3
2025	(Chile) Tomás Barrios Vera	(Bolivia) Juan Carlos Prado Ángelo	6–1, 6–4
2024	(Argentina) Juan Pablo Ficovich	(Peru) Gonzalo Bueno	6–1, 6–4
2023	(Argentina) Federico Delbonis	(Argentina) Guido Andreozzi	6–4, 6–7^{(6–8)}, 6–3
2022	(Argentina) Facundo Mena	(Serbia) Miljan Zekić	6–2, 7–6^{(7–3)}

=== Doubles ===
Year	Champions	Runners-up	Score
2026	(Bolivia) Federico Zeballos (Brazil) Marcelo Zormann	(Mexico) Alan Magadán (Mexico) Rodrigo Pacheco Méndez	5–5 ret.
2025	(Argentina) Federico Agustín Gómez (Venezuela) Luis David Martínez	(Argentina) Guido Iván Justo (Uruguay) Franco Roncadelli	6–4, 6–4
2024	(Canada) Juan Carlos Aguilar (Peru) Conner Huertas del Pino	(Colombia) Juan Sebastián Gómez (Colombia) Johan Alexander Rodríguez	5–7, 6–3, [10–7]
2023	(Argentina) Guido Andreozzi (Colombia) Cristian Rodríguez	(Brazil) Orlando Luz (Ukraine) Oleg Prihodko	6–3, 6–4
2022	(Tunisia) Malek Jaziri (Spain) Adrián Menéndez Maceiras	(United States) Keegan Smith (United States) Evan Zhu	7–5, 6–4
