= Tomás Barrios Vera =

Chilean tennis player

- Piros at 2026 Wimbledon Championships
- Full name: Marcelo Tomás Barrios Vera
- Country (sports): Chile
- Residence: Santiago, Chile
- Born: 10 December 1997 (age 28) Chillán, Chile
- Height: 1.91 m (6 ft 3 in)
- Turned pro: 2019
- Plays: Right-handed (two-handed backhand)
- Coach: Guillermo Gómez
- Prize money: US $2,003,697

Singles
- Career record: 11–27
- Career titles: 0
- Highest ranking: No. 93 (15 January 2024)
- Current ranking: No. 203 (16 November 2026)

Grand Slam singles results
- Australian Open: 1R (2022)
- French Open: Q2 (2021, 2022, 2023, 2025, 2026)
- Wimbledon: 2R (2023)
- US Open: 1R (2026)

Other tournaments
- Olympic Games: 1R (2021, 2024)

Doubles
- Career record: 20–18
- Career titles: 1
- Highest ranking: No. 217 (7 February 2022)
Medal record
Men's tennis
Representing Chile
Pan American Games
Silver medal – second place	2019 Lima	Singles
Silver medal – second place	2023 Santiago	Singles
Silver medal – second place	2023 Santiago	Doubles
South American Games
Gold medal – first place	2018 Cochabamba	Singles
- Last updated on: 17 November 2026.

Marcelo Tomás Barrios Vera (Latin American Spanish: [maɾˈselo toˈmas ˈβarjos ˈβeɾa]; (Note: In isolation, Vera is pronounced [ˈbeɾa].) born 10 December 1997), also known as Tomás Barrios, is a Chilean professional tennis player. He has a career-high ATP singles ranking of world No. 93 achieved on 15 January 2024 and a doubles ranking of No. 217 reached on 28 February 2022. He is currently the No. 3 singles player from Chile.

Barrios Vera has won an ATP Tour doubles title at the 2024 Chile Open, with countryman Alejandro Tabilo. He represents Chile in the Davis Cup.

== Professional career ==
=== 2021: Major and Olympics debuts, top 150, Challenger title ===
Barrios Vera reached his first challenger final in homesoil, at the Santiago challenger, but lost to Sebastián Báez.

He reached the final of the 2021 Almaty Challenger II losing to Jesper De Jong, which resulted in a career high of No. 210 on 21 June 2021. In the following week, Barrios qualified for his first Grand Slam at the 2021 Wimbledon Championships, where he lost to former finalist Kevin Anderson in the first round. As a result, he entered the top 200 reaching a career-high ranking of No. 194 on 12 July 2021.

Barrios Vera qualified to represent Chile at the 2020 Summer Olympics. He lost in the first round to Jérémy Chardy.

In the following month, he won his first Challenger title in Meerbusch, Germany, defeating Juan Manuel Cerúndolo in two sets at the final. The next day, he reached a new career-high ranking of No. 172 on 16 August 2021.

Barrios Vera finished the 2021 season ranked No. 147 in the singles rankings.

=== 2022–2023: First ATP Tour quarterfinal and major win ===
Barrios Vera reached the quarterfinals at the 2023 Córdoba Open as a wildcard defeating Daniel Galan and eight seed Bernabé Zapata Miralles. Later in the year, he clinched his second and third Challenger titles by winning the 2023 San Luis Open Challenger, defeating Dominik Koepfer in straight sets, and the 2023 Florianópolis Challenger defeating Alejandro Tabilo in straight sets.

After qualifying for the main draw, he won his first major match against Sebastián Báez at the 2023 Wimbledon Championships, before losing to David Goffin in the second round.

=== 2024–2026: United Cup, top 100, Masters debut and first win ===
Barrios Vera made his debut at the 2024 United Cup in mixed-doubles, partnering Daniela Seguel, where they stunned Greek top 10 duo Maria Sakkari and Stefanos Tsitsipas. He reached the top 100 at world No. 95 in the singles rankings on 8 January 2024. Barrios Vera won his fifth Challenger title in Campinas and returned to No. 128 in the rankings on 7 April 2025.

Barrios Vera made his Masters 1000 debut at the 2025 Italian Open after qualifying for the main draw but lost to Jaume Munar in the first round.

He qualified for the main draw and then recorded his first Masters win at the Canadian Open defeating Gaël Monfils in the first round, saving four match points.

Barrios Vera won his sixth Challenger in Cali in October 2025, and his seventh in Lima in November. En route to the Lima title, he made Challenger history in the semifinals by winning the longest three-set match in the history of the ATP Challenger Tour which lasted 4 hours and 24 minutes.

He entered the main draw at the 2026 Rio Open as a lucky loser but lost to Matteo Berrettini.

== Performance timelines ==
Key
W	F	SF	QF	#R	RR	Q#	DNQ	A	NH

(W) winner; (F) finalist; (SF) semifinalist; (QF) quarterfinalist; (#R) rounds 4, 3, 2, 1; (RR) round-robin stage; (Q#) qualification round; (DNQ) did not qualify; (A) absent; (NH) not held; (SR) strike rate (events won / competed); (W–L) win–loss record.

=== Singles ===
Tournament	2017	2018	2019	2020	2021	2022	2023	2024	2025	2026	SR	W–L	Win %
Grand Slam tournaments
Australian Open	A	A	A	A	A	1R	Q2	Q1	Q2	Q2	0 / 1	0–1	0%
French Open	A	A	A	A	Q2	Q2	Q2	Q1	Q2		0 / 0	0–0	–
Wimbledon	A	A	A	NH	1R	Q1	2R	Q2	Q3		0 / 2	1–2	33%
US Open	A	A	A	A	Q1	A	Q1	Q1	Q1		0 / 0	0–0	–
Win–loss	0–0	0–0	0–0	0–0	0–1	0–1	1–1	0–0	0–0	0–0	0 / 3	1–3	25%
ATP Masters 1000
Indian Wells Masters	A	A	A	NH	A	A	A	A	A	Q2	0 / 0	0–0	–
Miami Open	A	A	A	NH	A	A	A	A	A		0 / 0	0–0	–
Monte-Carlo Masters	A	A	A	NH	A	A	A	A	A		0 / 0	0–0	–
Madrid Open	A	A	A	NH	A	A	A	A	A		0 / 0	0–0	–
Rome Masters	A	A	A	A	A	A	Q2	A	1R		0 / 1	0–1	0%
Canadian Open	A	A	A	NH	A	A	A	A	2R		0 / 1	1–1	50%
Cincinnati Masters	A	A	A	A	A	A	A	A	A		0 / 0	0–0	–
Shanghai Masters	A	A	A	NH			A	A	A		0 / 0	0–0	–
Paris Masters	A	A	A	A	A	A	A	A	A		0 / 0	0–0	–
Win–loss	0–0	0–0	0–0	0–0	0–0	0–0	0–0	0–0	1–2	0–0	0 / 2	1–2	33%
National representation
Davis Cup	Z1	A	A	WG1							0 / 0	1–1	–
Career statistics
	2017	2018	2019	2020	2021	2022	2023	2024	2025	2026	Total		
Tournaments	0	0	0	1	3	1	4				9		
Titles / Finals	0 / 0	0 / 0	0 / 0	0 / 0	0 / 0	0 / 0	0 / 0				0 / 0		
Overall win–loss	1–0	0–0	0–0	1–2	0–3	1–1	3–4	2–7	2–5		9–22		
Year-end ranking	563	345	322	254	147	230	103	154	109		29%		

=== Doubles ===
Tournament	2019	2020	2021	2022	2023	2024	SR	W–L
Grand Slam tournaments
Australian Open	A	A	A	A	A	A	0 / 0	0–0
French Open	A	A	A	A	A		0 / 0	0–0
Wimbledon	A	NH	A	A	A		0 / 0	0–0
US Open	A	A	A	A	A		0 / 0	0–0
Win–loss	0–0	0–0	0–0	0–0	0–0	0–0	0 / 0	0–0
National representation
Davis Cup	RR	QR	WG1				0 / 1	0–5
ATP Cup	NH	A	A	RR	NH		0 / 1	2–1
Career statistics
	2019	2020	2021	2022	2023	2024	Career	
Tournaments	0	1	1	2	3	3	10	
Titles / Finals	0 / 0	0 / 0	0 / 0	0 / 0	0 / 0	1 / 1	1 / 1	
Overall win–loss	0–2	2–2	1–2	3–2	4–2	4–2	14–12	
Year-end ranking	518	275	264	336	725		54%	

== ATP Tour finals ==
=== Doubles: 1 (title) ===
Legend Grand Slam (–) ATP 1000 (–) ATP 500 (–) ATP 250 (1–0)	Finals by surface Hard (–) Clay (1–0) Grass (–)	Finals by setting Outdoor (1–0) Indoor (–)

Result	W–L	Date	Tournament	Tier	Surface	Partner	Opponents	Score
Win	1–0	Mar 2024	Chile Open, Chile	ATP 250	Clay	(Chile) Alejandro Tabilo	(Brazil) Orlando Luz (Chile) Matías Soto	6–2, 6–4

== ATP Challenger Tour finals ==
=== Singles: 17 (7 titles, 10 runner-ups) ===
Finals by surface
Hard (0–0)
Clay (7–10)

Result	W–L	Date	Tournament	Tier	Surface	Opponent	Score
Loss	0–1	Mar 2021	Santiago Challenger, Chile	Challenger	Clay	(Argentina) Sebastián Báez	3–6, 6–7 ^{(4–7)}
Loss	0–2	Jun 2021	Almaty Challenger II, Kazakhstan	Challenger	Clay	(Netherlands) Jesper de Jong	1–6, 2–6
Win	1–2	Aug 2021	Meerbusch Challenger, Germany	Challenger	Clay	(Argentina) Juan Manuel Cerúndolo	7–6^{(9–7)}, 6–3
Loss	1–3	May 2022	Salvador Challenger, Brazil	Challenger	Clay	(Portugal) João Domingues	6–7^{(9–11)}, 1–6
Loss	1–4	May 2022	Poznań Open, Poland	Challenger	Clay	(France) Arthur Rinderknech	3–6, 6–7^{(2–7)}
Loss	1–5	Jan 2023	Brasil Tennis Challenger, Brazil	Challenger	Clay	(Argentina) Andrea Collarini	2–6, 6–7^{(1–7)}
Win	2–5	Apr 2023	San Luis Potosí Open, Mexico	Challenger	Clay	(Germany) Dominik Koepfer	7–6^{(8–6)}, 7–5
Win	3–5	Apr 2023	Florianópolis Challenger, Brazil	Challenger	Clay	(Chile) Alejandro Tabilo	6–4, 6–4
Loss	3–6	Jun 2023	Poznań Open, Poland	Challenger	Clay	(Argentina) Mariano Navone	5–7, 3–6
Loss	3–7	Jul 2024	Internazionali Città di Trieste, Italy	Challenger	Clay	(Argentina) Federico Agustín Gómez	1–6, 2–6
Win	4–7	Jul 2024	Dutch Open, Netherlands	Challenger	Clay	Alexey Zakharov	6–2, 6–1
Loss	4–8	Oct 2024	Challenger de Guayaquil, Ecuador	Challenger	Clay	(Argentina) Federico Agustín Gómez	1–6, 4–6
Loss	4–9	Jan 2025	Punta Open, Uruguay	Challenger	Clay	(Colombia) Daniel Elahi Galán	7–5, 4–6, 4–6
Win	5–9	Apr 2025	Internacional de Campinas, Brazil	Challenger	Clay	(Ecuador) Álvaro Guillén Meza	6–4, 6–3
Loss	5–10	Apr 2025	Danube Upper Austria Open, Austria	Challenger	Clay	(Chile) Cristian Garín	6–3, 1–6, 4–6
Win	6–10	Oct 2025	Cali Open, Colombia	Challenger	Clay	(Bolivia) Juan Carlos Prado Ángelo	6–1, 6–4
Win	7–10	Nov 2025	IGMA Open, Peru	Challenger	Clay	(Brazil) João Lucas Reis da Silva	7–6^{(7–5)}, 7–6^{(7–3)}

=== Doubles: 3 (1 title, 2 runner-ups) ===
Result	W–L	Date	Tournament	Tier	Surface	Partner	Opponents	Score
Win	1–0	Mar 2017	Cachantún Cup, Chile	Challenger	Clay	(Chile) Nicolás Jarry	(Argentina) Máximo González (Argentina) Andrés Molteni	6–4, 6–3
Loss	1–1	Oct 2021	Lima Challenger II, Peru	Challenger	Clay	(Chile) Alejandro Tabilo	(Peru) Sergio Galdós (Portugal) Gonçalo Oliveira	2–6, 6–2, [5–10]
Loss	1–2	Oct 2024	Internacional de Campinas, Brazil	Challenger	Clay	(Argentina) Facundo Mena	(Brazil) Orlando Luz (Brazil) Mateus Alves	3–6, 4–6

== ITF Tour finals ==
=== Singles: 13 (7 titles, 6 runner-ups) ===
Finals by surface
Hard (2–4)
Clay (5–2)

Result	W–L	Date	Tournament	Tier	Surface	Opponent	Score
Loss	0–1	Nov 2015	Colombia F9, Valledupar	Futures	Hard	(Mexico) Tigre Hank	5–7, 0–6
Win	1–1	May 2016	Mexico F2, Pachuca	Futures	Hard	(Barbados) Darian King	6–1, 7–6 ^{(7–3)}
Win	2–1	Oct 2016	Colombia F4, Valledupar	Futures	Hard	(Colombia) Daniel Elahi Galán	4–6, 6–3, 7–6 ^{(7–5)}
Loss	2–2	Mar 2017	Greece F3, Heraklion	Futures	Clay	(Czech Republic) Marek Jaloviec	2–6, 5–7
Win	3–2	Dec 2017	Chile F3, Antofagasta	Futures	Clay	(Chile) Alejandro Tabilo	5–7, 7–6 ^{(7–5)}, 6–2
Win	4–2	Jan 2018	US F5, Weston	Futures	Clay	(Portugal) Fred Gil	6–2, 6–0
Loss	4–3	Mar 2018	Greece F3, Heraklion	Futures	Hard	(Serbia) Marko Tepavac	3–6, 5–7
Loss	4–4	Mar 2018	Greece F4, Heraklion	Futures	Hard	(Germany) Stefan Seifert	7–6 ^{(7–4)}, 2–6, 2–6
Loss	4–5	Apr 2018	Greece F5, Heraklion	Futures	Hard	(France) Yannick Jankovits	4–6, 3–6
Win	5–5	Apr 2018	US F11, Orange Park	Futures	Clay	(United States) Noah Rubin	6–4, 6–3
Win	6–5	Aug 2019	M25 Portoviejo, Ecuador	WTT	Clay	(Argentina) Juan Pablo Ficovich	6–2, 6–0
Win	7–5	Feb 2020	M25 Lima, Peru	WTT	Clay	(Spain) Carlos Gómez-Herrera	6–2, 6–2
Loss	7–6	Feb 2020	M25 Lima, Peru	WTT	Clay	(Argentina) Facundo Argüello	2–6, 4–6

=== Doubles: 8 (4 titles, 4 runner-ups) ===
Finals by surface
Hard (1–1)
Clay (3–3)

Result	W–L	Date	Tournament	Tier	Surface	Partner	Opponents	Score
Loss	0–1	Oct 2015	Chile F6, Santiago	Futures	Clay	(Chile) Jorge Montero	(Chile) Jorge Aguilar (Chile) Victor Núñez	walkover
Loss	0–2	Dec 2015	Chile F8, Temuco	Futures	Clay	(Chile) Jorge Montero	(Argentina) Franco Agamenone (Argentina) Patricio Heras	6–2, 6–7 ^{(5–7)}, [8–10]
Win	1–2	Dec 2015	Chile F9, Osorno	Futures	Clay	(Chile) Jorge Montero	(Chile) Guillermo Rivera Aránguiz (Chile) Cristóbal Saavedra Corvalán	6–4, 6–1
Loss	1–3	Dec 2015	Chile F10, Puerto Montt	Futures	Hard	(Chile) Jorge Montero	(Argentina) Franco Agamenone (Argentina) Tomás Lipovšek Puches	3–6, 6–3, [3–10]
Win	2–3	Dec 2016	Chile F12, Talca	Futures	Clay	(Chile) Jorge Montero	(Argentina) Gabriel Alejandro Hidalgo (Argentina) Federico Moreno	6–4, 6–3
Win	3–3	Mar 2017	Greece F3, Heraklion	Futures	Hard	(France) Benjamin Bonzi	(Belarus) Yaraslav Shyla (Belarus) Dzmitry Zhyrmont	4–6, 7–6 ^{(7–5)}, [10–7]
Loss	3–4	Nov 2017	Chile F7, Talca	Futures	Clay	(Chile) Juan Carlos Sáez	(Argentina) Mariano Kestelboim (Argentina) Matias Zukas	6–7^{(5–7)}, 5–7
Win	4–4	Feb 2020	M25 Lima, Peru	WTT	Clay	(Spain) Carlos Gómez-Herrera	(Argentina) Nicolás Alberto Arreche (Peru) Jorge Panta	7–5, 6–2

== National representation ==
=== Davis Cup ===
==== Participations: 8 (3–5) ====
Group membership World Group (0–1) Qualifying Round (1–3) WG Play-off (0–0) Group I (2–1) Group II (0–0) Group III (0–0) Group IV (0–0)	Matches by surface Hard (1–2) Clay (2–3)	Matches by type Singles (1–1) Doubles (2–4)

- ▲ ▼ indicates the outcome of the Davis Cup match followed by the score, date, place of event, the zonal classification and its phase, and the court surface.

Rubber outcome	No.	Rubber	Match type (partner if any)	Opponent nation	Opponent player(s)	Score
▲5–0; 3-5 February 2017; Centro Nacional de Tenis Parque del Este, Santo Domingo, Dominican Republic; Davis Cup Group I semi-finals; hard (outdoor) surface
Victory	1	IV	Singles	Dominican Republic	José Olivares	7–6^{10–8}, 7–6^{7–2}
▲3–2; 1-2 February 2019; Salzburgarena, Salzburg, Austria; Davis Cup Finals Qualifying Round; clay (indoor) surface
Defeat	2	III	Doubles (with Hans Podlipnik)	Austria	Oliver Marach / Jürgen Melzer	4–6, 6–2, 5–7
▼1–2; 21 November 2019; Caja Mágica, Madrid, España; Davis Cup Finals; hard (indoor) surface
Defeat	3	III	Doubles (with Alejandro Tabilo)	Germany	Kevin Krawietz / Andreas Mies	6–7^{(3–7)}, 3–6
▼1–3; 6-7 March 2020; Royal Tennis Hall, Stockholm, Sweden; Davis Cup qualifying round; hard (indoor) surface
Defeat	4	II	Singles	Sweden	Mikael Ymer	2–6, 3–6
Defeat	5	III	Doubles (with Alejandro Tabilo)	Sweden	Markus Eriksson / Robert Lindstedt	4–6, 4–6
▼1–3; 17-18 September 2021; NTC Arena, Bratislava, Slovakia; Davis Cup World Group I; hard (indoor) surface
Defeat	6	III	Doubles (with Alejandro Tabilo)	Slovakia	Filip Polášek / Igor Zelenay	1–6, 6–7^{(4–7)}
▲4–0; 4-5 March 2022; Club de Tenis Unión, Viña del Mar, Chile; Davis Cup World Group I play-offs; clay (outdoor) surface
Victory	7	III	Doubles (with Alejandro Tabilo)	Slovenia	Sebastian Dominko / Blaž Rola	6–2, 6–3
▲3–1; 3-4 February 2023; Campus Trentino, La Serena, Chile; Davis Cup qualifying round; clay (outdoor) surface
Victory	8	III	Doubles (with Alejandro Tabilo)	Kazakhstan	Andrey Golubev / Aleksandr Nedovyesov	6–4, 7–5
