= 2024 Yucatán Open – Doubles =

Doubles
- 2024 Yucatán Open

Final
- Champions: (Australia) Thomas Fancutt (United States) Hunter Reese
- Runners-up: (United States) Boris Kozlov (United States) Stefan Kozlov
- Score: 7–5, 6–3

Events
Singles	Doubles
- Yucatán Open

This was the first edition of the tournament.

Thomas Fancutt and Hunter Reese won the title after defeating Boris and Stefan Kozlov 7–5, 6–3 in the final.

== Seeds ==
1. (United States) George Goldhoff / (Japan) James Trotter (quarterfinals)
2. (Australia) Thomas Fancutt / (United States) Hunter Reese (champions)
3. (Argentina) Juan Pablo Paz / (Austria) David Pichler (first round)
4. (Romania) Gabi Adrian Boitan / (United States) Trey Hilderbrand (first round)

== Draw ==
Key

- Q = Qualifier
- WC = Wild card
- LL = Lucky loser
- Alt = Alternate
- ITF = ITF entry
- PR = Protected ranking
- SR = Special ranking
- SE = Special exempt
- JE = Junior exempt
- JR = Junior Accelerator Programme entrant
- CO = College Accelerator Programme entrant
- NG = Next Gen Accelerator Program entrant
- w/o = Walkover
- r = Retired
- d = Defaulted

=== Draw ===
First round
1	(United States) G Goldhoff (Japan) J Trotter	6	6
WC	(Mexico) Daniel Moreno (Mexico) AF Rubio Fierros	4	0
(South Korea) G Campaña Lee (Mexico) R Pacheco Méndez	6	3	[11]
(Dominican Republic) R Cid Subervi (Dominican Republic) N Hardt	4	6	[9]
3	(Argentina) JP Paz (Austria) D Pichler	6^{5}	3
(United States) Jack Vance (United States) Tennyson Whiting	7^{7}	6
(United States) Jacob Brumm (Italy) Elio José Ribeiro Lago	3	2
Alt	(United States) Boris Kozlov (United States) S Kozlov	6	6
(Bolivia) M Dellien (Argentina) F Mena	6	6
(United States) Preston Brown (Canada) D Martin	3	3
(United States) P Kumar (Germany) L Wessels	6	6
4	(Romania) GA Boitan (United States) T Hilderbrand	3	4
WC	(Mexico) Emiliano Aguilera (Mexico) A Hernández	6	3	[7]
(United States) Nicholas Bybel (United Kingdom) O Crawford	4	6	[10]
(United States) A Ayeni (United States) T Boyer	4	5
2	(Australia) T Fancutt (United States) H Reese	6	7

Quarterfinals
1	(United States) G Goldhoff (Japan) J Trotter	6^{4}	5
(South Korea) G Campaña Lee (Mexico) R Pacheco Méndez	7^{7}	7
(United States) Jac Vance (United States) T Whiting	7^{7}	4	[4]
Alt	(United States) B Kozlov (United States) S Kozlov	6^{4}	6	[10]
(Bolivia) M Dellien (Argentina) F Mena	6	7
(United States) P Kumar (Germany) L Wessels	3	5
(United States) N Bybel (United Kingdom) O Crawford	4	5
2	(Australia) T Fancutt (United States) H Reese	6	7

Semifinals
(South Korea) G Campaña Lee (Mexico) R Pacheco Méndez	0	4
Alt	(United States) B Kozlov (United States) S Kozlov	6	6
(Bolivia) M Dellien (Argentina) F Mena
2	(Australia) T Fancutt (United States) H Reese	w/o

Final
Alt	(United States) B Kozlov (United States) S Kozlov	5	3
2	(Australia) T Fancutt (United States) H Reese	7	6
