= 2025 Yucatán Open – Singles =

Singles
- 2025 Yucatán Open

Final
- Champion: (Brazil) Felipe Meligeni Alves
- Runner-up: (Argentina) Juan Pablo Ficovich
- Score: 6–2, 1–6, 6–2

Events
Singles	Doubles
- Yucatán Open

Tristan Boyer was the defending champion but chose not to defend his title.

Felipe Meligeni Alves won the title after defeating Juan Pablo Ficovich 6–2, 1–6, 6–2 in the final.

== Seeds ==
1. (Bolivia) Hugo Dellien (semifinals)
2. (Chile) Cristian Garín (semifinals)
3. (Argentina) Juan Pablo Ficovich (final)
4. (Brazil) Felipe Meligeni Alves (champion)
5. (Australia) Bernard Tomic (second round)
6. (Kazakhstan) Dmitry Popko (second round)
7. (Mexico) Rodrigo Pacheco Méndez (quarterfinals)
8. (France) Enzo Couacaud (second round)

== Draw ==
Key

- Q = Qualifier
- WC = Wild card
- LL = Lucky loser
- Alt = Alternate
- ITF = ITF entry
- PR = Protected ranking
- SR = Special ranking
- SE = Special exempt
- JE = Junior exempt
- JR = Junior Accelerator Programme entrant
- CO = College Accelerator Programme entrant
- NG = Next Gen Accelerator Program entrant
- w/o = Walkover
- r = Retired
- d = Defaulted

=== Finals ===
Semifinals
1	(Bolivia) Hugo Dellien	3	7	5
3	(Argentina) Juan Pablo Ficovich	6	5	7
4	(Brazil) Felipe Meligeni Alves	6^{6}	6	6
2	(Chile) Cristian Garín	7^{8}	3	4

Final
3	(Argentina) Juan Pablo Ficovich	2	6	2
4	(Brazil) Felipe Meligeni Alves	6	1	6

=== Top half ===
First round
1	(Bolivia) H Dellien	7	6
(France) M Janvier	5	3
Q	(United States) J Sheehy	6	1	7^{7}
(United States) A Mayo	1	6	6^{2}
(Argentina) R Olivo	6	3	6
(Germany) M Wiskandt	4	6	3
(Germany) Elmar Ejupovic	0	5
5	(Australia) B Tomic	6	7
3	(Argentina) JP Ficovich	6	7
Q	(United States) K Poling	4	5
(United States) T Zink	6	6
(Ukraine) V Orlov	4	0
(United States) G Johns	6	6
(Romania) Sebastian Gima	4	4
(Switzerland) K Feldbausch	3	2
8	(France) E Couacaud	6	6

Second round
1	(Bolivia) H Dellien	6	6^{5}	6
Q	(United States) J Sheehy	3	7^{7}	3
(Argentina) R Olivo	6	3	7^{7}
5	(Australia) B Tomic	4	6	6^{4}
3	(Argentina) JP Ficovich	6	6
(United States) T Zink	3	4
(United States) G Johns	4	7	6
8	(France) E Couacaud	6	5	3

Quarterfinals
1	(Bolivia) H Dellien	6	6
(Argentina) R Olivo	2	0
3	(Argentina) JP Ficovich	6	6
(United States) G Johns	3	4

Semifinals
1	(Bolivia) H Dellien	3	7	5
3	(Argentina) JP Ficovich	6	5	7

=== Bottom half ===
First round
6	(Kazakhstan) D Popko	6	6
(Ecuador) A Andrade	3	4
Q	(Canada) D Martin	6	1	4
(Bolivia) JC Prado Ángelo	1	6	6
(United States) Patrick Maloney	6	7^{12}
Q	(Mexico) AF Rubio Fierros	2	6^{10}
WC	(Mexico) Rodrigo Alujas	3	4
4	(Brazil) F Meligeni Alves	6	6
7	(Mexico) R Pacheco Méndez	6	6
(United States) G Nanda	0	1
Q	(United States) T Hilderbrand	4	2
WC	(Mexico) A Hernández	6	6
Q	(France) Robin Catry	3	1
(Bulgaria) P Nesterov	6	6
WC	(Colombia) Miguel Tobón	2	0
2	(Chile) C Garín	6	6

Second round
6	(Kazakhstan) D Popko	5	6	6^{4}
(Bolivia) JC Prado Ángelo	7	1	7^{7}
(United States) P Maloney	6^{5}	3
4	(Brazil) F Meligeni Alves	7^{7}	6
7	(Mexico) R Pacheco Méndez	6	7
WC	(Mexico) A Hernández	3	5
(Bulgaria) P Nesterov	4	3
2	(Chile) C Garín	6	6

Quarterfinals
(Bolivia) JC Prado Ángelo	1	0
4	(Brazil) F Meligeni Alves	6	6
7	(Mexico) R Pacheco Méndez	3	1
2	(Chile) C Garín	6	6

Semifinals
4	(Brazil) F Meligeni Alves	6^{6}	6	6
2	(Chile) C Garín	7^{8}	3	4
