= 2024 Yucatán Open – Singles =

Singles
- 2024 Yucatán Open

Final
- Champion: (United States) Tristan Boyer
- Runner-up: (Argentina) Juan Pablo Ficovich
- Score: 7–6^{(8–6)}, 6–2

Events
Singles	Doubles
- Yucatán Open

This was the first edition of the tournament.

Tristan Boyer won the title after defeating Juan Pablo Ficovich 7–6^{(8–6)}, 6–2 in the final.

== Seeds ==
1. (United Kingdom) Oliver Crawford (first round)
2. (Italy) Federico Gaio (first round)
3. (United States) Tristan Boyer (champion)
4. (Bolivia) Murkel Dellien (semifinals)
5. (Argentina) Juan Pablo Ficovich (final)
6. (Kazakhstan) Dmitry Popko (quarterfinals)
7. (Switzerland) Antoine Bellier (first round)
8. (United States) Aidan Mayo (first round)

== Draw ==
Key

- Q = Qualifier
- WC = Wild card
- LL = Lucky loser
- Alt = Alternate
- ITF = ITF entry
- PR = Protected ranking
- SR = Special ranking
- SE = Special exempt
- JE = Junior exempt
- JR = Junior Accelerator Programme entrant
- CO = College Accelerator Programme entrant
- NG = Next Gen Accelerator Program entrant
- w/o = Walkover
- r = Retired
- d = Defaulted

=== Finals ===
Semifinals
(Dominican Republic) Nick Hardt	1	4
3	(United States) Tristan Boyer	6	6
4	(Bolivia) Murkel Dellien	6	3	4
5	(Argentina) Juan Pablo Ficovich	3	6	6

Final
3	(United States) Tristan Boyer	7^{8}	6
5	(Argentina) Juan Pablo Ficovich	6^{6}	2

=== Top half ===
First round
1	(United Kingdom) O Crawford	6^{0}	6	2
Q	(United States) Jacob Brumm	7^{7}	2	6
Q	(Argentina) JP Paz	4	6	3
(Dominican Republic) N Hardt	6	3	6
(Romania) GA Boitan	6	6
Q	(Canada) D Martin	2	3
(Argentina) F Mena	6	6
7	(Switzerland) A Bellier	4	1
3	(United States) T Boyer	6	6
(United States) A Ayeni	0	3
(Mexico) R Pacheco Méndez	6	6
(Japan) J Trotter	4	4
(United States) A Rybakov	6	6
(Germany) L Wessels	2	2
(Australia) T Fancutt	4	5
6	(Kazakhstan) D Popko	6	7

Second round
Q	(United States) J Brumm	1	3
(Dominican Republic) N Hardt	6	6
(Romania) GA Boitan	6^{3}	3
(Argentina) F Mena	7^{7}	6
3	(United States) T Boyer	6	7
(Mexico) R Pacheco Méndez	1	5
(United States) A Rybakov
6	(Kazakhstan) D Popko	w/o

Quarterfinals
(Dominican Republic) N Hardt	6	6
(Argentina) F Mena	4	4
3	(United States) T Boyer	1	6	6
6	(Kazakhstan) D Popko	6	2	3

Semifinals
(Dominican Republic) N Hardt	1	4
3	(United States) T Boyer	6	6

=== Bottom half ===
First round
8	(United States) A Mayo	2	6	1
(Dominican Republic) R Cid Subervi	6	3	6
(Austria) D Pichler	6	3	6
Q	(United States) Christian Langmo	4	6	3
WC	(Mexico) AF Rubio Fierros	4	6^{4}
WC	(Mexico) A Hernández	6	7^{7}
(United States) O Baris	3	2
4	(Bolivia) M Dellien	6	6
5	(Argentina) JP Ficovich	6	6
WC	(Mexico) Emiliano Aguilera	3	1
Q	(United States) Preston Brown	7^{7}	4	3
(South Korea) G Campaña Lee	6^{1}	6	6
(Germany) Elmar Ejupovic	7^{7}	6
Q	(United States) T Hilderbrand	6^{3}	3
Alt	(United States) S Kozlov	6	4	6
2	(Italy) F Gaio	4	6	2

Second round
(Dominican Republic) R Cid Subervi	6	4	6
(Austria) D Pichler	2	6	4
WC	(Mexico) A Hernández	1	6	3
4	(Bolivia) M Dellien	6	3	6
5	(Argentina) JP Ficovich	6	6
(South Korea) G Campaña Lee	2	2
(Germany) E Ejupovic	3	2
Alt	(United States) S Kozlov	6	6

Quarterfinals
(Dominican Republic) R Cid Subervi	2	2
4	(Bolivia) M Dellien	6	6
5	(Argentina) JP Ficovich	7^{8}	6
Alt	(United States) S Kozlov	6^{6}	2

Semifinals
4	(Bolivia) M Dellien	6	3	4
5	(Argentina) JP Ficovich	3	6	6
