= 2024 Yucatán Open =

- Date: 18–23 March
- Edition: 1st
- Surface: Clay
- Location: Mérida, Mexico

Champions

Singles
- (United States) Tristan Boyer

Doubles
- (Australia) Thomas Fancutt / (United States) Hunter Reese
Yucatán Open	· 2025 →

The 2024 Yucatán Open was a professional tennis tournament played on clay courts. It was the first edition of the tournament which was part of the 2024 ATP Challenger Tour. It took place in Mérida, Mexico, between 18 and 23 March 2024.

== Singles main draw entrants ==
=== Seeds ===
Country	Player	Rank^{1}	Seed
GBR	Oliver Crawford	204	1
ITA	Federico Gaio	212	2
USA	Tristan Boyer	229	3
BOL	Murkel Dellien	247	4
ARG	Juan Pablo Ficovich	250	5
KAZ	Dmitry Popko	276	6
SUI	Antoine Bellier	300	7
USA	Aidan Mayo	306	8

- ^{1} Rankings are as of 4 March 2024.

=== Other entrants ===
The following players received wildcards into the singles main draw:

- (Mexico) Emiliano Aguilera
- (Mexico) Alex Hernández
- (Mexico) Alan Fernando Rubio Fierros

The following player received entry into the singles main draw as an alternate:

- (United States) Stefan Kozlov

The following players received entry from the qualifying draw:

- (United States) Preston Brown
- (United States) Jacob Brumm
- (United States) Trey Hilderbrand
- (United States) Christian Langmo
- (Canada) Dan Martin
- (Argentina) Juan Pablo Paz

== Champions ==
=== Singles ===
- (United States) Tristan Boyer def. (Argentina) Juan Pablo Ficovich 7–6^{(8–6)}, 6–2.

=== Doubles ===
- (Australia) Thomas Fancutt / (United States) Hunter Reese def. (United States) Boris Kozlov / (United States) Stefan Kozlov 7–5, 6–3.
