= 2026 Banorte Tennis Open – Singles =

Singles
- 2026 Banorte Tennis Open

Final
- Champion: (Colombia) Nicolás Mejía
- Runner-up: (Australia) James Duckworth
- Score: 7–6^{(8–6)}, 6–2

Events
Singles	Doubles
- Banorte Tennis Open

James Duckworth was the defending champion but lost in the final to Nicolás Mejía.

Mejía won the title after defeating Duckworth 7–6^{(8–6)}, 6–2 in the final.

== Seeds ==
1. (Australia) James Duckworth (final)
2. (Australia) Tristan Schoolkate (semifinals)
3. (Colombia) Nicolás Mejía (champion)
4. (Argentina) Juan Pablo Ficovich (quarterfinals)
5. (Switzerland) Marc-Andrea Hüsler (first round)
6. (France) Luka Pavlovic (second round)
7. (United States) Stefan Kozlov (first round)
8. (Italy) Stefano Napolitano (first round)

== Draw ==
Key

- Q = Qualifier
- WC = Wild card
- LL = Lucky loser
- Alt = Alternate
- ITF = ITF entry
- PR = Protected ranking
- SR = Special ranking
- SE = Special exempt
- JE = Junior exempt
- JR = Junior Accelerator Programme entrant
- CO = College Accelerator Programme entrant
- NG = Next Gen Accelerator Program entrant
- w/o = Walkover
- r = Retired
- d = Defaulted

=== Finals ===
Semifinals
1	(Australia) James Duckworth	4	6	7^{9}
(Mexico) Rodrigo Pacheco Méndez	6	3	6^{7}
3	(Colombia) Nicolás Mejía	6^{3}	6	7^{7}
2	(Australia) Tristan Schoolkate	7^{7}	2	6^{3}

Final
1	(Australia) James Duckworth	6^{6}	2
3	(Colombia) Nicolás Mejía	7^{8}	6

=== Top half ===
First round
1	(Australia) J Duckworth	6	6
WC	(Mexico) AF Rubio Fierros	1	1
PR	(United States) N Moreno de Alboran	1	2
Q	(Colombia) Miguel Tobón	6	6
(France) Robin Catry	6^{7}	6	4
(Kazakhstan) B Zhukayev	7^{9}	1	6
(Canada) D Martin	7^{7}	7^{7}
5	(Switzerland) M-A Hüsler	6^{2}	6^{5}
4	(Argentina) JP Ficovich	6	6
(Brazil) M Alves	0	2
Q	(Spain) Iván Marrero Curbelo	6	6
(Australia) Ja Delaney	2	4
Q	(Belgium) T Colson	4	2
(Mexico) R Pacheco Méndez	6	6
(United States) A Fenty	3	6^{3}
6	(France) L Pavlovic	6	7^{7}

Second round
1	(Australia) J Duckworth	6	6
Q	(Colombia) M Tobón	4	3
(Kazakhstan) B Zhukayev	7^{7}	6^{6}	6
(Canada) D Martin	6^{3}	7^{8}	4
4	(Argentina) JP Ficovich	6	6
Q	(Spain) I Marrero Curbelo	1	4
(Mexico) R Pacheco Méndez	4	6	6
6	(France) L Pavlovic	6	3	0

Quarterfinals
1	(Australia) J Duckworth	6	6
(Kazakhstan) B Zhukayev	2	3
4	(Argentina) JP Ficovich	6	1	4
(Mexico) R Pacheco Méndez	3	6	6

Semifinals
1	(Australia) J Duckworth	4	6	7^{9}
(Mexico) R Pacheco Méndez	6	3	6^{7}

=== Bottom half ===
First round
7	(United States) S Kozlov	3	6^{7}
WC	(Mexico) A Magadán	6	7^{9}
(Chile) M Soto	6	6
Alt	(Ukraine) V Orlov	1	2
Q	(United States) T Winegar	6^{4}	5
WC	(Mexico) Rodrigo Alujas	7^{7}	7
(Mexico) A Hernández	3	7^{7}	3
3	(Colombia) N Mejía	6	6^{3}	6
8	(Italy) S Napolitano	4	0
(Argentina) F Mena	6	6
(Germany) M Wiskandt	4	4
(Germany) P Zahraj	6	6
(France) C Denolly	7^{7}	6
Q	(United States) Maxwell McKennon	6^{3}	3
Q	(United States) A Ayeni	7^{12}	3	2
2	(Australia) T Schoolkate	6^{10}	6	6

Second round
WC	(Mexico) A Magadán	6^{3}	6	3
(Chile) M Soto	7^{7}	2	6
WC	(Mexico) R Alujas	0	2
3	(Colombia) N Mejía	6	6
(Argentina) F Mena	6	6
(Germany) P Zahraj	2	1
(France) C Denolly	1	2
2	(Australia) T Schoolkate	6	6

Quarterfinals
(Chile) M Soto	6^{5}	4
3	(Colombia) N Mejía	7^{7}	6
(Argentina) F Mena	6	2	6^{2}
2	(Australia) T Schoolkate	2	6	7^{7}

Semifinals
3	(Colombia) N Mejía	6^{3}	6	7^{7}
2	(Australia) T Schoolkate	7^{7}	2	6^{3}
