= 2022 San Marcos Open Aguascalientes – Doubles =

Doubles
- 2022 San Marcos Open Aguascalientes

Final
- Champions: (Colombia) Nicolás Barrientos (Mexico) Miguel Ángel Reyes-Varela
- Runners-up: (Portugal) Gonçalo Oliveira (India) Divij Sharan
- Score: 7–5, 6–3

Events
Singles	Doubles
- San Marcos Open Aguascalientes

This was the first edition of the tournament.

Nicolás Barrientos and Miguel Ángel Reyes-Varela won the title after defeating Gonçalo Oliveira and Divij Sharan 7–5, 6–3 in the final.

== Seeds ==
1. (Colombia) Nicolás Barrientos / (Mexico) Miguel Ángel Reyes-Varela (champions)
2. (Slovakia) Andrej Martin / (Austria) Tristan-Samuel Weissborn (semifinals)
3. (Portugal) Gonçalo Oliveira / (India) Divij Sharan (final)
4. (Venezuela) Luis David Martínez / (India) Jeevan Nedunchezhiyan (semifinals)

== Draw ==
Key

- Q = Qualifier
- WC = Wild card
- LL = Lucky loser
- Alt = Alternate
- ITF = ITF entry
- PR = Protected ranking
- SR = Special ranking
- SE = Special exempt
- JE = Junior exempt
- JR = Junior Accelerator Programme entrant
- CO = College Accelerator Programme entrant
- NG = Next Gen Accelerator Program entrant
- w/o = Walkover
- r = Retired
- d = Defaulted

First round
1	(Colombia) N Barrientos (Mexico) MÁ Reyes-Varela	7	6
(Romania) FC Jianu (Colombia) N Mejía	5	4
WC	(Japan) S Mochizuki (Mexico) R Pacheco Méndez	2	6^{2}
(Mexico) L Patiño (Ecuador) R Quiroz	6	7^{7}
4	(Venezuela) LD Martínez (India) J Nedunchezhiyan	6	6
Alt	(Argentina) JP Ficovich (Argentina) Matías Zukas	4	2
(Switzerland) L Castelnuovo (Switzerland) J Paul	3	7^{8}	[2]
(United Kingdom) J Clarke (Netherlands) T van Rijthoven	6	6^{6}	[10]
(Canada) S Diez (Uzbekistan) D Istomin	7^{7}	6^{4}	[5]
(Zimbabwe) B Lock (Tunisia) S Mansouri	6^{4}	7^{7}	[10]
(Bolivia) B Arias (Bolivia) F Zeballos	6^{7}	6	[5]
3	(Portugal) G Oliveira (India) D Sharan	7^{9}	2	[10]
(Australia) R Hijikata (Australia) A Santillan	4	4
(United States) JC Aragone (Spain) A Menéndez Maceiras	6	6
WC	(Mexico) LC Álvarez (Mexico) A Hernández	3	3
2	(Slovakia) A Martin (Austria) T-S Weissborn	6	6

Quarterfinals
1	(Colombia) N Barrientos (Mexico) MÁ Reyes-Varela	6	6
(Mexico) L Patiño (Ecuador) R Quiroz	3	4
4	(Venezuela) LD Martínez (India) J Nedunchezhiyan	6	6
(United Kingdom) J Clarke (Netherlands) T van Rijthoven	4	4
(Zimbabwe) B Lock (Tunisia) S Mansouri	6^{5}	3
3	(Portugal) G Oliveira (India) D Sharan	7^{7}	6
(United States) JC Aragone (Spain) A Menéndez Maceiras	4	6^{6}
2	(Slovakia) A Martin (Austria) T-S Weissborn	6	7^{8}

Semifinals
1	(Colombia) N Barrientos (Mexico) MÁ Reyes-Varela	6	4	[10]
4	(Venezuela) LD Martínez (India) J Nedunchezhiyan	4	6	[2]
3	(Portugal) G Oliveira (India) D Sharan	6	6^{2}	[10]
2	(Slovakia) A Martin (Austria) T-S Weissborn	4	7^{7}	[4]

Final
1	(Colombia) N Barrientos (Mexico) MÁ Reyes-Varela	7	6
3	(Portugal) G Oliveira (India) D Sharan	5	3
