= 2024 Campeonato Internacional de Tênis de Campinas – Doubles =

Doubles
- 2024 Campeonato Internacional de Tênis de Campinas

Final
- Champions: (Brazil) Mateus Alves (Brazil) Orlando Luz
- Runners-up: (Chile) Tomás Barrios Vera (Argentina) Facundo Mena
- Score: 6–3, 6–4

Events
Singles	Doubles
← 2023 ·	Campeonato Internacional de Tênis de Campinas	· 2025 →

Guido Andreozzi and Guillermo Durán were the defending champions but chose not to defend their title.

Mateus Alves and Orlando Luz won the title after defeating Tomás Barrios Vera and Facundo Mena 6–3, 6–4 in the final.

== Seeds ==
1. (Poland) Karol Drzewiecki / (Poland) Piotr Matuszewski (first round)
2. (Brazil) Fernando Romboli / (Chile) Matías Soto (first round)
3. (Bolivia) Boris Arias / (Bolivia) Federico Zeballos (quarterfinals)
4. (Brazil) Mateus Alves / (Brazil) Orlando Luz (champions)

== Draw ==
=== Key ===
- Q = Qualifier
- WC = Wild card
- LL = Lucky loser
- Alt = Alternate
- SE = Special exempt
- PR = Protected ranking
- ITF = ITF entry
- JE = Junior exempt
- w/o = Walkover
- r = Retired
- d = Defaulted
- SR = Special ranking

=== Draw ===
First round
1	(Poland) K Drzewiecki (Poland) P Matuszewski	5	6	[7]
(Argentina) A Collarini (Bolivia) M Dellien	7	4	[10]
(Brazil) L Britto (Brazil) PA Saraiva dos Santos	6^{5}	6^{2}
(United Kingdom) S Duncan (United States) H Reese	7^{7}	7^{7}
4	(Brazil) M Alves (Brazil) O Luz	6	6
WC	(Brazil) G Heide (Brazil) Bruno Oliveira	1	2
(United States) T Boyer (Argentina) JP Ficovich	2	6	[5]
(Uruguay) I Carou (Argentina) C Ugo Carabelli	6	2	[10]
(Argentina) FA Gómez (Venezuela) LD Martínez	6	3	[10]
PR	(Peru) A Huertas del Pino (Peru) C Huertas del Pino	2	6	[5]
(Argentina) S Rodríguez Taverna (United States) Tennyson Whiting	4	3
3	(Bolivia) B Arias (Bolivia) F Zeballos	6	6
WC	(Brazil) Enzo Camargo Lima (Brazil) D Dutra da Silva	3	2
(Brazil) F Meligeni Alves (Brazil) M Zormann	6	6
(Chile) T Barrios Vera (Argentina) F Mena	6	3	[11]
2	(Brazil) F Romboli (Chile) M Soto	3	6	[9]

Quarterfinals
(Argentina) A Collarini (Bolivia) M Dellien	4	6^{5}
(United Kingdom) S Duncan (United States) H Reese	6	7^{7}
4	(Brazil) M Alves (Brazil) O Luz	w/o
(Uruguay) I Carou (Argentina) C Ugo Carabelli
(Argentina) FA Gómez (Venezuela) LD Martínez	6^{3}	7	[10]
3	(Bolivia) B Arias (Bolivia) F Zeballos	7^{7}	5	[3]
(Brazil) F Meligeni Alves (Brazil) M Zormann	6	4	[7]
(Chile) T Barrios Vera (Argentina) F Mena	0	6	[10]

Semifinals
(United Kingdom) S Duncan (United States) H Reese	7^{7}	4	[8]
4	(Brazil) M Alves (Brazil) O Luz	6^{5}	6	[10]
(Argentina) FA Gómez (Venezuela) LD Martínez	6	3	[3]
(Chile) T Barrios Vera (Argentina) F Mena	3	6	[10]

Final
4	(Brazil) M Alves (Brazil) O Luz	6	6
(Chile) T Barrios Vera (Argentina) F Mena	3	4
