= 2025 Yucatán Open – Doubles =

Doubles
- 2025 Yucatán Open

Final
- Champions: (Switzerland) Kilian Feldbausch (Mexico) Rodrigo Pacheco Méndez
- Runners-up: (United States) George Goldhoff (United States) Trey Hilderbrand
- Score: 6–4, 6–2

Events
Singles	Doubles
- Yucatán Open

Thomas Fancutt and Hunter Reese were the defending champions but chose not to defend their title.

Kilian Feldbausch and Rodrigo Pacheco Méndez won the title after defeating George Goldhoff and Trey Hilderbrand 6–4, 6–2 in the final.

== Seeds ==
1. (Ecuador) Diego Hidalgo / (United States) Reese Stalder (first round)
2. (United States) George Goldhoff / (United States) Trey Hilderbrand (final)
3. (Australia) Patrick Harper / (New Zealand) Finn Reynolds (semifinals)
4. (Chinese Taipei) Ray Ho / (United States) Joshua Sheehy (quarterfinals)

== Draw ==
Key

- Q = Qualifier
- WC = Wild card
- LL = Lucky loser
- Alt = Alternate
- ITF = ITF entry
- PR = Protected ranking
- SR = Special ranking
- SE = Special exempt
- JE = Junior exempt
- JR = Junior Accelerator Programme entrant
- CO = College Accelerator Programme entrant
- NG = Next Gen Accelerator Program entrant
- w/o = Walkover
- r = Retired
- d = Defaulted

=== Draw ===
First round
1	(Ecuador) D Hidalgo (United States) R Stalder	6	4	[7]
(Switzerland) K Feldbausch (Mexico) R Pacheco Méndez	4	6	[10]
WC	(Spain) Iván Marrero Curbelo (Mexico) AF Rubio Fierros	1	5
(United States) Tennyson Whiting (United States) E Zhu	6	7
4	(Chinese Taipei) R Ho (United States) J Sheehy	6	3	[10]
(United States) Patrick Maloney (Canada) B Sigouin	3	6	[3]
(United States) G Johns (Kazakhstan) D Popko	3	3
(Canada) C Harper (United States) T Zink	6	6
Alt	(Canada) D Martin (United States) K Poling	6	6
WC	(Mexico) A Hernández (Mexico) Daniel Moreno	2	4
(United States) Tristan McCormick (United States) G Nanda	6	1	[9]
3	(Australia) P Harper (New Zealand) F Reynolds	4	6	[11]
(Bulgaria) P Nesterov (Ukraine) V Orlov	4	6	[7]
(France) M Janvier (Venezuela) B Pérez	6	2	[10]
(Ecuador) A Andrade (United States) M Kiger	1	6^{3}
2	(United States) G Goldhoff (United States) T Hilderbrand	6	7^{7}

Quarterfinals
(Switzerland) K Feldbausch (Mexico) R Pacheco Méndez	6	6
(United States) T Whiting (United States) E Zhu	4	2
4	(Chinese Taipei) R Ho (United States) J Sheehy	3	4
(Canada) C Harper (United States) T Zink	6	6
Alt	(Canada) D Martin (United States) K Poling
3	(Australia) P Harper (New Zealand) F Reynolds	w/o
(France) M Janvier (Venezuela) B Pérez	6^{2}	3
2	(United States) G Goldhoff (United States) T Hilderbrand	7^{7}	6

Semifinals
(Switzerland) K Feldbausch (Mexico) R Pacheco Méndez	6	6
(Canada) C Harper (United States) T Zink	4	2
3	(Australia) P Harper (New Zealand) F Reynolds	6	3	[5]
2	(United States) G Goldhoff (United States) T Hilderbrand	3	6	[10]

Final
(Switzerland) K Feldbausch (Mexico) R Pacheco Méndez	6	6
2	(United States) G Goldhoff (United States) T Hilderbrand	4	2
