= 2026 Banorte Tennis Open =

- Date: 30 March – 5 April
- Edition: 38th
- Surface: Clay
- Location: San Luis Potosí, Mexico
- Venue: Club Deportivo Potosino

Champions

Singles
- (Colombia) Nicolás Mejía

Doubles
- (Australia) Jake Delaney / (Australia) Tristan Schoolkate
- Banorte Tennis Open

The 2026 Banorte Tennis Open was a professional tennis tournament played on outdoor clay courts. It was the 38th edition of the tournament which was part of the 2026 ATP Challenger Tour. It took place at the Club Deportivo Potosino in San Luis Potosí, Mexico between 30 March and 5 April 2026.

== Singles main-draw entrants ==
=== Seeds ===
| Country | Player | Rank^{1} | Seed |
|---|---|---|---|
| AUS | James Duckworth | 80 | 1 |
| AUS | Tristan Schoolkate | 114 | 2 |
| COL | Nicolás Mejía | 185 | 3 |
| ARG | Juan Pablo Ficovich | 208 | 4 |
| SUI | Marc-Andrea Hüsler | 217 | 5 |
| FRA | Luka Pavlovic | 219 | 6 |
| USA | Stefan Kozlov | 265 | 7 |
| ITA | Stefano Napolitano | 299 | 8 |

- ^{1} Rankings are as of 16 March 2026.

=== Other entrants ===
The following players received wildcards into the singles main draw:

- (Mexico) Rodrigo Alujas
- (Mexico) Alan Magadán
- (Mexico) Alan Fernando Rubio Fierros

The following player received entry into the singles main draw using a protected ranking:

- (United States) Nicolas Moreno de Alboran

The following player received entry into the singles main draw as an alternate:

- (Ukraine) Vladyslav Orlov

The following players received entry from the qualifying draw:

- (United States) Alafia Ayeni
- (Belgium) Tibo Colson
- (Spain) Iván Marrero Curbelo
- (United States) Maxwell McKennon
- (Colombia) Miguel Tobón
- (United States) Theodore Winegar

== Champions ==
=== Singles ===
- (Colombia) Nicolás Mejía def. (Australia) James Duckworth 7–6^{(8–6)}, 6–2.

=== Doubles ===
- (Australia) Jake Delaney / (Australia) Tristan Schoolkate def. (Argentina) Facundo Mena / (Mexico) Rodrigo Pacheco Méndez 6–4, 7–6^{(7–2)}.
