= 2022 San Marcos Open Aguascalientes – Singles =

Singles
- 2022 San Marcos Open Aguascalientes

Final
- Champion: (Switzerland) Marc-Andrea Hüsler
- Runner-up: (Argentina) Juan Pablo Ficovich
- Score: 6–4, 4–6, 6–3

Events
Singles	Doubles
- San Marcos Open Aguascalientes

This was the first edition of the tournament.

Marc-Andrea Hüsler won the title after defeating Juan Pablo Ficovich 6–4, 4–6, 6–3 in the final.

== Seeds ==
1. (Slovakia) Andrej Martin (first round)
2. (Chile) Nicolás Jarry (quarterfinals)
3. (Switzerland) Marc-Andrea Hüsler (champion)
4. (United States) Ernesto Escobedo (second round)
5. (United Kingdom) Jay Clarke (second round)
6. (Netherlands) Tim van Rijthoven (first round)
7. (Italy) Federico Gaio (semifinals)
8. (Argentina) Juan Pablo Ficovich (final)

== Draw ==
Key

- Q = Qualifier
- WC = Wild card
- LL = Lucky loser
- Alt = Alternate
- ITF = ITF entry
- PR = Protected ranking
- SR = Special ranking
- SE = Special exempt
- JE = Junior exempt
- JR = Junior Accelerator Programme entrant
- CO = College Accelerator Programme entrant
- NG = Next Gen Accelerator Program entrant
- w/o = Walkover
- r = Retired
- d = Defaulted

=== Finals ===
Semifinals
(Romania) Filip Jianu	3	6^{4}
3	(Switzerland) Marc-Andrea Hüsler	6	7^{7}
7	(Italy) Federico Gaio	7^{8}	5	4
8	(Argentina) Juan Pablo Ficovich	6^{6}	7	6

Final
3	(Switzerland) Marc-Andrea Hüsler	6	4	6
8	(Argentina) Juan Pablo Ficovich	4	6	3

=== Top half ===
First round
1	(Slovakia) A Martin	6	3	5
Q	(Spain) A Menéndez Maceiras	4	6	7
Alt	(Australia) B Tomic	4	7^{7}	2
WC	(China) J Shang	6	6^{4}	1^{r}
Q	(Colombia) N Barrientos	6	6
LL	(Tunisia) M Jaziri	3	4
(Romania) FC Jianu	6	6
6	(Netherlands) T van Rijthoven	3	4
3	(Switzerland) M-A Hüsler	6	5	7
Alt	(Norway) V Durasovic	4	7	5
(Portugal) G Oliveira	3	4
(Colombia) N Mejía	6	6
(Germany) J Lenz	2	6^{4}
(France) A Cazaux	6	7^{7}
(Japan) Y Sugita	7	5	0
5	(United Kingdom) J Clarke	5	7	6

Second round
Q	(Spain) A Menéndez Maceiras	7^{7}	7
Alt	(Australia) B Tomic	6^{5}	5
Q	(Colombia) N Barrientos	5	2
(Romania) FC Jianu	7	6
3	(Switzerland) M-A Hüsler	3	6	6
(Colombia) N Mejía	6	3	4
(France) A Cazaux	4	6	6
5	(United Kingdom) J Clarke	6	4	1

Quarterfinals
Q	(Spain) A Menéndez Maceiras	4	3
(Romania) FC Jianu	6	6
3	(Switzerland) M-A Hüsler	6^{5}	6	7^{7}
(France) A Cazaux	7^{7}	3	6^{0}

Semifinals
(Romania) FC Jianu	3	6^{4}
3	(Switzerland) M-A Hüsler	6	7^{7}

=== Bottom half ===
First round
7	(Italy) F Gaio	6	6
(United Kingdom) P Jubb	4	1
SE	(Switzerland) A Bellier	6^{3}	7	3
(Uzbekistan) D Istomin	7^{7}	5	6
(Canada) S Diez	6	6
(Australia) R Hijikata	2	4
(Austria) G Melzer	3	6	3
4	(United States) E Escobedo	6	3	6
8	(Argentina) JP Ficovich	4	6	6
Q	(Germany) Elmar Ejupovic	6	0	3
WC	(Mexico) R Pacheco Méndez	4	4
Q	(Argentina) Matías Zukas	6	6
Q	(Japan) S Mochizuki	6	6
Q	(Australia) A Santillan	3	2
WC	(Mexico) Diego Balderas	3	0
2	(Chile) N Jarry	6	6

Second round
7	(Italy) F Gaio	6	6
(Uzbekistan) D Istomin	4	2
(Canada) S Diez	6	7^{7}
4	(United States) E Escobedo	4	6^{3}
8	(Argentina) JP Ficovich	6	6
Q	(Argentina) M Zukas	2	3
Q	(Japan) S Mochizuki	2	4
2	(Chile) N Jarry	6	6

Quarterfinals
7	(Italy) F Gaio	6^{2}	6	6
(Canada) S Diez	7^{7}	2	3
8	(Argentina) JP Ficovich	6	6
2	(Chile) N Jarry	3	2

Semifinals
7	(Italy) F Gaio	7^{8}	5	4
8	(Argentina) JP Ficovich	6^{6}	7	6
