= 2025 Yucatán Open =

- Date: 17–23 March
- Edition: 2nd
- Surface: Clay
- Location: Mérida, Mexico

Champions

Singles
- (Brazil) Felipe Meligeni Alves

Doubles
- (Switzerland) Kilian Feldbausch / (Mexico) Rodrigo Pacheco Méndez
- Yucatán Open

The 2025 Yucatán Open was a professional tennis tournament played on clay courts. It was the second edition of the tournament which was part of the 2025 ATP Challenger Tour. It took place in Mérida, Mexico, between 17 and 23 March 2025.

== Singles main draw entrants ==
=== Seeds ===
Country	Player	Rank^{1}	Seed
BOL	Hugo Dellien	103	1
CHI	Cristian Garín	138	2
ARG	Juan Pablo Ficovich	169	3
BRA	Felipe Meligeni Alves	179	4
AUS	Bernard Tomic	216	5
KAZ	Dmitry Popko	220	6
MEX	Rodrigo Pacheco Méndez	231	7
FRA	Enzo Couacaud	242	8

- ^{1} Rankings are as of 3 March 2025.

=== Other entrants ===
The following players received wildcards into the singles main draw:

- (Mexico) Rodrigo Alujas
- (Mexico) Alex Hernández
- (Colombia) Miguel Tobón

The following players received entry from the qualifying draw:

- (France) Robin Catry
- (United States) Trey Hilderbrand
- (Canada) Dan Martin
- (United States) Karl Poling
- (Mexico) Alan Fernando Rubio Fierros
- (United States) Joshua Sheehy

== Champions ==
=== Singles ===
- (Brazil) Felipe Meligeni Alves def. (Argentina) Juan Pablo Ficovich 6–2, 1–6, 6–2.

=== Doubles ===
- (Switzerland) Kilian Feldbausch / (Mexico) Rodrigo Pacheco Méndez def. (United States) George Goldhoff / (United States) Trey Hilderbrand 6–4, 6–2.
