= 2022 San Marcos Open Aguascalientes =

- Date: 18–24 April
- Edition: 1st
- Surface: Clay
- Location: Aguascalientes, Mexico

Champions

Singles
- (Switzerland) Marc-Andrea Hüsler

Doubles
- (Colombia) Nicolás Barrientos / (Mexico) Miguel Ángel Reyes-Varela
- San Marcos Open Aguascalientes

The 2022 San Marcos Open Aguascalientes was a professional tennis tournament played on clay courts. It was the 1st edition of the tournament which was part of the 2022 ATP Challenger Tour. It took place in Aguascalientes, Mexico between 18 and 24 April 2022.

== Singles main-draw entrants ==
=== Seeds ===
Country	Player	Rank^{1}	Seed
SVK	Andrej Martin	133	1
CHI	Nicolás Jarry	134	2
SUI	Marc-Andrea Hüsler	140	3
USA	Ernesto Escobedo	143	4
GBR	Jay Clarke	170	5
NED	Tim van Rijthoven	184	6
ITA	Federico Gaio	186	7
ARG	Juan Pablo Ficovich	205	8

- ^{1} Rankings as of April 11, 2022.

=== Other entrants ===
The following players received wildcards into the singles main draw:

- (Mexico) Diego Balderas
- (Mexico) Rodrigo Pacheco Méndez
- (China) Shang Juncheng

The following player received entry into the singles main draw as a special exempt:

- (Switzerland) Antoine Bellier

The following players received entry into the singles main draw as alternates:

- (Norway) Viktor Durasovic
- (Australia) Bernard Tomic

The following players received entry from the qualifying draw:

- (Colombia) Nicolás Barrientos
- (Germany) Elmar Ejupovic
- (Spain) Adrián Menéndez Maceiras
- (Japan) Shintaro Mochizuki
- (Australia) Akira Santillan
- (Argentina) Matías Zukas

The following player received entry as a lucky loser:

- (Tunisia) Malek Jaziri

== Champions ==
=== Singles ===
- (Switzerland) Marc-Andrea Hüsler def. (Argentina) Juan Pablo Ficovich 6–4, 4–6, 6–3.

=== Doubles ===
- (Colombia) Nicolás Barrientos / (Mexico) Miguel Ángel Reyes-Varela def. (Portugal) Gonçalo Oliveira / (India) Divij Sharan 7–5, 6–3.
