= 2023 Campeonato Internacional de Tênis de Campinas – Singles =

Singles
- 2023 Campeonato Internacional de Tênis de Campinas

Final
- Champion: (Brazil) Thiago Monteiro
- Runner-up: (Argentina) Camilo Ugo Carabelli
- Score: 3–6, 6–4, 6–4

Events
Singles	Doubles
← 2022 ·	Campeonato Internacional de Tênis de Campinas	· 2024 →

Jan Choinski was the defending champion but lost in the second round to Andrea Pellegrino.

Thiago Monteiro won the title after defeating Camilo Ugo Carabelli 3–6, 6–4, 6–4 in the final.

== Seeds ==
1. (Argentina) Federico Coria (second round)
2. (Argentina) Juan Manuel Cerúndolo (second round)
3. (Argentina) Facundo Díaz Acosta (second round)
4. (Argentina) Francisco Comesaña (second round, retired)
5. (United Kingdom) Jan Choinski (second round)
6. (Bolivia) Hugo Dellien (quarterfinals)
7. (Brazil) Felipe Meligeni Alves (second round)
8. (Argentina) Camilo Ugo Carabelli (final)

== Draw ==
=== Key ===
- Q = Qualifier
- WC = Wild card
- LL = Lucky loser
- Alt = Alternate
- SE = Special exempt
- PR = Protected ranking
- ITF = ITF entry
- JE = Junior exempt
- w/o = Walkover
- r = Retired
- d = Defaulted
- SR = Special ranking

=== Finals ===
Semifinals
(Italy) Andrea Pellegrino	2	1
8	(Argentina) Camilo Ugo Carabelli	6	6
(Brazil) Thiago Monteiro	6	6
(Italy) Luciano Darderi	2	1

Final
8	(Argentina) Camilo Ugo Carabelli	6	4	4
(Brazil) Thiago Monteiro	3	6	6

=== Top half ===
First round
1	(Argentina) F Coria	6	6^{4}	6
Q	(Brazil) Wilson Leite	2	7^{7}	1
Q	(Brazil) O Luz	6	6
(Argentina) A Collarini	3	2
(Argentina) M Trungelliti	4	0^{r}
(Italy) A Pellegrino	6	1
Alt	(Brazil) JL Reis da Silva	6	2	1
5	(United Kingdom) J Choinski	4	6	6
4	(Argentina) F Comesaña	7	0	6
(Dominican Republic) N Hardt	5	6	2
Q	(Brazil) P Sakamoto	5	3
Q	(Brazil) J Pereira	7	6
(Argentina) G Andreozzi	6	3	7
(Argentina) JP Ficovich	4	6	5
Q	(Brazil) Igor Gimenez	0	3
8	(Argentina) C Ugo Carabelli	6	6

Second round
1	(Argentina) F Coria	3	6	3
Q	(Brazil) O Luz	6	3	6
(Italy) A Pellegrino	6	3	6
5	(United Kingdom) J Choinski	4	6	3
4	(Argentina) F Comesaña	4^{r}
Q	(Brazil) J Pereira	3
(Argentina) G Andreozzi	3	2
8	(Argentina) C Ugo Carabelli	6	6

Quarterfinals
Q	(Brazil) O Luz	3	6	3
(Italy) A Pellegrino	6	0	6
Q	(Brazil) J Pereira	6	1	1
8	(Argentina) C Ugo Carabelli	4	6	6

Semifinals
(Italy) A Pellegrino	2	1
8	(Argentina) C Ugo Carabelli	6	6

=== Bottom half ===
First round
6	(Bolivia) H Dellien	6	6
WC	(Brazil) E Ribeiro	1	3
WC	(Brazil) Enzo Lima	5	7	2
(Argentina) S Rodríguez Taverna	7	5	6
SE	(Brazil) G Heide	3	0^{r}
(Brazil) T Monteiro	6	1
(Argentina) F Delbonis	3	6	3
3	(Argentina) F Díaz Acosta	6	3	6
7	(Brazil) F Meligeni Alves	6	7^{7}
Q	(Brazil) D Dutra da Silva	2	6^{4}
(Argentina) RA Burruchaga	4	6	6
WC	(Brazil) Nicolas Zanellato	6	4	2
(Italy) L Darderi	6	6
Alt	(Brazil) M Pucinelli de Almeida	1	4
Alt	(Bolivia) M Dellien	3	0^{r}
2	(Argentina) JM Cerúndolo	6	0

Second round
6	(Bolivia) H Dellien	6	6
(Argentina) S Rodríguez Taverna	2	3
(Brazil) T Monteiro	3	6	6
3	(Argentina) F Díaz Acosta	6	1	3
7	(Brazil) F Meligeni Alves	6	3	0
(Argentina) RA Burruchaga	4	6	6
(Italy) L Darderi	6	6
2	(Argentina) JM Cerúndolo	2	4

Quarterfinals
6	(Bolivia) H Dellien	7^{7}	4	3
(Brazil) T Monteiro	6^{5}	6	6
(Argentina) RA Burruchaga	1	3
(Italy) L Darderi	6	6

Semifinals
(Brazil) T Monteiro	6	6
(Italy) L Darderi	2	1
