= 2024 Campeonato Internacional de Tênis de Campinas – Singles =

Singles
- 2024 Campeonato Internacional de Tênis de Campinas

Final
- Champion: (United States) Tristan Boyer
- Runner-up: (Argentina) Juan Pablo Ficovich
- Score: 6–2, 3–6, 6–3

Events
Singles	Doubles
← 2023 ·	Campeonato Internacional de Tênis de Campinas	· 2025 →

Thiago Monteiro was the defending champion but chose not to defend his title.

Tristan Boyer won the title after defeating Juan Pablo Ficovich 6–2, 3–6, 6–3 in the final.

== Seeds ==
1. (Argentina) Federico Coria (first round)
2. (Argentina) Francisco Comesaña (second round)
3. (Bolivia) Hugo Dellien (second round)
4. (Argentina) Camilo Ugo Carabelli (semifinals, retired)
5. (Argentina) Román Andrés Burruchaga (quarterfinals)
6. (Argentina) Federico Agustín Gómez (first round)
7. (Portugal) Henrique Rocha (second round)
8. (Brazil) Felipe Meligeni Alves (first round)

== Draw ==
=== Key ===
- Q = Qualifier
- WC = Wild card
- LL = Lucky loser
- Alt = Alternate
- ITF = ITF entry
- PR = Protected ranking
- SR = Special ranking
- SE = Special exempt
- JE = Junior exempt
- JR = Junior Accelerator Programme entrant
- CO = College Accelerator Programme entrant
- NG = Next Gen Accelerator Program entrant
- w/o = Walkover
- r = Retired
- d = Defaulted

=== Finals ===
Semifinals
(United States) Tristan Boyer	6	5
4	(Argentina) Camilo Ugo Carabelli	3	4^{r}
Alt	(Ecuador) Álvaro Guillén Meza	2	4
(Argentina) Juan Pablo Ficovich	6	6

Final
(United States) Tristan Boyer	6	3	6
(Argentina) Juan Pablo Ficovich	2	6	3

=== Top half ===
First round
1	(Argentina) F Coria	6	1	4
(Argentina) S Rodríguez Taverna	3	6	6
(United States) T Boyer	6	6^{0}	6
Q	(Argentina) JB Torres	4	7^{7}	4
Q	(Portugal) G Elias	0	6	4
Q	(Bolivia) JC Prado Ángelo	6	3	6
WC	(Brazil) Matheus Bueres	2	4
7	(Portugal) H Rocha	6	6
4	(Argentina) C Ugo Carabelli	6^{3}	6	6
(Brazil) G Heide	7^{7}	2	3
WC	(Brazil) D Dutra da Silva	5	3
Q	(Brazil) K Sell	7	6
(Paraguay) AD Vallejo	4	0
Q	(Brazil) M Pucinelli de Almeida	6	6
(Chile) T Barrios Vera	6	6
8	(Brazil) F Meligeni Alves	1	1

Second round
(Argentina) S Rodríguez Taverna	6	1	5
(United States) T Boyer	2	6	7
Q	(Bolivia) JC Prado Ángelo	7^{13}	6
7	(Portugal) H Rocha	6^{11}	4
4	(Argentina) C Ugo Carabelli	6	1	6
Q	(Brazil) K Sell	3	6	1
Q	(Brazil) M Pucinelli de Almeida	6^{6}	1
(Chile) T Barrios Vera	7^{8}	6

Quarterfinals
(United States) T Boyer	6	0	6
Q	(Bolivia) JC Prado Ángelo	4	6	3
4	(Argentina) C Ugo Carabelli	6	6
(Chile) T Barrios Vera	1	0

Semifinals
(United States) T Boyer	6	5
4	(Argentina) C Ugo Carabelli	3	4^{r}

=== Bottom half ===
First round
6	(Argentina) FA Gómez	3	2
Alt	(Brazil) P Sakamoto	6	6
(Peru) JP Varilas	4	6	6
(Peru) G Bueno	6	4	3
LL	(Argentina) V Aboian	3	1
Alt	(Ecuador) A Guillén Meza	6	6
(Portugal) J Faria	1	1
3	(Bolivia) H Dellien	6	6
5	(Argentina) RA Burruchaga	6	6
(Argentina) A Collarini	4	2
Q	(Chile) M Soto	5	3
(Bolivia) M Dellien	7	6
(Argentina) JP Ficovich	6	3	7^{8}
WC	(Brazil) M Alves	2	6	6^{6}
Alt	(Lebanon) H Habib	5	4
2	(Argentina) F Comesaña	7	6

Second round
Alt	(Brazil) P Sakamoto	5	6	4
(Peru) JP Varilas	7	4	6
Alt	(Ecuador) A Guillén Meza	6	1	6
3	(Bolivia) H Dellien	2	6	4
5	(Argentina) RA Burruchaga	6	6
(Bolivia) M Dellien	0	2
(Argentina) JP Ficovich	6	6
2	(Argentina) F Comesaña	4	3

Quarterfinals
(Peru) JP Varilas	3	6	4
Alt	(Ecuador) A Guillén Meza	6	4	6
5	(Argentina) RA Burruchaga	6	2	4
(Argentina) JP Ficovich	1	6	6

Semifinals
Alt	(Ecuador) A Guillén Meza	2	4
(Argentina) JP Ficovich	6	6
