= 2026 Banorte Tennis Open – Doubles =

Doubles
- 2026 Banorte Tennis Open

Final
- Champions: (Australia) Jake Delaney (Australia) Tristan Schoolkate
- Runners-up: (Argentina) Facundo Mena (Mexico) Rodrigo Pacheco Méndez
- Score: 6–4, 7–6^{(7–2)}

Events
Singles	Doubles
- Banorte Tennis Open

Ivan Liutarevich and Marcus Willis were the defending champions but chose not to defend their title.

Jake Delaney and Tristan Schoolkate won the title after defeating Facundo Mena and Rodrigo Pacheco Méndez 6–4, 7–6^{(7–2)} in the final.

== Seeds ==
1. (Mexico) Miguel Ángel Reyes-Varela / (Bolivia) Federico Zeballos (first round)
2. (Australia) Patrick Harper / (United States) Theodore Winegar (first round)
3. (Argentina) Facundo Mena / (Mexico) Rodrigo Pacheco Méndez (final)
4. (Switzerland) Marc-Andrea Hüsler / (Netherlands) Thijmen Loof (semifinals)

== Draw ==
Key

- Q = Qualifier
- WC = Wild card
- LL = Lucky loser
- Alt = Alternate
- ITF = ITF entry
- PR = Protected ranking
- SR = Special ranking
- SE = Special exempt
- JE = Junior exempt
- JR = Junior Accelerator Programme entrant
- CO = College Accelerator Programme entrant
- NG = Next Gen Accelerator Program entrant
- w/o = Walkover
- r = Retired
- d = Defaulted

First round
1	(Mexico) M Reyes-Varela (Bolivia) F Zeballos	3	4
(Australia) Ja Delaney (Australia) T Schoolkate	6	6
WC	(Mexico) A Hernández (Mexico) A Magadán	6	4	[10]
(Italy) S Napolitano (France) L Pavlovic	4	6	[8]
4	(Switzerland) M-A Hüsler (Netherlands) T Loof	7^{8}	6
PR	(Antigua and Barbuda) J Maginley (United States) N Moreno de Alboran	6^{6}	3
(United States) Maxwell McKennon (Colombia) Miguel Tobón	7	3	[10]
(France) Robin Catry (France) C Denolly	5	6	[6]
(United States) A Ayeni (Ukraine) V Orlov	5	6	[10]
WC	(Mexico) AF Rubio Fierros (Mexico) M Sánchez	7	2	[8]
(United States) P Kumar (United States) K Poling	6^{1}	1
3	(Argentina) F Mena (Mexico) R Pacheco Méndez	7^{7}	6
(Spain) Iván Marrero Curbelo (Canada) D Martin	6	6
(Belgium) T Colson (Germany) P Zahraj	1	4
(Brazil) M Alves (Chile) M Soto	3	6	[10]
2	(Australia) P Harper (United States) T Winegar	6	3	[7]

Quarterfinals
(Australia) Ja Delaney (Australia) T Schoolkate	6	6
WC	(Mexico) A Hernández (Mexico) A Magadán	2	0
4	(Switzerland) M-A Hüsler (Netherlands) T Loof	6	6
(United States) M McKennon (Colombia) M Tobón	3	1
(United States) A Ayeni (Ukraine) V Orlov	2	4
3	(Argentina) F Mena (Mexico) R Pacheco Méndez	6	6
(Spain) I Marrero Curbelo (Canada) D Martin	7	3	[6]
(Brazil) M Alves (Chile) M Soto	5	6	[10]

Semifinals
(Australia) Ja Delaney (Australia) T Schoolkate	6	7
4	(Switzerland) M-A Hüsler (Netherlands) T Loof	3	5
3	(Argentina) F Mena (Mexico) R Pacheco Méndez	7	7^{7}
(Brazil) M Alves (Chile) M Soto	5	6^{3}

Final
(Australia) Ja Delaney (Australia) T Schoolkate	6	7^{7}
3	(Argentina) F Mena (Mexico) R Pacheco Méndez	4	6^{2}
