= 2025 Campeonato Internacional de Tênis de Campinas – Doubles =

Doubles
- 2025 Campeonato Internacional de Tênis de Campinas

Final
- Champions: (Argentina) Mariano Kestelboim (Argentina) Gonzalo Villanueva
- Runners-up: (Japan) Seita Watanabe (Japan) Takeru Yuzuki
- Score: 6–2, 7–6^{(7–5)}

Events
Singles	Doubles
← 2024 ·	Campeonato Internacional de Tênis de Campinas	· 2026 →

Mateus Alves and Orlando Luz were the defending champions but chose not to defend their title.

Mariano Kestelboim and Gonzalo Villanueva won the title after defeating Seita Watanabe and Takeru Yuzuki 6–2, 7–6^{(7–5)} in the final.

== Seeds ==
1. (Bolivia) Boris Arias / (Bolivia) Federico Zeballos (semifinals)
2. (Japan) Seita Watanabe / (Japan) Takeru Yuzuki (final)
3. (Argentina) Guillermo Durán / (Colombia) Cristian Rodríguez (quarterfinals)
4. (Argentina) Mariano Kestelboim / (Argentina) Gonzalo Villanueva (champions)

== Draw ==
=== Key ===
- Q = Qualifier
- WC = Wild card
- LL = Lucky loser
- Alt = Alternate
- ITF = ITF entry
- PR = Protected ranking
- SR = Special ranking
- SE = Special exempt
- JE = Junior exempt
- JR = Junior Accelerator Programme entrant
- CO = College Accelerator Programme entrant
- NG = Next Gen Accelerator Program entrant
- w/o = Walkover
- r = Retired
- d = Defaulted

=== Draw ===
First round
1	(Bolivia) B Arias (Bolivia) F Zeballos	6	7
(Brazil) L Britto (Brazil) João Eduardo Schiessl	2	5
(Brazil) M Barreiros Reyes (Bulgaria) P Nesterov	7^{7}	1	[10]
(Brazil) D Dutra da Silva (Brazil) P Sakamoto	6^{5}	6	[7]
4	(Argentina) M Kestelboim (Argentina) G Villanueva	6	6
Alt	(Brazil) Breno Braga (Brazil) Victor Hugo Remondy Pagotto	1	3
Alt	(Japan) Yuki Mochizuki (Japan) Kosuke Ogura	1	6^{3}
(Uruguay) I Carou (Chile) M Soto	6	7^{7}
WC	(Brazil) Gustavo Albieri (Brazil) Enzo Camargo Lima	0	3
(France) E Couacaud (Brazil) Gabriel Roveri Sidney	6	6
(Ukraine) V Orlov (Brazil) PA Saraiva dos Santos	6^{3}	4
3	(Argentina) G Durán (Colombia) C Rodríguez	7^{7}	6
(Peru) A Huertas del Pino (Peru) C Huertas del Pino	6^{3}	3
WC	(Brazil) Gustavo Ribeiro de Almeida (Brazil) E Ribeiro	7^{7}	6
(Brazil) P Boscardin Dias (Brazil) JL Reis da Silva	4	2
2	(Japan) S Watanabe (Japan) T Yuzuki	6	6

Quarterfinals
1	(Bolivia) B Arias (Bolivia) F Zeballos	6	3	[10]
(Brazil) M Barreiros Reyes (Bulgaria) P Nesterov	4	6	[6]
4	(Argentina) M Kestelboim (Argentina) G Villanueva	6	4	[10]
(Uruguay) I Carou (Chile) M Soto	4	6	[7]
(France) E Couacaud (Brazil) G Roveri Sidney	3	7^{8}	[15]
3	(Argentina) G Durán (Colombia) C Rodríguez	6	6^{6}	[13]
WC	(Brazil) GR de Almeida (Brazil) E Ribeiro	5	0
2	(Japan) S Watanabe (Japan) T Yuzuki	7	6

Semifinals
1	(Bolivia) B Arias (Bolivia) F Zeballos	3	6^{4}
4	(Argentina) M Kestelboim (Argentina) G Villanueva	6	7^{7}
(France) E Couacaud (Brazil) G Roveri Sidney	4	7	[5]
2	(Japan) S Watanabe (Japan) T Yuzuki	6	5	[10]

Final
4	(Argentina) M Kestelboim (Argentina) G Villanueva	6	7^{7}
2	(Japan) S Watanabe (Japan) T Yuzuki	2	6^{5}
