= 2024 Campeonato Internacional de Tênis de Campinas =

- Date: 14–20 October
- Edition: 13th
- Surface: Clay
- Location: Campinas, Brazil

Champions

Singles
- (United States) Tristan Boyer

Doubles
- (Brazil) Mateus Alves / (Brazil) Orlando Luz
← 2023 ·	Campeonato Internacional de Tênis de Campinas	· 2025 →

The 2024 Campeonato Internacional de Tênis was a professional tennis tournament played on clay courts. It was the 13th edition of the tournament which was part of the 2024 ATP Challenger Tour. It took place in Campinas, Brazil between 14 and 20 October 2024.

== Singles main-draw entrants ==
=== Seeds ===
Country	Player	Rank^{1}	Seed
ARG	Federico Coria	94	1
ARG	Francisco Comesaña	104	2
BOL	Hugo Dellien	108	3
ARG	Camilo Ugo Carabelli	112	4
ARG	Román Andrés Burruchaga	130	5
ARG	Federico Agustín Gómez	160	6
POR	Henrique Rocha	163	7
BRA	Felipe Meligeni Alves	165	8

- ^{1} Rankings as of 30 September 2024.

=== Other entrants ===
The following players received wildcards into the singles main draw:

- (Brazil) Mateus Alves
- (Brazil) Matheus Bueres
- (Brazil) Daniel Dutra da Silva

The following players received entry into the singles main draw as alternates:

- (Ecuador) Álvaro Guillén Meza
- (Lebanon) Hady Habib
- (Brazil) Pedro Sakamoto

The following players received entry from the qualifying draw:

- (Portugal) Gastão Elias
- (Bolivia) Juan Carlos Prado Ángelo
- (Brazil) Matheus Pucinelli de Almeida
- (Brazil) Karue Sell
- (Chile) Matías Soto
- (Argentina) Juan Bautista Torres

The following player received entry as a lucky loser:

- (Argentina) Valerio Aboian

== Champions ==
=== Singles ===
- (United States) Tristan Boyer def. (Argentina) Juan Pablo Ficovich 6–2, 3–6, 6–3.

=== Doubles ===
- (Brazil) Mateus Alves / (Brazil) Orlando Luz def. (Chile) Tomás Barrios Vera / (Argentina) Facundo Mena 6–3, 6–4.
