= 2025 Campeonato Internacional de Tênis de Campinas – Singles =

Singles
- 2025 Campeonato Internacional de Tênis de Campinas

Final
- Champion: (Chile) Tomás Barrios Vera
- Runner-up: (Ecuador) Álvaro Guillén Meza
- Score: 6–4, 6–3

Events
Singles	Doubles
- Campeonato Internacional de Tênis de Campinas

Tristan Boyer was the defending champion but chose not to defend his title.

Tomás Barrios Vera won the title after defeating Álvaro Guillén Meza 6–4, 6–3 in the final.

== Seeds ==
1. (Chile) Tomás Barrios Vera (champion)
2. (Argentina) Facundo Mena (second round)
3. (Argentina) Andrea Collarini (second round)
4. (Peru) Juan Pablo Varillas (semifinals)
5. (France) Enzo Couacaud (second round)
6. (Chile) Matías Soto (semifinals)
7. (Ecuador) Álvaro Guillén Meza (final)
8. (Peru) Gonzalo Bueno (quarterfinals)

== Draw ==
Key

- Q = Qualifier
- WC = Wild card
- LL = Lucky loser
- Alt = Alternate
- ITF = ITF entry
- PR = Protected ranking
- SR = Special ranking
- SE = Special exempt
- JE = Junior exempt
- JR = Junior Accelerator Programme entrant
- CO = College Accelerator Programme entrant
- NG = Next Gen Accelerator Program entrant
- w/o = Walkover
- r = Retired
- d = Defaulted

=== Finals ===
Semifinals
1	(Chile) Tomás Barrios Vera	6	6
4	(Peru) Juan Pablo Varillas	3	1
7	(Ecuador) Álvaro Guillén Meza	6	6
6	(Chile) Matías Soto	1	2

Final
1	(Chile) Tomás Barrios Vera	6	6
7	(Ecuador) Álvaro Guillén Meza	4	3

=== Top half ===
First round
1	(Chile) T Barrios Vera	6	4	6
(Argentina) LE Ambrogi	1	6	4
(Argentina) R Olivo	3	2
(Brazil) JL Reis da Silva	6	6
(Brazil) P Boscardin Dias	3	5
WC	(Brazil) E Ribeiro	6	7
(Switzerland) R Bertola	4	0
5	(France) E Couacaud	6	6
4	(Peru) JP Varillas	6	7
(Argentina) JB Torres	4	5
Q	(Japan) Yuki Mochizuki	2	2
(Brazil) M Pucinelli de Almeida	6	6
(Brazil) P Sakamoto	6	6
Q	(Argentina) Ignacio Monzón	4	2
Q	(Chile) Daniel Antonio Núñez	2	6	3
8	(Peru) G Bueno	6	4	6

Second round
1	(Chile) T Barrios Vera	7	2	6
(Brazil) JL Reis da Silva	5	6	2
WC	(Brazil) E Ribeiro	6	6
5	(France) E Couacaud	2	4
4	(Peru) JP Varillas	6^{4}	7	6
(Brazil) M Pucinelli de Almeida	7^{7}	5	2
(Brazil) P Sakamoto	3	6	0
8	(Peru) G Bueno	6	4	6

Quarterfinals
1	(Chile) T Barrios Vera	6	6
WC	(Brazil) E Ribeiro	3	3
4	(Peru) JP Varillas	6	6
8	(Peru) G Bueno	3	1

Semifinals
1	(Chile) T Barrios Vera	6	6
4	(Peru) JP Varillas	3	1

=== Bottom half ===
First round
7	(Ecuador) Á Guillén Meza	6	6
WC	(Brazil) Gustavo Ribeiro de Almeida	4	4
Alt	(Argentina) M Kestelboim	7	6
(Argentina) GI Justo	5	1
(Bolivia) JC Prado Ángelo	6	6
(Bulgaria) P Nesterov	2	4
Alt	(Brazil) J Pereira	4	3
3	(Argentina) A Collarini	6	6
6	(Chile) M Soto	7^{7}	6
(Argentina) G Villanueva	6^{4}	3
Q	(Peru) C Huertas del Pino	4	6	6
WC	(Brazil) Gustavo Albieri	6	1	2
Q	(Brazil) Enzo Camargo Lima	3	4
(Brazil) D Dutra da Silva	6	6
Q	(Thailand) M Jones	2	4
2	(Argentina) F Mena	6	6

Second round
7	(Ecuador) Á Guillén Meza	6	7
Alt	(Argentina) M Kestelboim	2	5
(Bolivia) JC Prado Ángelo	2	6	6
3	(Argentina) A Collarini	6	2	1
6	(Chile) M Soto	4	6	7^{7}
Q	(Peru) C Huertas del Pino	6	4	6^{2}
(Brazil) D Dutra da Silva	6	6
2	(Argentina) F Mena	2	2

Quarterfinals
7	(Ecuador) Á Guillén Meza	6	2	6
(Bolivia) JC Prado Ángelo	2	6	1
6	(Chile) M Soto	6^{5}	7^{7}	6
(Brazil) D Dutra da Silva	7^{7}	6^{5}	2

Semifinals
7	(Ecuador) Á Guillén Meza	6	6
6	(Chile) M Soto	1	2
