= 2023 Campeonato Internacional de Tênis de Campinas =

- Date: 2–8 October
- Edition: 12th
- Surface: Clay
- Location: Campinas, Brazil

Champions

Singles
- (Brazil) Thiago Monteiro

Doubles
- (Argentina) Guido Andreozzi / (Argentina) Guillermo Durán
← 2022 ·	Campeonato Internacional de Tênis de Campinas	· 2024 →

The 2023 Campeonato Internacional de Tênis was a professional tennis tournament played on clay courts. It was the 12th edition of the tournament which was part of the 2023 ATP Challenger Tour. It took place in Campinas, Brazil between 2 and 8 October 2023.

== Singles main-draw entrants ==
=== Seeds ===
Country	Player	Rank^{1}	Seed
ARG	Federico Coria	83	1
ARG	Juan Manuel Cerúndolo	88	2
ARG	Facundo Díaz Acosta	105	3
ARG	Francisco Comesaña	127	4
GBR	Jan Choinski	128	5
BOL	Hugo Dellien	136	6
BRA	Felipe Meligeni Alves	142	7
ARG	Camilo Ugo Carabelli	151	8

- ^{1} Rankings as of 25 September 2023.

=== Other entrants ===
The following players received wildcards into the singles main draw:

- (Brazil) Enzo Lima
- (Brazil) Eduardo Ribeiro
- (Brazil) Nicolas Zanellato

The following player received entry into the singles main draw as a special exempt:

- (Brazil) Gustavo Heide

The following players received entry into the singles main draw as alternates:

- (Bolivia) Murkel Dellien
- (Brazil) Matheus Pucinelli de Almeida
- (Brazil) João Lucas Reis da Silva

The following players received entry from the qualifying draw:

- (Brazil) Daniel Dutra da Silva
- (Brazil) Igor Gimenez
- (Brazil) Wilson Leite
- (Brazil) Orlando Luz
- (Brazil) José Pereira
- (Brazil) Pedro Sakamoto

== Champions ==
=== Singles ===
- (Brazil) Thiago Monteiro def. (Argentina) Camilo Ugo Carabelli 3–6, 6–4, 6–4.

=== Doubles ===
- (Argentina) Guido Andreozzi / (Argentina) Guillermo Durán def. (Ecuador) Diego Hidalgo / (Colombia) Cristian Rodríguez 7–6^{(7–4)}, 6–3.
