= 2023 Campeonato Internacional de Tênis de Campinas – Doubles =

Doubles
- 2023 Campeonato Internacional de Tênis de Campinas

Final
- Champions: (Argentina) Guido Andreozzi (Argentina) Guillermo Durán
- Runners-up: (Ecuador) Diego Hidalgo (Colombia) Cristian Rodríguez
- Score: 7–6^{(7–4)}, 6–3

Events
Singles	Doubles
← 2022 ·	Campeonato Internacional de Tênis de Campinas	· 2024 →

Boris Arias and Federico Zeballos were the defending champions but lost in the semifinals to Diego Hidalgo and Cristian Rodríguez.

Guido Andreozzi and Guillermo Durán won the title after defeating Hidalgo and Rodríguez 7–6^{(7–4)}, 6–3 in the final.

== Seeds ==
1. (Argentina) Guido Andreozzi / (Argentina) Guillermo Durán (champions)
2. (Bolivia) Boris Arias / (Bolivia) Federico Zeballos (semifinals)
3. (Ecuador) Diego Hidalgo / (Colombia) Cristian Rodríguez (final)
4. (Brazil) Fernando Romboli / (Brazil) Marcelo Zormann (semifinals)

== Draw ==
=== Key ===
- Q = Qualifier
- WC = Wild card
- LL = Lucky loser
- Alt = Alternate
- SE = Special exempt
- PR = Protected ranking
- ITF = ITF entry
- JE = Junior exempt
- w/o = Walkover
- r = Retired
- d = Defaulted
- SR = Special ranking

First round
1	(Argentina) G Andreozzi (Argentina) G Durán	6	6
WC	(Brazil) Matheus Bueres (Brazil) Gabriel Tumasonis	1	2
(Brazil) Igor Gimenez (Brazil) Nicolas Zanellato	1	2
WC	(Brazil) Gilbert Klier Júnior (Brazil) M Pucinelli de Almeida	6	6
4	(Brazil) F Romboli (Brazil) M Zormann	w/o
Alt	(Brazil) Enzo Lima (Brazil) J Pereira
(Brazil) D Dutra da Silva (Brazil) JL Reis da Silva	6	5	[7]
Alt	(Brazil) PA Saraiva dos Santos (Brazil) Rafael Tosetto	1	7	[10]
(Argentina) RA Burruchaga (Argentina) F Delbonis	7^{8}	6
(Brazil) M Alves (Brazil) Gabriel Roveri Sidney	6^{6}	3
(Brazil) O Luz (Brazil) E Ribeiro	5	6^{2}
3	(Ecuador) D Hidalgo (Colombia) C Rodríguez	7	7^{7}
(Italy) L Darderi (Italy) A Pellegrino	6	6
(Switzerland) L Margaroli (Argentina) S Rodríguez Taverna	3	4
Alt	(Brazil) Wilson Leite (Brazil) P Sakamoto	1	0
2	(Bolivia) B Arias (Bolivia) F Zeballos	6	6

Quarterfinals
1	(Argentina) G Andreozzi (Argentina) G Durán	6	7^{7}
WC	(Brazil) G Klier Júnior (Brazil) M Pucinelli de Almeida	4	6^{3}
4	(Brazil) F Romboli (Brazil) M Zormann	6	4	[10]
Alt	(Brazil) PA Saraiva dos Santos (Brazil) R Tosetto	1	6	[6]
(Argentina) RA Burruchaga (Argentina) F Delbonis	0	2
3	(Ecuador) D Hidalgo (Colombia) C Rodríguez	6	6
(Italy) L Darderi (Italy) A Pellegrino	4	3
2	(Bolivia) B Arias (Bolivia) F Zeballos	6	6

Semifinals
1	(Argentina) G Andreozzi (Argentina) G Durán	6	5	[10]
4	(Brazil) F Romboli (Brazil) M Zormann	1	7	[7]
3	(Ecuador) D Hidalgo (Colombia) C Rodríguez	6	7
2	(Bolivia) B Arias (Bolivia) F Zeballos	2	5

Final
1	(Argentina) G Andreozzi (Argentina) G Durán	7^{7}	6
3	(Ecuador) D Hidalgo (Colombia) C Rodríguez	6^{4}	3
