= 2025 French Open – Men's singles qualifying =

Men's singles qualifying
- 2025 French Open

Events
Singles	men	women		boys	girls
Doubles	men	women	mixed	boys	girls
WC Singles	men	women	quad
WC Doubles	men	women	quad

Qualification
Singles	men	women
- French Open

The 2025 French Open – Men's singles qualifying are series of tennis matches that took place from 19 to 23 May 2025 that determined the sixteen qualifiers into the main draw of the men's singles tournament.

Benjamin Hassan became the first Lebanese player to qualify for the French Open in the Open Era. This was the first time 2014 US Open champion Marin Čilić contested the qualifying competition of a major since the 2007 US Open. He lost in the qualifying competition round to Lloyd Harris, but entered the main draw as a lucky loser.

Only 16 out of the 128 qualifiers who compete in this knock-out tournament, secure a main draw place.

== Seeds ==
All seeds are per ATP rankings as of 5 May 2025.

1. (Croatia) Borna Ćorić (first round)
2. (Kazakhstan) Alexander Shevchenko (qualifying competition, lucky loser)
3. (United States) Nishesh Basavareddy (first round)
4. (Chinese Taipei) Tseng Chun-hsin (first round)
5. (United States) Brandon Holt (first round)
6. (United Kingdom) Billy Harris (first round)
7. (Italy) Fabio Fognini (first round)
8. (Croatia) Marin Čilić (qualifying competition, lucky loser)
9. (United States) Christopher Eubanks (first round)
10. (Denmark) Elmer Møller (qualifying competition, lucky loser)
11. (United States) Ethan Quinn (qualified)
12. (Argentina) Juan Manuel Cerúndolo (qualified)
13. (Chile) Tomás Barrios Vera (second round)
14. (Brazil) Thiago Seyboth Wild (second round)
15. (United States) Eliot Spizzirri (second round)
16. (United States) Tristan Boyer (second round)
17. (Brazil) Felipe Meligeni Alves (first round)
18. (Colombia) Daniel Elahi Galán (qualifying competition, lucky loser)
19. (Germany) Yannick Hanfmann (qualified)
20. (France) Adrian Mannarino (first round)
21. (Switzerland) Jérôme Kym (first round)
22. (Czech Republic) Dalibor Svrčina (second round)
23. (Finland) Otto Virtanen (second round)
24. (Argentina) Thiago Agustín Tirante (qualifying competition, lucky loser)
25. (Argentina) Román Andrés Burruchaga (second round)
26. Pavel Kotov (first round)
27. (Japan) Taro Daniel (first round)
28. (Spain) Carlos Taberner (first round)
29. (Argentina) Federico Agustín Gómez (qualifying competition, lucky loser)
30. (Argentina) Federico Coria (second round, retired)
31. (Canada) Liam Draxl (first round)
32. (France) Harold Mayot (first round)

== Qualifiers ==
1. (Germany) Yannick Hanfmann
2. (Austria) Filip Misolic
3. (Spain) Albert Ramos Viñolas
4. (Germany) Maximilian Marterer
5. (Lebanon) Benjamin Hassan
6. (France) Clément Tabur
7. (France) Ugo Blanchet
8. (South Africa) Lloyd Harris
9. (France) Kyrian Jacquet
10. (Italy) Matteo Gigante
11. (United States) Ethan Quinn
12. (Argentina) Juan Manuel Cerúndolo
13. (Portugal) Henrique Rocha
14. (Georgia (country)) Nikoloz Basilashvili
15. (Italy) Giulio Zeppieri
16. (Spain) Pablo Llamas Ruiz

== Lucky losers ==
1. (Kazakhstan) Alexander Shevchenko
2. (Croatia) Marin Čilić
3. (Denmark) Elmer Møller
4. (Argentina) Thiago Agustín Tirante
5. (Argentina) Federico Agustín Gómez
6. (Colombia) Daniel Elahi Galán

== Draw ==
Key

- Q = Qualifier
- WC = Wild card
- LL = Lucky loser
- Alt = Alternate
- ITF = ITF entry
- PR = Protected ranking
- SR = Special ranking
- SE = Special exempt
- JE = Junior exempt
- JR = Junior Accelerator Programme entrant
- CO = College Accelerator Programme entrant
- NG = Next Gen Accelerator Program entrant
- w/o = Walkover
- r = Retired
- d = Defaulted

=== First qualifier ===
First round
1	(Croatia) Borna Ćorić	7	6^{9}	2
(France) Titouan Droguet	5	7^{11}	6
WC	(France) Arthur Géa	4	6	6
(Belgium) Alexander Blockx	6	4	3
(Canada) Alexis Galarneau	6^{5}	6	3
WC	(France) Matteo Martineau	7^{7}	2	6
(Peru) Ignacio Buse	2	6	3
19	(Germany) Yannick Hanfmann	6	4	6

Second round
(France) Titouan Droguet	7	4	6
WC	(France) Arthur Géa	5	6	1
WC	(France) Matteo Martineau	4	4
19	(Germany) Yannick Hanfmann	6	6

Qualifying competition
(France) Titouan Droguet	4	6	3
19	(Germany) Yannick Hanfmann	6	3	6

=== Second qualifier ===
First round
2	(Kazakhstan) Alexander Shevchenko	6^{2}	6	6
(Japan) Shintaro Mochizuki	7^{7}	2	4
(Australia) James McCabe	1	1
WC	(France) Mathys Erhard	6	6
(Argentina) Marco Trungelliti	3	3
(Austria) Lukas Neumayer	6	6
(Austria) Filip Misolic	6	6
31	(Canada) Liam Draxl	2	2

Second round
2	(Kazakhstan) Alexander Shevchenko	3	6	7^{10}
WC	(France) Mathys Erhard	6	3	6^{5}
(Austria) Lukas Neumayer	6^{5}	5
(Austria) Filip Misolic	7^{7}	7

Qualifying competition
2	(Kazakhstan) Alexander Shevchenko	4	4
(Austria) Filip Misolic	6	6

=== Third qualifier ===
First round
3	(United States) Nishesh Basavareddy	5	7	4
(Argentina) Andrea Collarini	7	5	6
(Mexico) Rodrigo Pacheco Méndez	4	3
(Ecuador) Álvaro Guillén Meza	6	6
(Uzbekistan) Khumoyun Sultanov	1	1
(Spain) Albert Ramos Viñolas	6	6
(France) Constant Lestienne	3	6^{6}
25	(Argentina) Román Andrés Burruchaga	6	7^{8}

Second round
(Argentina) Andrea Collarini	6	7^{7}
(Ecuador) Álvaro Guillén Meza	3	6^{4}
(Spain) Albert Ramos Viñolas	6	7^{7}
25	(Argentina) Román Andrés Burruchaga	4	6^{0}

Qualifying competition
(Argentina) Andrea Collarini	2	1
(Spain) Albert Ramos Viñolas	6	6

=== Fourth qualifier ===
First round
4	(Chinese Taipei) Tseng Chun-hsin	3	6	3
(Italy) Federico Arnaboldi	6	3	6
PR	(United States) Michael Mmoh	6^{3}	7	6
(France) Calvin Hemery	7^{7}	5	3
(Germany) Maximilian Marterer	6	7^{7}
(Lithuania) Edas Butvilas	3	6^{5}
(France) Arthur Bouquier	5	6	3
30	(Argentina) Federico Coria	7	3	6

Second round
(Italy) Federico Arnaboldi	w/o
PR	(United States) Michael Mmoh
(Germany) Maximilian Marterer	5
30	(Argentina) Federico Coria	1^{r}

Qualifying competition
(Italy) Federico Arnaboldi	4	1
(Germany) Maximilian Marterer	6	6

=== Fifth qualifier ===
First round
5	(United States) Brandon Holt	1	4
(Japan) James Trotter	6	6
PR	(Australia) Jason Kubler	6	3	6
(Spain) Alejandro Moro Cañas	4	6	2
PR	(Netherlands) Tim van Rijthoven	6^{4}	0
WC	(France) Sascha Gueymard Wayenburg	7^{7}	6
(Lebanon) Benjamin Hassan	7^{7}	7
26	Pavel Kotov	6^{3}	5

Second round
(Japan) James Trotter	7^{8}	3	6
PR	(Australia) Jason Kubler	6^{6}	6	3
WC	(France) Sascha Gueymard Wayenburg	4	4
(Lebanon) Benjamin Hassan	6	6

Qualifying competition
(Japan) James Trotter	2	6^{5}
(Lebanon) Benjamin Hassan	6	7^{7}

=== Sixth qualifier ===
First round
6	(United Kingdom) Billy Harris	5	3
(United Kingdom) Dan Evans	7	6
WC	(France) Clément Tabur	3	6	7
(Australia) Li Tu	6	3	5
(Romania) Filip Cristian Jianu	2	7^{7}	6
(Slovakia) Jozef Kovalík	6	6^{4}	4
(Germany) Henri Squire	3	6	6
17	(Brazil) Felipe Meligeni Alves	6	1	4

Second round
(United Kingdom) Dan Evans	1	3
WC	(France) Clément Tabur	6	6
(Romania) Filip Cristian Jianu	6	6
(Germany) Henri Squire	4	2

Qualifying competition
WC	(France) Clément Tabur	6	7
(Romania) Filip Cristian Jianu	4	5

=== Seventh qualifier ===
First round
7	(Italy) Fabio Fognini	3	2
(United States) Nicolas Moreno de Alboran	6	6
(Netherlands) Guy den Ouden	6^{3}	6	4
(Slovakia) Lukáš Klein	7^{7}	3	6
(Luxembourg) Chris Rodesch	6^{5}	4
(France) Ugo Blanchet	7^{7}	6
(Chile) Cristian Garín	6	6
32	(France) Harold Mayot	3	4

Second round
(United States) Nicolas Moreno de Alboran	3	7^{7}	4
(Slovakia) Lukáš Klein	6	6^{3}	6
(France) Ugo Blanchet	7^{7}	7^{7}
(Chile) Cristian Garín	6^{5}	6^{5}

Qualifying competition
(Slovakia) Lukáš Klein	4	5
(France) Ugo Blanchet	6	7

=== Eighth qualifier ===
First round
8	(Croatia) Marin Čilić	6	6
PR	(China) Wu Yibing	2	3
(Spain) Pol Martín Tiffon	2	6	6
WC	(France) Moïse Kouamé	6	4	3
(South Africa) Lloyd Harris	6	6
(Switzerland) Marc-Andrea Hüsler	4	2
(France) Antoine Escoffier	6^{3}	3
23	(Finland) Otto Virtanen	7^{7}	6

Second round
8	(Croatia) Marin Čilić	6	6
(Spain) Pol Martín Tiffon	4	3
(South Africa) Lloyd Harris	6	7
23	(Finland) Otto Virtanen	4	5

Qualifying competition
8	(Croatia) Marin Čilić	3	6	3
(South Africa) Lloyd Harris	6	4	6

=== Ninth qualifier ===
First round
9	(United States) Christopher Eubanks	6^{4}	3
(Austria) Jurij Rodionov	7^{7}	6
(United States) Mitchell Krueger	1	1
(India) Sumit Nagal	6	6
(United States) Colton Smith	4	6	2
PR	(Italy) Stefano Napolitano	6	4	6
(France) Kyrian Jacquet	6	6
27	(Japan) Taro Daniel	1	4

Second round
(Austria) Jurij Rodionov	6	6
(India) Sumit Nagal	2	4
PR	(Italy) Stefano Napolitano	3	6	0
(France) Kyrian Jacquet	6	2	6

Qualifying competition
(Austria) Jurij Rodionov	2	2
(France) Kyrian Jacquet	6	6

=== Tenth qualifier ===
First round
10	(Denmark) Elmer Møller	6	7
PR	(Argentina) Facundo Bagnis	4	5
(Japan) Yuta Shimizu	3	1
PR	(Belgium) Kimmer Coppejans	6	6
(Kazakhstan) Beibit Zhukayev	5	3
(United States) Zachary Svajda	7	6
(Italy) Matteo Gigante	6	3	6
21	(Switzerland) Jérôme Kym	3	6	3

Second round
10	(Denmark) Elmer Møller	4	6	6
PR	(Belgium) Kimmer Coppejans	6	1	2
(United States) Zachary Svajda	4	4
(Italy) Matteo Gigante	6	6

Qualifying competition
10	(Denmark) Elmer Møller	3	6^{5}
(Italy) Matteo Gigante	6	7^{7}

=== Eleventh qualifier ===
First round
11	(United States) Ethan Quinn	7	7
(Estonia) Mark Lajal	5	5
(Hong Kong) Coleman Wong	6^{2}	3
(Australia) Bernard Tomic	7^{7}	6
(United States) Murphy Cassone	2	3
(Denmark) August Holmgren	6	6
(Argentina) Juan Pablo Ficovich	2	2
24	(Argentina) Thiago Agustín Tirante	6	6

Second round
11	(United States) Ethan Quinn	6	6
(Australia) Bernard Tomic	3	4
(Denmark) August Holmgren	3	4
24	(Argentina) Thiago Agustín Tirante	6	6

Qualifying competition
11	(United States) Ethan Quinn	6	4	7^{10}
24	(Argentina) Thiago Agustín Tirante	3	6	6^{5}

=== Twelfth qualifier ===
First round
12	(Argentina) Juan Manuel Cerúndolo	7^{7}	6
(Belgium) Gauthier Onclin	6^{4}	4
(Lebanon) Hady Habib	6^{1}	7^{7}	6
(Argentina) Facundo Mena	7^{7}	6^{5}	1
(Tunisia) Aziz Dougaz	6^{4}	6	6^{7}
(Kazakhstan) Dmitry Popko	7^{7}	3	7^{10}
(Australia) Omar Jasika	3	6	1
18	(Colombia) Daniel Elahi Galán	6	4	6

Second round
12	(Argentina) Juan Manuel Cerúndolo	6	6^{4}	6
(Lebanon) Hady Habib	4	7^{7}	3
(Kazakhstan) Dmitry Popko	1	2
18	(Colombia) Daniel Elahi Galán	6	6

Qualifying competition
12	(Argentina) Juan Manuel Cerúndolo	6	6
18	(Colombia) Daniel Elahi Galán	4	2

=== Thirteenth qualifier ===
First round
13	(Chile) Tomás Barrios Vera	6	6
(France) Luka Pavlovic	4	3
WC	(France) Robin Bertrand	6^{5}	2
(Portugal) Henrique Rocha	7^{7}	6
Alibek Kachmazov	3	4
(Kazakhstan) Timofey Skatov	6	6
(France) Luca Van Assche	6	7
20	(France) Adrian Mannarino	3	5

Second round
13	(Chile) Tomás Barrios Vera	6^{1}	3
(Portugal) Henrique Rocha	7^{7}	6
(Kazakhstan) Timofey Skatov	7^{7}	2	2
(France) Luca Van Assche	6^{3}	6	6

Qualifying competition
(Portugal) Henrique Rocha	6	6^{1}	7
(France) Luca Van Assche	3	7^{7}	5

=== Fourteenth qualifier ===
First round
14	(Brazil) Thiago Seyboth Wild	6	6
(Japan) Yasutaka Uchiyama	3	3
WC	(France) Geoffrey Blancaneaux	6	6
(Kazakhstan) Mikhail Kukushkin	1	1
(Georgia (country)) Nikoloz Basilashvili	6	6
(Netherlands) Gijs Brouwer	3	2
(Monaco) Valentin Vacherot	6	6
28	(Spain) Carlos Taberner	2	4

Second round
14	(Brazil) Thiago Seyboth Wild	3	3
WC	(France) Geoffrey Blancaneaux	6	6
(Georgia (country)) Nikoloz Basilashvili	7^{7}	6
(Monaco) Valentin Vacherot	6^{3}	3

Qualifying competition
WC	(France) Geoffrey Blancaneaux	2	4
(Georgia (country)) Nikoloz Basilashvili	6	6

=== Fifteenth qualifier ===
First round
15	(United States) Eliot Spizzirri	7^{8}	4	7^{10}
(France) Hugo Grenier	6^{6}	6	6^{6}
PR	(Italy) Giulio Zeppieri	6	7^{7}
(United Kingdom) Jan Choinski	4	6^{5}
(Spain) Martín Landaluce	6	3	7^{10}
(Bolivia) Murkel Dellien	4	6	6^{8}
WC	(France) Maé Malige	3	3
29	(Argentina) Federico Agustín Gómez	6	6

Second round
15	(United States) Eliot Spizzirri	2	3
PR	(Italy) Giulio Zeppieri	6	6
(Spain) Martín Landaluce	0	7^{7}	3
29	(Argentina) Federico Agustín Gómez	6	6^{5}	6

Qualifying competition
PR	(Italy) Giulio Zeppieri	6	6
29	(Argentina) Federico Agustín Gómez	1	4

=== Sixteenth qualifier ===
First round
16	(United States) Tristan Boyer	7^{7}	6
(Spain) Daniel Rincón	6^{5}	4
(Lithuania) Vilius Gaubas	6^{4}	6	6
(Croatia) Duje Ajduković	7^{7}	4	4
PR	(Spain) Pablo Llamas Ruiz	4	6	7
(Australia) Alex Bolt	6	4	5
(France) Grégoire Barrère	2	4
22	(Czech Republic) Dalibor Svrčina	6	6

Second round
16	(United States) Tristan Boyer	5	3
(Lithuania) Vilius Gaubas	7	6
PR	(Spain) Pablo Llamas Ruiz	6	6
22	(Czech Republic) Dalibor Svrčina	1	0

Qualifying competition
(Lithuania) Vilius Gaubas	0	6	2
PR	(Spain) Pablo Llamas Ruiz	6	3	6
