= San Marcos Open Aguascalientes =

- 2022 San Marcos Open Aguascalientes

ATP Challenger Tour
- Event name: San Marcos Open Aguascalientes
- Location: Aguascalientes, Mexico
- Venue: AC Club Campestre de Aguascalientes
- Category: ATP Challenger Tour
- Surface: Clay
- Website: Website

The San Marcos Open Aguascalientes is a professional tennis tournament played on clay courts. It is currently part of the Association of Tennis Professionals (ATP) Challenger Tour. It is held in Aguascalientes, Mexico since 2022.

== Past finals ==
=== Singles ===
Year	Champion	Runner-up	Score
2022	(Switzerland) Marc-Andrea Hüsler	(Argentina) Juan Pablo Ficovich	6–4, 4–6, 6–3

=== Doubles ===
Year	Champions	Runners-up	Score
2022	(Colombia) Nicolás Barrientos (Mexico) Miguel Ángel Reyes-Varela	(Portugal) Gonçalo Oliveira (India) Divij Sharan	7–5, 6–3
