= 2025 Campeonato Internacional de Tênis de Campinas =

- Date: 31 March – 6 April
- Edition: 14th
- Surface: Clay
- Location: Campinas, Brazil

Champions

Singles
- (Chile) Tomás Barrios Vera

Doubles
- (Argentina) Mariano Kestelboim / (Argentina) Gonzalo Villanueva
← 2024 ·	Campeonato Internacional de Tênis de Campinas	· 2026 →

The 2025 Campeonato Internacional de Tênis was a professional tennis tournament played on clay courts. It was the 14th edition of the tournament which was part of the 2025 ATP Challenger Tour. It took place in Campinas, Brazil between 31 March and 6 April 2025.

== Singles main-draw entrants ==
=== Seeds ===
Country	Player	Rank^{1}	Seed
CHI	Tomás Barrios Vera	149	1
ARG	Facundo Mena	186	2
ARG	Andrea Collarini	198	3
PER	Juan Pablo Varillas	236	4
FRA	Enzo Couacaud	239	5
CHI	Matías Soto	244	6
ECU	Álvaro Guillén Meza	257	7
PER	Gonzalo Bueno	264	8

- ^{1} Rankings as of 17 March 2025.

=== Other entrants ===
The following players received wildcards into the singles main draw:

- (Brazil) Gustavo Albieri
- (Brazil) Gustavo Ribeiro de Almeida
- (Brazil) Eduardo Ribeiro

The following players received entry into the singles main draw as alternates:

- (Argentina) Mariano Kestelboim
- (Brazil) José Pereira

The following players received entry from the qualifying draw:

- (Brazil) Enzo Camargo Lima
- (Peru) Conner Huertas del Pino
- (Thailand) Maximus Jones
- (Japan) Yuki Mochizuki
- (Argentina) Ignacio Monzón
- (Chile) Daniel Antonio Núñez

== Champions ==
=== Singles ===
- (Chile) Tomás Barrios Vera def. (Ecuador) Álvaro Guillén Meza 6–4, 6–3.

=== Doubles ===
- (Argentina) Mariano Kestelboim / (Argentina) Gonzalo Villanueva def. (Japan) Seita Watanabe / (Japan) Takeru Yuzuki 6–2, 7–6^{(7–5)}.
