= Yucatán Open =

- 2025 Yucatán Open

ATP Challenger Tour
- Event name: Yucatán Open
- Location: Mérida, Mexico
- Venue: Club Campestre
- Category: ATP Challenger Tour
- Surface: Clay
- Prize money: $100,000 (2025)

The Yucatán Open is a professional tennis tournament played on clay courts. It is currently part of the ATP Challenger Tour. It was first held in Mérida, Mexico in 2024. It was cancelled on the 2026 Challenger calendar.

== Past finals ==
=== Singles ===
Year	Champion	Runner-up	Score
2026	Cancelled		
2025	(Brazil) Felipe Meligeni Alves	(Argentina) Juan Pablo Ficovich	6–2, 1–6, 6–2
2024	(United States) Tristan Boyer	(Argentina) Juan Pablo Ficovich	7–6^{(8–6)}, 6–2

=== Doubles ===
Year	Champions	Runners-up	Score
2025	(Switzerland) Kilian Feldbausch (Mexico) Rodrigo Pacheco Méndez	(United States) George Goldhoff (United States) Trey Hilderbrand	6–4, 6–2
2024	(Australia) Thomas Fancutt (United States) Hunter Reese	(United States) Boris Kozlov (United States) Stefan Kozlov	7–5, 6–3
