= Tristan Boyer =

American tennis player (born 2001)

- Boyer at 2026 Wimbledon Championships
- Country (sports): United States
- Born: April 21, 2001 (age 25) Altadena, California, U.S.
- Height: 6 ft 2 in (1.88 m)
- Turned pro: 2023
- Plays: Right-handed (two-handed backhand)
- College: Stanford
- Coach: Horacio Matta, Denis Kudla
- Prize money: US $1,202,065

Singles
- Career record: 6–11
- Career titles: 0
- Highest ranking: No. 106 (September 8, 2025)
- Current ranking: No. 200 (November 16, 2026)

Grand Slam singles results
- Australian Open: 2R (2025)
- French Open: Q2 (2025)
- Wimbledon: 1R (2026)
- US Open: 2R (2025)

Doubles
- Career record: 2–4
- Career titles: 0
- Highest ranking: No. 198 (September 23, 2024)

Grand Slam doubles results
- US Open: 3R (2024)
- Last updated on: November 17, 2026.

Tristan Boyer (born April 21, 2001) is an American tennis player. He has a career-high ATP singles ranking of world No. 106 achieved on September 8, 2025. He also has a doubles ranking of No. 198 achieved on September 23, 2024.

== College career ==
Boyer played college tennis at Stanford. Tristan won the PAC-12 team championship in 2021 as freshman and was the only Stanford player in 2021 Pac-12 tournament to go undefeated. Two-time ITA Scholar Athlete Award winner. In the spring 2022, Boyer was ranked #9 of all college players, and ranked #4 American college players on UTR. Went 9-6 in singles play as Freshman (Played at 1, 2, 3 and 4 spots at singles, played 1, 2, 3 spots at doubles) and 7-4 doubles. Boyer was also a two-time PAC-12 Honor Roll recipient. He left Stanford in March 2022 to pursue professional tennis full-time under the Pac-12 Athlete Graduation Benefits Program. Boyer was rated the number-1 recruit in the country for 3 years in a row on Tennis Recruiting.

== Professional career ==
=== 2023-2024: Turned Pro, maiden challenger title, top 150 ===
In 11 months since beginning his full-time professional career in February 2023, Boyer went from top 1500 in the ATP rankings to the top 200. He won one ATP Challenger title, had two ATP Challenger finalist appearances, two semifinalist appearances, and two quarterfinalist appearances. Ranked No. 230 and seeded third, Boyer won his maiden ATP Challenger singles title at the inaugural 2024 Yucatán Open and reached the top 200 at world No. 193 on 1 April 2024, moving close to 40 positions up in the ATP rankings. After his maiden ATP Challenger Tour title in March 2024, Boyer had five ATP Challenger quarterfinalist appearances, one semifinal and one singles final.

In August 2024, after receiving a US Open doubles wildcard, Boyer teamed with partner, Emilio Nava, who also played juniors in Southern California, to reach the third round, defeating the ninth seeded team Santiago Gonzalez/Edouard Roger-Vasselin along the way.

He won his second singles Challenger title at the 2024 Campeonato Internacional de Tênis de Campinas in Brazil and reached a new career-high of No. 159 on 21 October 2024. On November 17 Boyer won his third Challenger singles title in Montevideo, Uruguay, defeating Hugo Dellien in straight sets. Boyer did not drop a set the entire tournament, and with the win tied the 20-year-old record for the most wins by an American on the ATP Challenger Tour in a single year at 44 wins (since Kevin Kim in 2004), and the record for the most clay-court ATP Challenger titles by an American held by Francis Tiafoe. As a result, he moved to a new career high of world No. 130 in the ATP rankings ending his season on 18 November 2024.

=== 2025: Major and Masters debuts and first wins ===
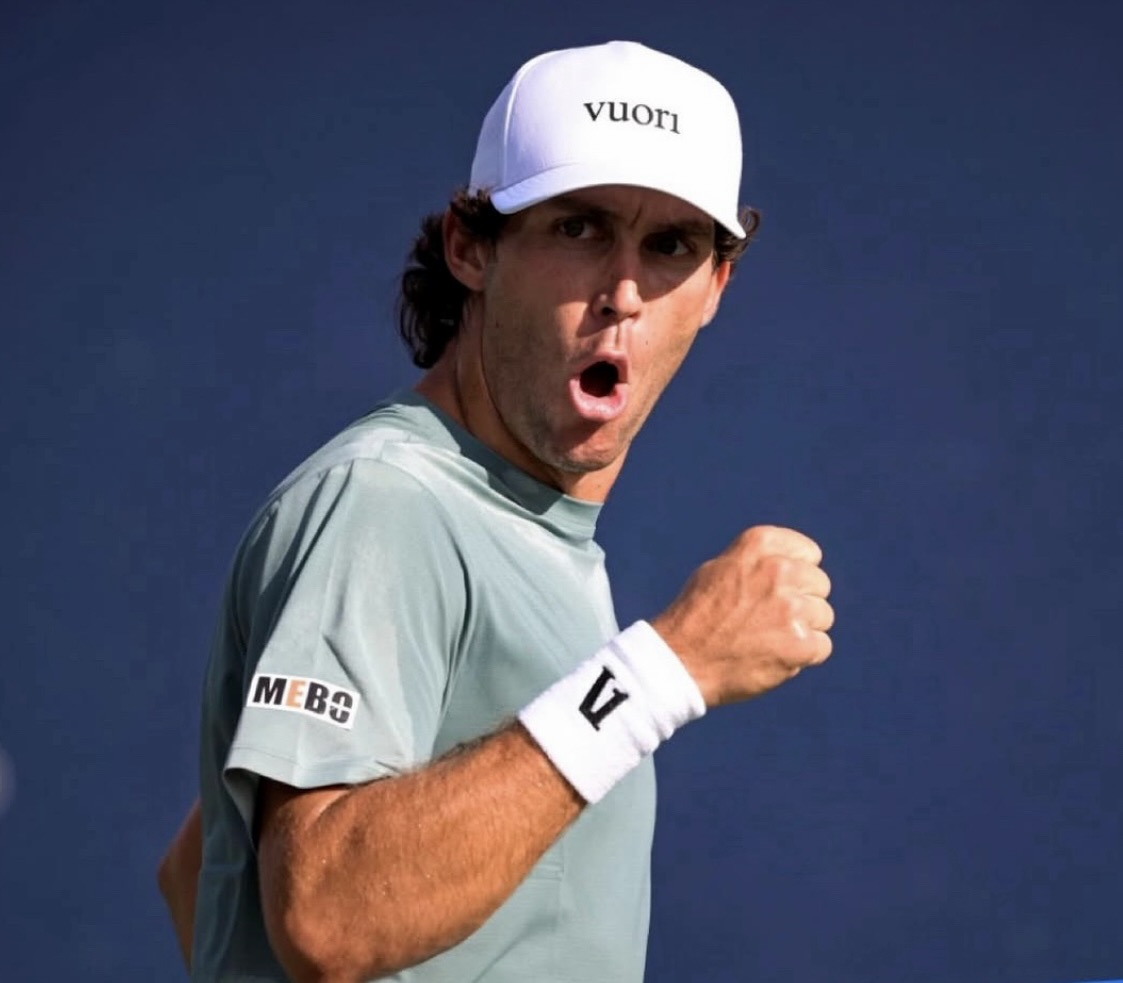
Boyer at 2025 US Open

Boyer made his Grand Slam tournament debut at the Australian Open after qualifying into the main draw. He defeated Federico Coria in five sets in the first round, before losing his next match to eighth seed Alex de Minaur.

Boyer qualified at the 2025 Indian Wells Open making his Masters 1000 main draw debut and defeated Aleksandar Vukic in the first round to record his first ATP 1000 Masters win.

At the 2025 National Bank Open he reached the second round after qualifying for the main draw, defeating Aleksandar Kovacevic, but lost to 12th seed Jakub Menšík. At the 2025 Cincinnati Open Boyer again reached the main draw second round of a third ATP 1000 in his career and for the season after beating fellow American, Brandon Holt in straight sets before losing in three sets to Jiří Lehečka.

After receiving a main draw wildcard to the 2025 US Open, Boyer defeated James Duckworth in the first round before losing to 15th seed Andrey Rublev in four sets, reaching his second main draw Grand Slam second round appearance for the season.

== Performance timeline ==
Key
W	F	SF	QF	#R	RR	Q#	DNQ	A	NH

(W) winner; (F) finalist; (SF) semifinalist; (QF) quarterfinalist; (#R) rounds 4, 3, 2, 1; (RR) round-robin stage; (Q#) qualification round; (DNQ) did not qualify; (A) absent; (NH) not held; (SR) strike rate (events won / competed); (W–L) win–loss record.
To avoid confusion and double counting, these charts are updated at the conclusion of a tournament or when the player's participation has ended.

=== Singles ===
Tournament	2018	2019	2020	2021	2022	2023	2024	2025	2026	SR	W–L	Win %
Grand Slam tournaments
Australian Open	A	A	A	A	A	A	A	2R	Q3	0 / 1	1–1	50%
French Open	A	A	A	A	A	A	Q1	Q2	A	0 / 0	0–0	–
Wimbledon	A	A	NH	A	A	A	Q1	Q1		0 / 0	0–0	–
US Open	A	A	A	A	A	Q1	Q1	2R		0 / 1	1–1	50%
Win–loss	0–0	0–0	0–0	0–0	0–0	0–0	0–0	2–2		0 / 2	2–2	50%
ATP Masters 1000
Indian Wells Masters	Q1	A	NH	A	A	A	A	2R		0 / 1	1–1	50%
Miami Open	A	A	NH	A	A	A	A	Q2		0 / 0	0–0	–
Monte Carlo Masters	A	A	NH	A	A	A	A	A		0 / 0	0–0	–
Madrid Open	A	A	NH	A	A	A	A	Q2		0 / 0	0-0	–
Italian Open	A	A	A	A	A	A	A	Q1		0 / 0	0–0	–
Canadian Open	A	A	NH	A	A	A	A	2R		0 / 1	1–1	50%
Cincinnati Masters	A	A	A	A	A	A	A	2R		0 / 1	1–1	50%
Shanghai Masters	A	A	NH			A	A	Q1		0 / 0	0–0	–
Paris Masters	A	A	A	A	A	A	A	A		0 / 0	0–0	–
Win–loss	0–0	0–0	0–0	0–0	0–0	0–0	0–0	3–3		0 / 3	3–3	50%

== ATP Challenger and ITF World Tennis Tour finals ==
=== Singles: 8 (4 titles, 4 runner-ups) ===
Legend ATP Challenger Tour (4–3) ITF WTT (0–1)	Finals by surface Hard (0–2) Clay (4–2) Grass (0–0) Carpet (0–0)

Result	W–L	Date	Tournament	Tier	Surface	Opponent	Score
Loss	0–1	Apr 2023	Savannah Challenger, US	Challenger	Clay	(Argentina) Facundo Díaz Acosta	3–6, 1–6
Loss	0–2	Sep 2023	Antofagasta Challenger, Chile	Challenger	Clay	(Argentina) Camilo Ugo Carabelli	6–3, 1–6, 5–7
Win	1–2	Mar 2024	Yucatán Open, Mexico	Challenger	Clay	(Argentina) Juan Pablo Ficovich	7–6^{(8–6)}, 6–2
Loss	1–3	Sep 2024	Las Vegas Challenger, US	Challenger	Hard	(United States) Learner Tien	5–7, 6–1, 3–6
Win	2–3	Oct 2024	Campeonato Internacional de Tênis de Campinas, Brazil	Challenger	Clay	(Argentina) Juan Pablo Ficovich	6–2, 3–6, 6–3
Win	3–3	Nov 2024	Uruguay Open, Uruguay	Challenger	Clay	(Bolivia) Hugo Dellien	6–2, 6–4
Win	4–3	May 2026	Tunis Open, Tunisia	Challenger	Clay	(United States) Dali Blanch	6–1, 6–0

Result	W–L	Date	Tournament	Tier	Surface	Opponent	Score
Loss	0–1	Oct 2021	M25 Calabasas, US	WTT	Hard	(Australia) Rinky Hijikata	6–3, 5–7, 2–6

=== Doubles: 3 (1 title, 2 runner-ups) ===
Legend ATP Challenger Tour (1–1) ITF WTT (0–1)	Finals by surface Hard (0–1) Clay (1–1) Grass (0–0) Carpet (0–0)

Result	W–L	Date	Tournament	Tier	Surface	Partner	Opponents	Score
Win	1–0	Apr 2024	Sarasota Open, US	Challenger	Clay	(United Kingdom) Oliver Crawford	(United States) Ethan Quinn (United States) Tennys Sandgren	6–4, 6–2
Loss	1–1	Sep 2024	Las Vegas Challenger, US	Challenger	Hard	(United States) Tennyson Whiting	(United States) Trey Hilderbrand (United States) Alex Lawson	7–6^{(11–9)}, 5–7, [8–10]

Result	W–L	Date	Tournament	Tier	Surface	Partner	Opponents	Score
Loss	0–1	Mar 2020	M15 Antalya, Turkey	WTT	Clay	(United States) Martin Damm	(Germany) Peter Heller (Germany) Peter Torebko	5–7, 2–6
