= Trey Hilderbrand =

American tennis player (born 2000)

- Country (sports): United States
- Born: 15 May 2000 (age 26) San Antonio, Texas, US
- Height: 1.96 m (6 ft 5 in)
- Plays: Right-handed (two-handed backhand)
- College: UCF; Texas A&M
- Coach: Mark Hilderbrand
- Prize money: US $150,518

Singles
- Career record: 0–0
- Career titles: 0
- Highest ranking: No. 620 (March 3, 2025)
- Current ranking: No. 1,228 (July 27, 2026)

Doubles
- Career record: 0–0
- Career titles: 0; 8 Challengers
- Highest ranking: No. 88 (July 27, 2026)
- Current ranking: No. 88 (July 27, 2026)

Grand Slam doubles results
- French Open: 1R (2026)
- US Open: 1R (2025)
- Last updated on: July 27, 2026.

Trey Hilderbrand (born May 15, 2000) is an American tennis player. Hilderbrand has a career high ATP singles ranking of No. 620 achieved on March 3, 2025 and a career high ATP doubles ranking of No. 88 achieved on July 27, 2026.

Hilderbrand has won 8 ATP Challenger doubles titles.

Hilderbrand played college tennis at UCF before transferring to Texas A&M.

== ATP Challenger Tour finals ==
=== Doubles: 16 (9 titles, 7 runner-up) ===
Legend ATP Challenger Tour (9–7)

Result	W–L	Date	Tournament	Tier	Surface	Partner	Opponents	Score
Loss	0–1	May 2024	Santos, Brazil	Challenger	Clay	(Lebanon) Hady Habib	(Israel) Roy Stepanov (Colombia) Andrés Urrea	walkover
Win	1–1	Jun 2024	Santa Fe, Argentina	Challenger	Clay	(Lebanon) Hady Habib	(Uruguay) Ignacio Carou (Argentina) Facundo Mena	6–7^{(5–7)}, 6–2, [10–4]
Win	2–1	Jun 2024	Lima, Peru	Challenger	Clay	(Lebanon) Hady Habib	(Brazil) Pedro Boscardin Dias (Brazil) Pedro Sakamoto	7–5, 6–3
Win	3–1	Jun 2024	Santa Cruz de la Sierra, Bolivia	Challenger	Clay	(Lebanon) Hady Habib	(New Zealand) Finn Reynolds (Chile) Matías Soto	3–6, 6–3, [10–7]
Win	4–1	Sep 2024	Las Vegas, USA	Challenger	Hard	(United States) Alex Lawson	(United States) Tennyson Whiting (United States) Tristan Boyer	6–7^{(9–11)}, 7–5, [10–8]
Win	5–1	Jan 2025	Oeiras, Portugal	Challenger	Hard (i)	(United States) George Goldhoff	(Japan) Kaichi Uchida (Kazakhstan) Denis Yevseyev	7–5, 2–6, [10–5]
Loss	5–2	Mar 2025	Mérida, Mexico	Challenger	Clay	(United States) George Goldhoff	(Switzerland) Kilian Feldbausch (Mexico) Rodrigo Pacheco Méndez	4–6, 2–6
Loss	5–3	Apr 2025	San Luis Potosí, Mexico	Challenger	Clay	(United States) Alfredo Perez	Ivan Liutarevich (United Kingdom) Marcus Willis	3–6, 4–6
Loss	5–4	June 2025	Cary, United States	Challenger	Hard	(Australia) Patrick Harper	(Australia) Finn Reynolds (Australia) James Watt	3–6, 7–6^{(2–7)}, [5–10]
Win	6–4	Sep 2025	Saint-Tropez, France	Challenger	Hard	(United States) Mac Kiger	(Finland) Patrik Niklas-Salminen (Czech Republic) Matěj Vocel	7–6^{(7–5)}, 7–5
Win	7–4	Nov 2025	Drummondville, Canada	Challenger	Hard (i)	(United States) Mac Kiger	(Mexico) Alan Magadán (United States) Karl Poling	6–3, 6–4
Win	8–4	Jan 2026	San Diego, United States	Challenger	Hard	(United States) Mac Kiger	(United States) Garrett Johns (United States) Karl Poling	6–3, 6–4
Loss	8–5	Mar 2026	Punta Cana, Dominican Republic	Challenger	Hard	(Israel) Daniel Cukierman	(Monaco) Romain Arneodo (Brazil) Marcelo Demoliner	6–7^{(2–7)}, 6–3, [6–10]
Loss	8–6	Apr 2026	Madrid, Spain	Challenger	Clay	(United States) George Goldhoff	(Czech Republic) Andrew Paulson (Czech Republic) Michael Vrbenský	6–2, 4–6, [8–10]
Loss	8–7	Jun 2026	Ilkley, United Kingdom	Challenger	Grass	(India) Rithvik Choudary Bollipalli	(United Kingdom) David Stevenson (United Kingdom) Marcus Willis	6–7^{(5–7)}, 3–6
Win	9–7	Jul 2026	Bloomfield Hills, United States	Challenger	Hard	(United States) JJ Tracy	(Thailand) Pruchya Isaro (India) Niki Kaliyanda Poonacha	6–3, 7–6^{(7–2)}

== ITF World Tennis Tour finals ==
=== Doubles: 1 (1 runner-up) ===
Legend ITF WTT (0–1)

Result	W–L	Date	Tournament	Tier	Surface	Partner	Opponents	Score
Loss	0–1	Mar 2024	M25 Santo Domingo, Dominican Republic	WTT	Hard	(United States) Pranav Kumar	(Colombia) Andrés Urrea (Colombia) Nicolás Mejía	7–6^{(7–5)},4-6, [5–10]
