= Rodrigo Pacheco Méndez =

Mexican tennis player (born 2005)

Rodrigo Pacheco
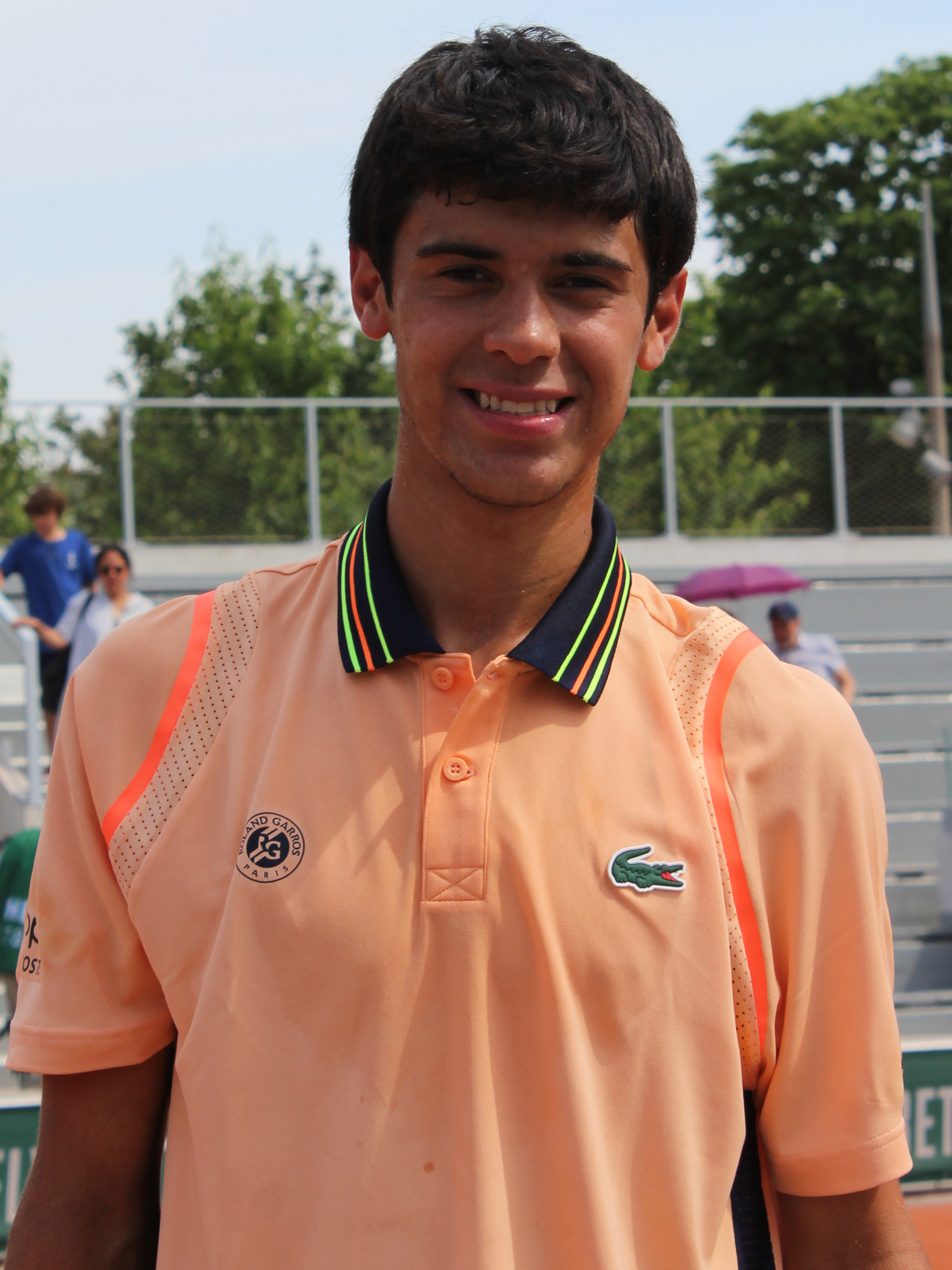
- Pacheco Méndez at the 2023 French Open
- Full name: Rodrigo Pacheco Méndez
- Country (sports): Mexico
- Born: 25 April 2005 (age 21) Mérida, Yucatán
- Height: 1.91 m (6 ft 3 in)
- Turned pro: 2022
- Plays: Left-handed (two-handed backhand)
- Coach: Alain Lemaitre
- Prize money: US$ 438,433

Singles
- Career record: 7–11 (at ATP Tour level, Grand Slam level, and in Davis Cup)
- Career titles: 0
- Highest ranking: No. 196 (22 September 2025)
- Current ranking: No. 260 (9 November 2026)

Grand Slam singles results
- Australian Open: Q1 (2026)
- French Open: Q1 (2025)
- US Open: Q2 (2025)

Doubles
- Career record: 2–7 (at ATP Tour level, Grand Slam level, and in Davis Cup)
- Career titles: 0; 3 Challenger
- Highest ranking: No. 132 (2 March 2026)
- Current ranking: No. 142 (9 November 2026)
- Last updated on: 9 November 2026.

Rodrigo Pacheco Méndez (born 25 April 2005) is a Mexican professional tennis player. He has a career-high ATP singles ranking of world No. 196 achieved on 22 September 2025 and a doubles ranking of No. 132 achieved on 2 March 2026. He is currently the No. 1 singles player from Mexico.

Pacheco Méndez reached an ITF junior combined ranking of No. 1 on 29 May 2023.

== Career ==
=== 2022: Turned Pro, ATP debut ===
Pacheco reached the quarterfinals of the Junior Australian Open and the Junior French Open in 2022.

Pacheco made his ATP debut at the 2022 Los Cabos Open in the main singles draw.

=== 2023: Juniors: French Open doubles champion, world No. 1 ===
Pacheco Méndez received a wildcard for the main draw of the 2023 Abierto Mexicano Telcel in Acapulco. He also received a wildcard for the inaugural 2023 edition of the Challenger in Mexico City. He reached a career high junior ranking of No. 1 on 29 May 2023. Rodrigo Pacheco won the Junior 2023 French Open in doubles.

=== 2024-2025: First ATP quarterfinal, Top 200 debut ===
For a third consecutive year, he received a wildcard for the main draw of the 2024 Los Cabos Open where he lost in the first round to the No. 72 ranked Australian Aleksandar Vukic in straight sets with two tiebreaks. He again received a wildcard for the main draw of the 2024 Abierto Mexicano Telcel but lost to the No. 55 ranked Serbian Dušan Lajović.

On 22 April 2024, he reached the top 600 at world No. 589, following a quarterfinal showing at the 2024 GNP Seguros Tennis Open Challenger in Acapulco with wins over second seed Michael Mmoh and Nicolás Mejía.

In May, ranked No. 585, he won the biggest title of his career defeating Bernard Tomic in the final of the M25 Xalapa in Mexico. He reached the top 500 on 20 May 2024, climbing more than 120 positions up in the rankings, following another final showing as a wildcard, at the M15 Villahermosa also in Mexico.

Ranked No. 356, Pacheco received a main draw wildcard for the ATP 500 2025 Abierto Mexicano Telcel, where he defeated world No. 66 Aleksandar Vukic recording the biggest win of his career. He became the youngest Mexican man to win an ATP Tour match since 1996 (Alejandro Hernandez in Santiago). Next Pacheco Mendez reached his first ATP Tour quarterfinal and first at the 500-level after getting a walkover from second seed Casper Ruud and moved 124 positions up in the rankings into the top 250 on 3 March 2025. Pacheco Mendez became the first Mexican tour-level quarterfinalist since 1998, when Alejandro Hernandez reached the last eight on Mexico City's clay courts.

== Performance timeline ==
Key
W	F	SF	QF	#R	RR	Q#	DNQ	A	NH

(W) winner; (F) finalist; (SF) semifinalist; (QF) quarterfinalist; (#R) rounds 4, 3, 2, 1; (RR) round-robin stage; (Q#) qualification round; (DNQ) did not qualify; (A) absent; (NH) not held; (SR) strike rate (events won / competed); (W–L) win–loss record.
To avoid confusion and double counting, these charts are updated at the conclusion of a tournament or when the player's participation has ended.

=== Singles ===
Tournament	2025	2026	SR	W–L	Win %
Grand Slam tournaments
Australian Open	A	Q1	0 / 0	0–0	–
French Open	Q1	A	0 / 0	0–0	–
Wimbledon	A	A	0 / 0	0–0	–
US Open	Q2		0 / 0	0–0	–
Win–loss	0–0	0–0	0 / 0	0–0	–
ATP 1000 tournaments
Indian Wells Open	A	A	0 / 0	0–0	–
Miami Open	A	A	0 / 0	0–0	–
Monte-Carlo Masters	A	A	0 / 0	0–0	–
Madrid Open	A	A	0 / 0	0-0	–
Italian Open	A	A	0 / 0	0–0	–
Canadian Open	A		0 / 0	0–0	–
Cincinnati Open	A		0 / 0	0–0	–
Shanghai Masters	A		0 / 0	0–0	–
Paris Masters	A		0 / 0	0–0	–
Win–loss	0–0	0–0	0 / 0	0–0	–

== ATP Challenger Tour finals ==
=== Singles: 1 (1 runner-up) ===
Legend ATP Challenger Tour (0–1)	Finals by surface Hard (0–1)

Result	W–L	Date	Tournament	Tier	Surface	Opponent	Score
Loss	0–1	Sep 2026	Phan Thiết Challenger IV, Vietnam	Challenger	Hard	Ilia Simakin	7–6^{(7–4)}, 4–6, 3–6

=== Doubles: 6 (3 titles, 3 runner-ups) ===
Legend ATP Challenger Tour (3–3)

Result	W–L	Date	Tournament	Tier	Surface	Partner	Opponents	Score
Win	1–0	Mar 2025	Yucatán Open, Mexico	Challenger	Clay	(Switzerland) Kilian Feldbausch	(United States) George Goldhoff (United States) Trey Hilderbrand	6–4, 6–2
Win	2–0	Nov 2025	Uruguay Open, Uruguay	Challenger	Clay	(Argentina) Facundo Mena	(Ecuador) Gonzalo Escobar (Mexico) Miguel Ángel Reyes-Varela	3–6, 6–3, [11–9]
Win	3–0	Nov 2025	Challenger de Guayaquil, Ecuador	Challenger	Clay	(Mexico) Alex Hernández	(Argentina) Lucio Ratti (Brazil) Victor Hugo Remondy Pagotto	7–5, 6–3
Loss	3–1	Jan 2026	Soma Bay Open, Egypt	Challenger	Hard	(Mexico) Alex Hernández	(Sweden) Erik Grevelius (Sweden) Adam Heinonen	2–6, 3–6
Loss	3–2	Mar 2026	Banorte Tennis Open, Mexico	Challenger	Clay	(Argentina) Facundo Mena	(Australia) Jake Delaney (Australia) Tristan Schoolkate	4–6, 6–7^{(2–7)}
Loss	3–3	Oct 2026	Cali Open, Colombia	Challenger	Clay	(Mexico) Alan Magadán	(Bolivia) Federico Zeballos (Brazil) Marcelo Zormann	5–5 retired

== ITF World Tennis Tour finals ==
=== Singles: 6 (3 titles, 3 runner-ups) ===
Legend ITF WTT (3–3)	Finals by surface Hard (3–3) Clay (0–0)

Result	W–L	Date	Tournament	Tier	Surface	Opponent	Score
Win	1–0	Aug 2023	M15 Belém, Brazil	WTT	Hard	(Brazil) Gilbert Klier Jr.	6–1, 6–0
Win	2–0	May 2024	M25 Xalapa, Mexico	WTT	Hard	(Australia) Bernard Tomic	6–7^{(1–7)}, 7–5, 6–4
Loss	2–1	May 2024	M15 Villahermosa, Mexico	WTT	Hard	(Mexico) Ernesto Escobedo	3–6, 5–7
Loss	2–2	Nov 2024	M15 Guatemala City, Guatemala	WTT	Hard	(United States) Evan Zhu	3–6, 6–4, 4–6
Win	3–2	Nov 2024	M15 Morelia, Mexico	WTT	Hard	(United States) Jacob Brumm	7–5, 6–1
Loss	3–3	Apr 2026	M25 Xalapa, Mexico	WTT	Hard	(Netherlands) Mees Röttgering	4–6, 3–6

=== Doubles: 3 (1 title, 2 runner-ups) ===
Legend ITF WTT (1–2)

Result	W–L	Date	Tournament	Tier	Surface	Partner	Opponents	Score
Loss	0–1	May 2024	M15 Villahermosa, Mexico	WTT	Hard	(Mexico) Alex Hernández	(United States) Noah Schachter (Antigua and Barbuda) Herbert Jody Maginley	4–6, 4–6
Win	1–1	Jan 2025	M15 Antalya, Turkiye	WTT	Clay	(Switzerland) Kilian Feldbausch	(Czech Republic) Vít Kalina (Ukraine) Nikita Mashtakov	3–6, 6–2, [10–5]
Loss	1–2	Jan 2025	M15 Antalya, Turkiye	WTT	Clay	(Mexico) Alex Hernández	(Turkey) Gökberk Sarıtaş (Turkey) Mert Naci Türker	6–3, 6–7^{(4–7)}, [10–12]

== Junior Grand Slam finals ==
=== Doubles: 1 (title) ===
Result	Year	Tournament	Surface	Partner	Opponents	Score
Win	2023	French Open	Clay	Yaroslav Demin	(Italy) Lorenzo Sciahbasi (Italy) Gabriele Vulpitta	6–2, 6–3
