= Juan Pablo Ficovich =

Argentine tennis player (born 1997)

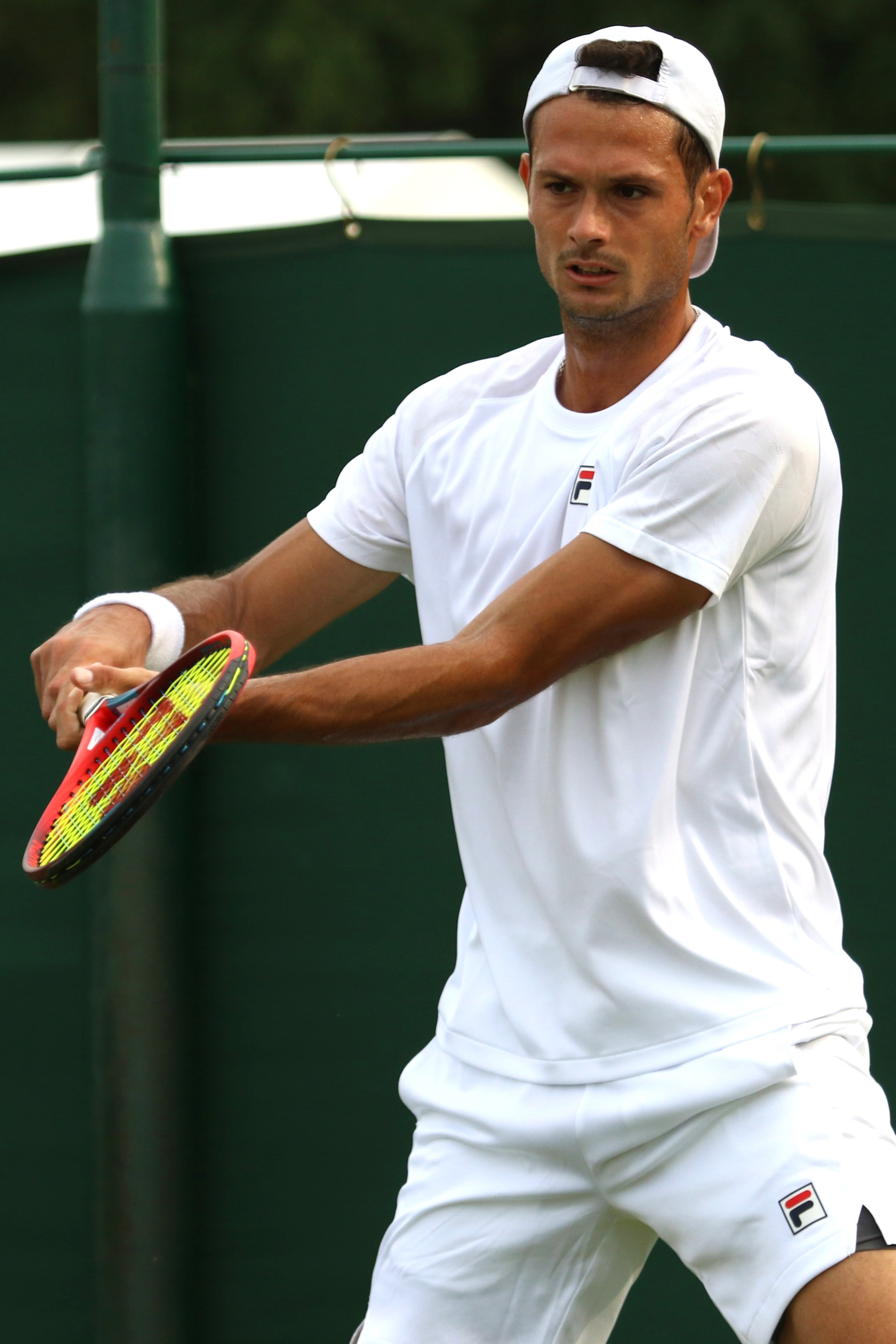
- Ficovich at the 2023 Wimbledon Championships
- Country (sports): Argentina
- Residence: Berazategui, Argentina
- Born: 24 January 1997 (age 29) Buenos Aires, Argentina
- Height: 1.91 m (6 ft 3 in)
- Turned pro: 2015
- Plays: Right-handed (two-handed backhand)
- Coach: Juan Pablo Gandara
- Prize money: US $985,223

Singles
- Career record: 4–5
- Career titles: 0
- Highest ranking: No. 125 (25 July 2022)
- Current ranking: No. 198 (22 June 2026)

Grand Slam singles results
- Australian Open: Q2 (2022, 2025)
- French Open: Q2 (2020, 2022, 2023)
- Wimbledon: Q3 (2025)
- US Open: Q2 (2021)

Doubles
- Career record: 1–3
- Career titles: 0
- Highest ranking: No. 360 (1 August 2022)
- Current ranking: No. 889 (22 June 2026)
- Last updated on: 22 June 2026.

Juan Pablo Ficovich (born 24 January 1997) is an Argentine professional tennis player. He has a career-high ATP singles ranking of No. 125 achieved on 25 July 2022 and a best doubles ranking of No. 360, reached on 1 August 2022.

== Career ==
=== 2020-2021: ATP and Top 200 debuts, First Challenger title ===
Ficovich made his ATP main draw debut at the 2020 Córdoba Open after qualifying for the singles main draw, defeating Pedro Sousa and Filip Horanský, but losing with Gianluca Mager in the first round. A few weeks later, Juan Pablo reached the Challenger final at the 2020 Morelos Open, the second of his career, where he lost in three sets to Jurij Rodionov. He won his first singles ATP challenger title at the 2021 São Paulo Challenger de Tênis.

=== 2022-2025: First ATP win and quarterfinal, top 125 ===
At the 2022 Córdoba Open, Ficovich defeated compatriot Federico Coria in the first round for his first ATP main draw match win as a qualifier, but lost to top seed Diego Schwartzman. He won his second Challenger at the 2022 Open Bogotá defeating Gerald Melzer.

He secured his second ATP win and first since 2022 at the 2025 Los Cabos Open defeating Alibek Kachmazov. Next he upset fourth seed Quentin Halys to reach his first ATP quarterfinal.

== Performance timeline ==
Key
W	F	SF	QF	#R	RR	Q#	DNQ	A	NH

(W) winner; (F) finalist; (SF) semifinalist; (QF) quarterfinalist; (#R) rounds 4, 3, 2, 1; (RR) round-robin stage; (Q#) qualification round; (DNQ) did not qualify; (A) absent; (NH) not held; (SR) strike rate (events won / competed); (W–L) win–loss record.

=== Singles ===
Tournament	2020	2021	2022	2023	2024	2025	2026	SR	W–L	Win %
Grand Slam tournaments
Australian Open	Q1	A	Q2	Q1	A	Q2	Q1	0 / 0	0–0	–
French Open	Q2	A	Q2	Q2	A	Q1	Q1	0 / 0	0–0	–
Wimbledon	NH	Q1	A	Q2	Q1	Q3		0 / 0	0–0	–
US Open	A	Q2	Q1	A	A	Q1		0 / 0	0–0	–
Win–loss	0–0	0–0	0–0	0–0	0–0	0–0	0–0	0 / 0	0–0	–
ATP Masters 1000
Indian Wells Masters	NH	A	A	A	A	A		0 / 0	0–0	–
Miami Open	NH	A	A	A	A	A		0 / 0	0–0	–
Monte Carlo Masters	NH	A	A	A	A	A		0 / 0	0–0	–
Madrid Open	NH	A	A	A	A	A		0 / 0	0-0	–
Italian Open	A	A	A	A	A	Q1		0 / 0	0–0	–
Canadian Open	NH	A	A	A	A	2R		0 / 1	1–1	50%
Cincinnati Masters	A	A	A	A	A	Q1		0 / 0	0–0	–
Shanghai Masters	NH			A	A	A		0 / 0	0–0	–
Paris Masters	A	A	A	A	A	A		0 / 0	0–0	–
Win–loss	0–0	0–0	0–0	0–0	0–0	1–1	0–0	0 / 1	1–1	50%

== ATP Challenger Tour finals ==
=== Singles: 14 (3 titles, 11 runner-ups) ===
Legend ATP Challenger Tour (3–11)	Finals by surface Hard (0–4) Clay (3–7)

Result	W–L	Date	Tournament	Tier	Surface	Opponent	Score
Loss	0–1	Oct 2019	São Paulo Challenger, Brazil	Challenger	Clay	(Peru) Juan Pablo Varillas	6–2, 6–7^{(4–7)}, 2–6
Loss	0–2	Feb 2020	Morelos Open, Mexico	Challenger	Hard	(Austria) Jurij Rodionov	6–4, 2–6, 3–6
Win	1–2	Nov 2021	São Paulo Challenger, Brazil	Challenger	Clay	(Italy) Luciano Darderi	6–3, 7–5
Loss	1–3	Apr 2022	San Marcos-Aguascalientes Open, Mexico	Challenger	Clay	(Switzerland) Marc-Andrea Hüsler	4–6, 6–4, 3–6
Win	2–3	Jul 2022	Open Bogotá, Colombia	Challenger	Clay	(Austria) Gerald Melzer	6–1, 6–2
Loss	2–4	Apr 2023	León Open, Mexico	Challenger	Hard	(France) Giovanni Mpetshi Perricard	7–6^{(7–5)}, 6–7^{(6–8)}, 6–7^{(3–7)}
Loss	2–5	Jul 2023	Open Ciudad de Pozoblanco, Spain	Challenger	Hard	(France) Hugo Grenier	7–6^{(7–4)}, 2–6, 6–7^{(3–7)}
Loss	2–6	Mar 2024	Yucatán Open, Mexico	Challenger	Clay	(United States) Tristan Boyer	6–7^{(6–8)}, 2–6
Loss	2–7	Apr 2024	Challenger Concepción, Chile	Challenger	Clay	(Peru) Gonzalo Bueno	4–6, 0–6
Win	3–7	Sep 2024	Cali Open, Colombia	Challenger	Clay	(Peru) Gonzalo Bueno	6–1, 6–4
Loss	3–8	Oct 2024	Internacional de Campinas, Brazil	Challenger	Clay	(United States) Tristan Boyer	2–6, 6–3, 3–6
Loss	3–9	Mar 2025	Challenger de Córdoba, Argentina	Challenger	Clay	(Argentina) Thiago Agustín Tirante	4–6, 0–6
Loss	3–10	Mar 2025	Yucatán Open, Mexico	Challenger	Clay	(Brazil) Felipe Meligeni Alves	2–6, 6–1, 2–6
Loss	3–11	Mar 2026	Morelia Open, Mexico	Challenger	Hard	(Croatia) Borna Gojo	6–7^{(5–7)}, 2–6

== ITF Tour finals ==
=== Singles: 15 (10 titles, 5 runner-ups) ===
Legend ITF Futures/WTT (10–5)	Finals by surface Hard (–) Clay (10–5)

Result	W–L	Date	Tournament	Tier	Surface	Opponent	Score
Loss	0–1	Aug 2014	Argentina F14, San Juan	Futures	Clay	(Japan) Ryusei Makiguchi	5–7, 6–2, 4–6
Win	1–1	Sep 2016	Belgium F14, Damme	Futures	Clay	(Germany) Marvin Netuschil	6–4, 4–6, 7–5
Win	2–1	May 2017	Italy F12, Naples	Futures	Clay	(Netherlands) Boy Westerhof	6–3, 6–4
Loss	2–2	Jul 2017	Belgium F4, Lasne	Futures	Clay	(France) Corentin Denolly	3–6, 0–6
Win	3–2	Jul 2017	Czech Republic F6, Brno	Futures	Clay	(Czech Republic) Jan Mertl	7–5, 6–4
Win	4–2	Apr 2018	Italy F6, Santa Margherita di Pula	Futures	Clay	(Italy) Luca Vanni	6–3, 7–6^{(7–5)}
Win	5–2	Jul 2018	France F11, Montauban	Futures	Clay	(United States) Ulises Blanch	6–7^{(5–7)}, 6–3, 6–3
Win	6–2	May 2019	M15 Brčko, Bosnia and Herzegovina	WTT	Clay	(Australia) Christopher O'Connell	6–4, 6–4
Win	7–2	Jun 2019	M15 São José do Rio Preto, Brazil	WTT	Clay	(Brazil) Rafael Matos	6–4, 6–2
Win	8–2	Jun 2019	M15 Curitiba, Brazil	WTT	Clay	(Brazil) João Pedro Sorgi	6–3, 7–6^{(7–3)}
Win	9–2	Jul 2019	M25 Buenos Aires, Argentina	WTT	Clay	(Argentina) Francisco Cerúndolo	7–5, 6–7^{(5–7)}, 6–3
Loss	9–3	Jul 2019	M15 Buenos Aires, Argentina	WTT	Clay	(Argentina) Genaro Olivieri	4–6, 6–2, 6–7^{(4–7)}
Loss	9–4	Aug 2019	M25 Portoviejo, Ecuador	WTT	Clay	(Chile) Marcelo Tomás Barrios Vera	2–6, 0–6
Loss	9–5	Aug 2023	M25 Trujillo, Peru	WTT	Clay	(Brazil) Gustavo Heide	3–6, 0–6
Win	10–5	Mar 2024	M25 Recife, Brazil	WTT	Clay	(Kazakhstan) Dmitry Popko	6–4, 6–7^{(4–7)}, 6–3
