= Alan Fernando Rubio Fierros =

Mexican tennis player (born 1999)

- Country (sports): Mexico
- Born: 3 February 1999 (age 27)
- Height: 1.75 m (5 ft 9 in)
- Plays: Right-handed
- Prize money: US $68,005

Singles
- Career record: 1–3 (at ATP Tour level, Grand Slam level, and in Davis Cup)
- Career titles: 0
- Highest ranking: No. 569 (30 March 2026)
- Current ranking: No. 573 (20 July 2026)

Doubles
- Career record: 0–0 (at ATP Tour level, Grand Slam level, and in Davis Cup)
- Career titles: 0
- Highest ranking: No. 510 (12 August 2024)
- Current ranking: No. 1,259 (30 March 2026)
- Last updated on: 30 March 2026.

Alan Fernando Rubio Fierros (born 3 February 1999) is a Mexican tennis player. Rubio Fierros has a career high ATP singles ranking of world No. 569 achieved on 30 March 2026 and a career high ATP doubles ranking of No. 510 achieved on that 12 August 2024.

Rubio Fierros represents Mexico at the Davis Cup, where he has a W/L record of 0–2.

== Career ==
He received wildcards for the qualifying competition at the 2024 Los Cabos Open and also for the 2024 Abierto Mexicano Telcel in Acapulco.
