= 2026 Soma Bay Open – Doubles =

Doubles
- 2026 Soma Bay Open

Final
- Champions: (Sweden) Erik Grevelius (Sweden) Adam Heinonen
- Runners-up: (Mexico) Alex Hernández (Mexico) Rodrigo Pacheco Méndez
- Score: 6–2, 6–3

Events
Singles	Doubles
- Soma Bay Open

Sergey Betov and Daniil Ostapenkov were the defending champions but lost in the first round to Max Westphal and Theodore Winegar.

Erik Grevelius and Adam Heinonen won the title after defeating Alex Hernández and Rodrigo Pacheco Méndez 6–2, 6–3 in the final.

== Seeds ==
1. (Romania) Victor Vlad Cornea / (Croatia) Nino Serdarušić (first round)
2. (Poland) Piotr Matuszewski / (Finland) Patrik Niklas-Salminen (semifinals)
3. Ivan Liutarevich / (Czech Republic) David Poljak (quarterfinals)
4. (Belgium) Michael Geerts / (Germany) Tim Rühl (quarterfinals)

== Draw ==
Key

- Q = Qualifier
- WC = Wild card
- LL = Lucky loser
- Alt = Alternate
- ITF = ITF entry
- PR = Protected ranking
- SR = Special ranking
- SE = Special exempt
- JE = Junior exempt
- JR = Junior Accelerator Programme entrant
- CO = College Accelerator Programme entrant
- NG = Next Gen Accelerator Program entrant
- w/o = Walkover
- r = Retired
- d = Defaulted

First round
1	(Romania) V Cornea (Croatia) N Serdarušić	4	2
(Sweden) E Grevelius (Sweden) A Heinonen	6	6
(Netherlands) M Hermans (Germany) K Wehnelt	6^{6}	2
(France) G Blancaneaux (France) M Martineau	7^{8}	6
3	I Liutarevich (Czech Republic) D Poljak	6	6^{2}	[10]
(India) SDP Dev (India) Nitin Kumar Sinha	2	7^{7}	[4]
PR	(India) S Banthia (India) S Myneni	6	7^{10}
WC	(Turkey) S Mert Özdemir (Turkey) MN Türker	0	6^{8}
(Mexico) A Hernández (Mexico) R Pacheco Méndez	7^{7}	6
(Republic of Ireland) C Barry (Spain) Ignasi Forcano	6^{4}	3
WC	(Egypt) Michael Bassem Sobhy (Egypt) Fares Zakaria	4	3
4	(Belgium) M Geerts (Germany) T Rühl	6	6
(France) M Westphal (United States) T Winegar	6	6
S Betov; D Ostapenkov	4	2
(Czech Republic) D Kellovský (Germany) P Zahraj	3	5
2	(Poland) P Matuszewski (Finland) P Niklas-Salminen	6	7

Quarterfinals
(Sweden) E Grevelius (Sweden) A Heinonen	6	6
(France) G Blancaneaux (France) M Martineau	4	4
3	I Liutarevich (Czech Republic) D Poljak	6^{4}	4
PR	(India) S Banthia (India) S Myneni	7^{7}	6
(Mexico) A Hernández (Mexico) R Pacheco Méndez	4	6	[10]
4	(Belgium) M Geerts (Germany) T Rühl	6	4	[4]
(France) M Westphal (United States) T Winegar	3	6	[5]
2	(Poland) P Matuszewski (Finland) P Niklas-Salminen	6	4	[10]

Semifinals
(Sweden) E Grevelius (Sweden) A Heinonen	6	7
PR	(India) S Banthia (India) S Myneni	2	5
(Mexico) A Hernández (Mexico) R Pacheco Méndez	6	1	[10]
2	(Poland) P Matuszewski (Finland) P Niklas-Salminen	3	6	[5]

Final
(Sweden) E Grevelius (Sweden) A Heinonen	6	6
(Mexico) A Hernández (Mexico) R Pacheco Méndez	2	3
