= 2025 Soma Bay Open – Doubles =

Doubles
- 2025 Soma Bay Open

Final
- Champions: Sergey Betov; Daniil Ostapenkov
- Runners-up: (Egypt) Michael Bassem Sobhy (Egypt) Fares Zakaria
- Score: 6–4, 6–2

Events
Singles	Doubles
- Soma Bay Open

This was the first edition of the tournament.

Sergey Betov and Daniil Ostapenkov won the title after defeating Michael Bassem Sobhy and Fares Zakaria 6–4, 6–2 in the final.

== Seeds ==
1. Daniil Golubev / (Poland) Szymon Walków (quarterfinals)
2. (Zimbabwe) Courtney John Lock / (Canada) Kelsey Stevenson (quarterfinals)
3. (Italy) Simone Agostini / (Czech Republic) Dominik Kellovský (first round)
4. Egor Agafonov / (Tunisia) Aziz Ouakaa (first round)

== Draw ==
Key

- Q = Qualifier
- WC = Wild card
- LL = Lucky loser
- Alt = Alternate
- ITF = ITF entry
- PR = Protected ranking
- SR = Special ranking
- SE = Special exempt
- JE = Junior exempt
- JR = Junior Accelerator Programme entrant
- CO = College Accelerator Programme entrant
- NG = Next Gen Accelerator Program entrant
- w/o = Walkover
- r = Retired
- d = Defaulted

First round
1	D Golubev (Poland) S Walków	6	7
(Germany) R Molleker (Ukraine) Vadym Ursu	2	5
WC	(Egypt) Michael Bassem Sobhy (Egypt) Fares Zakaria	6	6^{0}	[10]
(Germany) J Opitz (Germany) Tom Zeuch	4	7^{7}	[5]
4	E Agafonov (Tunisia) A Ouakaa	5	6	[8]
(France) Mathys Erhard (Netherlands) J Sels	7	2	[10]
WC	(United Kingdom) Viktor Frydrych (United Kingdom) Charlie Robertson
S Betov; D Ostapenkov	w/o
(Bosnia and Herzegovina) M Bašić (United States) Dali Blanch	7^{7}	6
3	(Italy) Simone Agostini (Czech Republic) D Kellovský	6^{5}	1
I Simakin; Pavel Verbin	w/o
(Moldova) R Albot (Kazakhstan) D Yevseyev
Alt	(Germany) Edison Ambarzumjan (Ukraine) Yurii Dzhavakian	6^{3}	6^{1}
2	(Zimbabwe) CJ Lock (Canada) K Stevenson	7^{7}	7^{7}

Quarterfinals
1	D Golubev (Poland) S Walków	1	3
WC	(Egypt) M Bassem Sobhy (Egypt) F Zakaria	6	6
(France) M Erhard (Netherlands) J Sels	6	6
P Bar Biryukov (Italy) A Binda	3	4
S Betov; D Ostapenkov	7	7
(Bosnia and Herzegovina) M Bašić (United States) Dal Blanch	5	5
I Simakin; P Verbin	6	6
2	(Zimbabwe) CJ Lock (Canada) K Stevenson	2	3

Semifinals
WC	(Egypt) M Bassem Sobhy (Egypt) F Zakaria	w/o
(France) M Erhard (Netherlands) J Sels
S Betov; D Ostapenkov	6	3	[11]
I Simakin; P Verbin	2	6	[9]

Final
WC	(Egypt) M Bassem Sobhy (Egypt) F Zakaria	4	2
S Betov; D Ostapenkov	6	6
