= 2025 Soma Bay Open =

- Date: 17–23 November
- Edition: 1st
- Surface: Hard
- Location: Soma Bay, Egypt

Champions

Singles
- (United Kingdom) Toby Samuel

Doubles
- Sergey Betov / Daniil Ostapenkov
- Soma Bay Open

The 2025 Soma Bay Open was a professional tennis tournament played on hardcourts. It was the first edition of the tournament which was part of the 2025 ATP Challenger Tour. It took place in Soma Bay, Egypt between 17 and 23 November 2025.

== Singles main draw entrants ==
=== Seeds ===
Country	Player	Rank^{1}	Seed
GBR	Jay Clarke	213	1
	Ilia Simakin	271	2
	Petr Bar Biryukov	312	3
FRA	Mathys Erhard	313	4
GBR	Giles Hussey	332	5
NED	Jelle Sels	348	6
CZE	Maxim Mrva	357	7
ITA	Alexandr Binda	396	8

- ^{1} Rankings as of 10 November 2025.

=== Other entrants ===
The following players received wildcards into the singles main draw:

- (Egypt) Michael Bassem Sobhy
- (Switzerland) Henry Bernet
- (Egypt) Amr Elsayed

The following player received entry into the singles main draw through the Junior Accelerator programme:

- (United Kingdom) Charlie Robertson

The following players received entry from the qualifying draw:

- (Ukraine) Yurii Dzhavakian
- (Hungary) Péter Fajta
- (Czech Republic) Dominik Kellovský
- (Germany) Jannik Opitz
- (Tunisia) Aziz Ouakaa
- (United Kingdom) Matthew Summers

== Champions ==
=== Singles ===
- (United Kingdom) Toby Samuel def. (United Kingdom) Jay Clarke 4–6, 7–6^{(7–4)}, 6–0.

=== Doubles ===
- Sergey Betov / Daniil Ostapenkov def. (Egypt) Michael Bassem Sobhy / (Egypt) Fares Zakaria 6–4, 6–2.
