= 2025 Challenger Ciudad de Guayaquil – Singles =

Singles
- 2025 Challenger Ciudad de Guayaquil

Final
- Champion: (Paraguay) Daniel Vallejo
- Runner-up: (Peru) Juan Pablo Varillas
- Score: 7–5, 6–7^{(7–9)}, 6–3

Events
Singles	Doubles
- Challenger Ciudad de Guayaquil

Federico Agustín Gómez was the defending champion but lost in the semifinals to Juan Pablo Varillas.

Daniel Vallejo won the title after defeating Varillas 7–5, 6–7^{(7–9)}, 6–3 in the final.

== Seeds ==
1. (Chile) Tomás Barrios Vera (withdrew)
2. (Paraguay) Daniel Vallejo (champion)
3. (Lebanon) Hady Habib (quarterfinals)
4. (Ecuador) Álvaro Guillén Meza (semifinals)
5. (Peru) Gonzalo Bueno (second round)
6. (Mexico) Rodrigo Pacheco Méndez (first round)
7. (Bolivia) Murkel Dellien (second round)
8. (Argentina) Federico Agustín Gómez (semifinals)
9. (Ecuador) Andrés Andrade (quarterfinals)

== Draw ==
Key

- Q = Qualifier
- WC = Wild card
- LL = Lucky loser
- Alt = Alternate
- ITF = ITF entry
- PR = Protected ranking
- SR = Special ranking
- SE = Special exempt
- JE = Junior exempt
- JR = Junior Accelerator Programme entrant
- CO = College Accelerator Programme entrant
- NG = Next Gen Accelerator Program entrant
- w/o = Walkover
- r = Retired
- d = Defaulted

=== Finals ===
Semifinals
8	(Argentina) Federico Agustín Gómez	4	4
(Peru) Juan Pablo Varillas	6	6
4	(Ecuador) Álvaro Guillén Meza	6	2	3
2	(Paraguay) Daniel Vallejo	4	6	6

Final
(Peru) Juan Pablo Varillas	5	7^{9}	3
2	(Paraguay) Daniel Vallejo	7	6^{7}	6

=== Top half ===
First round
9	(Ecuador) A Andrade	6	6
(Romania) Sebastian Gima	1	2
(Spain) D Jordà Sanchis	3	6	6
Q	(Peru) A Huertas del Pino	6	4	3
(Brazil) PA Saraiva dos Santos	6	1	7
WC	(Ecuador) Lucas Yúnez	4	6	5
Q	(Argentina) Tomás Martínez	2	1
8	(Argentina) FA Gómez	6	6
3	(Lebanon) H Habib	6	6
Q	(Colombia) Salvador Price	2	0
(Uruguay) F Roncadelli	6^{6}	0^{r}
Alt	(Uruguay) J Aguilar Cardozo	7^{8}	3
LL	(Canada) JC Aguilar	4	1
(Peru) JP Varillas	6	6
Alt	(United States) Ryan Dickerson	1	1
7	(Bolivia) M Dellien	6	6

Second round
9	(Ecuador) A Andrade	7^{7}	3	6
(Spain) D Jordà Sanchis	6^{5}	6	2
(Brazil) PA Saraiva dos Santos	1	6^{6}
8	(Argentina) FA Gómez	6	7^{8}
3	(Lebanon) H Habib	6	7
Alt	(Uruguay) J Aguilar Cardozo	3	5
(Peru) JP Varillas	6	7
7	(Bolivia) M Dellien	0	5

Quarterfinals
9	(Ecuador) A Andrade	3	6	4
8	(Argentina) FA Gómez	6	2	6
3	(Lebanon) H Habib	5	6	3
(Peru) JP Varillas	7	3	6

Semifinals
8	(Argentina) FA Gómez	4	4
(Peru) JP Varillas	6	6

=== Bottom half ===
First round
6	(Mexico) R Pacheco Méndez	6	0	0
(Argentina) F Mena	3	6	6
(Argentina) Lorenzo Joaquín Rodríguez	4	2
Alt	(Argentina) Juan Estévez	6	6
(Argentina) H Casanova	6	4	6
(Mexico) A Hernández	2	6	2
WC	(Ecuador) Emilio Camacho	2	3
4	(Ecuador) Á Guillén Meza	6	6
5	(Peru) G Bueno	6	6
Q	(Uruguay) Federico Aguilar Cardozo	2	4
(United States) Tristan McCormick	2	5
(Argentina) LE Ambrogi	6	7
Q	(Venezuela) LD Martínez	6^{3}	6	4
WC	(Ecuador) Mario André Galarraga	7^{7}	2	0^{r}
Q	(Argentina) Lucio Ratti	2	1
2	(Paraguay) AD Vallejo	6	6

Second round
(Argentina) F Mena	7	4	6
Alt	(Argentina) J Estévez	5	6	0
(Argentina) H Casanova	1	0^{r}
4	(Ecuador) Á Guillén Meza	6	3
5	(Peru) G Bueno	2	1
(Argentina) LE Ambrogi	6	6
Q	(Venezuela) LD Martínez	2	3
2	(Paraguay) AD Vallejo	6	6

Quarterfinals
(Argentina) F Mena	1	4
4	(Ecuador) Á Guillén Meza	6	6
(Argentina) LE Ambrogi	2	4
2	(Paraguay) AD Vallejo	6	6

Semifinals
4	(Ecuador) Á Guillén Meza	6	2	3
2	(Paraguay) AD Vallejo	4	6	6
