= 2026 Soma Bay Open =

- Date: 19–25 January
- Edition: 2nd
- Surface: Hard
- Location: Soma Bay, Egypt

Champions

Singles
- (South Africa) Lloyd Harris

Doubles
- (Sweden) Erik Grevelius / (Sweden) Adam Heinonen
- Soma Bay Open

The 2026 Soma Bay Open was a professional tennis tournament played on hardcourts. It was the second edition of the tournament which was part of the 2026 ATP Challenger Tour. It took place in Soma Bay, Egypt between 19 and 25 January 2026.

== Singles main draw entrants ==
=== Seeds ===
| Country | Player | Rank^{1} | Seed |
|---|---|---|---|
| NED | Guy den Ouden | 160 | 1 |
| GBR | Jay Clarke | 178 | 2 |
| GBR | Jack Pinnington Jones | 196 | 3 |
| ITA | Lorenzo Giustino | 210 | 4 |
| RSA | Lloyd Harris | 221 | 5 |
| KAZ | Dmitry Popko | 222 | 6 |
| AUT | Lukas Neumayer | 226 | 7 |
| MEX | Rodrigo Pacheco Méndez | 232 | 8 |

- ^{1} Rankings as of 12 January 2026.

=== Other entrants ===
The following players received wildcards into the singles main draw:

- (Egypt) Michael Bassem Sobhy
- (France) Benoît Paire
- (Egypt) Fares Zakaria

The following players received entry from the qualifying draw:

- (Moldova) Radu Albot
- (Netherlands) Thijs Boogaard
- Svyatoslav Gulin
- (Turkey) Ergi Kırkın
- (United States) Maxwell McKennon
- (Italy) Stefano Napolitano

== Champions ==
=== Singles ===
- (South Africa) Lloyd Harris def. (United Kingdom) Jack Pinnington Jones 6–1, 5–2 ret.

=== Doubles ===
- (Sweden) Erik Grevelius / (Sweden) Adam Heinonen def. (Mexico) Alex Hernández / (Mexico) Rodrigo Pacheco Méndez 6–2, 6–3.
