= 2026 Soma Bay Open – Singles =

Singles
- 2026 Soma Bay Open

Final
- Champion: (South Africa) Lloyd Harris
- Runner-up: (United Kingdom) Jack Pinnington Jones
- Score: 6–1, 5–2 ret.

Events
Singles	Doubles
- Soma Bay Open

Toby Samuel was the defending champion but chose not to defend his title.

Lloyd Harris won the title after Jack Pinnington Jones retired trailing 1–6, 2–5 in the final.

== Seeds ==
1. (Netherlands) Guy den Ouden (first round)
2. (United Kingdom) Jay Clarke (first round)
3. (United Kingdom) Jack Pinnington Jones (final, retired)
4. (Italy) Lorenzo Giustino (first round)
5. (South Africa) Lloyd Harris (champion)
6. (Kazakhstan) Dmitry Popko (first round)
7. (Austria) Lukas Neumayer (quarterfinals)
8. (Mexico) Rodrigo Pacheco Méndez (quarterfinals)

== Draw ==
Key

- Q = Qualifier
- WC = Wild card
- LL = Lucky loser
- Alt = Alternate
- ITF = ITF entry
- PR = Protected ranking
- SR = Special ranking
- SE = Special exempt
- JE = Junior exempt
- JR = Junior Accelerator Programme entrant
- CO = College Accelerator Programme entrant
- NG = Next Gen Accelerator Program entrant
- w/o = Walkover
- r = Retired
- d = Defaulted

=== Finals ===
Semifinals
(Lithuania) Edas Butvilas	7^{7}	5	3
5	(South Africa) Lloyd Harris	6^{2}	7	6
3	(United Kingdom) Jack Pinnington Jones	7^{7}	6
(Croatia) Borna Gojo	6^{5}	1

Final
5	(South Africa) Lloyd Harris	6	5
3	(United Kingdom) Jack Pinnington Jones	1	2^{r}

=== Top half ===
First round
1	(Netherlands) G den Ouden	5	6	3
(Lithuania) E Butvilas	7	3	6
(Croatia) D Ajduković	7	1	7^{7}
Q	Svyatoslav Gulin	5	6	6^{2}
Q	(Turkey) E Kırkın	2	6	6
Q	(Netherlands) T Boogaard	6	3	3
Q	(United States) Maxwell McKennon	1	4
8	(Mexico) R Pacheco Méndez	6	6
4	(Italy) L Giustino	2	1
(France) G Blancaneaux	6	6
(Czech Republic) M Mrva	6	6
Q	(Moldova) R Albot	3	1
(Belgium) M Geerts	7^{7}	6
(France) M Martineau	6^{3}	1
(Georgia (country)) S Purtseladze	2	2
5	(South Africa) L Harris	6	6

Second round
(Lithuania) E Butvilas	6	7^{8}
(Croatia) D Ajduković	1	6^{6}
Q	(Turkey) E Kırkın	5	4
8	(Mexico) R Pacheco Méndez	7	6
(France) G Blancaneaux	2	4
(Czech Republic) M Mrva	6	6
(Belgium) M Geerts	1	7^{7}	1
5	(South Africa) L Harris	6	6^{5}	6

Quarterfinals
(Lithuania) E Butvilas	6	6
8	(Mexico) R Pacheco Méndez	1	4
(Czech Republic) M Mrva	3	7	2
5	(South Africa) L Harris	6	5	6

Semifinals
(Lithuania) E Butvilas	7^{7}	5	3
5	(South Africa) L Harris	6^{2}	7	6

=== Bottom half ===
First round
6	(Kazakhstan) D Popko	6	3	2
(Belgium) K Coppejans	1	6	6
WC	(Egypt) Fares Zakaria	2	1
(Germany) P Zahraj	6	6
(Norway) V Durasovic	4	6	6
WC	(France) B Paire	6	3	1
(Germany) T Gentzsch	1	6^{5}
3	(United Kingdom) J Pinnington Jones	6	7^{7}
7	(Austria) L Neumayer	6	6
(Bulgaria) D Kuzmanov	4	0
WC	(Egypt) Michael Bassem Sobhy	6	3	6
(Austria) S Kopp	4	6	3
(Austria) J Schwärzler	3	7^{7}	0
Q	(Italy) S Napolitano	6	6^{0}	0^{r}
(Croatia) B Gojo	6	6
2	(United Kingdom) J Clarke	1	4

Second round
(Belgium) K Coppejans	6^{4}	4
(Germany) P Zahraj	7^{7}	6
(Norway) V Durasovic	1	4
3	(United Kingdom) J Pinnington Jones	6	6
7	(Austria) L Neumayer	6	7^{7}
WC	(Egypt) M Bassem Sobhy	1	6^{3}
(Austria) J Schwärzler	4	1
(Croatia) B Gojo	6	6

Quarterfinals
(Germany) P Zahraj	1	2
3	(United Kingdom) J Pinnington Jones	6	6
7	(Austria) L Neumayer	7	5	3
(Croatia) B Gojo	5	7	6

Semifinals
3	(United Kingdom) J Pinnington Jones	7^{7}	6
(Croatia) B Gojo	6^{5}	1
