= 2025 Soma Bay Open – Singles =

Singles
- 2025 Soma Bay Open

Final
- Champion: (United Kingdom) Toby Samuel
- Runner-up: (United Kingdom) Jay Clarke
- Score: 4–6, 7–6^{(7–4)}, 6–0

Events
Singles	Doubles
- Soma Bay Open

This was the first edition of the tournament.

Toby Samuel won the title after defeating Jay Clarke 4–6, 7–6^{(7–4)}, 6–0 in the final.

== Seeds ==
1. (United Kingdom) Jay Clarke (final)
2. Ilia Simakin (first round)
3. Petr Bar Biryukov (first round)
4. (France) Mathys Erhard (semifinals)
5. (United Kingdom) Giles Hussey (second round)
6. (Netherlands) Jelle Sels (quarterfinals)
7. (Czech Republic) Maxim Mrva (quarterfinals)
8. (Italy) Alexandr Binda (quarterfinals)

== Draw ==
Key

- Q = Qualifier
- WC = Wild card
- LL = Lucky loser
- Alt = Alternate
- ITF = ITF entry
- PR = Protected ranking
- SR = Special ranking
- SE = Special exempt
- JE = Junior exempt
- JR = Junior Accelerator Programme entrant
- CO = College Accelerator Programme entrant
- NG = Next Gen Accelerator Program entrant
- w/o = Walkover
- r = Retired
- d = Defaulted

=== Finals ===
Semifinals
1	(United Kingdom) Jay Clarke	6	6
4	(France) Mathys Erhard	1	3
JR	(United Kingdom) Charlie Robertson	1	1
(United Kingdom) Toby Samuel	6	6

Final
1	(United Kingdom) Jay Clarke	6	6^{4}	0
(United Kingdom) Toby Samuel	4	7^{7}	6

=== Top half ===
First round
1	(United Kingdom) J Clarke	6	6
(Egypt) Fares Zakaria	1	3
(Austria) Sebastian Sorger	7	4	1
(Kazakhstan) D Yevseyev	5	6	6
(Moldova) R Albot	6	7
(Ukraine) V Orlov	3	5
WC	(Switzerland) H Bernet	3	4
5	(United Kingdom) G Hussey	6	6
4	(France) Mathys Erhard	7^{7}	7^{7}
Q	(United Kingdom) M Summers	6^{5}	6^{1}
(Germany) R Molleker	3	3
(Italy) Pietro Fellin	6	6
(Ukraine) Vadym Ursu	6	6
E Agafonov	3	1
(Spain) P Vives Marcos	6	2	0^{r}
7	(Czech Republic) M Mrva	4	6	0

Second round
1	(United Kingdom) J Clarke	6	4	6
(Kazakhstan) D Yevseyev	4	6	4
(Moldova) R Albot	1	7^{7}	6
5	(United Kingdom) G Hussey	6	6^{3}	3
4	(France) M Erhard	6	2	6
(Italy) P Fellin	2	6	4
(Ukraine) V Ursu	7^{7}	1	4
7	(Czech Republic) M Mrva	6^{5}	6	6

Quarterfinals
1	(United Kingdom) J Clarke	6	6^{3}	6
(Moldova) R Albot	2	7^{7}	2
4	(France) M Erhard	6	6
7	(Czech Republic) M Mrva	3	2

Semifinals
1	(United Kingdom) J Clarke	6	6
4	(France) M Erhard	1	3

=== Bottom half ===
First round
6	(Netherlands) J Sels	6	6
Q	(Tunisia) A Ouakaa	0	3
(Turkey) Mert Alkaya	5^{r}
Q	(Germany) J Opitz	6
WC	(Egypt) Amr Elsayed	6	1	4
JR	(United Kingdom) Charlie Robertson	3	6	6
Q	(Czech Republic) D Kellovský	7^{7}	7^{7}
3	P Bar Biryukov	6^{4}	6^{3}
8	(Italy) A Binda	6	6
Q	(Ukraine) Yurii Dzhavakian	3	1
WC	(Egypt) Michael Bassem Sobhy	6	6^{5}	7^{8}
(Bosnia and Herzegovina) M Bašić	3	7^{7}	6^{6}
(United States) Dali Blanch	1	4
Q	(Hungary) Péter Fajta	6	6
(United Kingdom) T Samuel	6	6
2	I Simakin	4	4

Second round
6	(Netherlands) J Sels	6	7
Q	(Germany) J Opitz	2	5
JR	(United Kingdom) C Robertson	6	6
Q	(Czech Republic) D Kellovský	1	4
8	(Italy) A Binda	6	6
WC	(Egypt) M Bassem Sobhy	2	4
Q	(Hungary) P Fajta	3	6^{4}
(United Kingdom) T Samuel	6	7^{7}

Quarterfinals
6	(Netherlands) J Sels	3	2
JR	(United Kingdom) C Robertson	6	6
8	(Italy) A Binda	2	3
(United Kingdom) T Samuel	6	6

Semifinals
JR	(United Kingdom) C Robertson	1	1
(United Kingdom) T Samuel	6	6
