= Lloyd Harris (tennis) =

South African tennis player (born 1997)

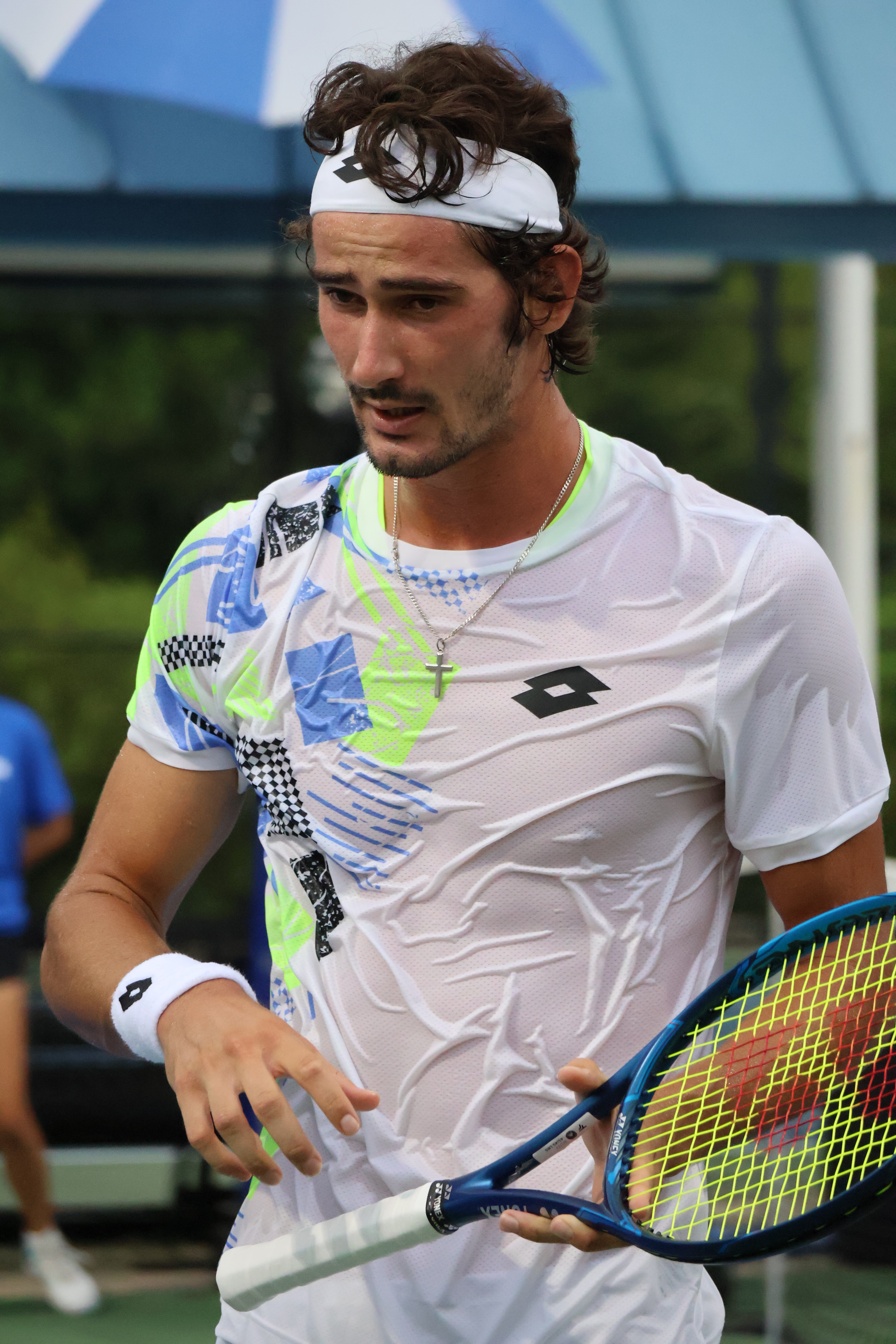
- Harris at the 2023 Cary Challenger
- Full name: Lloyd George Muirhead Harris
- Country (sports): South Africa
- Residence: Cape Town, South Africa
- Born: 24 February 1997 (age 29) Cape Town, South Africa
- Height: 1.93 m (6 ft 4 in)
- Turned pro: 2015
- Plays: Right-handed (two handed-backhand)
- Coach: Anthony Harris
- Prize money: US $4,768,889

Singles
- Career record: 79–86 (at ATP Tour level, Grand Slam level, and in Davis Cup)
- Career titles: 0
- Highest ranking: No. 31 (13 September 2021)
- Current ranking: No. 139 (31 August 2026)

Grand Slam singles results
- Australian Open: 3R (2021)
- French Open: 2R (2019, 2020, 2021)
- Wimbledon: 2R (2021, 2024, 2025)
- US Open: QF (2021)

Doubles
- Career record: 22–22 (at ATP Tour level, Grand Slam level, and in Davis Cup)
- Career titles: 1
- Highest ranking: No. 108 (6 June 2022)

Grand Slam doubles results
- Australian Open: 3R (2023)
- French Open: 2R (2021)
- Wimbledon: 3R (2023)
- US Open: 2R (2021, 2023)

Team competitions
- Davis Cup: 15–7
- Last updated on: 31 August 2026.

Lloyd George Muirhead Harris (born 24 February 1997) is a South African professional tennis player. He has been ranked as high as world No. 31 in singles by the ATP, achieved on 13 September 2021 and has a career-high doubles ranking of world No. 108, achieved on 6 June 2022. Harris has won one doubles ATP tournament, seven ATP Challenger singles titles, two Challenger doubles title, 13 ITF singles titles, and four ITF doubles titles.

== Juniors ==
In November 2012, Harris won his first ITF junior singles title at the G5 in Windhoek, Namibia. In August 2014, Harris represented South Africa at the Youth Olympic Games.

As a junior, Harris reached a ranking of No. 38 by the International Tennis Federation, and he compiled a singles win–loss record of 73-44.

== Professional career ==
=== 2015 – 2017: Turned Pro, ATP debut ===
Harris turned pro in 2015. During the 2015 and 2016 seasons, Harris mainly played in the ITF Futures tour. In June 2015, Harris won his first ITF Futures singles title in Mozambique F2. Harris also won his first ITF Futures Doubles title in June 2015. Harris reached five ITF Futures tour single finals, winning four. In 2016, Harris reached eight ITF Futures tour finals, winning six.

In 2017, he reached Challenger tour semifinals in Kyoto, Japan and Kaohsiung, Chinese Taipei. He also qualified for his first ATP World Tour event in Antalya, Turkey, where he entered the main draw as a lucky loser.

=== 2018: Grand Slam debut, First ATP match win ===
Harris started the year reaching four ITF Futures tour finals, winning three. He had a successful American hard-court summer season, winning his first ATP Challenger title at the Kentucky Bank Tennis Championships.

In August, he qualified for his first main draw at a Grand Slam at the 2018 US Open through the qualifying rounds.

In September, Harris won his first main draw match on the ATP World Tour when he defeated Gaël Monfils in the first round of the Chengdu Open (ATP 250 event) in China.

On 7 October 2018, Harris won his second ATP Challenger title of the year by defeating Marc Polmans at the Stockton Challenger.

=== 2019: Top 100 debut ===
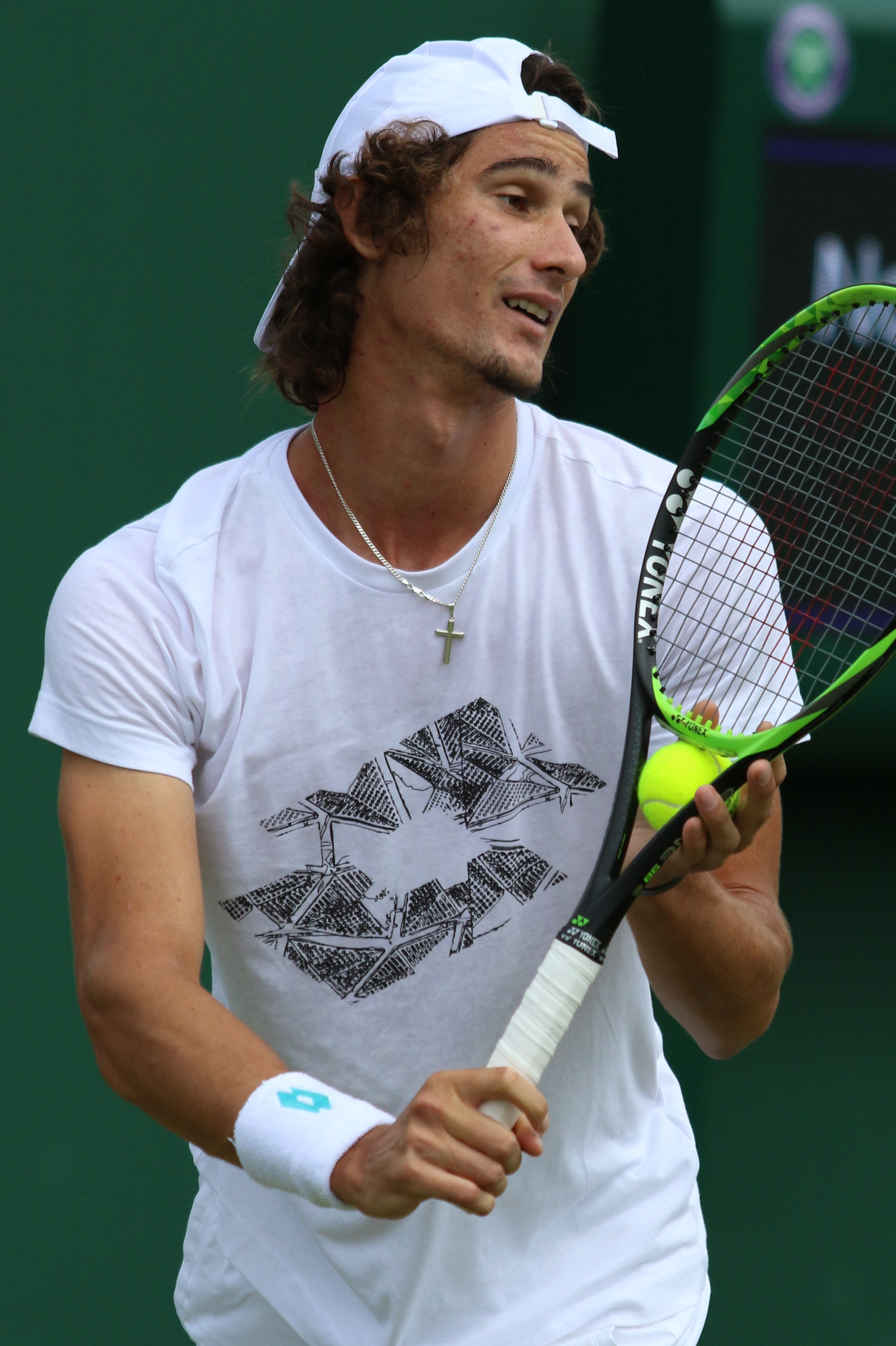
Harris at the 2019 Wimbledon Championships

In January, Harris qualified for his second main draw at a Grand Slam at the 2019 Australian Open.

On 4 February 2019, due to his victory at the Launceston Tennis International, Harris reached World No. 100 in the ATP rankings.

In May he reached the second round of the 2019 French Open for the first time with a win over Lukáš Rosol.

Harris also entered the main draw of the 2019 Wimbledon Championships for the first time and the 2019 US Open for the second time.

In September, he made his first ATP 250 semifinal at the Chengdu Open in China.

=== 2021: first top 10 win, ATP 500 final, Major quarterfinal ===
Harris started his 2021 season in February at the Murray River Open. He lost in the first round to Egor Gerasimov. Ranked 91 at the Australian Open, he reached the third round of a Grand Slam for the first time; he lost to Mackenzie McDonald.

Seeded seventh at the Singapore Open, Harris was defeated in the first round by wildcard Adrian Andreev. Getting past qualifying at the Qatar ExxonMobil Open, he upset Stan Wawrinka in the first round. He lost in the second round to Márton Fucsovics.

Harris then qualified for the Dubai Tennis Championships. After beating Christopher O'Connell, he won his first match against a top 10 player by defeating world no. 3 Dominic Thiem in the first round. Harris then beat Filip Krajinović, Kei Nishikori and third seed Denis Shapovalov to reach his first ATP 500 final. He lost in the final to Aslan Karatsev.

In Washington, Harris, seeded 14th, defeated Tennys Sandgren and Rafael Nadal to reach the quarterfinals, where he lost to Nishikori.

At the US Open, Harris defeated Karen Khachanov and Ernesto Escobedo to reach the third round of a Grand Slam for the second time in his career. He then defeated Denis Shapovalov for the third top 10 win of his career. In the fourth round, he defeated Reilly Opelka to reach his first Grand Slam quarterfinal. He was defeated by world no. 4 Alexander Zverev in the quarterfinals. As a result, he made his debut in the top 40.

=== 2022: Masters 1000 fourth round, surgery, and early end of season ===
Harris started his 2022 season at the Adelaide International 2, losing in the first round to Kwon Soon-woo. Seeded 30th at the Australian Open, he was defeated in the first round by Australian wildcard, Aleksandar Vukic, in four sets.

Harris reached his first ATP doubles final with German Tim Pütz. They lost in the final to Robin Haase and Matwé Middelkoop. Representing South Africa during the Davis Cup tie against Israel, Harris got his first singles win of the season by beating Daniel Cukierman in his first match. In the end, Israel won the tie over South Africa 3-1. In Miami, Harris upset Denis Shapovalov in the second round. He lost in the fourth round to Hubert Hurkacz. Nevertheless, this was his best result at a Masters 1000 event.

On 17 June 2022, Harris announced that he will be out for the rest of the season due to a right wrist injury that required surgery.

=== 2023 – 2024: Comeback, first ATP doubles title, return to top 100 ===
Using a protected ranking, Harris upset 17th seed Lorenzo Musetti in the first round of the Australian Open in five sets. Again using a protected ranking, Harris entered the 2023 French Open and lost to 22nd seed Alexander Zverev in straight sets. He won his first ATP title at the 2023 Mallorca Championships with Yuki Bhambri.

Also with protected ranking, Harris reached the second round at the 2023 US Open defeating Guido Pella.

Ranked No. 91, Harris qualified for the main draw at the 2024 Wimbledon Championships. After beating Alex Michelsen in a first round match, Harris lost to 14th seed Ben Shelton in a fifth set tie-breaker. Harris ended his season early following a severe lower back injury, requiring a discectomy surgery in October 2024.

=== 2025 – 2026: Comeback, first ATP doubles title, return to top 100 ===
Harris returned to the tour in February 2025 suffering multiple first round losses. Ranked No. 224, Harris qualified for the main draw at the 2025 French Open defeating Marin Čilić in the last round of qualifying. He lost to Andrey Rublev in the first round. Using a protected ranking, Harris received entry into the main draw of the 2025 Wimbledon Championships. He defeated Zizou Bergs in the first round, but lost to Rublev in the second round. Making it through qualifying at the 2025 US Open, Harris beat Sebastian Baez in the first round, but lost to fourth seed Taylor Fritz in the second round. Reaching the quarter-finals of both the 2025 Jingshan and 2025 Suzhou Challenger events, Harris ended his 2025 season with a year-end ATP ranking of 222.

Having lost in first round qualifying at the 2026 Australian Open, Harris won his first ATP Challenger title for the year at the Soma Bay Open in Egypt, winning after Jack Pinnington-Jones retired trailing 1-6, 2-5. Harris followed that up with another title at Tenerife 2 Challenger event in Spain, beating Alejandro Moro Canas in the final. Entering the 2026 French Open qualifiers with a ranking of 143, Harris lost in the second round of qualifying against Andrea Pellegrino. He took his third Challenger title in August 2026, by defeating Andre Ilagan at the Indiana Hardcourt Championships in Brownsburg, United States. The week after, he reached the semi-finals, losing to Baez, at the Cancun Country Open, coming through qualifying. Entering the 2026 US Open as a qualifier, Harris beat wild card Jack Kennedy in the first round, losing to Stefanos Tsitsipas in four sets in the second round. At the 2026 Chengdu Open, he reached the quarterfinal after defeating top seed and 19th ranked, Valentin Vacherot, where he lost to Hubert Hurkacz. He took his fourth Challenger title for the year at the Jingshan Open, defeating Mattia Bellucci in the final.

== Personal life ==
Lloyd Harris was born in Cape Town, South Africa and began playing tennis at age 3. He speaks English and Afrikaans.

During the last tournament that his parents could afford, he qualified for two futures and made quarterfinals of one, and semi finals of the other. From this success he received enough support to play five more weeks of futures around Africa. In early 2018, he was playing in Portugal when he received the news of his father dying the day before his match. He decided that he was going to stay and play for him and ended up winning back to back weeks.

== Coaching ==
Harris was coached by Norman McCarthy as a child, and in 2012, he joined the Anthony Harris Tennis Academy. He has been coached by Anthony Harris ever since. Xavier Malisse occasionally acts as his coach while on the tour.

== National representation ==
Harris has represented South Africa at the Davis Cup where he has a win–loss record of 11-4.

== Performance timeline ==
Key
| W | F | SF | QF | #R | RR | Q# | DNQ | A | NH |

(W) winner; (F) finalist; (SF) semifinalist; (QF) quarterfinalist; (#R) rounds 4, 3, 2, 1; (RR) round-robin stage; (Q#) qualification round; (DNQ) did not qualify; (A) absent; (NH) not held; (SR) strike rate (events won / competed); (W–L) win–loss record.
To avoid confusion and double counting, these charts are updated at the conclusion of a tournament or when the player's participation has ended.

| Tournament | 2016 | 2017 | 2018 | 2019 | 2020 | 2021 | 2022 | 2023 | 2024 | 2025 | 2026 | SR | W–L | Win % |
|---|---|---|---|---|---|---|---|---|---|---|---|---|---|---|
Grand Slam tournaments
| Australian Open | A | A | A | 1R | 1R | 3R | 1R | 2R | 1R | A | Q1 | 0 / 6 | 3–6 | 33% |
| French Open | A | A | Q1 | 2R | 2R | 2R | 1R | 1R | Q2 | 1R | Q2 | 0 / 6 | 3–6 | 33% |
| Wimbledon | A | A | Q1 | 1R | NH | 2R | A | 1R | 2R | 2R | A | 0 / 5 | 3–5 | 38% |
| US Open | A | A | 1R | 1R | 2R | QF | A | 2R | A | 2R | 2R | 0 / 7 | 8–7 | 53% |
| Win–loss | 0–0 | 0–0 | 0–1 | 1–4 | 2–3 | 8–4 | 0–2 | 2–4 | 1–2 | 2–3 | 1–1 | 0 / 24 | 17-24 | 41% |
National representation
| Summer Olympics | A | NH | | | | A | NH | | A | NH | | 0 / 0 | 0–0 | – |
| Davis Cup | Z2 | Z2 | Z1 | Z2 | Z1 | WG2 | | WG1 | A | A | A | 0 / 0 | 14–6 | 70% |
ATP Masters 1000
| Indian Wells Masters | A | A | A | Q1 | NH | 3R | 3R | Q1 | A | Q1 | A | 0 / 2 | 2–2 | 50% |
| Miami Open | A | A | A | 2R | NH | 2R | 4R | A | A | A | A | 0 / 3 | 4–2 | 50% |
| Monte-Carlo Masters | A | A | A | A | NH | A | 1R | A | A | A | A | 0 / 1 | 0–1 | 0% |
| Madrid Open | A | A | A | A | NH | 2R | 1R | A | A | Q1 | Q1 | 0 / 2 | 1–2 | 33% |
| Italian Open | A | A | A | A | Q1 | 1R | 1R | A | A | A | A | 0 / 3 | 0–3 | 0% |
| Canadian Open | A | Q1 | A | Q1 | NH | 3R | A | A | A | A | | 0 / 1 | 2–1 | 67% |
| Cincinnati Masters | A | A | A | Q1 | 1R | 2R | A | 1R | A | Q1 | | 0 / 3 | 1–3 | 25% |
| Shanghai Masters | A | A | A | A | NH | | | Q1 | A | A | | 0 / 0 | 0–0 | – |
| Paris Masters | A | A | A | A | A | A | A | A | A | A | | 0 / 0 | 0–0 | – |
| Win–loss | 0–0 | 0–0 | 0–0 | 0–1 | 0–1 | 6–5 | 4–5 | 1–1 | 0–0 | 0-0 | 0-0 | 0 / 12 | 10–13 | 43% |
Career statistics
| | 2016 | 2017 | 2018 | 2019 | 2020 | 2021 | 2022 | 2023 | 2024 | 2025 | 2026 | SR | W–L | Win % |
| Tournaments | 0 | 2 | 2 | 13 | 9 | 23 | 13 | 12 | 2 | 3 | | 79 | | |
| Titles | 0 | 0 | 0 | 0 | 0 | 0 | 0 | 0 | 0 | 0 | | 0 | | |
| Finals | 0 | 0 | 0 | 0 | 1 | 1 | 0 | 0 | 0 | 0 | | 2 | | |
| Overall win–loss | 2–2 | 6–2 | 2–4 | 10–13 | 12–12 | 30–22 | 7–14 | 7–12 | 1–2 | 2–3 | | 0 / 79 | 79–86 | 48% |
| Win % | 50% | 75% | 33% | 43% | 50% | 58% | 33% | 37% | 33% | 40% | – | 47.88% | | |
| Year-end ranking | 284 | 291 | 112 | 99 | 87 | 31 | 237 | 140 | 132 | 222 | | $4,602,746 | | |

== ATP Tour career finals ==
=== Singles: 2 (2 runner-ups) ===
| Legend (singles) Grand Slam tournaments (0–0) ATP Finals (0–0) ATP Tour Masters 1000 (0–0) ATP Tour 500 Series (0–1) ATP Tour 250 Series (0–1) | Finals by surface Hard (0–2) Clay (0–0) Grass (0–0) | Finals by setting Outdoor (0–2) Indoor (0–0) |

| Result | W–L | Date | Tournament | Tier | Surface | Opponent | Score |
|---|---|---|---|---|---|---|---|
| Loss | 0–1 | Jan 2020 | Adelaide International, Australia | 250 Series | Hard | (Russia) Andrey Rublev | 3–6, 0–6 |
| Loss | 0–2 | Mar 2021 | Dubai Tennis Championships, United Arab Emirates | 500 Series | Hard | (Russia) Aslan Karatsev | 3–6, 2–6 |

=== Doubles: 2 (1 title, 1 runner-up) ===
| Legend (doubles) Grand Slam tournaments (0–0) ATP Finals (0–0) ATP Tour Masters 1000 (0–0) ATP Tour 500 Series (0–1) ATP Tour 250 Series (1–0) | Finals by surface Hard (0–1) Clay (0–0) Grass (1–0) | Finals by setting Outdoor (1–0) Indoor (0–1) |

| Result | W–L | Date | Tournament | Tier | Surface | Partner | Opponent | Score |
|---|---|---|---|---|---|---|---|---|
| Loss | 0–1 | Feb 2022 | Rotterdam Open, Netherlands | 500 Series | Hard (i) | (Germany) Tim Pütz | (Netherlands) Robin Haase (Netherlands) Matwé Middelkoop | 6–4, 6–7^{(5–7)}, [5–10] |
| Win | 1–1 | Jun 2023 | Mallorca Championships, Spain | 250 Series | Grass | (India) Yuki Bhambri | (Netherlands) Robin Haase (Austria) Philipp Oswald | 6–3, 6–4 |

== ATP Challenger and ITF Tour finals ==
=== Singles: 30 (23 titles, 7 runner-ups) ===
| Legend (singles) ATP Challenger Tour (10–2) Futures/ITF World Tennis Tour (13–5) | Finals by surface Hard (22–6) Clay (0–1) Grass (1–0) |

| Result | W–L | Date | Tournament | Tier | Surface | Opponent | Score |
|---|---|---|---|---|---|---|---|
| Win | 1–0 | Jun 2015 | Mozambique F2, Maputo | Futures | Hard | (Australia) Jeremy Beale | 6–2, 6–1 |
| Win | 2–0 | Jun 2015 | Zimbabwe F2, Harare | Futures | Hard | (South Africa) Tucker Vorster | 6–1, 6–7^{(7–9)}, 6–3 |
| Win | 3–0 | Aug 2015 | Egypt F27, Sharm El Sheikh | Futures | Hard | (United Kingdom) Daniel Cox | 6–2, 6–2 |
| Loss | 3–1 | Nov 2015 | South Africa F2, Stellenbosch | Futures | Hard | (Austria) Lucas Miedler | 6–7^{(4–7)}, 1–6 |
| Win | 4–1 | Nov 2015 | South Africa F3, Stellenbosch | Futures | Hard | (Austria) Lucas Miedler | 6–2, 6–1 |
| Loss | 4–2 | Jun 2016 | Mozambique F1, Maputo | Futures | Hard | (Australia) Marc Polmans | 6–4, 2–6, 5–7 |
| Loss | 4–3 | Jul 2016 | Zimbabwe F2, Harare | Futures | Hard | (Australia) Marc Polmans | 2–6, 2–6 |
| Win | 5–3 | Oct 2016 | Egypt F27, Sharm El Sheikh | Futures | Hard | (Italy) Andrea Vavassori | 6–4, 6–2 |
| Win | 6–3 | Oct 2016 | Egypt F28, Sharm El Sheikh | Futures | Hard | (Spain) Pablo Vivero González | 6–3, 6–2 |
| Win | 7–3 | Oct 2016 | Egypt F29, Sharm El Sheikh | Futures | Hard | (Spain) Pablo Vivero González | 7–6^{(11–9)}, 4–6, 6–4 |
| Win | 8–3 | Nov 2016 | South Africa F1, Stellenbosch | Futures | Hard | (Italy) Alessandro Bega | 6–4, 6–4 |
| Win | 9–3 | Nov 2016 | South Africa F2, Stellenbosch | Futures | Hard | (Spain) Jordi Samper Montaña | 6–0, 6–1 |
| Win | 10–3 | Nov 2016 | South Africa F3, Stellenbosch | Futures | Hard | (South Africa) Nicolaas Scholtz | 7–5, 6–4 |
| Loss | 10–4 | Apr 2017 | Italy F10, Pula, Sardinia | Futures | Clay | (Sweden) Christian Lindell | 4–6, 1–6 |
| Loss | 10–5 | Feb 2018 | Egypt F6, Sharm El Sheikh | Futures | Hard | (Austria) Lucas Miedler | 3–6, 6–0, 2–6 |
| Win | 11–5 | Mar 2018 | Egypt F7, Sharm El Sheikh | Futures | Hard | (Bosnia and Herzegovina) Aldin Šetkić | 6–4, 4–6, 6–4 |
| Win | 12–5 | Mar 2018 | Portugal F5, Vilamoura | Futures | Hard | (Spain) Roberto Ortega Olmedo | 4–6, 6–1, 6–0 |
| Win | 13–5 | Mar 2018 | Portugal F6, Lisbon | Futures | Hard | (Portugal) Frederico Ferreira Silva | 7–6^{(7–2)}, 7–6^{(7–3)} |
| Win | 14–5 | Aug 2018 | Lexington, U.S. | Challenger | Hard | (Italy) Stefano Napolitano | 6–4, 6–3 |
| Loss | 14–6 | Aug 2018 | Aptos, U.S. | Challenger | Hard | (Australia) Thanasi Kokkinakis | 2–6, 3–6 |
| Win | 15–6 | Oct 2018 | Stockton, U.S. | Challenger | Hard | (Australia) Marc Polmans | 6–2, 6–2 |
| Win | 16–6 | Feb 2019 | Launceston, Australia | Challenger | Hard | (Italy) Lorenzo Giustino | 6–2, 6–2 |
| Loss | 16–7 | Jan 2023 | Nonthaburi, Thailand | Challenger | Hard | (France) Arthur Cazaux | 6–7^{(5–7)}, 2–6 |
| Win | 17–7 | Apr 2024 | Gwangju, South Korea | Challenger | Hard | (China) Bu Yunchaokete | 6–2, 3–6, 6–4 |
| Win | 18–7 | Apr 2024 | Shenzhen, China | Challenger | Hard | (Australia) James Duckworth | 6–3, 6–3 |
| Win | 19–7 | Jun 2024 | Surbiton, United Kingdom | Challenger | Grass | (Switzerland) Leandro Riedi | 7–6^{(10–8)}, 7–5 |
| Win | 20–7 | Jan 2026 | Soma Bay, Egypt | Challenger | Hard | (United Kingdom) Jack Pinnington Jones | 6–1, 5–2 ret. |
| Win | 21–7 | Feb 2026 | Tenerife, Spain | Challenger | Hard | (Spain) Alejandro Moro Cañas | 7–5, 7–5 |
| Win | 22–7 | Aug 2026 | Brownsburg, U.S. | Challenger | Hard | (United States) Andre Ilagan | 6-2, 7–6^{(8–6)} |
| Win | 23–7 | Oct 2026 | Jingshan, China | Challenger | Hard | (Italy) Mattia Bellucci | 1-6, 6-3, 7–6^{(7–4)} |

=== Doubles: 9 (6 titles, 3 runner-ups) ===
| Legend (doubles) ATP Challenger Tour (2–0) Futures/ITF World Tennis Tour (4–3) | Finals by surface Hard (5–3) Clay (1–0) Grass (0–0) Carpet (0–0) |

| Result | W–L | Date | Tournament | Tier | Surface | Partner | Opponents | Score |
|---|---|---|---|---|---|---|---|---|
| Win | 1–0 | Jun 2015 | Zimbabwe F1, Harare | Futures | Hard | (South Africa) Nicolaas Scholtz | (United States) Evan King (United States) Anderson Reed | 7–5, 6–4 |
| Win | 2–0 | Aug 2015 | Egypt F27, Sharm El Sheikh | Futures | Hard | (United States) Cameron Silverman | (Sweden) Milos Sekulic (Czech Republic) Libor Salaba | 7–6^{(7–4)}, 6–2 |
| Loss | 2–1 | Dec 2015 | Nigeria F3, Lagos | Futures | Hard | (Egypt) Karim-Mohamed Maamoun | (Netherlands) David Pel (Netherlands) Antal van der Duim | 3–6, 2–6 |
| Win | 3–1 | Dec 2015 | Nigeria F4, Lagos | Futures | Hard | (Egypt) Karim-Mohamed Maamoun | (Netherlands) David Pel (Netherlands) Antal van der Duim | 7–5, 7–6^{(8–6)} |
| Win | 4–1 | Oct 2016 | Egypt F29, Sharm El Sheikh | Futures | Hard | (Egypt) Issam Haitham Taweel | (United States) Conor Berg (United States) Mitchell Thomas McDaniels | 6–1, 6–3 |
| Loss | 4–2 | Mar 2017 | Egypt F9, Sharm El Sheikh | Futures | Hard | (South Africa) Nicolaas Scholtz | (Ukraine) Denys Molchanov (Ukraine) Artem Smirnov | w/o |
| Loss | 4–3 | Mar 2018 | Portugal F5, Vilamoura | Futures | Hard | (Portugal) Fred Gil | (Portugal) Francisco Cabral (Portugal) Tiago Cação | 3–6, 2–6 |
| Win | 5–3 | Apr 2018 | Anning, China | Challenger | Clay | (Belarus) Aliaksandr Bury | (China) Gong Maoxin (China) Zhang Ze | 6–3, 6–4 |
| Win | 6–3 | Jan 2019 | Burnie, Australia | Challenger | Hard | (Israel) Dudi Sela | (Bosnia and Herzegovina) Mirza Bašić (Bosnia and Herzegovina) Tomislav Brkić | 6–3, 6–7^{(3–7)}, [10–8] |

== Wins over top 10 players ==
- He has a 3–12 record against players who were, at the time the match was played, ranked in the top 10.

| Season | 2021 | 2022 | 2023 | 2024 | Total |
|---|---|---|---|---|---|
| Wins | 3 | 0 | 0 | 0 | 3 |

| # | Player | Rank | Event | Surface | Rd | Score | LHR |
|---|---|---|---|---|---|---|---|
2021
| 1. | (Austria) Dominic Thiem | 4 | Dubai Championships, UAE | Hard | 2R | 6–3, 6–4 | 81 |
| 2. | (Spain) Rafael Nadal | 3 | Washington Open, United States | Hard | 3R | 6–4, 1–6, 6–4 | 50 |
| 3. | (Canada) Denis Shapovalov | 10 | US Open, United States | Hard | 3R | 6–4, 6–4, 6–4 | 46 |

* As of 13 January 2024
