= 2025 Challenger Ciudad de Guayaquil – Doubles =

Doubles
- 2025 Challenger Ciudad de Guayaquil

Final
- Champions: (Mexico) Alex Hernández (Mexico) Rodrigo Pacheco Méndez
- Runners-up: (Argentina) Lucio Ratti (Brazil) Victor Hugo Remondy Pagotto
- Score: 7–5, 6–3

Events
| Singles | Doubles |
- Challenger Ciudad de Guayaquil

Karol Drzewiecki and Piotr Matuszewski were the defending champions but lost in the first round to Lucio Ratti and Victor Hugo Remondy Pagotto.

Alex Hernández and Rodrigo Pacheco Méndez won the title after defeating Ratti and Remondy Pagotto 7–5, 6–3 in the final.

== Seeds ==
1. (Colombia) Nicolás Barrientos / (Ecuador) Diego Hidalgo (quarterfinals)
2. (Venezuela) Luis David Martínez / (Mexico) Miguel Ángel Reyes-Varela (semifinals)
3. (Poland) Karol Drzewiecki / (Poland) Piotr Matuszewski (first round)
4. (Uruguay) Ignacio Carou / (Bolivia) Murkel Dellien (first round)

== Draw ==
Key

- Q = Qualifier
- WC = Wild card
- LL = Lucky loser
- Alt = Alternate
- ITF = ITF entry
- PR = Protected ranking
- SR = Special ranking
- SE = Special exempt
- JE = Junior exempt
- JR = Junior Accelerator Programme entrant
- CO = College Accelerator Programme entrant
- NG = Next Gen Accelerator Program entrant
- w/o = Walkover
- r = Retired
- d = Defaulted

First round
1 | (Colombia) N Barrientos (Ecuador) D Hidalgo | 6 | 6
(United States) Ryan Dickerson (Romania) Sebastian Gima | 2 | 3
(Argentina) F Mena (Uruguay) F Roncadelli | 6 | 6
WC | (Ecuador) Francisco Castro (Ecuador) Mario André Galarraga | 3 | 2
3 | (Poland) K Drzewiecki (Poland) P Matuszewski | 5 | 3
(Argentina) Lucio Ratti (Brazil) Victor Hugo Remondy Pagotto | 7 | 6
(Argentina) H Casanova (Peru) A Huertas del Pino | 6 | 6^{2} | [8]
(Spain) D Jordà Sanchis (Brazil) PA Saraiva dos Santos | 2 | 7^{7} | [10]
Alt | (Argentina) Nicolás García Longo (Argentina) Lorenzo Joaquín Rodríguez | 3 | 6 | [7]
(Mexico) A Hernández (Mexico) R Pacheco Méndez | 6 | 3 | [10]
(Uruguay) Federico Aguilar Cardozo (Uruguay) J Aguilar Cardozo | 7^{7} | 6
4 | (Uruguay) I Carou (Bolivia) M Dellien | 6^{5} | 3
(Argentina) LE Ambrogi (Argentina) Tomás Martínez | 5 | 6^{3}
WC | (Ecuador) Emilio Camacho (Ecuador) E Gómez | 7 | 7^{7}
Alt | (Ecuador) P Alvarado (Argentina) Tobías Sonne | 1 | 0
2 | (Venezuela) LD Martínez (Mexico) M Reyes-Varela | 6 | 6

Quarterfinals
1 | (Colombia) N Barrientos (Ecuador) D Hidalgo | 4 | 6^{2}
(Argentina) F Mena (Uruguay) F Roncadelli | 6 | 7^{7}
(Argentina) L Ratti (Brazil) VH Remondy Pagotto | 2 | 6 | [10]
(Spain) D Jordà Sanchis (Brazil) PA Saraiva dos Santos | 6 | 4 | [6]
(Mexico) A Hernández (Mexico) R Pacheco Méndez | 6 | 7
(Uruguay) F Aguilar Cardozo (Uruguay) J Aguilar Cardozo | 3 | 5
WC | (Ecuador) E Camacho (Ecuador) E Gómez | 4 | 4
2 | (Venezuela) LD Martínez (Mexico) M Reyes-Varela | 6 | 6

Semifinals
(Argentina) F Mena (Uruguay) F Roncadelli | 7^{11} | 4 | [5]
(Argentina) L Ratti (Brazil) VH Remondy Pagotto | 6^{9} | 6 | [10]
(Mexico) A Hernández (Mexico) R Pacheco Méndez | 3 | 7^{7} | [10]
2 | (Venezuela) LD Martínez (Mexico) M Reyes-Varela | 6 | 6^{4} | [6]

Final
(Argentina) L Ratti (Brazil) VH Remondy Pagotto | 5 | 3
(Mexico) A Hernández (Mexico) R Pacheco Méndez | 7 | 6
