= 2025 Challenger Ciudad de Guayaquil =

- Date: 17 – 23 November
- Edition: 21st
- Surface: Clay
- Location: Guayaquil, Ecuador

Champions

Singles
- (Paraguay) Daniel Vallejo

Doubles
- (Mexico) Alex Hernández / (Mexico) Rodrigo Pacheco Méndez
- Challenger Ciudad de Guayaquil

The 2025 Challenger de Guayaquil Copa Banco Guayaquil was a professional tennis tournament played on clay courts. It was the 21st edition of the tournament which was part of the 2025 ATP Challenger Tour. It took place in Guayaquil, Ecuador between 17 and 23 November 2025.

== Singles main-draw entrants ==
=== Seeds ===
Country	Player	Rank^{1}	Seed
~~CHI~~	~~Tomás Barrios Vera~~	~~111~~	~~1~~
PAR	Daniel Vallejo	169	2
LBN	Hady Habib	173	3
ECU	Álvaro Guillén Meza	200	4
PER	Gonzalo Bueno	206	5
MEX	Rodrigo Pacheco Méndez	209	6
BOL	Murkel Dellien	262	7
ARG	Federico Agustín Gómez	270	8
ECU	Andrés Andrade	283	9

- ^{1} Rankings are as of 10 November 2025.

=== Other entrants ===
The following players received wildcards into the singles main draw:

- (Ecuador) Emilio Camacho
- (Ecuador) Mario André Galarraga
- (Ecuador) Lucas Yúnez

The following players received entry into the singles main draw as alternates:

- (Uruguay) Joaquín Aguilar Cardozo
- (United States) Ryan Dickerson
- (Argentina) Juan Estévez

The following players received entry from the qualifying draw:

- (Uruguay) Federico Aguilar Cardozo
- (Peru) Arklon Huertas del Pino
- (Venezuela) Luis David Martínez
- (Argentina) Tomás Martínez
- (Colombia) Salvador Price
- (Argentina) Lucio Ratti

The following player received entry as a lucky loser:

- (Canada) Juan Carlos Aguilar

== Champions ==
=== Singles ===
- (Paraguay) Daniel Vallejo def. (Peru) Juan Pablo Varillas 7–5, 6–7^{(7–9)}, 6–3.

=== Doubles ===
- (Mexico) Alex Hernández / (Mexico) Rodrigo Pacheco Méndez def. (Argentina) Lucio Ratti / (Brazil) Victor Hugo Remondy Pagotto 7–5, 6–3.
