= Soma Bay Open =

- 2026 Soma Bay Open

ATP Challenger Tour
- Location: Soma Bay, Egypt
- Venue: S Tennis Academy
- Category: ATP Challenger Tour
- Surface: Hard
- Prize money: $60,000

The Soma Bay Open is a professional tennis tournament played on hardcourts. It is currently part of the ATP Challenger Tour. It was first held in Soma Bay, Egypt in 2025.

== Past finals ==
=== Singles ===
Year	Champion	Runner-up	Score
2026 (1)	(South Africa) Lloyd Harris	(United Kingdom) Jack Pinnington Jones	6–1, 5–2 ret.
2025	(United Kingdom) Toby Samuel	(United Kingdom) Jay Clarke	4–6, 7–6^{(7–4)}, 6–0

=== Doubles ===
Year	Champions	Runners-up	Score
2026 (1)	(Sweden) Erik Grevelius (Sweden) Adam Heinonen	(Mexico) Alex Hernández (Mexico) Rodrigo Pacheco Méndez	6–2, 6–3
2025	Sergey Betov; Daniil Ostapenkov	(Egypt) Michael Bassem Sobhy (Egypt) Fares Zakaria	6–4, 6–2
