= Alex Hernández (tennis) =

Mexican tennis player (born 1999)

- Full name: Juan Alejandro Hernández Serrano
- Country (sports): Mexico
- Born: 23 June 1999 (age 27) Acapulco, Mexico
- Height: 1.75 m (5 ft 9 in)
- Turned pro: 2017
- Plays: Right-handed (two-handed backhand)
- Prize money: US $207,933

Singles
- Career record: 2–5
- Career titles: 0
- Highest ranking: No. 409 (12 January 2026)
- Current ranking: No. 463 (9 November 2026)

Doubles
- Career record: 0–2
- Career titles: 0
- Highest ranking: No. 297 (21 September 2026)
- Current ranking: No. 314 (9 November 2026)
- Last updated on: 9 November 2026.

Juan Alejandro Hernández Serrano (more commonly known as Alex Hernández (born 23 June 1999) is a Mexican professional tennis player. He has a career-high ATP singles ranking of No. 409 achieved on 12 January 2026 and a doubles ranking of No. 297 achieved on 21 September 2026. He is currently the No. 2 singles player from Mexico.

== Career ==
=== 2022-2024: ATP debut and first wins, top 500 ===
Hernández made his ATP main draw debut at the 2022 Abierto Mexicano Telcel after receiving a wildcard into the singles main draw. He lost to Pablo Andújar after winning only one game. At the 2022 Los Cabos Open he won his first round match against lucky loser Colombian Nicolás Barrientos becoming the first Mexican in the singles history of the tournament to win a match in the main draw. Hernández played second seed Félix Auger-Aliassime in the next round and lost in straight sets. As a result, he moved more than 50 positions up in the rankings into the top 500 and the following week reached a new career-high ranking of No. 462 on 15 August 2022.

He received a qualifying wildcard for the Challenger 125, the 2023 Mexico City Open but lost in the first qualifying round to Evan Zhu and for the 2024 edition and this time advanced to the main draw after qualifying.

=== 2025-2026: Top 350 in doubles ===
Hernández also received a wildcard for the new Challenger 125 tournament in Mexico, the 2025 Morelia Open and defeated Colombian Nicolás Mejía in the first round and eight seed Juan Pablo Ficovich in the second recording his biggest win of his career thus far, to reach his first Challenger quarterfinal.

Ranked No. 493 at the 2025 Los Cabos Open as a wildcard entry, Hernández recorded his second and biggest career ATP win over world No. 155 Daniel Taro, after he trailed 3–6, 2–5, and reached a new career ranking of world No. 431 on 21 July 2025. Ranked No. 499, Hernández again qualified for the 2026 Los Cabos Open defeating compatriot Alan Magadan.

== ATP Challenger Tour finals ==
=== Doubles: 2 (1 title, 1 runner-up) ===
Legend ATP Challenger Tour (1–1)

Result	W–L	Date	Tournament	Tier	Surface	Partner	Opponents	Score
Win	1–0	Nov 2025	Challenger de Guayaquil, Ecuador	Challenger	Clay	(Mexico) Rodrigo Pacheco Méndez	(Argentina) Lucio Ratti (Brazil) Victor Hugo Remondy Pagotto	7–5, 6–3
Loss	1–1	Jan 2026	Soma Bay Open, Egypt	Challenger	Hard	(Mexico) Rodrigo Pacheco Méndez	(Sweden) Erik Grevelius (Sweden) Adam Heinonen	2–6, 3–6

== ITF World Tennis Tour finals ==
=== Singles: 3 (3 runner-ups) ===
Legend ITF WTT (0–3)

Result	W–L	Date	Tournament	Tier	Surface	Opponent	Score
Loss	0–1	Jul 2024	M15 Huamantla, Mexico	WTT	Hard	(United States) Eric Hadigian	3–6, 2–6
Loss	0–2	Mar 2025	M15 Huamantla, Mexico	WTT	Hard	(United States) Garrett Johns	6–4, 0–6, 6–7^{(5–7)}
Loss	0–3	May 2025	M15 Villahermosa, Mexico	WTT	Hard	(Canada) Dan Martin	7–5, 2–6, 3–6

=== Doubles: 5 (5 runner-ups) ===
Legend ITF WTT (0–5)	Finals by surface Hard (0–4) Clay (0–1)

Result	W–L	Date	Tournament	Tier	Surface	Partner	Opponents	Score
Loss	0–1	Dec 2019	M15 Cancún, Mexico	WTT	Hard	(Mexico) Mauricio Astorga	(Brazil) Fernando Yamacita (Brazil) Eduardo Ribeiro	4–6, 4–6
Loss	0–2	Jul 2022	M15 Cancún, Mexico	WTT	Hard	(Mexico) Alan Fernando Rubio Fierros	(United States) Trey Hilderbrand (United States) Noah Schachter	5–7, 1–6
Loss	0–3	May 2024	M15 Villahermosa, Mexico	WTT	Hard	(Mexico) Rodrigo Pacheco Méndez	(United States) Noah Schachter (Antigua and Barbuda) Herbert Jody Maginley	4–6, 4–6
Loss	0–4	Jan 2025	M15 Antalya, Turkiye	WTT	Clay	(Mexico) Rodrigo Pacheco Méndez	(Turkey) Gökberk Sarıtaş (Turkey) Mert Naci Türker	6–3, 6–7^{(4–7)}, [10–12]
Loss	0–5	Jun 2025	M25 Santo Domingo, Dominican Republic	WTT	Hard	(Mexico) Luis Carlos Álvarez	(Brazil) Lucca Pignaton (Brazil) Lucas Andrade da Silva	4–6, 4–6
