= Sergey Betov =

Belarusian tennis player

Sergey Betov Сяргей Бетаў
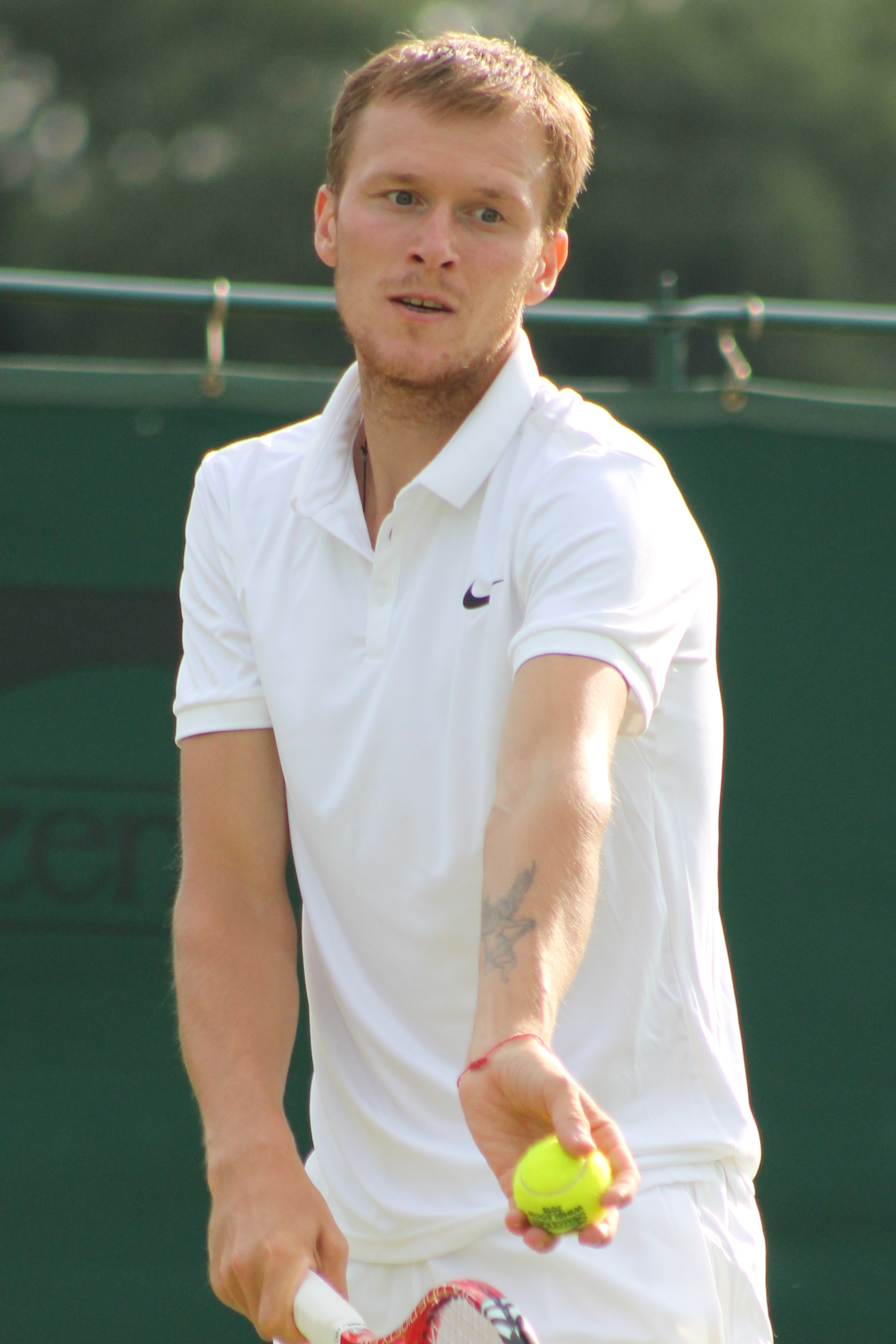
- Country (sports): Belarus
- Residence: Minsk, Belarus
- Born: 15 October 1987 (age 39) Gomel, Belarusian SSR, Soviet Union
- Height: 1.85 m (6 ft 1 in)
- Plays: Right-handed
- Prize money: US $248,346

Singles
- Career record: 1–7 (at ATP Tour level, Grand Slam level, and in Davis Cup)
- Career titles: 0
- Highest ranking: No. 340 (1 August 2011)
- Current ranking: No. 1,780 (19 October 2026)

Doubles
- Career record: 10–18 (at ATP Tour level, Grand Slam level, and in Davis Cup)
- Career titles: 15 Challenger
- Highest ranking: No. 61 (26 October 2015)
- Current ranking: No. 250 (19 October 2026)

Grand Slam doubles results
- Australian Open: 1R (2016)
- Wimbledon: 2R (2015)
- US Open: 1R (2015)

Team competitions
- Davis Cup: 3–8
- Last updated on: 19 October 2026.

Sergey Aleksandrovich Betov (Belarusian: Сяргей Аляксандравіч Бетаў Siarhiej Aliaksandravich Betaŭ; Russian: Сергей Александрович Бетов Sergey Aleksandrovich Betov; born 15 October 1987) is a Belarusian professional tennis player. He reached his highest ATP singles ranking of world No. 340 on 1 August 2011 and his highest doubles ranking of No. 61 was achieved on 26 October 2015.

On April 29, 2016, the International Tennis Federation found that Betov had committed an Anti-Doping Rule Violation in connection with the consumption of meldonium, but further determined that he bore no fault or negligence for the violation and therefore permitted him to resume competition.

He married Russian tennis player Margarita Gasparyan in July 2021; they announced their pregnancy in February 2022.

== ATP Challenger Tour Finals ==
=== Singles: 1 (0 title, 1 runner-ups) ===
Legend ATP Challenger Tour (0–1)	Finals by surface Hard (0–1)

Result	No.	Date	Tournament	Surface	Opponent	Score
Runner-up	13.	12 May 2018	Karshi Challenger, Uzbekistan	Hard (O)	(Belarus) Egor Gerasimov	6–7(3), 0–2 RET

=== Doubles: 19 (15 title, 4 runner-ups) ===
Legend ATP Challenger Tour (15–4)	Finals by surface Hard (1–4)

Result	No.	Date	Tournament	Surface	Partner	Opponent	Score
Winner	1.	24 November 2013	Siberia Cup, Russia	Hard (I)	(Belarus) Aliaksandr Bury	(Ukraine) Ivan Anikanov (Croatia) Ante Pavić	6–4, 6–2
Winner	2.	23 February 2014	Astana Challenger, Kazakhstan	Hard (I)	(Belarus) Aliaksandr Bury	(Kazakhstan) Andrey Golubev (Kazakhstan) Evgeny Korolev	6–1, 6–4
Winner	3.	17 May 2014	Samarkand Challenger, Uzbekistan	Clay (O)	(Belarus) Aliaksandr Bury	(Uzbekistan) Shonigmatjon Shofayziyev (Uzbekistan) Vaja Uzakov	6–4, 6–3
Winner	4.	24 May 2014	Karshi Challenger, Uzbekistan	Hard (O)	(Belarus) Aliaksandr Bury	(China) Mao-Xin Gong (Chinese Taipei) Hsien-Yin Peng	7–5, 1–6, [10–6]
Winner	5.	15 June 2014	Fergana Challenger, Uzbekistan	Hard (O)	(Belarus) Aliaksandr Bury	(Colombia) Nicolás Barrientos (Russia) Stanislav Vovk	6–7(6), 7–6(1), [10–3]
Winner	6.	13 July 2014	Tilia Slovenia Open, Slovenia	Hard (O)	(Belarus) Aliaksandr Bury	(Serbia) Ilija Bozoljac (Italy) Flavio Cipolla	6–0, 6–3
Winner	7.	9 November 2014	Sparkassen ATP Challenger, Italy	Hard (I)	(Belarus) Aliaksandr Bury	(Republic of Ireland) James Cluskey (United States) Austin Krajicek	6–4, 5–7, [10–6]
Runner-up	8.	26 April 2015	Città di Vercelli – Trofeo Multimed, Italy	Clay (O)	(Russia) Mikhail Elgin	(Italy) Andrea Arnaboldi (Chile) Hans Podlipnik Castillo	7–6(5), 5–7, [3–10]
Runner-up	9.	9 May 2015	Karshi Challenger, Uzbekistan	Hard (O)	(Russia) Mikhail Elgin	(India) Yuki Bhambri (Spain) Adrián Menéndez Maceiras	7–5, 3–6, [8–10]
Winner	10.	16 May 2015	Samarkand Challenger, Uzbekistan	Clay (O)	(Russia) Mikhail Elgin	(Serbia) Laslo Djere (Serbia) Peđa Krstin	6–4, 6–3
Winner	11.	21 May 2015	Eskişehir Cup, Turkey	Hard (O)	(Russia) Mikhail Elgin	(Chinese Taipei) Ti Chen (South Africa) Ruan Roelofse	6–4, 6–7(2), [10–7]
Winner	12.	21 June 2015	Fergana Challenger, Uzbekistan	Hard (O)	(Russia) Mikhail Elgin	(Ukraine) Denys Molchanov (Croatia) Franko Škugor	6–3, 7–5
Winner	13.	11 July 2015	Sparkassen Open, Germany	Clay (O)	(Russia) Mikhail Elgin	(Bosnia and Herzegovina) Damir Džumhur (Croatia) Franko Škugor	3–6, 6–1, [10–5]
Runner-up	14.	16 August 2015	Advantage Cars Prague Open, Czech Republic	Clay (O)	(Russia) Mikhail Elgin	(Netherlands) Wesley Koolhof (Netherlands) Matwé Middelkoop	4–6, 6–3, [7–10]
Winner	15.	17 October 2015	Tashkent Challenger, Uzbekistan	Hard (O)	(Russia) Mikhail Elgin	(Germany) Andre Begemann (New Zealand) Artem Sitak	6–4, 6–4
Winner	16.	13 August 2016	Tilia Slovenia Open, Slovenia	Hard (O)	(Belarus) Ilya Ivashka	(Croatia) Tomislav Draganja (Croatia) Nino Serdarušić	1–6, 6–3, [10–4]
Winner	17.	23 November 2025	Soma Bay Open, Egypt	Hard	Daniil Ostapenkov	(Egypt) Michael Bassem Sobhy (Egypt) Fares Zakaria	6–4, 6–2
Winner	18.	12 July 2026	Ethias Province Open, Belgium	Clay	(Chinese Taipei) Jeffrey Hsu	(Belgium) Émilien Demanet (Belgium) Niels Ratiu	7–6^{(7–3)}, 5–7, [13–11]
Runner-up	19.	8 August 2026	ENKA Open Challenger, Turkey	Hard	Ilia Simakin	(Turkey) Arda Azkara (United Kingdom) James MacKinlay	3–6, 1–6

== ITF finals 67 (34-33) ==
=== Singles 13 (5-8) ===
Legend Futures	Finals by surface Hard (4–5) Clay (1–2) Grass (0–0) Carpet (0–1)

Result	No.	Date	Tournament	Surface	Opponent	Score
Runner-up	1.	21 June 2008	Belarus F2 Futures	Hard (O)	(Australia) Brydan Klein	6–7(5), 1–6
Runner-up	2.	16 October 2009	Belarus F1 Futures	Carpet (I)	(Poland) Michał Przysiężny	2–6, 3–6
Runner-up	3.	21 February 2010	Azerbaijan F1 Futures	Hard (I)	(Sweden) Ervin Eleskovic	3–6, 2–6
Runner-up	4.	21 August 2010	Belarus F2 Futures	Clay (O)	(Spain) Guillermo Olaso	1–6, 6–7(5)
Winner	5.	5 September 2010	Poland F7 Futures	Clay (O)	(Poland) Grzegorz Panfil	7–5, 3–6, 6–3
Winner	6.	23 October 2010	Belarus F4 Futures	Hard (I)	(Poland) Jerzy Janowicz	4–6, 7–6(6), 7–6(3)
Runner-up	7.	20 March 2011	Russia F1 Futures	Hard (I)	(Russia) Denis Matsukevich	5–7, 2–6
Winner	8.	28 January 2012	Russia F3 Futures	Hard (I)	(Ukraine) Stanislav Poplavskyy	6–2, 6–4
Runner-up	9.	14 April 2012	Kazakhstan F3 Futures	Hard (O)	(Kazakhstan) Alexey Kedryuk	2–6, 6–7(6)
Runner-up	10.	30 March 2013	Russia F4 Futures	Hard (I)	(Russia) Konstantin Kravchuk	4–6, 1–6
Runner-up	11.	4 May 2013	Kazakhstan F3 Futures	Clay (O)	(Serbia) Peđa Krstin	2–6, 1–6
Winner	12.	30 January 2016	Kazakhstan F2 Futures	Hard (I)	(Russia) Markos Kalovelonis	6–3, 6–4
Winner	13.	18 August 2018	Belarus F2 Futures	Hard (O)	(Czech Republic) David Poljak	7–5, 1–6, 6–0

=== Doubles 54 (29-25) ===
Legend Futures	Finals by surface Hard (34–18) Clay (8–9) Grass (0–0) Carpet (2–2)

Result	No.	Date	Tournament	Surface	Partner	Opponent	Score
Winner	1.	15 April 2007	Russia F1 Futures	Hard (I)	(Belarus) Vladimir Voltchkov	(Russia) Evgeny Kirillov (Russia) Konstantin Kravchuk	7–6(5), 6–3
Winner	2.	19 May 2007	Belarus F1 Futures	Hard (O)	(Belarus) Vladimir Voltchkov	(Croatia) Ivan Cerović (Russia) Artem Sitak	6–4, 5–7, 6–3
Runner-up	3.	4 June 2007	Ukraine F1 Futures	Clay (O)	(Ukraine) Vladyslav Klymenko	(Moldova) Andrei Gorban (Ukraine) Denys Molchanov	7–5, 3–6, 2–6
Runner-up	4.	14 July 2007	Iran F1 Futures	Clay (O)	(Kazakhstan) Syrym Abdukhalikov	(India) Rohan Gajjar (India) Aditya Madkekar	6–7(2), 7–6(2), 5–7
Runner-up	5.	20 July 2007	Iran F2 Futures	Clay (O)	(Kazakhstan) Syrym Abdukhalikov	(France) Clément Morel (France) Charles Roche	3–6, 6–3, 3–6
Runner-up	6.	29 July 2007	Georgia F1 Futures	Hard (O)	(Russia) Mikhail Elgin	(Czech Republic) Jiří Krkoška (Czech Republic) Daniel Lustig	6–7(2), 4–6
Winner	7.	3 August 2007	Georgia F2 Futures	Hard (O)	(Kazakhstan) Syrym Abdukhalikov	(France) Clément Morel (France) Charles Roche	2–0 RET
Winner	8.	2 September 2007	Bulgaria F6 Futures	Clay (O)	(Bulgaria) Vasko Mladenov	(Croatia) Roman Kelecic (Croatia) Nikola Martinovic	3-0 RET
Winner	9.	3 November 2007	Tunisia F6 Futures	Hard (O)	(Poland) Adam Chadaj	(Czech Republic) Roman Jebavý (Czech Republic) Filip Zeman	6–0, 6–3
Runner-up	10.	1 December 2007	Israel F5 Futures	Hard (O)	(Ukraine) Denys Molchanov	(Israel) Amir Hadad (Israel) Harel Levy	7–6(7), 4–6, [3–10]
Winner	11.	9 March 2008	USA F6 Futures	Hard (O)	(Lithuania) Ričardas Berankis	(United States) Adam El Mihdawy (Belarus) Uladzimir Ignatik	6–3, 6–3
Winner	12.	9 August 2008	Belarus F3 Futures	Clay (O)	(Belarus) Dzmitry Zhyrmont	(Ukraine) Vladyslav Klymenko (Latvia) Deniss Pavlovs	6–3, 5–7, [10–6]
Runner-up	13.	7 November 2008	Malaysia F1 Futures	Hard (O)	(Belarus) Andrei Karatchenia	(Indonesia) Christopher Rungkat (United States) Nathan Thompson	3–6, 4–6
Runner-up	14.	8 February 2009	Israel F3 Futures	Hard (O)	(Belarus) Dzmitry Zhyrmont	(Israel) Idan Mark (Israel) Saar Steele	6–7(5), 6–7(4)
Runner-up	15.	9 August 2009	Lithuania F1 Futures	Clay (O)	(Belarus) Dzmitry Zhyrmont	(France) Grégoire Burquier (France) Thomas Cazes-Carrère	3–6, 4–6
Runner-up	16.	13 September 2009	Russia F8 Futures	Hard (O)	(Ukraine) Aleksandr Agafonov	(Russia) Mikhail Fufygin (Russia) Vitali Reshetnikov	6–7(6), 6–3, [8–10]
Winner	17.	16 October 2009	Belarus F1 Futures	Carpet (I)	(Belarus) Nikolai Fidirko	(Poland) Dawid Olejniczak (Poland) Michał Przysiężny	7–6(3), 7–6(3)
Winner	18.	23 October 2009	Belarus F2 Futures	Hard (I)	(Belarus) Nikolai Fidirko	(Belarus) Aliaksandr Bury (Belarus) Andrei Vasilevski	6–3, 6–3
Winner	19.	21 November 2009	Malaysia F4 Futures	Hard (O)	(Belarus) Dzmitry Zhyrmont	(Thailand) Kirati Siributwong (United States) Nathan Thompson	6–2, 7–6(2)
Winner	20.	28 November 2009	Malaysia F5 Futures	Hard (O)	(Belarus) Dzmitry Zhyrmont	(India) Rohan Gajjar (Republic of Ireland) Colin O'Brien	6–4, 6–3
Runner-up	21.	5 December 2009	Malaysia F6 Futures	Hard (O)	(Belarus) Dzmitry Zhyrmont	(Netherlands) Jesse Huta Galung (Netherlands) Miliaan Niesten	2–6, 6–4, [6–10]
Runner-up	22.	5 June 2010	Poland F3 Futures	Clay (O)	(Hungary) Robert Varga	(Poland) Błażej Koniusz (Poland) Grzegorz Panfil	6–7(3), 3–6
Winner	23.	27 June 2010	Germany F6 Futures	Clay (O)	(Russia) Andrey Kumantsov	(Hungary) Ádám Kellner (Hungary) Zoltán Nagy	6–3, 6–3
Runner-up	24.	8 October 2010	Kazakhstan F4 Futures	Hard (I)	(Kazakhstan) Alexey Kedryuk	(Russia) Mikhail Elgin (Belarus) Andrei Vasilevski	7–5, 4–6, [4–10]
Winner	25.	16 October 2010	Belarus F3 Futures	Hard (I)	(Belarus) Dzmitry Zhyrmont	(Belarus) Aliaksandr Bury (Belarus) Nikolai Fidirko	7–6(2), 3–6, [10–7]
Winner	26.	23 October 2010	Belarus F4 Futures	Hard (I)	(Belarus) Dzmitry Zhyrmont	(Russia) Vitali Reshetnikov (Belarus) Andrei Vasilevski	6–3, 6–3
Winner	27.	13 February 2011	Turkey F4 Futures	Hard (O)	(Ukraine) Denys Molchanov	(Czech Republic) Michal Konecny (South Africa) Ruan Roelofse	6–4, 6–1
Runner-up	28.	3 July 2011	Germany F7 Futures	Clay (O)	(Belarus) Aliaksandr Bury	(Germany) Bastian Knittel (Germany) Alexander Satschko	6–7(3), 3–6
Runner-up	29.	20 November 2011	Czech Republic F4 Futures	Carpet (I)	(Belarus) Aliaksandr Bury	(Czech Republic) Roman Jebavý (Czech Republic) Jan Šátral	4–6, 3–6
Winner	30.	27 November 2011	Czech Republic F5 Futures	Carpet (I)	(Belarus) Aliaksandr Bury	(Czech Republic) Michal Konecny (Ukraine) Leonard Stakhovsky	7–6(4), 6–2
Winner	31.	20 January 2012	Russia F2 Futures	Hard (I)	(Belarus) Aliaksandr Bury	(Latvia) Andis Juška (Latvia) Deniss Pavlovs	6–1, 6–3
Runner-up	32.	25 February 2012	Russia F5 Futures	Hard (I)	(Russia) Denis Matsukevich	(Latvia) Andis Juška (Latvia) Deniss Pavlovs	4–6, 6–7(3)
Runner-up	33.	18 March 2012	Russia F6 Futures	Carpet (I)	(Belarus) Andrei Vasilevski	(Latvia) Andis Juška (Latvia) Deniss Pavlovs	6–7(5), 1–6
Runner-up	34.	7 April 2012	Kazakhstan F2 Futures	Hard (I)	(Belarus) Andrei Vasilevski	(Russia) Mikhail Fufygin (Russia) Andrei Levine	7–6(3), 5–7, [12–14]
Runner-up	35.	18 August 2012	Russia F12 Futures	Clay (O)	(Russia) Mikhail Biryukov	(Russia) Mikhail Fufygin (Russia) Vitali Reshetnikov	6–7(1), 2–6
Winner	36.	30 March 2013	Russia F4 Futures	Hard (I)	(Russia) Mikhail Biryukov	(Russia) Mikhail Elgin (Russia) Alexander Kudryavtsev	6–1, 7–6(3)
Runner-up	37.	20 April 2013	Uzbekistan F1 Futures	Hard (O)	(Belarus) Dzmitry Zhyrmont	(Chinese Taipei) Ti Chen (Slovakia) Marek Semjan	2–6, 6–7(3)
Winner	38.	27 April 2013	Uzbekistan F2 Futures	Hard (O)	(Belarus) Dzmitry Zhyrmont	(Belarus) Aliaksandr Bury (Russia) Mikhail Fufygin	6–2, 7–6(3)
Winner	39.	31 August 2013	Russia F12 Futures	Clay (O)	(Belarus) Aliaksandr Bury	(Russia) Evgeny Karlovskiy (Israel) Igor Smilansky	6–1, 7–6(2)
Winner	40.	18 October 2013	Kazakhstan F7 Futures	Hard (O)	(Belarus) Aliaksandr Bury	(Slovakia) Marek Semjan (Kazakhstan) Denis Yevseyev	6–7(5), 6–3, [10–7]
Winner	41.	26 October 2013	Kazakhstan F8 Futures	Hard (O)	(Belarus) Aliaksandr Bury	(Belarus) Vladzimir Kruk (Belarus) Yaraslav Shyla	5–7, 6–2, [10–3]
Winner	42.	16 August 2014	Belarus F1 Futures	Hard (O)	(Belarus) Aliaksandr Bury	(France) Hugo Nys (Australia) Dane Propoggia	7–6(0), 7–6(5)
Winner	43.	22 August 2014	Belarus F2 Futures	Hard (O)	(Belarus) Aliaksandr Bury	(France) Hugo Nys (Australia) Dane Propoggia	6–3, 7–5
Winner	44.	24 October 2014	Belarus F4 Futures	Hard (I)	(Belarus) Aliaksandr Bury	(Belarus) Artur Dubinski (Belarus) Ivan Liutarevich	7–6(4), 7–6(5)
Runner-up	45.	22 April 2017	Uzbekistan F1 Futures	Hard (O)	(Ukraine) Vladyslav Manafov	(India) N.Sriram Balaji (India) Vishnu Vardhan	4–6, 5–7
Winner	46.	3 March 2018	Russia F1 Futures	Hard (I)	(Belarus) Ivan Liutarevich	(Russia) Mikhail Fufygin (Estonia) Vladimir Ivanov	6–2, 6–4
Winner	47.	2 June 2018	Uzbekistan F3 Futures	Hard (O)	(Belarus) Yaraslav Shyla	(Russia) Konstantin Kravchuk (Russia) Roman Safiullin	6–4, 7–6(2)
Runner-up	48.	7 July 2018	Spain F17 Futures	Hard (O)	(Russia) Ivan Gakhov	(Ukraine) Marat Deviatiarov (United Kingdom) Evan Hoyt	7–6(4), 5–7, [5–10]
Runner-up	49.	11 August 2018	Belarus F1 Futures	Hard (O)	(Belarus) Ivan Liutarevich	(Israel) Igor Smilansky (Brazil) Fernando Yamacita	3–6, 0–6
Winner	50.	29 June 2025	M25 Monastir, Tunisia	Hard	Daniil Ostapenkov	(Republic of Ireland) Charles Barry (New Zealand) Ajeet Rai	7–5, 6–4
Runner-up	51.	5 October 2025	M25 Sharm El Sheikh, Egypt	Hard	Daniil Ostapenkov	(United Kingdom) James MacKinlay (United Kingdom) Connor Thomson	7–6^{(7–4)}, 4–6, [8–10]
Runner-up	52.	12 October 2025	M25 Monastir, Tunisia	Hard	Daniil Ostapenkov	(United Kingdom) Lui Maxted (United Kingdom) Connor Thomson	3–6, 0–6
Winner	53.	19 October 2025	M25 Monastir, Tunisia	Hard	Daniil Ostapenkov	(United Kingdom) Lui Maxted (United Kingdom) Connor Thomson	7–6^{(8–6)}, 1–6, [13–11]
Runner-up	54.	18 January 2026	M15 Hurghada, Egypt	Hard	Daniil Ostapenkov	(Turkey) S Mert Özdemir (Turkey) Mert Naci Türker	6–7^{(5–7)}, 5–7
