= Daniil Ostapenkov =

Belarus tennis player

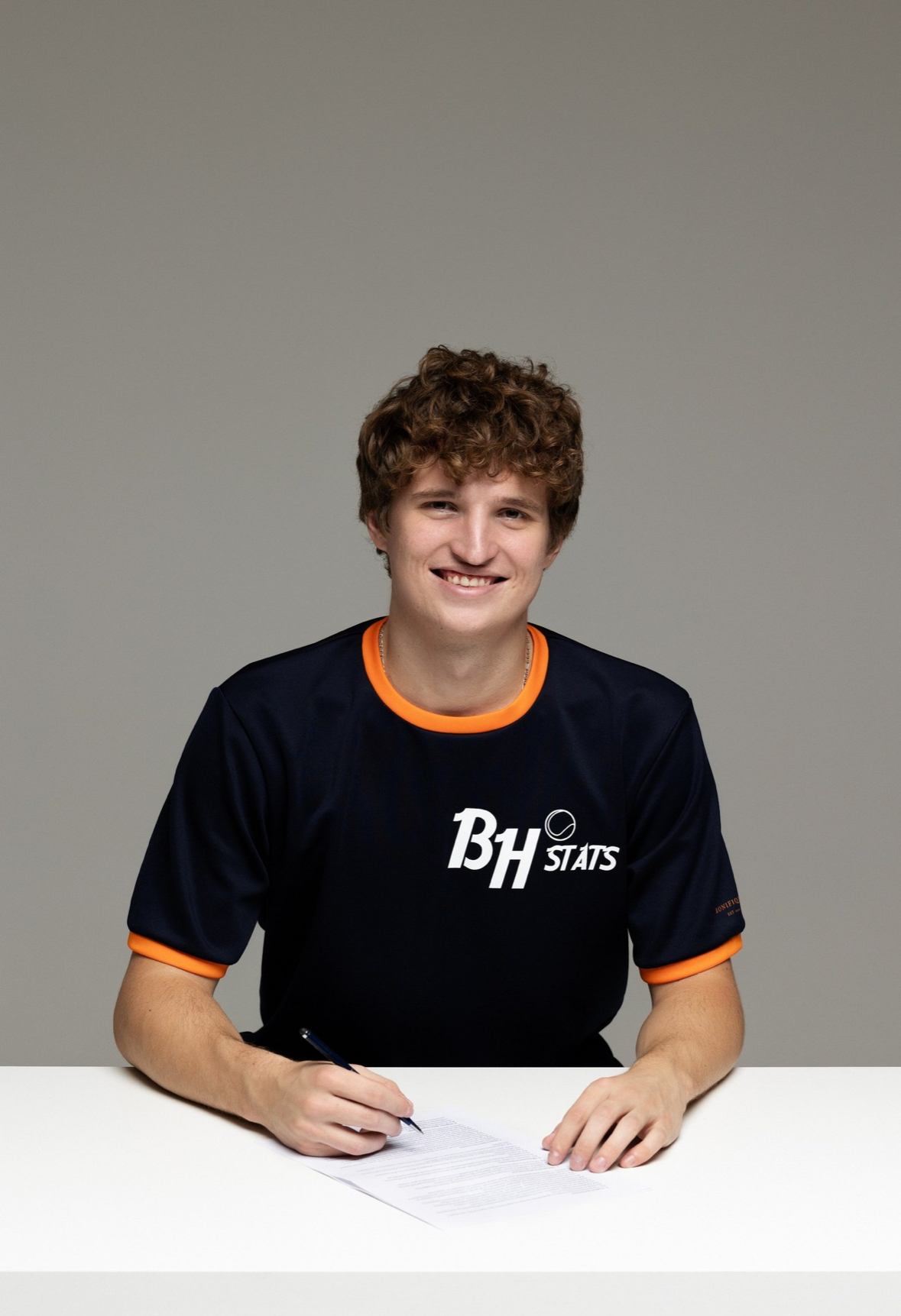
- Danill Ostapenkov
- Country (sports): Belarus
- Born: 8 May 2003 (age 23) Minsk, Belarus
- Height: 1.91 m (6 ft 3 in)
- Plays: Right-handed (two-handed backhand)
- Coach: Nikolai Fidirko
- Prize money: US $63,047

Singles
- Career record: 1–2
- Career titles: 0
- Highest ranking: No. 505 (16 November 2026)
- Current ranking: No. 505 (16 November 2026)

Doubles
- Career record: 0–1
- Career titles: 1 Challenger, 9 ITF
- Highest ranking: No. 261 (24 November 2025)
- Current ranking: No. 381 (16 November 2026)
- Last updated on: 16 November 2026.

Daniil Ostapenkov (born May 8, 2003) is a Belarusian professional tennis player. He has a career high singles ranking of No. 505 achieved on 16 November 2026 and a career high doubles ranking of No. 261 achieved on 24 November 2025. He achieved a career-high junior ITF ranking of world No. 48.

== Career ==
Ostapenkov is best known for his shocking upset win, in straight sets, over world No. 15 and former world No. 8 Diego Schwartzman during a Davis Cup match against Argentina. At the time, Ostapenkov did not have an ATP ranking.

== Personal info ==
In April 2024, Daniil became an ambassador for the IT company BackHandStats.

== ATP Challenger and ITF Tour finals ==
=== Singles: 0 (0–1) ===
Legend (doubles) ATP Challenger Tour (0–0) ITF World Tennis Tour (0–1)	Titles by surface Hard (0–1) Clay (0–0) Grass (0–0)

Result	W–L	Date	Tournament	Tier	Surface	Opponent	Score
Loss	0–1	May 2026	M25 Kutaisi, Georgia	World Tennis Tour	Hard	(Ukraine) Vadym Ursu	1–6, 6–7^{(6–8)}

=== Doubles: 10 (10–10) ===
Legend (doubles) ATP Challenger Tour (1–0) ITF World Tennis Tour (9–10)	Titles by surface Hard (10–8) Clay (0–2) Grass (0–0)

Result	W–L	Date	Tournament	Tier	Surface	Partner	Opponent	Score
Loss	0–1	Aug 2022	M25 Tbilisi, Georgia	World Tennis Tour	Clay	Erik Arutiunian	Ivan Liutarevich (Kazakhstan) Grigoriy Lomakin	6–3, 6–7^{(4–7)}, [5–10]
Win	1–1	Nov 2022	M15 Sharm El Sheikh, Egypt	World Tennis Tour	Hard	Erik Arutiunian	(Austria) Lukas Kreiner (Latvia) Robert Strombachs	6–3, 6–4
Win	2–1	Feb 2023	M25 Monastir, Tunisia	World Tennis Tour	Hard	Erik Arutiunian	(Austria) Neil Oberleitner (Ukraine) Oleksandr Ovcharenko	6–1, 6–7^{(3–7)}, [10–6]
Loss	2–2	Jul 2023	M15 Shanghai, China	World Tennis Tour	Hard	Erik Arutiunian	(Switzerland) Luca Castelnuovo (China) Wang Aoran	1–6, 5–7
Loss	2–3	Jul 2023	M15 Novi Sad, Serbia	World Tennis Tour	Clay	Erik Arutiunian	(Argentina) Leonardo Aboian (Argentina) Valerio Aboian	3–6, 2–6
Win	3–3	Sep 2023	M25 Monastir, Tunisia	World Tennis Tour	Hard	(South Africa) Kris van Wyk	(Italy) Stefano Reitano (Dominican Republic) Nick Hardt	Walkover
Win	4–3	Dec 2024	M15 Sharm El Sheikh, Egypt	World Tennis Tour	Hard	Erik Arutiunian	(Italy) Alexander Binda; Evgeny Philippov	6–1, 6–2
Loss	4–4	Jan 2025	M15 Sharm El Sheikh, Egypt	World Tennis Tour	Hard	Erik Arutiunian	Aliaksandr Liaonenka; Alexander Zgirovsky	5–7, 3–6
Win	5–4	Jan 2025	M15 Sharm El Sheikh, Egypt	World Tennis Tour	Hard	Erik Arutiunian	(France) Pierre Delage (France) Louis Dussin	6–2, 4–6, [10–6]
Loss	5–5	Feb 2025	M15 Sharm El Sheikh, Egypt	World Tennis Tour	Hard	Erik Arutiunian	(Italy) Federico Bondioli (Italy) Carlo Alberto Caniato	6–4, 6–7^{(1–7)}, [4–10]
Loss	5–6	Apr 2025	M25 Sharm El Sheikh, Egypt	World Tennis Tour	Hard	Erik Arutiunian	(United Kingdom) Ben Jones (Estonia) Kristjan Tamm	4–6, 3–6
Win	6–6	Jun 2025	M25 Monastir, Tunisia	World Tennis Tour	Hard	(South Africa) Kris van Wyk	(Brazil) Gilbert Klier Júnior (Brazil) Bruno Oliveira	Walkover
Win	7–6	Jun 2025	M25 Monastir, Tunisia	World Tennis Tour	Hard	Sergey Betov	(Republic of Ireland) Charles Barry (New Zealand) Ajeet Rai	7–5, 6–4
Loss	7–7	Oct 2025	M25 Sharm El Sheikh, Egypt	World Tennis Tour	Hard	Sergey Betov	(United Kingdom) James MacKinlay (United Kingdom) Connor Thomson	7–6^{(7–4)}, 4–6, [8–10]
Loss	7–8	Oct 2025	M25 Monastir, Tunisia	World Tennis Tour	Hard	Sergey Betov	(United Kingdom) Lui Maxted (United Kingdom) Connor Thomson	0–6, 3–6
Win	8–8	Oct 2025	M25 Monastir, Tunisia	World Tennis Tour	Hard	Sergey Betov	(United Kingdom) Lui Maxted (United Kingdom) Connor Thomson	7–6^{(8–6)}, 1–6, [13–11]
Win	9–8	Nov 2025	Soma Bay Open, Egypt	Challenger	Hard	Sergey Betov	(Egypt) Michael Bassem Sobhy (Egypt) Fares Zakaria	6–4, 6–2
Loss	9–9	Jan 2026	M15 Hurghada, Egypt	World Tennis Tour	Hard	Egor Gerasimov	(Turkey) S Mert Özdemir (Turkey) Mert Naci Türker	6–3, 6–7^{(}^{8–10)}, [4–10]
Loss	9–10	Jan 2026	M15 Hurghada, Egypt	World Tennis Tour	Hard	Sergey Betov	(Turkey) S Mert Özdemir (Turkey) Mert Naci Türker	6–7^{(5–7)}, 5–7
Win	10–10	May 2026	M15 Kutaisi, Georgia	World Tennis Tour	Hard	Kirill Mishkin	(Armenia) Daniil Sarksian (Uzbekistan) Maxim Shin	7–6^{(7–5)}, 6–7^{(4–7)}, [10–7]
