= Soma Bay =

Coastal resort in the Red Sea Governorate, Egypt

- Somabay
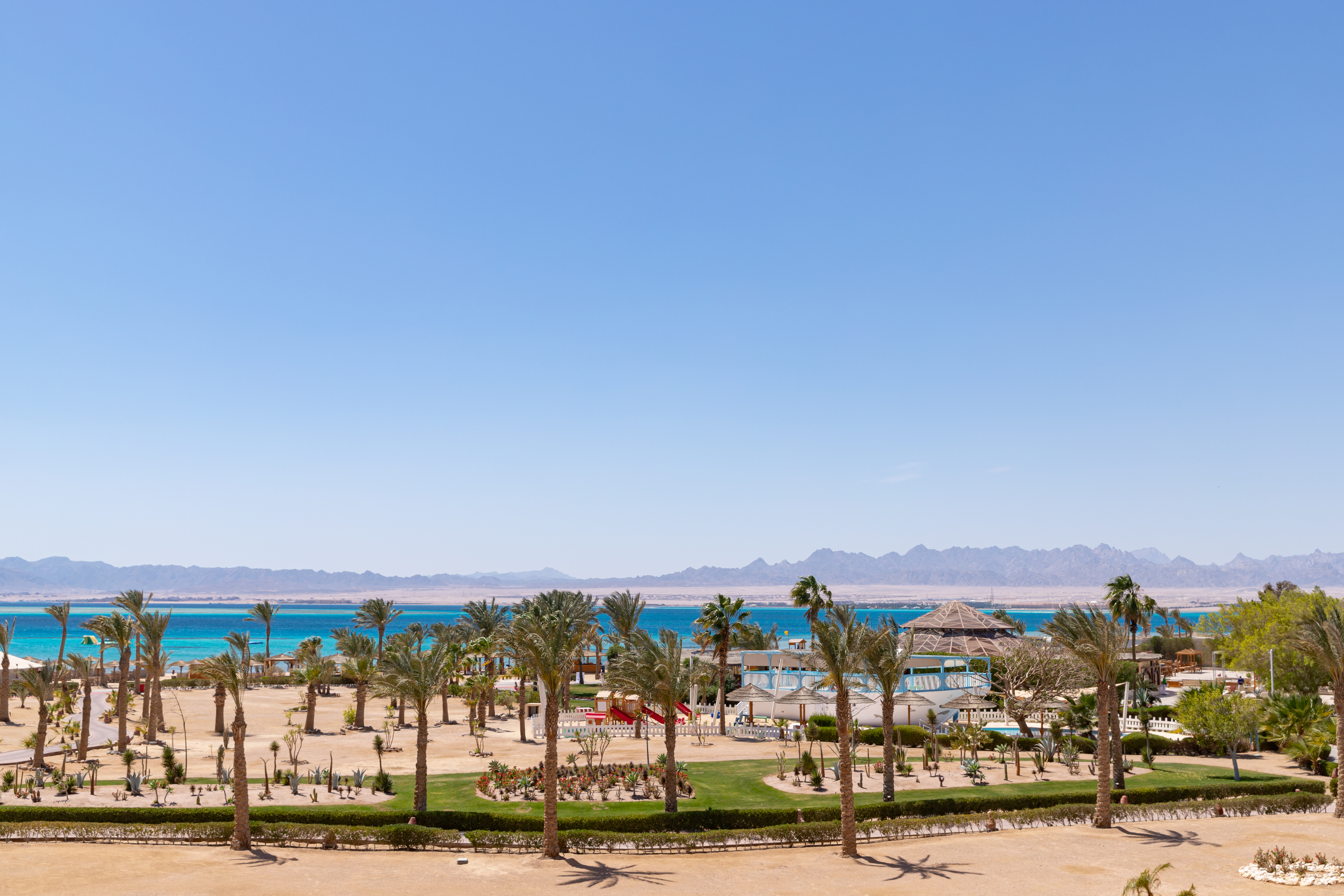
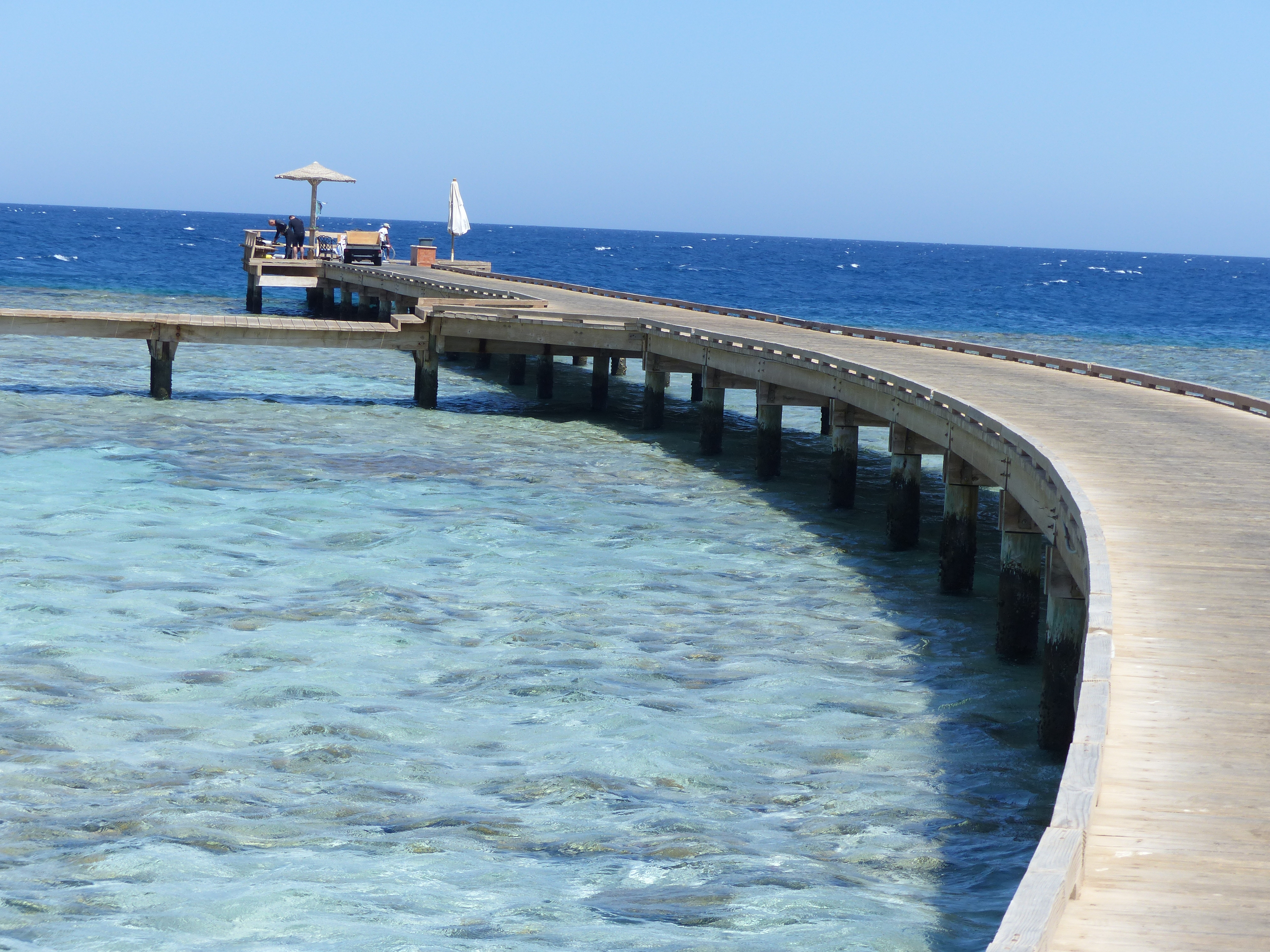
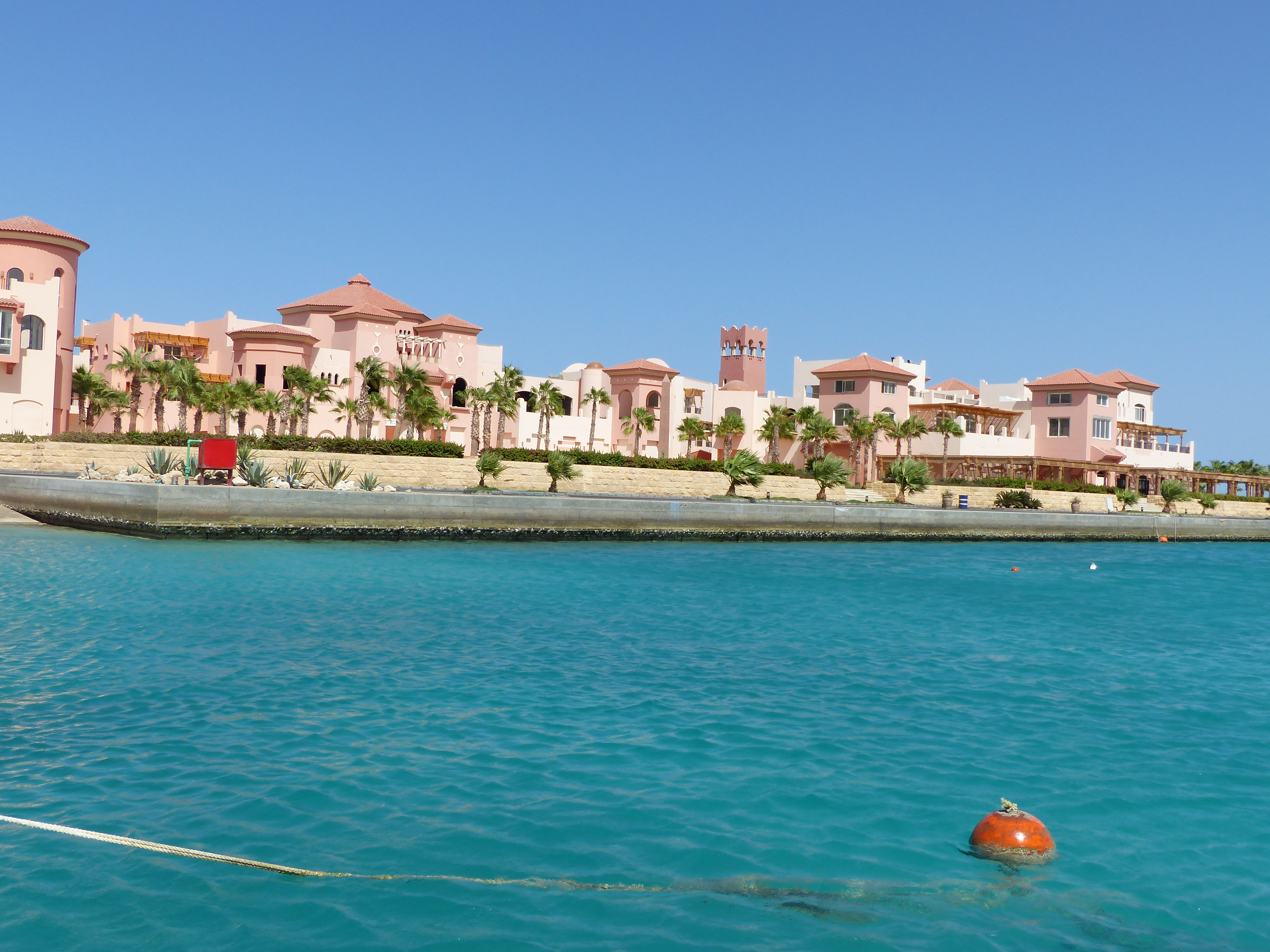
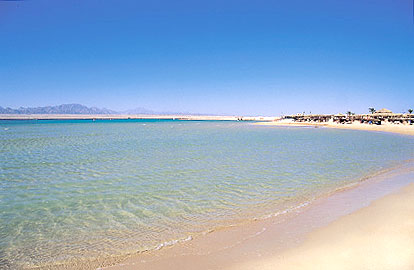
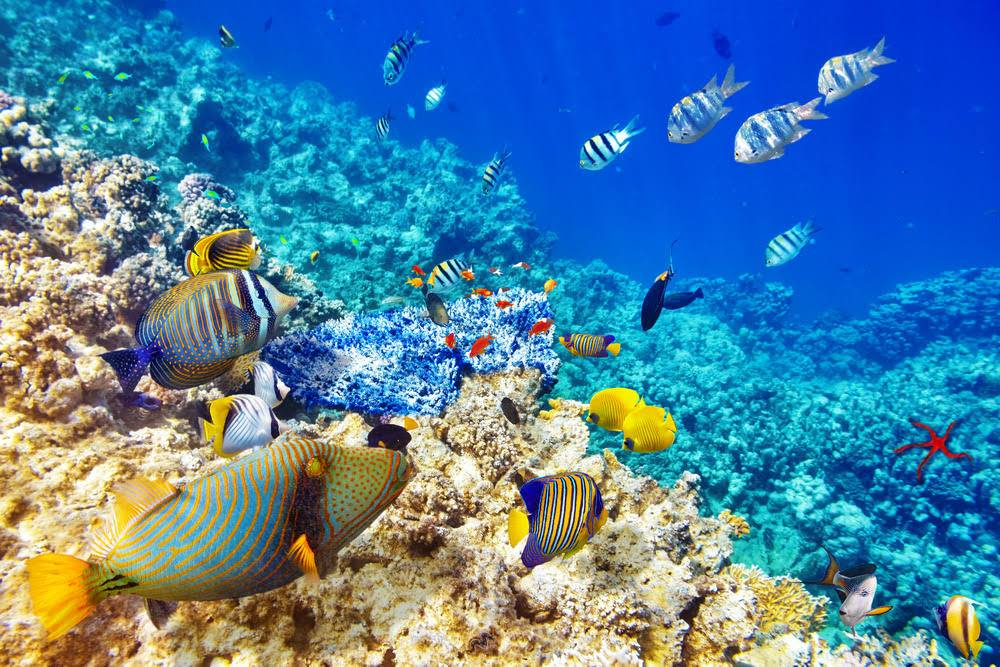

- Location in Egypt
- Country: Egypt
- Governorate: Red Sea Governorate
- Time zone: UTC+2 (EET)
  - Summer (DST): UTC+3 (EEST)
- Website: www.somabay.com

Soma Bay is a coastal resort on the Red Sea in Egypt, 45 km (28 mi) south of Hurghada International Airport and about 28 km (17 mi) north of Safaga port. The 10,000,000 m^{2} (2,500 acres), self-contained community of Soma Bay is located on a peninsula surrounded on all sides by the sea. About 5 km (3.1 mi) in length and 2 km (1.2 mi) wide, the peninsula is accessed via a 7 km (4.3 mi) private road through a single controlled entry gate.

== Overview ==
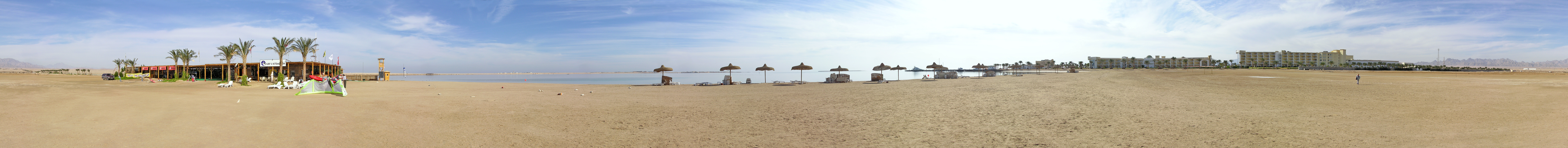
Soma Bay panorama

Leisure activities at Soma Bay include Red Sea diving at its reef and other nearby diving sites. The six resorts (Palm Royale Resort, Kempinski, Sheraton, Robinson Club, The Cascades and The Breakers Diving & Surfing Lodge) also have access to an 18-hole, par 72 championship golf course and golf academy designed by Gary Player. Soma Bay also has one of the largest spas and thalassotherapy centers in the region. Water sports are popular due to the prevailing winds which allow for windsurfing, kitesurfing and sailing.

Soma Bay also has several residential compounds as it has become increasingly popular with Egyptian and foreign tourists. It is prominently divided into a number of areas including Soma Breeze, Mesca, Reef Town, Wadi Jebal, Bay West, and Bay Central.

== See also ==
- Red Sea Riviera
