= 2015 IS Open de Tênis – Singles =

Singles
- 2015 IS Open de Tênis

Final
- Champion: (Argentina) Carlos Berlocq
- Runner-up: (Belgium) Kimmer Coppejans
- Score: 6–3, 6–1

Events
Singles	Doubles
← 2013 ·	IS Open de Tênis

This was the third edition of the tournament. It was held after a one-year pause.

== Seeds ==
1. (Argentina) Diego Schwartzman (withdrew due to right shoulder injury)
2. (Argentina) Guido Pella (withdrew due to lower back injury)
3. (Argentina) Facundo Argüello (second round)
4. (Belgium) Kimmer Coppejans (final)
5. (Brazil) André Ghem (second round)
6. (Argentina) Facundo Bagnis (semifinals)
7. (Argentina) Carlos Berlocq (champion)
8. (Brazil) Rogério Dutra Silva (semifinals)

== Draw ==
=== Key ===
- Q = Qualifier
- WC = Wild card
- LL = Lucky loser
- Alt = Alternate
- SE = Special exempt
- PR = Protected ranking
- ITF = ITF entry
- JE = Junior exempt
- w/o = Walkover
- r = Retired
- d = Defaulted
- SR = Special ranking

=== Finals ===
Semifinals
6	(Argentina) Facundo Bagnis	4	4
4	(Belgium) Kimmer Coppejans	6	6
7	(Argentina) Carlos Berlocq	6	6
8	(Brazil) Rogério Dutra Silva	3	4

Final
4	(Belgium) Kimmer Coppejans	3	1
7	(Argentina) Carlos Berlocq	6	6

=== Top half ===
First round
LL	(Brazil) R Hocevar	3	4
(Argentina) T Lipovšek	6	6
(Chile) C Garín	1	6	6
Q	(Brazil) J Menezes	6	3	3
(Brazil) J Pereira	2	6	3
(Portugal) G Elias	6	3	6
WC	(Brazil) M Zormann	4	4
6	(Argentina) F Bagnis	6	6
4	(Belgium) K Coppejans	6	6
(Argentina) N Kicker	2	3
WC	(Brazil) T Monteiro	6	2	6
Q	(Brazil) Carlos E. Severino	3	6	2
(Argentina) A Velotti	6	6
(France) A Michon	0	2
(Brazil) C Zampieri	4	2
5	(Brazil) A Ghem	6	6

Second round
(Argentina) T Lipovšek	6	6
(Chile) C Garín	4	2
(Portugal) G Elias	3	4
6	(Argentina) F Bagnis	6	6
4	(Belgium) K Coppejans	6	6
WC	(Brazil) T Monteiro	2	1
(Argentina) A Velotti	6^{3}	6	7
5	(Brazil) A Ghem	7^{7}	3	5

Quarterfinals
(Argentina) T Lipovšek	3	4
6	(Argentina) F Bagnis	6	6
4	(Belgium) K Coppejans	w/o
(Argentina) A Velotti

Semifinals
6	(Argentina) F Bagnis	4	4
4	(Belgium) K Coppejans	6	6

=== Bottom half ===
First round
7	(Argentina) C Berlocq	6	6
(Austria) M Linzer	3	2
(Chile) H Podlipnik	1	2
(Argentina) G Andreozzi	6	6
(Sweden) C Lindell	6	6
WC	(Brazil) P Sakamoto	2	3
(Portugal) FF Silva	7^{7}	4	3
3	(Argentina) F Argüello	6^{4}	6	6
8	(Brazil) R Dutra Silva	6	6
LL	(Brazil) JP Sorgi	4	2
(Chile) JC Sáez	6	3	2
Q	(Belgium) J De Loore	4	6	6
WC	(Brazil) O Luz	6^{4}	3
(Argentina) R Olivo	7^{7}	6
(Dominican Republic) J Hernández	6	7^{7}
Q	(Brazil) A Miele	2	6^{3}

Second round
7	(Argentina) C Berlocq	7^{7}	5	4
(Argentina) G Andreozzi	6^{3}	7	2^{r}
(Sweden) C Lindell	6	6
3	(Argentina) F Argüello	3	4
8	(Brazil) R Dutra Silva	3	6	6
Q	(Belgium) J De Loore	6	4	0
(Argentina) R Olivo	6	6^{4}	6
(Dominican Republic) J Hernández	0	7^{7}	2

Quarterfinals
7	(Argentina) C Berlocq	7	6
(Sweden) C Lindell	5	4
8	(Brazil) R Dutra Silva	6	4	7
(Argentina) R Olivo	3	6	5

Semifinals
7	(Argentina) C Berlocq	6	6
8	(Brazil) R Dutra Silva	3	4
