= 2014 São Paulo Challenger de Tênis – Singles =

Singles
- 2014 São Paulo Challenger de Tênis

Final
- Champion: (Brazil) Rogério Dutra da Silva
- Runner-up: (Slovenia) Blaž Rola
- Score: 6–4, 6–2

Events
Singles	Doubles
← 2013 ·	São Paulo Challenger de Tênis	· 2015 →

Last year's champion Paul Capdeville was not defending his title.

Rogério Dutra da Silva won the title, defeating Blaž Rola in the final, 6–4, 6–2.

== Seeds ==
1. (Slovenia) Blaž Rola (final)
2. (Argentina) Guido Pella (quarterfinals)
3. (Argentina) Horacio Zeballos (quarterfinals)
4. (Argentina) Diego Sebastian Schwartzman (second round)
5. (Brazil) João Souza (quarterfinals)
6. (Brazil) Rogério Dutra da Silva (champion)
7. (Argentina) Máximo González (quarterfinals)
8. (Portugal) Gastão Elias (semifinals)

== Draw ==
=== Key ===
- Q = Qualifier
- WC = Wild card
- LL = Lucky loser
- Alt = Alternate
- SE = Special exempt
- PR = Protected ranking
- ITF = ITF entry
- JE = Junior exempt
- w/o = Walkover
- r = Retired
- d = Defaulted
- SR = Special ranking

=== Finals ===
Semifinals
1	(Slovenia) Blaž Rola	6	6^{2}	6
(France) Axel Michon	1	7^{7}	3
6	(Brazil) Rogério Dutra da Silva	7^{7}	6
8	(Portugal) Gastão Elias	6^{4}	1

Final
1	(Slovenia) Blaž Rola	4	2
6	(Brazil) Rogério Dutra da Silva	6	6

=== Top half ===
First round
1	(Slovenia) B Rola	6	6
(Brazil) J Pereira	4	2
(Brazil) F Romboli	1	2
Q	(Argentina) G Durán	6	6
(Brazil) T Monteiro	7^{7}	3	2
WC	(Brazil) B Sant'Anna	6^{3}	6	6
(Argentina) M Alund	1	4
7	(Argentina) M González	6	6
4	(Argentina) DS Schwartzman	6	6
WC	(Brazil) F Saretta	2	2
Q	(Argentina) Gabriel Alejandro Hidalgo	5	3
(France) A Michon	7	6
(Italy) A Brizzi	4	2
(Portugal) R Machado	6	6
Q	(Egypt) S Sabry	4	5
5	(Brazil) J Souza	6	7

Second round
1	(Slovenia) B Rola	7	6
Q	(Argentina) G Durán	5	3
WC	(Brazil) B Sant'Anna	7^{8}	5	2
7	(Argentina) M González	6^{6}	7	7
4	(Argentina) DS Schwartzman	2	3
(France) A Michon	6	6
(Portugal) R Machado	4	4
5	(Brazil) J Souza	6	6

Quarterfinals
1	(Slovenia) B Rola	3	7^{7}	7^{7}
7	(Argentina) M González	6	6^{4}	6^{4}
(France) A Michon	7^{10}	6^{3}	7^{8}
5	(Brazil) J Souza	6^{8}	7^{7}	6^{6}

Semifinals
1	(Slovenia) B Rola	6	6^{2}	6
(France) A Michon	1	7^{7}	3

=== Bottom half ===
First round
6	(Brazil) R Dutra da Silva	6	7
(Argentina) JI Londero	4	5
(Belgium) K Coppejans	5	1
(Brazil) A Ghem	7	6
(Slovenia) J Semrajc	6	5
Q	(Serbia) N Ćirić	7	7
(Brazil) R Hocevar	1	4
3	(Argentina) H Zeballos	6	6
8	(Portugal) G Elias	7	2	6
(Argentina) A Molteni	5	6	0
(France) TK Wang	7	4	6
WC	(Brazil) P Sakamoto	5	6	2
(Egypt) M Safwat	1	6^{4}
(Venezuela) D Souto	6	7^{7}
WC	(Brazil) T Fernandes	3	2
2	(Argentina) G Pella	6	6

Second round
6	(Brazil) R Dutra da Silva	7^{7}	6
(Brazil) A Ghem	6^{5}	1
Q	(Serbia) N Ćirić	1	4
3	(Argentina) H Zeballos	6	6
8	(Portugal) G Elias	6	6
(France) TK Wang	3	1
(Venezuela) D Souto	6	5	4
2	(Argentina) G Pella	2	7	6

Quarterfinals
6	(Brazil) R Dutra da Silva	6	7
3	(Argentina) H Zeballos	4	5
8	(Portugal) G Elias	6	4	7
2	(Argentina) G Pella	2	6	5

Semifinals
6	(Brazil) R Dutra da Silva	7^{7}	6
8	(Portugal) G Elias	6^{4}	1
