= 2015 IS Open de Tênis =

- Date: 5–11 October
- Edition: 3rd
- Draw: 32S / 16D
- Prize money: $50,000
- Surface: Clay
- Location: São Paulo, Brazil

Champions

Singles
- (Argentina) Carlos Berlocq

Doubles
- (Chile) Hans Podlipnik / (Brazil) Caio Zampieri
← 2013 ·	IS Open de Tênis

The 2015 IS Open de Tênis was a professional tennis tournament played on clay courts. It was resumed after not being held in 2014, being the third edition of the tournament which was part of the 2015 ATP Challenger Tour. It took place in São Paulo, Brazil, on 22–28 October 2015.

== Singles entrants ==
=== Seeds ===
Country	Player	Rank^{1}	Seed
ARG	~~Diego Schwartzman~~	~~77~~	~~1~~
ARG	~~Guido Pella~~	~~94~~	~~2~~
ARG	Facundo Argüello	120	3
BEL	Kimmer Coppejans	134	4
BRA	André Ghem	141	5
ARG	Facundo Bagnis	145	6
ARG	Carlos Berlocq	162	7
BRA	Rogério Dutra Silva	164	8

- ^{1} Rankings as of 5 October 2015

=== Other entrants ===
The following players received wildcards into the singles main draw:

- (Brazil) Thiago Monteiro
- (Brazil) Orlando Luz
- (Brazil) Pedro Sakamoto
- (Brazil) Marcelo Zormann

The following players received entry from the qualifying draw:

- (Belgium) Joris De Loore
- (Brazil) João Menezes
- (Brazil) André Miele
- (Brazil) Carlos Eduardo Severino

The following players entered as lucky losers:

- (Brazil) Ricardo Hocevar
- (Brazil) João Pedro Sorgi

== Doubles entrants ==
=== Seeds ===
Country	Player	Country	Player	Rank^{1}	Seed
ARG	Nicolás Kicker	ARG	Renzo Olivo	505	1
BRA	Eduardo Dischinger	BRA	André Miele	646	2
BRA	~~Wilson Leite~~	BRA	~~Bruno Sant'anna~~	~~684~~	~~3~~
CHI	Hans Podlipnik	BRA	Caio Zampieri	713	4

- ^{1} Rankings as of 13 October 2015

=== Other entrants ===
The following pairs received wildcards into the doubles main draw:

- (Brazil) Igor Marcondes / (Brazil) João Menezes
- (Brazil) Thiago Monteiro / (Brazil) Pedro Sakamoto
- (Brazil) Felipe Carvalho / (Brazil) Rodrigo Carvalho

The following pairs entered as an alternate:

- (Brazil) Carlos Eduardo Severino / (Brazil) João Pedro Sorgi

The following pairs entered using a protected ranking:

- (Portugal) Gastão Elias / (Portugal) Pedro Sousa

== Champions ==
=== Singles ===
- (Argentina) Carlos Berlocq def. (Belgium) Kimmer Coppejans 6–3, 6–1

=== Doubles ===
- (Chile) Hans Podlipnik / (Brazil) Caio Zampieri def. (Argentina) Nicolás Kicker / (Argentina) Renzo Olivo 7–5, 6–0
