= 2015 IS Open de Tênis – Doubles =

Doubles
- 2015 IS Open de Tênis

Final
- Champions: (Chile) Hans Podlipnik (Brazil) Caio Zampieri
- Runners-up: (Argentina) Nicolás Kicker (Argentina) Renzo Olivo
- Score: 7–5, 6–0

Events
Singles	Doubles
← 2013 ·	IS Open de Tênis

This was the third edition of the tournament. It was held after a one year pause.

== Seeds ==
1. (Argentina) Nicolás Kicker / (Argentina) Renzo Olivo (final)
2. (Brazil) Eduardo Dischinger / (Brazil) André Miele (first round)
3. (Brazil) Wilson Leite / (Brazil) Bruno Sant'Anna (withdrew)
4. (Chile) Hans Podlipnik / (Brazil) Caio Zampieri (champions)

== Draw ==
=== Key ===
- Q = Qualifier
- WC = Wild card
- LL = Lucky loser
- Alt = Alternate
- SE = Special exempt
- PR = Protected ranking
- ITF = ITF entry
- JE = Junior exempt
- w/o = Walkover
- r = Retired
- d = Defaulted
- SR = Special ranking

First round
1	(Argentina) N Kicker (Argentina) R Olivo	6	6
(Austria) M Linzer (France) A Michon	3	4
WC	(Brazil) I Marcondes (Brazil) J Menezes	0	3
(Brazil) R Dutra Silva (Brazil) A Ghem	6	6
(Peru) S Galdós (Dominican Republic) J Hernández	6	6
(Portugal) FF Silva (Portugal) L Tavares	3	4
(Brazil) O Luz (Brazil) M Zormann	3	7	[5]
(Belgium) K Coppejans (Belgium) J De Loore	6	5	[10]
Alt	(Brazil) Carlos Eduardo Severino (Brazil) JP Sorgi	1	2
WC	(Brazil) T Monteiro (Brazil) P Sakamoto	6	6
WC	(Brazil) Felipe Carvalho (Brazil) Rodrigo Carvalho	5	0
4	(Chile) H Podlipnik (Brazil) C Zampieri	7	6
(Brazil) J Pereira (Brazil) Alexandre Tsuchiya	6	6
PR	(Portugal) G Elias (Portugal) P Sousa	3	2
(Brazil) R Hocevar (Sweden) C Lindell	6	2	[10]
2	(Brazil) E Dischinger (Brazil) A Miele	3	6	[7]

Quarterfinals
1	(Argentina) N Kicker (Argentina) R Olivo	3	6	[10]
(Brazil) R Dutra Silva (Brazil) A Ghem	6	2	[7]
(Peru) S Galdós (Dominican Republic) J Hernández	6	7
(Belgium) K Coppejans (Belgium) J De Loore	3	5
WC	(Brazil) T Monteiro (Brazil) P Sakamoto	4	4
4	(Chile) H Podlipnik (Brazil) C Zampieri	6	6
(Brazil) J Pereira (Brazil) A Tsuchiya	7^{8}	3	[10]
(Brazil) R Hocevar (Sweden) C Lindell	6^{6}	6	[3]

Semifinals
1	(Argentina) N Kicker (Argentina) R Olivo	6	6
(Peru) S Galdós (Dominican Republic) J Hernández	4	1
4	(Chile) H Podlipnik (Brazil) C Zampieri	6	6
(Brazil) J Pereira (Brazil) A Tsuchiya	3	3

Final
1	(Argentina) N Kicker (Argentina) R Olivo	5	0
4	(Chile) H Podlipnik (Brazil) C Zampieri	7	6
