= 2013 São Paulo Challenger de Tênis – Women's doubles =

Women's doubles
- 2013 São Paulo Challenger de Tênis

Final
- Champions: (Brazil) Laura Pigossi (Argentina) Carolina Zeballos
- Runners-up: (Brazil) Nathália Rossi (Brazil) Luisa Stefani
- Score: 6–3, 6–4

Events
Singles	men	women
Doubles	men	women
← 2012 ·	São Paulo Challenger de Tênis	· 2014 →

This was a new event on the 2013 ITF Women's Circuit at São Paulo's Clube Hebraica as the men's ATP Challenger Tour came to the Brazilian city again after April's IS Open de Tênis.

Paula Cristina Gonçalves and Roxane Vaisemberg were the defending champions from 2012's $10,000 event at São Paulo's Clube Painieras do Morumby, but Gonçalves chose not to defend her title. Vaisemberg partnered up with Flávia Dechandt Araújo, but they lost in the semifinals.

Laura Pigossi and Carolina Zeballos won the tournament, defeating Nathália Rossi and Luisa Stefani in the final, 6–3, 6–4.

== Seeds ==
1. (Brazil) Laura Pigossi / (Argentina) Carolina Zeballos (champions)
2. (Brazil) Carla Forte / (Brazil) Eduarda Piai (semifinals)
3. (Chile) Fernanda Brito / (Brazil) Gabriela Cé (first round)
4. (Argentina) Victoria Bosio / (Guatemala) Daniela Schippers (quarterfinals)

== Draw ==
=== Key ===
- Q = Qualifier
- WC = Wild card
- LL = Lucky loser
- Alt = Alternate
- ITF = ITF entry
- PR = Protected ranking
- SR = Special ranking
- SE = Special exempt
- JE = Junior exempt
- JR = Junior Accelerator Programme entrant
- CO = College Accelerator Programme entrant
- NG = Next Gen Accelerator Program entrant
- w/o = Walkover
- r = Retired
- d = Defaulted

First round
1	(Brazil) L Pigossi (Argentina) C Zeballos	6	6
(Brazil) F Guimarães Bueno (Brazil) N Kurata	2	2
(Brazil) M Danzini (Brazil) B Gueno	2	7	[8]
(Paraguay) G Ferreira Sanabria (Brazil) L Garcia Vidal	6	5	[10]
3	(Chile) F Brito (Brazil) G Cé	6	4	[8]
(Brazil) F Dechandt Araújo (Brazil) R Vaisemberg	2	6	[10]
(Argentina) C Barrionuevo (Brazil) M Guimarães Bueno	2	1
(Argentina) S Blanco (Argentina) C Bruzzesi Avella	6	6
(Argentina) AV Gobbi Monllau (Argentina) A Madcur	3	1
(Brazil) N Rossi (Brazil) L Stefani	6	6
WC	(Brazil) LNM Monteiro (Brazil) B Oliveira	0	0
4	(Argentina) V Bosio (Guatemala) D Schippers	6	6
(Brazil) S Abel (Brazil) G Tomita	6	7^{7}
WC	(Brazil) S Chow (Brazil) AC Souza	1	6^{3}
WC	(Brazil) S Ferigatto (Brazil) J Tozzi	0	0
2	(Brazil) C Forte (Brazil) E Piai	6	6

Quarterfinals
1	(Brazil) L Pigossi (Argentina) C Zeballos	6	3	[10]
(Paraguay) G Ferreira Sanabria (Brazil) L Garcia Vidal	3	6	[7]
(Brazil) F Dechandt Araújo (Brazil) R Vaisemberg	6	7
(Argentina) S Blanco (Argentina) C Bruzzesi Avella	4	5
(Brazil) N Rossi (Brazil) L Stefani	6	7
4	(Argentina) V Bosio (Guatemala) D Schippers	2	5
(Brazil) S Abel (Brazil) G Tomita	4	1
2	(Brazil) C Forte (Brazil) E Piai	6	6

Semifinals
1	(Brazil) L Pigossi (Argentina) C Zeballos	7	6
(Brazil) F Dechandt Araújo (Brazil) R Vaisemberg	5	2
(Brazil) N Rossi (Brazil) L Stefani	3	7	[10]
2	(Brazil) C Forte (Brazil) E Piai	6	5	[2]

Final
1	(Brazil) L Pigossi (Argentina) C Zeballos	6	6
(Brazil) N Rossi (Brazil) L Stefani	3	4
