= 2013 São Paulo Challenger de Tênis – Women's singles =

Women's singles
- 2013 São Paulo Challenger de Tênis

Final
- Champion: (Peru) Bianca Botto
- Runner-up: (Brazil) Gabriela Cé
- Score: 7–6^{(7–2)}, 5–7, 6–2

Events
Singles	men	women
Doubles	men	women
← 2012 ·	São Paulo Challenger de Tênis	· 2014 →

This was a new event on the 2013 ITF Women's Circuit at São Paulo's Clube Hebraica as the men's ATP Challenger Tour came to the Brazilian city again after April's IS Open de Tênis.

Roxane Vaisemberg was the defending champion from 2012's $10,000 event at São Paulo's Clube Painieras do Morumby, but lost in the first round to Bianca Botto.

Botto went on to win the tournament, defeating Gabriela Cé in the final, 7–6^{(7–2)}, 5–7, 6–2.

== Seeds ==
1. (Chile) Fernanda Brito (second round)
2. (Argentina) Carolina Zeballos (quarterfinals)
3. (Brazil) Laura Pigossi (second round)
4. (Brazil) Ana Clara Duarte (quarterfinals)
5. (Brazil) Gabriela Cé (final)
6. (Argentina) ~~Andrea Benítez~~ (withdrew)
7. (Brazil) Eduarda Piai (first round)
8. (Argentina) Victoria Bosio (semifinals)

== Main draw ==
=== Key ===
- Q = Qualifier
- WC = Wild card
- LL = Lucky loser
- Alt = Alternate
- ITF = ITF entry
- PR = Protected ranking
- SR = Special ranking
- SE = Special exempt
- JE = Junior exempt
- JR = Junior Accelerator Programme entrant
- CO = College Accelerator Programme entrant
- NG = Next Gen Accelerator Program entrant
- w/o = Walkover
- r = Retired
- d = Defaulted

=== Finals ===
Semifinals
(Peru) Bianca Botto	6	7^{10}
8	(Argentina) Victoria Bosio	2	6^{8}
(Brazil) Nathália Rossi	2	2
5	(Brazil) Gabriela Cé	6	6

Final
(Peru) Bianca Botto	7^{7}	5	6
5	(Brazil) Gabriela Cé	6^{2}	7	2

=== Top half ===
First round
1	(Chile) F Brito	6	6
WC	(Brazil) MV Beirão	0	2
(Peru) B Botto	6	6
(Brazil) R Vaisemberg	3	1
Q	(Paraguay) G Ferreira Sanabria	7	3	7
Q	(Brazil) M Alves Pereira Valle	5	6	5
Q	(Argentina) C Bruzzesi Avella	7^{7}	3	2
LL	(Brazil) M Guimarães Bueno	6^{5}	6	6
3	(Brazil) L Pigossi	7	6
WC	(Brazil) S Abel	5	1
(Argentina) G Pérez Rojas	6	1	6
(Argentina) S Blanco	4	6	2
(Brazil) S Czarniak Rego	5	1
Q	(Brazil) JR Cardoso	7	6
(Argentina) A Madcur	2	4
8	(Argentina) V Bosio	6	6

Second round
1	(Chile) F Brito	6	4	5
(Peru) B Botto	4	6	7
Q	(Paraguay) G Ferreira Sanabria	6	3	6
LL	(Brazil) M Guimarães Bueno	0	6	1
3	(Brazil) L Pigossi	5	6	2
(Argentina) G Pérez Rojas	7	4	6
Q	(Brazil) JR Cardoso	2	0
8	(Argentina) V Bosio	6	6

Quarterfinals
(Peru) B Botto	6	6
Q	(Paraguay) G Ferreira Sanabria	2	0
(Argentina) G Pérez Rojas	6	1	2
8	(Argentina) V Bosio	4	6	6

Semifinals
(Peru) B Botto	6	7^{10}
8	(Argentina) V Bosio	2	6^{8}

=== Bottom half ===
First round
7	(Brazil) E Piai	6^{4}	6^{2}
(Brazil) C Forte	7^{7}	7^{7}
(Brazil) N Rossi	6	6
Q	(Brazil) B Gueno	1	0
(Brazil) N Kurata	6	6
Q	(Brazil) B Oliveira	2	1
Q	(Brazil) L Garcia Vidal	6^{7}	1
4	(Brazil) AC Duarte	7^{9}	6
5	(Brazil) G Cé	4	6	6
(Argentina) AV Gobbi Monllau	6	1	4
(Brazil) F Guimarães Bueno	6	3	6
WC	(Brazil) M Silva	0	6	0
WC	(Brazil) LNM Monteiro	0	1
Q	(Brazil) L Stefani	6	6
(Brazil) M Danzini	1	3
2	(Argentina) C Zeballos	6	6

Second round
(Brazil) C Forte	1	1
(Brazil) N Rossi	6	6
(Brazil) N Kurata	5	6^{6}
4	(Brazil) AC Duarte	7	7^{8}
5	(Brazil) G Cé	6	6
(Brazil) F Guimarães Bueno	0	1
Q	(Brazil) L Stefani	5	4
2	(Argentina) C Zeballos	7	6

Quarterfinals
(Brazil) N Rossi	6	6
4	(Brazil) AC Duarte	0	4
5	(Brazil) G Cé	6	4	6
2	(Argentina) C Zeballos	3	6	0

Semifinals
(Brazil) N Rossi	2	2
5	(Brazil) G Cé	6	6
