= 2015 São Paulo Challenger de Tênis =

Professional tennis tournament in Brazil

- Date: 27 April – 2 May
- Edition: 5th
- Draw: 32S / 16D
- Prize money: $50,000
- Surface: Clay
- Location: São Paulo, Brazil

Champions

Singles
- (Argentina) Guido Pella

Doubles
- (United States) Chase Buchanan / (Slovenia) Blaž Rola
← 2014 ·	São Paulo Challenger de Tênis	· 2016 →

The 2015 São Paulo Challenger de Tênis was a professional tennis tournament played on clay courts. It was the fifth edition of the tournament which was part of the 2015 ATP Challenger Tour. It took place in São Paulo, Brazil between 27 April and 2 May 2015.

== Singles main-draw entrants ==
=== Seeds ===
Country	Player	Rank^{1}	Seed
ARG	Máximo González	96	1
SLO	Blaž Rola	112	2
BRA	André Ghem	151	3
USA	Chase Buchanan	162	4
ARG	Guido Pella	163	5
BRA	Guilherme Clezar	181	6
CHI	Nicolás Jarry	193	7
ARG	Guido Andreozzi	200	8

- ^{1} Rankings are as of April 20, 2015.

=== Other entrants ===
The following players received wildcards into the singles main draw:

- (Brazil) Rogério Dutra Silva
- (Brazil) Thiago Monteiro
- (Brazil) Wilson Leite
- (Brazil) Pedro Sakamoto

The following players received entry from the qualifying draw:

- (Argentina) Federico Coria
- (Brazil) Ricardo Hocevar
- (Argentina) Tomás Lipovšek Puches
- (Brazil) José Pereira

The following players received entry as a special exempt:

- (Brazil) Orlando Luz

== Doubles entrants ==
=== Seeds ===
Country	Player	Country	Player	Rank	Seed
ARG	Máximo González	VEN	Roberto Maytín	181	1
ARG	Andrés Molteni	ARG	Guido Pella	268	2
BRA	Marcelo Demoliner	MEX	Miguel Ángel Reyes-Varela	271	3
ARG	Guido Andreozzi	PER	Sergio Galdós	387	4

=== Other entrants ===
The following pairs received wildcards into the doubles main draw:

- (Brazil) Rogério Dutra Silva / (Brazil) André Ghem
- (Brazil) Rodrigo Carvalho / (Brazil) Diego Padilha
- (Brazil) Felipe Carvalho / (Brazil) Tiago Lopes

== Champions ==
=== Singles ===
- (Argentina) Guido Pella def. (Sweden) Christian Lindell, 7–5, 7–6^{(7–1)}

=== Doubles ===
- (United States) Chase Buchanan / (Slovenia) Blaž Rola def. (Argentina) Guido Andreozzi / (Peru) Sergio Galdós, 6–4, 6–4
