= 2017 São Paulo Challenger de Tênis =

- Date: 2–8 October
- Edition: 7th
- Draw: 32S / 16D
- Surface: Clay
- Location: Campinas, Brazil

Champions

Singles
- (Portugal) Gastão Elias

Doubles
- (Argentina) Máximo González / (Brazil) Fabrício Neis
- São Paulo Challenger de Tênis

The 2017 São Paulo Challenger de Tênis was a professional tennis tournament played on clay courts. It was the seventh edition of the tournament which was part of the 2017 ATP Challenger Tour. It took place in Campinas, Brazil between 2 and 8 October 2017.

== Singles main-draw entrants ==
=== Seeds ===
Country	Player	Rank^{1}	Seed
ARG	Federico Delbonis	67	1
~~POR~~	~~Pedro Sousa~~	~~102~~	~~2~~
ARG	Facundo Bagnis	111	3
ARG	Renzo Olivo	136	4
POR	Gastão Elias	147	5
SVK	Andrej Martin	170	6
BRA	João Souza	217	7
POR	Gonçalo Oliveira	229	8

- ^{1} Rankings as of 25 September 2017.

=== Other entrants ===
The following players received wildcards into the singles main draw:

- (Brazil) André Ghem
- (Brazil) Orlando Luz
- (Brazil) Christian Oliveira
- (Brazil) Bruno Sant'Anna

The following player received entry into the singles main draw as an alternate:

- (Spain) Daniel Muñoz de la Nava

The following players received entry from the qualifying draw:

- (Chile) Gonzalo Lama
- (Argentina) Tomás Lipovšek Puches
- (Brazil) José Pereira
- (Brazil) Pedro Sakamoto

The following player received entry as a lucky loser:

- (Brazil) Daniel Dutra da Silva

== Champions ==
=== Singles ===
- (Portugal) Gastão Elias def. (Argentina) Renzo Olivo 3–6, 6–3, 6–4.

=== Doubles ===
- (Argentina) Máximo González / (Brazil) Fabrício Neis def. (Portugal) Gastão Elias / (Brazil) José Pereira 6–1, 6–1.
