= 2012 IS Open de Tênis – Singles =

Singles
- 2012 IS Open de Tênis

Final
- Champion: (Slovenia) Blaž Kavčič
- Runner-up: (Brazil) Júlio Silva
- Score: 6–3, 7–5

Events
Singles	Doubles
← 2011 ·	IS Open de Tênis	· 2013 →

Blaž Kavčič won the first edition of the tournament by defeating Júlio Silva 6–3, 7–5 in the final.

== Seeds ==
1. (Slovenia) Blaž Kavčič (champion)
2. (Chile) Paul Capdeville (first round)
3. (Brazil) Ricardo Mello (first round)
4. (Brazil) Rogério Dutra da Silva (quarterfinals)
5. (Brazil) Thiago Alves (first round)
6. (Argentina) ~~Martín Alund~~ (withdrew)
7. (Brazil) Júlio Silva (final)
8. (Colombia) Carlos Salamanca (first round)

== Draw ==
=== Key ===
- Q = Qualifier
- WC = Wild card
- LL = Lucky loser
- Alt = Alternate
- SE = Special exempt
- PR = Protected ranking
- ITF = ITF entry
- JE = Junior exempt
- w/o = Walkover
- r = Retired
- d = Defaulted
- SR = Special ranking

=== Finals ===
Semifinals
1	(Slovenia) Blaž Kavčič	6	6
(Czech Republic) Ivo Minář	1	4
7	(Brazil) Júlio Silva	1	6	7
(Australia) James Duckworth	6	1	5

Final
1	(Slovenia) Blaž Kavčič	6	7
7	(Brazil) Júlio Silva	3	5

=== Top half ===
First round
1	(Slovenia) B Kavčič	6	1	6
(Argentina) M González	4	6	3
(Argentina) S Decoud	3	3
(Italy) M Crugnola	6	6
Q	(Italy) A Brizzi	6	6
(Australia) M Reid	4	3
Q	(Bosnia and Herzegovina) D Džumhur	6	6
8	(Colombia) C Salamanca	3	4
4	(Brazil) R Dutra da Silva	6	2	6
SE	(Brazil) R Hocevar	4	6	2
WC	(Brazil) Enrique Bogo	0	0
Q	(Argentina) G Andreozzi	6	6
(Argentina) A Velotti	2	2
(Czech Republic) I Minář	6	6
WC	(Brazil) T Fernandes	0	2
LL	(Croatia) D Marcan	6	6

Second round
1	(Slovenia) B Kavčič	6	7^{7}
(Italy) M Crugnola	3	6^{3}
Q	(Italy) A Brizzi	6	2	6
Q	(Bosnia and Herzegovina) D Džumhur	2	6	3
4	(Brazil) R Dutra da Silva	7	7
Q	(Argentina) G Andreozzi	5	5
(Czech Republic) I Minář	6	6
LL	(Croatia) D Marcan	2	4

Quarterfinals
1	(Slovenia) B Kavčič	6	6
Q	(Italy) A Brizzi	3	4
4	(Brazil) R Dutra da Silva	3	2
(Czech Republic) I Minář	6	6

Semifinals
1	(Slovenia) B Kavčič	6	6
(Czech Republic) I Minář	1	4

=== Bottom half ===
First round
7	(Brazil) J Silva	6	2	6
(Uruguay) M Felder	2	6	2
(Argentina) M Trungelliti	2	6	5
(Argentina) Nicolás Pastor	6	0	7
WC	(Brazil) F Romboli	6
(Serbia) N Ćirić	3^{r}
(Portugal) G Elias	5	6	7^{7}
3	(Brazil) R Mello	7	4	6^{1}
5	(Brazil) T Alves	6^{5}	6^{0}
(Argentina) P Galdón	7^{7}	7^{7}
(Australia) J Duckworth	7	4	6
WC	(Brazil) JP Sorgi	5	6	3
(Argentina) F Argüello	6^{4}	6	6
(Brazil) G Clezar	7^{7}	3	1
Q	(Brazil) L Kirche	4	6	6
2	(Chile) P Capdeville	6	1	4

Second round
7	(Brazil) J Silva	6	6
(Argentina) Nicolás Pastor	2	1
WC	(Brazil) F Romboli	2	3
(Portugal) G Elias	6	6
(Argentina) P Galdón	6^{5}	'7	1
(Australia) J Duckworth	7^{7}	5	6
(Argentina) F Argüello	6	5	6
Q	(Brazil) L Kirche	4	7	3

Quarterfinals
7	(Brazil) J Silva	6	0	6
(Portugal) G Elias	2	6	4
(Australia) J Duckworth	7	6
(Argentina) F Argüello	5	3

Semifinals
7	(Brazil) J Silva	1	6	7
(Australia) J Duckworth	6	1	5
