= 2014 São Paulo Challenger de Tênis – Doubles =

Doubles
- 2014 São Paulo Challenger de Tênis

Final
- Champions: (Argentina) Guido Pella (Argentina) Diego Sebastián Schwartzman
- Runners-up: (Argentina) Máximo González (Argentina) Andrés Molteni
- Score: 1-6, 6–3, [10-4]

Events
Singles	Doubles
← 2013 ·	São Paulo Challenger de Tênis	· 2015 →

Marcelo Demoliner and João Souza were the defending champions, but they decided not to play together. Demoliner played alongside Elias and Souza played alongside Sá.

Guido Pella and Diego Sebastián Schwartzman won the title, defeating Máximo González and Andrés Molteni in the final, 1-6, 6–3, [10-4].

== Seeds ==
1. (Uruguay) Ariel Behar / (Argentina) Horacio Zeballos (quarterfinals)
2. (Brazil) André Sá / (Brazil) João Souza (quarterfinals)
3. (Argentina) Máximo González / (Argentina) Andrés Molteni (final)
4. (Venezuela) Roberto Maytín / (Brazil) Fernando Romboli (quarterfinals)

== Draw ==
=== Key ===
- Q = Qualifier
- WC = Wild card
- LL = Lucky loser
- Alt = Alternate
- SE = Special exempt
- PR = Protected ranking
- ITF = ITF entry
- JE = Junior exempt
- w/o = Walkover
- r = Retired
- d = Defaulted
- SR = Special ranking

=== Draw ===
First round
1	(Uruguay) A Behar (Argentina) H Zeballos	6	6
WC	(Brazil) Felipe Carvalho (Brazil) Renato Lima	1	4
(Brazil) M Demoliner (Portugal) G Elias	6	6
WC	(Brazil) P Sakamoto (Brazil) JP Sorgi	2	1
4	(Venezuela) R Maytín (Brazil) F Romboli	4	6	[10]
(Brazil) RD da Silva (Brazil) T Monteiro	6	2	[7]
(Argentina) G Pella (Argentina) DS Schwartzman	6	6
PR	(Portugal) F Gil (France) A Michon	3	0
(Brazil) R Hocevar (Portugal) R Machado	6	6
(Peru) D Beretta (Argentina) JI Londero	0	4
(Italy) A Brizzi (Egypt) M Safwat	4	4
3	(Argentina) M González (Argentina) A Moltani	6	6
WC	(Brazil) A Ghem (Brazil) F Saretta	6	6^{6}	[7]
(Argentina) M Alund (Argentina) G Durán	2	7^{8}	[10]
(Serbia) N Ćirić (Serbia) G Tošić	1	3
2	(Brazil) A Sá (Brazil) J Souza	6	6

Quarterfinals
1	(Uruguay) A Behar (Argentina) H Zeballos	4	2
(Brazil) M Demoliner (Portugal) G Elias	6	6
4	(Venezuela) R Maytín (Brazil) F Romboli	3	3
(Argentina) G Pella (Argentina) DS Schwartzman	6	6
(Brazil) R Hocevar (Portugal) R Machado	6	4	[7]
3	(Argentina) M González (Argentina) A Moltani	4	6	[10]
(Argentina) M Alund (Argentina) G Durán	7^{8}	6^{5}	[10]
2	(Brazil) A Sá (Brazil) J Souza	6^{6}	7^{7}	[8]

Semifinals
(Brazil) M Demoliner (Portugal) G Elias	6^{4}	2
(Argentina) G Pella (Argentina) DS Schwartzman	7^{7}	6
3	(Argentina) M González (Argentina) A Moltani	7^{7}	4	[10]
(Argentina) M Alund (Argentina) G Durán	6^{5}	6	[6]

Final
(Argentina) G Pella (Argentina) DS Schwartzman	1	6	[10]
3	(Argentina) M González (Argentina) A Moltani	6	3	[4]
