= 2012 IS Open de Tênis – Doubles =

Doubles
- 2012 IS Open de Tênis

Final
- Champions: (Chile) Paul Capdeville (Uruguay) Marcel Felder
- Runners-up: (Brazil) André Ghem (Brazil) João Pedro Sorgi
- Score: 7–5, 6–3

Events
Singles	Doubles
- IS Open de Tênis

Paul Capdeville and Marcel Felder won the first edition of the tournament by defeating André Ghem and João Pedro Sorgi 7–5, 6–3 in the final.

== Seeds ==
1. (Chile) Paul Capdeville / (Uruguay) Marcel Felder (champions)
2. (Argentina) Guido Andreozzi / (Brazil) Fernando Romboli (semifinals)
3. (Croatia) Marin Draganja / (Croatia) Dino Marcan (quarterfinals)
4. (Brazil) Rodrigo Grilli / (Brazil) André Miele (first round)

== Draw ==
Key

- Q = Qualifier
- WC = Wild card
- LL = Lucky loser
- Alt = Alternate
- ITF = ITF entry
- PR = Protected ranking
- SR = Special ranking
- SE = Special exempt
- JE = Junior exempt
- JR = Junior Accelerator Programme entrant
- CO = College Accelerator Programme entrant
- NG = Next Gen Accelerator Program entrant
- w/o = Walkover
- r = Retired
- d = Defaulted

=== Draw ===
First round
1	(Chile) P Capdeville (Uruguay) M Felder	6	6
(Serbia) N Ćirić (Montenegro) G Tošić	1	0
(Argentina) M González (Argentina) Nicolás Pastor	6	6
(Uruguay) A Behar (Colombia) C Salamanca	2	4
3	(Croatia) M Draganja (Croatia) D Marcan	6	6
(Brazil) R Hocevar (Brazil) J Silva	3	2
(Bosnia and Herzegovina) D Džumhur (Slovenia) B Kavčič	7	6
WC	(Brazil) E Dischinger (Brazil) A Laranja	5	4
WC	(Brazil) A Ghem (Brazil) JP Sorgi	w/o
(Italy) M Crugnola (Argentina) S Decoud
(Brazil) T Alves (Brazil) F de Paula	7	6
4	(Brazil) Rodrigo Grilli (Brazil) A Miele	5	2
(Argentina) G Durán (Argentina) A Molteni	6	6
WC	(Brazil) L Kirche (Brazil) Osni Santos, Jr.	2	4
(Argentina) F Argüello (Argentina) A Velotti	6	1	[8]
2	(Argentina) G Andreozzi (Brazil) F Romboli	2	6	[10]

Quarterfinals
1	(Chile) P Capdeville (Uruguay) M Felder	6	6
(Argentina) M González (Argentina) Nicolás Pastor	1	3
3	(Croatia) M Draganja (Croatia) D Marcan	3	6	[7]
(Bosnia and Herzegovina) D Džumhur (Slovenia) B Kavčič	6	4	[10]
WC	(Brazil) A Ghem (Brazil) JP Sorgi	2	6	[10]
(Brazil) T Alves (Brazil) F de Paula	6	3	[5]
(Argentina) G Durán (Argentina) A Molteni
2	(Argentina) G Andreozzi (Brazil) F Romboli	w/o

Semifinals
1	(Chile) P Capdeville (Uruguay) M Felder	w/o
(Bosnia and Herzegovina) D Džumhur (Slovenia) B Kavčič
WC	(Brazil) A Ghem (Brazil) JP Sorgi	6^{2}	6	[13]
2	(Argentina) G Andreozzi (Brazil) F Romboli	7^{7}	2	[11]

Final
1	(Chile) P Capdeville (Uruguay) M Felder	7	6
WC	(Brazil) A Ghem (Brazil) JP Sorgi	5	3
