= 2013 IS Open de Tênis – Doubles =

Doubles
- 2013 IS Open de Tênis

Final
- Champions: (Brazil) Marcelo Demoliner (Brazil) João Souza
- Runners-up: (United States) James Cerretani (France) Pierre-Hugues Herbert
- Score: 6–2, 4–6, [10–6]

Events
| Singles | Doubles |
- IS Open de Tênis

Paul Capdeville and Marcel Felder were the defending champions but Felder decided not to participate.
Capdeville played alongside Hans Podlipnik-Castillo, but they withdrawn after the first round.
Marcelo Demoliner and João Souza defeated James Cerretani and Pierre-Hugues Herbert 6–2, 4–6, [10–6] in the final to win the title.

== Seeds ==
1. (Brazil) Marcelo Demoliner / (Brazil) João Souza (champions)
2. (United States) James Cerretani / (France) Pierre-Hugues Herbert (final)
3. (Croatia) Nikola Mektić / (Croatia) Antonio Veić (first round)
4. (Argentina) Guillermo Durán / (Argentina) Renzo Olivo (semifinals)

== Draw ==
Key

- Q = Qualifier
- WC = Wild card
- LL = Lucky loser
- Alt = Alternate
- ITF = ITF entry
- PR = Protected ranking
- SR = Special ranking
- SE = Special exempt
- JE = Junior exempt
- JR = Junior Accelerator Programme entrant
- CO = College Accelerator Programme entrant
- NG = Next Gen Accelerator Program entrant
- w/o = Walkover
- r = Retired
- d = Defaulted

=== Draw ===
First round
1 | (Brazil) M Demoliner (Brazil) J Souza | 6 | 6
(Tunisia) M Jaziri (Czech Republic) D Lojda | 3 | 4
WC | (Brazil) R Dutra da Silva (Brazil) E Russi | 3 | 2
WC | (Brazil) F de Paula (Brazil) J Silva | 6 | 6
3 | (Croatia) N Mektić (Croatia) A Veić | 4 | 0
(Chile) P Capdeville (Chile) H Podlipnik-Castillo | 6 | 6
(Brazil) A Ghem (United States) D Kosakowski | 6 | 6
(Brazil) G Clezar (Portugal) G Elias | 3 | 1
(Argentina) D Junqueira (Argentina) E Schwank | 2 | 1
WC | (Brazil) T Alves (Brazil) A Laranja | 6 | 6
(Brazil) R Hocevar (Brazil) L Kirche | 3 | 6^{3}
4 | (Argentina) G Durán (Argentina) R Olivo | 6 | 7^{7}
(Slovakia) P Červenák (Italy) M Viola | 2 | 2
(Argentina) G Andreozzi (Uruguay) A Behar | 6 | 6
(Serbia) B Pašanski (Bosnia and Herzegovina) A Šetkić | 1 | 3
2 | (United States) J Cerretani (France) P-H Herbert | 6 | 6

Quarterfinals
1 | (Brazil) M Demoliner (Brazil) J Souza | 6 | 7^{9}
WC | (Brazil) F de Paula (Brazil) J Silva | 2 | 6^{7}
(Chile) P Capdeville (Chile) H Podlipnik-Castillo
(Brazil) A Ghem (United States) D Kosakowski | w/o
WC | (Brazil) T Alves (Brazil) A Laranja | 2 | 5
4 | (Argentina) G Durán (Argentina) R Olivo | 6 | 7
(Argentina) G Andreozzi (Uruguay) A Behar
2 | (United States) J Cerretani (France) P-H Herbert | w/o

Semifinals
1 | (Brazil) M Demoliner (Brazil) J Souza | w/o
(Brazil) A Ghem (United States) D Kosakowski
4 | (Argentina) G Durán (Argentina) R Olivo | 3 | 6^{4}
2 | (United States) J Cerretani (France) P-H Herbert | 6 | 7^{7}

Final
1 | (Brazil) M Demoliner (Brazil) J Souza | 6 | 3 | [10]
2 | (United States) J Cerretani (France) P-H Herbert | 4 | 6 | [6]
