= 2013 IS Open de Tênis =

- Date: 22–28 April
- Edition: 2nd
- Draw: 32S / 16D
- Prize money: $50,000
- Surface: Clay
- Location: São Paulo, Brazil

Champions

Singles
- (Chile) Paul Capdeville

Doubles
- (Brazil) Marcelo Demoliner / (Brazil) João Souza
| ← 2012 · | IS Open de Tênis | · 2015 → |

The 2013 IS Open de Tênis was a professional tennis tournament played on clay courts. It was the second edition of the tournament which was part of the 2013 ATP Challenger Tour. It took place in São Paulo, Brazil, on 22–28 April 2013.

== Singles entrants ==
=== Seeds ===
| Country | Player | Rank^{1} | Seed |
|---|---|---|---|
| BRA | Rogério Dutra Silva | 97 | 1 |
| BRA | João Souza | 114 | 2 |
| ITA | Matteo Viola | 126 | 3 |
| POR | Gastão Elias | 133 | 4 |
| ARG | Guido Andreozzi | 165 | 5 |
| TUN | Malek Jaziri | 168 | 6 |
| CHI | Paul Capdeville | 169 | 7 |
| CRO | Antonio Veić | 170 | 8 |

- ^{1} Rankings as of 15 April 2013

=== Other entrants ===
The following players received wildcards into the singles main draw:

- (Uruguay) Pablo Cuevas
- (Brazil) Marcelo Demoliner
- (Brazil) Ricardo Hocevar
- (Brazil) Júlio Silva

The following players received entry as an alternate into the singles main draw:

- (Slovakia) Jozef Kovalík
- (Argentina) Eduardo Schwank

The following players received entry from the qualifying draw:

- (Argentina) Pablo Galdón
- (Argentina) Máximo González
- (Czech Republic) Dušan Lojda
- (Portugal) Rui Machado

== Doubles entrants ==
=== Seeds ===
| Country | Player | Country | Player | Rank^{1} | Seed |
|---|---|---|---|---|---|
| BRA | Marcelo Demoliner | BRA | João Souza | 190 | 1 |
| USA | James Cerretani | FRA | Pierre-Hugues Herbert | 266 | 2 |
| CRO | Nikola Mektić | CRO | Antonio Veić | 349 | 3 |
| ARG | Guillermo Durán | ARG | Renzo Olivo | 488 | 4 |

- ^{1} Rankings as of 15 April 2013

=== Other entrants ===
The following pairs received wildcards into the doubles main draw:

- (Brazil) Thiago Alves / (Brazil) Augusto Laranja
- (Brazil) Fabiano de Paula / (Brazil) Júlio Silva
- (Brazil) Rogério Dutra Silva / (Brazil) Eduardo Russi

== Champions ==
=== Singles ===
- (Chile) Paul Capdeville def. (Argentina) Renzo Olivo 6–2, 6–2

=== Doubles ===
- (Brazil) Marcelo Demoliner / (Brazil) João Souza def. (United States) James Cerretani / (France) Pierre-Hugues Herbert 6–2, 4–6, [10–6]
