= 2015 São Paulo Challenger de Tênis – Doubles =

Doubles
- 2015 São Paulo Challenger de Tênis

Final
- Champions: (United States) Chase Buchanan; (Slovenia) Blaž Rola
- Runners-up: (Argentina) Guido Andreozzi; (Peru) Sergio Galdós
- Score: 6–4, 6–4

Events
| Singles | Doubles |
| ← 2014 · | São Paulo Challenger de Tênis | · 2016 → |

Guido Pella and Diego Schwartzman were the defending champions, but Schwartzman decided not to participate this year. Pella played alongside Andrés Molteni, but they lost to Guido Andreozzi and Sergio Galdós in the semifinals.

== Seeds ==
1. (Argentina) Máximo González / (Venezuela) Roberto Maytín (quarterfinals)
2. (Argentina) Andrés Molteni / (Argentina) Guido Pella (semifinals)
3. (Brazil) Marcelo Demoliner / (Mexico) Miguel Ángel Reyes-Varela (semifinals)
4. (Argentina) Guido Andreozzi / (Peru) Sergio Galdós (final)

== Draw ==
=== Key ===
- Q = Qualifier
- WC = Wild card
- LL = Lucky loser
- Alt = Alternate
- SE = Special exempt
- PR = Protected ranking
- ITF = ITF entry
- JE = Junior exempt
- w/o = Walkover
- r = Retired
- d = Defaulted
- SR = Special ranking

First round

Quarterfinals

Semifinals

Final

1
- (Argentina) M González
- (Venezuela) R Maytín
6
6

- (Republic of Ireland) J Cluskey
- (Republic of Ireland) D O'Hare
4
4

1
- (Argentina) M González
- (Venezuela) R Maytín
3
4

- (Argentina) N Kicker
- (Sweden) C Lindell
6
2
[7]

- (United States) C Buchanan
- (Slovenia) B Rola
6
6

- (United States) C Buchanan
- (Slovenia) B Rola
4
6
[10]

- (United States) C Buchanan
- (Slovenia) B Rola
6
7^{7}

3
- (Brazil) M Demoliner
- (Mexico) MA Reyes-Varela
6
6

3
- (Brazil) M Demoliner
- (Mexico) MA Reyes-Varela
3
6^{5}

WC
- (Brazil) R Dutra Silva
- (Brazil) A Ghem
3
1

3
- (Brazil) M Demoliner
- (Mexico) MA Reyes-Varela
6
6

- (Belgium) J Cagnina
- (Belgium) G Gigounon
6
6

- (Belgium) J Cagnina
- (Belgium) G Gigounon
1
2

WC
(Brazil) Rodrigo Carvalho
(Brazil) Diego Padilha
2
1

- (United States) C Buchanan
- (Slovenia) B Rola
6
6

- (France) A Michon
- (France) G Mina
6
6

4
- (Argentina) G Andreozzi
- (Peru) S Galdós
4
4

WC
(Brazil) Felipe Carvalho
(Brazil) Tiago Lopes
4
3

- (France) A Michon
- (France) G Mina
5
3

- (Chile) N Jarry
- (Chile) G Lama
5
2

4
- (Argentina) G Andreozzi
- (Peru) S Galdós
7
6

4
- (Argentina) G Andreozzi
- (Peru) S Galdós
7
6

4
- (Argentina) G Andreozzi
- (Peru) S Galdós
6^{4}
6
[10]

- (France) Jules Marie
- (France) A Musialek
w/o

2
- (Argentina) A Molteni
- (Argentina) G Pella
7^{7}
4
[5]

Alt
- (Argentina) F Coria
- (Argentina) T Lipovšek Puches

- (France) J Marie
- (France) A Musialek

- (Brazil) G Clezar
- (Brazil) F de Paula
6^{9}
2

2
- (Argentina) A Molteni
- (Argentina) G Pella
w/o

2
- (Argentina) A Molteni
- (Argentina) G Pella
7^{11}
6
