= 2013 São Paulo Challenger de Tênis – Men's doubles =

Men's doubles
- 2013 São Paulo Challenger de Tênis

Final
- Champions: (Brazil) Fernando Romboli (Argentina) Eduardo Schwank
- Runners-up: (El Salvador) Marcelo Arévalo (Colombia) Nicolás Barrientos
- Score: 6–7^{(6–8)}, 6–4, [10–8]

Events
Singles	men	women
Doubles	men	women
← 2012 ·	São Paulo Challenger de Tênis	· 2014 →

This was the first edition of the tournament.

Fernando Romboli and Eduardo Schwank won in the final against Marcelo Arévalo and Nicolás Barrientos 6–7^{(6–8)}, 6–4, [10–8]

== Seeds ==
1. (Brazil) Marcelo Demoliner / (Brazil) João Souza (quarterfinals)
2. (Brazil) Guilherme Clezar / (Brazil) Fabiano de Paula (semifinals)
3. (El Salvador) Marcelo Arévalo / (Colombia) Nicolás Barrientos (final)
4. (Brazil) André Miele / (Brazil) João Pedro Sorgi (first round)

== Draw ==
=== Key ===
- Q = Qualifier
- WC = Wild card
- LL = Lucky loser
- Alt = Alternate
- SE = Special exempt
- PR = Protected ranking
- ITF = ITF entry
- JE = Junior exempt
- w/o = Walkover
- r = Retired
- d = Defaulted
- SR = Special ranking

=== Draw ===
First round
1	(Brazil) M Demoliner (Brazil) J Souza	6	6
(Chile) C Garín (Chile) G Lama	2	2
(Sweden) C Lindell (Brazil) Carlos Eduardo Severino	4	2
(Brazil) F Romboli (Argentina) E Schwank	6	6
4	(Brazil) A Miele (Brazil) JP Sorgi	0	2
(Argentina) G Andreozzi (Argentina) A Velotti	6	6
(Argentina) Leandro Migani (Argentina) A Molteni	6	6
(Chile) P Capdeville (Argentina) A Schneiter	2	1
(Brazil) T Fernandes (Brazil) B Sant'Anna	6	6
WC	(Brazil) Marcelo Tebet Filho (Brazil) Leonardo Telles	4	2
WC	(Brazil) Bruno Semenzato (Brazil) Fernando Yamacita	4	1
3	(El Salvador) M Arévalo (Colombia) N Barrientos	6	6
(Brazil) R Hocevar (Brazil) Tiago Lopes	3	5
(Dominican Republic) J Hernández (Slovenia) B Rola	6	7
(Ecuador) JC Campozano (Ecuador) E Gómez	4	7^{7}	[8]
2	(Brazil) G Clezar (Brazil) F de Paula	6	6^{4}	[10]

Quarterfinals
1	(Brazil) M Demoliner (Brazil) J Souza	6	3	[8]
(Brazil) F Romboli (Argentina) E Schwank	0	6	[10]
(Argentina) G Andreozzi (Argentina) A Velotti	6	6
(Argentina) L Migani (Argentina) A Molteni	2	2
(Brazil) T Fernandes (Brazil) B Sant'Anna	4	1
(El Salvador) M Arévalo (Colombia) N Barrientos	6	6
(Dominican Republic) J Hernández (Slovenia) B Rola	2	4
2	(Brazil) G Clezar (Brazil) F de Paula	6	6

Semifinals
(Brazil) F Romboli (Argentina) E Schwank	6	7^{7}
(Argentina) G Andreozzi (Argentina) A Velotti	2	6^{3}
2	(El Salvador) M Arévalo (Colombia) N Barrientos	6^{5}	3
2	(Brazil) G Clezar (Brazil) F de Paula	7^{7}	6

Final
(Brazil) F Romboli (Argentina) E Schwank	6^{6}	6	[10]
(El Salvador) M Arévalo (Colombia) N Barrientos	7^{8}	4	[8]
