= 2013 IS Open – Doubles =

Doubles
- 2013 IS Open

Final
- Champions: (Moldova) Roman Borvanov (New Zealand) Artem Sitak
- Runners-up: (Peru) Sergio Galdós (Argentina) Guido Pella
- Score: 6–4, 7–6^{(7–3)}

Events
Singles	Doubles
IS Open

This was the first edition of the event.

Roman Borvanov and Artem Sitak won the title defeating Sergio Galdós and Guido Pella in the final, 6–4, 7–6^{(7–3)}.

== Seeds ==
1. (Brazil) Marcelo Demoliner / (Brazil) João Souza (first round)
2. (Moldova) Roman Borvanov / (New Zealand) Artem Sitak (champions)
3. (Colombia) Alejandro González / (Argentina) Eduardo Schwank (semifinals)
4. (Brazil) Guilherme Clezar / (Brazil) André Ghem (first round)

== Draw ==
=== Key ===
- Q = Qualifier
- WC = Wild card
- LL = Lucky loser
- Alt = Alternate
- SE = Special exempt
- PR = Protected ranking
- ITF = ITF entry
- JE = Junior exempt
- w/o = Walkover
- r = Retired
- d = Defaulted
- SR = Special ranking

=== Draw ===
First round
1	(Brazil) M Demoliner (Brazil) J Souza	3	6	[8]
WC	(Brazil) R Hocevar (Brazil) L Kirche	6	0	[10]
(Peru) S Galdós (Argentina) G Pella	6	6
(United States) A Kuznetsov (Portugal) R Machado	3	4
4	(Brazil) G Clezar (Brazil) A Ghem	6	3	[7]
WC	(Brazil) T Alves (Brazil) T Monteiro	1	6	[10]
(Argentina) F Argüello (Argentina) Patricio Heras	6	2	[10]
(Portugal) G Elias (Portugal) P Sousa	3	6	[6]
(Argentina) M Alund (Venezuela) D Souto	4	7	[10]
(Slovenia) B Kavčič (Croatia) A Veić	6	5	[4]
(Argentina) G Durán (Argentina) M González	3	0
3	(Colombia) A González (Argentina) E Schwank	6	6
(Brazil) D Dutra da Silva (Brazil) R Dutra da Silva	7	6
(Dominican Republic) V Estrella Burgos (Dominican Republic) J Hernández	5	1
WC	(Brazil) Tiago Lopes (Brazil) C Zampieri	2	1
2	(Moldova) R Borvanov (New Zealand) A Sitak	6	6

Quarterfinals
WC	(Brazil) R Hocevar (Brazil) L Kirche	2	4
(Peru) S Galdós (Argentina) G Pella	6	6
WC	(Brazil) T Alves (Brazil) T Monteiro	3	6	[10]
(Argentina) F Argüello (Argentina) Patricio Heras	6	2	[8]
(Argentina) M Alund (Venezuela) D Souto	1	3
3	(Colombia) A González (Argentina) E Schwank	6	6
(Brazil) D Dutra da Silva (Brazil) R Dutra da Silva
2	(Moldova) R Borvanov (New Zealand) A Sitak	w/o

Semifinals
(Peru) S Galdós (Argentina) G Pella	6	6
WC	(Brazil) T Alves (Brazil) T Monteiro	3	3
3	(Colombia) A González (Argentina) E Schwank	6	5	[4]
2	(Moldova) R Borvanov (New Zealand) A Sitak	3	7	[10]

Final
(Peru) S Galdós (Argentina) G Pella	4	6^{3}
2	(Moldova) R Borvanov (New Zealand) A Sitak	6	7^{7}
