= 2013 São Paulo Challenger de Tênis =

- Date: 29 July – 4 August
- Edition: 1st
- Category: ATP Challenger Tour (men); ITF Women's Circuit (women)
- Prize money: $50,000 (men) $10,000 (women)
- Surface: Clay
- Location: São Paulo, Brazil

Champions

Men's singles
- (Colombia) Alejandro González

Women's singles
- (Peru) Bianca Botto

Men's doubles
- (Brazil) Fernando Romboli / (Argentina) Eduardo Schwank

Women's doubles
- (Brazil) Laura Pigossi / (Argentina) Carolina Zeballos
São Paulo Challenger de Tênis	· 2014 →

The 2013 São Paulo Challenger de Tênis was a professional tennis tournament played on outdoor clay courts. It was the first edition of the tournament which was part of the 2013 ATP Challenger Tour and the 2013 ITF Women's Circuit, offering $50,000 in prize money for the men's event and $10,000 for the women's event. It took place in São Paulo, Brazil, on 29 July – 4 August 2013.

== Men's entrants ==
=== Seeds ===
Country	Player	Rank^{1}	Seed
BRA	João Souza	122	1
CHI	Paul Capdeville	142	2
COL	Alejandro González	160	3
ARG	Guido Andreozzi	177	4
BRA	Guilherme Clezar	216	5
BRA	Fabiano de Paula	222	6
ARG	Agustín Velotti	229	7
ARG	Marco Trungelliti	266	8

- ^{1} Rankings as of 22 July 2013

=== Other entrants ===
The following players received wildcards into the singles main draw:

- (Brazil) Marcelo Demoliner
- (Brazil) Tiago Fernandes
- (Brazil) Fernando Romboli
- (Brazil) Carlos Eduardo Severino

The following player received entry with a protected ranking:

- (Argentina) Eduardo Schwank

The following players received entry as alternates:

- (Chile) Gonzalo Lama
- (Brazil) Tiago Lopes

The following players received entry from the qualifying draw:

- (Chile) Christian Garín
- (Sweden) Christian Lindell
- (Brazil) Alexandre Schnitman
- (Brazil) Bruno Semenzato

The following player received entry into the singles main draw as a lucky loser:

- (Brazil) Marcelo Tebet Filho

== Women's entrants ==
=== Seeds ===
Country	Player	Rank^{1}	Seed
CHI	Fernanda Brito	380	1
ARG	Carolina Zeballos	404	2
BRA	Laura Pigossi	417	3
BRA	Ana Clara Duarte	438	4
BRA	Gabriela Cé	444	5
ARG	~~Andrea Benítez~~	452	6
BRA	Eduarda Piai	445	7
ARG	Victoria Bosio	502	8

- ^{1} Rankings as of 22 July 2013

=== Other entrants ===
The following players received wildcards into the singles main draw:

- (Brazil) Suellen Abel
- (Brazil) Maria Vitória Beirão
- (Brazil) Leticia Nayara Moura Monteiro
- (Brazil) Maria Silva

The following players received entry from the qualifying draw:

- (Brazil) Marcela Alves Pereira Valle
- (Argentina) Carla Bruzzesi Avella
- (Brazil) Juliana Rocha Cardoso
- (Paraguay) Gabriela Ferreira Sanabria
- (Brazil) Leticia Garcia Vidal
- (Brazil) Barbara Gueno
- (Brazil) Barbara Oliveira
- (Brazil) Luisa Stefani

The following player received entry into the singles main draw as a lucky loser:

- (Brazil) Marcela Guimarães Bueno

== Champions ==
=== Men's singles ===
- (Colombia) Alejandro González def. (Argentina) Eduardo Schwank 6–2, 6–3

=== Women's singles ===
- (Peru) Bianca Botto def. (Brazil) Gabriela Cé 7–6^{(7–2)}, 5–7, 6–2

=== Men's doubles ===
- (Brazil) Fernando Romboli / (Argentina) Eduardo Schwank def. (El Salvador) Marcelo Arévalo / (Colombia) Nicolás Barrientos 6–7^{(6–8)}, 6–4, [10–8]

=== Women's doubles ===
- (Brazil) Laura Pigossi / (Argentina) Carolina Zeballos def. (Brazil) Nathália Rossi / (Brazil) Luisa Stefani 6–3, 6–4
