= 2013 IS Open de Tênis – Singles =

Singles
- 2013 IS Open de Tênis

Final
- Champion: (Chile) Paul Capdeville
- Runner-up: (Argentina) Renzo Olivo
- Score: 6–2, 6–2

Events
Singles	Doubles
← 2012 ·	IS Open de Tênis	· 2014 →

Blaž Kavčič was the defending champion, but has chosen not to compete.
Paul Capdeville won the final 6–2, 6–2 against Renzo Olivo.

== Seeds ==
1. (Brazil) Rogério Dutra da Silva (quarterfinals)
2. (Brazil) João Souza (second round)
3. (Italy) Matteo Viola (first round, retired)
4. (Portugal) Gastão Elias (first round)
5. (Argentina) Guido Andreozzi (second round, withdrew)
6. (Tunisia) Malek Jaziri (quarterfinals)
7. (Chile) Paul Capdeville (champion)
8. (Croatia) Antonio Veić (second round)

== Draw ==
=== Key ===
- Q = Qualifier
- WC = Wild card
- LL = Lucky loser
- Alt = Alternate
- SE = Special exempt
- PR = Protected ranking
- ITF = ITF entry
- JE = Junior exempt
- w/o = Walkover
- r = Retired
- d = Defaulted
- SR = Special ranking

=== Finals ===
Semifinals
7	(Chile) Paul Capdeville	5	6	7^{7}
Q	(Argentina) Máximo González	7	4	6^{3}
(Argentina) Renzo Olivo	4	7	7
(Brazil) Guilherme Clezar	6	5	5

Final
7	(Chile) Paul Capdeville	6	6
(Argentina) Renzo Olivo	2	2

=== Top half ===
First round
1	(Brazil) R Dutra da Silva	6	7
(Argentina) M Trungelliti	1	5
WC	(Brazil) R Hocevar	1	6^{5}
WC	(Brazil) M Demoliner	6	7^{7}
(Brazil) T Alves	6^{3}	1
WC	(Brazil) J Silva	7^{7}	6
(Serbia) B Pašanski	3	6	5
7	(Chile) P Capdeville	6	4	7
3	(Italy) M Viola	7	1^{r}
(Slovakia) P Červenák	5	3
(Croatia) N Mektić	5	4
Q	(Argentina) M González	7	6
Q	(Argentina) P Galdón	7	6
Alt	(Argentina) E Schwank	5	2
(Brazil) L Kirche	2	6^{4}
6	(Tunisia) M Jaziri	6	7^{7}

Second round
1	(Brazil) R Dutra da Silva	7	6
WC	(Brazil) M Demoliner	5	2
WC	(Brazil) J Silva	3	2
7	(Chile) P Capdeville	6	6
(Slovakia) P Červenák	7	3	3
Q	(Argentina) M González	5	6	6
Q	(Argentina) P Galdón	3	6^{3}
6	(Tunisia) M Jaziri	6	7^{7}

Quarterfinals
1	(Brazil) R Dutra da Silva	6^{4}	6^{6}
7	(Chile) P Capdeville	7^{7}	7^{8}
Q	(Argentina) M González	1	6	6
6	(Tunisia) M Jaziri	6	0	4

Semifinals
7	(Chile) P Capdeville	5	6	7^{7}
Q	(Argentina) M González	7	4	6^{3}

=== Bottom half ===
First round
5	(Argentina) G Andreozzi	6	6
(Bosnia and Herzegovina) A Šetkić	2	1
Q	(Portugal) R Machado	4	7	2
(Argentina) R Olivo	6	5	6
(Argentina) A Velotti	3	2
WC	(Uruguay) P Cuevas	6	6
Alt	(Slovakia) J Kovalík	6^{3}	7	6
4	(Portugal) G Elias	7^{7}	5	3
8	(Croatia) A Veić	4	6	6
(Brazil) F de Paula	6	1	4
Q	(Czech Republic) D Lojda	7^{7}	6
(Australia) J Duckworth	6^{3}	4
(France) P-H Herbert	1	6^{3}
(Brazil) G Clezar	6	7^{7}
(United States) D Kosakowski	6^{0}	2
2	(Brazil) J Souza	7^{7}	6

Second round
5	(Argentina) G Andreozzi
(Argentina) R Olivo	w/o
WC	(Uruguay) P Cuevas	6	6
Alt	(Slovakia) J Kovalík	2	4
8	(Croatia) A Veić	3	3
Q	(Czech Republic) D Lojda	6	6
(Brazil) G Clezar	3	7	6
2	(Brazil) J Souza	6	5	1

Quarterfinals
(Argentina) R Olivo	6^{2}	6	6
WC	(Uruguay) P Cuevas	7^{7}	4	4
Q	(Czech Republic) D Lojda	4	4
(Brazil) G Clezar	6	6

Semifinals
(Argentina) R Olivo	4	7	7
(Brazil) G Clezar	6	5	5
