= 2013 IS Open – Singles =

Singles
- 2013 IS Open

Final
- Champion: (Argentina) Guido Pella
- Runner-up: (Argentina) Facundo Argüello
- Score: 6–1, 6–0

Events
Singles	Doubles
IS Open

This was the first edition of the event.

Guido Pella won the title defeating Facundo Argüello in the final, 6–1, 6–0.

== Seeds ==
1. (Slovenia) Blaž Kavčič (quarterfinals)
2. (Colombia) Alejandro González (second round)
3. (Netherlands) Thiemo de Bakker (first round)
4. (Argentina) Guido Pella (champion)
5. (Russia) Andrey Kuznetsov (first round)
6. (Argentina) Martín Alund (second round)
7. (Portugal) Gastão Elias (first round)
8. (Brazil) Rogério Dutra da Silva (semifinals)

== Draw ==
=== Key ===
- Q = Qualifier
- WC = Wild card
- LL = Lucky loser
- Alt = Alternate
- SE = Special exempt
- PR = Protected ranking
- ITF = ITF entry
- JE = Junior exempt
- w/o = Walkover
- r = Retired
- d = Defaulted
- SR = Special ranking

=== Finals ===
Semifinals
8	(Brazil) Rogério Dutra da Silva	6^{1}	2
(Argentina) Facundo Argüello	7^{7}	6
4	(Argentina) Guido Pella	6	4	6
(Portugal) Pedro Sousa	2	6	1

Final
(Argentina) Facundo Argüello	1	0
4	(Argentina) Guido Pella	6	6

=== Top half ===
First round
1	(Slovenia) B Kavčič	6	4	6
(Brazil) G Clezar	3	6	3
WC	(Brazil) D Dutra da Silva	6	4	1
WC	(Brazil) Tiago Lopes	2	6	6
(Argentina) M González	7^{7}	6
Q	(Brazil) M Demoliner	6^{2}	4
(Brazil) T Alves	3	2
8	(Brazil) R Dutra da Silva	6	6
3	(Netherlands) T de Bakker	6	3	2
(Argentina) F Argüello	4	6	6
Q	(New Zealand) A Sitak	6^{2}	6	6
Q	(United States) B Fratangelo	7^{7}	2	3
(Brazil) J Souza	6	6
(Argentina) E Schwank	3	2
WC	(Brazil) L Kirche	3	1
6	(Argentina) M Alund	6	6

Second round
1	(Slovenia) B Kavčič	6	6
WC	(Brazil) T Lopes	4	2
(Argentina) M González	2^{r}
8	(Brazil) R Dutra da Silva	4
(Argentina) F Argüello	6	6
Q	(New Zealand) A Sitak	4	2
(Brazil) J Souza	6	7^{7}
6	(Argentina) M Alund	4	6^{5}

Quarterfinals
1	(Slovenia) B Kavčič	3	1
8	(Brazil) R Dutra da Silva	6	6
(Argentina) F Argüello	6	6
(Brazil) J Souza	3	2

Semifinals
8	(Brazil) R Dutra da Silva	6^{1}	2
(Argentina) F Argüello	7^{7}	6

=== Bottom half ===
First round
7	(Portugal) G Elias	3	2
WC	(Brazil) T Monteiro	6	6
(Brazil) A Ghem	6	3	6
(Venezuela) D Souto	2	6	3
(Chile) P Capdeville	6	6
Q	(Brazil) P Sakamoto	1	2
(Argentina) Patricio Heras	3	1
4	(Argentina) G Pella	6	6
5	(Russia) A Kuznetsov	6	3	1
(Dominican Republic) V Estrella Burgos	4	6	6
(Colombia) C Salamanca	6^{3}	0
(Croatia) A Veić	7^{7}	6
(Portugal) P Sousa	7^{7}	1	6
(Colombia) N Barrientos	6^{5}	6	1
(Brazil) R Hocevar	3	3
2	(Colombia) A González	6	6

Second round
WC	(Brazil) T Monteiro	2	7^{7}	7^{7}
(Brazil) A Ghem	6	6^{5}	6^{5}
(Chile) P Capdeville	4	4
4	(Argentina) G Pella	6	6
(Dominican Republic) V Estrella Burgos	6	6^{3}	1
(Croatia) A Veić	3	7^{7}	6
(Portugal) P Sousa	6	6
2	(Colombia) A González	2	3

Quarterfinals
WC	(Brazil) T Monteiro	1	1
4	(Argentina) G Pella	6	6
(Croatia) A Veić	2	1
(Portugal) P Sousa	6	6

Semifinals
4	(Argentina) G Pella	6	4	6
(Portugal) P Sousa	2	6	1
