= 2013 São Paulo Challenger de Tênis – Men's singles =

Men's singles
- 2013 São Paulo Challenger de Tênis

Final
- Champion: (Colombia) Alejandro González
- Runner-up: (Argentina) Eduardo Schwank
- Score: 6–2, 6–3

Events
Singles	men	women
Doubles	men	women
São Paulo Challenger de Tênis	· 2014 →

This was the first edition of the event.

Alejandro González won the title, defeating Eduardo Schwank in the final, 6–2, 6–3.

== Seeds ==
1. (Brazil) João Souza (quarterfinals)
2. (Chile) Paul Capdeville (quarterfinals)
3. (Colombia) Alejandro González (champion)
4. (Argentina) Guido Andreozzi (second round)
5. (Brazil) Guilherme Clezar (second round)
6. (Brazil) Fabiano de Paula (first round)
7. (Argentina) Agustín Velotti (quarterfinals)
8. (Argentina) Marco Trungelliti (quarterfinals)

== Draw ==
=== Key ===
- Q = Qualifier
- WC = Wild card
- LL = Lucky loser
- Alt = Alternate
- SE = Special exempt
- PR = Protected ranking
- ITF = ITF entry
- JE = Junior exempt
- w/o = Walkover
- r = Retired
- d = Defaulted
- SR = Special ranking

=== Finals ===
Semifinals
(Slovenia) Blaž Rola	4	6	3
3	(Colombia) Alejandro González	6	3	6
PR	(Argentina) Eduardo Schwank	6	7^{7}
(Dominican Republic) José Hernández	1	6^{4}

Final
3	(Colombia) Alejandro González	6	6
PR	(Argentina) Eduardo Schwank	2	3

=== Top half ===
First round
1	(Brazil) J Souza	6	7^{7}
(El Salvador) M Arévalo	3	6^{5}
(Brazil) JP Sorgi	3	0
Q	(Chile) C Garín	6	6
(Slovenia) B Rola	6	6
Alt	(Chile) G Lama	3	2
LL	(Brazil) Marcelo Tebet Filho	2	0
5	(Brazil) G Clezar	6	6
3	(Colombia) A González	7^{7}	6
(Ecuador) E Gómez	6^{3}	3
(Argentina) Leandro Migani	7	6
WC	(Brazil) Carlos Eduardo Severino	5	4
(Ecuador) JC Campozano	6	2	6
Q	(Sweden) C Lindell	1	6	4
(Brazil) A Miele	7	0	3
7	(Argentina) A Velotti	5	6	6

Second round
1	(Brazil) J Souza	6	6
Q	(Chile) C Garín	3	2
(Slovenia) B Rola	6	6
5	(Brazil) G Clezar	3	4
3	(Colombia) A González	6	7^{7}
(Argentina) L Migani	3	6^{2}
(Ecuador) JC Campozano	6	2	6^{3}
7	(Argentina) A Velotti	4	6	7^{7}

Quarterfinals
1	(Brazil) J Souza	3	4
(Slovenia) B Rola	6	6
3	(Colombia) A González	6	6
7	(Argentina) A Velotti	2	2

Semifinals
(Slovenia) B Rola	4	6	3
3	(Colombia) A González	6	3	6

=== Bottom half ===
First round
8	(Argentina) M Trungelliti	7	4	6
(Colombia) N Barrientos	6^{2}	6	4
(Argentina) A Molteni	6	6
Q	(Brazil) Bruno Semenzato	3	1
Alt	(Brazil) Tiago Lopes	6^{1}	4
PR	(Argentina) E Schwank	7^{7}	6
WC	(Brazil) M Demoliner	3	2
4	(Argentina) G Andreozzi	6	6
6	(Brazil) F de Paula	6	2	4
(Brazil) T Fernandes	2	6	6
WC	(Brazil) F Romboli	6	4	6^{4}
(Dominican Republic) J Hernández	3	6	7^{7}
(Brazil) R Hocevar	4	7^{7}	7
(Brazil) B Sant'anna	6	6^{5}	5
Q	(Brazil) Alexandre Schnitman	0	2
2	(Chile) P Capdeville	6	6

Second round
8	(Argentina) M Trungelliti	6	3	6
(Argentina) A Molteni	3	6	3
PR	(Argentina) E Schwank	7	6
4	(Argentina) G Andreozzi	5	2
(Brazil) T Fernandes	3	1
(Dominican Republic) J Hernández	6	6
(Brazil) R Hocevar	2	3
2	(Chile) P Capdeville	6	6

Quarterfinals
8	(Argentina) M Trungelliti	2	1
PR	(Argentina) E Schwank	6	6
(Dominican Republic) J Hernández	2	6	6
2	(Chile) P Capdeville	6	1	3

Semifinals
PR	(Argentina) E Schwank	6	7^{7}
(Dominican Republic) J Hernández	1	6^{4}
