= 2017 São Paulo Challenger de Tênis – Doubles =

Doubles
- 2017 São Paulo Challenger de Tênis

Final
- Champions: (Argentina) Máximo González; (Brazil) Fabrício Neis
- Runners-up: (Portugal) Gastão Elias; (Brazil) José Pereira
- Score: 6–1, 6–1

Events
Singles	Doubles
- São Paulo Challenger de Tênis

Fabrício Neis and Caio Zampieri were the defending champions but only Neis chose to defend his title, partnering Máximo González. Neis successfully defended his title.

González and Neis won the title after defeating Gastão Elias and José Pereira 6–1, 6–1 in the final.

== Seeds ==
1. (Uruguay) Ariel Behar / (Brazil) Fabiano de Paula (first round)
2. (Argentina) Máximo González / (Brazil) Fabrício Neis (champions)
3. (Argentina) Federico Coria / (Argentina) Tomás Lipovšek Puches (semifinals)
4. (Argentina) Juan Ignacio Londero / (Brazil) João Souza (first round, withdrew)

== Draw ==
Key

- Q = Qualifier
- WC = Wild card
- LL = Lucky loser
- Alt = Alternate
- ITF = ITF entry
- PR = Protected ranking
- SR = Special ranking
- SE = Special exempt
- JE = Junior exempt
- JR = Junior Accelerator Programme entrant
- CO = College Accelerator Programme entrant
- NG = Next Gen Accelerator Program entrant
- w/o = Walkover
- r = Retired
- d = Defaulted

First round

Quarterfinals

Semifinals

Final

1
- (Uruguay) A Behar
- (Brazil) F de Paula
7
3
[4]

PR
- (Portugal) G Elias
- (Brazil) J Pereira
5
6
[10]

PR
- (Portugal) G Elias
- (Brazil) J Pereira
6
7

WC
(Brazil) Breno Lodis
(Brazil) Gabriel Vallim
w/o

WC
(Brazil) B Lodis
(Brazil) G Vallim
3
5

- (Argentina) F Argüello
- (Brazil) JP Sorgi

PR
- (Portugal) G Elias
- (Brazil) J Pereira
2
6
[11]

3
- (Argentina) F Coria
- (Argentina) T Lipovšek Puches
6
6

3
- (Argentina) F Coria
- (Argentina) T Lipovšek Puches
6
3
[9]

WC
- (Brazil) E Russi Assumpção
- (Brazil) B Sant'Anna
1
3

3
- (Argentina) F Coria
- (Argentina) T Lipovšek Puches
6
6

- (Spain) Marc Giner
- (Spain) M Vilella Martínez
4
6^{4}

- (Brazil) G Clezar
- (Argentina) A Collarini
2
4

- (Brazil) G Clezar
- (Argentina) A Collarini
6
7^{7}

PR
- (Portugal) G Elias
- (Brazil) J Pereira
1
1

- (Austria) M Linzer
- (Portugal) G Oliveira
6
4
[10]

2
- (Argentina) M González
- (Brazil) F Neis
6
6

WC
- (Brazil) Christian Oliveira
- (Brazil) P Sakamoto
4
6
[7]

- (Austria) M Linzer
- (Portugal) G Oliveira
6
3
[8]

- (Brazil) O Luz
- (Brazil) F Romboli
w/o

- (Brazil) O Luz
- (Brazil) F Romboli
4
6
[10]

4
- (Argentina) JI Londero
- (Brazil) J Souza

- (Brazil) O Luz
- (Brazil) F Romboli
2
6^{2}

PR
- (Brazil) A Ghem
- (Spain) D Muñoz de la Nava
3
6
[8]

2
- (Argentina) M González
- (Brazil) F Neis
6
7^{7}

- (Argentina) H Casanova
- (Brazil) D Dutra da Silva
6
3
[10]

- (Argentina) H Casanova
- (Brazil) D Dutra da Silva
2
3

- (Argentina) M Kestelboim
- (Argentina) F Mena
3
2

2
- (Argentina) M González
- (Brazil) F Neis
6
6

2
- (Argentina) M González
- (Brazil) F Neis
6
6
