= 2012 IS Open de Tênis =

- Date: 23–29 April
- Edition: 1st
- Surface: Clay
- Location: São Paulo, Brazil

Champions

Singles
- (Slovenia) Blaž Kavčič

Doubles
- (Chile) Paul Capdeville / (Uruguay) Marcel Felder
IS Open de Tênis	· 2013 →

The 2012 IS Open de Tênis was a professional tennis tournament played on clay courts. It was the first edition of the tournament which was part of the 2012 ATP Challenger Tour. It took place in São Paulo, Brazil, on 23–29 April 2012.

== ATP entrants ==
=== Seeds ===
Country	Player	Rank^{1}	Seed
SVN	Blaž Kavčič	104	1
CHI	Paul Capdeville	113	2
BRA	Ricardo Mello	123	3
BRA	Rogério Dutra da Silva	125	4
BRA	Thiago Alves	152	5
ARG	Martín Alund	158	6
BRA	Júlio Silva	166	7
COL	Carlos Salamanca	176	8

- ^{1} Rankings are as of April 16, 2012.

=== Other entrants ===
The following players received wildcards into the singles main draw:

- (Brazil) Enrique Bogo
- (Brazil) Tiago Fernandes
- (Brazil) Fernando Romboli
- (Brazil) João Pedro Sorgi

The following players received entry as a special exempt into the singles main draw:

- (Brazil) Ricardo Hocevar

The following players received entry from the qualifying draw:

- (Argentina) Guido Andreozzi
- (Italy) Alberto Brizzi
- (Bosnia and Herzegovina) Damir Džumhur
- (Brazil) Leonardo Kirche

The following players received entry as lucky loser:

- (Croatia) Dino Marcan

=== Withdrawals ===
The following players withdrew from the main draw:

- (Argentina) Martín Alund

== Champions ==
=== Singles ===
- (Slovenia) Blaž Kavčič def. (Brazil) Júlio Silva, 6–3, 7–5

=== Doubles ===
- (Chile) Paul Capdeville / (Uruguay) Marcel Felder def. (Brazil) André Ghem / (Brazil) João Pedro Sorgi, 7–5, 6–3
