= 2015 São Paulo Challenger de Tênis – Singles =

Singles tennis competition held in Brazil

Singles
- 2015 São Paulo Challenger de Tênis

Final
- Champions: (Argentina) Guido Pella
- Runners-up: (Sweden) Christian Lindell
- Score: 7–5, 7–6^{(7–1)}

Events
Singles	Doubles
← 2014 ·	São Paulo Challenger de Tênis	· 2016 →

Rogério Dutra Silva was the defending champion, but he lost in the quarterfinals to José Hernández.

Guido Pella won the title, defeating Christian Lindell in the final, 7–5, 7–6^{(7–1)}

== Seeds ==
1. (Argentina) Máximo González (first round)
2. (Slovenia) Blaž Rola (second round)
3. (Brazil) André Ghem (first round)
4. (United States) Chase Buchanan (first round)
5. (Argentina) Guido Pella (champion)
6. (Brazil) Guilherme Clezar (second round)
7. (Chile) Nicolás Jarry (second round)
8. (Argentina) Guido Andreozzi (semifinals)

== Draw ==
=== Key ===
- Q = Qualifier
- WC = Wild card
- LL = Lucky loser
- Alt = Alternate
- SE = Special exempt
- PR = Protected ranking
- ITF = ITF entry
- JE = Junior exempt
- w/o = Walkover
- r = Retired
- d = Defaulted
- SR = Special ranking

=== Finals ===
Semifinals
8	(Argentina) Guido Andreozzi	6	4	1
(Sweden) Christian Lindell	3	6	6
5	(Argentina) Guido Pella	6	6
(Dominican Republic) José Hernández	3	3

Final
(Sweden) Christian Lindell	5	6^{1}
5	(Argentina) Guido Pella	7	7^{7}

=== Top half ===
First round
1	(Argentina) M González	7^{7}	2	4
(Belgium) G Gigounon	6^{4}	6	6
(France) Jules Marie	6	6
(Brazil) F de Paula	2	0
Q	(Brazil) R Hocevar	3	4
WC	(Brazil) T Monteiro	6	6
WC	(Brazil) Wilson Leite	3	2
8	(Argentina) G Andreozzi	6	6
4	(United States) C Buchanan	4	3
(Sweden) C Lindell	6	6
(Belgium) J Cagnina	6	5	2^{r}
Q	(Argentina) T Lipovšek Puches	2	7	5
Q	(Brazil) J Pereira	4	6	1
(Chile) G Lama	6	1	6
(Argentina) N Kicker	2	6^{1}
7	(Chile) N Jarry	6	7^{7}

Second round
(Belgium) G Gigounon	6	7^{7}
(France) J Marie	1	6^{0}
WC	(Brazil) T Monteiro	5	4
8	(Argentina) G Andreozzi	7	6
(Sweden) C Lindell	6	6
Q	(Argentina) T Lipovšek Puches	4	3
(Chile) G Lama	6	6
7	(Chile) N Jarry	3	3

Quarterfinals
(Belgium) G Gigounon	5	r
8	(Argentina) G Andreozzi	7
(Sweden) C Lindell	6	6
(Chile) G Lama	1	3

Semifinals
8	(Argentina) G Andreozzi	6	4	1
(Sweden) C Lindell	3	6	6

=== Bottom half ===
First round
5	(Argentina) G Pella	6	4	7^{7}
(Argentina) A Molteni	2	6	6^{4}
(Chile) C Garín	6	6
(France) G Mina	1	3
SE	(Brazil) O Luz	6	6
Q	(Argentina) F Coria	3	3
(France) A Musialek	6	6
3	(Brazil) A Ghem	3	4
6	(Brazil) G Clezar	6	4	6
(France) A Michon	1	6	3
(Dominican Republic) J Hernández	6	6
WC	(Brazil) P Sakamoto	1	1
(Chile) JC Sáez	5	6	3
WC	(Brazil) R Dutra Silva	7	2	6
(Brazil) Henrique Cunha	3	3
2	(Slovenia) B Rola	6	6

Second round
5	(Argentina) G Pella	6	7^{7}
(Chile) C Garín	1	6^{2}
SE	(Brazil) O Luz	6^{3}	7^{7}	7^{7}
(France) A Musialek	7^{7}	6^{1}	6^{4}
6	(Brazil) G Clezar	3	2
(Dominican Republic) J Hernández	6	6
WC	(Brazil) R Dutra Silva	6	4	6
2	(Slovenia) B Rola	4	6	4

Quarterfinals
5	(Argentina) G Pella	6	6^{6}	7
SE	(Brazil) O Luz	4	7^{8}	5
(Dominican Republic) J Hernández	7	7
WC	(Brazil) R Dutra Silva	5	5

Semifinals
5	(Argentina) G Pella	6	6
(Dominican Republic) J Hernández	3	3
