= 2013 IS Open =

- Date: 30 September – 6 October
- Edition: 1st
- Surface: Clay
- Location: São Paulo, Brazil

Champions

Singles
- (Argentina) Guido Pella

Doubles
- (Moldova) Roman Borvanov / (New Zealand) Artem Sitak
IS Open

The 2013 IS Open was a professional tennis tournament being played on hard courts. It was the first edition and only edition of the tournament which was part of the 2013 ATP Challenger Tour. It is taking place in São Paulo, Brazil between 30 September and 6 October 2013.

== Singles main draw entrants ==
=== Seeds ===
Country	Player	Rank^{1}	Seed
SLO	Blaž Kavčič	106	1
COL	Alejandro González	108	2
NED	Thiemo de Bakker	110	3
ARG	Guido Pella	115	4
RUS	Andrey Kuznetsov	117	5
ARG	Martín Alund	121	6
POR	Gastão Elias	129	7
BRA	Rogério Dutra da Silva	133	8

- ^{1} Rankings are as of September 23, 2013.

=== Other entrants ===
The following players received wildcards into the singles main draw:

- (Brazil) Leonardo Kirche
- (Brazil) Daniel Dutra da Silva
- (Brazil) Thiago Monteiro
- (Brazil) Tiago Lopes

The following players received entry from the qualifying draw:

- (United States) Bjorn Fratangelo
- (Brazil) Pedro Sakamoto
- (Brazil) Marcelo Demoliner
- (New Zealand) Artem Sitak

== Champions ==
=== Singles ===
- (Argentina) Guido Pella def. (Argentina) Facundo Argüello, 6–1, 6–0

=== Doubles ===
- (Moldova) Roman Borvanov / (New Zealand) Artem Sitak def. (Peru) Sergio Galdós / (Argentina) Guido Pella, 6–4, 7–6^{(7–3)}
