= 2017 São Paulo Challenger de Tênis – Singles =

Singles
- 2017 São Paulo Challenger de Tênis

Final
- Champion: (Portugal) Gastão Elias
- Runner-up: (Argentina) Renzo Olivo
- Score: 3–6, 6–3, 6–4

Events
Singles	Doubles
- São Paulo Challenger de Tênis

Gonzalo Lama was the defending champion but lost in the first round to João Souza.

Gastão Elias won the title after defeating Renzo Olivo 3–6, 6–3, 6–4 in the final.

== Seeds ==
1. (Argentina) Federico Delbonis (first round)
2. (Portugal) Pedro Sousa (withdrew)
3. (Argentina) Facundo Bagnis (second round)
4. (Argentina) Renzo Olivo (final)
5. (Portugal) Gastão Elias (champion)
6. (Slovakia) Andrej Martin (second round)
7. (Brazil) João Souza (second round)
8. (Portugal) Gonçalo Oliveira (semifinals)

== Draw ==
Key

- Q = Qualifier
- WC = Wild card
- LL = Lucky loser
- Alt = Alternate
- ITF = ITF entry
- PR = Protected ranking
- SR = Special ranking
- SE = Special exempt
- JE = Junior exempt
- JR = Junior Accelerator Programme entrant
- CO = College Accelerator Programme entrant
- NG = Next Gen Accelerator Program entrant
- w/o = Walkover
- r = Retired
- d = Defaulted

=== Finals ===
Semifinals
(Argentina) Andrea Collarini	6^{3}	6	3
4	(Argentina) Renzo Olivo	7^{7}	1	6
8	(Portugal) Gonçalo Oliveira	6	4	2
5	(Portugal) Gastão Elias	4	6	6

Final
4	(Argentina) Renzo Olivo	6	3	4
5	(Portugal) Gastão Elias	3	6	6

=== Top half ===
First round
1	(Argentina) F Delbonis	4	6	3
(Argentina) A Collarini	6	3	6
(Argentina) F Coria	7^{7}	6
Q	(Brazil) P Sakamoto	6^{4}	4
(Austria) M Linzer	4	6	6
(Brazil) JP Sorgi	6	4	1
WC	(Brazil) O Luz	3	3
6	(Slovakia) A Martin	6	6
4	(Argentina) R Olivo	2
(Argentina) JI Londero	0^{r}
(Argentina) F Mena	6	7
(Spain) M Vilella Martínez	2	5
(Argentina) JP Ficovich	5	6	4
Alt	(Spain) D Muñoz de la Nava	7	1	6
Q	(Chile) G Lama	4	3
7	(Brazil) J Souza	6	6

Second round
(Argentina) A Collarini	6	6
(Argentina) F Coria	2	1
(Austria) M Linzer	2	7	6
6	(Slovakia) A Martin	6	5	4
4	(Argentina) R Olivo	6	3	6
(Argentina) F Mena	3	6	2
Alt	(Spain) D Muñoz de la Nava	7^{7}	4	6
7	(Brazil) J Souza	6^{0}	6	4

Quarterfinals
(Argentina) A Collarini	5	7^{7}	3
(Austria) M Linzer	7	6^{4}	0^{r}
4	(Argentina) R Olivo	6	6
Alt	(Spain) D Muñoz de la Nava	4	4

Semifinals
(Argentina) A Collarini	6^{3}	6	3
4	(Argentina) R Olivo	7^{7}	1	6

=== Bottom half ===
First round
8	(Portugal) G Oliveira	3	7	0
(Spain) Marc Giner	6	5	0^{r}
(Argentina) F Argüello	7^{7}	4	2
WC	(Brazil) B Sant'Anna	6^{0}	6	6
Q	(Brazil) J Pereira	7	6
Q	(Argentina) T Lipovšek Puches	5	0
LL	(Brazil) D Dutra da Silva	3	4
3	(Argentina) F Bagnis	6	6
5	(Portugal) G Elias	6	3	6
(Austria) Lenny Hampel	3	6	0
(Brazil) G Clezar	6	6
(Sweden) C Lindell	3	2
WC	(Brazil) A Ghem	6	6
WC	(Brazil) Christian Oliveira	3	3
(Argentina) H Casanova	6	0	7
(Argentina) M González	2	6	5

Second round
8	(Portugal) G Oliveira	6	6
WC	(Brazil) B Sant'Anna	3	1
Q	(Brazil) J Pereira	6	6
3	(Argentina) F Bagnis	4	1
5	(Portugal) G Elias	6	7^{7}
(Brazil) G Clezar	4	6^{2}
WC	(Brazil) A Ghem	7^{7}	6
(Argentina) H Casanova	6^{2}	2

Quarterfinals
8	(Portugal) G Oliveira	6	6
Q	(Brazil) J Pereira	2	3
5	(Portugal) G Elias	6	3	6
WC	(Brazil) A Ghem	3	6	1

Semifinals
8	(Portugal) G Oliveira	6	4	2
5	(Portugal) G Elias	4	6	6
