= 2014 São Paulo Challenger de Tênis =

- Date: 14–20 April
- Edition: 2nd
- Draw: 32S / 16D
- Prize money: $50,000
- Surface: Clay
- Location: São Paulo, Brazil

Champions

Singles
- (Brazil) Rogério Dutra Silva

Doubles
- (Argentina) Guido Pella / (Argentina) Diego Sebastián Schwartzman
← 2013 ·	São Paulo Challenger de Tênis	· 2015 →

The 2014 São Paulo Challenger de Tênis was a professional tennis tournament played on clay courts. It was the second edition of the tournament which was part of the 2014 ATP Challenger Tour. It took place in São Paulo, Brazil on 14–20 April 2014.

== Singles entrants ==
=== Seeds ===
Country	Player	Rank	Seed
SVN	Blaž Rola	119	1
ARG	Guido Pella	125	2
ARG	Horacio Zeballos	126	3
ARG	Diego Sebastián Schwartzman	128	4
BRA	João Souza	140	5
BRA	Rogério Dutra Silva	155	6
ARG	Máximo González	158	7
POR	Gastão Elias	170	8

=== Other entrants ===
The following players received wildcards into the singles main draw:

- (Brazil) Bruno Sant'Anna
- (Brazil) Flávio Saretta
- (Brazil) Pedro Sakamoto
- (Brazil) Tiago Fernandes

The following players received entry from the qualifying draw:

- (Argentina) Guillermo Durán
- (Argentina) Gabriel Alejandro Hidalgo
- (Egypt) Sherif Sabry
- (Serbia) Nikola Ćirić

== Doubles entrants ==
=== Seeds ===
Country	Player	Country	Player	Rank	Seed
URU	Ariel Behar	ARG	Horacio Zeballos	248	1
BRA	Andre Sá	BRA	João Souza	249	2
ARG	Máximo González	ARG	Andrés Molteni	289	3
VEN	Roberto Maytín	BRA	Fernando Romboli	369	4

=== Other entrants ===
The following pairs received wildcards into the doubles main draw:

- (Brazil) Felipe Carvalho / (Brazil) Renato Lima
- (Brazil) Pedro Sakamoto / (Brazil) João Pedro Sorgi
- (Brazil) André Ghem / (Brazil) Flávio Saretta

== Champions ==
=== Singles ===
- (Brazil) Rogério Dutra Silva def. (Slovenia) Blaž Rola 6–4, 6–2

=== Doubles ===
- (Argentina) Guido Pella / (Argentina) Diego Sebastián Schwartzman def. (Argentina) Máximo González / (Argentina) Andrés Molteni 1–6, 6–3, [10–4]
