= São Paulo Challenger de Tênis =

Defunct tennis tournament
- Tour: ATP Challenger Tour (2013–2021); ITF Women's Circuit (2013)
- Location: São Paulo (2013-2016, 2019-2021), Campinas (2017), Brazil
- Venue: Clube Hípico Santo Amaro, São Paulo
- Surface: Clay
- Prize money: $52,080
- Website: Website

The São Paulo Challenger de Tênis was a professional tennis tournament played on outdoor clay courts. It was part of the Association of Tennis Professionals (ATP) Challenger Tour. The 2013 event was the first version of the tournament, which also featured a women's competition of the 2013 ITF Women's Circuit. It was sponsored by Braskem.

== Past finals ==
=== Men's singles ===
Year	Champion	Runner-up	Score
2021	(Argentina) Juan Pablo Ficovich	(Italy) Luciano Darderi	6–3, 7–5
2020	(Brazil) Felipe Meligeni Alves	(Portugal) Frederico Ferreira Silva	6–2, 7–6^{(7–1)}
2018-2019	Not held		
2017	(Portugal) Gastão Elias	(Argentina) Renzo Olivo	3–6, 6–3, 6–4
2016	(Chile) Gonzalo Lama	(United States) Ernesto Escobedo	6–2, 6–2
2015	(Argentina) Guido Pella	(Sweden) Christian Lindell	7–5, 7–6^{(7–1)}
2014	(Brazil) Rogério Dutra Silva	(Slovenia) Blaž Rola	6–4, 6–2
2013	(Colombia) Alejandro González	(Argentina) Eduardo Schwank	6–2, 6–3

=== Men's doubles ===
Year	Champion	Runners-up	Score
2021	(Colombia) Nicolás Barrientos (Colombia) Alejandro Gómez	(Brazil) Rafael Matos (Brazil) Felipe Meligeni Alves	Walkover
2020	(Venezuela) Luis David Martínez (Brazil) Felipe Meligeni Alves	(Brazil) Rogério Dutra Silva (Brazil) Fernando Romboli	6–3, 6–3
2018-2019	Not held		
2017	(Argentina) Máximo González (Brazil) Fabrício Neis	(Portugal) Gastão Elias (Brazil) José Pereira	6–1, 6–1
2016	(Brazil) Fabrício Neis (Brazil) Caio Zampieri	(Brazil) José Pereira (Brazil) Alexandre Tsuchiya	6–4, 7–6^{(7–3)}
2015	(United States) Chase Buchanan (Slovenia) Blaž Rola	(Argentina) Guido Andreozzi (Peru) Sergio Galdós	6–4, 6–4
2014	(Argentina) Guido Pella (Argentina) Diego Schwartzman	(Argentina) Máximo González (Argentina) Andrés Molteni	1–6, 6–3, [10–4]
2013	(Brazil) Fernando Romboli (Argentina) Eduardo Schwank	(El Salvador) Marcelo Arévalo (Colombia) Nicolás Barrientos	6–7^{(6–8)}, 6–4, [10–8]

=== Women's singles ===
Year	Champion	Runner-up	Score
2013	(Peru) Bianca Botto	(Brazil) Gabriela Cé	7–6^{(7–2)}, 5–7, 6–2

=== Women's doubles ===
Year	Champion	Runners-up	Score
2013	(Brazil) Laura Pigossi (Argentina) Carolina Zeballos	(Brazil) Nathália Rossi (Brazil) Luisa Stefani	6–3, 6–4
