= Renzo Olivo =

Argentine tennis player (born 1992)

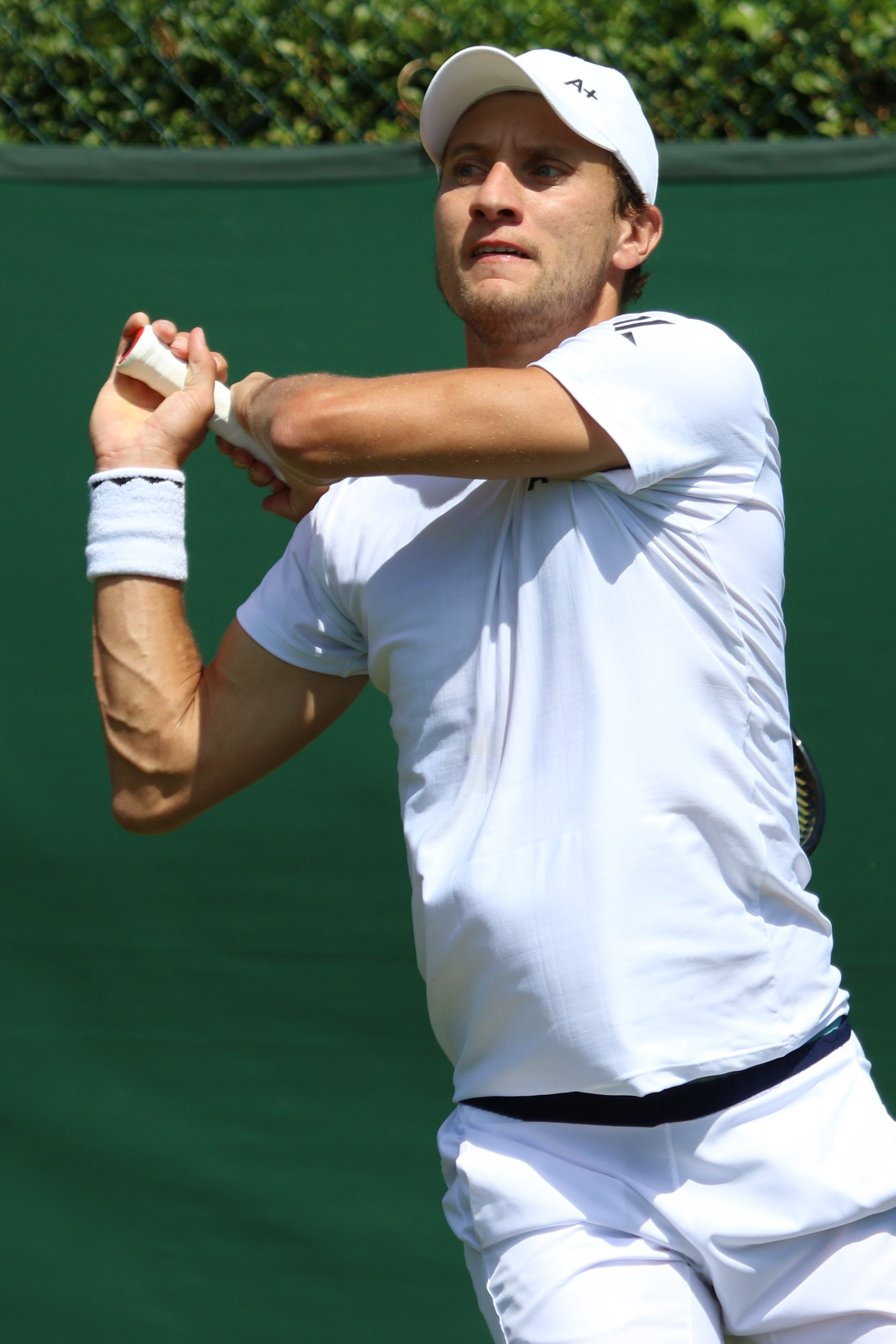
- Olivo at the 2022 Wimbledon Championships
- Country (sports): Argentina
- Residence: Rosario, Argentina
- Born: 15 March 1992 (age 34) Rosario, Argentina
- Height: 1.80 m (5 ft 11 in)
- Turned pro: 2009
- Plays: Right-handed (two-handed backhand)
- Coach: Javier Nalbandian, Franco Squillari (2017–present), Francisco Yunis (–2017)
- Prize money: US$1,466,533
- Official website: renzoolivo.com

Singles
- Career record: 23–33
- Career titles: 0
- Highest ranking: No. 78 (9 January 2017)
- Current ranking: No. 895 (18 May 2026)

Grand Slam singles results
- Australian Open: 2R (2016)
- French Open: 2R (2017)
- Wimbledon: 1R (2017)
- US Open: Q2 (2017)

Doubles
- Career record: 6–9
- Career titles: 0
- Highest ranking: No. 148 (29 April 2013)
- Current ranking: No. 1,185 (18 May 2026)

Grand Slam doubles results
- Australian Open: 1R (2017)

Team competitions
- Davis Cup: W (2016)
- Last updated on: 18 May 2026.

Renzo Olivo (Latin American Spanish: [ˈrenso oˈliβo]; born 15 March 1992) is an Argentine professional tennis player. He competes mainly on the ATP Challenger Tour and ITF Futures, both in singles and doubles. He has a career-high singles ranking of world No. 78 achieved on 9 January 2017 and a doubles ranking of world No. 148 achieved on 29 April 2013.

== Career ==
At the 2014 Swedish Open in Båstad, he made it through three rounds of qualifying to reach his first ATP tour main draw, and then he reached the quarterfinals, defeating second seed Tommy Robredo.

He earned the biggest win of his career at the 2017 French Open, when he beat twelfth seed and home favourite Jo-Wilfried Tsonga in four sets.

== ATP Challenger and ITF Futures finals ==
=== Singles: 16 (8–8) ===
| Legend (singles) ATP Challenger Tour (3–6) ITF Futures Tour (5–2) | Finals by surface Hard (0–0) Clay (8–8) Grass (0–0) Carpet (0–0) |

| Result | W–L | Date | Tournament | Tier | Surface | Opponent | Score |
|---|---|---|---|---|---|---|---|
| Win | 1–0 | Oct 2010 | Bolivia F4, Santa Cruz | Futures | Clay | (Argentina) Diego Schwartzman | 7–5, 7–6^{(7–3)} |
| Loss | 1–1 | Oct 2011 | Argentina F21, Rosario | Futures | Clay | (Argentina) Leandro Migani | 2–6, 5–7 |
| Win | 2–1 | Mar 2012 | Chile F4, Santiago | Futures | Clay | (Argentina) Leandro Migani | 7–6^{(7–2)}, 7–5 |
| Win | 3–1 | Apr 2012 | Argentina F5, Villa Del Dique | Futures | Clay | (Brazil) Jose Pereira | 7–5, 6–7^{(7–9)}, 6–4 |
| Win | 4–1 | May 2012 | Peru F1, Chosica | Futures | Clay | (Peru) Duilio Beretta | 7–5, 3–6, 6–1 |
| Loss | 4–2 | Jul 2012 | Argentina F18, Bell Ville | Futures | Clay | (Italy) Federico Gaio | 5–7, 5–7 |
| Win | 5–2 | Nov 2012 | Argentina F26, Rosario | Futures | Clay | (Argentina) Guillermo Durán | 3–6, 6–2, 6–4 |
| Loss | 5–3 | Mar 2013 | Salinas, Ecuador | Challenger | Clay | (Colombia) Alejandro González | 6–4, 3–6, 6–7^{(7–9)} |
| Loss | 5–4 | Apr 2013 | São Paulo, Brazil | Challenger | Clay | (Chile) Paul Capdeville | 2–6, 2–6 |
| Loss | 5–5 | Feb 2015 | Santo Domingo, Dominican Republic | Challenger | Clay | (Bosnia and Herzegovina) Damir Džumhur | 5–7, 1–3 ret. |
| Win | 6–5 | Sep 2016 | Santos, Brazil | Challenger | Clay | (Brazil) Thiago Monteiro | 6–4, 7–6^{(7–5)} |
| Win | 7–5 | Oct 2016 | Buenos Aires, Argentina | Challenger | Clay | (Argentina) Leonardo Mayer | 2–6, 7–6^{(7–3)}, 7–6^{(7–3)} |
| Loss | 7–6 | Oct 2017 | Campinas, Brazil | Challenger | Clay | (Portugal) Gastão Elias | 6–3, 3–6, 4–6 |
| Win | 8–6 | Jul 2019 | San Benedetto, Italy | Challenger | Clay | (Italy) Alessandro Giannessi | 5–7, 7–6^{(7–4)}, 6–4 |
| Loss | 8–7 | May 2021 | Ostrava, Czech Republic | Challenger | Clay | (France) Benjamin Bonzi | 4–6, 4–6 |
| Loss | 8–8 | Apr 2022 | San Luis Potosí, Mexico | Challenger | Clay | (Switzerland) Antoine Bellier | 7–6^{(7–2)}, 4–6, 5–7 |

=== Doubles: 33 (17–16) ===
| Legend (doubles) ATP Challenger Tour (7–10) ITF Futures Tour (10–6) | Finals by surface Hard (1–3) Clay (16–13) Grass (0–0) Carpet (0–0) |

| Result | W–L | Date | Tournament | Tier | Surface | Partner | Opponents | Score |
|---|---|---|---|---|---|---|---|---|
| Win | 1–0 | May 2010 | Argentina F5, Buenos Aires | Futures | Clay | (Argentina) Diego Schwartzman | (Argentina) Facundo Argüello (Argentina) Agustín Velotti | 2–6, 6–2, [10–8] |
| Loss | 1–1 | Oct 2010 | Argentina F20, La Rioja | Futures | Clay | (Argentina) Guillermo Bujniewicz | (Argentina) Patricio Heras (Argentina) Agustin Picco | 2–6, 3–6 |
| Win | 2–1 | Nov 2010 | Peru F3, Lima | Futures | Clay | (Brazil) Diego Matos | (Ecuador) Julio César Campozano (Ecuador) Emilio Gómez | 6–3, 3–6, [10–3] |
| Win | 3–1 | Apr 2011 | Chile F1, Viña del Mar | Futures | Clay | (Italy) Stefano Travaglia | (Chile) Guillermo Rivera Aránguiz (Chile) Cristóbal Saavedra Corvalán | 5–7, 6–3, [10–1] |
| Loss | 3–2 | Jun 2011 | Argentina F6, Posadas | Futures | Clay | (Argentina) Federico Coria | (Argentina) Guillermo Durán (Argentina) Joaquin-Jesus Monteferrario | 4–6, 6–7^{(4–7)} |
| Loss | 3–3 | Jun 2011 | Argentina F8, Corrientes | Futures | Clay | (Argentina) Joaquin-Jesus Monteferrario | (Brazil) Guilherme Cezar (Brazil) Rodrigue Guidolin | 6–4, 5–7, [8–10] |
| Win | 4–3 | Sep 2011 | Como, Italy | Challenger | Clay | (Argentina) Federico Delbonis | (Argentina) Martín Alund (Argentina) Facundo Argüello | 6–1, 6–4 |
| Loss | 4–4 | Oct 2011 | Argentina F18, San Juan | Futures | Clay | (Argentina) Juan-Manuel Romanazzi | (Argentina) Juan-Pablo Villar (Italy) Giorgio Portaluri | 4–6, 5–7 |
| Loss | 4–5 | Oct 2011 | Argentina F19, Mendoza | Futures | Clay | (Argentina) Martín Alund | (Argentina) Alejandro Fabbri (Italy) Jonathan Gonzalia | 3–6, 0–6 |
| Win | 5–5 | Oct 2011 | Argentina F21, Rosario | Futures | Clay | (United States) Andrea Collarini | (Italy) Giammarco Micolani (Italy) Giorgio Portaluri | 4–6, 6–4, [11–9] |
| Win | 6–5 | Dec 2011 | Brazil F42, Porto Alegre | Futures | Clay | (Argentina) Guillermo Durán | (Argentina) Martín Alund (Argentina) Andrés Molteni | 6–4, 6–2 |
| Loss | 6–6 | Mar 2012 | Argentina F4, Córdoba | Futures | Clay | (Brazil) Diego Matos | (Argentina) Diego Schwartzman (Argentina) Maximiliano Estévez | 1–6, 1–6 |
| Win | 7–6 | Apr 2012 | Argentina F6, Villa Maria | Futures | Clay | (Peru) Sergio Galdós | (Argentina) Tomás Lipovšek Puches (Argentina) Juan Pablo Ortiz | 1–6, 6–4, [10–4] |
| Win | 8–6 | May 2012 | Peru F1, Chosica | Futures | Clay | (Brazil) Marcelo Demoliner | (Peru) Duilio Beretta (Peru) Sergio Galdós | 6–3, 7–6^{(10–8)} |
| Win | 9–6 | Jun 2012 | Peru F2, Lima | Futures | Clay | (Brazil) Marcelo Demoliner | (Brazil) Victor Maynard (Brazil) Fernando Romboli | 2–6, 7–5, [10–5] |
| Win | 10–6 | Jul 2012 | Peru F6, Lima | Futures | Clay | (Brazil) Marcelo Demoliner | (Peru) Duilio Beretta (Peru) Sergio Galdós | 6–4, 6–3 |
| Win | 11–6 | Jul 2012 | Argentina F18, Bell Ville | Futures | Clay | (Argentina) Guillermo Durán | (Uruguay) Martín Cuevas (Argentina) Juan Ignacio Londero | 6–4, 7–5 |
| Win | 12–6 | Aug 2012 | Manta, Ecuador | Challenger | Hard | (Peru) Duilio Beretta | (Dominican Republic) Víctor Estrella Burgos (Brazil) João Souza | 6–3, 6–0 |
| Loss | 12–7 | Nov 2012 | Medellín, Colombia | Challenger | Clay | (Argentina) Marco Trungelliti | (United States) Nicholas Monroe (Germany) Simon Stadler | 4–6, 4–6 |
| Loss | 12–8 | Jan 2013 | São Paulo, Brazil | Challenger | Hard | (Argentina) Federico Delbonis | (United States) James Cerretani (Canada) Adil Shamasdin | 7–6^{(7–5)}, 1–6, [9–11] |
| Loss | 12–9 | Jul 2013 | Orbetello, Italy | Challenger | Clay | (Argentina) Guillermo Durán | (Italy) Marco Crugnola (Italy) Simone Vagnozzi | 6–7^{(3–7)}, 7–6^{(7–5)}, [6–10] |
| Loss | 12–10 | Apr 2014 | Santos, Brazil | Challenger | Clay | (Argentina) Guillermo Durán | (Argentina) Máximo González (Argentina) Andrés Molteni | 5–7, 4–6 |
| Loss | 12–11 | Jun 2015 | Fürth, Germany | Challenger | Hard | (Spain) Íñigo Cervantes | (Argentina) Guillermo Durán (Argentina) Horacio Zeballos | 1–6, 3–6 |
| Win | 13–11 | Jun 2015 | Moscow, Russia | Challenger | Clay | (Argentina) Horacio Zeballos | (Chile) Julio Peralta (United States) Matt Seeberger | 7–5, 6–3 |
| Loss | 13–12 | Oct 2015 | São Paulo, Brazil | Challenger | Clay | (Argentina) Nicolás Kicker | (Chile) Hans Podlipnik Castillo (Brazil) Caio Zampieri | 5–7, 0–6 |
| Win | 14–12 | Jun 2021 | Biella, Italy | Challenger | Clay | (Argentina) Tomás Martín Etcheverry | (Venezuela) Luis David Martínez (Spain) David Vega Hernández | 3–6, 6–3, [10–8] |
| Loss | 14–13 | Jul 2021 | Porto, Portugal | Challenger | Hard | (Mexico) Miguel Ángel Reyes-Varela | (Argentina) Guido Andreozzi (Argentina) Guillermo Durán | 7–6^{(7–5)}, 6–7^{(5–7)}, [9–11] |
| Loss | 14–14 | Jul 2021 | Perugia, Italy | Challenger | Clay | (Argentina) Tomás Martín Etcheverry | (Ukraine) Vitaliy Sachko (Switzerland) Dominic Stricker | 3–6, 7–5, [8–10] |
| Loss | 14–15 | Aug 2021 | Cordenons, Italy | Challenger | Clay | (Peru) Sergio Galdós | (Brazil) Orlando Luz (Brazil) Rafael Matos | 4-6, 6-7^{(5–7)} |
| Win | 15–15 | Mar 2022 | Concepción, Chile | Challenger | Clay | (Argentina) Andrea Collarini | (Ecuador) Diego Hidalgo (Colombia) Cristian Rodríguez | 6-4, 6–4 |
| Win | 16–15 | Jul 2022 | Iași, Romania | Challenger | Clay | (France) Geoffrey Blancaneaux | (Ecuador) Diego Hidalgo (Colombia) Cristian Rodríguez | 6–4, 2–6, [10–6] |
| Loss | 16–16 | Jan 2023 | Piracicaba, Brazil | Challenger | Clay | (Argentina) Andrea Collarini | (Brazil) Orlando Luz (Brazil) Marcelo Zormann | walkover |
| Win | 17–16 | Sep 2023 | Bogotá, Colombia | Challenger | Clay | (Argentina) Thiago Agustin Tirante | (Argentina) Guillermo Durán (Brazil) Orlando Luz | 7–6^{(8–6)}, 6–4 |

== Singles performance timeline ==
Key
| W | F | SF | QF | #R | RR | Q# | DNQ | A | NH |

(W) winner; (F) finalist; (SF) semifinalist; (QF) quarterfinalist; (#R) rounds 4, 3, 2, 1; (RR) round-robin stage; (Q#) qualification round; (DNQ) did not qualify; (A) absent; (NH) not held; (SR) strike rate (events won / competed); (W–L) win–loss record.
To avoid confusion and double counting, these charts are updated at the conclusion of a tournament or when the player's participation has ended.

Current after the 2023 French Open

| Tournament | 2013 | 2014 | 2015 | 2016 | 2017 | 2018 | 2019 | 2020 | 2021 | 2022 | 2023 | W–L |
|---|---|---|---|---|---|---|---|---|---|---|---|---|
Grand Slam tournaments
| Australian Open | A | A | A | 2R | 1R | Q1 | A | A | Q1 | Q2 | Q1 | 1–2 |
| French Open | Q2 | A | Q1 | Q1 | 2R | Q1 | A | Q3 | Q2 | Q1 | Q3 | 1–1 |
| Wimbledon | Q1 | A | Q1 | Q1 | 1R | Q1 | A | NH | Q1 | Q3 | A | 0–1 |
| US Open | Q1 | A | Q1 | Q1 | Q2 | A | A | A | Q1 | Q1 | A | 0–0 |
| Win–loss | 0–0 | 0–0 | 0–0 | 1–1 | 1–3 | 0–0 | 0–0 | 0–0 | 0–0 | 0–0 | 0–0 | 2–4 |
