= Guido Pella =

Argentine tennis player (born 1990)

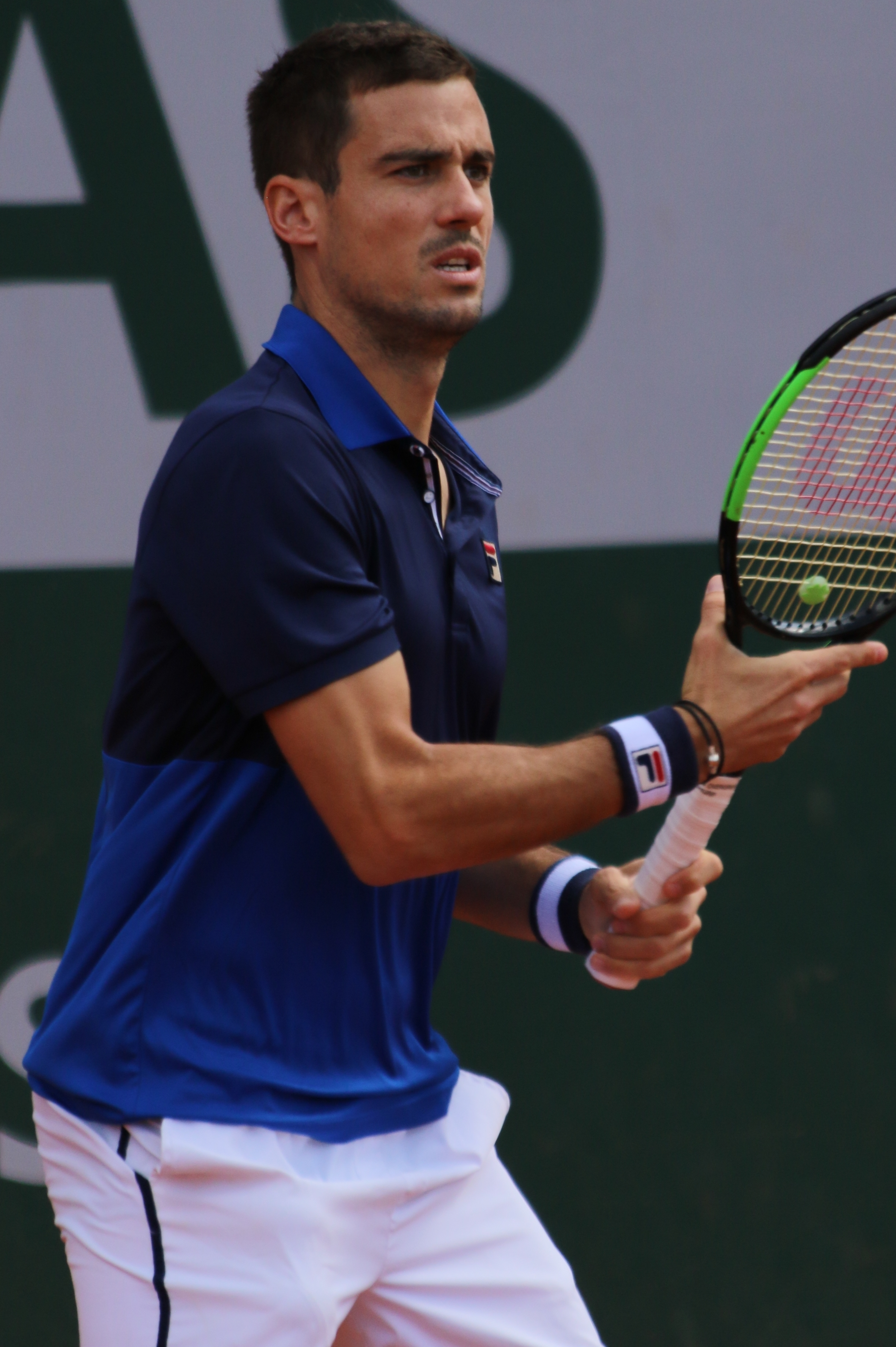
- Pella at the 2019 French Open
- Country (sports): Argentina
- Residence: Buenos Aires, Argentina
- Born: 17 May 1990 (age 36) Bahía Blanca, Argentina
- Height: 1.83 m (6 ft 0 in)
- Turned pro: 2007
- Retired: 2023
- Plays: Left-handed (two-handed backhand)
- Coach: Jose Acasuso, Kevin Konfederak
- Prize money: US $6,377,946
- Official website: guidopella.com

Singles
- Career record: 128–151
- Career titles: 1
- Highest ranking: No. 20 (19 August 2019)

Grand Slam singles results
- Australian Open: 3R (2020)
- French Open: 2R (2013, 2016, 2018, 2019, 2020, 2021, 2023)
- Wimbledon: QF (2019)
- US Open: 3R (2018)

Doubles
- Career record: 39–69
- Career titles: 0
- Highest ranking: No. 55 (1 July 2019)

Grand Slam doubles results
- Australian Open: 2R (2020)
- French Open: SF (2019)
- Wimbledon: 1R (2016, 2019, 2023)
- US Open: 1R (2016, 2017, 2018, 2019)

Team competitions
- Davis Cup: W (2016)

Guido Pella (Spanish pronunciation: [ˈɡiðo ˈpela]; born 17 May 1990) is an Argentine former professional tennis player. He has a career-high ATP singles ranking of world No. 20 achieved on 19 August 2019 and a best doubles ranking of No. 55 achieved on 1 July 2019.

== Personal life ==
His father, Carlos, taught him the game at the age of five. His sister, Catalina, is also a tennis player who competes mainly in ITF tournaments. He is engaged to marry the model and entrepreneur Stephanie Demner.

In February 2020, Pella announced via his Instagram account that he would be out indefinitely after being diagnosed with Morton's neuroma.

== Career ==
=== Junior career ===
As a junior Pella posted a 19–5 record in singles and reached as high as No. 42 in the combined world rankings in 2008. Entering as a qualifier, he reached the semifinals of the French Open boys' singles in 2008, upsetting first-seeded Bernard Tomic in the quarterfinals (and losing to Jerzy Janowicz).

=== 2007–2011: Pro beginnings ===
Pella started playing Futures tournaments in 2005.

In July 2008 He won his first F3 event in Peru without dropping a set. In the following years, he won six further Futures titles, all of them on clay. His first Challenger final came at Guayaquil, Ecuador in November 2011, losing the match to Matteo Viola in straight sets. He finished the 2011 season ranked world no. 350 in singles and no. 501 in doubles.

=== 2012: Grand Slam & top 100 in singles & top 200 in doubles debut ===
Pella started his 2012 Challenger season in March, capturing his first title in that category at the Salinas Challenger in Ecuador, with a victory over Paolo Lorenzi in the final round. The following month, he won his first doubles Challenger title at the Pereira Challenger in Colombia, partnering Martín Alund.

In May, he entered the French Open qualifying draw, losing in the first round to former world no. 2 Tommy Haas. In August, he won his first hard-court tournament at the Manta Challenger, beating Maximiliano Estévez in the final.

In the US Open, he made it through the qualifying stage of the tournament, beating Lukáš Rosol to reach his first Grand Slam main-draw match, which he lost to Nikolay Davydenko in four sets. In September, he defeated Alex Bogomolov Jr. and Leonardo Kirche on his way to win the Campinas Challenger in Brazil.

He cracked the top 100 for the first time after winning the 2012 ATP Challenger Tour Finals, defeating Adrian Ungur in the final round. Pella finished the year ranked world no. 97 in singles and world no. 187 in doubles, a career high and a 249-spots improvement since the beginning of the season.

=== 2013: Grand Slam debuts at Australian & French & Wimbledon ===
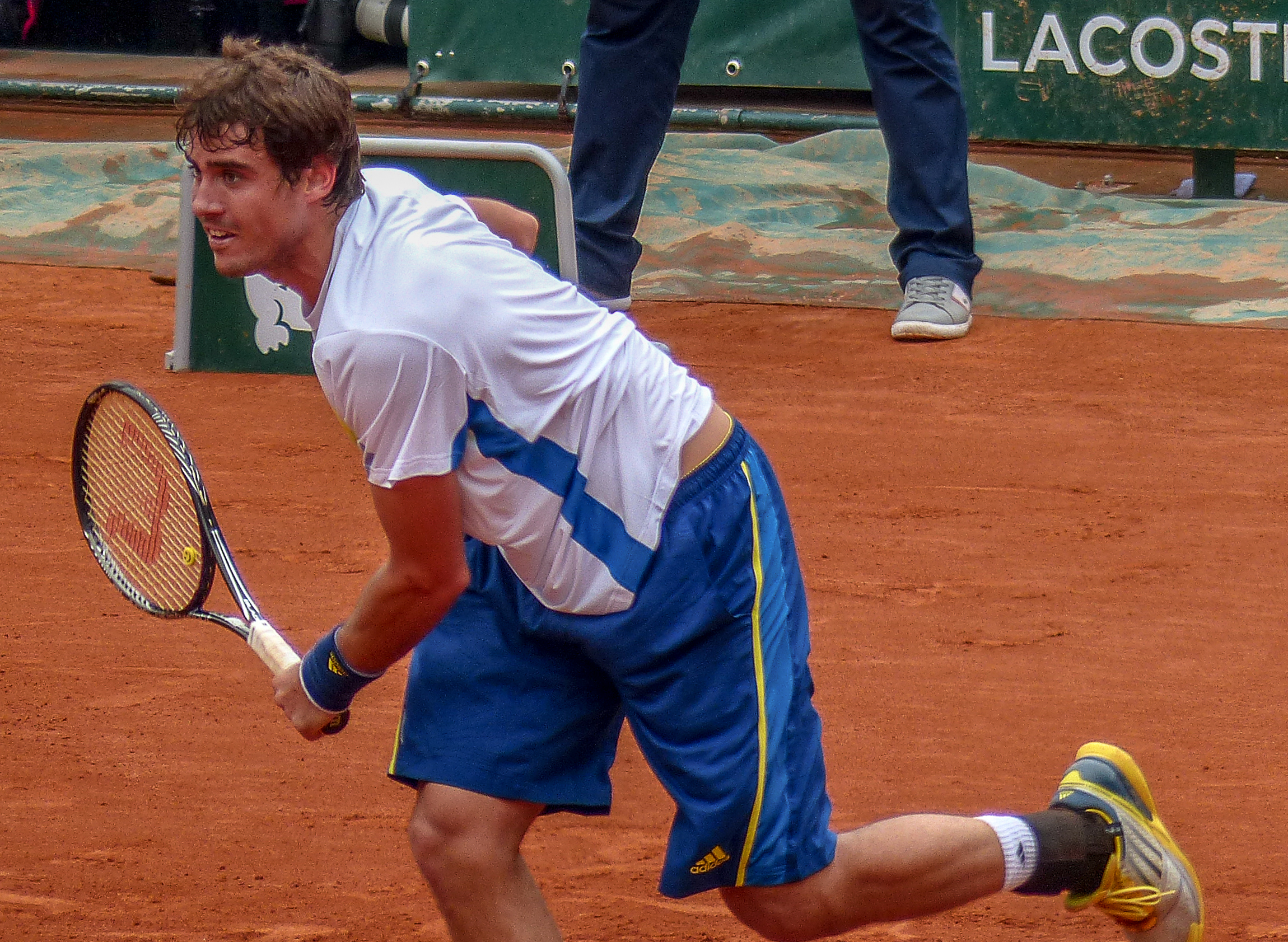
Pella in 2013

Guido Pella entered the 2013 Australian Open main draw directly, but he lost in the first round to qualifier Amir Weintraub. He then competed in Viña del Mar, also losing in the first round, this time to countryman Federico Delbonis. The following week, he played at the Brasil Open, winning his first ATP World Tour-level match against sixth seed Fabio Fognini, losing then in the second round to eventual finalist David Nalbandian. At 2013 Düsseldorf, he advanced to his first ATP semifinal starting as a qualifier, defeating No. 10 Janko Tipsarević along the way.

=== 2019: First title & Major quarterfinal, top 20 in singles, top 55 in doubles ===
Pella reached his fourth ATP Tour final in Córdoba Open in February, but lost to compatriot Juan Ignacio Londero in three sets. Having lost each of his previous four finals, in March 2019, he won his first ATP title at the 2019 Brasil Open. He defeated Cristian Garín in straight sets.

At the 2019 Mutua Madrid Open he reached the semifinals of a Masters 1000 for the first time, partnering João Sousa where they lost to Dominic Thiem and Diego Schwartzman. Following this successful run, he entered the top 100 in doubles at World No. 99 on 13 May 2019. Later in June, at the 2019 French Open he also reached the semifinals in doubles for the first time in his career partnering with Schwartzman this time where they were defeated by eventual champions German duo Kevin Krawietz and Andreas Mies. As a result, he reached a career-high of No. 56 in doubles on 10 June 2019.

At Wimbledon in July, he reached his first-ever Grand Slam singles quarterfinal by defeating former World Number 3 and 2016 Wimbledon finalist Milos Raonic in five sets from two sets down, but was then defeated by Roberto Bautista Agut. The victory marked his third against the most-recent runners-up of Wimbledon: He had previously defeated 2017 Wimbledon finalist Marin Čilić in the second round of 2018 Wimbledon, also from two sets down, and 2018 Wimbledon finalist Kevin Anderson in the third round of the 2019 championships. Following his successful runs at the Canada and Cincinnati Masters of third and second round respectively on his debut, he reached a career-high in singles of World No. 20 on 19 August 2019.

=== 2020–2021: Major third round, ATP Cup ===
He participated in the Inaugural 2020 ATP Cup where Argentina reached the quarterfinals and also in the 2021 ATP Cup where Argentina reached second place in their group (first place was Russia) and was eliminated from reaching the semifinals knockout stage.

Seeded 22nd, Pella reached the third round at the 2020 Australian Open for the first time in his career where he lost to 12th seed Fabio Fognini. He announced an indefinite break due to health issues but returned to the tour after 6 months at the 2020 US Open.

At the 2021 Western & Southern Open Masters 1000 in Cincinnati he reached the third round by defeating 15th seed David Goffin, and took his revenge for the loss at the Australian Open in 2020 by defeating Fabio Fognini in the second round.

=== 2022–2023: Full season hiatus, Major third round, Retirement ===
After a year hiatus, he entered the 2023 Australian Open using a protected ranking. Using also his protected ranking he reached the second rounds of the 2023 BNP Paribas Open and the 2023 Miami Open defeating Thiago Monteiro and Juan Pablo Varillas respectively. As a result, he jumped more the 250 positions back into the top 500.

He entered the Italian Open using protected ranking and reached the second round defeating Maxime Cressy. He moved another 60 positions up in the top 450. At the 2023 French Open he also reached the second round defeating Quentin Halys in five sets with a super tiebreak in the fifth, coming back from two sets to one down, and moved another 95 positions up in the top 350 in the rankings. At the 2023 Wimbledon Championships he defeated 13th seed Borna Ćorić and qualifier Harold Mayot to reach the third round.

On 16 September 2023, Pella announced his retirement from professional tennis.

== Performance timelines ==
Key
W	F	SF	QF	#R	RR	Q#	P#	DNQ	A	Z#	PO	G	S	B	NMS	NTI	P	NH

(W) winner; (F) finalist; (SF) semifinalist; (QF) quarterfinalist; (#R) rounds 4, 3, 2, 1; (RR) round-robin stage; (Q#) qualification round; (P#) preliminary round; (DNQ) did not qualify; (A) absent; (Z#) Davis/Fed Cup Zonal Group (with number indication) or (PO) play-off; (G) gold, (S) silver or (B) bronze Olympic/Paralympic medal; (NMS) not a Masters tournament; (NTI) not a Tier I tournament; (P) postponed; (NH) not held; (SR) strike rate (events won / competed); (W–L) win–loss record.
To avoid confusion and double counting, these charts are updated at the conclusion of a tournament or when the player's participation has ended.

Only main-draw results in ATP Tour, Grand Slam tournaments, Davis Cup/ATP Cup/Laver Cup and Olympic Games are included in win–loss records.

=== Singles ===
Current through the 2023 Miami Open.

Tournament	2012	2013	2014	2015	2016	2017	2018	2019	2020	2021	2022	2023	SR	W–L	Win %
Grand Slam tournaments
Australian Open	A	1R	A	A	2R	1R	1R	1R	3R	1R	A	1R	0 / 8	3–8	27%
French Open	Q1	2R	Q2	Q2	2R	1R	2R	2R	2R	2R	A	2R	0 / 8	7–8	47%
Wimbledon	A	1R	A	Q3	1R	A	3R	QF	NH	1R	A	3R	0 / 6	8–6	57%
US Open	1R	1R	Q1	1R	2R	2R	3R	1R	1R	2R	A	1R	0 / 10	5–10	33%
Win–loss	0–1	1–4	0–0	0–1	3–4	1–3	5–4	5–4	3–3	2–4	0–0	3–4	0 / 32	23–32	42%
ATP Masters 1000 tournaments
Indian Wells Masters	A	1R	Q2	A	3R	2R	1R	3R	NH	2R	A	2R	0 / 6	7–7	45%
Miami Open	A	2R	1R	A	1R	3R	1R	2R	NH	A	A	2R	0 / 7	4–7	36%
Monte-Carlo Masters	A	A	A	A	1R	A	1R	QF	NH	1R	A	A	0 / 4	2–4	33%
Madrid Open	A	A	A	A	1R	A	A	2R	NH	1R	A	A	0 / 3	1–3	25%
Italian Open	A	A	A	A	1R	A	A	1R	1R	A	A	2R	0 / 4	1–4	20%
Canadian Open	A	A	A	A	A	A	A	3R	NH	A	A	A	0 / 1	2–1	67%
Cincinnati Masters	A	A	A	A	A	A	A	2R	A	3R	A	A	0 / 2	3–2	60%
Shanghai Masters	A	A	A	A	1R	A	A	1R	NH			A	0 / 2	0–2	0%
Paris Masters	A	A	A	A	1R	Q1	Q1	A	A	A	A	A	0 / 1	0–1	0%
Win–loss	0–0	1–2	0–1	0–0	2–7	3–2	0–3	8–8	0–0	3–4	0–0	3–3	0 / 30	20–30	40%
Career statistics
Tournaments	1	13	4	4	22	15	22	26	8	18	0	13	Career total: 146		
Titles	0	0	0	0	0	0	0	1	0	0	0	0	Career total: 1		
Finals	0	0	0	0	1	1	1	2	0	0	0	0	Career total: 5		
Overall win–loss	0–1	7–13	3–4	1–4	16–23	16–18	25–22	36–25	7–10	8–18	0–0	9–13	1 / 146	128–151	46%
Year-end ranking	97	118	155	74	80	64	58	25	43	74	–	–	$6,368,373		

=== Doubles ===
Tournament	2016	2017	2018	2019	2020	2021	2022	2023	SR	W–L	Win %
Grand Slam tournaments
Australian Open	1R	1R	1R	1R	2R	1R	A	1R	0 / 7	1–7	13%
French Open	1R	A	2R	SF	2R	2R	A	1R	0 / 6	7–6	54%
Wimbledon	1R	A	A	1R	NH	A	A	1R	0 / 3	0–3	0%
US Open	1R	1R	1R	1R	A	A	A	1R	0 / 5	0–5	0%
Win–loss	0–4	0–2	1–3	4–4	2–2	1–2	0–0	0–4	0 / 21	8–21	28%
ATP Masters 1000 tournaments
Indian Wells Masters	2R	A	A	1R	NH	A	A		0 / 2	1–2	33%
Miami Open	A	A	A	2R	NH	A	A		0 / 1	1–1	50%
Monte-Carlo Masters	A	A	A	2R	NH	QF	A		0 / 2	3–2	60%
Madrid Open	1R	A	A	SF	NH	A	A		0 / 2	3–2	60%
Italian Open	A	A	A	2R	1R	A	A		0 / 2	1–2	33%
Canadian Open	A	A	A	1R	NH	A	A		0 / 1	0–1	0%
Cincinnati Masters	A	A	A	1R	A	A	A		0 / 1	0–1	0%
Shanghai Masters	A	A	A	1R	NH				0 / 1	0–1	0%
Paris Masters	A	A	A	A	A	A	A		0 / 0	0–0	0%
Win–loss	1–2	0–0	0–0	6–8	0–1	2–1	0–0	2–6	0 / 18	11–18	43%

== ATP career finals ==
=== Singles: 5 (1 title, 4 runner-ups) ===
Legend Grand Slam (0-0) ATP Finals (0-0) ATP Masters 1000 (0-0) ATP 500 Series (0–1) ATP 250 Series (1–3)	Finals by surface Hard (0–0) Clay (1–4) Grass (0–0)	Finals by setting Outdoor (0–4) Indoor (1–0)

Result	W–L	Date	Tournament	Tier	Surface	Opponent	Score
Loss	0–1	Feb 2016	Rio Open, Brazil	500 Series	Clay	(Uruguay) Pablo Cuevas	4–6, 7–6^{(7–5)}, 4–6
Loss	0–2	May 2017	Bavarian Championships, Germany	250 Series	Clay	(Germany) Alexander Zverev	4–6, 3–6
Loss	0–3	Jul 2018	Croatia Open Umag, Croatia	250 Series	Clay	(Italy) Marco Cecchinato	2–6, 6–7^{(4–7)}
Loss	0–4	Feb 2019	Córdoba Open, Argentina	250 Series	Clay	(Argentina) Juan Ignacio Londero	6–3, 5–7, 1–6
Win	1–4	Mar 2019	Brasil Open, Brazil	250 Series	Clay (i)	(Chile) Cristian Garín	7–5, 6–3

== Team competitions finals ==
=== Davis Cup: 1 (1 title) ===
Outcome	Date	Tournament	Surface	Partner(s)	Opponents	Score
Win	Nov 2016	Davis Cup, Zagreb, Croatia	Hard (i)	(Argentina) Juan Martín del Potro (Argentina) Federico Delbonis (Argentina) Leonardo Mayer	(Croatia) Marin Čilić (Croatia) Ivo Karlović (Croatia) Ivan Dodig (Croatia) Franko Škugor	3–2

== ATP Challenger and ITF Futures finals ==
=== Singles: 26 (20 titles, 6 runner–ups) ===
Legend ATP Challenger (13–2) ITF Futures (7–4)	Finals by surface Hard (3–0) Clay (17–6) Grass (0–0) Carpet (0–0)

Result	W–L	Date	Tournament	Tier	Surface	Opponent	Score
Loss	0–1	Aug 2007	ITF Lima, Peru F2	Futures	Clay	(Peru) Matias Silva	6–7^{(6)}, 6–1, 4–6
Loss	0–2	Sep 2007	ITF La Paz, Bolivia F3	Futures	Clay	(Argentina) Guillermo Carry	5–7, 3–6
Win	1–2	Jul 2008	ITF Trujillo, Peru F3	Futures	Clay	(Argentina) Juan-Manuel Valverde	6–0, 6–4
Loss	1–3	Nov 2008	ITF Bahia Bianca, Argentina F15	Futures	Clay	(Argentina) Marco Trungelliti	1–6, 2–6
Win	2–3	Apr 2009	ITF Jujuy, Argentina F1	Futures	Clay	(Chile) Guillermo Rivera Aránguiz	6–3, 6–4
Loss	2–4	May 2009	ITF Córdoba, Argentina F4	Futures	Clay	(Argentina) Juan-Manuel Valverde	3–6, 6–2, 3–6
Win	3–4	Aug 2009	ITF Santa Cruz, Bolivia F1	Futures	Clay	(Argentina) Gaston Giussani	4–6, 6–2, 6–2
Win	4–4	Sep 2009	ITF Cochabamba, Bolivia F2	Futures	Clay	(Spain) Arnau Brugués Davi	6–2, 6–7^{(3)}, 7–6^{(5)}
Win	5–4	Nov 2009	ITF Corrientes, Argentina F25	Futures	Clay	(Argentina) Lionel Noviski	6–3, 6–0
Win	6–4	Jul 2010	ITF Corrientes, Argentina F13	Futures	Clay	(Argentina) Marco Trungelliti	3–6, 6–1, 6–2
Win	7–4	Oct 2011	ITF Cochabamba, Bolivia F2	Futures	Clay	(Argentina) Juan Ignacio Londero	6–4, 6–3
Loss	7–5	Nov 2011	Challenger Ciudad de Guayaquil, Ecuador	Challenger	Clay	(Italy) Matteo Viola	4–6, 1–6
Win	8–5	Mar 2012	Challenger de Salinas Diario Expreso, Ecuador	Challenger	Hard	(Italy) Paolo Lorenzi	1–6, 7–5, 6–3
Win	9–5	Aug 2012	Manta Open, Ecuador	Challenger	Hard	(Argentina) Maximiliano Estévez	6–4, 7–5
Win	10–5	Sep 2012	Campeonato Internacional de Campinas, Brazil	Challenger	Clay	(Brazil) Leonardo Kirche	6–4, 6–0
Win	11–5	Dec 2012	ATP Challenger Finals, Brazil	Challenger	Hard	(Romania) Adrian Ungur	6–3, 6–7^{(4)}, 7–6^{(4)}
Win	12–5	Oct 2013	IS Open São Paulo, Brazil	Challenger	Clay	(Argentina) Facundo Argüello	6–1, 6–0
Win	13–5	Nov 2014	Lima Challenger, Peru	Challenger	Clay	(Australia) Jason Kubler	6–2, 6–4
Win	14–5	Apr 2015	San Luis Open Challenger Tour, Mexico	Challenger	Clay	(Republic of Ireland) James McGee	6–3, 6–3
Win	15–5	May 2015	São Paulo Challenger, Brazil	Challenger	Clay	(Sweden) Christian Lindell	7–5, 7–6^{(1)}
Loss	15–6	May 2015	Heilbronn Neckarcup, Germany	Challenger	Clay	(Germany) Alexander Zverev	1–6, 6–7^{(7)}
Win	16–6	Oct 2015	Aberto do Rio Grande do Sul, Brazil	Challenger	Clay	(Argentina) Diego Schwartzman	6–3, 7–6^{(5)}
Win	17–6	Nov 2015	Montevideo Open, Uruguay	Challenger	Clay	(Spain) Íñigo Cervantes	7–5, 2–6, 6–4
Win	18–6	Jul 2017	Aspria Cup Milan, Italy	Challenger	Clay	(Argentina) Federico Delbonis	6–2, 2–1 ret.
Win	19–6	Aug 2017	Claro Open Floridablanca, Colombia	Challenger	Clay	(Argentina) Facundo Argüello	6–2, 6–4
Win	20–6	Nov 2018	Montevideo Open, Uruguay (2)	Challenger	Clay	(Argentina) Carlos Berlocq	6–3, 3–6, 6–1

=== Doubles: 24 (14 titles, 10 runner–ups) ===
Legend ATP Challenger (6–5) ITF Futures (8–5)	Finals by surface Hard (0–0) Clay (14–10) Grass (0–0) Carpet (0–0)

Result	W–L	Date	Tournament	Tier	Surface	Partner	Opponents	Score
Loss	0–1	Jul 2008	ITF Trujillo, Peru F3	Futures	Clay	(Peru) Sergio Galdós	(Peru) Matias Silva (Peru) Mauricio Echazú	6–2, 1–6, [7–10]
Win	1–1	Nov 2008	ITF Buenos Aires, Argentina F14	Futures	Clay	(Argentina) Andrés Molteni	(Argentina) Alejandro Kon (Argentina) Gonzalo Tur	4–6, 6–3, [10–8]
Win	2–1	Nov 2008	ITF Neuquén, Argentina F16	Futures	Clay	(Argentina) Andrés Molteni	(Argentina) Guillermo Bujniewicz (Argentina) N Jara-Lozano	6–3, 5–7, [14–12]
Win	3–1	Dec 2008	ITF Tucumán, Argentina F17	Futures	Clay	(Argentina) Andrés Molteni	(Argentina) Diego Cristin (Argentina) G-A Grimolizzi	6–7^{(6)}, 7–6^{(13)}, [10–6]
Loss	3–2	Apr 2009	ITF Jujuy, Argentina F1	Futures	Clay	(Argentina) Andrés Molteni	(Argentina) Diego Cristin (Argentina) J-P Amado	5–7, 6–7^{(7)}
Win	4–2	May 2009	ITF Córdoba, Argentina F3	Futures	Clay	(Argentina) Andrés Molteni	(Argentina) German Gaich (Argentina) Guillermo Durán	6–2, 6–4
Win	5–2	Aug 2009	ITF Santa Cruz, Bolivia F1	Futures	Clay	(Argentina) Diego Cristin	(Argentina) J-J Monteferrario (Argentina) Gaston Giussani	6–1, 6–1
Win	6–2	Nov 2009	ITF Corrientes, Argentina F25	Futures	Clay	(Argentina) Andrés Molteni	(Argentina) Jonathan Gonzalia (Argentina) Alejandro Fabbri	6–1, 6–3
Loss	6–3	Nov 2010	ITF Rosario, Argentina F22	Futures	Clay	(Argentina) Andrés Molteni	(Argentina) Diego Cristin (Argentina) Pablo Galdón	3–6, 6–2, [7–10]
Loss	6–4	Nov 2010	Challenger de Buenos Aires, Argentina	Challenger	Clay	(Argentina) Andrés Molteni	(Argentina) Carlos Berlocq (Argentina) Brian Dabul	6–7^{(4)}, 3–6
Loss	6–5	Aug 2011	ITF Arequipa, Perj F1	Futures	Clay	(Uruguay) Martín Cuevas	(Peru) Duilio Beretta (Peru) Sergio Galdós	4–6, 0–6
Win	7–5	Oct 2011	ITF Cochabamba, Bolivia F2	Futures	Clay	(Peru) Sergio Galdós	(Bolivia) Mauricio Doria-Medina (Bolivia) Federico Zeballos	6–3, 6–2
Win	8–5	Oct 2011	ITF Santa Cruz, Bolivia F3	Futures	Clay	(Peru) Sergio Galdós	(Brazil) Felipe Soares (Brazil) Thales Turini	3–6, 6–2, [10–8]
Loss	8–6	Oct 2011	ITF Sucre, Bolivia F4	Futures	Clay	(Peru) Sergio Galdós	(Argentina) J-J Monteferrario (Argentina) Guillermo Carry	6–7^{(3)}, 4–6
Win	9–6	Apr 2012	Seguros Bolívar Open Pereira, Colombia	Challenger	Clay	(Argentina) Martín Alund	(Argentina) Sebastián Decoud (Spain) Rubén Ramírez Hidalgo	6–3, 2–6, [10–5]
Loss	9–7	Oct 2013	IS Open S ão Paulo, Brazil	Challenger	Clay	(Peru) Sergio Galdós	(New Zealand) Artem Sitak (Moldova) Roman Borvanov	4–6, 6–7^{(3)}
Win	10–7	Apr 2014	São Paulo Challenger, Brazil	Challenger	Clay	(Argentina) Diego Schwartzman	(Argentina) Máximo González (Argentina) Andrés Molteni	1–6, 6–3, [10–4]
Loss	10–8	Sep 2014	Seguros Bolívar Open Pereira, Colombia	Challenger	Clay	(Argentina) Horacio Zeballos	(Colombia) Nicolás Barrientos (Colombia) Eduardo Struvay	6–3, 3–6, [9–11]
Win	11–8	Nov 2014	Challenger Ciudad de Guayaquil, Ecuador	Challenger	Clay	(Argentina) Máximo González	(Spain) Pere Riba (Spain) Jordi Samper Montaña	2–6, 7–6^{(3)}, [10–5]
Win	12–8	Nov 2014	Lima Challenger, Peru	Challenger	Clay	(Peru) Sergio Galdós	(Venezuela) Roberto Maytín (Brazil) Marcelo Demoliner	6–3, 6–1
Win	13–8	Mar 2015	Challenger Cachantún Cup, Chile	Challenger	Clay	(Argentina) Andrés Molteni	(Argentina) Máximo González (Argentina) Andrea Collarini	7–6^{(7)}, 3–6, [10–4]
Loss	13–9	Apr 2015	San Luis Open Challenger Tour, Mexico	Challenger	Clay	(Peru) Sergio Galdós	(Argentina) Horacio Zeballos (Argentina) Guillermo Durán	6–7^{(4)}, 4–6
Loss	13–10	Apr 2015	Campeonato Internacional de Santos, Brazil	Challenger	Clay	(Argentina) Andrés Molteni	(Argentina) Máximo González (Venezuela) Roberto Maytín	4–6, 6–7^{(4)}
Win	14–10	May 2015	Vicenza Internazionali, Italy	Challenger	Clay	(Argentina) Facundo Bagnis	(Italy) Salvatore Caruso (Italy) Federico Gaio	6–2, 6–4

== Wins over top 10 players ==
- Pella has a 4–16 record against players who were, at the time the match was played, ranked in the top 10.

Season	2013	...	2017	2018	2019	Total
Wins	1		1	1	1	4

#	Player	Rank	Event	Surface	Rd	Score	GPR
2013
1.	(Serbia) Janko Tipsarević	10	Horse Cup Düsseldorf, Germany	Clay	2R	7–6^{(1)}, 6–1	101
2017
2.	(Austria) Dominic Thiem	7	Chengdu Open, China	Hard	2R	7–6^{(6)}, 6–4	72
2018
3.	(Croatia) Marin Čilić	5	Wimbledon, United Kingdom	Grass	2R	3–6, 1–6, 6–4, 7–6^{(3)}, 7–5	82
2019
4.	(South Africa) Kevin Anderson	8	Wimbledon, United Kingdom	Grass	3R	6–4, 6–3, 7–6^{(4)}	26
