= IS Open de Tênis =

Defunct tennis tournament
- Tour: ATP Challenger Tour (2012–13; 2015)
- Location: São Paulo, Brazil
- Surface: Clay
- Prize money: $50,000

The IS Open de Tênis was a tennis tournament held in São Paulo, Brazil, in 2012, 2013 and 2015. It was held as a Futures tournament in November 2014. The event was part of the ATP Challenger Tour and was played on clay courts.

== Past finals ==
=== Singles ===
Year	Champion	Runner-up	Score
2015	(Argentina) Carlos Berlocq	(Belgium) Kimmer Coppejans	6–3, 6–1
2014	Not Held		
2013	(Chile) Paul Capdeville	(Argentina) Renzo Olivo	6–2, 6–2
2012	(Slovenia) Blaž Kavčič	(Brazil) Júlio Silva	6–3, 7–5

=== Doubles ===
Year	Champions	Runners-up	Score
2015	(Chile) Hans Podlipnik (Brazil) Caio Zampieri	(Argentina) Nicolás Kicker (Argentina) Renzo Olivo	7–5, 6–0
2013	(Brazil) Marcelo Demoliner (Brazil) João Souza	(United States) James Cerretani (France) Pierre-Hugues Herbert	6–2, 4–6, [10–6]
2012	(Chile) Paul Capdeville (Uruguay) Marcel Felder	(Brazil) André Ghem (Brazil) João Pedro Sorgi	7–5, 6–3
