= 2011 BH Tennis Open International Cup – Doubles =

Doubles
- 2011 BH Tennis Open International Cup

Final
- Champions: (Argentina) Guido Andreozzi (Argentina) Eduardo Schwank
- Runners-up: (Brazil) Ricardo Hocevar (Sweden) Christian Lindell
- Score: 6–2, 6–4

Events
Singles	Doubles
← 2010 ·	BH Tennis Open International Cup	· 2012 →

Rodrigo Grilli and Leonardo Kirche were the defending champions but Kirche decided not to participate.
Grilli played alongside André Miele. They reached the semifinals, where Ricardo Hocevar and Christian Lindell eliminated them.

Guido Andreozzi and Eduardo Schwank won this tournament, defeating Hocevar and Lindell 6–2, 6–4 in the final.

== Seeds ==
1. (Brazil) Franco Ferreiro / (Argentina) Máximo González (semifinals)
2. (Argentina) Brian Dabul / (Uruguay) Marcel Felder (quarterfinals)
3. (Brazil) Rogério Dutra da Silva / (Brazil) Júlio Silva (first round)
4. (Brazil) Rodrigo Grilli / (Brazil) André Miele (semifinals)

== Draw ==
=== Key ===
- Q = Qualifier
- WC = Wild card
- LL = Lucky loser
- Alt = Alternate
- SE = Special exempt
- PR = Protected ranking
- ITF = ITF entry
- JE = Junior exempt
- w/o = Walkover
- r = Retired
- d = Defaulted
- SR = Special ranking

=== Draw ===
First round
1	(Brazil) F Ferreiro (Argentina) M González	6	6
(Argentina) M Alund (Brazil) Eládio Ribeiro Neto	4	3
(Argentina) F Bagnis (Argentina) Nicolás Pastor	6	6
(Brazil) Rafael Camilo (Brazil) M Demoliner	3	3
3	(Brazil) R Dutra da Silva (Brazil) J Silva	7^{7}	1	[10]
(Argentina) G Andreozzi (Argentina) E Schwank	6^{4}	6	[12]
(Argentina) P Galdón (Argentina) Marco Trungelliti	6	7^{8}
(Uruguay) M Cuevas (Argentina) Kevin Konfederak	2	6^{6}
(Argentina) Cristián Benedetti (Germany) P Gojowczyk	1	0
(Argentina) Guillermo Durán (France) L Recouderc	6	6
WC	(Portugal) G Elias (Brazil) M Torres	6	1	[2]
4	(Brazil) R Grilli (Brazil) A Miele	3	6	[10]
(Brazil) R Hocevar (Sweden) C Lindell	7^{7}	6
WC	(Brazil) T Fernandes (Brazil) T Moura Monteiro	6^{2}	2
(Brazil) Fabiano de Paula (Brazil) Gabriel Dias	2	1
2	(Argentina) B Dabul (Uruguay) M Felder	6	6

Quarterfinals
1	(Brazil) F Ferreiro (Argentina) M González	6	6
(Argentina) F Bagnis (Argentina) N Pastor	4	2
(Argentina) G Andreozzi (Argentina) E Schwank	6	6
(Argentina) P Galdón (Argentina) M Trungelliti	2	3
(Argentina) Guillermo Durán (France) L Recouderc	5	5
4	(Brazil) R Grilli (Brazil) A Miele	7	7
(Brazil) R Hocevar (Sweden) C Lindell	7^{7}	6
2	(Argentina) B Dabul (Uruguay) M Felder	6^{5}	4

Semifinals
1	(Brazil) F Ferreiro (Argentina) M González	4	3
(Argentina) G Andreozzi (Argentina) E Schwank	6	6
4	(Brazil) R Grilli (Brazil) A Miele	6^{2}	6	[7]
(Brazil) R Hocevar (Sweden) C Lindell	7^{4}	3	[10]

Final
(Argentina) G Andreozzi (Argentina) E Schwank	6	6
(Brazil) R Hocevar (Sweden) C Lindell	4	2
