= 2010 BH Tennis Open International Cup – Doubles =

Doubles
- 2010 BH Tennis Open International Cup

Final
- Champions: (Brazil) Rodrigo Grilli (Brazil) Leonardo Kirche
- Runners-up: (Sweden) Christian Lindell (Brazil) João Souza
- Score: 6–3, 6–3

Events
Singles	Doubles
← 2009 ·	BH Tennis Open International Cup	· 2011 →

Márcio Torres and Izak van der Merwe were the defending champions but decided not to participate.
Rodrigo Grilli and Leonardo Kirche defeated Christian Lindell and João Souza 6–3, 6–3 in the final.

== Seeds ==
First-seeded pair received a bye in the first round.

1. (Brazil) Rogério Dutra da Silva / (Brazil) Júlio Silva (quarterfinals)
2. (Brazil) Ricardo Hocevar / (Brazil) André Miele (quarterfinals)
3. (Argentina) Juan Pablo Brzezicki / (United States) John Paul Fruttero (first round)
4. (Argentina) Facundo Bagnis / (Argentina) Andrés Molteni (semifinals)

== Draw ==
=== Key ===
- Q = Qualifier
- WC = Wild card
- LL = Lucky loser
- Alt = Alternate
- SE = Special exempt
- PR = Protected ranking
- ITF = ITF entry
- JE = Junior exempt
- w/o = Walkover
- r = Retired
- d = Defaulted
- SR = Special ranking

=== Draw ===
First round
(Argentina) P Galdón (Argentina) J-M Valverde	6	7
WC	(Brazil) G Dias (Brazil) T Fernandes	3	6^{2}
3	(Argentina) JP Brzezicki (United States) JP Fruttero	4	3
(Uruguay) M Felder (Argentina) G Pella	6	6
(Sweden) C Lindell (Brazil) J Souza	6	6
(Argentina) G Durán (Argentina) M Trungelliti	1	3
(Brazil) J Pereira (Brazil) E Ribeiro Neto	2	6^{1}
(Chile) P Capdeville (Chile) G Rivera-Aránguiz	6	7
WC	(Argentina) F Argüello (Argentina) F Mena	6^{3}	2
4	(Argentina) F Bagnis (Argentina) A Molteni	7	6
(Brazil) R Grilli (Brazil) L Kirche	6	6
(Chile) J Aguilar (Chile) C Saavedra-Corvalán	1	3
(Brazil) R Guidolin (Brazil) F Romboli	6^{5}	5
2	(Brazil) R Hocevar (Brazil) A Miele	7	7

Quarterfinals
1	(Brazil) R Dutra da Silva (Brazil) J Silva	6^{5}	5
(Argentina) P Galdón (Argentina) J-M Valverde	7	7
(Uruguay) M Felder (Argentina) G Pella	2	6	[8]
(Sweden) C Lindell (Brazil) J Souza	6	3	[10]
(Chile) P Capdeville (Chile) G Rivera-Aránguiz	w/o
4	(Argentina) F Bagnis (Argentina) A Molteni
(Brazil) R Grilli (Brazil) L Kirche	3	7	[10]
2	(Brazil) R Hocevar (Brazil) A Miele	6	5	[6]

Semifinals
(Argentina) P Galdón (Argentina) J-M Valverde	2	7	[4]
(Sweden) C Lindell (Brazil) J Souza	6	5	[10]
4	(Argentina) F Bagnis (Argentina) A Molteni	3	6	[7]
(Brazil) R Grilli (Brazil) L Kirche	6	1	[10]

Finals
(Sweden) C Lindell (Brazil) J Souza	3	3
(Brazil) R Grilli (Brazil) L Kirche	6	6
