= 2009 BH Tennis Open International Cup – Doubles =

Doubles
- 2009 BH Tennis Open International Cup

Final
- Champions: (Brazil) Márcio Torres (South Africa) Izak van der Merwe
- Runners-up: (Argentina) Juan-Pablo Amado (Argentina) Eduardo Schwank
- Score: walkover

Events
Singles	Doubles
← 2008 ·	BH Tennis Open International Cup	· 2010 →

Santiago González and Aisam-ul-Haq Qureshi were the defending champions, but Qureshi chose to not play this year.
González participated with Horacio Zeballos, but they lost to Torres and van der Merwe in the semifinal.
Márcio Torres and Izak van der Merwe became the new champions, after withdrawal of Juan-Pablo Amado and Eduardo Schwank before the final match.

== Seeds ==
1. (Mexico) Santiago González / (Argentina) Horacio Zeballos (semifinals)
2. (Brazil) Júlio Silva / (Brazil) Rogério Dutra da Silva (quarterfinals)
3. (Dominican Republic) Víctor Estrella / (Brazil) João Souza (semifinals)
4. (Brazil) Márcio Torres / (South Africa) Izak van der Merwe (champions)

== Draw ==
=== Key ===
- Q = Qualifier
- WC = Wild card
- LL = Lucky loser
- Alt = Alternate
- SE = Special exempt
- PR = Protected ranking
- ITF = ITF entry
- JE = Junior exempt
- w/o = Walkover
- r = Retired
- d = Defaulted
- SR = Special ranking

=== Draw ===
First round
1	(Mexico) S González (Argentina) H Zeballos	6	6
WC	(Brazil) G Dias (Brazil) J Pereira	4	2
(Brazil) A Bonatto (Brazil) L Kirche	7	3	[10]
WC	(United States) JP Fruttero (United States) G Hill	5	6	[5]
4	(Brazil) M Torres (South Africa) I van der Merwe	4	6	[11]
(Brazil) E Gomes (Brazil) A Miele	6	0	[9]
(Brazil) M Demoliner (Brazil) R Guidolin	6	6^{4}	[10]
(United Kingdom) J Goodall (Australia) S Groth	4	7	[2]
WC	(Brazil) R Bucalem (Brazil) R Hocevar	4	2
(Mexico) B Echagaray (Brazil) C Zampieri	6	6
(France) D Guez (Denmark) K Pless	2	6	[7]
3	(Dominican Republic) V Estrella (Brazil) J Souza	6	3	[10]
(Argentina) Juan-Pablo Amado (Argentina) E Schwank	6	6
(Brazil) R Camilo (Uruguay) M Felder	4	4
(India) A Singh (India) V Vardhan	6^{2}	5
2	(Brazil) J Silva (Brazil) R Dutra da Silva	7	7

Quarterfinals
1	(Mexico) S González (Argentina) H Zeballos	6	6
(Brazil) A Bonatto (Brazil) L Kirche	4	1
4	(Brazil) M Torres (South Africa) I van der Merwe	6	6
(Brazil) M Demoliner (Brazil) R Guidolin	0	0
(Mexico) B Echagaray (Brazil) C Zampieri	6^{5}	6	[6]
3	(Dominican Republic) V Estrella (Brazil) J Souza	7	2	[10]
(Argentina) J-P Amado (Argentina) E Schwank	6	6^{3}	[10]
2	(Brazil) J Silva (Brazil) R Dutra da Silva	4	7	[8]

Semifinals
1	(Mexico) S González (Argentina) H Zeballos	5	5
4	(Brazil) M Torres (South Africa) I van der Merwe	7	7
3	(Dominican Republic) V Estrella (Brazil) J Souza	2	4
(Argentina) J-P Amado (Argentina) E Schwank	6	6

Finals
4	(Brazil) M Torres (South Africa) I van der Merwe
(Argentina) J-P Amado (Argentina) E Schwank	w/o
