= 2009 BH Tennis Open International Cup – Singles =

Singles
- 2009 BH Tennis Open International Cup

Final
- Champion: (Brazil) Júlio Silva
- Runner-up: (Argentina) Eduardo Schwank
- Score: 4–6, 6–3, 6–4

Events
Singles	Doubles
← 2008 ·	BH Tennis Open International Cup	· 2010 →

Santiago González was the defending champion, but he lost to the eventual the winner of tournament, Júlio Silva in the second round.
Silva defeated Eduardo Schwank 4–6, 6–3, 6–4 in the final.

== Seeds ==
1. (Brazil) Thiago Alves (quarterfinals)
2. (Argentina) Horacio Zeballos (first round)
3. (Mexico) Santiago González (second round)
4. (Brazil) Ricardo Hocevar (quarterfinals)
5. (United Kingdom) Joshua Goodall (first round)
6. (Argentina) Eduardo Schwank (final)
7. (Brazil) João Souza (first round)

== Draw ==
=== Key ===
- Q = Qualifier
- WC = Wild card
- LL = Lucky loser
- Alt = Alternate
- SE = Special exempt
- PR = Protected ranking
- ITF = ITF entry
- JE = Junior exempt
- w/o = Walkover
- r = Retired
- d = Defaulted
- SR = Special ranking

=== Final four ===
Semifinals
LL	(Spain) Guillermo Alcaide	3	4
(Brazil) Júlio Silva	6	6
6	(Argentina) Eduardo Schwank	6	3	6
(Brazil) Caio Zampieri	3	6	2

Final
(Brazil) Júlio Silva	4	6	6
6	(Argentina) Eduardo Schwank	6	3	4

=== Top half ===
First round
1	(Brazil) T Alves	7	6
Q	(Peru) I Miranda	5	4
(Uruguay) J-P Amado	2	0	r
(Uruguay) M Felder	6	1
(Australia) S Groth	5	4
Q	(United States) JP Fruttero	7	6
WC	(Brazil) G Dias	2	5
LL	(Spain) G Alcaide	6	7
3	(Mexico) S González	6	6
(Brazil) L Kirche	4	1
(Brazil) J Silva	6	6
WC	(Brazil) J Pereira	2	1
(Denmark) K Pless	6	6
(Brazil) E Gomes	4	1
(Brazil) R Mello	7	6
7	(Brazil) J Souza	5	3

Second round
1	(Brazil) T Alves	6	6
(Uruguay) M Felder	2	3
Q	(United States) JP Fruttero	4	4
LL	(Spain) G Alcaide	6	6
3	(Mexico) S González	5	2
(Brazil) J Silva	7	6
(Denmark) K Pless	7	1	6
(Brazil) R Mello	6^{5}	6	3

Quarterfinals
1	(Brazil) T Alves	2	6	6^{4}
LL	(Spain) G Alcaide	6	3	7
(Brazil) J Silva	6	6
(Denmark) K Pless	3	2

Semifinals
LL	(Spain) G Alcaide	3	4
(Brazil) J Silva	6	6

=== Bottom half ===
First round
6	(Argentina) E Schwank	7	7
(Mexico) B Echagaray	5	6^{6}
(South Africa) I van der Merwe	6	3	6
Q	(New Zealand) D King-Turner	3	6	3
Q	(Brazil) R Guidolin	4	2
(Brazil) A Miele	6	6
WC	(United States) G Hill	2	3
4	(Brazil) R Hocevar	6	6
5	(United Kingdom) J Goodall	6	6^{3}	3
(Brazil) R Dutra da Silva	4	7	6
(Dominican Republic) V Estrella	5	6^{5}
(Brazil) C Zampieri	7	7
(France) D Guez	6	6
WC	(Brazil) M Torres	2	1
(Brazil) M Demoliner	6	6
2	(Argentina) H Zeballos	0	3

Second round
6	(Argentina) E Schwank	6	7
(South Africa) I van der Merwe	3	6^{2}
(Brazil) A Miele	4	3
4	(Brazil) R Hocevar	6	6
(Brazil) R Dutra da Silva	2	2
(Brazil) C Zampieri	6	6
(France) D Guez	6^{6}	6	6
(Brazil) M Demoliner	7	2	2

Quarterfinals
6	(Argentina) E Schwank	6	6^{6}	6
4	(Brazil) R Hocevar	4	7	4
(Brazil) C Zampieri	6	6
(France) D Guez	4	2

Semifinals
6	(Argentina) E Schwank	6	3	6
(Brazil) C Zampieri	3	6	2
