= 2011 BH Tennis Open International Cup – Singles =

Singles
- 2011 BH Tennis Open International Cup

Final
- Champion: (Brazil) Júlio Silva
- Runner-up: (Portugal) Gastão Elias
- Score: 6–4, 6–4

Events
Singles	Doubles
← 2010 ·	BH Tennis Open International Cup	· 2012 →

Rogério Dutra da Silva was the defending champion, but Ricardo Hocevar eliminated him in the quarterfinals.

4th seed Júlio Silva won the tournament, defeating Christian Lindell, Marcelo Demoliner, Eládio Ribeiro Neto, Ricardo Hocevar and Gastão Elias in the final.

== Seeds ==
1. (Argentina) Máximo González (quarterfinals)
2. (Brazil) Rogério Dutra da Silva (quarterfinals)
3. (Argentina) Brian Dabul (second round)
4. (Brazil) Júlio Silva (champion)
5. (Argentina) Facundo Bagnis (first round)
6. (Argentina) Eduardo Schwank (semifinals)
7. (Brazil) Ricardo Hocevar (semifinals)
8. (Portugal) Gastão Elias (final)

== Draw ==
=== Key ===
- Q = Qualifier
- WC = Wild card
- LL = Lucky loser
- Alt = Alternate
- SE = Special exempt
- PR = Protected ranking
- ITF = ITF entry
- JE = Junior exempt
- w/o = Walkover
- r = Retired
- d = Defaulted
- SR = Special ranking

=== Finals ===
Semifinals
6	(Argentina) Eduardo Schwank	3	6^{6}
8	(Portugal) Gastão Elias	6	7^{8}
4	(Brazil) Júlio Silva	3	7^{7}	6
7	(Brazil) Ricardo Hocevar	6	6^{3}	4

Final
8	(Portugal) Gastão Elias	4	4
4	(Brazil) Júlio Silva	6	6

=== Top half ===
First round
1	(Argentina) M González	6	6
Q	(Argentina) Kevin Konfederak	3	1
WC	(Brazil) Richard Arlindo	1	2
(Argentina) P Galdón	6	6
(Argentina) Guillermo Durán	1	7	7
WC	(Brazil) Gabriel Dias	6	5	5
Q	(Brazil) Fabiano de Paula	5	5
6	(Argentina) E Schwank	7	7
3	(Argentina) B Dabul	6	6
WC	(Brazil) T Moura Monteiro	2	3
(Brazil) T Fernandes	2	7^{7}	4
(Argentina) Marco Trungelliti	6	6^{4}	6
(Germany) P Gojowczyk	7	1	6
(France) L Recouderc	5	6	0
(Argentina) M Alund	6	4	3
8	(Portugal) G Elias	1	6	6

Second round
1	(Argentina) M González	6	6^{4}	6
(Argentina) P Galdón	3	7^{7}	2
(Argentina) G Durán	0	0
6	(Argentina) E Schwank	6	6
3	(Argentina) B Dabul	6^{6}	3
(Argentina) M Trungelliti	7^{8}	6
(Germany) P Gojowczyk	5	1
8	(Portugal) G Elias	7	6

Quarterfinals
1	(Argentina) M González	3	6^{4}
6	(Argentina) E Schwank	6	7^{7}
(Argentina) M Trungelliti	6^{4}	6	6^{4}
8	(Portugal) G Elias	7^{7}	2	7^{7}

Semifinals
6	(Argentina) E Schwank	3	6^{6}
8	(Portugal) G Elias	6	7^{8}

=== Bottom half ===
First round
5	(Argentina) F Bagnis	4	4
(Argentina) Nicolás Pastor	6	6
(Brazil) Eládio Ribeiro Neto	6	7
Q	(Uruguay) M Cuevas	3	5
(Brazil) M Demoliner	6	6
WC	(Brazil) M Torres	3	2
(Sweden) C Lindell	6	4	5
4	(Brazil) J Silva	3	6	7
7	(Brazil) R Hocevar	2	6	6
(Brazil) A Miele	6	3	2
(Argentina) Cristián Benedetti	6	6
Q	(Brazil) Carlos Oliveira	3	1
(Argentina) Guido Andreozzi	6	3	3
(Uruguay) M Felder	2	6	6
(Brazil) Rafael Camilo	7	6^{4}	2
2	(Brazil) R Dutra da Silva	5	7^{7}	6

Second round
(Argentina) N Pastor	3	6^{5}
(Brazil) E Ribeiro Neto	6	7^{7}
(Brazil) M Demoliner	7	6^{6}	6^{3}
4	(Brazil) J Silva	5	7^{8}	7^{7}
7	(Brazil) R Hocevar	6^{5}	6	6
(Argentina) C Benedetti	7^{7}	1	2
(Uruguay) M Felder	4	0
2	(Brazil) R Dutra da Silva	6	6

Quarterfinals
(Brazil) E Ribeiro Neto	2	3
4	(Brazil) J Silva	6	6
7	(Brazil) R Hocevar	6	6^{2}	6
2	(Brazil) R Dutra da Silva	3	7^{7}	3

Semifinals
4	(Brazil) J Silva	3	7^{7}	6
7	(Brazil) R Hocevar	6	6^{3}	4
