= 2010 BH Tennis Open International Cup – Singles =

Singles
- 2010 BH Tennis Open International Cup

Final
- Champion: (Brazil) Rogério Dutra da Silva
- Runner-up: (Argentina) Facundo Argüello
- Score: 6–4, 6–3

Events
Singles	Doubles
← 2009 ·	BH Tennis Open International Cup	· 2011 →

Júlio Silva was the defending champion, but he lost to his compatriot, qualifier Rodrigo Guidolin in the quarterfinals.
Rogério Dutra da Silva won the final against Facundo Argüello 6–4, 6–3.

== Seeds ==
1. (Argentina) Brian Dabul (first round)
2. (Paraguay) Ramón Delgado (first round)
3. (Brazil) João Souza (first round)
4. (Chile) Jorge Aguilar (second round)
5. (Argentina) Juan Pablo Brzezicki (second round)
6. (Brazil) Caio Zampieri (first round)
7. (Chile) Paul Capdeville (second round)
8. (Brazil) Júlio Silva (quarterfinals)

== Draw ==
=== Key ===
- Q = Qualifier
- WC = Wild card
- LL = Lucky loser
- Alt = Alternate
- SE = Special exempt
- PR = Protected ranking
- ITF = ITF entry
- JE = Junior exempt
- w/o = Walkover
- r = Retired
- d = Defaulted
- SR = Special ranking

=== Finals ===
Semifinals
(Argentina) Facundo Bagnis	4	2
(Argentina) Facundo Argüello	6	6
Q	(Brazil) Rodrigo Guidolin	6	6^{6}	6^{4}
(Brazil) Rogério Dutra da Silva	4	7	7

Final
(Argentina) Facundo Argüello	4	3
(Brazil) Rogério Dutra da Silva	6	6

=== Top half ===
First round
1	(Argentina) B Dabul	6	6	4
(Argentina) A Molteni	7	4	6
(Brazil) L Kirche	6	6
Q	(Brazil) J Pereira	2	4
(Argentina) F Bagnis	6	6
WC	(Brazil) T Fernandes	3	3
Q	(Portugal) G Elias	4	2
7	(Chile) P Capdeville	6	6
3	(Brazil) J Souza	7	4	4
(Brazil) R Hocevar	5	6	6
WC	(Brazil) Gabriel Dias	3	4
Q	(Brazil) A Miele	6	6
WC	(Sweden) C Lindell	6	6
(Uruguay) M Felder	3	2
(Argentina) F Argüello	1	6	6
6	(Brazil) C Zampieri	6	3	2

Second round
(Argentina) A Molteni	5	4
(Brazil) L Kirche	7	6
(Argentina) F Bagnis	6	3
7	(Chile) P Capdeville	4	0	r
(Brazil) R Hocevar	7	6
Q	(Brazil) A Miele	6^{5}	2
WC	(Sweden) C Lindell	3	6^{2}
(Argentina) F Argüello	6	7

Quarterfinals
(Brazil) L Kirche	3	4
(Argentina) F Bagnis	6	6
(Brazil) R Hocevar	3	3
(Argentina) F Argüello	6	6

Semifinals
(Argentina) F Bagnis	4	2
(Argentina) F Argüello	6	6

=== Bottom half ===
First round
8	(Brazil) J Silva	7	6
(Chile) G Rivera Aránguiz	5	3
(Brazil) Eladio Ribeiro Neto	6	3	6^{3}
(Brazil) F Romboli	3	6	7
(Argentina) P Galdón	6^{2}	3
Q	(Brazil) R Guidolin	7	6
(Argentina) Guillermo Durán	2	6	0
4	(Chile) J Aguilar	6	4	6
5	(Argentina) JP Brzezicki	6^{6}	6	6
(Chile) C Saavedra Corvalán	7	3	2
(Brazil) R Dutra da Silva	6	6
WC	(Brazil) A Laranja	4	4
(Argentina) Juan-Manuel Valverde	4	6	6
(Argentina) Guido Pella	6	2	7
(Argentina) Marco Trungelliti	6	5	6
2	(Paraguay) R Delgado	2	7	3

Second round
8	(Brazil) J Silva	6	2	6
(Brazil) F Romboli	2	6	3
Q	(Brazil) R Guidolin	7	3	7
4	(Chile) J Aguilar	6^{2}	6	6^{5}
5	(Argentina) JP Brzezicki	6^{2}	6^{4}
(Brazil) R Dutra da Silva	7	7
(Argentina) G Pella	0	3
(Argentina) M Trungelliti	6	6

Quarterfinals
8	(Brazil) J Silva	7	5	4
Q	(Brazil) R Guidolin	6^{5}	7	6
(Brazil) R Dutra da Silva	7	4	7
(Argentina) M Trungelliti	5	6	6^{2}

Semifinals
Q	(Brazil) R Guidolin	6	6^{6}	6^{4}
(Brazil) R Dutra da Silva	4	7	7
