= 2009 BH Tennis Open International Cup =

- Date: July 27 – August 2
- Edition: 18th
- Location: Belo Horizonte, Brazil

Champions

Singles
- (Brazil) Júlio Silva

Doubles
- (Brazil) Márcio Torres / (South Africa) Izak van der Merwe
← 2008 ·	BH Tennis Open International Cup	· 2010 →

The 2009 BH Tennis Open International Cup was a professional tennis tournament played on Hard courts. This was the eighteenth edition of the tournament which is part of the 2009 ATP Challenger Tour. It took place in Belo Horizonte, Brazil between 27 July and 2 August 2009.

== Singles main draw entrants ==
=== Seeds ===
Nationality	Player	Ranking*	Seeding
BRA	Thiago Alves	88	1
ARG	Horacio Zeballos	113	2
MEX	Santiago González	182	3
BRA	Ricardo Hocevar	191	4
GBR	Joshua Goodall	193	5
ARG	Eduardo Schwank	198	6
BRA	João Souza	201	7

- Rankings are as of July 20, 2009.

=== Other entrants ===
The following players received wildcards into the singles main draw:

- (Brazil) Gabriel Dias
- (United States) Gregg Hill
- (Brazil) José Pereira
- (Brazil) Márcio Torres

The following players received entry from the qualifying draw:

- (Spain) Guillermo Alcaide (as a Lucky Loser)
- (United States) John Paul Fruttero
- (Brazil) Rodrigo Guidolin
- (New Zealand) Daniel King-Turner
- (Peru) Iván Miranda

== Champions ==
=== Singles ===
(Brazil) Júlio Silva def. (Argentina) Eduardo Schwank, 4–6, 6–3, 6–4

=== Doubles ===
(Brazil) Márcio Torres / (South Africa) Izak van der Merwe def. (Argentina) Juan-Pablo Amado / (Argentina) Eduardo Schwank, walkover
