= 2011 BH Tennis Open International Cup =

- Date: 12–18 September
- Edition: 20th
- Location: Belo Horizonte, Brazil

Champions

Singles
- (Brazil) Júlio Silva

Doubles
- (Argentina) Guido Andreozzi / (Argentina) Eduardo Schwank
← 2010 ·	BH Tennis Open International Cup	· 2012 →

The 2011 BH Tennis Open International Cup was a professional tennis tournament played on clay courts. It was the 20th edition of the tournament which was part of the 2011 ATP Challenger Tour. It took place in Belo Horizonte, Brazil between 12 and 18 September 2011.

== ATP entrants ==
=== Seeds ===
Country	Player	Rank^{1}	Seed
ARG	Máximo González	109	1
BRA	Rogério Dutra da Silva	114	2
ARG	Brian Dabul	157	3
BRA	Júlio Silva	164	4
ARG	Facundo Bagnis	171	5
ARG	Eduardo Schwank	208	6
BRA	Ricardo Hocevar	249	7
POR	Gastão Elias	275	8

- ^{1} Rankings are as of August 29, 2011.

=== Other entrants ===
The following players received wildcards into the singles main draw:

- (Brazil) Richard Arlindo
- (Brazil) Gabriel Dias
- (Brazil) Thiago Moura Monteiro
- (Brazil) Márcio Torres

The following players received entry from the qualifying draw:

- (Brazil) Fabiano de Paula
- (Uruguay) Martín Cuevas
- (Argentina) Kevin Konfederak
- (Brazil) Carlos Oliveira

== Champions ==
=== Singles ===
(Brazil) Júlio Silva def. (Portugal) Gastão Elias, 6–4, 6–4

=== Doubles ===
(Argentina) Guido Andreozzi / (Argentina) Eduardo Schwank def. (Brazil) Ricardo Hocevar / (Sweden) Christian Lindell, 6–2, 6–4
