= 2011 Brasil Open – Singles Qualifying =

This article displays the qualifying draw of the 2011 Brasil Open.

== Players ==
=== Seeds ===
1. (Portugal) Frederico Gil (second round)
2. (Portugal) Rui Machado (moved to Main Draw)
3. (Argentina) Leonardo Mayer (qualified)
4. (Spain) Albert Ramos Viñolas (first round)
5. (Argentina) Federico Delbonis (second round)
6. (Spain) Daniel Muñoz de la Nava (second round)
7. (Argentina) Diego Junqueira (second round)
8. (Australia) Peter Luczak (qualifying competition)

=== Qualifiers ===
1. (Argentina) Facundo Bagnis
2. (Brazil) Rogério Dutra da Silva
3. (Argentina) Leonardo Mayer
4. (Brazil) André Ghem

== Qualifying draw ==
=== First qualifier ===
First Round
1	(Portugal) Frederico Gil	6	6
(Brazil) Fabiano de Paula	2	2
(Brazil) André Miele	6^{0}	3
(Portugal) Leonardo Tavares	7	6
(Argentina) Facundo Bagnis	6	6
WC	(Brazil) Augusto Laranja	2	3
(Brazil) Alexandre Schnitman	1	3
5	(Argentina) Federico Delbonis	6	6

Second Round
1	(Portugal) Frederico Gil	6	4	4
(Portugal) Leonardo Tavares	3	6	6
(Argentina) Facundo Bagnis	4	6	6
5	(Argentina) Federico Delbonis	6	2	4

Qualifying Competition
(Portugal) Leonardo Tavares	4	3
(Argentina) Facundo Bagnis	6	6

=== Second qualifier ===
First Round
Alt	(Brazil) Thiago Monteiro	3	1
(Argentina) Juan Pablo Brzezicki	6	6
(Brazil) Rogério Dutra da Silva	6	6
(Argentina) Martín Vassallo Argüello	1	3
(Brazil) Bruno Semenzato	2	4
(Brazil) Leonardo Kirche	6	6
(Brazil) Júlio Silva	4	4
8	(Australia) Peter Luczak	6	6

Second Round
(Argentina) Juan Pablo Brzezicki	4	6	1
(Brazil) Rogério Dutra da Silva	6	1	6
(Brazil) Leonardo Kirche	2	6
8	(Australia) Peter Luczak	6	7

Qualifying Competition
(Brazil) Rogério Dutra da Silva	6	1	6
8	(Australia) Peter Luczak	4	6	2

=== Third qualifier ===
First Round
3	(Argentina) Leonardo Mayer	6	6
(Brazil) Rafael Camilo	4	3
(Romania) Adrian Ungur	6	6
(Czech Republic) František Čermák	3	2
(Brazil) Ricardo Hocevar	6	7
(Argentina) José Acasuso	1	5
WC	(Brazil) Karue Sell	6^{5}	3
6	(Spain) Daniel Muñoz de la Nava	7	6

Second Round
3	(Argentina) Leonardo Mayer	7	6
(Romania) Adrian Ungur	5	3
(Brazil) Ricardo Hocevar	4	6	6
6	(Spain) Daniel Muñoz de la Nava	6	3	2

Qualifying Competition
3	(Argentina) Leonardo Mayer	6	6
(Brazil) Ricardo Hocevar	2	1

=== Fourth qualifier ===
First Round
4	(Spain) Albert Ramos Viñolas	3	2
(Brazil) Caio Zampieri	6	6
(Spain) Iván Navarro	6	7
(Brazil) Daniel Dutra da Silva	4	5
WC	(Brazil) Bruno Sant'Anna	1	6	1
(Brazil) André Ghem	6	3	6
(United Kingdom) Morgan Phillips	6	3	5
7	(Argentina) Diego Junqueira	2	6	7

Second Round
(Brazil) Caio Zampieri	6^{4}	6^{5}
(Spain) Iván Navarro	7	7
(Brazil) André Ghem	6	6
7	(Argentina) Diego Junqueira	3	0

Qualifying Competition
(Spain) Iván Navarro	6	3	4
(Brazil) André Ghem	2	6	6
