= 2010 BH Tennis Open International Cup =

- Date: September 13 – 19
- Edition: 19th
- Location: Belo Horizonte, Brazil

Champions

Singles
- (Brazil) Rogério Dutra da Silva

Doubles
- (Brazil) Rodrigo Grilli / (Brazil) Leonardo Kirche
← 2009 ·	BH Tennis Open International Cup	· 2011 →

The 2010 BH Tennis Open International Cup was a professional tennis tournament played on Hard courts. This was the nineteenth edition of the tournament which is part of the 2010 ATP Challenger Tour. It took place in Belo Horizonte, Brazil between 13 and 19 September 2010.

== Singles main draw entrants ==
=== Seeds ===
Nationality	Player	Ranking*	Seeding
ARG	Brian Dabul	96	1
PAR	Ramón Delgado	133	2
BRA	João Souza	134	3
CHI	Jorge Aguilar	173	4
ARG	Juan Pablo Brzezicki	199	5
BRA	Caio Zampieri	203	6
CHI	Paul Capdeville	219	7
BRA	Júlio Silva	228	8

- Rankings are as of September 30, 2010.

=== Other entrants ===
The following players received wildcards into the singles main draw:

- (Brazil) Gabriel Dias
- (Brazil) Tiago Fernandes
- (Brazil) Augusto Laranja
- (Sweden) Christian Lindell

The following players received entry from the qualifying draw:

- (Portugal) Gastão Elias
- (Brazil) Rodrigo Guidolin
- (Brazil) André Miele
- (Brazil) José Pereira

== Champions ==
=== Singles ===
(Brazil) Rogério Dutra da Silva def. (Argentina) Facundo Argüello, 6–4, 6–3

=== Doubles ===
(Brazil) Rodrigo Grilli / (Brazil) Leonardo Kirche def. (Sweden) Christian Lindell / (Brazil) João Souza, 6–3, 6–3
