= Diego Matos =

Brazilian footballer (born 1997)

Personal information
- Full name: Diego Daniel Rodrigues de Matos
- Date of birth: 8 January 1997 (age 29)
- Place of birth: Belém, Brazil
- Height: 1.60 m (5 ft 3 in)
- Position: Left back

Team information
- Current team: Floresta
- Number: 6

Youth career
- 2010–2018: Paysandu

Senior career*
Years	Team	Apps	(Gls)
2018–2021	Paysandu	73	(3)
2022	Avaí	10	(0)
2023–2024	Náutico	41	(0)
2025–	Floresta	38	(0)
- * Club domestic league appearances and goals as of 9 November 2026

Diego Daniel Rodrigues de Matos (born 8 January 1997), known as Diego Matos, is a Brazilian footballer who plays as a left back for Náutico.

== Club career ==
Born in Belém, Pará, Diego Matos joined Paysandu's youth setup in 2010, aged 13. He made his first team debut on 24 July 2018, coming on as a second-half substitute for Mateus Müller in a 1–0 Série B home win over Guarani.

Diego Matos became a regular starter for the club afterwards, and agreed to a pre-contract with Avaí on 13 July 2021. He was presented at his new club the following 12 January, after agreeing to a 18-month deal.

== Career statistics ==
As of 16 February 2022

Club	Season	League			State League		Cup		Continental		Other		Total	
Club	Season	Division	Apps	Goals	Apps	Goals	Apps	Goals	Apps	Goals	Apps	Goals	Apps	Goals
Paysandu	2018	Série B	8	0	0	0	0	0	—		—		8	0
Paysandu	2019	Série C	6	0	8	1	0	0	—		2 (Note: Appearance(s) in Copa Verde)	0	16	1
Paysandu	2020	Série C	16	1	7	0	0	0	—		2	0	25	1
Paysandu	2021	Série C	19	1	9	0	1	0	—		3	0	32	1
Paysandu	Total		49	2	24	1	1	0	—		7	0	81	3
Avaí	2022	Série A	0	0	6	0	0	0	—		1 (Note: Appearance(s) in Recopa Catarinense)	0	7	0
Career total			49	2	30	1	1	0	0	0	8	0	88	3

== Honours ==
Paysandu

- Campeonato Paraense: 2020, 2021
