= BH Tennis Open International Cup =

ATP Challenger Tour
- Event name: Belo Horizonte
- Location: Belo Horizonte, Brazil
- Category: ATP Challenger Tour
- Surface: Hard
- Draw: 32S/32Q/16D
- Prize money: $35,000+H
- Website: www.bhopen.com.br

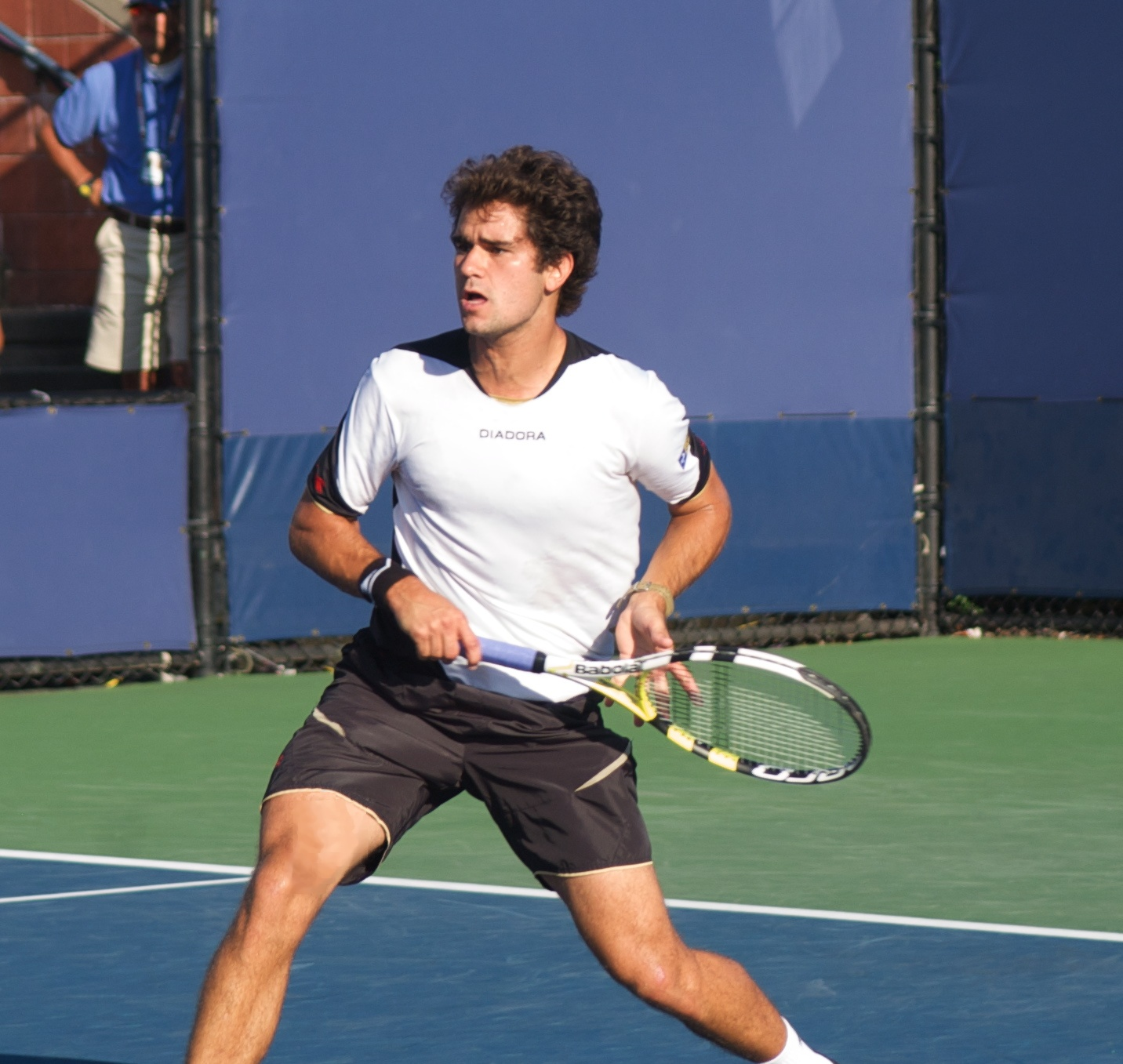
Thiago Alves is one of eight Brazilian players to have won the singles event in seventeen editions

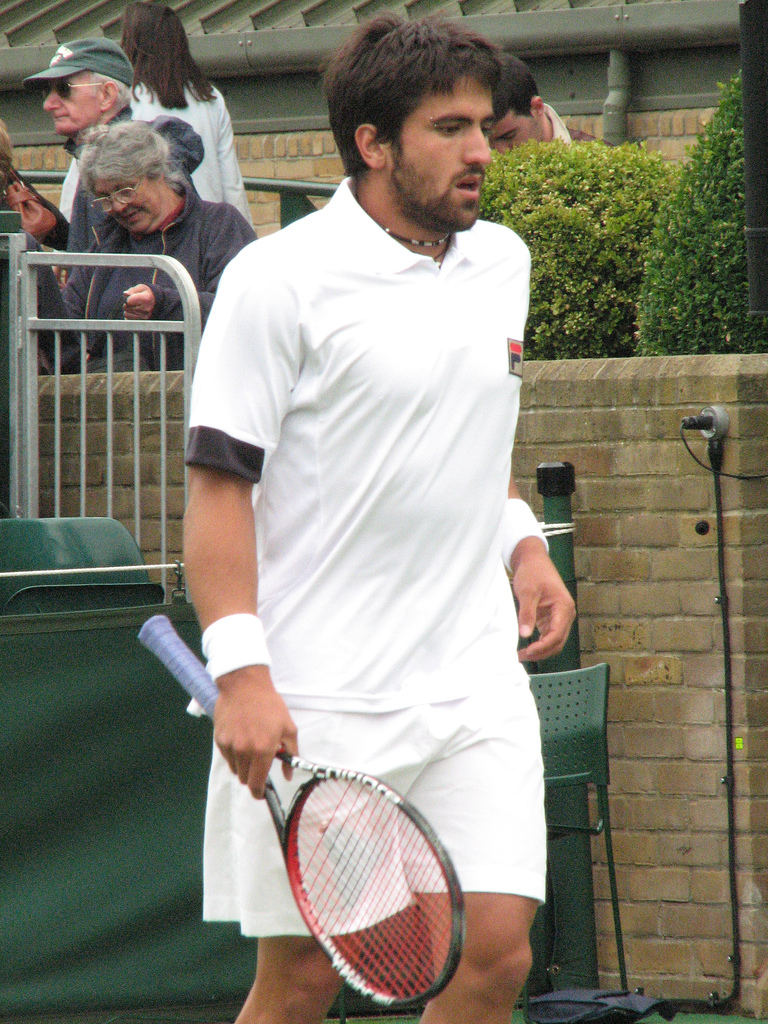
Janko Tipsarević, then representing Serbia and Montenegro took the singles title in 2004

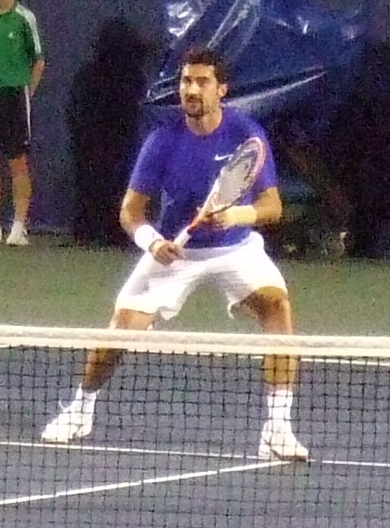
Eventual World No. 1 in doubles Nenad Zimonjić, competing for the Federal Republic of Yugoslavia, won the singles event in 2000

The BH Tennis Open International Cup was a professional tennis tournament played on outdoor hardcourts. It was part of the ATP Challenger Tour. It was held annually in Belo Horizonte, Brazil, from 1992 until 2011.

== Past finals ==
=== Singles ===
Year	Champion	Runner-up	Score
2011	(Brazil) Júlio Silva	(Portugal) Gastão Elias	6–4, 6–4
2010	(Brazil) Rogério Dutra da Silva	(Argentina) Facundo Argüello	6–4, 6–3
2009	(Brazil) Júlio Silva	(Argentina) Eduardo Schwank	4–6, 6–3, 6–4
2008	(Mexico) Santiago González	(Chile) Nicolás Massú	6–4, 6–3
2007	(Argentina) Brian Dabul	(Argentina) Eduardo Schwank	6–7(4), 7–6(5), 6–3
2006	(Brazil) Thiago Alves	(Brazil) André Sá	6–3, 0–6, 6–4
2005	(United States) John Paul Fruttero	(Denmark) Kristian Pless	7–6(4), 7–6(6)
2004	(Serbia and Montenegro) Janko Tipsarević	(Brazil) Ricardo Mello	6–4, 5–7, 6–4
2003	(Chile) Julio Peralta	(Thailand) Danai Udomchoke	7–6(6), 1–6, 6–1
2002	(Brazil) Ricardo Mello	(Brazil) Alexandre Simoni	6–3, 6–3
2001	(United States) Eric Taino	(Brazil) Flávio Saretta	5–7, 6–1, 6–2
2000	(Federal Republic of Yugoslavia) Nenad Zimonjić	(France) Jean-François Bachelot	6–3, 6–7(6), 7–5
1999	(United Kingdom) Jamie Delgado	(Brazil) Daniel Melo	6–2, 7–6
1998	(Brazil) Francisco Costa	(Argentina) Gastón Gaudio	4–6, 6–2, 6–4
1997	(Brazil) Roberto Jabali	(Brazil) André Sá	2–6, 7–5, 6–3
1996	(Brazil) Jaime Oncins	(Venezuela) Maurice Ruah	6–4, 6–3
1995	(United States) Steve Campbell	(Portugal) João Cunha Silva	6–2, 6–3
1994	(Brazil) Fabio Silberberg	(Italy) Marco Meneschincheri	7–6, 6–3
1993	(United States) Martin Blackman	(South Africa) David Adams	6–7, 6–4, 7–6
1992	(Austria) Gilbert Schaller	(Portugal) João Cunha Silva	6–4, 6–7, 6–0

=== Doubles ===
Year	Champions	Runners-up	Score
2011	(Argentina) Guido Andreozzi (Argentina) Eduardo Schwank	(Brazil) Ricardo Hocevar (Sweden) Christian Lindell	6–2, 6–4
2010	(Brazil) Rodrigo Grilli (Brazil) Leonardo Kirche	(Sweden) Christian Lindell (Brazil) João Souza	6–3, 6–3
2009	(Brazil) Márcio Torres (South Africa) Izak van der Merwe	(Argentina) Juan-Pablo Amado (Argentina) Eduardo Schwank	w/o
2008	(Mexico) Santiago González (Pakistan) Aisam-ul-Haq Qureshi	(Brazil) Daniel Silva (Brazil) Caio Zampieri	6–3, 7–6
2007	(Mexico) Santiago González (Brazil) Bruno Soares	(Brazil) Márcio Torres (France) Nicolas Tourte	6–7^{(3–7)}, 6–4, [10–5]
2006	(Brazil) Marcelo Melo (Brazil) André Sá	(Netherlands Antilles) Jean-Julien Rojer (Brazil) Márcio Torres	6–1, 6–4
2005	(United States) Lesley Joseph (Serbia and Montenegro) Alex Vlaški	(Argentina) Juan Martín del Potro (Argentina) Máximo González	7–6^{(10–8)}, 6–4
2004	(Thailand) Sanchai Ratiwatana (Thailand) Sonchat Ratiwatana	(Brazil) Marcos Daniel (Peru) Iván Miranda	6–2, 7–5
2003	(Brazil) Marcos Daniel (Brazil) Alexandre Simoni	(Japan) Kentaro Masuda (Japan) Takahiro Terachi	6–4, 6–2
2002	(Brazil) Daniel Melo (Brazil) Marcelo Melo	(Russia) Denis Golovanov (United States) Michael Joyce	6–3, 6–4
2001	(Australia) Dejan Petrovic (Israel) Andy Ram	(United Kingdom) Barry Cowan (United States) Eric Taino	6–3, 6–4
2000	(Brazil) Daniel Melo (Brazil) Alexandre Simoni	(United Kingdom) Jamie Delgado (United Kingdom) Martin Lee	6–4, 6–4
1999	(Brazil) Daniel Melo (Brazil) Antonio Prieto	(United Kingdom) Jamie Delgado (United Kingdom) Martin Lee	6–2, 3–6, 7–5
1998	(Japan) Satoshi Iwabuchi (Japan) Thomas Shimada	(South Africa) Jeff Coetzee (South Africa) Damien Roberts	6–7, 7–5, 7–5
1997	(Romania) Gabriel Trifu (United States) Glenn Weiner	(Brazil) Nelson Aerts (Brazil) André Sá	1–6, 6–3, 6–4
1996	(Mexico) Leonardo Lavalle (Venezuela) Maurice Ruah	(Mexico) Luis Herrera (Romania) Gabriel Trifu	5–7, 6–4, 6–4
1995	(United States) David DiLucia (United States) Dan Kronauge	(Brazil) Egberto Caldas (Brazil) Cristiano Testa	6–7, 6–3, 6–3
1994	(Brazil) Nelson Aerts (Brazil) Danilo Marcelino	(Brazil) Otavio Della (Brazil) Marcelo Saliola	7–5, 6–3
1993	(Brazil) Ricardo Acioly (Venezuela) Nicolás Pereira	(Chile) Felipe Rivera (Brazil) Fernando Roese	7–6, 5–7, 6–3
1992	(Brazil) Nelson Aerts (Brazil) Alexandre Hocevar	(Portugal) João Cunha Silva (Brazil) César Kist	6–1, 6–7, 6–2
