= Eduardo Schwank =

Argentine tennis player

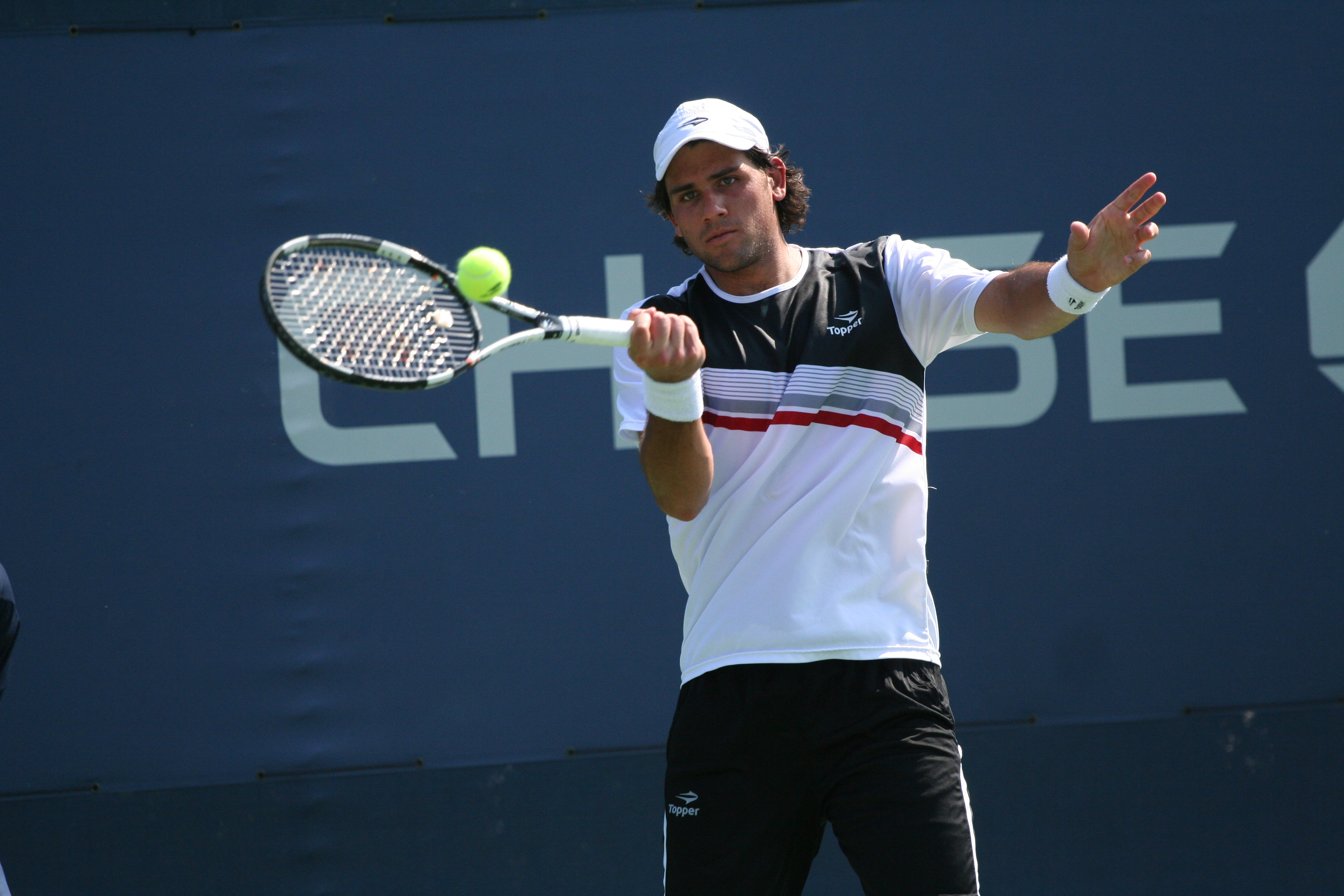
- Country (sports): Argentina
- Residence: Rosario, Argentina
- Born: 23 April 1986 (age 39) Rosario, Argentina
- Height: 1.83 m (6 ft 0 in)
- Turned pro: 2005
- Retired: 2015
- Plays: Right-handed (two-handed backhand)
- Prize money: $1,453,012

Singles
- Career record: 40–65
- Career titles: 0
- Highest ranking: No. 48 (7 June 2010)

Grand Slam singles results
- Australian Open: 2R (2011)
- French Open: 3R (2008, 2012)
- Wimbledon: 1R (2008, 2009, 2010)
- US Open: 2R (2010)

Doubles
- Career record: 45–39
- Career titles: 1
- Highest ranking: No. 14 (20 June 2011)

Grand Slam doubles results
- Australian Open: 2R (2012)
- French Open: F (2011)
- Wimbledon: SF (2010)
- US Open: SF (2010)

Other doubles tournaments
- Olympic Games: 1R (2012)

Grand Slam mixed doubles results
- Australian Open: 1R (2012)
- French Open: 2R (2012)
- Wimbledon: 2R (2011)
- US Open: F (2011)
Medal record
2007 Pan American Games
Gold medal – first place	2007 Rio de Janeiro	Doubles
Bronze medal – third place	2007 Rio de Janeiro	Singles
- Last updated on: 29 April 2021.

Eduardo Jonatan Schwank (Spanish pronunciation: [eˈðwaɾðo ˈʃwaŋk]; also known as Schwanka; born 23 April 1986) is a retired professional tennis player from Argentina. In 2011, he reached the finals of the French Open in men's doubles partnering Juan Sebastián Cabal and of the US Open in mixed doubles partnering Gisela Dulko. He was coached by Javier Nalbandian, the brother of David Nalbandian.

Schwank's family background is from the German-speaking part of Switzerland.

== Junior career ==
In his final year on the junior circuit in 2004, Schwank had a record of 39-4 winning five tournaments, with his biggest title the Banana Bowl defeating Pablo Andújar in the final. Schwank finished no. 2 in the rankings behind Gaël Monfils.

== Professional career ==
=== 2006 ===
In 2006, he won four consecutive Futures events: the former two in Argentina, the latter two in Bolivia.

=== 2007 ===
In 2007 he won a Challenger title in Medellín, defeating Chris Guccione in the final. He also won three consecutive Futures events. He won the bronze medal in singles and the gold medal in men's doubles at the 2007 Pan American Games in Rio de Janeiro.

=== 2008 ===
In April 2008, Schwank won two consecutive Challenger events, the first in Cremona, Italy and the second in Rome, Italy. On May 12, 2008, a hotel in which Schwank was staying while competing in a Challenger event in Bordeaux, France caught fire. Schwank's room was engulfed by the blaze, which destroyed his laptop, his passport, as well as the prize money he had earned from the Rome Challenger tournament. Schwank was not in his room at the time. He ended up winning the tournament, making that his third consecutive Challenger title.

He was involved in a legal battle after reportedly being accused of responsibility for the blaze by leaving an oven switched on in his room. He denied the charges.

At the 2008 French Open, Schwank defeated former world no. 1 Carlos Moyá in the first round. He was also victorious in his next match, but was defeated in the third round by Paul-Henri Mathieu in four sets.

=== 2011 ===
Schwank reached the final of the French Open in men's doubles partnering Juan Sebastián Cabal. In the final, they lost to Max Mirnyi and Daniel Nestor in three tight sets with a tiebreak in the first set. He also reached the final of the US Open in mixed doubles partnering Gisela Dulko. They lost to Jack Sock and Melanie Oudin in a super-tiebreak.

=== 2012 ===
In 2012, Schwank qualified for the French Open and advanced to the third round, where he lost to Rafael Nadal. He also teamed with Gisela Dulko in mixed doubles, and they beat Serena Williams and Bob Bryan in the first round. Schwank, partnering Juan Ignacio Chela, reached third round of Wimbledon 2012 doubles and lost to Daniele Bracciali and Julian Knowle. At the 2012 Summer Olympics, he partnered with David Nalbandian in the men's doubles, but they were knocked out in the first round.

== Grand Slam finals ==
=== Doubles: 1 (0–1) ===
Result	Year	Championship	Surface	Partner	Opponents	Score
Loss	2011	French Open	Clay	(Colombia) Juan Sebastián Cabal	(Belarus) Max Mirnyi (Canada) Daniel Nestor	6–7^{(3–7)}, 6–3, 4–6

=== Mixed doubles: 1 (0–1) ===
Result	Year	Championship	Surface	Partner	Opponents	Score
Loss	2011	US Open	Hard	(Argentina) Gisela Dulko	(United States) Melanie Oudin (United States) Jack Sock	6–7^{(4–7)}, 6–4, [8–10]

== ATP career finals ==
=== Doubles: 3 (1 title, 2 runners-up) ===
Legend Grand Slam (0–1) ATP Finals (0–0) ATP Tour Masters 1000 (0–0) ATP Tour 500 (0–0) ATP Tour 250 (1–1)	Titles by surface Hard (0–1) Clay (1–1) Grass (0–0)	Titles by setting Outdoor (1–1) Indoor (0–1)

Result	W–L	Date	Tournament	Tier	Surface	Partner	Opponents	Score
Win	1–0	Jul 2010	Stuttgart, Germany	ATP 250	Clay	(Argentina) Carlos Berlocq	(Germany) Christopher Kas (Germany) Philipp Petzschner	7–6^{(7–5)}, 7–6^{(8–6)}
Loss	1–1	Oct 2010	Montpellier, France	ATP 250	Hard	(Spain) Marc López	(Australia) Stephen Huss (United Kingdom) Ross Hutchins	2–6, 6–4, [8–10]
Loss	1–2	Jun 2011	French Open	Grand Slam	Clay	(Colombia) Juan Sebastián Cabal	(Belarus) Max Mirnyi (Canada) Daniel Nestor	6–7^{(3–7)}, 6–3, 4–6

== Team competition finals: 1 (1 runner-up) ==
Result	No.	Date	Tournament	Surface	Partner	Opponents	Score
Runner-up	1.	December 2–4, 2011	Davis Cup, Seville, Spain	Clay (i)	(Argentina) David Nalbandian (Argentina) Juan Martín del Potro (Argentina) Juan Mónaco	(Spain) Rafael Nadal (Spain) David Ferrer (Spain) Fernando Verdasco (Spain) Feliciano López	1–3

== ATP Challenger and ITF Futures finals ==
=== Singles: 27 (16–11) ===
Legend ATP Challenger (7–9) ITF Futures (9–2)	Finals by surface Hard (1–4) Clay (15–7) Grass (0–0) Carpet (0–0)

Result	W–L	Date	Tournament	Tier	Surface	Opponent	Score
Win	1–0	Apr 2006	Argentina F3, Buenos Aires	Futures	Clay	(Argentina) Cristian Villagrán	4–6, 6–3, 6–4
Win	2–0	Apr 2006	Argentina F4, Buenos Aires	Futures	Clay	(Argentina) Leandro Migani	6–3, 7–6^{(12–10)}
Loss	2–1	May 2006	Argentina F5, Buenos Aires	Futures	Clay	(Argentina) Cristian Villagrán	4–6, 1–6
Win	3–1	Aug 2006	Argentina F11, Córdoba	Futures	Clay	(Argentina) Leandro Migani	5–7, 6–0, 6–0
Win	4–1	Aug 2006	Argentina F12, Mendoza	Futures	Clay	(Argentina) Andrés Molteni	6–4, 6–1
Win	5–1	Sep 2006	Bolivia F1, La Paz	Futures	Clay	(Argentina) Guillermo Carry	6–3, 6–1
Win	6–1	Sep 2006	Bolivia F2, Cochabamba	Futures	Clay	(Argentina) Martín Alund	7–6^{(7–5)}, 6–7^{(4–7)}, 7–6^{(7–2)}
Win	7–1	Apr 2007	Argentina F1, Santa Fe	Futures	Clay	(Argentina) Juan-Martín Aranguren	6–3, 6–2
Win	8–1	May 2007	Argentina F2, Buenos Aires	Futures	Clay	(Argentina) Juan-Martín Aranguren	6–4, 6–4
Win	9–1	May 2007	Argentina F3, Tucumán	Futures	Clay	(Argentina) Juan Pablo Amado	6–1, 6–4
Loss	9–2	Jun 2007	Italy F16, Cesena	Futures	Clay	(Sweden) Filip Prpic	4–6, 2–6
Loss	9–3	Aug 2007	Belo Horizonte, Brazil	Challenger	Hard	(Argentina) Brian Dabul	7–6^{(7–4)}, 6–7^{(5–7)}, 3–6
Loss	9–4	Aug 2007	Manta, Ecuador	Challenger	Hard	(Japan) Go Soeda	4–6, 2–6
Win	10–4	Oct 2007	Medellín, Colombia	Challenger	Clay	(Australia) Chris Guccione	7–5, 5–7, 7–5
Loss	10–5	Mar 2008	Santiago, Chile	Challenger	Clay	(Brazil) Thomaz Bellucci	4–6, 6–7^{(3–7)}
Win	11–5	Apr 2008	Cremona, Italy	Challenger	Hard	(Germany) Björn Phau	6–3, 6–4
Win	12–5	May 2008	Rome, Italy	Challenger	Clay	(France) Éric Prodon	6–3, 6–7, 7–6
Win	13–5	May 2008	Bordeaux, France	Challenger	Clay	(Russia) Igor Kunitsyn	6–2, 6–2
Loss	13–6	Aug 2009	Belo Horizonte, Brazil	Challenger	Hard	(Brazil) Júlio Silva	6–3, 3–6, 4–6
Win	14–6	Oct 2009	Santiago, Chile	Challenger	Clay	(Chile) Nicolás Massú	6–2, 6–2
Win	15–6	Nov 2009	Lima, Peru	Challenger	Clay	(Chile) Jorge Aguilar	7–5, 6–4
Loss	15–7	Jan 2010	São Paulo, Brazil	Challenger	Hard	(Brazil) Ricardo Mello	3–6, 1–6
Win	16–7	Jan 2010	Bucaramanga, Colombia	Challenger	Clay	(Argentina) Juan Pablo Brzezicki	6–4, 6–2
Loss	16–8	May 2011	Rome, Italy	Challenger	Clay	(Italy) Simone Bolelli	6–2, 1–6, 3–6
Loss	16–9	Sep 2011	Cali, Colombia	Challenger	Clay	(Colombia) Alejandro Falla	4–6, 3–6
Loss	16–10	Oct 2011	San Jose do Rio Preto, Brazil	Challenger	Clay	(Brazil) Ricardo Mello	4–6, 2–6
Loss	16–11	Aug 2013	São Paulo, Brazil	Challenger	Clay	(Colombia) Alejandro González	2–6, 3–6

=== Doubles: 29 (21–8) ===
Legend ATP Challenger (14–6) ITF Futures (7–2)	Finals by surface Hard (3–1) Clay (18–7) Grass (0–0) Carpet (0–0)

Result	W–L	Date	Tournament	Tier	Surface	Partner	Opponents	Score
Win	1–0	May 2004	Argentina F2, Buenos Aires	Futures	Clay	(Argentina) Juan-Pablo Amado	(Argentina) Sebastián Decoud (Argentina) Juan-Martín Aranguren	6–1, 7–6^{(8–6)}
Win	2–0	Jan 2006	El Salvador F1, San Salvador	Futures	Clay	(Uruguay) Martín Vilarrubí	(Israel) Victor Kolik (United States) James Cerretani	6–2, 5–7, 6–0
Loss	2–1	Mar 2006	Argentina F2, Buenos Aires	Futures	Clay	(Argentina) Matias O'Neille	(Argentina) Brian Dabul (Argentina) Cristian Villagrán	6–2, 4–6, 2–6
Loss	2–2	Apr 2006	Argentina F3, Buenos Aires	Futures	Clay	(Argentina) Esteban Zanetti	(Argentina) Brian Dabul (Argentina) Cristian Villagrán	4–6, 2–6
Win	3–2	Apr 2006	Argentina F4, Buenos Aires	Futures	Clay	(Argentina) Sebastián Decoud	(Argentina) Horacio Zeballos (Argentina) Leandro Migani	6–2, 6–2
Win	4–2	Aug 2006	Argentina F12, Mendoza	Futures	Clay	(Argentina) Demian Gschwend	(Argentina) Andrés Molteni (Argentina) Nicolas Jara-Lozano	6–1, 6–2
Win	5–2	Sep 2006	Bolivia F1, La Paz	Futures	Clay	(Argentina) Demian Gschwend	(Chile) Borja Malo-Casado (United States) Nathan Thompson	6–1, 6–7^{(4–7)}, 6–0
Win	6–2	May 2007	Argentina F2, Buenos Aires	Futures	Clay	(Argentina) Demian Gschwend	(Argentina) Juan-Pablo Villar (Argentina) Alejandro Kon	6–1, 6–2
Win	7–2	Jun 2007	Italy F16, Cesena	Futures	Clay	(Argentina) Cristian Villagrán	(Italy) Francesco Piccari (Italy) Alessandro da Col	6–3, 6–2
Win	8–2	Aug 2007	Campos do Jordão, Brazil	Challenger	Hard	(Argentina) Horacio Zeballos	(United States) John Paul Fruttero (South Africa) Izak van der Merwe	3–6, 6–3, [12–10]
Win	9–2	Aug 2007	Manta, Ecuador	Challenger	Hard	(Argentina) Horacio Zeballos	(United States) John Paul Fruttero (United States) Eric Nunez	6–4, 6–2
Win	10–2	Nov 2007	Lima, Peru	Challenger	Clay	(Uruguay) Pablo Cuevas	(Uruguay) Martín Vilarrubí (Colombia) Michael Quintero	6–4, 6–2
Win	11–2	Jan 2008	La Serena, Chile	Challenger	Clay	(Ecuador) Nicolás Lapentti	(Argentina) Sebastián Decoud (Argentina) Cristian Villagrán	6–4, 6–0
Win	12–2	Mar 2008	Santiago, Chile	Challenger	Clay	(Argentina) Mariano Hood	(Argentina) Brian Dabul (Netherlands Antilles) Jean-Julien Rojer	6–3, 6–3
Win	13–2	Apr 2008	Cremona, Italy	Challenger	Hard	(Serbia) Dušan Vemić	(Romania) Florin Mergea (Romania) Horia Tecău	6–3, 6–2
Loss	13–3	Jul 2008	Lugano, Switzerland	Challenger	Clay	(Serbia) Dušan Vemić	(Australia) Rameez Junaid (Germany) Philipp Marx	6–7^{(7–9)}, 6–4, [7–10]
Loss	13–4	Aug 2009	Belo Horizonte, Brazil	Challenger	Hard	(Argentina) Juan-Pablo Amado	(Brazil) Márcio Torres (South Africa) Izak van der Merwe	walkover
Loss	13–5	Oct 2009	Asunción, Paraguay	Challenger	Clay	(Argentina) Máximo González	(Spain) Santiago Ventura (Spain) Rubén Ramírez Hidalgo	3–6, 6–7^{(5–7)}
Win	14–5	Oct 2009	Santiago, Chile	Challenger	Clay	(Argentina) Diego Cristin	(Spain) David Marrero (Argentina) Juan Pablo Brzezicki	6–4, 7–5
Win	15–5	Nov 2009	Medellín, Colombia	Challenger	Clay	(Argentina) Sebastián Decoud	(Spain) David Marrero (Argentina) Diego Junqueira	6–0, 6–2
Loss	15–6	Jun 2011	Košice, Slovakia	Challenger	Clay	(Argentina) Facundo Bagnis	(Germany) Simon Greul (Germany) Bastian Knittel	6–2, 3–6, [9–11]
Win	16–6	Sep 2011	Belo Horizonte, Brazil	Challenger	Clay	(Argentina) Guido Andreozzi	(Brazil) Ricardo Hocevar (Sweden) Christian Lindell	6–2, 6–4
Loss	16–7	Sep 2011	Cali, Colombia	Challenger	Clay	(Argentina) Facundo Bagnis	(Colombia) Robert Farah (Colombia) Juan Sebastián Cabal	5–7, 2–6
Win	17–7	Nov 2011	Buenos Aires, Argentina	Challenger	Clay	(Argentina) Carlos Berlocq	(Uruguay) Marcel Felder (Czech Republic) Jaroslav Pospíšil	6–7^{(1–7)}, 6–4, [10–7]
Win	18–7	Aug 2013	São Paulo, Brazil	Challenger	Clay	(Brazil) Fernando Romboli	(El Salvador) Marcelo Arévalo (Colombia) Nicolás Barrientos	6–7^{(6–8)}, 6–4, [10–8]
Win	19–7	Sep 2013	Cali, Colombia	Challenger	Clay	(Argentina) Guido Andreozzi	(Brazil) João Souza (Colombia) Carlos Salamanca	6–2, 6–4
Loss	19–8	Mar 2014	Salinas, Ecuador	Challenger	Clay	(Bolivia) Hugo Dellien	(Brazil) Fernando Romboli (Venezuela) Roberto Maytín	3–6, 4–6
Win	20–8	Apr 2014	Itajaí, Brazil	Challenger	Clay	(Argentina) Máximo González	(Brazil) João Souza (Brazil) André Sá	6–2, 6–3
Win	21–8	May 2014	Cali, Colombia	Challenger	Clay	(Argentina) Facundo Bagnis	(Colombia) Nicolás Barrientos (Colombia) Eduardo Struvay	6–3, 6–3

== Performance timelines ==
Key
W	F	SF	QF	#R	RR	Q#	P#	DNQ	A	Z#	PO	G	S	B	NMS	NTI	P	NH

(W) winner; (F) finalist; (SF) semifinalist; (QF) quarterfinalist; (#R) rounds 4, 3, 2, 1; (RR) round-robin stage; (Q#) qualification round; (DNQ) did not qualify; (A) absent; (NH) not held; (SR) strike rate (events won / competed); (W–L) win–loss record.

=== Singles ===
Tournament	2007	2008	2009	2010	2011	2012	2013	SR	W–L	Win %
Grand Slam tournaments
Australian Open	A	A	1R	A	2R	Q2	A	0 / 2	1–2	33%
French Open	A	3R	1R	1R	Q2	3R	Q1	0 / 4	4–4	50%
Wimbledon	Q1	1R	1R	1R	A	A	A	0 / 3	0–3	0%
US Open	Q3	1R	A	2R	Q1	A	Q1	0 / 2	1–2	33%
Win–loss	0–0	2–3	0–3	1–3	1–1	2–1	0–0	0 / 11	6–11	35%
ATP World Tour Masters 1000
Indian Wells Masters	A	A	1R	A	A	A	A	0 / 1	0–1	0%
Miami Open	A	A	1R	2R	A	A	A	0 / 2	1–2	33%
Monte-Carlo Masters	A	A	1R	1R	A	A	A	0 / 2	0–2	0%
Madrid Open	A	Q2	1R	2R	A	Q1	A	0 / 2	1–2	33%
Canadian Open	A	A	A	1R	A	A	A	0 / 1	0–1	0%
Shanghai Masters	NMS		A	1R	A	A	A	0 / 1	0–1	0%
Win–loss	0–0	0–0	0–4	2–5	0–0	0–0	0–0	0 / 9	2–9	18%

=== Doubles ===
Tournament	2008	2009	2010	2011	2012	2013	2014	SR	W–L	Win %
Australian Open	A	1R	A	1R	2R	A	A	0 / 3	1–3	25%
French Open	A	1R	1R	F	2R	A	A	0 / 4	6–4	60%
Wimbledon	2R	A	SF	3R	3R	2R	A	0 / 5	10–5	67%
US Open	2R	A	SF	2R	A	1R	A	0 / 4	6–4	60%
Win–loss	2–2	0–2	8–3	8–4	4–3	1–2	0–0	0 / 16	23–16	58%
National representation
Olympics	A	Not Held			1R	Not Held		0 / 1	0–1	0%
ATP World Tour Masters 1000
Monte-Carlo Masters	A	A	A	A	2R	A	A	0 / 1	1–1	50%
Madrid Open	A	A	2R	A	2R	A	A	0 / 2	2–2	50%
Italian Open	A	A	A	A	2R	A	A	0 / 1	1–1	50%
Win–loss	0–0	0–0	1–1	0–0	3–3	0–0	0–0	0 / 4	4–4	50%
