= Marcel Felder =

Uruguayan tennis player

- Country (sports): Uruguay
- Residence: Montevideo, Uruguay
- Born: 9 July 1984 (age 42) Montevideo, Uruguay
- Height: 1.74 m (5 ft 8 1/2 in)
- Turned pro: 2001
- Plays: Right-handed (two-handed backhand)
- Prize money: $235,292

Singles
- Career record: 20–14
- Career titles: 0; 0 Challenger, 17 Futuers
- Highest ranking: No. 227 (28 December 2009)

Grand Slam singles results
- Wimbledon: Q3 (2012)
- US Open: Q1 (2009)

Doubles
- Career record: 14–16
- Career titles: 0; 9 Challenger, 22 Futuers
- Highest ranking: No. 82 (11 June 2012)

Grand Slam doubles results
- Wimbledon: 1R (2012)
- Last updated on: 14 April 2022.

Marcel Felder
Medal record

Representing Uruguay

Maccabiah Games

Tennis
| Gold medal – first place | 2013 Israel | Men's individual |

Marcel Felder (Latin American Spanish: [maɾˈsel felˈdeɾ]; German: [maʁˈsɛl ˈfɛldɐ]; born 9 July 1984) is a Uruguayan professional tennis player. His highest ranking in singles was No. 227 on 28 December 2009. His highest ranking in doubles was 82 on 11 June 2012. Felder won a gold medal at the 2013 Maccabiah Games.

== Tennis career ==
The right-hander achieved career high rankings of World No. 227 in singles in 2009, and No. 82 in doubles in 2012. In Davis Cup play, through September 2013 he was 21–14 in singles and 12–10 in doubles. As of September 2013, he held the Uruguay record for most Davis Cup wins in doubles.

His father is Geraldo, and his mother is Judith. He has a brother named Andres, and a sister, Celine. Felder began playing tennis at four years of age.

As a junior, his career-high rankings were # 4 in singles, and # 5 in doubles, both in 2002.

In February 2007 he played for the Uruguay Davis Cup team against Jamaica.

After testing positive for cannabis in 2007, Felder was banned for two months.

Felder won a gold medal in singles in men's tennis at the 2013 Maccabiah Games in Israel.

== ATP Challenger and ITF Futures finals ==
=== Singles: 27 (17–10) ===
| Legend ATP Challenger (0–1) ITF Futures (17–9) | Finals by surface Hard (10–6) Clay (7–4) Grass (0–0) Carpet (0–0) |

| Result | W–L | Date | Tournament | Tier | Surface | Opponent | Score |
|---|---|---|---|---|---|---|---|
| Loss | 0-1 | Mar 2003 | India F5, Calcutta | Futures | Hard | (Austria) Zbynek Mlynarik | 3–6, 4–6 |
| Loss | 0-2 | Jun 2003 | Portugal F10, Lisbon | Futures | Clay | (France) Gilles Simon | 1–6, 4–6 |
| Win | 1-2 | Feb 2005 | Mexico F2, Casablanca Satellite | Futures | Hard | (Germany) Tobias Clemens | 6–2, 6–2 |
| Loss | 1-3 | Aug 2005 | Ecuador F1, Guayaquil | Futures | Hard | (United States) Jesse Witten | 4–6, 4–6 |
| Win | 2-3 | Feb 2006 | Colombia F2, Bucaramanga | Futures | Clay | (Spain) Daniel Muñoz de la Nava | 6–3, 6–4 |
| Win | 3-3 | Mar 2006 | Mexico F3, Chetumal | Futures | Hard | (Italy) Adriano Biasella | 6–3, 6–3 |
| Loss | 3-4 | May 2007 | Colombia F4, Pereira | Futures | Clay | (Colombia) Juan Sebastián Cabal | 6–7^{(7–9)}, 3–6 |
| Loss | 3-5 | Jan 2008 | Guatemala F1, Guatemala City | Futures | Hard | (Canada) Peter Polansky | 6–7^{(5–7)}, 3–6 |
| Win | 4-5 | Jan 2008 | Costa Rica F1, San Jose | Futures | Hard | (Ecuador) Carlos Avellán | 6–3, 6–2 |
| Loss | 4-6 | Apr 2008 | Brazil F1, Ribeirão Preto | Futures | Clay | (Brazil) Ricardo Hocevar | 2–6, 2–6 |
| Win | 5-6 | May 2008 | Brazil F4, Caldas Novas | Futures | Hard | (Brazil) André Miele | 6–1, 6–4 |
| Win | 6-6 | May 2008 | Brazil F5, Uberlândia | Futures | Clay | (Brazil) Eric Gomes | 6–2, 6–3 |
| Loss | 6-7 | Jun 2008 | Brazil F6, Brasília | Futures | Clay | (Brazil) André Miele | 2–6, 3–6 |
| Win | 7-7 | Aug 2008 | Argentina F8, Oberá | Futures | Clay | (Argentina) Alejandro Fabbri | 6–1, 3–6, 6–4 |
| Win | 8-7 | Sep 2008 | Mexico F9, Metepec | Futures | Hard | (Mexico) Miguel Gallardo Valles | 6–4, 5–7, 6–4 |
| Loss | 8-8 | Apr 2009 | Mexico City, Mexico | Challenger | Hard | (Belgium) Dick Norman | 4–6, 7–6^{(8–6)}, 5–7 |
| Win | 9-8 | Aug 2009 | Colombia F4, Bogotá | Futures | Clay | (Colombia) Alejandro González | 6–4, 4–6, 6–3 |
| Win | 10-8 | Apr 2010 | Brazil F1, Santa Maria | Futures | Clay | (Brazil) Rafael Camilo | 7–6^{(7–4)}, 6–4 |
| Win | 11-8 | May 2010 | Brazil F4, Fortaleza | Futures | Clay | (Brazil) Eladio Ribeiro Neto | 4–6, 6–3, 6–4 |
| Win | 12-8 | Feb 2011 | El Salvador F1, Santa Tecla | Futures | Clay | (Argentina) Agustín Velotti | 6–4, 7–6^{(9–7)} |
| Win | 13-8 | May 2011 | Mexico F4, Guadalajara | Futures | Hard | (Guatemala) Christopher Díaz Figueroa | 6–3, 6–2 |
| Loss | 13-9 | Jun 2011 | Mexico F6, Puebla | Futures | Hard | (Moldova) Roman Borvanov | 6–4, 5–7, 4–6 |
| Win | 14-9 | Jun 2011 | Mexico F7, Morelia | Futures | Hard | (New Zealand) Artem Sitak | 2–6, 6–4, 6–4 |
| Win | 15-9 | Aug 2011 | Ecuador F5, Guayaquil | Futures | Hard | (Ecuador) Iván Endara | 4–6, 7–5, 6–1 |
| Win | 16-9 | Aug 2011 | Mexico F8, Leon | Futures | Hard | (United States) Adam El Mihdawy | 6–2, 6–3 |
| Loss | 16-10 | Feb 2012 | Mexico F2, Mexico City | Futures | Hard | (Dominican Republic) Víctor Estrella Burgos | 6–7^{(2–7)}, 6–2, 2–6 |
| Win | 17-10 | May 2017 | Mexico F4, Pachuca | Futures | Hard | (Mexico) Manuel Sánchez | 3–6, 6–4, 6–4 |

=== Doubles: 51 (31–20) ===
| Legend ATP Challenger (9–8) ITF Futures (22–12) | Finals by surface Hard (11–2) Clay (20–18) Grass (0–0) Carpet (0–0) |

| Result | W–L | Date | Tournament | Tier | Surface | Partner | Opponents | Score |
|---|---|---|---|---|---|---|---|---|
| Loss | 0–1 | Nov 2002 | Uruguay F2, Montevideo | Futures | Clay | (Uruguay) Martín Vilarrubí | (Argentina) Brian Dabul (Argentina) Leonardo Olguín | 0–6, 2–6 |
| Loss | 0–2 | Apr 2003 | Chile F2, Viña del Mar | Futures | Clay | (Argentina) Matias O'Neille | (Chile) Juan Ignacio Cerda (Chile) Phillip Harboe | 2–6, 7–6^{(7–4)}, 4–6 |
| Win | 1–2 | Feb 2005 | Cuba F1, Havana | Futures | Hard | (Uruguay) Martín Vilarrubí | (Cuba) Ricardo Chile-Fonte (Cuba) Sandor Martínez-Breijo | 6–2, 6–3 |
| Win | 2–2 | Aug 2005 | Manta, Ecuador | Challenger | Hard | (Argentina) Brian Dabul | (Brazil) Franco Ferreiro (Brazil) Marcelo Melo | 6–3, 4–6, 6–4 |
| Win | 3–2 | Aug 2005 | Ecuador F1, Guayaquil | Futures | Hard | (Argentina) Brian Dabul | (United States) Nicholas Monroe (United States) Sam Warburg | 7–5, 5–7, 6–2 |
| Win | 4–2 | Nov 2005 | Venezuela F7, Maracay | Futures | Hard | (Argentina) Brian Dabul | (Uruguay) Pablo Cuevas (Argentina) Horacio Zeballos | 7–5, 6–4 |
| Win | 5–2 | Nov 2005 | Venezuela F8, Maracay | Futures | Hard | (Argentina) Brian Dabul | (Venezuela) Piero Luisi (Venezuela) David Navarrete | 7–5, 6–4 |
| Win | 6–2 | Feb 2006 | Colombia F2, Bucaramanga | Futures | Clay | (Argentina) Brian Dabul | (Uruguay) Pablo Cuevas (Uruguay) Martín Vilarrubí | 6–3, 6–2 |
| Win | 7–2 | Mar 2006 | Cuba F1, Havana | Futures | Hard | (Uruguay) Martín Vilarrubí | (Cuba) Ricardo Chile-Fonte (Cuba) Sandor Martínez-Breijo | 6–3, 6–4 |
| Win | 8–2 | Apr 2006 | Uruguay F2, Montevideo | Futures | Clay | (Argentina) Brian Dabul | (Uruguay) Martín Vilarrubí (Argentina) Diego Cristin | 6–3, 6–0 |
| Loss | 8–3 | May 2006 | Argentina F8, Mendoza | Futures | Clay | (Argentina) Brian Dabul | (Chile) Jorge Aguilar (Mexico) Daniel Garza | 7–5, 4–6, 3–6 |
| Loss | 8–4 | Jun 2006 | Argentina F9, Buenos Aires | Futures | Clay | (Argentina) Diego Cristin | (Argentina) Brian Dabul (Argentina) Cristian Villagrán | 7–6^{(7–2)}, 3–6, 5–7 |
| Loss | 8–5 | Nov 2066 | Guayaquil, Ecuador | Challenger | Clay | (Spain) Fernando Vicente | (Argentina) Juan Pablo Brzezicki (Argentina) Leonardo Mayer | 6–1, 5–7, [12–14] |
| Win | 9–5 | Dec 2006 | Uruguay F4, Punta del Este | Futures | Clay | (Argentina) Brian Dabul | (Argentina) Guillermo Carry (Argentina) Antonio Pastorino | 3–6, 6–2, 6–2 |
| Win | 10–5 | May 2007 | Colombia F3, Cali | Futures | Clay | (Colombia) Pablo González | (Ecuador) Carlos Avellán (Mexico) Daniel Garza | 6–4, 6–0 |
| Win | 11–5 | May 2007 | Colombia F4, Pereira | Futures | Clay | (Colombia) Pablo González | (Colombia) Michael Quintero Aguilar (Mexico) Daniel Garza | 6–3, 6–4 |
| Win | 12–5 | Jun 2007 | Italy F17, Teramo | Futures | Clay | (Spain) Miquel Perez Puigdomenech | (Italy) Enrico Burzi (Bosnia and Herzegovina) Ismar Gorčić | 2–6, 6–3, 6–2 |
| Loss | 12–6 | Jun 2007 | France F9, Toulon | Futures | Clay | (Italy) Adriano Biasella | (France) Augustin Gensse (Spain) David Marrero | 6–2, 3–6, 6–7^{(5–7)} |
| Win | 13–6 | Dec 2007 | Uruguay F1, Montevideo | Futures | Clay | (Spain) Miquel Perez Puigdomenech | (Argentina) Pablo Galdón (Argentina) Alejandro Kon | 6–3, 6–3 |
| Win | 14–6 | Dec 2007 | Uruguay F2, Punta del Este | Futures | Clay | (Spain) Miquel Perez Puigdomenech | (Argentina) Alejandro Fabbri (Argentina) Guillermo Bujniewicz | 5–7, 6–3, [10–8] |
| Win | 15–6 | Aug 2008 | Campos do Jordão, Brazil | Challenger | Hard | (Argentina) Brian Dabul | (Brazil) Márcio Torres (South Africa) Izak van der Merwe | 6–4, 7–6^{(11–9)} |
| Loss | 15–7 | Jul 2010 | Netherlands F4, Breda | Futures | Clay | (Ukraine) Oleksandr Agafonov | (Netherlands) Matwé Middelkoop (Netherlands) Thomas Schoorel | 6–4, 3–6, [6–10] |
| Loss | 15–8 | Jul 2010 | Estonia F2, Tallinn | Futures | Clay | (Ukraine) Oleksandr Agafonov | (Finland) Harri Heliövaara (Finland) Juho Paukku | 3–6, 2–6 |
| Win | 16–8 | Aug 2010 | Brazil F21, Campo Grande | Futures | Clay | (Brazil) Rafael Camilo | (Brazil) André Ghem (Brazil) Rodrigo Guidolin | 6–4, 5–7, [14–12] |
| Win | 17–8 | Sep 2010 | Brazil F23, Fortaleza | Futures | Clay | (Brazil) Fernando Romboli | (Brazil) Diego Matos (Brazil) André Miele | 7–6^{(7–4)}, 4–6, [10–4] |
| Win | 18–8 | Feb 2011 | Panama F1, Panama City | Futures | Clay | (Uruguay) Martín Cuevas | (Bulgaria) Boris Nicola Bakalov (Germany) Alexander Satschko | 7–5, 6–3 |
| Win | 19–8 | Apr 2011 | Pereira, Colombia | Challenger | Clay | (Colombia) Carlos Salamanca | (Colombia) Alejandro Falla (Colombia) Eduardo Struvay | 7–6^{(7–5)}, 6–4 |
| Win | 20–8 | Jun 2011 | Mexico F5, Celaya | Futures | Hard | (Guatemala) Christopher Díaz Figueroa | (Mexico) Luis Díaz Barriga (Mexico) Miguel Ángel Reyes-Varela | 3–6, 6–3, [10—5] |
| Loss | 20–9 | Jul 2011 | Manta, Ecuador | Challenger | Hard | (Mexico) Daniel Garza | (Argentina) Brian Dabul (South Africa) Izak van der Merwe | 1–6, 7–6^{(7–2)}, [9–11] |
| Win | 21–9 | Aug 2011 | Mexico F9, Tijuana | Futures | Hard | (Mexico) Daniel Garza | (El Salvador) Marcelo Arévalo (Australia) Robert McKenzie | 7–5, 7–6^{(7–4)} |
| Win | 22–9 | Sep 2011 | Campinas, Brazil | Challenger | Clay | (Brazil) Caio Zampieri | (Brazil) Fabrício Neis (Brazil) João Pedro Sorgi | 7–5, 6–4 |
| Win | 23–9 | Oct 2011 | Recife, Brazil | Challenger | Hard | (Argentina) Guido Andreozzi | (Brazil) Rodrigo-Antonio Grilli (Brazil) André Miele | 6–3, 6–3 |
| Loss | 23–10 | Nov 2011 | Buenos Aires, Argentina | Challenger | Clay | (Czech Republic) Jaroslav Pospíšil | (Argentina) Carlos Berlocq (Argentina) Eduardo Schwank | 7–6^{(7–1)}, 4–6, [7–10] |
| Loss | 23–11 | Nov 2011 | Montevideo, Uruguay | Challenger | Clay | (Argentina) Diego Schwartzman | (Serbia) Nikola Ćirić (Montenegro) Goran Tošić | 6–7^{(5–7)}, 6–7^{(4–7)} |
| Loss | 23–12 | Nov 2011 | Guayaquil, Ecuador | Challenger | Clay | (Brazil) Rodrigo-Antonio Grilli | (Ecuador) Julio César Campozano (Ecuador) Roberto Quiroz | 4–6, 1–6 |
| Win | 24–12 | Mar 2012 | Santiago, Chile | Challenger | Clay | (Chile) Paul Capdeville | (Chile) Jorge Aguilar (Mexico) Daniel Garza | 6–7^{(3–7)}, 6–4, [10–7] |
| Loss | 24–13 | Apr 2012 | Barranquilla, Colombia | Challenger | Clay | (Germany) Frank Moser | (United States) Nicholas Monroe (United States) Maciek Sykut | 6–2, 3–6, [5–10] |
| Win | 25–13 | Apr 2012 | São Paulo, Brazil | Challenger | Clay | (Chile) Paul Capdeville | (Brazil) André Ghem (Brazil) João Pedro Sorgi | 7–5, 6–3 |
| Win | 26–13 | May 2012 | Rio Quente, Brazil | Challenger | Hard | (Argentina) Guido Andreozzi | (Brazil) Thiago Alves (Brazil) Augusto Laranja | 6–3, 6–3 |
| Win | 27–13 | Jun 2012 | Caltanissetta, Italy | Challenger | Clay | (Croatia) Antonio Veić | (Spain) Daniel Gimeno Traver (Spain) Iván Navarro | 5–7, 7–6^{(7–5)}, [10–6] |
| Loss | 27–14 | Sep 2012 | Campinas, Brazil | Challenger | Clay | (Argentina) Máximo González | (Brazil) Marcelo Demoliner (Brazil) João Souza | 1–6, 5–7 |
| Loss | 27–15 | May 2016 | Tunisia F17, Hammamet | Futures | Clay | (Uruguay) Nicolás Xiviller | (Tunisia) Anis Ghorbel (Spain) Oriol Roca Batalla | 1–6, 2–6 |
| Win | 28–15 | May 2016 | Tunisia F19, Hammamet | Futures | Clay | (Chile) Cristóbal Saavedra Corvalán | (Spain) Carlos Taberner (Japan) Kento Yamada | 6–3, 6–0 |
| Win | 29–15 | May 2016 | Tunisia F20, Hammamet | Futures | Clay | (Chile) Cristóbal Saavedra Corvalán | (Italy) Antonio Campo (Italy) Pietro Rondoni | 6–4, 6–2 |
| Win | 30–15 | Jun 2016 | Italy F16, Basilicanova | Futures | Clay | (Argentina) Patricio Heras | (Brazil) Eduardo Dischinger (Portugal) João Domingues | 6–4, 6–3 |
| Loss | 30–16 | Jul 2016 | Germany F6, Saarlouis | Futures | Clay | (Argentina) Manuel Pena Lopez | (Germany) Sebastian Fanselow (Germany) Julian Lenz | 6–7^{(4–7)}, 3–6 |
| Win | 31–16 | Jul 2016 | Italy F22, Pontedera | Futures | Clay | (Italy) Antonio Massara | (Italy) Alessandro Colella (Italy) Giacomo Miccini | 6–4, 6–1 |
| Loss | 31–17 | Aug 2016 | Italy F25, Padua | Futures | Clay | (Italy) Francisco Bahamonde | (France) Jonathan Eysseric (Italy) Matteo Viola | 6–4, 1–6, [8–10] |
| Loss | 31–18 | Dec 2016 | Uruguay F1, Punta del Este | Futures | Clay | (Uruguay) Santiago Maresca | (Argentina) Juan Pablo Ficovich (Argentina) Camilo Ugo Carabelli | 4–6, 6–4, 6–7 ret/ |
| Loss | 31–19 | Dec 2016 | Uruguay F3, Salto | Futures | Clay | (Argentina) Gabriel Alejandro Hidalgo | (Brazil) Orlando Luz (Brazil) Marcelo Zormann | 6–7^{(2–7)}, 4–6 |
| Loss | 31–20 | Jul 2017 | Granby, Canada | Challenger | Hard | (Japan) Go Soeda | (United Kingdom) Joe Salisbury (United States) Jackson Withrow | 6–4, 3–6, [6–10] |

== See also ==
- List of notable Jewish tennis players
