= Gregg Hill =

American tennis player

- Country (sports): United States
- Born: September 26, 1977 (age 48)
- Height: 6 ft 1 in (185 cm)

Singles
- Highest ranking: No. 776 (June 24, 1996)

Doubles
- Career record: 0–2
- Highest ranking: No. 709 (Nov 17, 1997)

Gregg Hill (born September 26, 1977) is an American former professional tennis player.

A native of North Carolina, Hill was trained in Florida and made the junior doubles semi-finals at Wimbledon. He played collegiate tennis for the University of Southern California.

Hill began competing on tour in the 1990s and made two doubles main draw appearances on the ATP Tour partnered with longtime friend Tommy Haas, including Delray Beach in 2009.
