= Christian Lindell =

Brazilian tennis player

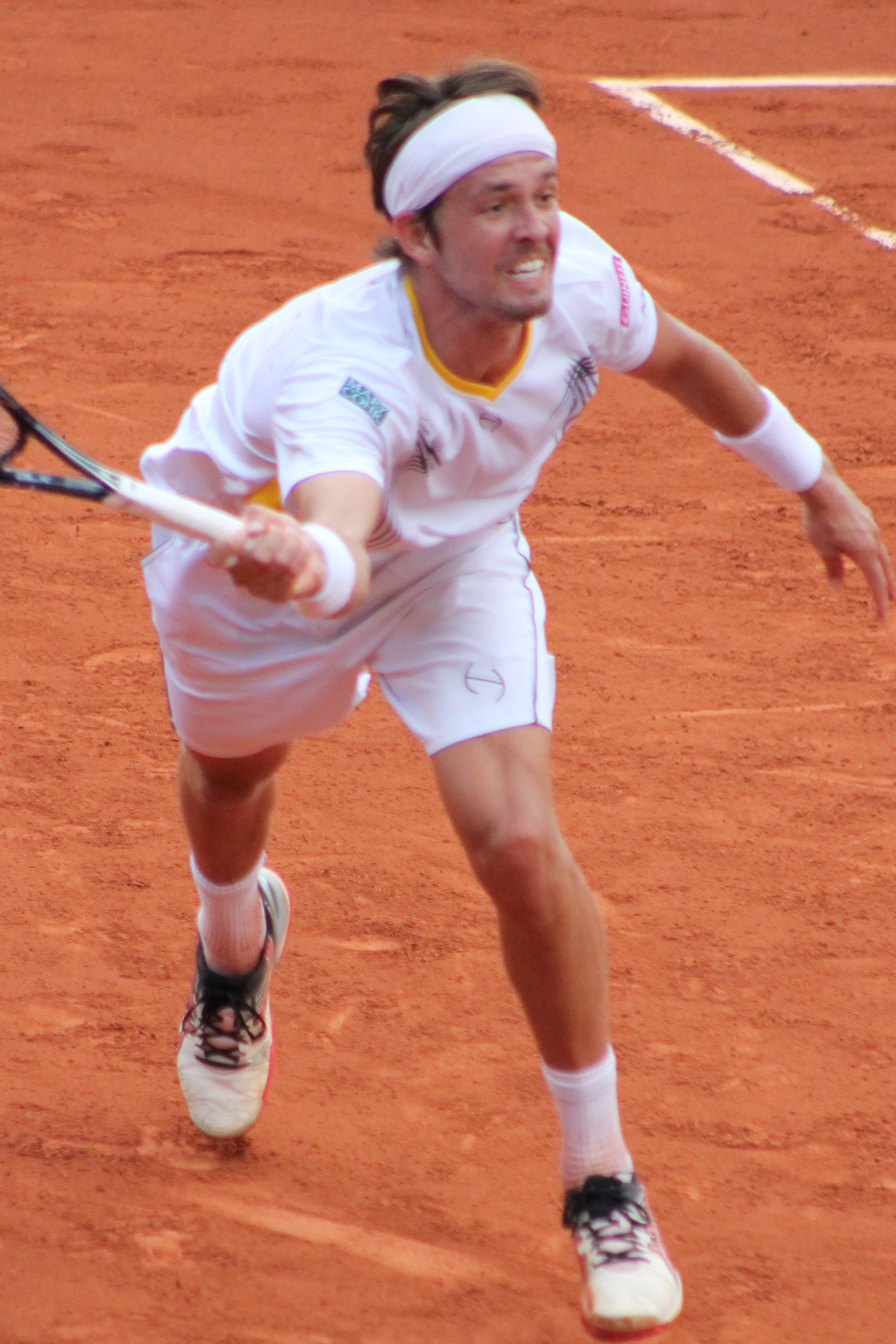
- Country (sports): Sweden (2007 to January 2012; June 2012 – present); Brazil (February 2012 – June 2012)
- Residence: Rio de Janeiro, Brazil
- Born: 20 November 1991 (age 33) Rio de Janeiro, Brazil
- Height: 1.93 m (6 ft 4 in)
- Turned pro: 2008
- Plays: Right-handed (double-handed backhand)
- Prize money: $306,766

Singles
- Career record: 7–14
- Career titles: 0
- Highest ranking: No. 177 (20 July 2015)

Grand Slam singles results
- French Open: 1R (2015)
- Wimbledon: Q1 (2015)
- US Open: Q1 (2015)

Doubles
- Career record: 0–1
- Career titles: 0
- Highest ranking: No. 293 (7 March 2016)

Team competitions
- Davis Cup: 4–3
- Last updated on: 31 October 2022.

Christian Meira Lindell (born 20 November 1991) is an inactive professional tennis player from Brazil who plays for Sweden. He has played seven Davis Cup matches, with a 4–3 record.

== Personal information ==
He has a Swedish father and a Brazilian mother.

Although he has lived his entire life in Brazil, Lindell represents Sweden through a curious chain of events. Despite having been one of the best Brazilian juniors in his age group, he was not picked to play for Brazil in the South American Junior Championships in 2007. A few months later, while on holiday in Sweden, he decided to play in the Swedish Junior Championships. Lindell won the title and received an invitation to train with the Swedish Tennis Federation and to represent Sweden, which he accepted.

On 15 May 2011 Lindell was invited to join Sweden's number one singles player Robin Söderling and the doubles pairing of Simon Aspelin and Robert Lindstedt for the 2011 Power Horse World Team Cup. He faced the top-tier players John Isner, Mikhail Kukushkin and Juan Ignacio Chela, but lost his three matches.

On 6 February 2012, Lindell announced via Twitter that he would be representing Brazil from then on. Then, in June, it emerged that Lindell had again swapped allegiances. The Swedish tennis site tennissverige.se reported that because the Brazilian Tennis Confederation wouldn't fund him to train with his long-term Swedish coach Julius Demburg, Lindell had decided to return to the Swedish Federation, allegedly for good this time.

=== 2008 ===
Lindell made his professional debut on the ITF Futures circuit. In his second tournament, he earned his first ranking points as he reached the quarter-finals before losing to Juan-Pablo Villar.

=== 2010 ===
Lindell made his ATP Tour debut, receiving a wild card into the main draw in Bastad. With a ranking of 856, he performed admirably, winning the first set against #63 Jarkko Nieminen in a 6–4 0–6 4–6 defeat.

Later in the year, Lindell, having improved his ranking to 445, reached his first ATP Challenger semi-final, losing to #27 Thomaz Bellucci.

=== 2014 ===
Won his first ever ATP Tour match in Bastad, defeating Inigo Cervantes before losing to Pablo Cuevas in the 2nd round.

=== 2015 ===
Reached his first ATP Challenger final in São Paulo, losing to Guido Pella.

Lindell qualified for his first Grand Slam at Roland Garros, defeating Aslan Karatsev, James Ward and Jan Hernych. He lost in the 1st round to home favourite Jo-Wilfried Tsonga.

== Challenger and Futures/World Tennis Tour Finals ==
=== Singles: 31 (13–18) ===
Legend (singles)
ATP Challenger Tour (0–1)
ITF Futures/World Tennis Tour (13–17)

Titles by surface
Hard (0–0)
Clay (13–18)
Grass (0–0)
Carpet (0–0)

Result	W–L	Date	Tournament	Tier	Surface	Opponent	Score
Loss	0–1	Aug 2010	Brazil F17, Uberlândia	Futures	Clay	(Brazil) Rafael Camilo	4–6, 2–6
Loss	0–2	Aug 2010	Brazil F19, São José dos Campos	Futures	Clay	(Brazil) André Miele	4–6, 6–1, 4–6
Loss	0–3	Oct 2010	Brazil F26, Itu	Futures	Clay	(Brazil) Fernando Romboli	4–6, 5–7
Win	1–3	Oct 2010	Brazil F28, Fernandópolis	Futures	Clay	(Brazil) André Miele	7–6^{(8–6)}, 6–2
Loss	1–4	Jan 2011	Brazil F3, Aracaju	Futures	Clay	(Germany) Andre Begemann	4–6, 2–6
Loss	1–5	Jun 2011	Italy F12, Bergamo	Futures	Clay	(Italy) Stefano Travaglia	2–6, 2–6
Loss	1–6	Jul 2011	Brazil F19, Manaus	Futures	Clay	(Brazil) Fabiano de Paula	1–6, 6–1, 3–6
Win	2–6	May 2012	Brazil F9, Goiânia	Futures	Clay	(Brazil) Thales Turini	6–7^{(5–7)}, 6–4, 7–5
Loss	2–7	Dec 2013	Brazil F20, Santa Maria	Futures	Clay	(Brazil) José Pereira	5–7, 7–6^{(7–5)}, 2–6
Win	3–7	Dec 2013	Brazil F21, Cascavel	Futures	Clay	(Argentina) Patricio Heras	7–6(3), 6–3
Win	4–7	May 2014	Sweden F1, Karlskrona	Futures	Clay	(Austria) Nicolas Reissig	6–2, 6–3
Win	5–7	May 2014	Sweden F3, Båstad	Futures	Clay	(Sweden) Patrik Rosenholm	6–3, 7–6^{(7–5)}
Win	6–7	Jul 2014	Estonia F1, Tallinn	Futures	Clay	(Sweden) Markus Eriksson	3–6, 6–2, 6–2
Win	7–7	Jul 2014	Denmark F1, Aarhus	Futures	Clay	(Italy) Matteo Donati	6–2, RET
Win	8–7	Jan 2015	Usa F1, Plantation, Florida	Futures	Clay	(Germany) Julian Lenz	7–5, 6–0
Loss	8–8	Apr 2015	Chile F4, Santiago	Futures	Clay	(Chile) Juan Carlos Sáez	6–0, 6–7^{(6–8)}, 3–6
Loss	8–9	May 2015	São Paulo Brazil	Challenger	Clay	(Argentina) Guido Pella	5–7, 6–7^{(1–7)}
Loss	9–9	Mar 2016	Usa F9, Boca Raton, Florida	Futures	Clay	(Argentina) Patricio Heras	4–6, 1–6
Loss	9–10	Oct 2016	Argentina F11, San Juan	Futures	Clay	(Argentina) Federico Coria	6–4, 6–7^{(1–7)}, 6–7^{(0–7)}
Loss	9–11	Jan 2017	Usa F4, Sunrise, Florida	Futures	Clay	(Serbia) Miomir Kecmanović	2–6, 2–6
Win	10–11	Apr 2017	Italy F10, Santa Margherita Di Pula	Futures	Clay	(South Africa) Lloyd Harris	6–4, 6–1
Loss	10–12	Jul 2017	France F13, Montauban	Futures	Clay	(France) Fabien Reboul	6–4, 4–6, 6–7^{(5–7)}
Win	10–13	Dec 2017	Brazil F4, São Carlos	Futures	Clay	(Brazil) João Souza	7–6^{(12–10)}, 7–6^{(9–7)}
Loss	10–14	Nov 2018	Brazil F8, São Paulo	Futures	Clay	(Brazil) João Souza	1–6, 6–7^{(4–7)}
Loss	10–15	Nov 2018	Brazil F9, Ribeirão Preto	Futures	Clay	(Brazil) João Souza	6–4, 4–6, 0–3 RET.
Loss	10–16	Apr 2019	M15 Tabarka, Tunisia	World Tennis Tour	Clay	(Republic of Ireland) Simon Carr	1–6, 3–6
Win	11–16	Apr 2019	M25 Santa Margherita di Pula, Italy	World Tennis Tour	Clay	(France) Hugo Gaston	6–2, 6–0
Loss	11–17	Jun 2019	M15 Kaltenkirchen, Germany	World Tennis Tour	Clay	(Germany) Daniel Altmaier	1–6, 3–6
Win	12–17	Jul 2019	M25 Casinalbo, Italy	World Tennis Tour	Clay	(Australia) Christopher O'Connell	7–6^{(7–5)}, 5–7, 6–3
Win	13–17	Apr 2019	M25 Appiano, Italy	World Tennis Tour	Clay	(Italy) Riccardo Balzerani	6–2, 4–6, 6–3
Loss	13–18	Feb 2020	M25 Weston, Florida, Usa	World Tennis Tour	Clay	(Italy) Gianluigi Quinzi	6–3, 5–7, 5–7

=== Doubles: 13 (7–6) ===
Legend
Challengers (0–2)
Futures (7–4)

Outcome	No.	Date	Tournament	Surface	Partner	Opponents in the final	Score in final
Runner-up	1.	22 August 2010	Brazil F19 Futures Sorocaba, Brazil	Clay (red)	(Brazil) Fabiano de Paula	(Brazil) Thiago Augusto Bitencourt Pinheiro (Brazil) Idio Escobar	2–6, 6–1, 10–5
Runner-up	2.	19 September 2010	Belo Horizonte Challenger, Brazil	Clay (red)	(Brazil) João Souza	(Brazil) Leonardo Kirche (Brazil) Rodrigo-Antonio Grilli	6–3, 6–3
Winner	1.	17 October 2010	Brazil F28 Futures Fernandópolis, Brazil	Clay (red)	(Brazil) Fabricio Neis	(Brazil) Tiago Fernandes (Brazil) Bruno Semenzato	w/o
Winner	2.	3 July 2011	Brazil F19 Futures Manaus, Brazil	Clay (red)	(Brazil) Tiago Lopes	(Brazil) André Miele (Brazil) Diego Matos	7–5, 6–1
Runner-up	3.	12 September 2011	Belo Horizonte Challenger, Brazil	Clay (red)	(Brazil) Ricardo Hocevar	(Argentina) Guido Andreozzi (Argentina) Eduardo Schwank	6–2, 6–4
Winner	3.	30 January 2012	USA F4 Futures Palm Coast, Florida	Clay (red)	(Portugal) Pedro Sousa	(United States) Vahid Mirzadeh (United States) Michael Shabaz	6–7(7), 6–3, 10–8
Runner-up	4.	21 May 2012	Brazil F11 Futures Bauru, Brazil	Clay (red)	(Brazil) Fabiano De Paula	(Brazil) Rodrigo-Antonio Grilli (Brazil) Diego Matos	6–3, 6–3
Winner	4.	28 May 2012	Brazil F12 Futures Teresina, Brazil	Clay (red)	(Brazil) Fabiano De Paula	(Brazil) Wilson Leite (Brazil) Carlos Eduardo Severino	6–4, 7–6(4)
Runner-up	5.	29 April 2013	Sweden F1 Futures Karlskrona, Sweden	Clay (red)	(Sweden) Stefan Milenkovic	(Canada) Érik Chvojka (Sweden) Patrik Rosenholm	6–1, 6–1
Winner	5.	13 May 2013	Sweden F3 Futures Båstad, Sweden	Clay (red)	(Sweden) Milos Sekulic	(Sweden) Jesper Brunstrom (Sweden) Markus Eriksson	3–6, 6–3, 10–6
Winner	6.	2 September 2013	Argentina F12 Futures La Rioja, Argentina	Clay (red)	(Brazil) Daniel Dutra Da Silva	(Argentina) Eduardo Agustin Torre (Italy) Stefano Travaglia	6–2, 4–6, 10–7
Winner	7.	25 November 2013	Brazil F18 Futures Foz do Iguaçu, Brazil	Clay (red)	(Brazil) Wilson Leite	(Brazil) Joaquin-Jesus Monteferrario (Brazil) Facundo Mena	4–6, 6–4, 12–10
Runner-up	6.	9 December 2013	Brazil F20 Futures Santa Maria, Brazil	Clay (red)	(Argentina) Guillermo Duran	(Brazil) José Pereira (Brazil) Alexander Tsuchiya	7–5 6–3
