= Rodrigo-Antonio Grilli =

Brazilian tennis player

- Country (sports): Brazil
- Born: 20 November 1979 (age 45); São Paulo, Brazil
- Plays: Right-handed
- Prize money: $ 72,000

Singles
- Career record: 0–0
- Career titles: 0; 0 Challenger, 3 Futures
- Highest ranking: No. 441 (6 October 2008)

Doubles
- Career record: 0–2
- Career titles: 0; 1 Challenger, 20 Futures
- Highest ranking: No. 198 (12 December 2011)
- Last updated on: 6 March 2017.

Rodrigo-Antonio Grilli (born 20 November 1979) is a Brazilian tennis player.

Grilli has a career high ATP singles ranking of 441 achieved on 6 October 2008. He also has a career high doubles ranking of 198 achieved on 12 December 2011. Grilli has won 1 ATP Challenger doubles title at the 2010 BH Tennis Open International Cup.

Grilli made his ATP main draw debut at the Hamlet Cup in the doubles draw partnering Juan Ignacio Cerda.

== Tour titles ==
Legend
Grand Slam (0)
ATP Masters Series (0)
ATP Tour (0)
Challengers (1)

=== Doubles ===
Result	Date	Category	Tournament	Surface	Partner	Opponents	Score
Winner	19 September 2010	Challenger	Belo Horizonte, Brazil	Hard	(Brazil) Leonardo Kirche	(Sweden) Christian Lindell / (Brazil) João Souza	6–3, 6–3
