= André Miele =

Brazilian tennis player

- Country (sports): Brazil
- Born: 12 April 1987 (age 39) Ribeirão Preto, Brazil
- Height: 1.74 m (5 ft 8 1/2 in)
- Plays: Right-handed (two-handed backhand)
- Prize money: $176,218

Singles
- Career record: 0–0 (ATP Tour, Grand Slams, and Davis Cup)
- Career titles: 0; 0 Challenger, 7 Futures
- Highest ranking: No. 229 (4 August 2008)

Grand Slam singles results
- French Open: Q1 (2009)
- Wimbledon: Q1 (2009)
- US Open: Q1 (2008)

Doubles
- Career record: 0–0 (ATP Tour, Grand Slams, and Davis Cup)
- Career titles: 0; 1 Challenger, 33 Futures
- Highest ranking: No. 179 (14 September 2009)

André Luís Volpe Miele (born 12 April 1987) (also spelled Andre Miele), is a tennis player from Brazil. He was elected the best junior in Brazil in 2003. He and his partner Ricardo Hocevar won the 2009 Manta Open doubles championship.

== ATP Challenger and ITF Futures finals ==
=== Singles: 20 (7–13) ===
Legend ATP Challenger (0–0) ITF Futures (7–13)	Finals by surface Hard (0–2) Clay (7–11) Grass (0–0) Carpet (0–0)

Result	W–L	Date	Tournament	Tier	Surface	Opponent	Score
Loss	0-1	May 2007	Brazil F3, São Paulo	Futures	Clay	(Brazil) João Souza	3–6, 2–6
Loss	0-2	Oct 2007	Brazil F18, Arapongas	Futures	Clay	(Brazil) Alexandre Bonatto	2–6, 1–6
Loss	0-3	May 2008	Brazil F3, São Roque	Futures	Clay	(Brazil) Rogério Dutra Silva	7–5, 2–6, 4–6
Loss	0-4	May 2008	Brazil F4, Rio Quente	Futures	Hard	(Uruguay) Marcel Felder	1–6, 4–6
Win	1-4	Jun 2008	Brazil F6, Brasília	Futures	Clay	(Uruguay) Marcel Felder	6–2, 6–3
Win	2-4	Jul 2008	Brazil F11, Ribeirão Preto	Futures	Clay	(Brazil) Leonardo Kirche	7–6^{(8–6)}, 3–6, 6–1
Win	3-4	Jul 2008	Brazil F12, Brasília	Futures	Clay	(Brazil) Eladio Ribeiro Neto	6–2, 6–2
Loss	3-5	Feb 2009	Colombia F2, Cartagena	Futures	Hard	(Colombia) Carlos Salamanca	3–6, 7–6^{(9–7)}, 4–6
Loss	3-6	Aug 2009	Brazil F16, São José do Rio Preto	Futures	Clay	(Chile) Jorge Aguilar	6–3, 3–6, 6–7^{(2–7)}
Loss	3-7	Nov 2009	Brazil F29, Fernandópolis	Futures	Clay	(Greece) Theodoros Angelinos	7–6^{(9–7)}, 1–6, 1–6
Win	4-7	Aug 2010	Brazil F19, São José dos Campos	Futures	Clay	(Sweden) Christian Lindell	6–4, 1–6, 6–4
Win	5-7	Sep 2010	Brazil F22, São José do Rio Preto	Futures	Clay	(Argentina) Juan-Pablo Amado	6–3, 6–2
Loss	5-8	Oct 2010	Brazil F28, Fernandópolis	Futures	Clay	(Sweden) Christian Lindell	6–7^{(6–8)}, 2–6
Loss	5-9	Nov 2010	Brazil F31, Porto Alegre	Futures	Clay	(Brazil) André Ghem	4–6, 1–6
Loss	5-10	May 2011	Brazil F14, Goiânia	Futures	Clay	(Brazil) Guilherme Clezar	6–4, 3–6, 6–7^{(3–7)}
Loss	5-11	Oct 2011	Brazil F35, Lins	Futures	Clay	(Brazil) Fernando Romboli	1–6, 2–6
Win	6-11	Oct 2012	Brazil F31, Santa Maria	Futures	Clay	(Argentina) Joaquin-Jesus Monteferrario	2–6, 6–1, 6–3
Loss	6-12	Nov 2012	Brazil F33, São Paulo	Futures	Clay	(Brazil) Daniel Dutra da Silva	3–6, 6–3, 3–6
Loss	6-13	Jun 2013	Egypt F13, Sharm El Sheikh	Futures	Clay	(Egypt) Karim Hossam	2–6, 3–6
Win	7-13	Aug 2014	Brazil F8, São José do Rio Preto	Futures	Clay	(Brazil) Bruno Sant'Anna	6–2, 6–4

=== Doubles: 63 (34–29) ===
Legend ATP Challenger (1–3) ITF Futures (33–26)	Finals by surface Hard (7–5) Clay (27–24) Grass (0–0) Carpet (0–0)

Result	W–L	Date	Tournament	Tier	Surface	Partner	Opponents	Score
Win	1–0	Sep 2006	Brazil F9, Itajaí	Futures	Clay	(Brazil) Marcelo Melo	(Brazil) Henrique Pinto-Silva (Brazil) Gabriel Pitta	6–7^{(7–9)}, 7–6^{(7–3)}, 6–1
Loss	1–1	Oct 2006	Brazil F15, Londrina	Futures	Clay	(Brazil) João Souza	(Brazil) Leonardo Kirche (Brazil) Caio Zampieri	6–3, 2–6, 6–7^{(1–7)}
Loss	1–2	Nov 2006	Brazil F17, São Paulo	Futures	Clay	(Brazil) João Souza	(Hungary) György Balázs (Hungary) Kornél Bardóczky	2–6, 4–6
Win	2–2	Nov 2006	Brazil F20, Criciúma	Futures	Clay	(Brazil) João Souza	(Ecuador) Carlos Avellán (Brazil) Tiago Lopes	6–4, 6–4
Win	3–2	Dec 2006	Brazil F21, Uruguaiana	Futures	Clay	(Brazil) João Souza	(Brazil) Caio Zampieri (Brazil) Tiago Lopes	7–6^{(7–5)}, 6–2
Loss	3–3	Apr 2007	Florianópolis, Brazil	Challenger	Clay	(Brazil) João Souza	(Uruguay) Pablo Cuevas (Argentina) Horacio Zeballos	4–6, 4–6
Loss	3–4	May 2007	Brazil F3, São Paulo	Futures	Clay	(Brazil) João Souza	(Brazil) Henrique Pinto-Silva (Brazil) Gabriel Pitta	4–6, 4–6
Loss	3–5	May 2007	Brazil F4, Caldas Novas	Futures	Hard	(Brazil) João Souza	(Brazil) Caio Zampieri (Brazil) Renato Silveira	4–6, 7–6, 1–6
Win	4–5	May 2007	Brazil F5, Chapecó	Futures	Clay	(Brazil) João Souza	(Brazil) Thomaz Bellucci (Brazil) Caio Burjaili	2–6, 6–2, 6–2
Win	5–5	Nov 2007	Brazil F20, Itu	Futures	Clay	(Brazil) João Souza	(Brazil) Raony Carvalho (Brazil) Rodrigo-Antonio Grilli	2–6, 6–4, [10–7]
Win	6–5	Jan 2008	Colombia F1, Manizales	Futures	Clay	(Brazil) João Souza	(Italy) Matteo Marrai (Italy) Walter Trusendi	6–4, 6–4
Loss	6–6	May 2008	Brazil F2, Itu	Futures	Clay	(Brazil) Ricardo Hocevar	(Brazil) Alexandre Bonatto (Brazil) Rafael Camilo	6–1, 3–6, [5–10]
Loss	6–7	May 2008	Brazil F3, São Roque	Futures	Clay	(Brazil) Ricardo Hocevar	(Bolivia) Mauricio Doria-Medina (Brazil) Rodrigo-Antonio Grilli	4–6, 3–6
Win	7–7	May 2008	Brazil F4, Caldas Novas	Futures	Hard	(Brazil) Marcelo Demoliner	(Bolivia) Mauricio Doria-Medina (Brazil) Rodrigo-Antonio Grilli	6–4, 3–6, [10–6]
Loss	7–8	May 2008	Brazil F5, Uberlândia	Futures	Clay	(Brazil) Marcelo Demoliner	(Bolivia) Mauricio Doria-Medina (Brazil) Rodrigo-Antonio Grilli	6–7^{(3–7)}, 6–7^{(3–7)}
Loss	7–9	Jun 2008	Brazil F6, Brasília	Futures	Clay	(Brazil) Marcelo Demoliner	(Brazil) Rafael Camilo (Brazil) Rodrigo Guidolin	6–7^{(4–7)}, 6–7^{(2–7)}
Win	8–9	Jul 2008	Brazil F12, Brasília	Futures	Clay	(Brazil) Marcelo Demoliner	(Brazil) Fernando Romboli (Brazil) Tiago Lopes	7–5, 6–4
Loss	8–10	Oct 2008	Florianópolis, Brazil	Challenger	Clay	(Brazil) Ricardo Hocevar	(Brazil) Júlio Silva (Brazil) Rogério Dutra Silva	6–3, 4–6, [4–10]
Loss	8–11	Feb 2009	Colombia F2, Cartagena	Futures	Hard	(Brazil) Eric Gomes	(Colombia) Carlos Salamanca (Colombia) Juan Sebastián Cabal	3–6, 5–7
Win	9–11	May 2009	Brazil F1, Campinas	Futures	Clay	(Brazil) Fernando Romboli	(Brazil) Marcelo Demoliner (Brazil) Rodrigo Guidolin	7–6^{(7–5)}, 5–7, [10–8]
Win	10–11	Jul 2009	Manta, Ecuador	Challenger	Hard	(Brazil) Ricardo Hocevar	(Mexico) Santiago González (Argentina) Horacio Zeballos	6–1, 2–6, [10–7]
Win	11–11	Aug 2009	Brazil F16, Sao Jose Do Rio Preto	Futures	Clay	(Brazil) Fernando Romboli	(France) Marc Auradou (Brazil) Rodrigo-Antonio Grilli	7–6^{(7–3)}, 6–1
Win	12–11	Sep 2009	Brazil F17, Uberaba	Futures	Clay	(Brazil) Tiago Lopes	(France) Marc Auradou (Brazil) Rodrigo-Antonio Grilli	4–6, 6–3, [10–1]
Win	13–11	Sep 2009	Brazil F19, Recife	Futures	Clay	(Brazil) Fernando Romboli	(Brazil) Alexandre Bonatto (Brazil) Leonardo Kirche	6–3, 6–0
Loss	13–12	Oct 2009	Brazil F22, Bauru	Futures	Clay	(Argentina) Juan-Pablo Amado	(Ecuador) Emilio Gómez (Ecuador) Roberto Quiroz	4–6, 6–0, [8–10]
Loss	13–13	Nov 2009	Brazil F29, Fernandópolis	Futures	Clay	(Brazil) Diego Matos	(Brazil) Rodrigo-Antonio Grilli (Brazil) Carlos Oliveira	3–6, 7–5, [9–11]
Win	14–13	Dec 2009	Brazil F31, Araçatuba	Futures	Clay	(Brazil) Diego Matos	(Brazil) Rodrigo Guidolin (Brazil) Fabrício Neis	6–4, 6–4
Win	15–13	Mar 2010	Portugal F3, Albufeira	Futures	Hard	(Brazil) Diego Matos	(Portugal) Frederico Ferreira Silva (Portugal) Diogo Soares	6–1, 6–4
Win	16–13	May 2010	Brazil F6, Caldas Novas	Futures	Hard	(Brazil) Franco Ferreiro	(Mexico) Luis Díaz Barriga (Mexico) Miguel Ángel Reyes-Varela	6–3, 6–4
Loss	16–14	Sep 2010	Brazil F23, Fortaleza	Futures	Clay	(Brazil) Diego Matos	(Brazil) Fernando Romboli (Uruguay) Marcel Felder	6–7^{(4–7)}, 6–4, [4–10]
Loss	16–15	Nov 2010	Brazil F31, Porto Alegre	Futures	Clay	(Brazil) Diego Matos	(Brazil) Nicolas Santos (Brazil) Daniel Dutra da Silva	4–6, 1–6
Win	17–15	Jan 2011	Brazil F3, Aracaju	Futures	Clay	(Brazil) Danilo Ferraz	(Brazil) Gabriel Dias (Brazil) Marlon Oliveira	7–6^{(11–9)}, 6–4
Win	18–15	May 2011	Brazil F13, Caldas Novas	Futures	Hard	(Brazil) Danilo Ferraz	(Brazil) Ricardo Siggia (Brazil) Thales Turini	3–6, 6–4, [12–10]
Win	19–15	Jun 2011	Brazil F16, Marilia	Futures	Clay	(Brazil) Tiago Lopes	(Argentina) Guido Andreozzi (Uruguay) Martín Cuevas	2–6, 6–4, [10–6]
Win	20–15	Jun 2011	Brazil F17, Curitiba	Futures	Clay	(Brazil) Diego Matos	(Brazil) André Ghem (Brazil) Rodrigo Guidolin	6–2, 7–6^{(7–5)}
Win	20–16	Jul 2011	Brazil F19, Manaus	Futures	Clay	(Brazil) Diego Matos	(Sweden) Christian Lindell (Brazil) Tiago Lopes	5–7, 1–6
Win	21–16	Jul 2011	Brazil F21, Curitiba	Futures	Clay	(Brazil) Tiago Lopes	(Brazil) Gabriel Vicentini Pereira (Brazil) Fabrício Neis	6–3, 6–7^{(6–8)}, [11–9]
Win	22–16	Aug 2011	Brazil F26, Sao Jose Do Rio Preto	Futures	Clay	(Brazil) Rodrigo-Antonio Grilli	(Brazil) Carlos Oliveira (Brazil) Augusto Laranja	6–4, 6–3
Loss	22–17	Oct 2011	Recife, Brazil	Challenger	NHard	(Brazil) Rodrigo-Antonio Grilli	(Argentina) Guido Andreozzi (Uruguay) Marcel Felder	3–6, 3–6
Win	23–17	Jun 2012	Brazil F14, Fortaleza	Futures	Clay	(Brazil) Fabrício Neis	(Argentina) Maximiliano Estévez (Brazil) Leonardo Kirche	6–3, 6–7^{(3–7)}, [10–7]
Loss	23–18	Aug 2012	Brazil F22, São Paulo	Futures	Clay	(Brazil) Rodrigo-Antonio Grilli	(Brazil) Fabiano de Paula (Brazil) João Pedro Sorgi	2–6, 4–6
Loss	23–19	Oct 2012	Brazil F31, Santa Maria	Futures	Clay	(Brazil) Alexandre Tsuchiya	(Brazil) Daniel Dutra da Silva (Brazil) Caio Silva	2–6, 7–6^{(7–5)}, [7–10]
Loss	23–20	Nov 2012	Brazil F32, Porto Alegre	Futures	Clay	(Brazil) Caio Zampieri	(Brazil) Fabrício Neis (Brazil) Thales Turini	4–6, 6–7^{(4–7)}
Win	24–20	Nov 2012	Brazil F33, São Paulo	Futures	Clay	(Brazil) Alexandre Tsuchiya	(Brazil) Daniel Dutra da Silva (Argentina) Joaquin-Jesus Monteferrario	6–4, 7–6^{(7–3)}
Loss	24–21	Jun 2013	Egypt F10, Sharm El Sheikh	Futures	Clay	(Brazil) João Pedro Sorgi	(Belgium) Joris de Loore (Belgium) Jeroen Vanneste	4–6, 4–6
Win	25–21	Jun 2013	Egypt F11, Sharm El Sheikh	Futures	Clay	(Brazil) João Pedro Sorgi	(Russia) Evgeny Elistratov (Russia) Andrey Saveliev	6–3, 6–3
Win	26–21	Jun 2013	Egypt F12, Sharm El Sheikh	Futures	Clay	(Brazil) João Pedro Sorgi	(New Zealand) Ryoma Sloane (Norway) Oystein Steiro	6–4, 6–4
Win	27–21	Jun 2013	Egypt F13, Sharm El Sheikh	Futures	Clay	(Brazil) João Pedro Sorgi	(Italy) Francesco Garzelli (Italy) Omar Giacalone	6–2, 2–6, [10–3]
Win	28–21	Aug 2013	Brazil F5, Natal	Futures	Clay	(Brazil) João Pedro Sorgi	(Brazil) Eduardo Dischinger (Brazil) Bruno Sant'Anna	6–4, 6–2
Win	29–21	Aug 2013	Brazil F6, Campos do Jordão	Futures	Hard	(Brazil) João Pedro Sorgi	(Brazil) Alexandre Tsuchiya (Brazil) José Pereira	6–4, 6–4
Loss	29–22	Mar 2014	Argentina F5, Rosario	Futures	Clay	(Brazil) Leonardo Kirche	(Bolivia) Hugo Dellien (Argentina) Facundo Mena	4–6, 6–0, [5–10]
Win	30–22	Aug 2014	Brazil F8, Sao Jose Do Rio Preto	Futures	Clay	(Brazil) Alexandre Tsuchiya	(Brazil) Pedro Sakamoto (Brazil) João Pedro Sorgi	6–3, 6–7^{(3–7)}, [10–6]
Loss	30–23	Mar 2015	Argentina F3, Olavarria	Futures	Clay	(Brazil) Alexandre Tsuchiya	(Brazil) Eduardo Dischinger (Argentina) Thales Turini	6–3, 4–6, [11–13]
Loss	30–24	Apr 2015	Chile F4, Santiago	Futures	Clay	(Brazil) Alexandre Tsuchiya	(Chile) Jorge Aguilar (Peru) Duilio Beretta	1–6, 4–6
Win	31–24	May 2015	Argentina F7, Villa Allende	Futures	Clay	(Brazil) Alexandre Tsuchiya	(Argentina) Juan Ignacio Galarza (Argentina) Nicolás Kicker	4–6, 6–2, [10–6]
Loss	31–25	Aug 2015	Brazil F4, Belém	Futures	Hard	(Brazil) Alexandre Tsuchiya	(Ecuador) Emilio Gómez (Brazil) Igor Marcondes	7–6^{(7–5)}, 6–7^{(3–7)}, [14–16]
Loss	31–26	Aug 2015	Brazil F5, Sao Jose Do Rio Preto	Futures	Clay	(Brazil) Alexandre Tsuchiya	(Brazil) João Pedro Sorgi (Brazil) Fabrício Neis	6–3, 4–6, [10–12]
Win	32–26	Sep 2015	Bolivia F1, Santa Cruz	Futures	Clay	(Brazil) Alexandre Tsuchiya	(Bolivia) Rodrigo Banzer (Bolivia) Federico Zeballos	6–0, 6–7^{(4–7)}, [10–2]
Win	33–26	Nov 2015	Bolivia F7, Santa Maria	Futures	Clay	(Brazil) Franco Ferreiro	(Brazil) Wilson Leite (Brazil) Bruno Sant'Anna	6–4, 0–6, [13–11]
Win	34–26	Jul 2016	Brazil F4, Campos do Jordão	Futures	Hard	(Brazil) Ricardo Hocevar	(Brazil) Leonardo Civita-Telles (Brazil) Gabriel Décamps	7–6^{(10–8)}, 6–4
Loss	34–27	Jun 2017	Argentina F2, Córdoba	Futures	Clay	(Brazil) Nicolas Santos	(Argentina) Facundo Argüello (Argentina) Tomás Lipovšek Puches	2–6, 2–6
Loss	34–28	Sep 2017	Argentina F5, Neuquén	Futures	Clay	(Brazil) Daniel Dutra da Silva	(Argentina) Mariano Kestelboim (Argentina) Tomás Lipovšek Puches	6–1, 1–6, [9–11]
Loss	34–29	Nov 2018	Brazil F9, Ribeirão Preto	Futures	Clay	(Brazil) Rafael Matos	(Brazil) João Lucas Reis da Silva (Brazil) Fernando Yamacita	1–6, 6–7^{(3–7)}
