= Leonardo Kirche =

Brazilian tennis player

- Country (sports): Brazil
- Residence: Santa Bárbara d'Oeste, Brazil
- Born: 4 January 1985 (age 40); Santa Bárbara d'Oeste, Brazil
- Height: 1.88 m (6 ft 2 in)
- Turned pro: 2003
- Plays: Right-handed
- Prize money: US$148,572

Singles
- Career record: 1–0
- Career titles: 0
- Highest ranking: No. 196 (4 February 2013)

Doubles
- Career record: 0–0
- Career titles: 0
- Highest ranking: No. 298 (15 August 2011)
- Last updated on: 1 October 2018.

Leonardo Kirche (born 4 January 1985) is a Brazilian tennis player playing on the ATP Challenger Tour. He has played one match for the Brazil Davis Cup team.

== Challenger finals ==
=== Singles: 1 (0–1) ===
Legend
ATP Challenger Tour (0–1)

| Outcome | No. | Date | Tournament | Surface | Opponent in the final | Score |
|---|---|---|---|---|---|---|
| Runner-up | 1. | 23 September 2012 | Campinas, Brazil | Clay | (Argentina) Guido Pella | 4–6, 0–6 |

=== Doubles: 2 (1–1) ===
Legend
ATP Challenger Tour (1–1)

| Outcome | No. | Date | Tournament | Surface | Partner | Opponents in the final | Score |
|---|---|---|---|---|---|---|---|
| Winner | 1. | 18 September 2010 | Belo Horizonte, Brazil | Clay | (Brazil) Rodrigo Grilli | (Sweden) Christian Lindell (Brazil) João Souza | 6–3, 6–3 |
| Runner-up | 2. | 11 May 2013 | Rio Quente, Brazil | Hard | (Brazil) Ricardo Hocevar | (Brazil) Fabiano de Paula (Brazil) Marcelo Demoliner | 3–6, 4–6 |
