= Márcio Torres =

Brazilian tennis player

- Country (sports): Brazil
- Born: 24 January 1981 (age 44); Belo Horizonte
- Plays: Right-handed (Double-handed backhand)
- Prize money: $74,124 USD

Singles
- Career record: 0–0 (ATP Tour level, Grand Slam level, and Davis Cup)
- Career titles: 0
- Highest ranking: No. 712 (20 August 2007)

Doubles
- Career record: 0–2 (ATP Tour level, Grand Slam level, and Davis Cup)
- Career titles: 0
- Highest ranking: 132 (14 April 2008)
- Last updated on: January 30, 2012.

Márcio Torres (born 24 January 1981) is a tennis player from Brazil. He played in the doubles main draw in an ATP 250 event in Los Angeles in 2011.

== Sources ==
- Márcio Torres at the Association of Tennis Professionals
- Márcio Torres at the International Tennis Federation
- Main draw notability in doubles in 2011
