= Júlio Silva =

Brazilian tennis player

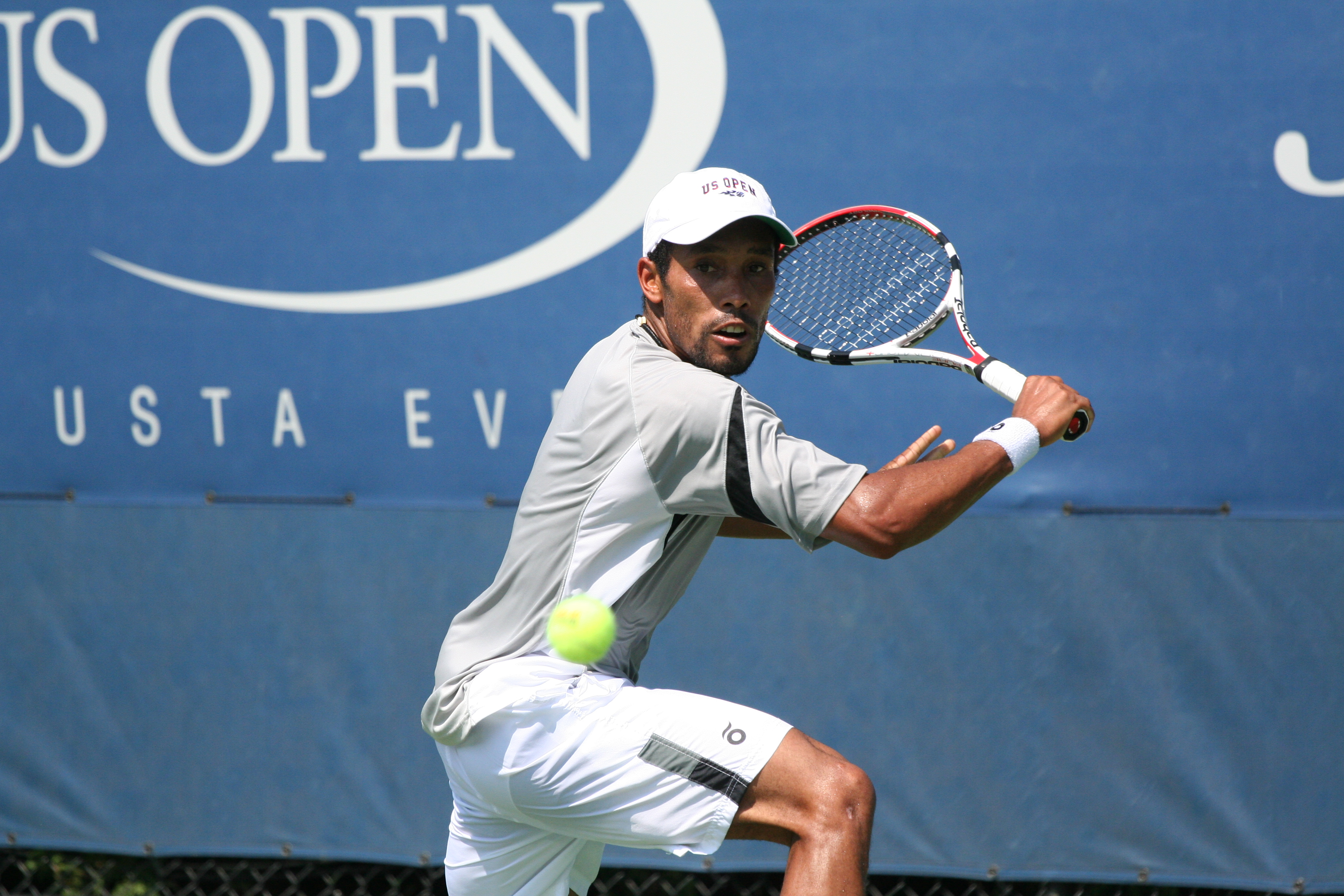
- Country (sports): Brazil
- Residence: Jundiaí, Brazil
- Born: 1 July 1979 (age 45); Jundiaí, Brazil
- Height: 1.72 m (5 ft 7 1/2 in)
- Turned pro: 1999
- Plays: Right-handed (two-handed backhand)
- Prize money: $397,704

Singles
- Career record: 3–10 (ATP Tour and Grand Slam-level, and in Davis Cup)
- Career titles: 0
- Highest ranking: No. 144 (16 November 2009)

Grand Slam singles results
- Australian Open: Q3 (2007)
- French Open: 1R (2006)
- Wimbledon: Q1 (2010, 2012)
- US Open: 1R (2010)

Doubles
- Career record: 0–1 (ATP Tour and Grand Slam-level, and in Davis Cup)
- Career titles: 0
- Highest ranking: No. 135 (2 March 2009)

Júlio Silva (Brazilian Portuguese: [ˈʒulju ˈsiwvɐ]; born 1 July 1979) is a professional tennis player from Brazil who turned professional in 1999.

He reached his highest singles ATP-ranking of World No. 144 in November 2009.

== ATP and Grand Slam titles (12) ==
=== Singles (4) ===
Legend Grand Slam (0) Tennis Masters Cup (0) ATP Masters Series (0) ATP Tour (0) Challengers (4)	Titles by surface Hard (2) Grass (0) Clay (2) Carpet (0)

No.	Date	Tournament	Surface	Opponent	Score
1.	August 5, 2002	Gramado, Brazil	Hard	(Peru) Iván Miranda	6–4, 6–2
2.	October 24, 2005	Santiago, Chile	Clay	(Spain) Rubén Ramírez Hidalgo	6–2, 6–3
3.	August 2, 2009	Belo Horizonte, Brazil	Hard	(Argentina) Eduardo Schwank	4–6, 6–3, 6–4
4.	September 18, 2011	Belo Horizonte, Brazil	Clay	(Portugal) Gastão Elias	6–4, 6–4

=== Doubles (8) ===
Legend Grand Slam (0) Tennis Masters Cup (0) ATP Masters Series (0) ATP Tour (0) Challengers (8)	Titles by surface Hard (3) Grass (0) Clay (5) Carpet (0)

No.	Date	Tournament	Surface	Partnering	Opponents	Score
1.	March 13, 2006	Salinas, Ecuador	Hard	(Brazil) Thiago Alves	(Brazil) André Ghem (Brazil) Alexandre Simoni	3–6, 6–4, [10–4]
2.	March 10, 2008	Salinas, Ecuador	Hard	(Brazil) Caio Zampieri	(Argentina) Sebastián Decoud (Belgium) Dick Norman	7–6^{(8–6)}, 6–2
3.	May 12, 2008	Zagreb, Croatia	Clay	(Croatia) Ivan Dodig	(Ukraine) Sergiy Stakhovsky (Czech Republic) Tomáš Zíb	6–4, 7–6^{(7–1)}
4.	July 7, 2008	San Benedetto, Italy	Clay	(Italy) Paolo Lorenzi	(Romania) Cătălin Gârd (Austria) Max Raditschnigg	6–3, 7–5
5.	October 12, 2008	Florianópolis, Brazil	Clay	(Brazil) Rogério Dutra da Silva	(Brazil) Ricardo Hocevar (Brazil) André Miele	3–6, 6–4, [10–4]
6.	June 5, 2011	Rijeka, Croatia	Clay	(Italy) Paolo Lorenzi	(Croatia) Lovro Zovko (Croatia) Dino Marcan	6–3, 6–2
7.	January 7, 2012	São Paulo, Brazil	Hard	(Brazil) Fernando Romboli	(Slovakia) Jozef Kovalík (Brazil) José Pereira	7–5, 6–2
8.	November 10, 2012	São Leopoldo, Brazil	Clay	(Brazil) Fabiano de Paula	(Uruguay) Ariel Behar (Argentina) Horacio Zeballos	6–1, 7–6^{(7–5)}

== ATP and Grand Slam runners-up (10) ==
=== Singles (4) ===
Legend Grand Slam (0) Tennis Masters Cup (0) ATP Masters Series (0) ATP Tour (0) Challengers (4)	Finals by surface Hard (0) Grass (0) Clay (4) Carpet (0)

No.	Date	Tournament	Surface	Opponent	Score
1.	November 29, 2004	Aracaju, Brazil	Clay	(Ecuador) Nicolás Lapentti	6–2, 6–2
2.	May 14, 2007	Zagreb, Croatia	Clay	(Serbia) Janko Tipsarević	3–6, 6–3, 6–3
3.	July 23, 2007	Poznań, Poland	Clay	(Netherlands) Raemon Sluiter	6–4, 6–3
4.	April 28, 2012	São Paulo, Brazil	Clay	(Slovenia) Blaž Kavčič	6–3, 7–5

=== Doubles (6) ===
Legend Grand Slam (0) Tennis Masters Cup (0) ATP Masters Series (0) ATP Tour (0) Challengers (6)	Finals by surface Hard (1) Grass (0) Clay (5) Carpet (0)

No.	Date	Tournament	Surface	Partnering	Opponents	Score
1.	April 10, 2006	Florianópolis, Brazil	Clay	(Brazil) Thiago Alves	(Argentina) Máximo González (Argentina) Sergio Roitman	6–2, 3–6, [10–5]
2.	June 24, 2008	Constanța, Romania	Clay	(Italy) Simone Vagnozzi	(Romania) Florin Mergea (Romania) Horia Tecău	6–4, 6–2
3.	November 24, 2008	Lima, Peru	Clay	(Paraguay) Ramón Delgado	(Peru) Luis Horna (Argentina) Sebastián Prieto	6–3, 6–3
4.	April 6, 2009	San Luis Potosí, Mexico	Clay	(Brazil) Franco Ferreiro	(Mexico) Santiago González (Argentina) Horacio Zeballos	6–2, 7–6^{(7–5)}
5.	August 6, 2011	Campos do Jordão, Brazil	Hard	(Brazil) Ricardo Hocevar	(Colombia) Juan Sebastián Cabal (Colombia) Robert Farah	6–2, 6–3
6.	April 22, 2012	Santos, Brazil	Clay	(Brazil) Rogério Dutra da Silva	(Argentina) Andrés Molteni (Argentina) Marco Trungelliti	6–4, 6–3
