= Ricardo Hocevar =

Brazilian tennis player

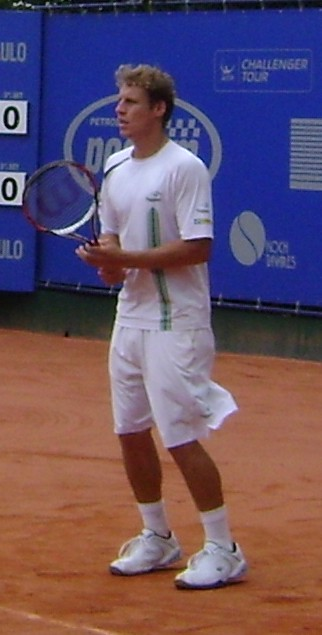
- Country (sports): Brazil
- Residence: São Paulo, Brazil
- Born: 5 May 1985 (age 40) São Paulo, Brazil
- Height: 1.80 m (5 ft 11 in)
- Turned pro: 2003
- Plays: Right-handed (two-handed backhand)
- Coach: Pablo Albano
- Prize money: $363,656

Singles
- Career record: 0–5 (ATP World Tour level, Grand Slam level, and Davis Cup)
- Career titles: 0
- Highest ranking: No. 149 (15 June 2009)

Grand Slam singles results
- Australian Open: 1R (2010)
- French Open: Q3 (2010)
- Wimbledon: Q2 (2009)
- US Open: Q2 (2008)

Doubles
- Career record: 0–1 (ATP World Tour level, Grand Slam level, and Davis Cup)
- Career titles: 0
- Highest ranking: No. 148 (21 September 2009)
- Last updated on: 13 January 2018.

Ricardo Hocevar (Slovene: Hočevar; born 5 May 1985) is a Brazilian former professional tennis player.

Hocevar was born in São Paulo, of Slovene descent.

== ATP Challenger finals ==
=== Singles: 3 (1–2) ===
Legend
ATP Challenger Series

Outcome	No.	Date	Tournament	Surface	Opponent	Score
Runner-up	1.	7 July 2008	Bogotá, Colombia	Clay	(Argentina) Mariano Puerta	6–7^{(2–7)}, 5–7
Runner-up	2.	16 April 2012	Santos, Brazil	Clay	(Czech Republic) Ivo Minář	6–4, 1–6, 4–6
Winner	1.	1 October 2012	Belém, Brazil	Hard	(Netherlands) Thiemo de Bakker	7–6^{(7–1)}, 7–6^{(7–4)}

=== Doubles: 9 (1–8) ===
Legend
ATP Challenger Series

Outcome	No.	Date	Tournament	Surface	Partner	Opponents	Score
Runner-up	1.	2 April 2007	Monza, Italy	Clay	(Brazil) Alexandre Simoni	(Australia) Nathan Healey (Australia) Jordan Kerr	4–6, 3–6
Runner-up	2.	6 October 2008	Florianópolis, Brazil	Clay	(Brazil) André Miele	(Brazil) Rogério Dutra Silva (Brazil) Júlio Silva	6–3, 4–6, [4–10]
Runner-up	3.	3 November 2008	Guayaquil, Ecuador	Clay	(Brazil) Thiago Alves	(Argentina) Sebastián Decoud (Colombia) Santiago Giraldo	4–6, 4–6
Winner	1.	20 July 2009	Manta, Ecuador	Hard	(Brazil) André Miele	(Mexico) Santiago González (Argentina) Horacio Zeballos	6–1, 2–6, [10–7]
Runner-up	4.	14 September 2009	Cali, Colombia	Clay	(Brazil) João Souza	(Argentina) Sebastián Prieto (Argentina) Horacio Zeballos	6–4, 3–6, [5–10]
Runner-up	5.	7 June 2010	Košice, Slovakia	Clay	(Brazil) Caio Zampieri	(Slovakia) Miloslav Mečíř (Slovakia) Marek Semjan	6–3, 1–6, [11–13]
Runner-up	6.	1 August 2011	Campos do Jordão, Brazil	Hard	(Brazil) Júlio Silva	(Colombia) Juan Sebastián Cabal (Colombia) Robert Farah	2–6, 3–6
Runner-up	7.	12 September 2011	Belo Horizonte, Brazil	Clay	(Sweden) Christian Lindell	(Argentina) Guido Andreozzi (Argentina) Eduardo Schwank	2–6, 4–6
Runner-up	8.	6 June 2013	Rio Quente, Brazil	Hard	(Brazil) Leonardo Kirche	(Brazil) Fabiano de Paula (Brazil) Marcelo Demoliner	3–6, 4–6
