= 2009 Aberto Santa Catarina de Tenis – Doubles =

Doubles
- 2009 Aberto Santa Catarina de Tenis

Final
- Champions: (Brazil) Marcelo Demoliner (Brazil) Rodrigo Guidolin
- Runners-up: (Brazil) Rogério Dutra da Silva (Brazil) Júlio Silva
- Score: 7–5, 4–6, [13–11]

Events
Singles	Doubles
← 2008 ·	Aberto Santa Catarina de Tenis	· 2010 →

Adrián García and Leonardo Mayer were the defending champions, but they chose to not participate this year.
Marcelo Demoliner and Rodrigo Guidolin won in the final 7–5, 4–6, [13–11], against Rogério Dutra da Silva and Júlio Silva.

== Seeds ==
1. (Brazil) Rogério Dutra da Silva / (Brazil) Júlio Silva (final)
2. (Brazil) Marcelo Demoliner / (Brazil) Rodrigo Guidolin (champions)
3. (Brazil) André Miele / (Brazil) Daniel Silva (semifinals)
4. (Brazil) Eric Gomes / (Brazil) Tiago Lopes (semifinals)

== Draw ==
=== Key ===
- Q = Qualifier
- WC = Wild card
- LL = Lucky loser
- Alt = Alternate
- SE = Special exempt
- PR = Protected ranking
- ITF = ITF entry
- JE = Junior exempt
- w/o = Walkover
- r = Retired
- d = Defaulted
- SR = Special ranking

=== Draw ===
First round
1	(Brazil) R Dutra da Silva (Brazil) J Silva	6	6
WC	(Brazil) G Fischer (Brazil) P Passold	1	2
(Brazil) A Bonatto (Brazil) R Camilo	6	6
(Germany) A Begemann (United States) E Nunez	3	4
4	(Brazil) E Gomes (Brazil) T Lopes	6	6
WC	(Brazil) A Baran (Brazil) R Machado	0	2
(Argentina) J-P Amado (Colombia) M Quintero	5	7	[7]
(Brazil) F Neis (Portugal) L Tavares	7	5	[10]
(Ecuador) JC Campozano (Argentina) A Kon	6	6
(Germany) G Kretschmer (Italy) F Torresi	3	4
(Chile) C Saavedra (Serbia) D Savić	6^{5}	6	[4]
3	(Brazil) A Miele (Brazil) D Silva	7	2	[10]
(Brazil) G Kleine (Brazil) B Wolkmann	0	6	[2]
(Uruguay) M Felder (Argentina) G Tur	6	4	[10]
WC	(Brazil) R Schaefer (Brazil) T Turini	1	4
2	(Brazil) M Demoliner (Brazil) R Guidolin	6	6

Quarterfinals
1	(Brazil) R Dutra da Silva (Brazil) J Silva	4	6	[12]
(Brazil) A Bonatto (Brazil) R Camilo	6	3	[10]
4	(Brazil) E Gomes (Brazil) T Lopes	7	6
(Brazil) F Neis (Portugal) L Tavares	5	4
(Ecuador) JC Campozano (Argentina) A Kon	w/o
3	(Brazil) A Miele (Brazil) D Silva
(Uruguay) M Felder (Argentina) G Tur	1	2
2	(Brazil) M Demoliner (Brazil) R Guidolin	6	6

Semifinals
1	(Brazil) R Dutra da Silva (Brazil) J Silva	6	6
4	(Brazil) E Gomes (Brazil) T Lopes	2	4
3	(Brazil) A Miele (Brazil) D Silva	2	1
2	(Brazil) M Demoliner (Brazil) R Guidolin	6	6

Finals
1	(Brazil) R Dutra da Silva (Brazil) J Silva	5	6	[11]
2	(Brazil) M Demoliner (Brazil) R Guidolin	7	4	[13]
