= 2012 Aberto Santa Catarina de Tenis – Singles =

Singles
- 2012 Aberto Santa Catarina de Tenis

Final
- Champion: (Croatia) Antonio Veić
- Runner-up: (Chile) Paul Capdeville
- Score: 3–6, 6–4, 5–2, retired

Events
Singles	Doubles
← 2011 ·	Aberto Santa Catarina de Tenis	· 2022 →

José Acasuso was the defending champion but decided not to participate.
Antonio Veić won the title when his opponent Paul Capdeville retired during the final match. Veić was leading 3–6, 6–4, 5–2.

== Seeds ==
1. (Slovenia) Blaž Kavčič (semifinals)
2. (Brazil) Rogério Dutra da Silva (quarterfinals)
3. (Chile) Paul Capdeville (final, retired)
4. (Croatia) Antonio Veić (champion)
5. (Brazil) Thiago Alves (quarterfinals)
6. (Australia) James Duckworth (quarterfinals)
7. (Serbia) Nikola Ćirić (first round)
8. (Portugal) Gastão Elias (quarterfinals)

== Draw ==
=== Key ===
- Q = Qualifier
- WC = Wild card
- LL = Lucky loser
- Alt = Alternate
- SE = Special exempt
- PR = Protected ranking
- ITF = ITF entry
- JE = Junior exempt
- w/o = Walkover
- r = Retired
- d = Defaulted
- SR = Special ranking

=== Finals ===
Semifinals
1	(Slovenia) Blaž Kavčič	5	6	2
4	(Croatia) Antonio Veić	7	4	6
3	(Chile) Paul Capdeville	2	6	6
Q	(Italy) Alberto Brizzi	6	3	4

Final
4	(Croatia) Antonio Veić	3	6	5
3	(Chile) Paul Capdeville	6	4	2^{r}

=== Top half ===
First round
1	(Slovenia) B Kavčič	6	6
(Italy) D Giorgini	2	4
(Croatia) T Androić	2	2
WC	(Brazil) T Monteiro	6	6
(Bosnia and Herzegovina) D Džumhur	4	6	6
(Brazil) A Ghem	6	4	4
(Argentina) G Andreozzi	4	4
5	(Brazil) T Alves	6	6
4	(Croatia) A Veić	6	6
WC	(Brazil) B Sant'anna	4	3
(Italy) M Crugnola	6	6
Q	(Croatia) D Marcan	2	2
WC	(Brazil) T Fernandes	7^{7}	3	5
(Brazil) L Kirche	6^{3}	6	7
(Argentina) P Galdón	6^{9}	4
6	(Australia) J Duckworth	7^{11}	6

Second round
1	(Slovenia) B Kavčič	6	6
WC	(Brazil) T Monteiro	1	4
(Bosnia and Herzegovina) D Džumhur	4	2
5	(Brazil) T Alves	6	6
4	(Croatia) A Veić	6
(Italy) M Crugnola	1^{r}
(Brazil) L Kirche	7^{7}	5	5
6	(Australia) J Duckworth	6^{5}	7	7

Quarterfinals
1	(Slovenia) B Kavčič	6	6
5	(Brazil) T Alves	4	2
4	(Croatia) A Veić	6	6
6	(Australia) J Duckworth	2	2

Semifinals
1	(Slovenia) B Kavčič	5	6	2
4	(Croatia) A Veić	7	4	6

=== Bottom half ===
First round
8	(Portugal) G Elias	6	6
Q	(Poland) G Panfil	3	1
(Australia) M Reid	7	2	6
Q	(Brazil) Tiago Lopes	5	6	3
(Brazil) G Clezar	2	3
(Czech Republic) I Minář	6	6
(Uruguay) M Felder	3	6	4
3	(Chile) P Capdeville	6	3	6
7	(Serbia) N Ćirić	4	1
Q	(Italy) A Brizzi	6	6
(Poland) M Gawron	6	6
(Austria) G Melzer	3	2
WC	(Brazil) Bruno Volkmann	6^{6}	2
(Brazil) R Hocevar	7^{8}	6
(Italy) Enrico Burzi	6	6^{4}	1
2	(Brazil) R Dutra da Silva	4	7^{7}	6

Second round
8	(Portugal) G Elias	6	7^{7}
(Australia) M Reid	1	6^{1}
(Czech Republic) I Minář	6	2	3
3	(Chile) P Capdeville	3	6	6
Q	(Italy) A Brizzi	6	6
(Poland) M Gawron	0	1
(Brazil) R Hocevar	6	0	2
2	(Brazil) R Dutra da Silva	3	6	6

Quarterfinals
8	(Portugal) G Elias	0	1
3	(Chile) P Capdeville	6	6
Q	(Italy) A Brizzi	3	6	6
2	(Brazil) R Dutra da Silva	6	3	4

Semifinals
3	(Chile) P Capdeville	2	6	6
Q	(Italy) A Brizzi	6	3	4
