= 2009 Aberto Santa Catarina de Tenis – Singles =

Singles
- 2009 Aberto Santa Catarina de Tenis

Final
- Champion: (Brazil) Marcelo Demoliner
- Runner-up: (Brazil) Rogério Dutra da Silva
- Score: 6–1, 6–0

Events
Singles	Doubles
← 2008 ·	Aberto Santa Catarina de Tenis	· 2010 →

Marcelo Demoliner became the first champion of this tournament. He defeated Rogério Dutra da Silva in the final (6–1, 6–0).

== Seeds ==
1. (Argentina) Sebastián Decoud (second round)
2. (Brazil) João Souza (second round)
3. (Brazil) André Miele (second round)
4. (Brazil) Rogério Dutra da Silva (final)
5. (Argentina) Juan-Pablo Amado (second round)
6. (Uruguay) Marcel Felder (quarterfinals)
7. (Brazil) Eric Gomes (semifinals)
8. (Brazil) Júlio Silva (quarterfinals)

== Draw ==
=== Key ===
- Q = Qualifier
- WC = Wild card
- LL = Lucky loser
- Alt = Alternate
- SE = Special exempt
- PR = Protected ranking
- ITF = ITF entry
- JE = Junior exempt
- w/o = Walkover
- r = Retired
- d = Defaulted
- SR = Special ranking

=== Final four ===
Semifinals
(Portugal) Leonardo Tavares	4	6	6^{4}
4	(Brazil) Rogério Dutra da Silva	6	2	7
7	(Brazil) Eric Gomes	2	3
(Brazil) Marcelo Demoliner	6	6

Final
4	(Brazil) Rogério Dutra da Silva	1	0
(Brazil) Marcelo Demoliner	6	6

=== Top half ===
First round
1	(Argentina) S Decoud	7	6
(Germany) G Kretschmer	6^{0}	4
WC	(Brazil) J Pereira	6	1	4
(Portugal) L Tavares	3	6	6
Q	(Brazil) R Camilo	4	6	6
Q	(Chile) C Saavedra-Corvalán	6	3	3
(Italy) F Torresi	3	1
8	(Brazil) J Silva	6	6
4	(Brazil) R Dutra da Silva	7	6
(Brazil) R Guidolin	5	4
(Argentina) G Tur	3	3
(Brazil) A Bonatto	6	6
(Ecuador) JC Campozano	7	6
(Brazil) T Lopes	6^{8}	1
(United States) E Nunez	7	2	1^{r}
6	(Uruguay) M Felder	6^{5}	6	1

Second round
1	(Argentina) S Decoud	3	2
(Portugal) L Tavares	6	6
Q	(Brazil) R Camilo	1	1
8	(Brazil) J Silva	6	6
4	(Brazil) R Dutra da Silva	7	6
(Brazil) A Bonatto	5	3
(Ecuador) JC Campozano	6^{7}	5
6	(Uruguay) M Felder	7	7

Quarterfinals
(Portugal) L Tavares	7	6
8	(Brazil) J Silva	5	3
4	(Brazil) R Dutra da Silva	6	7
6	(Uruguay) M Felder	4	5

Semifinals
(Portugal) L Tavares	4	6	6^{4}
4	(Brazil) R Dutra da Silva	6	2	7

=== Bottom half ===
First round
7	(Brazil) E Gomes	6	7
WC	(Brazil) F Neis	4	6^{5}
(Argentina) A Kon	1	7	4
(France) J Eysseric	6	6^{4}	6
(Brazil) E Ribeiro Neto	4	6	4
(Serbia) D Savić	6	0	6
(Germany) A Begemann	2	4
3	(Brazil) A Miele	6	6
5	(Argentina) J-P Amado	6	6
WC	(Brazil) B Volkmann	1	1
WC	(Brazil) A Baran	1	0
Q	(Brazil) D Silva	6	6
(Brazil) M Demoliner	6	6
Q	(Brazil) T Turini	2	2
(Colombia) M Quintero	4	6	3
2	(Brazil) J Souza	6	3	6

Second round
7	(Brazil) E Gomes	6	5	6
(France) J Eysseric	0	7	1
(Serbia) D Savić	1	6	6
3	(Brazil) A Miele	6	0	1
5	(Argentina) J-P Amado	6	0	3
Q	(Brazil) D Silva	3	6	6
(Brazil) M Demoliner	5	6	6
2	(Brazil) J Souza	7	2	3

Quarterfinals
7	(Brazil) E Gomes	7	4	6
(Serbia) D Savić	5	6	2
Q	(Brazil) D Silva	3	6	4
(Brazil) M Demoliner	6	4	6

Semifinals
7	(Brazil) E Gomes	2	3
(Brazil) M Demoliner	6	6
