= 2011 Aberto Santa Catarina de Tenis – Doubles =

Doubles
- 2011 Aberto Santa Catarina de Tenis

Final
- Champions: (Brazil) Franco Ferreiro (Brazil) André Sá
- Runners-up: (Spain) Adrián Menéndez (Portugal) Leonardo Tavares
- Score: 6–2, 3–6, [10–4]

Events
Singles	Doubles
← 2010 ·	Aberto Santa Catarina de Tenis	· 2012 →

Franco Ferreiro and André Sá defended their last year's title, defeating Adrián Menéndez and Leonardo Tavares 6–2, 3–6, [10–4] in the final.

== Seeds ==
1. (Brazil) Franco Ferreiro / (Brazil) André Sá (champions)
2. (Spain) Adrián Menéndez / (Portugal) Leonardo Tavares (final)
3. (Brazil) Thiago Alves / (Brazil) Júlio Silva (semifinals)
4. (Argentina) Facundo Bagnis / (Argentina) Andrés Molteni (first round)

== Draw ==
=== Key ===
- Q = Qualifier
- WC = Wild card
- LL = Lucky loser
- Alt = Alternate
- ITF = ITF entry
- PR = Protected ranking
- SR = Special ranking
- SE = Special exempt
- JE = Junior exempt
- JR = Junior Accelerator Programme entrant
- CO = College Accelerator Programme entrant
- NG = Next Gen Accelerator Program entrant
- w/o = Walkover
- r = Retired
- d = Defaulted

=== Draw ===
First round
1	(Brazil) F Ferreiro (Brazil) A Sá	6	6
WC	(Brazil) Eduardo Dischinger (Brazil) Bruno Volkmann	0	1
(Argentina) P Galdón (Brazil) C Zampieri	7	6
(Brazil) R Hocevar (Brazil) F Romboli	6^{5}	1
3	(Brazil) T Alves (Brazil) J Silva	7	6
(Ecuador) G Lapentti (Chile) N Massú	6^{4}	4
WC	(Brazil) K Sell (Brazil) Thales Turini	6	6
(Finland) T Nieminen (Finland) J Paukku	2	1
(Sweden) Christian Lindell (Brazil) J Souza	6	6
WC	(Brazil) M Demoliner (Brazil) A Ghem	4	4
(Argentina) J Acasuso (Argentina) S Prieto	3	6	[10]
4	(Argentina) F Bagnis (Argentina) A Molteni	6	4	[8]
(Argentina) JP Brzezicki (Italy) R Ghedin	6^{3}	6^{5}
(Slovenia) A Bedene (Russia) I Belyaev	7	7
Alt	(Spain) Oscar Burrieza (Spain) Javier Martí	6	5	[5]
2	(Spain) A Menéndez (Portugal) L Tavares	1	7	[10]

Quarterfinals
1	(Brazil) F Ferreiro (Brazil) A Sá	6	6^{3}	[10]
(Argentina) P Galdón (Brazil) C Zampieri	3	7	[5]
3	(Brazil) T Alves (Brazil) J Silva	6	6
WC	(Brazil) K Sell (Brazil) T Turini	1	3
(Sweden) Christian Lindell (Brazil) J Souza
(Argentina) J Acasuso (Argentina) S Prieto	w/o
(Slovenia) A Bedene (Russia) I Belyaev	1	4
2	(Spain) A Menéndez (Portugal) L Tavares	6	6

Semifinals
1	(Brazil) F Ferreiro (Brazil) A Sá	6	7
3	(Brazil) T Alves (Brazil) J Silva	3	5
(Argentina) J Acasuso (Argentina) S Prieto
2	(Spain) A Menéndez (Portugal) L Tavares	w/o

Finals
1	(Brazil) F Ferreiro (Brazil) A Sá	6	3	[10]
2	(Spain) A Menéndez (Portugal) L Tavares	2	6	[4]
