= 2012 Aberto Santa Catarina de Tenis – Doubles =

Doubles
- 2012 Aberto Santa Catarina de Tenis

Final
- Champions: (Croatia) Marin Draganja (Croatia) Dino Marcan
- Runners-up: (Slovenia) Blaž Kavčič (Croatia) Antonio Veić
- Score: 6–2, 6–0

Events
Singles	Doubles
← 2011 ·	Aberto Santa Catarina de Tenis	· 2022 →

Franco Ferreiro and André Sá were the defending champions but decided not to participate.
Marin Draganja and Dino Marcan won the title, defeating Blaž Kavčič and Antonio Veić 6–2, 6–0 in the final.

== Seeds ==
1. (Chile) Paul Capdeville / (Uruguay) Marcel Felder (semifinals)
2. (Brazil) Rodrigo Grilli / (Brazil) André Miele (semifinals)
3. (Croatia) Marin Draganja / (Croatia) Dino Marcan (champions)
4. (Slovenia) Blaž Kavčič / (Croatia) Antonio Veić (final)

== Draw ==
=== Key ===
- Q = Qualifier
- WC = Wild card
- LL = Lucky loser
- Alt = Alternate
- SE = Special exempt
- PR = Protected ranking
- ITF = ITF entry
- JE = Junior exempt
- w/o = Walkover
- r = Retired
- d = Defaulted
- SR = Special ranking

=== Draw ===
First round
1	(Chile) P Capdeville (Uruguay) M Felder	6	6
WC	(Brazil) T Fernandes (Brazil) B Sant'anna	4	1
(Brazil) R Hocevar (Portugal) L Tavares	5	4
(Italy) Enrico Burzi (Italy) D Giorgini	7	6
3	(Croatia) M Draganja (Croatia) D Marcan	6	6
Alt	(Italy) A Brizzi (Italy) M Crugnola	0	1
(Poland) M Gawron (Poland) A Kapaś	5	4
(Argentina) G Andreozzi (Argentina) P Galdón	7	6
WC	(Brazil) C Lindell (Brazil) Tiago Lopes	0	6	[11]
WC	(Brazil) L Kirche (Brazil) T Monteiro	6	2	[9]
(Brazil) R Dutra da Silva (Brazil) J Pereira	6	3	[6]
4	(Slovenia) B Kavčič (Croatia) A Veić	3	6	[10]
(Croatia) T Androić (Austria) G Melzer	7^{7}	2	[10]
(Brazil) G Clezar (Brazil) A Ghem	6^{5}	6	[3]
(Portugal) G Elias (Argentina) M González	6	3	[7]
2	(Brazil) R Grilli (Brazil) A Miele	1	6	[10]

Quarterfinals
1	(Chile) P Capdeville (Uruguay) M Felder	4	6	[10]
(Italy) Enrico Burzi (Italy) D Giorgini	6	4	[3]
3	(Croatia) M Draganja (Croatia) D Marcan	6	6
(Argentina) G Andreozzi (Argentina) P Galdón	3	1
WC	(Brazil) C Lindell (Brazil) Tiago Lopes	0	2
4	(Slovenia) B Kavčič (Croatia) A Veić	6	6
(Croatia) T Androić (Austria) G Melzer	6^{3}	1
2	(Brazil) R Grilli (Brazil) A Miele	7^{7}	6

Semifinals
1	(Chile) P Capdeville (Uruguay) M Felder	2	3
3	(Croatia) M Draganja (Croatia) D Marcan	6	6
4	(Slovenia) B Kavčič (Croatia) A Veić	6	6
2	(Brazil) R Grilli (Brazil) A Miele	1	2

Final
3	(Croatia) M Draganja (Croatia) D Marcan	6	6
4	(Slovenia) B Kavčič (Croatia) A Veić	2	0
