= 2011 Aberto Santa Catarina de Tenis – Singles =

Singles
- 2011 Aberto Santa Catarina de Tenis
- 2010 Champion: (Brazil) Marcos Daniel

Final
- Champion: (Argentina) José Acasuso
- Runner-up: (Brazil) Marcelo Demoliner
- Score: 6–2, 6–2

Events
Singles	Doubles
← 2010 ·	Aberto Santa Catarina de Tenis	· 2012 →

Marcos Daniel was the defending champion, but lost to Ricardo Hocevar 6–7^{(3–7)}, 1–6 in the first round. José Acasuso defeated Marcelo Demoliner 6–2, 6–2 in the final.

== Seeds ==
1. (Brazil) Ricardo Mello (first round)
2. (Brazil) Marcos Daniel (first round)
3. (Brazil) João Souza (first round)
4. (France) Éric Prodon (quarterfinals)
5. (Argentina) Diego Junqueira (semifinals)
6. (Argentina) Leonardo Mayer (quarterfinals)
7. (Japan) Tatsuma Ito (first round)
8. (Ecuador) Giovanni Lapentti (second round, retired)

== Draw ==
Key

- Q = Qualifier
- WC = Wild card
- LL = Lucky loser
- Alt = Alternate
- ITF = ITF entry
- PR = Protected ranking
- SR = Special ranking
- SE = Special exempt
- JE = Junior exempt
- JR = Junior Accelerator Programme entrant
- CO = College Accelerator Programme entrant
- NG = Next Gen Accelerator Program entrant
- w/o = Walkover
- r = Retired
- d = Defaulted

=== Finals ===
Semifinals
(Argentina) José Acasuso	7	4	6
5	(Argentina) Diego Junqueira	6^{4}	6	0
WC	(Brazil) Marcelo Demoliner	6	6
Q	(Slovenia) Aljaž Bedene	2	3

Final
(Argentina) José Acasuso	6	6
WC	(Brazil) Marcelo Demoliner	2	2

=== Top half ===
First round
1	(Brazil) R Mello	3	6	3
Q	(Argentina) M Alund	6	4	6
(Argentina) A Molteni	1	3
(Argentina) J Acasuso	6	6
(Argentina) S Decoud	5	1
(Brazil) J Silva	7	6
SE	(Brazil) T Fernandes	4	2
6	(Argentina) L Mayer	6	6
4	(France) É Prodon	2	6	6
(Brazil) C Zampieri	6	4	2
(Chile) N Massú	0	4
(Argentina) P Galdón	6	6
Q	(Argentina) M Vassallo Argüello	6	7
Q	(Brazil) A Ghem	0	5
(Brazil) T Alves	3	1
5	(Argentina) D Junqueira	6	6

Second round
Q	(Argentina) M Alund	3	4
(Argentina) J Acasuso	6	6
(Brazil) J Silva	7	4	3
6	(Argentina) L Mayer	6^{4}	6	6
4	(France) É Prodon	6	3	6
(Argentina) P Galdón	1	6	1
Q	(Argentina) M Vassallo Argüello	2	3
5	(Argentina) D Junqueira	6	6

Quarterfinals
(Argentina) J Acasuso	6	6
6	(Argentina) L Mayer	3	4
4	(France) É Prodon	3	6	6^{4}
5	(Argentina) D Junqueira	6	4	7

Semifinals
(Argentina) J Acasuso	7	4	6
5	(Argentina) D Junqueira	6^{4}	6	0

=== Bottom half ===
First round
7	(Japan) T Ito	2	6	4
WC	(Brazil) M Demoliner	6	4	6
(Brazil) F Romboli	6	6
WC	(Brazil) Bruno Volkmann	4	2
(Italy) R Ghedin	7	6
(Portugal) L Tavares	5	0
(Argentina) F Bagnis	3	7	3
3	(Brazil) J Souza	6	5	1^{r}
8	(Ecuador) G Lapentti	4	6	6
WC	(Brazil) Thales Turini	6	3	1
Q	(Slovenia) A Bedene	6	6
(Argentina) JP Brzezicki	4	4
SE	(Spain) J Martí	6	6
WC	(Brazil) TM Monteiro	4	1
(Brazil) R Hocevar	7	6
2	(Brazil) M Daniel	6^{3}	1

Second round
WC	(Brazil) M Demoliner	6	6
(Brazil) F Romboli	1	3
(Italy) R Ghedin	2	2
(Argentina) F Bagnis	6	6
8	(Ecuador) G Lapentti	3	2^{r}
Q	(Slovenia) A Bedene	6	4
SE	(Spain) J Martí	7	6
(Brazil) R Hocevar	5	2

Quarterfinals
WC	(Brazil) M Demoliner	6	6
(Argentina) F Bagnis	4	4
Q	(Slovenia) A Bedene	6	6
SE	(Spain) J Martí	3	2

Semifinals
WC	(Brazil) M Demoliner	6	6
Q	(Slovenia) A Bedene	2	3
