= 2012 Peugeot Tennis Cup – Doubles =

Doubles
- 2012 Peugeot Tennis Cup

Final
- Champions: (Brazil) Marcelo Demoliner (Brazil) João Souza
- Runners-up: (Portugal) Frederico Gil (Portugal) Pedro Sousa
- Score: 6–2, 6–4

Events
Singles	Doubles
← 2011 ·	Peugeot Tennis Cup	· 2013 →

Marcelo Demoliner and João Souza won the title by defeating Frederico Gil and Pedro Sousa 6–2, 6–4 in the final.

== Seeds ==
1. (United States) Nicholas Monroe / (Germany) Simon Stadler (quarterfinals)
2. (Colombia) Juan Sebastián Cabal / (Spain) Rubén Ramírez Hidalgo (quarterfinals)
3. (Australia) John Peers / (Australia) John-Patrick Smith (semifinals)
4. (Brazil) Marcelo Demoliner / (Brazil) João Souza (champions)

== Draw ==
=== Key ===
- Q = Qualifier
- WC = Wild card
- LL = Lucky loser
- Alt = Alternate
- SE = Special exempt
- PR = Protected ranking
- ITF = ITF entry
- JE = Junior exempt
- w/o = Walkover
- r = Retired
- d = Defaulted
- SR = Special ranking

=== Draw ===
First round
1	(United States) N Monroe (Germany) S Stadler	4	6	[10]
(Brazil) G Clezar (Brazil) A Ghem	6	4	[8]
(Portugal) F Gil (Portugal) P Sousa	3	7^{7}	[10]
PR	(Croatia) F Škugor (Croatia) A Veić	6	6^{2}	[7]
3	(Australia) J Peers (Australia) J-P Smith	6	6^{4}	[10]
(Brazil) T Alves (Brazil) Fabiano de Paula	0	7^{7}	[8]
(Germany) S Greul (Italy) A Motti	6^{4}	5
(Argentina) G Pella (Germany) A Satschko	7^{7}	7
WC	(Serbia) M Djokovic (Spain) Carlos Gómez-Herrera	7^{7}	6
(Netherlands) T Schoorel (Romania) A Ungur	6^{4}	4
(Slovakia) P Červenák (United States) W Odesnik	7	5	[8]
4	(Brazil) M Demoliner (Brazil) J Souza	5	7	[10]
(Portugal) G Elias (Portugal) J Sousa	6	2	[10]
WC	(Brazil) R Mello (Brazil) J Silva	2	6	[7]
WC	(Brazil) A Laranja (Sweden) C Lindell	6^{4}	1
2	(Colombia) JS Cabal (Spain) R Ramírez Hidalgo	7^{7}	6

Quarterfinals
1	(United States) N Monroe (Germany) S Stadler	6	3	[5]
(Portugal) F Gil (Portugal) P Sousa	1	6	[10]
3	(Australia) J Peers (Australia) J-P Smith	6	7
(Argentina) G Pella (Germany) A Satschko	3	5
WC	(Serbia) M Djokovic (Spain) C Gómez-Herrera	4	1
4	(Brazil) M Demoliner (Brazil) J Souza	6	6
(Portugal) G Elias (Portugal) J Sousa	6^{8}	6	[16]
2	(Colombia) JS Cabal (Spain) R Ramírez Hidalgo	7^{10}	4	[14]

Semifinals
(Portugal) F Gil (Portugal) P Sousa	6	6
3	(Australia) J Peers (Australia) J-P Smith	4	4
4	(Brazil) M Demoliner (Brazil) J Souza	7^{7}	6
(Portugal) G Elias (Portugal) J Sousa	6^{4}	4

Final
(Portugal) F Gil (Portugal) P Sousa	2	4
4	(Brazil) M Demoliner (Brazil) J Souza	6	6
