= 2013 Peugeot Tennis Cup – Singles =

Singles
- 2013 Peugeot Tennis Cup

Final
- Champion: (Argentina) Agustín Velotti
- Runner-up: (Slovenia) Blaž Rola
- Score: 6-3, 6-4

Events
Singles	Doubles
← 2012 ·	Peugeot Tennis Cup	· 2014 →

Gastão Elias was the defending champion, but decide not to participate this edition. Agustín Velotti won in the final against Blaž Rola 6–3, 6–4.

== Seeds ==
1. (Netherlands) Thiemo de Bakker (second round)
2. (Brazil) João Souza (first round)
3. (Argentina) Diego Schwartzman (second round)
4. (Colombia) Alejandro González (second round)
5. (Chile) Paul Capdeville (first round)
6. (Argentina) Guido Andreozzi (second round)
7. (Brazil) André Ghem (first round)
8. (Brazil) Guilherme Clezar (quarterfinals)

== Draw ==
=== Key ===
- Q = Qualifier
- WC = Wild card
- LL = Lucky loser
- Alt = Alternate
- SE = Special exempt
- PR = Protected ranking
- ITF = ITF entry
- JE = Junior exempt
- w/o = Walkover
- r = Retired
- d = Defaulted
- SR = Special ranking

=== Finals ===
Semifinals
WC	(Ecuador) Emilio Gómez	0	4
(Slovenia) Blaž Rola	6	6
(Argentina) Agustín Velotti	6	6
SE	(Argentina) Eduardo Schwank	2	2

Final
(Slovenia) Blaž Rola	3	4
(Argentina) Agustín Velotti	6	6

=== Top half ===
First round
1	(Netherlands) T de Bakker	6	6
(El Salvador) M Arévalo	4	2
(Ecuador) JC Campozano	6	4	3
WC	(Ecuador) E Gómez	2	6	6
(Brazil) B Sant'Anna	3	4
(Colombia) N Barrientos	6	6
(Argentina) A Molteni	1	2
8	(Brazil) G Clezar	6	6
3	(Argentina) D Schwartzman	2	7^{7}	6
Q	(Argentina) JI Londero	6	6^{1}	1
WC	(Brazil) Carlos E. Severino	7^{7}	3	0
(Slovenia) B Rola	6^{4}	6	6
(Brazil) F de Paula	6	4	5
(Brazil) L Kirche	2	6	7
WC	(Sweden) C Lindell	4	4
6	(Argentina) G Andreozzi	6	6

Second round
1	(Netherlands) T de Bakker	6^{5}	6	6^{3}
WC	(Ecuador) E Gómez	7^{7}	4	7^{7}
(Colombia) N Barrientos	4	1
8	(Brazil) G Clezar	6	6
3	(Argentina) D Schwartzman	2	4
(Slovenia) B Rola	6	6
(Brazil) L Kirche	7^{7}	6
6	(Argentina) G Andreozzi	6^{1}	2

Quarterfinals
WC	(Ecuador) E Gómez	7^{9}	6
8	(Brazil) G Clezar	6^{7}	4
(Slovenia) B Rola	6	6
(Brazil) L Kirche	3	4

Semifinals
WC	(Ecuador) E Gómez	0	4
(Slovenia) B Rola	6	6

=== Bottom half ===
First round
7	(Brazil) A Ghem	1	4
Q	(Chile) Bastián Malla	6	6
(Brazil) Tiago Lopes	6	6
(Argentina) Leandro Migani	1	3
(Brazil) R Hocevar	7^{7}	3	1
(Argentina) A Velotti	6^{4}	6	6
Q	(Brazil) T Fernandes	2	5
4	(Colombia) A González	6	7
5	(Chile) P Capdeville	0	1
(Argentina) M Trungelliti	6	6
Q	(Chile) C Garin	6	6
(Brazil) M Demoliner	3	4
WC	(Brazil) Wilson Leite	6	6
(Chile) G Lama	4	2
SE	(Argentina) E Schwank	6	7
2	(Brazil) J Souza	3	5

Second round
Q	(Chile) B Malla	6	7
(Brazil) T Lopes	1	5
(Argentina) A Velotti	6	3	6
4	(Colombia) A González	4	6	1
(Argentina) M Trungelliti	4	7^{7}	4
Q	(Chile) C Garin	6	6^{2}	6
WC	(Brazil) Wilson Leite	3	3
SE	(Argentina) E Schwank	6	6

Quarterfinals
Q	(Chile) B Malla	1	0
(Argentina) A Velotti	6	6
Q	(Chile) C Garin	5	5
SE	(Argentina) E Schwank	7	7

Semifinals
(Argentina) A Velotti	6	6
SE	(Argentina) E Schwank	2	2
