= 2009 Aberto Santa Catarina de Tenis =

- Date: May 11–17
- Edition: 1st
- Location: Blumenau, Brazil

Champions

Singles
- (Brazil) Marcelo Demoliner

Doubles
- (Brazil) Marcelo Demoliner / (Brazil) Rodrigo Guidolin
Aberto Santa Catarina de Tenis	· 2010 →

The 2009 Aberto Santa Catarina de Tenis was a professional tennis tournament played on outdoor red clay courts. It was part of the 2009 ATP Challenger Tour. It took place in Blumenau, Brazil between 11 and 17 May 2009.

== ATP entrants ==
=== Seeds ===
Nationality	Player	Ranking*	Seeding
ARG	Sebastián Decoud	157	1
BRA	João Souza	224	2
BRA	André Miele	255	3
BRA	Rogério Dutra da Silva	260	4
ARG	Juan-Pablo Amado	263	5
URU	Marcel Felder	268	6
BRA	Eric Gomes	299	7
BRA	Júlio Silva	314	8

- Rankings are as of April 5, 2009.

=== Other entrants ===
The following players received wildcards into the singles main draw:

- (Brazil) André Baran
- (Brazil) Fabrício Neis
- (Brazil) José Pereira
- (Brazil) Bruno Wolkmann

The following players received entry from the qualifying draw:

- (Brazil) Rafael Camilo
- (Chile) Cristóbal Saavedra Corvalán
- (Brazil) Daniel Silva
- (Brazil) Thales Turini

== Champions ==
=== Men's singles ===
(Brazil) Marcelo Demoliner def. (Brazil) Rogério Dutra da Silva, 6–1, 6–0

=== Men's doubles ===
(Brazil) Marcelo Demoliner / (Brazil) Rodrigo Guidolin def. (Brazil) Rogério Dutra da Silva / (Brazil) Júlio Silva, 7–5, 4–6, [13–11]
