= 2012 Peugeot Tennis Cup – Singles =

Singles
- 2012 Peugeot Tennis Cup

Final
- Champion: (Portugal) Gastão Elias
- Runner-up: (Serbia) Boris Pašanski
- Score: 6–3, 7–5

Events
Singles	Doubles
← 2011 ·	Peugeot Tennis Cup	· 2013 →

Gastão Elias won the title, defeating Boris Pašanski 6–3, 7–5 in the final.

== Seeds ==
1. (Spain) Rubén Ramírez Hidalgo (first round)
2. (Portugal) João Sousa (semifinals)
3. (Romania) Adrian Ungur (second round)
4. (Argentina) Guido Pella (semifinals)
5. (Brazil) Thiago Alves (second round)
6. (Brazil) João Souza (second round)
7. (United States) Wayne Odesnik (first round)
8. (Portugal) Frederico Gil (second round)

== Draw ==
=== Key ===
- Q = Qualifier
- WC = Wild card
- LL = Lucky loser
- Alt = Alternate
- SE = Special exempt
- PR = Protected ranking
- ITF = ITF entry
- JE = Junior exempt
- w/o = Walkover
- r = Retired
- d = Defaulted
- SR = Special ranking

=== Finals ===
Semifinals
(Serbia) Boris Pašanski	6	6
4	(Argentina) Guido Pella	2	3
(Portugal) Gastão Elias	6	7
2	(Portugal) João Sousa	4	5

Final
(Serbia) Boris Pašanski	3	5
(Portugal) Gastão Elias	6	7

=== Top half ===
First round
1	(Spain) R Ramírez Hidalgo	5	6	2
(Croatia) A Veić	7	3	6
Q	(Brazil) J Pereira	6	6
(Chile) J Aguilar	4	3
(Serbia) B Pašanski	5	6	6
WC	(Brazil) T Monteiro	7	2	3
(Croatia) N Mektić	0	6	6
7	(United States) W Odesnik	6	4	4
4	(Argentina) G Pella	7^{8}	6
(Portugal) P Sousa	6^{6}	3
WC	(Brazil) R Hocevar	6	6
(Brazil) J Silva	2	3
WC	(Brazil) Fabiano de Paula	7^{7}	2	4
(Brazil) R Mello	6^{5}	6	6
(Australia) J-P Smith	3	2
6	(Brazil) J Souza	6	6

Second round
(Croatia) A Veić	6	6
Q	(Brazil) J Pereira	2	0
(Serbia) B Pašanski	6^{1}	7	6
(Croatia) N Mektić	7^{7}	5	3
4	(Argentina) G Pella	3	6	6
WC	(Brazil) R Hocevar	6	3	3
(Brazil) R Mello	4	7^{7}	6
6	(Brazil) J Souza	6	6^{4}	3

Quarterfinals
(Croatia) A Veić	5	1
(Serbia) B Pašanski	7	6
4	(Argentina) G Pella	6	6
(Brazil) R Mello	2	3

Semifinals
(Serbia) B Pašanski	6	6
4	(Argentina) G Pella	2	3

=== Bottom half ===
First round
8	(Portugal) F Gil	6	6
(Slovakia) P Červenák	3	1
(Germany) S Greul	6	2	0
(Portugal) G Elias	3	6	6
Q	(Colombia) JS Cabal	3	3
Q	(Brazil) A Ghem	6	6
Q	(Serbia) M Djokovic	6^{3}	1
3	(Romania) A Ungur	7^{7}	6
5	(Brazil) T Alves	6	6
(Netherlands) T Schoorel	1	1
(Netherlands) T de Bakker	6	7
PR	(Germany) J Reister	1	5
(Brazil) L Kirche	6	3	5
(Brazil) G Clezar	3	6	7
WC	(Brazil) Tiago Lopes	3	2
2	(Portugal) J Sousa	6	6

Second round
8	(Portugal) F Gil	6	2	2
(Portugal) G Elias	3	6	6
Q	(Brazil) A Ghem	6	6
3	(Romania) A Ungur	2	3
5	(Brazil) T Alves	6	3	6^{5}
(Netherlands) T de Bakker	3	6	7^{7}
(Brazil) G Clezar	0	2
2	(Portugal) J Sousa	6	6

Quarterfinals
(Portugal) G Elias	4	7	6
Q	(Brazil) A Ghem	6	5	1
(Netherlands) T de Bakker	5	6	6^{4}
2	(Portugal) J Sousa	7	3	7^{7}

Semifinals
(Portugal) G Elias	6	7
2	(Portugal) J Sousa	4	5
