= 2010 Aberto Santa Catarina de Tenis – Doubles =

Doubles
- 2010 Aberto Santa Catarina de Tenis

Final
- Champions: (Brazil) Franco Ferreiro (Brazil) André Sá
- Runners-up: (Brazil) André Ghem (Italy) Simone Vagnozzi
- Score: 6–4, 6–3

Events
Singles	Doubles
- Aberto Santa Catarina de Tenis

Marcelo Demoliner and Rodrigo Guidolin were the defenders of championship title, but they lost to Ricardo Hocevar and Caio Zampieri in the first round.
Franco Ferreiro and André Sá were champions after beating André Ghem and Simone Vagnozzi in two sets (6–4, 6–3).

== Seeds ==
1. (Brazil) Franco Ferreiro / (Brazil) André Sá (champions)
2. (Brazil) Marcelo Demoliner / (Brazil) Rodrigo Guidolin (first round)
3. (Brazil) Rogério Dutra da Silva / (Brazil) Júlio Silva (first round)
4. (Spain) Carles Poch Gradin / (Spain) Gabriel Trujillo Soler (quarterfinals)

== Draw ==
Key

- Q = Qualifier
- WC = Wild card
- LL = Lucky loser
- Alt = Alternate
- ITF = ITF entry
- PR = Protected ranking
- SR = Special ranking
- SE = Special exempt
- JE = Junior exempt
- JR = Junior Accelerator Programme entrant
- CO = College Accelerator Programme entrant
- NG = Next Gen Accelerator Program entrant
- w/o = Walkover
- r = Retired
- d = Defaulted

=== Draw ===
First round
1	(Brazil) F Ferreiro (Brazil) A Sá
(Argentina) C Berlocq (Argentina) D Junqueira	w/o
(Argentina) JP Brzezicki (Argentina) A Molteni	6	3	[10]
WC	(Brazil) M Daniel (Brazil) T Fernandes	3	6	[7]
4	(Spain) C Poch-Gradin (Spain) G Trujillo Soler	7	6
(Uruguay) M Felder (Brazil) R Grilli	5	4
(Spain) G Alcaide (Spain) G Olaso	6	7
(Slovenia) A Bedene (Slovenia) B Kavčič	0	6^{5}
(Austria) A Haider-Maurer (Germany) B Knittel	6^{10}	3
(Brazil) T Alves (Brazil) R Mello	7	6
(Brazil) A Ghem (Italy) S Vagnozzi	6	6
3	(Brazil) R Dutra da Silva (Brazil) J Silva	1	1
WC	(Brazil) G Clezar (Brazil) B Semenzato	1	5
WC	(Brazil) T Lopes (Brazil) A Miele	6	7
(Brazil) R Hocevar (Brazil) C Zampieri	4	7	[10]
2	(Brazil) M Demoliner (Brazil) R Guidolin	6	6^{5}	[7]

Quarterfinals
1	(Brazil) F Ferreiro (Brazil) A Sá
(Argentina) JP Brzezicki (Argentina) A Molteni	w/o
4	(Spain) C Poch-Gradin (Spain) G Trujillo Soler	6	6
(Spain) G Alcaide (Spain) G Olaso	4	4
(Brazil) T Alves (Brazil) R Mello	2	2
(Brazil) A Ghem (Italy) S Vagnozzi	6	6
WC	(Brazil) T Lopes (Brazil) A Miele	2	4
(Brazil) R Hocevar (Brazil) C Zampieri	6	6

Semifinals
1	(Brazil) F Ferreiro (Brazil) A Sá	6	6
4	(Spain) C Poch-Gradin (Spain) G Trujillo Soler	3	3
(Brazil) A Ghem (Italy) S Vagnozzi	3	6	[10]
(Brazil) R Hocevar (Brazil) C Zampieri	6	3	[8]

Finals
1	(Brazil) F Ferreiro (Brazil) A Sá	6	6
(Brazil) A Ghem (Italy) S Vagnozzi	4	3
