= 2010 Aberto Santa Catarina de Tenis – Singles =

Singles
- 2010 Aberto Santa Catarina de Tenis

Final
- Champion: (Brazil) Marcos Daniel
- Runner-up: (Germany) Bastian Knittel
- Score: 7–5, 6–7(5), 6–4

Events
Singles	Doubles
- Aberto Santa Catarina de Tenis

Marcelo Demoliner was the defending champion, but he lost against Ricardo Mello in the first round.
Marcos Daniel won in the final 7–5, 6–7(5), 6–4 against Bastian Knittel.

== Seeds ==
1. (Chile) Nicolás Massú (quarterfinals)
2. (Slovenia) Blaž Kavčič (second round)
3. (Brazil) Ricardo Mello (second round)
4. (Brazil) Marcos Daniel (champion)
5. (Brazil) Thiago Alves (second round)
6. (Brazil) Júlio Silva (semifinals)
7. (Argentina) Juan Pablo Brzezicki (second round)
8. (Argentina) Diego Junqueira (semifinals)

== Draw ==
Key

- Q = Qualifier
- WC = Wild card
- LL = Lucky loser
- Alt = Alternate
- ITF = ITF entry
- PR = Protected ranking
- SR = Special ranking
- SE = Special exempt
- JE = Junior exempt
- JR = Junior Accelerator Programme entrant
- CO = College Accelerator Programme entrant
- NG = Next Gen Accelerator Program entrant
- w/o = Walkover
- r = Retired
- d = Defaulted

=== Finals ===
Semifinals
8	(Argentina) Diego Junqueira	7	4	4
(Germany) Bastian Knittel	5	6	6
4	(Brazil) Marcos Daniel	6	6
6	(Brazil) Júlio Silva	4	3

Final
(Germany) Bastian Knittel	5	7	4
4	(Brazil) Marcos Daniel	7	6^{5}	6

=== Top half ===
First round
1	(Chile) N Massú	6	7
(Spain) C Poch-Gradin	4	5
WC	(Brazil) G Clezar	3	2
WC	(Brazil) R Guidolin	6	6
(Brazil) R Dutra da Silva	6	7
Q	(Brazil) A Miele	1	5
(Brazil) R Hocevar	4	2
8	(Argentina) D Junqueira	6	6
3	(Brazil) R Mello	6	6
(Brazil) M Demoliner	4	2
(Brazil) A Ghem	5	1
(Argentina) C Berlocq	7	6
Q	(Brazil) L Kirche	6	2	4
(Germany) B Knittel	3	6	6
(Italy) S Vagnozzi	2	6	1
7	(Argentina) JP Brzezicki	6	0	6

Second round
1	(Chile) N Massú	7	6
WC	(Brazil) R Guidolin	5	4
(Brazil) R Dutra da Silva	5	7	4
8	(Argentina) D Junqueira	7	6^{2}	6
3	(Brazil) R Mello	3	4
(Argentina) C Berlocq	6	6
(Germany) B Knittel	4	6	6
7	(Argentina) JP Brzezicki	6	0	2

Quarterfinals
1	(Chile) N Massú	6^{5}	2
8	(Argentina) D Junqueira	7	6
(Argentina) C Berlocq	4	4
(Germany) B Knittel	6	6

Semifinals
8	(Argentina) D Junqueira	7	4	4
(Germany) B Knittel	5	6	6

=== Bottom half ===
First round
5	(Brazil) T Alves	6	6
(Brazil) C Zampieri	3	4
(Uruguay) M Felder	6	2	1
(Morocco) R El Amrani	4	6	6
(Spain) G Trujillo Soler	6	6
WC	(Brazil) T Fernandes	2	3
(Austria) A Haider-Maurer	4	4
4	(Brazil) M Daniel	6	6
6	(Brazil) J Silva	6	6
Q	(Brazil) T Lopes	2	2
WC	(Brazil) B Wolkmann	2	4
(Slovenia) A Bedene	6	6
(Spain) G Alcaide	6	6
(Spain) G Olaso	1	3
Q	(Peru) I Miranda	7	3	5
2	(Slovenia) B Kavčič	6^{1}	6	6

Second round
5	(Brazil) T Alves	4	2
(Morocco) R El Amrani	6	6
(Spain) G Trujillo Soler	6	0	4
4	(Brazil) M Daniel	3	6	6
6	(Brazil) J Silva	7	6
(Slovenia) A Bedene	6^{2}	4
(Spain) G Alcaide	6	6
2	(Slovenia) B Kavčič	1	0

Quarterfinals
(Morocco) R El Amrani	5	6	1
4	(Brazil) M Daniel	7	2	6
6	(Brazil) J Silva	1	6	6
(Spain) G Alcaide	6	3	1

Semifinals
4	(Brazil) M Daniel	6	6
6	(Brazil) J Silva	4	3
