= 2012 Aberto Santa Catarina de Tenis =

- Date: 9–15 April
- Edition: 7th
- Surface: Clay
- Location: Blumenau, Brazil

Champions

Singles
- (Croatia) Antonio Veić

Doubles
- (Croatia) Marin Draganja / (Croatia) Dino Marcan
← 2011 ·	Aberto Santa Catarina de Tenis	· 2022 →

The 2012 Aberto Santa Catarina de Tenis was a professional tennis tournament played on clay courts. It was the seventh edition of the tournament which was part of the 2012 ATP Challenger Tour. It took place in Blumenau, Brazil between 9 and 15 April 2012.

== Singles main-draw entrants ==
=== Seeds ===
Country	Player	Rank^{1}	Seed
SVN	Blaž Kavčič	109	1
BRA	Rogério Dutra da Silva	116	2
CHI	Paul Capdeville	119	3
CRO	Antonio Veić	150	4
BRA	Thiago Alves	160	5
AUS	James Duckworth	191	6
SRB	Nikola Ćirić	196	7
POR	Gastão Elias	215	8

- ^{1} Rankings are as of April 2, 2012.

=== Other entrants ===
The following players received wildcards into the singles main draw:

- (Brazil) Tiago Fernandes
- (Brazil) Thiago Monteiro
- (Brazil) Bruno Sant'anna
- (Brazil) Bruno Volkmann

The following players received entry from the qualifying draw:

- (Italy) Alberto Brizzi
- (Brazil) Tiago Lopes
- (Croatia) Dino Marcan
- (Poland) Grzegorz Panfil

== Champions ==
=== Singles ===
- (Croatia) Antonio Veić def. (Chile) Paul Capdeville, 3–6, 6–4, 5–2, retired

=== Doubles ===
- (Croatia) Marin Draganja / (Croatia) Dino Marcan def. (Slovenia) Blaž Kavčič / (Croatia) Antonio Veić, 6–2, 6–0
