= 2013 Peugeot Tennis Cup – Doubles =

Doubles
- 2013 Peugeot Tennis Cup

Final
- Champions: (Netherlands) Thiemo de Bakker (Brazil) André Sá
- Runners-up: (Brazil) Marcelo Demoliner (Brazil) João Souza
- Score: 6–3, 6–2

Events
Singles	Doubles
← 2012 ·	Peugeot Tennis Cup	· 2014 →

Marcelo Demoliner and João Souza were the defending champions but lost to Thiemo de Bakker and André Sá in the final 6–3, 6–2.

== Seeds ==
1. (Brazil) Marcelo Demoliner / (Brazil) João Souza (final)
2. (Netherlands) Thiemo de Bakker / (Brazil) André Sá (champion)
3. (Argentina) Guillermo Durán / (Argentina) Andrés Molteni (semifinals)
4. (El Salvador) Marcelo Arévalo / (Colombia) Nicolás Barrientos (first round)

== Draw ==
=== Key ===
- Q = Qualifier
- WC = Wild card
- LL = Lucky loser
- Alt = Alternate
- SE = Special exempt
- PR = Protected ranking
- ITF = ITF entry
- JE = Junior exempt
- w/o = Walkover
- r = Retired
- d = Defaulted
- SR = Special ranking

=== Draw ===
First round
1	(Brazil) M Demoliner (Brazil) J Souza	4	6	[10]
(Brazil) T Fernandes (Brazil) B Sant'Anna	6	3	[4]
(Argentina) JI Londero (Argentina) DS Schwartzman	5	1
(Brazil) F de Paula (Brazil) Tiago Lopes	7	6
4	(El Salvador) M Arévalo (Colombia) N Barrientos	6	5	[5]
(Brazil) R Hocevar (Sweden) C Lindell	2	7	[10]
Alt	(Chile) Bastián Malla (Brazil) A Schneiter	7	1	[6]
(Brazil) G Clezar (Brazil) L Kirche	5	6	[10]
(Argentina) G Andreozzi (Argentina) A Velotti	2	1
(Peru) S Galdós (Argentina) M Trungelliti	6	6
(Ecuador) JC Campozano (Ecuador) E Gómez	2	0^{r}
3	(Argentina) G Durán (Argentina) A Molteni	6	0
WC	(Brazil) Lucas Biato Bernardo (Brazil) Maurício Cassimiro de Oliveira	6	6
WC	(Brazil) Mateus Alves (Brazil) Victor Grassani	4	4
WC	(Brazil) Wilson Leite (Brazil) Carlos Eduardo Severino	1	1
2	(Netherlands) T de Bakker (Brazil) A Sá	6	6

Quarterfinals
1	(Brazil) M Demoliner (Brazil) J Souza	6^{5}	7^{7}	[12]
(Brazil) F de Paula (Brazil) Tiago Lopes	7^{7}	6^{3}	[10]
(Brazil) R Hocevar (Sweden) C Lindell	3	2
(Brazil) G Clezar (Brazil) L Kirche	6	6
(Peru) S Galdós (Argentina) M Trungelliti	4	1
3	(Argentina) G Durán (Argentina) A Molteni	6	6
WC	(Brazil) LB Bernardo (Brazil) MC de Oliveira	1	0
2	(Netherlands) T de Bakker (Brazil) A Sá	6	6

Semifinals
1	(Brazil) M Demoliner (Brazil) J Souza	6	6
(Brazil) G Clezar (Brazil) L Kirche	4	3
3	(Argentina) G Durán (Argentina) A Molteni	6^{4}	4
2	(Netherlands) T de Bakker (Brazil) A Sá	7^{7}	6

Final
1	(Brazil) M Demoliner (Brazil) J Souza	3	2
2	(Netherlands) T de Bakker (Brazil) A Sá	6	6
