= 2022 Aberto Santa Catarina de Tenis – Singles =

Singles
- 2022 Aberto Santa Catarina de Tenis

Final
- Champion: (Brazil) Igor Marcondes
- Runner-up: (Argentina) Juan Bautista Torres
- Score: 3–6, 7–5, 6–1

Events
Singles	Doubles
- Aberto Santa Catarina de Tenis

Antonio Veić was the reigning champion but did not defend his title as he retired from professional tennis.

Igor Marcondes won the title after defeating Juan Bautista Torres 3–6, 7–5, 6–1 in the final.

== Seeds ==
1. (Spain) Fernando Verdasco (second round)
2. (Brazil) Orlando Luz (first round)
3. (Argentina) Genaro Alberto Olivieri (semifinals)
4. (Chile) Gonzalo Lama (first round)
5. (Brazil) Igor Marcondes (champion)
6. (Argentina) Hernán Casanova (first round)
7. (Spain) Carlos Gimeno Valero (first round)
8. (Argentina) Facundo Díaz Acosta (quarterfinals)

== Draw ==
Key

- Q = Qualifier
- WC = Wild card
- LL = Lucky loser
- Alt = Alternate
- ITF = ITF entry
- PR = Protected ranking
- SR = Special ranking
- SE = Special exempt
- JE = Junior exempt
- JR = Junior Accelerator Programme entrant
- CO = College Accelerator Programme entrant
- NG = Next Gen Accelerator Program entrant
- w/o = Walkover
- r = Retired
- d = Defaulted

=== Finals ===
Semifinals
5	(Brazil) Igor Marcondes	7	6
3	(Argentina) Genaro Alberto Olivieri	5	3
(Argentina) Juan Pablo Paz	4	0^{r}
(Argentina) Juan Bautista Torres	6	3

Final
5	(Brazil) Igor Marcondes	3	7	6
(Argentina) Juan Bautista Torres	6	5	1

=== Top half ===
First round
1	(Spain) F Verdasco	6	6
Q	(Brazil) E Ribeiro	3	2
(United States) N Moreno de Alboran	6	6
Alt	(United States) S Kirchheimer	1	3
WC	(Brazil) Matheus Amorim de Lima	6	1	6
(Germany) M Rosenkranz	3	6	3
Alt	(Brazil) M Alves	4	4
5	(Brazil) I Marcondes	6	6
3	(Argentina) GA Olivieri	6	2
Q	(Brazil) J Pereira	2	0^{r}
(Colombia) C Rodríguez	3	6	6
(France) Jules Okala	6	1	2
Alt	(Brazil) JL Reis da Silva	1	0
(Argentina) Facundo Juárez	6	6
WC	(Brazil) P Boscardin Dias	6	6
6	(Argentina) H Casanova	2	1

Second round
1	(Spain) F Verdasco	5	3
(United States) N Moreno de Alboran	7	6
WC	(Brazil) MA de Lima	0	1
5	(Brazil) I Marcondes	6	6
3	(Argentina) GA Olivieri	6	6
(Colombia) C Rodríguez	2	0
(Argentina) F Juárez	6	6
WC	(Brazil) P Boscardin Dias	3	0

Quarterfinals
(United States) N Moreno de Alboran	6	6^{6}	6^{4}
5	(Brazil) I Marcondes	4	7^{8}	7^{7}
3	(Argentina) GA Olivieri	6^{4}	6	6
(Argentina) F Juárez	7^{7}	2	4

Semifinals
5	(Brazil) I Marcondes	7	6
3	(Argentina) GA Olivieri	5	3

=== Bottom half ===
First round
7	(Spain) C Gimeno Valero	6	3	1
(Argentina) G Villanueva	0	6	6
Q	(Uruguay) I Carou	6	1	6
WC	(Brazil) JVC Loureiro	4	6	3
(Brazil) D Dutra da Silva	4	6	2
(United States) N Rubin	6	4	6
(Argentina) JP Paz	6^{1}	7^{11}	6
4	(Chile) G Lama	7^{7}	6^{9}	3
8	(Argentina) F Díaz Acosta	6	6
Q	(France) Quentin Folliot	3	0
(Brazil) P Sakamoto	4	6	6
Q	(Argentina) RA Burruchaga	6	3	2
(Spain) José Francisco Vidal Azorín	6	6
Q	(Slovenia) T Lipovšek Puches	3	3
(Argentina) JB Torres	6^{5}	6	6
2	(Brazil) O Luz	7^{7}	4	4

Second round
(Argentina) G Villanueva	1	6	6
Q	(Uruguay) I Carou	6	1	2
(United States) N Rubin	7^{8}	6^{1}	3
(Argentina) JP Paz	6^{6}	7^{7}	6
8	(Argentina) F Díaz Acosta	6	6
(Brazil) P Sakamoto	4	3
(Spain) JF Vidal Azorín	6	4	3
(Argentina) JB Torres	4	6	6

Quarterfinals
(Argentina) G Villanueva	3	4
(Argentina) JP Paz	6	6
8	(Argentina) F Díaz Acosta	4	4
(Argentina) JB Torres	6	6

Semifinals
(Argentina) JP Paz	4	0^{r}
(Argentina) JB Torres	6	3
