= 2012 Peugeot Tennis Cup =

- Date: 15 – 21 October
- Edition: 1st
- Surface: Clay
- Location: Rio de Janeiro, Brazil

Champions

Singles
- (Portugal) Gastão Elias

Doubles
- (Brazil) Marcelo Demoliner / (Brazil) João Souza
Peugeot Tennis Cup	· 2013 →

The 2012 Peugeot Tennis Cup was a professional tennis tournament played on clay courts. It was the first edition of the tournament which was part of the 2012 ATP Challenger Tour. It took place in Rio de Janeiro, Brazil between 15 and 21 October 2012.

== Singles main draw entrants ==
=== Seeds ===
Country	Player	Rank^{1}	Seed
ESP	Rubén Ramírez Hidalgo	92	1
POR	João Sousa	102	2
ROU	Adrian Ungur	118	3
ARG	Guido Pella	126	4
BRA	Thiago Alves	127	5
BRA	João Souza	131	6
USA	Wayne Odesnik	137	7
POR	Frederico Gil	138	8

- ^{1} Rankings are as of October 8, 2012.

=== Other entrants ===
The following players received wildcards into the singles main draw:

- (Brazil) Fabiano de Paula
- (Brazil) Ricardo Hocevar
- (Brazil) Tiago Lopes
- (Brazil) Thiago Monteiro

The following players received entry from the qualifying draw:

- (Colombia) Juan Sebastián Cabal
- (Serbia) Marko Djokovic
- (Brazil) André Ghem
- (Brazil) José Pereira

== Champions ==
=== Singles ===
- (Portugal) Gastão Elias def. (Serbia) Boris Pašanski, 6–3, 7–5

=== Doubles ===
- (Brazil) Marcelo Demoliner / (Brazil) João Souza def. (Portugal) Frederico Gil / (Portugal) Pedro Sousa, 6–2, 6–4
