= 2013 Peugeot Tennis Cup =

- Date: 5 – 11 August
- Edition: 2nd
- Surface: Clay
- Location: Rio de Janeiro, Brazil

Champions

Singles
- (Argentina) Agustín Velotti

Doubles
- (Netherlands) Thiemo de Bakker / (Brazil) André Sá
← 2012 ·	Peugeot Tennis Cup	· 2014 →

The 2013 Peugeot Tennis Cup was a professional tennis tournament played on clay courts. It is the second edition of the tournament which was part of the 2013 ATP Challenger Tour. It took place in Rio de Janeiro, Brazil between 5 and 11 August 2013.

== Singles main draw entrants ==
=== Seeds ===
Country	Player	Rank^{1}	Seed
NED	Thiemo de Bakker	102	1
BRA	João Souza	122	2
ARG	Diego Schwartzman	133	3
COL	Alejandro González	137	4
CHI	Paul Capdeville	149	5
ARG	Guido Andreozzi	131	6
BRA	André Ghem	201	7
BRA	Guilherme Clezar	216	8

- ^{1} Rankings are as of July 30, 2013.

=== Other entrants ===
The following players received wildcards into the singles main draw:

- (Brazil) Carlos Eduardo Severino
- (Sweden) Christian Lindell
- (Brazil) Wilson Leite
- (Ecuador) Emilio Gómez

The following players received entry from the qualifying draw:

- (Argentina) Juan Ignacio Londero
- (Chile) Bastián Malla
- (Brazil) Tiago Fernandes
- (Chile) Christian Garin

== Champions ==
=== Singles ===
- (Argentina) Agustín Velotti def. (Slovenia) Blaž Rola 6–3, 6-4

=== Doubles ===
- (Netherlands) Thiemo de Bakker / (Brazil) André Sá def. (Brazil) Marcelo Demoliner / (Brazil) João Souza
