= 2011 Aberto Santa Catarina de Tenis =

- Date: April 11–17
- Edition: 6th
- Location: Blumenau, Brazil

Champions

Singles
- (Argentina) José Acasuso

Doubles
- (Brazil) Franco Ferreiro / (Brazil) André Sá
← 2010 ·	Aberto Santa Catarina de Tenis	· 2012 →

The 2011 Aberto Santa Catarina de Tenis was a professional tennis tournament played on clay courts. It was the sixth edition of the tournament which was part of the 2011 ATP Challenger Tour. It took place in Blumenau, Brazil between 11 and 17 April 2011.

== ATP entrants ==
=== Seeds ===
Nationality	Player	Ranking*	Seeding
BRA	Ricardo Mello	86	1
BRA	Marcos Daniel	106	2
BRA	João Souza	126	3
FRA	Éric Prodon	128	4
ARG	Diego Junqueira	141	5
ARG	Leonardo Mayer	160	6
JPN	Tatsuma Ito	166	7
ECU	Giovanni Lapentti	170	8

- Rankings are as of April 4, 2011.

=== Other entrants ===
The following players received wildcards into the singles main draw:

- (Brazil) Marcelo Demoliner
- (Brazil) Thiago Moura Monteiro
- (Brazil) Thales Turini
- (Brazil) Bruno Volkmann

The following entrant has been granted a Special Exemption into the main draw:

- (Brazil) Tiago Fernandes
- (Spain) Javier Martí

The following players received entry from the qualifying draw:

- (Argentina) Martín Alund
- (Slovenia) Aljaž Bedene
- (Brazil) André Ghem
- (Argentina) Martín Vassallo Argüello

== Champions ==
=== Singles ===
(Argentina) José Acasuso def. (Brazil) Marcelo Demoliner, 6–2, 6–2

=== Doubles ===
(Brazil) Franco Ferreiro / (Brazil) André Sá def. (Spain) Adrián Menéndez / (Portugal) Leonardo Tavares, 6–2, 3–6, [10–4]
