= 2010 Aberto Santa Catarina de Tenis =

- Date: April 12 – April 18
- Edition: 5th
- Location: Blumenau, Brazil

Champions

Singles
- (Brazil) Marcos Daniel

Doubles
- (Brazil) Franco Ferreiro / (Brazil) André Sá
← 2009 ·	Aberto Santa Catarina de Tenis	· 2011 →

The 2010 Aberto Santa Catarina de Tenis was a professional tennis tournament played on outdoor red clay courts. It was part of the 2010 ATP Challenger Tour. It took place in Blumenau, Brazil between 12 and 18 April 2010.

== Single main-draw entrants ==
=== Seeds ===
Nationality	Player	Ranking*	Seeding
CHI	Nicolás Massú	94	1
SLO	Blaž Kavčič	100	2
BRA	Ricardo Mello	106	3
BRA	Marcos Daniel	111	4
BRA	Thiago Alves	121	5
BRA	Júlio Silva	156	6
ARG	Juan Pablo Brzezicki	173	7
ARG	Diego Junqueira	181	8

- Rankings are as of April 5, 2010.

=== Other entrants ===
The following players received wildcards into the singles main draw:

- (Brazil) Guilherme Clézar
- (Brazil) Rodrigo Guidolin
- (Brazil) Tiago Fernandes
- (Brazil) Bruno Wolkmann

The following players received entry from the qualifying draw:

- (Brazil) Leonardo Kirche
- (Brazil) Tiago Lopes
- (Brazil) André Miele
- (Peru) Iván Miranda

== Champions ==
=== Singles ===
(Brazil) Marcos Daniel def. (Germany) Bastian Knittel, 7–5, 6–7(5), 6–4

=== Doubles ===
(Brazil) Franco Ferreiro / (Brazil) André Sá def. (Brazil) André Ghem / (Italy) Simone Vagnozzi, 6–4, 6–3
