= 2020 Córdoba Open =

Tennis tournament in Argentina

- Date: 3–9 February
- Edition: 2nd
- Category: ATP Tour 250 series
- Draw: 28S / 16D
- Prize money: $546,355
- Surface: Clay / outdoor
- Location: Córdoba, Argentina
- Venue: Estadio Mario Alberto Kempes

Champions

Singles
- (Chile) Cristian Garín

Doubles
- (Brazil) Marcelo Demoliner / (Netherlands) Matwé Middelkoop
← 2019 ·	Córdoba Open	· 2021 →

The 2020 Córdoba Open was a men's tennis tournament played on outdoor clay courts. It was the second edition of the Córdoba Open, and part of the ATP Tour 250 series of the 2020 ATP Tour. It took place at the Estadio Mario Alberto Kempes in Córdoba, Argentina, from 3 February until 9 February 2020. Third-seeded Cristian Garín won the singles title.

== Finals ==
=== Singles ===
- (Chile) Cristian Garín defeated (Argentina) Diego Schwartzman, 2–6, 6–4, 6–0

=== Doubles ===
- (Brazil) Marcelo Demoliner / (Netherlands) Matwé Middelkoop defeated (Argentina) Leonardo Mayer / (Argentina) Andrés Molteni, 6–3, 7–6^{(7–4)}

== Singles main-draw entrants ==
=== Seeds ===
Country	Player	Rank^{1}	Seed
ARG	Diego Schwartzman	14	1
ARG	Guido Pella	25	2
CHI	Cristian Garín	36	3
SRB	Laslo Đere	40	4
ESP	Albert Ramos Viñolas	42	5
URU	Pablo Cuevas	46	6
ESP	Fernando Verdasco	51	7
ARG	Juan Ignacio Londero	52	8

- ^{1} Rankings are as of January 20, 2020

=== Other entrants ===
The following players received wildcards into the singles main draw:

- (Argentina) Pedro Cachin
- ~~(Argentina) Francisco Cerúndolo~~
- (Chile) Cristian Garín

The following players received entry from the qualifying draw:

- (Argentina) Facundo Bagnis
- (Argentina) Juan Pablo Ficovich
- (Spain) Pedro Martínez
- (Spain) Carlos Taberner

The following players received entry as lucky losers:

- (Italy) Federico Gaio
- (Slovakia) Filip Horanský

=== Withdrawals ===
Before the tournament

- (Spain) Roberto Carballés Baena → replaced by (Italy) Federico Gaio
- (Argentina) Francisco Cerúndolo → replaced by (Slovakia) Filip Horanský
- (Chile) Nicolás Jarry → replaced by (Argentina) Federico Coria
- (Norway) Casper Ruud → replaced by (Hungary) Attila Balázs

== Doubles main-draw entrants ==
=== Seeds ===
Country	Player	Country	Player	Rank^{1}	Seed
ARG	Máximo González	FRA	Fabrice Martin	59	1
BEL	Sander Gillé	BEL	Joran Vliegen	81	2
BRA	Marcelo Demoliner	NED	Matwé Middelkoop	105	3
ARG	Leonardo Mayer	ARG	Andrés Molteni	117	4

- ^{1} Rankings are as of January 20, 2020

=== Other entrants ===
The following pairs received wildcards into the doubles main draw:

- (Argentina) Pedro Cachin / (Argentina) Juan Pablo Ficovich
- ~~(Argentina) Andrea Collarini / (Argentina) Facundo Mena~~

The following pairs received entry as alternates:

- (Italy) Federico Gaio / (Spain) Pedro Martínez
- ~~(Italy) Alessandro Giannessi / (Italy) Gianluca Mager~~

=== Withdrawals ===
Before the tournament

- (Spain) Roberto Carballés Baena
- (Italy) Gianluca Mager
- (Argentina) Facundo Mena

During the tournament

- (Argentina) Guido Pella
- (Spain) Albert Ramos Viñolas
