= 2020 Córdoba Open – Doubles =

Doubles
- 2020 Córdoba Open

Final
- Champions: (Brazil) Marcelo Demoliner (Netherlands) Matwé Middelkoop
- Runners-up: (Argentina) Leonardo Mayer (Argentina) Andrés Molteni
- Score: 6–3, 7–6^{(7–4)}

Events
Singles	Doubles
- Córdoba Open

Roman Jebavý and Andrés Molteni were the defending champions, but Jebavý chose to compete in Montpellier instead. Molteni played alongside Leonardo Mayer, but lost in the final to Marcelo Demoliner and Matwé Middelkoop, 3–6, 6–7^{(4–7)}.

== Seeds ==
1. (Argentina) Máximo González / (France) Fabrice Martin (semifinals)
2. (Belgium) Sander Gillé / (Belgium) Joran Vliegen (first round)
3. (Brazil) Marcelo Demoliner / (Netherlands) Matwé Middelkoop (champions)
4. (Argentina) Leonardo Mayer / (Argentina) Andrés Molteni (final)

== Draw ==
Key

- Q = Qualifier
- WC = Wild card
- LL = Lucky loser
- Alt = Alternate
- ITF = ITF entry
- PR = Protected ranking
- SR = Special ranking
- SE = Special exempt
- JE = Junior exempt
- JR = Junior Accelerator Programme entrant
- CO = College Accelerator Programme entrant
- NG = Next Gen Accelerator Program entrant
- w/o = Walkover
- r = Retired
- d = Defaulted

=== Draw ===
First round
1	(Argentina) M González (France) F Martin	6	6
(Spain) P Andújar (Argentina) H Zeballos	3	2
(Philippines) T Huey (United States) N Lammons	4	6	[6]
(Italy) M Cecchinato (Spain) A Ramos Viñolas	6	3	[10]
4	(Argentina) L Mayer (Argentina) A Molteni	6	1	[10]
(Argentina) G Durán (Argentina) JI Londero	3	6	[5]
(Uruguay) P Cuevas (Bolivia) H Dellien	4	5
(Argentina) F Bagnis (Argentina) G Pella	6	7
Alt	(Italy) F Gaio (Spain) P Martínez	7^{7}	6
(Argentina) F Coria (Chile) C Garín	6^{5}	1
WC	(Argentina) P Cachin (Argentina) JP Ficovich	1	1
3	(Brazil) M Demoliner (Netherlands) M Middelkoop	6	6
Alt	(Italy) A Giannessi (Italy) G Mager
(Brazil) T Monteiro (Brazil) F Romboli	w/o
(Uruguay) A Behar (Ecuador) G Escobar	3	6	[11]
2	(Belgium) S Gillé (Belgium) J Vliegen	6	3	[9]

Quarterfinals
1	(Argentina) M González (France) F Martin	w/o
(Italy) M Cecchinato (Spain) A Ramos Viñolas
4	(Argentina) L Mayer (Argentina) A Molteni	w/o
(Argentina) F Bagnis (Argentina) G Pella
Alt	(Italy) F Gaio (Spain) P Martínez	6^{5}	2
3	(Brazil) M Demoliner (Netherlands) M Middelkoop	7^{7}	6
(Brazil) T Monteiro (Brazil) F Romboli	6	3	[11]
(Uruguay) A Behar (Ecuador) G Escobar	4	6	[13]

Semifinals
1	(Argentina) M González (France) F Martin	4	6	[8]
4	(Argentina) L Mayer (Argentina) A Molteni	6	3	[10]
3	(Brazil) M Demoliner (Netherlands) M Middelkoop	6	6
(Uruguay) A Behar (Ecuador) G Escobar	4	3

Final
4	(Argentina) L Mayer (Argentina) A Molteni	3	6^{4}
3	(Brazil) M Demoliner (Netherlands) M Middelkoop	6	7^{7}
