= 2020 Córdoba Open – Singles =

Singles
- 2020 Córdoba Open

Final
- Champion: (Chile) Cristian Garín
- Runner-up: (Argentina) Diego Schwartzman
- Score: 2–6, 6–4, 6–0

Details
- Draw: 28 (4 Q / 3 WC )
- Seeds: 8

Events
Singles	Doubles
- Córdoba Open

Juan Ignacio Londero was the defending champion, but lost to Laslo Đere in the quarterfinals.

Cristian Garín won the title, defeating Diego Schwartzman in the final, 2–6, 6–4, 6–0.

== Seeds ==
The top four seeds received a bye into the second round.

1. (Argentina) Diego Schwartzman (final)
2. (Argentina) Guido Pella (second round)
3. (Chile) Cristian Garín (champion)
4. (Serbia) Laslo Đere (semifinals)
5. (Spain) Albert Ramos Viñolas (quarterfinals)
6. (Uruguay) Pablo Cuevas (quarterfinals)
7. (Spain) Fernando Verdasco (first round)
8. (Argentina) Juan Ignacio Londero (quarterfinals)

== Draw ==
Key

- Q = Qualifier
- WC = Wild card
- LL = Lucky loser
- Alt = Alternate
- ITF = ITF entry
- PR = Protected ranking
- SR = Special ranking
- SE = Special exempt
- JE = Junior exempt
- JR = Junior Accelerator Programme entrant
- CO = College Accelerator Programme entrant
- NG = Next Gen Accelerator Program entrant
- w/o = Walkover
- r = Retired
- d = Defaulted

=== Finals ===
Semifinals
1	(Argentina) Diego Schwartzman	6	1	6
4	(Serbia) Laslo Đere	1	6	2
3/WC	(Chile) Cristian Garín	2	6	6
(Slovakia) Andrej Martin	6	2	2

Final
1	(Argentina) Diego Schwartzman	6	4	0
3/WC	(Chile) Cristian Garín	2	6	6

=== Top half ===
First round
(Argentina) L Mayer	4	3
(Spain) J Munar	6	6
LL	(Slovakia) F Horanský	2	2
(Spain) P Andújar	6	6
Q	(Argentina) F Bagnis	4	6^{3}
5	(Spain) A Ramos Viñolas	6	7^{7}
LL	(Italy) F Gaio	6	3	4
Q	(Spain) P Martínez	4	6	6
(Bolivia) H Dellien	1	1
WC	(Argentina) P Cachin	6	6
(Italy) M Cecchinato	2	5
8	(Argentina) JI Londero	6	7

Second round
1	(Argentina) D Schwartzman	6	7
(Spain) J Munar	1	5
(Spain) P Andújar	3	7^{7}	4
5	(Spain) A Ramos Viñolas	6	6^{4}	6
4	(Serbia) L Đere	6	6
Q	(Spain) P Martínez	3	4
WC	(Argentina) P Cachin	3	3
8	(Argentina) JI Londero	6	6

Quarterfinals
1	(Argentina) D Schwartzman	6	7^{7}
5	(Spain) A Ramos Viñolas	0	6^{0}
4	(Serbia) L Đere	6^{5}	6	7^{7}
8	(Argentina) JI Londero	7^{7}	3	6^{5}

Semifinals
1	(Argentina) D Schwartzman	6	1	6
4	(Serbia) L Đere	1	6	2

=== Bottom half ===
First round
6	(Uruguay) P Cuevas	7	6
(Argentina) F Delbonis	5	2
Q	(Argentina) JP Ficovich	2	6	2
(Italy) G Mager	6	3	6
(Italy) L Sonego	2	6^{3}
(Hungary) A Balázs	6	7^{7}
7	(Spain) F Verdasco	6	1	4
Q	(Spain) C Taberner	4	6	6
(Argentina) F Coria	6^{5}	4
(Slovakia) A Martin	7^{7}	6
(France) C Moutet	6	6
(Brazil) T Monteiro	4	3

Second round
6	(Uruguay) P Cuevas	6^{5}	7^{7}	6
(Italy) G Mager	7^{7}	6^{2}	1
(Hungary) A Balázs	3	0
3/WC	(Chile) C Garín	6	6
Q	(Spain) C Taberner	3	6^{7}
(Slovakia) A Martin	6	7^{9}
(France) C Moutet	6^{4}	7	6
2	(Argentina) G Pella	7^{7}	5	3

Quarterfinals
6	(Uruguay) P Cuevas	6	3	4
3/WC	(Chile) C Garín	1	6	6
(Slovakia) A Martin	6	6
(France) C Moutet	3	2

Semifinals
3/WC	(Chile) C Garín	2	6	6
(Slovakia) A Martin	6	2	2

== Qualifying ==
=== Seeds ===
1. (Argentina) Facundo Bagnis (qualified)
2. (Portugal) Pedro Sousa (first round)
3. (Peru) Juan Pablo Varillas (qualifying competition, retired)
4. (Italy) Alessandro Giannessi (first round)
5. (Italy) Federico Gaio (qualifying competition, lucky loser)
6. (Spain) Pedro Martínez (qualified)
7. (Slovakia) Filip Horanský (qualifying competition, lucky loser)
8. (Portugal) João Domingues (first round)

=== Qualifiers ===
1. (Argentina) Facundo Bagnis
2. (Argentina) Juan Pablo Ficovich
3. (Spain) Carlos Taberner
4. (Spain) Pedro Martínez

=== Lucky losers ===
1. (Italy) Federico Gaio
2. (Slovakia) Filip Horanský

=== Qualifying draw ===
==== First qualifier ====
First round
1	(Argentina) Facundo Bagnis	1	6	6
(Spain) Mario Vilella Martínez	6	2	1
(Argentina) Facundo Mena	5	2
5	(Italy) Federico Gaio	7	6

Qualifying competition
1	(Argentina) Facundo Bagnis	6	6
5	(Italy) Federico Gaio	4	2

==== Second qualifier ====
First round
2	(Portugal) Pedro Sousa	5	3
(Argentina) Juan Pablo Ficovich	7	6
(Argentina) Andrea Collarini	3	4
7	(Slovakia) Filip Horanský	6	6

Qualifying competition
(Argentina) Juan Pablo Ficovich	6	4	6
7	(Slovakia) Filip Horanský	2	6	4

==== Third qualifier ====
First round
3	(Peru) Juan Pablo Varillas	6	7^{7}
(Brazil) Thiago Seyboth Wild	2	6^{4}
(Spain) Carlos Taberner	5	7	6
8	(Portugal) João Domingues	7	5	1

Qualifying competition
3	(Peru) Juan Pablo Varillas	3	2^{r}
(Spain) Carlos Taberner	6	4

==== Fourth qualifier ====
First round
4	(Italy) Alessandro Giannessi	1	6	2
WC	(Argentina) Facundo Díaz Acosta	6	3	6
WC	(Argentina) Renzo Olivo	7^{7}	2	2
6	(Spain) Pedro Martínez	6^{4}	6	6

Qualifying competition
WC	(Argentina) Facundo Díaz Acosta	4	3
6	(Spain) Pedro Martínez	6	6
