= 2022 Aberto Santa Catarina de Tenis – Doubles =

Doubles
- 2022 Aberto Santa Catarina de Tenis

Final
- Champions: (Bolivia) Boris Arias (Bolivia) Federico Zeballos
- Runners-up: (Ecuador) Diego Hidalgo (Colombia) Cristian Rodríguez
- Score: 7–6^{(7–3)}, 6–1

Events
Singles	Doubles
- Aberto Santa Catarina de Tenis

Marin Draganja and Dino Marcan were the reigning champions, but did not defend their title as they had both retired from professional tennis.

Boris Arias and Federico Zeballos won the title after defeating Diego Hidalgo and Cristian Rodríguez 7–6^{(7–3)}, 6–1 in the final.

== Seeds ==
1. (Ecuador) Diego Hidalgo / (Colombia) Cristian Rodríguez (final)
2. (Brazil) Orlando Luz / (Brazil) Igor Marcondes (semifinals, retired)
3. (Argentina) Hernán Casanova / (Peru) Alexander Merino (withdrew)
4. (Bolivia) Boris Arias / (Bolivia) Federico Zeballos (champions)
5. (Brazil) Mateus Alves / (Peru) Conner Huertas del Pino (quarterfinals)

== Draw ==
Key

- Q = Qualifier
- WC = Wild card
- LL = Lucky loser
- Alt = Alternate
- ITF = ITF entry
- PR = Protected ranking
- SR = Special ranking
- SE = Special exempt
- JE = Junior exempt
- JR = Junior Accelerator Programme entrant
- CO = College Accelerator Programme entrant
- NG = Next Gen Accelerator Program entrant
- w/o = Walkover
- r = Retired
- d = Defaulted

First round
1	(Ecuador) D Hidalgo (Colombia) C Rodríguez	6	6
(France) Quentin Folliot (Germany) M Rosenkranz	2	2
5	(Brazil) M Alves (Peru) C Huertas del Pino	6	0
(Brazil) P Boscardin Dias (Brazil) J Pereira	2	0^{r}
(Brazil) D Dutra da Silva (Spain) José Francisco Vidal Azorín	w/o
(Argentina) Facundo Juárez (Slovenia) T Lipovšek Puches
(Argentina) GA Olivieri (Argentina) G Villanueva	w/o
(Spain) J Martí (United States) N Moreno de Alboran
WC	(Brazil) Wilson Leite (Brazil) E Ribeiro	5	6	5
4	(Bolivia) B Arias (Bolivia) F Zeballos	7	3	[10]
(Brazil) JVC Loureiro (Brazil) Gabriel Roveri Sidney	1	6	[9]
(Argentina) RA Burruchaga (Argentina) F Díaz Acosta	6	4	[11]
(Uruguay) I Carou (Argentina) JB Torres	3	4
2	(Brazil) O Luz (Brazil) I Marcondes	6	6

Quarterfinals
1	(Ecuador) D Hidalgo (Colombia) C Rodríguez	6	6
(Brazil) JL Reis da Silva (Brazil) P Sakamoto	4	4
5	(Brazil) M Alves (Peru) C Huertas del Pino	2	3
(Brazil) D Dutra da Silva (Spain) JF Vidal Azorín	6	6
(Argentina) GA Olivieri (Argentina) G Villanueva	2	1
4	(Bolivia) B Arias (Bolivia) F Zeballos	6	6
(Argentina) RA Burruchaga (Argentina) F Díaz Acosta	5^{r}
2	(Brazil) O Luz (Brazil) I Marcondes	5

Semifinals
1	(Ecuador) D Hidalgo (Colombia) C Rodríguez	w/o
(Brazil) D Dutra da Silva (Spain) JF Vidal Azorín
4	(Bolivia) B Arias (Bolivia) F Zeballos	6	0
2	(Brazil) O Luz (Brazil) I Marcondes	4	0^{r}

Final
1	(Ecuador) D Hidalgo (Colombia) C Rodríguez	6^{3}	1
4	(Bolivia) B Arias (Bolivia) F Zeballos	7^{7}	6
