= 2022 Aberto Santa Catarina de Tenis =

- Date: 10 – 16 January
- Edition: 8th
- Draw: 32S / 16D
- Surface: Clay
- Location: Blumenau, Brazil

Champions

Singles
- (Brazil) Igor Marcondes

Doubles
- (Bolivia) Boris Arias / (Bolivia) Federico Zeballos
- Blumenau Challenger

The 2022 Blumenau Challenger - Circuito Dove Men+Care La Legión was a professional tennis tournament played on clay courts. It was the eighth edition of the tournament which was part of the 2022 ATP Challenger Tour. It took place in Blumenau, Brazil between 10 and 16 January 2022.

== Singles main draw entrants ==
=== Seeds ===
Country	Player	Rank^{1}	Seed
ESP	Fernando Verdasco	154	1
BRA	Orlando Luz	295	2
ARG	Genaro Alberto Olivieri	313	3
CHI	Gonzalo Lama	322	4
BRA	Igor Marcondes	324	5
ARG	Hernán Casanova	325	6
ESP	Carlos Gimeno Valero	329	7
ARG	Facundo Díaz Acosta	338	8

- ^{1} Rankings as of 3 January 2022.

=== Other entrants ===
The following players received wildcards into the singles main draw:

- (Brazil) Pedro Boscardin Dias
- (Brazil) Matheus Amorim de Lima
- (Brazil) João Victor Couto Loureiro

The following players received entry into the singles main draw as alternates:

- (Brazil) Mateus Alves
- (United States) Strong Kirchheimer
- (Brazil) João Lucas Reis da Silva

The following players received entry from the qualifying draw:

- (Argentina) Román Andrés Burruchaga
- (Uruguay) Ignacio Carou
- (France) Quentin Folliot
- (Slovenia) Tomás Lipovšek Puches
- (Brazil) José Pereira
- (Brazil) Eduardo Ribeiro

== Champions ==
=== Singles ===
- (Brazil) Igor Marcondes def. (Argentina) Juan Bautista Torres 3–6, 7–5, 6–1.

=== Doubles ===
- (Bolivia) Boris Arias / (Bolivia) Federico Zeballos def. (Ecuador) Diego Hidalgo / (Colombia) Cristian Rodríguez 7–6^{(7–3)}, 6–1.
