= Peugeot Tennis Cup =

- 2013 Peugeot Tennis Cup

Defunct tennis tournament
- Location: Rio de Janeiro, Brazil
- Venue: Jockey Club Brasileiro
- Category: ATP Challenger Tour
- Surface: Clay
- Draw: 32S/16Q/16D
- Prize money: US$50,000+H
- Website: Website

The Peugeot Tennis Cup was a tennis tournament held in Rio de Janeiro, Brazil in 2012 and 2013. The event was part of the ATP Challenger Tour and was played on clay courts.

== Past finals ==
=== Singles ===
Year	Champion	Runner-up	Score	Ref.
2013	(Argentina) Agustín Velotti	(Slovenia) Blaž Rola	6–3, 6–4	
2012	(Portugal) Gastão Elias	(Serbia) Boris Pašanski	6–3, 7–5	

=== Doubles ===
Year	Champions	Runners-up	Score
2013	(Netherlands) Thiemo de Bakker (Brazil) André Sá	(Brazil) Marcelo Demoliner (Brazil) João Souza	6–3, 6–2
2012	(Brazil) Marcelo Demoliner (Brazil) João Souza	(Portugal) Frederico Gil (Portugal) Pedro Sousa	6–2, 6–4
