= Antonio Veić =

Croatian tennis player and coach

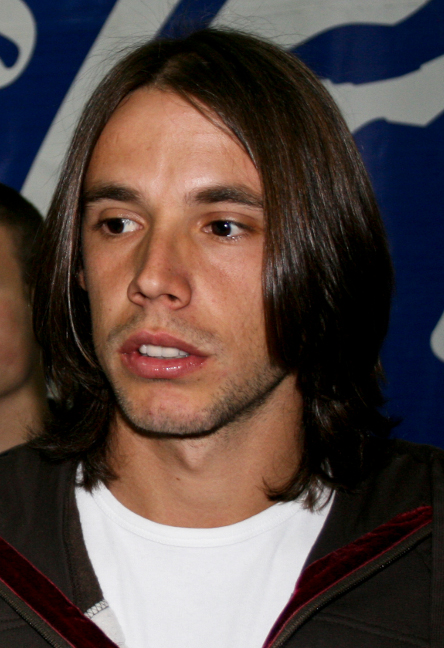
- Country (sports): Croatia
- Residence: Mali Lošinj, Croatia
- Born: 18 February 1988 (age 38) Mali Lošinj, SR Croatia, Yugoslavia
- Height: 1.80 m (5 ft 11 in)
- Turned pro: 2006
- Plays: Right-handed (two-handed backhand)
- Prize money: $560,536

Singles
- Career record: 11–24
- Career titles: 0
- Highest ranking: No. 119 (14 May 2012)

Grand Slam singles results
- Australian Open: 2R (2010)
- French Open: 3R (2011)
- Wimbledon: Q1 (2012)
- US Open: Q3 (2011)

Doubles
- Career record: 3–5
- Career titles: 0
- Highest ranking: No. 120 (19 November 2012)

Antonio Veić (born 18 February 1988) is a Croatian former professional tennis player and a coach. His highest singles ranking is No. 119 achieved on 14 May 2012 and a doubles ranking of No. 120 achieved on 19 November 2012.

== Tennis career ==
=== 2009 ===
Veić received a wild card for Zagreb Indoors and caused an upset as he beat ex-top 10 player Guillermo Cañas 4–6, 6–4, 6–2. Betfair started an internal investigation after Cañas had been "trading as a rank outsider" although Veić was considered an underdog before the match. Veić issued a brief statement calling the allegations 'ridiculous and unfounded'. Veić continued his successful run following a 3–6, 7–6, 6–4 victory over Evgeny Korolev. It came to an end after he lost to fellow Croat Marin Čilić 6–2, 7–6.

=== 2010 ===
Veic qualified for the 2010 Australian Open Men's Singles draw, where he beat Daniel Köllerer of Austria 6–4, 3–6, 6–7, 6–1, 6–4. He fell to Gaël Monfils 6–4, 6–4, 6–4.

== Challenger finals ==
=== Singles: 5 (1–4) ===
Legend
ATP Challenger Tour (1–4)

Outcome	No.	Date	Tournament	Surface	Opponent	Score
Runner-up	1.	12 April 2009	Monza, Italy	Clay	(Spain) David Marrero	7–5, 4–6, 4–6
Runner-up	2.	11 March 2012	Santiago, Chile	Clay	(Chile) Paul Capdeville	3–6, 7–6^{(7–5)}, 3–6
Winner	1.	15 April 2012	Blumenau, Brazil	Clay	(Chile) Paul Capdeville	3–6, 6–4, 5–2 RET
Runner-up	3.	4 August 2014	San Marino, San Marino	Clay	(Romania) Adrian Ungur	1–6, 0–6
Runner-up	4.	15 September 2014	Trnava, Slovakia	Clay	(Austria) Andreas Haider-Maurer	6–2, 3–6, 6–7^{(4–7)}
