= Rodrigo Guidolin =

Brazilian tennis player

- Country (sports): Brazil
- Born: September 20, 1985 (age 39); Piracicaba, Brazil
- Plays: Right-handed
- Prize money: $65,337

Singles
- Highest ranking: No. 340 (May 16, 2011)

Doubles
- Highest ranking: No. 167 (March 1, 2010)

Rodrigo Guidolin (born September 20, 1985), is a professional tennis player. He turned pro at age 17. In 2009 he won two Challenger level ATP doubles titles with partner Marcelo Demoliner.

== Ranking ==
Guidolin’s career high singles ranking was reached on May 16, 2011, attaining the rank of 340. His career high rank for doubles is 167, which he achieved on March 1, 2010.

== Win–loss record ==
Guidolin’s career win–loss record at the ATP/WTA Tour and ITF Pro Circuit main draw is 166 wins and 132 losses. His doubles record at the ATP/WTA Tour and ITF Pro Circuit main draw is 187 wins and 105 losses. In the ITF Pro Circuit main draw Guidolin’s career singles record is 160 wins versus 121 losses. Career doubles in the ITF Pro Circuit main draw was 159 wins to 82 losses.
