= Aberto Santa Catarina de Tenis =

Blumenau Challenger
- 2022 Aberto Santa Catarina de Tenis

Defunct tennis tournament
- Event name: Blumenau Challenger - Circuito Dove Men+Care La Legión (2022)
- Location: Blumenau (2009-2012, 2022), Florianópolis, Santa Catarina, Brazil
- Venue: Tabajara Tênis Clube
- Category: ATP Challenger 50
- Surface: Red clay
- Draw: 32S/24Q/16D
- Prize money: $ 37,520 (2022)

Current champions (2022)
- Singles: (Brazil) Igor Marcondes
- Doubles: (Bolivia) Boris Arias (Bolivia) Federico Zeballos

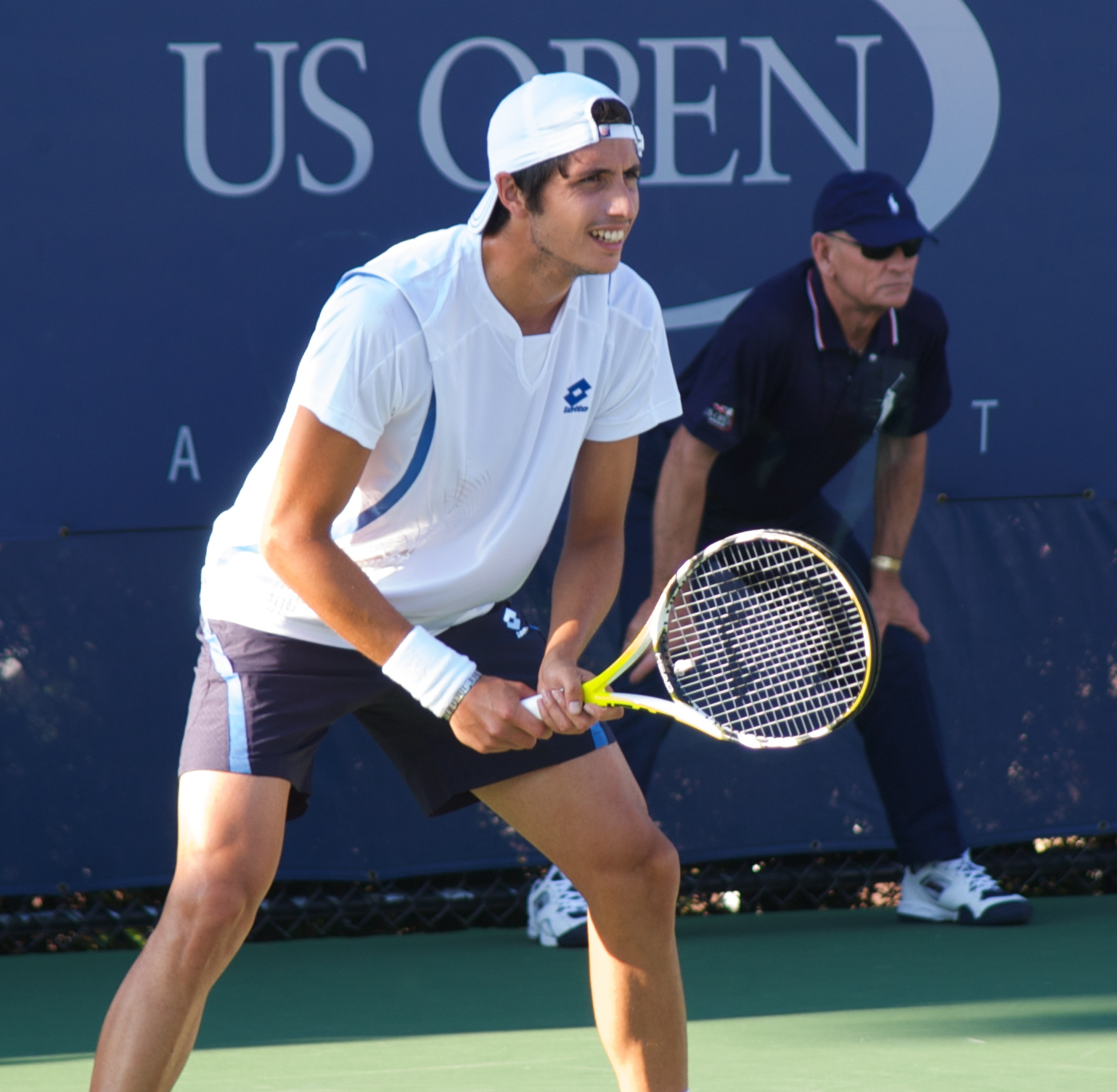
Chile's Paul Capdeville took the singles title in 2007 in Florianópolis

The Blumenau Challenger was a professional tennis tournament played on outdoor red clay courts. It was part of the ATP Challenger Tour. It was annually held in Florianópolis, Brazil from 2006 to 2008. It was then moved to Blumenau, Brazil, where it took place between 2009 and 2012, and in 2022.

== Past finals ==
=== Singles ===
| Location | Year | Champion | Runner-up | Score |
|---|---|---|---|---|
| Blumenau | 2022 | (Brazil) Igor Marcondes | (Argentina) Juan Bautista Torres | 3–6, 7–5, 6–1 |
| Blumenau | 2013–2021 | Not Held | | |
| Blumenau | 2012 | (Croatia) Antonio Veić | (Chile) Paul Capdeville | 3–6, 6–4, 5–2, retired |
| Blumenau | 2011 | (Argentina) José Acasuso | (Brazil) Marcelo Demoliner | 6–2, 6–2 |
| Blumenau | 2010 | (Brazil) Marcos Daniel | (Germany) Bastian Knittel | 7–5, 6–7(5), 6–4 |
| Blumenau | 2009 | (Brazil) Marcelo Demoliner | (Brazil) Rogério Dutra da Silva | 6–1, 6–0 |
| Florianópolis | 2008 | (Brazil) Thomaz Bellucci | (Brazil) Franco Ferreiro | 4–6, 6–4, 6–2 |
| Florianópolis | 2007 | (Chile) Paul Capdeville | (Argentina) Juan Pablo Guzmán | 7–6(0), 6–0 |
| Florianópolis | 2006 | (Brazil) Ricardo Mello | (Argentina) Diego Junqueira | 6–3, 5–7, 7–6(4) |

=== Doubles ===
| Location | Year | Champions | Runners-up | Score |
|---|---|---|---|---|
| Blumenau | 2022 | (Bolivia) Boris Arias (Bolivia) Federico Zeballos | (Ecuador) Diego Hidalgo (Colombia) Cristian Rodríguez | 7–6^{(7–3)}, 6–1 |
| Blumenau | 2013– 2021 | Not Held | | |
| Blumenau | 2012 | (Croatia) Marin Draganja (Croatia) Dino Marcan | (Slovenia) Blaž Kavčič (Croatia) Antonio Veić | 6–2, 6–0 |
| Blumenau | 2011 | (Brazil) Franco Ferreiro (Brazil) André Sá | (Spain) Adrián Menéndez (Portugal) Leonardo Tavares | 6–2, 3–6, [10–4] |
| Blumenau | 2010 | (Brazil) Franco Ferreiro (Brazil) André Sá | (Brazil) André Ghem (Italy) Simone Vagnozzi | 6–4, 6–3 |
| Blumenau | 2009 | (Brazil) Marcelo Demoliner (Brazil) Rodrigo Guidolin | (Brazil) Rogério Dutra da Silva (Brazil) Júlio Silva | 7–5, 4–6, 13–11 |
| Florianópolis | 2008 | (Chile) Adrián García (Argentina) Leonardo Mayer | (Brazil) Thomaz Bellucci (Brazil) Bruno Soares | 6–2, 6–0 |
| Florianópolis | 2007 | (Uruguay) Pablo Cuevas (Argentina) Horacio Zeballos | (Brazil) André Miele (Brazil) João Souza | 6–4, 6–4 |
| Florianópolis | 2006 | (Argentina) Máximo González (Argentina) Sergio Roitman | (Brazil) Thiago Alves (Brazil) Júlio Silva | 6–2, 3–6, 10–5 |
