= Marcelo Demoliner =

Brazilian professional tennis player

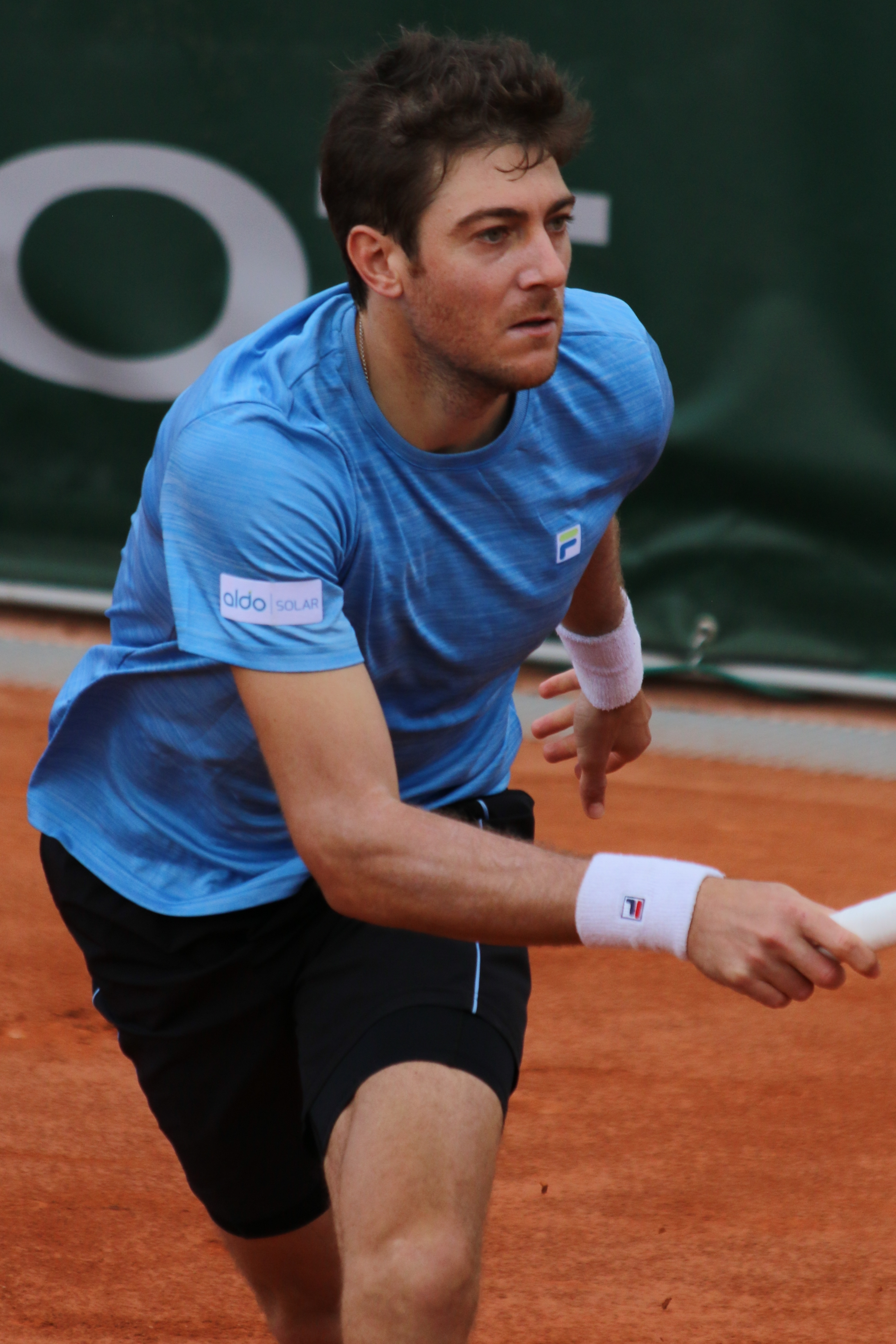
- Demoliner at 2019 French Open
- Country (sports): Brazil
- Residence: Rio de Janeiro, Brazil
- Born: 18 January 1989 (age 37) Caxias do Sul, Brazil
- Height: 1.93 m (6 ft 4 in)
- Turned pro: 2006
- Plays: Right-handed
- Coach: Duda Matos; João Zwetsch
- Prize money: US$ 1,623,838

Singles
- Career record: 1–2
- Career titles: 0
- Highest ranking: No. 232 (21 September 2009)

Grand Slam singles results
- Australian Open: Q1 (2013)
- Wimbledon: Q2 (2013)

Doubles
- Career record: 170–200
- Career titles: 5
- Highest ranking: No. 34 (27 November 2017)
- Current ranking: No. 59 (14 September 2026)

Grand Slam doubles results
- Australian Open: 3R (2017, 2019)
- French Open: QF (2026)
- Wimbledon: 3R (2015, 2017, 2019, 2025)
- US Open: QF (2022)

Other doubles tournaments
- Olympic Games: 1R (2021)

Grand Slam mixed doubles results
- Australian Open: SF (2018)
- French Open: QF (2017, 2018)
- Wimbledon: SF (2017)
- US Open: QF (2021)
Medal record
Men's tennis
Representing Brazil
Pan American Games
Gold medal – first place	2023 Santiago	Doubles
Silver medal – second place	2023 Santiago	Mixed doubles
- Last updated on: 14 September 2026.

Marcelo Fedrizzi Demoliner (born 18 January 1989) is a Brazilian professional tennis player, who specializes in doubles. He reached a career-high doubles ranking of world No. 34 in November 2017. Demoliner has won five doubles titles.

He won his first title at the ATP 250 Antalya Open with Santiago González in June 2018, after having reached six finals at that level. He was runner-up at the ATP 500 Vienna in 2018 and Saint Petersburg in 2020.

Alongside Maria José Martinez Sanchez, he was a mixed doubles semifinalist in 2017 Wimbledon Championships and 2018 Australian Open.

== Career ==
=== 2006-2007: Turned Professional ===
Demoliner turned professional in 2006, playing smaller tournaments (Futures).

In 2007, he played his first Challenger. At this time, he was considered one of the promises of the sport in Brazil.

=== 2009-2012: First singles Challenger title, new partnership with Souza ===
In 2009, he entered the top 300 and won his first Challenger title in Blumenau. In 2011, again achieved good results in Blumenau Challenger, being runner-up. These were the two best results in singles thus far.

In doubles, Demoliner won two Challenger titles in 2009. However, only in 2012 formed a fixed partnership with João Souza, aiming to become an ATP-level doubles player. The partnership began in September and quickly obtained good results: five Challenger finals in a row, with two runners-up (Cali and Quito) and three titles (Campinas, Rio de Janeiro, and Porto Alegre). With this, Demoliner was approaching the top 100 at doubles.

=== 2013-2016: Top 100 & Major debut and two third rounds, doping suspension ===
In February 2013, Demoliner first entered the doubles top 100. In the first half of 2013, he won four Challengers in doubles. In June 2013, he participated for the first time in a Grand Slam at the 2013 Wimbledon Championships with compatriot André Sá, losing in the first round to the Bryan brothers, the No. 1 duo in the world. He also reached the semifinals of the ATP 250 Newport in July.

In 2014 he had, as campaign highlights, the semifinals of the ATP 250 Zagreb and two Challenger titles in Quito and Cordoba.

In 2015, he won two more Challengers (Cali and Ilkley). He reached the third round at Wimbledon, the second round of the US Open, and began to participate in more ATP tournaments.

In 2016, Demoliner was given a doping ban for testing positive for a prohibited substance between February and April. Following his return, his best results were two runner-ups at the ATP 250 in Quito and Bastad, a semifinal of the ATP 500 Rio de Janeiro, and a third round at the 2016 US Open.

=== 2017: Mixed doubles semifinal at Wimbledon, four finals, top 35 ===
In 2017, he reached the third round of the Australian Open and got three more runner-ups on the ATP 250 level in São Paulo, Lyon and Chengdu alongside Marcus Daniell. He was also runner-up at the ATP 500 in Vienna alongside Sam Querrey for the very first time at this level.

=== 2018: First ATP title, second mixed doubles semifinal ===
In 2018, he won his first ATP 250 title in Antalya with Santiago González. He also was runner-up at ATP 250 Antwerp, and won a Challenger title in Barcelona.

=== 2019: 100th career win, partnership with Middlekoop ===
In 2019, he won a Challenger title in Canberra alongside Frenchman Hugo Nys, two ATP 250 runner-ups in Munich and Zhuhai, alongside Indian Divij Sharan and Dutch Matwé Middelkoop respectively and won one ATP 250 title in Moscow alongside Middelkoop, completing his career win number 100. At the end of the Russian event, Demoliner ended his season aiming for rest and training for 2020 Australian Open alongside Middelkoop in January.

=== 2020: One title, one final ===
In 2020, he reached two finals alongside Middlekoop. In the South American swing (clay), they won the Córdoba Open defeating Argentines Leonardo Mayer and Andrés Molteni in the final. In October, they were runner-ups St. Petersburg Open losing to the number 2 seeded pair, Austrian Jürgen Melzer and Frenchman Édouard Roger-Vasselin.

=== 2021: Fourth ATP title, Hiatus due to surgery ===
In 2021, Demoliner and his current partner Santiago González took the first dose of a COVID-19 vaccine at the 2021 Serbia Open. In grass season, he won his fourth ATP 250 title at Stuttgart Open defeating Uruguayan Ariel Behar and Gonzalo Escobar from Ecuador. On 31 October, Demoliner announced the end of his season due to a knee injury and soon afterward had a successful surgery.

=== 2022: First Grand Slam quarterfinal with Sousa ===
In 2022, Demoliner was expected to return at 2022 Chile Open after four months without playing but withdrew before the tournament. Nine months after his surgery, Demoliner returned at an ATP Challenger Tour event Brawo Open in Germany where partnering Jan-Lennard Struff he won the title.

Using a protected ranking at the US Open, he reached a Grand Slam quarterfinal for the first time in his career with his partner Joao Sousa, having never passed the third round at a Major.

=== 2023: Return to top 100, Fifth title with Vavassori ===
Ranked No. 98 at the 2023 Grand Prix Hassan II he won his fifth doubles title with Andrea Vavassori. As a result he moved back into the top 75 of the doubles rankings. This year, Demoliner also made the semifinals at the ATP 500 in Halle, was runner-up at the ATP 250 in Gstaad and made the semifinals at the ATP 250 in Winston-Salem and Buenos Aires.

At the 2023 Pan American Games, playing in doubles, Demoliner and Gustavo Heide overcame the hostile Chilean crowd and took gold. Both having to play two finals on the same day, after winning gold in men's and women's doubles, Demoliner and Luisa Stefani went to the mixed doubles final and obtained another medal, now a silver.

== ATP Tour career finals ==
=== Doubles: 17 (5 titles, 12 runner-ups) ===
Legend (doubles) Grand Slam tournaments (0–0) ATP Tour Finals (0–0) ATP Tour Masters 1000 (0–0) ATP Tour 500 Series (0–2) ATP Tour 250 Series (5–10)	Finals by surface Hard (1–5) Clay (2–7) Grass (2–0)	Finals by setting Outdoor (4–9) Indoor (1–3)

Result	W–L	Date	Tournament	Tier	Surface	Partner	Opponents	Score
Loss	0–1	Feb 2016	Ecuador Open, Ecuador	250 Series	Clay	(Brazil) Thomaz Bellucci	(Spain) Pablo Carreño Busta (Argentina) Guillermo Durán	5–7, 4–6
Loss	0–2	Jul 2016	Swedish Open, Sweden	250 Series	Clay	(New Zealand) Marcus Daniell	(Spain) Marcel Granollers (Spain) David Marrero	2–6, 3–6
Loss	0–3	Mar 2017	Brasil Open, Brazil	250 Series	Clay	(New Zealand) Marcus Daniell	(Brazil) Rogério Dutra Silva (Brazil) André Sá	6–7^{(5–7)}, 7–5, [7–10]
Loss	0–4	May 2017	Lyon Open, France	250 Series	Clay	(New Zealand) Marcus Daniell	(Argentina) Andrés Molteni (Canada) Adil Shamasdin	3–6, 6–3, [5–10]
Loss	0–5	Oct 2017	Chengdu Open, China	250 Series	Hard	(New Zealand) Marcus Daniell	(Israel) Jonathan Erlich (Pakistan) Aisam-ul-Haq Qureshi	3–6, 6–7^{(3–7)}
Loss	0–6	Oct 2017	Vienna Open, Austria	500 Series	Hard (i)	(United States) Sam Querrey	(India) Rohan Bopanna (Uruguay) Pablo Cuevas	6–7^{(7–9)}, 7–6^{(7–4)}, [9–11]
Win	1–6	Jun 2018	Antalya Open, Turkey	250 Series	Grass	(Mexico) Santiago González	(Netherlands) Sander Arends (Netherlands) Matwé Middelkoop	7–5, 6–7^{(6–8)}, [10–8]
Loss	1–7	Oct 2018	European Open, Belgium	250 Series	Hard (i)	(Mexico) Santiago González	(France) Nicolas Mahut (France) Édouard Roger-Vasselin	4–6, 5–7
Loss	1–8	May 2019	Bavarian Championships, Germany	250 Series	Clay	(India) Divij Sharan	(Denmark) Frederik Nielsen (Germany) Tim Pütz	4–6, 2–6
Loss	1–9	Sep 2019	Zhuhai Championships, China	250 Series	Hard	(Netherlands) Matwé Middelkoop	(Belgium) Sander Gillé (Belgium) Joran Vliegen	6–7^{(2–7)}, 6–7^{(4–7)}
Win	2–9	Oct 2019	Kremlin Cup, Russia	250 Series	Hard (i)	(Netherlands) Matwé Middelkoop	(Italy) Simone Bolelli (Argentina) Andrés Molteni	6–1, 6–2
Win	3–9	Feb 2020	Córdoba Open, Argentina	250 Series	Clay	(Netherlands) Matwé Middelkoop	(Argentina) Leonardo Mayer (Argentina) Andrés Molteni	6–3, 7–6^{(7–4)}
Loss	3–10	Oct 2020	St. Petersburg Open, Russia	500 Series	Hard (i)	(Netherlands) Matwé Middelkoop	(Austria) Jürgen Melzer (France) Édouard Roger-Vasselin	2–6, 6–7^{(4–7)}
Win	4–10	Jun 2021	Stuttgart Open, Germany	250 Series	Grass	(Mexico) Santiago González	(Uruguay) Ariel Behar (Ecuador) Gonzalo Escobar	4–6, 6–3, [10–8]
Win	5–10	Apr 2023	Grand Prix Hassan II, Morocco	250 Series	Clay	(Italy) Andrea Vavassori	(Austria) Alexander Erler (Austria) Lucas Miedler	6–4, 3–6, [12–10]
Loss	5–11	Jul 2023	Swiss Open Gstaad, Switzerland	250 Series	Clay	(Netherlands) Matwé Middelkoop	(Switzerland) Dominic Stricker (Switzerland) Stan Wawrinka	6-7^{(8–10)}, 2–6
Loss	5–12	Jul 2026	Swiss Open Gstaad, Switzerland	250 Series	Clay	(United States) Robert Galloway	(Austria) Lucas Miedler (Australia) Marc Polmans	4–6, 3–6

== ATP Challenger and Futures/ITF World Tennis Tour finals ==
=== Singles: 15 (7–8) ===
Legend (singles) ATP Challenger Tour (1–1) Futures/ITF World Tennis Tour (6–7)	Finals by surface Hard (2–0) Clay (5–8) Grass (0–0) Carpet (0–0)

Result	W–L	Date	Tournament	Tier	Surface	Opponent	Score
Loss	0–1	Nov 2007	Brazil F22, Porto Alegre	Futures	Clay	(Brazil) Ricardo Hocevar	6–1, 3–6, 4–6
Loss	0–2	Aug 2008	Brazil F13, Ribeirão Preto	Futures	Clay	(Brazil) Alexandre Bonatto	3–6, 3–6
Win	1–2	Sep 2008	Brazil F21, Aracaju	Futures	Clay (i)	(Argentina) Alejandro Kon	6–4, 7–5
Win	2–2	May 2009	Blumenau, Brazil	Challenger	Clay	(Brazil) Rogério Dutra Silva	6–1, 6–0
Loss	2–3	Jun 2009	Brazil F7, Brasília	Futures	Clay	(Brazil) Leonardo Kirche	7–6^{(7–4)}, 6–7^{(2–7)}, 4–6
Win	3–3	May 2010	Brazil F6, Caldas Novas	Futures	Hard	(Brazil) Rodrigo Guidolin	7–6^{(7–5)}, 6–4
Loss	3–4	May 2010	Brazil F7, Marília	Futures	Clay	(Brazil) Leonardo Kirche	3–6, 4–6
Win	4–4	Jul 2010	Brazil F15, Guarulhos	Futures	Clay	(Brazil) Daniel Dutra da Silva	6–7^{(4–7)}, 6–4, 6–4
Loss	4–5	Apr 2011	Blumenau, Brazil	Challenger	Clay	(Argentina) José Acasuso	2–6, 2–6
Loss	4–6	Aug 2011	Brazil F25, Fortaleza	Futures	Clay	(Brazil) Ricardo Hocevar	2–6, 6–7^{(2–7)}
Win	5–6	Feb 2012	Brazil F7, Lages	Futures	Clay	(Brazil) José Pereira	7–5, 6–4
Win	6–6	Jun 2012	Peru F3, Lima	Futures	Clay	(Argentina) Juan-Pablo Amado	7–6^{(7–3)}, 6–2
Loss	6–7	Jun 2012	Peru F4, Arequipa	Futures	Clay	(El Salvador) Marcelo Arévalo	4–6, 5–7
Win	7–7	Dec 2012	Brazil F35, Gramado	Futures	Hard	(Brazil) Pedro Zerbini	7–5, 6–3
Loss	7–8	Dec 2012	Brazil F36, Porto Alegre	Futures	Clay	(Brazil) Tiago Lopes	4–6, 2–6

=== Doubles: 76 (45–31) ===
Legend (doubles) ATP Challenger Tour (29–17) Futures/ITF World Tennis Tour (16–14)	Finals by surface Hard (8–4) Clay (35–25) Grass (2–2) Carpet (0–0)

Result	W–L	Date	Tournament	Tier	Surface	Partner	Opponents	Score
Win	1–0	Mar 2008	Spain F10, Badalona	Futures	Clay	(United Kingdom) David Rice	(Spain) David Cañudas-Fernández (Spain) Óscar Sabate-Bretos	6–3, 6–1
Win	2–0	May 2008	Brazil F4, Caldas Novas	Futures	Hard	(Brazil) André Miele	(Bolivia) Mauricio Doria-Medina (Brazil) Rodrigo-Antonio Grilli	6–4, 3–6, [10–6]
Loss	2–1	May 2008	Brazil F5, Uberlândia	Futures	Clay	(Brazil) André Miele	(Bolivia) Mauricio Doria-Medina (Brazil) Rodrigo-Antonio Grilli	6–7^{(3–7)}, 6–7^{(3–7)}
Loss	2–2	Jun 2008	Brazil F6, Brasília	Futures	Clay	(Brazil) André Miele	(Brazil) Rafael Camilo (Brazil) Rodrigo Guidolin	6–7^{(4–7)}, 6–7^{(2–7)}
Win	3–2	Jul 2008	Brazil F12, Brasília	Futures	Clay	(Brazil) André Miele	(Brazil) Tiago Lopes (Brazil) Fernando Romboli	7–5, 6–4
Loss	3–3	Aug 2008	Brazil F14, Jaú	Futures	Clay	(Brazil) Tiago Lopes	(Argentina) Guillermo Bujniewicz (Argentina) Lionel Noviski	6–7^{(0–7)}, 6–3, [8–10]
Win	4–3	Aug 2008	Brazil F16, São José do Rio Preto	Futures	Clay	(Brazil) Rodrigo-Antonio Grilli	(France) Marc Auradou (Brazil) José Nascimento	6–2, 6–4
Win	5–3	Sep 2008	Brazil F19, Fortaleza	Futures	Clay	(Brazil) Tiago Lopes	(Argentina) Juan-Pablo Amado (Argentina) Juan-Pablo Yunis	6–3, 6–2
Win	6–3	Mar 2009	Portugal F2, Lagos	Futures	Hard	(Brazil) Rodrigo Guidolin	(Bosnia and Herzegovina) Aldin Šetkić (Serbia) Aleksander Slović	6–1, 4–6, [12–10]
Loss	6–4	Mar 2009	Portugal F3, Albufeira	Futures	Hard	(Brazil) Rodrigo Guidolin	(Bosnia and Herzegovina) Aldin Šetkić (Serbia) Aleksander Slović	2–6, 4–6
Loss	6–5	May 2009	Brazil F1, Campinas	Futures	Clay	(Brazil) Rodrigo Guidolin	(Brazil) André Miele (Brazil) Fernando Romboli	6–7^{(5–7)}, 7–5, [8–10]
Win	7–5	May 2009	Blumenau, Brazil	Challenger	Clay	(Brazil) Rodrigo Guidolin	(Brazil) Júlio Silva (Brazil) Rogério Dutra Silva	7–5, 4–6, [13–11]
Loss	7–6	May 2009	Brazil F3, Uberlândia	Futures	Clay	(Brazil) Rodrigo Guidolin	(Brazil) Fernando Romboli (Brazil) Júlio Silva	1–6, 4–6
Loss	7–7	Jun 2009	Brazil F8, Divinópolis	Futures	Clay	(Brazil) Rodrigo Guidolin	(Brazil) Tiago Lopes (Brazil) Fabrício Neis	6–7^{(3–7)}, 6–7^{(3–7)}
Win	8–7	Aug 2009	Brasília, Brazil	Challenger	Hard	(Brazil) Rodrigo Guidolin	(Brazil) Ricardo Mello (Brazil) Caio Zampieri	6–4, 6–2
Loss	8–8	Jan 2010	Bucaramanga, Colombia	Challenger	Clay	(Brazil) Rodrigo Guidolin	(Spain) Pere Riba (Spain) Santiago Ventura	6–2, 6–2
Win	9–8	May 2010	Brazil F7, Marília	Futures	Clay	(Brazil) Rodrigo Guidolin	(Mexico) Luis Díaz Barriga (Mexico) Miguel Ángel Reyes-Varela	4–6, 6–1, [11–9]
Win	10–8	Jul 2010	Brazil F15, Guarulhos	Futures	Clay	(Brazil) Rodrigo Guidolin	(Brazil) Rafael Camilo (Brazil) Fabrício Neis	6–4, 6–3
Loss	10–9	Jul 2010	Brazil F16, Jundiaí	Futures	Clay	(Brazil) Rodrigo Guidolin	(Brazil) Rogério Dutra Silva (Brazil) Júlio Silva	3–6, 2–6
Win	11–9	Dec 2010	Brazil F36, Araçatuba	Futures	Clay	(Brazil) Fernando Romboli	(Brazil) Fabiano de Paula (Brazil) Daniel Dutra da Silva	6–3, 7–6^{(7–3)}
Loss	11–10	Jan 2011	Brazil F4, Recife	Futures	Clay (i)	(Brazil) Fabiano de Paula	(Peru) Iván Miranda (Brazil) Caio Zampieri	4–6, 7–5, [3–10]
Win	12–10	Jan 2011	Brazil F5, João Pessoa	Futures	Clay	(United Kingdom) Morgan Phillips	(Uruguay) Ariel Behar (Venezuela) Luis David Martínez	6–3, 7–5
Loss	12–11	Feb 2011	Brazil F6, Natal	Futures	Clay	(United Kingdom) Morgan Phillips	(Brazil) Tiago Lopes (Peru) Iván Miranda	2–6, 1–6
Loss	12–12	Aug 2011	Brazil F25, Fortaleza	Futures	Clay	(Brazil) Rafael Camilo	(Brazil) Guilherme Clezar (Brazil) Caio Zampieri	6–7^{(3–7)}, 6–2, [8–10]
Win	13–12	Oct 2011	Brazil F33, São Paulo	Futures	Clay	(Brazil) Fernando Romboli	(Brazil) Daniel Dutra da Silva (Brazil) Caio Zampieri	6–1, 4–6, [10–4]
Win	14–12	May 2012	Peru F1, Chosica	Futures	Clay	(Argentina) Renzo Olivo	(Peru) Duilio Beretta (Peru) Sergio Galdós	6–3, 7–6^{(10–8)}
Win	15–12	Jun 2012	Peru F2, Lima	Futures	Clay	(Argentina) Renzo Olivo	(Brazil) Victor Maynard (Brazil) Fernando Romboli	2–6, 7–5, [10–5]
Win	16–12	Jun 2012	Peru F4, Arequipa	Futures	Clay	(El Salvador) Marcelo Arévalo	(Argentina) Andrés Ceppo (Colombia) Felipe Mantilla	6–2, 6–2
Loss	16–13	Jun 2012	Peru F5, Trujillo	Futures	Clay	(El Salvador) Marcelo Arévalo	(Chile) Jorge Aguilar (Ecuador) Julio César Campozano	4–6, 6–3, [6–10]
Win	17–13	Jun 2012	Peru F6, Lima	Futures	Clay	(Argentina) Renzo Olivo	(Peru) Duilio Beretta (Peru) Sergio Galdós	6–4, 6–3
Win	18–13	Jul 2012	Bogotá, Colombia	Challenger	Clay	(Dominican Republic) Víctor Estrella Burgos	(Italy) Thomas Fabbiano (Italy) Riccardo Ghedin	6–4, 6–2
Loss	18–14	Sep 2012	Cali, Colombia	Challenger	Clay	(Brazil) João Souza	(Colombia) Juan Sebastián Cabal (Colombia) Robert Farah	3–6, 6–7^{(4–7)}
Win	19–14	Sep 2012	Campinas, Brazil	Challenger	Clay	(Brazil) João Souza	(Uruguay) Marcel Felder (Argentina) Máximo González	6–1, 7–5
Win	20–14	Sep 2012	Colombia F3, Cúcuta	Futures	Clay	(Chile) Guillermo Hormazábal	(Philippines) Ruben Gonzales (Australia) Chris Letcher	6–4, 3–6, [10–4]
Loss	20–15	Oct 2012	Quito, Ecuador	Challenger	Clay	(Brazil) João Souza	(Colombia) Juan Sebastián Cabal (Colombia) Carlos Salamanca	6–7^{(7–9)}, 6–7^{(4–7)}
Win	21–15	Oct 2012	Rio de Janeiro, Brazil	Challenger	Clay	(Brazil) João Souza	(Portugal) Fred Gil (Portugal) Pedro Sousa	6–2, 6–4
Win	22–15	Oct 2012	Porto Alegre, Brazil	Challenger	Clay	(Brazil) João Souza	(Germany) Simon Greul (Italy) Alessandro Motti	6–3, 3–6, [10–7]
Loss	22–16	Dec 2012	Brazil F35, Gramado	Futures	Hard	(Brazil) Caio Zampieri	(Brazil) Fabrício Neis (Brazil) Nicolas Santos	7–5, 4–6, [4–10]
Win	23–16	Jan 2013	Bucaramanga, Colombia	Challenger	Clay	(Croatia) Franko Škugor	(Peru) Sergio Galdós (Argentina) Marco Trungelliti	7–6^{(10–8)}, 6–2
Win	24–16	Mar 2013	Santiago, Chile	Challenger	Clay	(Brazil) João Souza	(Argentina) Federico Delbonis (Argentina) Diego Junqueira	7–5, 6–1
Win	25–16	Apr 2013	São Paulo, Brazil	Challenger	Clay	(Brazil) João Souza	(United States) James Cerretani (France) Pierre-Hugues Herbert	6–4, 3–6, [10–6]
Win	26–16	May 2013	Rio Quente, Brazil	Challenger	Hard	(Brazil) Fabiano de Paula	(Brazil) Ricardo Hocevar (Brazil) Leonardo Kirche	6–3, 6–4
Loss	26–17	Aug 2013	Rio de Janeiro, Brazil	Challenger	Clay	(Brazil) João Souza	(Netherlands) Thiemo de Bakker (Brazil) André Sá	3–6, 2–6
Loss	26–18	Oct 2013	São José do Rio Preto, Brazil	Challenger	Clay	(Brazil) João Souza	(Colombia) Nicolás Barrientos (Colombia) Carlos Salamanca	4–6, 4–6
Loss	26–19	Nov 2013	Lima, Peru	Challenger	Clay	(Peru) Sergio Galdós	(Argentina) Andrés Molteni (Brazil) Fernando Romboli	4–6, 4–6
Loss	26–20	Sep 2014	Colombia F5, Ibagué	Futures	Clay	(Brazil) Fabiano de Paula	(Colombia) Nicolás Barrientos (South Africa) Dean O'Brien	3–6, 7–5, [7–10]
Win	27–20	Sep 2014	Quito, Ecuador	Challenger	Clay	(Brazil) João Souza	(Peru) Duilio Beretta (Uruguay) Martín Cuevas	6–4, 6–4
Win	28–20	Oct 2014	Córdoba, Argentina	Challenger	Clay	(Chile) Nicolás Jarry	(Bolivia) Hugo Dellien (Argentina) Juan Ignacio Londero	6–3, 7–5
Loss	28–21	Nov 2014	Lima, Peru	Challenger	Clay	(Venezuela) Roberto Maytín	(Peru) Sergio Galdós (Argentina) Guido Pella	3–6, 1–6
Loss	28–22	Apr 2015	Guadalajara, Mexico	Challenger	Hard	(Mexico) Miguel Ángel Reyes-Varela	(United States) Austin Krajicek (United States) Rajeev Ram	5–7, 6–4, [6–10]
Win	29–22	May 2015	Cali, Colombia	Challenger	Clay	(Mexico) Miguel Ángel Reyes-Varela	(Ecuador) Emilio Gómez (Venezuela) Roberto Maytín	6–1, 6–2
Loss	29–23	Jun 2015	Surbiton, Great Britain	Challenger	Grass	(New Zealand) Marcus Daniell	(United Kingdom) Ken Skupski (United Kingdom) Neal Skupski	3–6, 4–6
Win	30–23	Jun 2015	Ilkley, Great Britain	Challenger	Grass	(New Zealand) Marcus Daniell	(United Kingdom) Ken Skupski (United Kingdom) Neal Skupski	7–6^{(7–3)}, 6–4
Loss	30–24	Nov 2015	Montevideo, Uruguay	Challenger	Clay	(Portugal) Gastão Elias	(Slovakia) Andrej Martin (Chile) Hans Podlipnik Castillo	4–6, 6–3, [6–10]
Loss	30–25	Jun 2016	Ilkley, Great Britain	Challenger	Grass	(Pakistan) Aisam Qureshi	(Netherlands) Wesley Koolhof (Netherlands) Matwé Middelkoop	6–7^{(5–7)}, 6–0, [8–10]
Win	31–25	Jul 2016	Todi, Italy	Challenger	Clay	(Brazil) Fabrício Neis	(Italy) Salvatore Caruso (Italy) Alessandro Giannessi	6–1, 3–6, [10–5]
Win	32–25	Mar 2017	Irving, USA	Challenger	Hard	(New Zealand) Marcus Daniell	(Austria) Oliver Marach (France) Fabrice Martin	6–3, 6–4
Win	33–25	Oct 2018	Barcelona, Spain	Challenger	Clay	(Spain) David Vega Hernández	(Australia) Rameez Junaid (Netherlands) David Pel	7–6^{(7–3)}, 6–3
Loss	33–26	Nov 2018	Buenos Aires, Argentina	Challenger	Clay	(Argentina) Andrés Molteni	(Argentina) Guido Andreozzi (Argentina) Guillermo Durán	4–6, 6–4, [3–10]
Win	34–26	Jan 2019	Canberra, Australia	Challenger	Hard	(France) Hugo Nys	(Sweden) André Göransson (Netherlands) Sem Verbeek	3–6, 6–4, [10–3]
Win	35–26	Jul 2022	Braunschweig, Germany	Challenger	Clay	(Germany) Jan-Lennard Struff	(Czech Republic) Roman Jebavý (Czech Republic) Adam Pavlásek	6–4, 7–5
Loss	35–27	Mar 2023	Sanremo, Italy	Challenger	Clay	(Serbia) Nikola Ćaćić	(Romania) Victor Vlad Cornea (Croatia) Franko Škugor	2–6, 3–6
Loss	35–28	Apr 2023	Oeiras, Portugal	Challenger	Clay	(Italy) Andrea Vavassori	(Romania) Victor Vlad Cornea (Croatia) Franko Škugor	6–7^{(2–7)}, 6–7^{(4–7)}
Loss	35–29	Nov 2023	Brasilia, Brazil	Challenger	Hard	(Brazil) Rafael Matos	(Colombia) Nicolás Barrientos (Sweden) André Göransson	6–7^{(3–7)}, 6–4, [9–11]
Win	36–29	Mar 2024	São Leopoldo, Brazil	Challenger	Clay	(Brazil) Orlando Luz	(Canada) Liam Draxl (Italy) Alexander Weis	7–5, 3–6, [10–8]
Win	37–29	Jul 2024	Amersfoort, Netherlands	Challenger	Clay	(Argentina) Guillermo Durán	(United Kingdom) Jay Clarke (United Kingdom) David Stevenson	7–6^{(7–2)}, 6–4
Win	38–29	Jul 2024	Verona, Italy	Challenger	Clay	(Argentina) Guillermo Durán	(Bulgaria) Yanaki Milev (Bulgaria) Petr Nesterov	6–7^{(6–8)}, 7–6^{(7–3)}, [15–13]
Win	39–29	Oct 2024	Mouilleron-le-Captif, France	Challenger	Hard (i)	(United States) Christian Harrison	(Denmark) August Holmgren (Denmark) Johannes Ingildsen	6–3, 7–5
Loss	39–30	Feb 2025	Piracicaba, Brazil	Challenger	Clay	(Brazil) Fernando Romboli	(Argentina) Guido Andreozzi (Brazil) Orlando Luz	7–6^{(7–4)}, 2–6, [9–11]
Win	40–30	Feb 2025	Rosario, Argentina	Challenger	Clay	(Brazil) Orlando Luz	(Argentina) Guido Andreozzi (France) Théo Arribagé	7–5, 6–3
Loss	40–31	May 2025	Oeiras, Portugal	Challenger	Clay	(Austria) David Pichler	(Germany) Andreas Mies (Spain) David Vega Hernández	4–6, 4–6
Win	41–31	Jun 2025	Birmingham, Great Britain	Challenger	Grass	(France) Sadio Doumbia	(Ecuador) Diego Hidalgo (United States) Patrik Trhac	6-4, 3-6, [10-4]
Win	42–31	Sep 2025	Braga, Portugal	Challenger	Clay	(Brazil) Orlando Luz	(Bulgaria) Alexander Donski (Serbia) Stefan Latinovic	7-5, 5-7, [10-7]
Win	43–31	Oct 2025	Valencia, Spain	Challenger	Clay	(Brazil) Orlando Luz	(Spain) Inigo Cervantes (Israel) Daniel Cukierman	6-3, 3-6, [10-5]
Win	44–31	Nov 2025	Lima, Peru	Challenger	Clay	(Brazil) Orlando Luz	(Colombia) Cristian Rodríguez (Bolivia) Federico Zeballos	2–6, 7–6^{(7–3)}, [10–8]
Win	45–31	Mar 2026	Punta Cana, Dominican Republic	Challenger	Hard	(Monaco) Romain Arneodo	(Israel) Daniel Cukierman (United States) Trey Hilderbrand	7–6^{(7–2)}, 3–6, [10–6]

== Doubles performance timeline ==
Key
W	F	SF	QF	#R	RR	Q#	DNQ	A	NH

(W) winner; (F) finalist; (SF) semifinalist; (QF) quarterfinalist; (#R) rounds 4, 3, 2, 1; (RR) round-robin stage; (Q#) qualification round; (DNQ) did not qualify; (A) absent; (NH) not held; (SR) strike rate (events won / competed); (W–L) win–loss record.
To avoid confusion and double counting, these charts are updated at the conclusion of a tournament or when the player's participation has ended.

Current through the end of 2025 US Open.

Tournament	2013	2014	2015	2016	2017	2018	2019	2020	2021	2022	2023	2024	2025	SR	W–L
Grand Slam tournaments
Australian Open	A	A	A	2R	3R	1R	3R	1R	1R	A	2R	1R	A	0 / 8	6–8
French Open	A	A	A	1R	1R	2R	2R	1R	1R	A	1R	A	1R	0 / 8	2–8
Wimbledon	1R	1R	3R	2R	3R	2R	3R	NH	1R	A	1R	A	3R	0 / 10	9–10
US Open	A	A	2R	3R	2R	2R	1R	2R	2R	QF	1R	A	1R	0 / 10	10–10
Win–loss	0–1	0–1	2–2	4–4	5–4	3–4	5–4	1–3	1–4	3–1	1–4	0–1	2–3	0 / 36	27–36
