= 2011 Prime Cup Aberto de São Paulo – Singles =

Singles
- 2011 Prime Cup Aberto de São Paulo

Final
- Champion: (Brazil) Ricardo Mello
- Runner-up: (Brazil) Rafael Camilo
- Score: 6–2, 6–1

Events
Singles	Doubles
← 2010 ·	Prime Cup Aberto de São Paulo	· 2012 →

In the singles matches of the 2011 Prime Cup Aberto de São Paulo, 1st seed Ricardo Mello successfully defended his last year's title after defeating qualifier Rafael Camilo 6–2, 6–1 in the final. It was Mello's fourth overall and third consecutive win in São Paulo.

== Seeds ==
1. (Brazil) Ricardo Mello (champion)
2. (Argentina) Horacio Zeballos (second round)
3. (Brazil) João Souza (quarterfinals)
4. (Argentina) Máximo González (first round)
5. (Brazil) Thiago Alves (first round)
6. (Brazil) Rogério Dutra da Silva (second round)
7. (Argentina) Federico del Bonis (semifinals)
8. (Chile) Paul Capdeville (first round)

== Draw ==
=== Key ===
- Q = Qualifier
- WC = Wild card
- LL = Lucky loser
- Alt = Alternate
- ITF = ITF entry
- PR = Protected ranking
- SR = Special ranking
- SE = Special exempt
- JE = Junior exempt
- JR = Junior Accelerator Programme entrant
- CO = College Accelerator Programme entrant
- NG = Next Gen Accelerator Program entrant
- w/o = Walkover
- r = Retired
- d = Defaulted

=== Finals ===
Semifinals
1	(Brazil) Ricardo Mello	6	5	6
7	(Argentina) Federico del Bonis	4	7	4
(Spain) Adrián Menéndez	7	6^{6}	5
Q	(Brazil) Rafael Camilo	5	7	7

Final
1	(Brazil) Ricardo Mello	6	6
Q	(Brazil) Rafael Camilo	2	1

=== Top half ===
First round
1	(Brazil) R Mello	6	6
Q	(Brazil) H Cunha	1	4
(Chinese Taipei) T-h Yang	6	6
Q	(Portugal) G Elias	3	4
(Argentina) JP Brzezicki	7	6
(Portugal) J Sousa	6^{3}	2
Q	(Brazil) A Ghem	7	4	5
6	(Brazil) R Dutra da Silva	6^{7}	6	7
3	(Brazil) J Souza	4	6	6
(Italy) M Trevisan	6	3	1
(Ecuador) G Lapentti	7	6
(Brazil) R Hocevar	6^{6}	4
(Italy) D Giorgini	3	6	3
(Spain) G Alcaide	6	4	6
WC	(Brazil) Tiago Lopes	5	5
7	(Argentina) F del Bonis	7	7

Second round
1	(Brazil) R Mello	3	6	7
(Chinese Taipei) T-h Yang	6	4	6^{4}
(Argentina) JP Brzezicki	6	7
6	(Brazil) R Dutra da Silva	4	6^{2}
3	(Brazil) J Souza	6	6
(Ecuador) G Lapentti	1	4
(Spain) G Alcaide	3	6	6^{5}
7	(Argentina) F del Bonis	6	3	7

Quarterfinals
1	(Brazil) R Mello	6	6
(Argentina) JP Brzezicki	2	0
3	(Brazil) J Souza	6^{5}	7	4
7	(Argentina) F del Bonis	7	5	6

Semifinals
1	(Brazil) R Mello	6	5	6
7	(Argentina) F del Bonis	4	7	4

=== Bottom half ===
First round
8	(Chile) P Capdeville	5	6	0
(Belarus) U Ignatik	7	3	6
(Italy) Andrea Arnaboldi	7	6
(Mexico) S González	6^{4}	3
(Argentina) A Molteni	1	7	6
WC	(Sweden) Christian Lindell	6	6^{5}	2
(Spain) A Menéndez	6	3	6
4	(Argentina) M González	4	6	4
5	(Brazil) T Alves	6^{3}	4
WC	(Brazil) F Romboli	7	6
(Brazil) C Zampieri	5	6	0
(Italy) T Fabbiano	7	1	6
WC	(Brazil) D Dutra da Silva	6	6^{6}	2^{r}
Q	(Brazil) Rafael Camilo	3	7	3
(Brazil) J Silva	5	4
2	(Argentina) H Zeballos	7	6

Second round
(Belarus) U Ignatik	7	6^{4}	6
(Italy) Andrea Arnaboldi	6^{5}	7	4
(Argentina) A Molteni	1	2
(Spain) A Menéndez	6	6
WC	(Brazil) F Romboli	6	1	4
(Italy) T Fabbiano	3	6	6
Q	(Brazil) Rafael Camilo	7	3	7
2	(Argentina) H Zeballos	6^{5}	6	6^{7}

Quarterfinals
(Belarus) U Ignatik	6^{5}	6^{1}
(Spain) A Menéndez	7	7
(Italy) T Fabbiano	4	2
Q	(Brazil) Rafael Camilo	6	6

Semifinals
(Spain) A Menéndez	7	6^{6}	5
Q	(Brazil) Rafael Camilo	5	7	7
