= 2009 Aberto de Brasília – Doubles =

Doubles
- 2009 Aberto de Brasília

Final
- Champions: (Brazil) Marcelo Demoliner (Brazil) Rodrigo Guidolin
- Runners-up: (Brazil) Ricardo Mello (Brazil) Caio Zampieri
- Score: 6–4, 6–2

Events
Singles	Doubles
← 2008 ·	Aberto de Brasília	· 2010 →

Marcelo Demoliner and Rodrigo Guidolin defeated 6–4, 6–2 their compatriots Ricardo Mello and Caio Zampieri in the final.

== Seeds ==
1. (Brazil) Rogério Dutra da Silva / (Brazil) Júlio Silva (quarterfinals)
2. (Brazil) Ricardo Hocevar / (Brazil) André Miele (quarterfinals)
3. (Dominican Republic) Víctor Estrella / (Brazil) João Souza (first round)
4. (Brazil) Márcio Torres / (South Africa) Izak van der Merwe (first round)

== Draw ==
=== Key ===
- Q = Qualifier
- WC = Wild card
- LL = Lucky loser
- Alt = Alternate
- SE = Special exempt
- PR = Protected ranking
- ITF = ITF entry
- JE = Junior exempt
- w/o = Walkover
- r = Retired
- d = Defaulted
- SR = Special ranking

=== Draw ===
First round
1	(Brazil) R Dutra da Silva (Brazil) J Silva	6	3	[10]
(Uruguay) A Behar (Uruguay) M Felder	2	6	[5]
(Argentina) J-P Amado (Brazil) A Bonatto	6^{0}	4
(Brazil) R Mello (Brazil) C Zampieri	7	6
4	(Brazil) M Torres (South Africa) I van der Merwe	6	6^{8}	[3]
(Argentina) A Fabbri (Argentina) G Pella	3	7	[10]
(Chile) J Aguilar (France) F Martin	7	6
(Denmark) K Pless (United Kingdom) J Ward	6^{5}	1
(Brazil) E Gomes (Brazil) D Silva	6	6
WC	(Brazil) J Pereira (Argentina) M Zabaleta	2	3
(Argentina) JI Chela (Argentina) M Hood	2	7	[10]
3	(Dominican Republic) V Estrella (Brazil) J Souza	6	5	[6]
(South Africa) R Klaasen (India) A Singh	4	6	[5]
(Brazil) M Demoliner (Brazil) R Guidolin	6	3	[10]
(Russia) N Nesterov (India) V Vardhan	2	6^{1}
2	(Brazil) R Hocevar (Brazil) A Miele	6	7

Quarterfinals
1	(Brazil) R Dutra da Silva (Brazil) J Silva	4	6	[6]
(Brazil) R Mello (Brazil) C Zampieri	6	3	[10]
(Argentina) A Fabbri (Argentina) G Pella	2	6	[10]
(Chile) J Aguilar (France) F Martin	6	3	[8]
(Brazil) E Gomes (Brazil) D Silva	4	2
(Argentina) JI Chela (Argentina) M Hood	6	6
(Brazil) M Demoliner (Brazil) R Guidolin	6	6
2	(Brazil) R Hocevar (Brazil) A Miele	2	4

Semifinals
(Brazil) R Mello (Brazil) C Zampieri	3	7	[10]
(Argentina) A Fabbri (Argentina) G Pella	6	5	[7]
(Argentina) JI Chela (Argentina) M Hood	4	2
(Brazil) M Demoliner (Brazil) R Guidolin	6	6

Finals
(Brazil) R Mello (Brazil) C Zampieri	4	2
(Brazil) M Demoliner (Brazil) R Guidolin	6	6
