= 2013 Aberto de São Paulo – Singles =

Singles
- 2013 Aberto de São Paulo

Final
- Champion: (Argentina) Horacio Zeballos
- Runner-up: (Brazil) Rogério Dutra da Silva
- Score: 7–6^{(7–5)}, 6–2

Events
Singles	Doubles
← 2012 ·	Aberto de São Paulo	· 2014 →

Thiago Alves is the defending champion but lost in the quarterfinals to Gastão Elias.
Horacio Zeballos defeated Rogério Dutra da Silva 7–6^{(7–5)}, 6–2 in the final to win the title.

== Seeds ==
1. (Argentina) Horacio Zeballos (champion)
2. (Argentina) Martín Alund (quarterfinals)
3. (Brazil) Rogério Dutra da Silva (final)
4. (Brazil) Thiago Alves (quarterfinals)
5. (Argentina) Federico Delbonis (second round)
6. (Portugal) Gastão Elias (semifinals)
7. (Brazil) João Souza (semifinals)
8. (Argentina) Guido Andreozzi (quarterfinals)

== Draw ==
=== Key ===
- Q = Qualifier
- WC = Wild card
- LL = Lucky loser
- Alt = Alternate
- SE = Special exempt
- PR = Protected ranking
- ITF = ITF entry
- JE = Junior exempt
- w/o = Walkover
- r = Retired
- d = Defaulted
- SR = Special ranking

=== Finals ===
Semifinals
1	(Argentina) Horacio Zeballos	6	4	7
6	(Portugal) Gastão Elias	3	6	5
3	(Brazil) Rogério Dutra da Silva	7	6^{6}	7^{7}
7	(Brazil) João Souza	5	7^{8}	6^{5}

Final
1	(Argentina) Horacio Zeballos	7^{7}	6
3	(Brazil) Rogério Dutra da Silva	6^{5}	2

=== Top half ===
First round
1	(Argentina) H Zeballos	7	7^{7}
Q	(United States) A Krajicek	5	6^{5}
WC	(Brazil) Tiago Lopes	5	2
Q	(Brazil) A Ghem	7	6
(Brazil) L Kirche	3	6	4
Q	(Croatia) F Škugor	6	3	6
WC	(Brazil) Rafael Camilo	1	2
8	(Argentina) G Andreozzi	6	6
4	(Brazil) T Alves	7^{8}	4	4
(Colombia) A González	6^{6}	6	0^{r}
(Brazil) M Demoliner	6	6
(Argentina) D Schwartzman	2	3
WC	(Brazil) T Monteiro	4	4
(Brazil) G Clezar	6	6
(Argentina) F Bagnis	5	1
6	(Portugal) G Elias	7	6

Second round
1	(Argentina) H Zeballos	7^{7}	4	6
Q	(Brazil) A Ghem	6^{2}	6	3
Q	(Croatia) F Škugor	7^{9}	2	6^{4}
8	(Argentina) G Andreozzi	6^{7}	6	7^{7}
4	(Brazil) T Alves	4	6	6
(Brazil) M Demoliner	6	3	1
(Brazil) G Clezar	6	2	3
6	(Portugal) G Elias	4	6	6

Quarterfinals
1	(Argentina) H Zeballos	7^{7}	4	6
8	(Argentina) G Andreozzi	6^{4}	6	2
4	(Brazil) T Alves	4	3
6	(Portugal) G Elias	6	6

Semifinals
1	(Argentina) H Zeballos	6	4	7
6	(Portugal) G Elias	3	6	5

=== Bottom half ===
First round
5	(Argentina) F Delbonis	6	6
(Brazil) R Hocevar	3	1
(Argentina) R Olivo	2	0
(Ecuador) JC Campozano	6	6
(Chile) J Aguilar	5	3
Q	(United States) D Britton	7	6
(South Africa) R de Voest	6^{6}	4
3	(Brazil) R Dutra da Silva	7^{8}	6
7	(Brazil) J Souza	6	7
WC	(Brazil) D Dutra da Silva	1	5
(Portugal) P Sousa	4	6	6
(Argentina) M Trungelliti	6	4	3
(Argentina) Maximiliano Estévez	5	1
(Brazil) R Mello	7	6
(Brazil) F de Paula	3	4
2	(Argentina) M Alund	6	6

Second round
5	(Argentina) F Delbonis	3	7^{7}	3
(Ecuador) JC Campozano	6	6^{5}	6
Q	(United States) D Britton	6^{5}	6^{5}
3	(Brazil) R Dutra da Silva	7^{7}	7^{7}
7	(Brazil) J Souza	6	6
(Portugal) P Sousa	3	2
(Brazil) R Mello	6	3	6^{3}
2	(Argentina) M Alund	3	6	7^{7}

Quarterfinals
(Ecuador) JC Campozano	4	1
3	(Brazil) R Dutra da Silva	6	6
7	(Brazil) J Souza	6	6
2	(Argentina) M Alund	4	4

Semifinals
3	(Brazil) R Dutra da Silva	7	6^{6}	7^{7}
7	(Brazil) J Souza	5	7^{8}	6^{5}
