= 2009 Prime Cup Aberto de São Paulo – Doubles =

Doubles
- 2009 Prime Cup Aberto de São Paulo

Final
- Champions: (Argentina) Carlos Berlocq (Argentina) Leonardo Mayer
- Runners-up: (Argentina) Mariano Hood (Argentina) Horacio Zeballos
- Score: 7–6(1), 6–3

Events
| Singles | Doubles |
| ← 2008 · | Prime Cup Aberto de São Paulo | · 2010 → |

Jamie Delgado and Bruno Soares were the defending champions; however, they chose to not participate this year.
Carlos Berlocq and Leonardo Mayer won in the final 7–6(1), 6–3, against Mariano Hood and Horacio Zeballos.

== Seeds ==
1. (Sweden) Johan Brunström / (Netherlands Antilles) Jean-Julien Rojer (first round)
2. (Argentina) Brian Dabul / (Argentina) Sergio Roitman (first round)
3. (Thailand) Sanchai Ratiwatana / (Thailand) Sonchat Ratiwatana (quarterfinals)
4. (Argentina) Mariano Hood / (Argentina) Horacio Zeballos (finalists)

== Draw ==
Key

- Q = Qualifier
- WC = Wild card
- LL = Lucky loser
- Alt = Alternate
- ITF = ITF entry
- PR = Protected ranking
- SR = Special ranking
- SE = Special exempt
- JE = Junior exempt
- JR = Junior Accelerator Programme entrant
- CO = College Accelerator Programme entrant
- NG = Next Gen Accelerator Program entrant
- w/o = Walkover
- r = Retired
- d = Defaulted

=== Draw ===
First round
1 | (Sweden) J Brunström (Netherlands Antilles) J-J Rojer | 6^{5} | 6 | [7]
(Paraguay) R Delgado (Argentina) S Prieto | 7 | 3 | [10]
(Argentina) C Berlocq (Argentina) L Mayer | 6 | 6
(Germany) B Becker (Chile) P Capdeville | 4 | 2
3 | (Thailand) Sa Ratiwatana (Argentina) So Ratiwatana | 6 | 6
(Brazil) R Hocevar (Denmark) K Pless | 3 | 4
WC | (Brazil) R Mello (Brazil) C Zampieri | 6 | 4 | [8]
WC | (Brazil) F Ferreiro (Brazil) F Saretta | 3 | 6 | [10]
WC | (Montenegro) D Danilović (Brazil) N Santos | 6 | 6^{10} | [8]
(Argentina) JP Brzezicki (Germany) F Moser | 2 | 7 | [10]
(Brazil) T Alves (Brazil) M Torres | 5 | 0
4 | (Argentina) M Hood (Argentina) H Zeballos | 7 | 6
(Argentina) S Decoud (Colombia) S Giraldo | 5 | 3
ALT | (Israel) H Levy (Israel) N Okun | 7 | 6
(Brazil) M Daniel (Mexico) S González | 6 | 6
2 | (Argentina) B Dabul (Argentina) S Roitman | 3 | 2

Quarterfinals
(Paraguay) R Delgado (Argentina) S Prieto | 5 | 6 | [5]
(Argentina) C Berlocq (Argentina) L Mayer | 7 | 4 | [10]
3 | (Thailand) Sa Ratiwatana (Argentina) So Ratiwatana | 5 | 6 | [8]
WC | (Brazil) F Ferreiro (Brazil) F Saretta | 7 | 4 | [10]
(Argentina) JP Brzezicki (Germany) F Moser | 5 | 2
4 | (Argentina) M Hood (Argentina) H Zeballos | 7 | 6
ALT | (Israel) H Levy (Israel) N Okun
(Brazil) M Daniel (Mexico) S González | w/o

Semifinals
(Argentina) C Berlocq (Argentina) L Mayer | 7 | 6
WC | (Brazil) F Ferreiro (Brazil) F Saretta | 6^{3} | 4
4 | (Argentina) M Hood (Argentina) H Zeballos | 6 | 6
ALT | (Israel) H Levy (Israel) N Okun | 3 | 4

Finals
(Argentina) C Berlocq (Argentina) L Mayer | 7 | 6
4 | (Argentina) M Hood (Argentina) H Zeballos | 6^{1} | 3
