= 2011 Prime Cup Aberto de São Paulo =

- Date: 3–9 January
- Edition: 11th
- Location: São Paulo, Brazil

Champions

Singles
- (Brazil) Ricardo Mello

Doubles
- (Brazil) Franco Ferreiro / (Brazil) André Sá
← 2010 ·	Aberto de São Paulo	· 2012 →

The 2011 Aberto de São Paulo was a professional tennis tournament played on hard courts. It was the eleventh edition of the tournament which was part of the 2011 ATP Challenger Tour. It took place in São Paulo, Brazil between 3 and 9 January 2011.

== Singles main-draw entrants ==
=== Seeds ===
Country	Player	Rank^{1}	Seed
BRA	Ricardo Mello	76	1
ARG	Horacio Zeballos	110	2
BRA	João Souza	111	3
ARG	Máximo González	141	4
BRA	Thiago Alves	150	5
BRA	Rogério Dutra da Silva	158	6
ARG	Federico Delbonis	160	7
CHI	Paul Capdeville	165	8

- Rankings are as of December 27, 2010.

=== Other entrants ===
The following players received wildcards into the singles main draw:

- (Brazil) Daniel Dutra da Silva
- (Sweden) Christian Lindell
- (Brazil) Tiago Lopes
- (Brazil) Fernando Romboli

The following players received entry from the qualifying draw:

- (Brazil) Rafael Camilo
- (Brazil) Henrique Cunha
- (Portugal) Gastão Elias
- (Brazil) André Ghem

== Champions ==
=== Singles ===
(Brazil) Ricardo Mello def. (Brazil) Rafael Camilo, 6–2, 6–1

=== Doubles ===
(Brazil) Franco Ferreiro / (Brazil) André Sá def. (Mexico) Santiago González / (Argentina) Horacio Zeballos, 7–5, 7–6(12)
