= 2009 Aberto de Brasília – Singles =

Singles
- 2009 Aberto de Brasília

Final
- Champion: (Brazil) Ricardo Mello
- Runner-up: (Argentina) Juan Ignacio Chela
- Score: 7–6(2), 6–4

Events
Singles	Doubles
← 2008 ·	Aberto de Brasília	· 2010 →

Ricardo Mello won in the final 7–6(2), 6–4, against Juan Ignacio Chela.

== Seeds ==
1. (Chile) Nicolás Massú (quarterfinals)
2. (Brazil) Thiago Alves (first round)
3. (Argentina) Horacio Zeballos (semifinals, retired)
4. (Argentina) Juan Ignacio Chela (final)
5. (Argentina) ~~Eduardo Schwank~~ (withdrew)
6. (Brazil) Ricardo Hocevar (second round)
7. (United Kingdom) Joshua Goodall (first round, retired)
8. (Ecuador) Giovanni Lapentti (quarterfinals)

== Draw ==
=== Key ===
- Q = Qualifier
- WC = Wild card
- LL = Lucky loser
- Alt = Alternate
- ITF = ITF entry
- PR = Protected ranking
- SR = Special ranking
- SE = Special exempt
- JE = Junior exempt
- JR = Junior Accelerator Programme entrant
- CO = College Accelerator Programme entrant
- NG = Next Gen Accelerator Program entrant
- w/o = Walkover
- r = Retired
- d = Defaulted

=== Final four ===
Semifinals
1	(Chile) Nicolás Massú	3	6	4
4/WC	(Argentina) Juan Ignacio Chela	6	3	6
3	(Argentina) Horacio Zeballos	6^{6}	6	0^{r}
(Brazil) Ricardo Mello	7	3	4

Final
4/WC	(Argentina) Juan Ignacio Chela	6^{2}	4
(Brazil) Ricardo Mello	7	6

=== Top half ===
First round
1	(Chile) N Massú	6	6
Q	(Peru) I Miranda	3	4
WC	(Brazil) E Ribeiro Neto	6	6
(South Africa) I van der Merwe	4	4
(Australia) S Groth	3	4
Q	(New Zealand) D King-Turner	6	6
(Brazil) E Gomes	6	5	2
6	(Brazil) R Hocevar	3	7	6
4/WC	(Argentina) JI Chela	6	6
Q	(Brazil) R Guidolin	2	0
(South Africa) R Klaasen	3
(Denmark) K Pless	2	r
(Chile) J Aguilar	7	5	7
(Brazil) D Silva	6^{1}	7	6^{4}
(Argentina) A Fabbri	5	6	3
8	(Ecuador) G Lapentti	7	3	6

Second round
1	(Chile) N Massú	6	6
WC	(Brazil) E Ribeiro Neto	4	2
Q	(New Zealand) D King-Turner	6	6^{5}	6
6	(Brazil) R Hocevar	3	7	3
4/WC	(Argentina) JI Chela	6
(South Africa) R Klaasen	3	r
(Chile) J Aguilar	5	3
8	(Ecuador) G Lapentti	7	6

Quarterfinals
1	(Chile) N Massú	6	7
Q	(New Zealand) D King-Turner	2	5
4/WC	(Argentina) JI Chela	6	7
8	(Ecuador) G Lapentti	1	5

Semifinals
1	(Chile) N Massú	3	6	4
4/WC	(Argentina) JI Chela	6	3	6

=== Bottom half ===
First round
7	(United Kingdom) J Goodall	4	0	r
(Uruguay) M Felder	6	2
Q	(France) F Martin	6	3	6^{6}
(Dominican Republic) V Estrella	3	6	7
WC	(Argentina) M Zabaleta	3	6^{12}
(Brazil) R Dutra da Silva	6	7
WC	(Brazil) J Pereira	6^{4}	6	1
3	(Argentina) H Zeballos	7	4	6
LL	(Brazil) A Bonatto	6	7
(United Kingdom) J Ward	3	6^{2}
(Argentina) J-P Amado	3	2
(Brazil) R Mello	6	6
(Brazil) J Souza	7	6
(Brazil) M Demoliner	6^{2}	3
(Brazil) C Zampieri	6^{5}	6	3
2	(Brazil) T Alves	7	3	6

Second round
(Uruguay) M Felder	7	7
(Dominican Republic) V Estrella	6^{6}	6^{1}
(Brazil) R Dutra da Silva	7	3	4
3	(Argentina) H Zeballos	6^{2}	6	6
LL	(Brazil) A Bonatto	3	5
(Brazil) R Mello	6	7
(Brazil) J Souza	5	7	7
2	(Brazil) T Alves	7	6^{5}	6^{5}

Quarterfinals
(Uruguay) M Felder	1	2
3	(Argentina) H Zeballos	6	6
(Brazil) R Mello
(Brazil) J Souza	w/o

Semifinals
3	(Argentina) H Zeballos	6^{6}	6	0^{r}
(Brazil) R Mello	7	3	4
