= 2009 Prime Cup Aberto de São Paulo – Singles =

Singles
- 2009 Prime Cup Aberto de São Paulo

Final
- Champion: (Brazil) Ricardo Mello
- Runner-up: (Chile) Paul Capdeville
- Score: 6–2, 6–4

Events
Singles	Doubles
← 2008 ·	Prime Cup Aberto de São Paulo	· 2010 →

Thiago Alves was the defending champion, but he lost to Horacio Zeballos in the quarterfinals.

Ricardo Mello defeated 6–2, 6–4 Paul Capdeville in the final.

== Seeds ==
1. (Brazil) Marcos Daniel (second round, withdrew)
2. (Argentina) Brian Dabul (first round)
3. (Chile) Paul Capdeville (final)
4. (Brazil) Thiago Alves (quarterfinals)
5. (Argentina) Leonardo Mayer (first round)
6. (Argentina) Sergio Roitman (first round)
7. (Germany) Benjamin Becker (first round)
8. (Uruguay) Pablo Cuevas (first round)

== Draw ==
=== Key ===
- Q = Qualifier
- WC = Wild card
- LL = Lucky loser
- Alt = Alternate
- ITF = ITF entry
- PR = Protected ranking
- SR = Special ranking
- SE = Special exempt
- JE = Junior exempt
- JR = Junior Accelerator Programme entrant
- CO = College Accelerator Programme entrant
- NG = Next Gen Accelerator Program entrant
- w/o = Walkover
- r = Retired
- d = Defaulted

=== Final four ===
Semifinals
(Brazil) João Souza	7	4	2
3	(Chile) Paul Capdeville	6^{4}	6	6
(Argentina) Horacio Zeballos	3	4
(Brazil) Ricardo Mello	6	6

Final
3	(Chile) Paul Capdeville	2	4
(Brazil) Ricardo Mello	6	6

=== Top half ===
First round
1	(Brazil) M Daniel	7	3	6
(Spain) F Vicente	6^{5}	6	1
(Denmark) K Pless	4	5
(Brazil) J Souza	6	7
(Mexico) B Echagaray	6	6
(Argentina) C Berlocq	4	3
(Brazil) F Ferreiro	6	1	7
5	(Argentina) L Mayer	4	6	6^{8}
3	(Chile) P Capdeville	6	6^{7}	7
WC	(Brazil) D Silva	2	7	5
(United States) M Russell	5	6	0
(Colombia) S Giraldo	7	2	6
(Argentina) S Decoud	4	6	7
WC	(Brazil) F Saretta	6	3	6^{5}
(Argentina) JP Brzezicki	3	6	6
6	(Argentina) S Roitman	6	3	1

Second round
1	(Brazil) M Daniel	w/o
(Brazil) J Souza
(Mexico) B Echagaray	6	6
(Brazil) F Ferreiro	4	3
3	(Chile) P Capdeville	2	6	6
(Colombia) S Giraldo	6	4	3
(Argentina) S Decoud	6	6^{7}	6
(Argentina) JP Brzezicki	3	7	4

Quarterfinals
(Brazil) J Souza	6	6
(Mexico) B Echagaray	2	1
3	(Chile) P Capdeville	6	6
(Argentina) S Decoud	6^{4}	4

Semifinals
(Brazil) J Souza	7	4	2
3	(Chile) P Capdeville	6^{4}	6	6

=== Bottom half ===
First round
7	(Germany) B Becker	6^{7}	3
(Argentina) H Zeballos	7	6
Q	(Canada) F Niemeyer	4	1	r
Q	(Israel) H Levy	6	2
(Brazil) R Hocevar	7	7
WC	(Brazil) Eric Gomes	5	6^{7}
4	(Brazil) T Alves	4	7	7
Q	(Brazil) Rafael Camilo	6	6^{3}	6^{6}
8	(Uruguay) P Cuevas	2	0
(Brazil) R Mello	6	6
(Mexico) S González	1	6	6
Q	(South Africa) I van der Merwe	6	4	3
WC	(Brazil) N Santos	2	6	7
(Peru) I Miranda	6	3	5
(Brazil) R Dutra da Silva	4	6	6
2	(Argentina) B Dabul	6	3	2

Second round
(Argentina) H Zeballos	6	6
Q	(Israel) H Levy	4	4
(Brazil) R Hocevar	3	5
4	(Brazil) T Alves	6	7
(Brazil) R Mello	6	6
(Mexico) S González	4	4
WC	(Brazil) N Santos	3	3
(Brazil) R Dutra da Silva	6	6

Quarterfinals
(Argentina) H Zeballos	7	7
4	(Brazil) T Alves	6^{4}	6^{4}
(Brazil) R Mello	7	6
(Brazil) R Dutra da Silva	6^{3}	4

Semifinals
(Argentina) H Zeballos	3	4
(Brazil) R Mello	6	6
