= 2009 Prime Cup Aberto de São Paulo =

- Date: January 3 – January 10
- Edition: 9th
- Location: São Paulo, Brazil

Champions

Singles
- (Brazil) Ricardo Mello

Doubles
- (Argentina) Carlos Berlocq / (Argentina) Leonardo Mayer
- Aberto de São Paulo

The 2009 Aberto de São Paulo was a professional tennis tournament played on outdoor hard courts. It was part of the 2009 ATP Challenger Tour. It took place in São Paulo, Brazil between 5 and 11 January 2009.

== Singles main-draw entrants ==
=== Seeds ===
Country	Player	Rank^{1}	Seed
BRA	Marcos Daniel	87	1
ARG	Brian Dabul	103	2
CHI	Paul Capdeville	111	3
BRA	Thiago Alves	113	4
ARG	Leonardo Mayer	115	5
ARG	Sergio Roitman	118	6
GER	Benjamin Becker	129	7
URU	Pablo Cuevas	142	8

- Rankings are as of December 28, 2008.

=== Other entrants ===
The following players received wildcards into the singles main draw:

- (Brazil) Eric Gomes
- (Brazil) Nicolás Santos
- (Brazil) Flávio Saretta
- (Brazil) Daniel Silva

The following players received entry from the qualifying draw:

- (Brazil) Rafael Camilo
- (Israel) Harel Levy
- (Canada) Frédéric Niemeyer
- (South Africa) Izak van der Merwe

== Champions ==
=== Men's singles ===
- (Brazil) Ricardo Mello def. (Chile) Paul Capdeville, 6–2, 6–4

=== Men's doubles ===
- (Argentina) Carlos Berlocq / (Argentina) Leonardo Mayer def. (Argentina) Mariano Hood / (Argentina) Horacio Zeballos, 7–6(1), 6–3
