= 2013 Aberto de São Paulo =

- Date: 31 December 2012 – 6 January 2013
- Edition: 13th
- Draw: 32S / 16D
- Prize money: $125,000
- Surface: Hard
- Location: São Paulo, Brazil

Champions

Singles
- (Argentina) Horacio Zeballos

Doubles
- (United States) James Cerretani / (Canada) Adil Shamasdin
← 2012 ·	Aberto de São Paulo	· 2014 →

The 2013 Aberto de São Paulo was a professional tennis tournament played on hard courts. It was the 13th edition of the tournament which was part of the 2013 ATP Challenger Tour. It took place in São Paulo, Brazil between 31 December 2012 and 6 January 2013.

== Singles main-draw entrants ==
=== Seeds ===
Country	Player	Rank^{1}	Seed
ARG	Horacio Zeballos	85	1
ARG	Martín Alund	121	2
BRA	Rogério Dutra da Silva	126	3
BRA	Thiago Alves	130	4
ARG	Federico Delbonis	133	5
POR	Gastão Elias	130	6
BRA	João Souza	144	7
ARG	Guido Andreozzi	17§	8

- ^{1} Rankings are as of December 24, 2012.

=== Other entrants ===
The following players received wildcards into the singles main draw:

- (Brazil) Rafael Camilo
- (Brazil) Daniel Dutra da Silva
- (Brazil) Tiago Lopes
- (Brazil) Thiago Monteiro

The following players received entry from the qualifying draw:

- (United States) Devin Britton
- (Brazil) André Ghem
- (United States) Austin Krajicek
- (Croatia) Franko Škugor

== Doubles main-draw entrants ==
=== Seeds ===
Country	Player	Country	Player	Rank^{1}	Seed
USA	James Cerretani	CAN	Adil Shamasdin	175	1
AUS	Rameez Junaid	GER	Simon Stadler	185	2
BRA	André Ghem	BRA	João Souza	241	3
RSA	Rik de Voest	BRA	Marcelo Demoliner	247	4

- ^{1} Rankings as of December 24, 2012.

=== Other entrants ===
The following pairs received wildcards into the doubles main draw:

- (Brazil) Rafael Camilo / (Brazil) Daniel Dutra da Silva
- (Brazil) Rogério Dutra da Silva / (Brazil) Eduardo Russi
- (Brazil) Ricardo Hocevar / (Brazil) Leonardo Kirche

== Champions ==
=== Singles ===
- (Argentina) Horacio Zeballos def. (Brazil) Rogério Dutra da Silva, 7–6^{(7–5)}, 6–2

=== Doubles ===
- (United States) James Cerretani / (Canada) Adil Shamasdin def. (Argentina) Federico Delbonis / (Argentina) Renzo Olivo, 6–7^{(5–7)}, 6–1, [11–9]
