= 2011 Prime Cup Aberto de São Paulo – Doubles =

Doubles
- 2011 Prime Cup Aberto de São Paulo

Final
- Champions: (Brazil) Franco Ferreiro (Brazil) André Sá
- Runners-up: (Mexico) Santiago González (Argentina) Horacio Zeballos
- Score: 7–5, 7–6(12)

Events
Singles	Doubles
- Prime Cup Aberto de São Paulo

Brian Dabul and Sebastián Prieto were the defending champions but decided not to participate.
Franco Ferreiro and André Sá clinched their first title of this year (five titles in the 2010 season). They defeated Santiago González and Horacio Zeballos 7–5, 7–6(12) in the final.

== Seeds ==
1. (Mexico) Santiago González / (Argentina) Horacio Zeballos (final)
2. (Brazil) Franco Ferreiro / (Brazil) André Sá (champions)
3. (United States) James Cerretani / (Canada) Adil Shamasdin (semifinals)
4. (Brazil) Rogério Dutra da Silva / (Brazil) João Souza (quarterfinals)

== Draw ==
Key

- Q = Qualifier
- WC = Wild card
- LL = Lucky loser
- Alt = Alternate
- ITF = ITF entry
- PR = Protected ranking
- SR = Special ranking
- SE = Special exempt
- JE = Junior exempt
- JR = Junior Accelerator Programme entrant
- CO = College Accelerator Programme entrant
- NG = Next Gen Accelerator Program entrant
- w/o = Walkover
- r = Retired
- d = Defaulted

=== Draw ===
First round
1	(Mexico) S González (Argentina) H Zeballos	6^{5}	6	[10]
WC	(Sweden) Christian Lindell (Brazil) Fernando Romboli	7	3	[7]
(Brazil) Tiago Lopes (Brazil) D Dutra da Silva	0^{r}
(Argentina) JP Brzezicki (Argentina) A Molteni	2
3	(United States) J Cerretani (Canada) A Shamasdin	6	7
(Italy) D Giorgini (Portugal) J Sousa	4	5
(Argentina) F del Bonis (Ecuador) G Lapentti
(Spain) G Alcaide (Belarus) U Ignatik	w/o
(Chile) P Capdeville (Spain) A Menéndez-Maceiras	1	2
(Brazil) R Grilli (Brazil) R Guidolin	6	6
(Italy) Andrea Arnaboldi (Argentina) M González	1	2
4	(Brazil) R Dutra da Silva (Brazil) J Souza	6	6
(Brazil) T Alves (Brazil) R Hocevar	2	2
WC	(Brazil) M Demoliner (Brazil) A Ghem	6	6
(Brazil) R Mello (Brazil) C Zampieri	2	2
2	(Brazil) F Ferreiro (Brazil) A Sá	6	6

Quarterfinals
1	(Mexico) S González (Argentina) H Zeballos	7	6
(Argentina) JP Brzezicki (Argentina) A Molteni	6^{3}	2
3	(United States) J Cerretani (Canada) A Shamasdin
(Argentina) F del Bonis (Ecuador) G Lapentti	w/o
(Brazil) R Grilli (Brazil) R Guidolin	6	6
4	(Brazil) R Dutra da Silva (Brazil) J Souza	1	0
WC	(Brazil) M Demoliner (Brazil) A Ghem	5	6^{2}
2	(Brazil) F Ferreiro (Brazil) A Sá	7	7

Semifinals
1	(Mexico) S González (Argentina) H Zeballos	6	6^{6}	[10]
3	(United States) J Cerretani (Canada) A Shamasdin	4	7	[5]
(Brazil) R Grilli (Brazil) R Guidolin	3	6^{0}
2	(Brazil) F Ferreiro (Brazil) A Sá	6	7

Final
1	(Mexico) S González (Argentina) H Zeballos	5	6^{12}
2	(Brazil) F Ferreiro (Brazil) A Sá	7	7
