= 2010 Aberto de Brasília – Singles =

Singles
- 2010 Aberto de Brasília

Final
- Champion: (Japan) Tatsuma Ito
- Runner-up: (South Africa) Izak van der Merwe
- Score: 6–4, 6–4

Events
Singles	Doubles
- Aberto de Brasília

Ricardo Mello did not defend his 2009 title, losing to eventual champion Tatsuma Ito in the semifinals.
Ito, the 261st ranked player in the world as of August 2, 2010, defeated Izak van der Merwe 6–4, 6–4 in the final.

== Seeds ==
1. (Brazil) Ricardo Mello (semifinals)
2. (Argentina) Federico del Bonis (first round)
3. (France) David Guez (second round)
4. (France) Josselin Ouanna (first round, retired due to a right ankle injury)
5. (Brazil) João Souza (quarterfinals)
6. (Brazil) Thiago Alves (second round)
7. (Brazil) Marcos Daniel (first round)
8. (Belarus) Uladzimir Ignatik (quarterfinals)

== Draw ==
Key

- Q = Qualifier
- WC = Wild card
- LL = Lucky loser
- Alt = Alternate
- ITF = ITF entry
- PR = Protected ranking
- SR = Special ranking
- SE = Special exempt
- JE = Junior exempt
- JR = Junior Accelerator Programme entrant
- CO = College Accelerator Programme entrant
- NG = Next Gen Accelerator Program entrant
- w/o = Walkover
- r = Retired
- d = Defaulted

=== Finals ===
Semifinals
1	(Brazil) Ricardo Mello	2	4
(Japan) Tatsuma Ito	6	6
(Brazil) Rogério Dutra da Silva	3	3
(South Africa) Izak van der Merwe	6	6

Final
(Japan) Tatsuma Ito	6	6
(South Africa) Izak van der Merwe	4	4

=== Top half ===
First round
1	(Brazil) R Mello	3	6	6
(Italy) R Ghedin	6	2	2
(Spain) G Alcaide	6	6
Q	(Uruguay) M Felder	4	2
Q	(France) F Martin	4	3
(Ecuador) G Lapentti	6	6
WC	(Brazil) A Laranja	4	4
8	(Belarus) U Ignatik	6	6
3	(France) D Guez	3	6	6
WC	(Brazil) G Clézar	6	3	1
(Brazil) R Hocevar	6^{2}	2
(Japan) T Ito	7	6
(Brazil) J Silva	6	6
(France) C-A Brezac	2	1
Q	(United States) N Monroe	6	3	6^{3}
5	(Brazil) J Souza	4	6	7

Second round
1	(Brazil) R Mello	6	6
(Spain) G Alcaide	4	2
(Ecuador) G Lapentti	1	3
8	(Belarus) U Ignatik	6	6
3	(France) D Guez	4	4
(Japan) T Ito	6	6
(Brazil) J Silva	2	7	4
5	(Brazil) J Souza	6	5	6

Quarterfinals
1	(Brazil) R Mello	6	6
8	(Belarus) U Ignatik	4	3
(Japan) T Ito	7	6
5	(Brazil) J Souza	6^{4}	2

Semifinals
1	(Brazil) R Mello	2	4
(Japan) T Ito	6	6

=== Bottom half ===
First round
7	(Brazil) M Daniel	4	4
(Republic of Ireland) L Sorensen	6	6
(Netherlands) M Middelkoop	4	6	6
(Spain) A Menéndez-Maceiras	6	3	4
WC	(Brazil) F Romboli	1	0
WC	(Brazil) R Dutra da Silva	6	6
(Slovakia) M Kližan	5
4	(France) J Ouanna	5	r
6	(Brazil) T Alves	2	7	7
(Argentina) F Bagnis	6	6^{5}	5
(South Africa) I van der Merwe	7	6
(Brazil) C Zampieri	5	4
(Japan) Y Sugita	2	3
Q	(Colombia) R Farah	6	6
(United Kingdom) J Baker	6	6
2	(Argentina) F del Bonis	4	2

Second round
(Republic of Ireland) L Sorensen	3	7	6
(Netherlands) M Middelkoop	6	5	3
WC	(Brazil) R Dutra da Silva	6	6
(Slovakia) M Kližan	0	3
6	(Brazil) T Alves	4	2
(South Africa) I van der Merwe	6	6
Q	(Colombia) R Farah	6	6
(United Kingdom) J Baker	3	3

Quarterfinals
(Republic of Ireland) L Sorensen	1	6	4
WC	(Brazil) R Dutra da Silva	6	4	6
(South Africa) I van der Merwe	6	6
Q	(Colombia) R Farah	0	2

Semifinals
WC	(Brazil) R Dutra da Silva	3	3
(South Africa) I van der Merwe	6	6
