= 2014 Aberto de São Paulo – Singles =

Singles
- 2014 Aberto de São Paulo

Final
- Champion: (Brazil) João Souza
- Runner-up: (Colombia) Alejandro González
- Score: 6–4, 6–4

Events
Singles	Doubles
← 2013 ·	Aberto de São Paulo

Horacio Zeballos was the defending champion, but lost in the first round to Agustín Velotti.

João Souza won the title, defeating Alejandro González in the final, 6–4, 6–4.

== Seeds ==
1. (Argentina) Horacio Zeballos (first round)
2. (Colombia) Alejandro González (final)
3. (Argentina) Guido Pella (semifinals)
4. (Argentina) Facundo Bagnis (first round)
5. (Argentina) Facundo Argüello (quarterfinals)
6. (Argentina) Martín Alund (first round)
7. (Brazil) João Souza (champion)
8. (Dominican Republic) Víctor Estrella Burgos (first round)

== Draw ==
=== Key ===
- Q = Qualifier
- WC = Wild card
- LL = Lucky loser
- Alt = Alternate
- ITF = ITF entry
- PR = Protected ranking
- SR = Special ranking
- SE = Special exempt
- JE = Junior exempt
- JR = Junior Accelerator Programme entrant
- CO = College Accelerator Programme entrant
- NG = Next Gen Accelerator Program entrant
- w/o = Walkover
- r = Retired
- d = Defaulted

=== Finals ===
Semifinals
7	(Brazil) João Souza	7^{7}	6
3	(Argentina) Guido Pella	6^{1}	4
(Portugal) Gastão Elias	3	0^{r}
2	(Colombia) Alejandro González	6	4

Final
7	(Brazil) João Souza	6	6
2	(Colombia) Alejandro González	4	4

=== Top half ===
First round
1	(Argentina) H Zeballos	4	4
(Argentina) A Velotti	6	6
WC	(Brazil) J Pereira	6	6
(Italy) S Vagnozzi	3	2
WC	(Brazil) B Sant'Anna	2	1
(Brazil) A Ghem	6	6
PR	(United States) D Kosakowski	6	5	1
7	(Brazil) J Souza	4	7	6
3	(Argentina) G Pella	7^{7}	2	6
(Argentina) T Lipovšek Puches	6^{2}	6	3
WC	(Brazil) Rafael Camilo	4	1
(Brazil) G Clezar	6	6
Q	(Brazil) M Demoliner	6	6^{2}	6^{5}
(Argentina) G Andreozzi	1	7^{7}	7^{7}
(Portugal) P Sousa	6	6
6	(Argentina) M Alund	0	2

Second round
(Argentina) A Velotti	7	7
WC	(Brazil) J Pereira	5	5
(Brazil) A Ghem	2	3
7	(Brazil) J Souza	6	6
3	(Argentina) G Pella	7^{7}	4	7^{7}
(Brazil) G Clezar	6^{5}	6	6^{2}
(Argentina) G Andreozzi	4	7^{7}	6
(Portugal) P Sousa	6	6^{0}	0

Quarterfinals
(Argentina) A Velotti	4	3
7	(Brazil) J Souza	6	6
3	(Argentina) G Pella	6	6
(Argentina) G Andreozzi	2	3

Semifinals
7	(Brazil) J Souza	7^{7}	6
3	(Argentina) G Pella	6^{1}	4

=== Bottom half ===
First round
5	(Argentina) F Argüello	6	6
PR	(Argentina) E Schwank	4	4
Q	(Brazil) F de Paula	6^{2}	3
(Brazil) T Turini	7^{7}	6
(Portugal) G Elias	6	6
(Brazil) Wilson Leite	4	4
Q	(Germany) Moritz Buerchner	1	7^{7}	6
4	(Argentina) F Bagnis	6	6^{1}	3
8	(Dominican Republic) V Estrella Burgos	6^{3}	0
(Brazil) F Romboli	7^{7}	6
Q	(Brazil) Henrique Cunha	3	6	6
(Argentina) M Trungelliti	6	2	3
(Colombia) N Barrientos	6	6
WC	(Brazil) Osni Junior	0	1
(Chile) H Podlipnik Castillo	1	0
2	(Colombia) A González	6	6

Second round
5	(Argentina) F Argüello	6	6
(Brazil) T Turini	3	4
(Portugal) G Elias	6	6
Q	(Germany) M Buerchner	2	4
(Brazil) F Romboli	6	6
Q	(Brazil) H Cunha	4	4
(Colombia) N Barrientos	1	2
2	(Colombia) A González	6	6

Quarterfinals
5	(Argentina) F Argüello	3	2
(Portugal) G Elias	6	6
(Brazil) F Romboli	4	2
2	(Colombia) A González	6	6

Semifinals
(Portugal) G Elias	3	0^{r}
2	(Colombia) A González	6	4
