= 2010 Aberto de Brasília – Doubles =

Doubles
- 2010 Aberto de Brasília

Final
- Champions: (Brazil) Franco Ferreiro (Brazil) André Sá
- Runners-up: (Brazil) Ricardo Mello (Brazil) Caio Zampieri
- Score: 7–6(5), 6–3

Events
Singles	Doubles
- Aberto de Brasília

Marcelo Demoliner and Rodrigo Guidolin were the defending champions. Demoliner decided not to participate and Guidolin partnered with Marcel Felder.
Franco Ferreiro and André Sá won the title, defeating Ricardo Mello and Caio Zampieri 7–6(5), 6–3 in the final.

== Seeds ==
1. (Brazil) Franco Ferreiro / (Brazil) André Sá (champions)
2. (South Africa) Raven Klaasen / (South Africa) Izak van der Merwe (semifinals)
3. (Belarus) Uladzimir Ignatik / (Slovakia) Martin Kližan (first round)
4. (United Kingdom) Jamie Baker / (United States) Nicholas Monroe (first round)

== Draw ==
Key

- Q = Qualifier
- WC = Wild card
- LL = Lucky loser
- Alt = Alternate
- ITF = ITF entry
- PR = Protected ranking
- SR = Special ranking
- SE = Special exempt
- JE = Junior exempt
- JR = Junior Accelerator Programme entrant
- CO = College Accelerator Programme entrant
- NG = Next Gen Accelerator Program entrant
- w/o = Walkover
- r = Retired
- d = Defaulted

=== Draw ===
First round
1	(Brazil) F Ferreiro (Brazil) A Sá	6	6
WC	(Brazil) L Kirche (Brazil) T Lopes	1	4
(Brazil) T Alves (Brazil) M Torres	3	3
(Colombia) JS Cabal (Colombia) R Farah	6	6
3	(Belarus) U Ignatik (Slovakia) M Kližan	3	1
(Brazil) R Dutra da Silva (Brazil) J Silva	6	6
(Spain) G Alcaide (Spain) A Menéndez-Maceiras	6	6
WC	(Brazil) V Maynard (Brazil) N Santos	4	3
(Argentina) F Bagnis (Argentina) F del Bonis	6^{5}	4
(Brazil) R Mello (Brazil) C Zampieri	7	6
ALT	(Japan) T Ito (Japan) Y Sugita	6	7
4	(United Kingdom) J Baker (United States) N Monroe	3	6^{7}
(Uruguay) M Felder (Brazil) R Guidolin	6	6
WC	(Brazil) F Romboli (Brazil) D Silva	3	4
(France) C-A Brezac (France) V Stouff	1	2
2	(South Africa) R Klaasen (South Africa) I van der Merwe	6	6

Quarterfinals
1	(Brazil) F Ferreiro (Brazil) A Sá	7	7
(Colombia) JS Cabal (Colombia) R Farah	5	5
(Brazil) R Dutra da Silva (Brazil) J Silva	6	6
(Spain) G Alcaide (Spain) A Menéndez-Maceiras	2	3
(Brazil) R Mello (Brazil) C Zampieri	7	7
ALT	(Japan) T Ito (Japan) Y Sugita	5	6^{2}
(Uruguay) M Felder (Brazil) R Guidolin	3	2
2	(South Africa) R Klaasen (South Africa) I van der Merwe	6	6

Semifinals
1	(Brazil) F Ferreiro (Brazil) A Sá	6	4	[11]
(Brazil) R Dutra da Silva (Brazil) J Silva	4	6	[9]
(Brazil) R Mello (Brazil) C Zampieri	6	6
2	(South Africa) R Klaasen (South Africa) I van der Merwe	4	4

Finals
1	(Brazil) F Ferreiro (Brazil) A Sá	7	6
(Brazil) R Mello (Brazil) C Zampieri	6^{5}	3
