= 2009 Aberto de Brasília =

- Date: August 10–16
- Edition: 1st
- Location: Brasília, Brazil

Champions

Singles
- (Brazil) Ricardo Mello

Doubles
- (Brazil) Marcelo Demoliner / (Brazil) Rodrigo Guidolin
Aberto de Brasília	· 2010 →

The 2009 Aberto de Brasília was a professional tennis tournament played on outdoor hardcourts. It was part of the 2009 ATP Challenger Tour. It took place in Brasília, Brazil between 10 and 16 August 2009.

== Singles entrants ==
=== Seeds ===
Nationality	Player	Ranking*	Seeding
CHI	Nicolás Massú	90	1
BRA	Thiago Alves	94	2
ARG	Horacio Zeballos	97	3
ARG	Juan Ignacio Chela	159	4
ARG	~~Eduardo Schwank~~	~~161~~	~~5~~
BRA	Ricardo Hocevar	176	6
GBR	Joshua Goodall	189	7
ECU	Giovanni Lapentti	196	8

- Rankings are as of August 3, 2009.

=== Other entrants ===
The following players received wildcards into the singles main draw:

- (Argentina) Juan Ignacio Chela
- (Brazil) José Pereira
- (Brazil) Eládio Ribeiro Neto
- (Argentina) Mariano Zabaleta

The following players received entry from the qualifying draw:

- (Brazil) Alexandre Bonatto (as a Lucky loser)
- (Brazil) Rodrigo Guidolin
- (New Zealand) Daniel King-Turner
- (France) Fabrice Martin
- (Peru) Iván Miranda

== Champions ==
=== Singles ===
(Brazil) Ricardo Mello def. (Argentina) Juan Ignacio Chela, 7–6(2), 6–4

=== Doubles ===
(Brazil) Marcelo Demoliner / (Brazil) Rodrigo Guidolin def. (Brazil) Ricardo Mello / (Brazil) Caio Zampieri, 6–4, 6–2
