= 2012 Aberto de São Paulo =

- Date: 2–8 January
- Edition: 12th
- Location: São Paulo, Brazil

Champions

Singles
- (Brazil) Thiago Alves

Doubles
- (Brazil) Fernando Romboli / (Brazil) Júlio Silva
← 2011 ·	Aberto de São Paulo	· 2013 →

The 2012 Aberto de São Paulo was a professional tennis tournament played on hard courts. It was the twelfth edition of the tournament which is part of the 2012 ATP Challenger Tour. It took place in São Paulo, Brazil between 2 and 8 January 2011.

== Singles main-draw entrants ==
=== Seeds ===
Country	Player	Rank^{1}	Seed
ARG	Horacio Zeballos	109	1
BRA	Rogério Dutra da Silva	124	2
BRA	Júlio Silva	153	3
ARG	Federico Delbonis	166	4
POR	Gastão Elias	172	5
BRA	Caio Zampieri	253	6
COL	Eduardo Struvay	254	7
ARG	Juan Pablo Brzezicki	262	8

- ^{1} Rankings are as of December 26, 2012.

=== Other entrants ===
The following players received wildcards into the singles main draw:

- (Brazil) Henrique Cunha
- (Brazil) Daniel Dutra da Silva
- (Brazil) Leonardo Kirche
- (Brazil) Thiago Monteiro

The following players received entry from the qualifying draw:

- (Brazil) Augusto Laranja
- (Brazil) Jose Pereira
- (Brazil) Bruno Sant'anna
- (Argentina) Maximiliano Estévez

== Champions ==
=== Singles ===
(Brazil) Thiago Alves def. (Portugal) Gastão Elias, 7–6^{(7–5)}, 7–6^{(7–1)}

=== Doubles ===
(Brazil) Fernando Romboli / (Brazil) Júlio Silva def. (Slovakia) Jozef Kovalík / (Brazil) José Pereira, 7–5, 6–2
