= 2010 Prime Cup Aberto de São Paulo – Doubles =

Doubles
- 2010 Prime Cup Aberto de São Paulo

Final
- Champions: (Argentina) Brian Dabul (Argentina) Sebastián Prieto
- Runners-up: (Poland) Tomasz Bednarek (Poland) Mateusz Kowalczyk
- Score: 6-3, 6-3

Events
Singles	Doubles
- Prime Cup Aberto de São Paulo

Carlos Berlocq and Leonardo Mayer were the defending champions, but chose not to participate that year.

Brian Dabul and Sebastián Prieto won in the final 6-3, 6-3 against Tomasz Bednarek and Mateusz Kowalczyk.

== Seeds ==
1. (Thailand) Sanchai Ratiwatana / (Thailand) Sonchat Ratiwatana (semifinals)
2. (Argentina) Brian Dabul / (Argentina) Sebastián Prieto (champions)
3. (United Kingdom) Jonathan Marray / (United Kingdom) Jamie Murray (semifinals)
4. (United States) David Martin / (Germany) Frank Moser (first round)

== Draw ==
Key

- Q = Qualifier
- WC = Wild card
- LL = Lucky loser
- Alt = Alternate
- ITF = ITF entry
- PR = Protected ranking
- SR = Special ranking
- SE = Special exempt
- JE = Junior exempt
- JR = Junior Accelerator Programme entrant
- CO = College Accelerator Programme entrant
- NG = Next Gen Accelerator Program entrant
- w/o = Walkover
- r = Retired
- d = Defaulted

=== Draw ===
First round
1	(Thailand) S Ratiwatana (Thailand) S Ratiwatana	7	7
(Brazil) M Demoliner (Philippines) TC Huey	5	5
WC	(Brazil) A Bonatto (Brazil) R Grilli	7	4	[5]
(Argentina) L Arnold Ker (Paraguay) R Delgado	5	6	[10]
4	(United States) D Martin (Germany) F Moser	3	3
(Brazil) F Ferreiro (Brazil) R Mello	6	6
(Poland) T Bednarek (Poland) M Kowalczyk	7	7
(Argentina) JP Brzezicki (Argentina) S Decoud	5	6^{2}
WC	(Brazil) T Lopes (Brazil) J Wiesinger	5	2
(Chile) N Massú (Chile) J Aguilar	7	6
(Brazil) M Daniel (Mexico) S González	6^{4}	6^{3}
3	(United Kingdom) J Marray (United Kingdom) J Murray	7	7
(Argentina) D Junqueira (Spain) P Santos	1	3
WC	(Brazil) R Dutra da Silva (Brazil) J Silva	6	6
(Argentina) D Cristi (Argentina) E Schwank	6^{3}	6	[8]
2	(Argentina) B Dabul (Argentina) S Prieto	7	4	[10]

Quarterfinals
1	(Thailand) S Ratiwatana (Thailand) S Ratiwatana	6	4	[10]
(Argentina) L Arnold Ker (Paraguay) R Delgado	4	6	[5]
(Brazil) F Ferreiro (Brazil) R Mello	7	6^{2}	[5]
(Poland) T Bednarek (Poland) M Kowalczyk	6^{2}	7	[10]
(Chile) N Massú (Chile) J Aguilar	2	3
3	(United Kingdom) J Marray (United Kingdom) J Murray	6	6
WC	(Brazil) R Dutra Da Silva (Brazil) J Silva	6	4	[3]
2	(Argentina) B Dabul (Argentina) S Prieto	4	6	[10]

Semifinals
1	(Thailand) S Ratiwatana (Thailand) S Ratiwatana	6^{5}	7	[5]
(Poland) T Bednarek (Poland) M Kowalczyk	7	6^{5}	[10]
3	(United Kingdom) J Marray (United Kingdom) J Murray	4	6	[7]
2	(Argentina) B Dabul (Argentina) S Prieto	6	2	[10]

Finals
(Poland) T Bednarek (Poland) M Kowalczyk	3	3
2	(Argentina) B Dabul (Argentina) S Prieto	6	6
