= 2012 Aberto de São Paulo – Singles =

Singles
- 2012 Aberto de São Paulo

Final
- Champion: (Brazil) Thiago Alves
- Runner-up: (Portugal) Gastão Elias
- Score: 7–6^{(7–5)}, 7–6^{(7–1)}

Events
Singles	Doubles
- Aberto de São Paulo

Ricardo Mello was the defending champion but decided not to participate.
Thiago Alves won the title after defeating Gastão Elias 7–6^{(7–5)}, 7–6^{(7–1)} in the final.

== Seeds ==
1. (Argentina) Horacio Zeballos (quarterfinals)
2. (Brazil) Rogério Dutra da Silva (semifinals)
3. (Brazil) Júlio Silva (first round)
4. (Argentina) Federico Delbonis (semifinals)
5. (Portugal) Gastão Elias (final)
6. (Brazil) Caio Zampieri (first round)
7. (Colombia) Eduardo Struvay (first round)
8. (Argentina) Juan Pablo Brzezicki (second round, retired)

== Draw ==
Key

- Q = Qualifier
- WC = Wild card
- LL = Lucky loser
- Alt = Alternate
- ITF = ITF entry
- PR = Protected ranking
- SR = Special ranking
- SE = Special exempt
- JE = Junior exempt
- JR = Junior Accelerator Programme entrant
- CO = College Accelerator Programme entrant
- NG = Next Gen Accelerator Program entrant
- w/o = Walkover
- r = Retired
- d = Defaulted

=== Final four ===
Semifinals
5	(Portugal) Gastão Elias	3	7	7
4	(Argentina) Federico Delbonis	6	5	5
(Brazil) Thiago Alves	6	6
2	(Brazil) Rogério Dutra da Silva	4	4

Final
5	(Portugal) Gastão Elias	6^{5}	6^{1}
(Brazil) Thiago Alves	7^{7}	7^{7}

=== Top half ===
First round
1	(Argentina) H Zeballos	6	6
Q	(Brazil) J Pereira	3	2
(Croatia) K Mesaroš	0	6^{5}
(Brazil) F de Paula	6	7^{7}
WC	(Brazil) D Dutra da Silva	3	4
WC	(Brazil) L Kirche	6	6
(Peru) D Beretta	4	2
5	(Portugal) G Elias	6	6
4	(Argentina) F Delbonis	6	6
(Brazil) G Clézar	4	2
WC	(Brazil) T Monteiro	3	2
(Brazil) A Ghem	6	6
WC	(Brazil) Henrique Cunha	4	6	5
Q	(Brazil) A Laranja	6	4	7
(Slovakia) J Kovalík	6	5	6
6	(Brazil) C Zampieri	3	7	2

Second round
1	(Argentina) H Zeballos	4	6	6
(Brazil) F de Paula	6	3	4
WC	(Brazil) L Kirche	3	2
5	(Portugal) G Elias	6	6
4	(Argentina) F Delbonis	7	6
(Brazil) A Ghem	5	4
Q	(Brazil) A Laranja	5	6	6^{6}
(Slovakia) J Kovalík	7	4	7^{8}

Quarterfinals
1	(Argentina) H Zeballos	4	6	5
5	(Portugal) G Elias	6	3	7
4	(Argentina) F Delbonis	6	6
(Slovakia) J Kovalík	3	0

Semifinals
5	(Portugal) G Elias	3	7	7
4	(Argentina) F Delbonis	6	5	5

=== Bottom half ===
First round
8	(Argentina) JP Brzezicki	6	6
(Argentina) Nicolás Pastor	1	4
(Argentina) A Velotti	6	6
(Brazil) Tiago Lopes	2	2
(Argentina) M Trungelliti	6^{5}	7^{9}	6
Q	(Argentina) Maximiliano Estévez	7^{7}	6^{7}	1
(Brazil) T Alves	6	4	6
3	(Brazil) J Silva	4	6	3
7	(Colombia) E Struvay	6	4	6^{6}
(Brazil) F Romboli	2	6	7^{8}
Q	(Brazil) B Sant'anna	6	6
(France) N Devilder	4	4
(Austria) M Linzer	7	3	5
(Brazil) R Hocevar	5	6	7
(Brazil) M Demoliner	7^{7}	2	1
2	(Brazil) R Dutra da Silva	6^{4}	6	6

Second round
8	(Argentina) JP Brzezicki	4	0^{r}
(Argentina) A Velotti	6	3
(Argentina) M Trungelliti	5	4
(Brazil) T Alves	7	6
(Brazil) F Romboli	4	6	6
Q	(Brazil) B Sant'anna	6	3	4
(Brazil) R Hocevar	4	6^{4}
2	(Brazil) R Dutra da Silva	6	7

Quarterfinals
(Argentina) A Velotti	2	3
(Brazil) T Alves	6	6
(Brazil) F Romboli	2	1
2	(Brazil) R Dutra da Silva	6	6

Semifinals
(Brazil) T Alves	6	6
2	(Brazil) R Dutra da Silva	4	4
