= 2014 Aberto de São Paulo – Doubles =

Doubles
- 2014 Aberto de São Paulo

Final
- Champions: (Germany) Gero Kretschmer; (Germany) Alexander Satschko
- Runners-up: (Colombia) Nicolás Barrientos; (Dominican Republic) Víctor Estrella Burgos
- Score: 4–6, 7–5, [10–6]

Events
| Singles | Doubles |
| ← 2013 · | Aberto de São Paulo |

James Cerretani and Adil Shamasdin were the defending champions but lost in the first round to Henrique Cunha and F Romboli.

Kretschmer and Satschko won the title, defeating Nicolás Barrientos and Víctor Estrella Burgos in the final, 4–6, 7–5, [10–6].

== Seeds ==
1. (Thailand) Sanchai Ratiwatana / (Thailand) Sonchat Ratiwatana (quarterfinals)
2. (United States) James Cerretani / (Canada) Adil Shamasdin (first round)
3. (Finland) Henri Kontinen / (Sweden) Andreas Siljeström (quarterfinals)
4. (Germany) Gero Kretschmer / (Germany) Alexander Satschko (champions)

== Draw ==
=== Key ===
- Q = Qualifier
- WC = Wild card
- LL = Lucky loser
- Alt = Alternate
- SE = Special exempt
- PR = Protected ranking
- ITF = ITF entry
- JE = Junior exempt
- w/o = Walkover
- r = Retired
- d = Defaulted
- SR = Special ranking

=== Draw ===
First round

Quarterfinals

Semifinals

Final

1
- (Thailand) Sa Ratiwatana
- (Thailand) So Ratiwatana
7^{7}
3
[10]

- (Argentina) G Andreozzi
- (Brazil) M Demoliner
6^{3}
6
[3]

1
- (Thailand) Sa Ratiwatana
- (Thailand) So Ratiwatana
6
6^{6}
[1]

- (Argentina) E Schwank
- (Argentina) H Zeballos
7^{7}
6^{1}
[8]

- (Brazil) G Clezar
- (Brazil) F de Paula
4
7^{8}
[10]

- (Brazil) G Clezar
- (Brazil) F de Paula
6^{4}
7^{7}
[10]

- (Brazil) G Clezar
- (Brazil) F de Paula
4
7
[9]

3
- (Finland) H Kontinen
- (Sweden) A Siljeström
6
7^{7}

- (Colombia) N Barrientos
- (Dominican Republic) V Estrella Burgos
6
5
[11]

- (Argentina) F Bagnis
- (Argentina) M Trungelliti
3
6^{5}

3
- (Finland) H Kontinen
- (Sweden) A Siljeström
2
4

WC
(Brazil) Osni Junior
(Brazil) Tiago Lopes
4
2

- (Colombia) N Barrientos
- (Dominican Republic) V Estrella Burgos
6
6

- (Colombia) N Barrientos
- (Dominican Republic) V Estrella Burgos
6
6

- (Colombia) N Barrientos
- (Dominican Republic) V Estrella Burgos
6
5
[6]

- (Uruguay) A Behar
- (Argentina) A Velotti
3
5

4
- (Germany) G Kretschmer
- (Germany) A Satschko
4
7
[10]

WC
- (Brazil) Rafael Camilo
- (Brazil) B Sant'Anna
6
7

WC
- (Brazil) R Camilo
- (Brazil) B Sant'Anna
3
6
[4]

Alt
- (United States) D Kosakowski
- (Chile) H Podlipnik Castillo
3
2

4
- (Germany) G Kretschmer
- (Germany) A Satschko
6
2
[10]

4
- (Germany) G Kretschmer
- (Germany) A Satschko
6
6

4
- (Germany) G Kretschmer
- (Germany) A Satschko
6
7^{7}

- (Brazil) A Ghem
- (Brazil) J Souza
6
6

WC
- (Brazil) H Cunha
- (Brazil) F Romboli
2
6^{4}

- (Argentina) F Argüello
- (Colombia) A González
3
4

- (Brazil) A Ghem
- (Brazil) J Souza
3
4

WC
- (Brazil) Henrique Cunha
- (Brazil) F Romboli
4
7^{18}
[10]

WC
- (Brazil) H Cunha
- (Brazil) F Romboli
6
6

2
- (United States) J Cerretani
- (Canada) A Shamasdin
6
6^{16}
[5]
