= 2013 Aberto de São Paulo – Doubles =

Doubles
- 2013 Aberto de São Paulo

Final
- Champions: (United States) James Cerretani (Canada) Adil Shamasdin
- Runners-up: (Argentina) Federico Delbonis (Argentina) Renzo Olivo
- Score: 6–7^{(5–7)}, 6–1, [11–9]

Events
| Singles | Doubles |
| ← 2012 · | Aberto de São Paulo | · 2014 → |

Fernando Romboli and Júlio Silva were the defending champions but Romboli decided not to participate.
Silva played alongside Thiago Alves but they lost in the first round.
James Cerretani and Adil Shamasdin won the final 6–7^{(5–7)}, 6–1, [11–9] against Federico Delbonis and Renzo Olivo to capture the title.

== Seeds ==
1. (United States) James Cerretani / (Canada) Adil Shamasdin (champions)
2. (Australia) Rameez Junaid / (Germany) Simon Stadler (second round)
3. (Brazil) André Ghem / (Brazil) João Souza (semifinals)
4. (South Africa) Rik de Voest / (Brazil) Marcelo Demoliner (second round)

== Draw ==
=== Key ===
- Q = Qualifier
- WC = Wild card
- LL = Lucky loser
- Alt = Alternate
- SE = Special exempt
- PR = Protected ranking
- ITF = ITF entry
- JE = Junior exempt
- w/o = Walkover
- r = Retired
- d = Defaulted
- SR = Special ranking

=== Draw ===
First round
1 | (United States) J Cerretani (Canada) A Shamasdin | 6 | 4 | [10]
(Brazil) T Alves (Brazil) J Silva | 4 | 6 | [7]
WC | (Brazil) R Hocevar (Brazil) L Kirche | 3 | 4
(Argentina) G Andreozzi (Argentina) H Zeballos | 6 | 6
4 | (South Africa) R de Voest (Brazil) M Demoliner | 7 | 6
(Uruguay) A Behar (Argentina) M Trungelliti | 5 | 3
(United States) D Britton (United States) A Krajicek | 6 | 6
(Argentina) M Alund (Ecuador) JC Campozano | 3 | 4
(Italy) A Motti (Croatia) F Škugor | 6 | 6
(Chile) J Aguilar (Argentina) D Schwartzman | 2 | 2
WC | (Brazil) Rafael Camilo (Brazil) D Dutra da Silva | 3 | 2
3 | (Brazil) A Ghem (Brazil) J Souza | 6 | 6
(Argentina) F Delbonis (Argentina) R Olivo | 6 | 4 | [10]
WC | (Brazil) R Dutra da Silva (Brazil) E Russi | 3 | 6 | [8]
(Argentina) F Bagnis (Colombia) A González | 6^{4} | 6^{5}
2 | (Australia) R Junaid (Germany) S Stadler | 7^{7} | 7^{7}

Quarterfinals
1 | (United States) J Cerretani (Canada) A Shamasdin | 5 | 6 | [12]
(Argentina) G Andreozzi (Argentina) H Zeballos | 7 | 2 | [10]
4 | (South Africa) R de Voest (Brazil) M Demoliner | 3 | 4
(United States) D Britton (United States) A Krajicek | 6 | 6
(Italy) A Motti (Croatia) F Škugor | 2 | 3
3 | (Brazil) A Ghem (Brazil) J Souza | 6 | 6
(Argentina) F Delbonis (Argentina) R Olivo | 6^{3} | 7^{7} | [10]
2 | (Australia) R Junaid (Germany) S Stadler | 7^{7} | 6^{5} | [7]

Semifinals
1 | (United States) J Cerretani (Canada) A Shamasdin | 3 | 7^{7} | [10]
(United States) D Britton (United States) A Krajicek | 6 | 6^{5} | [5]
3 | (Brazil) A Ghem (Brazil) J Souza | 6^{5} | 5
(Argentina) F Delbonis (Argentina) R Olivo | 7^{7} | 7

Final
1 | (United States) J Cerretani (Canada) A Shamasdin | 6^{5} | 6 | [11]
(Argentina) F Delbonis (Argentina) R Olivo | 7^{7} | 1 | [9]
