= 2012 Aberto de São Paulo – Doubles =

Doubles
- 2012 Aberto de São Paulo

Final
- Champions: (Brazil) Fernando Romboli (Brazil) Júlio Silva
- Runners-up: (Slovakia) Jozef Kovalík (Brazil) José Pereira
- Score: 7–5, 6–2

Events
Singles	Doubles
← 2011 ·	Aberto de São Paulo	· 2013 →

Franco Ferreiro and André Sá were the defending champions but Sá decided not to participate.
Ferreiro plays alongside Marcelo Demoliner but lost in the first round to Jozef Kovalík and José Pereira. Kovalík and Pereira went on to reach the final but lost to Fernando Romboli and Júlio Silva 5–7, 2–6.

== Seeds ==
1. (Brazil) Fernando Romboli / (Brazil) Júlio Silva (champions)
2. (Brazil) Marcelo Demoliner / (Brazil) Franco Ferreiro (first round)
3. (Argentina) Federico Delbonis / (Argentina) Nicolás Pastor (first round)
4. (Brazil) André Ghem / (Brazil) Caio Zampieri (semifinals)

== Draw ==
Key

- Q = Qualifier
- WC = Wild card
- LL = Lucky loser
- Alt = Alternate
- ITF = ITF entry
- PR = Protected ranking
- SR = Special ranking
- SE = Special exempt
- JE = Junior exempt
- JR = Junior Accelerator Programme entrant
- CO = College Accelerator Programme entrant
- NG = Next Gen Accelerator Program entrant
- w/o = Walkover
- r = Retired
- d = Defaulted

=== Draw ===
First round
1	(Brazil) F Romboli (Brazil) J Silva	5	6	[10]
WC	(Brazil) N Santos (Brazil) Ricardo Siggia	7	3	[8]
(Argentina) M Trungelliti (Argentina) H Zeballos	7^{7}	6
WC	(Brazil) T Monteiro (Brazil) B Sant'anna	6^{3}	2
3	(Argentina) F Delbonis (Argentina) Nicolás Pastor	2	6	[10]
(Brazil) T Alves (Brazil) M Torres	6	4	[12]
(Uruguay) A Behar (Colombia) E Struvay	6	6
(Brazil) F de Paula (Brazil) Diego Matos	4	3
(Argentina) JP Brzezicki (Argentina) Maximiliano Estévez	1	3
(Brazil) D Dutra da Silva (Brazil) L Kirche	6	6
WC	(Argentina) P Albano (Brazil) E Russi Assumpção	1	6^{1}
4	(Brazil) A Ghem (Brazil) C Zampieri	6	7^{7}
(Brazil) R Hocevar (Brazil) Tiago Lopes	3	3
(Peru) D Beretta (Argentina) A Velotti	6	6
(Slovakia) J Kovalík (Brazil) J Pereira	2	6	[10]
2	(Brazil) M Demoliner (Brazil) F Ferreiro	6	3	[5]

Quarterfinals
1	(Brazil) F Romboli (Brazil) J Silva	7	3	[10]
(Argentina) M Trungelliti (Argentina) H Zeballos	5	6	[3]
(Brazil) T Alves (Brazil) M Torres	7	1	[10]
(Uruguay) A Behar (Colombia) E Struvay	5	6	[4]
(Brazil) D Dutra da Silva (Brazil) L Kirche	6	3	[8]
4	(Brazil) A Ghem (Brazil) C Zampieri	3	6	[10]
(Peru) D Beretta (Argentina) A Velotti	6	1	[4]
(Slovakia) J Kovalík (Brazil) J Pereira	2	6	[10]

Semifinals
1	(Brazil) F Romboli (Brazil) J Silva
(Brazil) T Alves (Brazil) M Torres	w/o
4	(Brazil) A Ghem (Brazil) C Zampieri	1	2
(Slovakia) J Kovalík (Brazil) J Pereira	6	6

Final
1	(Brazil) F Romboli (Brazil) J Silva	7	6
(Slovakia) J Kovalík (Brazil) J Pereira	5	2
