= 2010 Prime Cup Aberto de São Paulo =

- Date: January 3 – January 10
- Edition: 10th
- Location: São Paulo, Brazil

Champions

Singles
- (Brazil) Ricardo Mello

Doubles
- (Argentina) Brian Dabul / (Argentina) Sebastián Prieto
- Aberto de São Paulo

The 2010 Aberto de São Paulo was a professional tennis tournament played on outdoor hard courts. It was part of the 2010 ATP Challenger Tour. It took place in São Paulo, Brazil between 3 and 10 January 2010.

== ATP entrants ==
=== Seeds ===
Country	Player	Rank^{1}	Seed
BRA	Marcos Daniel	87	1
CHI	Nicolás Massú	112	2
ARG	Eduardo Schwank	118	3
BRA	Thiago Alves	149	4
ARG	Sebastián Decoud	150	5
BRA	Ricardo Mello	151	6
COL	Carlos Salamanca	158	7
BRA	Júlio Silva	165	8

- Rankings are as of December 28, 2009

=== Other entrants ===
The following players received wildcards into the singles main draw:

- (Brazil) Marcelo Demoliner
- (Brazil) Leonardo Kirche
- (Brazil) Tiago Lopes
- (Brazil) Fernando Romboli

The following players received entry from the qualifying draw:

- (Lithuania) Ričardas Berankis
- (United States) Michael McClune
- (Spain) Guillermo Olaso
- (Brazil) Caio Zampieri

== Champions ==
=== Singles ===
- (Brazil) Ricardo Mello def. (Argentina) Eduardo Schwank, 6–3, 6–1

=== Doubles ===
- (Argentina) Brian Dabul / (Argentina) Sebastián Prieto def. (Poland) Tomasz Bednarek / (Poland) Mateusz Kowalczyk, 6–3, 6–3
