= 2014 Aberto de São Paulo =

- Date: 30 December 2013 – 5 January 2014
- Edition: 14th
- Draw: 32S / 16D
- Prize money: $125,000
- Surface: Hard
- Location: São Paulo, Brazil

Champions

Singles
- (Brazil) João Souza

Doubles
- (Germany) Gero Kretschmer / (Germany) Alexander Satschko
- Aberto de São Paulo

The 2014 Aberto de São Paulo was a professional tennis tournament played on hard courts. It was the 14th and last edition of the tournament which was part of the 2014 ATP Challenger Tour. It took place in São Paulo, Brazil between 30 December 2013 and 5 January 2014.

== Singles main-draw entrants ==
=== Seeds ===
Country	Player	Rank^{1}	Seed
ARG	Horacio Zeballos	56	1
COL	Alejandro González	91	2
ARG	Guido Pella	118	3
ARG	Facundo Bagnis	123	4
ARG	Facundo Argüello	124	5
ARG	Martín Alund	133	6
BRA	João Souza	140	7
DOM	Víctor Estrella Burgos	144	8

- ^{1} Rankings are as of December 23, 2013.

=== Other entrants ===
The following players received wildcards into the singles main draw:

- (Brazil) Rafael Camilo
- (Brazil) Osni Junior
- (Brazil) José Pereira
- (Brazil) Bruno Sant'anna

The following players used protected ranking to gain entry into the event:

- (United States) Daniel Kosakowski
- (Argentina) Eduardo Schwank

The following players received entry from the qualifying draw:

- (Germany) Moritz Buerchner
- (Brazil) Henrique Cunha
- (Brazil) Marcelo Demoliner
- (Brazil) Fabiano de Paula

== Champions ==
=== Singles ===
- (Brazil) João Souza def. (Colombia) Alejandro González, 6–4, 6–4

=== Doubles ===
- (Germany) Gero Kretschmer / (Germany) Alexander Satschko def. (Colombia) N Barrientos / (Dominican Republic) V Estrella Burgos, 4–6, 7–5, [10–6]
