= 2010 Prime Cup Aberto de São Paulo – Singles =

Singles
- 2010 Prime Cup Aberto de São Paulo

Final
- Champion: (Brazil) Ricardo Mello
- Runner-up: (Argentina) Eduardo Schwank
- Score: 6-3, 6-1

Events
Singles	Doubles
- Prime Cup Aberto de São Paulo

Ricardo Mello was the defending champion, and won in the final over Eduardo Schwank, 6-3, 6-1.

== Seeds ==
1. (Brazil) Marcos Daniel (first round)
2. (Chile) Nicolás Massú (first round)
3. (Argentina) Eduardo Schwank (final)
4. (Brazil) Thiago Alves (semifinals)
5. (Argentina) Sebastián Decoud (first round)
6. (Brazil) Ricardo Mello (champion)
7. (Colombia) Carlos Salamanca (first round)
8. (Brazil) Júlio Silva (second round)

== Draw ==
Key

- Q = Qualifier
- WC = Wild card
- LL = Lucky loser
- Alt = Alternate
- ITF = ITF entry
- PR = Protected ranking
- SR = Special ranking
- SE = Special exempt
- JE = Junior exempt
- JR = Junior Accelerator Programme entrant
- CO = College Accelerator Programme entrant
- NG = Next Gen Accelerator Program entrant
- w/o = Walkover
- r = Retired
- d = Defaulted

=== Finals ===
Semifinals
6	(Brazil) Ricardo Mello	6	6
4	(Brazil) Thiago Alves	4	4
3	(Argentina) Eduardo Schwank	7	6
(Paraguay) Ramón Delgado	6^{2}	3

Final
6	(Brazil) Ricardo Mello	6	6
3	(Argentina) Eduardo Schwank	3	1

=== Top half ===
First round
1	(Brazil) M Daniel	4	4
(Brazil) J Souza	6	6
(Argentina) B Dabul	7	7
WC	(Brazil) M Demoliner	6^{7}	5
WC	(Brazil) T Lopes	3	6^{16}
WC	(Brazil) F Romboli	6	7
(Argentina) G Gaudio	1	4
6	(Brazil) R Mello	6	6
4	(Brazil) T Alves	6	7
WC	(Brazil) L Kirche	4	6^{4}
(Chile) J Aguilar	6	7
(Mexico) S González	4	6^{1}
(Argentina) D Junqueira	1	2
(Argentina) JP Brzezicki	6	6
Q	(United States) M McClune	6	7
5	(Argentina) S Decoud	4	6^{4}

Second round
(Brazil) J Souza	7	6
(Argentina) B Dabul	6^{3}	1
WC	(Brazil) F Romboli	4	2
6	(Brazil) R Mello	6	6
4	(Brazil) T Alves	6	6^{4}	6
(Chile) J Aguilar	1	7	1
(Argentina) JP Brzezicki	6^{5}	7	5
Q	(United States) M McClune	7	6^{4}	7

Quarterfinals
(Brazil) J Souza	6^{2}	6^{8}
6	(Brazil) R Mello	7	7
4	(Brazil) T Alves	6	6
Q	(United States) M McClune	1	4

Semifinals
6	(Brazil) R Mello	6	6
4	(Brazil) T Alves	4	4

=== Bottom half ===
First round
7	(Colombia) C Salamanca	7	1	5
Q	(Lithuania) R Berankis	6^{6}	6	7
(Brazil) A Ghem	3	4
Q	(Spain) G Olaso	6	6
(Brazil) F Ferreiro	3	7	3
(Spain) P Santos	6	5	6
(Brazil) R Hocevar	3	7	6^{5}
3	(Argentina) E Schwank	6	6^{5}	7
8	(Brazil) J Silva	6	6
(Colombia) A González	3	2
(Uruguay) M Felder	3	1
(Paraguay) R Delgado	6	6
(Spain) I Cervantes-Huegun	6	3	3
Q	(Brazil) C Zampieri	4	6	6
(Spain) A Menéndez-Maceiras	7	6
2	(Chile) N Massú	6^{3}	3

Second round
Q	(Lithuania) R Berankis	6	7
Q	(Spain) G Olaso	1	6^{7}
(Spain) P Santos	4	1
3	(Argentina) E Schwank	6	6
8	(Brazil) J Silva	2	6^{3}
(Paraguay) R Delgado	6	7
Q	(Brazil) C Zampieri	1	4
(Spain) A Menéndez-Maceiras	6	6

Quarterfinals
Q	(Lithuania) R Berankis	1	4
3	(Argentina) E Schwank	6	6
(Paraguay) R Delgado	7	6
(Spain) A Menéndez-Maceiras	6^{7}	4

Semifinals
3	(Argentina) E Schwank	7	6
(Paraguay) R Delgado	6^{2}	3
