= 2010 Aberto de Brasília =

- Date: August 9 – August 14
- Edition: 2nd
- Location: Brasília, Brazil

Champions

Singles
- (Japan) Tatsuma Ito

Doubles
- (Brazil) Franco Ferreiro / (Brazil) André Sá
- Aberto de Brasília

The 2010 Aberto de Brasília was a professional tennis tournament played on outdoor hardcourts. It was the second edition of the tournament which was part of the 2010 ATP Challenger Tour. It took place in Brasília, Brazil between 9 and 14 August 2010.

== ATP entrants ==
=== Seeds ===
| Nationality | Player | Ranking* | Seeding |
|---|---|---|---|
| BRA | Ricardo Mello | 88 | 1 |
| ARG | Federico del Bonis | 122 | 2 |
| FRA | David Guez | 129 | 3 |
| FRA | Josselin Ouanna | 136 | 4 |
| BRA | João Souza | 139 | 5 |
| BRA | Thiago Alves | 145 | 6 |
| BRA | Marcos Daniel | 152 | 7 |
| BLR | Uladzimir Ignatik | 173 | 8 |

- Rankings are as of August 2, 2010.

=== Other entrants ===
The following players received wildcards into the singles main draw:

- (Brazil) Guilherme Clézar
- (Brazil) Rogério Dutra da Silva
- (Brazil) Augusto Laranja
- (Brazil) Fernando Romboli

The following player received an Alternate entry into the singles main draw:

- (France) Charles-Antoine Brézac

The following players received entry from the qualifying draw:

- (Colombia) Robert Farah
- (Uruguay) Marcel Felder
- (France) Fabrice Martin
- (United States) Nicholas Monroe

== Champions ==
=== Singles ===
(Japan) Tatsuma Ito def. (South Africa) Izak van der Merwe, 6–4, 6–4

=== Doubles ===
(Brazil) Franco Ferreiro / (Brazil) André Sá def. (Brazil) Ricardo Mello / (Brazil) Caio Zampieri, 7–6(5), 6–3
