= Aberto de Brasília =

Defunct tennis tournament
- Location: Brasília, Brazil
- Category: ATP Challenger Tour
- Surface: Hard (outdoor)
- Draw: 32S/28Q/16D
- Prize money: $35,000+H

The Aberto de Brasília (also known as Challenger de Brasília) was a professional tennis tournament played on outdoor hardcourts. It was part of the ATP Challenger Tour. It was held in the capital of Brazil, Brasília in 2009 and 2010.

== Past finals ==
=== Singles ===
Year	Champion	Runner-up	Score
2010	(Japan) Tatsuma Ito	(South Africa) Izak van der Merwe	6–4, 6–4
2009	(Brazil) Ricardo Mello	(Argentina) Juan Ignacio Chela	7–6(2), 6–4

=== Doubles ===
Year	Champions	Runners-up	Score
2010	(Brazil) Franco Ferreiro (Brazil) André Sá	(Brazil) Ricardo Mello (Brazil) Caio Zampieri	7–6(5), 6–3
2009	(Brazil) Marcelo Demoliner (Brazil) Rodrigo Guidolin	(Brazil) Ricardo Mello (Brazil) Caio Zampieri	6–4, 6–2
