= Aberto de São Paulo =

Defunct tennis tournament
- Event name: São Paulo
- Founded: 2001
- Abolished: 2014
- Editions: 14
- Location: São Paulo, Brazil
- Venue: Parque Villa Lobos
- Category: ATP Challenger Tour
- Surface: Hard
- Draw: 32S/32Q/16D

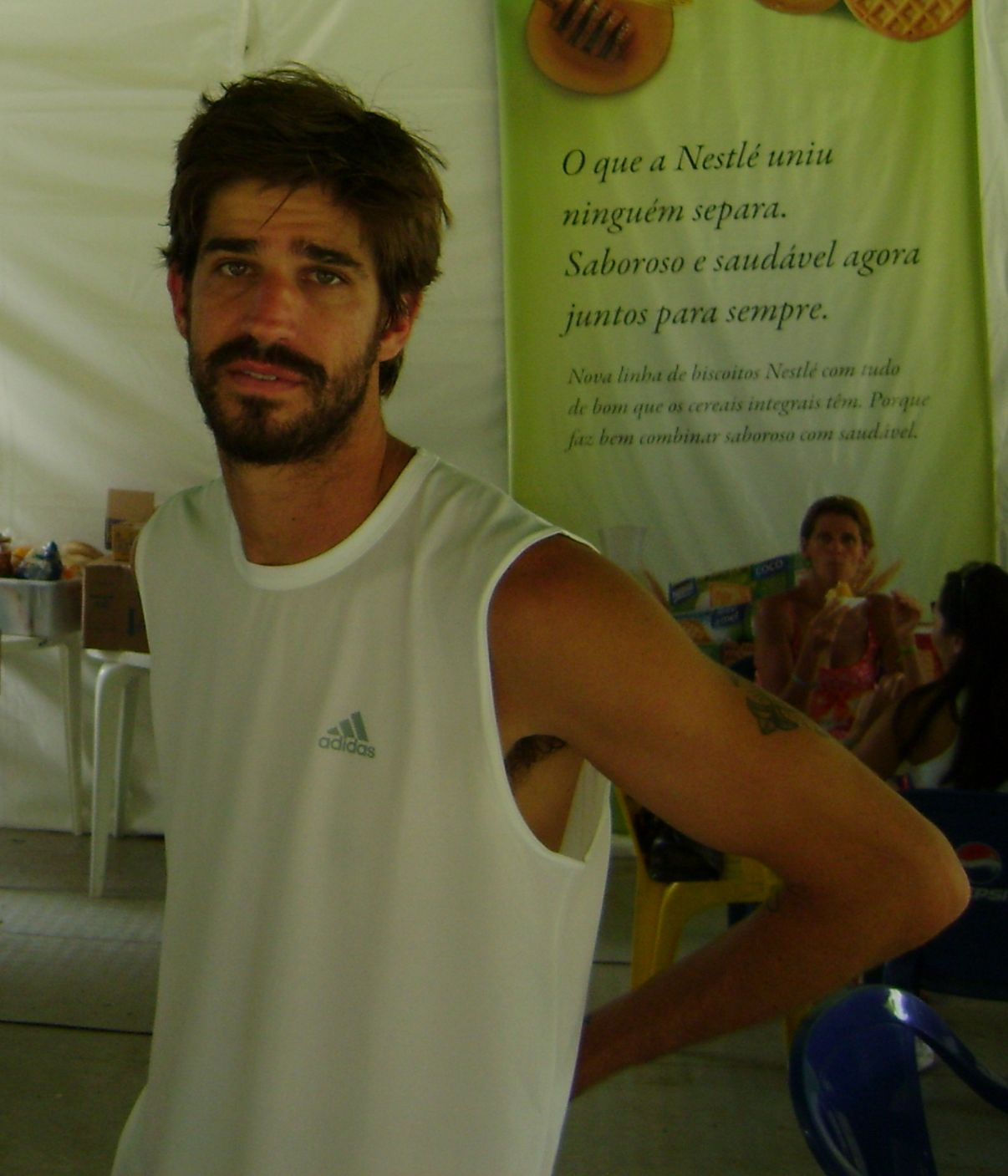
Paulista Flávio Saretta won the event thrice in singles, in 2001, 2003 and 2006, and once in doubles, in 2006

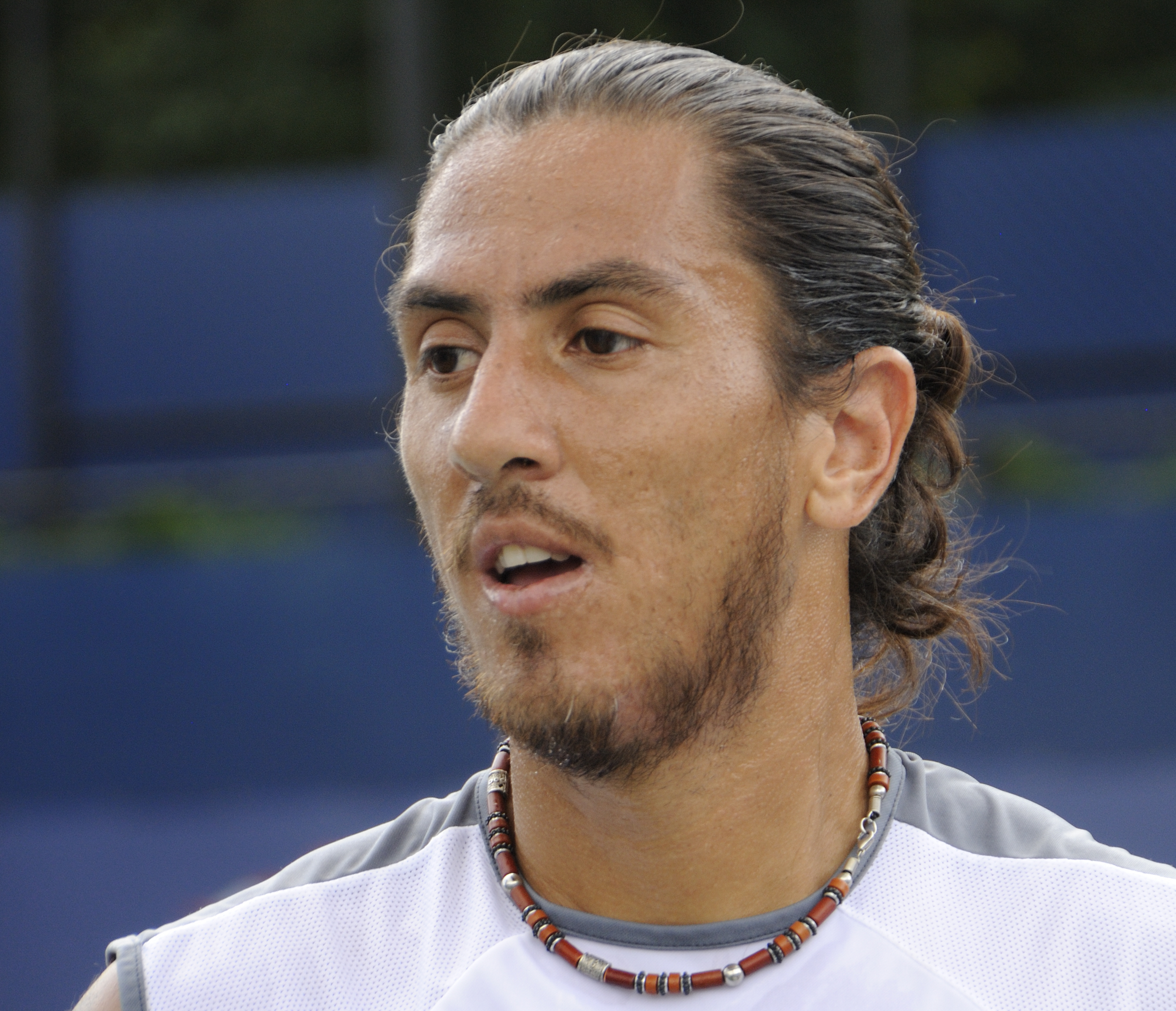
Argentine Guillermo Cañas is also amongst the event's champions, having taken the singles title in 2007

The Aberto de São Paulo was a tennis tournament played on outdoor hardcourts. It was part of the ATP Challenger Tour. It was held annually at the Parque Villa Lobos in São Paulo, Brazil, from 2001 until 2014. All the Brazilian single title winning players have multiple victories, with the exception of João Souza who won the last edition. The record is detained in the single discipline by Ricardo Mello, and by André Sá in doubles, both with four wins. In 2006 Brazilian player Flávio Saretta won both singles and doubles titles.

== Past finals ==
=== Singles ===
Year	Champion	Runner-up	Score
2014	(Brazil) João Souza	(Colombia) Alejandro González	6–4, 6–4
2013	(Argentina) Horacio Zeballos	(Brazil) Rogério Dutra da Silva	7–6^{(7–5)}, 6–2
2012	(Brazil) Thiago Alves (2)	(Portugal) Gastão Elias	7–6^{(7–5)}, 7–6^{(7–1)}
2011	(Brazil) Ricardo Mello (4)	(Brazil) Rafael Camilo	6–2, 6–1
2010	(Brazil) Ricardo Mello (3)	(Argentina) Eduardo Schwank	6–3, 6–1
2009	(Brazil) Ricardo Mello (2)	(Chile) Paul Capdeville	6–2, 6–4
2008	(Brazil) Thiago Alves (1)	(Argentina) Carlos Berlocq	6–4, 3–6, 7–5
2007	(Argentina) Guillermo Cañas	(Argentina) Diego Hartfield	6–3, 6–4
2006	(Brazil) Flávio Saretta (3)	(Brazil) Thiago Alves	7–6, 6–3
2005	(Brazil) Ricardo Mello (1)	(Ecuador) Giovanni Lapentti	4–6, 6–2, 7–6
2004	(Argentina) Juan Mónaco	(Chile) Adrián García	6–4, 7–6
2003	(Brazil) Flávio Saretta (2)	(Argentina) Andrés Dellatorre	7–6, 6–3
2002	(Canada) Frédéric Niemeyer	(Argentina) Martín Vassallo Argüello	7–6, 0–1 retired
2001	(Brazil) Flávio Saretta (1)	(Argentina) Guillermo Coria	7–6, 6–2

=== Doubles ===
Year	Champions	Runners-up	Score
2014	(Germany) Gero Kretschmer (Germany) Alexander Satschko	(Colombia) Nicolás Barrientos (Dominican Republic) Víctor Estrella	4–6, 7–5, [10–6]
2013	(United States) James Cerretani (Canada) Adil Shamasdin	(Argentina) Federico Delbonis (Argentina) Renzo Olivo	6–7^{(5–7)}, 6–1, [11–9]
2012	(Brazil) Fernando Romboli (Brazil) Júlio Silva	(Slovakia) Jozef Kovalík (Brazil) José Pereira	7–5, 6–2
2011	(Brazil) Franco Ferreiro (Brazil) André Sá (4)	(Mexico) Santiago González (Argentina) Horacio Zeballos	7–5, 7–6(12)
2010	(Argentina) Brian Dabul (Argentina) Sebastián Prieto	(Poland) Tomasz Bednarek (Poland) Mateusz Kowalczyk	6–3, 6–3
2009	(Argentina) Carlos Berlocq (Argentina) Leonardo Mayer	(Argentina) Mariano Hood (Argentina) Horacio Zeballos	7–6, 6–3
2008	(United Kingdom) Jamie Delgado (1) (Brazil) Bruno Soares (2)	(Argentina) Brian Dabul (Argentina) Horacio Zeballos	6–1, 6–3
2007	(Uruguay) Pablo Cuevas (Chile) Adrián García	(Brazil) Marcelo Melo (Brazil) Alexandre Simoni	6–4, 6–2
2006	(Brazil) Thiago Alves (Brazil) Flávio Saretta	(Brazil) Lucas Engel (Brazil) André Ghem	7–6 6–3
2005	(Brazil) André Sá (3) (Brazil) Bruno Soares (1)	(Germany) Tomas Behrend (Brazil) Marcos Daniel	6–2, 6–2
2004	(Paraguay) Ramón Delgado (1) (Brazil) André Sá (2)	(Brazil) Franco Ferreiro (Brazil) Marcelo Melo	7–5, 7–6
2003	(Argentina) Federico Browne (Netherlands) Rogier Wassen	(Argentina) Ignacio Hirigoyen (Israel) Andy Ram	7–6, 7–6
2002	(United States) Brandon Coupe (Canada) Frédéric Niemeyer	(Argentina) Federico Browne (Peru) Luis Horna	6–7, 7–6, 6–4
2001	(Israel) Noam Okun (Brazil) André Sá (1)	(France) Cédric Kauffmann (Brazil) Flávio Saretta	6–4, 1–6, 6–4
