= Ricardo Mello =

Brazilian tennis player

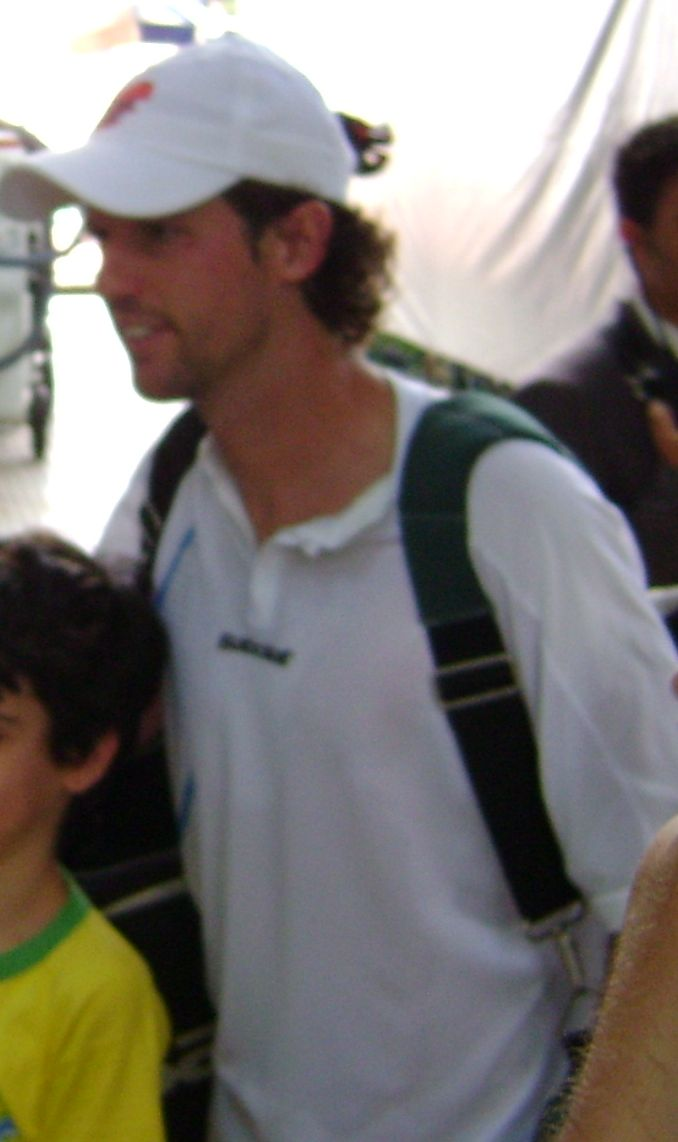
- Country (sports): Brazil
- Residence: Campinas, Brazil
- Born: 21 December 1980 (age 44) Campinas, Brazil
- Height: 1.75 m (5 ft 9 in)
- Turned pro: 1999
- Retired: 2013
- Plays: Left-handed (two-handed backhand)
- Prize money: $1,484,044

Singles
- Career record: 60–94 (at ATP Tour-level, Grand Slam-level, and in Davis Cup)
- Career titles: 1
- Highest ranking: No. 50 (25 July 2005)

Grand Slam singles results
- Australian Open: 2R (2005, 2012)
- French Open: 1R (2004, 2005, 2010, 2011)
- Wimbledon: 2R (2011)
- US Open: 3R (2004)

Doubles
- Career record: 11–25 (at ATP Tour-level, Grand Slam-level, and in Davis Cup)
- Career titles: 0
- Highest ranking: No. 118 (11 July 2005)

Grand Slam doubles results
- Australian Open: 3R (2012)
- French Open: 2R (2005)
- Wimbledon: 1R (2005, 2011)

Ricardo Mello (born 21 December 1980) is a Brazilian retired tennis player. His preference is for clay courts. He has had the occasional win in hard court tournaments. His best singles rank was No. 50 in 2005. He won one singles tournament (Delray Beach in 2004) and reached the semifinals three times at the Brasil Open. He played most of his tennis in Challenger tournaments, where he won 15 singles titles and three doubles titles.

== Career ==
=== Early days ===
Ricardo was born in Campinas, Brazil and started to play tennis at the age of three. At 15, he drew a wild card into a tournament in his hometown. He lost to veteran and French Open winner Gustavo Kuerten. However, he gained his first ATP career points. In 1999, Ricardo won his first Futures events in Uruguay and Paraguay.

=== 2004 ===
Mello won his lone ATP title at Delray Beach, defeating Vincent Spadea in the final. One of his first major feats was qualifying for the main singles draw in the Australian Open that year, his first participation in a Grand Slam tournament; he lost to #8 seed David Nalbandian in the first round.

=== 2006 ===
At the Campbell's Hall of Fame Championships, Mello played top seed Andy Murray. Murray was in control of the first set, winning 6–1, but Mello won the second set 6–1. Mello took the third and final to a tiebreak, after having three match points. He lost in the tiebreak 5–7.

At the RCA Championships in Indianapolis, Mello faced Jean-René Lisnard in the first round and won in straight sets. In the second round, he faced 14th seed Vincent Spadea and lost.

== Sponsorship ==
The sponsor for his clothes, shoes and racquets was Babolat.

== ATP Tour Career Finals ==
=== Singles: 1 (1 title) ===
Legend Grand Slam tournaments (0–0) ATP World Tour Finals (0–0) ATP World Tour Masters 1000 (0–0) ATP World Tour 500 Series (0–0) ATP World Tour 250 Series (1–0)	Finals by surface Hard (1–0) Clay (0–0) Grass (0–0)	Finals by setting Outdoor (1–0) Indoor (0–0)

Result	W–L	Date	Tournament	Tier	Surface	Opponent	Score
Win	1–0	Sep 2004	Delray Beach, United States	250 Series	Hard	(United States) Vincent Spadea	7–6^{(7–2)}, 6–3

== ATP Challenger and ITF Futures finals ==
=== Singles: 30 (21–9) ===
Legend ATP Challenger (15–8) ITF Futures (6–1)	Finals by surface Hard (14–7) Clay (7–2) Grass (0–0) Carpet (0–0)

Result	W–L	Date	Tournament	Tier	Surface	Opponent	Score
Win	1–0	Aug 1999	Uruguay F2, Jose-Ignacio	Futures	Clay	(Brazil) Marcos Daniel	6–7, 7–5, 6–3
Win	2–0	Oct 1999	Paraguay F3, Asunción	Futures	Clay	(Hungary) Gergely Kisgyörgy	7–5, 6–1
Win	3–0	Jun 2000	Mexico F3, Merida	Futures	Hard	(Argentina) Ignacio Hirigoyen	6–4, 1–6, 6–4
Win	4–0	Sep 2000	Brazil F1, Vitoria	Futures	Clay	(Brazil) Júlio Silva	6–4, 6–3
Loss	4–1	Feb 2001	USA F4, Corpus Christi	Futures	Hard	(South Africa) Damien Roberts	4–6, 2–6
Win	5–1	Apr 2001	Brazil F2, Teresopolis	Futures	Clay	(Argentina) Rodrigo Cerdera	6–2, 6–4
Win	6–1	May 2001	USA F11, Vero Beach	Futures	Clay	(France) Thomas Dupre	4–6, 6–2, 6–4
Win	7–1	Jul 2001	Campos do Jordão, Brazil	Challenger	Hard	(Brazil) Alexandre Simoni	7–6^{(8–6)}, 4–6, 7–6^{(7–5)}
Loss	7–2	Dec 2001	Rio de Janeiro, Brazil	Challenger	Hard	(Denmark) Kristian Pless	1–6, 1–6
Loss	7–3	Mar 2002	Salinas, Ecuador	Challenger	Hard	(Peru) Iván Miranda	3–6, 4–6
Win	8–3	Jul 2002	Campos do Jordão, Brazil	Challenger	Hard	(Germany) Maximilian Abel	7–6^{(7–2)}, 6–3
Win	9–3	Aug 2002	Belo Horizonte, Brazil	Challenger	Hard	(Brazil) Alexandre Simoni	6–3, 6–3
Loss	9–4	Oct 2003	Quito, Ecuador	Challenger	Clay	(Ecuador) Giovanni Lapentti	3–6, 7–6^{(10–8)}, 3–6
Win	10–4	Nov 2003	Puebla, Mexico	Challenger	Hard	(Germany) Markus Hantschk	7–6^{(7–5)}, 6–4
Loss	10–5	Aug 2004	Belo Horizonte, Brazil	Challenger	Hard	(Serbia and Montenegro) Janko Tipsarević	4–6, 7–5, 4–6
Win	11–5	Aug 2004	Gramado, Brazil	Challenger	Hard	(Serbia and Montenegro) Janko Tipsarević	2–6, 7–5, 6–4
Win	12–5	Jan 2005	São Paulo, Brazil	Challenger	Hard	(Ecuador) Giovanni Lapentti	4–6, 6–2, 7–6^{(7–0)}
Win	13–5	Apr 2006	Florianópolis, Brazil	Challenger	Clay	(Argentina) Diego Junqueira	6–3, 5–7, 7–6^{(7–4)}
Win	14–5	Jul 2006	Campos do Jordão, Brazil	Challenger	Hard	(Germany) Ivo Klec	6–3, 6–4
Loss	14–6	Mar 2008	Leon, Mexico	Challenger	Hard	(Mexico) Bruno Echagaray	0–6, 6–3, 6–7^{(6–8)}
Loss	14–7	Jul 2008	Manta, Ecuador	Challenger	Hard	(Ecuador) Giovanni Lapentti	2–6, 4–6
Win	15–7	Jan 2009	São Paulo, Brazil	Challenger	Hard	(Chile) Paul Capdeville	6–2, 6–4
Win	16–7	Aug 2009	Brasília, Brazil	Challenger	Hard	(Argentina) Juan Ignacio Chela	7–6^{(7–2)}, 6–4
Win	17–7	Jan 2010	São Paulo, Brazil	Challenger	Hard	(Argentina) Eduardo Schwank	6–3, 6–1
Loss	17–8	Apr 2010	Curitiba, Brazil	Challenger	Clay	(Germany) Dominik Meffert	4–6, 7–6^{(7–3)}, 2–6
Loss	17–9	Aug 2010	Campos do Jordão, Brazil	Challenger	Hard	(South Africa) Izak van der Merwe	6–7^{(6–8)}, 3–6
Win	18–9	Aug 2010	Salvador, Brazil	Challenger	Hard	(Brazil) Thiago Alves	5–7, 6–4, 6–4
Win	19–9	Jan 2011	São Paulo, Brazil	Challenger	Hard	(Brazil) Rafael Camilo	6–2, 6–1
Win	20–9	Oct 2011	Recife, Brazil	Challenger	Hard	(Brazil) Rogério Dutra Silva	7–6^{(7–5)}, 6–3
Win	21–9	Oct 2011	São José do Rio Preto, Brazil	Challenger	Clay	(Argentina) Eduardo Schwank	6–4, 6–2

=== Doubles: 16 (3–13) ===
Legend ATP Challenger (3–12) ITF Futures (0–1)	Finals by surface Hard (1–6) Clay (2–7) Grass (0–0) Carpet (0–0)

Result	W–L	Date	Tournament	Tier	Surface	Partner	Opponents	Score
Loss	0–1	Jun 2001	Brazil F3, São Paulo	Futures	Clay	(Brazil) Marcos Daniel	(Argentina) Diego Veronelli (Brazil) Adriano Ferreira	3–6, 4–6
Loss	0–2	Jul 2001	Campos do Jordão, Brazil	Challenger	Hard	(Brazil) Ricardo Schlachter	(Mexico) Alejandro Hernández (Brazil) André Sá	7–6^{(8–6)}, 6–7^{(5–7)}, 5–7
Loss	0–3	Sep 2001	São Paulo, Brazil	Challenger	Clay	(Brazil) Marcos Daniel	(Brazil) Adriano Ferreira (Argentina) Edgardo Massa	walkover
Loss	0–4	Jun 2002	Andorra Challenger, Andorra	Challenger	Hard	(Chile) Hermes Gamonal	(South Africa) Shaun Rudman (South Africa) Wesley Moodie	2–6, 1–6
Loss	0–5	Jun 2003	Andorra Challenger, Andorra	Challenger	Hard	(Brazil) Alexandre Simoni	(South Africa) Rik de Voest (Finland) Tuomas Ketola	4–6, 6–3, 4–6
Win	1–5	Oct 2003	Quito, Ecuador	Challenger	Clay	(Brazil) Alexandre Simoni	(Brazil) Ricardo Schlachter (United States) Hugo Armando	6–3, 6–4
Loss	1–6	Jul 2004	São Paulo, Brazil	Challenger	Hard	(Brazil) Henrique Mello	(Mexico) Alejandro Hernández (Brazil) André Sá	4–6, 4–6
Win	2–6	Jul 2004	Campos do Jordão, Brazil	Challenger	Hard	(Peru) Iván Miranda	(Mexico) Alejandro Hernández (Brazil) André Sá	6–3, 6–4
Loss	2–7	Jul 2005	Biella, Italy	Challenger	Clay	(Brazil) Carlos Berlocq	(Belgium) Tom Vanhoudt (Romania) Gabriel Trifu	4–6, 6–4, 4–6
Loss	2–8	May 2006	Tunica Resorts, United States	Challenger	Clay	(United States) Hugo Armando	(United States) Jeff Morrison (United States) Bobby Reynolds	6–3, 6–7^{)5-7)}, [9–11]
Loss	2–9	Oct 2007	Quito, Ecuador	Challenger	Clay	(United States) Hugo Armando	(Argentina) Brian Dabul (Brazil) Marcos Daniel	6–4, 5–7, [7–10]
Loss	2–10	Sep 2008	Quito, Ecuador	Challenger	Clay	(Brazil) Caio Zampieri	(Argentina) Leonardo Mayer (United States) Hugo Armando	5–7, 2–6
Loss	2–11	Jul 2009	Bogotá, Colombia	Challenger	Clay	(Brazil) Marcos Daniel	(Argentina) Sebastián Prieto (Argentina) Horacio Zeballos	4–6, 5–7
Loss	2–12	Aug 2009	Brasília, Brazil	Challenger	Hard	(Brazil) Caio Zampieri	(Brazil) Rodrigo Guidolin (Brazil) Marcelo Demoliner	4–6, 2–6
Win	3–12	Nov 2001	São Paulo, Brazil	Challenger	Clay	(Brazil) Franco Ferreiro	(Argentina) Diego Junqueira (Spain) David Marrero	6–3, 6–3
Loss	3–13	Aug 2010	Brasília, Brazil	Challenger	Hard	(Brazil) Caio Zampieri	(Brazil) Franco Ferreiro (Brazil) André Sá	6–7^{(5–7)}, 3–6

== Grand Slam performance timeline ==
Key
W	F	SF	QF	#R	RR	Q#	DNQ	A	NH

(W) winner; (F) finalist; (SF) semifinalist; (QF) quarterfinalist; (#R) rounds 4, 3, 2, 1; (RR) round-robin stage; (Q#) qualification round; (DNQ) did not qualify; (A) absent; (NH) not held; (SR) strike rate (events won / competed); (W–L) win–loss record.

Tournament	2001	2002	2003	2004	2005	2006	2007	2008	2009	2010	2011	2012	SR	W–L	Win %
Australian Open	A	A	Q2	1R	2R	1R	A	A	A	A	1R	2R	0 / 5	2–5	29%
French Open	A	Q2	Q1	1R	1R	Q1	Q1	A	Q1	1R	1R	A	0 / 4	0–4	0%
Wimbledon	A	Q2	Q2	Q1	1R	A	Q2	Q2	Q1	1R	2R	A	0 / 3	1–3	25%
US Open	Q3	Q2	Q3	3R	2R	Q2	Q1	Q1	Q3	2R	1R	1R	0 / 5	4–5	44%
Win–loss	0–0	0–0	0–0	2–3	2–4	0–1	0–0	0–0	0–0	1–3	1–4	1–2	0 / 17	7–17	29%
Year-end ranking	133	144	128	71	111	134	257	198	151	76	85	286			
ATP Tour Masters 1000
Indian Wells Masters	A	A	A	Q1	1R	A	A	A	Q2	2R	2R	Q1	0 / 3	2–3	40%
Miami Open	A	Q1	Q1	2R	2R	Q2	2R	A	1R	1R	1R	Q1	0 / 6	3–6	33%
Madrid	A	A	A	Q1	Q1	A	A	A	A	A	A	A	0 / 0	0–0	–
Toronto/Montreal	A	A	A	A	2R	A	A	A	A	A	A	A	0 / 1	1–1	50%
Cincinnati	A	A	A	A	1R	A	A	A	A	A	A	A	0 / 1	0–1	0%
Win–loss	0–0	0–0	0–0	1–1	2–4	0–0	1–1	0–0	0–1	1–2	1–2	0–0	0 / 11	6–11	35%
